= 2009–10 Atlético Madrid season =

104th season in existence of Atlético Madrid

Atlético Madrid
2009–10 season
- President: Enrique Cerezo
- Head coach: Abel Resino (until 23 October 2009); Santi Denia (caretaker); Quique Sánchez Flores (from 23 October 2009)
- Stadium: Vicente Calderón
- La Liga: 9th
- Copa del Rey: Runners-up
- UEFA Champions League: Group stage
- UEFA Europa League: Winners
- Top goalscorer: League: Diego Forlán (18); All: Diego Forlán (28)
Home colours	Away colours

The 2009–10 season was the 104th season in Atlético Madrid's history and their 73rd season in La Liga, the top division of Spanish football. It covers a period from 1 July 2009 to 30 June 2010.

Atlético salvaged a largely disappointing season, thanks to a late resurgence resulting in the UEFA Europa League title, following a 2–1 final victory against Fulham. During the course of the tournament, Atlético overcame Liverpool among others, much thanks to Diego Forlán's goalscoring talent. Forlán scored the winning away goal against Liverpool in the extra-time during the semis, as well as two goals against Fulham, culminating in another extra time-winner.

Elsewhere, Atlético reached the final of Copa del Rey, where it lost to Sevilla. The league and Champions League runs were disappointing, however, not winning a single game in Champions League, and just finishing in the top half of the league.

== Transfers ==
In (summer):

(Spain) Sergio Asenjo: €5m from Real Valladolid

(Uruguay) Leandro Cabrera: €1.5m from Defensor Sporting

(Spain) Juanito: Free from Real Betis

In (winter):

(Argentina) Eduardo Salvio: €10m from Lanús

(Portugal) Tiago: Loan from Juventus

Out (summer):

(Netherlands) John Heitinga: €7.04m to Everton

(France) Grégory Coupet: To PSG

(Spain) Luis García to Racing Santander

(Spain) Miguel de las Cuevas To Sporting Gijón

(Portugal) Maniche Free to Köln

(Argentina) Leo Franco: Free to Galatasaray

(Greece) Giourkas Seitaridis: Free to Panathinaikos

Out (winter):

(France) Florent Sinama Pongolle: €6.5m to Sporting CP

(Argentina) Maxi Rodríguez: Free to Liverpool

(Spain) Roberto: Loan to Olympiacos

== Squad ==
=== Goalkeepers ===
- (Spain) David de Gea (43/13)
- (Spain) Sergio Asenjo (1)
- (Spain) Roberto (13 until January 2010)

=== Defenders ===
- (Spain) Juan Valera Espín (2)
- (Spain) Antonio López (C) (3)
- (Netherlands) John Heitinga (5 until September 2009)
- (Spain) (Argentina) Mariano Pernía (4)
- (Spain) Juanito (16)
- (Czech Republic) Tomáš Ujfaluši (17)
- (Spain) Álvaro Domínguez (18)
- (Colombia) (Spain) Luis Perea (21)
- (Spain) Pablo Ibáñez (22)
- (Uruguay) Leandro Cabrera (24)

=== Midfielders ===
- (Portugal) Tiago (5 since January 2010)
- (Spain) Ignacio Camacho (6)
- (Spain) Raúl García (8)
- (Spain) Jurado (9)
- (Argentina) (Italy) Maxi Rodríguez (11)
- (Brazil) (Portugal) Paulo Assunção (12)
- (Argentina) Eduardo Salvio (14 since January 2010)
- (Spain) José Antonio Reyes (19)
- (Portugal) Simão (20)
- (Brazil) Cléber (23)
- (Spain) Koke (29)
- (Democratic Republic of the Congo) Cedric (57)
- (Spain) Rubén Pérez (35)

=== Attackers ===
- (Uruguay) (Spain) Diego Forlán (7)
- (Argentina) (Spain) Sergio Agüero (10)
- (France) Florent Sinama Pongolle (14 until January 2010)
- (Spain) Borja González (27, later 55)
- (Senegal) Ibrahima Baldé (58)
- (Spain) Jorge Molino (59)
- (Uruguay) (Spain) Sebastián Gallegos

== Overall Record ==
Competition	Final position	Record							
Competition	Final position	Pld	W	D	L	GF	GA	GD	Win %
La Liga	9th	38	13	8	17	57	61	−4	34.21
Copa del Rey	Runners-up	9	5	1	3	21	10	+11	55.56
UEFA Champions League	Group Stage	8	2	3	3	8	14	−6	25.00
UEFA Europa League	Winner	9	3	5	1	11	9	+2	33.33
Total		64	23	17	24	97	94	+3	35.94

Source: Competitions

== Competitions ==
=== La Liga ===
==== League table ====
Pos	Team	Pld	W	D	L	GF	GA	GD	Pts	Qualification or relegation
7	Villarreal	38	16	8	14	58	57	+1	56 (Note: Mallorca could not qualify for the 2010–11 UEFA Europa League due to being immersed in a creditor contest, a situation against UEFA criteria. Then, Villarreal was invited to replace this spot.)	Qualification for the Europa League play-off round
8	Athletic Bilbao	38	15	9	14	50	53	−3	54	
9	Atlético Madrid	38	13	8	17	57	61	−4	47 (Note: DEP 2–1 ATM; ATM 3–0 DEP)	Qualification for the Europa League group stage (Note: Since Atlético Madrid won the 2009–10 UEFA Europa League they earned a spot in the group stage of the 2010–11 UEFA Europa League.)
10	Deportivo La Coruña	38	13	8	17	35	49	−14	47	
11	Espanyol	38	11	11	16	29	46	−17	44	

Source: LFP and Yahoo! Sport
Rules for classification: 1) points; 2) head-to-head points; 3) head-to-head goal difference; 4) head-to-head goals scored; 5) goal difference; 6) number of goals scored.

==== Matches ====
- Málaga–Atlético Madrid 3-0
- 1-0 Nabil Baha 34'
- 2-0 Manu 62'
- 3-0 Manu Torres 89'
- Atlético Madrid–Racing Santander 1-1
- 1-0 Jurado 43'
- 1-1 Óscar Serrano 45'
- Barcelona–Atlético Madrid 5-2
- 1-0 Zlatan Ibrahimović 2'
- 2-0 Lionel Messi 16'
- 3-0 Dani Alves 30'
- 4-0 Seydou Keita 41'
- 4-1 Sergio Agüero 45'
- 4-2 Diego Forlán 84'
- 5-2 Lionel Messi 90'
- Atlético Madrid–Almería 2-2
- 0-1 Pablo Piatti 26'
- 1-1 Cléber 28'
- 2-1 Diego Forlán 56'
- 2-2 Pablo Piatti 90'
- Valencia–Atlético Madrid 2-2
- 0-1 Sergio Agüero 7'
- 1-1 Pablo Hernández 25'
- 2-1 David Villa 27'
- 2-2 Maxi Rodríguez 90'
- Atlético Madrid–Real Zaragoza 2-1
- 1-0 Jurado 2'
- 2-0 Antonio López 66'
- 2-1 Ewerthon 71' (pen.)
- Osasuna–Atlético Madrid 3-0
- 1-0 Walter Pandiani 4'
- 2-0 Walter Pandiani 27'
- 3-0 Carlos Aranda 30'
- Atlético Madrid–Mallorca 1-1
- 1-0 Diego Forlán 52' (pen.)
- 1-1 Borja Valero 90'
- Athletic Bilbao–Atlético Madrid 1-0
- 1-0 Javi Martínez 19'
- Atlético Madrid–Real Madrid 2-3
- 0-1 Kaká 5'
- 0-2 Marcelo 24'
- 0-3 Gonzalo Higuaín 64'
- 1-3 Diego Forlán 79'
- 2-3 Sergio Agüero 81'
- Deportivo–Atlético Madrid 2-1
- 0-1 Sergio Agüero 3'
- 1-1 Diego Colotto 21'
- 2-1 Andrés Guardado 90' (pen.)
- Atlético Madrid–Espanyol 4-0
- 1-0 Diego Forlán 27'
- 2-0 Sergio Agüero 62'
- 3-0 Sergio Agüero 85'
- 4-0 Maxi Rodríguez 89'
- Xerez–Atlético Madrid 0-2
- 0-1 Diego Forlán 29'
- 0-2 Sergio Agüero 65'
- Atlético Madrid–Villarreal 1-2
- 1-0 Simão 37'
- 1-1 David Fuster 49'
- 1-2 Joseba Llorente 90'
- Tenerife–Atlético Madrid 1-1
- 1-0 Nino 3'
- 1-1 Jurado 22'
- Atlético Madrid–Sevilla 2-1
- 0-1 Renato 44'
- 1-1 Ivica Dragutinović 48' (o.g.)
- 2-1 Antonio López 90'
- Valladolid–Atlético Madrid 0-4
- 0-1 Jurado 16'
- 0-2 Diego Forlán 32'
- 0-3 José Antonio Reyes 59'
- 0-4 Sergio Agüero 90'
- Atlético Madrid–Sporting Gijón 3-2
- 1-0 Diego Forlán 13'
- 1-1 Diego Castro 34' (pen.)
- 2-1 Paulo Assunção 53'
- 3-1 Ibrahima Baldé 66'
- 3-2 Luis Morán 90'
- Getafe–Atlético Madrid 1-0
- 1-0 Manu del Moral 39'
- Atlético Madrid–Málaga 0-2
- 0-1 Duda 3'
- 0-2 Javi López 70'
- Racing Santander–Atlético Madrid 1-1
- 0-1 Diego Forlán 24'
- 1-1 Gonzalo Colsa 36'
- Atlético Madrid–Barcelona 2-1
- 1-0 Diego Forlán 9'
- 2-0 Simão 23'
- 2-1 Zlatan Ibrahimović 27'
- Almería–Atlético Madrid 1-0
- 1-0 Pablo Piatti 87'
- Atlético Madrid–Valencia 4-1
- 0-1 David Silva 20'
- 1-1 Diego Forlán 30' (pen.)
- 2-1 Sergio Agüero 78'
- 3-1 Diego Forlán 86'
- 4-1 Jurado 90'
- Real Zaragoza–Atlético Madrid 1-1
- 1-0 Jiří Jarošík 7'
- 1-1 Ibrahima Baldé 90'
- Atlético Madrid–Osasuna 1-0
- 1-0 Jurado 79'
- Mallorca–Atlético Madrid 4-1
- 1-0 Víctor 10'
- 1-1 Diego Forlán 26'
- 2-1 Aritz Aduriz 28'
- 3-1 Luis Perea 86' (o.g.)
- 4-1 Felipe Mattioni 90'
- Atlético Madrid–Athletic Bilbao 2-0
- 1-0 Diego Forlán 54'
- 2-0 Sergio Agüero 86'
- Real Madrid–Atlético Madrid 3-2
- 0-1 José Antonio Reyes 10'
- 1-1 Xabi Alonso 49'
- 2-1 Álvaro Arbeloa 55'
- 3-1 Gonzalo Higuaín 62'
- 3-2 Diego Forlán 68'
- Atlético Madrid–Deportivo La Coruña 3-0
- 1-0 Juanito 22'
- 2-0 Diego Forlán 57'
- 3-0 Tiago 61'
- Espanyol–Atlético Madrid 3-0
- 1-0 Víctor Ruiz 47'
- 2-0 Pablo Osvaldo 67'
- 3-0 Iván Alonso 90'
- Atlético Madrid–Xerez 1-2
- 0-1 Mario Bermejo 9'
- 1-1 Diego Forlán 12'
- 1-2 Emiliano Armenteros 72'
- Villarreal–Atlético Madrid 2-1
- 1-0 Diego Godín 21'
- 2-0 Giuseppe Rossi 44'
- 2-1 Sergio Agüero 64'
- Atlético Madrid–Tenerife 3-1
- 1-0 Eduardo Salvio 10'
- 2-0 Eduardo Salvio 31'
- 2-1 Román Martínez 61'
- 3-1 Sergio Agüero 78'
- Sevilla–Atlético Madrid 3-1
- 1-0 Luís Fabiano 5'
- 1-1 Tiago 8'
- 2-1 Álvaro Negredo 13' (pen.)
- 3-1 Álvaro Negredo 40' (pen.)
- Atlético Madrid–Valladolid 3-1
- 1-0 Juanito 43'
- 2-0 Jurado 67'
- 3-0 Diego Forlán 73'
- 3-1 Jonathan Sesma 78'
- Sporting Gijón–Atlético Madrid 1-1
- 1-0 Miguel de las Cuevas 57'
- 1-1 Ibrahima Baldé 71'
- Atlético Madrid–Getafe 0-3
- 0-1 Roberto Soldado 14'
- 0-2 Roberto Soldado 53'
- 0-3 Dani Parejo 87'

=== Copa del Rey ===
==== Round of 32 ====
27 October 2009 First Leg	Marbella	0–2	Atlético Madrid	Marbella
			Troyano 18' (o.g.); Rodríguez 81'	Stadium: Estadio Municipal de Marbella; Attendance: 7,000; Referee: Miguel Ángel Ayza Gámez

10 November 2009 Second Leg	Atlético Madrid	6–0 (8–0 agg.)	Marbella	Madrid
	Jurado 11'; Sinama Pongolle 16'; Rodríguez 21', 30', 46', 62'			Stadium: Vicente Calderón Stadium; Attendance: 15,000; Referee: Xavier Estrada Fernández

==== Round of 16 ====
6 January 2010 First Leg	Recreativo	3–0	Atlético Madrid	Huelva
22:00 CET	Fornaroli 14'; Barrales 25' (pen.); Candeias 88'	Report		Stadium: Nuevo Colombino; Attendance: 2,500; Referee: José González González

14 January 2010 Second Leg	Atlético Madrid	5–1 (5–4 agg.)	Recreativo	Madrid
22:00 CET	Simão 22', 83'; Agüero 24', 63'; Ujfaluši 40'	Report	Carmona 71'	Stadium: Vicente Calderón Stadium; Attendance: 28,000; Referee: Carlos Delgado Ferreiro

==== Quarter-finals ====
21 January 2010 First Leg	Atlético Madrid	1–1	Celta Vigo	Madrid
22:00 CET	Tiago 11'	Report	Trashorras 3'	Stadium: Vicente Calderón; Attendance: 48,000; Referee: Alberto Undiano Mallenco

28 January 2010 Second Leg	Celta Vigo	0–1 (1–2 agg.)	Atlético Madrid	Vigo
22:00 CET		Report	Forlán 26'	Stadium: Balaídos; Attendance: 30,000; Referee: Miguel Ángel Pérez Lasa

==== Semi-finals ====
4 February 2010 First Leg	Atlético Madrid	4–0	Racing Santander	Madrid
22:00 CET	Simão 9'; Reyes 40'; Forlán 62' (pen.), 71' (pen.)	Report		Stadium: Vicente Calderón; Attendance: 30,000; Referee: Antonio Mateu Lahoz

11 February 2010 Second Leg	Racing Santander	3–2 (3–6 agg.)	Atlético Madrid	Santander
22:00 CET	Valera 2' (o.g.); Xisco 88'; Tchité 90'	Report	Moratón 8' (o.g.); Jurado 51'	Stadium: El Sardinero; Attendance: 18,000; Referee: Alberto Undiano Mallenco

==== Final ====
19 May 2010	Sevilla	2–0	Atlético Madrid	Camp Nou, Barcelona
21:30 CEST	Capel 5'; Navas 90+1'	Report		Attendance: 93,000; Referee: Mejuto González

=== UEFA Champions League ===
==== Play-Off Round ====
19 August 2009 First leg	Panathinaikos (Greece)	2–3	(Spain) Atlético Madrid	Athens, Greece
20:45	Salpingidis 47'; Leto 74'	Report	Rodríguez 36'; Forlán 63'; Agüero 70'	Stadium: Olympic Stadium; Attendance: 50,540; Referee: Felix Brych (Germany)

25 August 2009 Second leg	Atlético Madrid (Spain)	2–0 (5–2 agg.)	(Greece) Panathinaikos	Madrid, Spain
20:45	Vyntra 4' (o.g.); Agüero 83'	Report		Stadium: Vicente Calderón; Attendance: 29,910; Referee: Pieter Vink (Netherlands)

==== Group stage ====
Pos	Team	Pld	W	D	L	GF	GA	GD	Pts	Qualification
1	(England) Chelsea	6	4	2	0	11	4	+7	14	Advance to knockout phase
2	(Portugal) Porto	6	4	0	2	8	3	+5	12	Advance to knockout phase
3	(Spain) Atlético Madrid	6	0	3	3	3	12	−9	3	Transfer to Europa League
4	(Cyprus) APOEL	6	0	3	3	4	7	−3	3	

Source: RSSSF

15 September 2009 1	Atlético Madrid (Spain)	0–0	(Cyprus) APOEL	Madrid, Spain
20:45 CEST (UTC+02:00)		Report		Stadium: Vicente Calderón; Attendance: 30,628; Referee: Craig Thomson (Scotland)

30 September 2009 2	Porto (Portugal)	2–0	(Spain) Atlético Madrid	Porto, Portugal
20:45 (19:45 UTC+1)	Falcao 75'; Rolando 82'	Report		Stadium: Estádio do Dragão; Attendance: 37,609; Referee: Nicola Rizzoli (Italy)

21 October 2009 3	Chelsea (England)	4–0	(Spain) Atlético Madrid	London, England
20:45 (19:45 UTC+1)	Kalou 41', 52'; Lampard 69'; Perea 90+1' (o.g.)	Report		Stadium: Stamford Bridge; Attendance: 39,997; Referee: Florian Meyer (Germany)

3 November 2009 4	Atlético Madrid (Spain)	2–2	(England) Chelsea	Madrid, Spain
20:45 CET (UTC+01:00)	Agüero 66', 90+1'	Report	Drogba 82', 88'	Stadium: Vicente Calderón; Attendance: 36,284; Referee: Björn Kuipers (Netherlands)

25 November 2009 5	APOEL (Cyprus)	1–1	(Spain) Atlético Madrid	Nicosia, Cyprus
20:45 (21:45 UTC+2)	Mirosavljević 5'	Report	Simão 62'	Stadium: GSP Stadium; Attendance: 21,178; Referee: Frank De Bleeckere (Belgium)

8 December 2009 6	Atlético Madrid (Spain)	0–3	(Portugal) Porto	Madrid, Spain
20:45 CET (UTC+01:00)		Report	Alves 2'; Falcao 14'; Hulk 76'	Stadium: Vicente Calderón; Attendance: 24,603; Referee: Stéphane Lannoy (France)

=== UEFA Europa League ===
==== Last 32 ====
18 February 2010 First leg	Atlético Madrid (Spain)	1–1	(Turkey) Galatasaray	Madrid, Spain
21:05	Reyes 23'	Report	Keïta 77'	Stadium: Vicente Calderón; Attendance: 28,056; Referee: Aleksei Nikolaev (Russia)

25 February 2010 Second leg	Galatasaray (Turkey)	1–2 (2–3 agg.)	(Spain) Atlético Madrid	Istanbul, Turkey
19:00	Keïta 66'	Report	Simão 63'; Forlán 90'	Stadium: Ali Sami Yen; Attendance: 22,000; Referee: Gianluca Rocchi (Italy)

==== Last 16 ====
11 March 2010 First leg	Atlético Madrid (Spain)	0–0	(Portugal) Sporting CP	Madrid, Spain
21:05		Report		Stadium: Vicente Calderón; Attendance: 42,000; Referee: Pieter Vink (Netherlands)

18 March 2010 Second leg	Sporting CP (Portugal)	2–2 (2–2a agg.)	(Spain) Atlético Madrid	Lisbon, Portugal
21:05	Liédson 19'; Polga 45+1'	Report	Agüero 3', 33'	Stadium: José Alvalade; Attendance: 41,919; Referee: Knut Kircher (Germany)

==== Quarter-final ====
1 April 2010 First leg	Valencia (Spain)	2–2	(Spain) Atlético Madrid	Valencia, Spain
21:05	Fernandes 66'; Villa 82'	Report	Forlán 59'; López 72'	Stadium: Mestalla; Attendance: 50,000; Referee: Craig Thomson (Scotland)

8 April 2010 Second leg	Atlético Madrid (Spain)	0–0 (2a–2 agg.)	(Spain) Valencia	Madrid, Spain
21:05		Report		Stadium: Vicente Calderón; Attendance: 50,000; Referee: Florian Meyer (Germany)

==== Semi-final ====
22 April 2010 First leg	Atlético Madrid (Spain)	1–0	(England) Liverpool	Madrid, Spain
21:05	Forlán 9'	Report		Stadium: Vicente Calderón; Attendance: 52,000; Referee: Laurent Duhamel (France)

29 April 2010 Second leg	Liverpool (England)	2–1 (a.e.t.) (2–2a agg.)	(Spain) Atlético Madrid	Liverpool, England
21:05	Aquilani 44'; Benayoun 95'	Report	Forlán 102'	Stadium: Anfield; Attendance: 42,040; Referee: Terje Hauge (Norway)

==== Final ====
12 May 2010 Final	Atlético Madrid (Spain)	2–1 (a.e.t.)	(England) Fulham	Hamburg, Germany
20:45	Forlán 32', 116'	Report	Davies 37'	Stadium: HSH Nordbank Arena; Attendance: 49,000; Referee: Nicola Rizzoli (Italy)

== Statistics ==
=== Top scorers ===
Rank	Position	Number	Player	La Liga	Copa del Rey	UEFA Champions League	UEFA Europa League	Total
1	FW	7	(Uruguay) Diego Forlán	18	3	1	6	28
2	FW	10	(Argentina) Sergio Agüero	12	1	4	2	19
3	MF	9	(Spain) Jurado	7	2	0	0	9
4	MF	11	(Argentina) Maxi Rodríguez^{1}	2	5	1	0	8
5	MF	20	(Portugal) Simão	2	3	1	1	7
6	MF	19	(Spain) Reyes	2	1	0	1	4
7	DF	3	(Spain) Antonio López	2	0	0	1	3
7	MF	5	(Portugal) Tiago	2	1	0	0	3
7	FW	58	(Senegal) Ibrahima	3	0	0	0	3
10	MF	14	(Argentina) Eduardo Salvio	2	0	0	0	2
10	DF	16	(Spain) Juanito	2	0	0	0	2
12	MF	12	(Brazil) Paulo Assunção	1	0	0	0	1
12	FW	14	(France) Sinama Pongolle^{1}	0	1	0	0	1
12	DF	17	(Czech Republic) Tomáš Ujfaluši	0	1	0	0	1
12	DF	18	(Spain) Álvaro Domínguez	0	1	0	0	1
12	MF	23	(Brazil) Cléber Santana^{1}	1	0	0	0	1
Own goals				1	2	1	0	4
Totals				57	21	8	11	97

^{1}Player left the club during the season.
