= 2010–11 Atlético Madrid season =

105th season in existence of Atlético Madrid

Atlético Madrid
2010–11 season
- President: Enrique Cerezo
- Head coach: Quique Sánchez Flores
- Stadium: Vicente Calderón
- La Liga: 7th
- Copa del Rey: Quarter-finals
- UEFA Europa League: Group stage
- UEFA Super Cup: Winners
- Top goalscorer: League: Sergio Agüero (20); All: Sergio Agüero (27)
Home colours	Away colours

The 2010–11 season was the 105th season in Atlético Madrid's history and their 74th season in La Liga, the top division of Spanish football. It covers a period from 1 July 2010 to 30 June 2011.

Atlético Madrid competed for their tenth La Liga title and participated in the UEFA Europa League as holders, entering in the Group stage due to their seventh-place finish in the 2010–11 La Liga. They also entered the Copa del Rey in the quarter-finals, where they were eliminated by eventual winners Real Madrid.

This season was the first since 2003–04 without Pablo Ibáñez who departed for English club West Bromwich Albion.

== Kits ==
Supplier: Nike / Main Sponsor: Kia Motors / Back Sponsor: Kyocera / Shorts Sponsor: Paf

Home	Home alt. 1	Home alt. 2	Away	Away alt. 1	Away alt. 2	Goalkeeper 1	Goalkeeper 2	Goalkeeper 3

== Transfers ==
In (summer):

(Brazil) Filipe Luís: €12m from Deportivo La Coruña

(Uruguay) Diego Godín: €8m from Villarreal

(Spain) Fran Mérida: Free from Arsenal

(Brazil) Diego Costa: From Valladolid

(Spain) Mario Suárez: From RCD Mallorca

In (winter):

(Spain) Juanfran: €4m from Osasuna

(Brazil) Elías: From Corinthians

Out (summer):

(Spain) José Manuel Jurado: €13m to Schalke

(Spain) Pablo Ibanez: Free to West Brom

(Spain) Mariano Pernía: To Nacional

Out (winter):

(Portugal) Simão: €0.9m to Beşiktaş

(Spain) Ignacio Camacho: To Malaga

(Spain) Juanito: Free to Valladolid

== Squad ==
Note: Flags indicate national team as defined under FIFA eligibility rules; some limited exceptions apply. Players may hold more than one non-FIFA nationality.

No.	Pos.	Nation	Player
1	GK	ESP	Sergio Asenjo
2	DF	ESP	Juan Valera
3	DF	ESP	Antonio López (captain)
4	MF	ESP	Mario Suárez
5	MF	POR	Tiago Mendes (on loan from Juventus)
6	MF	ESP	Ignacio Camacho (until 22 December 2010)
7	FW	URU	Diego Forlán (vice-captain)
8	MF	ESP	Raúl García
9	MF	BRA	Elías
10	FW	ARG	Sergio Agüero (vice-captain since January 2011)
11	MF	ESP	Fran Mérida
12	MF	BRA	Paulo Assunção
13	GK	ESP	David de Gea
14	DF	BRA	Filipe Luís
15	DF	URU	Diego Godín

No.	Pos.	Nation	Player
16	DF	ESP	Juanito (until 11 January 2011)
17	DF	CZE	Tomáš Ujfaluši
18	DF	ESP	Álvaro Domínguez
19	MF	ESP	José Antonio Reyes
20	MF	POR	Simão Sabrosa (vice-captain until 22 December 2010)
20	MF	ESP	Juanfran Torres (from 11 January 2011)
21	DF	COL	Luis Perea
22	FW	BRA	Diego Costa
27	GK	ESP	Joel Robles
29	FW	ESP	Borja González
32	MF	ESP	Koke
43	DF	ESP	Jorge Pulido
49	FW	ESP	Alberto Perea
51	MF	ESP	Alberto Noguera

== Competitions ==
=== UEFA Super Cup ===
27 August 2010 UEFA Super Cup	Internazionale (Italy)	0 – 2	(Spain) Atlético Madrid	Monaco
20:45 CEST			Reyes 62'; Agüero 83'	Stadium: Stade Louis II; Attendance: 17,265; Referee: Massimo Busacca

=== La Liga ===
==== League table ====
Pos	Team	Pld	W	D	L	GF	GA	GD	Pts	Qualification or relegation
5	Sevilla	38	17	7	14	62	61	+1	58 (Note: SEV: 7 pts; ATH: 6 pts; ATM: 4 pts)	Qualification for the Europa League play-off round
6	Athletic Bilbao	38	18	4	16	59	55	+4	58	Qualification for the Europa League play-off round
7	Atlético Madrid	38	17	7	14	62	53	+9	58	Qualification for the Europa League third qualifying round (Note: The 2010–11 Copa del Rey champions (Real Madrid) and runners-up (Barcelona) qualified for the 2011–12 UEFA Champions League, thus the 7th-placed team qualified for the 2011–12 UEFA Europa League.)
8	Espanyol	38	15	4	19	46	55	−9	49	
9	Osasuna	38	13	8	17	45	46	−1	47 (Note: OSA 1–1 SPG; SPG 1–1 OSA)	

Source: LFP, sportec.es, Yahoo! Sport
Rules for classification: 1st points; 2nd head-to-head points; 3rd head-to-head goal difference; 4th head-to-head goals scored; 5th goal difference; 6th number of goals scored; 7th Fair-play points

==== Matches ====
30 August 2010 1	Atlético Madrid	4 – 0	Sporting Gijón	Madrid
22:00	Jurado 10'; Forlán 38', 64'; Simão 90+1'			Stadium: Vicente Calderón; Attendance: 50,000; Referee: Rafael Ramírez Domínguez

11 September 2010 2	Athletic Bilbao	1 – 2	Atlético Madrid	Bilbao
22:00	Llorente 88'		Forlán 10'; Tiago 80'	Stadium: San Mamés; Attendance: 40,000; Referee: Alfonso Pérez Burrull

19 September 2010 3	Atlético Madrid	1 – 2	Barcelona	Madrid
19:00	García 24'		Messi 12'; Piqué 31'	Stadium: Vicente Calderón; Attendance: 55,000; Referee: David Fernández Borbalán

22 September 2010 4	Valencia	1 – 1	Atlético Madrid	Valencia
22:00	Aduriz 84'		Simão 19'	Stadium: Mestalla Stadium; Attendance: 50,000; Referee: Eduardo Iturralde González

26 September 2010 5	Atlético Madrid	1 – 0	Real Zaragoza	Madrid
21:00	Costa 20'			Stadium: Vicente Calderón; Attendance: 40,000; Referee: César Muñiz Fernández

3 October 2010 6	Sevilla	3 – 1	Atlético Madrid	Seville
17:00	Negredo 28'; Perotti 35'; Kanouté 52'		Costa 58'	Stadium: Ramón Sánchez Pizjuán; Attendance: 40,000; Referee: Javier Estrada Fernández

16 October 2010 7	Atlético Madrid	2 – 0	Getafe	Madrid
18:00	Simão 37'; Costa 73'			Stadium: Vicente Calderón; Attendance: 50,000; Referee: Carlos Delgado Ferreiro

24 October 2010 8	Villarreal	2 – 0	Atlético Madrid	Villarreal
21:00	Cani 7'; Rossi 52'			Stadium: El Madrigal; Attendance: 21,000; Referee: Rafael Ramírez Domínguez

31 October 2010 9	Atlético Madrid	1 – 1	Almería	Madrid
19:00	Agüero 33'		Piatti 45'	Stadium: Vicente Calderón; Attendance: 35,000; Referee: Fernando Teixeira Vitienes

7 November 2010 10	Real Madrid	2 – 0	Atlético Madrid	Madrid
21:00	Carvalho 12'; Özil 19'			Stadium: Santiago Bernabéu; Attendance: 79,500; Referee: Antonio Miguel Mateu Lahoz

13 November 2010 11	Atlético Madrid	3 – 0	Osasuna	Madrid
20:00	Forlán 26', 70'; Agüero 40'			Stadium: Vicente Calderón; Attendance: 43,000; Referee: José Luis González González

21 November 2010 12	Real Sociedad	2 – 4	Atlético Madrid	San Sebastián
21:00	J. Llorente 11'; Rivas 86'		Forlán 71'; Agüero 79', 82'; Simão 90+4' (pen.)	Stadium: Anoeta Stadium; Attendance: 24,000; Referee: Miguel Angel Ayza Gámez

27 November 2010 13	Atlético Madrid	2 – 3	Espanyol	Madrid
22:00	Tiago 46'; Agüero 65'		García 21' (pen.); Verdú 53'; Osvaldo 78'	Stadium: Vicente Calderón; Attendance: 50,000; Referee: José Antonio Teixeira Vitienes

4 December 2010 14	Levante	2 – 0	Atlético Madrid	Valencia
18:00	Caicedo 2'; Nano 59'			Stadium: Ciutat de València; Attendance: 11,800; Referee: Alfonso J. Alvarez Izquierdo

11 December 2010 15	Atlético Madrid	2 – 0	Deportivo La Coruña	Madrid
22:00	Agüero 7', 35'			Stadium: Vicente Calderón; Attendance: 35,000; Referee: Javier Estrada Fernández

19 December 2010 16	Málaga	0 – 3	Atlético Madrid	Málaga
19:00			Tiago 21', 69'; Domínguez 66'	Stadium: La Rosaleda; Attendance: 29,000; Referee: Fernando Teixeira Vitienes

3 January 2011 17	Atlético Madrid	0 – 0	Racing Santander	Madrid
20:00				Stadium: Vicente Calderón; Attendance: 35,000; Referee: Javier Turienzo Alvarez

10 January 2011 18	Hércules	4 – 1	Atlético Madrid	Alicante
21:00	Tote 11'; Valdez 23'; Thomert 32'; Trezeguet 44'		Reyes 89'	Stadium: José Rico Pérez; Attendance: 24,000; Referee: José Luis Paradas Romero

17 January 2011 19	Atlético Madrid	3 – 0	Mallorca	Madrid
21:00	Valera 12'; Forlán 33'; Reyes 90+3'			Stadium: Vicente Calderón; Attendance: 30,000; Referee: Miguel Angel Ayza Gámez

23 January 2011 20	Sporting Gijón	1 – 0	Atlético Madrid	Gijón
22:00	Barral 51'			Stadium: El Molinón; Attendance: 23,000; Referee: Javier Estrada Fernández

30 January 2011 21	Atlético Madrid	0 – 2	Athletic Bilbao	Madrid
17:00			Toquero 51', 64'	Stadium: Vicente Calderón; Attendance: 35,000; Referee: Fernando Teixeira Vitienes

5 February 2011 22	Barcelona	3 – 0	Atlético Madrid	Barcelona
19:00	Messi 17', 27', 79'			Stadium: Camp Nou; Attendance: 84,766; Referee: Javier Turienzo Alvarez

12 February 2011 23	Atlético Madrid	1 – 2	Valencia	Madrid
18:00	Reyes 2'		Joaquín 40', 86'	Stadium: Vicente Calderón; Attendance: 40,000; Referee: David Fernández Borbalán

19 February 2011 24	Real Zaragoza	0 – 1	Atlético Madrid	Zaragoza
21:00			Agüero 65'	Stadium: La Romareda; Attendance: 17,000; Referee: Carlos Delgado Ferreiro

26 February 2011 25	Atlético Madrid	2 – 2	Sevilla	Madrid
18:00	Koke 47'; Reyes 76'		Negredo 41'; Rakitić 65'	Stadium: Vicente Calderón; Attendance: 48,000; Referee: Antonio Miguel Mateu Lahoz

2 March 2011 26	Getafe	1 – 1	Atlético Madrid	Getafe
20:00	Manu 3'		Elias 81'	Stadium: Alfonso Pérez; Referee: Carlos Clos Gómez

5 March 2011 27	Atlético Madrid	3 – 1	Villarreal	Madrid
22:00	Reyes 4'; Agüero 68'; Forlán 72'		Rossi 33'	Stadium: Vicente Calderón; Attendance: 30,000; Referee: Eduardo Iturralde González

12 March 2011 28	Almería	2 – 2	Atlético Madrid	Almería
18:00	Crusat 49'; Goitom 77'		Agüero 38', 61'	Stadium: Juegos Mediterráneos; Attendance: 13,228; Referee: Ignacio Iglesias Villanueva

29 March 2011 29	Atlético Madrid	1 – 2	Real Madrid	Madrid
22:00	Agüero 86'		Benzema 10'; Özil 31'	Stadium: Vicente Calderón; Attendance: 53,000; Referee: Fernando Teixeira Vitienes

3 April 2011 30	Osasuna	2 – 3	Atlético Madrid	Pamplona
21:00	Sola 31'; Nekounam 80' (pen.)		Costa 38', 61', 63'	Stadium: El Sadar; Attendance: 15,686; Referee: David Fernández Borbalán

10 April 2011 31	Atlético Madrid	3 – 0	Real Sociedad	Madrid
19:00	Filipe Luís 11'; Suárez 44'; Agüero 78'			Stadium: Vicente Calderón; Attendance: 50,000; Referee: Alfonso J. Alvarez Izquierdo

17 April 2011 32	Espanyol	2 – 2	Atlético Madrid	Cornellà de Llobregat
21:00	Osvaldo 37', 57'		Koke 1'; Agüero 49'	Stadium: Estadi Cornellà-El Prat; Attendance: 28,110; Referee: Antonio Miguel Mateu Lahoz

24 April 2010 33	Atlético Madrid	4 – 1	Levante	Madrid
18:00	Elias 18'; Agüero 50', 70' (pen.); Munúa 84' (o.g.)		Caicedo 39' (pen.)	Stadium: Vicente Calderón; Attendance: 50,000; Referee: Javier Estrada Fernández

30 April 2011 34	Deportivo La Coruña	0 – 1	Atlético Madrid	A Coruña
22:00			Agüero 80'	Stadium: Estadio Riazor; Attendance: 34,000; Referee: Javier Turienzo Alvarez

7 May 2011 35	Atlético Madrid	0 – 3	Málaga	Madrid
20:00			Rondón 28'; Baptista 34'; Maresca 84'	Stadium: Vicente Calderón; Attendance: 40,000; Referee: Ignacio Iglesias Villanueva

10 May 2011 36	Racing de Santander	2 – 1	Atlético Madrid	Santander
21:00	Kennedy 37'; Rosenberg 48'		Suárez 10'	Stadium: El Sardinero; Attendance: 16,000; Referee: José Luis González González

15 May 2011 37	Atlético Madrid	2 – 1	Hércules	Madrid
21:00	Domínguez 1'; Reyes 71'		Trezeguet 67'	Stadium: Vicente Calderón; Attendance: 20,000; Referee: Eduardo Iturralde González

21 May 2011 38	Mallorca	3 – 4	Atlético Madrid	Palma, Majorca
22:00	De Guzmán 62' (pen.); Webó 71', 90+2'		Agüero 11', 59', 81'; Juanfran 17'	Stadium: Iberostar Stadium; Attendance: 20,000; Referee: Antonio Miguel Mateu Lahoz

=== Copa Del Rey ===
==== Round of 32 ====
27 October 2010 Round of 32 (First leg)	Universidad Las Palmas	0 – 5	Atlético Madrid	Las Palmas
21:00 GMT		Report	Godín 23'; Agüero 41', 52'; Costa 48'; Mérida 83'	Stadium: Estadio Gran Canaria; Attendance: 13,161

10 November 2010 Round of 32 (Second leg)	Atlético Madrid	1 – 1 (6 – 1 agg.)	Universidad Las Palmas	Madrid
21:00 CET	Mérida 72'	Report	Aridane 16'	Stadium: Vicente Calderón Stadium; Attendance: 5,000

==== Round of 16 ====
22 December 2010 Round of 16 (First leg)	Atlético Madrid	1 – 0	Espanyol	Madrid
20:00 CET	Simão 33' (pen.)	Report		Stadium: Vicente Calderón Stadium; Attendance: 18,000; Referee: David Fernández Borbalán

6 January 2011 Round of 16 (Second leg)	Espanyol	1 – 1 (1 – 2 agg.)	Atlético Madrid	Cornellà de Llobregat
20:00 CET	L. García 90+2'	Report	Agüero 24'	Stadium: RCDE Stadium; Attendance: 25,000

==== Quarter-finals ====
13 January 2011 Quarter-finals (First leg)	Real Madrid	3 – 1	Atlético Madrid	Madrid
22:00 CET	Ramos 14'; Ronaldo 61'; Özil 90'	Report	Forlán 7'	Stadium: Santiago Bernabéu Stadium; Attendance: 75,000; Referee: Antonio Mateu Lahoz

20 January 2011 Quarter-finals (Second leg)	Atlético Madrid	0 – 1 (1 – 4 agg.)	Real Madrid	Madrid
22:00 CET		Report	Ronaldo 23'	Stadium: Vicente Calderón Stadium; Attendance: 52,000

=== UEFA Europa League ===
==== Group stage ====
Pos	Team	Pld	W	D	L	GF	GA	GD	Pts	Qualification	LEV	ARI	ATL	RBK
1	(Germany) Bayer Leverkusen	6	3	3	0	8	2	+6	12	Advance to knockout phase	—	1–0	1–1	4–0
2	(Greece) Aris	6	3	1	2	7	5	+2	10	Advance to knockout phase	0–0	—	1–0	2–0
3	(Spain) Atlético Madrid	6	2	2	2	9	7	+2	8		1–1	2–3	—	3–0
4	(Norway) Rosenborg	6	1	0	5	3	13	−10	3		0–1	2–1	1–2	—

Source: Soccerway

16 September 2010	Aris (Greece)	1 – 0	(Spain) Atlético Madrid	Thessaloniki, Greece
19:00 EEST	Javito 59'	Report		Stadium: Kleanthis Vikelidis Stadium; Attendance: 16,699; Referee: Mark Clattenburg (England)

30 September 2010	Atlético Madrid (Spain)	1 – 1	(Germany) Bayer Leverkusen	Madrid, Spain
21:05 CEST	Simão 51' (pen.)	Report	Derdiyok 39'	Stadium: Vicente Calderón Stadium; Attendance: 28,502; Referee: Paolo Tagliavento (Italy)

21 October 2010	Atlético Madrid (Spain)	3 – 0	(Norway) Rosenborg	Madrid, Spain
21:05 CEST	Godín 17'; Agüero 66'; Costa 78'	Report		Stadium: Vicente Calderón Stadium; Attendance: 28,472; Referee: Cyril Zimmermann (Switzerland)

4 November 2010	Rosenborg (Norway)	1 – 2	(Spain) Atlético Madrid	Trondheim, Norway
19:00 CET	Henriksen 52'	Report	Agüero 4'; Tiago 84'	Stadium: Lerkendal Stadion; Attendance: 14,248; Referee: Vladislav Bezborodov (Russia)

1 December 2010	Atlético Madrid (Spain)	2 – 3	(Greece) Aris	Madrid, Spain
21:05 CET	Forlán 11'; Agüero 16'	Report	Koke 2', 51' (pen.); Lazaridis 81'	Stadium: Vicente Calderón Stadium; Attendance: 21,154; Referee: Ivan Bebek (Croatia)

16 December 2010	Bayer Leverkusen (Germany)	1 – 1	(Spain) Atlético Madrid	Leverkusen, Germany
19:00 CET	Helmes 69'	Report	Mérida 72'	Stadium: BayArena; Attendance: 18,903; Referee: Alexandru Dan Tudor (Romania)

== Statistics ==
=== Top scorers ===
Rank	Position	Number	Player	La Liga	UEFA Super Cup	Copa del Rey	UEFA Europa League	Total
1	FW	10	(Argentina) Sergio Agüero	20	1	3	3	27
2	FW	7	(Uruguay) Diego Forlán	8	0	1	1	10
3	FW	22	(Brazil) Diego Costa	6	0	1	1	8
4	MF	19	(Spain) José Antonio Reyes	6	1	0	0	7
5	MF	20	(Portugal) Simão^{1}	4	0	1	1	6
6	MF	5	(Portugal) Tiago	4	0	0	1	5
7	MF	11	(Spain) Fran Mérida	0	0	2	1	3
8	MF	4	(Spain) Mario Suárez	2	0	0	0	2
8	MF	9	(Brazil) Elias	2	0	0	0	2
8	DF	15	(Uruguay) Diego Godín	0	0	1	1	2
8	DF	18	(Spain) Álvaro Domínguez	2	0	0	0	2
8	MF	32	(Spain) Koke	2	0	0	0	2
13	DF	2	(Spain) Juan Valera	1	0	0	0	1
13	MF	8	(Spain) Raúl García	1	0	0	0	1
13	MF	9	(Spain) Jurado^{1}	1	0	0	0	1
13	DF	14	(Brazil) Filipe Luís	1	0	0	0	1
13	MF	20	(Spain) Juanfran	1	0	0	0	1
Own goals				1	0	0	0	1
Totals				62	2	9	9	82

^{1}Player left the club during the season.
