= 2011–12 Atlético Madrid season =

106th season in existence of Atlético Madrid

Atlético Madrid
2011–12 season
- President: Enrique Cerezo
- Head coach: Gregorio Manzano (until 22 December); Diego Simeone (from 23 December)
- Stadium: Vicente Calderón
- La Liga: 5th
- Copa del Rey: Round of 32
- UEFA Europa League: Winners
- Top goalscorer: League: Radamel Falcao (24); All: Radamel Falcao (36)
Home colours	Away colours

The 2011–12 season was the 106th season in Atlético Madrid's history and their 75th season in La Liga, the top division of Spanish football. It covers a period from 1 July 2011 to 30 June 2012.

Atlético Madrid competed for their tenth La Liga title and participated in the UEFA Europa League, entering in the Third qualifying round due to their seventh-place finish in the 2010–11 La Liga. They also entered the Copa del Rey in the Round of 32 where they were eliminated by Segunda B club Albecete 3–1 on aggregate. On 9 May 2012, They won the Europa League after beating Athletic Bilbao 3–0 in the final to give Diego Simeone his first trophy with the club when he was appointed in December after the sacking of Gregorio Manzano.

== Kits ==
Supplier: Nike / Main Sponsors: Rixos Hotels, Huawei (both temporary) / Back Sponsor: Kyocera

Home	Home alt.	Away	Away alt.	Goalkeeper 1	Goalkeeper 2	Goalkeeper 3	Goalkeeper 4

== Players ==
=== Squad information ===
As of 16 September 2011

No.	Nationality	Name	Date of Birth (Age)	Signed in	Signed from	Apps.	Goals	Notes
Goalkeepers
13	(Belgium)	Thibaut Courtois	11 May 1992 (aged 19)	2011	(England) Chelsea	4	0	On loan
25	(Spain)	Sergio Asenjo	28 June 1989 (aged 22)	2009	Valladolid	24	0	
Defenders
2	(Uruguay)	Diego Godín	16 February 1986 (aged 25)	2010	Villarreal	31	2	
3	(Spain)	Antonio López (C)	13 September 1981 (aged 30)	2001	Youth system	266	13	
6	(Brazil)	Filipe Luís	9 August 1985 (aged 26)	2010	Deportivo La Coruña	41	1	
17	(Portugal)	Sílvio	28 September 1987 (aged 23)	2011	(Portugal) Braga	6	0	
18	(Spain)	Álvaro Domínguez (2nd VC)	15 May 1989 (aged 22)	2008	Youth system	83	2	
21	(Colombia)	Luis Perea (VC)	31 January 1979 (aged 32)	2004	(Argentina) Boca Juniors	277	0	
23	(Brazil)	Miranda	7 September 1984 (aged 27)	2011	(Brazil) São Paulo	4	0	
Midfielders
4	(Spain)	Mario Suárez	24 February 1987 (aged 24)	2010	Mallorca	43	2	
5	(Portugal)	Tiago	2 May 1981 (aged 30)	2011	(Italy) Juventus	68	8	
8	(Argentina)	Eduardo Salvio	13 July 1990 (aged 21)	2010	(Argentina) Lanús	21	3	
11	(Turkey)	Arda Turan	30 January 1987 (aged 24)	2011	(Turkey) Galatasaray	3	0	
12	(Brazil)	Paulo Assunção	25 January 1980 (aged 31)	2008	(Portugal) Porto	123	1	
14	(Spain)	Gabi (3rd VC)	10 July 1983 (aged 28)	2001	Zaragoza	65	2	Originally from youth system
19	(Spain)	Koke	8 January 1992 (aged 19)	2009	Youth system	24	2	
20	(Spain)	Juanfran	9 January 1985 (aged 26)	2011	Osasuna	23	1	
22	(Brazil)	Diego	28 February 1985 (aged 26)	2011	(Germany) VfL Wolfsburg	2	1	On loan
Forwards
7	(Spain)	Adrián	8 January 1988 (aged 23)	2011	Deportivo La Coruña	7	3	
9	(Colombia)	Radamel Falcao	10 February 1986 (aged 25)	2011	(Portugal) Porto	2	1	
15	(Portugal)	Pizzi	6 October 1989 (aged 21)	2011	(Portugal) Braga	0	0	On loan

== Transfers ==
=== In ===
No.	Pos.	Nat.	Name	Age	EU	Moving from	Type	Transfer window	Ends	Transfer fee	Source
7	FW	(Spain)	Adrián López	23	EU	Deportivo La Coruña	Transfer	Summer	2015	Free	Theguardian.com
9	FW	(Colombia)	Radamel Falcao	25	Non-EU	Porto (Portugal)	Transfer	Summer		€40M	Goal.com
11	MF	(Turkey)	Arda Turan	24	Non-EU	Galatasaray (Turkey)	Transfer	Summer		€12M	Goal.com
13	GK	(Belgium)	Thibaut Courtois	19	EU	Chelsea (England)	Loan	Summer	2012	N/A	BBC.co.uk
	MF	(Portugal)	Pizzi	21	EU	Braga (Portugal)	Loan	Summer	2012	N/A	Goal.com
17	DF	(Portugal)	Sílvio	23	EU	Braga (Portugal)	Transfer	Summer	2016		TNT Sports
22	MF	(Brazil)	Diego	26	Non-EU	Wolfsburg (Germany)	Loan	Summer	2012	N/A	FourFourTwo.com
23	DF	(Brazil)	Miranda	25	Non-EU	São Paulo (Brazil)	Transfer	Summer	2014	Free	UEFA.com
	MF	(Portugal)	Rúben Micael	25	EU	Porto (Portugal)	Transfer	Summer		€5M	Goal.com

=== Out ===
No.	Pos.	Nat.	Name	Age	EU	Moving to	Type	Transfer window	Transfer fee	Source
9	MF	(Brazil)	Elias	26	EU	Sporting CP (Portugal)	Transfer	Summer	€8.85M	Eurosport.com
7	FW	(Uruguay)	Diego Forlán	32	EU	Internazionale (Italy)	Transfer	Summer	€5M	Inter.it
	FW	(Senegal)	Ibrahima	20	EU	Osasuna	Transfer	Summer	Free	Marca.com
17	CB	(Czech Republic)	Tomáš Ujfaluši	33	EU	Galatasaray (Turkey)	Transfer	Summer	€2M	Marca.com
13	GK	(Spain)	David de Gea	20	EU	Manchester United (England)	Transfer	Summer	€21M	AS.com
10	FW	(Argentina)	Sergio Agüero	23	EU	Manchester City (England)	Transfer	Summer	€45M	Skysports.com
10	MF	(Spain)	José Antonio Reyes	28	EU	Sevilla	Transfer	Winter	€3.5M+€1M in variables	Sevillafc.es
1	GK	(Spain)	Joel	21	EU	Rayo Vallecano	Loan	Winter	N/A	AS.com
–	FW	(Brazil)	Diego Costa	23	Non-EU	Rayo Vallecano	Loan	Winter	N/A	MARCA.com
	MF	(Portugal)	Rúben Micael	25	EU	Zaragoza	Loan	Summer	N/A	Goal.com

== Club ==
=== Coaching staff ===
Position	Staff
Head coach	Diego Simeone
2nd coach	Juan Vizcaíno
Technical coaches	Rubén Baraja, Toni Servera, Joan Mesquida
Team delegate	Pedro Pablo Matesanz
Kit managers	Cirilo Gutiérrez, Cristian Bautista

Source: Clubatleticomadrid.com

=== Team stats ===
No.	Pos.	Name	Total		La Liga		Copa del Rey		UEFA Europa League	
No.	Pos.	Name	Apps	Goals	Apps	Goals	Apps	Goals	Apps	Goals
13	GK	(Belgium) Courtois	52	0	37	0	0	0	15	0
25	GK	(Spain) S. Asenjo	5	0	1+1	0	2	0	1	0
2	DF	(Uruguay) Godín	41	3	26+1	2	1	0	13	1
3	DF	(Spain) A. López	7	0	2	0	1	0	3+1	0
6	DF	(Brazil) Filipe Luís	53	0	36	0	1	0	16+1	0
17	DF	(Portugal) Sílvio	14	0	8+1	0	0	0	4+1	0
18	DF	(Spain) Domínguez	41	4	22+6	3	1	0	8+4	1
21	DF	(Colombia) Perea	34	0	11+8	0	0	0	12+3	0
23	DF	(Brazil) Miranda	44	2	25+2	1	1+1	0	14+1	1
28	DF	(Spain) Manquillo	1	0	0	0	1	0	0	0
4	MF	(Spain) M. Suárez	42	0	23+5	0	0	0	14	0
5	MF	(Portugal) Tiago	32	0	22+2	0	0	0	5+3	0
8	MF	(Argentina) Salvio	49	8	17+14	3	1+1	0	6+10	5
11	MF	(Turkey) Arda	45	5	24+9	3	0	0	10+2	2
12	MF	(Brazil) Assunção	17	0	5+4	0	2	0	4+2	0
14	MF	(Spain) Gabi	49	3	30+1	2	1	0	16+1	1
16	MF	(Spain) Fran Mérida	3	0	0+3	0	0	0	0	0
19	MF	(Spain) Koke	40	2	11+14	2	2	0	8+5	0
20	MF	(Spain) Juanfran	44	1	23+3	0	2	0	10+6	1
22	MF	(Brazil) Diego	43	6	27+3	3	1	0	11+1	3
48	MF	(Spain) Saúl	1	0	0	0	0	0	0+1	0
7	FW	(Spain) Adrián	57	19	27+9	7	2	1	17+2	11
9	FW	(Colombia) Falcao	50	36	33+1	24	1+1	0	13+2	12
15	FW	(Portugal) Pizzi	16	1	0+11	1	1+1	0	1+2	0
41	FW	(Spain) Pedro	2	0	0+1	0	0+1	0	0	0
–	GK	(Spain) Joel	3	0	0	0	0	0	3	0
–	DF	(Spain) Pulido	1	0	0	0	1	0	0	0
–	MF	(Spain) Raúl García	2	0	0	0	0	0	0+2	0
–	MF	(Brazil) Elias	2	2	0	0	0	0	0+2	2
–	MF	(Spain) Reyes	19	3	7+5	0	0	0	5+2	3
–	FW	(Uruguay) Forlán	2	0	0	0	0	0	2	0
–	FW	(Brazil) Diego Costa	0	0	0	0	0	0	0	0

Note:Italic denotes no longer with club.

Last updated: 13 May

=== Goalscorers ===
Rank	No.	Pos.	Player	La Liga	Copa del Rey	Europa League	Total
1	9	FW	(Colombia) Radamel Falcao	24	0	12	36
2	7	FW	(Spain) Adrián	7	1	11	19
3	8	MF	(Argentina) Eduardo Salvio	3	0	5	8
4	22	MF	(Brazil) Diego	3	0	3	6
5	11	MF	(Turkey) Arda Turan	3	0	2	5
6	18	DF	(Spain) Álvaro Domínguez	3	0	1	4
7	3	DF	(Uruguay) Diego Godín	2	0	1	3
7	14	MF	(Spain) Gabi	2	0	1	3
7	19	MF	(Spain) José Antonio Reyes	0	0	3	3
10	9	MF	(Brazil) Elias	0	0	2	3
10	19	MF	(Spain) Koke	2	0	0	2
10	23	DF	(Brazil) Miranda	1	0	1	2
13	15	FW	(Portugal) Pizzi	1	0	0	1
13	20	MF	(Spain) Juanfran	0	0	1	1
Own goals				2	0	0	2
TOTALS				53	1	43	97

== Competitions ==
=== Pre-season ===
10 July 2011 Friendly match	Arcángel de San Rafael	1–19	Atlético Madrid	Segovia
19:30 CEST	Rafita 16'		Reyes 2', 34'; Pedro 13', 16', 27', 38'; Filipe Luís 19', 32'; Collado 23', 31', 37'; Koke 24'; Mérida 47'; Gabi 50'; Costa 58', 72', 80'; Saúl 62', 66'	Stadium: Complejo Residencial; Attendance: 300

14 July 2011 Friendly match	Gimnástica Segoviana	0–8	Atlético Madrid	Segovia
21:00 CEST			Regalón 5'; Filipe Luís 16'; Collado 21'; Pedro 25'; Costa 50', 82'; Juanfran 66'; Mérida 71'	Stadium: La Albuera

16 July 2011 Friendly match	Alcalá	0–1	Atlético Madrid	Alcalá
21:00 CEST			Pedro 77'	Stadium: Municipal del Val

21 July 2011 Triangular (45 mins)	Atlético Madrid	0–1	Beşiktaş	Granada
21:00 CEST			Ernst 27'	Stadium: Los Cármenes

21 July 2011 Triangular (45 mins)	Granada	1–0	Atlético Madrid	Granada
22:00 CEST	Romero 34'			Stadium: Los Cármenes

12 August 2011 Trofeo Colombino	Recreativo	1–2	Atlético Madrid	Huelva
20:00 CEST	Vega		Adrián 32'; Salvio	Stadium: Nuevo Colombino

=== Mid-season friendlies ===
10 November 2011	Zamalek	1–4	Atlético Madrid	Cairo Stadium
20:00 UTC+2	Mido 25' (pen.)		Salvio 12', 14'; Diego 51', 74'	Attendance: 44490; Referee: Samir Osman (Egypt)
Note: Zamalek SC Centennial.

=== La Liga ===
==== League table ====
Pos	Team	Pld	W	D	L	GF	GA	GD	Pts	Qualification or relegation
3	Valencia	38	17	10	11	59	44	+15	61	Qualification for the Champions League group stage
4	Málaga	38	17	7	14	54	53	+1	58	Qualification for the Champions League play-off round
5	Atlético Madrid	38	15	11	12	53	46	+7	56	Qualification for the Europa League group stage (Note: Atlético Madrid won the 2011–12 UEFA Europa League and thus secured the title holder spot in the group stage of the 2012–13 UEFA Europa League.)
6	Levante	38	16	7	15	54	50	+4	55	Qualification for the Europa League play-off round (Note: Athletic Bilbao qualified for the third qualifying round of the 2012–13 UEFA Europa League as runners-up of the 2011–12 Copa del Rey to Barcelona, who have qualified for the 2012–13 UEFA Champions League. Consequently, Levante entered the play-off round.)
7	Osasuna	38	13	15	10	44	61	−17	54	

Source: ESPN
Rules for classification: 1st points; 2nd head-to-head points; 3rd head-to-head goal difference; 4th head-to-head goals scored; 5th goal difference; 6th number of goals scored; 7th Fair-play points

==== Results by round ====
Round	1	2	3	4	5	6	7	8	9	10	11	12	13	14	15	16	17	18	19	20	21	22	23	24	25	26	27	28	29	30	31	32	33	34	35	36	37	38
Ground	A	H	A	H	H	A	H	A	H	A	H	A	H	A	H	A	H	A	H	H	A	H	A	A	H	A	H	A	H	A	H	A	H	A	H	A	H	A
Result	W	D	L	W	W	L	D	D	D	L	W	L	W	L	W	L	L	D	W	D	W	D	D	D	L	D	W	L	W	L	W	L	L	W	W	D	W	W
Position	8	13	15	9	8	8	8	8	9	12	10	11	9	11	8	10	10	11	10	5	7	6	6	6	5	5	5	5	5	5	5	5	5	5	5	5	5	5

Updated to match(es) played on 13 May 2012. Source: La Liga
A = Away; H = Home; W = Win; D = Draw; L = Loss

==== Matches ====
Win Draw Loss Postponed

Kickoff times are in CET.

21 August 2011 1	Real Sociedad	v	Atlético Madrid	San Sebastián
--:--				Stadium: Anoeta
Note: Postponed due to AFE strike after failing to reach a collective bargaining agreement with the LFP.

28 August 2011 2	Atlético Madrid	0–0	Osasuna	Madrid
12:00	Perea (yellow card) 71'	Report		Stadium: Vicente Calderón; Attendance: 48,112; Referee: Ayza Gámez (Valencian Community)

11 September 2011 3	Valencia	1–0	Atlético Madrid	Valencia
22:00	Soldado 52', (yellow card) 52'	Report	Suárez (yellow card) 41'; Tiago (yellow card) 61'	Stadium: Mestalla; Attendance: 40,000; Referee: González González (Castile and León)

18 September 2011 4	Atlético Madrid	4–0	Racing Santander	Madrid
18:00 CET	Falcao 23', 36' (pen.), 55'; Suárez (yellow card) 31'; Perea (yellow card) 72'; Adrián 78', (yellow card) 89'	Report	Acosta (yellow card) 75'; Osmar (yellow card) 84'	Stadium: Vicente Calderón; Attendance: 40,000; Referee: Iglesias Villanueva (Galicia)

21 September 2011 5	Atlético Madrid	4–0	Sporting Gijón	Madrid
20:00	Lora 28' (o.g.); Assunção (yellow card) 43'; Koke (yellow card) 67'; Domínguez 68'; Falcao 72', 81'	Report	Lora (yellow card) 2'; Suárez (yellow card) 23'; Carmelo (yellow card) 33'; Rivera (yellow card) 90+2'	Stadium: Vicente Calderón; Attendance: 35,000; Referee: Iturralde González (Basque Country)

24 September 2011 6	Barcelona	5–0	Atlético Madrid	Barcelona
22:00	Villa 9'; Miranda 15' (o.g.); Messi 26', 78', 90'; Piqué (yellow card) 71'	Report	Perea (yellow card) 72'	Stadium: Camp Nou; Attendance: 83,154; Referee: Delgado Ferreiro (Basque Country)

2 October 2011 7	Atlético Madrid	0–0	Sevilla	Madrid
18:00	Turan (yellow card) 16'; Sílvio (yellow card) 32'; Godín (yellow card) 57'; Suárez (yellow card) 70'; Domínguez (yellow card) 89'	Report	Kanouté (yellow card) 8'; Coke (yellow card) 26'; Medel (yellow card) 34'; Manu (yellow card) 42'; Spahić (yellow card) 43'; Cáceres (yellow card) 69'	Stadium: Vicente Calderón; Attendance: 40,000; Referee: Undiano Mallenco (Navarre)

15 October 2011 8	Granada	0–0	Atlético Madrid	Granada
22:00	Rico (yellow card) 24'; Martins (yellow card) 42'; Nyom (yellow card) 68'	Report	Gabi (yellow card) 28'; Tiago (yellow card) 50'; Juanfran (yellow card) 53'; Miranda (yellow card) 76'; Assunção (yellow card) 79'	Stadium: Los Cármenes; Attendance: 21,000; Referee: Turienzo Álvarez (Castile and León)

23 October 2011 9	Atlético Madrid	1–1	Mallorca	Madrid
18:00	Falcao 43' (pen.); Turan (yellow card) 56'; Suárez (yellow card) 61'	Report	Hemed 2' (pen.); Ramis (yellow card) 42'; Chico (yellow card) 47'; Bigas (yellow card) 54'; Tissone (yellow card) 68'; Akihiro (yellow card) 84'; Castro (yellow card) 84'	Stadium: Vicente Calderón; Attendance: 35,000; Referee: Fernández Borbalán (Andalusia)

27 October 2011 10	Athletic Bilbao	3–0	Atlético Madrid	Bilbao
22:00	Martínez (yellow card) 17'; Aurtenetxe (yellow card) 37'; Llorente 67', 70'; Toquero 74'; Ekiza (yellow card) 80'	Report	Godín (yellow card) 31'; Miranda (yellow card) 52'; Sílvio (yellow card) 66'; Assunçao (yellow card) 81'; Salvio (yellow card) 85'	Stadium: San Mamés; Attendance: 30,000; Referee: Teixeira Vitienes (Cantabria)

30 October 2011 11	Atlético Madrid	3–1	Zaragoza	Madrid
20:00	Adrián 19', 75'; Suárez (yellow card) 24'; Domínguez 31'; Gabi (yellow card) 34'; Filipe Luís (yellow card) 90+2'	Report	Meira (yellow card) 44'; Ponzio (yellow card) 55'; Rúben Micael (yellow card) 59'; Postiga 79'	Stadium: Vicente Calderón; Attendance: 48,500; Referee: Estrada Fernández (Catalonia)

6 November 2011 12	Getafe	3–2	Atlético Madrid	Getafe
22:00	Lacen (yellow card) 11'; Míchel (yellow card) 13', (goal) 49'; Lopo (red card) 28'; Ríos (yellow card) 31'; Güiza (yellow card) 32'; Barrada 40'; Castro (yellow card) 65', (goal) 83' (pen.)	Report	Filipe Luís (yellow card) 8'; López (yellow card) 18'; Falcao 30' (pen.); Tiago (yellow card) 39'; Salvio (yellow card) 71'; Domínguez 80', (yellow card) 90+4'; Turan (yellow card) 82'	Stadium: Alfonso Pérez; Attendance: 8,000; Referee: Pérez Lasa (Basque Country)

20 November 2011 13	Atlético Madrid	3–2	Levante	Madrid
20:00	Turan (yellow card) 15'; Adrián (yellow card) 40', (goal) 74'; Domínguez (yellow card) 52'; Pizzi 68'; Diego 83'	Report	El Zhar (yellow card) 34'; Torres 72'; Iborra (yellow card) 89'; Suárez 90+2'	Stadium: Vicente Calderón; Attendance: 27,000; Referee: Pérez Montero (Andalusia)

26 November 2011 14	Real Madrid	4–1	Atlético Madrid	Madrid
20:00	Ronaldo 24' (pen.), 82' (pen.); Alonso (yellow card) 40'; Di María 49'; Higuaín 65'	Report	Adrián 15'; Diego (yellow card) 18'; Courtois (red card) 22'; Turan (yellow card) 27'; Perea (yellow card) 33'; Gabi (yellow card) 36'; Filipe Luís (yellow card) 67'; Godín (red card) 81'	Stadium: Santiago Bernabéu; Attendance: 80,315; Referee: Mateu Lahoz (Valencian Community)

4 December 2011 15	Atlético Madrid	3–1	Rayo Vallecano	Madrid
17:00	Gabi 25'; Diego (yellow card) 69'; Falcao 74'; Salvio 90+1'	Report	Fuego (yellow card) 60'; Bangoura (yellow card) 62'; Jordi (yellow card) 78'; Gabi 90+2' (o.g.)	Stadium: Vicente Calderón; Attendance: 50,000; Referee: Clos Gómez (Aragon)

11 December 2011 16	Espanyol	4–2	Atlético Madrid	Cornellà de Llobregat
17:00	Verdú 5', 7'; Romaric 19'; Forlín (yellow card) 27'; García (yellow card) 40', (goal) 54'; Baena (yellow card) 63'	Report	Falcao 32'; Assunção (yellow card) 65'; Perea (yellow card) 75'; Miranda (yellow card) 84'; Turan 83'; Godín (yellow card) 90+1'	Stadium: Cornellà-El Prat; Attendance: 20,823; Referee: Paradas Romero (Andalusia)

18 December 2011 17	Atlético Madrid	0–2	Real Betis	Madrid
12:00	Domínguez (yellow card) 29'; Assunção (yellow card) 40'; Gabi (yellow card) 80'	Report	Cañas (yellow card) 44'; Pozuelo 54', (yellow card) 56' (yellow-red card) 72'; Iriney (yellow card) 58'; Nacho (yellow card) 71'; Casto (yellow card) 87'; Santa Cruz 90+1'	Stadium: Vicente Calderón; Attendance: 40,000; Referee: González González (Castile and León)

7 January 2012 18	Málaga	0–0	Atlético Madrid	Málaga
22:00	Demichelis (yellow card) 58'; Sánchez (yellow card) 62'; Apoño (yellow card) 90+3'	Report	Domínguez (yellow card) 22'; Diego (yellow card) 27'; Tiago (yellow card) 59'; Falcao (yellow card) 66'; Perea (yellow card) 90'	Stadium: La Rosaleda; Attendance: 30,000; Referee: Teixeira Vitienes (Cantabria)

15 January 2012 19	Atlético Madrid	3–0	Villarreal	Madrid
12:00	Falcao 40', 51' (pen.); Turan (yellow card) 59'; Tiago (yellow card) 62'; Diego (yellow card) 71', (goal) 80'	Report	López (yellow card) 50'	Stadium: Vicente Calderón; Attendance: 48,000; Referee: Turienzo Álvarez (Castile and León)

22 January 2012 1	Real Sociedad	0–4	Atlético Madrid	San Sebastián
20:00	Demidov (yellow card) 2'; Aranburu (yellow card) 11'; Mikel (yellow card) 71'	Report	Falcao 3' (pen.), 83', 90+1', (yellow card) 88'; Miranda (yellow card) 25'; Suárez (yellow card) 29'; Adrián 47'; Gabi (yellow card) 59'; Filipe Luís (yellow card) 62'; Juanfran (yellow card) 67'; Diego (yellow card) 71'	Stadium: Anoeta; Attendance: 24,000; Referee: Muñiz Fernández (Asturias)

30 January 2012 21	Osasuna	0–1	Atlético Madrid	Pamplona
21:00	Lekić (yellow card) 31'; García (yellow card) 55'; Puñal (yellow card) 90'	Report	Godín 40'; Falcao (yellow card) 43'; Tiago (yellow card) 65'; Courtois (yellow card) 90+2'	Stadium: El Sadar; Attendance: 15,010; Referee: Pérez Montero (Andalusia)

5 February 2012 22	Atlético Madrid	0–0	Valencia	Madrid
21:30	Miranda (yellow card) 32'; Falcao (yellow card) 60'	Report	Ruiz (yellow card) 16'; Albelda (yellow card) 45'; Alves (yellow card) 90'	Stadium: Vicente Calderón; Attendance: 41,000; Referee: Alberto Undiano Mallenco (Navarre)

11 February 2012 23	Racing Santander	0–0	Atlético Madrid	Santander
18:00	Diop (yellow card) 32'; Stuani (yellow card) 50'; Acosta (yellow card) 86'; Munitis (yellow card) 90+2'	Report	Filipe Luís (yellow card) 22'; Turan (yellow card) 23'; Tiago (yellow card) 39'; Gabi (yellow card) 62'	Stadium: El Sardinero; Attendance: 18,000; Referee: Javier Estrada Fernández (Catalonia)

19 February 2012 24	Sporting de Gijón	1–1	Atlético Madrid	Gijón
18:00	Eguren (yellow card) 17', (goal) 37'; Barral (yellow card) 41'; Colunga (yellow card) 59'; Castro (yellow card) 63'; Bilić (yellow card) 87'	Report	Canella 20' (o.g.); Gabi (yellow card) 30'; Suárez (yellow card) 89'	Stadium: El Molinón; Attendance: 23,000; Referee: Fernández Borbalán (Andalusia)

26 February 2012 25	Atlético Madrid	1–2	Barcelona	Madrid
21:30	Godín (yellow card) 23'; Juanfran (yellow card) 25'; Turan (yellow card) 30'; Falcao 49', (yellow card) 85'; Tiago (yellow card) 60'; Koke (yellow card) 74'	Report	Messi (yellow card) 8', (goal) 81'; Alves 36', (yellow card) 70'; Fàbregas (yellow card) 45'; Sánchez (yellow card) 76'; Busquets (yellow card) 90'	Stadium: Vicente Calderón; Attendance: 53,000; Referee: Pérez Lasa (Basque Country)

3 March 2012 26	Sevilla	1–1	Atlético Madrid	Seville
22:00 CET (UTC+01)	Medel (yellow card) 21'; Navarro (yellow card) 45+2'; Diawara 54'	Summary	Salvio 9', (yellow card) 44'; Filipe Luís (yellow card) 13'; Tiago (yellow card) 34'; Juanfran (yellow card) 53'; Domínguez (yellow card) 59'	Stadium: Estadio Ramón Sánchez Pizjuán; Attendance: 36,000; Referee: Alfonso Alvarez Izquierdo

11 March 2012 27	Atlético Madrid	2–0	Granada	Madrid
12:00 CET (UTC+01)	Miranda 38'; Koke (yellow card) 60'; Godín (yellow card) 73'; Falcao 90+1'	Summary	Nyom (yellow card) 53'; Gómez (yellow card) 63'; Henrique (red card) 83'	Stadium: Vicente Calderón; Attendance: 45,000; Referee: Antonio Miguel Mateu Lahoz

18 March 2012 28	Mallorca	2–1	Atlético Madrid	Palma
16:00 CET (UTC+01)	Godín 47' (o.g.); Pereira 49' (yellow card) 53'; Castro (yellow card) 52'; Ramis (red card) 53'; Aouate (yellow card) 69'; Martí (yellow card) 89'	Summary	Falcao 66'; Gabi (yellow card) 81'	Stadium: Iberostar Stadium; Attendance: 16,000; Referee: Javier Turienzo Álvarez

21 March 2012 29	Atlético Madrid	2–1	Athletic Bilbao	Madrid
20:00 CET (UTC+01)	Gabi (yellow card) 38'; Falcao 50', 72'; Juanfran (yellow card) 64'; Miranda (yellow card) 66'; Suárez (yellow card) 82'	Summary	Herrera (yellow card) 40'; San José (yellow card) 63'; Martínez (yellow card) 70', (goal) 90+2'	Stadium: Vicente Calderón; Attendance: 30,000; Referee: Javier Estrada Fernández (Catalonia)

25 March 2012 30	Zaragoza	1–0	Atlético Madrid	Zaragoza
12:00 CET (UTC+01)	Apoño 90+5'	Summary	Salvio (yellow card) 20'; Koke (yellow card) 61'; Diego (yellow card) 82'; Suárez (yellow card) 90'; Godín (yellow card) 90+4'	Stadium: La Romareda; Attendance: 24,000; Referee: Alberto Undiano Mallenco (Navarre)

1 April 2012 31	Atlético Madrid	3–0	Getafe	Madrid
12:00 CET (UTC+01)	Salvio 24'; Diego 62'; Falcao 77'; Koke (yellow card) 89'	Summary	Alexis (yellow card) 53'; Díaz (yellow card) 70'	Stadium: Vicente Calderón; Attendance: 49,000; Referee: José Luis Paradas Romero (Andalusia)

8 April 2012 32	Levante	2–0	Atlético Madrid	Valencia
12:00 CET (UTC+01)	Valdo 1', (yellow card) 86'; Koné 9', (yellow card) 41'; Ballesteros (yellow card) 34'; Juanfran (yellow card) 45'	Summary	Diego (yellow card) 34'; Turan (yellow card) 34'; Salvio (yellow card) 49'; Suárez (yellow card) 68'; Miranda (yellow card) 72' (yellow-red card) 83'; Gabi (yellow card) 90+4'	Stadium: Ciutat de València; Attendance: 12,000; Referee: Ignacio Iglesias (Galicia)

11 April 2012 33	Atlético Madrid	1–4	Real Madrid	Madrid
22:00 CET (UTC+01)	Falcao 55'; Filipe Luís (yellow card) 61'; Koke (yellow card) 90+2'	Summary	Ronaldo 25', 68', 83' (pen.); Arbeloa (yellow card) 35'; Alonso (yellow card) 58'; Di María (yellow card) 78'; Callejón 88'	Stadium: Vicente Calderón; Attendance: 53,000; Referee: Carlos Delgado Ferreiro (Basque Country)

15 April 2012 34	Rayo Vallecano	0–1	Atlético Madrid	Madrid
21:30 CET (UTC+01)	Movilla (yellow card) 34'; Bangoura (yellow card) 36'; Tamudo (yellow card) 42'; Rober (yellow card) 48'; Arribas (yellow card) 82'; Tito (yellow card) 90+3'	Summary	Miranda (yellow card) 46'; Falcao 65'; Adrián (yellow card) 80'	Stadium: Campo de Fútbol de Vallecas; Attendance: 10,000; Referee: Antonio Miguel Mateu Lahoz (Valencian Community)

22 April 2012 35	Atlético Madrid	3–1	Espanyol	Madrid
18:00 CET (UTC+01)	Godin 9', (yellow card) 48'; Gabi (yellow card) 16'; Turan 59', 61'; Falcao (yellow card) 75'	Summary	Vilà 19'; López (yellow card) 58'; Moreno (yellow card) 79'	Stadium: Vicente Calderón; Attendance: 45,000; Referee: Carlos Clos Gómez (Aragon)

29 April 2012 36	Real Betis	2–2	Atlético Madrid	Seville
19:45 CET (UTC+01)	Matilla (yellow card) 45'; Pereira (yellow card) 72', (goal) 88'; Iriney (yellow card) 81'; Pozuelo 86'; Amaya (yellow card) 90'	Summary	Tiago (yellow card) 26'; Salvio (yellow card) 41'; Koke 64'; Falcao 90+4'	Stadium: Estadio Benito Villamarín; Attendance: 25,000; Referee: José Antonio Teixeira Vitienes (Cantabria)

2 May 2012 20	Atlético Madrid	1–1	Real Sociedad	Madrid
18:00 CET (UTC+01)	Suárez (yellow card) 23'; Gabi 54' (yellow card) 58' (yellow-red card) 73'; Falcao (yellow card) 83'	Summary	Zurutuza (yellow card) 50'; Vela 90+1'	Stadium: Vicente Calderón; Attendance: 40,000; Referee: Ignacio Iglesias (Galicia)

5 May 2012 37	Atlético Madrid	2–1	Málaga	Madrid
21:00 CET (UTC+01)	Suárez (yellow card) 33'; Koke 69', (yellow card) 88'; Diego (yellow card) 73'; Tiago (yellow card) 77'; Adrián 79'; Turan (yellow card) 81'; Salvio (yellow card) 90'	Summary	Eliseu 38'; Weligton (yellow card) 78'; Sánchez (yellow card) 89'	Stadium: Vicente Calderón; Attendance: 25,000; Referee: César Muñiz Fernández (Asturias)

13 May 2012 38	Villarreal	0–1	Atlético Madrid	Villarreal
20:00 CET (UTC+01)		Report	Falcao 88'	Stadium: El Madrigal; Attendance: 16,000; Referee: Javier Estrada Fernández (Catalonia)

=== Copa del Rey ===
Kickoff times are in CET.

==== Round of 32 ====
8 December 2011 First leg	Albacete	2–1	Atlético Madrid	Albacete
20:00	Calle 30' (pen.); Núñez (red card) 50'; Rocha (yellow card) 56'; Zurdo 61'; Blázquez (yellow card) 77'	Report	Domínguez (yellow card) 29' (yellow-red card) 60'; Pizzi (yellow card) 36'; Adrián 70'	Stadium: Carlos Belmonte; Attendance: 13,000; Referee: Teixeira Vitienes (Cantabria)

21 December 2011 Second leg	Atlético Madrid	0–1 (1–3 agg.)	Albacete	Madrid
20:00	Miranda (yellow card) 57'; Filipe Luís (yellow card) 60'; Falcao (yellow card) 62'; Pizzi (yellow card) 79'; Assunção (yellow card) 87'	Report	Curto 1'; Rocha (yellow card) 24'; Zurdo (yellow card) 40'; Campos (yellow card) 56'; Calle (yellow card) 77'	Stadium: Vicente Calderón; Attendance: 15,000; Referee: Álvarez Izquierdo (Catalan)

=== UEFA Europa League ===
Kickoff times are in CET.

==== Third qualifying round ====
28 July 2011 First leg	Atlético Madrid (Spain)	2–1	(Norway) Strømsgodset	Madrid, Spain
21:00	Tiago (yellow card) 40'; Reyes 54', 74'; Miranda (red card) 76'	Report	Vilsvik (yellow card) 19'; Sankoh (yellow card) 50'; Storflor 80'	Stadium: Vicente Calderón; Attendance: 30,056; Referee: Danny Desmond Makkelie (Netherlands)

4 August 2011 Second leg	Strømsgodset (Norway)	0–2 (1–4 agg.)	(Spain) Atlético Madrid	Drammen, Norway
18:30	Nordkvelle (yellow card) 76'	Report	Adrián 13'; Salvio (yellow card) 23'; Gabi (yellow card) 53'; Assunção (yellow card) 56'; Domínguez (yellow card) 69'; Reyes 90+3'	Stadium: Marienlyst Stadion; Attendance: 6,807; Referee: Mark Courtney (Northern Ireland)

==== Play-off round ====
18 August 2011 First leg	Atlético Madrid (Spain)	2–0	(Portugal) Vitória de Guimarães	Madrid, Spain
22:00	Domínguez (yellow card) 54'; Elias 68', 73'	Report	Olímpio (yellow card) 37'; Paulo Sérgio (yellow card) 54'; João Paulo (red card) 64'	Stadium: Vicente Calderón; Attendance: 27,153; Referee: Clément Turpin (France)

25 August 2011 Second leg	Vitória de Guimarães (Portugal)	0–4 (0–6 agg.)	(Spain) Atlético Madrid	Guimarães, Portugal
20:30	Nilson (yellow card) 2'; Issam (yellow card) 25'; Edgar (yellow card) 57'	Report	Gabi 2' (pen.); Adrián 18', 60'; Salvio (yellow card) 30', (goal) 81'; Sílvio (yellow card) 36'	Stadium: Afonso Henriques; Attendance: 10,330; Referee: Andre Marriner (England)

==== Group stage ====
Pos	Team	Pld	W	D	L	GF	GA	GD	Pts	Qualification
1	(Spain) Atlético Madrid	6	4	1	1	11	4	+7	13	Advance to knockout phase
2	(Italy) Udinese	6	2	3	1	6	7	−1	9	Advance to knockout phase
3	(Scotland) Celtic	6	1	3	2	6	7	−1	6	
4	(France) Rennes	6	0	3	3	5	10	−5	3	

Source: Soccerway

15 September 2011 1	Atlético Madrid (Spain)	2–0	(Scotland) Celtic	Madrid, Spain
21:05	Falcao 3'; Gabi (yellow card) 51'; Suárez (yellow card) 59'; Diego 69'	Report	Kayal (yellow card) 74'; Loovens (yellow card) 86'	Stadium: Vicente Calderón; Attendance: 24,868; Referee: Peter Rasmussen (Denmark)

29 September 2011 2	Rennes (France)	1–1	(Spain) Atlético Madrid	Rennes, France
19:00	Danzé (yellow card) 35'; Montaño 56'; Pitroipa (yellow card) 64'	Report	Turan (yellow card) 27'; Perea (yellow card) 35'; Juanfran 87'	Stadium: Route de Lorient; Attendance: 24,298; Referee: Hüseyin Göçek (Turkey)

20 October 2011 3	Udinese (Italy)	2–0	(Spain) Atlético Madrid	Udine, Italy
19:00	Badu (yellow card) 59'; Danilo (yellow card) 62'; Benatia 88'; Floro Flores 90+4'	Report	Gabi (yellow card) 73'; Assunção (yellow card) 83'	Stadium: Stadio Friuli; Attendance: 10,026; Referee: Alon Yefet (Israel)

3 November 2011 4	Atlético Madrid (Spain)	4–0	(Italy) Udinese	Madrid, Spain
21:05	Adrián 7', 12'; Diego 37'; Suárez (yellow card) 52'; Falcao 67'	Report		Stadium: Vicente Calderón; Attendance: 18,300; Referee: István Vad (Hungary)

30 November 2011 5	Celtic (Scotland)	0–1	(Spain) Atlético Madrid	Glasgow, Scotland
19:00	Majstorović (yellow card) 54'; Ki (yellow card) 58'	Report	Turan 30'; Gabi (yellow card) 60'; Miranda (yellow card) 66'; Perea (yellow card) 71'	Stadium: Celtic Park; Attendance: 33,257; Referee: Eric Braamhaar (Netherlands)

15 December 2011 6	Atlético Madrid (Spain)	3–1	(France) Rennes	Madrid, Spain
21:05	Assunção (yellow card) 14'; Falcao 38' (pen.); Domínguez 42'; Turan 79'	Report	Apam (yellow card) 24'; Mandjeck 86'	Stadium: Vicente Calderón; Attendance: 10,000; Referee: Kristinn Jakobsson (Iceland)

==== Knockout phase ====
===== Round of 32 =====
16 February 2012 First leg	Lazio (Italy)	1–3	(Spain) Atlético Madrid	Rome, Italy
19:00	Klose 19'	Report	Adrián 25'; Suárez (yellow card) 26'; Falcao 37', 63'; Juanfran (yellow card) 51'	Stadium: Stadio Olimpico; Attendance: 33,000; Referee: Pavel Královec (Czech Republic)

23 February 2012 Second leg	Atlético Madrid (Spain)	1–0 (4–1 agg.)	(Italy) Lazio	Madrid, Spain
21:05	Godín (yellow card) 42', (goal) 48'; Assunção (yellow card) 86'	Report	Diakité (yellow card) 62'; Matuzalém (yellow card) 65'	Stadium: Vicente Calderón; Attendance: 30,000; Referee: Martin Atkinson (England)

===== Round of 16 =====
8 March 2012 First leg	Atlético Madrid (Spain)	3–1	(Turkey) Beşiktaş	Madrid, Spain
19:00	Salvio 24', 27'; Adrián 37'	Report	Simão 53'; Ernst (yellow card) 74'; Köybaşı (yellow card) 78'	Stadium: Vicente Calderón; Attendance: 40,000; Referee: Jonas Eriksson (Sweden)

15 March 2012 Second leg	Beşiktaş (Turkey)	0–3 (1–6 agg.)	(Spain) Atlético Madrid	Istanbul, Turkey
19:00			Adrián 26'; Falcao 83'; Salvio 90+4'	Stadium: BJK İnönü Stadium; Attendance: 23,000; Referee: Paolo Tagliavento (Italy)

===== Quarter-finals =====
29 March 2012 First leg	Atlético Madrid (Spain)	2–1	(Germany) Hannover 96	Madrid, Spain
21:05	Falcao 9'; Salvio 89'	Report	Diouf 38'	Stadium: Vicente Calderón Stadium; Attendance: 35,000; Referee: Stéphane Lannoy (France)

5 April 2012 Second leg	Hannover 96 (Germany)	1–2 (2–4 agg.)	(Spain) Atlético Madrid	Hanover, Germany
21:05	Diouf 81'	Report	Adrián 63'; Falcao 87'	Stadium: AWD-Arena; Attendance: 44,000; Referee: Mark Clattenburg (England)

===== Semi-finals =====
19 April 2012 First leg	Atlético Madrid (Spain)	4–2	(Spain) Valencia	Madrid, Spain
21:05	Falcao 18', 78'; Miranda 49'; Adrián 54'	Report	Jonas 45+3'; Costa 90+4'	Stadium: Vicente Calderón Stadium; Attendance: 49,400; Referee: Craig Thomson (Scotland)

26 April 2012 Second leg	Valencia (Spain)	0–1 (2–5 agg.)	(Spain) Atlético Madrid	Valencia, Spain
21:05		Report	Adrián 60'	Stadium: Mestalla Stadium; Attendance: 35,000; Referee: Damir Skomina (Slovenia)

===== Final =====
9 May 2012 Final	Atlético Madrid (Spain)	3–0	(Spain) Athletic Bilbao	Bucharest, Romania
20:45	Falcao 7', 34', (yellow card) 26'; Diego 85'	Report	Herrera (yellow card) 22'; Amorebieta (yellow card) 64'; Pérez (yellow card) 75'; Susaeta (yellow card) 90+1'	Stadium: Arena Națională; Attendance: 52,347; Referee: Wolfgang Stark (Germany)

== See also ==
- 2011–12 Copa del Rey
- 2011–12 La Liga
- 2011–12 UEFA Europa League
