= Álvaro Domínguez (footballer, born 1989) =

Spanish footballer

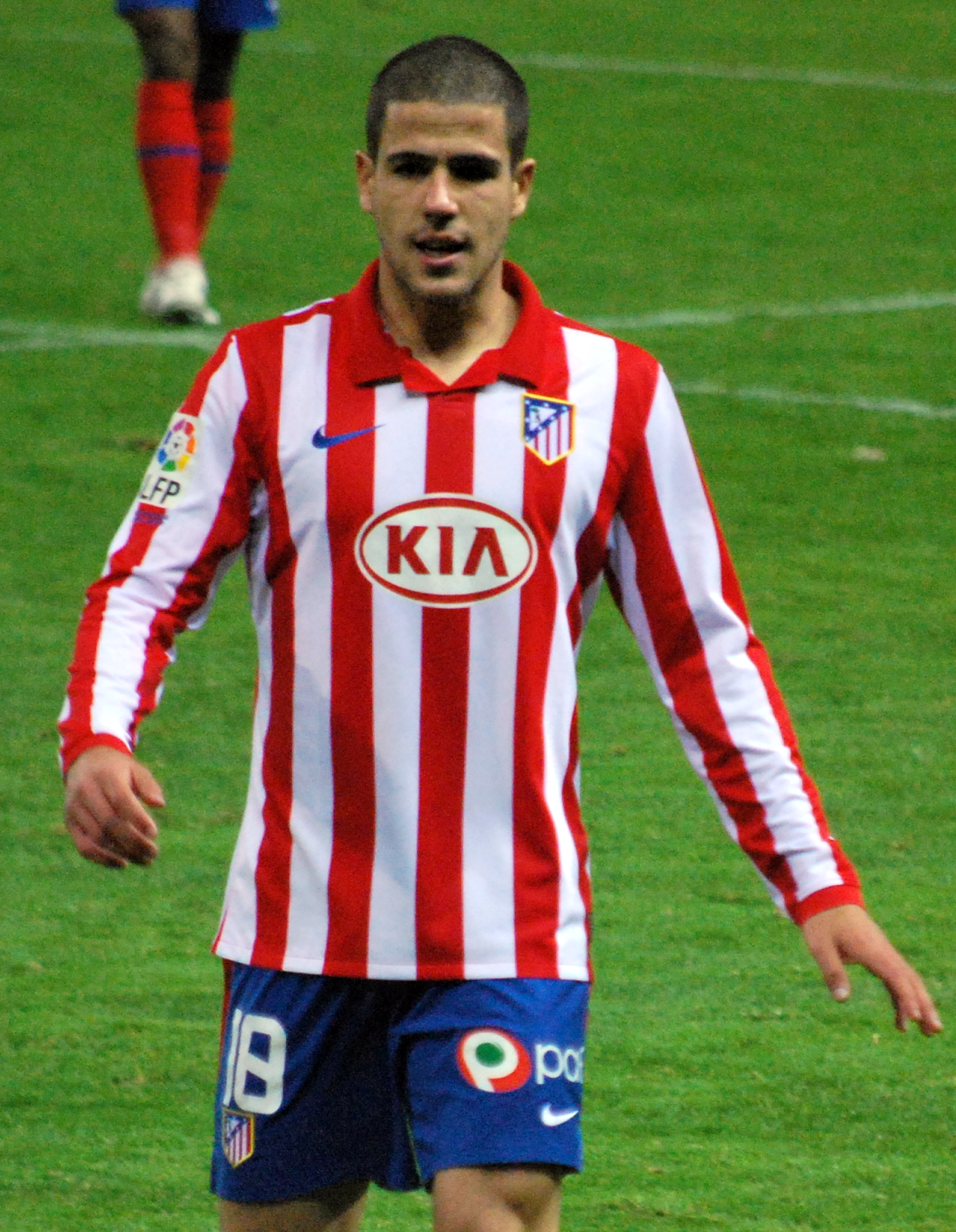
- Domínguez playing for Atlético Madrid in 2009

Personal information
- Full name: Álvaro Domínguez Soto
- Date of birth: 16 May 1989 (age 37)
- Place of birth: Madrid, Spain
- Height: 1.89 m (6 ft 2 in)
- Position: Defender

Youth career
- 1999–2001: Real Madrid
- 2001–2007: Atlético Madrid

Senior career*
| Years | Team | Apps | (Gls) |
| 2007–2009 | Atlético Madrid B | 44 | (0) |
| 2008–2012 | Atlético Madrid | 76 | (5) |
| 2012–2016 | Borussia Mönchengladbach | 81 | (3) |
| Total | | 201 | (8) |

International career
| 2007–2008 | Spain U19 | 7 | (0) |
| 2009 | Spain U20 | 1 | (0) |
| 2008–2011 | Spain U21 | 13 | (1) |
| 2012 | Spain U23 | 5 | (0) |
| 2012 | Spain | 2 | (0) |
Medal record
Representing Spain
Men's football
UEFA European Under-21 Championship
| Winner | 2011 Denmark |
- * Club domestic league appearances and goals

Álvaro Domínguez Soto (Spanish pronunciation: [ˈalβaɾo ðoˈmiŋɡeθ ˈsoto]; born 16 May 1989) is a Spanish former professional footballer who played as a centre back and left back during the course of his career.

He began playing professional football in 2008 when he made his debut with Atlético Madrid. Domínguez went on to play in 120 competitive games and won three major titles with the club, including two Europa League trophies. In 2012, he signed for Bundesliga club Borussia Mönchengladbach, where he made just over 100 appearances. His time in Germany was hampered by injuries, however, which ultimately forced him to retire in 2016, at the age of 27.

Prior to his retirement, Domínguez had represented Spain at various youth levels and was part of the team which was triumphant at the 2011 UEFA European Under-21 Championship. The following year he was included in the squad which took part in the 2012 Olympics in the United Kingdom and also made his debut for the senior national team.

== Club career ==
=== Atlético Madrid ===
Having been released from the academy of Real Madrid as a youngster, Domínguez was signed by local rivals Atlético Madrid when he was 12 years old. In the coming years he progressed through the various youth levels at Atlético before being handed his senior debut by manager Javier Aguirre on 22 October 2008, starting in place of the injured Tomáš Ujfaluši in a 1–1 Champions League draw with Premier League team Liverpool. Four days later, he made his La Liga debut in a 4–4 draw with Villarreal at the Estadio de la Cerámica. Domínguez managed five senior appearances for the campaign but spent the majority of his first professional season with the Atlético Madrid B team in Segunda División B.

The following year, following the appointment of Quique Sánchez Flores as new club manager, Domínguez became a mainstay in the Atlético Madrid team at left back where he displaced captain Antonio López from the starting XI. López later returned to the starting line-up when Sánchez Flores opted to convert Domínguez to the centre-back position. It was also the season in which Domínguez signed his first professional contract with los Colchoneros, penning a four-year deal until June 2013. He ultimately made 46 appearances for the season across all competitions and was part of the squads which ended as runners-up in the Copa del Rey and as champions in the UEFA Europa League, where he started in a 2–1 win over Fulham.

Domínguez continued to be a fixture in the Atlético Madrid first-team the following season and in August 2010 he started and played the full 90 minutes in the team's UEFA Super Cup win over Inter Milan. He then scored his first senior goal for the club on 19 December, netting the team's second in a 3–0 La Liga win over Málaga. He scored once more for Atlético Madrid as he ended the season with 28 appearances to his name across all competitions. In the 2011–12 campaign, Domínguez was named as the third-captain for the season, behind López and vice-captain Luis Perea. On 10 September, he made his 50th league appearance for Atlético Madrid when he started in a 1–0 loss against Valencia at the Mestalla. Domínguez ultimately featured in 41 matches as the club ended the season in fifth in the league, thereby missing out on a Champions League spot. He enjoyed success in the Europa League, however, coming on as a late substitute for Arda Turan as Atlético Madrid beat fellow Spaniards Athletic Bilbao 3–0 in the final to reclaim their title.

It would be his final match for the Red and Whites, though, as at the end of the season he agreed to sign for Bundesliga club Borussia Mönchengladbach. He made 120 appearances for Atlético Madrid over the course of a four-year span, scoring six goals and earning three winners' medals. Domínguez later revealed that the club's lack of trust in academy players had contributed to his decision to sign for Gladbach.

=== Borussia Mönchengladbach ===
On 27 June 2012, Bundesliga club Borussia Mönchengladbach completed the signing of Domínguez on a five-year contract for a fee of €8 million, bringing him in to replace the outgoing Dante. He made his league debut for the club on 1 September, starting in a 0–0 draw with Fortuna Düsseldorf. Three games later, Domínguez scored his first goal for the club, netting an extra-time equalizer in 2–2 draw against Hamburg. He ultimately made 40 appearances and scored two goals across all competitions for the season as Gladbach finished eighth in the Bundesliga.

During Gladbach's opening match of the 2013–14 season against Bayern Munich, Domínguez conceded a penalty when he handled the ball in the box. Thomas Müller's resultant penalty was saved by goalkeeper Marc-André ter Stegen but Domínguez handled again from the rebound, giving away a second penalty which was duly converted by David Alaba. Gladbach ultimately lost the match 3–1. It was an injury-disrupted season for Domínguez, though, as early in October he suffered a broken collarbone and dislocated shoulder. He managed just 22 appearances for the campaign, and 34 in the next before a spate of back injuries severely curtailed his playing time in the seasons that followed.

Having struggled throughout 2015 with back problems, playing through the pain and medicating before matches, Dominguez sought the advice Dr. Miiller-Wohlfahrt in Munich in August. The doctor was astounded that Dominguez was still playing football as X-rays and MRI scans revealed that he had three herniated disks and further complications in his spinal canal. The full extent of Domínguez's back problems, which saw him undergo two operations, was such that during his time with Gladbach he missed 88 of the 194 games the team played while he was at the club.

On 6 December 2016, after having not played a match in more than a year, Domínguez announced his retirement from all football at the age of 27 as a result of the chronic back problems he suffered from. He revealed that he had been living with a back condition for the past few years and that, despite having twice undergone surgery in an attempt to rectify the problem, had been obliged to play by Gladbach. Domínguez later admitted to Spanish news publication Marca that he was considering taking legal action against Gladbach for medical negligence, claiming that the club had failed to treat his condition appropriately. He later revealed that he would not be taking legal steps, stating that he "wants peace, not war."

== International career ==
=== Youth ===
Domínguez represented Spain at various youth levels and in 2009 was called up to the Spain under-20 team for the FIFA U-20 World Cup. He was then named in Luis Milla's under-21 squad for the 2011 UEFA European Championship. He started in all of Spain's matches, partnering Sporting de Gijón's Alberto Botía in central defense, as the national team won the tournament in Denmark. The following year, Domínguez was included in the Spain squad for the 2012 Olympics alongside Atlético Madrid teammates Adrián López and Koke. Spain were eliminated early on however, after defeats to Japan and Honduras saw them knocked out of the tournament.

=== Senior ===
On 25 August 2011, following the UEFA European Under-21 Championship, Domínguez was called up to the senior national team by coach Vicente del Bosque for matches against Chile and Liechtenstein. Domínguez failed to feature in either match but made his debut on 26 May the following year, playing 45 minutes in a 2–0 friendly win over Serbia ahead of the 2012 European Championship. He featured again four days later in Spain's 4–1 win over South Korea but ultimately missed out on a place in the final tournament squad.

== Post-playing career ==
In 2018, Domínguez worked in collaboration with the Spanish footballers' Association to publish a manual which aimed to help footballers better deal with their finances. In an interview with Marca, he revealed that he had once spent €15,000 in one night and that young players were not educated on how to manage their money.

== Personal life ==
Domínguez attended King's College in his native Madrid until he was 18-years old. As a result of the school's British curriculum, Domínguez learned to speak English fluently. Though an Atlético Madrid supporter from birth, Domínguez revealed in a 2010 interview with The Guardian that he is fan of Premier League team Chelsea, and that the club's captain John Terry was his idol.

== Career statistics ==
=== Club ===
Appearances and goals by club, season and competition
| Club | Season | League | | | National cup (Note: Appearances in Copa del Rey and DFB-Pokal) | | Europe | | Total | |
| Club | Season | Division | Apps | Goals | Apps | Goals | Apps | Goals | Apps | Goals |
|---|---|---|---|---|---|---|---|---|---|---|
| Atlético Madrid B | 2007–08 | Segunda División B | 21 | 0 | — | | — | | 21 | 0 |
| Atlético Madrid B | 2008–09 | Segunda División B | 23 | 0 | — | | — | | 23 | 0 |
| Atlético Madrid B | Total | | 44 | 0 | — | | — | | 44 | 0 |
| Atlético Madrid | 2007–08 | La Liga | 0 | 0 | 0 | 0 | 0 | 0 | 0 | 0 |
| Atlético Madrid | 2008–09 | La Liga | 3 | 0 | 1 | 0 | 1 (Note: Appearance(s) in UEFA Champions League) | 0 | 5 | 0 |
| Atlético Madrid | 2009–10 | La Liga | 26 | 0 | 8 | 0 | 12 (Note: Four appearances in UEFA Champions League, eight in UEFA Europa League) | 0 | 46 | 0 |
| Atlético Madrid | 2010–11 | La Liga | 19 | 2 | 3 | 0 | 6 (Note: One appearance in UEFA Super Cup, five in UEFA Europa League) | 0 | 28 | 2 |
| Atlético Madrid | 2011–12 | La Liga | 28 | 3 | 1 | 0 | 12 (Note: Appearances in UEFA Europa League) | 1 | 41 | 4 |
| Atlético Madrid | Total | | 76 | 5 | 13 | 0 | 31 | 1 | 120 | 6 |
| Borussia Mönchengladbach | 2012–13 | Bundesliga | 30 | 2 | 2 | 0 | 8 (Note: One appearance in UEFA Champions League, seven in UEFA Europa League) | 0 | 40 | 2 |
| Borussia Mönchengladbach | 2013–14 | Bundesliga | 21 | 1 | 1 | 0 | — | | 22 | 1 |
| Borussia Mönchengladbach | 2014–15 | Bundesliga | 24 | 0 | 2 | 0 | 8 | 0 | 34 | 0 |
| Borussia Mönchengladbach | 2015–16 | Bundesliga | 6 | 0 | 1 | 0 | 3 | 0 | 10 | 0 |
| Borussia Mönchengladbach | 2016–17 | Bundesliga | 0 | 0 | 0 | 0 | 0 | 0 | 0 | 0 |
| Borussia Mönchengladbach | Total | | 81 | 3 | 6 | 0 | 19 | 0 | 106 | 3 |
| Career total | | | 201 | 8 | 19 | 0 | 50 | 1 | 270 | 9 |

=== International ===
Appearances and goals by national team and year
| National team | Year | Apps | Goals |
|---|---|---|---|
| Spain | 2012 | 2 | 0 |
| Total | | 2 | 0 |

== Honours ==
Atlético Madrid

- UEFA Europa League: 2009–10, 2011–12
- UEFA Super Cup: 2010

Spain U21

- UEFA European Under-21 Championship: 2011
