= Pedro Martín =

Spanish footballer (born 1992)

Personal information
- Full name: Pedro José Martín Moreno
- Date of birth: 16 January 1992 (age 34)
- Place of birth: Málaga, Spain
- Height: 1.89 m (6 ft 2 in)
- Position: Forward

Youth career
- 2006–2008: Málaga
- 2008–2010: Atlético Madrid

Senior career*
Years	Team	Apps	(Gls)
2010–2011	Atlético Madrid C	36	(9)
2011–2013	Atlético Madrid B	49	(16)
2012–2014	Atlético Madrid	1	(0)
2013–2014	→ Numancia (loan)	41	(3)
2014–2015	Mirandés	36	(9)
2015–2016	Tenerife	13	(1)
2016–2017	Celta B	12	(3)
2016–2017	→ Mirandés (loan)	37	(3)
2017–2018	Murcia	29	(5)
2018–2019	Lleida Esportiu	34	(16)
2019–2022	Gimnàstic	60	(10)
2022	→ Sanluqueño (loan)	14	(2)
2022–2023	Odisha	20	(3)
2023–2024	Schaffhausen	3	(0)
2024	→ Brühl (loan)	11	(3)
2024	Lincoln Red Imps	0	(0)
2024–2025	Reus	13	(1)
Total		409	(84)
- * Club domestic league appearances and goals

Pedro José Martín Moreno (born 16 January 1992) is a Spanish former professional footballer who played as a forward.

== Club career ==
=== Atlético Madrid ===
Born in Málaga, Andalusia, Martín started playing football with his hometown club, joining Atlético Madrid in 2008 at the age of 16. After two years in the youth academy he made his senior debut with the C team in the Tercera División and, after a good first year, he was called by first-team manager Gregorio Manzano for the 2011–12 pre-season, going on to score six goals. He was an unused substitute in both UEFA Europa League games against Strømsgodset, but eventually spent most of the campaign with the reserves in the Segunda División B.

Martín made his debut with the Colchoneros' first team on 8 December 2011, replacing Pizzi midway through the second half of a 2–1 Copa del Rey defeat at Albacete (3–1 on aggregate). On 21 March of the following year, also at the Estadio Carlos Belmonte but with Atlético B, he scored in the last minute for a 2–1 win.

New coach Diego Simeone called Martín for various matches later in the season, as he continued to appear and score with the reserves. His first appearance in La Liga came on 29 April 2012, coming on for Tiago in the last minute of a 2–2 away draw against Real Betis. On 9 May, he received a Europa League winner's medal following Atlético's victory over Athletic Bilbao, but did not leave the bench.

=== Journeyman ===
On 29 January 2013, Martín was loaned to Segunda División side Numancia until the end of the season, and the move was extended for a further year on 12 July. On 26 August of the following year, he signed with Mirandés of the same league.

On 30 June 2015, Martín moved to Tenerife still in the second tier. On 1 February 2016, he joined Celta, being assigned to the B team who competed in the third division.

Martín returned to Mirandés on 17 August 2016, now in a one-year loan deal. He continued to play in the lower leagues after being released, with Real Murcia CF, Lleida Esportiu, Gimnàstic and Sanluqueño.

=== Odisha ===
Martín moved abroad for the first time in July 2022, signing a one-year contract with Indian Super League club Odisha. He made his debut on 17 August, in a 6–0 away rout of NorthEast United in the group stage of the Durand Cup. He scored his first goal on 4 September, the only a win over Army Green in the same competition after an assist from Michael Soosairaj.

=== Later career ===
On 18 June 2023, Martín joined Schaffhausen in the Swiss Challenge League. In February 2024, he was loaned to Brühl in the country's Promotion League.

== Career statistics ==
As of 25 April 2023

Club	Season	League			Cup		Continental		Other		Total	
Club	Season	Division	Apps	Goals	Apps	Goals	Apps	Goals	Apps	Goals	Apps	Goals
Atlético Madrid	2011–12	La Liga	1	0	1 (Note: Appearances in Copa del Rey)	0	—		—		2	0
Atlético Madrid	2012–13	La Liga	0	0	0	0	3 (Note: Appearances in UEFA Europa League)	0	—		3	0
Atlético Madrid	Total		1	0	1	0	3	0	—		5	0
Atlético Madrid B	2011–12	Segunda División B	30	13	—		—		—		30	13
Atlético Madrid B	2012–13	Segunda División B	19	3	—		—		—		19	3
Atlético Madrid B	Total		49	16	—		—		—		49	16
Numancia (loan)	2012–13	Segunda División	19	3	0	0	—		—		19	3
Numancia (loan)	2013–14	Segunda División	22	0	0	0	—		—		22	0
Numancia (loan)	Total		41	3	0	0	—		—		41	3
Mirandés	2014–15	Segunda División	36	9	2	0	—		—		38	9
Tenerife	2015–16	Segunda División	13	1	1	0	—		—		14	1
Celta B	2015–16	Segunda División B	12	3	—		—		—		12	3
Mirandés (loan)	2016–17	Segunda División	37	3	0	0	—		—		37	3
Murcia	2017–18	Segunda División B	29	5	2	2	—		2 (Note: Appearances in Segunda División B play-offs)	0	33	7
Lleida Esportiu	2018–19	Segunda División B	34	16	3	0	—		1 (Note: Appearance in Copa Catalunya)	0	38	16
Gimnàstic	2019–20	Segunda División B	23	5	2	0	—		1	0	26	5
Gimnàstic	2020–21	Segunda División B	22	5	—		—		2 (Note: Appearances in Copa Federación)	0	24	5
Gimnàstic	2021–22	Primera División RFEF	15	0	1	0	—		—		16	0
Gimnàstic	Total		60	10	3	0	—		3	0	66	10
Sanluqueño (loan)	2021–22	Primera División RFEF	14	2	—		—		—		14	2
Odisha	2022–23	Indian Super League	20	3	1 (Note: Appearance in Super Cup)	0	—		5 (Note: Appearances in Durand Cup)	1	26	4
Career total			346	71	13	2	3	0	11	1	373	74

== Honours ==
Atlético Madrid

- UEFA Europa League: 2011–12
