= Elias (footballer, born 1985) =

Brazilian footballer

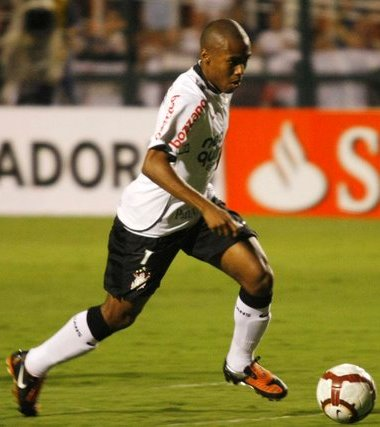
- Elias playing for Corinthians in 2010

Personal information
- Full name: Elias Mendes Trindade
- Date of birth: 16 May 1985 (age 41)
- Place of birth: São Paulo, Brazil
- Height: 1.73 m (5 ft 8 in)
- Position: Central midfielder

Youth career
- 1997–2005: Palmeiras

Senior career*
Years	Team	Apps	(Gls)
2005	Palmeiras B	0	(0)
2006	Náutico	2	(0)
2007	São Bento	13	(4)
2007	Juventus-SP	6	(0)
2008	Ponte Preta	20	(5)
2008–2010	Corinthians	130	(20)
2011	Atlético Madrid	15	(2)
2011–2014	Sporting CP	34	(2)
2013	→ Flamengo (loan)	42	(5)
2014–2016	Corinthians	71	(9)
2016–2017	Sporting CP	8	(1)
2017–2019	Atlético Mineiro	122	(19)
2020	Bahia	16	(0)

International career
2010–2016	Brazil	35	(0)
- * Club domestic league appearances and goals

Elias Mendes Trindade (born 16 May 1985), known simply as Elias, is a Brazilian former professional footballer who played as a central midfielder.

== Club career ==
=== Early career ===
Born in São Paulo, Elias was a Palmeiras youth graduate, and played as a forward at the club. In December 2005, after a short stint at Verdão's B-team, he signed for Náutico.

Elias made his debut for Timbu on 15 January 2006, starting in a 1–0 Campeonato Pernambucano away loss against Serrano. On 20 January, after just one further match, he was released.

Elias spent the rest of the 2006 season playing for amateur sides Leões da Geolândia and Estrela Vermelha, and subsequently joined São Bento for the 2007 season, where he moved back to a midfielder role and impressed for the club. In that year he also represented Juventus-SP, scoring one of the goals in the club's 2–3 loss against Linense in the second leg of the Copa Paulista Finals, which his side won after a 4–4 aggregate result.

On 4 December 2007, Elias agreed to a contract with Ponte Preta in the Série B. He made his debut for the club the following 16 January by starting and scoring his team's third in a 4–2 home win against Ituano, and was a regular starter in the 2008 Campeonato Paulista which his side reached the Finals.

=== Corinthians ===
On 8 May 2008, Elias signed a contract with fellow second division side Corinthians until December 2011. An immediate starter, he helped the club return to Série A in his first season, and was a key unit in the club's 2009 Campeonato Paulista winning campaign.

Elias made his top tier debut on 6 August 2009, starting in a 1–0 loss at his former club Náutico. He scored his first goal in the category on 27 August, netting his team's second in a 2–2 away draw against Grêmio Barueri.

=== Atlético Madrid ===
On 5 December 2010, Elias confirmed that he would leave Corinthians and join Spanish team Atlético Madrid in January 2011, for a rumoured fee of €7 million. The club confirmed the transfer on 16 December, and made his debut abroad on 17 January, starting in a 3–0 home win against RCD Mallorca.

Elias scored his first goal abroad on 2 March 2011, netting the equalizer in a 1–1 draw at Getafe CF.

=== Sporting CP ===
On 29 August 2011, after being deemed surplus to requirements at Atleti, Elias moved to Sporting CP on a five-year contract. The club paid a fee of €8.85 million, making this the highest paid transfer in SCP history at the time. On 15 September, Sporting sold 50% economic rights of Elias for €3.85 million to Quality Sports Investments.

On his debut, on 10 September 2011, Elias scored a goal against F.C. Paços de Ferreira, on a win (2–3) of Sporting. At the 76th minute, Sporting was losing by 2–0, but with the goals by Marat Izmailov, Elias and Ricky van Wolfswinkel, Sporting won and began a series of victories in the league, earning him the nickname of "The Prophet" amidst Sporting fans. He scored again on 18 December, in a 1–1 draw against Académica, being subsequently sent off in that match.

==== Flamengo (loan) ====
On 10 January 2013, Elias joined Brazilian side Flamengo on loan for the season. He made his debut on 27 January by replacing Renato Abreu in a 1–0 home win against Volta Redonda, and scored his first goal on 14 March in a 3–2 home loss against Resende.

Elias was a regular starter during his loan spell, with Flamengo attempting to keep the midfielder for the 2014 campaign, but the move did not materialize.

=== Return to Corinthians ===
On 7 April 2014, and after two months of negotiations, Elias returned to Corinthians, who paid €4 million for 50% of his economic rights. He was presented on 10 April, and signed a contract until December 2017.

A regular starter upon arriving, Elias subsequently lost his undisputed status but still appeared regularly.

=== Sporting CP return ===
On 31 August 2016, Elias returned to Portugal and Sporting, signing a two-year contract, with a buyout clause of €60 million. However, he was sparingly used by the Lions, scoring twice in 13 appearances overall.

=== Atlético Mineiro ===
On 27 January 2017, Atlético Mineiro announced the signing of Elias. He featured regularly for the side during his spell, but was released on 7 January 2020, one month earlier than the expiry of his contract.

== International career ==
On 23 September 2010, Elias was first called up to the Brazil national team by coach Mano Menezes. He made his full international debut on 7 October, replacing Philippe Coutinho in a 3–0 win over Iran.

Elias was also included in Mano's 23-man list for the 2011 Copa América, while also featuring in Dunga's list for the 2015 Copa América and in the Copa América Centenario.

== Career statistics ==
=== Club ===
As of 1 September 2020

Appearances and goals by club, season and competition
Club	Season	League			State League		National cup		League cup		Continental		Other		Total	
Club	Season	Division	Apps	Goals	Apps	Goals	Apps	Goals	Apps	Goals	Apps	Goals	Apps	Goals	Apps	Goals
Palmeiras B	2005	Paulista A3	—		0	0	—		—		—		8 (Note: Appearance(s) in Copa Paulista)	0	8	0
Capibaribe	2006	Série B	0	0	2	0	0	0	—		—		—		2	0
São Bento	2007	Paulista	—		13	4	—		—		—		—		13	4
Juventus-SP	2007	Série C	6	0	—		—		—		—		18	3	24	3
Ponte Preta	2008	Série B	0	0	20	5	—		—		—		—		20	5
Corinthians	2008	Série B	30	3	—		1	0	—		—		—		31	3
Corinthians	2009	Série A	31	3	21	4	7	0	—		—		—		59	7
Corinthians	2010	Série A	33	7	15	3	—		—		8 (Note: Appearance(s) in Copa Libertadores)	3	—		56	13
Corinthians	Total		94	13	36	7	8	0	0	0	8	3	0	0	146	23
Atlético Madrid	2010–11	La Liga	15	2	—		1	0	—		—		—		16	2
Atlético Madrid	2011–12	La Liga	0	0	—		0	0	—		2 (Note: Appearance(s) in UEFA Europa League)	2	—		2	2
Atlético Madrid	Total		15	2	0	0	1	0	0	0	2	2	0	0	18	4
Sporting CP	2011–12	Primeira Liga	25	2	—		5	1	3	0	—		—		33	3
Sporting CP	2012–13	Primeira Liga	9	0	—		0	0	1	0	5	1	—		15	1
Sporting CP	Total		34	2	0	0	5	1	4	0	5	1	0	0	48	4
Flamengo (loan)	2013	Série A	30	4	12	1	13	5	—		—		—		55	10
Corinthians	2014	Série A	24	3	—		5	1	—		—		—		29	4
Corinthians	2015	Série A	24	5	7	0	1	0	—		10	4	—		42	9
Corinthians	2016	Série A	10	1	6	0	—		—		5	2	—		21	3
Corinthians	Total		58	9	13	0	6	1	0	0	15	6	0	0	92	16
Sporting CP	2016–17	Primeira Liga	8	1	—		2	0	3	1	2 (Note: Appearance(s) in UEFA Champions League)	0	—		15	2
Atlético Mineiro	2017	Série A	31	4	12	3	4	1	—		8	2	3 (Note: Appearance(s) in Primeira Liga)	1	58	11
Atlético Mineiro	2018	Série A	33	5	13	3	5	0	—		2 (Note: Appearance(s) in Copa Sudamericana)	0	—		53	8
Atlético Mineiro	2019	Série A	25	1	8	3	4	0	—		16 (Note: Nine appearances in Copa Sudamericana, seven appearances and two goals in Copa Sudamericana)	2	—		53	6
Atlético Mineiro	Total		89	10	33	9	13	1	0	0	26	4	3	1	164	25
Career total			334	41	129	26	48	8	7	1	58	16	29	4	605	96

=== International ===
Appearances and goals by national team and year
National team	Year	Apps	Goals
Brazil	2010	3	0
Brazil	2011	9	0
Brazil	2012	1	0
Brazil	2014	4	0
Brazil	2015	14	0
Brazil	2016	4	0
Total		35	0

== Honours ==
Juventus

- Copa Paulista: 2007

Corinthians

- Campeonato Brasileiro Série B: 2008
- Campeonato Paulista: 2009
- Copa do Brasil: 2009
- Campeonato Brasileiro Série A: 2015

Flamengo

- Copa do Brasil: 2013

Atlético Mineiro

- Campeonato Mineiro: 2017

Brazil

- Superclásico de las Américas: 2014

Individual

- Bola de Prata: 2010, 2013, 2015
- Campeonato Brasileiro Série A Team of the Year: 2010, 2013, 2015
- Best Central Midfielder in Brazil: 2015
- Copa Sudamericana Team of the Tournament: 2019
