= Mario Suárez (footballer) =

Spanish footballer (born 1987)

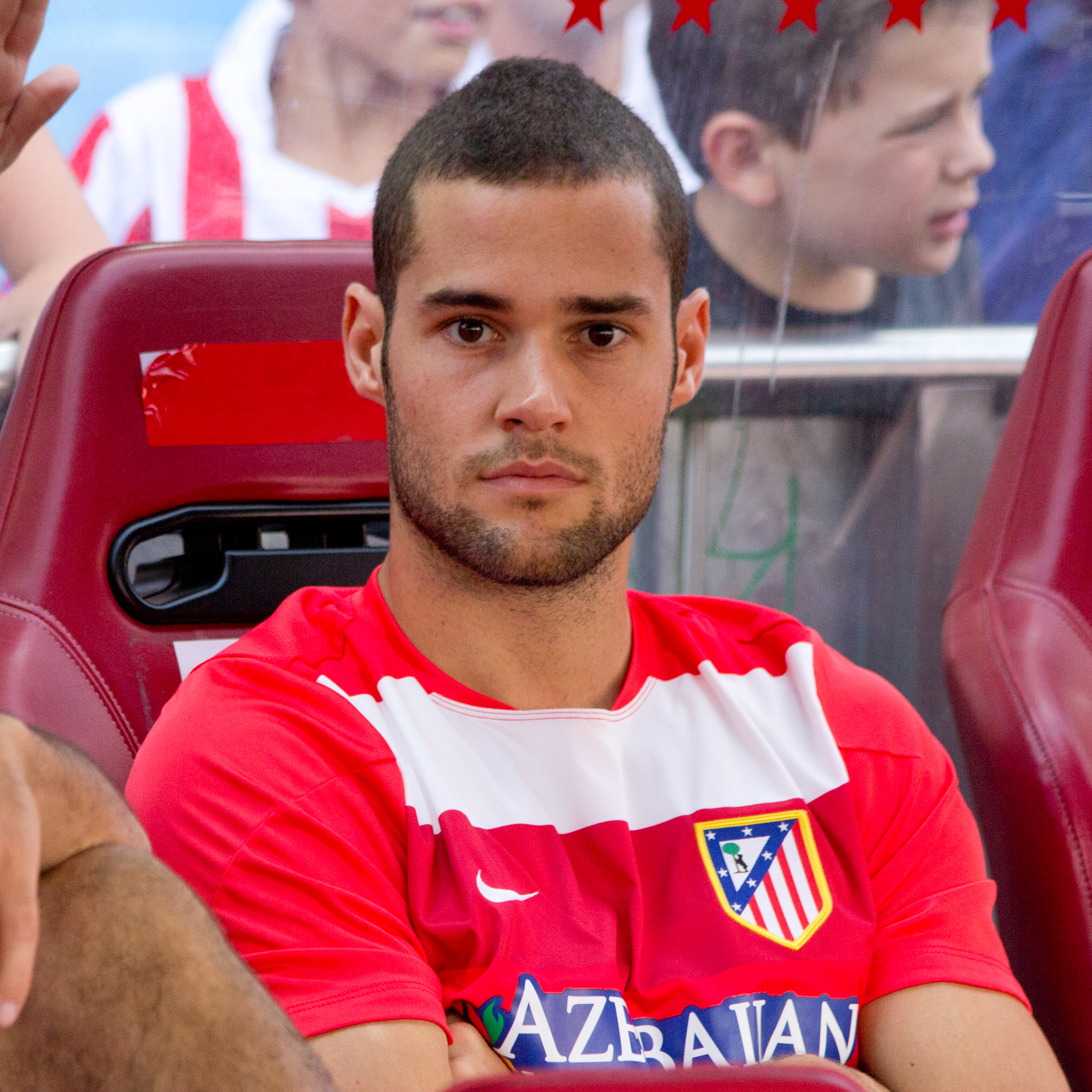
- Suárez with Atlético Madrid in 2013

Personal information
- Full name: Mario Suárez Mata
- Date of birth: 24 February 1987 (age 39)
- Place of birth: Alcobendas, Spain
- Height: 1.88 m (6 ft 2 in)
- Position: Defensive midfielder

Youth career
- 1999–2004: Atlético Madrid

Senior career*
Years	Team	Apps	(Gls)
2004–2006	Atlético Madrid B	38	(4)
2005–2008	Atlético Madrid	4	(0)
2006–2007	→ Valladolid (loan)	23	(3)
2007–2008	→ Celta (loan)	26	(2)
2008–2010	Mallorca	60	(5)
2010–2015	Atlético Madrid	121	(4)
2015–2016	Fiorentina	9	(1)
2016–2017	Watford	15	(0)
2016–2017	→ Valencia (loan)	21	(3)
2017–2018	Guizhou Hengfeng	29	(2)
2019–2023	Rayo Vallecano	91	(11)
Total		437	(35)

International career
2002–2003	Spain U16	8	(1)
2004–2005	Spain U17	11	(1)
2005–2006	Spain U19	10	(3)
2007	Spain U20	4	(1)
2007–2009	Spain U21	5	(0)
2013–2015	Spain	3	(0)
Medal record
Men's football
Representing Spain
UEFA European Under-17 Championship
Runner-up	2004 France
- * Club domestic league appearances and goals

Mario Suárez Mata (Spanish pronunciation: [ˈmaɾjo ˈswaɾeθ ˈmata]; born 24 February 1987) is a Spanish former professional footballer who played as a defensive midfielder.

He amassed La Liga totals of 236 matches and 14 goals over 13 seasons, representing mainly in the competition Atlético Madrid and winning six major titles with the club, including the 2014 national championship and the 2012 Europa League.

Suarez played 38 times for Spain at youth level, making his debut with the full side in 2013.

== Club career ==
=== Atlético Madrid ===
A product of Atlético Madrid's youth system, Suárez was born in Alcobendas, Madrid. He first appeared with the first team on 6 November 2005, playing four minutes in a 0–0 draw at Sevilla FC and going on to make a further three La Liga appearances during the season, including two 90-minute games.

From 2006 to 2008, Suárez served two Segunda División loan stints, being an important element in Real Valladolid's 2007 top-flight return and spending his second year at RC Celta de Vigo. In August 2008 he was purchased by RCD Mallorca, signing a four-year deal that left Atlético the possibility of reacquiring the player.

After two seasons appearing regularly – in the second, he scored five goals in 34 matches to help the Balearic Islands side qualify for the UEFA Europa League – the rebuy clause was activated and Suárez returned to the Colchoneros. In his debut campaign in his second spell, he battled for first-choice status at holding midfielder with Brazilian Paulo Assunção. He netted his first official goal for the club on 10 April 2011, in a 3–0 home win against Real Sociedad.

On 10 August 2014, Suárez was knocked unconscious in a friendly against VfL Wolfsburg, after teammate Cristian Ansaldi's hip hit his head. He suffered a "traumatic brain injury" and stayed for treatment in Germany, while the rest of the team returned to Spain. However, on 19 August, he played the entire first leg of the Supercopa de España, a 1–1 draw away to Real Madrid.

Suárez scored his second competitive goal of 2014–15 on 17 March 2015, through a 27th-minute deflected effort for the only goal against Bayer 04 Leverkusen in the UEFA Champions League's round of 16. He also converted his penalty shootout attempt, in an eventual 3–2 win.

=== Fiorentina ===
On 24 July 2015, Suárez signed for Serie A club ACF Fiorentina, with Stefan Savić moving in the opposite direction. He appeared in only 13 competitive games during his six-month tenure, his maiden league appearance occurring on 23 August in a 2–0 home victory over AC Milan (23 minutes played).

Suárez's sole goal for the Viola came on 1 November 2015, in a 4–1 rout of Frosinone Calcio.

=== Watford ===
On 30 January 2016, after weeks of negotiations, Watford announced the signing of Suárez on a four-and-a-half-year contract, for a €4 million transfer fee. His first Premier League appearance occurred four days later, as he came on as an 87th-minute substitute for Étienne Capoue in a 0–0 home draw against Chelsea.

Suárez signed for Valencia CF on a season-long loan deal on 16 August 2016, with an option of a subsequent purchase. He scored his first brace as a senior on 16 October, in a 2–1 victory at Sporting de Gijón.

=== Later career ===
On 11 July 2017, Suárez transferred to Chinese Super League side Guizhou Hengfeng Zhicheng FC. He returned to Spain on 31 January 2019, joining Rayo Vallecano on a six-month contract. He helped the latter to achieve top-tier promotion at the end of the 2020–21 campaign, contributing 30 games and two goals (110 and 12 during his spell).

Suárez announced his retirement from football in October 2023, aged 36.

== International career ==
Suárez played for Spain in the 2007 FIFA U-20 World Cup in Canada. He scored a penalty in the match against Zambia, in a 2–1 win. Subsequently, he appeared for the under-21s at the 2009 UEFA European Championship in Sweden, in an eventual group-stage exit.

On 6 February 2013, Suárez earned his first cap for the full side, playing the last 20 minutes of the 3–1 friendly win over Uruguay in Doha, Qatar.

== Personal life ==
In June 2017, Suárez married model Malena Costa Sjögren.

== Career statistics ==
=== Club ===
Appearances and goals by club, season and competition
Club	Season	League			National cup		Continental		Other		Total	
Club	Season	Division	Apps	Goals	Apps	Goals	Apps	Goals	Apps	Goals	Apps	Goals
Atlético Madrid	2005–06	La Liga	4	0	2	0	—		—		6	0
Valladolid (loan)	2006–07	Segunda División	23	3	7	1	—		—		30	4
Celta (loan)	2007–08	Segunda División	26	2	1	0	—		—		27	2
Mallorca	2008–09	La Liga	26	0	6	0	—		—		32	0
Mallorca	2009–10	La Liga	34	5	4	1	—		—		38	6
Mallorca	Total		60	5	10	1	—		—		70	6
Atlético Madrid	2010–11	La Liga	27	2	4	0	4 (Note: Appearances in UEFA Europa League)	0	0	0	35	2
Atlético Madrid	2011–12	La Liga	28	0	0	0	14	0	—		42	0
Atlético Madrid	2012–13	La Liga	29	1	8	0	5	0	1 (Note: Appearance in UEFA Super Cup)	0	43	1
Atlético Madrid	2013–14	La Liga	17	0	1	0	5 (Note: Appearances in UEFA Champions League)	0	2 (Note: Appearances in Supercopa de España)	0	25	0
Atlético Madrid	2014–15	La Liga	20	1	6	0	8	1	1	0	35	2
Atlético Madrid	Total		121	4	19	0	36	1	4	0	180	5
Fiorentina	2015–16	Serie A	9	1	0	0	4	0	—		13	1
Watford	2015–16	Premier League	15	0	2	0	—		0	0	17	0
Valencia (loan)	2016–17	La Liga	21	3	3	0	—		—		24	3
Guizhou Hengfeng	2017	Chinese Super League	12	0	0	0	—		—		12	0
Guizhou Hengfeng	2018	Chinese Super League	17	2	1	0	—		—		18	2
Guizhou Hengfeng	Total		29	2	1	0	—		—		30	2
Rayo Vallecano	2018–19	La Liga	14	2	0	0	—		—		14	2
Rayo Vallecano	2019–20	Segunda División	34	7	3	0	—		—		37	7
Rayo Vallecano	2020–21	Segunda División	27	2	4	0	—		3 (Note: Appearances in La Liga play-offs)	0	34	2
Rayo Vallecano	2021–22	La Liga	14	0	7	1	—		—		21	1
Rayo Vallecano	2022–23	La Liga	2	0	2	0	—		—		4	0
Rayo Vallecano	Total		91	11	16	1	—		3	0	110	12
Career total			399	31	61	3	40	1	7	0	507	35

=== International ===
Appearances and goals by national team and year
National team	Year	Apps	Goals
Spain	2013	2	0
Spain	2015	1	0
Total		3	0

== Honours ==
Valladolid

- Segunda División: 2006–07

Atlético Madrid

- La Liga: 2013–14
- Copa del Rey: 2012–13
- Supercopa de España: 2014
- UEFA Europa League: 2011–12
- UEFA Super Cup: 2010, 2012
- UEFA Champions League runner-up: 2013–14

Spain U19

- UEFA European Under-19 Championship: 2006
