= Manu Torres =

Spanish footballer (born 1989)

Personal information
- Full name: Manuel Torres Caturla
- Date of birth: 14 August 1989 (age 37)
- Place of birth: Torremolinos, Spain
- Height: 1.86 m (6 ft 1 in)
- Position: Centre-back

Youth career
- 1996–2006: Málaga

Senior career*
Years	Team	Apps	(Gls)
2006–2009	Málaga B	66	(6)
2009–2011	Málaga	24	(1)
2011–2012	Cartagena	16	(1)
2013–2014	Getafe B	39	(1)
2014–2015	Burgos	10	(0)
2015–2016	Jumilla	21	(1)
2016	Poli Timișoara	13	(0)
2016–2017	Sabadell	26	(2)
2017–2018	Badajoz	27	(0)
2018–2019	Cornellà	16	(1)
Total		258	(13)
- * Club domestic league appearances and goals

Manuel 'Manu' Torres Caturla (Spanish pronunciation: [manˈwel ˈtores]; born 14 August 1989) is a Spanish former professional footballer who played as a central defender.

== Club career ==
A product of local Málaga CF, Torres began his senior career with the club at age 17, playing one match (one minute) for the reserves in 2006–07, in the Segunda División B. Following relegation, he spent a further two full seasons with them.

Torres was promoted to the main squad for the 2009–10 campaign, making his La Liga debut on 30 August 2009 against Atlético Madrid and scoring in the 3–0 home win. He went on to appear in 17 league games in his first year, as the Andalusians narrowly avoided relegation.

On 20 June 2011, Torres signed with FC Cartagena of Segunda División. He scored his only goal on 31 March 2012 in a 2–1 away loss to Real Murcia CF, in an eventual relegation as third-bottom.

In the following years, save for a brief spell in the Romanian Liga I with ACS Poli Timișoara (February–June 2016), Torres continued competing in his country's third tier, representing a host of teams.
