= Ramón Blázquez =

Spanish footballer

Personal information
- Full name: Ramón Blázquez Guerrero
- Date of birth: 5 March 1989 (age 37)
- Place of birth: Tobarra, Spain
- Height: 1.75 m (5 ft 9 in)
- Position: Right back

Youth career
- Albacete
- 2006–2007: Fundación Albacete
- 2007–2008: Villarreal

Senior career*
Years	Team	Apps	(Gls)
2008–2009	Onda	19	(0)
2009–2012	Albacete B	68	(3)
2011–2013	Albacete	9	(0)
2012	→ Leganés (loan)	5	(0)
2013	→ Écija (loan)	9	(0)
2013–2014	Villarrobledo	31	(0)
2014–2016	La Roda	68	(1)
2016–2021	Socuéllamos		
2021–2023	Quintanar del Rey	55	(2)
2023–2024	Toledo	30	(1)
- * Club domestic league appearances and goals as of 23 June 2024

Ramón Blázquez Guerrero (born 5 March 1989) is a Spanish footballer who plays as a right back.

== Football career ==
Born in Tobarra, Province of Albacete, Blázquez signed for Albacete Balompié in 2009 from CD Onda, spending almost two full seasons with the reserves. He made his first-team debut on 19 March 2011, starting in a 0–1 home loss against UD Las Palmas, and finished his first season with nine appearances as the Castile-La Mancha side suffered relegation from the Segunda División.

After loan stints in Segunda División B, with CD Leganés and Écija Balompié, Blázquez terminated his contract with Alba and joined Tercera División club CP Villarrobledo in September 2013. After featuring regularly during the campaign, he moved to La Roda CF in the third level.
