= José Manuel Jurado =

Spanish footballer (born 1986)

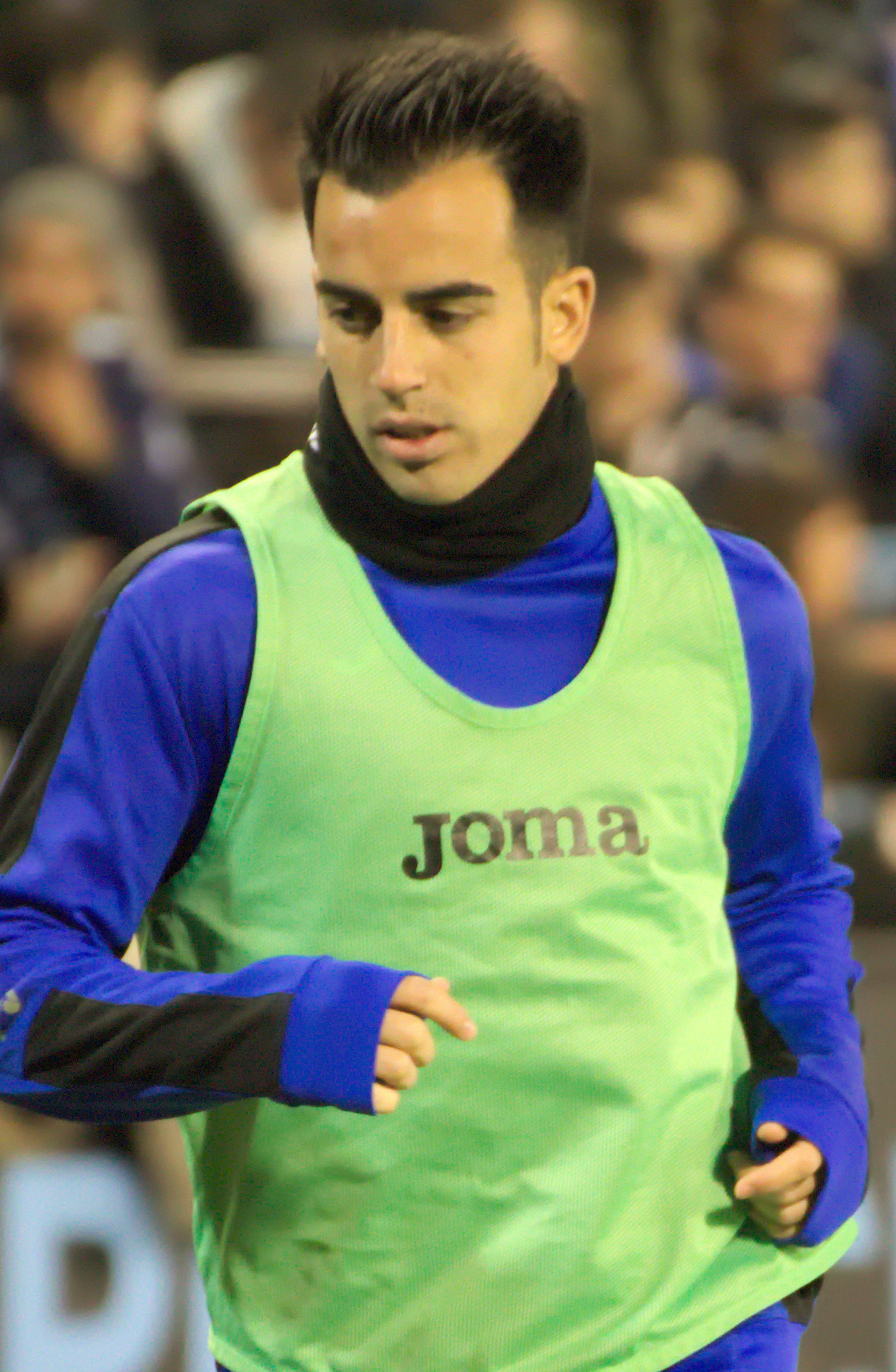
- Jurado with Espanyol in 2017

Personal information
- Full name: José Manuel Jurado Marín
- Date of birth: 29 June 1986 (age 40)
- Place of birth: Sanlúcar de Barrameda, Spain
- Height: 1.76 m (5 ft 9 1/2 in)
- Position: Midfielder

Youth career
- Sanluqueño
- Real Madrid

Senior career*
Years	Team	Apps	(Gls)
2003–2006	Real Madrid B	95	(13)
2005–2006	Real Madrid	3	(0)
2006–2010	Atlético Madrid	88	(10)
2008–2009	→ Mallorca (loan)	35	(9)
2010–2013	Schalke 04	46	(3)
2012–2013	→ Spartak Moscow (loan)	18	(3)
2013–2015	Spartak Moscow	48	(11)
2015–2016	Watford	27	(0)
2016–2018	Espanyol	60	(3)
2018–2019	Al-Ahli	17	(1)
2019	Changchun Yatai	8	(0)
2019–2020	Cádiz	15	(0)
Total		460	(53)

International career
2001–2002	Spain U16	5	(1)
2002–2003	Spain U17	16	(6)
2004–2005	Spain U19	8	(2)
2006–2009	Spain U21	18	(5)
Medal record
Representing Spain
Men's football
FIFA U-17 World Cup
Runner-up	2003 Finland
UEFA European Under-17 Championship
Runner-up	2003 Portugal
- * Club domestic league appearances and goals

José Manuel Jurado Marín (born 29 June 1986) is a Spanish former professional footballer who played as a midfielder.

He played for both major teams in Madrid during his career, Real and Atlético, albeit with no success for the former. He amassed La Liga totals of 186 games and 22 goals over eight seasons, also representing in the competition Mallorca and Espanyol.

In 2010, Jurado signed for Schalke 04, going on to appear in 71 competitive matches in two years and win two major trophies, including the 2011 German Cup. Additionally, he had spells in Russia with Spartak and England with Watford.

== Club career ==
=== Real Madrid ===
Born in Sanlúcar de Barrameda, Province of Cádiz, Jurado was a product of Real Madrid's youth system. He went on to become one of Real Madrid Castilla's most important players.

Jurado made his official debut for the senior team on 29 October 2005 in a 2–0 away win over Real Betis. He made six first-team appearances during his tenure, also taking the field against Olympiacos F.C. in that season's UEFA Champions League.

=== Atlético Madrid ===
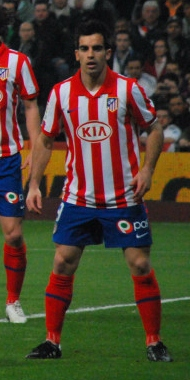
Jurado in action in a Madrid derby in 2010

On 4 August 2006, Jurado moved to city rivals Atlético Madrid for a reported fee of €3 million, signing a four-year contract. However, Real Madrid included a "special clause" in his contract, having the option of buying him back at the end of the 2007–08 campaign for €6 million.

Jurado played 33 league games in 2006–07, mainly due to serious injuries to teammates Martin Petrov and Maxi Rodríguez, but featured sparingly the following season and was loaned to RCD Mallorca in July 2008. He produced outstanding performances during 2008–09, finishing as the Balearic Islands side's second top scorer at nine goals.

On 10 November 2009, Jurado agreed to a new deal at Atlético, keeping him at the club until the summer of 2013. He celebrated his new deal by opening the 6–0 rout of UD Marbella in the Copa del Rey that evening.

During the 2009–10 campaign, Jurado – still not an undisputed starter – was the player with the most official matches for the team, totalling 64 without a single yellow card. He also scored nine times in all competitions as they reached the finals of both the Spanish Cup and the UEFA Europa League, and came on as a substitute in the final of the latter competition.

Jurado started 2010–11 playing eight minutes of the 2–0 victory over Inter Milan in the UEFA Super Cup. On 30 August, he opened an eventual 4–0 home defeat of Sporting de Gijón; however, the following day, he was transferred to FC Schalke 04 in Germany for €13 million, reuniting with his former Real Madrid teammate Raúl.

=== Schalke 04 ===
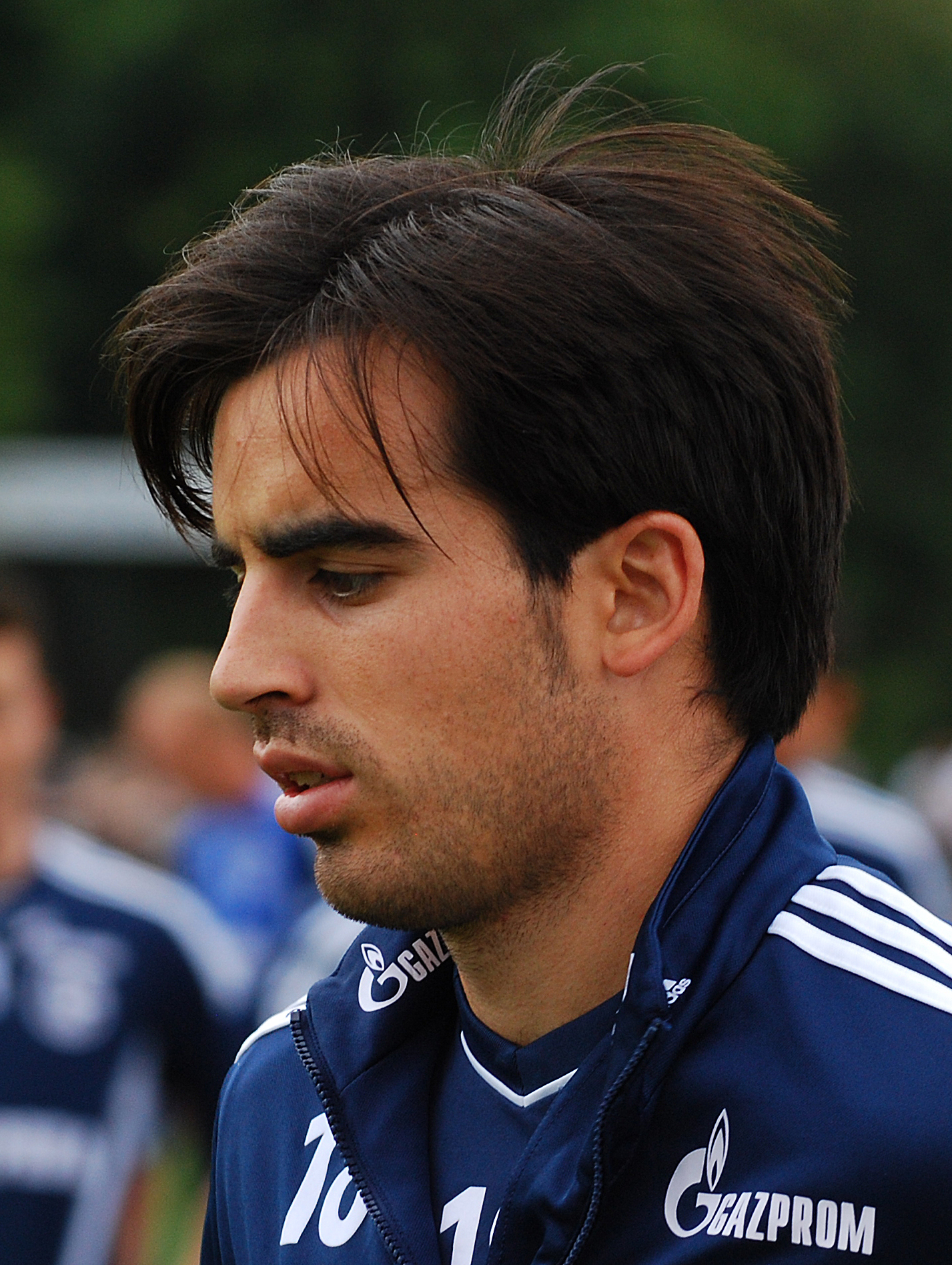
Jurado training with Schalke 04 in August 2011

On 4 December 2010, Jurado scored his first Bundesliga goal for Schalke, helping to a 2–0 home win against FC Bayern Munich. The following game, he opened the 2–1 victory at S.L. Benfica – after a chest pass from Raúl – in the Champions League group stage, which earned the club the first position after the final round; the roles reversed in the quarter-finals second leg 2–1 home victory over Inter (7–3 on aggregate), as the midfielder assisted the forward in the opening goal, and the side ended their European campaign in the semi-finals with Jurado scoring their consolation in a 6–1 aggregate loss to Manchester United.

Jurado finished his only full season in Gelsenkirchen with 44 total appearances, eight goals and five assists. One of those came in the final of the DFB-Pokal, a 5–0 triumph against MSV Duisburg. In the subsequent edition of the DFL-Supercup, he converted his penalty shootout attempt to help defeat Borussia Dortmund 4–3 following a 0–0 draw at the Arena AufSchalke.

=== Spartak Moscow ===
On 4 September 2012, Jurado was loaned to FC Spartak Moscow of the Russian Premier League in a season-long move. The move was made permanent only two months later, being rendered effective the following summer.

Jurado recorded eight goals in 29 games in the 2013–14 campaign, starting on 27 July 2013 with a brace in the Oldest Russian derby, a 4–1 win at city rivals FC Dynamo Moscow. In the reverse fixture, which was also the last matchday, he started a comeback from 2–0 down to 3–2.

=== Watford and Espanyol ===
On 22 July 2015, Jurado signed for newly promoted Premier League team Watford on a three-year deal for an undisclosed fee, reuniting with his compatriot and former Atlético manager Quique Sánchez Flores. He made his debut in the season opener on 8 August, starting in a 2–2 draw at Everton, and played 30 games for the eventual semi-finalists of the FA Cup without scoring.

On 5 July 2016, Jurado returned to his homeland for the first time in six years, signing for RCD Espanyol again under Flores.

=== Later career ===
On 21 June 2018, Jurado moved to Al-Ahli Saudi FC of the Saudi Pro League. The following 28 February, he joined China League One side Changchun Yatai FC.

Jurado returned to Spain on 22 July 2019, with the 33-year-old agreeing to a three-year contract with Segunda División's Cádiz CF as a free agent.

== International career ==
Jurado played for Spain at youth level. He and his teammates finished runners-up at the 2003 UEFA European Under-17 Championship after losing against hosts Portugal 2–1.

Additionally, Jurado represented the nation at the 2003 FIFA U-17 World Championship and the 2009 European Under-21 Championship.

== Career statistics ==
Club	Season	League			National Cup		Continental		Other		Total	
Club	Season	Division	Apps	Goals	Apps	Goals	Apps	Goals	Apps	Goals	Apps	Goals
Real Madrid	2004–05	La Liga	0	0	2	0	0	0	—		2	0
Real Madrid	2005–06	La Liga	3	0	0	0	1 (Note: Appearances in UEFA Champions League)	0	—		4	0
Real Madrid	Total		3	0	2	0	1	0	—		6	0
Atlético Madrid	2006–07	La Liga	33	0	4	0	—		—		37	0
Atlético Madrid	2007–08	La Liga	16	2	1	0	7 (Note: Appearances in UEFA Cup/UEFA Europa League)	1	2 (Note: Appearances in UEFA Intertoto Cup)	0	26	3
Atlético Madrid	2009–10	La Liga	38	7	9	2	17 (Note: Appearances in UEFA Europa League and UEFA Champions League)	0	—		64	9
Atlético Madrid	2010–11	La Liga	1	1	0	0	0	0	1 (Note: Appearance in UEFA Super Cup)	0	2	1
Atlético Madrid	Total		88	10	14	2	24	1	3	0	129	13
Mallorca (loan)	2008–09	La Liga	35	9	6	0	—		—		41	9
Schalke 04	2010–11	Bundesliga	28	3	5	2	11	3	—		44	8
Schalke 04	2011–12	Bundesliga	18	0	2	0	7	1	1 (Note: Appearance in DFL-Supercup)	0	28	1
Schalke 04	Total		46	3	7	2	18	4	1	0	72	9
Spartak Moscow (loan)	2012–13	Russian Premier League	18	3	1	0	5	0	—		24	3
Spartak Moscow	2013–14	Russian Premier League	29	8	2	0	1	0	—		32	8
Spartak Moscow	2014–15	Russian Premier League	18	3	2	0	—		—		20	3
Spartak Moscow	2015–16	Russian Premier League	1	0	0	0	—		—		1	0
Spartak Moscow	Total		66	14	5	0	6	0	—		77	14
Watford	2015–16	Premier League	27	0	3	0	—		—		30	0
Espanyol	2016–17	La Liga	31	3	1	0	—		—		32	3
Espanyol	2017–18	La Liga	29	0	2	0	—		—		31	0
Espanyol	Total		60	3	3	0	—		—		63	3
Al-Ahli	2018–19	Saudi Pro League	17	1	0	0	—		—		17	1
Changchun Yatai	2019	China League One	8	0	0	0	—		—		8	0
Cádiz	2019–20	Segunda División	15	0	0	0	—		—		15	0
Career total			365	40	40	4	49	5	4	0	458	49

== Honours ==
Real Madrid B

- Segunda División B: 2004–05

Atlético Madrid

- UEFA Europa League: 2009–10
- UEFA Super Cup: 2010
- UEFA Intertoto Cup: 2007
- Copa del Rey runner-up: 2009–10

Schalke 04

- DFB-Pokal: 2010–11
- DFL-Supercup: 2011
