= Luis Amaranto Perea =

Colombian footballer (born 1979)

Luis Perea
- Perea as manager of Independiente Medellín in 2026

Personal information
- Full name: Luis Amaranto Perea Mosquera
- Date of birth: 30 January 1979 (age 47)
- Place of birth: Turbo, Colombia
- Height: 1.80 m (5 ft 11 in)
- Position: Defender

Team information
- Current team: Independiente Medellín (manager)

Senior career*
Years	Team	Apps	(Gls)
1999–2003	Independiente Medellín	117	(0)
2003–2004	Boca Juniors	16	(0)
2004–2012	Atlético Madrid	224	(0)
2012–2014	Cruz Azul	70	(5)
Total		427	(5)

International career
2002–2014	Colombia	72	(0)

Managerial career
- 2018: Atlético Madrid (youth)
- 2018–2019: Leones
- 2020: Atlético Junior (assistant)
- 2020–2021: Atlético Junior
- 2022–2026: Colombia (assistant)
- 2026–: Independiente Medellín
- * Club domestic league appearances and goals

Luis Amaranto Perea Mosquera (born 30 January 1979) is a Colombian former professional footballer. He is currently manager of Independiente Medellín.

Gifted with incredible stamina and pace, the central defender could also be adapted at right-back. He spent most of his senior career with Atlético Madrid, appearing in 314 competitive matches over eight La Liga seasons. In 2012, he signed with Cruz Azul.

Perea earned 72 caps for the Colombia national team in more than one decade.

== Club career ==
Perea was born in Turbo. He began his professional career with Independiente Medellín, moving in 2003 to Argentina with Boca Juniors, with whom he won that year's Intercontinental Cup.

In June 2004, Perea signed for Atlético Madrid on a four-year deal, as another centre-back, Pablo Ibáñez, also arrived that season. Both were the starters as the Colchoneros returned to the UEFA Champions League in 2008–09 after a 12-year absence, with Perea appearing in 30 La Liga matches; after the campaign kicked off, he received his Spanish passport.

After the signing of Fiorentina's Tomáš Ujfaluši for the 2008–09, Perea saw some additional time at right-back, but eventually lost that place to another newly signed, John Heitinga. From 2009 to 2011, with the latter departed to Everton, he managed to total 56 league games, with qualification for the UEFA Europa League in his second season after a seventh-place finish.

On 29 September 2011, following a Europa League fixture against Rennes, Perea became the foreign player with most competitive appearances for Atlético Madrid with 289, surpassing Argentine Jorge Griffa. He left the club at the end of the 2011–12 campaign at the age of 33, after having contributed 34 official games and won the Europa League.

Perea joined Mexico's Cruz Azul in June 2012 as a free agent, winning the following year's Copa MX and the 2013–14 CONCACAF Champions League. In December 2015, after one year out of football due to injury, the 36-year-old chose to retire, settling in Madrid and focusing on becoming a coach.

== International career ==
A Colombia international since 20 November 2002, in a 1–0 friendly loss with Honduras in San Pedro Sula, Perea appeared at the 2007 and 2011 Copa América tournaments. He was named team captain before the 2014 FIFA World Cup qualification match against Bolivia in La Paz, in a first-ever win in that country (2–1), and represented his nation for 12 years.

== Coaching career ==
In late August 2018, following a brief spell in Atlético's youth academy, Perea was appointed at Leones in his country's Categoría Primera A for his first managerial experience. On 28 May 2019, with the team back in the Primera B after relegation, he resigned.

On 14 September 2020, Perea replaced the dismissed Julio Comesaña at the helm of Atlético Junior. He oversaw elimination from the Copa Libertadores after losing 3–1 to Flamengo, but qualified for the second phase of the Copa Sudamericana by finishing third in their group.

Perea joined the national team's coaching staff in June 2022. He returned to head coaching duties four years later, at Independiente Medellín also in the Colombian top division.

== Honours ==
Independiente Medellín

- Categoría Primera A: 2002–II

Boca Juniors

- Argentine Primera División: 2003–04
- Intercontinental Cup: 2003

Atlético Madrid

- UEFA Europa League: 2009–10, 2011–12
- UEFA Super Cup: 2010
- UEFA Intertoto Cup: 2007
- Copa del Rey runner-up: 2009–10

Cruz Azul

- Copa MX: Clausura 2013
- CONCACAF Champions League: 2013–14
