= 2005–06 Atlético Madrid season =

100th season in existence of Atlético Madrid

Atlético Madrid
2005–06 season
- President: Enrique Cerezo
- Head coach: Carlos Bianchi; José Murcia
- Stadium: Vicente Calderón
- La Liga: 10th
- Copa del Rey: Round of 16
- Top goalscorer: Fernando Torres (13)
Home colours	Away colours

The 2005–06 season was the 100th season in Atlético Madrid's history and their 69rd season in La Liga, the top division of Spanish football. It covers a period from 1 July 2005 to 30 June 2006.

Atlético Madrid failed to live up to the high expectations, in spite of the appointment of multiple Copa Libertadores-winning coach Carlos Bianchi. The defensive triangle of goalkeeper Leo Franco and central defenders Luis Perea and Pablo Ibáñez, all of which played a huge part in Atlético conceding only 31 goals. The defensive tactics left high-profile striker Fernando Torres alone up front, and despite having Maxi Rodríguez in support, the duo were the only players able to function offensively for the club, which responded with a €23 million signing of 18-year-old wonnderkid Sergio Agüero from Independiente.

Atlético had a rough start to the season, winning just one of their first 5 games. However, that game was against reigning La Liga champions Barcelona. After that, Atlético seemed to show some signs of revival with three wins in their next 6, but they did get humiliated 3-0 by Real Madrid at home. However they would then sustain their worst form of the season with 0 wins in 10 games, including losses against Celta Vigo, CA Osasuna and Real Betis, and their poor attack being exposed for all to see. Things improved significantly at the beginning of the second half of the season, going on a 5-game winning streak and impressively doing the double over Barcelona. That soon became false hope, with them winning just 3 times the rest of the season and finishing in a lowly 10th place.

The Copa del Rey brought no sense of improvement either. After iffy wins versus Las Palmas and Alcoyano in the third round and fourth round, both of whom were in the third tier of spanish football, Atlético then lost 3-2 on aggregate to Zaragoza. Despite a tiny bit of improvement from last season, it was an underwhelming season to forget.

== Squad ==
No.	Player	Nationality	Date of birth (age)	Signed from
GK
23	Leo Franco	(Argentina)	20 May 1977 (aged 28)	(Spain) Mallorca
1	Iván Cuéllar	(Spain)	27 May 1984 (aged 21)	(Spain) Atlético Madrid Academy
33	Roberto	(Spain)	10 February 1986 (aged 19)	(Spain) Atlético Madrid Academy
30	Ismael Falcón	(Spain)	24 April 1984 (aged 21)	(Spain) Cádiz
DF
21	Luis Perea	(Colombia)	30 January 1979 (aged 26)	(Argentina) Boca Juniors
22	Pablo Ibáñez	(Spain)	3 August 1981 (aged 24)	(Spain) Albacete Balompié
5	García Calvo	(Spain)	1 April 1975 (aged 30)	(Spain) Real Valladolid
31	Mario Suárez	(Spain)	24 February 1987 (aged 18)	(Spain) Mallorca
27	Pablo Sicilia	(Spain)	10 September 1981 (aged 24)	(Spain) Vecindario
2	Antonio López	(Spain)	13 September 1981 (aged 24)	(Spain) Osasuna
3	Juan Velasco	(Spain)	17 May 1977 (aged 28)	(Spain) Celta Vigo
18	Juan Valera	(Spain)	21 December 1984 (aged 21)	(Spain) Real Murcia
15	Francisco Molinero	(Spain)	26 July 1985 (aged 20)	(Spain) Atlético Madrid Academy
31	Antonio Moreno	(Spain)	13 February 1983 (aged 22)	(Spain) Atlético Madrid Academy
38	Julián Vara	(Spain)	17 November 1983 (aged 22)	(Spain) Atlético Madrid Academy
MF
23	Peter Luccin	(France)	9 April 1979 (aged 26)	(Spain) Celta Vigo
4	Gonzalo Colsa	(Spain)	2 April 1979 (aged 26)	(Spain) Racing Santander
6	José Zahínos	(Spain)	1 December 1977 (aged 28)	(Spain) Atlético Madrid Academy
20	Gabi	(Spain)	10 July 1983 (aged 22)	(Spain) Atlético Madrid Academy
8	Ariel Ibagaza	(Argentina)	27 October 1976 (aged 29)	(Spain) Mallorca
FW
17	Martin Petrov	(Bulgaria)	15 January 1979 (aged 26)	(Germany) Wolfsburg
11	Maxi Rodríguez	(Argentina)	2 January 1981 (aged 24)	(Spain) Espanyol
7	Luciano Galletti	(Argentina)	4 December 1984 (aged 21)	(Spain) Zaragoza
37	Fernando Marqués	(Spain)	2 January 1981 (aged 24)	(Spain) Racing Santander
9	Fernando Torres	(Spain)	20 March 1984 (aged 21)	(Spain) Atlético Madrid Academy
10	Mateja Kežman	(Serbia and Montenegro)	12 April 1979 (aged 26)	(England) Chelsea
14	Javier Arizmendi	(Spain)	3 March 1984 (aged 21)	(Spain) Atlético Madrid Academy
26	Braulio Nóbrega	(Spain)	18 September 1985 (aged 20)	(Spain) Atlético Madrid Academy
28	Manu del Moral	(Spain)	25 February 1984 (aged 21)	(Spain) Atlético Madrid Academy
40	Rufino Segovia	(Spain)	1 March 1985 (aged 20)	(Spain) Rayo Vallecano

== Transfers ==
=== In ===
Pos.	No.	Player	From	Fee	Ref.
FW	17	(Bulgaria) Martin Petrov	(Germany) Wolfsburg	£8,700,000	
FW	10	(Serbia and Montenegro) Mateja Kežman	(England) Chelsea	£7,800,000	
FW	11	(Argentina) Maxi Rodríguez	(Spain) Espanyol	£4,300,000	
FW	7	(Argentina) Luciano Galletti	(Spain) Zaragoza	£2,200,000	
DF	18	(Spain) Juan Valera	(Spain) Real Murcia	Free Transfer	

=== Out ===
Pos.	No.	Player	To	Fee
FW	11	(Denmark) Jesper Grønkjær	(Germany) Stuttgart	£2,600,000
FW	14	(Spain) Javier Arizmendi	(Spain) Deportivo de La Coruña	£1,700,000
FW	8	(Uruguay) Richard Núñez	(Mexico) Cruz Azul	Free Transfer
FW	20	(Serbia and Montenegro) Veljko Paunović	(Spain) Getafe	Free Transfer
DF	6	(Spain) Santi Denia	(Spain) Albacete Balompie	Free Transfer
DF	2	(Romania) Cosmin Contra	(Spain) Getafe	Free Transfer
GK	1	(Spain) Sergio Sánchez	(Spain) Hércules CF	Free Transfer
DF	15	(Spain) Carlos Aguilera	Retired	None
DF	12	(Spain) Sergi Barjuán	Retired	None

=== Loans Out ===
Pos.	No.	Player	To	Fee	Ref.
FW	8	(Democratic Republic of the Congo) Kiki Musampa	(England) Manchester City	None	
MF	10	(Spain) Jorge Larena	(Spain) Celta Vigo	None	
MF	7	(Uruguay) Marcelo Sosa	(Spain) Osasuna	None	
FW	28	(Spain) Toché	(Spain) Hércules	None	
FW	26	(Spain) Braulio Nóbrega	(Spain) Mallorca	None	
MF	29	(Spain) Raúl Medina	(Spain) Ciudad de Murcia	None	

== Competitions ==
=== Pre-season ===
29 July 2005 Friendly match	Ipswich Town	1–2	Atlético Madrid	Ipswich, United Kingdom
	Westlake 18'		Kežman 34'; Pablo 62'	Stadium: Portman Road

=== Copa del Rey ===
19 October 2005 Third Round	Las Palmas	0–1	Atlético Madrid	Las Palmas
11:00 CET			Kežman 86'	Stadium: Estadio Gran Canaria; Referee: Xavier Moreno Delgado

30 November 2005 Fourth Round	Alcoyano	0–1	Atlético Madrid	Alcoy
8:55 CET		Report		Stadium: Estadio El Collao

11 January 2006 Last 16 1st Leg	Atlético Madrid	0–1	Zaragoza	Madrid
7:00 CET			Ewerthon 57'	Stadium: Vicente Calderon Stadium; Referee: Mejuto Gonzalez

18 January 2006 Last 16 2nd Leg	Zaragoza	2-2 (3-2 agg.)	Atlético Madrid	Zaragoza
6:00 CET	Cani 9'; González 26'		Galletti 32'; Kežman 61'	Attendance: 30,000; Referee: Eduardo Iturralde Gonzalez

=== La Liga ===
==== Table ====
Pos	Team	Pld	W	D	L	GF	GA	GD	Pts
8	Deportivo La Coruña	38	15	10	13	47	45	+2	55
9	Getafe	38	15	9	14	54	49	+5	54
10	Atlético Madrid	38	13	13	12	45	37	+8	52
11	Zaragoza	38	10	16	12	46	51	−5	46
12	Athletic Bilbao	38	11	12	15	40	46	−6	45

Source: LFP
Rules for classification: 1st points; 2nd head-to-head points; 3rd head-to-head goal difference; 4th head-to-head goals scored; 5th goal difference; 6th number of goals scored; 7th Fair-play points

==== Results by round ====
Round	1	2	3	4	5	6	7	8	9	10	11	12	13	14	15	16	17	18	19	20	21	22	23	24	25	26	27	28	29	30	31	32	33	34	35	36	37	38
Ground	H	A	H	A	H	A	H	A	H	A	H	A	H	A	H	A	A	H	A	A	H	A	H	A	H	A	H	A	H	A	H	A	H	A	H	H	A	H
Result	D	L	W	L	L	W	L	W	W	D	D	L	D	D	D	D	L	D	L	W	W	W	W	W	W	L	W	D	L	D	L	D	W	W	L	L	D	D
Position	8	17	7	18	18	7	10	15	12	12	11	11	11	11	11	10	12	12	14	11	11	11	9	9	9	9	8	9	9	9	9	10	9	8	9	10	10	10
Points	1	1	4	4	4	7	7	10	13	14	15	15	16	17	18	19	19	20	20	23	26	29	32	35	38	38	41	42	42	43	43	44	47	50	50	50	51	52

A = Away; H = Home; W = Win; D = Draw; L = Loss

==== Matches ====
Win Draw Loss Fixtures

28 August 2005 1	Atlético Madrid	0–0	Zaragoza	Madrid
7:00 CET		Report		Stadium: Vicente Calderon Stadium; Attendance: 55,000; Referee: Iturralde González

10 September 2005 2	Deportivo	1–0	Atlético Madrid	A Coruña
9:00 CET	Capdevila 90+4'	Report		Stadium: Estadio Riazor; Attendance: 24,000; Referee: Arturo Dauden Ibanez

18 September 2005 3	Atlético Madrid	2-1	Barcelona	Madrid
10:00 CET	Torres 16'; Kežman 47'	Report	Eto'o 4'	Stadium: Vicente Calderon Stadium; Attendance: 48,000; Referee: Luis Medina Cantalejo

21 September 2005 4	Real Sociedad	3-2	Atlético Madrid	San Sebastián
10:00 CET	Kovačević 56' (88); Kavehci 82'	Report	Torres 10'; Kežman 19'	Stadium: Anoeta Stadium; Attendance: 21,493; Referee: Fernando Teixeira Vitienes

24 September 2005 5	Atlético Madrid	0-1	Getafe	Madrid
9:00		Report	Mariano Pernia 71'; Mario Cotelo (red card) 61'	Stadium: Vicente Calderon Stadium; Attendance: 45,000

2 October 2005 6	Málaga	0-2	Atlético Madrid	Málaga
10:00		Report	Torres 65' (pen.); Kežman 74'	Stadium: La Rosaleda; Attendance: 22,000; Referee: Javier Turienzo Alvarez

15 October 2005 7	Atlético Madrid	0-3	Real Madrid	Madrid
11:00		Report	Ronaldo 9' (pen.), 61'; Luis Perea 90'	Stadium: Vicente Calderon Stadium; Attendance: 55,000; Referee: Bernardino Gonzalez Vazquez

23 October 2005 8	Racing Santander	0-1	Atlético Madrid	Santander
8:00		Report	M. Rodriguez 46'	Stadium: El Sardinero; Attendance: 15,331; Referee: Rafael Ramírez Domínguez

27 October 2005 9	Atlético Madrid	3-0	Cádiz	Madrid
9:00	M. Rodriguez 22'; Ibanez 62'; Galletti 85'	Report		Stadium: Vicente Calderon Stadium; Attendance: 47,000; Referee: Fernando Teixeira Vitienes

30 October 2005 10	Atlético Madrid	1-1	Villarreal	Madrid
8:00	Zahinos 5'; Luccin (red card) 88'	Report	G.Rodriguez (red card) 16'; Forlan 90+4'	Stadium: Vicente Calderon Stadium

6 November 2005 11	Sevilla	0-0	Atlético Madrid	Seville
7:00		Report		Stadium: Ramon Sanchez Pizjuan; Attendance: 40,000; Referee: Mejuto Gonzalez

20 November 2005 12	Celta Vigo	2-1	Atlético Madrid	Vigo
6:00	Baiano 27'; Canobbio 54'	Report	López 61'	Stadium: Balaídos; Attendance: 28,000; Referee: Alfonso Pérez Burrull

27 November 2005 13	Atlético Madrid	1-1	Espanyol	Madrid
6:00	Luccin 9'	Report	Jarque	Stadium: Vicente Calderon Stadium; Attendance: 35,000; Referee: Arturo Daudén Ibáñez

3 December 2005 14	Athletic Bilbao	1-1	Atlético Madrid	Bilbao
11:00	Kežman 12'		Orbaiz 90'	Stadium: San Mames; Attendance: 38,000; Referee: Bernardino González Vázquez

11 December 2005 15	Atlético Madrid	1-1	Alaves	Madrid
6:00	Torres 65'	Report	Sarriegi	Stadium: Vicente Calderon Stadium; Attendance: 35,000; Referee: Rafael Ramírez Domínguez

18 December 2005 16	Mallorca	2-2	Atlético Madrid	Palma, Mallorca
https://www.espn.co.uk/football/match/_/gameId/188592	Iuliano 19', 84'	Report	M. Rodriguez 1'; Colsa 13'	Stadium: Estadi Mallorca Son Moix; Attendance: 15,000

22 December 2005 17	Osasuna	2-1	Atlético Madrid	Pamplona
11:00	R.Garcia 29'; Romeo 33'	Report	Petrov 25'	Stadium: El Sadar Stadium; Attendance: 14,691; Referee: Evaristo Puentes Leira

8 January 2006 18	Atlético Madrid	0-0	Valencia	Madrid
10:00		Report		Stadium: Vicente Calderon Stadium; Attendance: 35,000; Referee: César Muñiz Fernández

14 January 2006 19	Real Betis	1-0	Atlético Madrid	Seville
9:00	Capi 29'	Report		Stadium: Estadio Benito Villamarín; Attendance: 45,000; Referee: Miguel Ángel Ayza Gámez

21 January 2006 20	Zaragoza	0-2	Atlético Madrid	Zaragoza
7:00		Report	M.Rodriguez 28'; Torres 59' (pen.)	Stadium: Estadio La Romareda; Attendance: 30,000; Referee: Eduardo Iturralde González

28 January 2006 21	Atlético Madrid	3-2	Deportivo	Madrid
9:00	M. Rodriguez 32', 82'; López 54'	Report	Castro 47'; Capdevila 58'	Stadium: Vicente Calderon Stadium; Attendance: 40,000; Referee: David Fernández Borbalán

5 February 2006 22	Barcelona	1-3	Atlético Madrid	Barcelona
7:00	Torres 33', 79'; M. Rodriguez 46'	Report	Larsson 65'	Stadium: Camp Nou; Attendance: 78,784; Referee: Vicente José Lizondo Cortés

12 February 2006 23	Atlético Madrid	1-0	Real Sociedad	Madrid
7:00	Kežman 83'	Report		Stadium: Vicente Calderon Stadium; Attendance: 50,000; Referee: Evaristo Puentes Leira

19 February 2006 24	Getafe	0-3	Atlético Madrid	Getafe
9:00		Report	Luccin 29'; M. Rodriguez 48'; Torres 63'	Stadium: Estadio Coliseum; Attendance: 15,500; Referee: Fernando Teixeira Vitienes

25 February 2006 25	Atlético Madrid	5-0	Málaga	Madrid
8:00	Torres 5', 9'; M. Rodriguez 39'; Valera 66', 89'	Report		Stadium: Vicente Calderon Stadium; Attendance: 30,000; Referee: Julián Rodríguez Santiago

4 March 2006 26	Real Madrid	2-1	Atlético Madrid	Madrid
6:00	Cassano 5'; Baptista 40'	Report	Kežman 28'	Stadium: Estadio Santiago Bernabeu; Attendance: 75,000; Referee: Luis Medina Cantalejo

12 March 2006 27	Atlético Madrid	2-1	Racing Santander	Madrid
6:00	Torres 65' (pen.); Ibáñez 74'	Report	Abella 70'	Stadium: Vicente Calderon Stadium; Attendance: 45,000; Referee: Bernardino González Vázquez

18 March 2006 28	Villarreal	1-1	Atlético Madrid	Villarreal
6:00	Forlan 10'	Report	Torres 58'	Stadium: Estadio de la Cerámica; Attendance: 19,000; Referee: Undiano Mallenco

23 March 2006 29	Atlético Madrid	0-1	Sevilla	Madrid
6:00		Report	Puerta 78'	Stadium: Vicente Calderon Stadium; Attendance: 52,000; Referee: Miguel Ángel Ayza Gámez

26 March 2006 30	Cádiz	1-1	Atlético Madrid	Cádiz
5:00	Lobos 68' (pen.)	Report	Kežman 33'	Stadium: Nuevo Mirandilla; Attendance: 20,000; Referee: Miguel Ángel Pérez Lasa

2 April 2006 31	Atlético Madrid	0-3	Celta Vigo	Madrid
5:00		Report	Lequi 69'; Baiano 83' (pen.); de Ridder 89'	Stadium: Vicente Calderon Stadium; Attendance: 55,000; Referee: Vicente José Lizondo Cortés

9 April 2006 32	Espanyol	1-1	Atlético Madrid	Barcelona
5:00	Pandiani 82'	Report	Gabi 47'	Stadium: Estadi Olímpic Lluís Companys; Attendance: 22,850; Referee: César Muñiz Fernández

16 April 2006 33	Atlético Madrid	1-0	Athletic Bilbao	Madrid
5:00	Torres 82'	Report		Stadium: Vicente Calderon Stadium; Attendance: 30,000; Referee: Undiano Mallenco

22 April 2006 34	Alaves	0-1	Atlético Madrid	Vitoria-Gasteiz
5:00		Report	López 23'	Stadium: Mendizorrotza; Attendance: 14,436; Referee: Rafael Ramírez Domínguez

30 April 2006 35	Atlético Madrid	0-1	Mallorca	Madrid
5:00		Report	Gutiérrez 79'	Stadium: Vicente Calderon Stadium; Attendance: 36,500

3 May 2006 36	Atlético Madrid	0-1	Osasuna	Madrid
7:00	Ibagaza (red card) 90+1'	Report	Muñoz 16'; Clavero (red card) 58'	Stadium: Vicente Calderon Stadium; Attendance: 44,000; Referee: Eduardo Iturralde González

6 May 2006 37	Valencia	1-1	Atlético Madrid	Valencia
5:00	Villa 11' (pen.)	Report	M.Rodriguez 18'	Stadium: Estadio Mestalla; Attendance: 40,000; Referee: Evaristo Puentes Leira

13 May 2006 38	Atlético Madrid	1-1	Real Betis	Madrid
7:00	Kežman 24'	Report	Arzu 76'	Stadium: Vicente Calderon Stadium; Attendance: 20,000; Referee: Alfonso Pino Zamorano

== Statistics ==
=== Top scorers ===
Rank	Player	La Liga	Copa del Rey	Total
1	(Spain) Fernando Torres	13	0	13
2	(Argentina) Maxi Rodríguez	10	1	11
3	(Serbia and Montenegro) Mateja Kežman	8	2	10
4	(Spain) Antonio López	3	0	3
5	(Argentina) Luciano Galletti	1	1	2
5	(Spain) Juan Valera	2	0	2
5	(Spain) Pablo Ibáñez	2	0	2
5	(France) Peter Luccin	2	0	2
9	(Spain) Gonzalo Colsa	1	0	1
9	(Spain) Zahínos	1	0	1
9	(Bulgaria) Martin Petrov	1	0	1
9	(Spain) Gabi	1	0	1
Own goals		0	0	0
Totals		45	4	49
