= 2003–04 Atlético Madrid season =

98th season in existence of Atlético Madrid

Atlético de Madrid
2003–04 season
- President: Enrique Cerezo
- Head coach: Gregorio Manzano
- Stadium: Vicente Calderón
- La Liga: 7th
- Copa del Rey: Quarter-finals
- Top goalscorer: Fernando Torres (19)
Home colours	Away colours

The 2003–04 season was the 98th season in Atlético Madrid's history and their 67rd season in La Liga, the top division of Spanish football. It covers a period from 1 July 2003 to 30 June 2004. The season saw Fernando Torres taking another step towards superstardom, scoring 19 goals in the season during which he turned 20 years, which led to a call-up to the Spain national team for UEFA Euro 2004. The finish was still not enough to satisfy the owner family Gil, resulting in coach Gregorio Manzano unexpectedly getting the sack.

== Squad ==
=== Goalkeepers ===
- (Argentina) Germán Burgos
- (Spain) Sergio Aragoneses
- (Spain) Juanma
- (Spain) Ismael Falcón

=== Defenders ===
- (Romania) Cosmin Contra
- (Spain) García Calvo
- (Spain) Santi
- (Spain) Sergi
- (Argentina) Matías Lequi
- (Spain) Gaspar Gálvez
- (Spain) Iván Romero

=== Midfielders ===
- (Uruguay) Gonzalo de los Santos
- (Netherlands) Kiki Musampa
- (Spain) Jorge Larena
- (Uruguay) Rubén Olivera
- (Argentina) Diego Simeone
- (Spain) Carlos Aguilera
- (Spain) Nano
- (Argentina) Ariel Ibagaza
- (Brazil) Rodrigo Fabri
- (Spain) Álvaro Novo
- (Spain) Diego Rivas
- (Spain) Juanma Ortiz
- (Spain) Gabi

=== Attackers ===
- (Spain) Fernando Torres
- (Serbia and Montenegro) Veljko Paunović
- (Greece) Demis Nikolaidis
- (Spain) Toché
- (Spain) Arizmendi

== Competitions ==
=== La Liga ===
==== League table ====
Pos	Team	Pld	W	D	L	GF	GA	GD	Pts	Qualification or relegation
5	Athletic Bilbao	38	15	11	12	53	49	+4	56	Qualification for the UEFA Cup first round
6	Sevilla	38	15	10	13	56	45	+11	55 (Note: SEV 2–0 ATM; ATM 2–1 SEV)	Qualification for the UEFA Cup first round
7	Atlético Madrid	38	15	10	13	51	53	−2	55	Qualification for the Intertoto Cup third round
8	Villarreal	38	15	9	14	47	49	−2	54	Qualification for the Intertoto Cup second round
9	Real Betis	38	13	13	12	46	43	+3	52	

Source: LFP
Rules for classification: 1st points; 2nd head-to-head points; 3rd head-to-head goal difference; 4th head-to-head goals scored; 5th goal difference; 6th number of goals scored; 7th Fair-play points
Notes:
- Sevilla–Atlético Madrid 1-0
- 1-0 Júlio Baptista 25'
- Atlético Madrid–Albacete 1-0
- 1-0 Jorge Larena 49'
- Osasuna–Atlético Madrid 1-0
- 1-0 Pablo García 36'
- Atlético Madrid–Valencia 0-3
- 0-1 Vicente 68'
- 0-2 Mista 77'
- 0-3 Mista 90'
- Atlético Madrid–Barcelona 0-0
- Deportivo–Atlético Madrid 5-1
- 1-0 Fran 6'
- 1-1 Matías Lequi 11'
- 2-1 Enrique Romero 31'
- 3-1 Sergio 50'
- 4-1 Walter Pandiani 55'
- 5-1 Lionel Scaloni 90'
- Atlético Madrid–Mallorca 2-1
- 1-0 Fernando Torres 26'
- 1-1 Samuel Eto'o 38'
- 2-1 Jorge Larena 90'
- Real Murcia–Atlético Madrid 1-3
- 0-1 Fernando Torres 13' (pen.)
- 0-2 Demis Nikolaidis 37'
- 1-2 David Karanka 70'
- 1-3 Fernando Torres 83'
- Atlético Madrid–Real Sociedad 4-0
- 1-0 Demis Nikolaidis 18'
- 2-0 Fernando Torres 57' (pen.)
- 3-0 Fernando Torres 65'
- 4-0 Diego Simeone 80'
- Betis–Atlético Madrid 1-2
- 1-0 Marcos Assunção 20'
- 1-1 Fernando Torres 40'
- 1-2 Fernando Torres 49' (pen.)
- Atlético Madrid–Villarreal 1-0
- 1-0 Álvaro Novo 55'
- Valladolid–Atlético Madrid 3-1
- 0-1 Kiki Musampa 13'
- 1-1 Ariza Makukula 21'
- 2-1 Víctor Zapata 37'
- 3-1 Francisco Sousa 65'
- Atlético Madrid–Málaga 2-0
- 1-0 Gonzalo de los Santos 5'
- 2-0 Demis Nikolaidis 73'
- Real Madrid–Atlético Madrid 2-0
- 1-0 Ronaldo 1'
- 2-0 Raúl 20'
- Atlético Madrid–Espanyol 2-0
- 1-0 Fernando Torres 21'
- 2-0 Fernando Torres 74'
- Celta Vigo–Atlético Madrid 2-2
- 0-1 Diego Simeone 17'
- 1-1 Peter Luccin 37'
- 2-1 Savo Milošević 40'
- 2-2 Matías Lequi 83'
- Atlético Madrid–Racing Santander 2-2
- 0-1 Sergio Matabuena 53'
- 1-1 Veljko Paunović 62'
- 2-1 Kiki Musampa 69'
- 2-2 Jonatan Valle 79'
- Real Zaragoza–Atlético Madrid 0-0
- Atlético Madrid–Athletic Bilbao 3-0
- 1-0 Fernando Torres 73'
- 2-0 Fernando Torres 83' (pen.)
- 3-0 Veljko Paunović 90'
- Atlético Madrid–Sevilla 2-1
- 1-0 Fernando Torres 42'
- 2-0 Demis Nikolaidis 70'
- 2-1 José Antonio Reyes 75'
- Albacete–Atlético Madrid 1-1
- 0-1 Nano 32'
- 1-1 Matías Lequi 60' (o.g.)
- Atlético Madrid–Osasuna 1-1
- 0-1 Valdo 24'
- 1-1 Demis Nikolaidis 90'
- Valencia–Atlético Madrid 3-0
- 1-0 Mista 30'
- 2-0 Vicente 65'
- 3-0 Mista 70'
- Barcelona–Atlético Madrid 3-1
- 1-0 Javier Saviola 9'
- 1-1 Demis Nikolaidis 21'
- 2-1 Ronaldinho 24'
- 3-1 Luis García Sanz 43'
- Atlético Madrid–Deportivo 0-0
- Mallorca–Atlético Madrid 0-1
- 0-1 Fernando Torres 89'
- Atlético Madrid–Real Murcia 1-1
- 0-1 Luis García Fernández 54' (pen.)
- 1-1 Nano 90'
- Real Sociedad–Atlético Madrid 2-1
- 1-0 Valeri Karpin 34' (pen.)
- 2-0 Diego Simeone 41' (o.g.)
- 2-1 Veljko Paunović 70'
- Atlético Madrid–Betis 2-1
- 1-0 Veljko Paunović 51'
- 1-1 Joaquín 67'
- 2-1 Fernando Torres 68'
- Villarreal–Atlético Madrid 0-0
- Atlético Madrid–Valladolid 2-1
- 1-0 Fernando Torres 23'
- 2-0 Veljko Paunović 45'
- 2-1 Pablo Richetti 64'
- Málaga–Atlético Madrid 3-1
- 1-0 Ivan Leko 31'
- 2-0 Diego Alonso 45'
- 2-1 Nano 45'
- 3-1 Diego Alonso 49'
- Atlético Madrid–Real Madrid 1-2
- 0-1 Santiago Solari 5'
- 1-1 Veljko Paunović 47'
- 1-2 Iván Helguera 77'
- Espanyol–Atlético Madrid 3-1
- 1-0 Fredson 64'
- 2-0 Claudiu Răducanu 82'
- 3-0 Claudiu Răducanu 88'
- 3-1 Fernando Torres 90'
- Atlético Madrid–Celta Vigo 3-2
- 1-0 Nano 2'
- 2-0 Fernando Torres 6'
- 2-1 Savo Milošević 32'
- 3-1 García Calvo 39'
- 3-2 Edu 70'
- Racing Santander–Atlético Madrid 2-2
- 0-1 Ariel Ibagaza 25'
- 1-1 Cristian Álvarez 57'
- 1-2 Gonzalo de los Santos 59'
- 2-2 Omri Afek 90'
- Atlético Madrid–Real Zaragoza 1-2
- 1-0 Nano 65'
- 1-1 Delio Toledo 90'
- 1-2 Delio Toledo 90'
- Athletic Bilbao–Atlético Madrid 3-4
- 1-0 Andoni Iraola 19'
- 1-1 Ariel Ibagaza 26'
- 1-2 Gonzalo de los Santos 32'
- 1-3 Fernando Torres 34'
- 2-3 Joseba Arriaga 52'
- 2-4 Fernando Torres 83'
- 3-4 Joseba Arriaga 87'

== Statistics ==
=== Top scorers ===
Rank	Position	Number	Player	La Liga	Copa del Rey	Total
1	FW	9	(Spain) Fernando Torres	19	2	21
2	MF	20	(Serbia and Montenegro) Veljko Paunović	6	1	7
3	FW	21	(Greece) Demis Nikolaidis	6	0	6
4	DF	17	(Spain) Nano	5	0	5
5	MF	3	(Uruguay) Gonzalo de los Santos	3	0	3
5	MF	8	(Netherlands) Kiki Musampa	2	1	3
7	MF	10	(Spain) Jorge Larena	2	0	2
7	MF	14	(Argentina) Diego Simeone	2	0	2
7	DF	16	(Argentina) Matías Lequi	2	0	2
7	MF	18	(Argentina) Ariel Ibagaza	2	0	2
7	MF	23	(Brazil) Rodrigo Fabri	0	2	2
12	DF	5	(Spain) García Calvo	1	0	1
12	MF	24	(Spain) Álvaro Novo	1	0	1
Own goals				0	0	0
Totals				51	6	57
