= 2004–05 Atlético Madrid season =

99th season in existence of Atlético Madrid

Atlético de Madrid
2004–05 season
- President: Enrique Cerezo
- Head coach: César Ferrando
- Stadium: Vicente Calderón
- La Liga: 11th
- Copa del Rey: Semi-finals
- UEFA Intertoto Cup: Final
- Top goalscorer: Fernando Torres (16)
Home colours	Away colours

The 2004–05 season was the 99th season in Atlético Madrid's history and their 68rd season in La Liga, the top division of Spanish football. It covers a period from 1 July 2004 to 30 June 2005. Despite Fernando Torres continuing to score more than a dozen goals per season, consolidating his status as Spain's top young striker, Atlético were only able to score 40 league goals. That rendered the successful defence of Luis Perea and Pablo Ibáñez vital just to keep the club in mid-table.

== Squad ==
=== Goalkeepers ===
- (Argentina) Leo Franco
- (Spain) Sergio
- (Spain) Iván Cuéllar

=== Defenders ===
- (Spain) Juan Velasco
- (Spain) Antonio López
- (Spain) García Calvo
- (Spain) Santi
- (Spain) Sergi
- (Colombia) Luis Perea
- (Spain) Pablo Ibáñez
- (Spain) Francisco Molinero
- (Spain) Pablo Sicilia

=== Midfielders ===
- (Spain) Gonzalo Colsa
- (Uruguay) Marcelo Sosa
- (Netherlands) Kiki Musampa
- (Spain) Jorge Larena
- (Argentina) Diego Simeone
- (Spain) Carlos Aguilera
- (Spain) Nano
- (Argentina) Ariel Ibagaza
- (Denmark) Jesper Grønkjær
- (France) Peter Luccin
- (Spain) Raúl Medina

=== Attackers ===
- (Serbia and Montenegro) Veljko Paunović
- (Uruguay) Richard Núñez
- (Spain) Fernando Torres
- (Spain) Salva
- (Spain) Álvaro Novo
- (Spain) Braulio

=== Captain ===
- (Spain) Fernando Torres

== Competitions ==
=== La Liga ===
==== League table ====
Pos	Team	Pld	W	D	L	GF	GA	GD	Pts	Qualification or relegation
9	Athletic Bilbao	38	14	9	15	59	54	+5	51 (Note: DEP: 8 pts; ATH: 4 pts → ATH 1–0 MLG; MLG: 4 pts → MLG 1–0 ATH)	Qualification for the Intertoto Cup second round
10	Málaga	38	15	6	17	40	48	−8	51	
11	Atlético Madrid	38	13	11	14	40	34	+6	50 (Note: ATM 1–1 ZAR; ZAR 0–0 ATM)	
12	Zaragoza	38	14	8	16	52	57	−5	50	
13	Getafe	38	12	11	15	38	46	−8	47 (Note: RSO 1–1 GET; GET 2–0 RSO)	

Source: LFP
Rules for classification: 1st points; 2nd head-to-head points; 3rd head-to-head goal difference; 4th head-to-head goals scored; 5th goal difference; 6th number of goals scored; 7th Fair-play points

==== Matches ====
- Atlético Madrid–Málaga 2-0
- 1-0 Juan Calatayud 45' (o.g.)
- 2-0 Fernando Torres 48'
- Albacete–Atlético Madrid 0-2
- 0-1 Fernando Torres 85'
- 0-2 Ariel Ibagaza 90'
- Atlético Madrid–Barcelona 1-1
- 0-1 Giovanni van Bronckhorst 21'
- 1-1 Fernando Torres 48'
- Levante–Atlético Madrid 1-0
- 1-0 Alberto Rivera 20' (pen.)
- Atlético Madrid–Villarreal 1-0
- 1-0 Salva 41'
- Real Sociedad–Atlético Madrid 1-0
- 1-0 Darko Kovačević 41'
- Atlético Madrid–Racing Santander 1-0
- 1-0 Fernando Torres 7'
- Sevilla–Atlético Madrid 2-1
- 1-0 Aitor Ocio 10'
- 2-0 Júlio Baptista 52'
- 2-1 Pablo Ibáñez 90'
- Valencia–Atlético Madrid 1-1
- 1-0 Angulo 64'
- 1-1 Fernando Torres 78'
- Atlético Madrid–Real Zaragoza 1-1
- 0-1 Sávio 2'
- 1-1 Salva 83'
- Mallorca–Atlético Madrid 1-1
- 1-0 Juan Arango 26'
- 1-1 Gonzalo Colsa 83'
- Atlético Madrid–Numancia 2-0
- 1-0 Pablo Ibáñez 51'
- 2-0 Fernando Torres 77'
- Espanyol–Atlético Madrid 2-1
- 1-0 Dani 52' (pen.)
- 1-1 Nano 54'
- 2-1 Dani 74'
- Atlético Madrid–Osasuna 3-2
- 1-0 Fernando Torres 15'
- 2-0 Salva 30'
- 2-1 Valdo 44'
- 3-1 Gonzalo Colsa 54'
- 3-2 Richard Morales 74'
- Athletic Bilbao–Atlético Madrid 1-0
- 1-0 Asier Del Horno 45'
- Atlético Madrid–Deportivo 1-0
- 1-0 Antonio López 28'
- Betis–Atlético Madrid 1-0
- 1-0 Joaquín 7'
- Atlético Madrid–Real Madrid 0-3
- 0-1 Ronaldo 14'
- 0-2 Santiago Solari 81'
- 0-3 Ronaldo 83'
- Getafe–Atlético Madrid 1-1
- 0-1 Jorge Larena 35'
- 1-1 Sergio Pachón 64'
- Málaga–Atlético Madrid 1-0
- 1-0 Juan Rodríguez 81'
- Atlético Madrid–Albacete 3-1
- 0-1 Francisco 11'
- 1-1 Fernando Torres 20'
- 2-1 Ariel Ibagaza 29'
- 3-1 Pablo Ibáñez 44'
- Barcelona–Atlético Madrid 0-2
- 0-1 Fernando Torres 1'
- 0-2 Fernando Torres 90' (pen.)
- Atlético Madrid–Levante 0-0
- Villarreal–Atlético Madrid 3-2
- 0-1 Fernando Torres 27'
- 0-2 Fernando Torres 40'
- 1-2 Diego Forlán 63'
- 2-2 Luis Perea 82' (o.g.)
- 3-2 Juan Pablo Sorín 90'
- Atlético Madrid–Real Sociedad 1-0
- 1-0 Antonio López 25'
- Racing Santander–Atlético Madrid 2-1
- 0-1 Fernando Torres 11' (pen.)
- 1-1 Mario Regueiro 38'
- 2-1 David Aganzo 51'
- Atlético Madrid–Sevilla 3-0
- 1-0 Salva 16'
- 2-0 Fernando Torres 37'
- 3-0 Antonio López 42'
- Atlético Madrid–Valencia 1-0
- 1-0 Fernando Torres 14'
- Real Zaragoza–Atlético Madrid 0-0
- Atlético Madrid–Mallorca 4-0
- 1-0 Gonzalo Colsa 27'
- 2-0 Fernando Torres 60' (pen.)
- 3-0 Salva 86'
- 4-0 Salva 88'
- Numancia–Atlético Madrid 1-0
- 1-0 Toché 86'
- Atlético Madrid–Espanyol 0-0
- Osasuna–Atlético Madrid 1-0
- 1-0 John Aloisi 3'
- Atlético Madrid–Athletic Bilbao 1-1
- 0-1 Joseba Etxeberría 66'
- 1-1 Gonzalo Colsa 78'
- Deportivo–Atlético Madrid 2-0
- 1-0 Peter Luccin 54' (o.g.)
- 2-0 Joan Capdevila 82'
- Atlético Madrid–Betis 1-2
- 0-1 Ricardo Oliveira 16'
- 0-2 Ricardo Oliveira 37' (pen.)
- 1-2 Melli 54' (o.g.)
- Real Madrid–Atlético Madrid 0-0
- Atlético Madrid–Getafe 2-2
- 0-1 David Cubillo 21' (pen.)
- 1-1 Richard Núñez 47'
- 1-2 Gheorghe Craioveanu 56'
- 2-2 Richard Núñez 90'

== Statistics ==
=== Top scorers ===
Rank	Position	Number	Player	La Liga	Copa del Rey	Intertoto Cup	Total
1	FW	9	(Spain) Fernando Torres	16	2	2	20
2	FW	19	(Spain) Salva Ballesta	6	1	0	7
3	DF	3	(Spain) Antonio López	3	1	0	4
3	MF	4	(Spain) Gonzalo Colsa	4	0	0	4
3	MF	18	(Argentina) Ariel Ibagaza	2	0	2	4
3	DF	22	(Spain) Pablo Ibáñez	3	1	0	4
7	FW	28	(Spain) Braulio	0	3	0	3
8	DF	5	(Spain) García Calvo	0	1	1	2
8	FW	8	(Uruguay) Richard Núñez	2	0	0	2
8	MF	20	(Serbia and Montenegro) Veljko Paunović^{1}	0	0	2	2
11	MF	8	(Netherlands) Kiki Musampa^{1}	0	0	1	1
11	MF	10	(Spain) Jorge Larena	1	0	0	1
11	MF	14	(Argentina) Diego Simeone^{1}	0	0	1	1
11	DF	15	(Spain) Aguilera	0	0	1	1
11	DF	17	(Spain) Nano	0	1	0	1
11	MF	24	(Spain) Álvaro Novo	0	0	1	1
Own goals				3	0	0	3
Totals				40	10	11	61

^{1}Player left the club during the season.
