= 2008–09 Atlético Madrid season =

103rd season in existence of Atlético Madrid

Atlético Madrid
2008–09 season
- President: Enrique Cerezo
- Head coach: Javier Aguirre (until 2 February 2009); Abel Resino (from 2 February 2009)
- Stadium: Vicente Calderón
- La Liga: 4th
- Copa del Rey: Round of 16
- UEFA Champions League: Round of 16
- Top goalscorer: League: Diego Forlán (32); All: Diego Forlán (35)
Home colours	Away colours

The 2008–09 season was the 103rd season in Atlético Madrid's history and their 72nd season in La Liga, the top division of Spanish football. It covers a period from 1 July 2008 to 30 June 2009.

In the league, Atlético repeated the 4th place of 2007–08, improving on the previous season by three points. Uruguayan striker Diego Forlán had a tremendous season, scoring 32 league goals, the highest number of La Liga goals for a single player in a decade.

== Squad ==
=== Goalkeepers ===
- (France) Grégory Coupet (1)
- (Argentina) Leo Franco (25)
- (Spain) Ángel Bernabé (27)

=== Defenders ===
- (Greece) Giourkas Seitaridis (2)
- (Spain) Antonio López (3)
- (Spain) Mariano Pernía (4)
- (Netherlands) John Heitinga (5)
- (Czech Republic) Tomáš Ujfaluši (17)
- (Colombia) Luis Perea (21)
- (Spain) Pablo Ibáñez (22)
- (Spain) Álvaro Domínguez (28)
- (Portugal) Zé Castro
- (Spain) Juan Valera

=== Midfielders ===
- (Spain) Raúl García (8)
- (Argentina) Maxi Rodríguez (C) (11)
- (Brazil) (Portugal) Paulo Assunção (12)
- (Argentina) Éver Banega (16)
- (Portugal) Maniche (18)
- (Spain) Miguel de las Cuevas (19)
- (Portugal) Simão (20)
- (Spain) Ignacio Camacho (24)
- (Spain) Keko (29/33 in UEFA Champions League)
- (Spain) José Manuel Jurado
- (Brazil) Cléber

=== Attackers ===
- (Uruguay) (Spain) Diego Forlán (7)
- (Spain) Luis García (9)
- (Argentina) Sergio Agüero (10)
- (France) Florent Sinama Pongolle (14)

== Competitions ==
=== La Liga ===
==== League table ====
Pos	Team	Pld	W	D	L	GF	GA	GD	Pts	Qualification or relegation
2	Real Madrid	38	25	3	10	83	52	+31	78	Qualification for the Champions League group stage
3	Sevilla	38	21	7	10	54	39	+15	70	Qualification for the Champions League group stage
4	Atlético Madrid	38	20	7	11	80	57	+23	67	Qualification for the Champions League play-off round
5	Villarreal	38	18	11	9	61	54	+7	65	Qualification for the Europa League play-off round
6	Valencia	38	18	8	12	68	54	+14	62	Qualification for the Europa League play-off round

Source: LFP and Yahoo! Sport
Rules for classification: 1) points; 2) head-to-head points; 3) head-to-head goal difference; 4) head-to-head goals scored; 5) goal difference; 6) number of goals scored.

==== Matches ====
- Atlético Madrid–Málaga 4-0
- 1-0 John Heitinga 26'
- 2-0 Diego Forlán 38'
- 3-0 Diego Forlán 43' (pen.)
- 4-0 Florent Sinama Pongolle 80'
- Valladolid–Atlético Madrid 2-1
- 1-0 Ángel Vivar Dorado 3'
- 2-0 Javier Baraja 28'
- 2-1 Sergio Agüero 54'
- Atlético Madrid–Recreativo Huelva 4-0
- 1-0 Sergio Agüero 7'
- 2-0 Maniche 52'
- 3-0 Florent Sinama Pongolle 78'
- 4-0 Florent Sinama Pongolle 88'
- Getafe–Atlético Madrid 1-2
- 0-1 Florent Sinama Pongolle 29'
- 1-1 Juan Ángel Albín 75'
- 1-2 David Cortés 82' (o.g.)
- Atlético Madrid–Sevilla 0-1
- 0-1 Luís Fabiano 21'
- Barcelona–Atlético Madrid 6-1
- 1-0 Rafael Márquez 3'
- 2-0 Samuel Eto'o 5'
- 3-0 Lionel Messi 9'
- 3-1 Maxi Rodríguez 13'
- 4-1 Samuel Eto'o 18'
- 5-1 Eiður Guðjohnsen 28'
- 6-1 Thierry Henry 73'
- Atlético Madrid–Real Madrid 1-2
- 0-1 Ruud van Nistelrooy 1'
- 0-2 Gonzalo Higuaín 90' (pen.)
- 1-2 Simão 90'
- Villarreal–Atlético Madrid 4-4
- 0-1 Simão 1'
- 0-2 Diego Forlán 22'
- 1-2 Marcos Senna 47'
- 2-2 Joseba Llorente 51'
- 3-2 Gonzalo Rodríguez 57'
- 4-2 Giuseppe Rossi 67'
- 4-3 Simão 83'
- 4-4 Raúl García 85'
- Atlético Madrid–Mallorca 2-0
- 1-0 Sergio Agüero 13'
- 2-0 Sergio Agüero 27'
- Osasuna–Atlético Madrid 0-0
- Atlético Madrid–Deportivo 4-1
- 1-0 John Heitinga 26'
- 2-0 Diego Forlán 51'
- 3-0 Maxi Rodríguez 66'
- 4-0 Diego Forlán 80'
- 4-1 Filipe Luís 86'
- Numancia–Atlético Madrid 1-1
- 0-1 Diego Forlán 35'
- 1-1 José Barkero 90' (pen.)
- Atlético Madrid–Racing Santander 4-1
- 0-1 Mohammed Tchité 7'
- 1-1 Simão 21'
- 2-1 Sergio Agüero 34'
- 3-1 Diego Forlán 78'
- 4-1 Diego Forlán 81'
- Sporting Gijón–Atlético Madrid 2-5
- 1-0 Mate Bilić 4'
- 1-1 Sergio Agüero 5'
- 1-2 Sergio Agüero 41'
- 1-3 Diego Forlán 55'
- 2-3 David Barral 60'
- 2-4 Maxi Rodríguez 72'
- 2-5 Diego Forlán 80'
- Atlético Madrid–Betis 2-0
- 1-0 Maxi Rodríguez 20'
- 2-0 Sergio Agüero 81'
- Espanyol–Atlético Madrid 2-3
- 0-1 Maxi Rodríguez 7'
- 1-1 Sergio Sánchez 58'
- 1-2 Sergio Agüero 81'
- 1-3 Maxi Rodríguez 90'
- 2-3 Valdo 90'
- Valencia–Atlético Madrid 3-1
- 1-0 David Villa 33' (pen.)
- 2-0 David Silva 39'
- 2-1 Diego Forlán 45' (pen.)
- 3-1 David Silva 68'
- Atlético Madrid–Athletic Bilbao 2-3
- 1-0 Antonio López 15'
- 1-1 Koikili 45'
- 1-2 Fernando Llorente 50'
- 1-3 Fernando Llorente 66'
- 2-3 Diego Forlán 90'
- Almería–Atlético Madrid 1-1
- 1-0 Kalu Uche 6'
- 1-1 Florent Sinama Pongolle 22'
- Málaga–Atlético Madrid 1-1
- 1-0 Apoño 22'
- 1-1 John Heitinga 44'
- Atlético Madrid–Valladolid 1-2
- 0-1 Luis Prieto 50'
- 1-1 José García Calvo 56' (o.g.)
- 1-2 Víctor 78'
- Recreativo Huelva–Atlético Madrid 0-3
- 0-1 Sergio Agüero 3'
- 0-2 Diego Forlán 28'
- 0-3 Diego Forlán 35'
- Atlético Madrid–Getafe 1-1
- 1-0 Diego Forlán 33'
- 1-1 Juan Ángel Albín 88'
- Sevilla–Atlético Madrid 1-0
- 1-0 Jesús Navas 87'
- Atlético Madrid–Barcelona 4-3
- 0-1 Thierry Henry 19'
- 0-2 Lionel Messi 33'
- 1-2 Diego Forlán 32'
- 2-2 Sergio Agüero 56'
- 2-3 Thierry Henry 73'
- 3-3 Diego Forlán 80' (pen.)
- 4-3 Sergio Agüero 89'
- Real Madrid–Atlético Madrid 1-1
- 0-1 Diego Forlán 38'
- 1-1 Klaas-Jan Huntelaar 57'
- Atlético Madrid–Villarreal 3-2
- 0-1 Matías Fernández 19'
- 0-2 Cani 52'
- 1-2 Sergio Agüero 53'
- 2-2 Diego Forlán 81'
- 3-2 Antonio López 83'
- Mallorca–Atlético Madrid 2-0
- 1-0 Aritz Aduriz 24'
- 2-0 Chory Castro 90'
- Atlético Madrid–Osasuna 2-4
- 0-1 Walter Pandiani 8'
- 1-1 Diego Forlán 15'
- 1-2 Krisztián Vadócz 44'
- 1-3 Walter Pandiani 48'
- 1-4 Masoud Shojaei 69'
- 2-4 Pablo Ibáñez 74'
- Deportivo–Atlético Madrid 1-2
- 0-1 Sergio Agüero 45'
- 0-2 Simão 70'
- 1-2 Rodolfo Bodipo 87'
- Atlético Madrid–Numancia 3-0
- 1-0 Éver Banega 62'
- 2-0 Diego Forlán 79'
- 3-0 Simão 90'
- Racing Santander–Atlético Madrid 5-1
- 1-0 Christian 9'
- 2-0 Ezequiel Garay 16'
- 3-0 Mohammed Tchité 38'
- 3-1 Diego Forlán 61' (pen.)
- 4-1 Pedro Munitis 65'
- 5-1 Nikola Žigić 87'
- Atlético Madrid–Sporting Gijón 3-1
- 1-0 Diego Forlán 27'
- 2-0 Simão 41'
- 3-0 Sergio Agüero 47'
- 3-1 Mate Bilić 48'
- Betis–Atlético Madrid 0-2
- 0-1 Diego Forlán 13'
- 0-2 Diego Forlán 89'
- Atlético Madrid–Espanyol 3-2
- 0-1 Nenê 39' (pen.)
- 0-2 Dani Jarque 40'
- 1-2 Diego Forlán 53'
- 2-2 Sergio Agüero 60'
- 3-2 Diego Forlán 90'
- Atlético Madrid–Valencia 1-0
- 1-0 Diego Forlán 30' (pen.)
- Athletic Bilbao–Atlético Madrid 1-4
- 0-1 Raúl García 59'
- 1-1 Xabier Etxeita 68'
- 1-2 Diego Forlán 73'
- 1-3 Diego Forlán 78'
- 1-4 Diego Forlán 87' (pen.)
- Atlético Madrid–Almería 3-0
- 1-0 Sergio Agüero 19'
- 2-0 Raúl García 27'
- 3-0 Diego Forlán 50'

== Top scorers ==
Rank	Position	Number	Player	La Liga	Copa del Rey	UEFA Champions League	Total
1	FW	7	(Uruguay) Diego Forlán	32	1	2	35
2	FW	10	(Argentina) Sergio Agüero	17	0	4	21
3	MF	11	(Argentina) Maxi Rodríguez	6	0	4	10
4	MF	20	(Portugal) Simão	7	0	2	9
5	FW	14	(France) Sinama Pongolle	5	1	0	6
6	MF	8	(Spain) Raúl García	3	0	1	4
7	DF	5	(Netherlands) John Heitinga	3	0	0	3
8	DF	3	(Spain) Antonio López	2	0	0	2
8	MF	18	(Portugal) Maniche	1	0	1	2
10	MF	9	(Spain) Luis García	0	0	1	1
10	MF	16	(Argentina) Éver Banega	1	0	0	1
10	DF	17	(Czech Republic) Tomáš Ujfaluši	0	1	0	1
10	DF	22	(Spain) Pablo Ibáñez	1	0	0	1
Own goals				2	0	0	2
Totals				80	3	15	98
