= Iván Romero =

Roberto Alarcón may refer to:

- Iván Romero (footballer, born 1980), Spanish football left-back
- Iván Romero (footballer, born 2001), Spanish football forward for Sevilla
