= Sergio Aragoneses =

Spanish footballer

Personal information
- Full name: Sergio Aragoneses Almeida
- Date of birth: 1 February 1977 (age 49)
- Place of birth: O Porriño, Spain
- Height: 1.82 m (6 ft 0 in)
- Position: Goalkeeper

Youth career
- 1994–1996: Celta

Senior career*
| Years | Team | Apps | (Gls) |
| 1996–1998 | Celta B | 40 | (0) |
| 1998–1999 | Sporting Guardés | | |
| 1999–2000 | Pontevedra | 37 | (0) |
| 2000–2003 | Tenerife | 77 | (0) |
| 2003 | Getafe | 21 | (0) |
| 2004–2005 | Atlético Madrid | 14 | (0) |
| 2005 | → Getafe (loan) | 11 | (0) |
| 2005–2006 | Elche | 16 | (0) |
| 2006–2008 | Hércules | 23 | (0) |
| 2008 | Numancia | 0 | (0) |
| 2008–2014 | Tenerife | 177 | (0) |
| 2014 | Cádiz | 11 | (0) |
| 2014–2015 | Marino | 22 | (0) |
| Total | | 449 | (0) |
- * Club domestic league appearances and goals

Sergio Aragoneses Almeida (born 1 February 1977) is a Spanish former professional footballer who played as a goalkeeper.

In a career mainly associated with Tenerife, he appeared in 180 Segunda División games over nine seasons. He added 87 matches in La Liga, also representing in the competition Atlético Madrid and Getafe.

== Club career ==
Aragoneses was born in O Porriño, Galicia. An unsuccessful product of RC Celta de Vigo's youth academy, he went on to represent lowly Sporting Guardés and Pontevedra CF, signing with CD Tenerife for the 2000–01 season and helping the Canary Islands club return to La Liga immediately.

Aragoneses made his top-flight debut in 2001–02 (in a 0–2 home loss against Deportivo Alavés), and went on to have unassuming spells at Madrid's Getafe CF and Atlético, with the latter loaning him to the former as well. He joined Segunda División side Elche CF ahead of 2005–06, being diagnosed with testicular cancer shortly after; he missed a great part of the campaign, but was still able to finish it.

After joining Hércules CF – also in the Valencian Community and in the second division – in summer 2006, Aragoneses was again diagnosed with the ailment, this time being forced to undergo chemotherapy. He eventually recovered completely, and returned to the team's lineup.

Aragoneses was suspended by coach Andoni Goikoetxea in early 2008, allegedly for claiming that the manager had made statements regarding his person of "very little class" after not playing him in a Copa del Rey tie against Athletic Bilbao. He was eventually released, later signing with CD Numancia who had lost first-choice Jacobo to a serious knee injury.

In July 2008, having made no official appearances for the Soria-based club, Aragoneses returned to Tenerife after a five-year absence. He quickly won the battle for first-choice with Luis García, but was later sidelined until the end of the season with a case of acute pancreatitis; he recovered fully once again, being the undisputed starter in 2009–10's top flight (all matches and minutes in an eventual relegation, only certified however in the last round).

On 27 January 2014, aged 37, Aragoneses agreed to a contract with Cádiz CF of Segunda División B.

== Personal life ==
Aragoneses' son, also named Sergio (born 2004), was also a goalkeeper.

== Career statistics ==
Appearances and goals by club, season and competition
| Club | Season | League | | | National cup | | Europe | | Other | | Total | |
| Club | Season | Division | Apps | Goals | Apps | Goals | Apps | Goals | Apps | Goals | Apps | Goals |
|---|---|---|---|---|---|---|---|---|---|---|---|---|
| Celta B | 1996–97 | Segunda Division B | 47 | 0 | — | | — | | — | | 47 | 0 |
| Pontevedra | 1999–2000 | Segunda División B | 37 | 0 | — | | — | | — | | 37 | 0 |
| Tenerife | 2000–01 | Segunda División | 33 | 0 | 0 | 0 | — | | — | | 33 | 0 |
| Tenerife | 2001–02 | La Liga | 24 | 0 | 1 | 0 | — | | — | | 25 | 0 |
| Tenerife | 2002–03 | Segunda División | 20 | 0 | 0 | 0 | — | | — | | 20 | 0 |
| Tenerife | Total | | 77 | 0 | 1 | 0 | — | | — | | 78 | 0 |
| Getafe | 2003–04 | Segunda División | 21 | 0 | 1 | 0 | — | | — | | 22 | 0 |
| Atlético Madrid | 2003–04 | La Liga | 14 | 0 | 1 | 0 | — | | — | | 15 | 0 |
| Atlético Madrid | 2004–05 | La Liga | 0 | 0 | 0 | 0 | 1 | 0 | — | | 1 | 0 |
| Atlético Madrid | Total | | 14 | 0 | 1 | 0 | 1 | 0 | — | | 16 | 0 |
| Getafe (loan) | 2004–05 | La Liga | 11 | 0 | 2 | 0 | | | — | | 13 | 0 |
| Elche | 2005–06 | Segunda División | 16 | 0 | — | | — | | — | | 16 | 0 |
| Hércules | 2006–07 | Segunda División | 23 | 0 | 2 | 0 | — | | — | | 25 | 0 |
| Hércules | 2007–08 | Segunda División | 0 | 0 | 1 | 0 | — | | — | | 1 | 0 |
| Hércules | Total | | 23 | 0 | 3 | 0 | — | | — | | 26 | 0 |
| Numancia | 2007–08 | Segunda División | 0 | 0 | — | | — | | — | | 0 | 0 |
| Tenerife | 2008–09 | Segunda División | 19 | 0 | 2 | 0 | — | | — | | 21 | 0 |
| Tenerife | 2009–10 | La Liga | 38 | 0 | 0 | 0 | — | | — | | 38 | 0 |
| Tenerife | 2010–11 | Segunda División | 39 | 0 | 1 | 0 | — | | — | | 40 | 0 |
| Tenerife | 2011–12 | Segunda División B | 36 | 0 | 1 | 0 | — | | 6 | 0 | 43 | 0 |
| Tenerife | 2012–13 | Segunda División B | 36 | 0 | 0 | 0 | — | | 2 | 0 | 38 | 0 |
| Tenerife | 2013–14 | Segunda División | 9 | 0 | 1 | 0 | — | | — | | 9 | 0 |
| Tenerife | Total | | 177 | 0 | 5 | 0 | — | | 8 | 0 | 190 | 0 |
| Cádiz | 2013–14 | Segunda División B | 11 | 0 | — | | — | | 2 | 0 | 13 | 0 |
| Marino | 2014–15 | Tercera División | 22 | 0 | — | | — | | — | | 22 | 0 |
| Career total | | | 449 | 0 | 13 | 0 | 1 | 0 | 10 | 0 | 473 | 0 |
