= Enrique Cerezo =

Spanish film producer (born 1948)

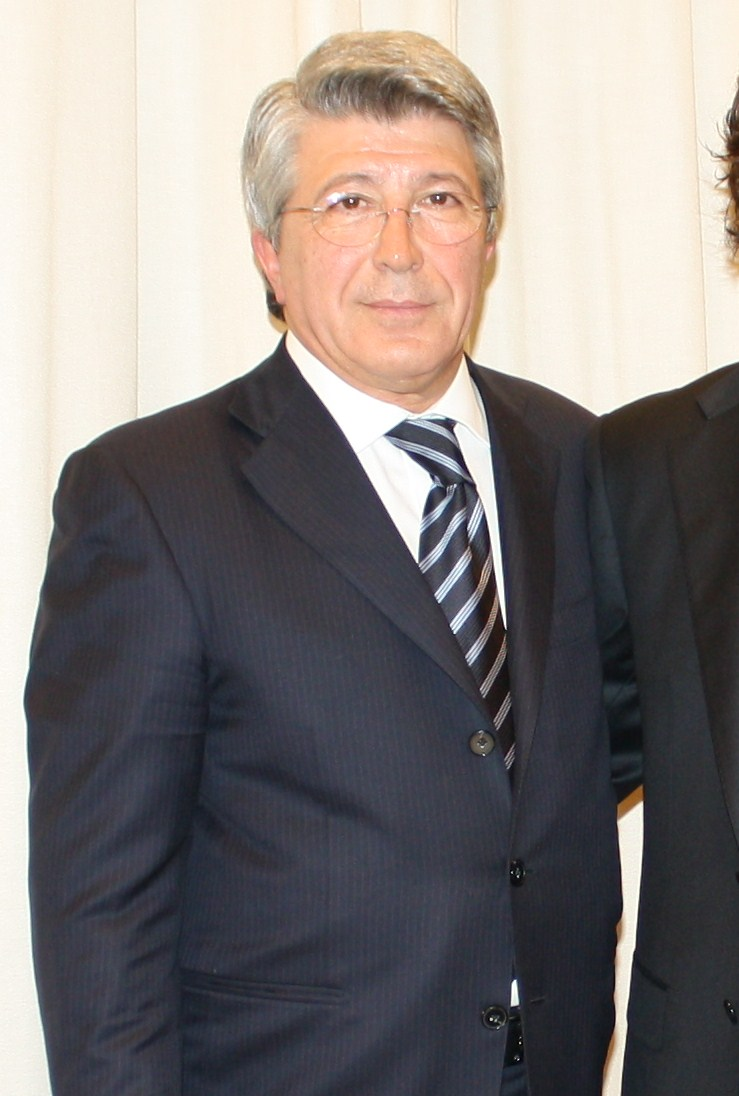
- Enrique Cerezo in 2009

29th president of Atlético de Madrid
- Incumbent
- Assumed office 28 May 2003
- Preceded by: Jesús Gil y Gil

President of EGEDA
- Incumbent
- Assumed office 12 September 1998

President of Canal 8 Madrid
- Incumbent
- Assumed office 12 August 2007

Personal details
- Born: 27 February 1948 (age 78) Madrid, Francoist Spain
- Children: 3
- Education: Universidad Politécnica de Madrid
- Occupation: Film producer; sports executive
- Awards: Medalla de Oro al Mérito en las Bellas Artes
- Website: www.enriquecerezo.com

Enrique Cerezo Torres ([enˈrike θeˈɾeθo]; born 27 February 1948) is a Spanish film producer and the current president of Atlético Madrid, a position he has held since 2002.

== Cinematographic career ==
Cerezo began in cinema in 1967 as a camera assistant in the movie Un millón en la basura. Three years later, he directed his first and only film, La sonrisa del sol: Almería.

After being involved as a producer in several films starting in the 1980s, he created his own production company (Enrique Cerezo P.C.) in the early 1990s. Some of produced films include El perro del hortelano, La buena estrella, Pídele cuentas al rey, Yoyes, Juana la Loca, La hora de los valientes and La vida de nadie.

In 2012 he was awarded at the X Festival Internacional de Cortometrajes 'Almería en corto' for the film La sonrisa del sol: Almería.

== Presidency of Atlético Madrid ==
After the promotion of Atlético Madrid to La Liga in 2002, Jesús Gil opted to leave the presidency of the organization, although his family continued to control it and decided to designate Enrique Cerezo as president, appreciating his collaboration with the club for many years.

In his first season, the club brought in several notable players, including Javi Moreno, Demetrio Albertini and Fabricio Coloccini coming from Milan. However, despite these signings, the team finished the season in 12th place.

In the 2003–04 season, the club sacked coach Luis Aragonés and replaced him with Gregorio Manzano. Great part of the deals of the previous season left the club, and in this year, players like Diego Simeone, Ariel Ibagaza and Matías Emanuel Lequi arrived. The club finished in seventh position, making it a poor season.

In the 2004–05 season, the club replaced their coach again, hiring César Ferrando and he aimed to renovate Los Rojiblancos. At that time, the club purchased central defenders Pablo Ibáñez and Luis Perea. Ferrando's plans did not materialize and the club finished 11th, again outside of European football.

In the 2005–06 season, veteran Carlos Bianchi was appointed by the club. Atlético made great investments by bringing stars like Martin Petrov, Maxi Rodríguez and Mateja Kežman. Nevertheless, however, the team did not produce good results and Bianchi was dismissed midway through the season, replaced by Pepe Murcia.

In the 2009–10 season, the arrival of head coach Quique Sánchez Flores saw a huge change of fortunes. Though they continued to lag somewhat in La Liga, finishing the year in ninth, they managed to get third place in the 2009–10 UEFA Champions League group stage, and subsequently entered the season's UEFA Europa League in the round of 32 and winning the Europa League title after beating English teams Liverpool in the semi-finals and eventually Fulham in the final. Diego Forlán scored twice, the second being an extra-time winner in the 116th minute, as Atlético Madrid won 2–1.

In the 2010–11 season, Atlético had a comparatively disappointing performance, finishing only seventh in La Liga and being eliminated in the quarter-finals of the Copa del Rey and the group stage of the 2010–11 UEFA Europa League. This ultimately led to the departure of manager Sánchez Flores before the conclusion of the season, who was replaced with ex-Sevilla manager Gregorio Manzano, and who secured the final Europa League place for Atlético. Manzano himself was replaced with Diego Simeone in December 2011 after a poor run of form in La Liga.

In the 2011–12 season, former player Diego Simeone led Atlético to their second Europa League title in the three years since its creation after they beat Athletic Bilbao 3–0 in the final on 9 May 2012 in Bucharest, with Radamel Falcao scoring twice and Diego once. Again, by winning the Europa League, they qualified for the 2012 UEFA Super Cup against Chelsea, winner of the previous season's Champions League, which was played in Monaco on 31 August 2012. Atlético won 4–1, including a hat-trick scored by Falcao in the first half. On 16 May 2013, Atlético beat Real Madrid 2–1 in the Copa del Rey final, in a tense match where both teams finished with ten men. This ended a 14-year and 25-match winless streak in the Madrid derby.

The 2012–13 season saw the club finish with three trophies in a little over a year. As the undefeated winners of their Champions League group against FC Zenit, FC Porto and Austria Wien, and later defeating AC Milano, FC Barcelona and Chelsea in the knock-out rounds, Atlético played their first Champions League final since 1974, in Lisbon's Estádio da Luz against city rivals Real Madrid. The match went into extra time and ended in a 4–1 loss. However, Atlético did have the consolation of winning La Liga for the first time since 1996, with Godín's headed equaliser against Barcelona on the last day of the season, a week before the Champions League final.

== Filmography ==
=== As producer ===
- Matusalén (2023)
- The Man from Rome (2022)
- 1898: Los últimos de Filipinas (2016)
- Manda huevos (2016)
- La historia de Jan (2016)
- Mi gran noche (2015)
- Witching and Bitching (2013)
- Con la pata quebrada (2013)
- Mañana podría estar muerto (2013)
- Dracula 3D (2012)
- La montaña rusa (2012)
- La daga de Rasputín (2011)
- La venganza de Ira Vamp (2010)
- Todos estamos invitados (2008)
- Las 13 rosas (2007)
- La carta esférica (2007)
- The Final Inquiry (2006)
- A golpes (2005)
- Desde que amanece apetece (2005)
- Otros días vendrán (2005)
- Mis estimadas víctimas (2005)
- El chocolate del loro (2004)
- Franky Banderas (2004)
- Tiempo de tormenta (2003)
- El oro de Moscú (2003)
- El vientre de Juliette (2003)
- La vida de nadie (2002)
- La soledad era esto (2002)
- Mad Love (2001)
- El lado oscuro del corazón 2 (2001)
- Antigua, My Life (2001)
- Aunque tú no lo sepas (2000)
- Me da igual (2000)
- Yoyes (2000)
- Manos a la obra (2000)
- Pídele cuentas al rey (1999)
- El celo (1999)
- Extraños (1999)
- The Long Kill (1999)
- La hora de los valientes (1998)
- Dollar for the Dead (1998)
- La vuelta de El Coyote (1998)
- Phantoms (1998)
- La herida luminosa (1997)
- Al límite (1997)
- La pistola de mi hermano (1997)
- La buena estrella (1997)
- The Dog in the Manger (1996)
- Death in Granada (1996)
- Adosados (1996)
- Sombras y luces: Cien años de cine español (1996)
- Brujas (1996)
- Tatiana, la muñeca rusa (1995)
- Así en el cielo como en la tierra (1995)
- Una casa en las afueras (1995)
- Cuernos de mujer (1995)
- las cosas del querer 2ª parte (1995)
- Sálvate si puedes (1995)
- Todo es mentira (1994)
- How to Be Miserable and Enjoy It (1994)
- El tío del saco y el inspector Lobatón (1993)
- Pelotazo nacional (1993)
- Tres palabras (1993)
- Tirano Banderas (1993)
- Intruso (1993)
- El amante bilingüe (1993)
- Aquí, el que no corre... vuela (1992)
- The Tunnel (1988)
- La boda del señor cura (1979)

=== As director ===
- La sonrisa del sol: Almería (1974)

=== As screenwriter ===
- Dracula 3D

=== As actor ===
- Torrente 4 (2011)
