= José Zahínos =

Spanish footballer

Personal information
- Full name: José Ignacio Zahínos Sánchez
- Date of birth: 1 December 1977 (age 48)
- Place of birth: Madrid, Spain
- Height: 1.85 m (6 ft 1 in)
- Position: Defensive midfielder

Youth career
- Parla Escuela
- Parla

Senior career*
Years	Team	Apps	(Gls)
?–1999	Yuncos		
1999–2003	Atlético Madrid B	40	(5)
2000–2007	Atlético Madrid	20	(1)
2001	→ Universidad LP (loan)	9	(1)
2001–2002	→ Jaén (loan)	16	(1)
2003–2004	→ Elche (loan)	6	(1)
2007	→ Albacete (loan)	15	(1)
2007–2009	Recreativo	11	(0)
Total		117	(10)
- * Club domestic league appearances and goals

José Ignacio Zahínos Sánchez (born 1 December 1977) is a Spanish former footballer. Mainly a defensive midfielder, he was able to operate as a central defender.

The late bloomer's career was greatly hampered by injuries, as he only played an average of 11 matches in ten seasons as a professional.

== Club career ==
Born in Madrid, Zahínos' career began with CD Yuncos in the regional leagues. In 1999, following a successful trial at CP Amorós, he joined Atlético Madrid's reserves, and made two appearances for the first team in 2000–01's Segunda División.

Zahínos would feature rarely for Atlético due to several injuries, however, serving four loan stints in the second tier until June 2007 in the process. He made his La Liga debut on 29 May 2005, playing the last 16 minutes of a 2–2 home draw against Getafe CF. His only goal in the competition came on 30 October that year, when he opened the 1–1 draw with Villarreal CF also at the Vicente Calderón Stadium.

In 2007–08, Zahínos signed a two-year contract with top-tier club Recreativo de Huelva, but had his season cut short due to a serious knee injury, sustained in a 1–0 away win over CA Osasuna in April 2008. Due to this, he missed the entirety of the following campaign.

Zahínos retired shortly after, aged 31. He started working as a coach in Atlético Madrid's youth system.
