= Diego Simeone =

Argentine football manager and player (born 1970)

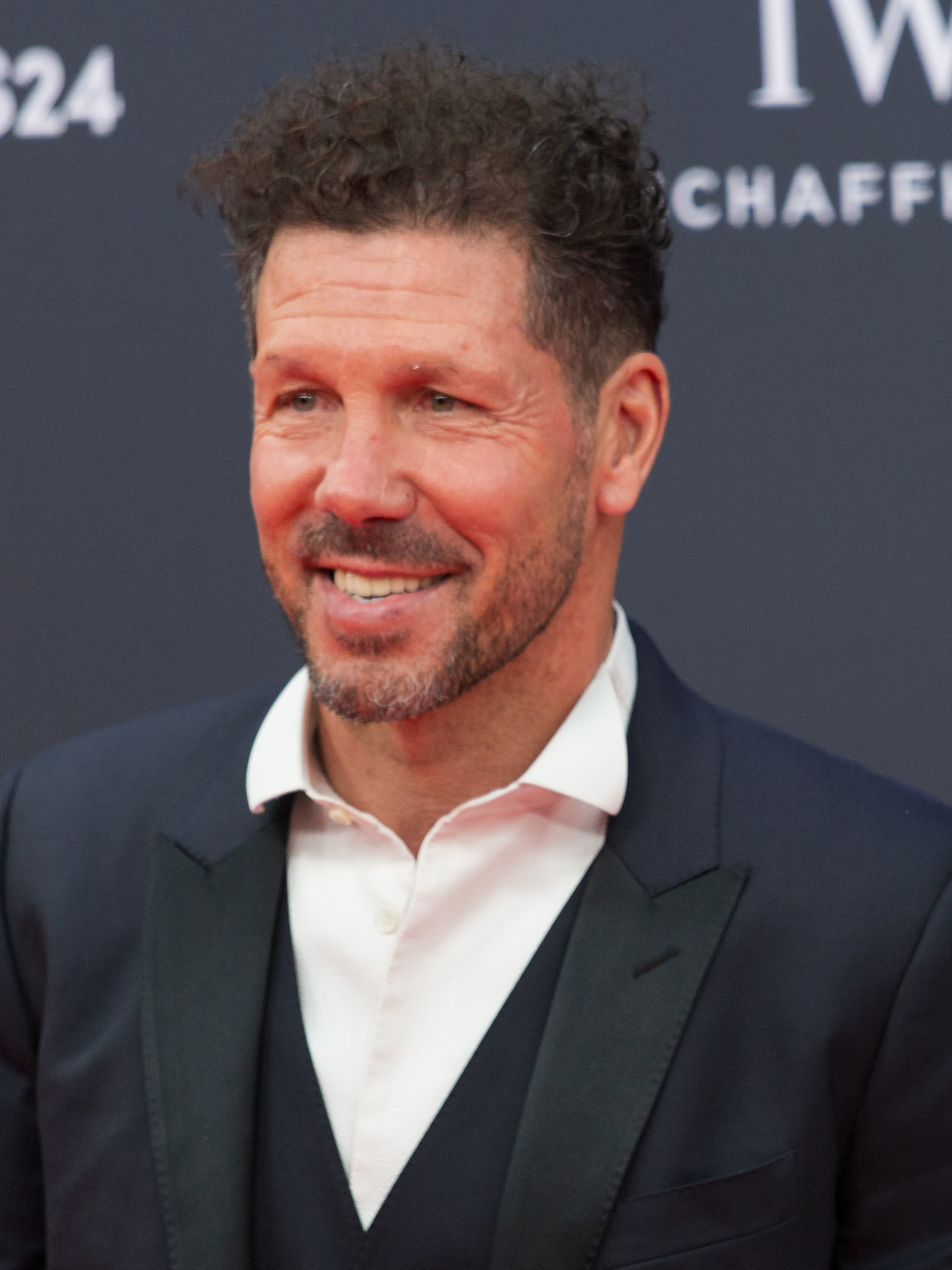
- Simeone in 2024

Personal information
- Full name: Diego Pablo Simeone González
- Date of birth: 28 April 1970 (age 56)
- Place of birth: Buenos Aires, Argentina
- Height: 1.77 m (5 ft 10 in)
- Position: Midfielder

Team information
- Current team: Atlético Madrid (manager)

Youth career
- Vélez Sársfield

Senior career*
Years	Team	Apps	(Gls)
1987–1990	Vélez Sársfield	76	(14)
1990–1992	Pisa	56	(6)
1992–1994	Sevilla	64	(12)
1994–1997	Atlético Madrid	98	(21)
1997–1999	Inter Milan	57	(11)
1999–2003	Lazio	90	(15)
2003–2005	Atlético Madrid	36	(2)
2005–2006	Racing Club	38	(3)
Total		515	(84)

International career
1989	Argentina U20	4	(1)
1996	Argentina U23	6	(1)
1988–2002	Argentina	106	(11)

Managerial career
- 2006: Racing Club
- 2006–2007: Estudiantes
- 2007–2008: River Plate
- 2009–2010: San Lorenzo
- 2011: Catania
- 2011: Racing Club
- 2011–: Atlético Madrid
Medal record
Men's football
Representing Argentina
Copa América
Winner	1991 Chile
Winner	1993 Ecuador
FIFA Confederations Cup
Winner	1992 Saudi Arabia
CONMEBOL–UEFA Cup of Champions
Winner	1993 Argentina
Olympic Games
Silver medal – second place	1996 Atlanta	Team
- * Club domestic league appearances and goals

Diego Pablo Simeone González (Spanish pronunciation: [ˈdjeɣo ˈpaβlo simeˈone]; Italian: [ˈdjɛːɡo simeˈoːne, ˈdjeː-]; born 28 April 1970), nicknamed "Cholo" ([ˈtʃolo]), is an Argentine professional football manager and former player who is the head coach of La Liga club Atlético Madrid since 2011. This makes him the second longest serving professional manager in Europe behind Frank Schmidt, but the longest serving professional manager in Europe in the top-division of their country.

In his club career as a midfielder that started in 1987, Simeone played in Argentina, Italy, and Spain for Vélez Sarsfield, Pisa, Sevilla, Atlético Madrid, Inter Milan, Lazio and Racing Club. He won a domestic double with Atlético Madrid in 1996, and the UEFA Cup with Inter in 1998, also winning another domestic double with Lazio in 2000, as well as the 1999 UEFA Super Cup and the 2000 Supercoppa Italiana. Simeone was capped over 100 times for the Argentina national team and represented the country at the 1994, 1998, and 2002 FIFA World Cups, and in four editions of the Copa América, winning the tournament in 1991 and 1993. He also won the FIFA Confederations Cup in 1992, the 1993 Artemio Franchi Cup, and a silver medal at the 1996 Summer Olympic games.

As a manager, Simeone has coached Argentine sides Racing Club, Estudiantes, River Plate, San Lorenzo and Italian club Catania, before joining Spanish club Atlético Madrid in 2011. He won the Argentine Primera División both with Estudiantes and River Plate. Simeone has had his biggest managerial success with Atlético Madrid, turning the team into a competitor for the La Liga and breaking the Real Madrid–Barcelona duopoly. He has won La Liga twice, the Copa del Rey, two UEFA Europa Leagues, two UEFA Super Cups, as well as being runner-up of the UEFA Champions League twice. Simeone is the longest-serving manager in La Liga, having stayed for well over a decade at Atlético. He won Atléti their first derby against arch-rivals Real Madrid in fourteen years in the 2013 Copa del Rey final at the Bernabeu.

== Club career ==
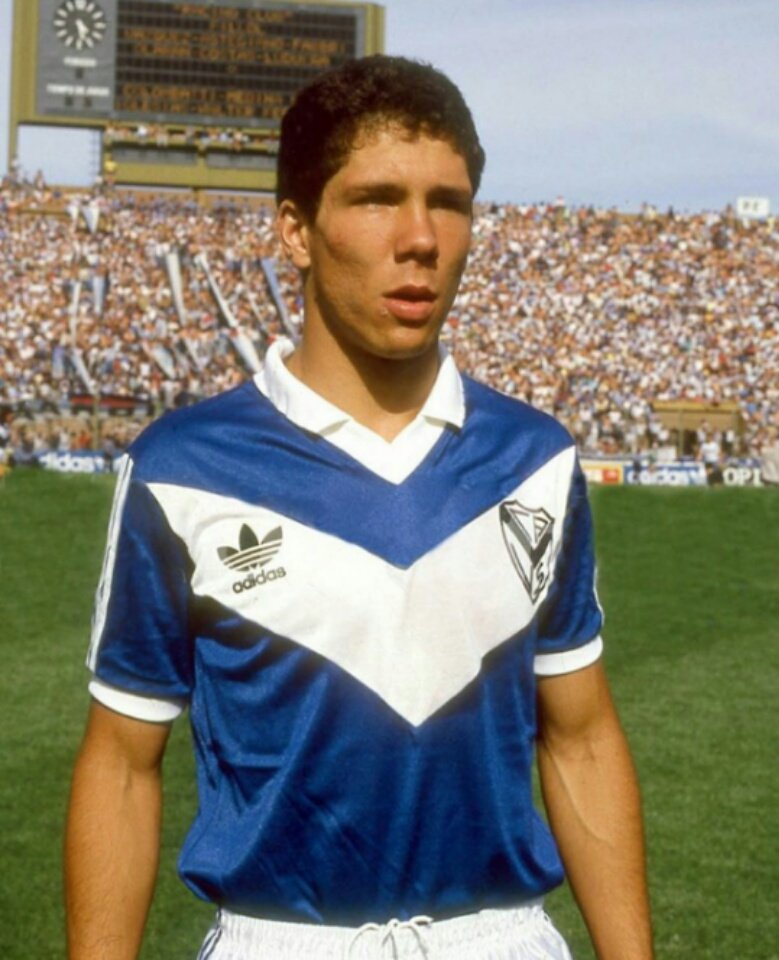
Simeone with Vélez Sarsfield in 1987

When Simeone was 14, his youth coach Victorio Spinetto nicknamed him "Cholo", as his energetic play reminded him of former Boca Juniors player and Argentine international Carmelo Simeone (no relation) who possessed the nickname.

After starting his career with Vélez Sarsfield, Simeone moved to Pisa in 1990. The club was relegated from Serie A in his first season and, after it failed to gain promotion the following year, Simeone was sold to La Liga club Sevilla. Simeone played two seasons in Seville, after which he was signed by Atlético Madrid. At Atlético, he was part of the team which won the double of the Liga title and Copa del Rey during the 1995–96 season, serving as the club's captain.

In 1997, Simeone returned to Serie A with Inter Milan, and played two full seasons, winning the 1997–98 UEFA Cup in a side spearheaded by Ronaldo up front. In 1999, Simeone joined fellow Argentines Néstor Sensini, Matías Almeyda and Juan Sebastián Verón at Sven-Göran Eriksson's Lazio. The side had gone close to the Scudetto in the season before Simeone's arrival and he helped deliver the championship after a season, where Juventus led the standings by two points going into the last day. A Juve loss at rainy Perugia coupled with Lazio's comfortable 3–0 home win over Reggina at the Stadio Olimpico ensured Simeone's first Serie A title. After winning the double in Spain, he would then add the Italian double as Lazio edged out Inter to claim the 1999–2000 Coppa Italia.

He went on to play three more seasons in Rome, which included more last day drama as Simeone's goal against former club Inter on the last day of the 2001–02 campaign effectively ruined his old employers' title dream.

After cancelling his contract with Lazio, Simeone returned to Atlético Madrid in 2003, spending his next two seasons there. In total, he played in 165 matches for Atlético, scoring 31 goals. In December 2004, it was confirmed that he would leave Europe and return to Argentina to finish his playing career with Racing Club.

== International career ==
In 1992, Simeone represented the Argentina under-23 team at the 1992 CONMEBOL Pre-Olympic Tournament in Paraguay, which saw Argentina fail to qualify for the 1992 Summer Olympics.

For the Argentina senior team, Simeone amassed 106 caps, the first coming in 1988 in a 4–1 defeat to Australia. He is the first footballer to earn 100 international caps for Argentina, with his century of appearances coming in a match against Venezuela in March 2002.

Although he was left out of the Argentina squad that finished in second place at the 1990 FIFA World Cup, Simeone later won the 1991 and 1993 editions of the Copa América with Argentina. He played in the 1994, 1998, and 2002 FIFA World Cups, captaining the team at the 1998 World Cup. He was also part of the 1995 and 1999 Copa América Argentina squads, as well as the Argentina under-23 squad that won the silver medal at the 1996 Summer Olympics in Atlanta, as one of the three overage players allowed per squad. As a midfielder, Simeone scored 11 goals for his country, including one in the 3–1 final victory over Saudi Arabia in the 1992 FIFA Confederations Cup. He also won the 1993 Artemio Franchi Cup over Denmark 5–4 on penalties following a 1–1 draw, netting Argentina's third spot kick.

He featured in midfield in Argentina's second round tie against Romania at the 1994 World Cup, contributing to Abel Balbo's goal, who scored from the rebound after Simeone's shot had been saved, although he could not prevent Argentina from being eliminated from the competition following a surprise 3–2 defeat. During the round of 16 of the 1998 World Cup, England's David Beckham was sent off for kicking Simeone in retaliation for a foul (see also Argentina–England football rivalry); Argentina won the match on penalties. Simeone later said he simulated the injury from the kick in order to get Beckham sent off. Sports Illustrated was critical of the Argentinian's theatrics in that incident, stating Simeone first delivered a "heavy-handed challenge" on Beckham and then "fell like a ton of bricks" when Beckham retaliated. In the following round, against the Netherlands, Simeone was injured by a tackle from Arthur Numan during his team's late 2–1 defeat. In the 2002 World Cup, his last, Argentina was eliminated in the group stage, which included a 1–0 loss to England in which Beckham converted a penalty.

Simeone said in 2002 that he was "embarrassed" at having surpassed Diego Maradona as Argentina's most capped player, though Simeone has since been surpassed by Roberto Ayala, Javier Mascherano, Javier Zanetti, Ángel Di María, Nicolás Otamendi and Lionel Messi.

== Style of play ==
Simeone was regarded as a tenacious, versatile, hard-working and complete two-way midfielder who was mobile, good in the air, and capable both of winning balls and starting attacking plays, while also having a penchant for scoring several goals himself. This enabled him to play anywhere in midfield throughout his career, although he was usually deployed in the centre in a box-to-box or defensive midfield role. He was also used in an attacking midfield role on occasion, even if it was not his optimal playing position, due to his ability to get forward, in addition to assisting his team defensively. During the 1998 World Cup, he was also deployed as a left-sided wing-back in the round-of-16 match against England. A talented yet combative player, he was primarily known for his leadership, tactical versatility, intelligence, strength and stamina, although he was also praised by pundits for his technique, vision and passing range. Simeone once described his hard-tackling playing style as "holding a knife between his teeth", and likening himself to a "warrior, a fighter who aims to give everything". His main inspirations as a player were Brazilian midfielder Falcão and German midfielder Lothar Matthäus.

== Managerial career ==
=== Early years ===
Simeone ended his playing career for Racing Club, playing his last match on 17 February 2006, and then became manager for the same team. After a rough start, the team made an impressive finish in the 2006 Clausura. When a new club president was elected, Simeone left Racing in May 2006 and was replaced by Reinaldo Merlo.

On 18 May, Simeone became head coach of Estudiantes and soon led them to their first league title in 23 years after defeating Boca Juniors 2–1 in a final match played on 13 December 2006. In an October 2006 poll in the sports daily Olé, Simeone was voted as the best manager in the Argentine league. He was also praised as a "born manager" by former Argentine international Roberto Perfumo. Simeone left Estudiantes after the end of the 2007 Apertura, where Estudiantes was not a contender after a poor start, but had a strong finish of nine games without defeat. On 15 December 2007, Simeone was unveiled as the new River Plate coach, succeeding Daniel Passarella. The contract was reported to be for one year, starting on 3 January 2008. After an early elimination in the Copa Libertadores, losing to San Lorenzo in the second round, Simeone and River Plate went on to win the 2008 Clausura championship after beating Olimpo 2–1 in the Monumental. On 7 November 2008, Simeone announced his resignation as coach of River Plate after their elimination in the quarter-finals of the 2008 Copa Sudamericana by Mexican side Chivas and a poor run of form of 11 domestic matches without a win, which left them bottom of the Primera División Argentina with only six matches remaining. On 15 April 2009, Simeone joined San Lorenzo to replace Miguel Ángel Russo following the club's exit in the first round of the 2009 Copa Libertadores. On 3 April 2010, Simeone resigned from San Lorenzo due to poor results and mounting criticism.

=== Catania and Racing Club ===
On 19 January 2011, Simeone flew to Sicily to join Serie A side Catania, replacing Marco Giampaolo, who left the club just hours earlier. On 1 June 2011, Simeone left his post after helping Catania stave off relegation. On 21 June 2011, Simeone was named as the new coach of Racing Club for a second spell in charge, replacing Miguel Ángel Russo, who had resigned the week prior.

=== Atlético Madrid ===
==== 2011–13: Europa League and Copa del Rey triumphs ====
On 23 December 2011, Simeone was unveiled as the new Atlético Madrid coach, succeeding Gregorio Manzano, who had been dismissed the day before following defeat to third-tier Albacete in the Copa del Rey. His first game as Atlético manager was a 0–0 away draw against Manuel Pellegrini's Malaga. His first season ended with the team winning the UEFA Europa League by beating Athletic Bilbao 3–0 in the final in Bucharest.

On 31 August 2012, his Atlético side won the UEFA Super Cup after defeating Chelsea 4–1 at the Stade Louis II in Monaco. In the domestic league, the team made an impressive start to the season, finishing the first half in second place, behind only Barcelona and above city rivals Real Madrid. Eventually, Simeone led the team to a third-place finish in the league, which at the time was the best finish in 17 years for Atlético. On 17 May 2013, he won the Copa del Rey after Atlético defeated rivals Real Madrid 2–1 at the Santiago Bernabéu.

==== 2013–17: La Liga win and Champions League finals ====
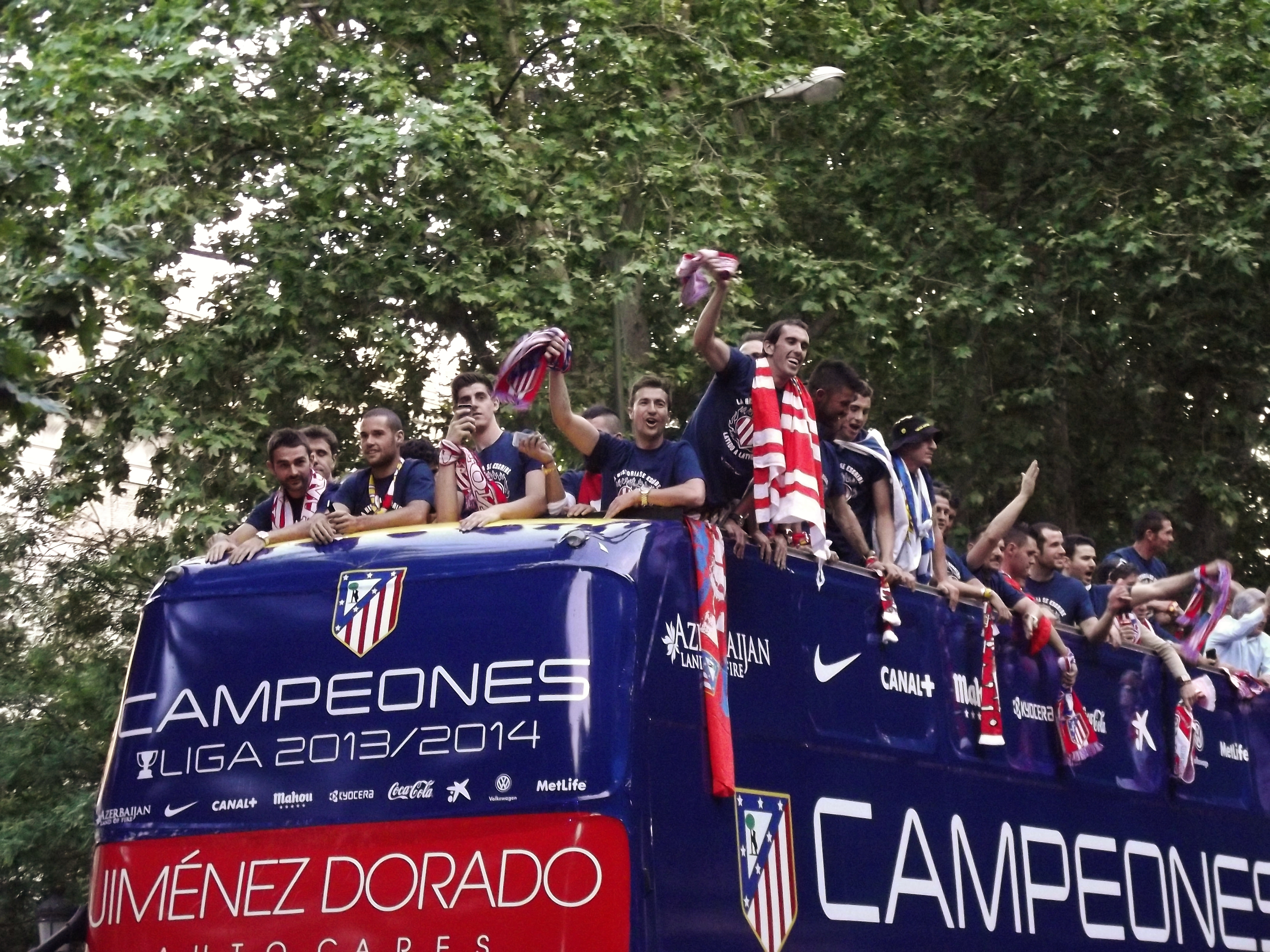
Atlético Madrid celebrates after winning the 2013–14 La Liga. Simeone can be seen in the back of the photo.

Atlético began the 2013–14 season with a similar squad to their prior season, despite selling star player Radamel Falcao to Monaco for a reported €60 million fee. They also acquired David Villa from Barcelona on a free transfer. While the season began with a defeat to Barça in the 2013 Supercopa de España, the team recorded eight-straight victories in La Liga, the best league start in club history. This included a 1–0 away win at the Santiago Bernabéu against Real Madrid, making Simeone the first Atlético manager since Claudio Ranieri in 1999 to record a league victory there. Atlético finished the first half of the season in first place in La Liga, level on points with Barcelona at 47. In the last round of the season, on 17 May, Atlético needed at least a draw in the Camp Nou against Barcelona to be crowned champions for the first time since 1996, while a loss would give the title to Barcelona. A Diego Godín header from a corner kick in the 48th minute gave Atlético an equaliser and the draw they needed to win their tenth league title and first since 1996, when Simeone himself was an Atlético player.

Simeone became the second Argentine manager after Helenio Herrera to hand Atlético a Spanish championship, and the second manager after Luis Aragonés to win it both as a player and as a coach of the team. Under Simeone, Atlético collected 90 points in La Liga, surpassing its 1996 record of 87, making the 2013–14 season the most successful in club history.

Also in 2013–14, Atlético finished top of their Champions League group and qualified for the quarter-finals with a 5–1 aggregate win over Milan in the round of 16. This was the first time they had reached the Champions League quarter-finals since 1996–97, when Simeone played for the team. In the quarter-finals, Atlético defeated Barcelona 2–1 on aggregate from Simeone's tactic of cutting the swift-passing midfield of Barcelona in two, thus denying them space and isolating Xavi and Andrés Iniesta from forwards Lionel Messi and Neymar. In the semi-finals, Atlético defeated José Mourinho's Chelsea 3–1 at Stamford Bridge following a goalless draw at home to reach the Champions League final for only the second time in club history, the first being in 1974. Atlético was the only undefeated team in the Champions League prior to the final, recording nine wins and three draws, and had the best defence in the competition, conceding only 6 goals in 12 matches.

In the final on 24 May 2014, Atlético faced city rivals Real Madrid at the Estádio da Luz in Lisbon. Despite leading from Diego Godín's header, Atlético conceded a late equaliser in the 93rd minute of the match. The goal hampered Atlético's morale, and the team ended up losing 4–1 after extra time, with Simeone losing the opportunity to be the third Argentine coach to win the Champions League, after Luis Carniglia and Helenio Herrera. After the final goal, Real Madrid's Raphaël Varane kicked the ball towards Simeone, causing Simeone to run onto the pitch in anger. He was sent to the stands, and Varane was booked for the incident. Reflecting, Simeone said, "I also made a mistake with my reaction. He's a young guy with a bright future." Simeone also admitted a mistake in selecting striker Diego Costa to start the match, as he had been recently injured and was forced off after eight minutes.

In the summer of 2014, Chelsea acquired Diego Costa, Filipe Luís and Thibaut Courtois from Atlético, and also David Villa moved to the MLS. In response, Atlético acquired striker Mario Mandžukić from Bayern Munich, goalkeeper Jan Oblak from Benfica and forwards Antoine Griezmann from Real Sociedad and Ángel Correa from San Lorenzo, and recovered young midfielder Saúl who was on loan at Rayo Vallecano. The season started with Atlético defeating city rivals Real Madrid for the Spanish Super Cup in August and repeating the previous year's victory in the Bernabéu for the league in September. In January, the team acquired Fernando Torres on loan from Milan. However, Atlético finished the league in third place and was eliminated in the UEFA Champions League quarter-finals by Real Madrid 1–0, on aggregate.

Before the start of the 2015–16 season, Filipe Luís returned from Chelsea with the team also acquiring Montenegrin defender Stefan Savić and Belgian midfielder Yannick Carrasco. Mario Mandžukić left for Juventus. In 2015–16, Atlético was the team with the best defensive record in Europe's "big five" leagues, only allowing 18 goals scored against them in 38 La Liga games. Atlético was also the team with the most clean sheets in their games. The team was contending the league title until the last fixture against Barcelona and Real Madrid, settling for third with 88 points.

In the UEFA Champions League, Simeone led Atlético to their second Champions League final in three seasons, becoming the first Argentine manager since Héctor Cúper to reach two Champions League finals. Atlético had defeated PSV on penalties during the round of 16, beat defending champions Barcelona 3–2 on aggregate and favourites Bayern Munich 2–2, going through on away goals, setting up a repeat of the 2014 final again facing Real Madrid. The match ended 1–1 after extra time leading to a penalty shootout. Juanfran was the only player to miss his kick, enabling Cristiano Ronaldo to score Real's last spot kick, condemning Atlético to a second Champions League final defeat in three seasons.

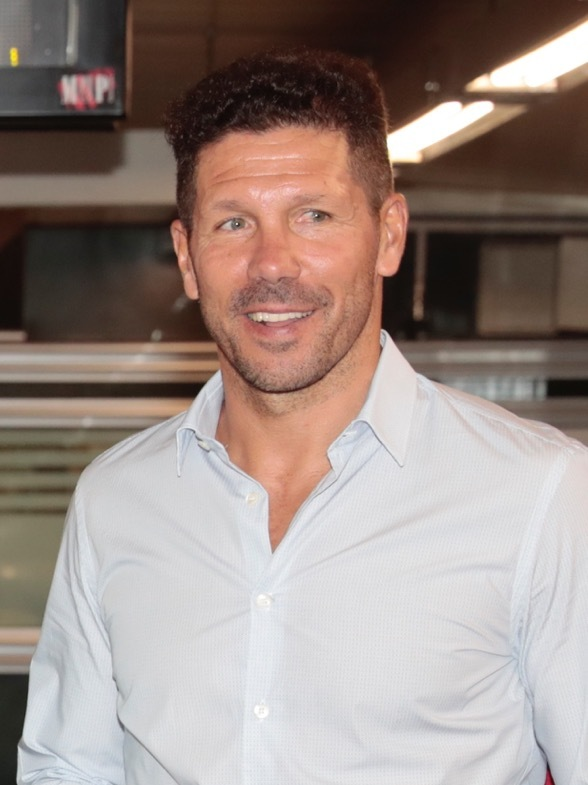
Simeone in 2017

In the summer of 2016, Atlético purchased forward Kevin Gameiro from Sevilla, midfielder Nicolás Gaitán from Benfica, and defender Šime Vrsaljko from Sassuolo. They also acquired the rights to Fernando Torres (previously on loan from Milan). The team again finished third in the league and lost in the UEFA Champions League semi-finals, again to Real Madrid.

==== 2017–21: Second Europa League and La Liga victories ====
On 5 September 2017, Simeone extended his contract with Atlético for two more years, until June 2020. In the 2017–18 season, Atlético would finish in second place in La Liga, behind Barcelona but ahead of city rivals Real Madrid.

In the 2017–18 UEFA Champions League group stage, Atlético did not advance and dropped to the 2017–18 UEFA Europa League. In January 2018, Diego Costa returned to Atlético from Chelsea. On 16 May 2018, the team won the 2018 UEFA Europa League Final against Marseille. Simeone was sent to the stands in the first leg of the semi-finals against Arsenal and was suspended. He was forced to watch the second leg and final from the stands.

In the 2018–19 season, Atlético bought Thomas Lemar from Monaco and Rodri from Villarreal, and in January 2019 acquired Álvaro Morata on loan from Chelsea, while longtime team captain Gabi signed for Qatari club Al-Sadd before the start of the season. They started the season by winning the 2018 UEFA Super Cup against arch-rivals, Real Madrid, winning 4-2 after extra time. The team again finished second in the league behind Barcelona and ahead of city rivals Real Madrid. In the Champions League, they advanced to the first knockout round, where they were eliminated by Juventus, winning the first leg 2–0 at the Wanda Metropolitano but losing the return leg 3–0 in Turin.

Simeone guided his side into the last 16 of UEFA Champions League for the sixth time since he came to reign in 2011, while before his arrival Atlético had only done so seven times in 60 years. On 11 March 2020, Atlético Madrid eliminated the reigning European champions Liverpool with a 3–2 triumph after extra-time at Anfield, winning 4–2 on aggregate, after Saúl secured a 1–0 first-leg win in the reverse via a 5th-minute strike. On 27 June 2020, Simeone won his 195th game in the top-flight of Spanish football as Atleti beat Alavés 2–1 on Saturday. With the triumph, the Argentine has overtaken the club legend, Luis Aragonés (194), as the manager with the most La Liga wins in the club's history.

On 7 July 2020, Simeone overtook John Toshack as the third coach with the most games managed at a single club in the history of the top-flight of Spanish football during Atleti's match against Celta Vigo, his 323rd game in La Liga. Only Miguel Muñoz (Real Madrid, 424) and, the club legend, Luis Aragonés (407) remain ahead of him.

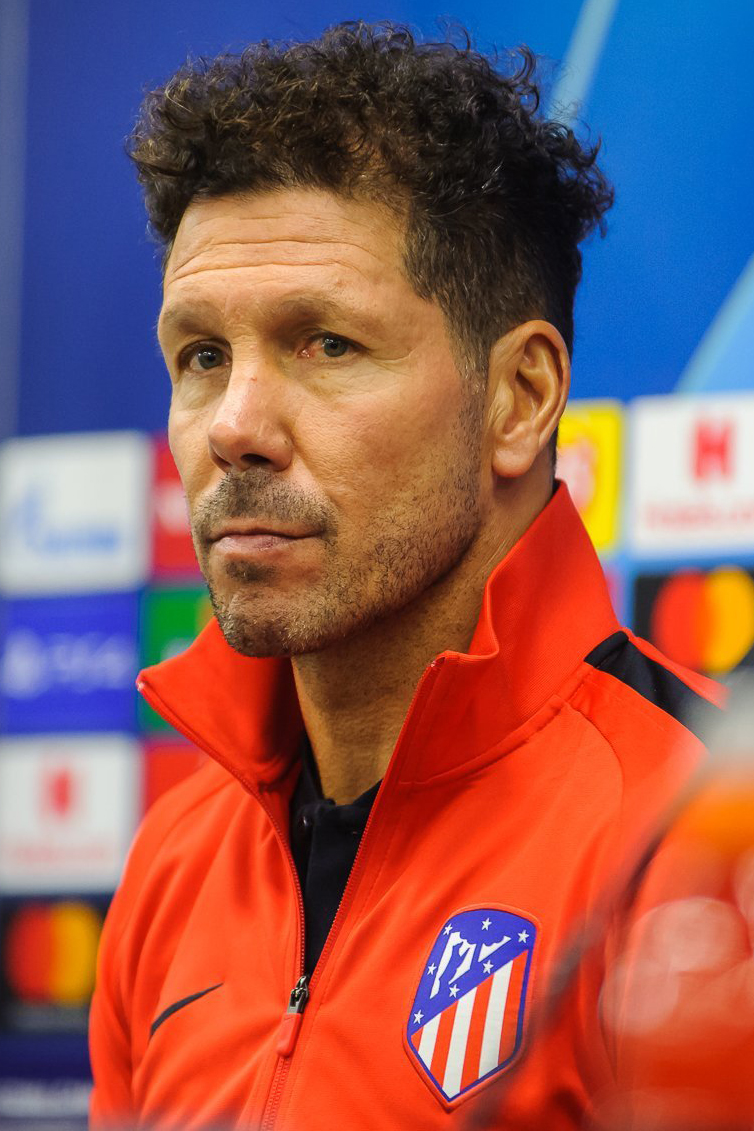
Simeone in 2019

For the 2020–21 season, Atlético parted ways with longtime-serving forward Diego Costa and acquired Luis Suárez after his departure from Barcelona. The team brought back Yannick Carrasco from Dalian Professional and also acquired Geoffrey Kondogbia from Valencia, Lucas Torreira on loan from Arsenal and Moussa Dembelé on loan from Lyon, while Thomas Partey left for Arsenal and Álvaro Morata was loaned to Juventus. On 17 October 2020, Simeone reached his 200th win in the league in a 2–0 away win against Celta Vigo. On 30 December 2020, he reached his 500th match in charge of Atlético Madrid in a 1–0 win over Getafe. On 10 March 2021, Simeone overtook Luis Aragonés for the most wins ever as manager of the club in a 2–1 home win against Athletic Bilbao, his 309th win overall.

After a 4–0 away defeat to Bayern Munich and many injuries to key players in November 2020, Simeone modified the formation of his squad by introducing a three-man defence for the first time in his tenure coaching Atlético. In this formation, Carrasco played as a wing-back, with left centre-back Mario Hermoso being instructed to also cover the left-back position when Carrasco moved forward, which made the formation tactically flexible between a three-man and four-man defence. After the formational change, Atlético were solidified defensively and began a streak of victories, including a 1–0 home victory against Barcelona. This streak propelled the team to a ten-point lead over Real Madrid and Barcelona in the 2020–21 La Liga title race by February. However, a series of bad results from February to April meant that Atlético were eliminated from the Champions League by Chelsea and Real Madrid closed the league gap to two points before the final matchday, meaning Atlético needed a victory in the last La Liga round to win the championship. Thanks to a Suárez goal in the 67th minute, Atlético Madrid managed eventually to win their second La Liga title under Simeone, after a 2–1 away win over Real Valladolid on the final match day.

On 8 July 2021, Atleti announced their extension to Simeone's contract until 2024, and in the same announcement it was also made known that the members of his coaching staff had also renewed their contracts.

==== 2022–present: Contract extension and new records ====
On 9 November 2023, Simeone extended his contract with Atlético Madrid until 30 June 2027. Later that month, on 28 November, he managed his 100th Champions League match in a 3–1 away victory over Feyenoord, becoming the third manager to achieve this feat with one club following Alex Ferguson and Arsène Wenger. On 23 November 2024, he managed his 700th match with the club in all competitions in a 2–1 victory over Alavés. On 2 May 2026, Simeone reached his 1000th career match as a manager in a 2–0 away win over Valencia.

== Style of management ==
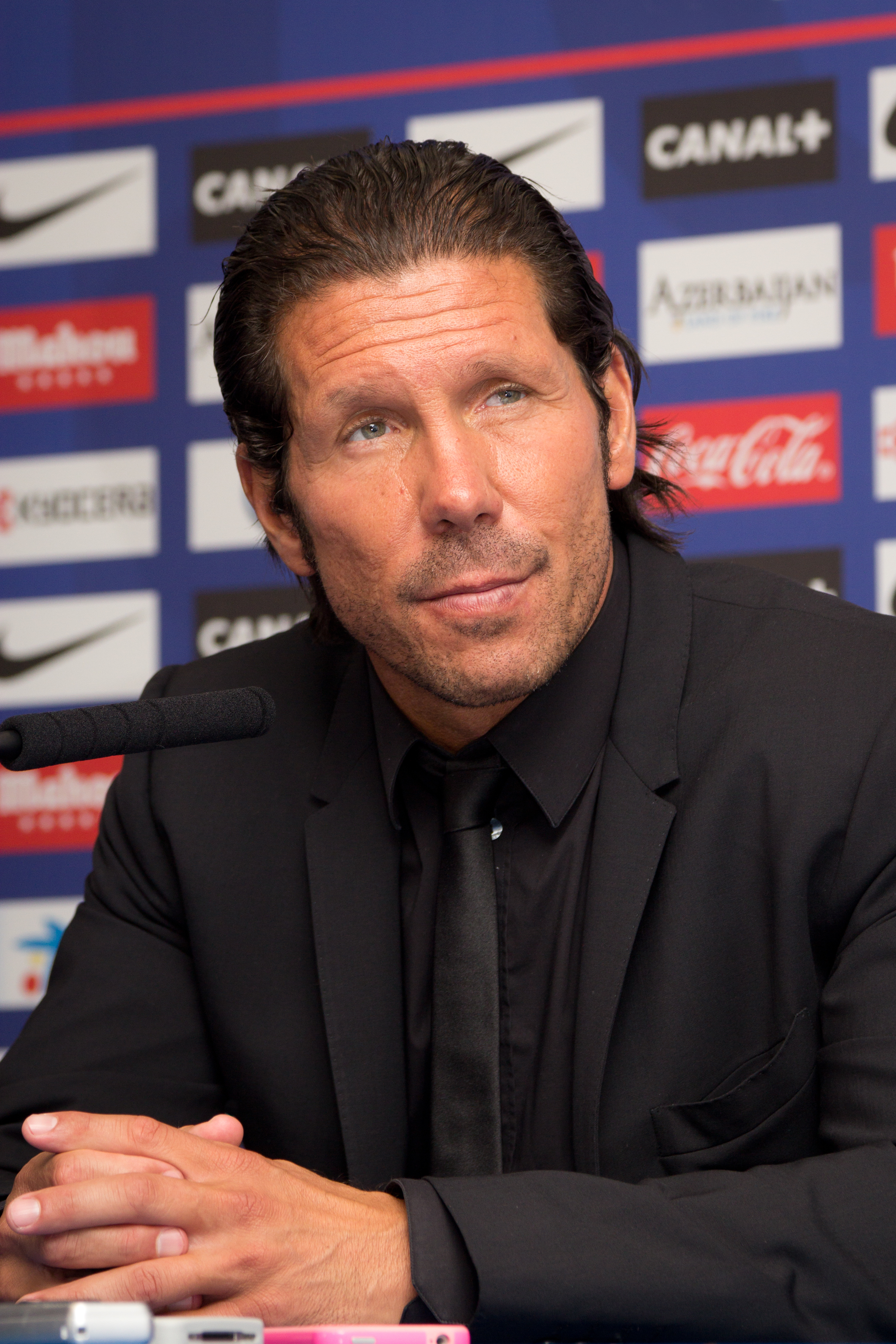
Simeone in 2013

Simeone's preferred formation is the 4–4–2, which he first practised when he was manager of Estudiantes in 2006. In this formation, the two wingers move inside and act like attacking midfielders, creating space for the full backs and fluidity in the attack, effectively being a 4–2–2–2 when the team is on the offensive. The two holding midfielders provide the defensive muscle needed to win midfield battles. Utilizing this formation, Simeone's Estudiantes won the 2006 Apertura by beating Boca Juniors 2–1 while being down to ten men from the first half. It is essentially this formation that Simeone also utilizes at Atlético Madrid. Simeone has listed his coaching influences being Marcelo Bielsa, Sven-Göran Eriksson, Alfio Basile, Victorio Spinetto, Luigi Simoni, Carlos Bilardo and Radomir Antić.

When he was manager at River Plate, a team graced with the attacking talents of Radamel Falcao, Alexis Sánchez, Ariel Ortega, Mauro Rosales, Diego Buonanotte, Augusto Fernández and Sebastián Abreu, Simeone played an aggressive 3–3–1–3 formation reminiscent of those used by influential manager (and Simeone's mentor) Marcelo Bielsa. Using this formation, River won the 2008 Clausura, but in the next season, with Sánchez having returned to Udinese and several players suffering from injuries, the 3–3–1–3 backfired and River finished bottom of the table, with Simeone being sacked in the process.

A common feature of Simeone's teams is defensive compactness and quick counter-attacks. Their defending consists of two stages: deep defending in their own defensive third in a narrow 4–4–2 consisting of two closely connected defensive lines of four players, and counter-pressing in their opponents' third to win the ball high up the pitch. When the ball is won, the team attack as a unit, deploying their fluid 4–2–2–2 formation, with the forwards often shifting to the flanks to create even more space. In defense, the key idea is to force opponents into wide areas, gain numerical dominance in the ball's zone and steal the ball or force the opponent into a backward pass. Counter-pressing consists of reducing an opposing team's space, disrupting their build-up and reducing the number of "safe" positions for opponents' movement on the pitch, thus eliminating goal threats. Claudio Ranieri's Premier League-winning 2015–16 Leicester City team has been compared to Simeone's Atletico Madrid for upsetting bigger teams by also playing a narrow 4–4–2 and being compact in defense and midfield.

In the short time he managed Italian side Catania in 2011, he switched between a 4–2–3–1 and a 4–3–1–2 in order to bring out the best from playmaker Adrián Ricchiuti while employing many of the counter-attacking features that would later become his trademark at Atlético. Ricchiuti was tasked with linking the midfield and attack and creating chances for whichever of Maxi López, Gonzalo Bergessio and Francesco Lodi were selected up front. Simeone said he did not want to "fossilise [himself] with a rigid tactic", saying managers cannot have a favourite formation "for the simple fact that we have to adapt not to what we like but to what we have to work with". His players stayed compact and narrow when defending, with the wide men – two of Ezequiel Schelotto, Giuseppe Mascara, Raphael Martinho and Alejandro Gómez – expected to drop back and tuck in when out of possession; meanwhile, playmaker Ricchiuti and the central striker – more often than not López – moved back into midfield rather than pressing the centre-backs, with the aim being preventing simple passes into the middle of the pitch.

Simeone is also renowned for his attention to detail and quick adaptability to a game's changing situations. During his time as manager of Atlético Madrid, he has placed emphasis on creating chances from set-pieces, while not allowing the opponent to create chances from set-pieces. Several important goals, including the one that gave Atlético the 2014 La Liga title, have been scored from set-pieces. While his teams aren't known for controlling possession, they are lauded for controlling the pace and space in which a game is played. He is quick in making tactical changes to influence a game's outcome. In the 2015–16 UEFA Champions League semi-final against Bayern in Munich, with his team down 1–0 after 45 minutes, he moved Saúl Ñíguez from the right wing to a holding midfielder position, changing the 4–4–2 to a 4–1–4–1 formation with Yannick Carrasco and Antoine Griezmann on the flanks. While on paper Saúl was seemingly out of his normal position in this role, in effect this change meant that midfielders Gabi and Koke, who were overwhelmed in the first half by Bayern's pressure, would now be shielded by Saúl's presence behind them, and the midfield would regain its much-needed composure. Eventually, the change had the desired outcome, with Atlético equalizing through Griezmann and advancing to the Champions League final.

Simeone has also earned praise for instilling confidence and discipline in his players, which has helped his teams emerge victorious under adverse conditions. For example, in the last game of 2014's La Liga, at the Camp Nou against Barcelona, when Atlético needed a draw to win the championship, both Diego Costa and Arda Turan were taken out of the game due to injury in the first half, and Barcelona opened the scoring. However, Simeone was able to rally his team at half-time and Godin's header in the second half gave them the much needed draw. Simeone said: "At half-time I told them to be relaxed. In the first half we did well. I knew if we scored, it would cost them. That's what happened. There was an amazing collective effort from everyone."

During a leg in the 2017–18 UEFA Europa League semi-final against Arsenal at the Emirates, Atlético were playing without key players Diego Costa, Juanfran, Filipe Luís and Vitolo, and in the 10th minute, Šime Vrsaljko was sent off with a red card, followed by Simeone being also sent off. Despite playing with ten men, without their manager at the bench, with most players in makeshift positions, and enjoying only 24% of ball possession, the team lost neither its shape nor its composure, eventually holding out to a 1–1 draw that was enough for them to progress to the final. "Simeone taught us to enjoy suffering," Arda Turan said in 2015, supporting this feeling that the Argentinean coach is a man who takes the best things out of bad situations. Diego Godin has also said about his manager: "The players would die for him [Simeone]. He gives belief that we can compete against much bigger teams. We have great confidence in him, we are with him to the death and also he with us – and that shows on the pitch. I believe the whole team has confidence in the coach and we all know the path we have to take: he marks the way for us and we go with him until the death. That is how you achieve things."

In the 2020–21 season, amid COVID-19 and injury crisis among the team's forwards, Simeone experimented with back three formations, such as 5–3–2 and 3–5–2. This saw them adapt to a new, more possession-heavy style, averaging the majority of possession over the season for the first time since their victorious 2013–14 season.

== Personal life ==
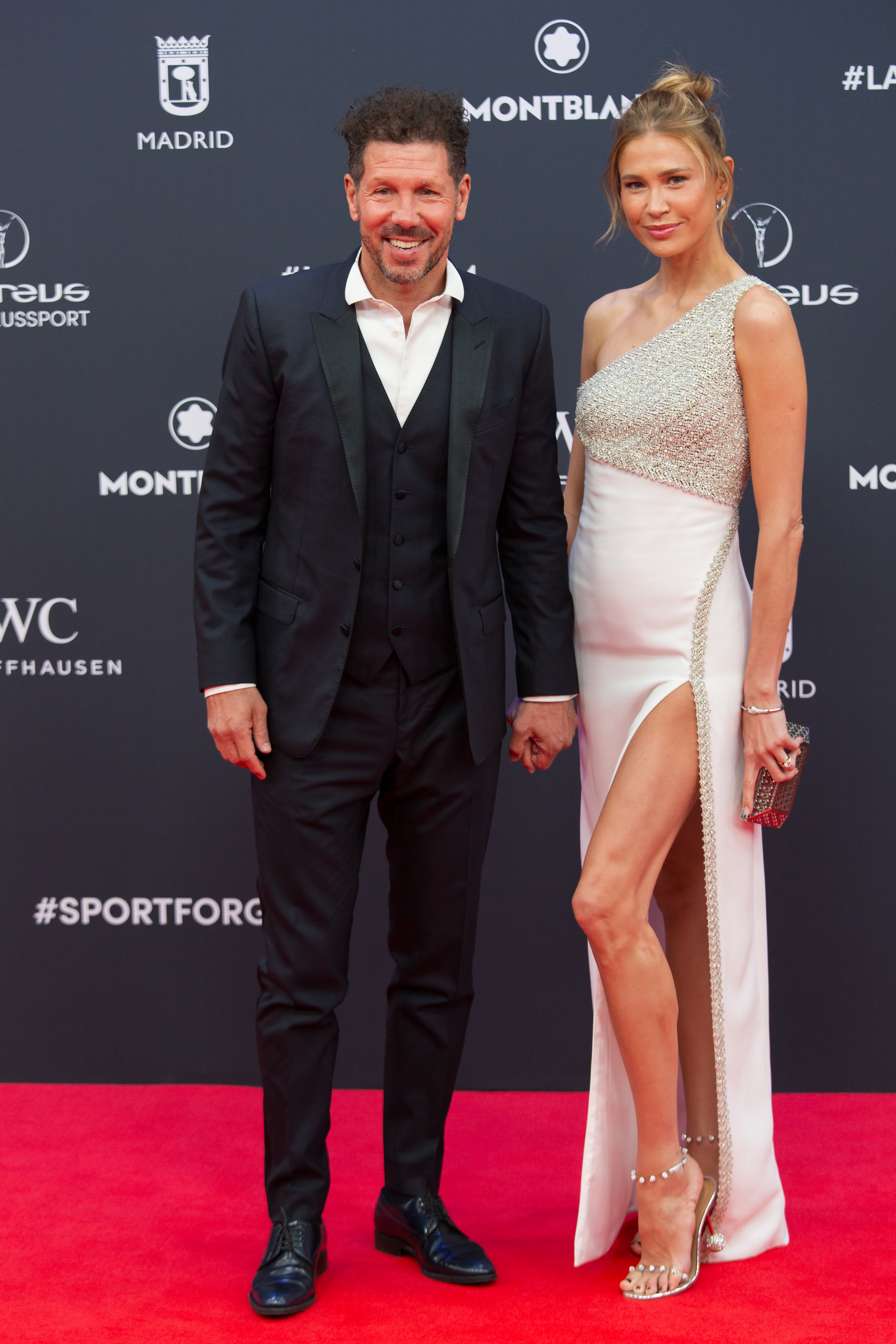
Simeone with his wife Carla Pereyra at the Laureus World Sports Awards in 2024

Simeone's sons Giovanni and Giuliano (from his first wife Carolina Baldini) are professional footballers, playing for Torino and Atlético, respectively. His middle son Gianluca (from his first wife) played professionally between 2018 and 2025, in Argentina and in Spain, and, as of 2026, is now working as a football agent.

Simeone also has two daughters with model Carla Pereyra. Simeone and Pereyra got married in secret in June 2019.

When asked whether he believes in God, Simeone replied: “I believe in God. I believe that it’s the most important thing. It’s important to believe in something.” La Nación described him as having "an intense dialogue with God". Simeone also attended Mass with Pope Leo XIV during his visit to Spain and later met with the pontiff in Madrid.

== Career statistics ==
=== Club ===
Club	Season	League			National cup (Note: Includes Coppa Italia, Copa del Rey)		Continental		Other		Total	
Club	Season	Division	Apps	Goals	Apps	Goals	Apps	Goals	Apps	Goals	Apps	Goals
Vélez Sársfield	1987–88	Primera División	28	4							28	4
Vélez Sársfield	1988–89	Primera División	16	2							16	2
Vélez Sársfield	1989–90	Primera División	32	8							32	8
Vélez Sársfield	Total		76	14							76	14
Pisa	1990–91	Serie A	32	4	1	0	—		—		33	4
Pisa	1991–92	Serie B	24	2	4	0	—		—		28	2
Pisa	Total		56	6	5	0	—		—		61	6
Sevilla	1992–93	La Liga	33	4	2	0	—		—		35	4
Sevilla	1993–94	La Liga	31	8	7	4	—		—		38	12
Sevilla	Total		64	12	9	4	—		—		73	16
Atlético Madrid	1994–95	La Liga	29	6	8	2	—		—		37	8
Atlético Madrid	1995–96	La Liga	37	12	8	0	—		—		45	12
Atlético Madrid	1996–97	La Liga	32	3	3	0	7 (Note: Appearances in UEFA Champions League)	4	2 (Note: Appearances in Supercopa de España)	0	44	7
Atlético Madrid	Total		98	21	19	2	7	4	2	0	126	27
Inter Milan	1997–98	Serie A	30	6	2	0	9 (Note: Appearances in UEFA Cup)	1	—		41	7
Inter Milan	1998–99	Serie A	27	5	7	0	9	2	—		43	7
Inter Milan	Total		57	11	9	0	18	3	—		84	14
Lazio	1999–2000	Serie A	28	5	7	2	11	0	1 (Note: Appearance in UEFA Super Cup)	0	47	7
Lazio	2000–01	Serie A	30	2	2	0	8	1	1 (Note: Appearance in Supercoppa Italiana)	0	41	3
Lazio	2001–02	Serie A	8	1	0	0	5	0	—		13	1
Lazio	2002–03	Serie A	24	7	4	0	7	0	—		35	7
Lazio	Total		90	15	13	2	31	1	2	0	136	18
Atlético Madrid	2003–04	La Liga	28	2	4	0	—		—		32	2
Atlético Madrid	2004–05	La Liga	8	0	1	0	6 (Note: Appearances in UEFA Intertoto Cup)	1	—		15	1
Atlético Madrid	Total		36	2	5	0	6	1	—		47	3
Racing Club	2004–05	Primera División	18	2	—		—		—		18	2
Racing Club	2005–06	Primera División	20	1	—		—		—		20	1
Racing Club	Total		38	3	—		—		—		38	3
Career total			515	84	60	8	62	9	4	0	641	101

=== International ===
Argentina
Year	Apps	Goals
1988	2	1
1989	3	0
1990	1	0
1991	9	2
1992	3	1
1993	13	1
1994	10	0
1995	8	2
1996	6	2
1997	9	1
1998	12	0
1999	11	1
2000	11	0
2001	6	0
2002	2	0
Total	106	11

==== International goals ====
Argentina score listed first, score column indicates score after each Simeone goal.

No.	Date	Venue	Opponent	Score	Result	Competition
1	16 July 1988	Bruce Stadium, Canberra, Australia	Saudi Arabia	1–0	2–0	Australia Bicentenary Gold Cup
2	12 July 1991	Estadio Municipal, Concepción, Chile	Paraguay	2–0	4–1	1991 Copa América
3	21 July 1991	Estadio Nacional de Chile, Santiago, Chile	Colombia	1–0	2–1	1991 Copa América
4	20 October 1992	King Fahd II Stadium, Riyadh, Saudi Arabia	Saudi Arabia	3–0	3–1	1992 King Fahd Cup Final
5	23 June 1993	Estadio George Capwell, Guayaquil, Ecuador	Colombia	1–0	1–1	1993 Copa América
6 (Note: The matches against Slovakia League (22 June 1995, Mendoza), in which Simeone scored 1 goal, and against Poland B League (20 June 1996, Tucumán), in which Simeone also scored 1 goal, were originally considered full international matches by the Argentine FA, but later removed from the list of official matches.)	22 June 1995	Estadio Malvinas Argentinas, Mendoza, Argentina	Slovakia League	5–0	6–0	Friendly
7	11 July 1995	Estadio Parque Artigas, Paysandú, Uruguay	Chile	2–0	4–0	1995 Copa América
8	20 June 1996	Tucumán, Argentina	Poland B League	–	2–0	Copa La Gaceta
9	9 October 1996	Polideportivo de Pueblo Nuevo, San Cristóbal, Venezuela	Venezuela	3–1	5–2	1998 FIFA World Cup qualification
10	8 June 1997	El Monumental, Buenos Aires, Argentina	Ecuador	2–0	2–0	1998 FIFA World Cup qualification
11	1 July 1999	Estadio Feliciano Cáceres, Luque, Paraguay	Ecuador	1–0	3–1	1999 Copa América

== Managerial statistics ==
As of match played 22 November 2026

Managerial record by team and tenure
Team	From	To	Record					Ref.
Team	From	To	G	W	D	L	Win %	Ref.
Racing Club	18 February 2006	4 May 2006	14	5	3	6	35.71	
Estudiantes	18 May 2006	3 December 2007	61	34	15	12	55.74	
River Plate	15 December 2007	7 November 2008	45	20	13	12	44.44	
San Lorenzo	15 April 2009	3 April 2010	47	21	9	17	44.68	
Catania	19 January 2011	1 June 2011	18	7	3	8	38.89	
Racing Club	21 June 2011	23 December 2011	20	8	10	2	40.00	
Atlético Madrid	23 December 2011	Present	817	481	174	162	58.87	
Career total			1,022	576	227	219	56.36	

== Honours ==
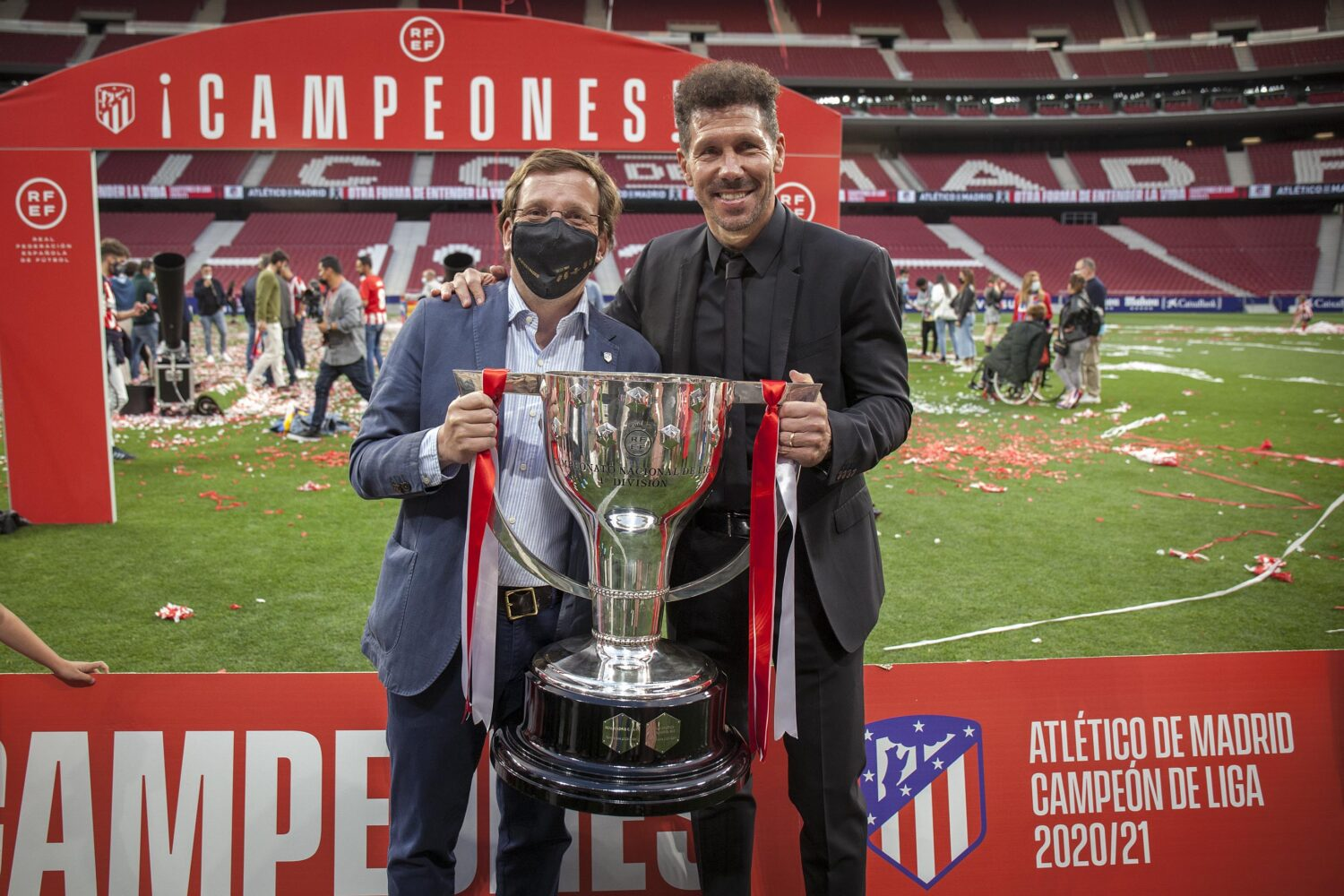
Simeone posing with the La Liga trophy won in 2021

=== Player ===
Atlético Madrid

- La Liga: 1995–96
- Copa del Rey: 1995–96

Inter Milan

- UEFA Cup: 1997–98

Lazio

- Serie A: 1999–2000
- Coppa Italia: 1999–2000
- Supercoppa Italiana: 2000
- UEFA Super Cup: 1999

Argentina

- Copa América: 1991, 1993
- FIFA Confederations Cup: 1992
- CONMEBOL–UEFA Cup of Champions: 1993
- Summer Olympics Silver Medal: 1996

Individual

- Trofeo EFE: 1995–96

=== Manager ===
Estudiantes

- Argentine Primera División: 2006 Torneo Apertura

River Plate

- Argentine Primera División: 2008 Torneo Clausura

Atlético Madrid

- La Liga: 2013–14, 2020–21
- Copa del Rey: 2012–13; runner-up: 2025–26
- Supercopa de España: 2014
- UEFA Europa League: 2011–12, 2017–18
- UEFA Super Cup: 2012, 2018
- UEFA Champions League runner-up: 2013–14, 2015–16

Individual

- La Liga Manager of the Month: October 2013, November 2015, March 2017, October 2023, December 2024
- Trofeo Comunidad Iberoamericana: 2014
- La Liga Manager of the Year: 2012–13, 2013–14, 2015–16
- Miguel Muñoz Trophy: 2013–14, 2015–16, 2020–21
- Facebook/MARCA Football Awards (Best Manager): 2016
- IFFHS World's Best Club Coach: 2016
- Globe Soccer Master Coach Special Award: 2017
- IFFHS Club Coach of the Decade: 2011–2020
- Konex Awards: 2020

== See also ==
- List of UEFA Cup and Europa League winning managers
- List of football managers with the most matches
- List of footballers with 100 or more caps
