= Iván Romero (footballer, born 1980) =

Spanish footballer

Personal information
- Full name: Iván Romero Mingo
- Date of birth: 21 July 1980 (age 46)
- Place of birth: Madrid, Spain
- Height: 1.71 m (5 ft 7 1/2 in)
- Position: Left back

Senior career*
Years	Team	Apps	(Gls)
2001–2002	Rayo Vallecano B		
2002–2003	Alcalá	26	(0)
2003–2004	Atlético B	32	(0)
2004	Atlético Madrid	1	(0)
2004–2005	Poli Ejido	16	(0)
2005	Gimnàstic	8	(0)
2006–2007	Jaén	46	(0)
2007–2008	Racing Ferrol	28	(0)
2008–2009	Eibar	18	(0)
2009–2010	Racing Ferrol	23	(0)
2011	Torrejón	5	(0)
2011–2012	Alcalá	26	(1)
2012–2013	San Fernando Henares	30	(0)
Total		259	(1)
- * Club domestic league appearances and goals

Iván Romero Mingo (born 21 July 1980 in Madrid) is a Spanish former footballer who played as a left back.
