= Raúl Medina =

Spanish footballer

Personal information
- Full name: Raúl Medina Zamora
- Date of birth: 10 March 1983 (age 43)
- Place of birth: Arganda del Rey, Spain
- Height: 1.86 m (6 ft 1 in)
- Position: Midfielder

Youth career
- Atlético Madrid

Senior career*
Years	Team	Apps	(Gls)
2002–2008	Atlético Madrid B	119	(3)
2004–2008	Atlético Madrid	6	(0)
2005–2006	→ Ciudad Murcia (loan)	29	(1)
2006–2007	→ Xerez (loan)	25	(1)
2008–2012	Puertollano	112	(6)
2012–2015	Cacereño	61	(7)
2015–2016	Coruxo	22	(0)
Total		374	(18)

International career
2003	Spain U20	1	(0)
- * Club domestic league appearances and goals

Raúl Medina Zamora (born 10 March 1983 in Arganda del Rey, Madrid) is a Spanish former professional footballer who played as a defensive midfielder.
