= Álvaro Novo =

Spanish footballer (born 1978)

Personal information
- Full name: Álvaro Novo Ramírez
- Date of birth: 16 May 1978 (age 48)
- Place of birth: Córdoba, Spain
- Height: 1.84 m (6 ft 1/2 in)
- Position: Midfielder

Youth career
- Don Bosco
- Córdoba

Senior career*
Years	Team	Apps	(Gls)
1996–1998	Carabanchel	37	(10)
1998–2000	Mallorca B	53	(9)
2000–2003	Mallorca	101	(7)
2003–2005	Atlético Madrid	37	(1)
2005–2008	Real Sociedad	53	(3)
Total		281	(30)
- * Club domestic league appearances and goals

Álvaro Novo Ramírez (born 16 May 1978) is a Spanish former professional footballer who played as a right midfielder.

Over eight seasons, he amassed La Liga totals of 183 matches and 11 goals with Mallorca, Atlético Madrid and Real Sociedad.

== Club career ==
Novo was born in Córdoba, Andalusia. After finishing his football development at local Córdoba CF he started as a senior at lowly RCD Carabanchel in Madrid, helping the club to its only two Segunda División B years, after which he left in 1998.

Novo then moved to RCD Mallorca, first playing with the reserves, competing one season in the Segunda División and being relegated. He made his debut for the main squad in the year 2000, then became an undisputed starter for the Balearic Islands side, partnering Serb Jovan Stanković in the wings.

After a third place in La Liga in the 2000–01 campaign, with the subsequent qualification to the UEFA Champions League, and the Copa del Rey conquest in 2003, Novo left for Atlético Madrid, rejoining former Mallorca coach Gregorio Manzano whom asked for his signing repeatedly. After the manager was replaced for 2004–05, he disappeared from the team's lineups (only five matches).

In the summer of 2005, Novo signed with Real Sociedad. Again, a coaching change – José Mari Bakero was fired – made him go from an important attacking unit to a third-string squad member, the Basque could not release him due to his high wages and the player also refused to go on loan to neighbours SD Eibar; his contract expired in June 2008, and he was released.
