= Nano (footballer, born 1982) =

Spanish footballer

Personal information
- Full name: Fernando Macedo da Silva Rodilla
- Date of birth: 20 April 1982 (age 44)
- Place of birth: A Coruña, Spain
- Height: 1.87 m (6 ft 1 1/2 in)
- Positions: Winger; left-back

Youth career
- Ural
- Barcelona

Senior career*
Years	Team	Apps	(Gls)
1999	Barcelona C	2	(0)
1999–2003	Barcelona B	111	(21)
1999–2003	Barcelona	4	(0)
2003–2006	Atlético Madrid	39	(6)
2005–2006	→ Getafe (loan)	8	(2)
2006–2008	Cádiz	37	(2)
2008–2009	Racing Ferrol	22	(4)
2009–2012	Numancia	90	(13)
2012–2013	Osasuna	18	(0)
2013–2014	Alavés	23	(0)
2015–2018	Racing Ferrol	104	(7)
Total		458	(55)

International career
1998–1999	Spain U16	9	(4)
1999	Spain U17	3	(0)
2000–2001	Spain U18	11	(2)
2001	Spain U20	1	(0)
2000–2003	Spain U21	2	(0)
Medal record
Representing Spain
UEFA European Under-16 Championship
Winner	1999 Czech Republic
- * Club domestic league appearances and goals

Fernando Macedo da Silva Rodilla (born 20 April 1982), known as Nano, is a Spanish former professional footballer who played mainly as a left winger.

He started out at Barcelona but, after only six competitive appearances with the first team, he went on to resume his career in both Segunda División and Segunda División B. In La Liga, he also represented Atlético Madrid, Getafe and Osasuna, amassing totals of 69 games and eight goals.

== Club career ==
Nano was born in A Coruña, Galicia. At age 16, he seemed on the verge of a promising future as he was already playing with FC Barcelona's reserves, and the following year he made his first-team – and La Liga – debut, against Real Zaragoza; he would, however, not be able to progress any further in his five-year stint with the Catalans, only appearing in three more games with the main squad.

After a solid 2003–04 season with Atlético Madrid, with qualification to the UEFA Intertoto Cup, Nano's career faded into obscurity as he was rarely featured with another club from Madrid, Getafe CF, and slightly more with Cádiz CF (the latter in the Segunda División).

Nano then joined lowly Racing de Ferrol, impressing enough to return to the second tier and sign a three-year contract with CD Numancia. He scored five goals in 37 matches in the 2011–12 campaign, helping the Soria side to finish in tenth position.

In June 2012, Nano returned to the top flight with CA Osasuna on a free transfer, agreeing to a two-year contract with the option of one more, and a buyout clause of €2 million. Unwanted by manager José Luis Mendilibar having not scored during his year in Pamplona, he dropped back to division two in July 2013 on a two-year deal at Deportivo Alavés.

Released again without a goal to his name, Nano returned to Ferrol in November 2014 initially to train. He remained there for the rest of his career, signing one last contract in February 2017.

== International career ==
On 29 December 2005, Nano scored the opening goal of Galicia's 3–2 friendly win over Uruguay in Santiago de Compostela. It was the region's first official match since 1930.

== Honours ==
Spain U16

- UEFA European Under-16 Championship: 1999
