= Antonio López (footballer, born 1981) =

Spanish footballer

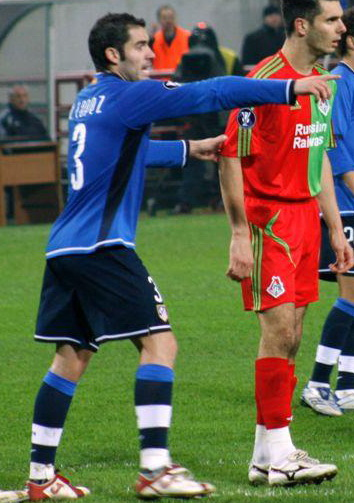
- López in action for Atlético Madrid in 2007

Personal information
- Full name: Antonio López Guerrero
- Date of birth: 13 September 1981 (age 45)
- Place of birth: Benidorm, Spain
- Height: 1.73 m (5 ft 8 in)
- Position: Left-back

Youth career
- 1996–1999: Atlético Madrid

Senior career*
Years	Team	Apps	(Gls)
1999–2001	Atlético Madrid B	39	(3)
2000–2012	Atlético Madrid	216	(11)
2002–2004	→ Osasuna (loan)	71	(2)
2012–2014	Mallorca	17	(0)
Total		343	(16)

International career
2002–2003	Spain U21	6	(0)
2005–2007	Spain	16	(1)
- * Club domestic league appearances and goals

Antonio López Guerrero (Spanish pronunciation: [anˈtonjo ˈlopeθ ɣeˈreɾo]; born 13 September 1981) is a Spanish former professional footballer who played mainly as a left-back.

He spent most of his 15-year career with Atlético Madrid, appearing in 270 competitive matches and winning four major titles, including two Europa League trophies. Also in La Liga, he played for Osasuna and Mallorca.

López represented Spain at the 2006 World Cup.

== Club career ==
=== Atlético Madrid ===
A product of Atlético Madrid's youth system, López was born in Benidorm, Province of Alicante. He first appeared for the first team in 2000–01 while the Colchoneros were in the Segunda División, and contributed 20 matches the following season for a La Liga return, after a two-year hiatus.

Subsequently, López was loaned for two seasons to fellow top-division club CA Osasuna, where he missed only five league games. During his Navarre spell he scored twice (both of the goals coming in 2002–03), most notably in a 1–0 home win against RCD Espanyol on 15 December 2002.

López quickly became first-choice in his second stint at the Vicente Calderón Stadium. However, during the 2007–08 campaign he lost his position to Mariano Pernía, and would end serving more time at right-back due to injuries to teammates Giourkas Seitaridis and Juan Valera; when selected, he was the side's undisputed captain.

On 15 March 2009, López scored the winner through a rare header as Atlético came from behind 2–0 to beat Villarreal CF at home. After the coach change, with former club player Abel Resino taking over from Javier Aguirre, he was made the starter, but an injury made Pernía finish the season in the starting XI.

Benefitting from a road accident to Pernía in the summer, López played most of 2009–10. On 2 January 2010, again with his head – but in the last minute – he netted against Sevilla FC at home to make it 2–1. On 1 April, he scored in the same fashion in an eventual 2–2 draw at Valencia CF in the quarter-finals of the UEFA Europa League, a competition which was won in Hamburg with him playing the entire 120 minutes of the 2–1 victory over Fulham and lifting the trophy as captain.

=== Mallorca ===
In late May 2012, after 343 official games, López was released by Atlético. The following month, he signed for two years with RCD Mallorca with an option for a further season.

== International career ==
López made his debut with Spain on 30 March 2005, in a 2006 FIFA World Cup qualifier against Serbia and Montenegro in Belgrade (0–0). He scored his only international goal during the successful campaign, hitting home from 25 metres in the first minute of a 6–0 rout at San Marino on 12 October.

Supposed to back up Asier del Horno in the final stages, López would not benefit from the former's injury days before the tournament started, as Argentine-born Pernía would be promoted to first-choice. He would only appear against Saudi Arabia in Germany, with Spain being eliminated in the round of 16.

=== International goal ===
Score and result list Spain's goal tally first, score column indicates score after López goal.

International goal scored by Antonio López
No.	Date	Venue	Opponent	Score	Result	Competition
1	12 October 2005	Olimpico, Serravalle, San Marino	San Marino	1–0	6–0	2006 World Cup qualification

== Honours ==
Atlético Madrid

- UEFA Europa League: 2009–10, 2011–12
- UEFA Super Cup: 2010
- UEFA Intertoto Cup: 2007
- Segunda División: 2001–02
- Copa del Rey runner-up: 2009–10
