= Jorge Larena =

Spanish footballer (born 1981)

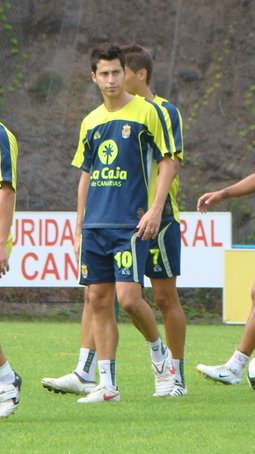
- Larena training with Las Palmas in 2009

Personal information
- Full name: Jorge Larena-Avellaneda Roig
- Date of birth: 29 September 1981 (age 45)
- Place of birth: Las Palmas, Spain
- Height: 1.81 m (5 ft 11 in)
- Position: Attacking midfielder

Youth career
- Las Palmas

Senior career*
Years	Team	Apps	(Gls)
1997–2000	Las Palmas B		
2000–2002	Las Palmas	69	(8)
2002–2005	Atlético Madrid	83	(4)
2005–2008	Celta	77	(9)
2008–2011	Las Palmas	81	(4)
2012–2013	Huesca	55	(1)
2013–2014	Recreativo	29	(1)
2014–2019	AEK Larnaca	151	(24)
Total		545+	(51+)

International career
2002–2003	Spain U21	13	(4)
- * Club domestic league appearances and goals

Jorge Larena-Avellaneda Roig (born 29 September 1981), known as Larena, is a Spanish former professional footballer who played usually as an attacking midfielder.

He played 193 La Liga matches over seven seasons (15 goals), in representation of three teams, mainly Las Palmas for which he also appeared in the Segunda División. He also spent five years in the Cypriot First Division at the service of AEK Larnaca.

== Club career ==
Larena was born in Las Palmas, Canary Islands. A product of hometown club UD Las Palmas' youth ranks, he played one game for the first team in the 1999–2000 season as they returned to La Liga after an absence of 12 years, and was first choice the following two top-flight campaigns, suffering relegation in the second after scoring seven goals from 36 matches. He made his debut in the competition on 23 September 2000, six days before his 19th birthday, in a 1–1 home draw against Real Valladolid.

In summer 2002, Larena signed for Atlético Madrid, being regularly played by the Colchoneros over three seasons but rarely as a starter (37 appearances in that condition). Subsequently, he joined fellow top-division side RC Celta de Vigo, being relegated at the end of 2006–07. He scored six times the following year, but the Galicians nearly dropped down another level.

On 16 July 2008, Larena returned to his native region and Las Palmas, agreeing to a three-year contract with the Segunda División club. He made his official debut on 30 August, playing the entire 1–0 loss at Real Sociedad.

Larena appeared in only 13 matches (617 minutes of action) in 2010–11, and did not have his contract renewed. After being released by Las Palmas he went on trial at Football League One's AFC Bournemouth and Greenock Morton in the Scottish Football League First Division, but nothing came of it and he eventually signed for SD Huesca.

Having joined in 2014 at the age of 33, Larena then spent several seasons in the Cypriot First Division with AEK Larnaca FC, sharing teams with a host of compatriots.

== Career statistics ==
Appearances and goals by club, season and competition
Club	Season	League			Cup		Other		Total	
Club	Season	Division	Apps	Goals	Apps	Goals	Apps	Goals	Apps	Goals
Las Palmas	1999–2000	Segunda División	1	0	0	0	0	0	1	0
Las Palmas	2000–01	La Liga	32	1	1	0	—		33	1
Las Palmas	2001–02	La Liga	36	7	2	0	—		38	7
Las Palmas	Total		69	8	3	0	—		72	8
Atlético Madrid	2002–03	La Liga	28	1	4	0	—		32	1
Atlético Madrid	2003–04	La Liga	29	2	4	0	—		33	2
Atlético Madrid	2004–05	La Liga	26	1	4	0	3 (Note: Appearances in UEFA Intertoto Cup)	0	33	1
Atlético Madrid	Total		83	4	12	0	3	0	98	4
Celta	2005–06	La Liga	26	2	4	0	—		30	2
Celta	2006–07	La Liga	16	1	2	0	4 (Note: Appearances in UEFA Cup)	0	22	1
Celta	2007–08	Segunda División	35	6	1	0	—		36	6
Celta	Total		77	9	7	0	4	0	88	9
Las Palmas	2008–09	Segunda División	39	0	0	0	—		30	2
Las Palmas	2009–10	Segunda División	29	2	0	0	—		29	2
Las Palmas	2010–11	Segunda División	13	2	1	1	—		14	3
Las Palmas	Total		81	4	1	1	—		82	5
Huesca	2011–12	Segunda División	18	1	0	0	—		18	1
Huesca	2012–13	Segunda División	37	0	0	0	—		37	0
Huesca	Total		55	1	0	0	—		55	1
Recreativo	2013–14	Segunda División	29	1	4	0	—		33	1
AEK Larnaca	2014–15	Cypriot First Division	30	5	6	0	—		36	5
AEK Larnaca	2015–16	Cypriot First Division	27	4	1	0	2 (Note: Appearances in UEFA Europa League)	0	30	4
AEK Larnaca	2016–17	Cypriot First Division	32	5	4	0	8	0	44	5
AEK Larnaca	2017–18	Cypriot First Division	32	7	4	1	8	1	44	9
AEK Larnaca	2018–19	Cypriot First Division	30	3	5	0	9	2	44	5
AEK Larnaca	Total		151	24	20	1	27	3	198	28
Career total			545	51	47	2	34	3	626	56

== Honours ==
AEK Larnaca

- Cypriot Cup: 2017–18
- Cypriot Super Cup: 2018
