= José García Calvo =

Spanish footballer and club director

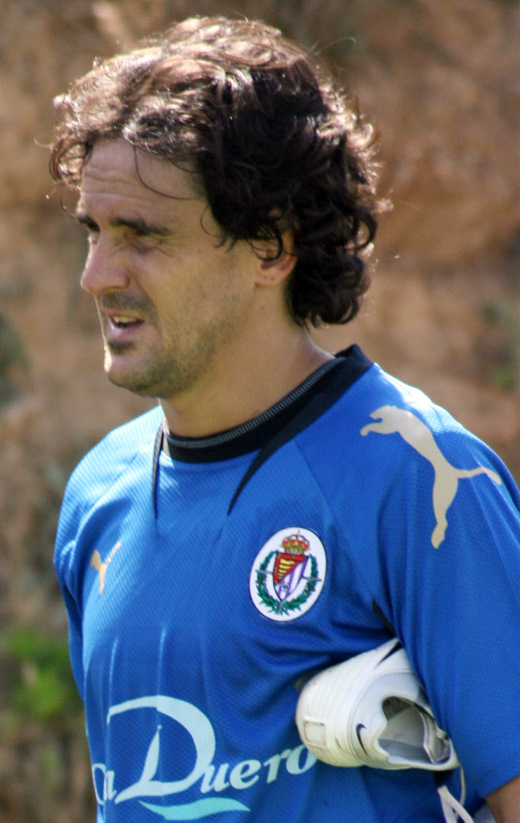
- García Calvo training with Valladolid in 2007

Personal information
- Full name: José Antonio García Calvo
- Date of birth: 1 April 1975 (age 51)
- Place of birth: Madrid, Spain
- Height: 1.85 m (6 ft 1 in)
- Position: Centre-back

Youth career
- Viajes Nogal-Berlín
- 1993–1994: Real Madrid

Senior career*
Years	Team	Apps	(Gls)
1994–1995	Real Madrid C	7	(0)
1994–1997	Real Madrid B	38	(0)
1996–1997	Real Madrid	16	(0)
1997–2001	Valladolid	128	(4)
2001–2006	Atlético Madrid	106	(4)
2006–2009	Valladolid	67	(4)
Total		362	(12)

International career
1996–1998	Spain U21	9	(0)
2002	Spain	3	(0)
- * Club domestic league appearances and goals

José Antonio García Calvo (born 1 April 1975) is a Spanish former professional footballer who played as a central defender.

During his career, he represented both Madrid clubs, Real and Atlético (but was mainly associated with Valladolid), appearing in 267 La Liga matches over 12 seasons and scoring ten goals.

== Club career ==
A product of Real Madrid's youth system, Madrid-born García Calvo appeared in six games for the first team as they won the La Liga championship in the 1996–97 season, eventually totalling only 16 during his spell. His first match came on 2 March 1996, in a 5–0 home win against UD Salamanca; Fernando Sanz, another centre-back from the academy, also played his first top-flight match that day. Subsequently, he signed for Real Valladolid where he was a regular, scoring his first professional goal in his first year in the 4–0 home defeat of Real Zaragoza.

García Calvo then spent five years in another club from the capital, Atlético Madrid. He was instrumental in the Colchoneros' 2002 promotion from Segunda División, with 35 matches and 11 bookings.

Unable to settle at Atlético in his final two seasons, García Calvo returned to Valladolid in summer 2006, helping to a return to the top tier after a three-year absence. He was an undisputed starter throughout the following campaign, netting in a 2–2 home draw with Deportivo de La Coruña on 2 September 2007 as the Castilla–La Mancha side went on to finally retain their status.

Following recurrent foot problems that ailed him throughout 2008–09, García Calvo announced his retirement from the game aged 34. One year later, he was appointed as his last club's director of football.

== International career ==
García Calvo earned three caps for the Spain national team, the first coming on 21 August 2002 against Hungary during a Ferenc Puskás testimonial match (1–1 draw).

Previously, he was picked for the under-21 side that won the 1998 UEFA European Championship.

== Honours ==
Real Madrid

- La Liga: 1996–97

Atlético Madrid

- Segunda División: 2001–02

Valladolid

- Segunda División: 2006–07

Spain U21

- UEFA European Under-21 Championship: 1998
