= 2000–01 Atlético Madrid season =

Season of football team

Club Atlético de Madrid
2000–01 season
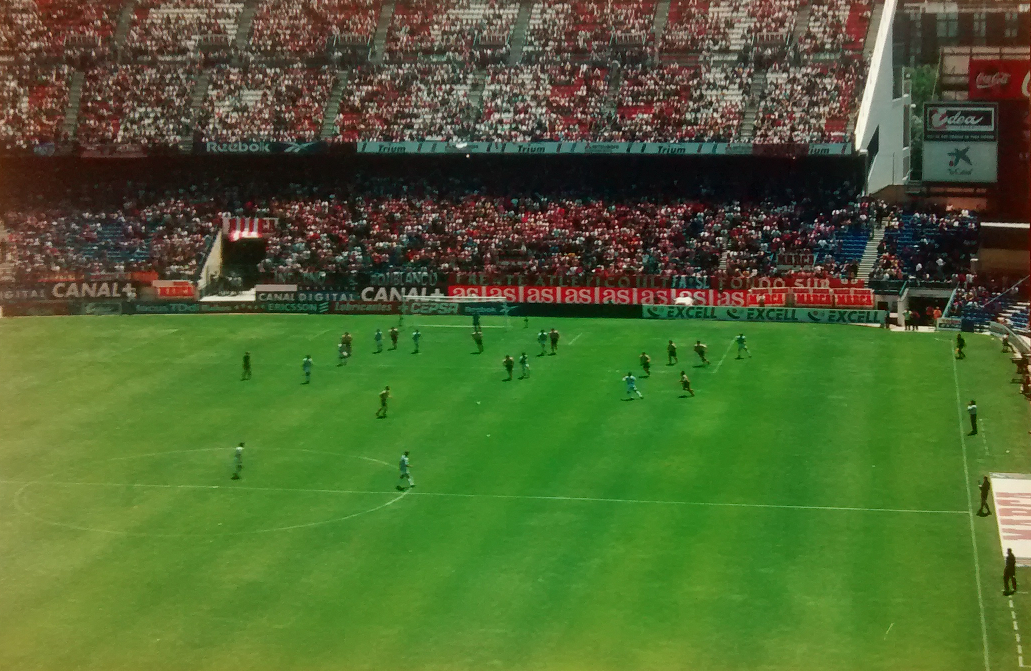
- Atlético facing CD Leganés at the Vicente Calderón Stadium on 27 May 2001.
- President: Jesús Gil
- Head coach: Fernando Zambrano (1st-5th round); Marcos Alonso Peña (6th-35th round); Carlos García Cantarero (36th-42nd round)
- Stadium: Vicente Calderón
- Segunda División: 4th
- Copa del Rey: Semifinals
- Top goalscorer: League: Salva (21); All: Salva (26)
- Highest home attendance: 56,000 vs Betis (25 February 2001)
- Lowest home attendance: 6,000 vs Osasuna (3 January 2001)
- Average home league attendance: 38,808
Home colours	Away colours

The 2000–01 campaign was the 95th season in Atlético Madrid's history and their 1st season in Segunda División of Spanish football. Also the club competed in Copa del Rey.

== Summary ==
For the first time ever, Atletico competed in a Segunda División tournament since 1929 when Primera División was registered as the top league. Owing to a chaotic environment outside the field in spite of President Gil appointing club legend Paulo Futre as Manager on 3 November 2000 and three coaches fired, the team never reached the 3rd position on the table and classifying to La Liga finishing tied in points along CD Tenerife but lost the goal average.

== Squad ==
Note: Flags indicate national team as defined under FIFA eligibility rules; some limited exceptions apply. Players may hold more than one non-FIFA nationality.

No.	Pos.	Nation	Player
1	GK	ESP	Toni Jiménez
2	DF	ESP	Iván Amaya
3	DF	ESP	Toni
4	MF	SUI	Raphaël Wicky
5	DF	ESP	Juan Manuel López
6	DF	ESP	Santi Denia
7	MF	ARG	Juan Gomez
8	MF	ARG	Óscar Mena
9	FW	ESP	Salva
10	FW	URU	Fernando Correa
11	FW	ESP	Jordi Lardín
12	FW	NGA	Abass Lawal
13	GK	ESP	Sergio Sánchez Sánchez
14	DF	YUG	Zoran Njeguš

No.	Pos.	Nation	Player
15	DF	ESP	Carlos Aguilera
16	MF	ESP	José Juan Luque
17	DF	FRA	Jean-François Hernandez
18	MF	ESP	Roberto Fresnedoso
19	FW	ESP	Kiko
20	MF	POR	Hugo Leal
21	MF	POR	Dani
22	FW	ESP	Juan Carlos Gómez Díaz
23	DF	BIH	Mirsad Hibić
24	MF	ESP	Carcedo
25	DF	ARG	Daniel Fagiani
28	MF	ESP	David Cubillo
35	FW	ESP	Fernando Torres

=== Transfers ===
In
Pos.	Name	from	Type
FW	Salva	Racing Santander	
DF	Iván Amaya	Rayo Vallecano	
MF	Juan Gomez	Real Sociedad	
MF	Sergio Sanchez	Sporting Gijon	loan ended
DF	Jean-François Hernandez	Rayo Vallecano	
FW	Juan Carlos	Sevilla CF	
DF	Mirsad Hibić	Sevilla CF	
MF	Juan Carcedo	OGC Nice	loan
FW	Fernando Torres	Atletico Madrid B	
FW	Abass Lawal	Atletico Madrid B	

Out
Pos.	Name	To	Type
FW	Jimmy Floyd Hasselbaink	Chelsea F.C.	
GK	José Molina	Deportivo	
MF	Juan Carlos Valeron	Deportivo	
DF	Joan Capdevila	Deportivo	
MF	Ruben Baraja	Valencia CF	
MF	Santiago Solari	Real Madrid	
DF	Carlos Gamarra	Flamengo	
DF	Celso Ayala	São Paulo	
MF	Radek Bejbl	RC Lens	

==== Winter ====
In
Pos.	Name	from	Type
DF	Raphaël Wicky	Werder Bremen	
MF	Dani	Benfica	
DF	Daniel Fagiani	Boca Juniors	

Out
Pos.	Name	To	Type
MF	Leonel Pilipauskas	Peñarol	
MF	Veljko Paunovic	Real Oviedo	loan
FW	Jordi Lardín	RCD Espanyol	

== Competitions ==
=== Segunda División ===
==== League table ====
Pos	Team	Pld	W	D	L	GF	GA	GD	Pts	Promotion or relegation
2	Betis (P)	42	21	12	9	49	32	+17	75	Promotion to La Liga
3	Tenerife (P)	42	21	11	10	58	32	+26	74	Promotion to La Liga
4	Atlético Madrid	42	21	11	10	59	39	+20	74	
5	Albacete	42	18	12	12	46	40	+6	66	
6	Recreativo	42	15	20	7	45	29	+16	65	

Rules for classification: 1st points; 2nd head-to-head points; 3rd head-to-head goal difference; 4th head-to-head goals scored; 5th goal difference; 6th number of goals scored; 7th Fair-play points
(P) Promoted

==== Results by round ====
Round	1	2	3	4	5	6	7	8	9	10	11	12	13	14	15	16	17	18	19	20	21	22	23	24	25	26	27	28	29	30	31	32	33	34	35	36	37	38	39	40	41	42
Ground	A	H	A	H	A	H	A	H	H	A	H	A	H	A	H	A	H	A	H	A	H	H	A	H	A	H	A	H	A	A	H	A	H	A	H	A	H	A	H	A	H	A
Result	L	L	L	W	D	D	D	W	D	L	L	W	D	D	W	L	W	W	D	L	W	D	D	W	W	W	W	W	L	D	W	W	W	L	L	W	W	D	W	W	W	W
Position	22	22	21	20	20	19	19	17	15	18	19	17	17	18	17	17	18	16	17	16	15	13	13	13	13	13	12	6	6	5	5	5	5	7	7	5	5	5	4	4	4	4

Source: Competitive matches
A = Away; H = Home; W = Win; D = Draw; L = Loss; = Leader, Promoted to 2001-02 La Liga; = Promoted to 2001-02 La Liga; = Relegated to Segunda División B

==== Matches ====
3 September 2000 1	Levante UD	4–1	Atlético Madrid	Valencia
	Salillas 34'; Roa 52'; Kaiku 69'; Alberto 90'	Report	43' Salva	Stadium: Ciutat de València; Attendance: 10,000; Referee: Bernardino González

9 September 2000 2	Atlético Madrid	0–1	Recreativo Huelva	Madrid
		Report	36' (own goal) J. Gómez	Stadium: Vicente Calderón; Attendance: 45,000; Referee: José Luis Renales

18 September 2000 3	Real Jaén	1–0	Atlético Madrid	Jaén
	Puche 53'	Report		Stadium: La Victoria; Attendance: 11,500; Referee: Antonio Jávega

23 September 2000 4	Atlético Madrid	2–0	SD Compostela	Madrid
	Salva 26'; Salva 85'	Report		Stadium: Vicente Calderón; Attendance: 45,000; Referee: Manuel Ángel Pérez

1 October 2000 5	Real Betis	1–1	Atlético Madrid	Sevilla
	Casas 45'	Report	97' (pen.) Correa	Stadium: Manuel Ruiz de Lopera; Attendance: 30,000; Referee: Fidel Valle

8 October 2000 6	Atlético Madrid	1–1	Racing Ferrol	Madrid
	Correa 47'	Report	46' Jordi	Stadium: Vicente Calderón; Attendance: 40,000; Referee: Pedro Tristante Oliva

14 October 2000 7	CD Badajoz	0–0	Atlético Madrid	Badajoz
		Report		Stadium: Nuevo Vivero; Attendance: 5,000; Referee: Francisco Javier Muñoz Juste

21 October 2000 8	Atlético Madrid	2–0	Elche CF	Madrid
	Correa 10' (rig); Juan Carlos 59'	Report		Stadium: Vicente Calderón; Attendance: 40,000; Referee: Xabier Eleicegui Uranga

29 October 2000 9	Atlético Madrid	1–1	Córdoba CF	Madrid
	Cubillo 85'	Report	90+3' Melgar	Stadium: Vicente Calderón; Attendance: 50,000; Referee: Francisco Manuel Arcas Piqueres

1 November 2000 10	Universidad Las Palmas	2–1	Atlético Madrid	Las Palmas de Gran Canaria
	Jonathan 8'; Prieto 47'	Report	71' (rig) Correa	Stadium: Alfonso Silva; Attendance: 7,000; Referee: Xavier Moreno Delgado

5 November 2000 11	Atlético Madrid	1–2	CD Tenerife	Madrid
	Aguilera 48'	Report	58', 72' Luis García	Stadium: Vicente Calderón; Attendance: 25,000; Referee: Bernardino González Vázquez

11 November 2000 12	CF Extremadura	0–1	Atlético Madrid	Almendralejo
		Report	13' Correa	Stadium: Francisco de la Hera; Attendance: 6,000; Referee: José Luis Paradas Romero

18 November 2000 13	Atlético Madrid	1–1	SD Eibar	Madrid
	Salva 21'	Report	70' Sendoa	Stadium: Vicente Calderón; Attendance: 40,000; Referee: Jesús Téllez Sánchez

26 November 2000 14	Real Murcia	1–1	Atlético Madrid	Murcia
	Loreto 65'	Report	27' Hugo Leal	Stadium: La Condomina; Attendance: 17,000; Referee: Miguel Carlos Román González

2 December 2000 15	Atlético Madrid	3–0	UD Salamanca	Madrid
	Salva 14', 83'; Aguilera 38'	Report		Stadium: Vicente Calderón; Attendance: 40,000; Referee: Fernando Teixeira Vitienes

10 December 2000 16	Sevilla CF	3–1	Atlético Madrid	Sevilla
	Salas 36'; Olivera 44'; Diego	Report	72' Salva	Stadium: Ramón Sánchez-Pizjuán; Attendance: 30,000; Referee: Emilio María Navas Lasa

17 December 2000 17	Atlético Madrid	3–2	UE Lleida	Madrid
	Aguilera 28'; Salva 38' (rig), 49'	Report	15' Álvarez; 48' Lusarreta	Stadium: Vicente Calderón; Attendance: 45,000; Referee: Eduardo Pérez Izquierdo

21 December 2000 18	CD Leganés	1–2	Atlético Madrid	Leganés
21:30	Macanás 30'	Report	36' Hibić; 69' Salva	Stadium: Butarque; Attendance: 4,000; Referee: Emilio José Rubio Iniesta

7 January 2001 19	Atlético Madrid	0–0	Albacete Balompié	Madrid
		Report		Stadium: Vicente Calderón; Attendance: 30,000; Referee: José Luis Bello Rebolo

14 January 2001 20	Sporting Gijón	1–0	Atlético Madrid	Gijón
	Soto 72'	Report		Stadium: El Molinón; Attendance: 17,000; Referee: Manuel Ángel Pérez Lima

20 January 2001 21	Atlético Madrid	2–1	Getafe CF	Madrid
	Roberto F. 70'; Hugo Leal 76'	Report	63' Nzinkeu	Stadium: Vicente Calderón; Attendance: 42,000; Referee: Xavier Moreno Delgado

27 January 2001 22	Atlético Madrid	1–1	Levante UD	Madrid
	Aguilera 39'	Report	67' (rig) Saavedra	Stadium: Vicente Calderón; Attendance: 35,000; Referee: Alexis Pérez

3 February 2001 23	Recreativo Huelva	1–1	Atlético Madrid	Huelva
	David 56'	Report	89' Mena	Stadium: Colombino; Attendance: 14,000; Referee: Ángel Rodado Rodríguez

11 February 2001 24	Atlético Madrid	5–0	Real Jaén	Madrid
	Njeguš 12', 90'; Hugo Leal 56'; Correa 61'; Salva 68' (rig)	Report		Stadium: Vicente Calderón; Attendance: 50,000; Referee: Francisco Manuel Arcas Piqueres

17 February 2001 25	SD Compostela	2–3	Atlético Madrid	Santiago de Compostela
	Gudelj 25', 35'	Report	60' Luque; 63' (aut) Pinillos; 90+1' Hugo Leal	Stadium: San Lázaro; Attendance: 5,000; Referee: Emilio María Navas Lasa

25 February 2001 26	Atlético Madrid	2–1	Real Betis	Madrid
	Aguilera 19'; Dani 63'	Report	36' Arzu	Stadium: Vicente Calderón; Attendance: 56,000; Referee: Miguel Carlos Román González

4 March 2001 27	Racing Ferrol	0–2	Atlético Madrid	Ferrol
17:00		Report	83' Correa; 90' Salva	Stadium: A Malata; Attendance: 10,000; Referee: Alfonso Pino Zamorano

10 March 2001 28	Atlético Madrid	2–0	CD Badajoz	Madrid
	Dani 36', 58'	Report		Stadium: Vicente Calderón; Attendance: 50,000; Referee: Antonio Jávega Jiménez

17 March 2001 29	Elche CF	2–1	Atlético Madrid	Elche
	Benja 31'; Șerban 46'	Report	59' Salva	Stadium: Manuel Martínez Valero; Attendance: 28,000; Referee: Xavier Moreno Delgado

24 March 2001 30	Córdoba CF	1–1	Atlético Madrid	Córdoba
	Gallego 91'	Report	19' Salva	Stadium: Nuevo Arcángel; Attendance: 15,500; Referee: Fernando Teixeira

31 March 2001 31	Atlético Madrid	2–0	Universidad Las Palmas	Madrid
	Salva 63'; Carlos Aguilera 92'	Report		Stadium: Vicente Calderón; Attendance: 45,000; Referee: Xabier Eleicegui

8 April 2001 32	CD Tenerife	1–2	Atlético Madrid	Santa Cruz de Tenerife
	Luis García 68' (pen.)	Report	6' Luque; 74' Hibić	Stadium: Heliodoro Rodríguez López; Attendance: 23,000; Referee: Eduardo Pérez

15 April 2001 33	Atlético Madrid	2–0	CF Extremadura	Madrid
	Salva 65', 85' (pen.)	Report		Stadium: Vicente Calderón; Attendance: 54,000; Referee: Manuel Ángel Pérez

22 April 2001 34	SD Eibar	2–1	Atlético Madrid	Eibar
	Léniz 28'; Arenaza 35'	Report	72' Salva	Stadium: Ipurúa; Attendance: 5,000; Referee: José Luis Bello

28 April 2001 35	Atlético Madrid	0–3	Real Murcia	Madrid
		Report	26' Zárate; 63' Loreto; 80' Luis Gil	Stadium: Vicente Calderón; Attendance: 50,000; Referee: Jesús Téllez

6 May 2001 36	UD Salamanca	1–3	Atlético Madrid	Villares de la Reina
	Toedtli 64'	Report	3' Luque; 29' Salva; 85' Dani	Stadium: El Helmántico; Attendance: 9,214; Referee: Bernardino González

12 May 2001 37	Atlético Madrid	2–0	Sevilla CF	Madrid
	Salva 56'; Roberto F. 69'	Report		Stadium: Vicente Calderón; Attendance: 53,000; Referee: Emilio Rubio

20 May 2001 38	UE Lleida	1–1	Atlético Madrid	Lleida
	Renaldo 43'	Report	71' Correa	Stadium: Camp d'Esports; Attendance: 6,000; Referee: Francisco Manuel Arcas

27 May 2001 39	Atlético Madrid	1–0	CD Leganés	Madrid
	Luque 54'	Report		Stadium: Vicente Calderón; Attendance: 35,000; Referee: Emilio Navas

3 June 2001 40	Albacete Balompié	0–1	Atlético Madrid	Albacete
		Report	80' F. Torres	Stadium: Carlos Belmonte; Attendance: 16,500; Referee: Francisco Javier Muñoz

10 June 2001 41	Atlético Madrid	1–0	Sporting Gijón	Madrid
	Luque 69'	Report		Stadium: Vicente Calderón; Attendance: 55,000; Referee: José Luis Parada

17 June 2001 42	Getafe CF	0–1	Atlético Madrid	Getafe
		Report	27' Luque	Stadium: Coliseum Alfonso Pérez; Attendance: 14,000; Referee: Antonio Jávega

=== Copa del Rey ===
==== Round of 64 ====
13 December 2000 1	Atlético Madrid	1–0	UD Salamanca	Madrid
	Salva 23'	Report		Stadium: Vicente Calderón; Attendance: 18,000; Referee: Fidel Valle

==== Round of 32 ====
3 January 2001 1	Atlético Madrid	3–1	Osasuna	Madrid
	J. Gómez 45'; Correa 54', 80'	Report	75' Armentano	Stadium: Vicente Calderón; Attendance: 6,000; Referee: Julián Rodríguez

==== Eightfinals ====
11 January 2001 1	Atlético Madrid	2–2	Rayo Vallecano	Madrid
	Salva 21', 25'	Report	69' Quevedo; 85' De Quintana	Stadium: Vicente Calderón; Attendance: 15,000; Referee: Rafael Ramírez

17 January 2001 2	Rayo Vallecano	0–2	Atlético Madrid	Madrid
		Report	16' Salva; 78' Kiko	Stadium: Teresa Rivero; Attendance: 16,000; Referee: Alfonso Pérez

==== Quarterfinals ====
31 January 2001 1	Granada CF	0–1	Atlético Madrid	Granada
		Report	40' Correa	Stadium: Los Cármenes; Attendance: 15,000; Referee: Xabier Eleicegui

6 February 2001 2	Atlético Madrid	3–1	Granada CF	Madrid
	Salva 31', 74'; Dani 53'	Report	75' Puntas	Stadium: Vicente Calderón; Attendance: 20,000; Referee: Jesús Téllez

==== Semifinals ====
20 June 2001 1	Atlético Madrid	0–2	Real Zaragoza	Madrid
		Report	28' Acuña; 69' Jamelli	Stadium: Vicente Calderón; Attendance: 25,000; Referee: Fernando Carmona

23 June 2001 2	Real Zaragoza	0–1 (2–1 agg.)	Atlético Madrid	Zaragoza
		Report	29' Fagiani	Stadium: La Romareda; Attendance: 30,000; Referee: José Losantos

== Statistics ==
=== Squad statistics ===
Competition	Points	Total						GD
Competition	Points	G	W	D	L	GS	GR	GD
2000–01 Segunda División	74	42	21	11	10	59	39	+20
2000–01 Copa del Rey	–	8	6	1	1	13	6	+7
Total	74	50	27	12	11	72	45	+27

=== Players statistics ===
No.	Pos	Nat	Player	Total		Segunda Division		Copa del Rey	
No.	Pos	Nat	Player	Apps	Goals	Apps	Goals	Apps	Goals
1	GK	(Spain) ESP	Toni	34	-30	30	-27	4	-3
15	DF	(Spain) ESP	Carlos Aguilera	46	6	34+5	6	4+3	0
6	DF	(Spain) ESP	Santi	27	0	20+3	0	4	0
23	DF	(Bosnia and Herzegovina) BIH	Hibic	33	2	30	2	3	0
14	DF	(Federal Republic of Yugoslavia) YUG	Njegus	32	2	23+3	2	6	0
7	MF	(Argentina) ARG	Juan Gomez	42	1	36	0	5+1	1
20	MF	(Portugal) POR	Hugo Leal	43	4	33+3	4	6+1	0
16	MF	(Spain) ESP	Luque	36	5	19+11	5	5+1	0
9	FW	(Spain) ESP	Salva	41	27	33	21	8	6
10	FW	(Uruguay) URU	Correa	44	11	26+12	8	4+2	3
19	FW	(Spain) ESP	Kiko	36	1	20+12	0	4	1
13	GK	(Spain) ESP	Sergio Sanchez	16	-15	12	-12	4	-3
25	DF	(Argentina) ARG	Fagiani	26	1	20+2	0	3+1	1
8	MF	(Argentina) ARG	Óscar Mena	24	1	15+4	1	4+1	0
2	DF	(Spain) ESP	Amaya	19	0	15	0	4	0
18	MF	(Spain) ESP	Roberto	25	2	9+11	2	3+2	0
21	MF	(Portugal) POR	Dani	23	5	10+9	4	2+2	1
17	DF	(France) FRA	Hernandez	16	0	11+3	0	2	0
25	DF	(Spain) ESP	Llorens	12	0	12	0		
22	FW	(Spain) ESP	Juan Carlos	14	1	8+4	1	0+2	0
4	MF	(Switzerland) SUI	Wicky	13	0	8+3	0	1+1	0
24	MF	(Spain) ESP	Carcedo	16	0	7+4	0	4+1	0
28	MF	(Spain) ESP	Cubillo	14	1	4+8	1	0+2	0
3	DF	(Spain) ESP	Toni Muñoz	13	0	7+1	0	4+1	0
4	DF	(Spain) ESP	Gaspar	7	0	7	0		
11	FW	(Spain) ESP	Jordi Lardín	9	0	5+4	0		
12	FW	(Nigeria) NGA	Lawal	10	0	1+5	0	2+2	0
21	MF	(Federal Republic of Yugoslavia) YUG	Paunovic	5	0	2+3	0		
35	FW	(Spain) ESP	Fernando Torres	6	1	1+3	1	0+2	0
5	DF	(Spain) ESP	Juanma López	3	0	2+1	0		
26	MF	(Spain) ESP	Zahinos	2	0	1+1	0		
29	DF	(Spain) ESP	Antonio Lopez	2	0	1+1	0		
30	MF	(Spain) ESP	Carlos	2	0	0+2	0		

- Source: https://www.bdfutbol.com/es/t/t2000-017.html
