= Lucas Hernandez =

French footballer (born 1996)

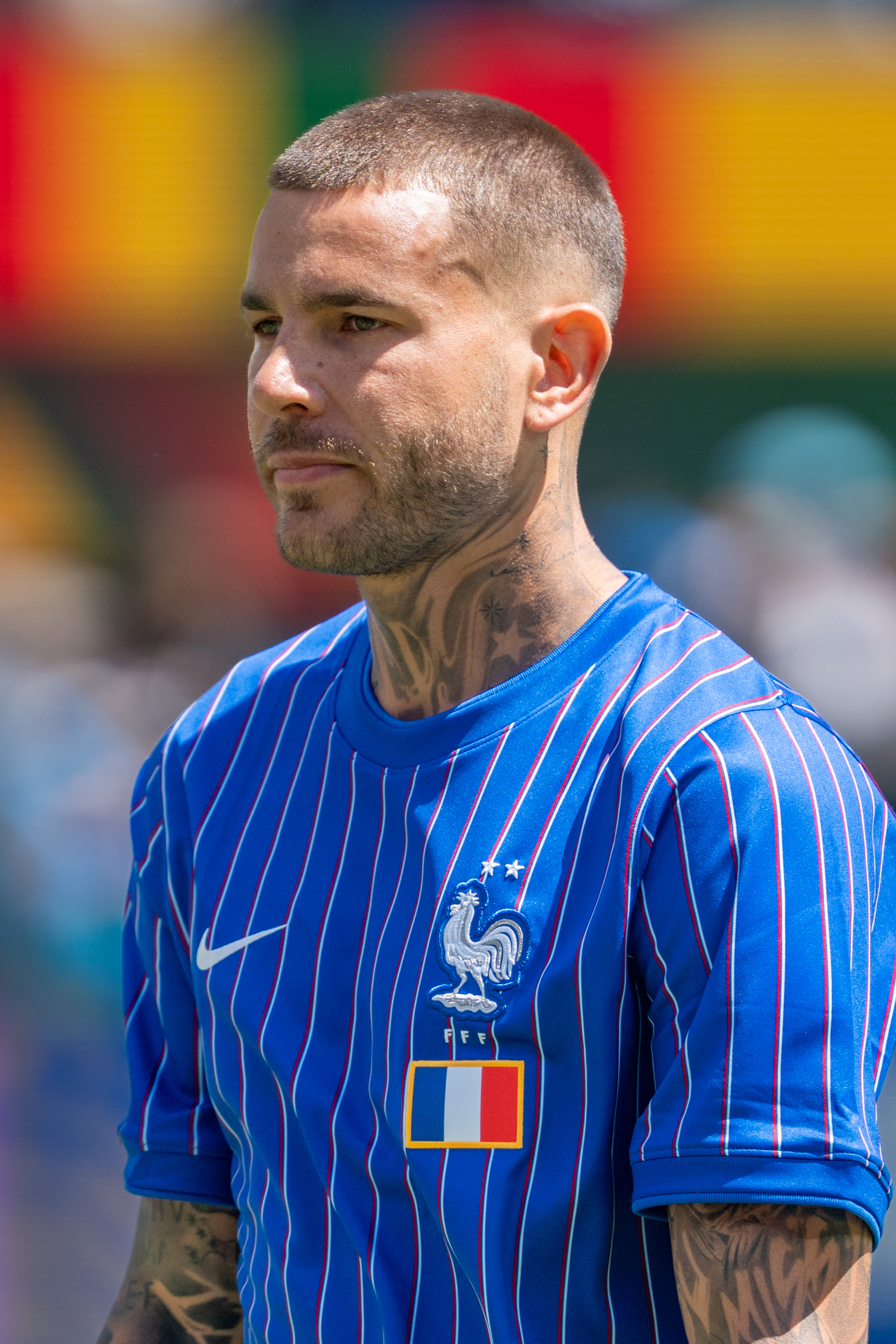
- Hernandez with France in 2026

Personal information
- Full name: Lucas François Bernard Hernandez
- Date of birth: 14 February 1996 (age 30)
- Place of birth: Marseille, Bouches-du-Rhône, France
- Height: 1.84 m (6 ft 0 in)
- Positions: Centre-back; left-back

Team information
- Current team: Paris Saint-Germain
- Number: 21

Youth career
- 2002–2007: Rayo Majadahonda
- 2007–2014: Atlético Madrid

Senior career*
Years	Team	Apps	(Gls)
2014–2015	Atlético Madrid B	21	(1)
2014–2019	Atlético Madrid	67	(1)
2019–2023	Bayern Munich	74	(0)
2023–	Paris Saint-Germain	76	(1)

International career^{‡}
2012	France U16	1	(0)
2014	France U18	2	(0)
2014–2015	France U19	13	(0)
2015	France U20	3	(0)
2016–2017	France U21	9	(0)
2018–	France	42	(0)
Medal record
Men's football
Representing France
FIFA World Cup
Winner	2018 Russia
Runner-up	2022 Qatar
UEFA Nations League
Winner	2021 Italy
Third place	2025 Germany
- * Club domestic league appearances and goals as of 18:00, 21 November 2026 (UTC) ‡ National team caps and goals as of 21:10, 4 June 2026 (UTC)

Lucas François Bernard Hernandez (French pronunciation: [lukas ɛʁnɑ̃dɛz, - ɛʁnandɛs]; born 14 February 1996) is a French professional footballer who plays as a centre-back or left-back for Ligue 1 club Paris Saint-Germain and the France national team.

Born in France, Hernandez moved to Spain at the age of four and started his career with Atlético Madrid, where he made more than 100 competitive appearances, reaching the 2016 UEFA Champions League final. He also won the 2018 Europa League and the Super Cup in the same year. He signed for Bayern in 2019, winning the Bundesliga, DFB-Pokal, and Champions League in his first season as part of a treble. Hernandez returned to his home country and joined Paris Saint-Germain in 2023, where he won the Champions League again to complete a second treble in 2025.

A French international since 2018, Hernandez was part of the winning squad at the 2018 FIFA World Cup, and also participated at UEFA Euro 2020 and the 2022 and 2026 FIFA World Cups. He is the older brother of fellow professional footballer Théo Hernandez and the son of retired footballer Jean-François Hernandez.

== Club career ==
=== Atlético Madrid ===
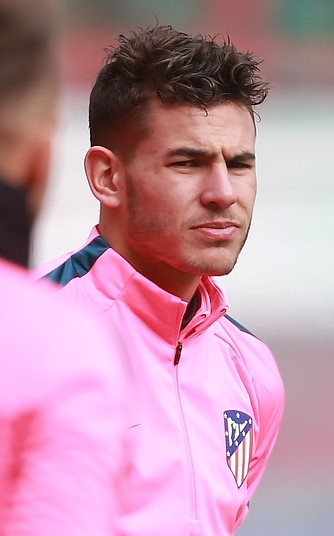
Hernandez with Atlético Madrid

Born in Marseille, Bouches-du-Rhône, while his father Jean-François Hernandez was playing for Marseille, Hernandez moved to Spain at age four (as a result, he would later speak French with a slight Spanish accent), and joined Atlético Madrid's youth setup in 2007 at age 11 from Rayo Majadahonda. On 9 November 2013, while still a junior, he was called up by manager Diego Simeone for a La Liga match against Villarreal, but remained unused in the 1–1 away draw on the following day.

Hernandez made his senior debut on 26 April 2014, starting for the reserves in a 0–1 away loss against Real Sociedad B in the Segunda División B. He appeared in three further matches during the season, as they narrowly avoided relegation; he also signed a new deal with the club in June, running until 2018.

Hernandez made his first-team debut on 3 December 2014, playing the full 90 minutes in a 3–0 away success over L'Hospitalet in the campaign's Copa del Rey. His maiden appearance in the Spanish top level took place on the 21st, when he came on as a late substitute for Guilherme Siqueira in a 4–1 away win against Athletic Bilbao.

==== 2015–16 season ====
On 10 August 2015, Hernandez renewed his contract until 2019 and was definitively promoted to the main squad. His maiden appearance in the UEFA Champions League took place on 15 March 2016, as he replaced injured Diego Godín for extra time of the round-of-16 tie against PSV (0–0 after 120 minutes, 8–7 penalty shootout win); he entered at the same point in the final, a shootout loss to neighbours Real Madrid in the San Siro on 28 May.

==== 2016–17 season ====
On 6 August 2016, Hernandez signed a contract extension with Atlético until 30 June 2020. He played a more important role for Atlético during the 2016-17 season. Hernandez played in 22 matches in all competitions during the season. He was in the starting lineup in 20 of these matches.

==== 2017–18 season ====
During the 2017–18 season, Hernandez was a key member of the team as he played in 44 matches in all competitions. Atlético reached the 2018 UEFA Europa League final. He started and played the whole match against French club Marseille. Atlético won the match 3–0 and Hernandez won his first international trophy.

==== 2018–19 season ====
Hernandez scored his first goal as a professional on 19 January 2019, in a 3–0 away defeat of Huesca. On 27 March 2019, Atlético confirmed that Hernandez would leave the club in the summer of 2019. Atlético confirmed they offered Hernandez a contract extension, but he decided to sign for Bundesliga club Bayern Munich. Atlético said that the German club activated Hernandez's release clause of €80 million.

During the medical examination by Bayern Munich medical staff, a damage to the medial collateral ligament in Hernandez's right knee was found. The injury required a surgical repair. On 28 March 2019, Hernandez had a successful operation on his right knee. The operation ended Hernandez's season with Atlético. Hernandez played in 14 La Liga matches and scored one goal. In all competitions, he played in 22 matches and scored one goal.

On 12 October 2019, Hernandez's former coach at Atlético, Diego Simeone, said in an interview with Marca that the left back's departure to Bayern had hurt Atlético a great deal: "The exit that hurt us the most was Lucas, who was a boy from the academy ... [It hurt] More than [Antoine] Griezmann," who left Atlético at the same time for Barcelona.

=== Bayern Munich ===
On 27 March 2019, Bayern Munich announced that Hernandez would join the club on 1 July 2019 for a club record (and Bundesliga record) fee of €80 million, signing a five-year contract lasting until 2024. He made his debut for Bayern on 10 August in a first round match against Energie Cottbus in the DFB-Pokal as an 89th-minute substitute.

On 23 August 2020, along with his Bayern Munich teammates, Hernandez became a Champions League winner after a 1–0 victory over Paris Saint-Germain (PSG) in the final. On 3 November 2020, Hernandez scored his first goal for Bayern Munich in a 6–2 away win over Red Bull Salzburg in the Champions League. In April 2021, Bayern were eliminated from the European competition in the quarter-finals by Paris Saint-Germain on away goal rule after a 3–3 draw on aggregate.

Hernandez missed three league matches at the start of the 2021–22 due to a knee injury sustained during the postponed Euro 2020. However, he was part of the team which reached the quarter-finals of the Champions League before losing to Villarreal 2–1 on aggregate.

On 13 September 2022, Hernandez scored his first goal of the 2022–23 season from a header in a 2–0 win over Barcelona in the Champions League. Two months later, he sustained a cruciate ligament rupture in his right knee during the 2022 FIFA World Cup, which sidelined him for the rest of the season.

=== Paris Saint-Germain ===
On 9 July 2023, Hernandez signed for Ligue 1 club Paris Saint-Germain on a five-year contract until 30 June 2028, for a transfer fee reported to be in the region of €40 million. He made his debut in a 0–0 draw against Lorient at the Parc des Princes on 12 August.

On 4 October 2023, Hernandez scored his first PSG goal, a header in a 4–1 Champions League defeat away to Newcastle United. On 25 October 2023, Hernandez for the first time faced his younger brother, Théo, as an opponent playing competitive senior football in the Champions League group stage home game against AC Milan, a 3–0 win for PSG.

In the first leg of the Champions League semi-finals away to Borussia Dortmund on 1 May 2024, Hernandez tore his anterior cruciate ligament (ACL) in his left knee, ruling him out for the rest of the season.

== International career ==
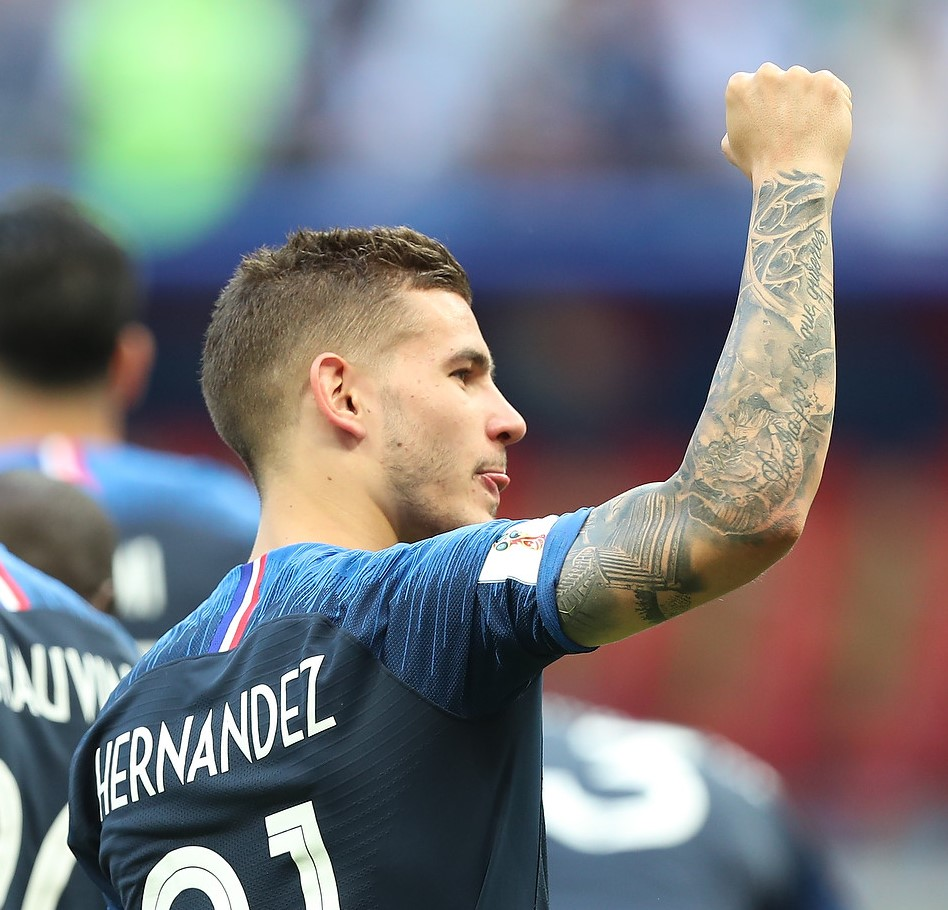
Hernandez playing for France at the 2018 FIFA World Cup

Hernandez earned his first cap for France on 6 March 2012, playing the full 90 minutes for the under-16 team in 1–1 friendly draw against Italy at Coverciano. In 2014, he also appeared with the under-18 and under-19 sides. The following year, he was selected for 2015 UEFA European Under-19 Championship Team of the Tournament for his performances.

Having grown up in Spain, Hernandez was in the process of acquiring Spanish nationality in 2018 to become eligible for the Spain national team. In an interview in March 2018, Hernandez indicated that he might play for Spain stating: "I feel Spanish, Spain has given me everything and if they call me then I will go with them." However the process of getting citizenship was complicated by an ongoing legal case involving his then-girlfriend.

That same month, Hernandez was called up to the French senior team by manager Didier Deschamps for friendlies with Colombia and Russia. He made his debut against the former, replacing Lucas Digne for the last 14 minutes of the 2–3 loss in Paris. Hernandez was selected for the 2018 FIFA World Cup. He made his debut in the competition on 16 June, playing the entire 2–1 group stage win against Australia; he featured in all of the matches for the eventual champions, playing for the full 90 minutes in six of France's seven matches on their way to winning the tournament and came up with two assists, including one to Kylian Mbappe in the final.

In October 2021, ahead of the UEFA Nations League semi-finals against Belgium, Lucas for the first time received a call-up to the national team from Didier Deschamps together with his brother Théo; the two were later fielded in the 3–4–1–2 formation as a left center back and a left wingback, respectively, making it the first time they played together in a senior competitive game, which turned out to be a 3–2 comeback victory for France, with Théo scoring the winning goal in the 90th minute.

Hernandez was selected for France's squad ahead of the 2022 FIFA World Cup but suffered a ruptured anterior cruciate ligament 13 minutes into the first group match against Australia and was subsequently ruled out for the remainder of the tournament. Théo substituted into the match for him after the injury and played out the remainder of France's World Cup 2022 run in his stead.

On 14 May 2026, Hernandez was selected in the 26-man squad for the 2026 FIFA World Cup.

== Personal life ==
Hernandez's father, Jean-François, was also a footballer who played as a centre back. Of Spanish descent, he also played for Atlético Madrid; Hernandez's younger brother, Théo, was also raised at the club, and played in the same position. In an interview with Marca in October 2018, he stated that his family had not heard from their father for 12 or 13 years. In 2022, French newspaper L'Équipe found that Jean-François – who went missing in 2004 – was living in Thailand, and had allegedly been legally blocked by his ex-partner from seeing their children. On 25 July 2026, Hernandez married Brazilian model and influencer Victoria Triay at the Vaux-de-Cernay Abbey in Yvelines, France. The ceremony was attended by several footballers, including Kylian Mbappé and Achraf Hakimi.

=== Legal troubles ===
On 3 February 2017, Hernandez was arrested on suspicion of assaulting his girlfriend, who was also summoned to appear in court. Both Hernandez and his girlfriend, Amelia Llorente, were sentenced to 31 days of community service, while Hernandez was also served with a restraining order preventing him from being within 500 metres of Llorente.

Hernandez was arrested again in June of the same year for violating the restraining order after he and Llorente landed together in Madrid, returning from their honeymoon. For this violation, on 13 October 2021, Hernandez was sentenced to six-months in prison by a Spanish court; Hernandez successfully appealed his sentence and was instead given a four-year suspended sentence and ordered to pay a €96,000 fine.

In February 2026, Hernandez and his wife denied legal claims that they had trafficked and overworked a Colombian family in their employ.

=== Club ownership ===
In August 2026, Hernandez became an investor and shareholder in the investment group that acquired 90% of Portuguese club Estrela da Amadora for €40 million, alongside Thomas Müller, Mats Hummels and Yann Sommer.

== Career statistics ==
=== Club ===
As of match played 21 November 2026

Appearances and goals by club, season and competition
Club	Season	League			National cup (Note: Includes Copa del Rey, DFB-Pokal, Coupe de France)		Europe		Other		Total	
Club	Season	Division	Apps	Goals	Apps	Goals	Apps	Goals	Apps	Goals	Apps	Goals
Atlético Madrid	2014–15	La Liga	1	0	3	0	0	0	0	0	4	0
Atlético Madrid	2015–16	La Liga	10	0	2	0	4 (Note: Appearances in UEFA Champions League)	0	—		16	0
Atlético Madrid	2016–17	La Liga	15	0	5	0	4	0	—		24	0
Atlético Madrid	2017–18	La Liga	27	0	6	0	11 (Note: Three appearances in UEFA Champions League, eight appearances in UEFA Europa League)	0	—		44	0
Atlético Madrid	2018–19	La Liga	14	1	2	0	5	0	1 (Note: Appearance in UEFA Super Cup)	0	22	1
Atlético Madrid	Total		67	1	18	0	24	0	1	0	110	1
Bayern Munich	2019–20	Bundesliga	19	0	3	0	3	0	0	0	25	0
Bayern Munich	2020–21	Bundesliga	23	0	1	0	10	1	3 (Note: One appearance in UEFA Super Cup, one appearance in DFL-Supercup, one appearance in FIFA Club World Cup)	0	37	1
Bayern Munich	2021–22	Bundesliga	25	0	1	0	8	0	0	0	34	0
Bayern Munich	2022–23	Bundesliga	7	0	1	0	2	1	1 (Note: Appearance in DFL-Supercup)	0	11	1
Bayern Munich	Total		74	0	6	0	23	2	4	0	107	2
Paris Saint-Germain	2023–24	Ligue 1	27	1	2	0	11	1	1 (Note: Appearance in Trophée des Champions)	0	41	2
Paris Saint-Germain	2024–25	Ligue 1	16	0	4	0	5	0	4 (Note: Appearances in FIFA Club World Cup)	0	29	0
Paris Saint-Germain	2025–26	Ligue 1	25	0	1	0	10	0	0	0	36	0
Paris Saint-Germain	2026–27	Ligue 1	8	0	0	0	4	1	1	0	13	1
Paris Saint-Germain	Total		76	1	7	0	30	2	6	0	119	3
Career total			217	2	31	0	77	4	11	0	336	6

=== International ===
As of match played 4 June 2026

Appearances and goals by national team and year
National team	Year	Apps	Goals
France	2018	15	0
France	2019	2	0
France	2020	5	0
France	2021	8	0
France	2022	3	0
France	2023	3	0
France	2024	1	0
France	2025	3	0
France	2026	2	0
Total		42	0

== Honours ==
Atlético Madrid

- UEFA Europa League: 2017–18
- UEFA Super Cup: 2018

Bayern Munich

- Bundesliga: 2019–20, 2020–21, 2021–22, 2022–23
- DFB-Pokal: 2019–20
- DFL-Supercup: 2020, 2022
- UEFA Champions League: 2019–20
- UEFA Super Cup: 2020
- FIFA Club World Cup: 2020

Paris Saint-Germain

- Ligue 1: 2023–24, 2024–25, 2025–26
- Coupe de France: 2023–24, 2024–25
- Trophée des Champions: 2023, 2024, 2025
- UEFA Champions League: 2024–25, 2025–26
- UEFA Super Cup: 2025, 2026
- FIFA Intercontinental Cup: 2025
- FIFA Club World Cup runner-up: 2025

France

- FIFA World Cup: 2018; runner-up: 2022
- UEFA Nations League: 2020–21; third place: 2024–25

Individual

- UEFA European Under-19 Championship Team of the Tournament: 2015

Orders

- Knight of the Legion of Honour: 2018
