= List of international goals scored by Fernando Torres =

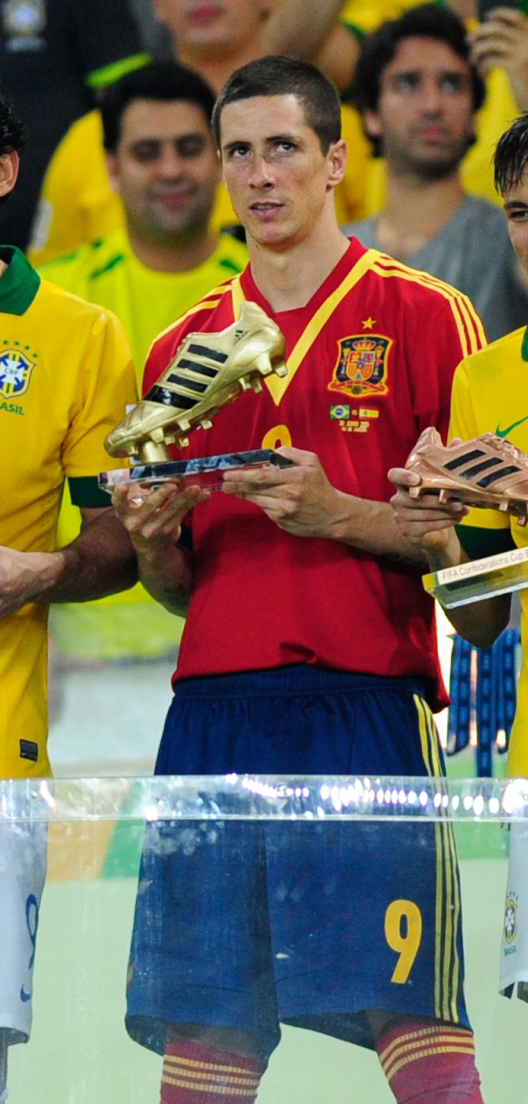
Fernando Torres with the 2013 FIFA Confederations Cup Golden Boot award

Fernando Torres is a former professional footballer who represented the Spain national team 110 times and scored 38 goals between his international debut in 2003 and his final match in 2014. He is currently the third-top scorer in the history of the national team, with only David Villa (59) and Raúl (44) having scored more goals for the country. Spain never lost a match in which Torres scored.

Having represented Spain at various youth levels, Torres made his senior debut on 6 September 2003 against Portugal, and scored his first goal in a friendly match against Italy on 28 April 2004. During qualification for the 2006 FIFA World Cup, Torres scored seven goals in eleven appearances to help Spain qualify for the tournament. At the tournament proper, he scored three goals, including a brace against Tunisia, as Spain were eliminated by France in the round of 16. Two years later at UEFA Euro 2008, Torres scored the winning goal in the 33rd minute of the final against Germany, ending Spain's run of 44 years without a trophy.

Spain's success at Euro 2008 saw the nation qualify as European champions for the 2009 FIFA Confederations Cup, the curtain-raiser for the 2010 FIFA World Cup to be held in South Africa. Torres scored three goals at the tournament, a hat-trick in Spain's 5–0 win over New Zealand on 14 June. His treble, which was scored within 11 minutes from kick-off, is the fastest hat-trick scored in the competition's history. He failed to score at the World Cup a year later but was part of the Spain squad which won the tournament, featuring as a late substitute in the final.

In 2012, Torres was selected for Spain's UEFA Euro 2012 squad and won the Golden Boot award for his three goals scored at the tournament. He scored twice against the Republic of Ireland in the group stage before converting the third goal in a 4–0 win over Italy in the final. Torres' goal against the Italians was his second in the final of a European Championship. The following year, Torres scored five goals at the 2013 FIFA Confederations Cup. His tally, which included a four-goal haul against Tahiti, earned him another Golden Boot award. He was then included in Spain's squad for the 2014 FIFA World Cup in Brazil, and scored against Australia in a 3–0 group stage victory. It was a dead rubber match for Spain, however, as their elimination from the competition had already been confirmed.

Of Torres' 38 international goals, ten were scored in friendlies, eight at the FIFA Confederations Cup, seven during FIFA World Cup qualifiers, five at the UEFA European Championship finals, and four in both the European Championship qualifiers and the World Cup finals.

== International goals ==
Spain score listed first, score column indicates score after each Torres goal.

International goals by date, venue, cap, opponent, score, result and competition
| No. | Date | Venue | Cap | Opponent | Score | Result | Competition | Ref. |
|---|---|---|---|---|---|---|---|---|
| 1 | 28 April 2004 | Stadio Luigi Ferraris, Genoa, Italy | 5 | Italy | 1–0 | 1–1 | Friendly | |
| 2 | 9 February 2005 | Estadio de los Juegos Mediterráneos, Almería, Spain | 15 | San Marino | 2–0 | 5–0 | 2006 FIFA World Cup qualification | |
| 3 | 26 March 2005 | Helmántico, Villares de la Reina, Spain | 16 | China | 1–0 | 3–0 | Friendly | |
| 4 | 8 October 2005 | King Baudouin Stadium, Brussels, Belgium | 23 | Belgium | 1–0 | 2–0 | 2006 FIFA World Cup qualification | |
| 5 | 8 October 2005 | King Baudouin Stadium, Brussels, Belgium | 23 | Belgium | 2–0 | 2–0 | 2006 FIFA World Cup qualification | |
| 6 | 12 October 2005 | Stadio Olimpico, Serravalle, San Marino | 24 | San Marino | 2–0 | 6–0 | 2006 FIFA World Cup qualification | |
| 7 | 12 October 2005 | Stadio Olimpico, Serravalle, San Marino | 24 | San Marino | 5–0 | 6–0 | 2006 FIFA World Cup qualification | |
| 8 | 12 October 2005 | Stadio Olimpico, Serravalle, San Marino | 24 | San Marino | 6–0 | 6–0 | 2006 FIFA World Cup qualification | |
| 9 | 12 November 2005 | Vicente Calderón, Madrid, Spain | 25 | Slovakia | 3–1 | 5–1 | 2006 FIFA World Cup qualification | |
| 10 | 7 June 2006 | Stade de Genève, Carouge, Switzerland | 30 | Croatia | 2–1 | 2–1 | Friendly | |
| 11 | 14 June 2006 | Zentralstadion, Leipzig, Germany | 31 | Ukraine | 4–0 | 4–0 | 2006 FIFA World Cup | |
| 12 | 19 June 2006 | Gottlieb-Daimler-Stadion, Stuttgart, Germany | 32 | Tunisia | 2–1 | 3–1 | 2006 FIFA World Cup | |
| 13 | 19 June 2006 | Gottlieb-Daimler-Stadion, Stuttgart, Germany | 32 | Tunisia | 3–1 | 3–1 | 2006 FIFA World Cup | |
| 14 | 2 September 2006 | Nuevo Vivero, Badajoz, Spain | 36 | Liechtenstein | 1–0 | 4–0 | UEFA Euro 2008 qualification | |
| 15 | 12 September 2007 | Carlos Tartiere, Oviedo, Spain | 45 | Latvia | 2–0 | 2–0 | UEFA Euro 2008 qualification | |
| 16 | 14 June 2008 | Tivoli-Neu, Innsbruck, Austria | 51 | Sweden | 1–0 | 2–1 | UEFA Euro 2008 | |
| 17 | 29 June 2008 | Ernst-Happel-Stadion, Vienna, Austria | 54 | Germany | 1–0 | 1–0 | UEFA Euro 2008 | |
| 18 | 19 November 2008 | El Madrigal, Villarreal, Spain | 58 | Chile | 2–0 | 3–0 | Friendly | |
| 19 | 9 June 2009 | Tofiq Bahramov Stadium, Baku, Azerbaijan | 62 | Azerbaijan | 6–0 | 6–0 | Friendly | |
| 20 | 14 June 2009 | Royal Bafokeng Stadium, Rustenburg, South Africa | 63 | New Zealand | 1–0 | 5–0 | 2009 FIFA Confederations Cup | |
| 21 | 14 June 2009 | Royal Bafokeng Stadium, Rustenburg, South Africa | 63 | New Zealand | 2–0 | 5–0 | 2009 FIFA Confederations Cup | |
| 22 | 14 June 2009 | Royal Bafokeng Stadium, Rustenburg, South Africa | 63 | New Zealand | 3–0 | 5–0 | 2009 FIFA Confederations Cup | |
| 23 | 12 August 2009 | Philip II Arena, Skopje, Macedonia | 68 | Macedonia | 1–2 | 3–2 | Friendly | |
| 24 | 8 June 2010 | Nueva Condomina, Murcia, Spain | 73 | Poland | 5–0 | 6–0 | Friendly | |
| 25 | 3 September 2010 | Rheinpark Stadion, Vaduz, Liechtenstein | 81 | Liechtenstein | 1–0 | 4–0 | UEFA Euro 2012 qualification | |
| 26 | 3 September 2010 | Rheinpark Stadion, Vaduz, Liechtenstein | 81 | Liechtenstein | 3–0 | 4–0 | UEFA Euro 2012 qualification | |
| 27 | 4 June 2011 | Gillette Stadium, Foxborough, United States | 85 | United States | 4–0 | 4–0 | Friendly | |
| 28 | 30 May 2012 | Stade de Suisse, Bern, Switzerland | 92 | South Korea | 1–0 | 4–1 | Friendly | |
| 29 | 14 June 2012 | Arena Gdańsk, Gdańsk, Poland | 95 | Republic of Ireland | 1–0 | 4–0 | UEFA Euro 2012 | |
| 30 | 14 June 2012 | Arena Gdańsk, Gdańsk, Poland | 95 | Republic of Ireland | 3–0 | 4–0 | UEFA Euro 2012 | |
| 31 | 1 July 2012 | Olimpiyskiy National Sports Complex, Kyiv, Ukraine | 98 | Italy | 3–0 | 4–0 | UEFA Euro 2012 | |
| 32 | 20 June 2013 | Estádio do Maracanã, Rio de Janeiro, Brazil | 103 | Tahiti | 1–0 | 10–0 | 2013 FIFA Confederations Cup | |
| 33 | 20 June 2013 | Estádio do Maracanã, Rio de Janeiro, Brazil | 103 | Tahiti | 3–0 | 10–0 | 2013 FIFA Confederations Cup | |
| 34 | 20 June 2013 | Estádio do Maracanã, Rio de Janeiro, Brazil | 103 | Tahiti | 6–0 | 10–0 | 2013 FIFA Confederations Cup | |
| 35 | 20 June 2013 | Estádio do Maracanã, Rio de Janeiro, Brazil | 103 | Tahiti | 9–0 | 10–0 | 2013 FIFA Confederations Cup | |
| 36 | 23 June 2013 | Estádio Castelão, Fortaleza, Brazil | 104 | Nigeria | 2–0 | 3–0 | 2013 FIFA Confederations Cup | |
| 37 | 30 May 2014 | Ramón Sánchez Pizjuán, Seville, Spain | 107 | Bolivia | 1–0 | 2–0 | Friendly | |
| 38 | 21 June 2014 | Arena da Baixada, Curitiba, Brazil | 110 | Australia | 2–0 | 3–0 | 2014 FIFA World Cup | |

== Hat-tricks ==
| No. | Opponent | Goals | Score | Venue | Competition | Date |
|---|---|---|---|---|---|---|
| 1 | San Marino | 3 – (11', 78', 89' pen.) | 6–0 | Stadio Olimpico, Serravalle, San Marino | 2006 FIFA World Cup qualification | 12 October 2005 |
| 2 | New Zealand | 3 – (6', 14', 17') | 5–0 | Royal Bafokeng Stadium, Rustenburg, South Africa | 2009 FIFA Confederations Cup | 14 June 2009 |
| 3 | Tahiti | 4 – (5', 33', 57', 78') | 10–0 | Estádio do Maracanã, Rio de Janeiro, Brazil | 2013 FIFA Confederations Cup | 20 June 2013 |

== Statistics ==
Appearances and goals by year
| Year | Apps | Goals |
|---|---|---|
| 2003 | 3 | 0 |
| 2004 | 11 | 1 |
| 2005 | 12 | 8 |
| 2006 | 13 | 5 |
| 2007 | 6 | 1 |
| 2008 | 13 | 3 |
| 2009 | 13 | 5 |
| 2010 | 11 | 3 |
| 2011 | 9 | 1 |
| 2012 | 10 | 4 |
| 2013 | 5 | 5 |
| 2014 | 4 | 2 |
| Total | 110 | 38 |

Appearances and goals by competition
| Competition | Apps | Goals |
|---|---|---|
| Friendlies | 43 | 10 |
| FIFA Confederations Cup | 9 | 8 |
| FIFA World Cup qualification | 19 | 7 |
| UEFA European Championship | 13 | 5 |
| FIFA World Cup | 14 | 4 |
| UEFA European Championship qualification | 12 | 4 |
| Total | 110 | 38 |

Goals by opponent
| Opponent | Goals |
|---|---|
| San Marino | 4 |
| Tahiti | 4 |
| Liechtenstein | 3 |
| New Zealand | 3 |
| Belgium | 2 |
| Italy | 2 |
| Republic of Ireland | 2 |
| Tunisia | 2 |
| Australia | 1 |
| Azerbaijan | 1 |
| Bolivia | 1 |
| Chile | 1 |
| China | 1 |
| Croatia | 1 |
| Germany | 1 |
| Latvia | 1 |
| Macedonia | 1 |
| Nigeria | 1 |
| Poland | 1 |
| Slovakia | 1 |
| South Korea | 1 |
| Sweden | 1 |
| Ukraine | 1 |
| United States | 1 |
| Total | 38 |

== See also ==
- Spain national football team records and statistics
- FIFA Confederations Cup records
- List of Spain international footballers
