= Salva Ballesta =

Spanish footballer (born 1975)

Salva
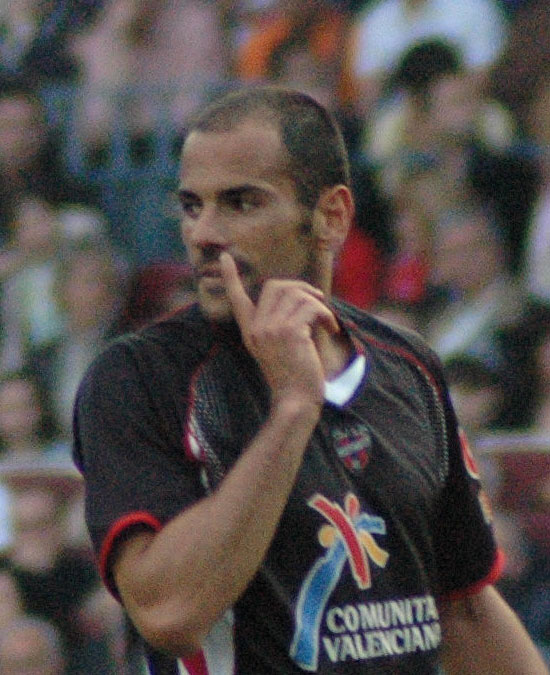
- Salva playing for Levante in 2007

Personal information
- Full name: Salvador Ballesta Vialcho
- Date of birth: 22 May 1975 (age 51)
- Place of birth: Zaragoza, Spain
- Height: 1.84 m (6 ft 0 in)
- Position: Striker

Youth career
- Sevilla

Senior career*
Years	Team	Apps	(Gls)
1994–1996	Sevilla B	36	(10)
1995–1998	Sevilla	49	(15)
1996	→ Écija (loan)	17	(6)
1998–2000	Racing Santander	52	(29)
2000–2001	Atlético Madrid	33	(21)
2001–2005	Valencia	24	(5)
2003	→ Bolton Wanderers (loan)	6	(0)
2003–2004	→ Málaga (loan)	34	(18)
2004–2005	→ Atlético Madrid (loan)	28	(7)
2005–2009	Málaga	87	(28)
2007	→ Levante (loan)	14	(4)
2009–2010	Albacete	23	(5)
Total		403	(148)

International career
1996–1998	Spain U21	9	(2)
1997	Spain U23	4	(2)
2000–2004	Spain	4	(0)

Managerial career
- 2013−2015: Málaga B
- 2017−2018: Jaén
- 2018−2019: Móstoles
- 2020−2021: Algeciras
- 2021–2022: UCAM Murcia
- 2022: San Fernando
- 2024: Estepona
- * Club domestic league appearances and goals

Salvador Ballesta Vialcho (born 22 May 1975), commonly known as Salva, is a Spanish former professional footballer who played as a striker, currently a manager.

A scorer noted for his flair and workrate, he played for seven top-division clubs, most notably Atlético Madrid, Valencia – with whom he won his sole team trophy – and Málaga. He amassed totals of 235 games and 86 goals over 11 La Liga seasons, adding 126 matches and 52 goals in the Segunda División.

Off the field, Salva was known for his nationalistic and militarist viewpoints.

== Club career ==
Salva was born in Zaragoza, Aragon. After making his professional debut with Sevilla, he won the Pichichi Trophy in the 1999–2000 season, scoring 27 goals to lead La Liga's scoring charts for Racing de Santander. He then moved to Segunda División with Atlético Madrid (recently relegated) and proceeded to lead the side with 21 goals, although the Colchoneros did not return to the top flight.

Salva joined Valencia in summer 2001, netting five goals to help the club become league champions after a 31-year drought. He was rarely used the following season, and was subsequently briefly part of the Bolton Wanderers squad that avoided Premier League relegation in 2003. He had another two loan stints from 2003 to 2005, with Málaga for which he scored 21 competitive goals, including a hat-trick in a 5–1 league home win against Barcelona on 3 December 2003, and Atlético Madrid, being subsequently released and signing with the former.

In late January 2007, Salva joined top-tier strugglers Levante on loan from Málaga, now in the second division. On 4 February, he played his first league match for them in an away victory over Real Madrid, scoring the game's only goal. After the season's end, with the Valencians managing to retain their status, he returned to Málaga, and netted seven times to help to promotion.

As he spent most of 2008–09 hampered by recurrent injuries, Salva was still able to contribute, notably coming off the bench against neighbours Almería and helping turn the score from 2–0 to a 3–2 home win with two goals, on 8 February 2009. On 15 March, he added another brace against another neighbouring club, in a 2–2 home draw with former side Sevilla. He was released after his contract expired.

In the dying hours of the 2009 August transfer window, Salva signed a 1+1 deal with Albacete, aged 34. At the end of his first season, where he appeared almost exclusively as a backup, he was one of 14 players who were not offered an extension, being released and retiring shortly after.

== International career ==
Salva played four matches with Spain, the first being a friendly against Poland on 26 January 2000, coming on for Ismael Urzaiz in the 70th minute of an eventual 3–0 win in Cartagena. He earned one of those caps as a member of Atlético Madrid, then in the second tier.

== Coaching career ==
Shortly after retiring, Salva re-joined former team Málaga as a youth coach, alongside former teammate Francesc Arnau. On 11 July 2013, he was appointed as the new manager of Málaga's reserves Atlético Malagueño, in the Tercera División. He left two years later, as his contract was not renewed.

Salva continued working in the lower leagues the following seasons, with Real Jaén, Móstoles, Algeciras, UCAM Murcia and San Fernando.

== Personal life ==
Off the pitch, Salva was notorious for his outspoken personality and his political beliefs, far to the right of most of his peers'. A nationalist who put his love for the "fatherland" over that for his own family, he displayed the nation's flag on his boots; when sent off for Málaga against Osasuna, whose fans include supporters of Basque independence, he shouted to them "¡Que viva España, hijos de puta!" (Long live Spain, sons of bitches!). Fans of Basque team Real Sociedad displayed a banner reading "Salva, muérete" (Salva, die) when he visited their Anoeta Stadium, and he also had a dislike for Barcelona defender Oleguer Presas, an outspoken left-winger and proponent of Catalan independence, saying that he had more respect for "dog crap" than for him.

Although his footballing idol was Real Madrid's Hugo Sánchez, Salva's other heroes included Francoist fighter pilot Joaquín García Morato, Luftwaffe aviator Hans-Ulrich Rudel and Antonio Tejero, leader of the failed "23-F" right-wing coup. A self-declared Christian, he considered himself apolitical.

Born to a family with a military background, Salva stated that he would be the first to serve in the Iraq War if conscripted by prime minister José María Aznar. He was a patron of his hometown's military helicopter school.

In February 2013, Salva learnt that he was being turned down for the assistant coach job at Celta de Vigo over his political views.

== Managerial statistics ==
As of 5 May 2024

Managerial record by team and tenure
Team	Nat	From	To	Record								Ref
Team	Nat	From	To	G	W	D	L	GF	GA	GD	Win %	Ref
Málaga B	(Spain)	12 July 2013	1 June 2015	82	50	15	17	149	77	+72	60.98	
Jaén	(Spain)	26 September 2017	22 February 2018	22	13	3	6	34	17	+17	59.09	
Móstoles	(Spain)	19 June 2018	26 June 2019	42	23	8	11	43	28	+15	54.76	
Algeciras	(Spain)	20 January 2020	17 June 2021	33	14	10	9	37	36	+1	42.42	
UCAM Murcia	(Spain)	9 November 2021	20 March 2022	17	4	4	9	24	28	−4	23.53	
San Fernando	(Spain)	21 September 2022	11 December 2022	12	3	3	6	11	15	−4	25.00	
Estepona	(Spain)	9 April 2024	18 June 2024	4	1	2	1	2	2	+0	25.00	
Total				212	108	45	59	300	203	+97	50.94	—

== Honours ==
Valencia

- La Liga: 2001–02

Spain U21

- UEFA European Under-21 Championship: 1998

Individual

- Pichichi Trophy: 1999–2000
- Pichichi Trophy (Segunda División): 2000–01
