= David Cubillo =

Spanish footballer and manager

Personal information
- Full name: David García Cubillo
- Date of birth: 6 January 1978 (age 48)
- Place of birth: Madrid, Spain
- Height: 1.73 m (5 ft 8 in)
- Position: Midfielder

Youth career
- Atlético Madrid

Senior career*
Years	Team	Apps	(Gls)
1997–2001	Atlético Madrid B	79	(2)
2000–2001	Atlético Madrid	12	(1)
2001–2002	Xerez	37	(3)
2002–2003	Recreativo	24	(2)
2003–2006	Getafe	49	(2)
2006–2008	Rayo Vallecano	64	(3)
2008–2009	Fuenlabrada	19	(4)
2009–2012	Conquense	105	(2)
Total		389	(19)

Managerial career
- 2012–2013: Villanueva Pardillo
- 2013–2014: Puerta Bonita
- 2014–2016: Atlético Madrid (youth)
- 2016–2017: Getafe B (assistant)
- 2017–2018: Getafe B
- 2018–2020: Marbella
- 2020–2021: Hércules
- 2021–2023: Getafe (assistant)
- 2023–2024: Sevilla (assistant)
- * Club domestic league appearances and goals

David García Cubillo (born 6 January 1978 in Madrid) is a Spanish former professional footballer who played as a midfielder. He was also a manager.

== Managerial statistics ==
As of 24 January 2021

Managerial record by team and tenure
Team	Nat	From	To	Record								Ref
Team	Nat	From	To	G	W	D	L	GF	GA	GD	Win %	Ref
Villanueva Pardillo	(Spain)	6 November 2012	30 September 2013	28	21	6	1	68	25	+43	75.00	
Puerta Bonita	(Spain)	30 September 2013	30 June 2014	34	5	13	16	33	49	−16	14.71	
Getafe B	(Spain)	23 May 2017	14 June 2018	42	25	10	7	71	33	+38	59.52	
Marbella	(Spain)	26 December 2018	29 July 2020	51	25	22	4	68	33	+35	49.02	
Hércules	(Spain)	2 August 2020	25 January 2021	11	5	4	2	9	5	+4	45.45	
Total				166	81	55	30	249	145	+104	48.80	—
