= Jean-François Hernandez =

French footballer (born 1969)

Personal information
- Full name: Jean-François Hernandez
- Date of birth: 23 April 1969 (age 57)
- Place of birth: Tours, France
- Height: 1.90 m (6 ft 3 in)
- Position: Centre-back

Youth career
- Toulouse

Senior career*
Years	Team	Apps	(Gls)
1988–1994	Toulouse	148	(3)
1994–1995	Sochaux	29	(0)
1995–1997	Marseille	31	(1)
1998	Compostela	14	(1)
1998–2000	Rayo Vallecano	66	(7)
2000–2001	Atlético Madrid	14	(0)
2001–2002	Rayo Vallecano	15	(2)
Total		317	(14)
- * Club domestic league appearances and goals

Jean-François Hernandez (French pronunciation: [ʒɑ̃ fʁɑ̃swa ɛʁnɑ̃dɛz, - ɛʁnandɛs]; born 23 April 1969) is a French former professional footballer who played as a central defender.

== Club career ==
Born in Tours of Spanish descent, Hernandez played for Toulouse FC, FC Sochaux-Montbéliard and Olympique de Marseille in his own country, amassing Ligue 1 totals of 177 games and three goals in representation of the first two clubs. In the 1995–96 season, he helped the third to promote from Ligue 2 as runners-up.

Hernandez moved to Spain in January 1998, where he spent the remainder of his career. He started out at SD Compostela, making his La Liga debut on the 4th by coming on as a 14th-minute substitute in a 1–1 away draw against Real Oviedo; the Galicians went on to suffer relegation.

The following four years, Hernandez alternated between the top flight and the Segunda División, with Rayo Vallecano and Atlético Madrid. He retired in 2002, at the age of 33.

== Personal life ==
Hernandez's sons, Lucas and Théo, are also footballers. The former stated in October 2018 that they had not had contact with Jean-François in 12 years.

In 2022, French newspaper L'Équipe found that Hernandez – who had not been seen in 18 years – was living in Thailand. Close contacts said that he had attempted to restore contact with his sons, but had been blocked legally by their mother.
