= Alberto Saavedra =

Spanish footballer

Personal information
- Full name: Alberto Saavedra Muñoz
- Date of birth: 29 October 1981 (age 45)
- Place of birth: Oviedo, Spain
- Height: 1.90 m (6 ft 3 in)
- Position: Centre back

Youth career
- 1995–2000: Oviedo

Senior career*
Years	Team	Apps	(Gls)
2001–2003	Oviedo B	85	(4)
2002–2003	Oviedo	4	(0)
2003	Numancia B	5	(0)
2004–2007	Den Haag	81	(1)
2007–2008	Vecindario	17	(0)
2008–2011	Ontinyent	59	(3)
2011	Caudal	16	(0)
2011–2014	Marino	74	(2)
2014–2017	Caudal	77	(8)
2017–2018	Marino	32	(1)
- * Club domestic league appearances and goals

Alberto Saavedra Muñoz (born 29 October 1981) is a Spanish former footballer who played as a central defender.

== Football career ==
Born in Oviedo, Asturias, Saavedra's career began when he signed a professional contract with local Real Oviedo, making his first appearance with the first team in 2002. He never appeared in any La Liga games with the club, and moved to CD Numancia in the 2003–04 season; the Sorians promoted from the second division, but he did not feature one single minute during the half campaign, also being sparingly used by the reserves.

In January 2004, Saavedra moved to the Netherlands, signing a deal with Eredivisie participants ADO Den Haag and quickly becoming a first-team regular. He returned to his homeland in 2007, first with UD Vecindario then Ontinyent CF (both in the third level).

== Personal life ==
Saavedra's older brother, Jesús María Martínez & José Jorge, also a stopper, also played briefly for Oviedo's first team, appearing in one top-flight match in 1998–99. His career, however, was spent largely in the lower leagues.
