= 2002–03 Atlético Madrid season =

97th season in existence of Atlético Madrid

Atlético de Madrid
2002–03 season
- President: Jesús Gil
- Head coach: Luis Aragonés
- Stadium: Vicente Calderón
- La Liga: 12th
- Copa del Rey: Quarter-finals
- Top goalscorer: League: Fernando Torres (13); All: Fernando Torres (14)
Home colours	Away colours

The 2002–03 season was the 97th season in Atlético Madrid's history and their 66th season in La Liga, the top division of Spanish football. It covers a period from 1 July 2002 to 30 June 2003. The season marked the breakthrough of Fernando Torres, the striker making his La Liga debut by the start of the season, scoring 13 league goals as a 18 years-old teenager. Demetrio Albertini was a key signing before the season, the experienced Italian providing a solid display before departing for Lazio in his home country.

== Squad ==
=== Goalkeepers ===
- (Argentina) (Spain) Germán Burgos
- (Spain) Esteban
- (Spain) Juanma

=== Defenders ===
- (Spain) Jorge Otero
- (Bosnia and Herzegovina) Mirsad Hibić
- (Spain) García Calvo
- (Spain) Santi
- (Spain) Sergi
- (Spain) Carreras
- (Spain) Armando
- (Argentina) (Italy) Fabricio Coloccini
- (Romania) (Spain) Cosmin Contra

=== Midfielders ===
- (Spain) Txomin Nagore
- (Spain) José Movilla
- (Italy) Demetrio Albertini
- (Serbia and Montenegro) Jovan Stanković
- (Spain) Carlos Aguilera
- (Brazil) (Portugal) Emerson
- (Spain) Luis García
- (Spain) Jorge Larena

=== Attackers ===
- (Spain) Fernando Torres
- (Portugal) Dani
- (Spain) Javi Moreno
- (Uruguay) (Italy) Fernando Correa
- (Spain) José Mari

=== Transfers ===
==== In ====
- (Spain) José Mari from (Italy) A.C. Milan loan
- (Spain) Javi Moreno from (Italy) A.C. Milan loan
- (Italy) Demetrio Albertini from (Italy) A.C. Milan loan
- (Argentina) (Italy) Fabricio Coloccini from (Italy) A.C. Milan loan
- (Romania) (Spain) Cosmin Contra from (Italy) A.C. Milan loan

== Competitions ==
=== La Liga ===
==== League table ====
Pos	Team	Pld	W	D	L	GF	GA	GD	Pts
10	Sevilla	38	13	11	14	38	39	−1	50
11	Osasuna	38	12	11	15	40	48	−8	47 (Note: OSA 1–0 ATM; ATM 0–1 OSA)
12	Atlético Madrid	38	12	11	15	51	56	−5	47
13	Málaga	38	11	13	14	44	49	−5	46 (Note: VLD 0–0 MLG; MLG 1–0 VLD)
14	Valladolid	38	12	10	16	37	40	−3	46

Source: LFP
Rules for classification: 1st points; 2nd head-to-head points; 3rd head-to-head goal difference; 4th head-to-head away goals scored; 5th goal difference; 6th number of goals scored; 7th Fair-play points

==== Matches ====
1	Barcelona	2–2	Atlético Madrid
	Luis Enrique 5'; Luis Enrique 55'		Jorge Otero 45'; Fernando Correa 86'

2	Atlético Madrid	1–1	Sevilla
	Fernando Torres 58'		Moisés 45' (pen.)

3	Mallorca	0–4	Atlético Madrid
			Fernando Torres 8' (pen.); Fernando Correa 42'; Fernando Torres 52'; Jorge Larena 66'

4	Atlético Madrid	1–1	Recreativo Huelva
	Luis García 34'		Raúl Molina 27'

5	Málaga	3–1	Atlético Madrid
	Julio Dely Valdés 44' (pen.): 2–0 Fernando Sanz 65'; 3–0 Manu 70'		José Mari 90'

6	Atlético Madrid	1–1	Valencia
	Javi Moreno 75'		Mauricio Pellegrino 40'

7	Celta Vigo	0–0	Atlético Madrid

8	Atlético Madrid	2–0	Rayo Vallecano
	García Calvo 5'; Fernando Torres 55' (pen.)

9	Atlético Madrid	3–3	Athletic Bilbao
	José Mari 23'; José Mari 75'; José Mari 90'		Ismael Urzaiz 49'; Ismael Urzaiz 53'; Ismael Urzaiz 82'

10	Espanyol	1–2	Atlético Madrid
	Maxi Rodríguez 48'		Luis García 75'; García Calvo 89'

11	Atlético Madrid	1–0	Betis
	Fernando Torres 13'

12	Osasuna	1–0	Atlético Madrid
	Rivero 62'

13	Atlético Madrid	1–0	Valladolid
	Fernando Torres 61'

14	Alavés	2–0	Atlético Madrid
	Rubén Navarro 12'; Adrian Ilie 31'

15	Atlético Madrid	1–2	Racing Santander
	Emerson 52'		Pedro Munitis 43'; Javi Guerrero 66'

16	Villarreal	4–3	Atlético Madrid
	Unai 26'; Martín Palermo 28'; Víctor 44'; Martín Palermo 90'		Fernando Torres 31'; Santi 42'; Fernando Torres 90'

17	Atlético Madrid	3–1	Deportivo
	José Mari 2'; Fernando Torres 78'; Fernando Correa 80'		Roy Makaay 6'

18	Real Madrid	2–2	Atlético Madrid
	Luís Figo 33'; Luís Figo 44' (pen.)		Javi Moreno 11' (pen.); Demetrio Albertini 90'

19	Atlético Madrid	1–2	Real Sociedad
	Luis García 49'		Tayfun 46'; Darko Kovačević 62'

20	Atlético Madrid	3–0	Barcelona	Madrid
	Fernando Torres 39'; Emerson 69'; García Calvo 88'			Stadium: Estadio Vicente Calderón

21	Sevilla	1–1	Atlético Madrid
	Fredi 53'		Javi Moreno 49'

22	Atlético Madrid	2–1	Mallorca
	José Movilla 14'; Luis García 59'		Álvaro Novo 20'

23	Recreativo Huelva	3–0	Atlético Madrid
	Quique Romero 67'; Xisco 82'; Benítez 84'

24	Atlético Madrid	2–1	Málaga
	Luis García 13'; Fernando Torres 46'		Darío Silva 60'

25	Valencia	0–1	Atlético Madrid
			Carlos Aguilera 72'

26	Atlético Madrid	0–1	Celta Vigo
			Eduardo Berizzo 87'

27	Rayo Vallecano	0–0	Atlético Madrid	Madrid
				Stadium: Campo Vallecas

28	Athletic Bilbao	1–0	Atlético Madrid
	Santiago Ezquerro 83'

29	Atlético Madrid	3–3	Espanyol	Madrid
	Luis García 74'; Mirsad Hibić 86'; Carlos Aguilera 90'		Raúl Tamudo 24'; Alberto Lopo 59'; Cyril Domoraud 76'	Stadium: Estadio Vicente Calderón

30	Betis	2–2	Atlético Madrid
	Alfonso 47'; Arzu 85'		Luis García 27'; Luis García 75'

31	Atlético Madrid	0–1	Osasuna
			Iván Rosado 43'

32	Valladolid	3–1	Atlético Madrid
	Fernando Sales 30'; David Aganzo 50'; David Aganzo 74'		José Mari 64'

33	Atlético Madrid	0–1	Alavés
			Adrian Ilie 55'

34	Racing Santander	0–2	Atlético Madrid
			Javi Moreno 63', 76' (pen.)

35	Atlético Madrid	3–2	Villarreal	Madrid
	Calleja 23'; Torres 70'; Torres 74'		Arruabarrena 30'; Josico 41'	Stadium: Estadio Vicente Calderón

36	Deportivo	3–2	Atlético Madrid	La Coruña
	Enrique Romero 14'; Roy Makaay 78'; Juan Carlos Valerón 85'		Demetrio Albertini 7'; Fernando Correa 77'	Stadium: Estadio Riazor

37	Atlético Madrid	0–4	Real Madrid	Madrid
			Ronaldo 6'; Raúl 18'; Ronaldo 31'; Raúl 70'	Stadium: Estadio Vicente Calderón

38	Real Sociedad	3–0	Atlético Madrid	San Sebastián
	Darko Kovačević 5'; Javier de Pedro 56'; Nihat 74'			Stadium: Estadio Anoeta

== Statistics ==
=== Top scorers ===
Rank	Position	Number	Player	La Liga	Copa del Rey	Total
1	FW	9	(Spain) Fernando Torres	13	1	14
2	MF	20	(Spain) Luis García	9	0	9
3	FW	19	(Spain) Javi Moreno	5	2	7
4	FW	23	(Spain) José Mari	6	0	6
5	FW	10	(Uruguay) Fernando Correa	4	1	5
6	MF	8	(Italy) Demetrio Albertini	2	1	3
6	DF	15	(Spain) Aguilera	2	1	3
8	DF	5	(Spain) García Calvo	2	0	2
8	MF	7	(Spain) Movilla	1	1	2
8	MF	18	(Brazil) Emerson	2	0	2
11	DF	3	(Spain) Jorge Otero	1	0	1
11	DF	4	(Bosnia and Herzegovina) Mirsad Hibić	1	0	1
11	DF	6	(Spain) Santi Denia	1	0	1
11	DF	22	(Argentina) Fabricio Coloccini	0	1	1
11	MF	24	(Spain) Jorge Larena	1	0	1
Own goals				1	0	1
Totals				51	8	59
