= 2001–02 Atlético Madrid season =

96th season in existence of Atlético Madrid

Club Atlético de Madrid
2001–02 season
- President: Jesús Gil
- Head coach: Luis Aragonés
- Stadium: Vicente Calderón
- Segunda División: 1st (promoted to La Liga)
- Copa del Rey: Round of 64
- Top goalscorer: League: Diego Alonso (22); All: Diego Alonso (22)
- Highest home attendance: 58,000 vs Gimnàstic (28 April 2002)
- Lowest home attendance: 25,000 vs Rayo Vallecano (10 October 2001)
- Average home league attendance: 41,630
| Home colours | Away colours | Third colours |

The 2001–02 campaign was the 96th season in Atlético Madrid's history and their 2nd season in Segunda División of Spanish football. Also the club competed in Copa del Rey.

== Summary ==
During the summer, with Paulo Futre as director of football, appointed club legend Luis Aragonés as the new head coach on 31 May 2001. Previously, the former player acted as coach during several seasons in the past: 1974–80, 1982–87 and 1991–93. The main reason for his arrival was clinching the last season a UEFA Champions League spot for underdogs Mallorca, and now had the mission of saving Atletico from the Segunda División. Owing to financial troubles, Futre transferred several players out the squad, including top goalscorer Salva to Valencia in exchange for Uruguayan striker Diego Alonso, and young playmaker Hugo Leal to Paris Saint-Germain, as well as an additional 14 players. The squad was reinforced with four players from Mallorca and more Spanish players in contrast to previous seasons, where the club bought a lot of foreign players.

Finally, on 27 April 2002, the team clinched the promotion to La Liga after two years in the Segunda División. Also, in Copa del Rey, the club was eliminated early by Rayo Vallecano in Round of 64.

== Squad ==
Note: Flags indicate national team as defined under FIFA eligibility rules; some limited exceptions apply. Players may hold more than one non-FIFA nationality.

| No. | Pos. | Nation | Player |
|---|---|---|---|
| 1 | GK | ESP | Sergio |
| 2 | DF | ESP | Txomin Nagore |
| 3 | DF | ESP | Jorge Otero |
| 4 | DF | BIH | Mirsad Hibić |
| 5 | DF | ESP | Iván Amaya |
| 6 | DF | ESP | Santi Denia |
| 7 | MF | ESP | José María Movilla |
| 9 | FW | ESP | Fernando Torres |
| 10 | FW | URU | Fernando Correa |
| 11 | MF | YUG | Jovan Stanković |
| 12 | FW | ESP | Armando Álvarez |
| 13 | GK | ARG | Germán Burgos |
| 14 | MF | POR | Dani |

| No. | Pos. | Nation | Player |
|---|---|---|---|
| 15 | DF | ESP | Carlos Aguilera |
| 16 | MF | ESP | José Juan Luque |
| 17 | DF | ESP | Lluís Carreras |
| 18 | MF | ESP | Roberto Fresnedoso |
| 19 | FW | ESP | Jesús Muñoz |
| 20 | MF | ESP | Juan Carlos |
| 21 | DF | ESP | José Antonio García Calvo |
| 22 | FW | URU | Diego Alonso |
| 23 | DF | ESP | Gonzalo Colsa |
| 25 | GK | ESP | Toni Jiménez |
| 27 | MF | ESP | Juanma Ortiz |

=== Transfers ===
In
| Pos. | Name | from | Type |
|---|---|---|---|
| DF | Txomin Nagore | Numancia | |
| DF | Jorge Otero | Real Betis | |
| MF | José María Movilla | Málaga | |
| GK | Germán Burgos | Mallorca | |
| MF | Jovan Stanković | Marseille | |
| DF | Armando Álvarez | Mallorca | |
| MF | Lluís Carreras | Mallorca | |
| MF | Jesús Muñoz | Albacete | |
| DF | José Antonio García Calvo | Real Valladolid | |
| FW | Diego Alonso | Valencia | |
| MF | Gonzalo Colsa | Racing Santander | |
| MF | Juanma Ortiz | | |

Out
| Pos. | Name | To | Type |
|---|---|---|---|
| FW | Salva | Valencia | |
| MF | Hugo Leal | Paris Saint-Germain | |
| DF | Juanma | | |
| DF | Toni | | |
| DF | Raphaël Wicky | Hamburg SV | |
| MF | Óscar Mena | Racing Santander | |
| FW | Jordi Lardín | Alavés | |
| FW | Abass Lawal | | |
| MF | Sergio Sánchez Sánchez | Sevilla | |
| DF | Zoran Njeguš | Sevilla | |
| DF | Jean-François Hernandez | Rayo Vallecano | |
| FW | Kiko | Extremadura | |
| FW | Juan Gomez | | |
| DF | Daniel Fagiani | | |
| MF | David Cubillo | | |

== Competitions ==
=== Segunda División ===
==== League table ====
| Pos | Team | Pld | W | D | L | GF | GA | GD | Pts | Promotion or relegation |
|---|---|---|---|---|---|---|---|---|---|---|
| 1 | Atlético Madrid (C, P) | 42 | 23 | 10 | 9 | 68 | 44 | +24 | 79 | Promotion to La Liga |
| 2 | Racing Santander (P) | 42 | 19 | 14 | 9 | 58 | 37 | +21 | 71 | Promotion to La Liga |
| 3 | Recreativo (P) | 42 | 18 | 15 | 9 | 47 | 35 | +12 | 69 | Promotion to La Liga |
| 4 | Xerez | 42 | 19 | 9 | 14 | 43 | 42 | +1 | 66 | |
| 5 | Elche | 42 | 17 | 14 | 11 | 52 | 39 | +13 | 65 | |

Source: LFP - Liga Adelante
Rules for classification: 1st points; 2nd head-to-head points; 3rd head-to-head goal difference; 4th head-to-head goals scored; 5th goal difference; 6th number of goals scored; 7th Fair-play points
(C) Champions; (P) Promoted

==== Results by round ====
| Round | 1 | 2 | 3 | 4 | 5 | 6 | 7 | 8 | 9 | 10 | 11 | 12 | 13 | 14 | 15 | 16 | 17 | 18 | 19 | 20 | 21 | 22 | 23 | 24 | 25 | 26 | 27 | 28 | 29 | 30 | 31 | 32 | 33 | 34 | 35 | 36 | 37 | 38 | 39 | 40 | 41 | 42 |
|---|---|---|---|---|---|---|---|---|---|---|---|---|---|---|---|---|---|---|---|---|---|---|---|---|---|---|---|---|---|---|---|---|---|---|---|---|---|---|---|---|---|---|
| Ground | A | H | A | H | A | H | A | H | H | A | H | A | H | A | H | A | H | A | H | A | H | H | A | H | A | H | A | H | A | A | H | A | H | A | H | A | H | A | H | A | H | A |
| Result | W | W | D | W | W | D | D | L | W | W | W | W | W | L | W | W | W | D | L | W | W | L | W | D | L | W | W | W | L | W | D | L | D | L | W | D | W | D | W | W | L | D |
| Position | 2 | 1 | 2 | 1 | 1 | 2 | 2 | 3 | 1 | 1 | 1 | 1 | 1 | 1 | 1 | 1 | 1 | 1 | 1 | 1 | 1 | 1 | 1 | 1 | 1 | 1 | 1 | 1 | 1 | 1 | 1 | 1 | 1 | 1 | 1 | 1 | 1 | 1 | 1 | 1 | 1 | 1 |

Source: Competitive matches
A = Away; H = Home; W = Win; D = Draw; L = Loss; = Leader, Promoted to 2002-03 La Liga; = Promoted to 2002-03 La Liga; = Relegated to Segunda División B

==== Matches ====
| 25 August 2001 1 | Atlético Madrid | 2–0 | Real Jaén | Madrid |
| | Fernando Torres 68'; Dani 87' | Report | | Stadium: Vicente Calderón; Attendance: 32,000; Referee: Juan Sáiz |

| 1 September 2001 2 | Eibar | 0–3 | Atlético Madrid | Eibar |
| | | Report | 34', 42' Alonso; 46' Stanković | Stadium: Municipal; Attendance: 3,500; Referee: Emilio Rubio |

| 8 September 2001 3 | Atlético Madrid | 1–1 | Racing Ferrol | Madrid |
| | Diego Alonso 80' | Report | 41' Ismael | Stadium: Vicente Calderón; Attendance: 40,000; Referee: Luis Martinez |

| 16 September 2001 4 | Leganés | 0–3 | Atlético Madrid | Leganés |
| 12:00 | | Report | 24', 46' Correa; 29' Diego Alonso | Stadium: Butarque; Attendance: 3,000; Referee: Francisco Arcas |

| 22 September 2001 5 | Atlético Madrid | 2–1 | Levante | Madrid |
| | Correa 8'; Garcia Calvo 57' | Report | 40' Josemi | Stadium: Vicente Calderón; Attendance: 40,000; Referee: Miguel Carlos Román |

| 29 September 2001 6 | Salamanca | 0–0 | Atlético Madrid | Villares de la Reina |
| | | Report | | Stadium: El Helmántico; Attendance: 11,000; Referee: Fernando Teixeira |

| 2 October 2001 7 | Atlético Madrid | 1–1 | Recreativo | Madrid |
| | Diego Alonso 67' | Report | 16' R. Molina | Stadium: Vicente Calderón; Attendance: 27,000; Referee: Manuel Pérez |

| 7 October 2001 8 | Sporting Gijón | 2–1 | Atlético Madrid | Gijón |
| 12:00 | Lozano 46' (pen.); Ledjachov 89' (pen.) | Report | 16' Correa | Stadium: El Molinón; Referee: Angel Rodoado |

| 14 October 2001 9 | Atlético Madrid | 1–0 | Badajoz | Madrid |
| | Cidoncha 54' (own goal) | Report | | Stadium: Vicente Calderón; Attendance: 45,000; Referee: David Fernández |

| 21 October 2001 10 | Numancia | 1–2 | Atlético Madrid | Soria |
| | Armada 88' | Report | 30' Alonso; 81' Carlos Aguilera | Stadium: Los Pajaritos; Attendance: 7,000; Referee: Pedro Tristante |

| 27 October 2001 11 | Atlético Madrid | 3–2 | Albacete | Madrid |
| | Carlos Aguilera 8'; Dani 65'; Correa 84' | Report | 38' Toril; 88' Basti | Stadium: Vicente Calderón; Attendance: 45,000; Referee: Miguel Garcia |

| 3 November 2001 12 | Córdoba | 0–2 | Atlético Madrid | Córdoba |
| | | Report | 5' Carlos Aguilera; 56' Diego Alonso | Stadium: Nuevo Arcángel; Attendance: 13,000; Referee: Ricardo Segura |

| 7 November 2001 13 | Atlético Madrid | 4–0 | Elche | Madrid |
| | Fernando Torres 22'; Diego Alonso 45' (pen.); Dani 64'; Correa 89' | Report | | Stadium: Vicente Calderón; Attendance: 40,000; Referee: Carlos Clos |

| 11 November 2001 14 | Real Murcia | 3–1 | Atlético Madrid | Murcia |
| | Loreto 20'; Carrero 36'; Toni 89' (own goal) | Report | 29' Nagore | Stadium: La Condomina; Attendance: 12,000; Referee: José Luis Bello |

| 18 November 2001 15 | Xerez | 0–1 | Atlético Madrid | Jerez de la Frontera |
| | | Report | 17' Carlos Aguilera | Stadium: Chapín; Attendance: 8,000; Referee: Antonio Javega |

| 24 November 2001 16 | Atlético Madrid | 1–0 | Poli Ejido | Madrid |
| | Correa 15' | Report | | Stadium: Vicente Calderón; Attendance: 35,000; Referee: José Luis Bello |

| 2 December 2001 17 | Gimnastic | 1–2 | Atlético Madrid | Tarragona |
| | F. Prieto 81' | Report | 59' Alonso; 76' Fernando Torres | Stadium: Nou Estadi; Attendance: 12,000; Referee: José Luis Paradas |

| 9 December 2001 18 | Atlético Madrid | 0–0 | Real Oviedo | Madrid |
| | | Report | | Stadium: Vicente Calderón; Attendance: 54,000; Referee: Pedro Tristante |

| 16 December 2001 19 | Extremadura | 2–0 | Atlético Madrid | Almendralejo |
| | Santi 45' (own goal); Moreno 63' | Report | | Stadium: Francisco de la Hera; Attendance: 12,000; Referee: David Fernández |

| 22 December 2001 20 | Atlético Madrid | 2–0 | Racing Santander | Madrid |
| | Fernando Torres 63'; Luque 89' | Report | | Stadium: Vicente Calderón; Attendance: 40,000; Referee: Miguel Ayza |

| 6 January 2002 21 | Burgos | 0–4 | Atlético Madrid | Burgos |
| | | Report | 39' Carreras; 47' Hibić; 78', 82' Dani | Stadium: El Plantío; Attendance: 9,000; Referee: Luis Martínez |

| 13 January 2002 22 | Real Jaén | 1–0 | Atlético Madrid | Jaén |
| | Sierra 12' | Report | | Stadium: La Victoria; Attendance: 11,000; Referee: Fidel Valle |

| 19 January 2002 23 | Atlético Madrid | 1–0 | Eibar | Madrid |
| | Alonso 51' (pen.) | Report | | Stadium: Vicente Calderón; Attendance: 40,000; Referee: Amador García |

| 26 January 2002 24 | Racing Ferrol | 1–1 | Atlético Madrid | Ferrol |
| | Ismael 44' | Report | 20' Alonso | Stadium: A Malata; Attendance: 9,000; Referee: José Luis Paradas |

| 2 February 2002 25 | Atlético Madrid | 0–2 | Leganés | Madrid |
| | | Report | 62' Óscar; 74' Villa | Stadium: Vicente Calderón; Attendance: 40,000; Referee: Emilio Rubio |

| 7 February 2002 26 | Levante | 2–4 | Atlético Madrid | Valencia |
| | Lima 31' (pen.); Kaiku 64' | Report | 40', 90' Fernando Torres; 61' Correa; 87' Alonso | Stadium: Ciutat de Valencia; Attendance: 10,000; Referee: Eduardo Pérez |

| 10 February 2002 27 | Atlético Madrid | 2–1 | Salamanca | Madrid |
| | Nagore 39'; Carlos Aguilera 90' | Report | 60' Makukula | Stadium: Vicente Calderón; Attendance: 40,000; Referee: David Jiménez |

| 16 February 2002 28 | Recreativo | 1–3 | Atlético Madrid | Huelva |
| | Antoñito 50' | Report | 15' Hibić; 28' Movilla; 92' Alonso | Stadium: Nuevo Colombino; Attendance: 18,000; Referee: José Luis Bello |

| 24 February 2002 29 | Atlético Madrid | 0–1 | Sporting Gijón | Madrid |
| | | Report | 87' Pirri | Stadium: Vicente Calderón; Attendance: 54,900; Referee: José Luis Rebollo |

| 3 March 2002 30 | Badajoz | 0–1 | Atlético Madrid | Badajoz |
| | | Report | 17' Santi | Stadium: Nuevo Vivero; Attendance: 18,000; Referee: Fernando Román |

| 9 March 2002 31 | Atlético Madrid | 2–2 | Numancia | Madrid |
| | Aguilera 15'; Nagore 47' | Report | 87' Parri; 90' Marini | Stadium: Vicente Calderón; Attendance: 50,000; Referee: Carlos Clos |

| 16 March 2002 32 | Albacete | 2–1 | Atlético Madrid | Albacete |
| | Juanlu 39'; Basti 44' | Report | 45' Carlos Aguilera | Stadium: Carlos Belmonte; Attendance: 9,000; Referee: Antonio Jávega |

| 23 March 2002 33 | Atlético Madrid | 0–0 | Córdoba | Madrid |
| | | Report | | Stadium: Vicente Calderón; Attendance: 45,000; Referee: Manuel Valle |

| 30 March 2002 34 | Elche | 5–1 | Atlético Madrid | Elche |
| | Serrano 20'; Nino 27', 67'; Ivars 75'; Israel 89' | Report | 82' Dani | Stadium: Manuel Martínez Valero; Attendance: 22,000; Referee: Fernando Teixeira Vitienes |

| 6 April 2002 35 | Atlético Madrid | 4–2 | Real Murcia | Madrid |
| | Alonso 31' (pen.), 43', 92'; Carlos Aguilera 59' | Report | 45' (pen.) Cuadrado; 94' Loreto | Stadium: Vicente Calderón; Attendance: 35,000; Referee: Vicente Lizondo |

| 14 April 2002 36 | Atlético Madrid | 0–0 | Xerez | Madrid |
| | | Report | | Stadium: Vicente Calderón; Attendance: 55,000; Referee: Ricardo Segura |

| 20 April 2002 37 | Poli Ejido | 1–2 | Atlético Madrid | El Ejido |
| | Bordi 82' | Report | 20' (pen.) Alonso; 85' Correa | Stadium: Santo Domingo; Attendance: 5,500; Referee: Miguel Ángel Ayza |

| 27 April 2002 38 | Atlético Madrid | 3–3 | Gimnastic | Madrid |
| | Alonso 17', 70'; Correa 81' | Report | 10' A. Tomás; 74', 90' Cuéllar | Stadium: Vicente Calderón; Attendance: 58,000; Referee: José Luis Bello |

| 5 May 2002 39 | Real Oviedo | 2–3 | Atlético Madrid | Oviedo |
| 12:00 | Tomic 27'; Geni 90' (rig) | Report | 7', 89' Correa; 86' Carreras | Stadium: Carlos Tartiere; Attendance: 12,849; Referee: Pedro Tristante Oliva |

| 11 May 2002 40 | Atlético Madrid | 3–2 | Extremadura | Madrid |
| | Alonso 21', 69'; Correa 36' | Report | 30' Jesús; 55' (pen.) Poli | Stadium: Vicente Calderón; Attendance: 35,000; Referee: Emilio Rubio |

| 19 May 2002 41 | Racing Santander | 1–0 | Atlético Madrid | Santander |
| | Mora 74' | Report | | Stadium: El Sardinero; Attendance: 21,801; Referee: Luis Miguel Martinez |

| 25 May 2002 42 | Atlético Madrid | 1–1 | Burgos | Madrid |
| | Alonso 18' | Report | 41' Merino | Stadium: Vicente Calderón; Attendance: 40,000; Referee: Antonio Jávega |

=== Copa del Rey ===
==== Round of 64 ====
| 10 October 2001 | Atlético Madrid | 1–3 | Rayo Vallecano | Madrid |
| | Fernando Torres 11' (pen.) | Report | 23' (pen.) Pablo Sanz; 33' Bolo; 64' Bolo | Stadium: Vicente Calderón; Referee: Lopez Nieto |

== Statistics ==
=== Players statistics ===
| No. | Pos | Nat | Player | Total | | Segunda División | | Copa del Rey | |
| No. | Pos | Nat | Player | Apps | Goals | Apps | Goals | Apps | Goals |
|---|---|---|---|---|---|---|---|---|---|
| 13 | GK | (Argentina) ARG | Burgos | 35 | -34 | 35 | -34 | | |
| 15 | DF | (Spain) ESP | Carlos Aguilera | 40 | 8 | 37+2 | 8 | 1 | 0 |
| 21 | DF | (Spain) ESP | Garcia Calvo | 36 | 1 | 35 | 1 | 1 | 0 |
| 4 | DF | (Bosnia and Herzegovina) BIH | Hibic | 33 | 2 | 32 | 2 | 1 | 0 |
| 17 | DF | (Spain) ESP | Carreras | 28 | 2 | 27+1 | 2 | | |
| 12 | MF | (Spain) ESP | Armando | 34 | 0 | 32+2 | 0 | | |
| 7 | MF | (Spain) ESP | Movilla | 38 | 1 | 38 | 1 | | |
| 2 | MF | (Spain) ESP | Nagore | 41 | 3 | 36+4 | 3 | 1 | 0 |
| 11 | MF | (Federal Republic of Yugoslavia) YUG | Stankovic | 35 | 1 | 28+6 | 1 | 0+1 | 0 |
| 22 | FW | (Uruguay) URU | Diego Alonso | 39 | 22 | 32+6 | 22 | 1 | 0 |
| 9 | FW | (Spain) ESP | Fernando Torres | 37 | 7 | 26+10 | 6 | 1 | 1 |
| 25 | GK | (Spain) ESP | Toni | 6 | -6 | 5+1 | -6 | | |
| 10 | FW | (Uruguay) URU | Correa | 34 | 13 | 21+13 | 13 | | |
| 14 | MF | (Portugal) POR | Dani | 37 | 6 | 17+20 | 6 | | |
| 6 | DF | (Spain) ESP | Santi | 15 | 1 | 15 | 1 | | |
| 29 | DF | (Spain) ESP | Antonio Lopez | 21 | 0 | 13+7 | 0 | 1 | 0 |
| 3 | DF | (Spain) ESP | Otero | 17 | 0 | 10+6 | 0 | 1 | 0 |
| 23 | DF | (Spain) ESP | Colsa | 19 | 0 | 8+10 | 0 | 1 | 0 |
| 16 | MF | (Spain) ESP | Luque | 20 | 1 | 6+13 | 1 | 1 | 0 |
| 1 | GK | (Spain) ESP | Sergio | 4 | -7 | 2+1 | -4 | 1 | -3 |
| 5 | DF | (Spain) ESP | Amaya | 4 | 0 | 3 | 0 | 0+1 | 0 |
| 18 | MF | (Spain) ESP | Roberto | 13 | 0 | 1+12 | 0 | | |
| 19 | FW | (Spain) ESP | Jesus Muñoz | 13 | 0 | 3+9 | 0 | 0+1 | 0 |
| 31 | FW | (Spain) ESP | Loren | 1 | 0 | 1 | 0 | | |
| 27 | MF | (Spain) ESP | Juanma Ortiz | 1 | 0 | 1 | 0 | | |
| 20 | MF | (Spain) ESP | Carcedo | 0 | 0 | 0 | 0 | | |

=== Squad statistics ===
| Competition | Points | Total | | | | | | GD |
| Competition | Points | G | W | D | L | GS | GR | GD |
|---|---|---|---|---|---|---|---|---|
| 2001–02 Segunda División | 74 | 42 | 21 | 11 | 10 | 59 | 39 | +20 |
| 2001–02 Copa del Rey | – | 8 | 6 | 1 | 1 | 13 | 6 | +7 |
| Total | 74 | 50 | 27 | 12 | 11 | 72 | 45 | +27 |
