= Javi Guerrero =

Spanish footballer (born 1976)

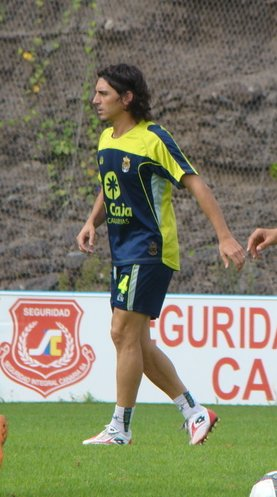
- Guerrero training with Las Palmas in 2009

Personal information
- Full name: Francisco Javier García Guerrero
- Date of birth: 22 October 1976 (age 50)
- Place of birth: Madrid, Spain
- Height: 1.78 m (5 ft 10 in)
- Position: Striker

Youth career
- Real Madrid

Senior career*
| Years | Team | Apps | (Gls) |
| 1995–1996 | Real Madrid C | 29 | (21) |
| 1996–1999 | Real Madrid B | 52 | (12) |
| 1997 | → Jaén (loan) | 6 | (0) |
| 1998 | → Terrassa (loan) | 6 | (2) |
| 1999–2001 | Albacete | 67 | (20) |
| 2001 | Atlético Madrid | 0 | (0) |
| 2001–2005 | Racing Santander | 133 | (44) |
| 2005–2007 | Celta | 20 | (0) |
| 2006–2007 | → Recreativo (loan) | 23 | (7) |
| 2007–2009 | Recreativo | 49 | (7) |
| 2009–2013 | Las Palmas | 123 | (36) |
| Total | | 508 | (149) |
- * Club domestic league appearances and goals

Francisco Javier 'Javi' García Guerrero (born 22 October 1976) is a Spanish former professional footballer who played as a striker.

He amassed La Liga totals of 195 games and 48 goals over seven seasons, mainly in representation of Racing de Santander and Recreativo (three years apiece). He added 251 matches and 72 goals in the Segunda División, in a senior career that lasted 18 years.

== Playing career ==
Guerrero was born in Madrid. An unsuccessful youth graduate at Real Madrid, he also had loan stints with Real Jaén and Terrassa FC – respectively in the second and third divisions – before being released in the summer of 1999, after which he signed with Albacete Balompié in the former tier, going on to score 20 league goals over two seasons.

Ahead of the 2001–02 campaign, Guerrero joined Atlético Madrid alongside teammate Jesús Muñoz, but he was quickly deemed surplus to requirements by manager Luis Aragonés, moving to Racing de Santander in late August without ever playing a competitive match. He was always first choice during his spell with the Cantabria club, netting an average of 11 goals per season.

Guerrero joined RC Celta de Vigo for 2005–06, although he would appear sparingly as the Galician team qualified for the UEFA Cup. He joined Recreativo de Huelva in September 2006 (initially on loan), agreeing to a permanent contract ahead of the 2007–08 season. On 18 May 2008, his last-minute goal in a 1–1 home game against Real Valladolid helped the Andalusians to retain their top-flight status.

After a weak 2008–09 campaign (only two goals, team relegation), the 32-year-old Guerrero returned to division two, signing a two-year deal with UD Las Palmas and being the Canary Islands side's top scorer in his first two seasons at 11 and 12 respectively. In spite of still having one year left in his contract, he retired at the end of 2012–13 with Las Palmas still in the second division, aged nearly 37.

== Post-retirement ==
Guerrero remained attached to his last club, as a match scout. In October 2017, he accepted an offer from Sevilla FC to act as a link between the board of directors and the first team.
