= Gonzalo Colsa =

Spanish footballer (born 1979)

Personal information
- Full name: Gonzalo Colsa Albendea
- Date of birth: 2 April 1979 (age 47)
- Place of birth: Santander, Spain
- Height: 1.85 m (6 ft 1 in)
- Position: Midfielder

Youth career
- Racing Santander

Senior career*
Years	Team	Apps	(Gls)
1996–1998	Racing B	28	(6)
1998–2001	Racing Santander	39	(3)
1999	→ Logroñés (loan)	5	(0)
2001–2006	Atlético Madrid	62	(4)
2002–2003	→ Valladolid (loan)	37	(5)
2003–2004	→ Mallorca (loan)	32	(3)
2006–2012	Racing Santander	188	(14)
2012–2013	Mirandés	3	(0)
Total		394	(35)

International career
1995	Spain U16	5	(1)
1995	Spain U17	3	(0)
1996–1998	Spain U18	21	(0)
1998–1999	Spain U20	10	(3)
1999–2001	Spain U21	12	(4)

Managerial career
- 2015–2016: Racing Santander (assistant)
- 2016–2017: Ponferradina (assistant)
Medal record
Representing Spain
Men's football
FIFA World Youth Championship
Winner	1999 Nigeria
- * Club domestic league appearances and goals

Gonzalo Colsa Albendea (born 2 April 1979) is a Spanish former professional footballer who played mainly as a central midfielder.

He amassed La Liga totals of 340 matches and 29 goals over 14 seasons, representing in the competition Racing de Santander (two spells), Atlético Madrid, Valladolid and Mallorca.

== Club career ==
A product of Racing de Santander's youth academy, Colsa was born in Santander, and he appeared sporadically with the first team (with an unassuming Segunda División stint with CD Logroñés in between) during his first four seasons, although he scored three goals in 19 games in 2000–01 as the Cantabrians were relegated from La Liga.

After representing Atlético Madrid, Real Valladolid and RCD Mallorca, Colsa returned to Santander for the 2006–07 campaign, as an undisputed starter and one of the team's captains. In the second season in his second spell he played all the matches as Racing achieved a first-ever qualification for the UEFA Cup, and netted two times.

Colsa retired in June 2013 at the age of 34, having featured rarely for second-tier side CD Mirandés. Starting in March 2015, he went on to work as an assistant coach under former Racing teammate Pedro Munitis, at that club and SD Ponferradina.

== International career ==
Colsa was part of the Spain squad that won the 1999 FIFA World Youth Championship in Nigeria, contributing four appearances to the feat. He made his debut for the under-21s on 9 October of that year, in a 2–1 home win against Israel for the 2000 UEFA European Championship qualifiers.

== Career statistics ==
Club performance			League		Cup		Continental		Other		Total	
Club	Season	League	Apps	Goals	Apps	Goals	Apps	Goals	Apps	Goals	Apps	Goals
Spain			League		Copa del Rey		Europe		Other		Total	
Racing B	1997–98	Segunda División B	28	6	—		—		—		28	6
Racing Santander	1997–98	La Liga	1	0	1	0	—		—		2	0
Racing Santander	1998–99	La Liga	1	0	2	0	—		—		3	0
Racing Santander	1999–00	La Liga	18	0	3	0	—		—		21	0
Racing Santander	2000–01	La Liga	19	3	6	0	—		—		25	3
Racing Santander	Subtotal		39	3	12	0	—		—		51	3
Logroñés (loan)	1998–99	Segunda División	5	0	—		—		—		5	0
Atlético Madrid	2001–02	Segunda División	18	0	1	0	—		—		19	0
Atlético Madrid	2004–05	La Liga	30	3	8	0	4 (Note: Appearances in UEFA Intertoto Cup)	0	—		42	3
Atlético Madrid	2005–06	La Liga	14	1	1	0	—		—		15	1
Atlético Madrid	Subtotal		62	4	10	0	4	0	—		76	4
Valladolid (loan)	2002–03	La Liga	37	5	4	1	—		—		41	6
Mallorca (loan)	2003–04	La Liga	32	3	2	0	5 (Note: Appearances in UEFA Cup)	0	—		39	3
Racing Santander	2006–07	La Liga	37	4	1	0	—		—		37	4
Racing Santander	2007–08	La Liga	38	2	8	0	—		—		38	2
Racing Santander	2008–09	La Liga	34	2	4	1	5	1	—		34	2
Racing Santander	2009–10	La Liga	30	3	7	1	—		—		30	3
Racing Santander	2010–11	La Liga	31	2	2	0	—		—		31	2
Racing Santander	2011–12	La Liga	18	1	1	0	—		—		19	1
Racing Santander	Subtotal		188	13	12	0	5	1	—		205	14
Mirandés	2012–13	Segunda División	3	0	2	0	—		—		5	0
Career total			394	35	53	3	14	1	0	0	408	36

== Honours ==
Atlético Madrid

- Segunda División: 2001–02

Spain U20

- FIFA World Youth Championship: 1999
