= Pedro Munitis =

Spanish footballer and manager (born 1975)

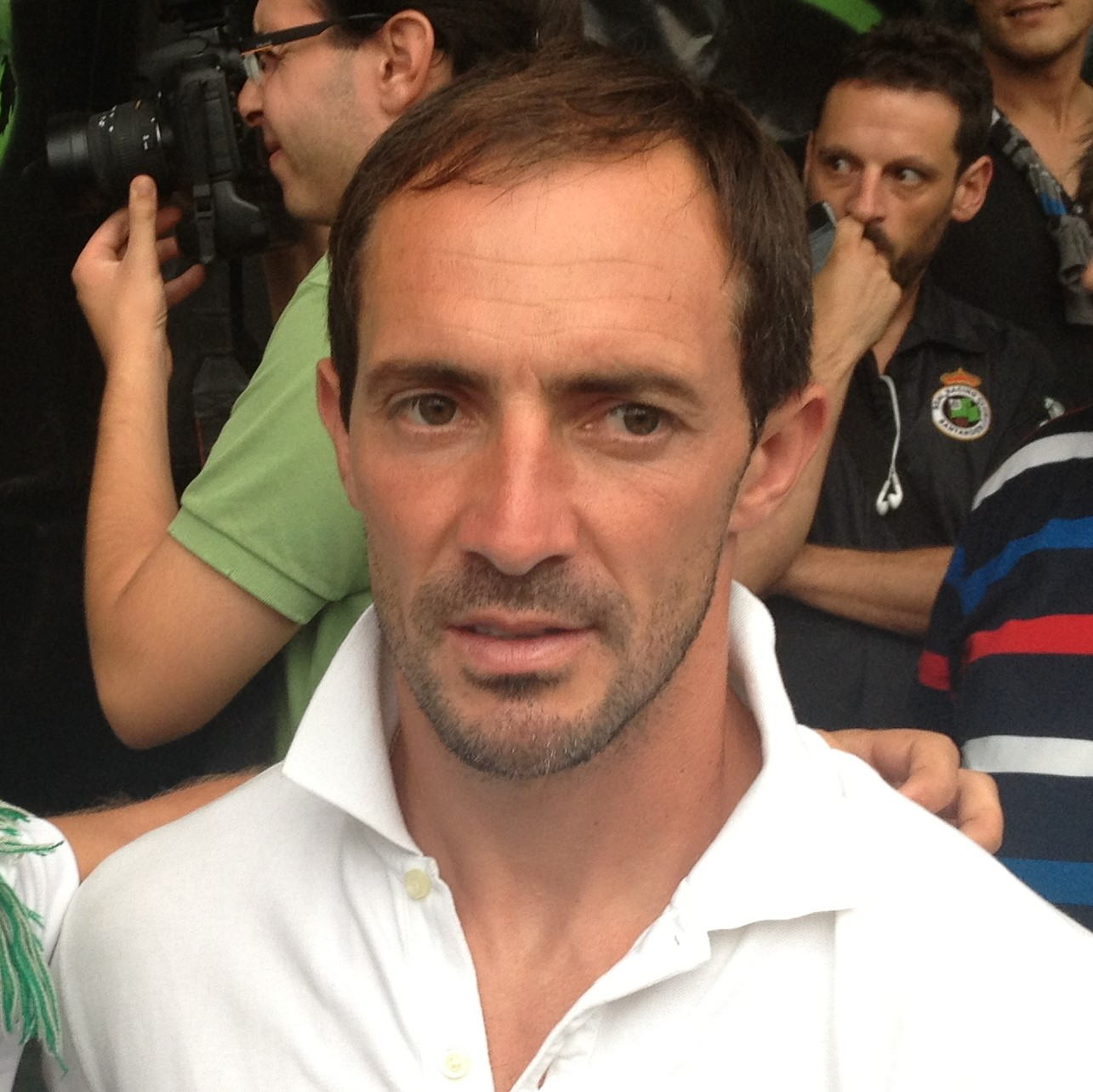
- Munitis in 2013

Personal information
- Full name: Pedro Munitis Álvarez
- Date of birth: 19 June 1975 (age 51)
- Place of birth: Santander, Spain
- Height: 1.67 m (5 ft 6 in)
- Position: Forward

Youth career
- Santoña

Senior career*
Years	Team	Apps	(Gls)
1992–1993	Santoña		
1993–1997	Racing B		
1995–2000	Racing Santander	83	(14)
1997–1998	→ Badajoz (loan)	28	(10)
2000–2003	Real Madrid	53	(4)
2002–2003	→ Racing Santander (loan)	30	(8)
2003–2006	Deportivo La Coruña	90	(5)
2006–2012	Racing Santander	191	(12)
Total		475	(53)

International career
1999–2002	Spain	21	(2)

Managerial career
- 2012–2014: Reocín Women
- 2014–2015: Bansander (youth)
- 2015: Racing Santander (assistant)
- 2015–2016: Racing Santander
- 2016–2017: Ponferradina
- 2018–2019: UCAM Murcia
- 2020: Badajoz
- 2021–2022: Sabadell
- 2023: Lugo
- * Club domestic league appearances and goals

Pedro Munitis Álvarez (born 19 June 1975) is a Spanish former professional footballer who played mainly as a forward, currently a manager.

His 20-year senior career was mainly associated with Racing de Santander – he also represented Real Madrid for two years – and he played 447 La Liga matches over 17 seasons, scoring 43 goals.

A Spain international in the late 1990s/early 2000s, Munitis represented the country at Euro 2000.

== Club career ==
Born in Santander, Cantabria, Munitis played in three separate periods for hometown Racing de Santander. He first appeared with its first team on 22 January 1995, in a 0–0 home draw against Real Sociedad.

After a loan to Badajoz (Segunda División) and scoring 14 goals in 72 league games with Racing from 1998 to 2000, Munitis attracted attention from La Liga giants Real Madrid, who signed him for £6.8 million. He was relatively used in his two-year spell at the capital club, helping it to one league and the 2001–02 UEFA Champions League.

Munitis spent the 2002–03 season on loan at Racing Santander, notably netting (and celebrating) against Real Madrid in a 2–0 home win on 19 October 2002. In the following off-season, he was purchased up by Deportivo de La Coruña on a free transfer; after a poor first year he would be one of the Galicia side's most important attacking players, also being used as a left winger in order to provide rest for veteran captain Fran and being his replacement when he retired at the end of 2004–05.

Munitis returned to Racing in July 2006, forming an interesting attacking partnership with gigantic Serbian Nikola Žigić in his debut campaign and helping it achieve a first ever qualification for the UEFA Cup in his second. On 19 April 2009, he played his 200th league match for the club, at Espanyol.

In 2009–10, the 34-year-old Munitis was again an undisputed starter, but did not manage to find the net in 29 appearances, and his season was over during a 3–1 home victory over Espanyol due to a knee injury, on 14 April 2010; at that time he ranked second in assists, only trailing Barcelona's Lionel Messi.

On 17 October 2010, after more than one year without scoring, Munitis netted from 30 metres for the only goal of the home fixture against Almería. During the season, he again featured prominently in the starting XI under both Miguel Ángel Portugal and his successor Marcelino García Toral, the latter returned to the Campos de Sport de El Sardinero after nearly three years. In the following campaign he failed to score in 32 matches, and Racing returned to the second tier after one decade, with the player announcing shortly after his decision to leave his main club.

== International career ==
Munitis earned 21 caps for Spain, scoring two goals. He represented the nation at UEFA Euro 2000, appearing as a substitute and netting in a 4–3 group stage win over Yugoslavia and starting in the quarter-final loss to France (2–1).

Munitis' debut came on 27 March 1999 in a Euro 2000 qualifier against Austria, playing 30 minutes in a 9–0 thrashing in Valencia.

=== International goals ===
#	Date	Venue	Opponent	Score	Result	Competition
1.	18 August 1999	Polish Army, Warsaw, Poland	Poland	1–2	1–2	Friendly
2.	21 June 2000	Jan Breydel, Bruges, Belgium	FR Yugoslavia	2–2	3–4	Euro 2000

== Style of play ==
Described as a "poacher" in the media, Munitis was capable of playing either as a forward or midfielder but was usually deployed as a left winger, and was one of the shortest players in the Spanish top flight throughout his career. He was best known for his speed, dribbling skills, creative ability, direct movement and fighting spirit, which made him an effective offensive threat inside the penalty box and difficult for opposing defenders to mark, with Frenchman Lilian Thuram labelling him as one of his most difficult opponents.

== Coaching career ==
Still not having announced his retirement, Munitis began his managerial career, with women's football club Reocín. In 2014 he was appointed at Bansander, taking charge of the youth squads.

Munitis returned to Racing on 3 March 2015, being appointed assistant manager along with former teammate Gonzalo Colsa. After their relegation, he took the reins of the team in Segunda División B and won the group, but left in June 2016 following elimination by Cádiz in the playoffs.

On 17 October 2016, Munitis succeeded Manolo Herrero as manager of newly relegated Ponferradina, with Colsa as his assistant. He resigned five months later with the team lying in sixth in division three, having won exactly a third of his games.

Munitis returned to third-tier management on 26 March 2018, when he was hired by UCAM Murcia until the end of the season. Despite missing his objective of a play-off place, he was given another year in the job. He was dismissed on 29 April 2019 with the team still in contention for the play-offs with three rounds to go, and replaced by Juan Merino.

On 4 February 2020, Munitis succeeded Mehdi Nafti at Badajoz, where he had played over two decades ago. After the season was truncated by the COVID-19 pandemic, the team lost in the playoff semi-finals on penalties to Barcelona B. He left on his own terms in October, shortly before the start of the new campaign.

Munitis was appointed at Sabadell of the Primera División RFEF on 23 November 2021, until the end of the season and with the option of another year. He took the team out of the relegation zone and challenged for the play-offs until the penultimate round of fixtures; in June, he left after turning down a contract renewal.

On 21 June 2023, Munitis was named in charge of Lugo, recently relegated to the third division. On 16 December, he was sacked.

== Managerial statistics ==
As of 16 December 2023

Managerial record by team and tenure
Team	From	To	Record								Ref
Team	From	To	G	W	D	L	GF	GA	GD	Win %	Ref
Racing Santander	30 June 2015	12 June 2016	43	21	11	11	56	36	+20	48.84	
Ponferradina	17 October 2016	19 March 2017	27	10	11	6	27	21	+6	37.04	
UCAM Murcia	26 March 2018	28 April 2019	44	20	9	15	59	48	+11	45.45	
Badajoz	4 February 2020	10 October 2020	7	3	2	2	10	7	+3	42.86	
Sabadell	24 November 2021	25 June 2022	26	14	5	7	36	19	+17	53.85	
Lugo	21 June 2023	16 December 2023	19	9	5	5	18	16	+2	47.37	
Total			166	77	43	46	206	147	+59	46.39	—

== Honours ==
Real Madrid

- La Liga: 2000–01
- UEFA Champions League: 2001–02

== See also ==
- List of La Liga players (400+ appearances)
