= Germán Burgos =

Argentine footballer and manager

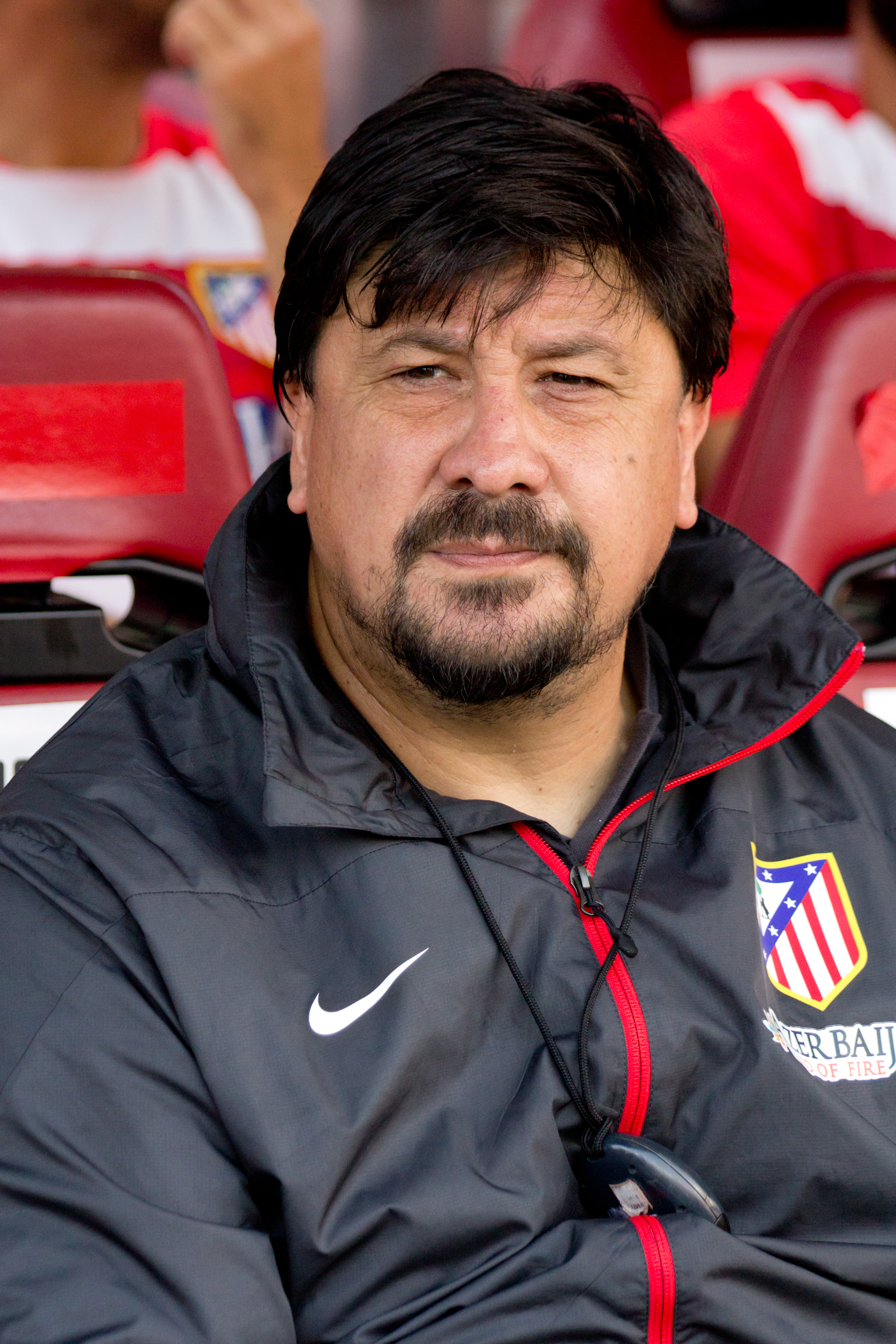
- Burgos with Atlético Madrid in 2013

Personal information
- Full name: Germán Adrián Ramón Burgos
- Date of birth: 16 April 1969 (age 57)
- Place of birth: Mar del Plata, Argentina
- Height: 1.89 m (6 ft 2 in)
- Position: Goalkeeper

Youth career
- Almagro de Florida
- 1985–1989: Ferro Carril Oeste

Senior career*
Years	Team	Apps	(Gls)
1989–1994	Ferro Carril Oeste	104	(0)
1994–1999	River Plate	94	(0)
1999–2001	Mallorca	12	(0)
2001–2004	Atlético Madrid	63	(0)
Total		273	(0)

International career
1995–2002	Argentina	35	(0)

Managerial career
- 2010: Carabanchel
- 2011: Catania (assistant)
- 2011: Racing Club (assistant)
- 2011–2020: Atlético Madrid (assistant)
- 2018: Atlético Madrid (caretaker)
- 2021: Newell's Old Boys
- 2022: Aris
- * Club domestic league appearances and goals

Germán Adrián Ramón Burgos (Spanish pronunciation: [xeɾˈmam ˈbuɾɣos]; born 16 April 1969), nicknamed El Mono Burgos ([el ˈmono ˈβuɾɣos]), is an Argentine retired professional footballer who played as a goalkeeper, currently a manager.

During his 15-year senior career, he played for Ferro Carril Oeste, River Plate, Mallorca and Atlético Madrid, the latter two clubs in Spain. He was an Argentine international from the mid-1990s to the early 2000s.

After retiring, Burgos worked as assistant coach at several teams under his compatriot Diego Simeone, most notably Atlético Madrid whom they joined in 2011.

== Playing career ==
=== Club ===
Born in Mar del Plata, Buenos Aires Province, Burgos started playing professionally with Ferro Carril Oeste. In 1994, he signed with Argentine Primera División giants River Plate where he was dubbed Mono (monkey) because of his height and disheveled appearance, going on to win several titles during his spell, notably the 1994 Apertura where his team did not lose one single match.

Burgos moved abroad in July 1999, joining Spain's Mallorca. During his two-year spell in the Balearic Islands, he played understudy to compatriot Leo Franco. On 27 November 1999, he was suspended for eleven games for punching Espanyol player Manolo Serrano in a match played the previous week, in an action that eluded the referee but was caught on camera.

In the 2001–02 season, Burgos signed with Atlético Madrid, with the capital club in the Segunda División. He had his best year in the country in an eventual return to La Liga after a two-year absence, but appeared less in the following two campaigns, retiring at the end of 2003–04 aged 35.

Burgos was remembered for his performance in a Madrid derby against Real Madrid in the first season back in the top flight of the Colchoneros, in which he saved Luís Figo's penalty kick with his nose, causing a bloody injury; he played on, and his side eventually scored an equaliser to earn a 2–2 draw.

=== International ===
Burgos earned 35 caps for Argentina over seven years. He was second choice at both the 1998 and 2002 FIFA World Cups, backing up Carlos Roa in the former tournament and Pablo Cavallero four years later.

Burgos was the starter in the latter half of the qualifying campaign for the 2002 World Cup (unseating Roberto Bonano) and it was generally expected that he would be the first choice in the finals, but manager Marcelo Bielsa ultimately chose Cavallero.

== Coaching career ==
In 2010, after working with Alcorcón as a goalkeeping coach, Burgos started his managerial career also in Spain, with amateurs Carabanchel. In the following years, he worked as assistant to former club and country teammate Diego Simeone at Catania, Racing Club de Avellaneda and Atlético Madrid.

Burgos became the first coach in the world to use Google Glass during a competitive game, in April 2014 against Getafe. After Simeone was sent to the stands by the referee in the first leg of the 2017–18 UEFA Europa League semi-finals against Arsenal, and was therefore suspended for the second leg and the final after Atlético advanced, he took charge of the team as they defeated Marseille.

With Simeone still suspended, Burgos took over again when Atlético faced Real Madrid in the 2018 UEFA Super Cup, won 4–2 in Estonia. Unable to reach an agreement with the board, he announced his intention to leave at the end of the 2019–20 season.

Burgos was handed his first job as a head coach at the professional level on 14 March 2021, when he signed a contract until the end of the year at Newell's Old Boys with the option to renew it for a further season. He joined midway through the Copa de la Liga Profesional, and his side earned ten points from their remaining eight games, finishing bottom of Zone B. In addition to that, they failed to advance from their group in the Copa Sudamericana, and after the conclusion of both tournaments he left by mutual consent.

On 22 February 2022, Burgos replaced Akis Mantzios at the helm of Aris in the Super League Greece.

== Personal life ==
Outside football, Burgos was also a musician, having started his career while still an active player. He acted as the frontman of rock band The Garb.

Burgos was successfully treated for cancer in 2003.

== Controversies ==
On 11 April 2024, Burgos was let go from his position as a sports commentator for Spanish TV broadcaster Movistar Plus+ for controversial remarks about Barcelona player Lamine Yamal. As the latter was seen juggling with a ball, the former reportedly stated that if Yamal's football career did not go well, "he could end up at a traffic light." Burgos later apologised for his comment, one that contributed to fuel the debate surrounding racism in Spanish football.

== Managerial statistics ==
As of match played 28 August 2022

Managerial record by team and tenure
Team	Nat	From	To	Record							
Team	Nat	From	To	G	W	D	L	GF	GA	GD	Win %
Atlético Madrid (caretaker)	(Spain)	3 May 2018	15 August 2018	3	3	0	0	8	2	+6	100.00
Newell's Old Boys	(Argentina)	14 March 2021	8 June 2021	15	4	6	5	17	18	−1	26.67
Aris	(Greece)	17 February 2022	29 August 2022	19	12	2	5	31	16	+15	63.16
Total				37	19	8	10	56	36	+20	51.35

== Honours ==
River Plate

- Argentine Primera División: Apertura 1994, 1996, 1997, 1999; Clausura 1997
- Copa Libertadores: 1996
- Supercopa Sudamericana: 1997

Atlético Madrid

- Segunda División: 2001–02
