= Daniel Alonso =

Uruguayan footballer (born 1956)

Personal information
- Full name: Daniel Ricardo Alonso Danese
- Date of birth: 18 April 1956 (age 70)
- Place of birth: Montevideo, Uruguay

Senior career*
Years	Team	Apps	(Gls)
1973–1975	Wanderers	?	(?)
1975–1977	Sevilla	12	(0)
1977–1978	Castellón	17	(1)
1978–1979	Veracruz	?	(?)
1979–1980	Liverpool	?	(?)
1980	Universidad Católica	5	(1)
Total		29	(1)

International career
1979	Uruguay	4	(0)
- * Club domestic league appearances and goals

Daniel Ricardo Alonso Danese (born 18 April 1956) is a Uruguayan footballer. He played in four matches for the Uruguay national football team in 1979. He was also part of Uruguay's squad for the 1979 Copa América tournament.

== Personal life ==
His two sons, Iván and Matías, were also footballers. Both began their careers at River Plate. His nephew is Diego Alonso, who also was in Sevilla, but only as a head coach, was appointed on 10 October 2023.
