= Carlos Aguilera (Spanish footballer) =

Spanish footballer (born 1969)

Personal information
- Full name: Carlos Aguilera Martín
- Date of birth: 22 May 1969 (age 57)
- Place of birth: Madrid, Spain
- Height: 1.74 m (5 ft 9 in)
- Position: Right-back

Youth career
- San Cristóbal
- Atlético Madrid

Senior career*
Years	Team	Apps	(Gls)
1987–1988	Atlético Madrid B	29	(11)
1988–1993	Atlético Madrid	96	(7)
1993–1996	Tenerife	88	(6)
1996–2005	Atlético Madrid	269	(22)
Total		482	(46)

International career
1989–1990	Spain U21	5	(0)
1997–1998	Spain	7	(0)
- * Club domestic league appearances and goals

Carlos Aguilera Martín (born 22 May 1969) is a Spanish former professional footballer.

Having started his career as a right winger, he finished it at his first club Atlético Madrid as a right-back. In a career that spanned almost two decades, he appeared in 375 La Liga games and scored 21 goals.

Aguilera represented Spain at the 1998 World Cup.

== Club career ==
Born in Madrid, Aguilera began his career at Atlético Madrid, and his debut for the first team came on 26 March 1988 against Sporting de Gijón, after having started the season at the reserve side. He played for the club until 1993, winning consecutive Copa del Rey trophies (1991 and 1992) in the process.

Aguilera then signed with CD Tenerife, staying three years at the Estadio Heliodoro Rodríguez López. Incidentally, his best season in La Liga, 1995–96 – with five goals in 39 matches as the islanders qualified for the UEFA Cup– came as Atlético reached an historical double; previously, on 8 December 1993, he had scored his first UEFA Cup goal in the 2–1 home win for Tenerife against Juventus FC in the third round, lost 4–2 on aggregate.

In summer 1996, Aguilera returned to his first team, remaining with them even after a 2000 relegation and again putting up strong numbers over two Segunda División campaigns, featuring in 78 games and scoring 14 goals. Ahead of 2003–04, while agreeing to a new 12-month contract, he even accepted to take a pay cut.

Aguilera retired in 2005, aged 36. He returned to Atlético in directorial capacities six years later; in October 2017, he was told his services as youth system coordinator were no longer required.

== International career ==
Aguilera's form during his return to Atlético led to a selection for the Spain national team, his debut coming on 24 September 1997 in a 2–1 away victory over Slovakia in the 1998 FIFA World Cup qualifiers. He was included in the squad for the final stages in France, starting against Paraguay (0–0) and Bulgaria (6–1 win) in a group-stage elimination.

Aguilera totalled seven caps in one year.

== Honours ==
Atlético Madrid

- Copa del Rey: 1990–91, 1991–92; runner-up: 1998–99, 1999–2000
- Segunda División: 2001–02
