= José Mari (footballer, born 1978) =

Spanish footballer

Personal information
- Full name: José Maria Romero Poyón
- Date of birth: 10 December 1978 (age 47)
- Place of birth: Seville, Spain
- Height: 1.84 m (6 ft 0 in)
- Position: Forward

Youth career
- 1994–1995: Lledón
- 1995–1996: Sevilla

Senior career*
Years	Team	Apps	(Gls)
1996–1997	Sevilla B	25	(13)
1997	Sevilla	21	(7)
1997–1999	Atlético Madrid	84	(20)
2000–2003	AC Milan	52	(5)
2002–2003	→ Atlético Madrid (loan)	31	(6)
2003–2007	Villarreal	113	(15)
2007–2008	Betis	21	(1)
2009–2010	Gimnàstic	49	(8)
2010–2013	Xerez	80	(27)
Total		476	(102)

International career
1996–1997	Spain U18	7	(6)
1998–2000	Spain U21	12	(5)
2000	Spain U23	5	(3)
2001–2003	Spain	4	(1)
Medal record
Men's football
Representing Spain
Olympic Games
Silver medal – second place	2000 Sydney	Team competition
- * Club domestic league appearances and goals

José María Romero Poyón (born 10 December 1978), known as José Mari, is a Spanish former professional footballer who played as a forward.

He amassed La Liga totals of 270 matches and 49 goals over eleven seasons, mainly with Atlético Madrid – for which he signed at the age of 18 from Sevilla, going on to score 34 times in 144 appearances – and Villarreal (four years apiece). He also played in Italy for AC Milan.

José Mari was a Spanish international in the 2000s.

== Club career ==
José Mari was born in Seville, Andalusia. After growing through the ranks of local Sevilla (first appearing with the main squad aged just 18, in a 2–0 defeat at Rayo Vallecano on 5 March 1997, and making 21 La Liga appearances with seven goals during that season, as his team was finally relegated), he signed with Atlético Madrid.

At Atlético, José Mari totalled 18 league goals in his first two seasons. Highlights included scoring at both home and away wins over Real Madrid in 1999 (separate seasons, both by 3–1); these happened to be Atlético's only competitive victories in the Madrid derby in a span covering almost 20 years.

José Mari failed to settle in Italy after a €19 million move to AC Milan in January 2000– Atlético were relegated at the end of the campaign– and was subsequently loaned to the Colchoneros for 2002–03, their first back in the top flight after a two-year absence. His second spell there was less successful, with the high point being a hat-trick in a 3–3 home draw against Athletic Bilbao on 10 November 2002.

José Mari agreed to a deal at Villarreal in the summer of 2003, for an undisclosed fee. He went on to play a key role in that year's UEFA Intertoto Cup triumph, and the side's best-ever league finish (third in 2004–05, with four goals in 30 matches).

In 2007, after falling out of favour at Villarreal with the arrival of Giuseppe Rossi and the recovery of longtime injury absentee Nihat Kahveci, José Mari returned to Seville, joining Real Betis on a one-year deal. He scored his first goal for his new club more than a year after his arrival, on 24 September 2008, in a 3–2 away loss to Barcelona; despite still having a contract running until June 2010, he was released in late December and, the following month, moved to Segunda División with Gimnàstic de Tarragona.

In June 2010, after one and a half seasons of regular playing time, with six league goals in his last year, José Mari became a free agent and was released. The following month, the 31-year-old signed for Xerez, recently relegated to the second tier. He netted a career-best 17 times in his first season – 33 games, all starts – helping his team to the eighth position.

== International career ==
José Mari represented Spain on four occasions in a two-year span. His debut came on 25 April 2001 as he played the second half of a 1–0 friendly win over Japan, in Córdoba.

Previously, José Mari was a member of the national squad which won the silver medal at the 2000 Summer Olympics in Sydney. He scored three goals during the competition.

== Post-retirement ==
After retiring, José Mari began practicing bodybuilding.

== Personal life ==
José Mari was the second cousin of fellow footballer Sergio Ramos.

== Career statistics ==
Scores and results list Spain's goal tally first, score column indicates score after each José Mari goal.

List of international goals scored by José Mari
No.	Date	Venue	Opponent	Score	Result	Competition
1	20 November 2002	Los Cármenes, Granada, Spain	Bulgaria	1–0	1–0	Friendly

== Honours ==
Villarreal

- UEFA Intertoto Cup: 2003, 2004

Spain U23

- Summer Olympic silver medal: 2000
