= Diego Alonso =

Uruguayan footballer and coach (born 1975)

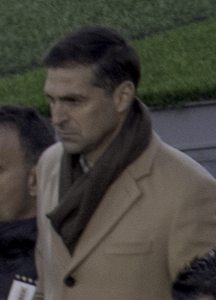
- Alonso in 2022

Personal information
- Full name: Diego Martín Alonso López
- Date of birth: 16 April 1975 (age 51)
- Place of birth: Montevideo, Uruguay
- Height: 1.88 m (6 ft 2 in)
- Position: Striker

Youth career
- 1993–1995: Bella Vista

Senior career*
Years	Team	Apps	(Gls)
1995–1999	Bella Vista	38	(19)
1999–2000	Gimnasia La Plata	32	(17)
2000–2002	Valencia	20	(2)
2001–2002	→ Atlético Madrid (loan)	38	(22)
2002–2003	Racing Santander	23	(1)
2003–2004	Málaga	23	(6)
2004–2005	UNAM	27	(12)
2005–2006	Murcia	25	(2)
2006	Nacional	7	(3)
2007	Shanghai Shenhua	13	(7)
2008–2009	Gimnasia La Plata	36	(5)
2009–2011	Peñarol	43	(17)
Total		325	(114)

International career
1999–2001	Uruguay	7	(0)

Managerial career
- 2011–2012: Bella Vista
- 2012–2013: Guaraní
- 2013: Peñarol
- 2014: Olimpia
- 2014–2018: Pachuca
- 2018–2019: Monterrey
- 2019–2021: Inter Miami
- 2021–2023: Uruguay
- 2023: Sevilla
- 2024: Panathinaikos
- * Club domestic league appearances and goals

Diego Martín Alonso López (Spanish pronunciation: [ˈdjeɣo aˈlonso]; born 16 April 1975) is an Uruguayan professional football manager and former player who played as a striker.

Other than in his own country, he played football in Argentina, Spain, Mexico and China in a 16-year career, notably winning the 2001–02 Segunda División with Atlético Madrid while being crowned top scorer. He represented Uruguay at the 1999 Copa América.

Alonso began working as a coach in 2011, being in charge of clubs in Uruguay, Paraguay, Mexico and the United States and leading Pachuca to the 2016 Clausura and the 2016–17 CONCACAF Champions League titles. In December 2021, he was appointed at the Uruguay national side, coaching them at the 2022 World Cup and leaving his position following a group stage exit. He signed for Sevilla in October 2023, being dismissed two months later.

== Playing career ==
=== Club ===
Alonso was born in Montevideo, the country's capital. He made his professional debut with Bella Vista where he remained four seasons, helping the side to the Uruguayan Segunda División title in 1997.

After a brief spell in Argentina for Gimnasia La Plata (he would also represent the club towards the end of his career), Alonso moved to Spain, where he played with five teams in as many years: Valencia, Atlético Madrid (where he scored 22 goals in 2001–02's Segunda División, helping the Colchoneros to return to La Liga and forming an efficient attacking partnership with countryman Fernando Correa, who added 13), Racing de Santander, Málaga and Real Murcia, where he did not have a good scoring record overall. In between his fourth and fifth club, he played one year in Mexico with UNAM.

In 2006, the 31-year-old Alonso returned to his country and joined hometown's Nacional. However, shortly after, he moved abroad again, signing with Shanghai Shenhua in the Chinese Super League; after two seasons with Gimnasia, the veteran switched to Peñarol.

=== International ===
Alonso made seven appearances for the Uruguay national team in two years. His debut came on 17 June 1999 in a 3–2 friendly win over Paraguay, in Ciudad del Este.

Alonso was chosen for the nation's squad for that year's Copa América, and scored on his quarter-final penalty shootout attempt (5–3 victory) for the eventual runners-up, also against Paraguay, the hosts. In spite of his season with Atlético he was not selected for the 2002 FIFA World Cup, and subsequently criticised manager Víctor Púa.

== Coaching career ==
=== Early career ===
Alonso started working as a manager in 2011, being in charge in quick succession of Bella Vista, Guaraní, Peñarol and Olimpia (the second and fourth sides from the Paraguayan Primera División).

=== Pachuca ===
In December 2014, Alonso was appointed at Pachuca of the Mexican Liga MX. He led them to the 2016 Clausura and the subsequent edition of the CONCACAF Champions League. On 4 May 2018, he was released.

=== Monterrey ===
On 2 June 2018, Alonso was named coach of Monterrey. In May of the following year, after the 2–1 aggregate victory over Tigres UANL in the Champions League final, he became the first manager to win the competition with two different clubs. On 30 September 2019, following a 2–0 loss to the same opposition that left his team in 12th place on the general table, he was dismissed.

=== Inter Miami ===
On 30 December 2019, Alonso was announced as the inaugural head coach of Major League Soccer side Inter Miami. On 7 January 2021, he left by mutual consent.

=== Uruguay national team ===
Alonso was appointed manager of Uruguay on 14 December 2021, replacing Óscar Tabárez who had occupied the position for the previous 15 years. On 24 March 2022, after four wins in his first four games in charge, he secured qualification for the World Cup in Qatar. In December, after failing to progress from the group stage in the finals, he presented his resignation and cited his desire to return to club duties.

=== Sevilla ===
On 10 October 2023, Alonso was named manager of Sevilla, taking over from José Luis Mendilibar; the side stood 14th in the table at the time of his arrival. On 16 December, having failed to win in eight league matches and having been eliminated from the UEFA Champions League group stage as last, he was dismissed.

=== Panathinaikos ===
On 10 June 2024, Alonso signed a two-year contract with Panathinaikos of Super League Greece. He was sacked on 29 October, with his team eighth in the table.

== Personal life ==
Alonso is a cousin of Iván Alonso, who also played several years in Spain, mainly with Alavés.

His uncle Daniel represented Sevilla and Castellón in the 70s.

== Managerial statistics ==
As of 27 October 2024

Managerial record by team and tenure
Team	Nation	From	To	Record				
Team	Nation	From	To	G	W	D	L	Win %
Bella Vista	(Uruguay)	14 September 2011	4 June 2012	25	9	3	13	36.00
Guaraní	(Paraguay)	12 July 2012	18 June 2013	48	25	12	11	52.08
Peñarol	(Uruguay)	19 June 2013	6 October 2013	8	1	3	4	12.50
Olimpia	(Paraguay)	11 March 2014	5 October 2014	30	14	7	9	46.67
Pachuca	(Mexico)	4 December 2014	10 May 2018	173	74	46	53	42.77
Monterrey	(Mexico)	10 May 2018	30 September 2019	72	38	14	20	52.78
Inter Miami	(United States)	30 December 2019	7 January 2021	24	7	3	14	29.17
Uruguay	(Uruguay)	14 December 2021	28 February 2023	12	8	2	2	66.67
Sevilla	(Spain)	10 October 2023	16 December 2023	14	2	5	7	14.29
Panathinaikos	(Greece)	10 June 2024	29 October 2024	17	7	5	5	41.18
Total				422	184	100	138	43.60

== Honours ==
=== Player ===
Bella Vista

- Uruguayan Segunda División: 1997

Atlético Madrid

- Segunda División: 2001–02

UNAM

- Liga MX: Apertura 2004
- Campeón de Campeones: 2004

Shanghai

- A3 Champions Cup: 2007

Peñarol

- Uruguayan Primera División: 2009–10
- Copa Libertadores runner-up: 2011

Uruguay

- Copa América runner-up: 1999

Individual

- Pichichi Trophy (Segunda División): 2001–02

=== Manager ===
Pachuca

- Liga MX: Clausura 2016
- CONCACAF Champions League: 2016–17
- Copa MX runner–up: Apertura 2017
- FIFA Club World Cup third place: 2017

Monterrey

- CONCACAF Champions League: 2019

Individual

- CONCACAF Champions League Team of the Tournament: 2019
