= Fernando Correa =

Uruguayan footballer and manager (born 1974)

Personal information
- Full name: Fernando Edgardo Correa Ayala
- Date of birth: 6 January 1974 (age 52)
- Place of birth: Montevideo, Uruguay
- Height: 1.79 m (5 ft 10 in)
- Position: Striker

Senior career*
| Years | Team | Apps | (Gls) |
| 1992–1995 | River Plate (Uruguay) | 33 | (13) |
| 1995–2003 | Atlético Madrid | 141 | (34) |
| 1996–1998 | → Racing Santander (loan) | 72 | (27) |
| 2003–2005 | Mallorca | 36 | (8) |
| 2005–2006 | Valladolid | 6 | (1) |
| 2006 | River Plate (Uruguay) | 10 | (0) |
| 2007 | Shanghai Shenhua | 4 | (0) |
| 2007–2009 | Peñarol | 25 | (5) |
| 2009–2011 | River Plate (Uruguay) | 35 | (7) |
| Total | | 362 | (95) |

International career
| 1994–2004 | Uruguay | 4 | (0) |

Managerial career
- 2011–2012: Bella Vista (assistant)
- 2012–2013: Guaraní (assistant)
- 2013: Peñarol (assistant)
- 2014: Olimpia (assistant)
- 2014–2017: Pachuca (assistant)
- 2018: Cerro
- * Club domestic league appearances and goals

Fernando Edgardo Correa Ayala (born 6 January 1974) is a Uruguayan retired footballer who played as a striker, and is a current manager.

Having represented in his country River Plate and Peñarol, he had a lengthy spell in Spain with Atlético Madrid. He also competed professionally in China.

== Club career ==
After four seasons with local Club Atlético River Plate, Montevideo-born Correa moved abroad to Atlético Madrid, making his La Liga debut on 10 September 1995 against Racing de Santander. Incidentally, he would be loaned for two years to the Cantabrians, scoring 27 league goals in that period which was enough to earn a return to the Spanish capital. There, however, he would never be more than a decent attacking backup, at least in the top level; he did form an efficient partnership with compatriot Diego Alonso in 2001–02, as the Colchoneros returned to the top tier after two years, combining for 35 league goals.

After a two-year stint with RCD Mallorca and a further six games for Real Valladolid (Segunda División), Correa returned to Uruguay and River Plate, signing for Peñarol after a short stint with China's Shanghai Shenhua FC. In 2009, the 35-year-old rejoined his first professional club.

Following his retirement, Correa worked as assistant to Alonso in several teams. He had his first head coach experience in January 2018, being appointed at C.A. Cerro. In December of the same year, after a spell that included 16 Uruguayan Primera División matches without one loss, he left.

== International career ==
An intermittent Uruguay full international (one match in 1994, another in 1998 and two in 2004), Correa previously represented the nation at the 1993 FIFA World Youth Championship. He made his debut for the senior team on 19 October 1994 (aged 20), in a friendly match with Peru in the Estadio Nacional José Díaz in Lima, replacing Darío Silva in the 78th minute of the 1–0 win.

In 2004, as he was a Mallorca player at the service of the national team, Correa tested positive for cocaine and was suspended for one year, also being immediately released by Atlético. Upon appeal, it was reduced to nine months.

== Honours ==
Atlético Madrid

- La Liga: 1995–96
- Copa del Rey: 1995–96
- Segunda División: 2001–02

Peñarol

- Clausura 2008
