= Jorge Otero =

Spanish footballer (born 1969)

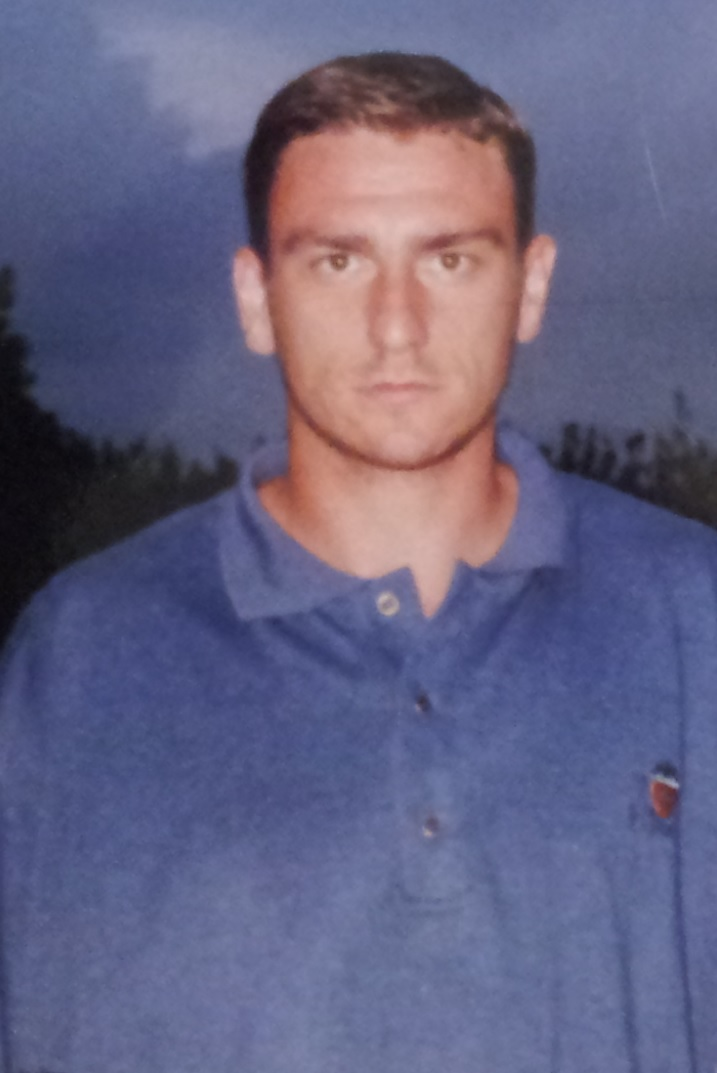
- Otero as a Valencia player

Personal information
- Full name: Jorge Otero Bouzas
- Date of birth: 28 January 1969 (age 57)
- Place of birth: Nigrán, Spain
- Height: 1.75 m (5 ft 9 in)
- Position: Full-back

Youth career
- Celta

Senior career*
Years	Team	Apps	(Gls)
1986–1987	Celta B		
1987–1994	Celta	222	(4)
1994–1997	Valencia	84	(0)
1997–2001	Betis	82	(0)
2001–2003	Atlético Madrid	32	(1)
2003–2005	Elche	46	(1)
Total		466	(6)

International career
1988–1989	Spain U21	2	(0)
1993–1996	Spain	9	(0)

Managerial career
- 2014–2016: Rápido Bouzas
- 2016–2018: Arosa
- 2018: Rápido Bouzas
- 2020–2021: Alondras
- 2021–2022: Arosa
- * Club domestic league appearances and goals

Jorge Otero Bouzas (born 28 January 1969) is a Spanish former professional footballer who played as either a right or left-back, currently a manager.

He appeared in 317 La Liga games over 12 seasons in representation of four teams, mainly Celta.

Otero represented Spain at the 1994 World Cup and Euro 1996.

== Club career ==
Otero was born in Nigrán, Province of Pontevedra, Galicia. He started playing for local powerhouse RC Celta de Vigo, being an undisputed starter since the age of 18 and spending five of his seven years with the first team in La Liga. He made his debut in the Spanish top division on 29 August 1987, featuring the full 90 minutes in a 1–0 away win against RCD Español.

In the summer of 1994, Otero signed for Valencia CF, achieving a personal best – in the top flight – runner-up place in the 1995–96 season to which he contributed 37 games. Until his retirement in 2005, he still represented Real Betis (with whom he was promoted and relegated), Atlético Madrid and Elche CF, the latter club exclusively in the Segunda División.

== International career ==
Otero made his debut for the Spain national team on 8 September 1993, in a 2–0 friendly victory over Chile in Alicante. He was a participant at the 1994 FIFA World Cup (two matches) and UEFA Euro 1996 (one).

Otero earned nine caps in three years, and his last appearance was in the latter tournament, in a 1–1 group stage draw against France.

== Honours ==
Celta

- Segunda División: 1991–92

Atlético Madrid

- Segunda División: 2001–02
