= Txomin Nagore =

Spanish footballer (born 1974)

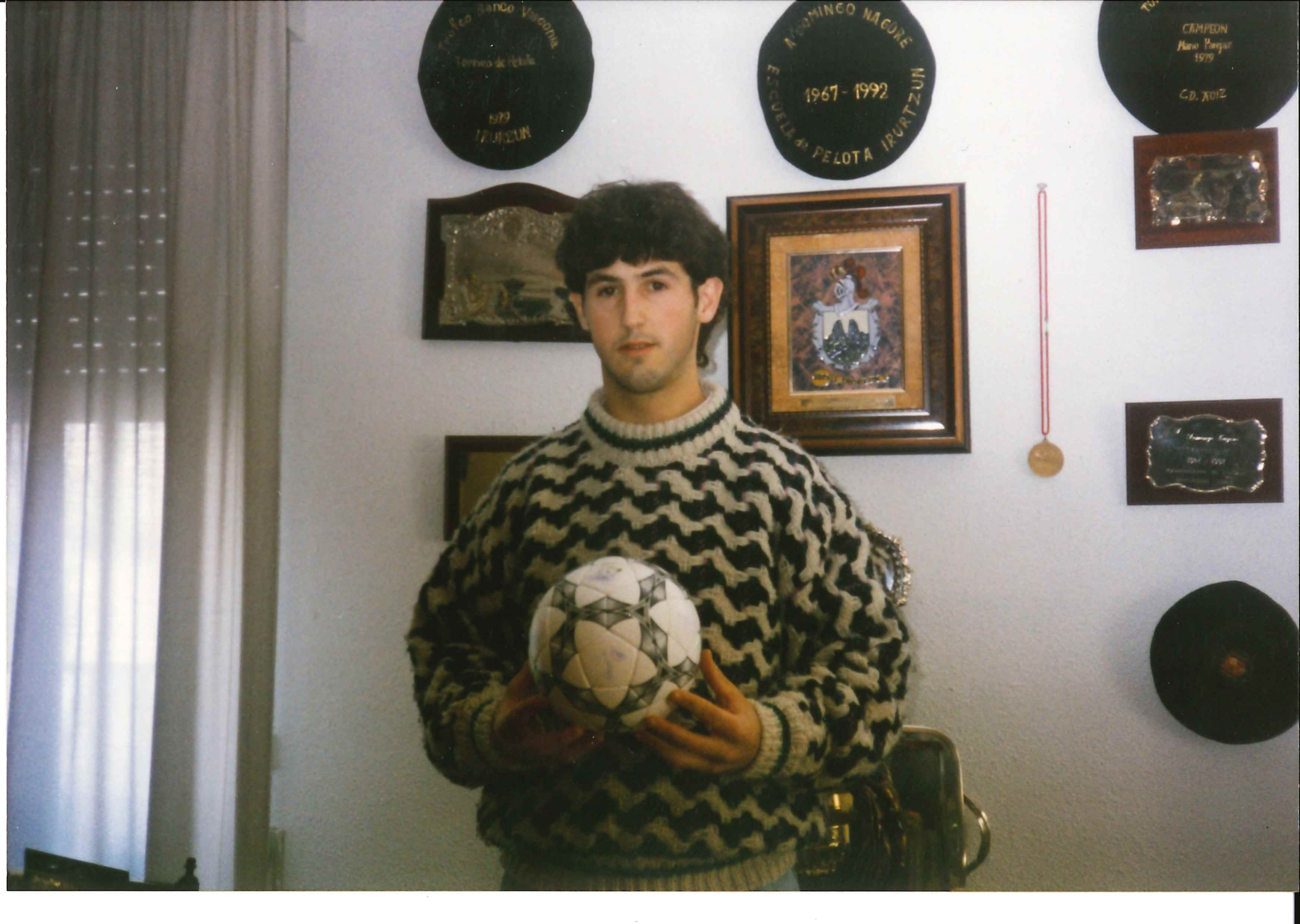
- Nagore in 1996

Personal information
- Full name: Txomin Nagore Arbizu
- Date of birth: 26 August 1974 (age 52)
- Place of birth: Irurtzun, Spain
- Height: 1.82 m (6 ft 0 in)
- Position: Defensive midfielder

Youth career
- 1991–1993: Osasuna

Senior career*
Years	Team	Apps	(Gls)
1993–1996	Osasuna B	45	(1)
1995–1997	Osasuna	45	(1)
1997–1999	Athletic Bilbao	26	(0)
1999–2001	Numancia	73	(3)
2001–2003	Atlético Madrid	55	(3)
2003–2004	Mallorca	21	(0)
2004–2005	Celta	30	(2)
2005–2006	Levante	23	(1)
2006–2013	Numancia	230	(12)
2013–2014	Mirandés	26	(1)
2014–2016	Iruña	65	(13)
Total		639	(37)

International career
2000	Basque Country	1	(0)
2003–2005	Navarre	3	(1)
- * Club domestic league appearances and goals

Txomin Nagore Arbizu (Domingo in Spanish; born 26 August 1974) is a Spanish former professional footballer who played as a defensive midfielder.

He amassed La Liga totals of 168 matches and four goals over eight seasons, representing Athletic Bilbao, Numancia, Atlético Madrid and Mallorca. Starting out at Osasuna, he added 361 appearances in the Segunda División, mainly with Numancia.

== Club career ==
Nagore was born in Irurtzun, Navarre. A product of CA Osasuna's youth system, he made his La Liga debut with Athletic Bilbao, playing 17 La Liga games in the club's 1997–98 runner-up league campaign; he first appeared in the competition on 6 September 1997, starting in a 1–1 away draw against Real Betis.

Nagore went on to represent CD Numancia, Atlético Madrid– playing a career-best 40 matches in the 2001–02 season as the Colchoneros returned to the top flight, while adding three goals– RCD Mallorca, RC Celta de Vigo and Levante UD, always being a regularly used defensive unit albeit in few starts.

In summer 2006, Nagore returned to Numancia, being a key element in the side's top-tier return in his second year. In the following season he was also regularly played, but the Sorians were immediately relegated.

On 9 May 2013, Nagore featured the full 90 minutes against Córdoba CF (1–0 home win) for his 500th game as a professional. In the off-season, after a further 235 competitive appearances for Numancia, the 39-year-old signed with fellow Segunda División club CD Mirandés.

== Personal life ==
Nagore's older brother, Jorge (born 1971), played Basque pelota.

== Honours ==
Atlético Madrid

- Segunda División: 2001–02

Numancia

- Segunda División: 2007–08
