= Jesús Muñoz (footballer) =

Spanish footballer (born 1976)

Personal information
- Full name: Jesús Muñoz Calonge
- Date of birth: 1 January 1976 (age 50)
- Place of birth: Mota del Cuervo, Spain
- Height: 1.80 m (5 ft 11 in)
- Position: Midfielder

Youth career
- Albacete

Senior career*
Years	Team	Apps	(Gls)
1995–2001	Albacete	198	(15)
2001–2002	Atlético Madrid	12	(0)
2002–2006	Deportivo La Coruña	1	(0)
2002–2004	→ Zaragoza (loan)	33	(1)
2004–2005	→ Terrassa (loan)	34	(0)
2006–2007	Alcalá		
2007–2008	Villarrobledo		
Total		278+	(16+)

Managerial career
- 2012–2016: Rayo Vallecano (assistant)
- 2016: Granada (assistant)
- 2017–2018: Changchun Yatai (assistant)
- 2018–2019: Almería (assistant)
- 2019: Hércules
- * Club domestic league appearances and goals

Jesús Muñoz Calonge (born 1 January 1976) is a Spanish former professional footballer who played as a central midfielder.

== Playing career ==
=== Albacete ===
Born in Mota del Cuervo, Province of Cuenca, Castilla–La Mancha, Muñoz was an Albacete Balompié youth graduate. On 2 September 1995, aged 19, he made his first-team – and La Liga – debut, starting in a 3–0 away loss against Sporting de Gijón.

Muñoz was first-choice option during the 1995–96 season, which ended in relegation. He continued to feature regularly for Alba in the following campaigns, scoring his first professional goal on 10 November 1996 in a 3–1 Segunda División away win over Atlético Madrid B.

=== Atlético Madrid ===
On 10 July 2001, Muñoz signed for Atlético Madrid, recently relegated to the second division. He only made 13 competitive appearances during his spell, achieving top-flight promotion as champions.

=== Deportivo ===
In summer 2002, Muñoz joined Deportivo de La Coruña and was immediately loaned to Real Zaragoza of the second tier. On 31 August 2004, he moved to Terrassa FC in the same league and also in a temporary deal.

Returning to Dépor in 2005, Muñoz only featured in one league match (17 minutes in a 2–1 away defeat of CA Osasuna on 26 February 2006) before leaving the club. He subsequently represented amateurs RSD Alcalá and CP Villarrobledo, retiring with the latter at the age of 32.

== Coaching career ==
In 2012, Muñoz was appointed assistant of Paco Jémez at Rayo Vallecano. He followed Jémez to Granada CF, but after the manager left for Cruz Azul they ended their partnership.

On 7 December 2017, Muñoz was announced as Chen Jingang's assistant at Changchun Yatai F.C. of the Chinese Super League. The following 5 July, he joined Fran Fernández's staff at UD Almería in the same capacity.

Muñoz was given his first head coach job on 22 September 2019, at Segunda División B's Hércules CF. He was dismissed on 9 December, having taken 12 points from 11 games and with the side in the relegation zone.

== Managerial statistics ==
As of match played 8 December 2019

Managerial record by team and tenure
Team	Nat	From	To	Record								Ref
Team	Nat	From	To	G	W	D	L	GF	GA	GD	Win %	Ref
Hércules	(Spain)	23 September 2019	9 December 2019	11	3	3	5	14	14	+0	27.27	
Total				11	3	3	5	14	14	+0	27.27	—

== Honours ==
=== Player ===
Atlético Madrid

- Segunda División: 2001–02
