= Luis Aragonés =

Spanish football player and manager (1938–2014)

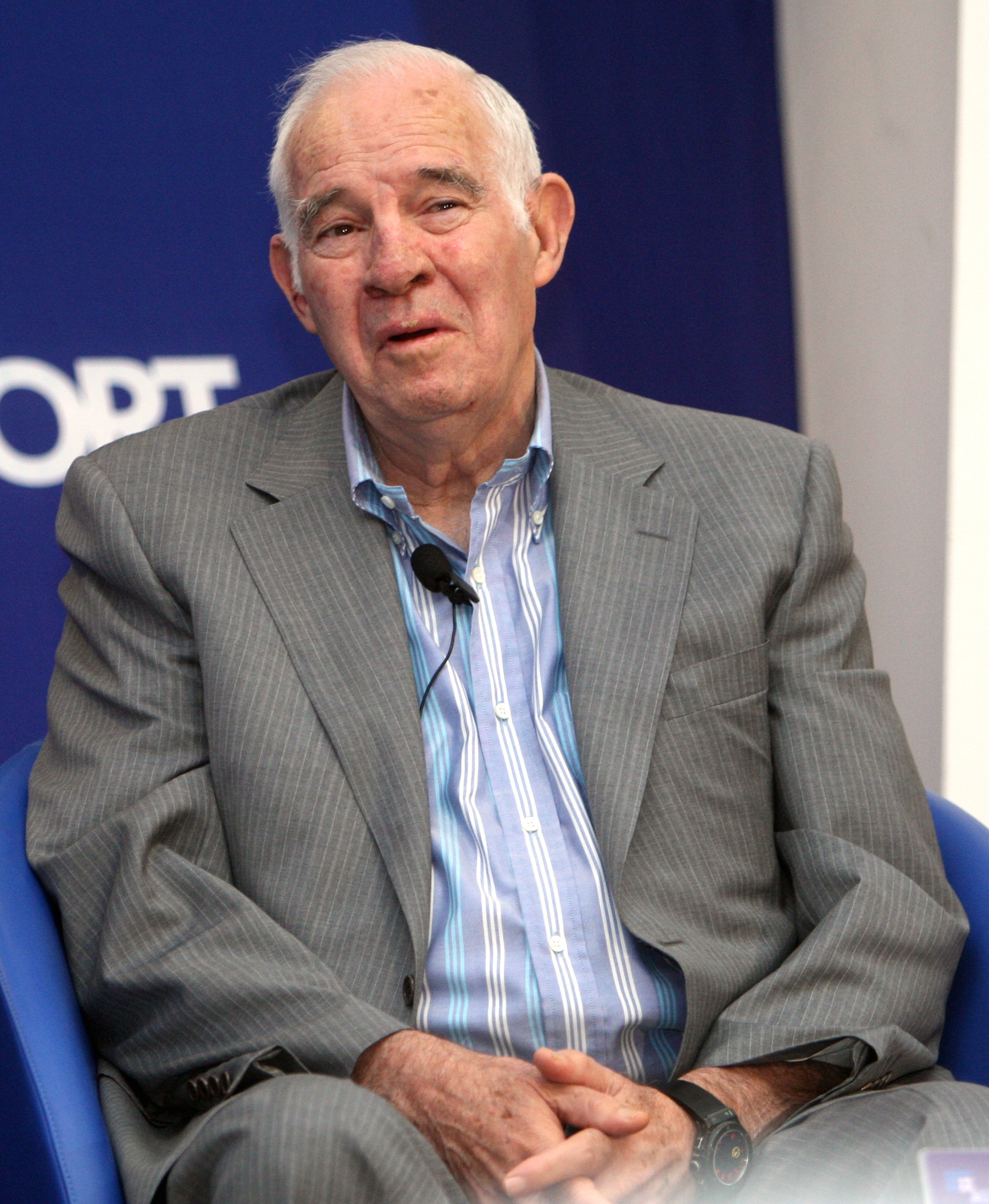
- Aragonés in 2011

Personal information
- Full name: José Luis Aragonés Suárez Martínez
- Date of birth: 28 July 1938
- Place of birth: Hortaleza, Madrid, Spain
- Date of death: 1 February 2014 (aged 75)
- Place of death: Fuencarral-El Pardo, Madrid, Spain
- Positions: Midfielder; forward

Senior career*
Years	Team	Apps	(Gls)
1957–1958	Getafe Deportivo		
1958–1960	Real Madrid	0	(0)
1958–1959	→ Recreativo Huelva (loan)		
1959–1960	→ Hércules (loan)	24	(17)
1960	→ Úbeda (loan)		
1960	Plus Ultra	8	(11)
1960–1961	Oviedo	13	(4)
1961–1964	Betis	82	(33)
1964–1974	Atlético Madrid	265	(123)
Total		392	(188)

International career
1964–1972	Spain	11	(3)

Managerial career
- 1974–1978: Atlético Madrid
- 1978: Atlético Madrid
- 1979–1980: Atlético Madrid
- 1981: Betis
- 1982–1986: Atlético Madrid
- 1987: Atlético Madrid
- 1987–1988: Barcelona
- 1990–1991: Espanyol
- 1991–1993: Atlético Madrid
- 1993–1995: Sevilla
- 1995–1996: Valencia
- 1997–1998: Betis
- 1999–2000: Oviedo
- 2000–2001: Mallorca
- 2001–2003: Atlético Madrid
- 2003–2004: Mallorca
- 2004–2008: Spain
- 2008–2009: Fenerbahçe
Medal record
Men's football
Representing Spain (as manager)
UEFA European Championship
Winner	2008
- * Club domestic league appearances and goals

Luis Aragonés Suárez (Spanish pronunciation: [ˈlwis aɾaɣoˈnes ˈswaɾeθ]; 28 July 1938 – 1 February 2014) was a Spanish football player and manager.

Aragonés spent the majority of his career as a player and coach at Atlético Madrid. He was a prominent player and then coach of the successful Atlético team of the late 1960s and early 1970s. The team were national champions four times, reached the 1974 European Cup Final. Between 1964 and 1974, he played 265 Primera Liga games for Atlético and scored 123 goals. He also played for several other clubs, including Real Madrid, and played 11 times for Spain, scoring three goals.

Apart from Atlético he also coached seven other La Liga clubs as well as the Spain national team, whom he led to their second European Championship title in 2008. He then became the head coach of the Turkish club Fenerbahçe after the tournament, the only time he coached outside his native Spain.

== Playing career ==
=== Early career ===
Aragonés began his playing career with Getafe Deportivo in 1957. In 1958, he signed for Real Madrid but never made it into the senior team. He spent most of his time at Real Madrid on loan to other clubs, including Recreativo de Huelva and Hércules and playing for AD Plus Ultra, the Real Madrid reserve team. In 1960, he joined Real Oviedo and made his debut in the Primera División. Between 1961 and 1964, he played for Real Betis, making 86 league appearances and scoring 33 goals.

=== Atlético Madrid ===
In 1964, Aragonés was signed by Atlético Madrid where he acquired the nickname "Zapatones", meaning "big boots", since he was known as a free kick specialist. Aragonés picked up silverware in his first season at the club, winning the Copa del Rey (then known as the Copa del Generalísimo). He then helped Atlético to win the La Liga title in 1965–66 and again in 1969–70, where he shared the Pichichi trophy for the highest scorer in the league with his fellow Atlético forward José Eulogio Gárate and Real Madrid's Amancio. A second Copa followed in 1972 and the team achieved a third league title in 1972–73. The following year, Atlético reached the final of the European Cup played against German champions Bayern Munich. During the match, Aragonés scored a goal late in extra time to give Atlético a 1–0 lead. A 119th-minute equaliser from Georg Schwarzenbeck, however, sent the final to a replay, where Bayern prevailed with a convincing 4–0 victory. His retirement followed soon after and he was appointed Atlético coach for the first time in the same year. Until 2024, Aragonés remained Atlético's all-time top goalscorer and is ninth in the club's all-time appearance list.

=== International ===
Aragonés made his international debut for Spain on 8 May 1965 in a 0–0 friendly draw away to Scotland. The first of his three goals for Spain was in a friendly against France in Lyon, in a 3–1 win on his seventh cap on 17 October 1968. He captained the side for the sole time on his 10th of 11 caps, a 3–0 win over Northern Ireland in Seville on 11 November 1970 in qualification for UEFA Euro 1972. He scored in the match.

== Managerial career ==
=== Spanish clubs ===
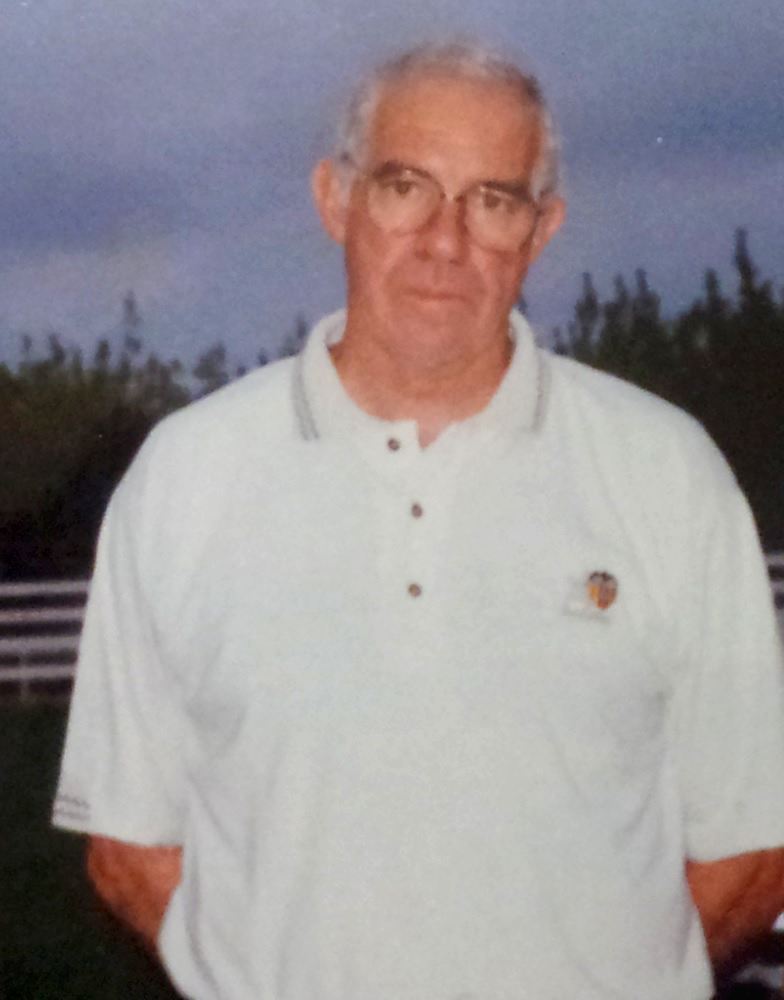
Aragonés as Valencia manager in 1995–96

In his first season in charge at Atlético Madrid, Aragonés led Atlético to success over two legs in the 1974 Intercontinental Cup, where the team beat Copa Libertadores winners Independiente of Argentina 2–1 on aggregate. Atlético went on to claim the Copa del Generalísimo and La Liga title in 1976 and 1977 respectively.

Aragonés took over at Real Betis in 1981. His time in Andalusia, however, was brief and he returned to the Vicente Calderón in 1982. In his fourth spell at the club, his Atlético side came close to achieving a historic double during the 1984–85 season, winning the Copa del Rey and finishing runner-up in La Liga. The following season, the team reached the final of the European Cup Winners' Cup, where it was beaten 3–0 by Dynamo Kyiv.

Aragonés' success saw him appointed as manager of Barcelona in 1987, where he spent one season, winning the Copa del Rey. He then spent a season at fellow Barcelona based club Espanyol before rejoining Atlético for a fifth spell, where he won the sixth Copa del Rey of his career in 1992.

After leaving the club for a fifth time in 1993, he went on to coach Sevilla, Valencia, Real Betis, Real Oviedo and Mallorca. His biggest success during this period was in the 1995–96 season coming within four points of winning the La Liga title with Valencia.

In 2001, with the club in the Segunda División, Aragonés took over at Atlético for a sixth time and led the team to promotion back to the Primera División as champions in the 2001–02 season. He left the club for the seventh and final time in 2003 and remains its most successful manager with eight trophies won.

Aragonés returned to Mallorca on 2 October of the 2003–04 season, after the dismissal of Jaime Pacheco for a poor start to the season. He steered the club to 11th by the end of the season. On 1 July 2004, he took the job of Spain national team after Iñaki Sáez resigned due to public disapproval for failing to qualify the team from the group stage at UEFA Euro 2004.

=== Spain national football team ===
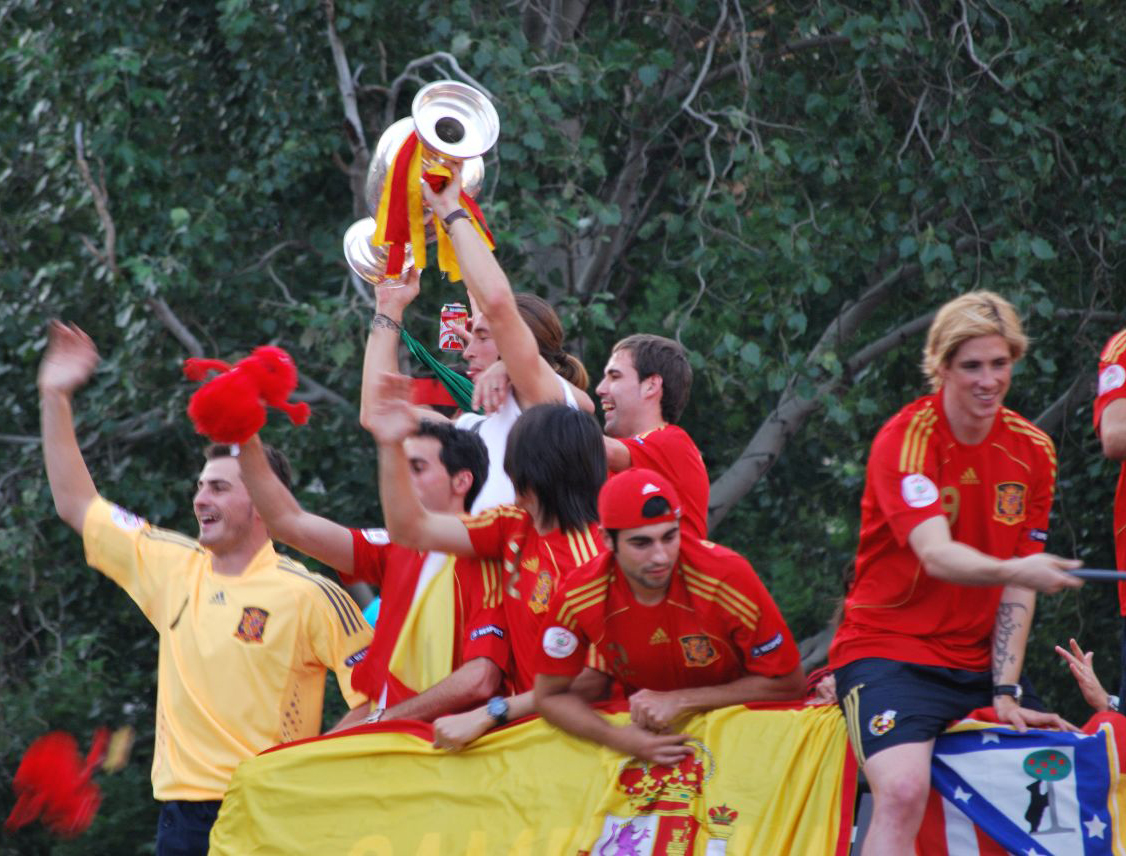
Spanish players celebrating in Madrid after victory at Euro 2008 under Aragonés

On taking over the national team following the UEFA Euro 2004 humiliation, Aragonés made changes to the team, dropping experienced players such as Míchel Salgado and Raúl and revamped with some new blood. Spain were unbeaten in qualification for the 2006 FIFA World Cup under Aragonés, but finished as group runner-up to Serbia and Montenegro, and thus required a play-off against Slovakia to secure their place. Spain won the play-off 6–2 on aggregate, with Luis García scoring a hat-trick in the first-leg 5–1 win. At the finals, Spain won all three group games before facing France in the Second Round. After taking the lead through David Villa, they lost 3–1 following goals from Franck Ribéry, Patrick Vieira and Zinedine Zidane. Realizing the physical weakness of Spanish players, he employed tiki-taka, a system of short passing which subsequently would also be identified with the playing style of Barcelona, and became the biggest football revolution in the history of Spanish football.

Aragonés stayed on as manager and presided over the following qualifications for the European Championship. The initial phase of the qualifiers started on a poor note with a 3–2 defeat to Northern Ireland and a 2–0 defeat to Sweden both away from home, a pair of results that put tremendous pressure on Aragonés' position. Spain recovered strongly to seal a ticket as group winners ahead of Sweden that also qualified directly to the tournament, while Denmark missed out.

Aragonés then presided over Spain's victorious campaign at Euro 2008, beating Germany 1–0 in the final with a goal from Fernando Torres for their first international honour since 1964. Aragonés had a superstitious fear of the colour yellow, and referred to Spain's change kit for the semi-final match against Russia as "mustard" and not "yellow".

His tiki-taka style of play was retained by his successor, Vicente del Bosque, who led Spain to further tournament victories.

=== Fenerbahçe ===
After denying an approach in late June, Aragonés replaced Zico as manager of Turkish Süper Lig club Fenerbahçe on 5 July 2008. He signed a two-year deal and declared his intention to win the league title in his first season. The club, however, finished in fourth, and he was dismissed on 2 June 2009 after the season had ended.

== Managerial statistics ==
Managerial record by team and tenure
Team	Nat	From	To	Record					Ref.
Team	Nat	From	To	G	W	D	L	Win %	Ref.
Atlético Madrid	(Spain)	26 November 1974	8 May 1978	169	84	36	49	49.70	
Atlético Madrid	(Spain)	10 October 1978	7 November 1978	5	3	2	0	60.00	
Atlético Madrid	(Spain)	5 June 1979	17 March 1980	35	14	11	10	40.00	
Betis	(Spain)	29 April 1981	20 September 1981	3	2	0	1	66.67	
Atlético Madrid	(Spain)	27 April 1982	10 June 1986	210	110	46	54	52.38	
Atlético Madrid	(Spain)	3 February 1987	28 June 1987	25	13	3	9	52.00	
Barcelona	(Spain)	23 September 1987	23 May 1988	50	23	13	14	46.00	
Espanyol	(Spain)	12 June 1990	11 June 1991	46	17	12	17	36.96	
Atlético Madrid	(Spain)	11 June 1991	2 February 1993	79	44	15	20	55.70	
Sevilla	(Spain)	22 June 1993	19 June 1995	90	38	26	26	42.22	
Valencia	(Spain)	28 June 1995	17 November 1996	69	37	13	19	53.62	
Betis	(Spain)	30 June 1997	16 May 1998	48	21	11	16	43.75	
Oviedo	(Spain)	23 June 1999	22 May 2000	44	14	13	17	31.82	
Mallorca	(Spain)	27 May 2000	24 June 2001	44	25	11	8	56.82	
Atlético Madrid	(Spain)	24 June 2001	23 June 2003	87	39	22	26	44.83	
Mallorca	(Spain)	9 October 2003	1 July 2004	40	17	5	18	42.50	
Spain	(Spain)	1 July 2004	30 June 2008	54	38	12	4	70.37	
Fenerbahçe	(Turkey)	5 July 2008	2 June 2009	53	28	11	14	52.83	
Career total				1,151	567	262	322	49.26	—

== Honours ==
=== Player ===
Atlético Madrid

- La Liga: 1965–66, 1969–70, 1972–73
- Copa del Rey: 1964–65, 1971–72
- European Cup runner-up: 1974

==== Individual ====
- Pichichi Trophy: 1969–70
- Atlético Madrid's second all-time leading top scorer: 172 goals

=== Manager ===
Atlético Madrid

- La Liga: 1976–77
- Copa del Rey: 1975–76, 1984–85, 1991–92
- Supercopa de España: 1985
- Segunda División: 2001–02
- Intercontinental Cup: 1974

Barcelona

- Copa del Rey: 1987–88

Spain

- UEFA European Championship: 2008

==== Individual ====
- Don Balón Award (Best Coach): 1976–77
- Marca Leyenda: 2008
- IFFHS World's Best National Coach: 2008
- Gold Medal of the Community of Madrid: 2014

== Thierry Henry controversy ==
In 2004, Aragonés was appointed coach of Spain. During a training session in the same year, a Spanish TV crew filmed Aragonés making offensive comments to José Antonio Reyes about Reyes' black Arsenal teammate Thierry Henry, saying:

Tell that black shit that you are much better than him. Don't hold back, tell him. Tell him from me. You have to believe in yourself, you're better than that black shit.

The incident caused uproar in the English media, with calls for Aragonés to be sacked or suspended of his duties, however the Spanish Football Federation stated that "his offence has not been deemed serious enough to warrant a suspension of his duties, or his sacking" After an investigation into the events during the match, UEFA fined the Royal Spanish Football Federation 100,000 Swiss francs/US$87,000 and warned that any future incidents would be punished more severely. UEFA noted that possible punishments could include suspension from major international tournaments or the closure of Spain's home international matches to supporters.

In response to this, Aragonés said in public that he was not a racist, and claimed that he had black friends. Brazilian-born black midfielder Marcos Senna stated:

He is not a racist. Aragonés is a spectacular person. [Former Spain defender] Donato, who is black, is one of his best friends. Maybe something escaped, a word, and he was misinterpreted. He helped a lot bringing me to the Spain team, and the fact people thought he was racist was minimised by the fact he called me. I see the way he treats me and how he likes me. 'He calls me "The Brazilian". Sometimes I take a free-kick in training and he shouts, "Hey Brazilian, don't take it that way, hit a folha seca [falling leaf] like Nelinho [scorer of a World Cup goal in 1978]." He is a surprising guy, because he is really serious, but then he comes with jokes. The guys adore Aragonés.

Aragonés also responded to the controversy by saying to a group of reporters: "You are like wolves after the deer. You are kids. You don't know anything, but I am nearly 70. I have a lot of black friends who have explained to me that the English were after them in the colonies." These comments were criticised by Bobby Barnes, a member of the Professional Footballers' Association's executive and a trustee of the football anti-racism organisation Kick It Out, who suggested that Aragonés' comments on colonialism were an attempt "...to justify his offensive and disgraceful statement".

== Death and legacy ==
Aragonés died on 1 February 2014 in Clínica CEMTRO hospital, Madrid, from leukemia.

The Royal Spanish Football Federation released a statement of "grief and shock" at the death of the man who was the coach at "the start of its most glorious era of successes on the world stage". Diego Simeone, incumbent manager of Atlético Madrid, spoke on the day of Aragonés' death, saying, "From here I want to send a very strong message to his family. Everyone at Atletico is hurting at the loss of such an important part of the club and for the Spanish football." Aragonés' successor as the coach of Spain national football team, Vicente Del Bosque gave his word, "We've woken up to a sad news. Luis has been the father of the successes for the National Team. We are in his hall and I think we will always carry him in our memory."

His funeral was held on 2 February in Madrid with the attendance including Spanish players Carles Puyol, Cesc Fàbregas, Andrés Iniesta and Xavi. He was buried in the cemetery of La Paz in Alcobendas.

At the 2014 UEFA Champions League Final, Atlético Madrid wore shirts with Aragonés' name written in gold inside the collar.

Atlético Madrid pays tribute to Aragonés in the club membership cards for 2019–20 season.

== See also ==
- List of football managers with the most matches
