= 2002–03 La Liga =

72nd season of La Liga

La Liga
- Season: 2002–03
- Dates: 31 August 2002 – 22 June 2003
- Champions: Real Madrid; 29th title
- Relegated: Recreativo Huelva; Alavés; Rayo Vallecano
- Champions League: Real Madrid; Real Sociedad; Deportivo La Coruña; Celta Vigo
- UEFA Cup: Valencia; Barcelona; Mallorca (as Copa del Rey winners)
- Intertoto Cup: Villarreal; Racing Santander
- Matches: 380
- Goals: 1,016 (2.67 per match)
- Top goalscorer: Roy Makaay (29 goals)
- Biggest home win: Deportivo La Coruña 6–0 Alavés (22 February 2003)
- Biggest away win: Mallorca 1–5 Real Madrid (8 December 2002); Alavés 1–5 Real Madrid (1 March 2003); Real Madrid 1–5 Mallorca (3 May 2003); Osasuna 1–5 Athletic Bilbao (4 May 2003); Mallorca 0–4 Atlético Madrid (22 September 2002); Mallorca 0–4 Barcelona (21 December 2002); Rayo Vallecano 0–4 Valencia (23 February 2003); Atlético Madrid 0–4 Real Madrid (15 June 2003)
- Highest scoring: Barcelona 6–1 Alavés (26 October 2002); Barcelona 6–1 Racing Santander (23 March 2003); Real Madrid 5–2 Alavés (6 October 2002); Racing Santander 5–2 Espanyol (1 June 2003); Villarreal 4–3 Atlético Madrid (5 January 2003); Málaga 3–4 Espanyol (27 October 2002); Racing Santander 3–4 Athletic Bilbao (4 January 2003)

The 2002–03 La Liga season was the 72nd since its establishment. It began on 31 August 2002, and concluded on 22 June 2003.

== Teams ==
Twenty teams competed in the league – the top seventeen teams from the previous season and the three teams promoted from the Segunda División. The promoted teams were Atlético Madrid, Racing Santander and Recreativo, returning to the top flight after an absence of two, one and twenty three years respectively. They replaced Las Palmas, Tenerife and Zaragoza after spending time in the top flight for two, one and twenty four years respectively.

▲ Promoted to 2002–03 La Liga	▼ Relegated from 2001–02 La Liga
Atlético Madrid; Racing Santander; Recreativo	Las Palmas; Tenerife; Zaragoza

Location of teams in La Liga 2002–03

Team	Stadium	Capacity
Barcelona	Camp Nou	98,772
Real Madrid	Santiago Bernabéu	80,354
Espanyol	Estadi Olímpic Lluís Companys	55,926
Atlético Madrid*	Vicente Calderón	55,005
Valencia	Mestalla	55,000
Real Betis	Manuel Ruiz de Lopera	52,132
Sevilla	Ramón Sánchez Pizjuán	45,500
Athletic Bilbao	San Mamés	39,750
Deportivo de La Coruña	Riazor	34,600
Celta de Vigo	Estadio Balaídos	32,500
Real Sociedad	Anoeta	32,200
Málaga	La Rosaleda	30,044
Valladolid	José Zorrilla	27,846
Mallorca	Son Moix	23,142
Villarreal	El Madrigal	23,000
Racing de Santander*	El Sardinero	22,400
Recreativo de Huelva*	Nuevo Colombino	19,860
Alavés	Mendizorrotza	19,840
Osasuna	El Sadar	19,553
Rayo Vallecano	Campo de Fútbol de Vallecas	14,505

(*) Promoted from Segunda División.

=== Personnel and sponsors ===
Team	Head Coach	Kit manufacturer	Shirt sponsor (front)	Shirt sponsor (back)	Shirt sponsor (sleeve)	Shorts sponsor
Alavés	(Spain) Txutxi Aranguren	Umbro	Alpine Europe (H) / Artium (A) / Rioja Alavesa (in UEFA matches)	None	alava.net, Artium	Greco Gres
Athletic Bilbao	(Germany) Jupp Heynckes	100% Athletic	None	None	None	None
Atlético Madrid	(Spain) Luis Aragonés	Nike	IDEA Electrodomésticos	None	None	None
Barcelona	(Federal Republic of Yugoslavia) Radomir Antić	Nike	None	None	None	None
Betis	(Spain) Víctor Fernández	Kappa	None	None	None	None
Celta de Vigo	(Spain) Miguel Ángel Lotina	Umbro	Citroën	None	None	None
Deportivo de La Coruña	(Spain) Javier Irureta	Joma	Fadesa	None	None	None
Espanyol	(Spain) Javier Clemente	Umbro	Vitel Mobile	None	None	None
Málaga	(Spain) Joaquín Peiró	Umbro	Unicaja / Andalucía	None	None	None
Mallorca	(Spain) Gregorio Manzano	Reial	Spanair	None	None	None
Osasuna	(Mexico) Javier Aguirre	Astore	Caja Navarra	None	None	None
Racing de Santander	(Spain) Chuchi Cos	Racing	Cantabria / Organización Impulsora de Discapacitados	None	None	None
Rayo Vallecano	(Spain) Antonio Iriondo	Joma	Rumasa	None	None	None
Real Madrid	(Spain) Vicente del Bosque	Adidas	Siemens Mobile	None	None	None
Real Sociedad	(France) Raynald Denoueix	Astore	Krafft Professional	None	None	None
Recreativo de Huelva	(Spain) Lucas Alcaraz	Kelme	Cepsa / Andalucía	None	None	None
Sevilla	(Spain) Joaquín Caparrós	Joma	Organización Impulsora de Discapacitados	Sevilla 2012	None	Sevilla 2012
Valencia	(Spain) Rafael Benítez	Nike	Terra Mítica	None	None	None
Valladolid	(Spain) José Moré Bonet	Umbro	Agroinnova / Hipotecas iBanesto / Castilla y León / Michelin / Supermercados El Árbol / Grupo Helios / Asómate a Valladolid	Indalux	Grupo Castrillo	None
Villarreal	(Spain) Benito Floro	Kelme	Terra Mítica	None	None	None

== League table ==
Pos	Team	Pld	W	D	L	GF	GA	GD	Pts	Qualification or relegation
1	Real Madrid (C)	38	22	12	4	86	42	+44	78	Qualification for the Champions League group stage
2	Real Sociedad	38	22	10	6	71	45	+26	76	Qualification for the Champions League group stage
3	Deportivo La Coruña	38	22	6	10	67	47	+20	72	Qualification for the Champions League third qualifying round
4	Celta Vigo	38	17	10	11	45	36	+9	61	Qualification for the Champions League third qualifying round
5	Valencia	38	17	9	12	56	35	+21	60	Qualification for the UEFA Cup first round
6	Barcelona	38	15	11	12	63	47	+16	56	Qualification for the UEFA Cup first round
7	Athletic Bilbao	38	15	10	13	63	61	+2	55	
8	Real Betis	38	14	12	12	56	53	+3	54	
9	Mallorca	38	14	10	14	49	56	−7	52	Qualification for the UEFA Cup first round (Note: Mallorca entered UEFA Cup as winners of 2002–03 Copa del Rey)
10	Sevilla	38	13	11	14	38	39	−1	50	
11	Osasuna	38	12	11	15	40	48	−8	47 (Note: OSA 1–0 ATM; ATM 0–1 OSA)	
12	Atlético Madrid	38	12	11	15	51	56	−5	47	
13	Málaga	38	11	13	14	44	49	−5	46 (Note: VLD 0–0 MLG; MLG 1–0 VLD)	
14	Valladolid	38	12	10	16	37	40	−3	46	
15	Villarreal	38	11	12	15	44	53	−9	45	Qualification for the Intertoto Cup third round
16	Racing Santander	38	13	5	20	54	64	−10	44	Qualification for the Intertoto Cup second round
17	Espanyol	38	10	13	15	48	54	−6	43	
18	Recreativo (R)	38	8	12	18	35	61	−26	36	Relegation to the Segunda División
19	Alavés (R)	38	8	11	19	38	68	−30	35	Relegation to the Segunda División
20	Rayo Vallecano (R)	38	7	11	20	31	62	−31	32	Relegation to the Segunda División

Source: LFP
Rules for classification: 1st points; 2nd head-to-head points; 3rd head-to-head goal difference; 4th head-to-head away goals scored; 5th goal difference; 6th number of goals scored; 7th Fair-play points
(C) Champions; (R) Relegated

== Results ==
Home \ Away	ATH	ATM	FCB	BET	CEL	ALV	RCD	ESP	MCF	MLL	OSA	RAC	RVA	RMA	RSO	REC	SFC	VCF	VLD	VIL
Athletic Bilbao		1–0	0–2	3–1	2–1	2–0	3–2	4–1	1–1	0–2	1–3	2–1	2–1	1–1	3–0	2–3	2–0	1–0	0–0	0–1
Atlético Madrid	3–3		3–0	1–0	0–1	0–1	3–1	3–3	2–1	2–1	0–1	1–2	2–0	0–4	1–2	1–1	1–1	1–1	1–0	3–2
Barcelona	2–2	2–2		4–0	2–0	6–1	2–4	2–0	2–1	1–2	2–2	6–1	3–0	0–0	2–1	3–0	0–3	2–4	1–1	1–0
Betis	1–0	2–2	3–0		2–1	2–2	0–2	1–1	3–0	0–1	2–1	4–2	0–1	1–1	3–2	1–1	0–1	2–0	2–2	2–1
Celta de Vigo	2–1	0–0	2–0	1–0		2–1	3–0	1–0	2–2	3–1	0–0	2–2	0–1	0–1	3–2	4–1	0–1	1–1	0–0	3–1
Alavés	2–4	2–0	0–0	0–1	0–0		1–2	2–1	0–1	0–0	1–1	0–1	1–1	1–5	2–2	3–0	1–0	0–0	1–1	1–0
Deportivo La Coruña	2–1	3–2	2–0	2–4	3–0	6–0		2–1	1–0	2–2	1–1	0–2	2–0	0–0	2–1	5–0	3–1	1–2	2–0	2–1
Espanyol	3–3	1–2	0–2	2–4	0–0	3–1	3–1		2–1	2–0	0–0	3–0	3–1	2–2	1–3	2–0	0–0	0–1	1–0	2–2
Málaga	3–0	3–1	0–0	0–0	1–1	0–0	0–2	3–4		1–0	1–0	2–2	2–1	2–3	0–2	4–0	3–2	2–2	1–0	1–1
Mallorca	1–1	0–4	0–4	2–1	0–2	3–1	3–0	2–0	1–0		2–0	3–3	1–1	1–5	1–3	1–1	1–3	0–2	2–1	1–1
Osasuna	1–5	1–0	2–2	2–1	0–2	4–2	1–2	1–0	0–1	0–0		3–1	0–1	1–0	2–3	0–1	2–1	1–0	1–1	0–1
Racing Santander	3–4	0–2	1–1	0–1	3–0	2–0	1–2	5–2	1–0	1–2	2–3		2–0	2–0	1–2	1–0	1–0	2–1	0–1	1–1
Rayo Vallecano	1–1	0–0	1–0	1–1	1–0	2–2	1–2	0–3	2–1	1–2	0–0	3–1		2–3	0–0	0–0	0–1	0–4	0–1	2–2
Real Madrid	3–1	2–2	1–1	4–1	1–1	5–2	2–0	2–0	5–1	1–5	4–1	4–1	3–1		0–0	4–2	3–0	4–1	3–1	1–1
Real Sociedad	4–2	3–0	2–1	3–3	1–0	3–1	1–1	0–0	2–2	2–1	2–0	2–1	5–0	4–2		1–0	1–0	1–1	2–1	2–2
Recreativo	1–2	3–0	1–3	1–1	0–3	1–0	1–1	0–0	2–3	1–1	1–1	2–1	2–1	0–0	1–3		0–0	1–1	1–3	5–0
Sevilla	1–1	1–1	0–0	1–1	0–1	3–2	1–1	1–0	0–0	3–0	2–0	1–0	3–3	1–3	0–1	1–0		0–3	2–1	3–1
Valencia	5–1	0–1	1–3	1–1	0–1	3–0	0–1	1–1	2–0	1–0	1–0	2–0	3–0	1–2	2–2	3–0	1–0		2–0	1–2
Valladolid	2–0	3–1	2–1	3–0	0–2	1–3	0–1	1–1	0–0	1–3	0–2	2–1	2–0	1–1	3–0	0–1	0–0	1–0		1–0
Villarreal	1–1	4–3	2–0	1–4	5–0	0–1	3–1	0–0	0–0	1–1	2–2	0–3	2–1	0–1	0–1	1–0	1–0	0–2	1–0	

Source: LFP (in Spanish)
Legend: Blue = home team win; Yellow = draw; Red = away team win.

== Overall ==
- Most wins - Real Madrid, Real Sociedad, and Deportivo de La Coruña (22)
- Fewest wins - Rayo Vallecano (7)
- Most draws - Málaga CF and Espanyol (13)
- Fewest draws - Racing Santander (5)
- Most losses - Racing Santander and Rayo Vallecano (20)
- Fewest losses - Real Madrid (4)
- Most goals scored - Real Madrid (86)
- Fewest goals scored - Rayo Vallecano (31)
- Most goals conceded - Deportivo Alavés (68)
- Fewest goals conceded - Valencia (35)

== Awards ==
=== Annual awards ===
Individual awards
Award	Winner	Club
Pichichi Trophy	(Netherlands) Roy Makaay	Deportivo La Coruña
Zamora Trophy	(Argentina) Pablo Cavallero	Celta Vigo
Best Player	(Spain) Xabi Alonso	Real Sociedad
Best Foreign Player	(Turkey) Nihat Kahveci	Real Sociedad
Best Newcomer	(Brazil) Thiago Motta	Barcelona
Best Manager	(France) Raynald Denoueix	Real Sociedad

=== Team of the Season ===

El País Team of the Season

El País Team of the Season
Goalkeeper	(Netherlands) Sander Westerveld (Real Sociedad)			
Defenders	(Spain) Carles Puyol (Barcelona)	(Argentina) Roberto Ayala (Valencia)	(Spain) Iván Helguera (Real Madrid)	(Spain) Agustín Aranzábal (Real Sociedad)
Midfielders	(Spain) Joseba Etxeberria (Athletic Bilbao)	(Spain) Xabi Alonso (Real Sociedad)	(France) Zinedine Zidane (Real Madrid)	(Spain) Javier de Pedro (Real Sociedad)
Forwards	(Turkey) Nihat Kahveci (Real Sociedad)		(Brazil) Ronaldo (Real Madrid)	

=== Pichichi Trophy ===
The Pichichi Trophy is awarded to the player who scores the most goals in a season.

Rank	Player	Club	Goals
1	(Netherlands) Roy Makaay	Deportivo La Coruña	29
2	(Turkey) Nihat Kahveci	Real Sociedad	23
2	(Brazil) Ronaldo	Real Madrid	23
4	(Federal Republic of Yugoslavia) Darko Kovačević	Real Sociedad	20
5	(Netherlands) Patrick Kluivert	Barcelona	16
5	(Spain) Raúl	Real Madrid	16
7	(Spain) Fernando	Real Betis	15
8	(Cameroon) Samuel Eto'o	Mallorca	14

=== Fair Play award ===
Real Madrid was the winner of the Fair-play award, with 76 points; second was Real Sociedad; and third was Deportivo La Coruña.

=== Pedro Zaballa award ===
Real Sociedad supporters

=== Hat-tricks ===
Player	Club	Against	Result	Date
(Netherlands) Kiki Musampa	Málaga	Recreativo Huelva	3–2 (A)	1 September 2002
(Spain) Julio Álvarez	Rayo Vallecano	Racing Santander	3–1 (H)	22 September 2002
(Argentina) Pablo Aimar	Valencia	Athletic Bilbao	5–1 (H)	26 October 2002
(Netherlands) Patrick Kluivert	Barcelona	Alavés	6–1 (H)	26 October 2002
(Uruguay) Walter Pandiani	Mallorca	Valladolid	3–1 (A)	2 November 2002
(Spain) José Mari	Atlético Madrid	Athletic Bilbao	3–3 (H)	10 November 2002
(Spain) Ismael Urzaiz	Athletic Bilbao	Atlético Madrid	3–3 (A)	10 November 2002
(Netherlands) Patrick Kluivert	Barcelona	Mallorca	4–0 (A)	21 December 2002
(Argentina) Javier Saviola	Barcelona	Real Betis	4–0 (H)	22 February 2003
(Spain) Diego Tristán	Deportivo La Coruña	Alavés	6–0 (H)	22 February 2003
(Brazil) Ronaldo	Real Madrid	Alavés	5–1 (A)	1 March 2003
(Netherlands) Roy Makaay	Deportivo La Coruña	Recreativo Huelva	5–0 (H)	4 May 2003

== Attendances ==
#	Club	Avg. attendance	% change	Highest
1	Real Madrid	69,232	8.8%	78,000
2	FC Barcelona	66,058	21.9%	98,152
3	Atlético de Madrid	46,250	10.4%	58,000
4	Valencia CF	45,558	0.8%	52,000
5	Real Betis	35,067	-4.8%	52,000
6	Sevilla FC	34,758	4.8%	60,000
7	Athletic Club	34,151	2.8%	40,465
8	Deportivo de La Coruña	28,079	-4.4%	34,600
9	Real Sociedad	27,743	11.5%	33,000
10	RCD Espanyol	23,587	18.0%	51,100
11	Celta de Vigo	20,263	-6.0%	35,000
12	Málaga CF	18,158	13.5%	28,000
13	Recreativo de Huelva	17,605	63.3%	20,000
14	Villarreal CF	17,158	6.3%	23,000
15	RCD Mallorca	16,921	1.2%	23,100
16	Racing de Santander	15,832	49.2%	22,000
17	CA Osasuna	15,464	-8.3%	18,917
18	Deportivo Alavés	14,516	5.6%	19,457
19	Real Valladolid	12,824	-2.2%	21,000
20	Rayo Vallecano	12,637	14.2%	16,500

== See also ==
- 2002–03 Segunda División
- 2002–03 Copa del Rey
