= 2001–02 Segunda División =

71st season of the second-tier football league in Spain

Segunda División
- Season: 2001-02
- Champions: Atlético Madrid
- Promoted: Atlético Madrid; Racing de Santander; Recreativo de Huelva
- Relegated: Burgos CF; Gimnàstic de Tarragona; CF Extremadura; Real Jaén
- Matches: 462
- Goals: 996 (2.16 per match)
- Top goalscorer: (Uruguay) Diego Alonso

The 2001–02 Segunda División season saw 22 teams participate in the second flight Spanish league. The teams that promoted to La Liga were Atlético Madrid, Racing de Santander and Recreativo de Huelva. The teams that relegated to Segunda División B were Burgos CF, Gimnàstic de Tarragona, CF Extremadura and Real Jaén.

== Teams ==
Location of teams in Segunda División 2001-02

Team	Home city	Stadium	Capacity
Albacete	Albacete	Carlos Belmonte	18,000
Atlético de Madrid	Madrid	Vicente Calderón	54,907
Badajoz	Badajoz	Nuevo Vivero	15,198
Burgos	Burgos	El Plantío	12,642
Córdoba	Córdoba	Nuevo Arcángel	21,822
Eibar	Eibar	Ipurua	5,000
Elche	Elche	Martínez Valero	36,017
Extremadura	Almendralejo	Francisco de la Hera	11,580
Gimnàstic de Tarragona	Tarragona	Nou Estadi	14,543
Leganés	Leganés	Butarque	8,138
Levante	Valencia	Ciutat de València	26,354
Real Jaén	Jaén	Nuevo La Victoria	12,569
Real Murcia	Murcia	La Condomina	16,000
Numancia	Soria	Los Pajaritos	8,261
Real Oviedo	Oviedo	Carlos Tartiere	30,500
Polideportivo Ejido	El Ejido	Santo Domingo	7,870
Racing Ferrol	Ferrol	A Malata	12,024
Racing de Santander	Santander	El Sardinero	30,000
Recreativo de Huelva	Huelva	Nuevo Colombino	21,670
Salamanca	Villares de la Reina	Helmántico	17,341
Sporting de Gijón	Gijón	El Molinón	25,885
Xerez	Jerez de la Frontera	Chapín	20,523

1. Racing Ferrol played some of their matches at Lugo's Anxo Carro Stadium.
2. Xerez played some of their matches at El Palmar and Juventud.
3. Polideportivo Ejdio played the match against Numancia at Almeria's Juan Rojas Stadium on 27 October 2001.
4. Recreativo de Huelva played their first six home matches at the Estadio Colombino before permanently moving to the Estadio Nuevo Colombino.

=== Teams by Autonomous Community ===
	Autonomous community	Number of teams	Teams
1	Andalusia	5	Córdoba, Poli Ejido, Real Jaén, Recreativo, Xerez
2	Castile and León	3	Burgos, Numancia, Salamanca
3	Asturias	2	Oviedo, Sporting
3	Extremadura	2	Badajoz, Extremadura
3	Madrid	2	Atlético Madrid, Leganés
3	Valencia	2	Elche, Levante
7	Basque Country	1	Eibar
7	Cantabria	1	Racing de Santander
7	Castile-La Mancha	1	Albacete
7	Catalonia	1	Gimnàstic
7	Galicia	1	Racing de Ferrol
7	Murcia	1	Murcia

== Final table ==
Pos	Team	Pld	W	D	L	GF	GA	GD	Pts	Promotion or relegation
1	Atlético Madrid (C, P)	42	23	10	9	68	44	+24	79	Promotion to La Liga
2	Racing Santander (P)	42	19	14	9	58	37	+21	71	Promotion to La Liga
3	Recreativo (P)	42	18	15	9	47	35	+12	69	Promotion to La Liga
4	Xerez	42	19	9	14	43	42	+1	66	
5	Elche	42	17	14	11	52	39	+13	65	
6	Sporting Gijón	42	17	13	12	57	47	+10	64	
7	Oviedo	42	13	19	10	41	40	+1	58 (Note: OVI 1–0 EIB; EIB 1–1 OVI)	
8	Eibar	42	14	16	12	41	27	+14	58	
9	Racing Ferrol	42	16	8	18	58	60	−2	56 (Note: ALB 2–1 RFE; RFE 2–0 ALB)	
10	Albacete	42	15	11	16	43	42	+1	56	
11	Salamanca	42	13	15	14	52	53	−1	54	
12	Badajoz	42	15	8	19	43	52	−9	53 (Note: BAD: 6 pts; CÓR: 5 pts → LEG 1–1 CÓR; LEG: 5 pts → CÓR 1–1 LEG)	
13	Córdoba	42	14	11	17	46	51	−5	53	
14	Leganés	42	13	14	15	40	46	−6	53	
15	Murcia	42	12	16	14	37	38	−1	52 (Note: MUR 1–2 BUR; BUR 0–1 MUR)	
16	Burgos (Note: Burgos was relegated to Segunda División B because it did not become a Sociedad Anónima Deportiva. Levante was readmitted into Segunda División.) (R)	42	12	16	14	31	37	−6	52	Relegation to Segunda División B
17	Numancia	42	13	12	17	45	53	−8	51	
18	Poli Ejido	42	12	14	16	41	48	−7	50 (Note: LEV 0–0 EJI; EJI 1–0 LEV)	
19	Levante	42	12	14	16	41	54	−13	50	Spared from relegation
20	Gimnàstic (R)	42	12	13	17	45	49	−4	49	Relegation to Segunda División B
21	Extremadura (R)	42	10	13	19	37	50	−13	43	Relegation to Segunda División B
22	Real Jaén (R)	42	11	9	22	30	52	−22	42	Relegation to Segunda División B

Source: LFP - Liga Adelante
Rules for classification: 1st points; 2nd head-to-head points; 3rd head-to-head goal difference; 4th head-to-head goals scored; 5th goal difference; 6th number of goals scored; 7th Fair-play points
(C) Champions; (P) Promoted; (R) Relegated

== Results ==
Home \ Away	ALB	ATM	BAD	BUR	CÓR	EIB	ELC	EXT	GIM	LEG	LEV	RJA	MUR	NUM	OVI	EJI	RFE	RAC	REC	SAL	SPG	XER
Albacete	—	2–1	2–0	2–1	0–0	0–0	0–2	1–1	1–0	1–2	3–0	4–0	1–0	3–1	1–1	2–1	2–1	0–1	0–0	0–1	1–2	3–0
Atlético	3–2	—	1–0	1–1	0–0	1–0	4–0	3–2	3–3	0–2	2–1	2–0	4–2	2–2	0–0	1–0	1–1	2–0	1–1	2–1	0–1	0–0
Badajoz	2–3	0–1	—	2–3	0–1	0–1	1–3	2–2	2–1	3–2	2–2	1–0	1–1	0–0	1–0	0–1	2–1	3–2	1–0	2–2	1–2	1–0
Burgos	0–0	0–4	0–1	—	0–1	0–0	0–0	1–0	1–0	0–0	0–1	0–0	0–1	1–1	1–1	2–0	2–4	0–0	1–3	0–0	0–0	3–1
Córdoba	3–1	0–2	1–2	1–1	—	0–2	3–0	2–0	1–1	1–1	3–1	2–1	2–1	1–0	0–1	0–1	1–1	0–4	0–0	4–2	1–2	0–0
Eibar	1–0	0–3	0–1	1–0	2–1	—	3–1	0–0	3–1	0–0	7–0	1–1	0–1	2–0	1–1	4–2	2–0	2–2	1–1	0–1	2–0	2–0
Elche	1–0	5–1	1–0	2–0	2–3	0–0	—	0–0	1–0	1–0	2–2	1–3	1–1	1–1	2–0	2–0	0–0	1–1	1–1	4–1	1–0	4–0
Extremadura	0–0	2–0	0–4	2–0	3–2	0–1	1–0	—	1–0	2–1	1–0	5–0	0–2	0–2	1–1	1–1	1–2	2–0	0–3	0–1	1–2	0–1
Gimnàstic	0–1	1–2	1–1	0–0	1–0	1–0	1–2	3–1	—	0–1	1–0	0–2	1–1	3–1	1–0	2–2	2–0	0–0	1–2	2–2	1–1	2–1
Leganés	1–2	0–3	1–0	0–0	1–1	1–0	0–0	2–0	2–1	—	2–1	2–0	0–0	0–1	1–3	2–0	2–2	1–4	0–0	3–1	0–2	0–1
Levante	1–1	2–4	0–1	0–0	3–1	0–0	1–1	1–0	2–2	1–2	—	0–1	0–0	0–1	0–0	0–0	3–1	1–1	0–1	2–2	4–3	0–1
Real Jaén	1–0	1–0	0–1	0–0	1–2	0–0	0–1	1–0	0–1	1–0	0–1	—	0–0	1–2	1–3	3–1	1–4	0–0	1–1	0–1	3–3	0–2
Murcia	0–0	3–1	1–1	1–2	1–0	0–0	2–1	2–1	0–2	0–0	0–1	3–0	—	1–2	1–1	0–1	1–2	0–0	2–0	3–3	3–1	0–0
Numancia	1–0	1–2	1–2	1–5	0–2	1–1	1–1	0–0	0–0	1–0	1–2	1–0	1–0	—	1–2	3–0	4–0	0–1	0–0	2–2	3–1	1–1
Oviedo	0–0	2–3	1–0	2–0	3–1	1–0	3–6	1–1	0–2	0–0	1–1	0–0	2–0	0–0	—	1–1	2–1	0–0	1–1	0–0	0–2	1–0
Poli Ejido	2–0	1–2	1–0	0–1	1–1	0–0	0–0	0–0	1–0	1–1	1–0	1–0	0–0	3–4	3–0	—	3–0	1–0	0–0	2–5	2–2	1–1
Racing Ferrol	2–0	1–1	1–0	3–0	1–3	1–1	1–0	2–0	1–2	3–0	1–2	0–1	2–0	2–1	0–2	2–1	—	2–0	1–1	3–1	1–2	2–2
Racing San.	3–1	1–0	3–0	0–2	2–0	1–1	0–0	1–1	3–0	3–1	4–2	2–0	1–0	4–0	1–1	2–1	0–1	—	1–5	2–0	2–1	1–0
Recreativo	3–1	1–3	2–0	0–1	2–1	1–0	1–0	3–2	1–0	1–2	0–0	0–3	0–1	1–0	0–2	1–0	1–0	1–1	—	2–0	0–0	2–1
Salamanca	2–0	0–0	2–2	0–1	0–0	1–0	1–0	0–0	3–3	1–0	0–1	0–1	0–0	2–0	3–0	0–2	3–1	1–2	2–3	—	1–2	1–1
Sporting	0–0	2–1	3–0	0–1	3–0	1–0	0–1	1–1	1–1	1–1	0–1	3–2	0–1	2–1	0–0	1–1	5–3	1–1	3–1	1–1	—	0–1
Xerez	1–2	0–1	2–0	1–0	1–0	1–0	2–0	1–2	2–1	3–3	0–1	1–0	3–1	2–1	2–1	2–1	2–1	2–1	0–0	0–2	1–0	—

Source: BDFutbol
Legend: Blue = home team win; Yellow = draw; Red = away team win.
