= 2014–15 Atlético Madrid season =

84th season in existence of Atlético Madrid

Atlético Madrid
2014–15 season
- President: Enrique Cerezo
- Head coach: Diego Simeone
- Stadium: Vicente Calderón
- La Liga: 3rd
- Copa del Rey: Quarter-finals
- Supercopa de España: Winners
- UEFA Champions League: Quarter-finals
- Top goalscorer: League: Antoine Griezmann (22); All: Antoine Griezmann (25)
- Highest home attendance: 54,900 vs Real Madrid (7 February 2015)
- Lowest home attendance: 47,000 vs Rayo Vallecano (25 August 2014)
- Average home league attendance: 49,000
Home colours	Away colours	Third colours

The 2014–15 season was Atlético Madrid's 84th season in existence and the club's 78th season in La Liga. Atlético competed in La Liga, Copa del Rey and UEFA Champions League.

== Kits ==
Supplier: Nike / Main Sponsor: Azerbaijan (also 2015 European Games) / Back Sponsor: Plus500 / Sleeve Sponsor: Huawei

Home	Home alt.	Away	Third	Third alt.	Third alt. 2	Goalkeeper 1	Goalkeeper 2	Goalkeeper 3

== Players ==
N	Pos.	Nat.	Name	Age	EU	Since	App	Goals	Ends	Transfer fee	Notes
1	GK	(Spain)	Miguel Ángel Moyá	31	EU	2014	36	0	2017	€3M	
2	DF	(Uruguay)	Diego Godín	29	Non-EU	2010	212	15	2019	€8M	
3	DF	(Brazil)	Guilherme Siqueira	29	Non-EU	2014	37	1	2018	€10M	
4	MF	(Spain)	Mario Suárez	28	EU	2005–2008; 2010	185	5	2017	YS	
5	MF	(Portugal)	Tiago	34	EU	2009	194	17	2016	Free	
6	MF	(Spain)	Koke	23	EU	2009	218	18	2019	YS	
7	FW	(France)	Antoine Griezmann	24	EU	2014	54	32	2020	€30M	
8	MF	(Spain)	Raúl García	28	EU	2007	328	46	2018	€13M	
9	FW	(Croatia)	Mario Mandžukić	29	EU	2014	43	20	2018	€22M	
10	MF	(Turkey)	Arda Turan	28	Non-EU	2011	178	22	2018	€12M	
11	FW	(Mexico)	Raúl Jiménez	24	Non-EU	2016	28	1	2019	€10.5M	
13	GK	(Slovenia)	Jan Oblak	22	EU	2014	21	0	2020	€16M	
14	MF	(Spain)	Gabi (captain)	31	EU	2004–2007; 2011	265	8	2017	€3M	
15	DF	(Argentina)	Cristian Ansaldi (on loan from Zenit Saint Petersburg)	28	Non-EU	2014	11	0	2015	Free	
17	MF	(Spain)	Saúl	20	EU	2012	47	4	2020	YS	
18	DF	(Spain)	Jesús Gámez	30	EU	2014	21	0	2017	€2.5M	
19	FW	(Spain)	Fernando Torres (on loan from Milan)	31	EU	2001–2007; 2015	270	97	2019	Free	
20	DF	(Spain)	Juanfran	30	EU	2011	211	3	2018	€4.25M	
22	MF	(Spain)	Cani (on loan from Villarreal)	33	EU	2014	6	0	2015	Free	
23	DF	(Brazil)	Miranda	30	Non-EU	2011	177	13	2016	Free	
24	DF	(Uruguay)	José Giménez	20	Non-EU	2013	28	2	2018	€0.9M	
26	FW	(Argentina)	Ángel Correa	20	Non-EU	2014	0	0	2019	€7.5M	

- Last updated: 25 May 2015
- Source: Atlético Madrid
- Ordered by squad number.

== Transfers ==
=== In ===
No.	Pos.	Nat.	Name	Age	EU	Moving from	Type	Transfer window	Ends	Transfer fee	Source
	MF	(France)	Josuha Guilavogui	23	EU	(France) Saint-Étienne	End of loan	Summer		Free	
17	MF	(Spain)	Saúl	19	EU	Rayo Vallecano	End of loan	Summer		Free	
	CF	(Spain)	Borja Bastón	22	EU	Deportivo La Coruña	End of loan	Summer		Free	
	CM	(Spain)	Rubén Pérez	26	EU	Elche	End of loan	Summer		Free	
	GK	(Spain)	Sergio Asenjo	26	EU	Villarreal	End of loan	Summer		Free	
	GK	(Spain)	Roberto	29	EU	(Greece) Olympiacos	End of loan	Summer		Free	
	MF	(Spain)	Óliver Torres	20	EU	Villarreal	End of loan	Summer		Free	
	ST	(Brazil)	Léo Baptistão	21	Non-EU	Real Betis	End of loan	Summer		Free	
15	DF	(Argentina)	Cristian Ansaldi	27	Non-EU	(Russia) Zenit Saint Petersburg	Loan	Summer	2015	€1M	
	GK	(Portugal)	André Moreira	19	EU	(Portugal) Ribeirão	Transfer	Summer	2020	€0.35M	
	CB	(Uruguay)	Emiliano Velázquez	21	Non-EU	(Uruguay) Danubio	Transfer	Summer	2019	€1.1M	
18	DF	(Spain)	Jesús Gámez	29	EU	Málaga	Transfer	Summer	2015	€2.5M	
1	GK	(Spain)	Miguel Ángel Moyà	30	EU	Getafe	Transfer	Summer	2017	€3M	
3	DF	(Brazil)	Guilherme Siqueira	28	Non-EU	Granada	Transfer	Summer	2018	€10M	
11	FW	(Mexico)	Raúl Jiménez	23	Non-EU	(Mexico) América	Transfer	Summer	2020	€10.5M	Atlético.com
13	GK	(Slovenia)	Jan Oblak	21	EU	(Portugal) Benfica	Transfer	Summer	2020	€16M	
	FW	(Italy)	Alessio Cerci	27	EU	(Italy) Torino	Transfer	Summer	2017	€16M	
9	ST	(Croatia)	Mario Mandžukić	28	EU	(Germany) Bayern Munich	Transfer	Summer	2018	€22M	
7	FW	(France)	Antoine Griezmann	23	EU	Real Sociedad	Transfer	Summer	2020	€30M	
	LW	(Uruguay)	Cristian Rodríguez	29	Non-EU	(Italy) Parma	End of loan	Winter		Free	
	CM	(Spain)	Rubén Pérez	26	EU	(Italy) Torino	End of loan	Winter		Free	
19	FW	(Spain)	Fernando Torres	30	EU	(Italy) Milan	Loan	Winter	2016	Free	
22	LW	(Spain)	Cani	33	EU	Villarreal	Loan	Winter	2015	Free	
26	FW	(Argentina)	Ángel Correa	19	Non-EU	(Argentina) San Lorenzo	Transfer	Winter	2019	€7.5M	

=== Out ===
No.	Pos.	Nat.	Name	Age	EU	Moving to	Type	Transfer window	Transfer fee	Source
	GK	(Spain)	Daniel Aranzubia	34	EU	End of career	Retired	Summer	Free	
	ST	(Spain)	David Villa	32	EU	(United States) New York City FC	End of contract	Summer	Free	
	MF	(Argentina)	José Sosa	29	Non-EU	(Ukraine) Metalist Kharkiv	End of Loan	Summer	Free	
	GK	(Belgium)	Thibaut Courtois	22	EU	(England) Chelsea	End of Loan	Summer	Free	
	MF	(Brazil)	Diego	29	Non-EU	(Turkey) Fenerbahçe	Transfer	Summer	Free	
	GK	(Spain)	Sergio Asenjo	25	EU	Villarreal	Transfer	Summer	€5M	
	GK	(Spain)	Roberto	29	EU	(Greece) Olympiacos	Transfer	Summer	€6M	
	ST	(Spain)	Adrián López	26	EU	(Portugal) Porto	Transfer	Summer	€11M	
	DF	(Brazil)	Filipe Luís	28	EU	(England) Chelsea	Transfer	Summer	€20M	
	ST	(Spain)	Diego Costa	25	EU	(England) Chelsea	Transfer	Summer	€38M	
	CF	(Spain)	Borja Baston	22	EU	Zaragoza	Loan	Summer	Free	
	CF	(Brazil)	Léo Baptistão	22	EU	Rayo Vallecano	Loan	Summer	Free	
	CB	(Uruguay)	Emiliano Velázquez	21	EU	Getafe	Loan	Summer	Free	
	LB	(Argentina)	Emiliano Insúa	26	Non-EU	Rayo Vallecano	Loan	Summer	Free	
	CB	(Belgium)	Toby Alderweireld	26	EU	(England) Southampton	Loan	Summer	Free	
	MF	(Spain)	Óliver Torres	19	EU	(Portugal) Porto	Loan	Summer	Free	
	MF	(Spain)	Rubén Pérez	25	EU	(Italy) Torino	Loan	Summer	€0.5M	
	RB	(Spain)	Javier Manquillo	20	EU	(England) Liverpool	Loan	Summer	€2M	
	MF	(France)	Josuha Guilavogui	23	EU	(Germany) VfL Wolfsburg	Loan	Summer	€6.8M	
	MF	(Italy)	Alessio Cerci	26	EU	(Italy) Milan	Loan	Winter	Free	
	LW	(Uruguay)	Cristian Rodríguez	29	Non-EU	(Brazil) Grêmio	Loan	Winter	Free	

== Technical staff ==
Position	Staff
Manager	(Argentina) Diego Simeone
Assistant coach	(Argentina) Germán Burgos
Assistant coach	(Spain) Juan Vizcaíno
Goalkeeper coach	(Argentina) Pablo Vercellone
Fitness coach	(Uruguay) Oscar Ortega
Fitness coach	(Spain) Carlos Menéndez
Fitness coach	(Spain) Iván Rafael Díaz Infante
Head of Medical Department	(Spain) José María Villalón
Club doctor	(Spain) Gorka de Abajo
Physiotherapist	(Spain) Jesús Vázquez
Physiotherapist	(Spain) Esteban Arévalo
Physiotherapist	(Spain) David Loras
Physiotherapist	(Spain) Felipe Iglesias Arroyo
Rehabilitation Physio	(Spain) Daniel Castro

== Pre-season and friendlies ==
Win Draw Loss

27 July 2014 1	Atlético Madrid	1–0	Numancia	Burgo de Osma, Spain
19:00 UTC+02:00	Hernández 44'	Report		Stadium: Estadio El Plantío; Referee: José María Palacios Aragonés

28 July 2014 2	San Jose Earthquakes	0–0 (3–4 p)	Atlético Madrid	San Francisco, United States
17:00 UTC−06:00		Report		Stadium: Candlestick Park; Attendance: 16,000; Referee: Ramón Hernández
	Penalties
	Stephenson (penalty missed); Cronin (penalty scored); Schuler (penalty missed); Francis (penalty scored); Barklage (penalty scored)		(penalty scored) Siqueira; (penalty scored) Gabi; (penalty missed) Miranda; (penalty scored) Suárez; (penalty scored) Saúl

31 July 2014 3	América	0–0 (3–2 p)	Atlético Madrid	Mexico City, Mexico
16:00 UTC−06:00		Report		Stadium: Estadio Azteca; Attendance: 40,000; Referee: Roberto García Orozco
	Penalties
	R. Jiménez (penalty scored); Zúñiga (penalty scored); Velasco (penalty missed); Burón (penalty missed); H. González (penalty scored)		(penalty scored) Gabi; (penalty missed) Siqueira; (penalty missed) Koke; (penalty missed) Suárez; (penalty scored) Miranda

6 August 2014 4	Galatasaray	0–0	Atlético Madrid	İzmir, Turkey
20:00 UTC+02:00		Report		Stadium: İzmir Atatürk Stadium; Referee: Ijgur Erdogan

10 August 2014 5	VfL Wolfsburg	1–5	Atlético Madrid	Wolfsburg, Germany
18:00 UTC+02:00	Naldo 67'	Report	García 13', 54'; Mandžukić 62'; Koke 68'; Hernández 81'	Stadium: Volkswagen Arena; Attendance: 18,000

15 August 2014 6	Cádiz	0–1	Atlético Madrid	Cádiz, Spain
18:30 UTC+02:00		Report	García 59'	Stadium: Estadio Ramón de Carranza; Referee: Antonio Santos Pergaña

16 August 2014 7	Atlético Madrid	2–0	Sampdoria	Cádiz, Spain
22:00 UTC+02:00	Saúl 30'; Giménez 70'	Report		Stadium: Estadio Ramón de Carranza; Referee: Jesús Gil Manzano

== Competitions ==
=== Supercopa de España ===
Win Draw Loss

19 August 2014 First leg	Real Madrid	1–1	Atlético Madrid	Madrid
23:00 CEST (UTC+02:00)	Alonso (yellow card) 38'; Ramos (yellow card) 61'; Rodríguez 81'	Report	Koke (yellow card) 5'; Siqueira (yellow card) 13'; Suárez (yellow card) 58'; Mandžukić (yellow card) 61'; García (yellow card) 69', (goal) 88'	Stadium: Santiago Bernabéu; Attendance: 75,897; Referee: Javier Estrada Fernández (Catalonia)

22 August 2014 Second leg	Atlético Madrid	1–0 (2–1 agg.)	Real Madrid	Madrid
22:30 CEST (UTC+02:00)	Mandžukić 2'; Tiago (yellow card) 18'; Koke (yellow card) 50'; Griezmann (yellow card) 68'; García (yellow card) 74'	Report	Modrić (yellow card) 48' (yellow-red card) 90+1'; Alonso (yellow card) 52'; Isco (yellow card) 78'; Ramos (yellow card) 89'; Ronaldo (yellow card) 90+4'	Stadium: Vicente Calderón; Attendance: 53,800; Referee: David Fernández Borbalán (Andalusia)

=== La Liga ===
==== League table ====
Pos	Team	Pld	W	D	L	GF	GA	GD	Pts	Qualification or relegation
1	Barcelona (C)	38	30	4	4	110	21	+89	94	Qualification for the Champions League group stage
2	Real Madrid	38	30	2	6	118	38	+80	92	Qualification for the Champions League group stage
3	Atlético Madrid	38	23	9	6	67	29	+38	78	Qualification for the Champions League group stage
4	Valencia	38	22	11	5	70	32	+38	77	Qualification for the Champions League play-off round
5	Sevilla	38	23	7	8	71	45	+26	76	Qualification for the Champions League group stage (Note: Sevilla qualified for the Champions League group stage by winning the 2014–15 UEFA Europa League. As a result, the fifth-placed spot for the Europa League group stage they earned was vacated without replacement as per UEFA regulations.)

Source: La Liga
Rules for classification: 1) points; 2) head-to-head points; 3) head-to-head goal difference; 4) goal difference; 5) number of goals scored; 6) fair-play points; 7) playoff match
(C) Champions

==== Results by round ====
Round	1	2	3	4	5	6	7	8	9	10	11	12	13	14	15	16	17	18	19	20	21	22	23	24	25	26	27	28	29	30	31	32	33	34	35	36	37	38
Ground	A	H	A	H	A	H	A	H	A	H	A	H	H	A	H	A	H	A	H	H	A	H	A	H	A	H	A	H	A	H	A	A	H	A	H	A	H	A
Result	D	W	W	D	W	W	L	W	W	W	L	W	W	W	L	W	W	L	W	W	W	W	L	W	D	D	D	W	W	W	D	W	W	W	D	D	L	D
Position	12	6	2	3	3	3	4	5	5	3	4	3	3	3	3	3	3	3	3	3	3	3	3	3	3	3	4	4	3	3	3	3	3	3	3	3	3	3

Updated to match(es) played on 25 May 2015. Source: Competitive matches
A = Away; H = Home; W = Win; D = Draw; L = Loss

==== Matches ====
Win Draw Loss

25 August 2014 1	Rayo Vallecano	0–0	Atlético Madrid	Madrid
22:00 CEST (UTC+02:00)	Baena (yellow card) 33'; Ba (yellow card) 63'	Report	Suárez (yellow card) 83'; Juanfran (yellow card) 90+2'	Stadium: Campo de Vallecas; Attendance: 11,070; Referee: Carlos Clos Gómez (Aragon)

30 August 2014 2	Atlético Madrid	2–1	Eibar	Madrid
21:00 CEST (UTC+02:00)	Miranda 11'; Mandžukić 25'; Suárez (yellow card) 54'; Koke (yellow card) 64'; Gabi (yellow card) 74'	Report	Minero 34'	Stadium: Vicente Calderón; Attendance: 48,000; Referee: Eduardo Prieto Iglesias (Navarre)

13 September 2014 3	Real Madrid	1–2	Atlético Madrid	Madrid
20:00 CEST (UTC+02:00)	Rodríguez (yellow card) 19'; Ronaldo 26' (pen.); Arbeloa (yellow card) 63'; Hernández (yellow card) 67'; Modrić (yellow card) 85'	Report	Tiago 10'; Godín (yellow card) 22'; Siqueira (yellow card) 25'; Mandžukić (yellow card) 41'; Gabi (yellow card) 54'; Turan 76'; Miranda (yellow card) 86'; Suárez (yellow card) 89'; Koke (yellow card) 90+2'	Stadium: Santiago Bernabéu; Attendance: 85,253; Referee: Antonio Mateu Lahoz (Valencian Community)

20 September 2014 4	Atlético Madrid	2–2	Celta Vigo	Madrid
20:00 CEST (UTC+02:00)	Miranda 31', (yellow card) 52'; Godín 41'	Report	Hernández 19'; Cabral (yellow card) 35'; Orellana (yellow card) 45+1'; Nolito 53' (pen.); Gómez (yellow card) 85'	Stadium: Vicente Calderón; Attendance: 47,000; Referee: Juan Martínez Munuera (Valencian Community)

24 September 2014 5	Almería	0–1	Atlético Madrid	Almería
20:00 CEST (UTC+02:00)	Mauro (yellow card) 65'; Zongo (yellow card) 88'; Soriano (yellow card) 89'	Report	Miranda 60'	Stadium: Juegos Mediterráneos; Attendance: 11,863; Referee: Jesús Gil Manzano (Extremadura)

27 September 2014 6	Atlético Madrid	4–0	Sevilla	Madrid
20:00 CEST (UTC+02:00)	Koke 19', (yellow card) 60'; Mandžukić (yellow card) 27'; Saúl 42'; Godín (yellow card) 61'; García 83' (pen.), (yellow card) 88'; Jiménez 89'	Report	Kolodziejczak (yellow card) 18'; Pareja (yellow card) 20'; Banega (yellow card) 88'	Stadium: Vicente Calderón; Attendance: 52,000; Referee: José Luis González González (Castile and León)

4 October 2014 7	Valencia	3–1	Atlético Madrid	Valencia
16:00 CEST (UTC+02:00)	Miranda 6' (o.g.); Gomes 7', (yellow card) 45'; Otamendi 13'; Parejo (yellow card) 58'; Fuego (yellow card) 74'; Gayà (yellow card) 90+4'	Report	Mandžukić 29'; Cerci (yellow card) 69' (yellow-red card) 90+2'	Stadium: Mestalla; Attendance: 44,000; Referee: Fernando Teixeira Vitienes (Cantabria)

19 October 2014 8	Atlético Madrid	2–0	Espanyol	Madrid
12:00 CEST (UTC+02:00)	Tiago 43'; Suárez 71'	Report		Stadium: Vicente Calderón; Attendance: 54,069; Referee: Iñaki Vicandi Garrido (Basque Country)

26 October 2014 9	Getafe	0–1	Atlético Madrid	Getafe
21:00 CET (UTC+01:00)	Alexis (red card) 56'; Lafita (yellow card) 68'; Velázquez (yellow card) 71'; Sarabia (yellow card) 90'	Report	Mandžukić 40', (yellow card) 52'; Miranda (yellow card) 57'; Siqueira (yellow card) 83'	Stadium: Coliseum Alfonso Pérez; Attendance: 9,300; Referee: Mario Melero López (Andalusia)

1 November 2014 10	Atlético Madrid	4–2	Córdoba	Madrid
18:00 CET (UTC+01:00)	Griezmann 43', 58'; Mandžukić 62'; García 80'	Report	Bouzón (yellow card) 37'; Ghilas 53', 87'; Cartabia (yellow card) 60'	Stadium: Vicente Calderón; Attendance: 48,600; Referee: Carlos Clos Gómez (Aragon)

9 November 2014 11	Real Sociedad	2–1	Atlético Madrid	San Sebastián
21:00 CET (UTC+01:00)	Vela 15', (yellow card) 23'; Berchiche (yellow card) 18'; Agirretxe 82'	Report	Mandžukić 10'; Suárez (yellow card) 13'; Turan (yellow card) 16'; Juanfran (yellow card) 17'; Siqueira (yellow card) 48' (yellow-red card) 50'; García (yellow card) 51'; Koke (yellow card) 80'; Gabi (yellow card) 81'	Stadium: Anoeta; Attendance: 22,768; Referee: Alfonso Javier Álvarez Izquierdo (Catalonia)

22 November 2014 12	Atlético Madrid	3–1	Málaga	Madrid
16:00 CET (UTC+01:00)	Tiago 12'; Griezmann 42', (yellow card) 48'; Gabi (yellow card) 53' (yellow-red card) 88'; Godín 83'	Summary	Samu (yellow card) 47' (yellow-red card) 73'; Camacho (yellow card) 50'; Torres (yellow card) 58'; Santa Cruz 64'; Sánchez (yellow card) 71'	Stadium: Vicente Calderón; Attendance: 44,200; Referee: Fernando Teixeira Vitienes (Cantabria)

30 November 2014 13	Atlético Madrid	2–0	Deportivo La Coruña	Madrid
12:00 CET (UTC+01:00)	Mandžukić (yellow card) 33'; Giménez (yellow card) 38'; Saúl 43'; Turan 55'		Juanfran (yellow card) 13'; Insua (yellow card) 40'	Stadium: Vicente Calderón; Attendance: 45,000; Referee: José Antonio Teixeira Vitienes (Cantabria)

6 December 2014 14	Elche	0–2	Atlético Madrid	Elche
16:00 CET (UTC+01:00)	Jonathas (yellow card) 41'; Roco (yellow card) 90+1'		Giménez 16'; Mandžukić 54'	Stadium: Martínez Valero; Attendance: 18,290; Referee: Iñaki Vicandi Garrido (Basque Country)

14 December 2014 15	Atlético Madrid	0–1	Villarreal	Madrid
19:00 CET (UTC+01:00)	Turan (yellow card) 28'; Mandžukić (yellow card) 41'; Juanfran (yellow card) 44'; Koke (yellow card) 88'		Uche (yellow card) 17'; Dos Santos (yellow card) 41'; Trigueros (yellow card) 55'; Vietto 84'	Stadium: Vicente Calderón; Attendance: 37,000; Referee: Pedro Jesús Pérez Montero (Andalusia)

21 December 2014 16	Athletic Bilbao	1–4	Atlético Madrid	Bilbao
21:00 CET (UTC+01:00)	Rico 17'; Aduriz (yellow card) 25'; San José (yellow card) 52'; Muniain (yellow card) 68'		Griezmann (yellow card) 28', (goal) 46', 73', 81'; García 53' (pen.); Giménez (yellow card) 74'; Turan (yellow card) 75'; Gabi (yellow card) 89'	Stadium: San Mamés; Attendance: 46,500; Referee: Alejandro José Hernández Hernández (Las Palmas)

3 January 2015 17	Atlético Madrid	3–1	Levante	Madrid
16:00 CET (UTC+01:00)	Griezmann 18', 47'; Mandžukić (yellow card) 42'; García (yellow card) 75'; Godín 82'		Juanfran (yellow card) 10'; Diop (yellow card) 23'; El Zhar 62'; Sissoko (yellow card) 75'	Stadium: Vicente Calderón; Attendance: 52,163; Referee: Alfonso Javier Álvarez Izquierdo (Catalonia)

11 January 2015 18	Barcelona	3–1	Atlético Madrid	Barcelona
21:00 CET (UTC+01:00)	Neymar 11'; Suárez 34', (yellow card) 59'; Mascherano (yellow card) 74'; Messi (yellow card) 80', (goal) 86'	Report	Gámez (yellow card) 21'; Mandžukić (yellow card) 33', (goal) 56' (pen.); Juanfran (yellow card) 49'; Tiago (yellow card) 65'; Griezmann (yellow card) 69'; Godín (yellow card) 83'	Stadium: Camp Nou; Attendance: 81,658; Referee: Alberto Undiano Mallenco (Navarre)

18 January 2015 19	Atlético Madrid	2–0	Granada	Madrid
17:00 CET (UTC+01:00)	Godín (yellow card) 9'; Suárez (yellow card) 27'; Mandžukić 34' (pen.), (yellow card) 73'; García 88'	Report	Bangoura (yellow card) 10'; Sissoko (yellow card) 33'; Nyom (yellow card) 64'	Stadium: Vicente Calderón; Attendance: 42,000; Referee: Ignacio Iglesias Villanueva (Galicia)

24 January 2015 20	Atlético Madrid	3–1	Rayo Vallecano	Madrid
20:00 CET (UTC+01:00)	Griezmann 12', 22'; Manucho 56' (o.g.); Gabi (yellow card) 81'	Report	Trashorras 35'; Baena (yellow card) 59'	Stadium: Vicente Calderón; Attendance: 37,202; Referee: Iñaki Vicandi Garrido (Basque Country)

31 January 2015 21	Eibar	1–3	Atlético Madrid	Eibar
18:00 CET (UTC+01:00)	Piovaccari (yellow card) 24', (goal) 89'; Minero (yellow card) 64'; Lillo (yellow card) 77'	Report	Griezmann 7', (yellow card) 18'; Mandžukić 23', 25'; Koke (yellow card) 27'; Saúl (yellow card) 63'	Stadium: Municipal de Ipurua; Attendance: 4,238; Referee: Pedro Jesús Pérez Montero (Andalusia)

7 February 2015 22	Atlético Madrid	4–0	Real Madrid	Madrid
16:00 CET (UTC+01:00)	Tiago 14'; Saúl 18'; Gabi (yellow card) 45'; Turan (yellow card) 49'; García (yellow card) 52'; Godín (yellow card) 54'; Griezmann 67'; Mandžukić (yellow card) 82', (goal) 89'	Report	Kroos (yellow card) 29'; Jesé (yellow card) 85'	Stadium: Vicente Calderón; Attendance: 54,900; Referee: David Fernández Borbalán (Andalusia)

15 February 2015 23	Celta Vigo	2–0	Atlético Madrid	Vigo
21:00 CET (UTC+01:00)	Nolito 59' (pen.); Orellana 71'	Report	Godín (yellow card) 57'; Suárez (yellow card) 57'; Cani (yellow card) 63'	Stadium: Balaídos; Attendance: 22,099; Referee: Juan Martínez Munuera (Valencian Community)

21 February 2015 24	Atlético Madrid	3–0	Almería	Madrid
20:00 CET (UTC+01:00)	Mandžukić 13' (pen.); Griezmann 20', 29'; Siqueira (yellow card) 58' (yellow-red card) 90+1'; García (yellow card) 76'	Report	Dubarbier (yellow card) 11'	Stadium: Vicente Calderón; Attendance: 44,000; Referee: Antonio Mateu Lahoz (Valencian Community)

1 March 2015 25	Sevilla	0–0	Atlético Madrid	Seville
19:00 CET (UTC+01:00)	Arribas (yellow card) 20'; Krychowiak (yellow card) 49'; Mbia (yellow card) 81'; Banega (yellow card) 90+2'	Report	Turan (yellow card) 37'; Gabi (yellow card) 43'; Gámez (yellow card) 51'; Griezmann (yellow card) 52'; Suárez (yellow card) 55'; Tiago (yellow card) 64'; Miranda (yellow card) 87'	Stadium: Ramón Sánchez Pizjuán; Attendance: 36,001; Referee: Carlos Clos Gómez (Aragon)

8 March 2015 26	Atlético Madrid	1–1	Valencia	Madrid
21:00 CET (UTC+01:00)	Torres (yellow card) 17'; Koke 33'; Siqueira (yellow card) 57'; Mandžukić (yellow card) 71'; Godín (yellow card) 88'; Suárez (yellow card) 90+2'	Report	Mustafi (yellow card) 31', (goal) 78'; Piatti (yellow card) 34'; Pérez (yellow card) 45+1'; Negredo (yellow card) 50'; Otamendi (yellow card) 56'; Barragán (yellow card) 88'; Fuego (yellow card) 88' (yellow-red card) 90'	Stadium: Vicente Calderón; Attendance: 49,500; Referee: Santiago Jaime Latre (Aragon)

14 March 2015 27	Espanyol	0–0	Atlético Madrid	Cornellà de Llobregat
16:00 CET (UTC+01:00)	González (yellow card) 8'; Sánchez (yellow card) 37'; López (yellow card) 60'	Report	Gabi (yellow card) 42'; Miranda (red card) 45+3'; Tiago (yellow card) 57'; García (yellow card) 78'	Stadium: Cornellà-El Prat; Attendance: 22,538; Referee: Iñaki Vicandi Garrido (Basque Country)

21 March 2015 28	Atlético Madrid	2–0	Getafe	Madrid
16:00 CET (UTC+01:00)	Torres 3'; Tiago 44', (yellow card) 62'; Gabi (yellow card) 74'	Report	Naldo (yellow card) 36'; Vigaray (yellow card) 56'	Stadium: Vicente Calderón; Attendance: 38,673; Referee: Juan Martínez Munuera (Valencian Community)

4 April 2015 29	Córdoba	0–2	Atlético Madrid	Córdoba
18:00 CEST (UTC+02:00)	Andone (yellow card) 45+1'; Gunino (yellow card) 59'	Report	Griezmann 5'; Saúl 39'; Juanfran (yellow card) 80'	Stadium: El Arcángel; Attendance: 17,659; Referee: Javier Estrada Fernández (Catalonia)

7 April 2015 30	Atlético Madrid	2–0	Real Sociedad	Madrid
20:00 CEST (UTC+02:00)	González 2' (o.g.); Griezmann 10'; Turan (yellow card) 83'	Report		Stadium: Vicente Calderón; Attendance: 42,500; Referee: Alberto Undiano Mallenco (Navarre)

11 April 2015 31	Málaga	2–2	Atlético Madrid	Málaga
18:00 CEST (UTC+02:00)	Torres 37' (o.g.); Darder (yellow card) 67'; Samu 71'; Weligton (yellow card) 78'	Report	Griezmann 25', 78', (yellow card) 88'; Gabi (yellow card) 28'; Miranda (yellow card) 85'	Stadium: La Rosaleda; Attendance: 24,500; Referee: Antonio Miguel Mateu Lahoz

18 April 2015 32	Deportivo	1–2	Atlético Madrid	A Coruña
16:00 CEST (UTC+02:00)	Toché (yellow card) 54'; Sidnei (yellow card) 72'; Riera 78'	Report	Griezmann 5', 22'; Koke (yellow card) 8'; Godín (yellow card) 26'; García (yellow card) 27'; Oblak (yellow card) 79'	Stadium: Riazor; Attendance: 24.693; Referee: Fernández Borbalán

26 April 2015 33	Atlético Madrid	3–0	Elche	Madrid
18:00 CEST (UTC+02:00)	Torres (yellow card) 25'; Griezmann 55', 77'; García 63'; Koke (yellow card) 90+2'; Gabi (yellow card) 90+2'	Report	Cisma (yellow card) 43'; Jonathas (yellow card) 53'	Stadium: Vicente Calderón; Attendance: 47.531; Referee: Clos Gómez

29 April 2015 34	Villarreal	0–1	Atlético Madrid	Vila-real
22:00 CEST (UTC+02:00)		Report	Gabi (yellow card) 41'; Gámez (yellow card) 55'; Torres 74'; Oblak (yellow card) 77'; Miranda (yellow card) 87'; Juanfran (yellow card) 89'	Stadium: El Madrigal; Attendance: 18.725; Referee: González González

2 May 2015 35	Atlético Madrid	0–0	Athletic Bilbao	Madrid
18:00 CEST (UTC+02:00)	Torres (yellow card) 41'; Godín (yellow card) 86'	Report	San José (yellow card) 71'; Bustinza (yellow card) 76' (yellow-red card) 88'; Laporte (yellow card) 81'	Stadium: Vicente Calderón; Attendance: 48.452; Referee: Jaime Latre

10 May 2015 36	Levante	2–2	Atlético Madrid	Valencia
12:00 CEST (UTC+02:00)	Barral 32', (yellow card) 87'; Toño (yellow card) 39'; Uche 63'	Report	Siqueira 35'; Tiago (yellow card) 54'; Miranda (yellow card) 73'; Torres 80'	Stadium: Ciutat de València; Attendance: 19.314; Referee: Hernández Hernández

17 May 2015 37	Atlético Madrid	0–1	Barcelona	Madrid
19:00 CEST (UTC+02:00)	Godín (yellow card) 32'; Koke (yellow card) 53'; Gabi (yellow card) 75'; Giménez (yellow card) 89'; Siqueira (yellow card) 90+4'	Report	Pedro (yellow card) 29'; Messi 65', (yellow card) 90+4'; Neymar (yellow card) 90+2'	Stadium: Vicente Calderón; Attendance: 53.254; Referee: Undiano Mallenco

24 May 2015 38	Granada	0–0	Atlético Madrid	Granada
18:30 CEST (UTC+02:00)		Report		Stadium: Nuevo Los Cármenes; Attendance: 20.848; Referee: González González

Source:Atlético Madrid.com

=== Copa del Rey ===
==== Round of 32 ====
Win Draw Loss

3 December 2014 First leg	L'Hospitalet	0–3	Atlético Madrid	L'Hospitalet de Llobregat
20:00 CET (UTC+01:00)		Report	Griezmann 67'; Gabi 81' (pen.); Rodríguez 90'	Stadium: La Feixa Llarga; Attendance: 2,500; Referee: David Fernández Borbalán (Andalusia)

18 December 2014 Second leg	Atlético Madrid	2–2 (5–2 agg.)	L'Hospitalet	Madrid
20:00 CET (UTC+01:00)	Mandžukić 19', 74'	Report	Alcaraz 67', 84'	Stadium: Vicente Calderón; Attendance: 10,000; Referee: Mario Melero López (Andalusia)

==== Round of 16 ====
7 January 2015 First leg	Atlético Madrid	2–0	Real Madrid	Madrid
21:00 CET (UTC+01:00)	García 58' (pen.), (yellow card) 74'; Gámez (yellow card) 61'; Griezmann (yellow card) 64'; Gabi (yellow card) 73'; Giménez 76'; Godín (yellow card) 87'; Mandžukić (yellow card) 87'	Report	Marcelo (yellow card) 27'; Khedira (yellow card) 31'; Ramos (yellow card) 57'; Carvajal (yellow card) 89'	Stadium: Vicente Calderón Stadium; Attendance: 46,800; Referee: Carlos Clos Gómez (Aragon)

15 January 2015 Second leg	Real Madrid	2–2 (2–4 agg.)	Atlético Madrid	Madrid
20:00 CET (UTC+01:00)	Ramos 20', (yellow card) 55'; Ronaldo 54'; Marcelo (yellow card) 82'; Carvajal (yellow card) 85'; Isco (yellow card) 89'	Report	Torres 1', 46'; García (yellow card) 27'; Tiago (yellow card) 48'; Godín (yellow card) 51'; Koke (yellow card) 83'	Stadium: Santiago Bernabéu; Attendance: 81,000; Referee: Antonio Mateu Lahoz (Valencian Community)

==== Quarter-finals ====
21 January 2015 First leg	Barcelona	1–0	Atlético Madrid	Barcelona
22:00 CET (UTC+01:00)	Suárez (yellow card) 79'; Mascherano (yellow card) 81'; Messi 85'	Report	Juanfran (yellow card) 45'; Miranda (yellow card) 83'; Gabi (yellow card) 84'; Godín (yellow card) 90+1'	Stadium: Camp Nou; Attendance: 62,225; Referee: José González González (Castile and León)

28 January 2015 Second leg	Atlético Madrid	2–3 (2–4 agg.)	Barcelona	Madrid
21:00 CET (UTC+01:00)	Torres 1'; García (yellow card) 14', (goal) 30' (pen.); Gabi (yellow card) 41' (red card) 45+1'; Turan (yellow card) 48'; Suárez (yellow card) 69' (yellow-red card) 84'; Siqueira (yellow card) 75'; Giménez (yellow card) 83'; Cani (yellow card) 86'	Report	Neymar 9', 41'; Mascherano (yellow card) 29'; Miranda 38' (o.g.); Messi (yellow card) 44'; Dani Alves (yellow card) 74'	Stadium: Vicente Calderón; Attendance: 54,851; Referee: Jesús Gil Manzano (Extremadura)

=== UEFA Champions League ===
==== Group stage ====
Pos	Team	Pld	W	D	L	GF	GA	GD	Pts	Qualification	ATM	JUV	OLY	MAL
1	(Spain) Atlético Madrid	6	4	1	1	14	3	+11	13	Advance to knockout phase	—	1–0	4–0	5–0
2	(Italy) Juventus	6	3	1	2	7	4	+3	10	Advance to knockout phase	0–0	—	3–2	2–0
3	(Greece) Olympiacos	6	3	0	3	10	13	−3	9	Transfer to Europa League	3–2	1–0	—	4–2
4	(Sweden) Malmö FF	6	1	0	5	4	15	−11	3		0–2	0–2	2–0	—

Source: UEFA
Rules for classification: Group stage tiebreakers

Win Draw Loss

16 September 2014 1	Olympiacos (Greece)	3–2	(Spain) Atlético Madrid	Piraeus, Greece
20:45 CEST (UTC+02:00)	Masuaku 13'; Afellay 31'; Domínguez (yellow card) 36'; Maniatis (yellow card) 45+2'; Mitroglou 73'	Report	Gabi (yellow card) 2'; Mandžukić 38'; Koke (yellow card) 45+2'; Griezmann 86', (yellow card) 90'; Saúl (yellow card) 89'	Stadium: Karaiskakis Stadium; Attendance: 31,946; Referee: Pedro Proença (Portugal)

1 October 2014 2	Atlético Madrid (Spain)	1–0	(Italy) Juventus	Madrid, Spain
20:45 CEST (UTC+02:00)	García (yellow card) 54'; Ansaldi (yellow card) 63'; Turan 75'	Report	Bonucci (yellow card) 13'; Chiellini (yellow card) 57'; Lichtsteiner (yellow card) 85'; Morata (yellow card) 86'; Pogba (yellow card) 90+1'	Stadium: Vicente Calderón; Attendance: 44,322; Referee: Felix Brych (Germany)

22 October 2014 3	Atlético Madrid (Spain)	5–0	(Sweden) Malmö FF	Madrid, Spain
20:45 CEST (UTC+02:00)	Godín (yellow card) 45+2', (goal) 87'; Koke 48'; Mandžukić 61'; Griezmann 63'; Cerci 90+3'	Report	E. Johansson (yellow card) 68'; Rosenberg (yellow card) 72'	Stadium: Vicente Calderón; Attendance: 34,502; Referee: Matej Jug (Slovenia)

4 November 2014 4	Malmö FF (Sweden)	0–2	(Spain) Atlético Madrid	Malmö, Sweden
20:45 CET (UTC+01:00)	Kroon (yellow card) 82'; Halsti (yellow card) 83'; Eriksson (yellow card) 90+1'	Report	Gabi (yellow card) 8'; Koke 30'; Miranda (yellow card) 50'; Godín (yellow card) 51'; Juanfran (yellow card) 53'; García 78'; Rodríguez (yellow card) 90+5'	Stadium: Swedbank Stadion; Attendance: 20,500; Referee: Mark Clattenburg (England)

26 November 2014 5	Atlético Madrid (Spain)	4–0	(Greece) Olympiacos	Madrid, Spain
20:45 CET (UTC+01:00)	García 9'; Ansaldi (yellow card) 15'; Mandžukić 38', 62', 65'; Jiménez (yellow card) 86'	Report	N'Dinga (yellow card) 53'; Fuster (yellow card) 56'	Stadium: Vicente Calderón; Attendance: 40,121; Referee: Wolfgang Stark (Germany)

9 December 2014 6	Juventus (Italy)	0–0	(Spain) Atlético Madrid	Turin, Italy
20:45 CET (UTC+01:00)	Vidal (yellow card) 22'	Report	Suárez (yellow card) 26'; Siqueira (yellow card) 37'	Stadium: Juventus Stadium; Attendance: 39,219; Referee: Willie Collum (Scotland)

==== Knockout phase ====
===== Round of 16 =====
25 February 2015 First leg	Bayer Leverkusen (Germany)	1–0	(Spain) Atlético Madrid	Leverkusen, Germany
20:45 CET (UTC+01:00)	Papadopoulos (yellow card) 36'; Çalhanoğlu 57'; Wendell (yellow card) 58'; Bender (yellow card) 62'; Castro (yellow card) 88'; Kießling (yellow card) 89'	Report	Tiago (yellow card) 22' (yellow-red card) 76'; Godín (yellow card) 60'; Torres (yellow card) 89'; Gámez (yellow card) 90+2'	Stadium: BayArena; Attendance: 29,079; Referee: Pavel Královec (Czech Republic)

17 March 2015 Second leg	Atlético Madrid (Spain)	1–0 (a.e.t.) (1–1 agg.) (3–2 p)	(Germany) Bayer Leverkusen	Madrid, Spain
20:45 CET (UTC+01:00)	Suárez 27'	Report		Stadium: Vicente Calderón; Attendance: 48,273; Referee: Nicola Rizzoli (Italy)
	Penalties
	García (penalty missed); Griezmann (penalty scored); Suárez (penalty scored); Koke (penalty missed); Torres (penalty scored)		(penalty missed) Çalhanoğlu; (penalty scored) Rolfes; (penalty missed) Toprak; (penalty scored) Castro; (penalty missed) Kießling

===== Quarter-finals =====
14 April 2015 First leg	Atlético Madrid (Spain)	0–0	(Spain) Real Madrid	Madrid, Spain
20:45 CEST (UTC+02:00)	Mandžukić (yellow card) 55'; García (yellow card) 80'; Suárez (yellow card) 85'	Report	Ramos (yellow card) 80'; Marcelo (yellow card) 89'	Stadium: Vicente Calderón; Attendance: 52,553; Referee: Milorad Mažić (Serbia); Man of the Match: Jan Oblak

22 April 2015 Second leg	Real Madrid (Spain)	1–0 (1–0 agg.)	(Spain) Atlético Madrid	Madrid, Spain
20:45 CEST (UTC+02:00)	Pepe (yellow card) 74'; Hernández 88'; Arbeloa (yellow card) 90+3'	Report	Turan (yellow card) 31' (yellow-red card) 76'; García (yellow card) 74'; Koke (yellow card) 90+4'	Stadium: Santiago Bernabéu; Attendance: 78,300; Referee: Felix Brych (Germany); Man of the Match: Javier Hernández

== Statistics ==
=== Squad statistics ===
Updated 25 May 2015

No.	Pos.	Name	Total		La Liga		Cup		Champions League		Supercup	
1	GK	(Spain) Miguel Ángel Moyà	36	0	27	0	0	0	7	0	2	0
2	DF	(Uruguay) Diego Godín	48	4	34	3	3	0	9	1	2	0
3	DF	(Brazil) Guilherme Siqueira	37	1	25	1	4	0	6	0	2	0
4	MF	(Spain) Mario Suárez	35	2	20	1	6	0	8	1	1	0
5	MF	(Portugal) Tiago	37	5	31	5	1	0	4	0	1	0
6	MF	(Spain) Koke	49	4	34	2	4	0	9	2	2	0
7	FW	(France) Antoine Griezmann	53	25	37	22	5	1	9	2	2	0
8	MF	(Spain) Raúl García	47	10	31	5	4	2	10	2	2	1
9	FW	(Croatia) Mario Mandžukić	43	20	28	12	3	2	10	5	2	1
10	MF	(Turkey) Arda Turan	46	3	32	2	4	0	10	1	0	0
11	FW	(Mexico) Raúl Jiménez	28	1	21	1	4	0	1	0	2	0
13	GK	(Slovenia) Jan Oblak	21	0	11	0	6	0	4	0	0	0
14	MF	(Spain) Gabi	48	1	34	0	5	1	7	0	2	0
15	DF	(Argentina) Cristian Ansaldi	11	0	7	0	0	0	3	0	1	0
17	MF	(Spain) Saúl	35	4	24	4	4	0	5	0	2	0
18	DF	(Spain) Jesús Gámez	21	0	14	0	4	0	3	0	0	0
19	FW	(Spain) Fernando Torres	26	6	19	3	4	3	3	0	0	0
20	DF	(Spain) Juanfran	50	0	35	0	3	0	10	0	2	0
22	MF	(Spain) Cani	6	0	4	0	1	0	1	0	0	0
23	DF	(Brazil) Miranda	36	3	23	3	3	0	8	0	2	0
24	DF	(Uruguay) José Giménez	28	2	20	1	4	1	4	0	0	0
28	DF	(France) Lucas Hernandez	4	0	1	0	3	0	0	0	0	0
Players who left the club in Summer/Winter transfer window or on loan
—	FW	(Italy) Alessio Cerci	9	1	6	0	1	0	2	1	0	0
—	MF	(Uruguay) Cristian Rodríguez	11	1	6	0	2	1	2	0	1	0
Own goals			–	2	–	2	–	0	–	0	–	0
TOTALS			–	95	–	67	–	11	–	15	–	2

=== Goalscorers ===
Rank	Position	Number	Player	La Liga	Supercopa de España	Copa del Rey	UEFA Champions League	Total
1	FW	7	(France) Antoine Griezmann	22	0	1	2	25
2	FW	9	(Croatia) Mario Mandžukić	12	1	2	5	20
3	MF	8	(Spain) Raúl García	5	1	2	2	10
4	FW	19	(Spain) Fernando Torres	3	0	3	0	6
5	MF	5	(Portugal) Tiago	5	0	0	0	5
6	DF	2	(Uruguay) Diego Godín	3	0	0	1	4
6	MF	6	(Spain) Koke	2	0	0	2	4
6	MF	17	(Spain) Saúl	4	0	0	0	4
9	MF	10	(Turkey) Arda Turan	2	0	0	1	3
9	DF	23	(Brazil) Miranda	3	0	0	0	3
11	MF	4	(Spain) Mario Suárez	1	0	0	1	2
11	DF	24	(Uruguay) José Giménez	1	0	1	0	2
13	DF	3	(Brazil) Guilherme Siqueira	1	0	0	0	1
13	FW	11	(Mexico) Raúl Jiménez	1	0	0	0	1
13	MF	14	(Spain) Gabi	0	0	1	0	1
13	MF	21	(Uruguay) Cristian Rodríguez^{1}	0	0	1	0	1
13	MF	22	(Italy) Alessio Cerci^{1}	0	0	0	1	1
Own goals				2	0	0	0	2
TOTALS				67	2	11	15	95

^{1}Player left the club during the season.
