= 2014–15 Real Madrid CF season =

111th season in existence of Real Madrid CF

Real Madrid
2014–15 season
- President: Florentino Pérez
- Head coach: Carlo Ancelotti
- Stadium: Santiago Bernabéu
- La Liga: 2nd
- Copa del Rey: Round of 16
- Supercopa de España: Runners-up
- UEFA Champions League: Semi-finals
- UEFA Super Cup: Winners
- FIFA Club World Cup: Winners
- Top goalscorer: League: Cristiano Ronaldo (48); All: Cristiano Ronaldo (61)
- Highest home attendance: 85,450 (vs Barcelona, 25 October 2014)
- Lowest home attendance: 46,200 (vs Cornellà, 2 December 2014)
- Average home league attendance: 72,536
- Biggest win: Real Madrid 9–1 Granada
- Biggest defeat: Atlético Madrid 4–0 Real Madrid
| Home colours | Away colours | Third colours |

The 2014–15 season was Real Madrid Club de Fútbol's 111th season in existence and the club's 84th consecutive season in the top flight of Spanish football. It covered a period from 1 July 2014 to 30 June 2015. This was also legendary goalkeeper Iker Casillas's 16th and last season at Real Madrid and in La Liga.

After a slow start to the season, Real Madrid went on a record-breaking 22-match winning streak, which included wins against Barcelona and Liverpool, surpassing the previous Spanish record of 18 successive wins set by Frank Rijkaard's Barça in the 2005–06 season. In late December, Real Madrid won their first Club World Cup, defeating San Lorenzo 2–0 in the final. The winning streak came to an end in their opening match of 2015 with a loss to Valencia, leaving the club two short of equalling the world record of 24 consecutive wins. Madrid was in contention for both the La Liga title and the UEFA Champions League until the very end but ultimately came up short, finishing with 92 points in the league, two behind treble-winning Barcelona and losing their Champions League crown to Juventus 2–3 on aggregate in the Champions League semi-finals. Cristiano Ronaldo finished the season scoring 48 league goals, winning his fourth European Golden Shoe, and 61 goals in all competitions, breaking his record from 2011–12.

Overall, despite playing an attractive attacking football and being the highest scoring team in Europe with 118 league goals, several heartbreaking defeats meant that Real finished the season with two trophies out of six possible, which contributed to the dismissal of Carlo Ancelotti. Ancelotti would return to coach the team in 2021.

== Season overview ==
=== Pre-season ===
On 25 June 2014, Zinedine Zidane was named as the coach of Real Madrid Castilla and would manage the B team, while Real Madrid confirmed the appointment of Fernando Hierro as an assistant coach to Carlo Ancelotti, replacing Zidane.

Real Madrid's pre-season began on 14 July. Ancelotti had 22 players at his disposal, including 12 from Castilla. The players who were involved in the 2014 FIFA World Cup were still on vacation.

On 17 July, Madrid signed World Cup winner Toni Kroos on a six-year deal for a fee around €25 million to €30 million. Kroos became Madrid's first summer signing of the season.

Álvaro Morata was sold to Juventus for a fee of €20 million, while Madrid retained the option of resigning him for a fee of €30 million after the first year and €36 million after the second, while Denis Cheryshev and Casemiro were loaned to Villarreal and Porto respectively for the upcoming season.

On 21 July, Madrid set off on their pre-season tour of the United States. Nineteen players were among the travelling party, with Ancelotti opting to take nine from Real Madrid Castilla to compensate for the absences of Madrid's World Cup players, who remained on holiday. However, Xabi Alonso, Pepe and Fábio Coentrão did fly to the U.S. and cut their summer breaks short and joined the rest of the team. Jesé stayed in Madrid to go on with his treatment at Valdebebas.

Madrid reached an agreement with Monaco on 22 July for World Cup Golden Boot winner James Rodríguez, who signed a six-year contract for a fee of €75 million, becoming the fourth most expensive player in world football, behind Cristiano Ronaldo, Gareth Bale and Luis Suárez.

=== August ===
On 3 August, Costa Rican goalkeeper Keylor Navas was signed from Levante for €10 million following his exuberant performances at the 2014 World Cup.

A day later, Jesús Fernández switched sides and joined Levante for a reported fee of €500,000.

In their first competitive match of the season, Madrid played Sevilla in the 2014 edition of the UEFA Super Cup. The game saw the debuts of World Cup stars James Rodríguez and Toni Kroos, as Madrid defeated the Europa League winners. On the half-hour mark, Cristiano Ronaldo broke the deadlock and helped Madrid to a lead 1–0 at half time. In the second half, it was again Ronaldo who scored and the game ended 2–0, with Madrid capturing their second Super Cup title.

The following day, Madrid had reached an agreement with Milan for the transfer of Diego López to the Italian club.

In the 2014 Supercopa de España against Atlético Madrid, the first leg ended with a 1–1 draw after goals from James Rodríguez and Raúl García, going into the Estadio Vicente Calderón. Mario Mandžukić shocked Real early on after just two minutes in the second leg with the only goal of the match, which meant that Atlético won the title.

After months of speculation, Ángel Di María completed his move to Manchester United for a British record fee of €75 million (£59.7M) on 26 August. The deal also included a possible of €5.5 million (£4.3M) in add-ons.

Xabi Alonso joined Bayern Munich for €10 million on 29 August 2014.

After winning their first league match against Córdoba 2–0 by goals from Karim Benzema and Cristiano Ronaldo, Madrid lost their first game in this year's league campaign at Real Sociedad 2–4. Even though Los Blancos took the early two-goal lead by Sergio Ramos and Gareth Bale, Sociedad tied the game at halftime before they went on to score two more in the second half.

=== September ===
On 1 September 2014, Madrid signed Javier Hernández on a season-long loan deal from Manchester United. Real Madrid had an option to buy the player for a fee of €22 million next season. He became Real Madrid's first Mexican player in 22 years, with Hugo Sánchez having been the last one to play for the club up to that point.

The league match between Real and Atlético was their third meeting of this season already in September. After the visitors took an early lead, Ronaldo equalized through a penalty before Arda Turan scored the decisive goal 14 minutes before the end of the match.

In their first Champions League match after winning La Decima, Madrid got off to a good start by defeating Basel 5–1, scoring four goals in 22 minutes during the first half.

Real Madrid then faced Deportivo de La Coruña at the Riazor, then the only stadium in the league at which Ronaldo had not scored in. Real went on to produce a thumping 8–2 win, with a hat-trick from Ronaldo, braces by Bale and Hernández, and James chipping in with a goal. This also marked the first time that Real had scored eight goals on the road in the league. With that, Real scored 13 goals in just two matches in a span of four days. Madrid continued their fine scoring form with a 5–1 win over Elche CF, with Ronaldo scoring four times.

A goal each from Luka Modrić and Ronaldo helped Real beat Villarreal 2–0, with Ronaldo scoring his tenth league goal in only five games.

=== October ===
In the Champions League, Madrid took on newcomers Ludogorets Razgrad. After a surprising start, a missed penalty and being down 0–1, Ronaldo and Benzema were able to turn the game around to a 2–1 win.

Back to the league campaign, Madrid took on Athletic Bilbao at home and came up with a convincing 5–0 victory, thanks to a hat-trick from Ronaldo and a brace from Benzema.

After the international break, Madrid faced Levante on the road. Ronaldo got the scoring going with a penalty and Hernández pushed the lead to 2–0 at half-time. After the break, Ronaldo added his second, with James and Isco chipped in the other goals to make it a 5–0 victory.

In the third matchday of the Champions League, Madrid visited Anfield to face Liverpool. Ronaldo scored a spectacular flick and Benzema added a brace to give Los Blancos a 3–0 win.

Back to La Liga, Real took on Barcelona in another edition of El Clásico. Despite an early shock by Neymar, Ronaldo was able to tie the game by half-time. Pepe and Benzema then scored in the second half to give Madrid a 3–1 victory.

Starting the 2014–15 Copa del Rey campaign, Madrid took on Cornellà while resting several first team squad members. Two goals from Raphaël Varane and one each from Hernández and Marcelo gave Real a 4–1 victory.

=== November ===
The new month started with an away trip to Granada, which was ended successfully in a 4–0 victory after goals from Ronaldo, a Rodríguez brace and Benzema. This marked the seventh straight win for Real.

Taking on Liverpool at the fourth matchday of the Champions League campaign, Real was able to get a narrow 1–0 victory, by a goal from Benzema. With this victory, Real booked their spot in the round of 16 two matchdays before the group stage concluded.

Before the international break, Madrid took on Rayo Vallecano. Bale, who returned from injury, and Ramos got Los Blancos a 2–0 lead, which was reduced to a one-goal lead at half-time. Toni Kroos with his first goal for Madrid, Benzema and Ronaldo then produced a convincing second half display and lifted Real to a 5–1 victory.

With Modrić sidelined due to an injury sustained while on national team duty (that eventually kept him out until early March), Madrid took on SD Eibar for the first time in club history. Real got a 4–0 victory after a brace from Ronaldo and goals from James and Benzema, which secured their top position in the league.

Thanks to a goal from Ronaldo, Madrid won against Basel in the Champions League, which marked their 15th consecutive win in all competitions.

In an away match at Málaga, Real was able to squeeze out a 1–2 win after goals from Benzema and Bale. This marked team's 16th win in a row and their second "perfect" month of the season.

=== December ===
In their second leg match against Cornellà, Ancelotti again opted to rest regular starters and give other players a chance. The game also marked the return of Jesé, who also scored in a 5–0 victory (9–1 on aggregate), alongside a brace from Rodríguez, a goal from Isco and an own goal.

Playing with their regular starter team, Madrid took on Celta de Vigo and won 3–0, thanks to a hat-trick by Ronaldo, who reached the milestone of 200 league goals for Real Madrid. It was Ronaldo's fourth hat-trick of the season.

Madrid finished up the group stage of the Champions League with a 4–0 victory over Ludogorets Razgrad with goals from Ronaldo, Bale, Álvaro Arbeloa and Álvaro Medrán. Real repeated its feat from the 2011–12 season, winning all six Champions League group stage games, an achievement not matched by any other team in the tournament's history. With that win, Madrid set a new record in Spanish football by winning their 19th-straight game.

Real Madrid extended their streak to 20 consecutive wins with a 4–1 victory against Almería after a brace from Ronaldo and goals from Isco and Bale.

Their next game took place at the 2014 FIFA Club World Cup against Cruz Azul in the semi-finals. Goals from Ramos, Bale, Benzema and Isco secured a 4–0 victory and a place in the final.

The final was won 2–0 against San Lorenzo of Argentina after goals by Ramos and Bale. It was the first Club World Cup title for Madrid. It was also their 22nd consecutive win in the current season.

=== January ===
The new year started off with an away game at the Mestalla Stadium facing Valencia. Even though Ronaldo got Real in front, Madrid was not able to close the game and lost 1–2. This was the team's first loss after 22 straight wins.

Facing Atlético Madrid in the first leg of the Copa del Rey round of 16, Los Blancos were not able to come away with a win, losing El Derbi madrileño 0–2.

Against Espanyol, goals from Rodríguez, Bale and Nacho, who scored his first professional goal for Madrid, secured Real a 3–0 victory to get back on track after two consecutive losses.

In the second leg of the Copa del Rey round of 16, Real needed to cancel out Atlético's two-goal advantage. Ronaldo and Ramos scored, but that was not enough, as Madrid conceded two, and the match ended 2–2 and 2–4 on aggregate, therefore ending Real's attempt to defend the Copa del Rey title.

Against Getafe, Madrid was able to squeeze a 3–0 victory after a second half Ronaldo brace and a goal from Bale.

In the transfer period, Madrid signed Martin Ødegaard and Lucas Silva. Ødegaard would only train with the first team but play with Real Madrid Castilla.

Starting the second half of the season at Córdoba, Real needed a late penalty converted by Bale to come away with a 2–1 victory. Benzema scored the equalizer in the first half while Ronaldo was sent off by the referee.

A brace from Benzema and goals from Rodríguez and Ramos secured a 4–1 home victory for Madrid against Real Sociedad to finish January.

=== February ===
In their first match of February, Real earned a 2–1 win against Sevilla, with goals from Rodríguez and Jesé.

Without five regular starters, Real suffered a 0–4 loss against Atlético, with goals from Tiago, Saúl (who scored a beautiful overhead kick), Antoine Griezmann and Mario Mandžukić.

Goals from Isco and Benzema gave Madrid a 2–0 victory against Deportivo.

In a rematch of last year's round of 16 in the Champions League against Schalke 04, Real secured a 2–0 first leg away victory with goals from Ronaldo and Marcelo.

Goals from Benzema and Ronaldo against Elche gave Real a four-point gap at the top of the table.

=== March ===
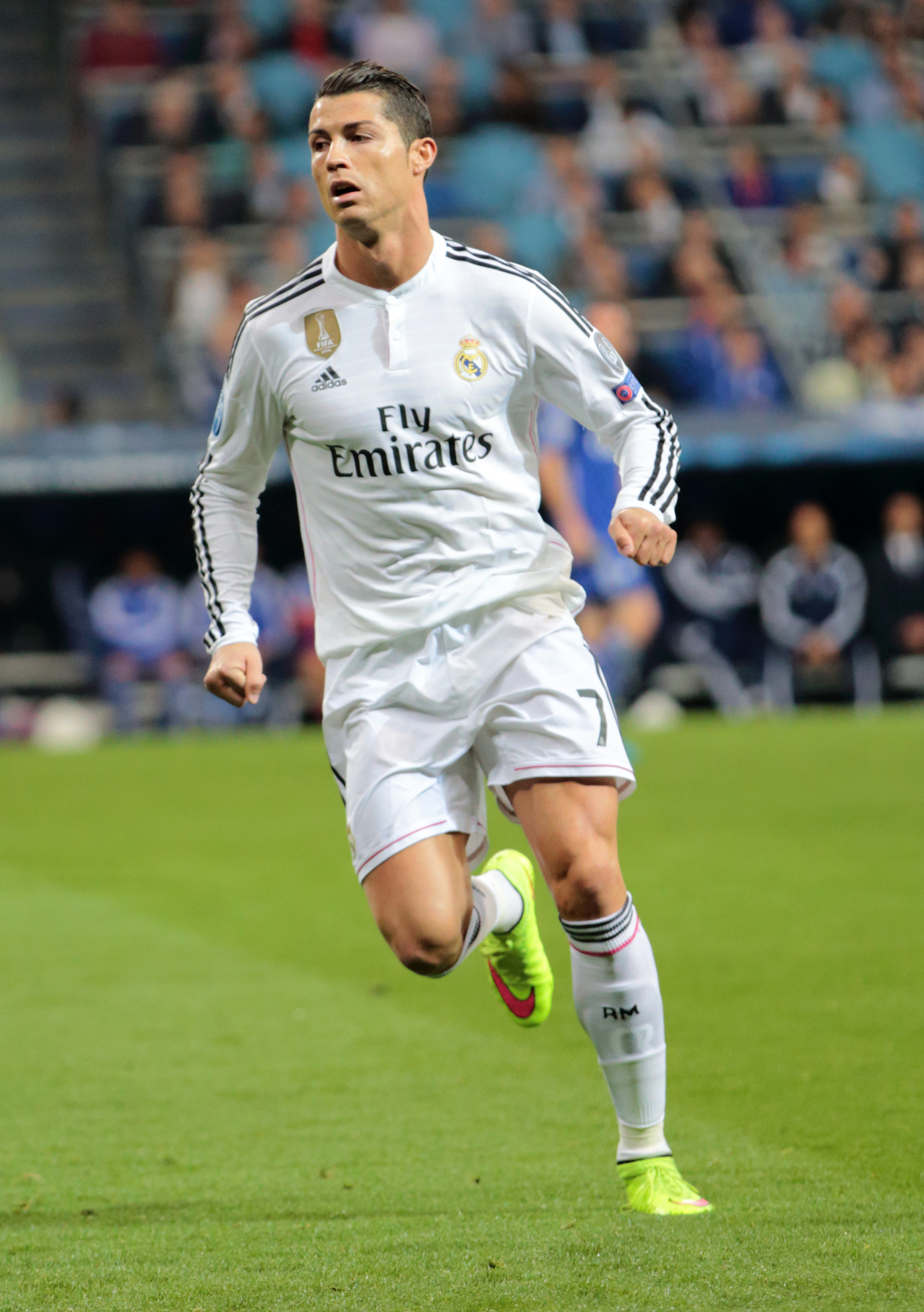
Cristiano Ronaldo in action against Schalke 04

A goal from Ronaldo, which made him the first player to score over 30 goals in five consecutive seasons in a European top league, was not enough to get past Villarreal, as the game ended 1–1.

Madrid visited Bilbao the next matchday and lost 0–1, with a header from Aritz Aduriz in the 26th minute.

Taking on Schalke in the return leg of the round of 16 in the Champions League, Real had their hands full not to get knocked out. Two goals from Ronaldo and another one from Benzema saved Real's victory on aggregate, even though they lost the game 3–4.

A first-half brace from Bale gave Madrid a 2–0 win against Levante before the Clásico.

Real suffered a major setback in the title race after losing to Barcelona 1–2 away from home. Ronaldo scored the lone goal for Madrid.

=== April ===
On 1 April, Madrid confirmed the signing of Porto and Brazil full back Danilo for a fee of €31 million on a five-year deal; he would join the squad at the beginning of the 2015–16 season.

Coming out of the international break, Real thrashed Granada 9–1 at the Bernabéu, with Ronaldo scoring five goals. The other goals came from Bale, a brace from Benzema and an own goal.

Playing at Vallecano, Madrid was held scoreless until minutes after the hour mark before Ronaldo and Rodríguez helped Real to get a 2–0 victory.

Goals from Ronaldo, Hernández and Jesé gave Madrid a 3–0 win over Eibar while resting some key players.

Real visited the Vicente Calderón to play their local rivals Atlético Madrid in the first leg of the quarter-finals in the Champions League. The match ended in a goalless draw. This was the seventh time both teams faced each other this season.

Against Málaga, Los Blancos were able to get a 3–1 victory after goals from Ramos, Rodríguez and Ronaldo. The goal by Ronaldo meant he had scored at least 50 goals for the fifth consecutive season.

A late goal from Hernández after a brilliant solo run by Ronaldo gave Real their first victory in eight matches against Atlético this season and helped them reach the semi-finals of the Champions League for the fifth consecutive time.

A brace from Hernández and goals from Rodríguez and Kroos gave Madrid a 2–4 win at Vigo to keep their title dreams alive.

In a midweek game, Real was able to get past Almería by a score of 3–0, thanks to a goal from Álvaro Arbeloa, an own goal and a wonder goal from Rodríguez.

=== May ===
A hat-trick from Ronaldo propelled Madrid to a 3–2 win over Sevilla. This was Sevilla's first home defeat since 13 March 2014, when they lost 2–0 to Betis in the Europa League round of 16, and their first home league defeat since 9 February 2014, when they lost 4–1 to Barcelona.

Despite a goal from Ronaldo, Real came up short in the first leg of the Champions League semi-finals against Juventus, losing 1–2.

A 2–2 draw against Valencia, with goals from Pepe and Isco, damaged the hopes of winning the league title.

The return leg against Juventus ended in a 1–1 draw, and the dream of defending the Champions League title was shattered in the semi-finals. Ronaldo scored again and finished the competition with 10 goals, tied for most.

Ronaldo scored a brilliant hat-trick, but a 4–1 victory over Espanyol was not enough to capture the title as Barcelona won their game against Atlético Madrid 1–0, which assured Real Madrid the second place until the end of the season. This was Ronaldo's seventh hat-trick of the season.

In their last match of the season, Real hosted Getafe and defeated them 7–3 with yet another hat-trick from Ronaldo, who finished the season scoring 61 goals in all competitions, breaking his own record from 2011–12. The Portuguese also became the highest scoring Madridista for the sixth consecutive season. He would go on to accomplish the feat every season until 2018 when he left the club.

== Kits ==
Supplier: Adidas / Sponsor: Fly Emirates

| Home | Away | Third | Third alt. | Goalkeeper 1 | Goalkeeper 2 | Goalkeeper 3 |

== Players ==
| N | Pos. | Nat. | Name | Age | EU | Since | App | Goals | Ends | Transfer fee | Notes |
|---|---|---|---|---|---|---|---|---|---|---|---|
| 1 | GK | (Spain) | Iker Casillas (captain) | 33 | EU | 1999 | 725 | 0 | 2017 | Youth system | |
| 2 | CB | (France) | Raphaël Varane | 21 | EU | 2011 | 117 | 6 | 2020 | €10M | |
| 3 | CB | (Portugal) | Pepe (3rd VC) | 31 | EU | 2007 | 286 | 12 | 2016 | €30M | Second nationality: Brazil |
| 4 | CB | (Spain) | Sergio Ramos (vice-captain) | 28 | EU | 2005 | 445 | 55 | 2017 | €28M | |
| 5 | LB | (Portugal) | Fábio Coentrão | 26 | EU | 2011 | 100 | 1 | 2017 | €30M | |
| 6 | DM | (Germany) | Sami Khedira | 27 | EU | 2010 | 161 | 9 | 2015 | €12M | Second nationality: Tunisia |
| 7 | LW | (Portugal) | Cristiano Ronaldo | 29 | EU | 2009 | 300 | 313 | 2018 | €94M | |
| 8 | CM | (Germany) | Toni Kroos | 24 | EU | 2014 | 55 | 2 | 2020 | €25M | |
| 9 | ST | (France) | Karim Benzema | 26 | EU | 2009 | 282 | 133 | 2019 | €35M | Second nationality: Algeria |
| 10 | AM | (Colombia) | James Rodríguez | 23 | Non-EU | 2014 | 46 | 17 | 2020 | €80M | |
| 11 | RW | (Wales) | Gareth Bale | 25 | EU | 2013 | 92 | 39 | 2019 | €100M | |
| 12 | LB | (Brazil) | Marcelo (2nd VC) | 26 | EU | 2007 (Winter) | 319 | 23 | 2018 | €6.5M | Second nationality: Spain |
| 13 | GK | (Costa Rica) | Keylor Navas | 27 | EU | 2014 | 11 | 0 | 2020 | €10M | Second nationality: Spain |
| 14 | ST | (Mexico) | Javier Hernández | 26 | Non-EU | 2014 | 32 | 9 | 2015 | Loan | |
| 15 | RB | (Spain) | Dani Carvajal | 22 | EU | 2013 | 88 | 2 | 2019 | €6.5M | Originally from youth system |
| 16 | DM | (Brazil) | Lucas Silva | 21 | Non-EU | 2015 (Winter) | 9 | 0 | 2020 | €14M | |
| 17 | RB | (Spain) | Álvaro Arbeloa | 31 | EU | 2009 | 228 | 6 | 2016 | €4.5M | Originally from youth system |
| 18 | CB | (Spain) | Nacho | 24 | EU | 2012 | 57 | 1 | 2021 | Youth system | |
| 19 | CM | (Croatia) | Luka Modrić | 28 | EU | 2012 | 129 | 7 | 2018 | €30M | |
| 20 | LW | (Spain) | Jesé | 21 | EU | 2011 | 56 | 12 | 2018 | Youth system | |
| 23 | AM | (Spain) | Isco | 22 | EU | 2013 | 106 | 17 | 2018 | €27M | |
| 24 | DM | (Spain) | Asier Illarramendi | 24 | EU | 2013 | 90 | 3 | 2019 | €32.2M | |
| 25 | GK | (Spain) | Fernando Pacheco | 22 | EU | 2014 | 2 | 0 | 2019 | Youth system | |

- Last updated: 23 May 2015
- Source: realmadrid.com

== Transfers ==
=== In ===
| No. | Pos. | Nat. | Name | Age | EU | Moving from | Type | Transfer window | Ends | Transfer fee | Source |
|---|---|---|---|---|---|---|---|---|---|---|---|
| 8 | CM | (Germany) | Toni Kroos | 24 | EU | Bayern Munich (Germany) | Transfer | Summer | 2020 | €25M | Real Madrid CF |
| 10 | AM | (Colombia) | James Rodríguez | 23 | Non-EU | Monaco (France) | Transfer | Summer | 2020 | €76M | Real Madrid CF |
| 13 | GK | (Costa Rica) | Keylor Navas | 27 | Non-EU | Levante | Transfer | Summer | 2020 | €10M | Real Madrid CF |
| 14 | ST | (Mexico) | Javier Hernández | 26 | Non-EU | Manchester United (England) | Loan | Summer | 2015 | €2.5M | Real Madrid CF |
| 25 | GK | (Spain) | Fernando Pacheco | 22 | EU | Real Madrid Castilla | Promoted | Summer | 2019 | Free | Real Madrid CF |
| 16 | MF | (Brazil) | Lucas Silva | 21 | Non-EU | Cruzeiro (Brazil) | Transfer | Winter | 2020 | €14M | Real Madrid CF |

Total expenditure: €127.5M

=== Out ===
| No. | Pos. | Nat. | Name | Age | EU | Moving to | Type | Transfer window | Transfer fee | Source |
|---|---|---|---|---|---|---|---|---|---|---|
| | CM | (Turkey) | Nuri Şahin | 25 | EU | Borussia Dortmund (Germany) | Transfer | Summer | €7M | Borussia Dortmund |
| | RW | (Russia) | Denis Cheryshev | 23 | EU | Villarreal | Loan | Summer | N/A | Real Madrid CF |
| 13 | GK | (Spain) | Jesús | 26 | EU | Levante | Transfer | Summer | €0.5M | Levante UD |
| 14 | CM | (Spain) | Xabi Alonso | 32 | EU | Bayern Munich (Germany) | Transfer | Summer | €10M | FC Bayern Munich |
| 16 | DM | (Brazil) | Casemiro | 22 | Non-EU | Porto (Portugal) | Loan | Summer | €1.5M | Real Madrid CF |
| 21 | ST | (Spain) | Álvaro Morata | 21 | EU | Juventus (Italy) | Transfer | Summer | €20M | Juventus F.C. |
| 22 | RW | (Argentina) | Ángel Di María | 26 | Non-EU | Manchester United (England) | Transfer | Summer | €75.6M | Manchester United F.C. |
| 25 | GK | (Spain) | Diego López | 32 | EU | Milan (Italy) | Transfer | Summer | Free | A.C. Milan |

Total revenue: €115.1M Net income: ▼€12.4M

Notes

1. Includes €7.5 million received from Zenit Saint Petersburg for the transfer of former Real Madrid player Ezequiel Garay from Benfica on 25 June 2014.

== Pre-season and friendlies ==
=== International Champions Cup ===
==== Group stage ====
| Pos | Team | Pld | W | WP | LP | L | GF | GA | GD | Pts | Qualification |
|---|---|---|---|---|---|---|---|---|---|---|---|
| 1 | (England) Manchester United | 3 | 2 | 1 | 0 | 0 | 6 | 3 | +3 | 8 | Advance to Final |
| 2 | (Italy) Inter Milan | 3 | 1 | 1 | 1 | 0 | 3 | 1 | +2 | 6 | |
| 3 | (Italy) Roma | 3 | 1 | 0 | 0 | 2 | 3 | 5 | −2 | 3 | |
| 4 | (Spain) Real Madrid | 3 | 0 | 0 | 1 | 2 | 2 | 5 | −3 | 1 | |

Source: International Champions Cup
Rules for classification: 1) points; 2) head-to-head result; 3) goal difference; 4) goals scored

| 26 July 2014 1 | Real Madrid | 1–1 (2–3 p) | Internazionale | Berkeley, California, United States |
| 15:00 MDT (UTC−07:00) | Bale 10'; De Tomás (yellow card) 48'; Medrán (yellow card) 56'; Carvajal (yellow card) 71' | Report | Ranocchia (yellow card) 29'; Icardi 68' (pen.); M'Vila (yellow card) 83' | Stadium: California Memorial Stadium; Attendance: 62,583; Referee: Ricardo Salazar (United States) |
| | Penalties |
| | Isco (penalty missed); Vázquez (penalty scored); Nacho (penalty scored); Illarramendi (penalty missed); Mascarell (penalty missed) | | (penalty scored) Vidić; (penalty missed) Nagatomo; (penalty missed) M'Vila; (penalty scored) Juan; (penalty scored) Icardi |

| 29 July 2014 2 | Real Madrid | 0–1 | Roma | Dallas, Texas, United States |
| 20:15 CST (UTC−06:00) | | Report | Totti 58' | Stadium: Cotton Bowl; Attendance: 57,512; Referee: Drew Fischer (Canada) |

| 2 August 2014 3 | Manchester United | 3–1 | Real Madrid | Ann Arbor, Michigan, United States |
| 16:06 EST (UTC−05:00) | Young 21', 37'; Hernández 80' | Report | Bale 27' (pen.); Arbeloa (yellow card) 30'; Isco (yellow card) 68' | Stadium: Michigan Stadium; Attendance: 109,318; Referee: Hilario Grajeda (United States) |

=== Other friendlies ===
| 16 August 2014 Friendly | Real Madrid | 1–2 | Fiorentina | Warsaw, Poland |
| 20:45 CEST (UTC+02:00) | Ronaldo 4' | Report | Gómez 27'; Alonso 69'; Savić (yellow card) 90+2' | Stadium: Stadion Narodowy; Attendance: 47,000; Referee: Daniel Stefański (Poland) |

=== Dubai Challenge Cup ===
| 30 December 2014 Final | Real Madrid | 2–4 | Milan | Dubai, United Arab Emirates |
| 20:00 UAEST (UTC+04:00) | Ronaldo 35'; Kroos (yellow card) 70'; Carvajal (yellow card) 72'; Pepe (yellow card) 72'; Benzema 84' (pen.) | Report | Ménez 24'; El Shaarawy 31', 48'; Pazzini 73' | Stadium: The Sevens Stadium; Attendance: 42,000; Referee: Muhammad Abdullah (United Arab Emirates) |

== Competitions ==
=== Overview ===
| Competition | First match | Last match | Starting round | Final position | Record | | | | | | | |
| Competition | First match | Last match | Starting round | Final position | Pld | W | D | L | GF | GA | GD | Win % |
|---|---|---|---|---|---|---|---|---|---|---|---|---|
| La Liga | 25 August 2014 | 23 May 2015 | Matchday 1 | 2nd | 38 | 30 | 2 | 6 | 118 | 38 | +80 | 78.95 |
| Copa del Rey | 29 October 2014 | 15 January 2015 | Round of 32 | Round of 16 | 4 | 2 | 1 | 1 | 11 | 5 | +6 | 50.00 |
| Champions League | 16 September 2014 | 13 May 2015 | Group stage | Semi-Final | 12 | 8 | 2 | 2 | 24 | 9 | +15 | 66.67 |
| Super Cup | 12 August 2014 | 12 August 2014 | Final | Winners | 1 | 1 | 0 | 0 | 2 | 0 | +2 | 100.00 |
| Club World Cup | 16 December 2014 | 20 December 2014 | Semi-finals | Winners | 2 | 2 | 0 | 0 | 6 | 0 | +6 | 100.00 |
| Total | | | | | 57 | 43 | 5 | 9 | 161 | 52 | +109 | 75.44 |

Last updated: 3 June 2017
Source: Competitions

=== Supercopa de España ===
| 19 August 2014 First leg | Real Madrid | 1–1 | Atlético Madrid | Madrid |
| 23:00 CEST (UTC+02:00) | Alonso (yellow card) 38'; Ramos (yellow card) 61'; Rodríguez 81' | Report | Koke (yellow card) 5'; Siqueira (yellow card) 13'; Suárez (yellow card) 58'; Mandžukić (yellow card) 61'; García (yellow card) 69', (goal) 88' | Stadium: Estadio Santiago Bernabéu; Attendance: 75,897; Referee: Javier Estrada Fernández (Catalonia) |

| 22 August 2014 Second leg | Atlético Madrid | 1–0 (2–1 agg.) | Real Madrid | Madrid |
| 22:30 CEST (UTC+02:00) | Mandžukić 2'; Tiago (yellow card) 18'; Koke (yellow card) 50'; Griezmann (yellow card) 68'; García (yellow card) 74' | Report | Modrić (yellow card) 48' (yellow-red card) 90+1'; Alonso (yellow card) 52'; Isco (yellow card) 78'; Ramos (yellow card) 89'; Ronaldo (yellow card) 90+4' | Stadium: Estadio Vicente Calderón; Attendance: 53,800; Referee: David Fernández Borbalán (Andalusia) |

=== La Liga ===
==== League table ====
| Pos | Team | Pld | W | D | L | GF | GA | GD | Pts | Qualification or relegation |
|---|---|---|---|---|---|---|---|---|---|---|
| 1 | Barcelona (C) | 38 | 30 | 4 | 4 | 110 | 21 | +89 | 94 | Qualification for the Champions League group stage |
| 2 | Real Madrid | 38 | 30 | 2 | 6 | 118 | 38 | +80 | 92 | Qualification for the Champions League group stage |
| 3 | Atlético Madrid | 38 | 23 | 9 | 6 | 67 | 29 | +38 | 78 | Qualification for the Champions League group stage |
| 4 | Valencia | 38 | 22 | 11 | 5 | 70 | 32 | +38 | 77 | Qualification for the Champions League play-off round |
| 5 | Sevilla | 38 | 23 | 7 | 8 | 71 | 45 | +26 | 76 | Qualification for the Champions League group stage (Note: Sevilla qualified for the Champions League group stage by winning the 2014–15 UEFA Europa League. As a result, the fifth-placed spot for the Europa League group stage they earned was vacated without replacement as per UEFA regulations.) |

Source: La Liga
Rules for classification: 1) points; 2) head-to-head points; 3) head-to-head goal difference; 4) goal difference; 5) number of goals scored; 6) fair-play points; 7) playoff match
(C) Champions

==== Results by round ====
| Round | 1 | 2 | 3 | 4 | 5 | 6 | 7 | 8 | 9 | 10 | 11 | 12 | 13 | 14 | 15 | 16 | 17 | 18 | 19 | 20 | 21 | 22 | 23 | 24 | 25 | 26 | 27 | 28 | 29 | 30 | 31 | 32 | 33 | 34 | 35 | 36 | 37 | 38 |
|---|---|---|---|---|---|---|---|---|---|---|---|---|---|---|---|---|---|---|---|---|---|---|---|---|---|---|---|---|---|---|---|---|---|---|---|---|---|---|
| Ground | H | A | H | A | H | A | H | A | H | A | H | A | A | H | A | A | H | A | A | H | H | A | H | A | H | A | H | A | H | A | H | H | A | H | A | H | A | H |
| Result | W | L | L | W | W | W | W | W | W | W | W | W | W | W | W | L | W | W | W | W | W | L | W | W | D | L | W | L | W | W | W | W | W | W | W | D | W | W |
| Position | 3 | 10 | 13 | 7 | 5 | 5 | 4 | 3 | 3 | 1 | 1 | 1 | 1 | 1 | 1 | 1 | 1 | 1 | 1 | 1 | 1 | 1 | 1 | 1 | 1 | 2 | 2 | 2 | 2 | 2 | 2 | 2 | 2 | 2 | 2 | 2 | 2 | 2 |

Updated to match(es) played on 23 May 2015. Source: Matches
A = Away; H = Home; W = Win; D = Draw; L = Loss

==== Matches ====
Win Draw Loss

| 25 August 2014 1 | Real Madrid | 2–0 | Córdoba | Madrid |
| 20:00 CEST (UTC+02:00) | Benzema 30', (yellow card) 72'; Ronaldo 88' | Report | Pinillos (yellow card) 18'; López Garai (yellow card) 59' | Stadium: Estadio Santiago Bernabéu; Attendance: 70,356; Referee: Jesús Gil Manzano (Extremadura) |

| 31 August 2014 2 | Real Sociedad | 4–2 | Real Madrid | San Sebastián |
| 21:00 CEST (UTC+02:00) | Granero (yellow card) 17'; I. Martínez 34'; Zurutuza 42', 64'; Vela 76' | Report | Ramos 6'; Bale 10'; Carvajal (yellow card) 36'; Isco (yellow card) 82' | Stadium: Estadio Anoeta; Attendance: 27,879; Referee: Juan Martínez Munuera (Valencian Community) |

| 13 September 2014 3 | Real Madrid | 1–2 | Atlético Madrid | Madrid |
| 20:00 CEST (UTC+02:00) | Rodríguez (yellow card) 19'; Ronaldo 27' (pen.); Arbeloa (yellow card) 63'; Hernández (yellow card) 67'; Modrić (yellow card) 85' | Report | Tiago 9'; Godín (yellow card) 22'; Siqueira (yellow card) 25'; Mandžukić (yellow card) 41'; Gabi (yellow card) 54'; Turan 77'; Miranda (yellow card) 86'; Suárez (yellow card) 89'; Koke (yellow card) 90+2' | Stadium: Estadio Santiago Bernabéu; Attendance: 85,253; Referee: Antonio Mateu Lahoz (Valencian Community) |

| 20 September 2014 4 | Deportivo La Coruña | 2–8 | Real Madrid | A Coruña |
| 16:00 CEST (UTC+02:00) | Medunjanin 50' (pen.); Sidnei (yellow card) 65'; Toché 84' | Report | Ronaldo 28', 42', 79'; Rodríguez 35'; Ramos (yellow card) 50'; Bale 66', 73'; Hernández 89', 90+1' | Stadium: Estadio Riazor; Attendance: 27,685; Referee: Pedro Jesús Pérez Montero (Andalusia) |

| 23 September 2014 5 | Real Madrid | 5–1 | Elche | Madrid |
| 20:00 CEST (UTC+02:00) | Carvajal (yellow card) 4'; Marcelo (yellow card) 16'; Bale 21'; Ronaldo 27' (pen.), 33', 81' (pen.), 90+1' | Report | Albácar 15' (pen.), (yellow card) 58' | Stadium: Estadio Santiago Bernabéu; Attendance: 63,634; Referee: Carlos Clos Gómez (Aragon) |

| 27 September 2014 6 | Villarreal | 0–2 | Real Madrid | Villarreal |
| 16:00 CEST (UTC+02:00) | | Report | Modrić 33'; Ramos (yellow card) 38'; Ronaldo 39' | Stadium: Estadio El Madrigal; Attendance: 22,146; Referee: Alberto Undiano Mallenco (Navarre) |

| 5 October 2014 7 | Real Madrid | 5–0 | Athletic Bilbao | Madrid |
| 21:00 CEST (UTC+02:00) | Ronaldo 4', 54', 89'; Ramos (yellow card) 28'; Benzema 40', 70' | Report | De Marcos (yellow card) 25'; Balenziaga (yellow card) 34' | Stadium: Estadio Santiago Bernabéu; Attendance: 77,987; Referee: Alejandro José Hernández Hernández (Canary Islands) |

| 18 October 2014 8 | Levante | 0–5 | Real Madrid | Valencia |
| 16:00 CEST (UTC+02:00) | Juanfran (yellow card) 12'; Camarasa (yellow card) 24'; Gavilán (yellow card) 28'; López (yellow card) 45' | Report | Ronaldo 12' (pen.), 62'; Hernández 37'; Rodríguez 67'; Isco 81' | Stadium: Estadi Ciutat de València; Attendance: 23,506; Referee: Ignacio Iglesias Villanueva (Galicia) |

| 25 October 2014 9 | Real Madrid | 3–1 | Barcelona | Madrid |
| 18:00 CET (UTC+01:00) | Ronaldo 35' (pen.), (yellow card) 90+3'; Pepe 50'; Benzema 61'; Carvajal (yellow card) 74' | Report | Neymar 4', (yellow card) 14'; Messi (yellow card) 9'; Piqué (yellow card) 34'; Iniesta (yellow card) 38' | Stadium: Estadio Santiago Bernabéu; Attendance: 85,450; Referee: Jesús Gil Manzano (Extremadura) |

| 1 November 2014 10 | Granada | 0–4 | Real Madrid | Granada |
| 16:00 CET (UTC+01:00) | Eddy (yellow card) 39' | Report | Ronaldo 1'; Rodríguez 32', 87'; Modrić (yellow card) 43'; Benzema 55'; Arbeloa (yellow card) 90+2' | Stadium: Estadio Nuevo Los Cármenes; Attendance: 21,800; Referee: José Luis González González (Castile and León) |

| 8 November 2014 11 | Real Madrid | 5–1 | Rayo Vallecano | Madrid |
| 20:00 CET (UTC+01:00) | Bale 8'; Ramos 41'; Kroos 54'; Benzema 60'; Ronaldo 82' | Report | Bueno 45'; Fatau (yellow card) 45'; Tito (yellow card) 56'; Licá (yellow card) 79'; Quini (yellow card) 90+2' | Stadium: Estadio Santiago Bernabéu; Attendance: 76,842; Referee: Pedro Jesús Pérez Montero (Andalusia) |

| 22 November 2014 12 | Eibar | 0–4 | Real Madrid | Eibar |
| 18:00 CET (UTC+01:00) | Irureta (yellow card) 32'; Arruabarrena (yellow card) 71'; Errasti (yellow card) 81'; Albentosa (yellow card) 82' | Report | Ramos (yellow card) 21'; Rodríguez 22', (yellow card) 42'; Ronaldo 44', 83' (pen.); Benzema 70' | Stadium: Estadio Ipurua Municipal; Attendance: 5,859; Referee: David Fernández Borbalán (Andalusia) |

| 29 November 2014 13 | Málaga | 1–2 | Real Madrid | Málaga |
| 20:00 CET (UTC+01:00) | Darder (yellow card) 30'; Santa Cruz 90+1'; Weligton (yellow card) 90+4' | Report | Benzema 19'; Kroos (yellow card) 43'; Isco (yellow card) 71' (yellow-red card) 86'; Marcelo (yellow card) 80'; Bale 84' | Stadium: Estadio La Rosaleda; Attendance: 29,025; Referee: Iñaki Vicandi Garrido (Basque Country) |

| 6 December 2014 14 | Real Madrid | 3–0 | Celta Vigo | Madrid |
| 20:00 CET (UTC+01:00) | Ronaldo 35' (pen.), 66', 80'; Rodríguez (yellow card) 38'; Carvajal (yellow card) 75'; Arbeloa (yellow card) 79'; Ramos (yellow card) 87' | Report | Cabral (yellow card) 11'; Jonny (yellow card) 35'; Nolito (yellow card) 35'; Hernández (yellow card) 77' | Stadium: Estadio Santiago Bernabéu; Attendance: 80,300; Referee: Alberto Undiano Mallenco (Navarre) |

| 12 December 2014 15 | Almería | 1–4 | Real Madrid | Almería |
| 20:45 CET (UTC+01:00) | Verza (yellow card) 11', (goal) 40'; Dubarbier (yellow card) 30'; Soriano (yellow card) 52'; Vélez (yellow card) 64' | Report | Bale (yellow card) 24', (goal) 41'; Isco 35'; Marcelo (yellow card) 57'; Illarramendi (yellow card) 62'; Ronaldo (yellow card) 76', (goal) 80', 90' | Stadium: Estadio de los Juegos Mediterráneos; Attendance: 13,950; Referee: Alfonso Javier Álvarez Izquierdo (Catalonia) |

| 4 January 2015 17 | Valencia | 2–1 | Real Madrid | Valencia |
| 17:00 CET (UTC+01:00) | Gayà (yellow card) 23'; Pérez (yellow card) 29'; Mustafi (yellow card) 33'; Alcácer (yellow card) 42'; Parejo (yellow card) 43'; Barragán 53'; Orbán (yellow card) 59'; Otamendi 64' | Report | Ronaldo 15' (pen.); Ramos (yellow card) 15'; Isco (yellow card) 39'; Carvajal (yellow card) 63' | Stadium: Estadio Mestalla; Attendance: 50,738; Referee: Jesús Gil Manzano (Extremadura) |

| 10 January 2015 18 | Real Madrid | 3–0 | Espanyol | Madrid |
| 16:00 CET (UTC+01:00) | Rodríguez 11'; Bale 29'; Coentrão (red card) 53'; Ronaldo (yellow card) 53'; Nacho 75' | Report | Fuentes (yellow card) 27'; Sánchez (yellow card) 58'; Arbilla (yellow card) 70'; Montañés (yellow card) 76' | Stadium: Estadio Santiago Bernabéu; Attendance: 74,896; Referee: David Fernández Borbalán (Andalusia) |

| 18 January 2015 19 | Getafe | 0–3 | Real Madrid | Getafe |
| 12:00 CET (UTC+01:00) | Velázquez (yellow card) 31'; Lago (yellow card) 64' | Report | Kroos (yellow card) 34'; Rodríguez (yellow card) 61'; Ronaldo 64', 78'; Bale 68' | Stadium: Coliseum Alfonso Pérez; Attendance: 11,500; Referee: Pedro Jesús Pérez Montero (Andalusia) |

| 24 January 2015 20 | Córdoba | 1–2 | Real Madrid | Córdoba |
| 16:00 CET (UTC+01:00) | Ghilas 4' (pen.); Rossi (yellow card) 58'; Cartabia (yellow card) 60' (yellow-red card) 87' | Report | Ramos (yellow card) 2'; Benzema 26'; Khedira (yellow card) 63'; Carvajal (yellow card) 74'; Ronaldo (red card) 82'; Bale 90' (pen.) | Stadium: Estadio Nuevo Arcángel; Attendance: 21,495; Referee: Alejandro José Hernández Hernández (Canary Islands) |

| 31 January 2015 21 | Real Madrid | 4–1 | Real Sociedad | Madrid |
| 16:00 CET (UTC+01:00) | Rodríguez 3'; Illaramendi (yellow card) 31'; Ramos 38'; Benzema 53', 75'; Marcelo (yellow card) 70'; Khedira (yellow card) 88' | Report | Elustondo 1'; Berchiche (yellow card) 88' | Stadium: Estadio Santiago Bernabéu; Attendance: 71,653; Referee: Alfonso Javier Álvarez Izquierdo (Catalonia) |

| 4 February 2015 16 | Real Madrid | 2–1 | Sevilla | Madrid |
| 20:45 CET (UTC+01:00) | Rodríguez 11'; Jesé 37'; Varane (yellow card) 45'; Marcelo (yellow card) 60'; Isco (yellow card) 86' | Report | Figueiras (yellow card) 41'; Navarro (yellow card) 42'; Mbia (yellow card) 45'; Carriço (yellow card) 66'; Vitolo (yellow card) 71'; Vidal (yellow card) 76'; Aspas 81' | Stadium: Estadio Santiago Bernabéu; Attendance: 67,126; Referee: Ignacio Iglesias Villanueva (Galicia) |
Note: The match was scheduled for 21 December 2014 but was moved back due to Madrid's participation in the 2014 FIFA Club World Cup.

| 7 February 2015 22 | Atlético Madrid | 4–0 | Real Madrid | Madrid |
| 16:00 CET (UTC+01:00) | Tiago 13'; Saúl 19'; Gabi (yellow card) 45'; Turan (yellow card) 49'; García (yellow card) 52'; Godín (yellow card) 54'; Griezmann 66'; Mandžukić (yellow card) 82', (goal) 90' | Report | Kroos (yellow card) 29'; Jesé (yellow card) 85' | Stadium: Estadio Vicente Calderón; Attendance: 52,063; Referee: David Fernández Borbalán (Andalusia) |

| 14 February 2015 23 | Real Madrid | 2–0 | Deportivo La Coruña | Madrid |
| 18:00 CET (UTC+01:00) | Isco 22'; Nacho (yellow card) 47'; Benzema 74'; Arbeloa (yellow card) 77' | Report | Borges (yellow card) 44'; Manuel Pablo (yellow card) 60'; Lopo (yellow card) 82'; Laure (yellow card) 88' | Stadium: Estadio Santiago Bernabéu; Attendance: 73,671; Referee: Javier Estrada Fernández (Catalonia) |

| 22 February 2015 24 | Elche | 0–2 | Real Madrid | Elche |
| 21:00 CET (UTC+01:00) | Albácar (yellow card) 24'; Jonathas (yellow card) 40'; Aarón (yellow card) 52'; Roco (yellow card) 71' | Report | Marcelo (yellow card) 38'; Benzema 55'; Ronaldo 70' | Stadium: Estadio Manuel Martínez Valero; Attendance: 31,512; Referee: Iglesias Villanueva (Galicia) |

| 1 March 2015 25 | Real Madrid | 1–1 | Villarreal | Madrid |
| 21:00 CET (UTC+01:00) | Ronaldo 51' (pen.); Carvajal (yellow card) 76'; Pepe (yellow card) 89' | Report | Gómez (yellow card) 37'; Bailly (yellow card) 51'; Gerard 65'; Costa (yellow card) 70'; Asenjo (yellow card) 79'; Trigueros (yellow card) 87' | Stadium: Estadio Santiago Bernabéu; Attendance: 75,108; Referee: José Luis González González (Castile and León) |

| 7 March 2015 26 | Athletic Bilbao | 1–0 | Real Madrid | Bilbao |
| 18:00 CET (UTC+01:00) | Aduriz 25', (yellow card) 30'; Etxeita (yellow card) 39'; Gurpegui (yellow card) 78' | Report | Kroos (yellow card) 30'; Illarramendi (yellow card) 41'; Isco (yellow card) 74'; Marcelo (yellow card) 86' | Stadium: Estadio San Mamés; Attendance: 48,437; Referee: Alberto Undiano Mallenco (Navarre) |

| 15 March 2015 27 | Real Madrid | 2–0 | Levante | Madrid |
| 21:00 CET (UTC+01:00) | Bale 19', 39'; Modrić (yellow card) 30'; Ramos (yellow card) 85' | Report | | Stadium: Estadio Santiago Bernabéu; Attendance: 64,500; Referee: Pedro Jesús Pérez Montero (Andalusia) |

| 22 March 2015 28 | Barcelona | 2–1 | Real Madrid | Barcelona |
| 21:00 CET (UTC+01:00) | Mathieu 20'; Suárez (yellow card) 28', (goal) 55'; Alba (yellow card) 37'; Mascherano (yellow card) 61'; Iniesta (yellow card) 65'; Alves (yellow card) 71' | Report | Pepe (yellow card) 21'; Ronaldo 32', (yellow card) 37'; Ramos (yellow card) 45'; Carvajal (yellow card) 48'; Modrić (yellow card) 52'; Isco (yellow card) 64' | Stadium: Camp Nou; Attendance: 98,760; Referee: Antonio Mateu Lahoz (Valencian Community) |

| 5 April 2015 29 | Real Madrid | 9–1 | Granada | Madrid |
| 12:00 CEST (UTC+02:00) | Bale 24'; Ronaldo 31', 35', 39', 53', 90'; Benzema 51', 57'; Mainz 82' (o.g.); Arbeloa (yellow card) 87' | Report | Piti (yellow card) 64'; Ibáñez 75'; Murillo (yellow card) 89' | Stadium: Estadio Santiago Bernabéu; Attendance: 71,863; Referee: Jesús Gil Manzano (Extremadura) |

| 8 April 2015 30 | Rayo Vallecano | 0–2 | Real Madrid | Madrid |
| 22:00 CEST (UTC+02:00) | Tito (yellow card) 40'; Nacho (yellow card) 44'; Cobeño (yellow card) 61'; Amaya (yellow card) 63' | Report | Rodríguez (yellow card) 20', (goal) 72'; Ronaldo 69'; Kroos (yellow card) 51'; Bale (yellow card) 52'; Carvajal (yellow card) 54' | Stadium: Campo de Fútbol de Vallecas; Attendance: 13,016; Referee: Mario Melero López (Andalusia) |
Note: Cristiano Ronaldo was given a yellow card for simulation which was later rescinded by the Royal Spanish Football Federation on appeal.

| 11 April 2015 31 | Real Madrid | 3–0 | Eibar | Madrid |
| 16:00 CEST (UTC+02:00) | Ronaldo 20'; Hernández 32'; Jesé 82' | Report | Vilà (yellow card) 40'; Arruabarrena (yellow card) 48'; Boateng (yellow card) 79' | Stadium: Estadio Santiago Bernabéu; Attendance: 73,965; Referee: Alejandro José Hernández Hernández (Canary Islands) |

| 18 April 2015 32 | Real Madrid | 3–1 | Málaga | Madrid |
| 20:00 CEST (UTC+02:00) | Ramos 25'; Arbeloa (yellow card) 61'; Rodríguez 68'; Kroos (yellow card) 81'; Ronaldo 90+3' | Report | Juanmi 70'; Sánchez (yellow card) 77'; Tissone (yellow card) 87' | Stadium: Estadio Santiago Bernabéu; Attendance: 78,354; Referee: Iñaki Vicandi Garrido (Basque Country) |

| 26 April 2015 33 | Celta Vigo | 2–4 | Real Madrid | Vigo |
| 21:00 CEST (UTC+02:00) | Nolito 10'; Mina 27'; Orellana (yellow card) 50'; Jonny (yellow card) 52'; Krohn-Dehli (yellow card) 89' | Report | Kroos 17'; Hernández 23', 70'; Rodríguez 42'; Ramos (yellow card) 83'; Carvajal (yellow card) 89' | Stadium: Balaídos; Attendance: 25,274; Referee: Pedro Jesús Pérez Montero (Andalusia) |

| 29 April 2015 34 | Real Madrid | 3–0 | Almería | Madrid |
| 20:00 CEST (UTC+02:00) | Rodríguez 45'; M. Dos Santos 48' (o.g.); Coentrão (yellow card) 76'; Arbeloa 85' | Report | | Stadium: Estadio Santiago Bernabéu; Attendance: 63,813; Referee: Iglesias Villanueva (Galicia) |

| 2 May 2015 35 | Sevilla | 2–3 | Real Madrid | Seville |
| 20:00 CEST (UTC+02:00) | Bacca 45+1' (pen.); Reyes (yellow card) 67'; Iborra 80'; Trémoulinas (yellow card) 87'; Carriço (yellow card) 90+1'; Vidal (yellow card) 90+3' | Report | Ronaldo 35', 38', 68'; Ramos (yellow card) 45+1'; Carvajal (yellow card) 51' | Stadium: Estadio Ramón Sánchez Pizjuán; Attendance: 39,689; Referee: José Luis González González (Castile and León) |

| 9 May 2015 36 | Real Madrid | 2–2 | Valencia | Madrid |
| 20:00 CEST (UTC+02:00) | Arbeloa (yellow card) 25'; Pepe (yellow card) 48', (goal) 57'; Ramos (yellow card) 58'; Isco 83' | Report | Gayà (yellow card) 16'; Alcácer 20'; Fuego 25'; Otamendi (yellow card) 58'; Gomes (yellow card) 73'; Parejo (yellow card) 90+1' | Stadium: Estadio Santiago Bernabéu; Attendance: 79,897; Referee: Carlos Clos Gómez (Aragon) |

| 17 May 2015 37 | Espanyol | 1–4 | Real Madrid | Cornellà de Llobregat |
| 19:00 CEST (UTC+02:00) | Caicedo (yellow card) 17'; Sánchez (yellow card) 54'; Stuani 74' | Report | Pepe (yellow card) 22'; Ronaldo 58', 84', 90'; Carvajal (yellow card) 67'; Marcelo (yellow card) 73', (goal) 80' | Stadium: Estadi Cornellà-El Prat; Attendance: 30,180; Referee: Juan Martínez Munuera (Valencian Community) |

| 23 May 2015 38 | Real Madrid | 7–3 | Getafe | Madrid |
| 20:30 CEST (UTC+02:00) | Ronaldo 12', 32', 34' (pen.); Jesé (yellow card) 45', (goal) 72'; Hernández 46'; Rodríguez 52'; Marcelo (yellow card) 82', (goal) 89' | Report | Escudero 23'; Castro 25'; Lacen 43', (yellow card) 80'; Alexis (yellow card) 80' | Stadium: Estadio Santiago Bernabéu; Attendance: 63,769; Referee: José Antonio Teixeira Vitienes (Cantabria) |

=== Copa del Rey ===
==== Round of 32 ====
| 29 October 2014 First leg | UE Cornellà | 1–4 | Real Madrid | Cornellà de Llobregat |
| 20:00 CET (UTC+01:00) | Muñoz 19'; Marín (yellow card) 87' | Report | Varane 11', 35', (yellow card) 63'; Hernández 54'; Marcelo 74' | Stadium: Estadi Cornellà-El Prat; Attendance: 26,000; Referee: Jaime Latre (Aragon) |

| 2 December 2014 Second leg | Real Madrid | 5–0 (9–1 agg.) | UE Cornellà | Madrid |
| 20:00 CET (UTC+01:00) | Rodríguez 14', 33'; Isco 33'; Illarramendi (yellow card) 37'; López 59' (o.g.); Muñoz (yellow card) 72'; Jesé 78' | Report | | Stadium: Estadio Santiago Bernabéu; Attendance: 46,200; Referee: José Luis González González (Castile and León) |

==== Round of 16 ====
| 7 January 2015 First leg | Atlético Madrid | 2–0 | Real Madrid | Madrid |
| 21:00 CET (UTC+01:00) | García 57' (pen.), (yellow card) 74'; Gámez (yellow card) 61'; Griezmann (yellow card) 64'; Gabi (yellow card) 73'; Giménez 77'; Godín (yellow card) 87'; Mandžukić (yellow card) 87' | Report | Marcelo (yellow card) 27'; Khedira (yellow card) 31'; Ramos (yellow card) 57'; Carvajal (yellow card) 89' | Stadium: Estadio Vicente Calderón; Attendance: 46,800; Referee: Carlos Clos Gómez (Aragon) |

| 15 January 2015 Second leg | Real Madrid | 2–2 (2–4 agg.) | Atlético Madrid | Madrid |
| 20:00 CET (UTC+01:00) | Ramos 19', (yellow card) 55'; Ronaldo 55'; Marcelo (yellow card) 82'; Carvajal (yellow card) 85'; Isco (yellow card) 89' | Report | Torres 1', 46'; García (yellow card) 27'; Tiago (yellow card) 48'; Godín (yellow card) 51'; Koke (yellow card) 83' | Stadium: Estadio Santiago Bernabéu; Attendance: 81,000; Referee: Antonio Mateu Lahoz (Valencian Community) |

=== UEFA Champions League ===
==== Group stage ====
| Pos | Team | Pld | W | D | L | GF | GA | GD | Pts | Qualification | RMA | BSL | LIV | LUD |
|---|---|---|---|---|---|---|---|---|---|---|---|---|---|---|
| 1 | (Spain) Real Madrid | 6 | 6 | 0 | 0 | 16 | 2 | +14 | 18 | Advance to knockout phase | — | 5–1 | 1–0 | 4–0 |
| 2 | (Switzerland) Basel | 6 | 2 | 1 | 3 | 7 | 8 | −1 | 7 | Advance to knockout phase | 0–1 | — | 1–0 | 4–0 |
| 3 | (England) Liverpool | 6 | 1 | 2 | 3 | 5 | 9 | −4 | 5 | Transfer to Europa League | 0–3 | 1–1 | — | 2–1 |
| 4 | (Bulgaria) Ludogorets Razgrad | 6 | 1 | 1 | 4 | 5 | 14 | −9 | 4 | | 1–2 | 1–0 | 2–2 | — |

Source: UEFA
Rules for classification: Group stage tiebreakers

| 16 September 2014 1 | Real Madrid (Spain) | 5–1 | (Switzerland) Basel | Madrid, Spain |
| 20:45 CEST (UTC+02:00) | Suchý 15' (o.g.); Bale 29'; Ronaldo 32'; Rodríguez 35'; Benzema 80'; Pepe (yellow card) 85' | Report | González 36'; Elneny (yellow card) 55'; Samuel (yellow card) 60'; Xhaka (yellow card) 90+1' | Stadium: Estadio Santiago Bernabéu; Attendance: 65,364; Referee: Damir Skomina (Slovenia); Man of the Match: Luka Modrić |

| 1 October 2014 2 | Ludogorets Razgrad (Bulgaria) | 1–2 | (Spain) Real Madrid | Sofia, Bulgaria |
| 20:45 CEST (UTC+02:00) | Marcelinho 7'; Minev (yellow card) 10'; Dyakov (yellow card) 24'; Abalo (yellow card) 56'; Espinho (yellow card) 62'; Anciet (yellow card) 87' | Report | Ronaldo 23' (pen.); Ramos (yellow card) 73'; Benzema 78' | Stadium: Vasil Levski National Stadium; Attendance: 41,484; Referee: Craig Thomson (Scotland); Man of the Match: Karim Benzema |

| 22 October 2014 3 | Liverpool (England) | 0–3 | (Spain) Real Madrid | Liverpool, England |
| 20:45 CEST (UTC+02:00) | | Report | Ronaldo 22'; Benzema 31', 40'; Kroos (yellow card) 35' | Stadium: Anfield; Attendance: 43,521; Referee: Nicola Rizzoli (Italy); Man of the Match: Karim Benzema |

| 4 November 2014 4 | Real Madrid (Spain) | 1–0 | (England) Liverpool | Madrid, Spain |
| 20:45 CET (UTC+01:00) | Benzema 28'; Rodríguez (yellow card) 53'; Ramos (yellow card) 60'; Marcelo (yellow card) 76' | Report | Škrtel (yellow card) 47'; Moreno (yellow card) 85' | Stadium: Estadio Santiago Bernabéu; Attendance: 79,283; Referee: Viktor Kassai (Hungary); Man of the Match: Karim Benzema |

| 26 November 2014 5 | Basel (Switzerland) | 0–1 | (Spain) Real Madrid | Basel, Switzerland |
| 20:45 CET (UTC+01:00) | Degen (yellow card) 44'; Suchý (yellow card) 53'; Schär (yellow card) 80' | Report | Ronaldo 34'; Ramos (yellow card) 43'; Coentrão (yellow card) 48' | Stadium: St. Jakob-Park; Attendance: 36,000; Referee: Milorad Mažić (Serbia); Man of the Match: Gareth Bale |

| 9 December 2014 6 | Real Madrid (Spain) | 4–0 | (Bulgaria) Ludogorets Razgrad | Madrid, Spain |
| 20:45 CET (UTC+01:00) | Ronaldo 21' (pen.); Bale 37'; Arbeloa 81'; Marcelo (yellow card) 86'; Medrán 87' | Report | Marcelinho (red card) 20' | Stadium: Estadio Santiago Bernabéu; Attendance: 58,393; Referee: Clément Turpin (France); Man of the Match: Álvaro Arbeloa |

==== Knockout phase ====
===== Round of 16 =====
| 18 February 2015 First leg | Schalke 04 (Germany) | 0–2 | (Spain) Real Madrid | Gelsenkirchen, Germany |
| 20:45 CET (UTC+01:00) | Boateng (yellow card) 35'; Neustädter (yellow card) 45+2'; Kirchhoff (yellow card) 63' | Report | Kroos (yellow card) 9'; Ronaldo 27'; Marcelo 78' | Stadium: Veltins-Arena; Attendance: 54,442; Referee: Martin Atkinson (England); Man of the Match: Cristiano Ronaldo |

| 10 March 2015 Second leg | Real Madrid (Spain) | 3–4 (5–4 agg.) | (Germany) Schalke 04 | Madrid, Spain |
| 20:45 CET (UTC+01:00) | Ronaldo 25', 45', (yellow card) 31'; Benzema 53'; Coentrão (yellow card) 55' | Report | Fuchs 20'; Huntelaar 40', 84'; Sané 57'; Neustädter (yellow card) 90+4' | Stadium: Estadio Santiago Bernabéu; Attendance: 69,986; Referee: Damir Skomina (Slovenia); Man of the Match: Klaas-Jan Huntelaar |

===== Quarter-finals =====
| 14 April 2015 First leg | Atlético Madrid (Spain) | 0–0 | (Spain) Real Madrid | Madrid, Spain |
| 20:45 CEST (UTC+02:00) | Mandžukić (yellow card) 55'; García (yellow card) 80'; Suárez (yellow card) 85' | Report | Ramos (yellow card) 80'; Marcelo (yellow card) 89' | Stadium: Estadio Vicente Calderón; Attendance: 52,553; Referee: Milorad Mažić (Serbia); Man of the Match: Jan Oblak |

| 22 April 2015 Second leg | Real Madrid (Spain) | 1–0 (1–0 agg.) | (Spain) Atlético Madrid | Madrid, Spain |
| 20:45 CEST (UTC+02:00) | Pepe (yellow card) 74'; Hernández 88'; Arbeloa (yellow card) 90+3' | Report | Turan (yellow card) 31' (yellow-red card) 76'; García (yellow card) 74'; Koke (yellow card) 90+4' | Stadium: Estadio Santiago Bernabéu; Attendance: 78,300; Referee: Felix Brych (Germany); Man of the Match: Javier Hernández |

===== Semi-finals =====
| 5 May 2015 First leg | Juventus (Italy) | 2–1 | (Spain) Real Madrid | Turin, Italy |
| 20:45 CEST (UTC+02:00) | Bonucci (yellow card) 5'; Morata 8'; Tevez (yellow card) 46', (goal) 58' (pen.); Vidal (yellow card) 56'; Chiellini (yellow card) 90+3' | Report | Ronaldo 27'; Marcelo (yellow card) 57'; Carvajal (yellow card) 75'; Rodríguez (yellow card) 85' | Stadium: Juventus Stadium; Attendance: 41,011; Referee: Martin Atkinson (England); Man of the Match: Carlos Tevez |

| 13 May 2015 Second leg | Real Madrid (Spain) | 1–1 (2–3 agg.) | (Italy) Juventus | Madrid, Spain |
| 20:45 CEST (UTC+02:00) | Ronaldo 23' (pen.); Isco (yellow card) 32'; Rodríguez (yellow card) 44' | Report | Morata 57'; Tevez (yellow card) 69'; Lichtsteiner (yellow card) 76' | Stadium: Estadio Santiago Bernabéu; Attendance: 78,153; Referee: Jonas Eriksson (Sweden); Man of the Match: Gianluigi Buffon |

=== UEFA Super Cup ===
| 12 August 2014 Final | Real Madrid (Spain) | 2–0 | (Spain) Sevilla | Cardiff, Wales |
| 19:45 BST (UTC+01:00) | Ronaldo 30', 49'; Carvajal (yellow card) 45'; Kroos (yellow card) 53' | Report | Vitolo (yellow card) 42'; Navarro (yellow card) 66' | Stadium: Cardiff City Stadium; Attendance: 30,854; Referee: Mark Clattenburg (England) |

=== FIFA Club World Cup ===
| 16 December 2014 Semi-finals | Cruz Azul (Mexico) | 0–4 | (Spain) Real Madrid | Marrakesh, Morocco |
| 19:30 UTC±0 | | Report | Ramos 15', (yellow card) 39'; Benzema 36'; Bale 50'; Isco 72' | Stadium: Stade de Marrakech; Attendance: 34,862; Referee: Enrique Osses (Chile) |

| 20 December 2014 Final | Real Madrid (Spain) | 2–0 | (Argentina) San Lorenzo | Marrakesh, Morocco |
| 19:30 UTC±0 | Ramos (yellow card) 22', (goal) 37'; Carvajal (yellow card) 30'; Bale 51' | Report | Ortigoza (yellow card) 12'; Barrientos (yellow card) 16'; Buffarini (yellow card) 55'; Kannemann (yellow card) 85' | Stadium: Stade de Marrakech; Attendance: 38,345; Referee: Walter López (Guatemala) |

== Statistics ==
=== Squad statistics ===
Updated as of 23 May 2015.

| No. | Pos | Nat | Player | Total | | La Liga | | UEFA CL | | Cup | | Other^{1} | |
| No. | Pos | Nat | Player | Apps | Goals | Apps | Goals | Apps | Goals | Apps | Goals | Apps | Goals |
|---|---|---|---|---|---|---|---|---|---|---|---|---|---|
| 1 | GK | (Spain) ESP | Iker Casillas | 47 | 0 | 32 | 0 | 10 | 0 | 0 | 0 | 5 | 0 |
| 15 | DF | (Spain) ESP | Dani Carvajal | 42 | 0 | 25+5 | 0 | 5 | 0 | 3 | 0 | 4 | 0 |
| 3 | DF | (Portugal) POR | Pepe | 38 | 2 | 25+2 | 2 | 6 | 0 | 1 | 0 | 4 | 0 |
| 4 | DF | (Spain) ESP | Sergio Ramos | 42 | 7 | 27 | 4 | 8 | 0 | 2 | 1 | 5 | 2 |
| 12 | DF | (Brazil) BRA | Marcelo | 53 | 4 | 33+1 | 2 | 11 | 1 | 3 | 1 | 5 | 0 |
| 8 | MF | (Germany) GER | Toni Kroos | 55 | 2 | 36 | 2 | 12 | 0 | 2 | 0 | 5 | 0 |
| 10 | MF | (Colombia) COL | James Rodríguez | 46 | 17 | 29 | 13 | 9 | 1 | 4 | 2 | 4 | 1 |
| 23 | MF | (Spain) ESP | Isco | 53 | 6 | 26+8 | 4 | 11 | 0 | 4 | 1 | 4 | 1 |
| 7 | FW | (Portugal) POR | Cristiano Ronaldo | 54 | 61 | 35 | 48 | 12 | 10 | 2 | 1 | 5 | 2 |
| 9 | FW | (France) FRA | Karim Benzema | 46 | 22 | 29 | 15 | 9 | 6 | 3 | 0 | 5 | 1 |
| 11 | FW | (Wales) WAL | Gareth Bale | 48 | 17 | 30+1 | 13 | 10 | 2 | 2 | 0 | 5 | 2 |
| 13 | GK | (Costa Rica) CRC | Keylor Navas | 11 | 0 | 6 | 0 | 2 | 0 | 3 | 0 | 0 | 0 |
| 2 | DF | (France) FRA | Raphaël Varane | 45 | 2 | 21+6 | 0 | 12 | 0 | 4 | 2 | 2 | 0 |
| 19 | MF | (Croatia) CRO | Luka Modrić | 25 | 1 | 16 | 1 | 6 | 0 | 0 | 0 | 3 | 0 |
| 17 | DF | (Spain) ESP | Álvaro Arbeloa | 35 | 2 | 12+10 | 1 | 9 | 1 | 3 | 0 | 1 | 0 |
| 24 | MF | (Spain) ESP | Asier Illarramendi | 41 | 0 | 10+20 | 0 | 7 | 0 | 2 | 0 | 2 | 0 |
| 14 | FW | (Mexico) MEX | Javier Hernández | 33 | 9 | 7+16 | 7 | 8 | 1 | 2 | 1 | 0 | 0 |
| 18 | DF | (Spain) ESP | Nacho | 22 | 1 | 5+9 | 1 | 6 | 0 | 2 | 0 | 0 | 0 |
| 5 | DF | (Portugal) POR | Fábio Coentrão | 17 | 0 | 5+4 | 0 | 4 | 0 | 1 | 0 | 3 | 0 |
| 6 | MF | (Germany) GER | Sami Khedira | 17 | 0 | 3+8 | 0 | 2 | 0 | 3 | 0 | 1 | 0 |
| 16 | MF | (Brazil) BRA | Lucas Silva | 9 | 0 | 3+5 | 0 | 1 | 0 | 0 | 0 | 0 | 0 |
| 20 | FW | (Spain) ESP | Jesé | 23 | 4 | 3+13 | 3 | 3 | 0 | 3 | 1 | 1 | 0 |
| 25 | GK | (Spain) ESP | Fernando Pacheco | 1 | 0 | 0 | 0 | 0 | 0 | 1 | 0 | 0 | 0 |
| 26 | MF | (Spain) ESP | Álvaro Medrán | 4 | 1 | 0+2 | 0 | 1 | 1 | 1 | 0 | 0 | 0 |
| 27 | FW | (Spain) ESP | Raúl de Tomás | 1 | 0 | 0 | 0 | 0 | 0 | 1 | 0 | 0 | 0 |
| 34 | DF | (Spain) ESP | Diego Llorente | 1 | 0 | 0 | 0 | 0 | 0 | 1 | 0 | 0 | 0 |
| 37 | MF | (Spain) ESP | Javier Muñoz | 1 | 0 | 0 | 0 | 0 | 0 | 1 | 0 | 0 | 0 |
| 41 | MF | (Norway) NOR | Martin Ødegaard | 1 | 0 | 0+1 | 0 | 0 | 0 | 0 | 0 | 0 | 0 |
| | MF | (Argentina) ARG | Ángel Di María † | 1 | 0 | 0 | 0 | 0 | 0 | 0 | 0 | 1 | 0 |
| | MF | (Spain) ESP | Xabi Alonso † | 2 | 0 | 0 | 0 | 0 | 0 | 0 | 0 | 2 | 0 |

^{1} Includes 2014 Supercopa de España, 2014 UEFA Super Cup and 2014 FIFA Club World Cup.

† denotes players that left the club during the season.

=== Goals ===
Updated as of 23 May 2015.

| Rank | Player | Position | La Liga | UEFA CL | Copa | Other^{1} | Total |
|---|---|---|---|---|---|---|---|
| 1 | (Portugal) Cristiano Ronaldo | LW | 48 | 10 | 1 | 2 | 61 |
| 2 | (France) Karim Benzema | FW | 15 | 6 | 0 | 1 | 22 |
| 3 | (Wales) Gareth Bale | RW | 13 | 2 | 0 | 2 | 17 |
| 3 | (Colombia) James Rodríguez | AM | 13 | 1 | 2 | 1 | 17 |
| 5 | (Mexico) Javier Hernández | FW | 7 | 1 | 1 | 0 | 9 |
| 6 | (Spain) Sergio Ramos | CB | 4 | 0 | 1 | 2 | 7 |
| 7 | (Spain) Isco | AM | 4 | 0 | 1 | 1 | 6 |
| 8 | (Spain) Jesé | FW | 3 | 0 | 1 | 0 | 4 |
| 8 | (Brazil) Marcelo | LB | 2 | 1 | 1 | 0 | 4 |
| 10 | (Spain) Álvaro Arbeloa | RB | 1 | 1 | 0 | 0 | 2 |
| 10 | (Germany) Toni Kroos | CM | 2 | 0 | 0 | 0 | 2 |
| 10 | (Portugal) Pepe | CB | 2 | 0 | 0 | 0 | 2 |
| 10 | (France) Raphaël Varane | CB | 0 | 0 | 2 | 0 | 2 |
| 14 | (Spain) Álvaro Medrán | CM | 0 | 1 | 0 | 0 | 1 |
| 14 | (Croatia) Luka Modrić | CM | 1 | 0 | 0 | 0 | 1 |
| 14 | (Spain) Nacho | CB | 1 | 0 | 0 | 0 | 1 |
| Own goals | | | 2 | 1 | 1 | 0 | 4 |
| Total | | | 118 | 24 | 11 | 9 | 162 |

^{1} Includes 2014 Supercopa de España, 2014 UEFA Super Cup and 2014 FIFA Club World Cup.

=== Disciplinary record ===
| N | P | Nat. | Name | La Liga | | | UEFA CL | | | Cups^{1} | | | Total | | | Notes |
| N | P | Nat. | Name | Yellow card | Second yellow card | Red card | Yellow card | Second yellow card | Red card | Yellow card | Second yellow card | Red card | Yellow card | Second yellow card | Red card | Notes |
| 4 | DF | (Spain) | Sergio Ramos | 12 | | | 4 | | | 6 | | | 22 | | | |
| 15 | DF | (Spain) | Dani Carvajal | 12 | | | 1 | | | 4 | | | 17 | | | |
| 12 | DF | (Brazil) | Marcelo | 7 | | | 4 | | | 1 | | | 12 | | | |
| 8 | MF | (Germany) | Toni Kroos | 6 | | | 2 | | | 1 | | | 9 | | | |
| 23 | MF | (Spain) | Isco | 5 | 1 | | 1 | | | 2 | | | 8 | 1 | | |
| 10 | MF | (Colombia) | James Rodríguez | 5 | | | 3 | | | | | | 8 | | | |
| 17 | DF | (Spain) | Álvaro Arbeloa | 7 | | | 1 | | | | | | 8 | | | |
| 7 | FW | (Portugal) | Cristiano Ronaldo | 4 | | 1 | 1 | | | 1 | | | 6 | | 1 | |
| 3 | DF | (Portugal) | Pepe | 3 | | | 2 | | | | | | 5 | | | |
| 19 | MF | (Croatia) | Luka Modrić | 4 | | | | | | | 1 | | 4 | 1 | | |
| 24 | MF | (Spain) | Asier Illarramendi | 3 | | | | | | 1 | | | 4 | | | |
| 5 | DF | (Portugal) | Fábio Coentrão | 1 | | 1 | 2 | | | | | | 3 | | 1 | |
| 6 | MF | (Germany) | Sami Khedira | 2 | | | | | | 1 | | | 3 | | | |
| 2 | DF | (France) | Raphaël Varane | 1 | | | | | | 1 | | | 2 | | | |
| 11 | FW | (Wales) | Gareth Bale | 2 | | | | | | | | | 2 | | | |
| 14 | FW | (Mexico) | Javier Hernández | 2 | | | | | | | | | 2 | | | |
| 20 | FW | (Spain) | Jesé | 2 | | | | | | | | | 2 | | | |
| 9 | FW | (France) | Karim Benzema | 1 | | | | | | | | | 1 | | | |
| 18 | DF | (Spain) | Nacho | 1 | | | | | | | | | 1 | | | |
| 37 | MF | (Spain) | Javier Muñoz | | | | | | | 1 | | | 1 | | | |

Last updated: 23 May 2015
Source: Matches
Ordered by (red card) , (second yellow card) and (yellow card)
(yellow card) = Number of bookings; (second yellow card) = Number of sending offs after a second yellow card; (red card) = Number of sending offs by a direct red card.

^{1} Includes 2014–15 Copa del Rey, 2014 Supercopa de España, 2014 UEFA Super Cup and 2014 FIFA Club World Cup.
