= 2014 Supercopa de España =

Real Madrid	Atlético Madrid
Copa del Rey	La Liga
1	2
- on aggregate

First leg
Real Madrid	Atlético Madrid
1	1
- Date: 19 August 2014
- Venue: Santiago Bernabéu, Madrid
- Referee: Xavier Estrada Fernández
- Attendance: 75,897

Second leg
Atlético Madrid	Real Madrid
1	0
- Date: 22 August 2014
- Venue: Vicente Calderón, Madrid
- Referee: David Fernández Borbalán
- Attendance: 54,000

The 2014 Supercopa de España was a two-legged football match-up played in August 2014 between the champions of 2013–14 La Liga, Atlético Madrid, and the winners of the 2013–14 Copa del Rey, Real Madrid. The first leg ended 1–1. Atlético won the trophy for the first time since 1985 after beating Real Madrid 1–0 in the second leg. This was the first time that the Supercopa de España featured the Madrid derby; however, the two had previously met in the 2013 Copa del Rey final. For the first time since 2008, the competition did not feature Barcelona.

== Match details ==
=== First leg ===
The opening goal came in the 81st minute when Dani Carvajal crossed from the right for Karim Benzema, whose shot was blocked with the ball falling to substitute James Rodríguez, who found the back of the net with his right foot from seven yards out, his first goal for Real Madrid. Atletico equalized with two minutes to play when Raúl García poked home from two yards with the heel of his right foot after a corner from Koke on the left, which was missed by the Real Madrid defence.

19 August 2014
23:00 CEST

Real Madrid	1–1	Atlético Madrid
Rodríguez 81'	Report	García 88'

Santiago Bernabéu, Madrid
Attendance: 75,897
Referee: Javier Estrada Fernández (Catalonia)

Real Madrid	Atlético Madrid

GK	1	(Spain) Iker Casillas (c)
RB	15	(Spain) Dani Carvajal
CB	3	(Portugal) Pepe
CB	4	(Spain) Sergio Ramos	(yellow card) 61'
LB	12	(Brazil) Marcelo
CM	19	(Croatia) Luka Modrić		(substituted off) 78'
CM	14	(Spain) Xabi Alonso	(yellow card) 38'
RW	11	(Wales) Gareth Bale
AM	8	(Germany) Toni Kroos
LW	7	(Portugal) Cristiano Ronaldo
CF	9	(France) Karim Benzema		(substituted off) 46'
Substitutes:
GK	13	(Costa Rica) Keylor Navas
DF	2	(France) Raphaël Varane
DF	5	(Portugal) Fábio Coentrão
DF	17	(Spain) Álvaro Arbeloa
MF	10	(Colombia) James Rodríguez		(substituted on) 46'
MF	23	(Spain) Isco
MF	22	(Argentina) Ángel Di María		(substituted on) 78'
Manager:
(Italy) Carlo Ancelotti

GK	1	(Spain) Miguel Ángel Moyá
RB	20	(Spain) Juanfran
CB	23	(Brazil) Miranda
CB	2	(Uruguay) Diego Godín
LB	3	(Brazil) Guilherme Siqueira	(yellow card) 13'	(substituted off) 64'
RM	26	(Spain) Saúl		(substituted off) 57'
CM	4	(Spain) Mario Suárez	(yellow card) 58'
CM	14	(Spain) Gabi (c)
LM	6	(Spain) Koke	(yellow card) 5'
CF	8	(Spain) Raúl García	(yellow card) 69'
CF	9	(Croatia) Mario Mandžukić	(yellow card) 61'	(substituted off) 78'
Substitutes:
GK	13	(Slovenia) Jan Oblak
DF	24	(Uruguay) José Giménez
DF	15	(Argentina) Cristian Ansaldi		(substituted on) 64'
MF	5	(Portugal) Tiago
MF	7	(France) Antoine Griezmann		(substituted on) 57'
MF	21	(Uruguay) Cristian Rodríguez
FW	11	(Mexico) Raúl Jiménez		(substituted on) 78'
Manager:
(Argentina) Diego Simeone

=== Second leg ===
Mario Mandžukić scored the only goal of the game after two minutes, converting with a low shot from just inside the penalty area.

Atlético Madrid coach Diego Simeone was sent off after 26 minutes when he patted the referee's assistant on the back of the head.

22 August 2014
22:30 CEST

Atlético Madrid	1–0	Real Madrid
Mandžukić 2'	Report

Vicente Calderón, Madrid
Attendance: 54,000
Referee: David Fernández Borbalán (Andalusia)

Atlético Madrid	Real Madrid

GK	1	(Spain) Miguel Ángel Moyá
RB	20	(Spain) Juanfran
CB	23	(Brazil) Miranda
CB	2	(Uruguay) Diego Godín
LB	3	(Brazil) Guilherme Siqueira
CM	5	(Portugal) Tiago	(yellow card) 18'
CM	14	(Spain) Gabi (c)
RM	8	(Spain) Raúl García	(yellow card) 74'	(substituted off) 90'
AM	7	(France) Antoine Griezmann	(yellow card) 68'	(substituted off) 73'
LM	6	(Spain) Koke	(yellow card) 50'
CF	9	(Croatia) Mario Mandžukić		(substituted off) 84'
Substitutes:
GK	13	(Slovenia) Jan Oblak
DF	24	(Uruguay) José Giménez
DF	15	(Argentina) Cristian Ansaldi
MF	4	(Spain) Mario Suárez
MF	21	(Uruguay) Cristian Rodríguez		(substituted on) 84'
MF	26	(Spain) Saúl		(substituted on) 90'
FW	11	(Mexico) Raúl Jiménez		(substituted on) 73'
Manager:
(Argentina) Diego Simeone			(red card) 26'

GK	1	(Spain) Iker Casillas (c)
RB	15	(Spain) Dani Carvajal
CB	2	(France) Raphaël Varane
CB	4	(Spain) Sergio Ramos	(yellow card) 89'
LB	5	(Portugal) Fábio Coentrão		(substituted off) 70'
CM	19	(Croatia) Luka Modrić	(yellow card) 48' (yellow-red card) 90+1'
CM	14	(Spain) Xabi Alonso	(yellow card) 52'
RW	11	(Wales) Gareth Bale		(substituted off) 46'
AM	8	(Germany) Toni Kroos
LW	10	(Colombia) James Rodríguez
CF	9	(France) Karim Benzema		(substituted off) 65'
Substitutes:
GK	13	(Costa Rica) Keylor Navas
DF	3	(Portugal) Pepe
DF	12	(Brazil) Marcelo		(substituted on) 70'
DF	17	(Spain) Álvaro Arbeloa
MF	23	(Spain) Isco	(yellow card) 78'	(substituted on) 65'
MF	24	(Spain) Asier Illarramendi
FW	7	(Portugal) Cristiano Ronaldo	(yellow card) 90+4'	(substituted on) 46'
Manager:
(Italy) Carlo Ancelotti

== See also ==
- 2014–15 La Liga
- 2014–15 Copa del Rey
- 2014–15 Atlético Madrid season
- 2014–15 Real Madrid CF season
- Madrid derby
