= Álvaro Arbeloa =

Spanish football manager and player (born 1983)

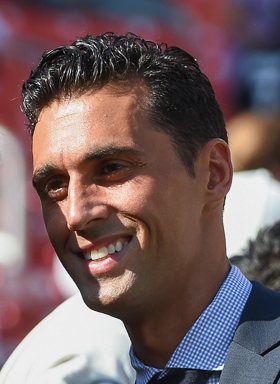
- Arbeloa in 2018

Personal information
- Full name: Álvaro Arbeloa Coca
- Date of birth: 17 January 1983 (age 43)
- Place of birth: Salamanca, Spain
- Height: 1.84 m (6 ft 0 in)
- Position: Full-back

Team information
- Current team: Fulham (head coach)

Youth career
- 1995–2001: Zaragoza
- 2001–2002: Real Madrid

Senior career*
Years	Team	Apps	(Gls)
2002–2003	Real Madrid C	16	(0)
2003–2006	Real Madrid B	84	(0)
2004–2005	Real Madrid	2	(0)
2006–2007	Deportivo La Coruña	20	(0)
2007–2009	Liverpool	66	(2)
2009–2016	Real Madrid	153	(3)
2016–2017	West Ham United	3	(0)
Total		344	(5)

International career
2001	Spain U17	1	(0)
2001	Spain U19	4	(0)
2005	Spain U21	1	(0)
2008–2013	Spain	56	(0)

Managerial career
- 2025–2026: Real Madrid B
- 2026: Real Madrid
- 2026–: Fulham
Medal record
Men's football
Representing Spain
FIFA World Cup
Winner	2010 South Africa
UEFA European Championship
Winner	2008 Austria-Switzerland
Winner	2012 Poland-Ukraine
- * Club domestic league appearances and goals

Álvaro Arbeloa Coca (Spanish pronunciation: [ˈalβaɾo aɾβeˈloa ˈkoka]; born 17 January 1983) is a Spanish professional football manager and former footballer who is the head coach of Premier League club Fulham. He predominantly played as a right-back, and occasionally on the left side.

He started his career with Real Madrid, playing mostly with the reserves. In 2006 he moved to Deportivo, joining Liverpool after half a season and going on to appear in 98 official matches over three Premier League seasons. In 2009, he returned to Real Madrid for a fee of £5 million, spending seven years there and winning eight major titles, including the 2011–12 edition of La Liga and two Champions League titles. He earned 56 caps for Spain, representing the country at the 2010 World Cup, Euro 2008 and Euro 2012 and winning all three tournaments.

Arbeloa began working as a manager in 2025 and, from January to June 2026, was in charge of Real Madrid's first team. In July, he was appointed at Fulham.

== Club career ==
=== Real Madrid ===
Arbeloa was born in Salamanca, Castile and León, relocating with his family to Zaragoza at the age of four. He started playing football at local Real Zaragoza, joining Real Madrid's youth system at the age of 18.

Arbeloa spent three full seasons with Real Madrid Castilla, the reserve team, two of those spent in the Segunda División B. In 2004–05, he contributed 32 games and one goal – playoffs included – as they returned to Segunda División after a 14-year absence. On 16 October 2004, he made his La Liga debut with the main squad, coming on as a second-half substitute in a 1–1 away draw against Real Betis.

=== Deportivo ===
On 24 July 2006, Arbeloa signed for Deportivo de La Coruña, with Real Madrid being entitled to 50% of any transfer occurring in the following three years. He said of his departure: "This is a strange situation for me; I have been playing for Real Madrid for five years, since I was 16", adding "Real always has the best players. There were eight defenders in the squad, something had to give in."

Over a six-month spell with the team from Galicia, Arbeloa featured in 21 official games, 18 of his league appearances being complete.

=== Liverpool ===
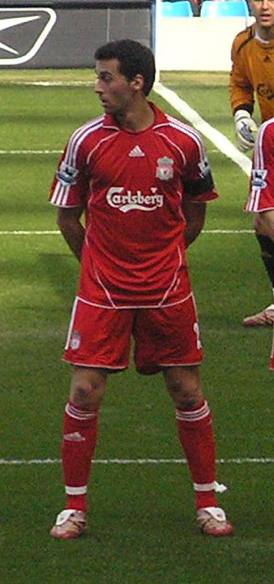
Arbeloa playing for Liverpool in 2007

Arbeloa signed for English club Liverpool on 31 January 2007, managed by countryman Rafael Benítez. He made his Premier League debut on 10 February, replacing Jermaine Pennant for the final 15 minutes of the 2–1 away loss to Newcastle United.

Arbeloa made his first start for the Reds against Barcelona, in the 2006–07 edition of the UEFA Champions League. He featured as a left-back at the Camp Nou, as his stronger right foot could stop Lionel Messi who had a tendency to cut his runs towards the center of the field; his team won 2–1 and eventually 2–2 on aggregate, with the player also featuring the full 90 minutes at Anfield.

Arbeloa scored his first goal for Liverpool against Reading, on 7 April 2007. He replaced Steve Finnan in the last minutes of the Champions League final, a 2–1 defeat to AC Milan.

Arbeloa's squad number changed from 2 to 17 for 2007–08, due to personal preference. He cemented a first-team place in that campaign, making 41 competitive appearances in a fourth-place finish.

On 17 May 2009, in a match against West Bromwich Albion, Arbeloa was involved in an on-field clash with teammate Jamie Carragher – the two had to be separated by Daniel Agger, Xabi Alonso, Emiliano Insúa and Pepe Reina. Carragher later explained that he clashed with Arbeloa as a moment of poor defending from the latter threatened the clean sheet, further explaining "we want to keep a clean sheet and we want Pepe to have a chance of the Golden Glove for the fourth season running"; Benítez refused to comment about the incident.

=== Return to Real Madrid ===
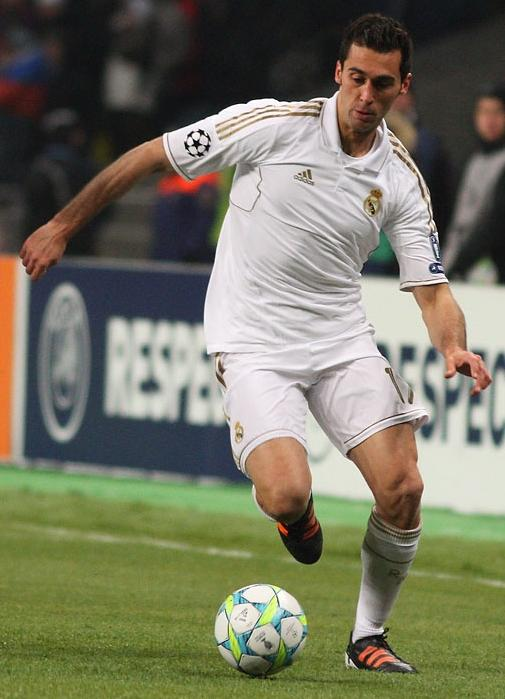
Arbeloa playing for Real Madrid in 2012

On 29 July 2009, it was announced that Real Madrid and Liverpool had reached an agreement on the transfer of Arbeloa, for a fee of £5 million and a five-year contract. After the departure of Míchel Salgado and Miguel Torres, he was handed the number 2 jersey.

Arbeloa spent the vast majority of his first season in his second stint as a left-back, netting his first goal on 13 February 2010 in a 3–0 away win over Xerez. His second came in the Madrid Derby on 28 March, scoring with his right foot past David de Gea in the 3–2 defeat of Atlético Madrid. Under new manager José Mourinho, he celebrated his tenth appearance in the Champions League with his first goal in the competition, netting from outside the penalty area in a 4–0 victory at Ajax in the group stage.

In the 2011–12 campaign, due to Ricardo Carvalho's lengthy injury, Sergio Ramos was relocated to centre-back and Arbeloa began appearing almost exclusively on the right side of the back four. On 1 August 2012, he extended his link to the club until June 2016.

Subsequently, Arbeloa became a fringe player. In 2015–16, he appeared in just nine matches in all competitions, two of those being in the Champions League, which was won for the second time in three years. On 8 May 2016, he confirmed he would leave on 30 June.

=== West Ham United ===
On 31 August 2016, Arbeloa returned to the Premier League for the first time in seven years, signing for West Ham United for one season. He made his debut on 21 September, playing the full 90 minutes in a 1–0 home win against Accrington Stanley in the EFL Cup.

Arbeloa was released at the end of the campaign after having made just four competitive appearances, three in the league. He retired in June 2017 at the age of 34, after a professional career that spanned 15 years.

== International career ==
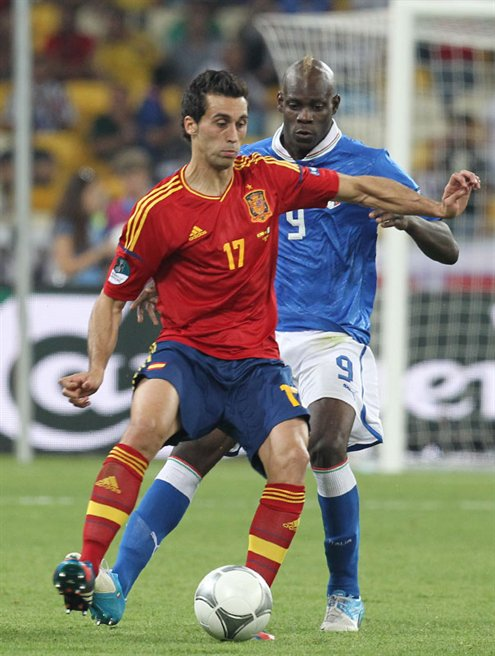
Arbeloa on the ball during the Euro 2012 final

On 1 February 2008, Arbeloa was called up to the Spanish national team for the first time, for a friendly with France in Málaga, but he was forced to pull out because of injury. He made his debut on 26 March against Italy, and was picked for UEFA Euro 2008's final stages, appearing in the first-round match against Greece (2–1 win) as the nation emerged victorious.

Arbeloa's versatility saw him being called up for the 2009 FIFA Confederations Cup and the 2010 FIFA World Cup, again as Ramos backup. His contribution in the latter tournament, which also ended in victory, consisted of 14 minutes in the 2–0 victory over Honduras in the group phase.

Vicente del Bosque selected Arbeloa for the following tournament, Euro 2012. Due to Carles Puyol's absence, however, he was now part of the starting XI alongside Ramos, Gerard Piqué and Jordi Alba, with Spain only conceding once in six fixtures and winning the tournament.

== Coaching career ==
=== Real Madrid ===
Arbeloa returned to Real Madrid in September 2020, being appointed manager of the under-14 side. Two years later, he progressed to the Juvenil A. On 28 May 2025, Arbeloa replaced Raúl at the helm of Castilla.

Arbeloa was promoted to the first team on 12 January 2026, following Xabi Alonso's departure. On his debut, they lost 3–2 at second-division Albacete in the round of 16 of the Copa del Rey; three days later, on his 43rd birthday, he oversaw a 2–0 win over Levante in the domestic league. Arbeloa led the club to the Champions League quarter-finals and a second-place finish in the domestic league, before announcing he would step down at the end of the season; his departure was confirmed on 9 June.

=== Fulham ===
On 7 July 2026, Fulham appointed Arbeloa as their new head coach on a three-year contract, replacing Marco Silva who had left to join Benfica.

== Career statistics ==
=== Club ===
Club	Season	League			National cup (Note: Includes Copa del Rey, FA Cup)		League cup (Note: Includes Football League Cup)		Europe (Note: All appearances in UEFA Champions League)		Other		Total	
Club	Season	Division	Apps	Goals	Apps	Goals	Apps	Goals	Apps	Goals	Apps	Goals	Apps	Goals
Real Madrid C	2002–03	Tercera División	16	0	—		—		—		—		16	0
Real Madrid B	2003–04	Segunda División B	22	0	—		—		—		—		22	0
Real Madrid B	2004–05	Segunda División B	28	0	—		—		—		—		28	0
Real Madrid B	2005–06	Segunda División	34	0	—		—		—		—		34	0
Real Madrid B	Total		84	0	—		—		—		—		84	0
Real Madrid	2004–05	La Liga	2	0	2	0	—		0	0	—		4	0
Deportivo	2006–07	La Liga	20	0	0	0	—		—		—		20	0
Liverpool	2006–07	Premier League	9	1	—		—		5	0	—		14	1
Liverpool	2007–08	Premier League	28	0	1	0	3	0	9	0	—		41	0
Liverpool	2008–09	Premier League	29	1	2	0	0	0	12	0	—		43	1
Liverpool	Total		66	2	3	0	3	0	26	0	—		98	2
Real Madrid	2009–10	La Liga	30	2	2	0	—		6	0	—		38	2
Real Madrid	2010–11	La Liga	26	0	8	0	—		9	1	—		43	1
Real Madrid	2011–12	La Liga	26	0	3	0	—		9	0	0	0	38	0
Real Madrid	2012–13	La Liga	26	0	6	0	—		7	0	2 (Note: Appearances in Supercopa de España)	0	40	0
Real Madrid	2013–14	La Liga	18	0	8	0	—		4	1	—		30	1
Real Madrid	2014–15	La Liga	22	1	3	0	—		9	1	1 (Note: Appearance in FIFA Club World Cup)	0	35	2
Real Madrid	2015–16	La Liga	6	0	1	0	—		2	0	—		9	0
Real Madrid	Total		153	3	31	0	—		46	3	3	0	233	6
West Ham United	2016–17	Premier League	3	0	0	0	1	0	—		—		4	0
Career total			344	5	36	0	6	0	72	3	3	0	459	8

=== International ===
Appearances and goals by national team and year
National team	Year	Apps	Goals
Spain
Spain	2008	4	0
Spain	2009	8	0
Spain	2010	8	0
Spain	2011	12	0
Spain	2012	13	0
Spain	2013	11	0
Total		56	0

== Managerial statistics ==
As of 21 November 2026

Managerial record by team and tenure
Team	Nat.	From	To	Record								Ref.
Team	Nat.	From	To	G	W	D	L	GF	GA	GD	Win %	Ref.
Real Madrid B	(Spain)	28 May 2025	12 January 2026	19	10	1	8	25	25	+0	52.63	
Real Madrid	(Spain)	12 January 2026	23 May 2026	28	18	2	8	58	34	+24	64.29	
Fulham	(England)	7 July 2026	Present	14	4	5	5	17	16	+1	28.57	
Career Total				61	32	8	21	100	75	+25	52.46	

== Honours ==
Liverpool

- UEFA Champions League runner-up: 2006–07

Real Madrid

- La Liga: 2011–12
- Copa del Rey: 2010–11, 2013–14; runner-up: 2012–13
- Supercopa de España: 2012; runner-up: 2011, 2014
- UEFA Champions League: 2013–14, 2015–16
- FIFA Club World Cup: 2014
- UEFA Super Cup: 2014

Spain

- FIFA World Cup: 2010
- UEFA European Championship: 2008, 2012
- FIFA Confederations Cup runner-up: 2013; third place: 2009

Individual

- Aragon Medal of Sporting Merit: 2010
- Royal Order of Sports Merit: 2011
- Zaragoza Sports Gala (Cesaraugusta Trophy, Men's Football): 2011
- ISDE Sports Convention Career Achievement: 2024
