= Guilherme Siqueira =

Brazilian footballer (born 1986)

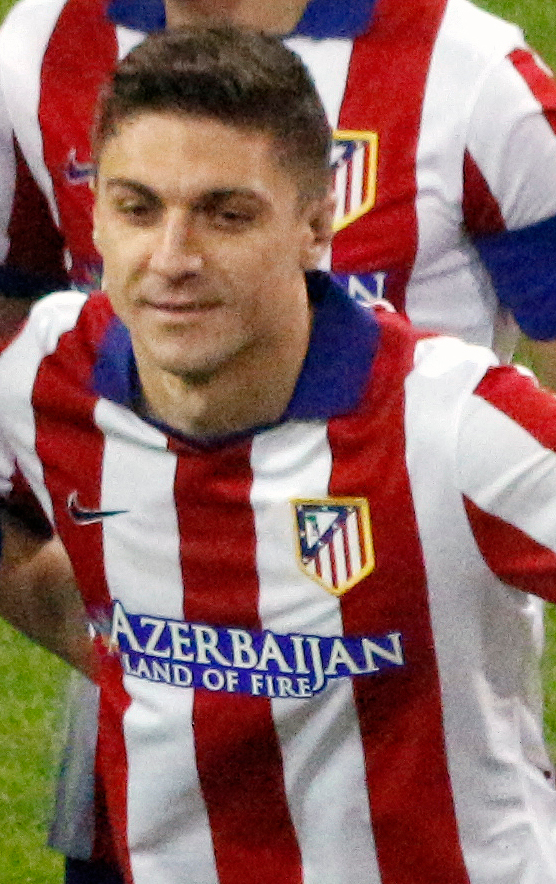
- Siqueira with Atlético Madrid in 2015

Personal information
- Full name: Guilherme Madalena Siqueira
- Date of birth: 28 April 1986 (age 40)
- Place of birth: Florianópolis, Brazil
- Height: 1.83 m (6 ft 0 in)
- Position: Left back

Youth career
- 2003: Figueirense
- 2004: Ipatinga
- 2004: → Avaí (loan)
- 2004–2006: Internazionale
- 2006: → Lazio (loan)

Senior career*
Years	Team	Apps	(Gls)
2006–2010	Udinese	23	(0)
2008–2009	→ Ancona (loan)	24	(1)
2010–2014	Granada	100	(12)
2013–2014	→ Benfica (loan)	18	(1)
2014–2017	Atlético Madrid	26	(1)
2016–2017	→ Valencia (loan)	24	(0)
Total		215	(15)
- * Club domestic league appearances and goals

Guilherme Madalena Siqueira (Brazilian Portuguese: [ɡiˈʎɛʁmi siˈkejɾɐ]; born 28 April 1986) is a Brazilian former footballer who played as a left back.

Siqueira started his senior career at Udinese in Italy before moving to Granada in Spain, where he was finally able to establish himself. He also briefly played in Portugal for Benfica, where he won the domestic treble in the 2013–14 season, before returning to Spanish football for the next three seasons with Atlético Madrid and Valencia.

== Club career ==
=== Early career ===
At age 18, Siqueira was signed by Internazionale from Ipatinga in August 2004, at first in temporary deal for €125,000. He also played for hometown clubs Figueirense (his first club) and Avaí before joining Inter.

In January 2006, as part of César's transfer, he went on loan to Lazio, which included an option to co-own the players rights at the end of season.

=== Udinese ===
On 11 August 2006, Siqueira joined Udinese in a co-ownership deal, for €750,000. Siqueira never became a regular for Udinese and made 3 starts and 13 substitute appearances in the 2006–07 season. He made his Serie A debut on 10 September 2006 in a 1–0 loss to Messina. During the 2007–08 season, Siqueira remained at Udinese but was seldom used. As Udinese did not buy full ownership from Inter, the out-of-favour Siqueira was loaned to Ancona to join another Inter-owned player, Rincón. During the 2008–09 season with Ancona, Siqueira featured regularly for the newly promoted club making 24 league appearances and scoring his first professional goal.

In June 2009, he returned to Udinese as the club now had Siqueira's entire registration rights. On 10 January 2010, he substituted Paolo Sammarco in the 71st minute, his first match of the season. He then made two more substitute appearances for the club.

=== Granada ===
In 2010, Siqueira joined Granada on loan as part of a partnership agreement with Udinese in which various players joined Granada from the Italian club. In his first season in Spain, Siqueira featured regularly for his new club and helped Granada gain promotion to La Liga, despite being sent off 3 times in 34 league matches. After a fine first season with Granada, on 30 June 2011 he penned a four-year contract to remain with the club, as his contract with Udinese expired.

On 20 March 2012, Siqueira scored an audacious meisteresque dink from the penalty spot against Barcelona in La Liga at the Camp Nou. Siqueria soon started to attract from other clubs to sign him. At one point, Valencia and Benfica were keen to sign him. However, Siqueira signed a further contract extension, which will keep him until 2017.

At the end of the 2012–13 season, which left the club in 15th position, Siqueira announced he intended to leave the club in the summer transfer window. Siqueira, however, denied he wanted to leave the club and said he was happy there in an exclusive interview with Marca. Despite this, Siqueria retained interest from English Premier League sides Everton, Liverpool and Stoke City.

In April 2014, Real Madrid made a bid for Siqueira from Granada and the move was agreed. However, this was denied by the club's president, Enrique Pina.

=== Benfica (loan) ===
On the very last minutes of the summer transfer deadline day, Siqueira signed a season-long loan deal with Benfica, with an option to make the move permanent for €7 million. He played in the club's 2–0 victory over Rio Ave in the 2014 Taça da Liga Final, and 99 minutes of the loss to Sevilla on penalties in the 2014 UEFA Europa League Final. Benfica also won the Primeira Liga title, with Siqueira playing 18 matches and scoring once, in a 2–0 win over Nacional on 27 October.

=== Atlético Madrid ===
On 6 June 2014, Atlético Madrid and Granada reached an agreement for the transfer of Siqueira for a reported €10 million fee, pending a medical examination. He signed a four-year contract after passing his medical, on 11 June 2014. Upon joining the club, Siqueira said that "it did not take a second to decide" to join Atlético.

Siqueira made his debut in a friendly match against Numancia, on 23 July 2014, which Atlético won 1–0. He made his competitive debut in the first leg of the 2014 Supercopa de España on 19 August, a 1–1 draw away to Real Madrid in which he played 64 minutes before being replaced by fellow debutant Cristian Ansaldi.

=== Valencia (loan) ===
On 1 February 2016, Siqueira was loaned to Valencia.

Having been without a club for over a year, he announced his retirement on 29 August 2018.

== International career ==
Despite gaining Italian citizenship, which made him eligible playing for Italy, Siqueira declared his desire to represent Spain, having been granted Spanish citizenship in October 2013.

== Career statistics ==
Club	Season	League	League		Cup		Europe		Other		Total	
Club	Season	League	Apps	Goals	Apps	Goals	Apps	Goals	Apps	Goals	Apps	Goals
Udinese	2006–07	Serie A	16	0	–		–		–		16	0
Udinese	2007–08	Serie A	4	0	5	0	–		–		9	0
Ancona (loan)	2008–09	Serie B	24	1	–		–		–		24	1
Udinese	2009–10	Serie A	3	0	0	0	–		–		3	0
Udinese	Total		23	0	5	0	0	0	0	0	28	0
Granada	2010–11	Segunda División	30	0	1	0	–		4	0	35	0
Granada	2011–12	La Liga	35	6	2	1	–		–		37	7
Granada	2012–13	La Liga	35	6	1	0	–		–		36	6
Granada	Total		100	12	4	1	0	0	4	0	108	13
Benfica (loan)	2013–14	Primeira Liga	18	1	5	0	10	0	–		33	1
Atlético Madrid	2014–15	La Liga	25	1	4	0	6	0	2	0	37	1
Atlético Madrid	2015–16	La Liga	1	0	3	0	3	0	–		7	0
Atlético Madrid	Total		26	1	7	0	6	0	2	0	44	1
Valencia (loan)	2015–16	La Liga	14	0	1	0	–		–		15	0
Valencia (loan)	2016–17	La Liga	10	0	1	0	–		–		11	0
Valencia (loan)	Total		24	0	2	0	0	0	0	0	26	0
Total			215	15	23	1	16	0	6	0	260	16

== Honours ==
Benfica

- Primeira Liga: 2013–14
- Taça de Portugal: 2013–14
- Taça da Liga: 2013–14
- UEFA Europa League runner-up: 2013–14

Atlético Madrid

- Supercopa de España: 2014
