= 2016–17 Atlético Madrid season =

86th season in existence of Atlético Madrid

Atlético Madrid
2016–17 season
- President: Enrique Cerezo
- Head coach: Diego Simeone
- Stadium: Vicente Calderón
- La Liga: 3rd
- Copa del Rey: Semi-finals
- UEFA Champions League: Semi-finals
- Top goalscorer: League: Antoine Griezmann (16); All: Antoine Griezmann (26)
- Highest home attendance: 53,668 (vs Real Madrid)
- Lowest home attendance: 31,059 (vs Celta Vigo)
- Average home league attendance: 44,671
Home colours	Away colours

The 2016–17 season was Atlético Madrid's 86th season in existence and the club's 80th season in La Liga, the top league of Spanish football. Atlético competed in La Liga, Copa del Rey and UEFA Champions League.

== Kits ==
Supplier: Nike / First Sponsor: Plus500

Home	Home alt. 1	Home alt. 2	Home alt. 3	Away	Away alt. 1	Away alt. 2	Third

Goalkeeper 1	Goalkeeper 2	Goalkeeper 3

== Season overview ==
=== June ===
On 16 June, Atlético reached an agreement with Benfica for the €25 million transfer of winger Nicolás Gaitán.

=== July ===
On 4 July, Atlético reached an agreement with striker Fernando Torres on a one-year contract after his contract with Milan expired following the end of his 2015–16 loan stint with Atlético. On 5 July, the club announced it had signed right back Šime Vrsaljko to a five-year contract after the club reached an agreement for his transfer from Sassuolo for €16 million. On 6 July, Atlético agreed to send defensive midfielder Matías Kranevitter to Sevilla on loan for the 2016–17 season for a €2 million fee. The following day, the club confirmed an agreement with Newcastle United for the transfer of right back Jesús Gámez on a free deal. On 9 July, the club confirmed a €3.5 million agreement with Espanyol for the transfer of striker Léo Baptistão; Baptistão had spent the 2015–16 on loan at Villarreal. On 12 July, an agreement was reached with Girona over the transfer of Bono; Bono had spent the 2015–16 on loan at Zaragoza. On 14 July, Atlético presented its home and away kit for the 2016–17 season.

On 15 July, the schedule for the 2016–17 La Liga season was released; Atlético will play his first league match at home on 21 August against newly promoted Alavés. On 23 July, Atlético played its first friendly game of the pre-season, winning the IV Jesús Gil y Gil Memorial after defeating Numancia 2–0 from a goal from Fernando Torres and an own goal from Francisco Regalón. On 26 July, Atlético took 24 players on its tour of Australian to play two fixtures, one being in the 2016 International Champions Cup. In the tour's first match, the club defeated Tottenham Hotspur 1–0 through a Diego Godín goal. On 30, July the club reached a €32 million agreement for the transfer of striker Kevin Gameiro from Sevilla. The club also reached an agreement with Sevilla for the loan of striker Luciano Vietto for the 2016–17 season. Atlético's second and final match in Australia was played on 31 July, a 1–0 defeat to the Melbourne Victory.

=== August ===
On 6 August, Atlético was set to play its fourth pre-season match on 6 August against Galatasaray, but the match was canceled due to circumstances in Turkey. Atlético instead organized a replacement match on 6 August against Crotone. On 4 August, Atlético announced it had extended the contract of Théo Hernandez, and that he would be loaned out to Alavés for the 2016–17 season. On 6 August, the club played its fourth match of the pre-season under "LaLiga World", defeating Crotone 2–0 via Nicolas Gaitán and Diogo Jota goals. That same day, the club extended the contract of centre back Lucas Hernandez until 2020. On 11 August, the club has reached an €18 million agreement with Swansea City for the transfer of striker Borja Bastón.

Atlético played his fifth game of the pre-season competing for the Ramón de Carranza Trophy. The club was defeated by Cádiz in a penalty shootout after a dubious penalty in the 90th minute led to Cádiz nullifying Yannick Carrasco's goal. Atlético's last opponent in the current pre-season was "Nigeria All Star". Shortly before the match on 13 August, Atlético and Villarreal reached an agreement for the loan of Rafael Santos Borré for the 2016–17 season. In the last friendly match, Atlético won and finished third in the Carranza after beating Nigeria All Stars; goals were scored by Gaitán and Godín. Atlético finished its pre-season with a record of 4–1–1, scoring eight goals and conceding three.

After the clubs had already agreed the loan deal of André Moreira to Belenenses, the clubs later reached an agreement cancelling the deal. On 18 August, Atlético has reached an agreement with Vitória de Guimarães for the loan of Bernard Mensah for the remainder of the season. Atlético also confirmed the transfer of Axel Werner from Argentinian club Atlético Rafaela; he was immediately loaned to Boca Juniors. Atlético also loaned out Emiliano Velázquez to Braga.

In its first league match, on 22 August, Atlético drew against Alavés 1–1, with a penalty scored by Kevin Gameiro. On 25 August, Atlético has reached an agreement with Sunderland for the loan of Javier Manquillo and an agreement with Porto for the loan of Óliver. On the same day, Atlético were drawn into Group D of the Champions League alongside German champion Bayern Munich, Dutch champion PSV and runner-up in the Russian championship Rostov. On 27 August, the club has reached an agreement with Porto for the loan of Diogo Jota until the end of the season. Atlético drew in its second league match against newly promoted Leganés, 0–0.

=== September ===
Two goals from Griezmann, one from Koke and one from Correa was enough for high victory against Celta. On 13 September, Atlético played its first match in the Champions League group stage, winning 1–0 over PSV, with goal by Saúl. With five goals, two from Griezmann, two from Torres and one from Gameiro, the team beat Sporting. Correa scores a valuable tie against Barcelona for third draw. The goal from Griezmann was enough for another win in the league over Deportivo. In its second match in the Champions League, Atlético won 1–0 at home stadium over Bayern Munich; the goal scored Carrasco.

=== October ===
Atlético beat Valencia thanks to goals from the Griezmann and Gameiro. The Valencia's goalkeeper also saved two penalties from Griezmann and Gabi. On 14 October, Atlético was drawn in the round of 32 of the 2016–17 Copa del Rey against Guijuelo. Hat-trick of Carrasco, two Gaitan and one of Correa and Tiago were defeated 7–1 by Granada. Third win of Atlético in the Champions against Rostov reached thanks to Carrasco's goal. First defeat of the season for team came from Sevilla with a goal from Nzonzi. Last match in October, Atlético brought a difficult victory over Málaga. Carrasco and Gameiro had scored each twice.

=== November ===
Atlético suffered, but two goals from Griezmann were enough to beat Rostov. Two penalties decided the game for Real Sociedad and second defeat in the league for the team. On 19 November, Real Madrid defeated Atlético in the first Madrid derby of the season, with a hat-trick from Ronaldo. In the fifth game of the Champions League group stage Atletico came to victory over PSV Eindhoven 2–0 with goals by Gameiro and Griezmann. Atlético announced it would play a friendly match against Al-Ittihad on 30 December. Goals from Godín and Gameiro eliminated Osasuna in a minute. Carrasco ended the final goal. Two goals from Carrasco and one each from Vrsaljko, Correa, Rober and Saúl secured a 6–0 victory in the first leg of the Copa del Rey, round of 32, over Guijuelo.

=== December ===
In its first match of December, Atlético drew with Espanyol (0–0). Atlético was defeated in its last Champions League group stage match, against Bayern Munich; Atlético nonetheless finished first in its group to progress to the competition's round of 16. On 12 December, Atlético was drawn to face Bayer Leverkusen for the Champions League round of 16. Atlético lost to Villarreal. Atlético closed the league in 2016 with a win against Las Palmas, with Saúl scoring the match's only goal. After the first-leg win away at Guijuelo in the Copa del Rey, the second-leg was decided in the first half with four goals scored by Nicolás Gaitán, Ángel Correa, Juanfran and Fernando Torres to send the club to the round of 16, 10–1 on aggregate. On 30 December, Atlético play the last game of the year with a friendly against Al-Ittihad and won by 3–2, with goals from Juanfran, Torres and Giménez.

=== January ===
The new year for the team began with a 2–0 victory against Las Palmas in the first leg of the cup last 16; Koke and Griezmann scored. On 7 January, the team reached important victory in the first league match of 2017. They defeated Eibar with goals by Saúl and Griezmann. Although Las Palmas won the second leg match of the cup last 16 and Griezmann and Correa scored the goals, for the team was enough the advantage of the first leg to advance to the quarter-finals. On 13 January, Atlético was drawn in the quarterfinals of the cup against Eibar. The team achieve victory against Betis with goal by Gaitán. Atlético wins an important match in the first leg of the cup quarter-finals against Eibar. Griezmann, Correa and Gameiro scored the goals. Goals from Koke and Griezmann to win an important point against Athletic Bilbao. The score 2–2 on Ipurua and 5–2 on aggregate for Atlético, put the team in the semi-finals of the cup tournament. On 27 January, Atlético was drawn in the semi-finals of the cup against Barcelona. Atlético again drew against Alavés.

=== February ===
On 1 February, Atlético lost 1–2 against Barcelona in the first leg of the Copa del Rey semi-final; Griezmann scored for Atlético. Fernando Torres scored the two goals for the victory against Leganés. Atlético drew 1–1 in the second leg of the Copa del Rey semi-final, but this was not enough to qualify for the finals owing to Barcelona's 1–2 victory in the first leg. The great goals from Torres and Carrasco tied two times over Celta, but Griezmann scored on 88 minutes to give the victory to the home team. Carrasco scored the first goal and Gameiro scored his hattrick in five minutes for victory over Sporting Gijón. Saúl, Griezmann, Gameiro from a penalty kick, and Torres scored in the win in Leverkusen that end with a results 2–4. A goal by Godín was not enough to avoid defeat against Barcelona.

=== March ===
On 2 March, Atlético drew with Deportivo, with goal by Griezmann. A brace by Griezmann and a goal by Gameiro beat Valencia. Griezmann scored the goal of an important victory over Granada with a goal in the final stretch of the match. The victory of the first leg (2–4) was enough after the goalless tie at the Calderón. Atlético advanced to the quarter-finals of the Champions League, 4–2 on aggregate. On 17 March, in the draw for the quarter-finals of the Champions League, Atlético will face Leicester City. Godín, Griezmann and Koke scored the goals against Sevilla.

=== April ===
The team won against Málaga with goals by Koke and Filipe Luis. With goal by Filipe Luis, Atlético beat Real Sociedad. On 8 April, Atlético tied at the Bernabéu against Real Madrid. Griezmann scored the goal for the team. Griezmann, from a penalty, scored a goal, that defeated the Leicester in the first leg of the Champions League quarterfinal. Atlético added another win against Osasuna thanks to two goals by Carrasco and one by Filipe Luis. Goal by Saúl secured the pass of Atlético to the Champions League semi-finals after drawing over Leicester City 1–1 (2–1 on aggregate). On 21 April, in the draw for the semi-finals of the Champions League, Atlético will face Real Madrid Atlético beat Espanyol with a goal by Griezmann. In the 34th round of league the team lose against Villarreal by 0–1. Atlético beat Las Palmas with three goals in 18 minutes by Gameiro (2) and Saúl.

=== May ===
Atlético Madrid lost in the semifinals of the Champions League against Real Madrid in the first leg after a Cristiano Ronaldo hat-trick saw them lose 3-0. A goal by Saúl was enough for victory against Eibar. A victory in the second leg of the semifinals of the Champions League was not enough to advance to the final as Real Madrid advanced 4–2 on aggregate. A goal by Savić gave Atlético a tie against Real Betis. The season for Atletico ended on 21 May, with the last matchday of the league and the last official fixture at the Vicente Calderón. The team beat Athletic Bilbao 3–1, Torres with two goals and Correa with one. The team finished in third position.

== Players ==
N	Pos.	Nat.	Name	Age	EU	Since	App	Goals	Ends	Transfer fee	Notes
1	GK	(Spain)	Miguel Ángel Moyà	33	EU	2014	60	0	2018	€3M	
2	DF	(Uruguay)	Diego Godín	31	EU	2010	305	22	2019	€8M	Second nationality: (Spain)
3	DF	(Brazil)	Filipe Luís	31	EU	2010–2014; 2015	273	9	2019	€16M	Second nationality: (Italy)
5	MF	(Portugal)	Tiago	36	EU	2011	228	19	2017	Free	
6	MF	(Spain)	Koke	25	EU	2009	323	28	2019	Academy	
7	FW	(France)	Antoine Griezmann	26	EU	2014	160	83	2021	€30M	
8	MF	(Spain)	Saúl	22	EU	2012	148	22	2021	Academy	
9	FW	(Spain)	Fernando Torres	33	EU	2001–2007; 2015	359	119	2017	Free	
10	MF	(Belgium)	Yannick Carrasco	23	EU	2015	96	19	2022	€20M	Second nationality: (Spain)
11	FW	(Argentina)	Ángel Correa	22	Non-EU	2014	83	16	2019	€7.5M	
12	MF	(Argentina)	Augusto Fernández	31	EU	2016	24	0	2019	€6.5M	Second nationality: (Spain)
13	GK	(Slovenia)	Jan Oblak	24	EU	2014	113	0	2021	€16M	
14	CM	(Spain)	Gabi (captain)	33	EU	2004–2007; 2011	367	9	2018	€3M	
15	DF	(Montenegro)	Stefan Savić	26	Non-EU	2015	73	1	2020	€25M	
16	DF	(Croatia)	Šime Vrsaljko	25	EU	2016	25	1	2021	€16M	
17	MF	(Italy)	Alessio Cerci	29	EU	2014	8	0	2018	€15M	
19	DF	(France)	Lucas Hernandez	21	EU	2014	44	0	2020	Academy	Second nationality: (Spain)
20	DF	(Spain)	Juanfran	32	EU	2011	295	6	2018	€4.25M	
21	FW	(France)	Kevin Gameiro	30	EU	2016	46	16	2020	€32M	
22	MF	(Ghana)	Thomas Partey	24	Non-EU	2013	47	4	2022	Academy	
23	MF	(Argentina)	Nicolás Gaitán	29	Non-EU	2016	36	4	2020	€25M	
24	DF	(Uruguay)	José Giménez	22	EU	2013	96	4	2018	€0.9M	Second nationality: (Spain)
25	GK	(Portugal)	André Moreira	21	EU	2014	0	0	2020	€0.35M	

- Last updated: 31 August 2016
- Source: Atlético Madrid
- Ordered by squad number.

== Staff ==
=== Coaching staff ===
Position	Staff
Manager	(Argentina) Diego Simeone
Assistant coach	(Argentina) Germán Burgos
Assistant coach	(Spain) Juan Vizcaíno
Goalkeeper coach	(Argentina) Pablo Vercellone
Fitness coach	(Uruguay) Oscar Ortega
Fitness coach	(Spain) Carlos Menéndez
Fitness coach	(Spain) Iván Rafael Díaz Infante

=== Medical ===
Position	Staff
Head of Medical Department	(Spain) José María Villalón
Club doctor	(Spain) Gorka de Abajo
Physiotherapist	(Spain) Jesús Vázquez
Physiotherapist	(Spain) Esteban Arévalo
Physiotherapist	(Spain) David Loras
Physiotherapist	(Spain) Felipe Iglesias Arroyo
Rehabilitation Physio	(Spain) Daniel Castro

=== Management ===
Position	Staff
Chairman	(Spain) Enrique Cerezo
CEO	(Spain) Miguel Ángel Gil Marín
Sporting director	(Spain) José Luis Caminero
Football department head	(Spain) Pedro Pablo Matesanz

== Transfers ==
=== In ===
No.	Pos.	Nat.	Name	Age	EU	Moving from	Type	Transfer window	Ends	Transfer fee	Source
—	GK	(Morocco)	Bono	25	Non-EU	Zaragoza	Loan Return	Summer			
—	MF	(Ghana)	Bernard Mensah	21	Non-EU	Getafe	Loan Return	Summer			
—	ST	(Colombia)	Rafael Santos Borré	20	Non-EU	(Colombia) Deportivo Cali	Loan Return	Summer			
—	CB	(Uruguay)	Emiliano Velázquez	21	Non-EU	Getafe	Loan Return	Summer			
25	GK	(Portugal)	André Moreira	20	EU	(Portugal) União Madeira (Portugal) Os Belenenses	Loan Return	Summer			Atlético.com
—	CF	(Spain)	Borja Bastón	23	EU	Eibar	Loan Return	Summer			
—	MF	(France)	Josuha Guilavogui	25	EU	(Germany) VfL Wolfsburg	Loan Return	Summer			
—	CF	(Brazil)	Léo Baptistão	23	Non-EU	Villarreal	Loan Return	Summer			
4	DF	(Spain)	Javier Manquillo	22	EU	(France) Marseille	Loan Return	Summer			
—	MF	(Italy)	Alessio Cerci	28	EU	(Italy) Genoa	Loan Return	Summer			
—	RB	(Portugal)	Sílvio	28	EU	(Portugal) Benfica	Loan Return	Summer			
9	FW	(Spain)	Fernando Torres	32	EU	(Italy) Milan	Transfer	Summer	2017	Free	Atlético.com
—	DF	(France)	Théo Hernandez	18	EU	Atlético Madrid B	Academy	Summer	2017	Free	
21	FW	(France)	Kevin Gameiro	29	EU	Sevilla	Transfer	Summer	2020	€32M	Atlético.com
23	MF	(Argentina)	Nicolás Gaitán	28	Non-EU	(Portugal) Benfica	Transfer	Summer	2020	€25M	Atlético.com
16	DF	(Croatia)	Šime Vrsaljko	24	EU	(Italy) Sassuolo	Transfer	Summer	2021	€16M	Atlético.com; Sassuolo.it (in Italian)
18	MF	(Portugal)	Diogo Jota	19	EU	(Portugal) Paços de Ferreira	Transfer	Summer	2021	€7.2M	Atlético.com
—	GK	(Argentina)	Axel Werner	20	Non-EU	(Argentina) Atletico Rafaela	Transfer	Summer	2021	€0.8M	Atlético.com

=== Out ===
No.	Pos.	Nat.	Name	Age	EU	Moving to	Type	Transfer window	Transfer fee	Source
—	DF	(France)	Théo Hernandez	18	EU	Alavés	Loan	Summer	Free	Atlético.com
—	FW	(Colombia)	Rafael Santos Borré	20	Non-EU	Villarreal	Loan	Summer	Free	Atlético.com
—	CM	(Ghana)	Bernard Mensah	21	Non-EU	(Portugal) Vitória de Guimarães	Loan	Summer	Free	Atlético.com
—	GK	(Argentina)	Axel Werner	20	Non-EU	(Argentina) Boca Juniors	Loan	Summer	Free	Atlético.com
—	DF	(Uruguay)	Emiliano Velázquez	21	Non-EU	(Portugal) Braga	Loan	Summer	Free	Atlético.com
17	DF	(Spain)	Javier Manquillo	22	EU	(England) Sunderland	Loan	Summer	Free	Atlético.com
10	MF	(Spain)	Óliver	31	EU	(Portugal) Porto	Loan	Summer	Free	Atlético.com
23	FW	(Argentina)	Luciano Vietto	22	Non-EU	Sevilla	Loan	Summer	€3.5M	Sevilla.es (in Spanish); Atletico.com
8	MF	(Argentina)	Matías Kranevitter	23	Non-EU	Sevilla	Loan	Summer	€2M	Atlético.com
—	MF	(Portugal)	Diogo Jota	19	EU	(Portugal) Porto	Loan	Summer		fcporto.pt
18	DF	(Spain)	Jesús Gámez	31	EU	(England) Newcastle United	Transfer	Summer	Free	Atlético.com
—	GK	(Morocco)	Bono	25	Non-EU	Girona	Transfer	Summer	Free	Atlético.com
—	DF	(Portugal)	Sílvio	28	EU	(England) Wolverhampton Wanderers	Transfer	Summer	Free	Wolves.co.uk
—	FW	(Spain)	Borja Bastón	23	EU	(Wales) Swansea City	Transfer	Summer	€18M	Atlético.com
—	FW	(Brazil)	Léo Baptistão	23	Non-EU	Espanyol	Transfer	Summer	€3.5M	Atlético.com
—	MF	(France)	Josuha Guilavogui	25	EU	(Germany) VfL Wolfsburg	Transfer	Summer	€3M	Atlético.com

== Pre-season and friendlies ==
=== Summer ===
Win Draw Loss Cancelled

23 July 2016 1	Numancia	0–2	Atlético Madrid	Burgo de Osma, Spain
19:00 CEST (UTC+02:00)		Report	Torres 38'; Regalón 47' (o.g.)	Stadium: Estadio El Plantío; Attendance: 2,500; Referee: Víctor Laín Pérez

29 July 2016 2	Tottenham Hotspur	0–1	Atlético Madrid	Melbourne, Australia
20:00 AEST (UTC+10:00); 12:00 CEST (UTC+02:00)		Report	Godín 40'	Stadium: Melbourne Cricket Ground; Attendance: 42,107; Referee: Jarred Gillett (Australia)

31 July 2016 3	Melbourne Victory	1–0	Atlético Madrid	Geelong, Australia
14:00 AEST(UTC+10:00); 06:00 CEST (UTC+02:00)	Ansell 44'	Report		Stadium: Simonds Stadium; Attendance: 16,652; Referee: Alan Milliner (Australia)

6 August 2016	Galatasaray	Cancelled	Atlético Madrid	Istanbul, Turkey
--:-- CEST (UTC+02:00)		Report		Stadium: Türk Telekom Arena

6 August 2016 4	Crotone	0–2	Atlético Madrid	Cosenza, Italy
20:00 CEST (UTC+02:00)		Report	Gaitán 59'; Jota 93'	Stadium: Stadio San Vito; Referee: Fabio Maresca

12 August 2016 5	Cádiz	1–1 (3–2 p)	Atlético Madrid	Cádiz, Spain
18:30 CEST (UTC+02:00)	David Sánchez 90' (pen.)	Report	Carrasco 13'	Stadium: Estadio Ramón de Carranza; Referee: Pedro Jesús Pérez Montero
	Penalties
	Abel (penalty scored); Ortuño (penalty scored); Aitor (penalty scored); David Sánchez (penalty missed)		(penalty missed) Torres; (penalty scored) Gabi; (penalty scored) Saúl; (penalty missed) Carrasco; (penalty missed) Giménez

13 August 2016 6	Atlético Madrid	2–1	Nigeria All Stars	Cádiz, Spain
18:30 CEST (UTC+02:00)	Gaitán 43'; Godín 89'	Report	Bashir 87'	Stadium: Estadio Ramón de Carranza; Referee: Juan Peña Varela

=== Winter ===
30 December 2016 7	Al-Ittihad	2–3	Atlético Madrid	Jeddah, Saudi Arabia
21:00 AST (UTC+03:00); 19:00 CET (UTC+01:00)	Kahraba 44'; Akaïchi 45'	Report	Juanfran 23'; Torres 63' (pen.); Giménez 72'	Stadium: King Abdullah Sports City

== Competitions ==
Win Draw Loss

=== La Liga ===
==== League table ====
Pos	Team	Pld	W	D	L	GF	GA	GD	Pts	Qualification or relegation
1	Real Madrid (C)	38	29	6	3	106	41	+65	93	Qualification for the Champions League group stage
2	Barcelona	38	28	6	4	116	37	+79	90	Qualification for the Champions League group stage
3	Atlético Madrid	38	23	9	6	70	27	+43	78	Qualification for the Champions League group stage
4	Sevilla	38	21	9	8	69	49	+20	72	Qualification for the Champions League play-off round
5	Villarreal	38	19	10	9	56	33	+23	67	Qualification for the Europa League group stage (Note: Since the winners of the 2016–17 Copa del Rey, Barcelona, qualified for European competition based on league position, the spot awarded to the cup winners (Europa League group stage) was passed to the sixth-placed team and the spot awarded to the sixth-placed team (Europa League third qualifying round) was passed to the seventh-placed team.)

Source: La Liga, Soccerway
Rules for classification: 1) Points; 2) Head-to-head points; 3) Head-to-head goal difference; 4) Goal difference; 5) Goals scored; 6) Fair-play points; 7) Play-off.
(C) Champions

==== Results by round ====
Round	1	2	3	4	5	6	7	8	9	10	11	12	13	14	15	16	17	18	19	20	21	22	23	24	25	26	27	28	29	30	31	32	33	34	35	36	37	38
Ground	H	A	A	H	A	H	A	H	A	H	A	H	A	H	A	H	A	H	A	A	H	H	A	H	A	H	A	H	A	H	A	H	A	H	A	H	A	H
Result	D	D	W	W	D	W	W	W	L	W	L	L	W	D	L	W	W	W	D	D	W	W	W	L	D	W	W	W	W	W	D	W	W	L	W	W	D	W
Position	9	12	7	4	4	3	1	1	5	3	5	6	4	4	6	6	4	4	4	4	4	4	4	4	4	4	4	4	3	3	3	3	3	3	3	3	3	3

Updated to match(es) played on 21 May 2017. Source: Competitive matches
A = Away; H = Home; W = Win; D = Draw; L = Loss

==== Matches ====
21 August 2016 1	Atlético Madrid	1–1	Alavés	Madrid
22:15 CEST (UTC+02:00)	Gameiro 90+3' (pen.)	Report	Édgar (yellow card) 87'; Ibai (yellow card) 88'; Laguardia (yellow card) 90+1'; Camarasa (yellow card) 90+1'; M. García 90+5'	Stadium: Vicente Calderón; Attendance: 36,455; Referee: Ignacio Iglesias Villanueva; Man of the Match: M. García

27 August 2016 2	Leganés	0–0	Atlético Madrid	Leganés
22:15 CEST (UTC+02:00)	Alberto (yellow card) 61'; Pérez (yellow card) 70'; Mantovani (yellow card) 72'	Report	Saúl (yellow card) 37'	Stadium: Butarque; Attendance: 10,124; Referee: José María Sánchez Martínez; Man of the Match: Filipe Luís

10 September 2016 3	Celta Vigo	0–4	Atlético Madrid	Vigo
13:00 CEST (UTC+02:00)	Señé (yellow card) 44'	Report	Gabi (yellow card) 26'; Koke 53'; Correa (yellow card) 70', (goal) 89'; Griezmann 73', 81'	Stadium: Balaídos; Attendance: 18,100; Referee: Santiago Jaime Latre; Man of the Match: Griezmann

17 September 2016 4	Atlético Madrid	5–0	Sporting Gijón	Madrid
16:15 CEST (UTC+02:00)	Griezmann 2', 31'; Gameiro 5'; Torres 72', 90+1' (pen.)	Report	Amorebieta (yellow card) 15'; Lillo (yellow card) 15'	Stadium: Vicente Calderón; Attendance: 45,700; Referee: Daniel Ocón Arráiz; Man of the Match: Griezmann

21 September 2016 5	Barcelona	1–1	Atlético Madrid	Barcelona
22:00 CEST (UTC+02:00)	Rakitić 41'; L. Suárez (yellow card) 84'; Alba (yellow card) 90'	Report	Koke (yellow card) 54'; Correa 61'; Griezmann (yellow card) 67'; Partey (yellow card) 82'; Filipe Luís (yellow card) 86'	Stadium: Camp Nou; Attendance: 89,421; Referee: David Fernández Borbalán; Man of the Match: Iniesta

25 September 2016 6	Atlético Madrid	1–0	Deportivo La Coruña	Madrid
16:15 CEST (UTC+02:00)	L. Hernandez (yellow card) 42'; Griezmann 70'	Report	Fajr (yellow card) 38' (yellow-red card) 45+2'; Çolak (yellow card) 55'; Babel (yellow card) 84'	Stadium: Vicente Calderón; Attendance: 45,653; Referee: Jesús Gil Manzano; Man of the Match: Gabi

2 October 2016 7	Valencia	0–2	Atlético Madrid	Valencia
12:00 CEST (UTC+02:00)	Mangala (yellow card) 60'	Report	Filipe Luís (yellow card) 28'; Griezmann (yellow card) 58', (goal) 63'; Tiago (yellow card) 82'; Gameiro 90+3'	Stadium: Mestalla; Attendance: 43,327; Referee: Carlos Clos Gómez; Man of the Match: Alves

15 October 2016 8	Atlético Madrid	7–1	Granada	Madrid
18:30 CEST (UTC+02:00)	Carrasco 34', 45', 61'; Correa (yellow card) 60', (goal) 85'; Gaitán 63', 81'; Tiago 87'	Report	Cuenca 18'; Agbo (yellow card) 60'	Stadium: Vicente Calderón; Attendance: 48,278; Referee: Ricardo de Burgos Bengoetxea; Man of the Match: Carrasco

23 October 2016 9	Sevilla	1–0	Atlético Madrid	Seville
16:15 CEST (UTC+02:00)	Rami (yellow card) 7'; Nzonzi (yellow card) 38', (goal) 73'; Nasri (yellow card) 45+1'; Mariano (yellow card) 81'	Report	Correa (yellow card) 42'; Gabi (yellow card) 44'; Koke (yellow card) 62' (yellow-red card) 77'	Stadium: Ramón Sánchez Pizjuán; Attendance: 34,571; Referee: Juan Martínez Munuera; Man of the Match: Escudero

29 October 2016 10	Atlético Madrid	4–2	Málaga	Madrid
18:30 CEST (UTC+02:00)	Carrasco 7', 86'; Gameiro 24', 44'; Savić (yellow card) 49' (yellow-red card) 60'; Oblak (yellow card) 77'; Saúl (yellow card) 84'	Report	Sandro 31'; Castro (yellow card) 43' (yellow-red card) 88'; Camacho 64', (yellow card) 90+1'; En-Nesyri (yellow card) 69'; Villanueva (yellow card) 73'; Ricca (yellow card) 77'	Stadium: Vicente Calderón; Attendance: 47,320; Referee: Xavier Estrada Fernández; Man of the Match: Carrasco

5 November 2016 11	Real Sociedad	2–0	Atlético Madrid	San Sebastián
16:15 CET (UTC+01:00)	Vela 54' (pen.), (yellow card) 65'; Willian José 75' (pen.); Canales (yellow card) 80'	Report	Godín (yellow card) 59'; Juanfran (yellow card) 68'; Torres (yellow card) 90'; Partey (yellow card) 90+1'	Stadium: Anoeta; Attendance: 24,013; Referee: Alfonso Álvarez Izquierdo; Man of the Match: Vela

19 November 2016 12	Atlético Madrid	0–3	Real Madrid	Madrid
20:45 CET (UTC+01:00)	Gabi (yellow card) 26'; Koke (yellow card) 63'; Godín (yellow card) 71'; Correa (yellow card) 84'	Report	Ronaldo 23', 71' (pen.), 77', (yellow card) 63'; Vázquez (yellow card) 78'	Stadium: Vicente Calderón; Attendance: 53,668; Referee: David Fernández Borbalán; Man of the Match: Ronaldo

27 November 2016 13	Osasuna	0–3	Atlético Madrid	Pamplona
16:15 CET (UTC+01:00)	Tano (yellow card) 10'; Čaušić (yellow card) 22'	Report	Tiago (yellow card) 21'; Giménez (yellow card) 31'; Godín 36'; Gameiro 37'; Carrasco 90'	Stadium: El Sadar; Attendance: 16,411; Referee: Antonio Mateu Lahoz

3 December 2016 14	Atlético Madrid	0–0	Espanyol	Madrid
20:45 CET (UTC+01:00)	Koke (yellow card) 30'; Godín (yellow card) 88'	Report	Diop (yellow card) 23'; Gerard (yellow card) 75'	Stadium: Vicente Calderón; Attendance: 39,738; Referee: Santiago Jaime Latre

12 December 2016 15	Villarreal	3–0	Atlético Madrid	Villarreal
20:45 CET (UTC+01:00)	Trigueros 28'; Dos Santos 38', (yellow card) 45'; Sansone (yellow card) 42'; Álvaro (yellow card) 85'; Soriano 90+3'	Report	Correa (yellow card) 45'; Gabi (yellow card) 67'; Saúl (yellow card) 85'	Stadium: El Madrigal; Attendance: 19,370; Referee: Alejandro Hernández Hernández; Man of the Match: Trigueros

17 December 2016 16	Atlético Madrid	1–0	Las Palmas	Madrid
16:15 CET (UTC+01:00)	Saúl (yellow card) 43', (goal) 59'; Carrasco (yellow card) 73'	Report	Mesa (yellow card) 56'	Stadium: Vicente Calderón; Attendance: 39,388; Referee: Mario Melero López; Man of the Match: Saúl

7 January 2017 17	Eibar	0–2	Atlético Madrid	Eibar
16:15 CET (UTC+01:00)	Adrián (yellow card) 20'	Report	Vrsaljko (yellow card) 29'; Saúl 54'; Griezmann 74'; Koke (yellow card) 81'	Stadium: Ipurua; Attendance: 5,780; Referee: Jesús Gil Manzano; Man of the Match: Giménez

14 January 2017 18	Atlético Madrid	1–0	Betis	Madrid
18:30 CET (UTC+01:00)	Gaitán 8'	Report	Piccini (yellow card) 61'; Alegría (yellow card) 79'; Ceballos (yellow card) 89'	Stadium: Vicente Calderón; Attendance: 45,820; Referee: Carlos Clos Gómez; Man of the Match: Gaitán

22 January 2017 19	Athletic Bilbao	2–2	Atlético Madrid	Bilbao
16:15 CET (UTC+01:00)	Williams (yellow card) 36'; Lekue 42' de Marcos 56'; Iturraspe (yellow card) 63'	Report	Koke 3'; Gabi (yellow card) 47'; Carrasco (yellow card) 64'; Griezmann 80'; Giménez (yellow card) 90+3'	Stadium: San Mamés; Attendance: 44,457; Referee: Ignacio Iglesias Villanueva; Man of the Match: Filipe Luís

28 January 2017 20	Alavés	0–0	Atlético Madrid	Vitoria-Gasteiz
16:15 CET (UTC+01:00)	Llorente (yellow card) 54'; Deyverson (yellow card) 82'; M. García (yellow card) 90+4'	Report	Giménez (yellow card) 45'; Godín (yellow card) 90+4'	Stadium: Mendizorrotza; Attendance: 16,255; Referee: Daniel Ocón Arráiz; Man of the Match: Koke

4 February 2017 21	Atlético Madrid	2–0	Leganés	Madrid
18:30 CET (UTC+01:00)	Torres 15', 51'; Savić (yellow card) 32'	Report	Morán (yellow card) 30'	Stadium: Vicente Calderón; Attendance: 37,421; Referee: José María Sánchez Martínez; Man of the Match: Toress

12 February 2017 22	Atlético Madrid	3–2	Celta Vigo	Madrid
20:45 CET (UTC+01:00)	Torres 11'; Carrasco 86'; Griezmann 88'; Gabi (yellow card) 90+1'	Report	Cabral 5'; Guidetti (yellow card) 42', (goal) 78'; Jonny (yellow card) 74'	Stadium: Vicente Calderón; Attendance: 31,059; Referee: Alejandro Hernández Hernández; Man of the Match: Carrasco

18 February 2017 23	Sporting Gijón	1–4	Atlético Madrid	Gijón
13:00 CET (UTC+01:00)	Sergio 49'; Vesga (yellow card) 57'	Report	Carrasco 46'; Partey (yellow card) 72'; Gameiro 80', 81', 85'	Stadium: El Molinón; Attendance: 24,013; Referee: José González González; Man of the Match: Gameiro

26 February 2017 24	Atlético Madrid	1–2	Barcelona	Madrid
16:15 CET (UTC+01:00)	Saúl (yellow card) 56'; Savić (yellow card) 65'; Godín 70'; Gabi (yellow card) 73'; Correa (yellow card) 74'	Report	Busquets (yellow card) 55'; Rafinha 64'; Messi (yellow card) 82', (goal) 86'	Stadium: Vicente Calderón; Attendance: 52,440; Referee: Antonio Mateu Lahoz; Man of the Match: Neymar

2 March 2017 25	Deportivo La Coruña	1–1	Atlético Madrid	A Coruña
20:45 CET (UTC+01:00)	Andone 13', (yellow card) 14'; Luisinho (yellow card) 45'; Bergantiños (yellow card) 88'	Report	Griezmann 68'; Godín (yellow card) 74'	Stadium: Riazor; Attendance: 20,138; Referee: Carlos Clos Gómez; Man of the Match: Filipe Luís

5 March 2017 26	Atlético Madrid	3–0	Valencia	Madrid
16:15 CET (UTC+01:00)	Griezmann 10', 83'; Carrasco (yellow card) 30'; Gameiro 48'	Report	Pérez (yellow card) 20'; Mina (yellow card) 90+2'	Stadium: Vicente Calderón; Attendance: 46,439; Referee: Xavier Estrada Fernández; Man of the Match: Griezmann

11 March 2017 27	Granada	0–1	Atlético Madrid	Granada
20:45 CET (UTC+01:00)	Saunier (yellow card) 24'; Ingason (yellow card) 48'; Foulquier (yellow card) 68'; Wakaso (yellow card) 72' (yellow-red card) 90+4'	Report	Carrasco (yellow card) 57'; Juanfran (yellow card) 81'; Griezmann 84'; Godín (yellow card) 90+1'	Stadium: Nuevo Los Cármenes; Attendance: 18,960; Referee: Alejandro Hernández Hernández; Man of the Match: Filipe Luís

19 March 2017 28	Atlético Madrid	3–1	Sevilla	Madrid
16:15 CET (UTC+01:00)	Godín 37', (yellow card) 66'; Filipe Luís (yellow card) 40'; Carrasco (yellow card) 55'; Griezmann 61'; Koke 77'; Torres (yellow card) 82'	Report	Escudero (yellow card) 23'; Sarabia (yellow card) 47'; Mercado (yellow card) 60'; Correa 85'	Stadium: Vicente Calderón; Attendance: 49,544; Referee: Jesús Gil Manzano; Man of the Match: Griezmann

1 April 2017 29	Málaga	0–2	Atlético Madrid	Málaga
20:45 CEST (UTC+02:00)	Juan Carlos (yellow card) 76'; Recio (yellow card) 76'	Report	L. Hernandez (yellow card) 19'; Koke 26'; Savić (yellow card) 31'; Filipe Luís 74'	Stadium: La Rosaleda; Attendance: 27,082; Referee: Trujillo Suárez; Man of the Match: Filipe Luís

4 April 2017 30	Atlético Madrid	1–0	Real Sociedad	Madrid
20:45 CEST (UTC+02:00)	Filipe Luís 28'	Report	Rulli (yellow card) 61'; Yuri (yellow card) 62'; Zubeldia (yellow card) 63'; Raúl Navas (yellow card) 68'	Stadium: Vicente Calderón; Attendance: 43,130; Referee: Undiano Mallenco; Man of the Match: Filipe Luís

8 April 2017 31	Real Madrid	1–1	Atlético Madrid	Madrid
16:15 CEST (UTC+02:00)	Casemiro (yellow card) 37'; Pepe 52'; Carvajal (yellow card) 88'	Report	Saúl (yellow card) 52'; Godín (yellow card) 60'; Griezmann 85'; Koke (yellow card) 89'	Stadium: Santiago Bernabéu; Attendance: 77,344; Referee: Ricardo de Burgos Bengoetxea; Man of the Match: Pepe

15 April 2017 32	Atlético Madrid	3–0	Osasuna	Madrid
18:30 CEST (UTC+02:00)	Giménez (yellow card) 25'; Carrasco 30', 47'; Filipe Luís 61'	Report	Kenan Kodro (yellow card) 43'; Oier (yellow card) 54'; Sirigu (yellow card) 88'; Fuentes (yellow card) 90' de las Cuevas (yellow card) 90'	Stadium: Vicente Calderón; Attendance: 43,757; Referee: Melero López; Man of the Match: Giménez

22 April 2017 33	Espanyol	0–1	Atlético Madrid	Barcelona
20:45 CEST (UTC+02:00)	Caicedo (yellow card) 30'; Piatti (yellow card) 63'; Sánchez (yellow card) 90+2'	Report	Godín (yellow card) 27'; Saúl (yellow card) 57'; Griezmann 73'	Stadium: RCDE Stadium; Attendance: 27,205; Referee: Vicandi Garrido; Man of the Match: Giménez

25 April 2017 34	Atlético Madrid	0–1	Villarreal	Madrid
21:30 CEST (UTC+02:00)	Gabi (yellow card) 55'; Godín (yellow card) 90+1'	Report	Trigueros (yellow card) 58'; Rukavina (yellow card) 66'; Soldado (yellow card) 74'; Soriano 82'; Musacchio (yellow card) 88'; Jaume Costa (yellow card) 89'; Bakambu (yellow card) 90+4'	Stadium: Vicente Calderón; Attendance: 44,090; Referee: Ignacio Iglesias Villanueva; Man of the Match: Fernández

29 April 2017 35	Las Palmas	0–5	Atlético Madrid	Las Palmas
18:30 CEST (UTC+02:00)	Boateng (yellow card) 6' (yellow-red card) 65'; Jesé (yellow card) 32'; Halilović (yellow card) 56'	Report	Gameiro 2', 18'; Saúl (yellow card) 14', (goal) 17'; Savić (yellow card) 31'; Gaitán (yellow card) 61'; Partey 72', (yellow card) 89'; Torres 90+1'	Stadium: Gran Canaria; Attendance: 23,523; Referee: Ricardo de Burgos Bengoetxea; Man of the Match: Saúl

6 May 2017 36	Atlético Madrid	1–0	Eibar	Madrid
16:15 CEST (UTC+02:00)	Griezmann (yellow card) 15'; Filipe Luís (yellow card) 53'; Saúl 69'; Godín (yellow card) 89' (yellow-red card) 90+2'; Torres (yellow card) 90+4'	Report	Ramis (yellow card) 43'; Arbilla (yellow card) 52'; Dani García (yellow card) 90+2'	Stadium: Vicente Calderón; Attendance: 46,699; Referee: David Fernández Borbalán; Man of the Match: Saúl

14 May 2017 37	Betis	1–1	Atlético Madrid	Seville
20:00 CEST (UTC+02:00)	Brašanac (yellow card) 28'; Ceballos 57'; Petros (yellow card) 66'; Adán (yellow card) 67'; Álex Martínez (yellow card) 90+1'	Report	Filipe Luís (yellow card) 36'; Giménez (yellow card) 42'; Koke (yellow card) 55'; Savić (yellow card) 60', (goal) 66'	Stadium: Benito Villamarín; Attendance: 27,228; Referee: Álvarez Izquierdo; Man of the Match: Ceballos

21 May 2017 38	Atlético Madrid	3–1	Athletic Bilbao	Madrid
16:45 CEST (UTC+02:00)	Torres 8', 11'; Partey (yellow card) 38'; Gabi (yellow card) 45'; Correa 89'	Report	Williams 71'	Stadium: Vicente Calderón; Attendance: 52,155; Referee: Xavier Estrada Fernández; Man of the Match: Saúl

Source: Atlético Madrid.com

=== Copa del Rey ===
==== Round of 32 ====
30 November 2016 First leg	Guijuelo	0–6	Atlético Madrid	Villares de la Reina (Note: Guijuelo played their home match at El Helmántico, Villares de la Reina, instead of their regular stadium Estadio Municipal, Guijuelo.)
21:00 CET (UTC+01:00)	Héctor (yellow card) 30'	Report	Saúl 29' (pen.); Vrsaljko 45'; Carrasco 49', 53'; Correa 57'; Savić (yellow card) 61'; Roberto 85'	Stadium: Helmántico; Attendance: 15,528; Referee: Alberto Undiano Mallenco

20 December 2016 Second leg	Atlético Madrid	4–1 (10–1 agg.)	Guijuelo	Madrid
21:00 CET (UTC+01:00)	Gaitán 17'; Correa 22'; Juanfran 29'; Torres 45'; Partey (yellow card) 57'	Report	Ruiz (yellow card) 15' (yellow-red card) 33'; Martín (yellow card) 70'; Pino 80'	Stadium: Vicente Calderón; Attendance: 23,478; Referee: Xavier Estrada Fernández

==== Round of 16 ====
3 January 2017 First leg	Las Palmas	0–2	Atlético Madrid	Las Palmas
21:15 CET (UTC+01:00)	Boateng (yellow card) 81'; D. García (yellow card) 81'	Report	Koke 45', (yellow card) 30'; Gabi (yellow card) 47'; Griezmann 51'; Vrsaljko (yellow card) 47'	Stadium: Gran Canaria; Attendance: 26,032; Referee: Juan Martínez Munuera

10 January 2017 Second leg	Atlético Madrid	2–3 (4–3 agg.)	Las Palmas	Madrid
21:15 CET (UTC+01:00)	Correa (yellow card) 35', (goal) 61'; L. Hernandez (yellow card) 45'; Griezmann 49'; Gabi (yellow card) 81'	Report	Momo (yellow card) 50'; Livaja 57', 89'; M. García 90+3'	Stadium: Vicente Calderón; Attendance: 21,357; Referee: José María Sánchez Martínez

==== Quarter-finals ====
19 January 2017 First leg	Atlético Madrid	3–0	Eibar	Madrid
19:15 CET (UTC+01:00)	Griezmann 28'; Correa 60'; Saúl (yellow card) 63'; Gameiro 68'	Report	Escalante (yellow card) 27'; Rico (yellow card) 67'; Gálvez (yellow card) 85'	Stadium: Vicente Calderón; Attendance: 24,826; Referee: Antonio Mateu Lahoz

25 January 2017 Second leg	Eibar	2–2 (2–5 agg.)	Atlético Madrid	Eibar
19:15 CET (UTC+01:00)	Rico (yellow card) 15'; Bebé (yellow card) 60'; Enrich 73'; Pedro León 80'	Report	L. Hernandez (yellow card) 40'; Giménez 49'; Juanfran 85'	Stadium: Ipurua; Attendance: 4,000; Referee: Santiago Jaime Latre

==== Semi-finals ====
1 February 2017 First leg	Atlético Madrid	1–2	Barcelona	Madrid
21:00 CET (UTC+01:00)	Saúl (yellow card) 31'; Savić (yellow card) 39'; Griezmann 59', (yellow card) 75'; Gabi (yellow card) 84'; Juanfran (yellow card) 90+1'	Report	L. Suárez 7'; Messi 33', (yellow card) 90'; Neymar (yellow card) 64'; Mascherano (yellow card) 90+1'	Stadium: Vicente Calderón; Attendance: 48,124; Referee: Ricardo de Burgos Bengoetxea

7 February 2017 Second leg	Barcelona	1–1 (3–2 agg.)	Atlético Madrid	Barcelona
21:00 CET (UTC+01:00)	Roberto (yellow card) 19' (yellow-red card) 57'; L. Suárez 43' (yellow card) 87' (yellow-red card) 90'; Rakitić (yellow card) 66'; Cillessen (yellow card) 76'; Busquets (yellow card) 90+6'	Report	Carrasco (yellow card) 36' (yellow-red card) 69'; Savić (yellow card) 76'; Gameiro 83'; Filipe Luís (yellow card) 90+4'	Stadium: Camp Nou; Attendance: 67,734; Referee: Jesús Gil Manzano

=== UEFA Champions League ===
==== Group stage ====
Pos	Team	Pld	W	D	L	GF	GA	GD	Pts	Qualification	ATM	BAY	RST	PSV
1	(Spain) Atlético Madrid	6	5	0	1	7	2	+5	15	Advance to knockout phase	—	1–0	2–1	2–0
2	(Germany) Bayern Munich	6	4	0	2	14	6	+8	12	Advance to knockout phase	1–0	—	5–0	4–1
3	(Russia) Rostov	6	1	2	3	6	12	−6	5	Transfer to Europa League	0–1	3–2	—	2–2
4	(Netherlands) PSV Eindhoven	6	0	2	4	4	11	−7	2		0–1	1–2	0–0	—

Source: UEFA
Rules for classification: Group stage tiebreakers

13 September 2016 1	PSV Eindhoven (Netherlands)	0–1	(Spain) Atlético Madrid	Eindhoven, Netherlands
20:45 CEST (UTC+02:00)	Moreno (yellow card) 21'	Report	Gabi (yellow card) 30'; Saúl 43'; Giménez (yellow card) 45'	Stadium: Philips Stadion; Attendance: 33,989; Referee: Martin Atkinson (England)

28 September 2016 2	Atlético Madrid (Spain)	1–0	(Germany) Bayern Munich	Madrid, Spain
20:45 CEST (UTC+02:00)	Saúl (yellow card) 15'; Carrasco 35'	Report	Lahm (yellow card) 26'; Thiago (yellow card) 33'; Boateng (yellow card) 40'; Vidal (yellow card) 86'	Stadium: Vicente Calderón; Attendance: 48,242; Referee: Szymon Marciniak (Poland)

19 October 2016 3	Rostov (Russia)	0–1	(Spain) Atlético Madrid	Rostov-on-Don, Russia
20:45 CEST (UTC+02:00); 21:45 MSK (UTC+03:00)	Mevlja (yellow card) 28'	Report	Filipe Luís (yellow card) 4'; Carrasco 62'; Juanfran (yellow card) 70'	Stadium: Olimp-2; Attendance: 15,400; Referee: Daniele Orsato (Italy)

1 November 2016 4	Atlético Madrid (Spain)	2–1	(Russia) Rostov	Madrid, Spain
20:45 CET (UTC+01:00)	Griezmann 28', 90+3'; Godín (yellow card) 44'; Koke (yellow card) 46'; Filipe Luís (yellow card) 83'	Report	Azmoun 30', (yellow card) 58'; Kalachev (yellow card) 46'; Gațcan (yellow card) 68'; Dzhanayev (yellow card) 82'	Stadium: Vicente Calderón; Attendance: 40,392; Referee: Craig Thomson (Scotland)

23 November 2016 5	Atlético Madrid (Spain)	2–0	(Netherlands) PSV Eindhoven	Madrid, Spain
20:45 CET (UTC+01:00)	Gameiro 55'; Griezmann 66'	Report		Stadium: Vicente Calderón; Attendance: 37,891; Referee: Aleksei Kulbakov (Belarus)

6 December 2016 6	Bayern Munich (Germany)	1–0	(Spain) Atlético Madrid	Munich, Germany
20:45 CET (UTC+01:00)	Lewandowski 28'	Report	Gabi (yellow card) 41'	Stadium: Allianz Arena; Attendance: 70,000; Referee: Clément Turpin (France)

==== Knockout phase ====
===== Round of 16 =====
21 February 2017 First leg	Bayer Leverkusen (Germany)	2–4	(Spain) Atlético Madrid	Leverkusen, Germany
20:45 CET (UTC+01:00)	Henrichs (yellow card) 15'; Bellarabi 48'; Dragovic (yellow card) 58'; Wendell (yellow card) 64'; Savić 68' (o.g.); Aránguiz (yellow card) 74'	Report	Saúl 17'; Griezmann 25'; Gameiro 59' (pen.); Torres 86', (yellow card) 88'; Gabi (yellow card) 89'; Filipe Luís (yellow card) 90'	Stadium: BayArena; Attendance: 29,300; Referee: William Collum (Scotland)

15 March 2017 Second leg	Atlético Madrid (Spain)	0–0 (4–2 agg.)	(Germany) Bayer Leverkusen	Madrid, Spain
20:45 CET (UTC+01:00)	Giménez (yellow card) 66'; Gaitán (yellow card) 89'	Report	Jedvaj (yellow card) 64'; Baumgartlinger (yellow card) 71'	Stadium: Vicente Calderón; Attendance: 49,133; Referee: Sergei Karasev (Russia)

===== Quarter-finals =====
12 April 2017 First leg	Atlético Madrid (Spain)	1–0	(England) Leicester City	Madrid, Spain
20:45 CEST (UTC+02:00)	Griezmann 28' (pen.)	Report	Albrighton (yellow card) 27'; Benalouane (yellow card) 49'; Huth (yellow card) 58'	Stadium: Vicente Calderón; Attendance: 51,423; Referee: Jonas Eriksson (Sweden)

18 April 2017 Second leg	Leicester City (England)	1–1 (1–2 agg.)	(Spain) Atlético Madrid	Leicester, England
20:45 CEST (UTC+02:00)	Vardy 60'	Report	Saúl 25'	Stadium: King Power Stadium; Attendance: 31,548; Referee: Gianluca Rocchi (Italy)

===== Semi-finals =====
2 May 2017 First leg	Real Madrid (Spain)	3–0	(Spain) Atlético Madrid	Madrid, Spain
20:45 CEST (UTC+02:00)	Ronaldo 10', 73', 86'; Isco (yellow card) 48'	Report	Koke (yellow card) 26'; Saúl (yellow card) 53'; Savić (yellow card) 83'	Stadium: Santiago Bernabéu; Attendance: 77,609; Referee: Martin Atkinson (England)

10 May 2017 Second leg	Atlético Madrid (Spain)	2–1 (2–4 agg.)	(Spain) Real Madrid	Madrid, Spain
20:45 CEST (UTC+02:00)	Savić (yellow card) 6'; Saúl 12'; Griezmann 16' (pen.); Godín (yellow card) 34'; Gabi (yellow card) 37'; Correa (yellow card) 85'	Report	Danilo (yellow card) 4'; Ramos (yellow card) 34'; Isco 42'	Stadium: Vicente Calderón; Attendance: 53,422; Referee: Cüneyt Çakır (Turkey)

== Statistics ==
=== Squad statistics ===
Match played 21 May 2017.

No.	Pos.	Player	Total					La Liga					Copa del Rey					Champions League				
No.	Pos.	Player				Yellow card	Red card				Yellow card	Red card				Yellow card	Red card				Yellow card	Red card
1	GK	(Spain) Moyà	17	1	0	0	0	8	1	0	0	0	8	0	0	0	0	1	0	0	0	0
2	DF	(Uruguay) Godín	45	2	3	14	1	30	1	3	12	1	4	1	0	0	0	11	0	0	2	0
3	DF	(Brazil) Filipe Luís	48	0	3	9	0	34	0	3	5	0	4	0	0	1	0	10	0	0	3	0
5	MF	(Portugal) Tiago	6	9	1	2	0	5	7	1	2	0	0	0	0	0	0	1	2	0	0	0
6	MF	(Spain) Koke	53	1	5	11	1	36	0	4	8	1	5	1	1	1	0	12	0	0	2	0
7	FW	(France) Griezmann	53	0	26	4	0	36	0	16	3	0	5	0	4	1	0	12	0	6	0	0
8	MF	(Spain) Saúl	47	6	9	12	0	29	4	4	8	0	8	0	1	2	0	10	2	4	2	0
9	FW	(Spain) Torres	21	24	10	4	0	13	18	8	3	0	3	2	1	0	0	5	4	1	1	0
10	MF	(Belgium) Carrasco	42	11	14	7	1	27	8	10	5	0	4	2	2	2	1	11	1	2	0	0
11	FW	(Argentina) Correa	17	30	8	8	0	10	21	4	6	0	5	2	4	1	0	2	7	0	1	0
12	MF	(Argentina) Augusto	2	1	0	0	0	2	1	0	0	0	0	0	0	0	0	0	0	0	0	0
13	GK	(Slovenia) Oblak	41	0	0	1	0	30	0	0	1	0	0	0	0	0	0	11	0	0	0	0
14	MF	(Spain) Gabi	47	3	0	16	0	33	1	0	9	0	3	2	0	3	0	11	0	0	4	0
15	DF	(Montenegro) Savić	46	3	1	12	1	30	2	1	7	1	7	0	0	3	0	9	1	0	2	0
16	DF	(Croatia) Vrsaljko	21	4	1	2	0	11	3	0	1	0	5	1	1	1	0	5	0	0	0	0
17	MF	(Italy) Cerci	0	2	0	0	0	0	1	0	0	0	0	1	0	0	0	0	0	0	0	0
19	DF	(France) Hernandez	20	4	0	4	0	13	2	0	2	0	4	1	0	2	0	3	1	0	0	0
20	DF	(Spain) Juanfran	33	3	2	4	0	21	2	0	2	0	7	0	2	1	0	5	1	0	1	0
21	FW	(France) Gameiro	27	19	16	0	0	21	10	12	0	0	2	4	2	0	0	4	5	2	0	0
22	MF	(Ghana) Partey	10	14	1	6	0	7	9	1	5	0	2	0	0	1	0	1	5	0	0	0
23	MF	(Argentina) Gaitán	19	17	4	2	0	11	12	3	1	0	6	2	1	0	0	2	3	0	1	0
24	DF	(Uruguay) Giménez	23	6	1	7	0	12	5	0	5	0	5	1	1	0	0	6	0	0	2	0
25	GK	(Portugal) Moreira	0	0	0	0	0	0	0	0	0	0	0	0	0	0	0	0	0	0	0	0
27	MF	(Brazil) Caio Henrique^{1}	1	0	0	0	0	0	0	0	0	0	1	0	0	0	0	0	0	0	0	0
34	MF	(Spain) Olabe^{1}	0	1	0	0	0	0	0	0	0	0	0	1	0	0	0	0	0	0	0	0
39	MF	(Spain) Juan Moreno^{1}	0	1	0	0	0	0	0	0	0	0	0	1	0	0	0	0	0	0	0	0
42	FW	(Spain) Roberto^{1}	0	1	1	0	0	0	0	0	0	0	0	1	1	0	0	0	0	0	0	0
44	MF	(Albania) Keidi Bare^{1}	0	1	0	0	0	0	0	0	0	0	0	1	0	0	0	0	0	0	0	0
Own goals			–	–	1	–	–	–	–	0	–	–	–	–	0	–	–	–	–	0	–	–
TOTALS			–	–	106	122	4	–	–	70	83	3	–	–	21	19	1	–	–	15	21	0

^{1}Players from reserve team – Atlético Madrid B.

=== Goalscorers ===
As of matches played 21 May 2017.

Rank	No.	Pos.	Player	La Liga	Copa del Rey	Champions League	Total
1	7	FW	(France) Antoine Griezmann	16	4	6	26
2	21	FW	(France) Kevin Gameiro	12	2	2	16
3	10	MF	(Belgium) Yannick Carrasco	10	2	2	14
4	9	FW	(Spain) Fernando Torres	8	1	1	10
5	8	MF	(Spain) Saúl	4	1	4	9
6	11	FW	(Argentina) Ángel Correa	4	4	0	8
7	6	MF	(Spain) Koke	4	1	0	5
8	23	FW	(Argentina) Nicolás Gaitán	3	1	0	4
9	2	DF	(Uruguay) Diego Godín	3	0	0	3
9	3	DF	(Brazil) Filipe Luís	3	0	0	3
11	20	DF	(Spain) Juanfran	0	2	0	2
12	5	MF	(Portugal) Tiago	1	0	0	1
12	15	DF	(Montenegro) Stefan Savić	1	0	0	1
12	16	DF	(Croatia) Šime Vrsaljko	0	1	0	1
12	22	MF	(Ghana) Thomas Partey	1	0	0	1
12	24	DF	(Uruguay) José Giménez	0	1	0	1
12	42	FW	(Spain) Roberto Núñez Mañas^{1}	0	1	0	1
Own goals				0	0	1	1
TOTALS				70	21	15	106

^{1}Player from reserve team.

=== Hat-tricks ===
Player	Against	Result	Date	Competition	Report
(Belgium) Yannick Carrasco	Granada	7–1 (H)	15 October 2016	La Liga	Report
(France) Kevin Gameiro	Sporting	1–4 (A)	18 February 2017	La Liga	Report

=== Clean sheets ===
Match played 21 May 2017.

Rank	No.	Pos.	Player	Matches played	Clean sheet %	La Liga (%)	Cup (%)	Champions League (%)	Total
1	13	GK	(Slovenia) Jan Oblak	41	51%	15 (50%)	0 (0%)	6 (55%)	21
2	1	GK	(Spain) Miguel Ángel Moyà	18	44%	5 (62%)	3 (37%)	0 (0%)	8
3	25	GK	(Portugal) André Moreira	0	0%	0 (0%)	0 (0%)	0 (0%)	0
TOTALS				59	49%	20 (51%)	3 (37%)	6 (50%)	29

=== Attendances ===
	Matches	Attendances	Average	High	Low
La Liga	19	848,754	44,671	53,668	31,059
Cup	4	117,785	29,446	48,124	21,357
Champions League	6	280,503	46,751	53,422	37,891
Total	29	1.247,042	43,001	53,668	21,357

=== Awards ===
==== La Liga Player of the Month ====
- Antoine Griezmann named Liga Santander Player of the Month for September.
- Antoine Griezmann named Liga Santander Player of the Month for March.

==== La Liga Manager of the Month ====
- Diego Simeone named Liga Santander Manager of the Month for March.

==== Ricardo Zamora Trophy ====
- Jan Oblak awarded with Ricardo Zamora Trophy as a goalkeeper who has the lowest goals-to-game ratio for the 2016/17 season.
