= 2015–16 Atlético Madrid season =

85th season in existence of Atlético Madrid

Atlético Madrid
2015–16 season
- President: Enrique Cerezo
- Head coach: Diego Simeone
- Stadium: Vicente Calderón
- La Liga: 3rd
- Copa del Rey: Quarter-finals
- UEFA Champions League: Runners-up
- Top goalscorer: League: Antoine Griezmann (22); All: Antoine Griezmann (32)
- Highest home attendance: 51,933 (vs Real Madrid)
- Lowest home attendance: 29,737 (vs Real Sociedad)
- Average home league attendance: 43,201
Home colours	Away colours

The 2015–16 season was Atlético Madrid's 85th season in existence and the club's 79th season in La Liga, the top league of Spanish football. Atlético competed in La Liga, Copa del Rey and UEFA Champions League. The season for the club began on 25 July 2015 and ended on 28 May 2016.

== Kits ==
Supplier: Nike / First Sponsor: Plus500

Home	Home alt.	Away	Away alt. 1	Away alt. 2	Third

Goalkeeper 1	Goalkeeper 2	Goalkeeper 3

== Season overview ==
=== June ===
On 19 June, it was announced that Mario Mandžukić would sign for Juventus. On 22 June, the signing of Mandžukić for a fee of €19 million was officially confirmed. On 22 June, it was confirmed that Atlético were close to agreeing a deal to sign Luciano Vietto from Villarreal. It was also confirmed that Léo Baptistão would be loaned to Villarreal. On 23 June, the agent of Jackson Martínez confirmed that Atlético had agreed a €35 million deal with Porto. A few days later, Martínez confirmed that he was set to join Atlético. On 24 June, Atlético officially presented its new home kit for the 2015–16 season. On 30 June, Internazionale confirmed Miranda's move.

=== July ===
On 1 July, Atlético announced the departure of centre back Miranda to Italian Serie A club Internazionale. On 6 July, Arda Turan departed, signing for Liga rivals Barcelona for €34 million. On 7 July, Atlético official signed of Luciano Vietto from Villarreal. On 8 July, Atlético completed the transfer of centre back Toby Alderweireld to Tottenham Hotspur. On the same day, Atlético presented its away kit for the 2015–16 season. On 10 July, the club confirmed the signing of winger Yannick Carrasco from French club Monaco. On 14 July, the schedule for the 2015–16 La Liga season was released. On 20 July, Atlético reached an agreement with Fiorentina for the transfer of Montenegrin international centre back Stefan Savić. Two days later, both clubs officially confirmed that Mario Suárez has joined Fiorentina. Atlético also confirmed the signing of Bernard Mensah from Portuguese side Vitória de Guimarães; he was immediately loaned to Getafe for the entirety of the 2015–16 season. On 25 July, Atlético played its first friendly game of the pre-season, prevailing 2–0 over Numancia in the Jésus Gil Trophy; Lucas Hernandez and Ángel Correa both scored. On 28 July, Atlético confirmed the return of left back Filipe Luís after one year spent in the English Premier League with Chelsea. On the same day, Atlético played its second friendly game of the pre-season and won 2–0 against Real Oviedo, with goals Antoine Griezmann and Fernando Torres. On 29 July, Atlético, with 22 players, prepared to play two friendlies in Japan and China for the LFP World Challenge tour.

=== August ===
1 August marked the first match of the tour, in Japan, where Atlético defeated Sagan Tosu 4–1 in penalties, the club's third win of the pre-season. Its second, and last match, in Asia was played on 4 August in China, with Atlético defeating Shanghai SIPG 0–3 through an Antoine Griezmann goal and a double from Fernando Torres. After the tour, on 8 August, Atlético played three matches, the first two of which were 45-minute morning matches against Guadalajara (0–0) and Leganés, which handed Atlético its first pre-season defeat. In the day's third match, played in the evening, Atlético defeated Real Sociedad 2–0 through a goal by Markel Bergara and a strike by Griezmann. On 13 August, Atlético confirmed that Mexican striker Raúl Jiménez officially signed with Portuguese club Benfica. On 14 and 15 August, Atlético played its last two friendly matches of the pre-season, contending in the Ramón de Carranza Trophy. In the semi-finals, the club defeated Cádiz on penalties (2–4), advancing to the finals. Atlético then dispatched Real Betis with three goals from José Giménez, Jackson Martínez and Ángel Correa, thereby claiming the side's tenth Carranza Trophy. Atlético finished its pre-season with a record of 7–1–1, scoring 13 goals and conceding two.

In its first league match, on 22 August, Atlético beat Las Palmas 1–0 with goal from Griezmann. On 27 August, Atlético were drawn into Group C of the Champions League alongside Portuguese champions Benfica, Turkish champions Galatasaray and Kazakh champions Astana. The next day, the club reached an agreement with River Plate for the purchase of Matías Kranevitter. He was officially announced three days later, but he will join the club after playing 2015 FIFA Club World Cup.

Atlético won its second-straight Liga match after defeating Sevilla at the Sánchez Pizjuán 3–0, with goals from Koke, Gabi and Jackson Martínez. On 31 August, the last day of the summer transfer window, after a transfer request, Raúl García signed a four-year contract with Athletic Bilbao.

=== September ===
On 12 September, Atlético fell to Barcelona 1–2 at the Vicente Calderón, with Fernando Torres scoring for Atlético. On 15 September, Atlético played its first match in the Champions League group stage, winning 2–0 over Galatasaray, with two goals from Antoine Griezmann. With goals in the second-half from Ángel Correa and Fernando Torres, Atlético has achieved an important victory by closing a week against Eibar.

Three days later, Atlético beat Getafe through two Griezmann goals at the beginning and of the match. In its next match, however, Atlético suffered its second loss in La Liga at the hands of Villarreal, with a goal by Léo Baptistão deciding the match. In its second match in the Champions League, Atlético lost 1–2 at home to Benfica; the only goal scored from the home team came from Ángel Correa.

=== October ===
In the first Madrid Derby of the season, on 4 October at the Vicente Calderón, Karim Benzema gave Real Madrid the lead, only for Luciano Vietto to later equalize, salvaged a 1–1 draw for Atlético. On 16 October, Atlético was drawn in the round of 32 of the 2015–16 Copa del Rey against Reus.

On 18 October, Antoine Griezmann and Yannick Carrasco both scored to secure a 2–0 victory over Real Sociedad. On 21 October, Atlético played its third match of the Champions League group stage, defeating Astana 4–0. Saúl, Jackson Martínez, Óliver and a Denys Dedechko own goal secured all three points.

On 25 October, Jackson Martínez and Yannick Carrasco both scored to ensure a 2–1 win over Valencia. In the tenth round of league, on 30 October, Atlético played Deportivo. Tiago gave his team the lead, but Lucas Pérez levelled for Deportivo, with the match finishing in a 1–1 draw.

=== November ===
Matchday 4 for Atlético in the Champions League against Astana ended in a 0–0 away draw. Back in La Liga, on 8 November Atético defeated Sporting de Gijón 1–0 from an Antoine Griezmann goal in the 93rd minute. The side, on 22 November, then played a match against Real Betis, winning 0–1 away with a goal by Koke. With the win, the team moved to second in the Liga table.

A double from Griezmann—as in the first leg was enough to down Turkish side Galatasaray, 2–0, in the Champions League group stage at home, ensuring Atlético's progression to the round of 16. Griezmann then scored again as Atlético beat Espanyol at the Vicente Calderón, 1–0.

=== December ===
To begin its Copa del Rey campaign, Atlético played its first leg match away at Reus. Reus netted first through a Fran Carbià goal in the 30th minute, but Luciano Vietto and Saúl scored the match's next to goals, ensuring a 1–2 win. Atlético then beat Granada 0–2 away through goals from defender Diego Godín and Antoine Griezmann. This was the team's sixth-consecutive win.

Goals from Saúl and Vietto away against Benfica in the last matchday of the Champions League group stage ensured first place in Group C for Atlético, with the Portuguese club placing second. In La Liga, Aymeric Laporte put Athletic Bilbao ahead but just before half-time in Atlético's next match, only for Saúl to level it just before half-time. Griezmann, with a great goal, decided the match in the 76th minute to put the club at the top of the table after the 2–1 home win.

In Monday, on 14 December, was the draw for the round of 16 of the Champions League. The team will play against PSV.

After the first-leg win away at Reus in the Copa del Rey, Thomas scored the second leg's only goal for Atlético (1–0) to send the club through to the round of 16, 3–1 on aggregate. Away at Málaga on 20 December, however, Atlético lost 1–0 after Charles scored the match's only goal for Málaga. On 30 December, Atlético responded with an important 0–2 away win over Rayo Vallecano to finish the 2015 calendar year with goals from Ángel Correa and Antoine Griezmann.

=== January ===
On 1 January 2016, the first day of the winter transfer window, Atlético announced an agreement with Celta de Vigo for the transfer of Argentine midfielder Augusto Fernández. The new year for the team began with a 1–0 home victory against Levante; Thomas scored the only goal. On 4 January, Matías Kranevitter was presented as an Atlético player. He joined the team after his initial loan to River Plate.

The first leg of the Copa del Rey round of 16, played on 6 January, ended in a 1–1 draw with Rayo Vallecano. Rayo initially took the lead through Nacho, but midfielder Saúl tied it for Atlético in the 67th minute. The club followed-up with its third-straight Liga victory over Celta on 10 January. Antoine Griezmann and Yannick Carrasco both netted in the second half for Atlético to secure the 0–2 away victory at Balaídos.

In the second leg of the Copa del Rey's round of 16, played on 14 January, Atlético overwhelmed Rayo Vallecano 3–0 at the Vicente Calderón, securing a 4–1 aggregate victory and progression to the quarter-finals. Two goals from Antoine Griezmann and one strike from Ángel Correa secured the victory. Three days later, on 17 January, a great goal from Filipe Luís and double from Griezmann was enough to dispatch Las Palmas 0–3 away at the Gran Canaria. On 20 January, Atlético played-out a hard-fought 0–0 draw away at Celta in the first leg of the Copa del Rey quarter-finals.

In La Liga on 24 January, Sevilla held Atlético to a 0–0 draw at home. Despite goals from Antoine Griezmann and Ángel Correa, Atlético fell to Celta 2–3 in the away leg of the Copa del Rey quarter-finals, knocking the club out of the cup 2–3 on aggregate. In the next match, in La Liga on 30 January, Koke initially put Atlético ahead in the tenth minute in an away match at Barcelona, but first-half goals from Lionel Messi and Luis Suárez sent Atlético to its second-straight overall defeat. On 31 January, the final day of the January transfer window period, Atlético reached an agreement with Valencia for the loan of left back Guilherme Siqueira.

=== February ===
On 2 February, Atlético and Guangzhou Evergrande reached an agreement for the transfer of the Colombian striker Jackson Martínez for a €42 million transfer fee. Eibar take a lead at the start of the second half and shortly after, Giménez and Saúl scored the 2–1. Fernando Torres scored the final goal, which was his 100th goal as a player of Atlético. A goal from Torres at the start of the match was worth three points in Getafe The match between Atlético and Villarreal was ended without goals. In first round of the quarterfinals in Champions League Atlético couldn't beat a PSV Eindhoven. Match ended with 0–0. In second Madrid Derby Atlético won against Real Madrid; Griezmann scored.

=== March ===
Atlético opened the new month with a 3–0 victory against Real Sociedad with goals from Saúl, Greiezmann and an own goal. Goals from Griezmann, Carrasco and Torres decided the match a 3–1 victory over Valencia. Another victory with three goals scored by Atlético. Saúl, Griezmann and Corea sentenced Deportivo. The round of 16 of the Champions League decided in a penalty shootout and the team will be in the quarter-finals. On 18 March, in the draw for the quarter-finals of the Champions League, Atlético will face Barcelona. Griezmann scored, but the team couldn't add a victory over Sporting.

=== April ===
Atlético began April with a 5–1 over Betis, with two goals scored by Griezmann and one each for Fernando Torres, Juanfran and Thomas. Atlético then fell away to Barcelona 2–1 in first leg of the quarter-finals of the Champions League, with Torres scoring. Atlético then defeated Espanyol away at the Cornellà-El Prat, 3–1. Goals were scored from Torres, Griezmann and Koke. Two goals from Griezmann over Barcelona then put the team in the semi-finals of the Champions League. On 15 April, in the draw for the semi-finals of the Champions League, Atlético will face Bayern Munich. Koke, Fernando Torres and Correa scored against Granada. Atlético beat Athletic Bilbao with a goal by Torres. Correa decided the match over Málaga. Atlético won the first leg of the semi-final with goal by Saúl against Bayern Munich. Griezmann decided and scored in an important win against Rayo Vallecano.

=== May ===
On 3 May, Atlético progressed into the final of the Champions League, although was defeated by 1–2 in Munich, but the team won the tie on away goal. Griezmann scored.

Fernando Torres put the team ahead, but Levante finally won with 1–2.

Atlético won at home stadium over Celta at the last matchday of the league. Torres and Griezmann scored. The team finished in third position.

The season for Atletico Madrid ended on 28 May, with the Champions League final. The match ended with 1–1 after extra time, but Real Madrid won a 5–3 on penalties. Only goal for team scored Carrasco.

== Players ==
N	Pos.	Nat.	Name	Age	EU	Since	App	Goals	Ends	Transfer fee	Notes
1	GK	(Spain)	Miguel Ángel Moyà	32	EU	2014	42	0	2017	€3M	
2	DF	(Uruguay)	Diego Godín	30	Non-EU	2010	258	19	2019	€8M	Second nationality: (Spain)
3	DF	(Brazil)	Filipe Luís	30	Non-EU	2010–2014; 2015	225	6	2019	€16M	Second nationality: (Italy)
5	MF	(Portugal)	Tiago	35	EU	2011	213	18	2016	Free	
6	MF	(Spain)	Koke	24	EU	2009	269	23	2019	YS	
7	FW	(France)	Antoine Griezmann	25	EU	2014	107	57	2020	€30M	
8	MF	(Argentina)	Matías Kranevitter	23	Non-EU	2015	11	0	2020	€8M	Second nationality: (Italy)
9	FW	(Spain)	Fernando Torres (on loan from Milan)	32	EU	2001–2007; 2015	314	109	2016	Free	
10	MF	(Spain)	Óliver Torres	21	EU	2012	57	2	2018	YS	
12	MF	(Argentina)	Augusto Fernández	30	Non-EU	2016	21	0	2019	€6.5M	Second nationality: (Spain)
13	GK	(Slovenia)	Jan Oblak	23	EU	2014	72	0	2021	€16M	
14	MF	(Spain)	Gabi (captain)	32	EU	2004–2007; 2011	317	9	2017	€3M	
15	DF	(Montenegro)	Stefan Savić	25	Non-EU	2015	24	0	2020	€25M	
16	FW	(Argentina)	Ángel Correa	21	Non-EU	2014	36	8	2019	€7.5M	Second nationality: (France)
17	MF	(Spain)	Saúl	21	EU	2012	95	13	2020	YS	
18	DF	(Spain)	Jesús Gámez	31	EU	2014	37	0	2017	€2.5M	
19	DF	(France)	Lucas Hernandez	20	EU	2014	20	0	2019	YS	
20	DF	(Spain)	Juanfran	31	EU	2011	259	4	2018	€4.25M	
21	MF	(Belgium)	Yannick Carrasco	22	EU	2015	43	5	2020	€20M	
22	MF	(Ghana)	Thomas Partey	23	Non-EU	2013	23	3	2020	YS	
23	FW	(Argentina)	Luciano Vietto	22	Non-EU	2015	27	3	2020	€20M	Second nationality: (Italy)
24	DF	(Uruguay)	José Giménez	21	Non-EU	2013	67	3	2018	€0.9M	

- Last updated: 3 February 2016
- Source: Atlético Madrid
- Ordered by squad number.

Updated 8 June 2016.

== Technical staff ==
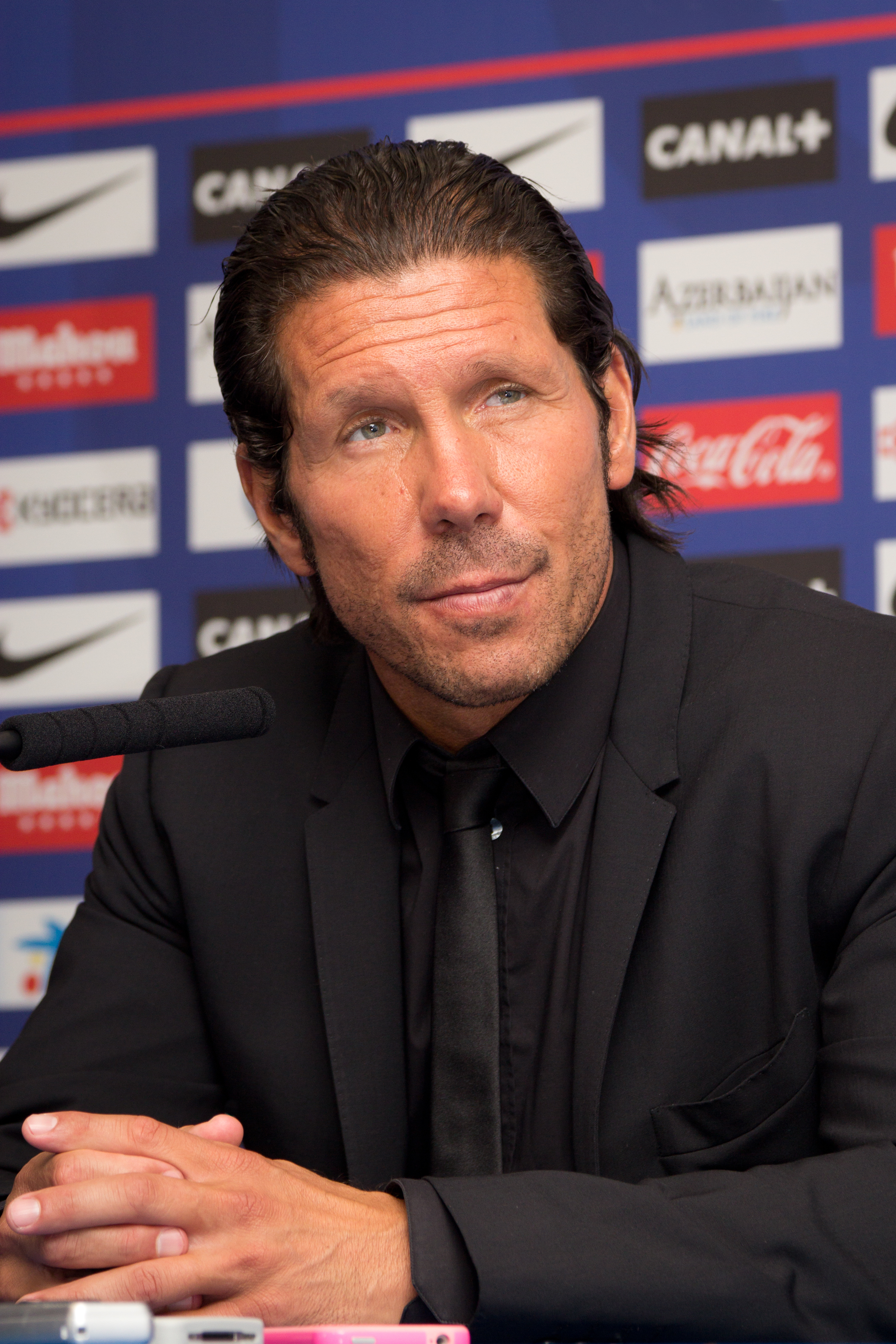
Diego Simeone

Position	Staff
Manager	(Argentina) Diego Simeone
Assistant coach	(Argentina) Germán Burgos
Assistant coach	(Spain) Juan Vizcaíno
Goalkeeper coach	(Argentina) Pablo Vercellone
Fitness coach	(Uruguay) Oscar Ortega
Fitness coach	(Spain) Carlos Menéndez
Fitness coach	(Spain) Iván Rafael Díaz Infante
Head of Medical Department	(Spain) José María Villalón
Club doctor	(Spain) Gorka de Abajo
Physiotherapist	(Spain) Jesús Vázquez
Physiotherapist	(Spain) Esteban Arévalo
Physiotherapist	(Spain) David Loras
Physiotherapist	(Spain) Felipe Iglesias Arroyo
Rehabilitation Physio	(Spain) Daniel Castro

Source: Atlético Madrid

== Transfers ==
=== In ===
No.	Pos.	Nat.	Name	Age	EU	Moving from	Type	Transfer window	Ends	Transfer fee	Source
	LB	(Argentina)	Emiliano Insúa	26	Non-EU	Rayo Vallecano	Loan Return	Summer			
	CF	(Brazil)	Léo Baptistão	22	Non-EU	Rayo Vallecano	Loan Return	Summer			
	RB	(Portugal)	Sílvio	27	EU	(Portugal) Benfica	Loan Return	Summer			
	MF	(Spain)	Óliver Torres	20	EU	(Portugal) Porto	Loan Return	Summer			
	RB	(Tunisia)	Kader	23	Non-EU	Numancia	Loan Return	Summer			
	CB	(Uruguay)	Emiliano Velázquez	21	Non-EU	Getafe	Loan Return	Summer			
	CF	(Spain)	Borja	22	EU	Zaragoza	Loan Return	Summer			
	GK	(Morocco)	Yassine Bounou	24	Non-EU	Zaragoza	Loan Return	Summer			
	CB	(Belgium)	Toby Alderweireld	26	EU	(England) Southampton	Loan Return	Summer			
	CM	(Spain)	Rubén Pérez	26	EU	Granada	Loan Return	Summer			
	LW	(Uruguay)	Cristian Rodríguez	29	Non-EU	(Brazil) Grêmio	Loan Return	Summer			
	DM	(Ghana)	Thomas	22	Non-EU	Almería	Loan Return	Summer			
	GK	(Portugal)	André Moreira	19	EU	(Portugal) Moreirense	Loan Return	Summer			
	DF	(Spain)	Javier Manquillo	21	EU	(England) Liverpool	Loan Return	Summer			Atlético.com
	ST	(Colombia)	Jackson Martínez	28	Non-EU	(Portugal) Porto	Transfer	Summer	2019	€35M	Atlético.com
	DF	(Montenegro)	Stefan Savić	24	Non-EU	(Italy) Fiorentina	Transfer	Summer	2020	€25M	Atlético.com
	MF	(Belgium)	Yannick Carrasco	21	EU	(France) Monaco	Transfer	Summer	2020	€20M	Atlético.com
	ST	(Argentina)	Luciano Vietto	21	Non-EU	Villarreal	Transfer	Summer	2020	€20M	Atlético.com
	LB	(Brazil)	Filipe Luís	29	Non-EU	(England) Chelsea	Transfer	Summer	2019	€16M	Chelsea FC
	MF	(Ghana)	Bernard Mensah	20	Non-EU	(Portugal) Vitória de Guimarães	Transfer	Summer	2021	€10M	Atlético.com
	MF	(Argentina)	Matías Kranevitter	22	Non-EU	(Argentina) River Plate	Transfer	Summer	2020	€8M	Atlético.com
	ST	(Colombia)	Rafael Santos Borré	19	Non-EU	(Colombia) Deportivo Cali	Transfer	Summer	2021	€5,5M	Atlético.com
	MF	(Argentina)	Matías Kranevitter	22	Non-EU	(Argentina) River Plate	Loan Return	Winter	2020		
	MF	(Argentina)	Augusto Fernández	29	Non-EU	Celta Vigo	Transfer	Winter	2019	€6.5M	Atlético.com

=== Out ===
No.	Pos.	Nat.	Name	Age	EU	Moving to	Type	Transfer window	Transfer fee	Source
	LB	(Argentina)	Cristian Ansaldi	28	Non-EU	(Russia) Zenit Saint Petersburg	End of loan	Summer		
	LW	(Spain)	Cani	33	EU	Villarreal	End of loan	Summer		
	CF	(Brazil)	Léo Baptistão	22	Non-EU	Villarreal	Loan	Summer		Atlético.com
	RB	(Portugal)	Sílvio	27	EU	(Portugal) Benfica	Loan	Summer		Atlético.com
	GK	(Portugal)	André Moreira	19	EU	(Portugal) União da Madeira	Loan	Summer		Zerozero.pt (in Portuguese)
	CB	(Uruguay)	Emiliano Velázquez	21	Non-EU	Getafe	Loan	Summer		MundoDeportivo.com (in Spanish)
	GK	(Morocco)	Yassine Bounou	24	EU	Zaragoza	Loan	Summer		Atlético.com
	MF	(Ghana)	Bernard Mensah	20	Non-EU	Getafe	Loan	Summer		Atlético.com
	RB	(Spain)	Javier Manquillo	21	EU	(France) Marseille	Loan	Summer		Atlético.com
	CF	(Spain)	Borja	22	EU	Eibar	Loan	Summer		Atlético.com
	MF	(Argentina)	Matías Kranevitter	22	Non-EU	(Argentina) River Plate	Loan	Summer		
	ST	(Colombia)	Rafael Santos Borré	19	Non-EU	(Colombia) Deportivo Cali	Loan	Summer		
	CB	(Brazil)	Miranda	30	Non-EU	(Italy) Internazionale	Transfer	Summer	€3M	Inter.it
	LB	(Argentina)	Emiliano Insúa	26	Non-EU	(Germany) VfB Stuttgart	Transfer	Summer	Free	VfB Stuttgart; Atlético.com
	MF	(Uruguay)	Cristian Rodríguez	29	Non-EU	(Argentina) Independiente	Transfer	Summer	Free	
	RB	(Tunisia)	Kader	23	Non-EU	(Tunisia) Club Africain	Transfer	Summer	Free	
	MF	(Spain)	Rubén Pérez	26	EU	Granada	Transfer	Summer	Undisclosed	Atlético.com
	MF	(Turkey)	Arda Turan	28	EU	Barcelona	Transfer	Summer	€34M	Fcbarcelona.com
	ST	(Croatia)	Mario Mandžukić	29	EU	(Italy) Juventus	Transfer	Summer	€19M	Juventus.com
	DF	(Belgium)	Toby Alderweireld	26	EU	(England) Tottenham Hotspur	Transfer	Summer	€16M	Tottenhamhotspur.com; Atlético.com
	MF	(Spain)	Mario Suárez	28	EU	(Italy) Fiorentina	Transfer	Summer	€15M	Atlético.com
	ST	(Mexico)	Raúl Jiménez	24	Non-EU	(Portugal) Benfica	Transfer	Summer	€9M	Atlético.com
	MF	(Spain)	Raúl García	29	EU	Athletic Bilbao	Transfer	Summer	€8M	Atlético.com
	DF	(Brazil)	Guilherme Siqueira	29	Non-EU	Valencia	Loan	Winter		Atlético.com
	FW	(Colombia)	Jackson Martínez	29	Non-EU	(China) Guangzhou Evergrande	Transfer	Winter	€42M	Atlético.com

== Pre-season and friendlies ==
Win Draw Loss

25 July 2015 1	Numancia	0–2	Atlético Madrid	Burgo de Osma, Spain
19:00 (UTC+2)		Report	Hernandez 53'; Correa 54'	Stadium: El Plantío; Referee: Víctor Laín

28 July 2015 2	Oviedo	0–2	Atlético Madrid	Nuevo Carlos Tartiere, Spain
20:00 (UTC+2)		Report	Griezmann 28'; F. Torres 69'	Stadium: Carlos Tartiere; Attendance: 11,000; Referee: Rodríguez García

1 August 2015 3	Sagan Tosu	1–1 (1–4 p)	Atlético Madrid	Tosu, Japan
19:00 (UTC+9); 12:00 (UTC+2)	Savić 82' (o.g.)	Report	Koke 18'	Stadium: Tosu Stadium; Attendance: 25,000; Referee: Masaaki Iemoto; Man of the Match: Koke
	Penalties
	Kamada (penalty missed); Tamura (penalty missed); Kobayashi (penalty scored)		(penalty scored) Griezmann; (penalty scored) Gabi; (penalty scored) Tiago; (penalty scored) Vietto

4 August 2015 4	Shanghai SIPG	0–3	Atlético Madrid	Shanghai, China
19:00 (UTC+8); 13:00 (UTC+2)		Report	Griezmann 9', 25'; F. Torres 46'	Stadium: Shanghai Stadium; Referee: Zhe Wang; Man of the Match: Griezmann

8 August 2015 5	Atlético Madrid	0–0	Guadalajara	Leganés, Spain
9:30 (UTC+2)		Report		Stadium: Butarque; Attendance: 3,000; Referee: Pizarro Gómez
Note: The match was only 45 minutes.

8 August 2015 6	Leganés	1–0	Atlético Madrid	Leganés, Spain
10:30 (UTC+2)	Gabriel 25'	Report		Stadium: Butarque; Attendance: 4,000; Referee: Pizarro Gómez
Note: The match was only 45 minutes.

8 August 2015 7	Atlético Madrid	2–0	Real Sociedad	Alicante, Spain
22:00 (UTC+2)	Bergara 16' (o.g.); Griezmann 75'	Report		Stadium: José Rico Pérez; Attendance: 15,000; Referee: Juan Martínez Munuera

14 August 2015 8	Cádiz	0–0 (2–4 p)	Atlético Madrid	Cádiz, Spain
22:00 (UTC+2)		Report		Stadium: Ramón de Carranza; Attendance: 10,000; Referee: Juan Peña Varela
	Penalties
	Canario (penalty missed); Quintana (penalty scored); Á. García (penalty scored); Salvi (penalty missed)		(penalty scored) García; (penalty scored) F. Torres; (penalty scored) Gabi; (penalty scored) Saúl

15 August 2015 9	Atlético Madrid	3–0	Real Betis	Cádiz, Spain
22:00 (UTC+2)	Giménez 73'; Martínez 87'; Correa 90+1'	Report		Stadium: Ramón de Carranza; Referee: David Fernández Borbalán

== Competitions ==
Win Draw Loss

=== La Liga ===
==== League table ====
Pos	Team	Pld	W	D	L	GF	GA	GD	Pts	Qualification or relegation
1	Barcelona (C)	38	29	4	5	112	29	+83	91	Qualification for the Champions League group stage
2	Real Madrid	38	28	6	4	110	34	+76	90	Qualification for the Champions League group stage
3	Atlético Madrid	38	28	4	6	63	18	+45	88	Qualification for the Champions League group stage
4	Villarreal	38	18	10	10	44	35	+9	64	Qualification for the Champions League play-off round
5	Athletic Bilbao	38	18	8	12	58	45	+13	62	Qualification for the Europa League group stage (Note: Since the winners of the 2015–16 Copa del Rey, Barcelona, qualified for European competition based on league position, the spot awarded to the cup winners (Europa League group stage) was passed to the sixth-placed team and the spot awarded to the sixth-placed team (Europa League third qualifying round) was passed to the seventh-placed team.)

Source: La Liga, Soccerway
Rules for classification: 1) Points; 2) Head-to-head points; 3) Head-to-head goal difference; 4) Goal difference; 5) Goals scored; 6) Fair-play points; 7) Play-off.
(C) Champions

==== Results by round ====
Round	1	2	3	4	5	6	7	8	9	10	11	12	13	14	15	16	17	18	19	20	21	22	23	24	25	26	27	28	29	30	31	32	33	34	35	36	37	38
Ground	H	A	H	A	H	A	H	A	H	A	H	A	H	A	H	A	A	H	A	A	H	A	H	A	H	A	H	A	H	A	H	A	H	A	H	H	A	H
Result	W	W	L	W	W	L	D	W	W	D	W	W	W	W	W	L	W	W	W	W	D	L	W	W	D	W	W	W	W	L	W	W	W	W	W	W	L	W
Position	3	3	6	5	4	5	5	4	3	4	3	2	2	2	2	2	2	1	1	1	2	2	2	2	2	2	2	2	2	2	2	2	2	2	2	2	3	3

Updated to match(es) played on 14 May 2016. Source: Competitive matches
A = Away; H = Home; W = Win; D = Draw; L = Loss

==== Matches ====
22 August 2015 1	Atlético Madrid	1–0	Las Palmas	Madrid
20:30 CEST (UTC+02:00)	Griezmann 16'; Juanfran (yellow card) 57'; F. Torres (yellow card) 84'	Report		Stadium: Vicente Calderón; Attendance: 39,735; Referee: Eduardo Prieto Iglesias

30 August 2015 2	Sevilla	0–3	Atlético Madrid	Seville
20:30 CEST (UTC+02:00)	Banega (yellow card) 20'; Krychowiak (yellow card) 20'; Konoplyanka (yellow card) 77'	Report	Koke 35'; Tiago (yellow card) 43'; Godín (yellow card) 44'; Griezmann (yellow card) 46'; Gabi 78'; Juanfran (yellow card) 80'; Martínez 85'	Stadium: Ramón Sánchez Pizjuán; Attendance: 38,986; Referee: Carlos Clos Gómez

12 September 2015 3	Atlético Madrid	1–2	Barcelona	Madrid
20:30 CEST (UTC+02:00)	Ó. Torres (yellow card) 18'; Filipe Luís (yellow card) 43'; F. Torres 51'; Giménez (yellow card) 89'	Report	Iniesta (yellow card) 44'; Neymar 55'; Messi 77'	Stadium: Vicente Calderón; Attendance: 51,691; Referee: Antonio Mateu Lahoz

19 September 2015 4	Eibar	0–2	Atlético Madrid	Eibar
20:30 CEST (UTC+02:00)	García (yellow card) 29'; Escalante (yellow card) 66'	Report	Correa 62', (yellow card) 67'; F. Torres 77'	Stadium: Ipurua; Attendance: 5,128; Referee: Alejandro Hernández Hernández

22 September 2015 5	Atlético Madrid	2–0	Getafe	Madrid
20:00 CEST (UTC+02:00)	Siqueira (yellow card) 2'; Griezmann 4', 90'; Gabi (yellow card) 40'; Tiago (yellow card) 72'	Report	Alexis (yellow card) 35'; Lafita (yellow card) 79'	Stadium: Vicente Calderón; Attendance: 37,077; Referee: Alfonso Álvarez Izquierdo

26 September 2015 6	Villarreal	1–0	Atlético Madrid	Vilarreal
20:30 CEST (UTC+02:00)	Baptistão 14'; Soldado (yellow card) 51'; Costa (yellow card) 84'	Report	Griezmann (yellow card) 41'; Tiago (yellow card) 71'	Stadium: El Madrigal; Attendance: 20,087; Referee: David Fernández Borbalán

4 October 2015 7	Atlético Madrid	1–1	Real Madrid	Madrid
20:30 CEST (UTC+02:00)	Gabi (yellow card) 17'; Griezmann (penalty missed) 22', (yellow card) 82'; Correa (yellow card) 39'; Juanfran (yellow card) 60'; Vietto (yellow card) 79', (goal) 83'; Godín (yellow card) 88'	Report	Benzema 9'; Ramos (yellow card) 21'; Varane (yellow card) 59'; Casemiro (yellow card) 61'; Arbeloa (yellow card) 89'	Stadium: Vicente Calderón; Attendance: 51,933; Referee: Alberto Undiano Mallenco

18 October 2015 8	Real Sociedad	0–2	Atlético Madrid	San Sebastián
16:00 CEST (UTC+02:00)	Bergara (yellow card) 26'; De la Bella (yellow card) 34'; Reyes (yellow card) 88' (yellow-red card) 89'; Pardo (yellow card) 90+2'; Jonathas (yellow card) 90+2' (yellow-red card) 90+2'; Rulli (yellow card) 90+2'	Report	Giménez (yellow card) 6'; Griezmann 9'; Correa (yellow card) 16'; Godín (yellow card) 24'; Filipe Luís (yellow card) 50'; Gabi (yellow card) 90'; Carrasco 90+1'	Stadium: Anoeta; Attendance: 25,644; Referee: Ignacio Iglesias Villanueva

25 October 2015 9	Atlético Madrid	2–1	Valencia	Madrid
20:30 CET (UTC+01:00)	Martínez 32'; Carrasco 40', (yellow card) 52'; Juanfran (yellow card) 80'; Correa (yellow card) 87'; Gabi (yellow card) 90+3'	Report	Mustafi (yellow card) 15'; Parejo (yellow card) 53'; Pérez (yellow card) 64'; Alcácer 72' (pen.); Gomes (yellow card) 84'	Stadium: Vicente Calderón; Attendance: 47,075; Referee: Jesús Gil Manzano

30 October 2015 10	Deportivo La Coruña	1–1	Atlético Madrid	A Coruña
20:30 CET (UTC+01:00)	Fajr (yellow card) 15'; Pérez 77'; Cartabia (yellow card) 90'	Report	Tiago 34'	Stadium: Riazor; Attendance: 24,608; Referee: Pedro Pérez Montero

8 November 2015 11	Atlético Madrid	1–0	Sporting Gijón	Madrid
18:15 CET (UTC+01:00)	Carrasco (yellow card) 32'; Koke (yellow card) 39'; Filipe Luís (yellow card) 55'; Godín (yellow card) 57'; Griezmann 90+3'	Report	Espinosa (yellow card) 40'; Cases (yellow card) 43'; Cuéllar (yellow card) 69'	Stadium: Vicente Calderón; Attendance: 44,858; Referee: Xavier Estrada Fernández

22 November 2015 12	Real Betis	0–1	Atlético Madrid	Seville
20:30 CET (UTC+01:00)	Bruno (yellow card) 53'	Report	Koke 7'; Filipe Luís (yellow card) 9'; Tiago (yellow card) 27'; Gámez (yellow card) 38'; Gabi (yellow card) 77'	Stadium: Benito Villamarín; Attendance: 41,976; Referee: Santiago Jaime Latre

28 November 2015 13	Atlético Madrid	1–0	Espanyol	Madrid
18:15 CET (UTC+01:00)	Griezmann 3'	Report	Álvaro (yellow card) 39'; Diop (yellow card) 43'; J. López (yellow card) 84'; Fuentes (yellow card) 90+4'	Stadium: Vicente Calderón; Attendance: 44,893; Referee: Iñaki Vicandi Garrido

5 December 2015 14	Granada	0–2	Atlético Madrid	Granada
18:15 CET (UTC+01:00)	Foulquier (yellow card) 19'; Rico (yellow card) 28'	Report	Godín 20'; Saúl (yellow card) 40'; Griezmann 76'	Stadium: Los Cármenes; Attendance: 15,872; Referee: Eduardo Prieto Iglesias

13 December 2015 15	Atlético Madrid	2–1	Athletic Bilbao	Madrid
18:15 CET (UTC+01:00)	Saúl 45+2'; Griezmann 67'; Gabi (yellow card) 85'	Report	Laporte 27'; Aduriz (yellow card) 74'	Stadium: Vicente Calderón; Attendance: 44,417; Referee: Juan Martínez Munuera

20 December 2015 16	Málaga	1–0	Atlético Madrid	Málaga
20:30 CET (UTC+01:00)	Albentosa (yellow card) 45'; Charles (yellow card) 45', (goal) 86'; Rosales (yellow card) 74'	Report	Filipe Luís (yellow card) 20'; Vietto (yellow card) 21'; Carrasco (yellow card) 45'; Gabi (yellow card) 51' (yellow-red card) 56'; Partey (yellow card) 83'	Stadium: La Rosaleda; Attendance: 19,086; Referee: Antonio Mateu Lahoz

30 December 2015 17	Rayo Vallecano	0–2	Atlético Madrid	Madrid
18:15 CET (UTC+01:00)	Yoel (yellow card) 32'; Llorente (yellow card) 69'; Castro (yellow card) 80'	Report	F. Torres (yellow card) 44'; Gámez (yellow card) 72'; Giménez (yellow card) 74'; Correa 88'; Griezmann 90'	Stadium: Campo de Vallecas; Attendance: 12,315; Referee: José María Sánchez Martínez

2 January 2016 18	Atlético Madrid	1–0	Levante	Madrid
20:30 CET (UTC+01:00)	Partey 81'	Report	García (yellow card) 61'; Xumetra (yellow card) 61'; Feddal (yellow card) 90+3'; Verza (yellow card) 90+4'	Stadium: Vicente Calderón; Attendance: 37,461; Referee: Carlos Clos Gómez

10 January 2016 19	Celta Vigo	0–2	Atlético Madrid	Vigo
20:30 CET (UTC+01:00)	Hernández (yellow card) 63'; Radoja (yellow card) 67'	Report	Filipe Luís (yellow card) 36'; Griezmann 49'; Carrasco 80'	Stadium: Balaídos; Attendance: 13,550; Referee: Ricardo de Burgos Bengoetxea

17 January 2016 20	Las Palmas	0–3	Atlético Madrid	Las Palmas
18:15 CET (UTC+01:00)		Report	Filipe Luís 17'; Fernández (yellow card) 40'; Griezmann 68', 89'; Giménez (yellow card) 70'	Stadium: Gran Canaria; Attendance: 28,515; Referee: Iñaki Vicandi Garrido

24 January 2016 21	Atlético Madrid	0–0	Sevilla	Madrid
16:00 CET (UTC+01:00)	Fernández (yellow card) 5'; Carrasco (yellow card) 63'; Correa (yellow card) 86'; Filipe Luís (yellow card) 87'; Gabi (yellow card) 90+1'	Report	Vitolo (yellow card) 32' (yellow-red card) 61'; Llorente (yellow card) 35'; Carriço (yellow card) 68'; Rico (yellow card) 82'	Stadium: Vicente Calderón; Attendance: 49,946; Referee: Ignacio Iglesias Villanueva

30 January 2016 22	Barcelona	2–1	Atlético Madrid	Barcelona
16:00 CET (UTC+01:00)	Messi 30'; Suárez 38'	Report	Koke 10'; Godín (yellow card) 24' (red card) 65'; Gabi (yellow card) 25'; Juanfran (yellow card) 41'; Filipe Luís (red card) 44'; Partey (yellow card) 90+2'	Stadium: Camp Nou; Attendance: 93,011; Referee: Alberto Undiano Mallenco

6 February 2016 23	Atlético Madrid	3–1	Eibar	Madrid
16:00 CET (UTC+01:00)	Partey (yellow card) 16'; Giménez 56'; Saúl 63'; Griezmann (yellow card) 85'; F. Torres 90+1'	Report	Keko 46', (yellow card) 67'; Lillo (yellow card) 86'; Juncà (yellow card) 88'	Stadium: Vicente Calderón; Attendance: 39,979; Referee: David Fernández Borbalán

14 February 2016 24	Getafe	0–1	Atlético Madrid	Getafe
18:15 CET (UTC+01:00)	Sarabia (yellow card) 32'; Pedro León (yellow card) 40'	Report	F. Torres 2'; Koke (yellow card) 44'; Gabi (yellow card) 65'; Giménez (yellow card) 67'	Stadium: Coliseum Alfonso Pérez; Attendance: 8,463; Referee: Antonio Mateu Lahoz

21 February 2016 25	Atlético Madrid	0–0	Villarreal	Madrid
20:30 CET (UTC+01:00)	Gabi (yellow card) 69'; Filipe Luís (yellow card) 73'	Report	Castillejo (yellow card) 62'; Bailly (yellow card) 77'	Stadium: Vicente Calderón; Attendance: 41,106; Referee: Eduardo Prieto Iglesias

27 February 2016 26	Real Madrid	0–1	Atlético Madrid	Madrid
16:00 CET (UTC+01:00)	Vázquez (yellow card) 62'; Carvajal (yellow card) 90+1'; Ramos (yellow card) 90+2'	Report	Godín (yellow card) 31'; Filipe Luís (yellow card) 37'; Griezmann 53'; Giménez (yellow card) 72'; Correa (yellow card) 90+1'	Stadium: Santiago Bernabéu; Attendance: 79,436; Referee: Carlos Clos Gómez

1 March 2016 27	Atlético Madrid	3–0	Real Sociedad	Madrid
21:00 CET (UTC+01:00)	Reyes 8' (o.g.); Saúl 46'; Griezmann 61' (pen.); Fernández (yellow card) 74'	Report	Jonathas (yellow card) 4'; Granero (yellow card) 58'	Stadium: Vicente Calderón; Attendance: 29,737; Referee: Alejandro Hernández Hernández

6 March 2016 28	Valencia	1–3	Atlético Madrid	Valencia
20:30 CET (UTC+01:00)	Cheryshev 28'; Santos (yellow card) 57' (yellow-red card) 80'; Feghouli (yellow card) 78'	Report	Griezmann 24'; Vietto (yellow card) 64'; F. Torres 72'; Carrasco 85'	Stadium: Mestalla; Attendance: 40,857; Referee: Alfonso Álvarez Izquierdo

12 March 2016 29	Atlético Madrid	3–0	Deportivo La Coruña	Madrid
20:30 CET (UTC+01:00)	Saúl 18'; Carrasco (yellow card) 41'; Griezmann 60'; Correa 83'	Report	Laure (yellow card) 90+2'	Stadium: Vicente Calderón; Attendance: 38,943; Referee: Mario Melero López

19 March 2016 30	Sporting Gijón	2–1	Atlético Madrid	Gijón
16:00 CET (UTC+01:00)	Sanabria (yellow card) 37', (goal) 79'; Álvarez (yellow card) 65'; Pérez (yellow card) 67'; Cases (yellow card) 85'; López (yellow card) 87'; Castro 89'	Report	Griezmann 29'; Gámez (yellow card) 52'; Juanfran (yellow card) 77'	Stadium: El Molinón; Attendance: 24,860; Referee: Jesús Gil Manzano

2 April 2016 31	Atlético Madrid	5–1	Real Betis	Madrid
16:00CEST (UTC+02:00)	F. Torres 37'; Griezmann 41', 81'; Koke (yellow card) 38'; Juanfran 65'; Partey 90+1'	Report	Pezzella (yellow card) 61'; Kadir (yellow card) 62'; Torres (yellow card) 74'; Castro 79'	Stadium: Vicente Calderón; Attendance: 46,506; Referee: Alejandro Hernández Hernández

9 April 2016 32	Espanyol	1–3	Atlético Madrid	Cornellà de Llobregat
18:15 CEST (UTC+02:00)	Sánchez (yellow card) 4'; Diop 29', (yellow card) 45'	Report	F. Torres 35'; Griezmann 58'; Filipe Luís (yellow card) 70'; Correa (yellow card) 78'; Koke 89'	Stadium: Cornellà-El Prat; Attendance: 26,338; Referee: Ricardo de Burgos Bengoetxea

17 April 2016 33	Atlético Madrid	3–0	Granada	Madrid
16:00 CEST (UTC+02:00)	Koke 15'; Gabi (yellow card) 50'; F. Torres 59'; Fernández (yellow card) 81'; Correa 83'; Ó. Torres (yellow card) 88'	Report	Doucouré (yellow card) 28'; Peñaranda (yellow card) 38'; Biraghi (yellow card) 46'; Barral (yellow card) 73'; Rochina (yellow card) 74'	Stadium: Vicente Calderón; Attendance: 47,656; Referee: Eduardo Prieto Iglesias

20 April 2016 34	Athletic Bilbao	0–1	Atlético Madrid	Bilbao
20:45 CEST (UTC+02:00)		Report	F. Torres 38'	Stadium: San Mamés; Attendance: 44,474; Referee: Juan Martínez Munuera

23 April 2016 35	Atlético Madrid	1–0	Málaga	Madrid
18:15 CEST (UTC+02:00)	Giménez (yellow card) 54'; F. Torres (yellow card) 57'; Correa 62'; Filipe Luís (yellow card) 82'	Report	Charles (yellow card) 25'; Weligton (yellow card) 29'; Recio (yellow card) 90'	Stadium: Vicente Calderón; Attendance: 44,396; Referee: Antonio Mateu Lahoz

30 April 2016 36	Atlético Madrid	1–0	Rayo Vallecano	Madrid
18:15 CEST (UTC+02:00)	Griezmann 55'; Kranevitter (yellow card) 68'	Report	Bebé (yellow card) 35'	Stadium: Vicente Calderón; Attendance: 45,523; Referee: José María Sánchez Martínez

8 May 2016 37	Levante	2–1	Atlético Madrid	Valencia
17:00 CEST (UTC+02:00)	Víctor 30'; Juanfran (yellow card) 42'; Rossi 90'	Report	F. Torres 2'; Giménez (yellow card) 65'	Stadium: Ciutat de València; Attendance: 11,806; Referee: José González González

14 May 2016 38	Atlético Madrid	2–0	Celta Vigo	Madrid
19:30 CEST (UTC+02:00)	Gabi (yellow card) 36'; Griezmann (yellow card) 47', (goal) 54'; F. Torres 51'; Savić (yellow card) 79'; Koke (yellow card) 81'	Report	Orellana (yellow card) 67'; Nolito (yellow card) 81'; Mallo (yellow card) 82'; Hernández (yellow card) 83'; Aspas (yellow card) 84'	Stadium: Vicente Calderón; Attendance: 37,880; Referee: David Fernández Borbalán

=== Copa del Rey ===
==== Round of 32 ====
1 December 2015 First leg	Reus Deportiu	1–2	Atlético Madrid	Reus
20:00 CET (UTC+01:00)	Carbià 30'	Report	Vietto 36'; Saúl 63'	Stadium: Camp Nou Municipal; Attendance: 4,222; Referee: David Fernandez Borbalan

17 December 2015 Second leg	Atlético Madrid	1–0 (3–1 agg.)	Reus	Madrid
20:00 CET (UTC+01:00)	Partey 53', (yellow card) 55'	Report	Vítor (yellow card) 21'	Stadium: Vicente Calderón; Attendance: 23,114; Referee: Alberto Undiano Mallenco

==== Round of 16 ====
6 January 2016 First leg	Rayo Vallecano	1–1	Atlético Madrid	Madrid
22:05 CET (UTC+01:00)	Miku (yellow card) 23'; Nacho 35'; Dorado (yellow card) 79'	Report	Siqueira (yellow card) 19'; F. Torres (yellow card) 29'; Saúl 67', (yellow card) 72'; Partey (yellow card) 90+1'	Stadium: Campo de Vallecas; Attendance: 5,223; Referee: Santiago Jaime Latre

14 January 2016 Second leg	Atlético Madrid	3–0 (4–1 agg.)	Rayo Vallecano	Madrid
20:30 CET (UTC+01:00)	Correa 40'; Filipe Luís (yellow card) 61'; Griezmann 80', 90+1'	Report	Castro (yellow card) 36'	Stadium: Vicente Calderón; Attendance: 23,522; Referee: José Luis González González

==== Quarter-finals ====
20 January 2016 First leg	Celta Vigo	0–0	Atlético Madrid	Vigo
20:30 CET (UTC+01:00)	Orellana (yellow card) 90+3'	Report	Martínez (yellow card) 20'	Stadium: Balaídos; Attendance: 17,428; Referee: Javier Estrada Fernández

27 January 2016 Second leg	Atlético Madrid	2–3 (2–3 agg.)	Celta Vigo	Madrid
20:30 CET (UTC+01:00)	Vietto (yellow card) 16'; Griezmann 29'; Filipe Luís (yellow card) 68'; Gabi (yellow card) 78'; Koke (yellow card) 79'; Correa 81'	Report	Hernández 22', 64'; Guidetti (yellow card) 35', (goal) 56'; Mallo (yellow card) 69'	Stadium: Vicente Calderón; Attendance: 36,852; Referee: Antonio Mateu Lahoz

=== UEFA Champions League ===
==== Group stage ====
Pos	Team	Pld	W	D	L	GF	GA	GD	Pts	Qualification	ATM	BEN	GAL	AST
1	(Spain) Atlético Madrid	6	4	1	1	11	3	+8	13	Advance to knockout phase	—	1–2	2–0	4–0
2	(Portugal) Benfica	6	3	1	2	10	8	+2	10	Advance to knockout phase	1–2	—	2–1	2–0
3	(Turkey) Galatasaray	6	1	2	3	6	10	−4	5	Transfer to Europa League	0–2	2–1	—	1–1
4	(Kazakhstan) Astana	6	0	4	2	5	11	−6	4		0–0	2–2	2–2	—

Source: UEFA
Rules for classification: Group stage tiebreakers

15 September 2015 1	Galatasaray (Turkey)	0–2	(Spain) Atlético Madrid	Istanbul, Turkey
20:45 CEST (UTC+02:00)	Yılmaz (yellow card) 64'; Öztekin (yellow card) 73'	Report	Griezmann 18', 25'; Gabi (yellow card) 64'	Stadium: Türk Telekom Arena; Attendance: 33,469; Referee: Szymon Marciniak (Poland); Man of the Match: Antoine Griezmann

30 September 2015 2	Atlético Madrid (Spain)	1–2	(Portugal) Benfica	Madrid, Spain
20:45 CEST (UTC+02:00)	Correa 23'; Martínez (yellow card) 39'; Ó. Torres (yellow card) 55'	Report	Eliseu (yellow card) 25'; Luisão (yellow card) 28'; Gaitán 36'; Samaris (yellow card) 39'; Guedes 51'; Jardel (yellow card) 82'	Stadium: Vicente Calderón; Attendance: 40,938; Referee: Gianluca Rocchi (Italy); Man of the Match: Nicolás Gaitán

21 October 2015 3	Atlético Madrid (Spain)	4–0	(Kazakhstan) Astana	Madrid, Spain
20:45 CEST (UTC+02:00)	Saúl 23'; Martínez 29'; Ó. Torres 63'; Dedechko 89' (o.g.)	Report	Akhmetov (yellow card) 49'	Stadium: Vicente Calderón; Attendance: 33,853; Referee: Aleksei Kulbakov (Belarus); Man of the Match: Yannick Carrasco

3 November 2015 4	Astana (Kazakhstan)	0–0	(Spain) Atlético Madrid	Astana, Kazakhstan
16:00 East (UTC+06:00)	Postnikov (yellow card) 44'; Dzholchiyev (yellow card) 60'; Zhukov (yellow card) 84'	Report		Stadium: Astana Arena; Attendance: 29,231; Referee: Anthony Taylor (England); Man of the Match: Diego Godín

25 November 2015 5	Atlético Madrid (Spain)	2–0	(Turkey) Galatasaray	Madrid, Spain
20:45 CET (UTC+01:00)	Griezmann 13', 65'	Report	Adın (yellow card) 65'	Stadium: Vicente Calderón; Attendance: 35,753; Referee: Nicola Rizzoli (Italy); Man of the Match: Gabi

8 December 2015 6	Benfica (Portugal)	1–2	(Spain) Atlético Madrid	Lisbon, Portugal
20:45 CET (UTC+01:00)	Mitroglou 75'; Fejsa (yellow card) 77'	Report	Saúl 33', (yellow card) 70'; Vietto 55'; Godín (yellow card) 68'; Ó. Torres (yellow card) 89'	Stadium: Estádio da Luz; Attendance: 47,630; Referee: Ovidiu Hațegan (Romania); Man of the Match: Luciano Vietto

==== Knockout phase ====
===== Round of 16 =====
24 February 2016 First leg	PSV Eindhoven (Netherlands)	0–0	(Spain) Atlético Madrid	Eindhoven, Netherlands
20:45 CET (UTC+01:00)	Pereiro (yellow card) 54' (red card) 68'	Report	Savić (yellow card) 22'	Stadium: Philips Stadion; Attendance: 34,948; Referee: Daniele Orsato (Italy); Man of the Match: Gabi

15 March 2016 Second leg	Atlético Madrid (Spain)	0–0 (a.e.t.) (0–0 agg.) (8–7 p)	(Netherlands) PSV Eindhoven	Madrid, Spain
20:45 CET (UTC+01:00)		Report	Locadia (yellow card) 30'; De Jong (yellow card) 66'; Guardado (yellow card) 120'; Van Ginkel (yellow card) 120+1'	Stadium: Vicente Calderón; Attendance: 50,135; Referee: Mark Clattenburg (England); Man of the Match: Jeffrey Bruma
	Penalties
	Griezmann (penalty scored); Gabi (penalty scored); Koke (penalty scored); Saúl (penalty scored); F. Torres (penalty scored); Giménez (penalty scored); Filipe Luís (penalty scored); Juanfran (penalty scored)		(penalty scored) Van Ginkel; (penalty scored) Guardado; (penalty scored) Pröpper; (penalty scored) Bruma; (penalty scored) Moreno; (penalty scored) Lestienne; (penalty scored) Arias; (penalty missed) Narsingh

===== Quarter-finals =====
5 April 2016 First leg	Barcelona (Spain)	2–1	(Spain) Atlético Madrid	Barcelona, Spain
20:45 CEST (UTC+02:00)	Busquets (yellow card) 48'; Suárez 63', 74', (yellow card) 70'; Mascherano (yellow card) 82'	Report	F. Torres 25', (yellow card) 29' (yellow-red card) 35'; Koke (yellow card) 33'; Filipe Luís (yellow card) 61'; Griezmann (yellow card) 73'; Hernandez (yellow card) 78'; Oblak (yellow card) 79'; Fernández (yellow card) 86'	Stadium: Camp Nou; Attendance: 88,534; Referee: Felix Brych (Germany); Man of the Match: Dani Alves

13 April 2016 Second leg	Atlético Madrid (Spain)	2–0 (3–2 agg.)	(Spain) Barcelona	Madrid, Spain
20:45 CEST (UTC+02:00)	Griezmann 36', 88' (pen.); Gabi (yellow card) 69'; Godín (yellow card) 85'; Correa (yellow card) 90'; Koke (yellow card) 90+5'	Report	Suárez (yellow card) 70'; Neymar (yellow card) 76'; Iniesta (yellow card) 87'; Turan (yellow card) 90+1'	Stadium: Vicente Calderón; Attendance: 52,851; Referee: Nicola Rizzoli (Italy); Man of the Match: Antoine Griezmann

===== Semi-finals =====
27 April 2016 First leg	Atlético Madrid (Spain)	1–0	(Germany) Bayern Munich	Madrid, Spain
20:45 CEST (UTC+02:00)	Saúl 11', (yellow card) 84'	Report	Douglas Costa (yellow card) 40'; Benatia (yellow card) 82'; Neuer (yellow card) 82'; Vidal (yellow card) 88'	Stadium: Vicente Calderón; Attendance: 52,127; Referee: Mark Clattenburg (England); Man of the Match: Saúl

3 May 2016 Second leg	Bayern Munich (Germany)	2–1 (2–2 (a) agg.)	(Spain) Atlético Madrid	Munich, Germany
20:45 CEST (UTC+02:00)	Alonso 31'; Müller (penalty missed) 34'; Lewandowski 74'; Martínez (yellow card) 84'	Report	Giménez (yellow card) 34'; Griezmann 54'; F. Torres (penalty missed) 86'	Stadium: Allianz Arena; Attendance: 70,000; Referee: Cüneyt Çakır (Turkey); Man of the Match: Jan Oblak

===== Final =====
28 May 2016 Final	Real Madrid (Spain)	1–1 (a.e.t.) (5–3 p)	(Spain) Atlético Madrid	Milan, Italy
20:45 CEST (UTC+02:00)	Carvajal (yellow card) 11'; Ramos 15', (yellow card) 90+3'; Navas (yellow card) 47'; Casemiro (yellow card) 79'; Danilo (yellow card) 90+3'; Pepe (yellow card) 112'	Report	Griezmann (penalty missed) 48'; F. Torres (yellow card) 61'; Carrasco 79'; Gabi (yellow card) 90+3'	Stadium: San Siro; Attendance: 71,942; Referee: Mark Clattenburg (England); Man of the Match: Sergio Ramos
	Penalties
	Vázquez (penalty scored); Marcelo (penalty scored); Bale (penalty scored); Ramos (penalty scored); Ronaldo (penalty scored)		(penalty scored) Griezmann; (penalty scored) Gabi; (penalty scored) Saúl; (penalty missed) Juanfran

== Statistics ==
=== Squad statistics ===
Match played 28 May 2016.

No.	Pos.	Player	Total				La Liga				Cup				Champions League			
No.	Pos.	Player		Goal	Yellow card	Red card		Goal	Yellow card	Red card		Goal	Yellow card	Red card		Goal	Yellow card	Red card
1	GK	(Spain) Miguel Ángel Moyà	6	0	0	0	0	0	0	0	6	0	0	0	0	0	0	0
2	DF	(Uruguay) Diego Godín	46	1	7	1	31	1	5	1	3	0	0	0	12	0	2	0
3	DF	(Brazil) Filipe Luís	45	1	14	1	32	1	11	1	3	0	2	0	10	0	1	0
5	MF	(Portugal) Tiago	19	1	4	0	14	1	4	0	0	0	0	0	5	0	0	0
6	MF	(Spain) Koke	51	5	7	0	35	5	4	0	5	0	1	0	11	0	2	0
7	FW	(France) Antoine Griezmann	54	32	6	0	38	22	5	0	3	3	0	0	13	7	1	0
8	MF	(Argentina) Matías Kranevitter	11	0	1	0	8	0	1	0	2	0	0	0	1	0	0	0
9	FW	(Spain) Fernando Torres	44	12	5	1	30	11	3	0	2	0	1	0	12	1	1	1
10	MF	(Spain) Óliver Torres	33	1	4	0	21	0	2	0	5	0	0	0	7	1	2	0
12	MF	(Argentina) Augusto Fernández	21	0	5	0	13	0	4	0	2	0	0	0	6	0	1	0
13	GK	(Slovenia) Jan Oblak	51	0	1	0	38	0	0	0	0	0	0	0	13	0	1	0
14	MF	(Spain) Gabi	52	1	15	1	35	1	11	1	4	0	1	0	13	0	3	0
15	DF	(Montenegro) Stefan Savić	24	0	2	0	12	0	1	0	5	0	0	0	7	0	1	0
16	FW	(Argentina) Ángel Correa	36	8	8	0	26	5	7	0	5	2	0	0	5	1	1	0
17	MF	(Spain) Saúl	48	9	4	0	31	4	1	0	4	2	1	0	13	3	2	0
18	DF	(Spain) Jesús Gámez	16	0	3	0	10	0	3	0	5	0	0	0	1	0	0	0
19	DF	(France) Lucas Hernandez	16	0	0	0	10	0	0	0	2	0	0	0	4	0	0	0
20	DF	(Spain) Juanfran	48	1	6	0	35	1	6	0	1	0	0	0	12	0	0	0
21	MF	(Belgium) Yannick Carrasco	43	5	5	0	29	4	5	0	5	0	0	0	9	1	0	0
22	MF	(Ghana) Thomas Partey	23	3	5	0	13	2	3	0	5	1	2	0	5	0	0	0
23	FW	(Argentina) Luciano Vietto	27	3	4	0	18	1	3	0	4	1	1	0	5	1	0	0
24	DF	(Uruguay) José Giménez	37	1	9	0	27	1	8	0	2	0	0	0	8	0	1	0
32	DF	(Spain) Nacho Monsalve^{1}	1	0	0	0	1	0	0	0	0	0	0	0	0	0	0	0
Players who left the club in Summer/Winter transfer window or on loan
–	MF	(Spain) Raúl García	1	0	0	0	1	0	0	0	0	0	0	0	0	0	0	0
–	DF	(Brazil) Guilherme Siqueira	7	0	2	0	1	0	1	0	3	0	1	0	3	0	0	0
–	FW	(Colombia) Jackson Martínez	22	3	2	0	15	2	0	0	3	0	1	0	4	1	1	0
Own goals			–	1	–	–	–	0	–	–	–	0	–	–	–	1	–	–
TOTALS			–	89	119	4	–	63	88	3	–	9	11	0	–	17	20	1

^{1} Player from reserve team.

=== Goalscorers ===
Rank	No.	Pos.	Player	La Liga	Cup	Champions League	Total
1	7	FW	(France) Antoine Griezmann	22	3	7	32
2	9	FW	(Spain) Fernando Torres	11	0	1	12
3	17	MF	(Spain) Saúl	4	2	3	9
4	16	FW	(Argentina) Ángel Correa	5	2	1	8
5	6	MF	(Spain) Koke	5	0	0	5
5	21	MF	(Belgium) Yannick Carrasco	4	0	1	5
7	22	MF	(Ghana) Thomas Partey	2	1	0	3
7	23	FW	(Argentina) Luciano Vietto	1	1	1	3
7	—	FW	(Colombia) Jackson Martínez	2	0	1	3
10	2	DF	(Uruguay) Diego Godín	1	0	0	1
10	3	DF	(Brazil) Filipe Luís	1	0	0	1
10	5	MF	(Portugal) Tiago	1	0	0	1
10	10	MF	(Spain) Óliver Torres	0	0	1	1
10	14	MF	(Spain) Gabi	1	0	0	1
10	20	MF	(Spain) Juanfran	1	0	0	1
10	24	DF	(Uruguay) José Giménez	1	0	0	1
Own goals				1	0	1	2
Totals				63	9	17	89

=== Assists ===
Rank	No.	Pos.	Player	La Liga	Cup	Champions League	Total
1	6	MF	(Spain) Koke	14	1	1	16
2	14	MF	(Spain) Gabi	3	3	3	9
3	7	FW	(France) Antoine Griezmann	5	0	1	6
4	23	FW	(Argentina) Luciano Vietto	3	1	1	5
4	9	FW	(Spain) Fernando Torres	4	0	1	5
6	21	MF	(Belgium) Yannick Carrasco	1	1	2	4
6	16	FW	(Argentina) Ángel Correa	4	0	0	4
6	17	MF	(Spain) Saúl	2	0	2	4
6	3	DF	(Brazil) Filipe Luís	4	0	0	4
10	10	MF	(Spain) Óliver Torres	2	1	0	3
10	2	DF	(Uruguay) Diego Godín	1	1	1	3
10	—	FW	(Colombia) Jackson Martínez	3	0	0	3
10	20	DF	(Spain) Juanfran	1	0	2	3
14	5	MF	(Portugal) Tiago	2	0	0	2
15	22	MF	(Ghana) Thomas Partey	1	0	0	1
15	24	DF	(Uruguay) José Giménez	1	0	0	1
15	12	DF	(Argentina) Augusto Fernández	0	0	1	1
Totals				51	8	15	74

=== Clean sheets ===
Match played 28 May 2016.

Rank	No.	Pos.	Player	Matches played	Clean sheet %	La Liga (%)	Cup (%)	Champions League (%)	Total
1	13	GK	(Slovenia) Jan Oblak	51	62,75%	24 (63,16%)	0 (0%)	7 (66,67%)	32
2	1	GK	(Spain) Miguel Ángel Moyà	6	50,00%	0 (0%)	3 (50,00%)	0 (0%)	3
Totals				57	61,40%	24	3	8	35

=== Attendances ===
	Matches	Attendances	Average	High	Low
La Liga	19	820,812	43,201	51,933	29,737
Copa del Rey	3	83,488	27,829	26,852	23,114
Champions League	6	265,657	44,276	52,851	33,853
Totals	28	1,169,957	41,784	52,851	23,114

== Awards ==
=== La Liga Manager of the Month ===
- Diego Simeone named Liga BBVA Manager of the Month for November.

=== La Liga Player of the Month ===
- Koke named Liga BBVA Player of the Month for April.

=== Zamora Trophy ===
- Jan Oblak won the Zamora Trophy for 2015–16 season for best goalkeeper.

=== La Liga Awards ===
- Jan Oblak for the best goalkeeper in 2015–16 season.
- Diego Godín for the best defender in 2015–16 season.
- Antoine Griezmann for the best player and Fans' Five-Star Player in 2015–16 season.
- Diego Simeone for the best coach in 2015–16 season.
