= José María Giménez =

Uruguayan footballer (born 1995)

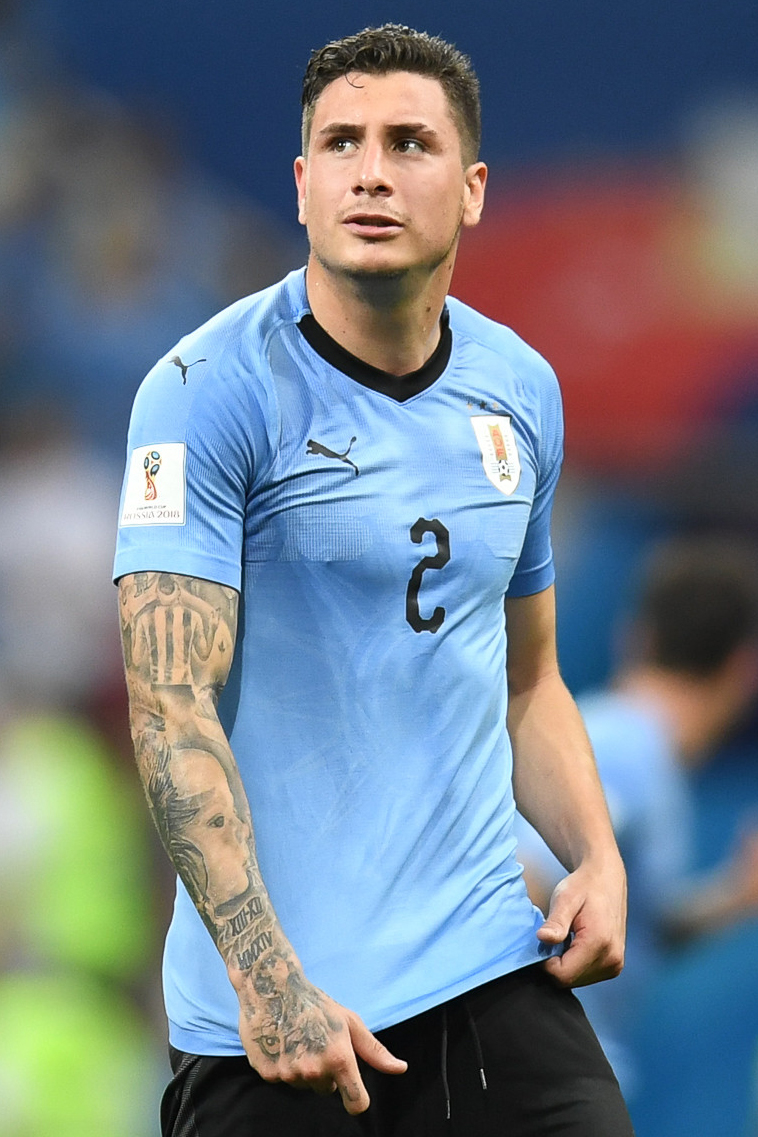
- Giménez with Uruguay at the 2018 FIFA World Cup

Personal information
- Full name: José María Giménez de Vargas
- Date of birth: 20 January 1995 (age 31)
- Place of birth: Toledo, Uruguay
- Height: 1.85 m (6 ft 1 in)
- Position: Centre-back

Team information
- Current team: Deportivo A Coruña (on loan from Atlético Madrid)
- Number: 20

Youth career
- Danubio

Senior career*
| Years | Team | Apps | (Gls) |
| 2012–2013 | Danubio | 16 | (0) |
| 2013– | Atlético Madrid | 270 | (6) |
| 2026– | → Deportivo A Coruña (loan) | 10 | (0) |

International career^{‡}
| 2013 | Uruguay U20 | 13 | (0) |
| 2013– | Uruguay | 102 | (8) |
Medal record
Representing Uruguay
Men's Football
Copa América
| Third place | 2024 United States |
FIFA U-20 World Cup
| Runner-up | 2013 Turkey |
- * Club domestic league appearances and goals as of 21 November 2026 ‡ National team caps and goals as of 18 November 2026

José María Giménez de Vargas (Spanish pronunciation: [xoˈse maˈɾi.a xiˈmenes ðe ˈβaɾɣas]; (Note: In isolation, Vargas is pronounced [ˈbaɾɣas].) born 20 January 1995) is a Uruguayan professional footballer who plays as a centre-back for La Liga club Deportivo A Coruña, on loan from Atlético Madrid, and captains the Uruguay national team.

After starting out his professional career with Danubio FC, Giménez signed for Atlético Madrid, where he would spend over a decade and play more than 350 games. He won five major titles with the latter, including the La Liga title in 2013–14 and 2020–21, as well as the UEFA Europa League in 2017–18.

At international level, Giménez made his Uruguay debut in 2013, and has earned over 100 caps. He has represented the nation at four FIFA World Cups and five editions of the Copa América, helping the team to third place at the 2024 Copa América.

== Early life ==
Giménez was born in Toledo. He left secondary school halfway through the six years, because the second half had lessons in the afternoon that clashed with his training with Danubio FC. When his sister became pregnant, he told his agent he would leave football for full-time work, but he was able to get a contract with Danubio.

== Club career ==
=== Danubio ===
Giménez made his professional debut for Danubio in the Uruguayan Primera División on 17 November 2012 (when the manager was Juan Ramón Carrasco) against River Plate in which he started and played the full 90 minutes as Danubio lost the match 2–0.

=== Atlético Madrid ===
==== 2013–2016 ====
On 24 April 2013, it was confirmed that Giménez had signed a five-year deal with Spanish side Atlético Madrid, and would join the club in the pre-season of the 2013–14 season. On 14 September, Giménez made his Atleti – and La Liga – debut, starting in a 4–2 home win over UD Almería. It was his only appearance of a league-winning season. Giménez's appearances were initially limited by competition from compatriot Diego Godín, as well as Miranda and Toby Alderweireld.

In August 2014, Giménez won the Supercopa de España against rivals Real Madrid, though he did not leave the substitutes' bench in either game. He scored his first goal for the club on 6 December 2014, opening a 2–0 win away to Elche CF to move Atlético into second place. He played more often in 2014–15 due to Alderweireld's departure, and the club then sold Miranda to Inter Milan, with Giménez having achieved higher averages per game of tackles and interceptions than the Brazilian veteran. Giménez was a regular starter the following season, until losing his place to Stefan Savić for the last third of the campaign.

==== 2016–2019 ====
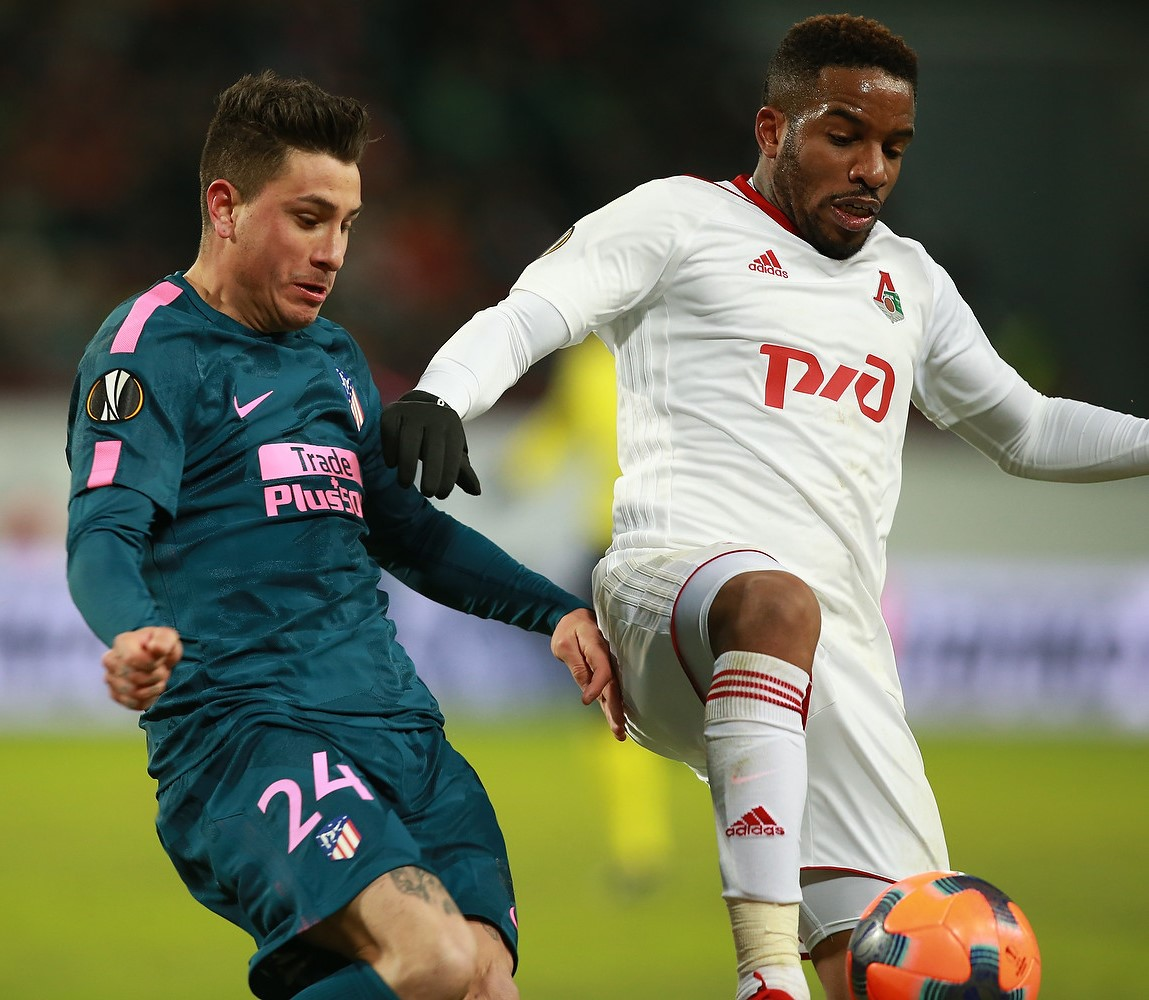
Giménez (left) with Atlético in 2018

In July 2016, Giménez was naturalised as a citizen of Spain, thereby freeing up one of Atlético's three spots for players from outside the European Union. He struggled for appearances in 2016–17, due to injuries and the form of Godín, Savić and Lucas Hernandez. On 27 September 2017, he made his 100th appearance in a Champions League group 2–1 home loss to Chelsea, and was honoured with a plaque on the "Walk of Legends" at Atlético's new Metropolitano Stadium. His team won the UEFA Europa League, with him partnering Godín in central defence for the 3–0 win over Olympique de Marseille in the final on 16 May.

In June 2018, with 134 games to his name, Giménez signed a new five-year contract. Atlético won the 2018 UEFA Super Cup on 15 August, with Giménez playing as a substitute for Diego Costa in the last 10 minutes of extra time in a 4–2 win over Real Madrid in Tallinn. On 20 February 2019, he scored the opener in 2-0 home win against Italian champions Juventus to give Atlético the advantage in the first leg of the Round of 16 fixture in the UEFA Champions League.

==== 2019–2026 ====
Ahead of the 2019–20 season, after Godín's departure, manager Diego Simeone named Koke as Atlético captain, followed by goalkeeper Jan Oblak, then Giménez as third-captain. Atlético won the league in 2020–21, with Simeone, Giménez and Koke the only veterans of their previous triumph in 2014; Savić and Mario Hermoso were the preferred central defensive pairing.

In August 2021, on 216 appearances across all competitions, Giménez's contract was extended to 2025. On 6 August 2023, this was extended to 2028. He made his 300th appearance for the club on 16 December that year, coming on as a substitute for Çağlar Söyüncü in a 2–0 loss at Athletic Bilbao; he became the 31st player to reach the mark.

==== Loan to Deportivo A Coruña ====
On 1 September 2026, Giménez was loaned to Deportivo A Coruña also in the top tier, for one year. He made his debut four days later in a 3–2 win away to Villarreal.

== International career ==
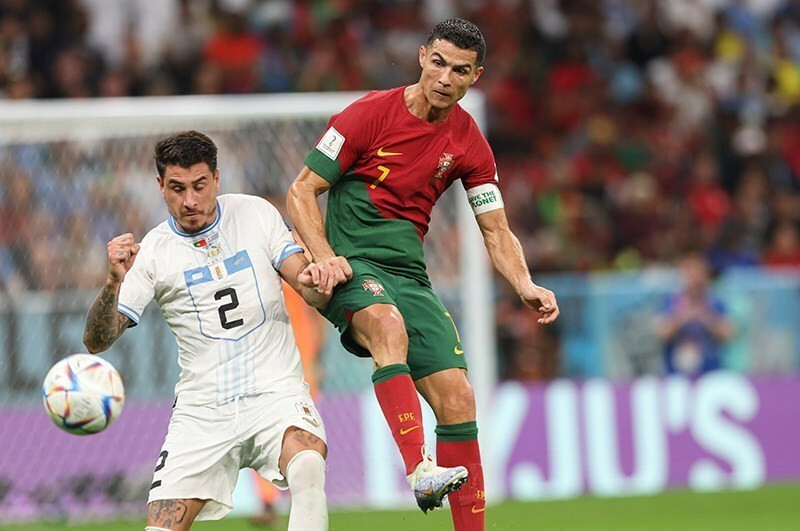
Giménez (left) and Cristiano Ronaldo at the 2022 FIFA World Cup

Giménez participated for Uruguay at the 2013 FIFA U-20 World Cup as the team finished as runner-up to France.

He debuted for the Uruguay senior team in a 2014 FIFA World Cup qualifier against Colombia on 10 September 2013.

On 2 June 2014, Giménez was named in Uruguay's squad for the 2014 FIFA World Cup finals. The 19-year-old defender made his tournament debut against England in the team's second group match, deputising for the injured captain Diego Lugano in a 2–1 victory for La Celeste. He went on to start in the final group match – a 1–0 win over Italy – and the 2–0 round of 16 loss to Colombia.

Giménez scored his first international goal in a 1–0 friendly win against South Korea on 8 September 2014. In May 2015, he was named in Uruguay's squad for the 2015 Copa América by coach Óscar Tabárez. On 20 June, he scored Uruguay's goal in a 1–1 draw with Paraguay which saw both teams progress to the knockout stage.

In May 2018 he was named in Uruguay's provisional 26-man squad for the 2018 FIFA World Cup in Russia. On 15 June, with the score tied at 0–0, he scored the winning goal in the final minute of Uruguay's opening game of the World Cup against Egypt.

In March 2019, Tabárez included Giménez in the final 23-man Uruguay squad for the 2019 Copa América in Brazil. He headed the equaliser in the 2–2 group draw with Japan in Porto Alegre, and was the only Uruguayan in the Team of the Tournament despite a quarter-final exit. He was also chosen for the 2021 Copa América.

At the 2022 FIFA World Cup in Qatar, Uruguay were eliminated from the group stage on goals scored. Giménez and goalkeeper Fernando Muslera were given four-match suspensions for confronting the referee when he did not award a penalty against Ghana.

Uruguay came third at the 2024 Copa América in the United States. In the third-place match against Canada, he assisted the added-time equaliser by Luis Suárez for a 2–2 draw that his team won on penalties. Later in the year, Suárez retired from international football, and Giménez became the new captain.

On 31 May 2026, Giménez was named in Uruguay's 26-man squad for the 2026 FIFA World Cup. However, he did not feature in any matches at the tournament, having suffered an ankle injury. Later that year, on 24 September, he made his 100th international appearance in a 3–1 defeat against Japan during the Kirin Challenge Cup.

== Personal life ==
Giménez married Regina Iafolla in a civil ceremony in June 2019, prior the Copa América. They have three sons. In 2026, he revealed that both he and his son had ADHD, and that he was completing his secondary education remotely from Spain through the Uruguayan footballers' union.

== Career statistics ==
=== Club ===
As of match played 21 November 2026

Appearances and goals by club, season and competition
| Club | Season | League | | | National cup (Note: Includes Copa del Rey) | | Continental | | Other | | Total | |
| Club | Season | Division | Apps | Goals | Apps | Goals | Apps | Goals | Apps | Goals | Apps | Goals |
|---|---|---|---|---|---|---|---|---|---|---|---|---|
| Danubio | 2012–13 | Uruguayan Primera División | 16 | 0 | 0 | 0 | — | | — | | 16 | 0 |
| Atlético Madrid | 2013–14 | La Liga | 1 | 0 | 1 | 0 | 0 | 0 | — | | 2 | 0 |
| Atlético Madrid | 2014–15 | La Liga | 20 | 1 | 4 | 1 | 4 (Note: Appearances in UEFA Champions League) | 0 | — | | 28 | 2 |
| Atlético Madrid | 2015–16 | La Liga | 27 | 1 | 2 | 0 | 8 | 0 | — | | 37 | 1 |
| Atlético Madrid | 2016–17 | La Liga | 17 | 0 | 6 | 1 | 6 | 0 | — | | 29 | 1 |
| Atlético Madrid | 2017–18 | La Liga | 23 | 1 | 4 | 1 | 11 (Note: Four appearances in UEFA Champions League, seven appearances in UEFA Europa League) | 0 | — | | 38 | 2 |
| Atlético Madrid | 2018–19 | La Liga | 21 | 0 | 2 | 0 | 5 | 2 | 1 (Note: Appearance in UEFA Super Cup) | 0 | 29 | 2 |
| Atlético Madrid | 2019–20 | La Liga | 21 | 0 | 0 | 0 | 5 | 0 | 1 (Note: Appearance(s) in Supercopa de España) | 0 | 27 | 0 |
| Atlético Madrid | 2020–21 | La Liga | 21 | 0 | 1 | 0 | 4 | 1 | — | | 26 | 1 |
| Atlético Madrid | 2021–22 | La Liga | 24 | 1 | 1 | 0 | 7 | 0 | 1 | 0 | 33 | 1 |
| Atlético Madrid | 2022–23 | La Liga | 28 | 2 | 3 | 0 | 5 | 0 | — | | 36 | 2 |
| Atlético Madrid | 2023–24 | La Liga | 22 | 0 | 3 | 0 | 7 | 0 | 1 | 0 | 33 | 0 |
| Atlético Madrid | 2024–25 | La Liga | 27 | 0 | 3 | 0 | 8 | 1 | 1 (Note: Appearance in FIFA Club World Cup) | 0 | 39 | 1 |
| Atlético Madrid | 2025–26 | La Liga | 16 | 0 | 3 | 0 | 6 | 1 | 0 | 0 | 25 | 1 |
| Atlético Madrid | 2026–27 | La Liga | 2 | 0 | — | | — | | — | | 2 | 0 |
| Atlético Madrid | Total | | 270 | 6 | 33 | 3 | 76 | 5 | 5 | 0 | 384 | 14 |
| Deportivo A Coruña (loan) | 2026–27 | La Liga | 10 | 0 | 0 | 0 | — | | — | | 10 | 0 |
| Career total | | | 296 | 6 | 33 | 3 | 76 | 5 | 5 | 0 | 410 | 14 |

=== International ===
As of match played 17 November 2026

Appearances and goals by national team and year
| National team | Year | Apps | Goals |
|---|---|---|---|
| Uruguay | 2013 | 3 | 0 |
| Uruguay | 2014 | 12 | 2 |
| Uruguay | 2015 | 10 | 1 |
| Uruguay | 2016 | 5 | 0 |
| Uruguay | 2017 | 9 | 1 |
| Uruguay | 2018 | 8 | 3 |
| Uruguay | 2019 | 11 | 1 |
| Uruguay | 2020 | 2 | 0 |
| Uruguay | 2021 | 13 | 0 |
| Uruguay | 2022 | 8 | 0 |
| Uruguay | 2023 | 2 | 0 |
| Uruguay | 2024 | 9 | 0 |
| Uruguay | 2025 | 5 | 0 |
| Uruguay | 2026 | 5 | 0 |
| Total | | 102 | 8 |

Scores and results list Uruguay's goal tally first.

List of international goals scored by José Giménez
| No. | Date | Venue | Opponent | Score | Result | Competition |
|---|---|---|---|---|---|---|
| 1. | 8 September 2014 | Goyang Stadium, Goyang, South Korea | South Korea | 1–0 | 1–0 | Friendly |
| 2. | 13 November 2014 | Estadio Centenario, Montevideo, Uruguay | Costa Rica | 2–2 | 3–3 | Friendly |
| 3. | 20 June 2015 | Estadio La Portada, La Serena, Chile | Paraguay | 1–0 | 1–1 | 2015 Copa América |
| 4. | 4 June 2017 | Aviva Stadium, Dublin, Republic of Ireland | Republic of Ireland | 1–1 | 1–3 | Friendly |
| 5. | 7 June 2018 | Estadio Centenario, Montevideo, Uruguay | Uzbekistan | 3–0 | 3–0 | Friendly |
| 6. | 15 June 2018 | Central Stadium, Yekaterinburg, Russia | Egypt | 1–0 | 1–0 | 2018 FIFA World Cup |
| 7. | 7 September 2018 | NRG Stadium, Houston, United States | Mexico | 1–0 | 4–1 | Friendly |
| 8. | 20 June 2019 | Arena do Grêmio, Porto Alegre, Brazil | Japan | 2–2 | 2–2 | 2019 Copa América |

== Honours ==
Atlético Madrid

- La Liga: 2013–14, 2020–21
- Supercopa de España: 2014
- UEFA Europa League: 2017–18
- UEFA Super Cup: 2018
- UEFA Champions League runner-up: 2013–14, 2015–16

Uruguay U20

- FIFA U-20 World Cup runner-up: 2013

Uruguay

- Copa América third place: 2024

Individual

- Copa América Team of the Tournament: 2019

== See also ==
- List of men's footballers with 100 or more international caps
