= Uche Agbo =

Nigerian footballer (born 1975)

Personal information
- Date of birth: 4 April 1975 (age 51)
- Place of birth: Aba, Nigeria
- Height: 1.74 m (5 ft 9 in)
- Position: Midfielder

Senior career*
Years	Team	Apps	(Gls)
1995	Obilić	12	(1)
1996	Rad	10	(0)
1997–1998	Montpellier	4	(1)
1997–1998	Montpellier B	5	(0)
1998–1999	Adanaspor	10	(0)
- * Club domestic league appearances and goals

Uche Agbo (born 4 April 1975) is a retired Nigerian professional football midfielder. He played for several clubs in Europe.

== Career ==
Agbo played in FR Yugoslavia for two Belgrade clubs FK Obilić and FK Rad before moving to clubs in France and Turkey. He scored one goal for Obilić in the First League of FR Yugoslavia, on 26 November 1995, in a away defeat against FK Sloboda Užice by 1–2. He played for Montpellier HSC in the French Ligue 1 during the 1997–98 season and Adanaspor in the Turkish Süper Lig during the 1998–99 season.
