= Jesús Gil y Gil Memorial =

Jesús Gil Trophy is a trophy

The Jesús Gil y Gil Memorial is a football tournament created in 2005 as a tribute to Jesús Gil, president of Atlético Madrid. It ran in 2005 and 2006, was not held for several years, and has taken place annually since 2013.

== Jesús Gil Trophy 2005 ==
On 31 December 2005 the Jesús Gil Trophy I started.

The 4–3–3/4–2–3–1 Lineup. Real Madrid's Lineup for the Jesús Gil 2006 game.

The 4–3–3/4–2–3–1 Lineup. Atlético Madrid's Lineup for the Jesús Gil 2006 game.

ATLÉTICO MADRID: Falcon; Velasco, Pablo, Perea, Molinero; Zainos, Colsa, Gabi, Ibagaza; Petrov, Torres.

REAL MADRID: López; Diogo, Pavón, Mejia, Roberto Carlos; Gravesen, Guti, Balboa, Robinho; Baptista, Soldado.

- Atlético Madrid 1-1 Real Madrid
- Goals: 0-1 (min. 28) Soldado; 1-1 (min. 74) Ibagaza.
- Win Real Madrid; Penalties 5-6.

== Jesús Gil Trophy 2006 ==
On 22 December 2006 the Jesús Gil Trophy II started.

ATLÉTICO MADRID: Cuéllar; Molinero, Pablo, Azcárate, Antonio López; Galletti, Jurado, Gabi, Mista; Torres, Agüero.

REAL MADRID: Lopez; Cannavaro, Pavón, Bravo, Salgado; De la Red, Raúl, Guti, Nieto; Negredo, Reyes.

- Atlético Madrid 0-0 Real Madrid
- Win Atlético Madrid; Penalties 4-3.

== Jesús Gil Trophy 2013 ==
On 21 July 2013 the Jesús Gil Trophy III started, returning after a 7-year absence. Numancia took the place of Real Madrid.

NUMANCIA: Biel Ribas; Isidoro, Juanma, Regalón, Bonilla; Gallardo, Julio Álvarez, David Martín, Bedoya; Nieto, Natalio.

ATLÉTICO MADRID: Courtois; Juanfran, Miranda, Demichelis, Filipe Luís; Mario Suárez, Gabi, Koke, Arda Turan; Adrián, Diego Costa.

- Win Atlético Madrid
- CD Numancia 2-4 Atlético Madrid
- Goals: 0-1 (min. 7) Costa; 0-2 (min. 16) Costa; 0-3 (min. 46) Aquino; 1-3 (min. 56) Palanca; 1-4 (min. 66) Baptistão; 2-4 (min. 69) Palanca.

== Jesús Gil Trophy 2014 ==
On 23 July 2014 the Jesús Gil Trophy IV started.

NUMANCIA: Biel Ribas; Gaffoor, Pedraza, Iñigo Perez, Palanca; Juanma, Isidoro, Vicente, Natalio, Bonilla; Sergi Enrich.

ATLÉTICO MADRID: Bono; Juanfran, Miranda, Godín, Siqueira; Mario Suárez, Gabi, Koke, Arda Turan; Raúl García, Mandžukić.

- CD Numancia 0-1 Atlético Madrid
- Goals: 0-1 (min. 44) Hector Hernández
- Win Atlético Madrid

== Titles by club ==
- (Spain) Atlético Madrid 3 titles.
- (Spain) Real Madrid 1 title.
