= Marcos Bustos =

Argentine footballer

Personal information
- Full name: Marcos Eduardo Bustos
- Date of birth: 14 May 1979 (age 47)
- Place of birth: Córdoba, Argentina
- Height: 1.77 m (5 ft 10 in)
- Position: Defender

Senior career*
Years	Team	Apps	(Gls)
1998–2004	Belgrano	51	(3)
2004–2005	Alumni Villa María	16	(0)
2005–2006	Juventud Pergamino	24	(3)
2006–2007	Racing de Córdoba	25	(1)
2007	Juventud Antoniana	12	(1)
2008 ,	Luján de Cuyo	15	(2)
2008–2009	Coquimbo Unido	22	(0)
2010	Defensores de Salto	14	(3)
2011–2012	Sarmiento de Leones	18	(1)
2012	Bell	–	(–)
- * Club domestic league appearances and goals

Marcos Eduardo Bustos (born 14 May 1979) is an Argentine former footballer who played as a defender. He played in his homeland and Chile.

== Club career ==
Born in Córdoba, Argentina, Bustos developed almost all his career in his homeland. He played for Belgrano, Alumni de Villa María, Juventud de Pergamino, Racing de Córdoba, Juventud Antoniana and Luján de Cuyo between 1998 and 2008.

In the second half of 2008, Bustos moved to Chile and joined Coquimbo Unido along with his countrymen Juan Carlos Cata Díaz and Jonathan Jacquet.

Back to Argentina, Bustos ended his career with Defensores de Salto, Sarmiento de Leones and Club Atlético y Biblioteca Bell.
