= 2012–13 Atlético Madrid season =

107th season in existence of Atlético Madrid

Atlético Madrid
2012–13 season
- President: Enrique Cerezo
- Head coach: Diego Simeone
- Stadium: Vicente Calderón
- La Liga: 3rd
- Copa del Rey: Winners
- UEFA Europa League: Round of 32
- UEFA Super Cup: Winners
- Top goalscorer: League: Radamel Falcao (28); All: Radamel Falcao (34)
Home colours	Away colours

The 2012–13 Atlético Madrid season was the 82nd season in the club's history. Atlético competed in La Liga, the Copa del Rey, and in the Europa League as defending champions. They were eliminated in the Round of 32 by Rubin Kazan. They won the Copa del Rey after beating rivals Real Madrid 2–1 in extra time.

On 1 September, Atlético beat English club Chelsea with a scoreline of 4–1 to win the UEFA Super Cup for the second time in three years.

== Kits ==
Supplier: Nike / Main Sponsor: Huawei, later Azerbaijan / Back Sponsor: Kyocera

Home	Home alt.	Away	Away alt.	Goalkeeper 1	Goalkeeper 2	Goalkeeper 3

== Pre-season and friendlies ==
1 August 2012 Gira Americana	Atlético Nacional	1–2	Atlético Madrid	Medellín, Colombia
18:35 UTC−05:00	Murillo (yellow card) 39'; Pajoy 55'	Report	Miranda (yellow card) 53'; Filipe Luís (yellow card) 58'; Sílvio (yellow card) 60'; Kader 66'; Falcao 85'	Stadium: Atanasio Girardot; Attendance: 7,831; Referee: Sebastián Restrepo (Colombia)

4 August 2012 Gira Americana	Deportivo Saprissa	0–0	Atlético Madrid	San José, Costa Rica
20:00 UTC−06:00	Tejeda (yellow card); Cordero (yellow card)	Report	Rodríguez (yellow card); Miranda (yellow card); Díaz (yellow card) (yellow-red card) 90'	Stadium: Ricardo Saprissa; Attendance: 15,000; Referee: Henry Bejarano (Costa Rica)

11 August 2012 LXVII Trofeo Teresa Herrera	Deportivo La Coruña	2–2 (4–3 p)	Atlético Madrid	A Coruña, Spain
21:00 CEST	Valerón 8'; Marchena (yellow card) 17'; Pizzi (yellow card) 51'; Gama 56'; Roderick (yellow card) 86'; Aythami (yellow card) 88'	Report	Koke 11'; Falcao 85'	Stadium: Riazor; Attendance: 18,000; Referee: Pérez Lasa (Basque Country.
	Penalties
	Pizzi (penalty scored); Oliveira (penalty missed); Santos (penalty scored); Gama (penalty scored); Aguilar (penalty scored)		(penalty scored) Falcao; (penalty scored) Rodríguez; (penalty scored) García; (penalty missed) Adrián; (penalty missed) Godín

== Competitions ==
=== UEFA Super Cup ===
31 August 2012 Final	Chelsea (England)	1–4	(Spain) Atlético Madrid	Monaco
20:45 CEST	Ivanović (yellow card) 28'; Cahill 75'	Report	Falcao 6', 19', 45'; Miranda 60'	Stadium: Stade Louis II; Attendance: 14,312; Referee: Damir Skomina (Slovenia)

=== La Liga ===
==== League table ====
Pos	Team	Pld	W	D	L	GF	GA	GD	Pts	Qualification or relegation
1	Barcelona (C)	38	32	4	2	115	40	+75	100	Qualification for the Champions League group stage
2	Real Madrid	38	26	7	5	103	42	+61	85	Qualification for the Champions League group stage
3	Atlético Madrid	38	23	7	8	65	31	+34	76	Qualification for the Champions League group stage
4	Real Sociedad	38	18	12	8	70	49	+21	66	Qualification for the Champions League play-off round
5	Valencia	38	19	8	11	67	54	+13	65	Qualification for the Europa League group stage (Note: Since the 2012–13 Copa del Rey champions Atlético Madrid and runners-up Real Madrid qualified for the 2013–14 UEFA Champions League, the 5th, 6th and 7th placed teams qualified for the group stage, play-off round, and third qualifying round of the 2013–14 UEFA Europa League respectively.)

Source: La Liga
Rules for classification: 1st points; 2nd head-to-head points; 3rd head-to-head goal difference; 4th goal difference; 5th number of goals scored; 7th Fair-play points
(C) Champions

==== Results by round ====
Round	1	2	3	4	5	6	7	8	9	10	11	12	13	14	15	16	17	18	19	20	21	22	23	24	25	26	27	28	29	30	31	32	33	34	35	36	37	38
Ground	A	H	H	H	A	A	H	A	H	A	H	A	H	A	H	A	H	A	H	H	A	H	A	A	H	A	H	A	H	A	H	A	H	A	A	H	H	A
Result	D	W	W	W	W	W	W	W	W	L	W	W	W	L	W	L	W	D	W	W	L	W	L	W	W	D	L	W	D	D	W	W	L	D	W	L	D	W
Position	9	4	2	2	2	2	2	2	2	2	2	2	2	2	2	2	2	2	2	2	2	2	2	2	2	2	3	3	3	3	3	3	3	3	3	3	3	3

Updated to match(es) played on 26 May 2013. Source: La Liga
A = Away; H = Home; W = Win; D = Draw; L = Loss

==== Matches ====
19 August 2012 1	Levante	1–1	Atlético Madrid	Valencia
23:00	El Zhar 5'; Ballesteros (yellow card) 55'; Juanlu (yellow card) 76'	Report	Turan 22'; Díaz (yellow card) 70'	Stadium: Ciutat de València; Attendance: 15,000; Referee: Carlos Clos Gómez (Aragon)

27 August 2012 2	Atlético Madrid	4–0	Athletic Bilbao	Madrid
22:00	Falcao 20', 42', 59' (pen.); Filipe Luís (yellow card) 44'; Gabi (yellow card) 80'; Tiago 84'; Miranda (yellow card) 90+3'	Report	Gurpegui (yellow card) 12'; Pérez (yellow card) 35'; De Marcos (yellow card) 90+1'	Stadium: Vicente Calderón; Attendance: 35,000; Referee: Fernando Teixeira Vitienes (Cantabria)

16 September 2012 3	Atlético Madrid	4–3	Rayo Vallecano	Madrid
21:30	Suárez 26'; Koke 49'; Turan 51'; Falcao 56' (pen.)	Report	José Carlos (yellow card) 42'; Fuego (yellow card) 55'; Adrián (yellow card) 68'; Delibašić 82', 85'; Baptistão 89'	Stadium: Vicente Calderón; Attendance: 42,000; Referee: Javier Estrada Fernández (Catalonia)

23 September 2012 4	Atlético Madrid	2–1	Real Valladolid	Madrid
18:00	Miranda (yellow card) 23'; Godín 31'; Gabi (yellow card) 42'; Falcao 45' (pen.)	Report	Óscar (yellow card) 11'; Pérez (yellow card) 28'; Ramos (yellow card) 34'; Rukavina (yellow card) 39'; Bueno (yellow card) 45+1', (goal) 55'; Manucho (yellow card) 70'	Stadium: Vicente Calderón; Attendance: 47,000; Referee: César Muñiz Fernández (Asturias)

26 September 2012 5	Real Betis	2–4	Atlético Madrid	Seville
21:00	Nélson (yellow card) 3'; Agra 25'; Nono (yellow card) 29'; Juanfran 45+1' (o.g.); Perquis (red card) 47'; Beñat (yellow card) 48'; Campbell (yellow card) 63' (yellow-red card) 78'	Report	Juanfran (yellow card) 23'; Falcao 28', 48' (pen.); Rodríguez (yellow card) 53'; Costa 55'; García (yellow card) 88', (goal) 90+3'	Stadium: Benito Villamarín; Attendance: 33,261; Referee: Alfonso Álvarez Izquierdo (Catalonia)
Note: Originally scheduled for 3 September 2012 but moved due to the 2012 UEFA Super Cup.

30 September 2012 6	Espanyol	0–1	Atlético Madrid	Cornellà de Llobregat
22:00	Moreno (yellow card) 43'; Stuani (yellow card) 47'; Forlín (yellow card) 60'	Report	Turan (yellow card) 59'; García 30', (yellow card) 66'; Costa (yellow card) 66'	Stadium: Cornellà-El Prat; Attendance: 30,000; Referee: Ignacio Iglesias Villanueva (Galicia)

7 October 2012 7	Atlético Madrid	2–1	Málaga	Madrid
21:30	Falcao 6', (yellow card) 77'; Filipe Luís (yellow card) 16'; Turan (yellow card) 38'; Suárez (yellow card) 75'; Weligton 90' (o.g.)	Report	Santa Cruz 36'; Camacho (yellow card) 51'; Iturra (yellow card) 58'; Monreal (yellow card) 88'	Stadium: Vicente Calderón; Attendance: 42,000; Referee: Miguel Ángel Pérez Lasa (Basque Country)

21 October 2012 8	Real Sociedad	0–1	Atlético Madrid	San Sebastián
21:30	Bergara (yellow card) 23'; De la Bella (yellow card) 33'; I. Martínez (yellow card) 53'; Estrada (yellow card) 81'; Illarramendi (yellow card) 89'	Report	Filipe Luís (yellow card) 67'; Godín (yellow card) 77'; Falcao 90'	Stadium: Anoeta; Attendance: 27,000; Referee: Miguel Ángel Ayza Gámez (Valencian Community)

28 October 2012 9	Atlético Madrid	3–1	Osasuna	Madrid
19:45	Miranda (yellow card) 8', (goal) 31'; Godín (yellow card) 25'; García 35'; Falcao (yellow card) 66', (goal) 73'	Report	Lamah (yellow card) 31', (goal) 43'; Arribas (yellow card) 40'; Lolo (yellow card) 90'	Stadium: Vicente Calderón; Attendance: 45,000; Referee: Antonio Mateu Lahoz (Valencian Community)

4 November 2012 10	Valencia	2–0	Atlético Madrid	Valencia
22:00	Soldado 20'; R. Costa (yellow card) 62' (yellow-red card) 90'; Ruiz (yellow card) 65'; Pereira (yellow card) 86'; Cissokho (yellow card) 87'; Valdez 90+5'		Turan (yellow card) 19'; Tiago (yellow card) 61'; Miranda (yellow card) 87'; Falcao (yellow card) 88'	Stadium: Mestalla; Attendance: 40,000; Referee: Fernando Teixeira Vitienes (Cantabria)

11 November 2012 11	Atlético Madrid	2–0	Getafe	Madrid
19:45	Adrián 24'; Turan 43'; Gabi (yellow card) 60'; Suárez (yellow card) 89'	Report	Rodríguez (yellow card) 19'; Alexis (yellow card) 27'; Castro (yellow card) 39'; Álvaro (yellow card) 43'; Torres (yellow card) 58'	Stadium: Vicente Calderón; Attendance: 45,000; Referee: José Luis Paradas Romero (Andalusia)

18 November 2012 12	Granada	0–1	Atlético Madrid	Granada
19:45			Turan 61'	Stadium: Nuevo Los Cármenes; Attendance: 22,500; Referee: José Luis González González (Castile and León)

25 November 2012 13	Atlético Madrid	4–0	Sevilla	Madrid
18:00	Falcao 22' (pen.); Spahić 40' (o.g.); Koke 44', (yellow card) 50'; Miranda 90+2'		Fazio (red card) 21'; Spahić (yellow card) 24'; Maduro (yellow card) 34'; Rakitić (yellow card) 78' (yellow-red card) 83'; Luna (red card) 80'	Stadium: Vicente Calderón; Attendance: 46,000; Referee: Ignacio Iglesias Villanueva (Galicia)

1 December 2012 14	Real Madrid	2–0	Atlético Madrid	Madrid
22:00	Ronaldo 16'; Khedira (yellow card) 24'; Özil 60'		Turan (yellow card) 15'; Juanfran (yellow card) 60'; Miranda (yellow card) 74'; Suárez (yellow card) 79'; Falcao (yellow card) 85'	Stadium: Santiago Bernabéu; Attendance: 83,000; Referee: Alberto Undiano Mallenco (Navarre)

9 December 2012 15	Atlético Madrid	6–0	Deportivo La Coruña	Madrid
19:00	Costa 23'; Falcao 28', 42', 64' (pen.), 68', 71'		Camuñas (yellow card) 18'; Bergantiños (yellow card) 41'	Stadium: Vicente Calderón; Attendance: 40,000; Referee: Alejandro José Hernández Hernández (Canary Islands)

16 December 2012 16	Barcelona	4–1	Atlético Madrid	Barcelona
21:00	Adriano 36'; Busquets 45'; Messi 57', 88'; Thiago (yellow card) 86'		Falcao 31'; Suárez (yellow card) 47'	Stadium: Camp Nou; Attendance: 86,837; Referee: Miguel Ángel Pérez Lasa (Basque Country)

21 December 2012 17	Atlético Madrid	1–0	Celta Vigo	Madrid
22:00	Turan (yellow card) 33'; Miranda (yellow card) 55' (yellow-red card) 86'; Adrián 77'; Falcao (yellow card) 82'		Túñez (yellow card) 36'; Varas (yellow card) 62'; Vila (yellow card) 83'	Stadium: Vicente Calderón; Attendance: 45,000; Referee: Pedro Jesús Pérez Montero (Andalusia)

6 January 2013 18	Mallorca	1–1	Atlético Madrid	Palma
21:00	Nunes (yellow card) 78'; Kevin 87'		García (yellow card) 19', (goal) 72'; Tiago (yellow card) 31'; Costa (yellow card) 89'	Stadium: Iberostar; Attendance: 10,700; Referee: Antonio Mateu Lahoz (Valencian Community)

13 January 2013 19	Atlético Madrid	2–0	Zaragoza	Madrid
19:00	Tiago 31'; Falcao 37' (pen.); Miranda (yellow card) 90+3'		Paredes (yellow card) 26'; Săpunaru (yellow card) 37'; José Mari (yellow card) 75'	Stadium: Vicente Calderón; Attendance: 45,000; Referee: José Luis González González (Castile-León)

20 January 2013 20	Atlético Madrid	2–0	Levante	Madrid
19:00	Gabi (yellow card) 20'; Adrián 32'; Koke 60'	Report	López (yellow card) 41'; Míchel (yellow card) 50'; Munúa (yellow card) 78'; Ballesteros (yellow card) 90+3'	Stadium: Vicente Calderón; Attendance: 35,000; Referee: Carlos Delgado Ferreiro (Basque Country)

27 January 2013 21	Athletic Bilbao	3–0	Atlético Madrid	Bilbao
21:00	San José 50'; Herrera (yellow card) 55'; Aduriz (yellow card) 55'; Susaeta 77'; De Marcos 84'	Report	Filipe Luís (yellow card) 36'; Rodríguez (yellow card) 54'; Godín (yellow card) 55'	Stadium: San Mamés; Attendance: 30,000; Referee: César Muñiz Fernández (Asturias)

3 February 2013 22	Atlético Madrid	1–0	Real Betis	Madrid
21:00	Costa 61', (yellow card) 66'; Miranda (yellow card) 68'; Cisma (yellow card) 90+1'	Report	Perquis (yellow card) 68'; Chica (yellow card) 68'; Cañas (yellow card) 70'; Nacho (yellow card) 78'	Stadium: Vicente Calderón; Attendance: 35,000; Referee: Alberto Undiano Mallenco (Navarre)

10 February 2013 23	Rayo Vallecano	2–1	Atlético Madrid	Vallecas
21:00	Bangoura 3'; Baptistão 33'; Fuego (yellow card) 51'; Trashorras (yellow card) 88'	Report	Díaz (yellow card) 74'; Gabi (yellow card) 74'; Falcao 90+5'	Stadium: Campo de Vallecas; Attendance: 9,538; Referee: Xavier Estrada Fernández (Catalonia)

17 February 2013 24	Real Valladolid	0–3	Atlético Madrid	Valladolid
19:00	Rueda (yellow card) 43'; Peña (yellow card) 48'; Óscar (yellow card) 58'; Baraja (yellow card) 90+2'	Report	Falcao 10'; Costa 53'; Rodríguez 90'	Stadium: José Zorrilla; Attendance: 20,007; Referee: Ignacio Iglesias Villanueva (Galicia)

24 February 2013 25	Atlético Madrid	1–0	Espanyol	Madrid
19:00	Tiago (yellow card) 34'; Gabi (yellow card) 34' (yellow-red card); Falcao 38' (pen.); Turan (yellow card) 56'; Courtois (yellow card) 90+2'	Report	Forlín (yellow card) 6'; Casilla (yellow card) 14'; Stuani (yellow card) 34'; Moreno (yellow card) 37'; Colotto (yellow card) 58'; Longo (yellow card) 79'; Sánchez (yellow card) 90+2'	Stadium: Vicente Calderón; Attendance: 40,000; Referee: Carlos Clos Gómez (Aragon)

3 March 2013 26	Málaga	0–0	Atlético Madrid	Málaga
19:00	Weligton (yellow card) 34'; Toulalan (yellow card) 86'	Report	Juanfran (yellow card) 17'; Suárez (yellow card) 38'; Costa (yellow card) 58'; Koke (yellow card) 81'	Stadium: La Rosaleda; Attendance: 27,000; Referee: Jesús Gil Manzano (Extremadura)

10 March 2013 27	Atlético Madrid	0–1	Real Sociedad	Madrid
21:00	Turan (yellow card) 38'; Juanfran (yellow card) 47'; Godín (yellow card) 59'; Costa (yellow card) 86'; Falcao (yellow card) 90'	Report	Vela (yellow card) 11'; González (yellow card) 16'; Prieto 53'	Stadium: Vicente Calderón; Attendance: 40,000; Referee: Miguel Ángel Ayza Gámez (Basque Country)

17 March 2013 28	Osasuna	0–2	Atlético Madrid	Pamplona
19:00	Damià (yellow card) 39'	Report	Juanfran (yellow card) 7'; Costa 35', 48', (yellow card) 47'; Koke (yellow card) 57'; Gabi (yellow card) 90'	Stadium: El Sadar; Attendance: 19,512; Referee: Pedro Jesús Pérez Montero (Andalusia)

31 March 2013 29	Atlético Madrid	1–1	Valencia	Madrid
21:00	Falcao 6'; Costa (yellow card) 63'; Koke (yellow card) 79'; Filipe Luís (yellow card) 90+2'	Report	Jonas 5'; Parejo (yellow card) 42'; Piatti (yellow card) 52'; Pereira (yellow card) 74'	Stadium: Vicente Calderón; Attendance: 38,000; Referee: Xavier Estrada Fernández (Catalonia)

7 April 2013 30	Getafe	0–0	Atlético Madrid	Getafe
19:00	Alexis (yellow card) 9'; Valera (yellow card) 88'	Summary	Suárez (yellow card) 53' (yellow-red card) 72'; Gabi (yellow card) 68'; Godín (yellow card) 69' (yellow-red card) 90+2'	Stadium: Alfonso Pérez; Attendance: 10,000; Referee: Carlos Delgado Ferreiro (Basque Country)

14 April 2013 31	Atlético Madrid	5–0	Granada	Madrid
17:00	Costa 4'; Falcao 27', 47'; García 63'; Miranda (yellow card) 65'; Filipe Luís 70'	Summary	Nyom (yellow card) 34'; Brahimi (yellow card) 53'; Ighalo (yellow card) 54'	Stadium: Vicente Calderón; Attendance: 53,000; Referee: Ignacio Iglesias Villanueva (Galicia)

21 April 2013 32	Sevilla	0–1	Atlético Madrid	Seville
21:00	Botía (yellow card) 37'	Report	Falcao (yellow card) 11', (goal) 76'; Godín (yellow card) 24'; Suárez (yellow card) 57'; Costa (yellow card) 59'; Courtois (yellow card) 90'	Stadium: Ramón Sánchez Pizjuán; Attendance: 35,000; Referee: José Luis González González (Castile-León)

27 April 2013 33	Atlético Madrid	1–2	Real Madrid	Madrid
20:00	Falcao 4'; Filipe Luís (yellow card) 12'; Koke (yellow card) 25'; García (yellow card) 61'; Costa (yellow card) 74'	Report	Albiol (yellow card) 7'; Juanfran 13' (o.g.); Khedira (yellow card) 18'; Pepe (yellow card) 19'; Morata (yellow card) 41'; Di María 63'	Stadium: Vicente Calderón; Attendance: 53,000; Referee: Miguel Ángel Pérez Lasa (Basque Country)

4 May 2013 34	Deportivo La Coruña	0–0	Atlético Madrid	A Coruña
22:00	Gama (yellow card) 90+1'		Godín (yellow card) 42'	Stadium: Riazor; Attendance: 34,611; Referee: Miguel Ángel Ayza Gámez (Basque Country)

8 May 2013 35	Celta Vigo	1–3	Atlético Madrid	Vigo
19:30	López (yellow card) 21'; Jonny (yellow card) 26'; Lago (yellow card) 43'; Fernández 84'		Suárez (yellow card) 23'; Godín (yellow card) 33'; Costa 47'; Gabi (yellow card) 57'; Tiago (yellow card) 60'; Juanfran 66'; Falcao 86'	Stadium: Balaídos; Attendance: 25,000; Referee: José Antonio Teixeira Vitienes (Cantabria)

12 May 2013 36	Atlético Madrid	1–2	Barcelona	Madrid
19:00	Falcao 51'; Insúa (yellow card) 90'	Report	Sánchez 72', (yellow card) 73'; Fàbregas (yellow card) 74'; Gabi 82' (o.g.)	Stadium: Vicente Calderón; Attendance: 54,000; Referee: Pedro Jesús Pérez Montero (Andalusia)

26 May 2013 37	Atlético Madrid	0–0	Mallorca	Madrid
20:00	Costa (yellow card) 15'; Gabi (yellow card) 48'; Miranda (yellow card) 60'; Suárez (yellow card) 81'; Godín (yellow card) 83'	Report	Víctor (yellow card) 17'; Nsue (yellow card) 62'; Márquez (yellow card) 71'; Pereira (yellow card) 90+4'	Stadium: Vicente Calderón; Attendance: 50,000; Referee: Fernando Teixeira Vitienes (Cantabria)

1 June 2013 38	Zaragoza	1–3	Atlético Madrid	Zaragoza
21:00	Postiga (yellow card) 58', (goal) 89'; Franco (yellow card) 75'	Report	Tiago (yellow card) 35'; Turan 84'; Costa 90', 90+1'	Stadium: La Romareda; Attendance: 28,000; Referee: Javier Estrada Fernández (Catalonia)

=== Copa del Rey ===
==== Round of 32 ====
31 October 2012 First leg	Real Jaén	0–3	Atlético Madrid	Jaén
20:00	Gaitán (yellow card) 22'; Torres (red card) 26'; García (yellow card) 27'	Report	Costa 28' (pen.); Gabi (yellow card) 53'; Adrián 62'; Sílvio (yellow card) 70'; Suárez (yellow card) 90+1'; García 90+3'	Stadium: Nuevo La Victoria; Attendance: 17,000; Referee: Carlos Delgado Ferreiro (Basque Country)

28 November 2012 Second leg	Atlético Madrid	1–0 (4–0 agg.)	Real Jaén	Madrid
19:30	García 15'	Report		Stadium: Vicente Calderón; Attendance: 7,000; Referee: César Muñiz Fernández (Asturias)

==== Round of 16 ====
12 December 2012 First leg	Atlético Madrid	3–0	Getafe	Madrid
22:00 CET	Costa 19' (pen.), 87'; Filipe Luís 80'	Report		Stadium: Vicente Calderón; Attendance: 7,000; Referee: Antonio Mateu Lahoz (Valencian Community)

10 January 2013 Second leg	Getafe	0–0 (3–0 agg.)	Atlético Madrid	Getafe
19:30 CET				Stadium: Coliseum Alfonso Pérez

==== Quarter-finals ====
18 January 2013 First leg	Atlético Madrid	2–0	Real Betis	Madrid
22:00 CET	Falcao 11'; Filipe Luís 23'			Stadium: Vicente Calderón; Referee: Alberto Undiano Mallenco (Navarre)

25 January 2013 Second leg	Real Betis	1–1 (3–1 agg.)	Atlético Madrid	Seville
20:00 CET	Molina 90' (pen.)		Costa 45'	Stadium: Benito Villamarín; Referee: Carlos Clos Gómez (Aragon)

==== Semi-finals ====
31 January 2013 First leg	Atlético Madrid	2–1	Sevilla	Madrid
22:00 CET	Costa 50' (pen.), 71' (pen.)		Negredo 56' (pen.)	Stadium: Vicente Calderón; Referee: Miguel Ángel Ayza Gámez (Valencian Community)

27 February 2013 Second leg	Sevilla	2–2 (3–4 agg.)	Atlético Madrid	Seville
22:00 CET	Navas 39'; Rakitić 90+1'		Costa 6'; Falcao 29'	Stadium: Ramón Sánchez Pizjuán; Attendance: 45,000; Referee: Fernando Teixeira Vitienes (Cantabria)

==== Final ====
17 May 2013 Final	Real Madrid	1–2 (a.e.t.)	Atlético Madrid	Madrid
21:30 CEST (UTC+02:00)	Ronaldo 14', (yellow card) 90+3' (red card) 114'; Coentrão (yellow card) 54'; Khedira (yellow card) 65'; Özil (yellow card) 72'; Ramos (yellow card) 74'; Essien (yellow card) 101'; Di María (yellow card) 119'		Costa 35', (yellow card) 69'; Turan (yellow card) 37'; Miranda 98', (yellow card) 120+3'; Suárez (yellow card) 100'; Koke (yellow card) 105+1'; Gabi (yellow card) 114' (yellow-red card) 120+5'	Stadium: Santiago Bernabéu; Referee: Carlos Clos Gómez (Aragon)
Note: José Mourinho was expelled for protesting in the 76th minute.

=== UEFA Europa League ===
==== Group stage ====
Pos	Team	Pld	W	D	L	GF	GA	GD	Pts	Qualification
1	(Czech Republic) Viktoria Plzeň	6	4	1	1	11	4	+7	13	Advance to knockout phase
2	(Spain) Atlético Madrid	6	4	0	2	7	4	+3	12	Advance to knockout phase
3	(Portugal) Académica	6	1	2	3	6	9	−3	5	
4	(Israel) Hapoel Tel Aviv	6	1	1	4	4	11	−7	4	

Source: Soccerway

20 September 2012 1	Hapoel Tel Aviv (Israel)	0–3	(Spain) Atlético Madrid	Tel Aviv, Israel
19:00 CEST	Shushan (yellow card) 49'; Djemba-Djemba (yellow card) 67'; Paintsil (yellow card) 88'	Report	Rodríguez 37'; Costa 40', (yellow card) 67'; García 63'; Sílvio (yellow card) 68'	Stadium: Bloomfield Stadium; Attendance: 13,000; Referee: Pol van Boekel (Netherlands)

4 October 2012 2	Atlético Madrid (Spain)	1–0	(Czech Republic) Viktoria Plzeň	Madrid, Spain
21:05 CEST	Gabi (yellow card) 11'; Belözoğlu (yellow card) 20'; Rodríguez 90+3'	Report	Procházka (yellow card) 31'	Stadium: Vicente Calderón; Attendance: 20,000; Referee: Antony Gautier (France)

25 October 2012 3	Atlético Madrid (Spain)	2–1	(Portugal) Académica	Madrid, Spain
21:05 CEST	Costa 48'; Belözoğlu 67'; Saúl (yellow card) 86'	Report	Lopes (yellow card) 62'; Cissé 85'; Bruno China (yellow card) 90+1'	Stadium: Vicente Calderón; Attendance: 13,000; Referee: Bobby Madden (Scotland)

8 November 2012 4	Académica (Portugal)	2–0	(Spain) Atlético Madrid	Coimbra, Portugal
19:00 CET	Eduardo 28', 70' (pen.)	Report		Stadium: Cidade de Coimbra; Attendance: 4,652; Referee: Lee Probert (England)

22 November 2012 5	Atlético Madrid (Spain)	1–0	(Israel) Hapoel Tel Aviv	Madrid, Spain
21:05 CET	Raúl García 7', (yellow card) 29'; Rodríguez (yellow card) 78'	Report	Paintsil (yellow card) 73'	Stadium: Vicente Calderón; Attendance: 13,595; Referee: Martin Hansson (Sweden)

6 December 2012 6	Viktoria Plzeň (Czech Republic)	1–0	(Spain) Atlético Madrid	Plzeň, Czech Republic
19:00 CET	Procházka 26'	Report		Stadium: Stadion města Plzně; Attendance: 11,067; Referee: Kristinn Jakobsson (Iceland)

==== Knockout phase ====
===== Round of 32 =====
14 February 2013 First leg	Atlético Madrid (Spain)	0–2	(Russia) Rubin Kazan	Madrid, Spain
21:05 CET		Report	Karadeniz 6'; Orbaiz 90+5'	Stadium: Vicente Calderón; Attendance: 25,000; Referee: István Vad (Hungary)

21 February 2013 Second leg	Rubin Kazan (Russia)	0–1	(Spain) Atlético Madrid	Moscow, Russia
18:00 CET		Report	Falcao 84'	Stadium: Luzhniki Stadium; Attendance: 2,593; Referee: Ovidiu Haţegan (Romania)

== Squad ==
As of 31 June 2013.

=== Team stats ===
No.	Pos.	Name	La Liga		Copa del Rey		Europe		Super Cup		Total		Discipline			Notes
No.	Pos.	Name	Apps	Goals	Apps	Goals	Apps	Goals	Apps	Goals	Apps	Goals	Yellow card	Yellow-red card	Red card	Notes
1	GK	(Spain) Sergio Asenjo	1	0	1	0	8	0	0	0	10	0	0	0	0	
13	GK	(Belgium) Thibaut Courtois	37	0	8	0	0	0	1	0	46	0	0	0	0	on loan from (England) Chelsea
25	GK	(Spain) Joel Robles	0	0	0	0	0	0	0	0	0	0	0	0	0	
2	DF	(Uruguay) Diego Godín	35	1	5	0	1	0	1	0	42	1	1	0	0	
3	DF	(Brazil) Filipe Luís	32	1	6	2	3	0	1	0	42	3	2	0	0	
12	DF	(Spain) Jorge Pulido	1	0	2	0	5	0	0	0	8	0	0	0	0	
15	DF	(Spain) Domingo Cisma	2	0	3	0	5	0	0	0	10	0	0	0	0	
17	DF	(Portugal) Sílvio	1	0	2	0	4	0	0	0	7	0	2	0	0	on loan to (Spain) Deportivo
18	DF	(Argentina) Cata Díaz	7+2	0	4+2	0	7	0	0	0	18+4	0	1	0	0	
20	DF	(Spain) Juanfran	35	1	6	0	3+1	0	1	0	44+1	1	2	0	0	
22	DF	(Argentina) Emiliano Insúa	2+1	0	0	0	0+3	0	0	0	2+4	0	0	0	0	
23	DF	(Brazil) Miranda	35	2	7	1	3	0	1	1	45	4	4	0	0	
26	DF	(Spain) Javier Manquillo	2+1	0	2+2	0	2	0	0	0	6+3	0	0	0	0	
42	DF	(Tunisia) Kader	0+1	0	0	0	1+1	0	0	0	1+2	0	0	0	0	
4	MF	(Spain) Mario Suárez	23+6	1	7+1	0	5	0	1	0	35+7	1	3	0	0	
5	MF	(Portugal) Tiago (VC)	14+8	2	2+1	0	4+1	0	0	0	20+10	2	0	0	0	
6	MF	(Spain) Koke	29+4	3	5+2	0	3+4	0	1	0	38+10	3	0	0	0	
8	MF	(Spain) Raúl García	13+17	5	5+3	2	5+2	2	0+1	0	23+23	9	1	0	0	
10	MF	(Turkey) Arda Turan	26+6	5	7	0	0	0	1	0	23+2	4	3	0	0	
11	MF	(Uruguay) Cristian Rodríguez	12+21	1	3+5	0	5+1	2	0+1	0	20+28	3	1	0	0	
14	MF	(Spain) Gabi (C)	34+1	1	7+1	0	2	0	1	0	44+2	1	3	0	0	
21	MF	(Turkey) Emre Belözoğlu	4+3	0	2+1	0	5+1	1	0+1	0	13+6	1	0	0	0	
28	MF	(Spain) Saúl	0+2	0	0+2	0	2+5	0	0	0	2+9	0	1	0	0	
30	MF	(Spain) Óliver	0+8	0	0+2	0	0	0	0	0	0+10	0	0	0	0	
7	FW	(Spain) Adrián	15+17	3	4+2	1	8	0	1	0	28+19	4	0	0	0	
9	FW	(Colombia) Radamel Falcao (2nd VC)	34	28	4	2	2	1	1	3	41	34	3	0	0	
19	FW	(Brazil) Diego Costa	24+7	10	7+1	8	5	2	0	0	36+8	20	2	0	0	
27	FW	(Spain) Pedro Martín	0	0	0	0	0+3	0	0	0	0+3	0	0	0	0	
34	F	(Spain) Dani Aquino	0+1	0	0	0	0+3	0	0	0	0+4	0	0	0	0	

=== Goalscorers ===
Rank	Position	Number	Player	La Liga	UEFA Super Cup	Copa del Rey	UEFA Europa League	Total
1	FW	9	(Colombia) Radamel Falcao	28	3	2	1	34
2	FW	19	(Brazil) Diego Costa	10	0	8	2	20
3	MF	8	(Spain) Raúl García	5	0	2	2	9
4	MF	10	(Turkey) Arda Turan	5	0	0	0	5
5	FW	7	(Spain) Adrián	3	0	1	0	4
5	DF	23	(Brazil) Miranda	2	1	1	0	4
7	DF	3	(Brazil) Filipe Luís	1	0	2	0	3
7	DF	6	(Spain) Koke	3	0	0	0	3
7	DF	11	(Uruguay) Cristian Rodríguez	1	0	0	2	3
10	MF	5	(Portugal) Tiago	2	0	0	0	2
11	DF	2	(Uruguay) Diego Godín	1	0	0	0	1
11	MF	4	(Spain) Mario Suárez	1	0	0	0	1
11	DF	20	(Spain) Juanfran	1	0	0	0	1
11	DF	21	(Turkey) Emre Belözoğlu^{1}	0	0	0	1	1
Own goals				2	0	0	0	2
Totals				65	4	16	8	93

^{1}Player left the club during the season.
