= Abdelkader Oueslati =

Footballer (born 1991)

Kader
Personal information
- Full name: Abdelkader Oueslati Kaabi
- Date of birth: 7 October 1991 (age 35)
- Place of birth: Décines-Charpieu, France
- Height: 1.85 m (6 ft 1 in)
- Positions: Right-back; winger

Team information
- Current team: Club Africain

Youth career
- 2006–2009: Sporting Toulon Var
- 2009–2010: Atlético Madrid

Senior career*
Years	Team	Apps	(Gls)
2010–2014	Atlético Madrid B	69	(4)
2012–2015	Atlético Madrid	1	(0)
2014–2015	→ Numancia (loan)	16	(0)
2015–2017	Club Africain	32	(5)
2017	→ Al-Fateh (loan)	9	(3)
2017–2019	Al-Fateh	46	(13)
2020–	Club Africain	1	(0)

International career
2012–2016	Tunisia	8	(0)
- * Club domestic league appearances and goals as of 20:24, 11 November 2020 (UTC)

Abdelkader Oueslati Kaabi (Arabic: عبد القادر الوسلاتي; born 7 October 1991), commonly known as Kader, is a footballer who plays for Club Africain as a right-back or winger. Born in France, he represents Tunisia at international level.

== Club career ==
Born in Décines-Charpieu, Rhône-Alpes, Kader joined Atlético Madrid's youth setup in 2009, aged 18. He made his senior debuts with the reserves, spending several seasons in Segunda División B.

Kader made his debut with the Colchoneros' first team on 19 August 2012, replacing Sívlio midway through the second half of a 1–1 La Liga draw against Levante UD.

On 14 August 2014, Kader joined Segunda División's CD Numancia in a season-long loan. On 1 August of the following year he moved to Club Africain, after agreeing to a three-year deal.

== International career ==
Kader was first called up for the Tunisia national team on 2 October 2012 in a 2013 ACN qualification game against Sierra Leone on 13 October 2012 in Monastir, Tunisia.

== Career statistics ==
=== Club ===
As of match played 7 March 2021

Appearances and goals by club, season and competition
Club	Season	League			National cup		League cup		Continental		Other		Total	
Club	Season	Division	Apps	Goals	Apps	Goals	Apps	Goals	Apps	Goals	Apps	Goals	Apps	Goals
Atlético Madrid B	2010–11	Segunda División B	23	3	—		—		—		—		23	3
Atlético Madrid B	2011–12	Segunda División B	14	0	—		—		—		—		14	0
Atlético Madrid B	2012–13	Segunda División B	32	1	—		—		—		2	0	34	1
Atlético Madrid B	Total		69	4	—		—		—		2	0	71	4
Atlético Madrid	2011–12	La Liga	0	0	0	0	—		0	0	—		0	0
Atlético Madrid	2012–13	La Liga	1	0	0	0	—		2	0	—		3	0
Atlético Madrid	Total		1	0	0	0	—		2	0	—		3	0
Numancia (loan)	2014–15	Segunda División	16	0	1	0	—		—		—		17	0
Club Africain	2015–16	Tunisian Ligue Professionnelle 1	23	3	2	0	—		2	0	—		27	3
Club Africain	2016–17	Tunisian Ligue Professionnelle 1	9	2	2	0	—		—		—		11	2
Club Africain	Total		32	5	4	0	—		2	0	—		38	5
Al-Fateh (loan)	2016–17	Saudi Pro League	9	3	1	0	—		4	0	—		14	3
Al-Fateh	2017–18	Saudi Pro League	22	7	2	0	1	1	—		—		25	8
Al-Fateh	2018–19	Saudi Pro League	22	6	1	0	—		—		—		23	6
Al-Fateh	2019–20	Saudi Pro League	2	0	—		—		—		—		2	0
Al-Fateh	Total		55	16	4	0	1	1	4	0	—		64	17
Club Africain	2019–20	Tunisian Ligue Professionnelle 1	1	0	0	0	—		—		—		1	0
Club Africain	2020–21	Tunisian Ligue Professionnelle 1	4	0	0	0	—		—		—		4	0
Club Africain	Total		5	0	0	0	—		—		—		5	0
Career total			178	25	9	0	1	1	8	0	2	0	198	26
