= Miranda (footballer, born 1984) =

Brazilian footballer

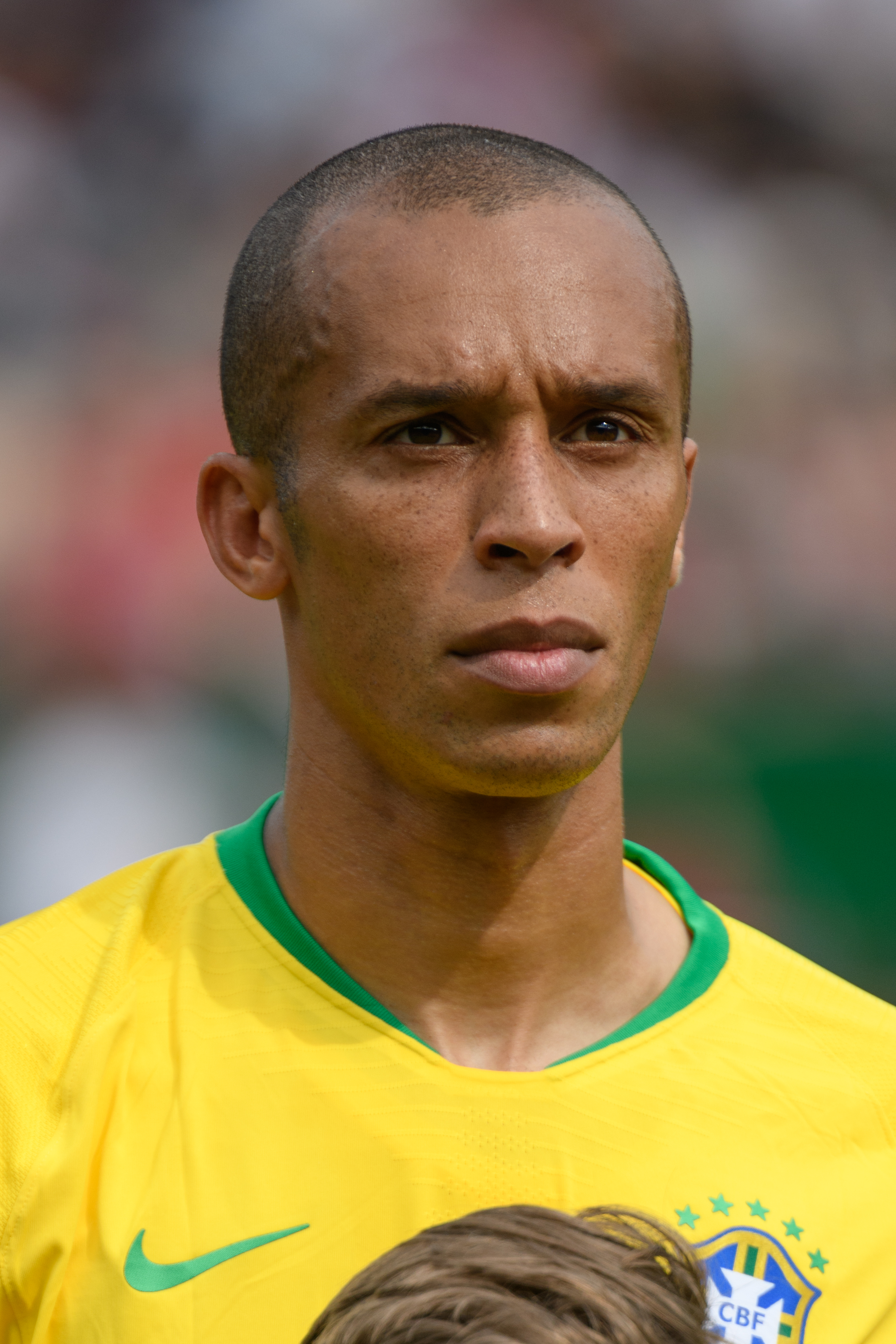
- Miranda with Brazil in 2018

Personal information
- Full name: João Miranda de Souza Filho
- Date of birth: 7 September 1984 (age 42)
- Place of birth: Paranavaí, Brazil
- Height: 1.86 m (6 ft 1 in)
- Position: Centre-back

Youth career
- 2000–2001: Portuguesa Londrinense
- 2001–2004: Coritiba

Senior career*
Years	Team	Apps	(Gls)
2004–2005	Coritiba	49	(2)
2005–2006	Sochaux	20	(0)
2006–2011	São Paulo	216	(7)
2011–2015	Atlético Madrid	117	(8)
2015–2019	Inter Milan	110	(1)
2019–2020	Jiangsu Suning	28	(2)
2021–2022	São Paulo	57	(1)
Total		596	(21)

International career
2009–2019	Brazil	58	(3)
Medal record
Men's football
Representing Brazil
Copa América
Winner	2019 Brazil
FIFA Confederations Cup
Winner	2009 South Africa
- * Club domestic league appearances and goals

João Miranda de Souza Filho (born 7 September 1984), known as Miranda, is a Brazilian former professional footballer who played as a centre-back.

Having begun his career at Coritiba, Miranda spent the 2005–06 season with Sochaux in France before going to Brazil to play for São Paulo. He won three consecutive Campeonato Brasileiro Série A titles, and was named in the Team of the Year four consecutive times from 2007 to 2010. In 2011, he joined Atlético Madrid, where he won domestic and European honours, leaving for Inter for €15 million four years later.

Miranda made his full international debut for Brazil in 2009 and was a member of the squad which won the Confederations Cup that year. He also played at three Copa América tournaments and the 2018 FIFA World Cup, captaining Brazil at the Copa América Centenario in 2016 and winning the 2019 Copa América.

== Club career ==
=== Early career and São Paulo ===
Born in Paranavaí, Paraná, Miranda started at Coritiba, where he made 89 appearances and scored 6 goals. On 29 July 2005, Miranda signed a four-year deal with French side Sochaux. Miranda made twenty appearances for Sochaux as the club finished mid-table but he was not able to settle in France and soon moved back to his home country.

Miranda returned to Brazil in August 2006, on loan to São Paulo FC. In March 2007, he signed with São Paulo FC until 2011. In the same year, São Paulo won the 2006 Campeonato Brasileiro. He went on to win the 2007 and the 2008 editions of the Campeonato Brasileiro also, even being selected for the "Team of the Year" in both 2007 and 2008 respectively. While São Paulo failed to win any more national titles during Miranda's stay with the club, his individual performances did not go unheralded, as he was included in a further two "Team of the Year" squads in 2009 and 2010.

=== Atlético Madrid ===
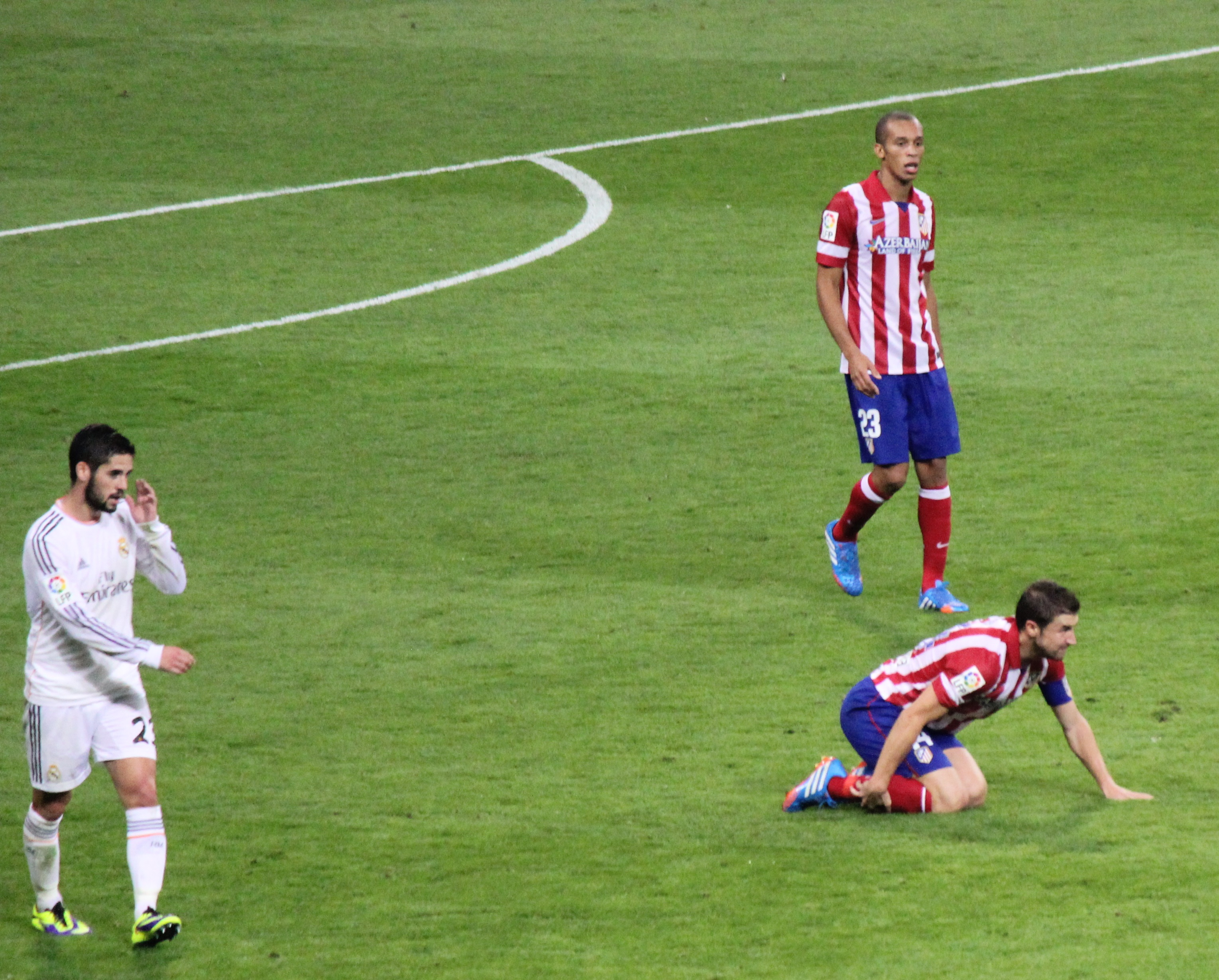
Miranda during the Madrid derby in the 2013–14 season

Miranda joined Spanish side Atlético Madrid in July 2011 upon signing a three-year pre-contractual agreement in January 2011 with Atlético after deciding not to renew his contract with São Paulo which was due to expire in July 2011. Miranda made his competitive debut for his new club on 25 August 2011 in a 4–0 thumping of Portuguese side Vitória S.C. in the second leg of their Europa League playoff round tie. Miranda made his La Liga debut on 10 September in a 1–0 loss to Valencia CF, Roberto Soldado scoring the game's only goal.

The Brazilian defender scored his first goal for the capital club against Granada CF on 11 March 2012, converting a pass from Diego Godín to a goal in the top left corner of the net, pushing the club to a 2–0 league victory. On 8 April, Miranda put in an underwhelming display against fellow Champions League chasing club Levante UD, letting Arouna Koné in for Levante's second goal in the tenth minute and then picking up a red card with seven minutes left; Atlético lost the game 2–0 and Levante moved up to fourth place. His first European goal for the club came later that month against Spanish opposition, scoring Atlético's second goal in an eventual 4–2 first-leg win against Valencia in the semi-finals of their Europa League encounter on 19 April.

Miranda scored Atlético's third goal in their 4–1 UEFA Super Cup thrashing of European Champions Chelsea on 31 August 2012. On 12 March 2013, Miranda renewed his contract with Madrid, keeping him in Spain until 2016. In the Copa del Rey final on 17 May, Miranda provided the match-winner, scoring a header in added time of extra time to give Atlético a 2–1 victory over Real Madrid. This ended a streak of 25 games, stretching back to 1999, without a win against their city rivals.

After helping Atlético to their first league title in 17 years, Miranda was nominated in 2014 as the best defender in La Liga, alongside teammate Filipe Luís and Real Madrid's Sergio Ramos.

=== Inter Milan ===
On 30 June 2015, Serie A club Inter Milan announced that they had signed Miranda on a two-year loan, for €4 million, with an obligation to sign outright for an additional €11 million on 1 July 2017, with conditions that would push the date even earlier. The obligation was activated after Miranda's 2016–17 season debut for Inter on 20 July.

Miranda made his Inter debut on 23 August as they began the season with a 1–0 home win over Atalanta. He played 32 games over the campaign, scoring once in a 3–1 victory against Sampdoria at the San Siro on 20 February 2016. He was also sent off twice in his first year with the Nerazzurri, the first coming on 27 September 2015 for a foul on Nikola Kalinić in a 4–1 home loss to Fiorentina that ended Inter's unbeaten start.

=== Jiangsu Suning ===
On 26 July 2019, it was announced that Miranda's contract with Inter was terminated by a mutual consent. Inter also announced that he was set to join Chinese club Jiangsu Suning. On 28 February 2021, Jiangsu announced that the club would be dissolved, and because of that, all players contracted to the club would be released, including Miranda.

=== Return to São Paulo ===
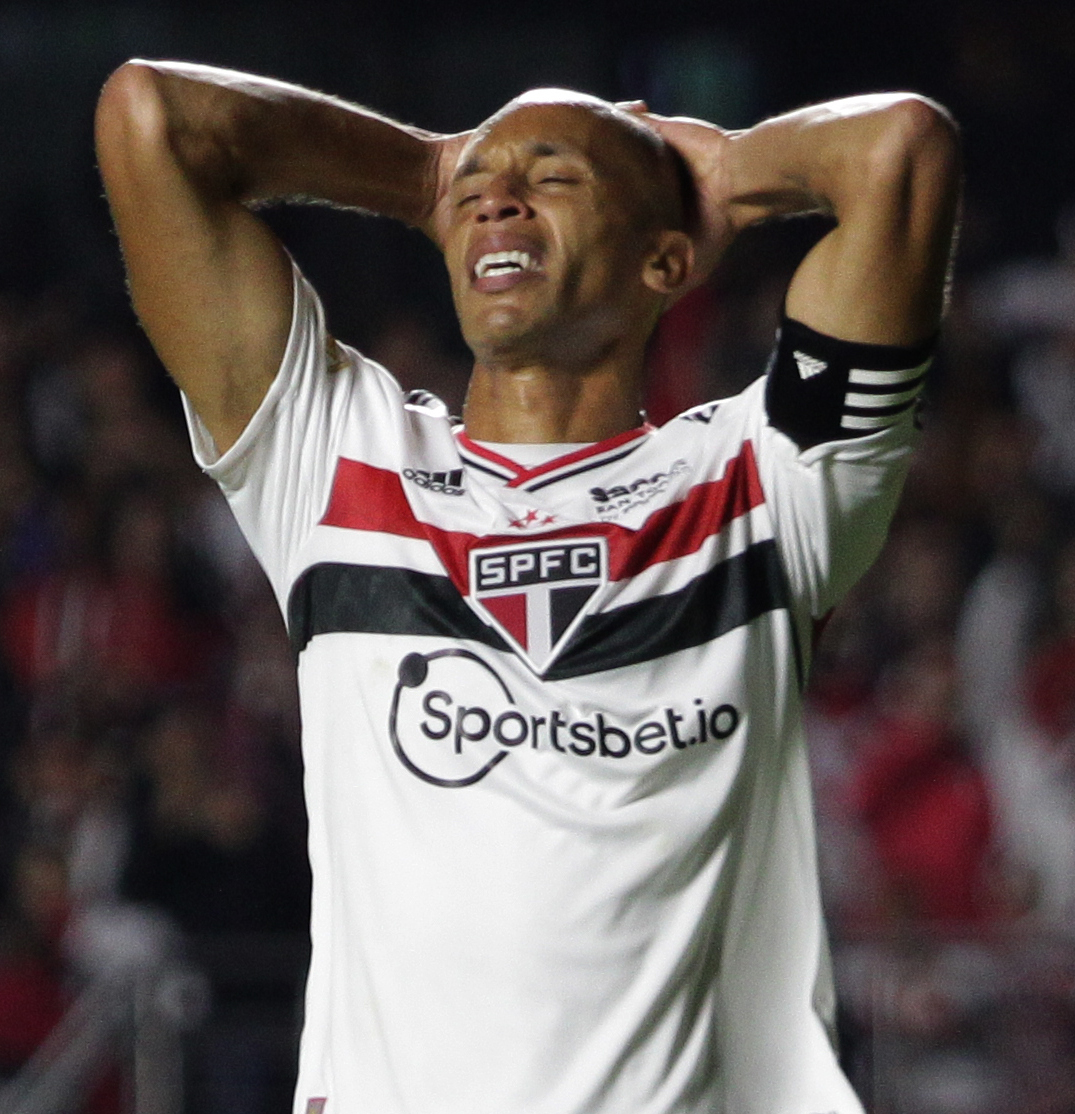
Miranda in 2022

On 6 March 2021, before the derby against Santos at the Campeonato Paulista, São Paulo president Julio Casares confirmed the return of Miranda on a free transfer after days of negotiations. He signed a 1-year and 8-month contract.

=== Retirement ===
On January 11, 2023, Miranda announced his retirement at the age of 38, through his Instagram.

== International career ==
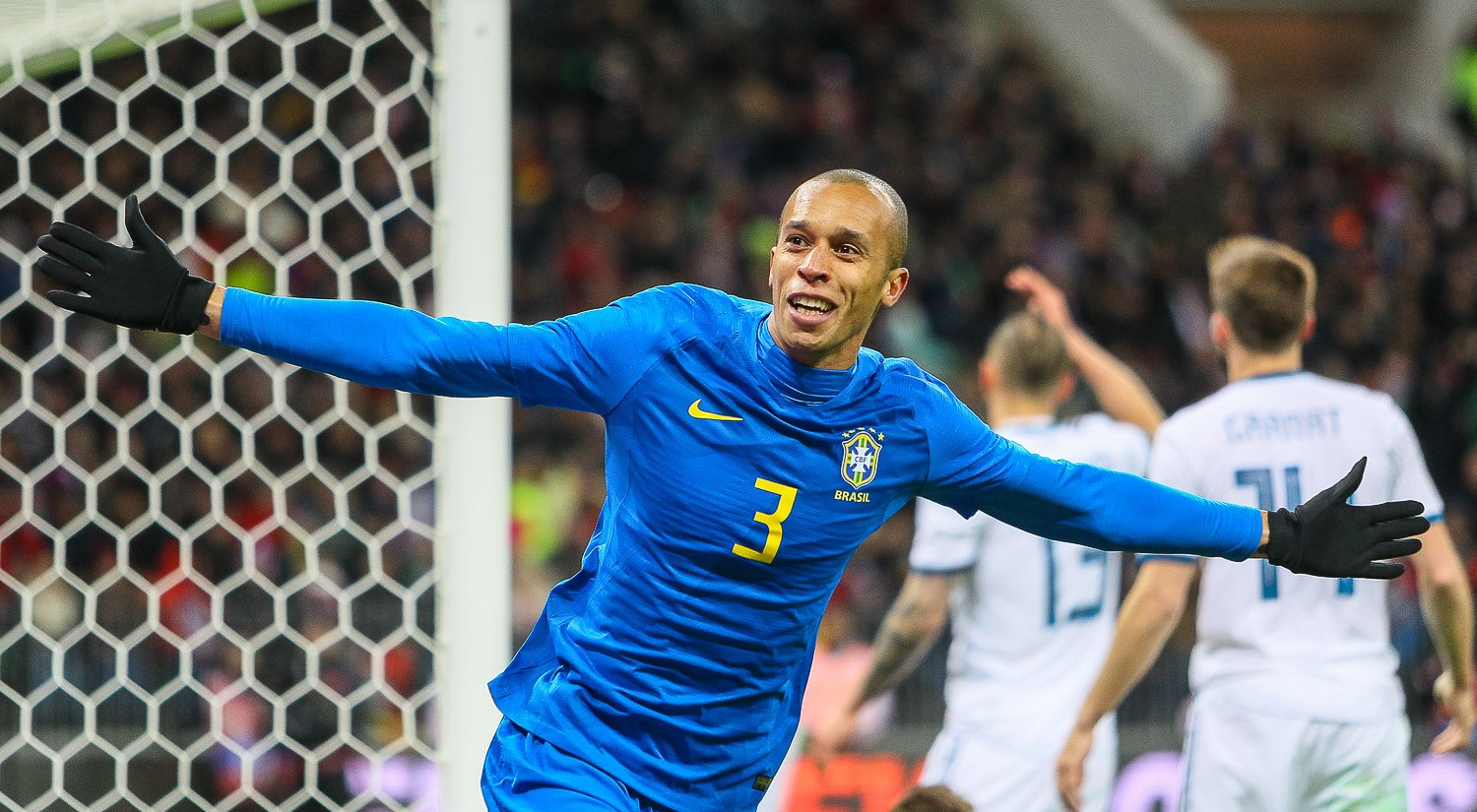
Miranda celebrating his goal in a March 2018 friendly away to Russia

On 20 August 2007, Miranda received his first call-up to the national team, along with Thiago Silva, as a replacement for Lúcio and Luisão in a friendly match against Algeria. However, he did not make his debut as he was only an unused substitute during the match. More than a year later, Miranda made his first international appearance for Brazil in a 2010 FIFA World Cup qualification match against Peru on 1 April 2009. He came on as a substitute for Luisão who was injured during the game.

Miranda was part of the Brazil squad which won the 2009 FIFA Confederations Cup in South Africa. He replaced Kléber at left-back for the second group game against the United States in Pretoria, but he saw himself replaced in the third match by André Santos, who remained in the position for the rest of the tournament.

In January 2013, Miranda was called up for Brazil for the first time since 2009 ahead of a friendly against England; it was the first squad for Luiz Felipe Scolari's return as manager. He was one of seven players put on standby for Brazil's 2014 FIFA World Cup team.

Under new coach Dunga, Miranda became a regular starter in the Brazilian defence, replacing former captain Thiago Silva as David Luiz's central defensive partner. In May 2015, he was included in Brazil's 23-man squad for the 2015 Copa América held in Chile. On 21 June, he replaced the suspended Neymar as captain of the Seleção in a 2–1 win against Venezuela.

In May 2016, Miranda was named as Brazil's captain for the Copa América Centenario in the United States, which ultimately ended in a group stage exit.

Miranda scored his first international goal on 6 September 2016, in the second minute of a 2–1 win over Colombia in a World Cup qualifying match played in Manaus. In May 2018 manager Tite named him in the final 23-man squad for the 2018 FIFA World Cup in Russia, where he played as a starter in the five matches played by Brazil, which was eliminated in the quarterfinals.

In May 2019, Miranda was included in Brazil's 23-man squad for the 2019 Copa América on home soil. He made his only appearance in the competition in Brazil's 2–0 victory over rivals Argentina in the semi-finals of the competition on 2 July, coming on as a second-half substitute for Marquinhos. Brazil subsequently went on to win the title following a 3–1 win over Peru in the final on 7 July, at the Maracanã Stadium. After two years, Miranda was recalled to the Brazil National Team for three World Cup qualifying matches against Chile, Argentina, and Peru. He was a reserve for all three games.

== Personal life ==
Miranda's sons, João Vitor Miranda and Lucas Miranda, are currently players in the youth sectors of FK Dukla Banská Bystrica and São Paulo FC, respectively.

== Career statistics ==
=== Club ===
Appearances and goals by club, season and competition
Club	Season	League			State league		Cup		Continental (Note: Includes continental competitions, such as Copa Libertadores, Recopa Sudamericana, UEFA Champions League and UEFA Europa League)		Other (Note: Includes other competitions, such as Supercopa de España and Coupe de la Ligue)		Total	
Club	Season	Division	Apps	Goals	Apps	Goals	Apps	Goals	Apps	Goals	Apps	Goals	Apps	Goals
Coritiba	2004	Série A	40	2	—		—		—		—		40	2
Coritiba	2005	Série A	9	0	—		—		—		—		9	0
Coritiba	Total		49	2	—		—		—		—		49	2
Sochaux	2005–06	Ligue 1	20	0	—		1	0	—		2	0	23	0
São Paulo	2006	Série A	14	1	—		—		—		—		14	1
São Paulo	2007	Série A	35	2	18	0	—		11	2	—		64	4
São Paulo	2008	Série A	24	0	19	0	—		10	1	—		53	1
São Paulo	2009	Série A	28	0	15	1	—		6	0	—		49	1
São Paulo	2010	Série A	27	1	19	1	—		11	0	—		57	2
São Paulo	2011	Série A	—		17	1	6	0	—		—		23	4
São Paulo	Total		128	4	88	3	6	0	40	3	—		262	10
Atlético Madrid	2011–12	La Liga	27	1	—		2	0	15	1	—		44	2
Atlético Madrid	2012–13	La Liga	35	2	—		7	1	3	0	1	1	46	4
Atlético Madrid	2013–14	La Liga	32	2	—		5	0	13	2	2	0	52	4
Atlético Madrid	2014–15	La Liga	23	3	—		3	0	8	0	2	0	36	3
Atlético Madrid	Total		117	8	—		17	1	39	3	5	1	178	13
Inter Milan	2015–16	Serie A	32	1	—		2	0	—		—		34	1
Inter Milan	2016–17	Serie A	32	0	—		1	0	3	0	—		36	0
Inter Milan	2017–18	Serie A	31	0	—		0	0	—		—		31	0
Inter Milan	2018–19	Serie A	15	0	—		1	0	5	0	—		20	0
Inter Milan	Total		110	1	—		4	0	8	0	—		121	1
Jiangsu Suning	2019	Chinese Super League	9	1	—		0	0	—		—		9	1
Jiangsu Suning	2020	Chinese Super League	19	1	—		0	0	—		—		19	1
Jiangsu Suning	Total		28	2	—		0	0	—		—		28	2
São Paulo	2021	Série A	28	0	7	1	5	0	6	0	—		46	1
São Paulo	2022	Série A	15	0	7	0	5	0	9	1	—		36	1
São Paulo	Total		43	0	14	1	10	0	15	1	—		82	2
Career total			494	17	102	4	38	1	102	7	7	1	743	30

=== International ===
Appearances and goals by national team and year
National team	Year	Apps	Goals
Brazil	2009	6	0
Brazil	2013	1	0
Brazil	2014	6	0
Brazil	2015	14	0
Brazil	2016	10	1
Brazil	2017	6	0
Brazil	2018	11	2
Brazil	2019	4	0
Total		58	3

Scores and results list Brazil's goal tally first, score column indicates score after each Miranda goal.

List of international goals scored by Miranda
No.	Date	Venue	Opponent	Score	Result	Competition
1	6 September 2016	Arena da Amazônia, Manaus, Brazil	Colombia	1–0	2–1	2018 FIFA World Cup qualification
2	23 March 2018	Luzhniki Stadium, Moscow, Russia	Russia	1–0	3–0	Friendly
3	16 October 2018	King Abdullah Sports City, Jeddah, Saudi Arabia	Argentina	1–0	1–0	2018 Superclásico de las Américas

== Honours ==
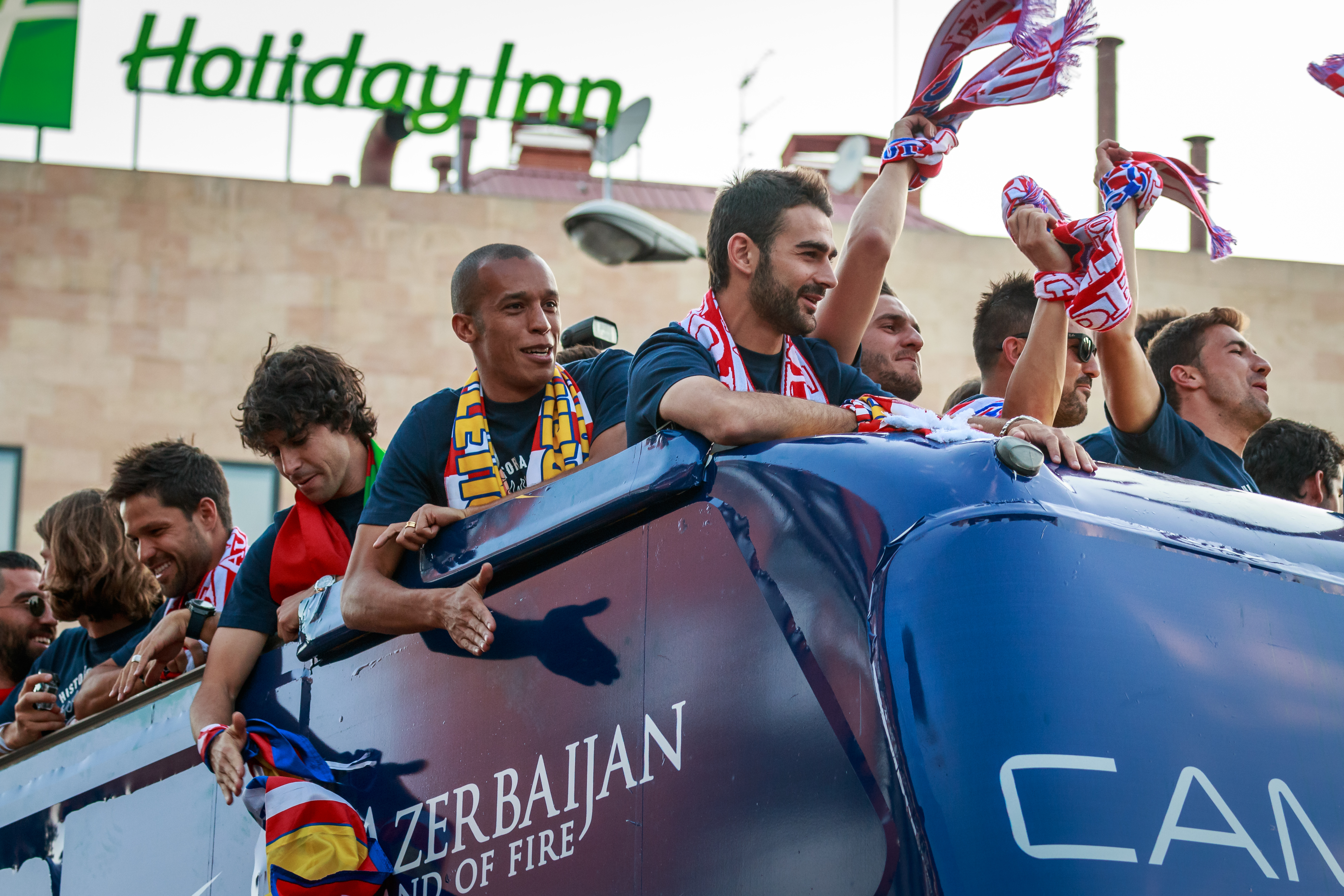
Miranda on Atlético Madrid's victory parade after winning the league in 2014

São Paulo

- Série A: 2006, 2007, 2008
- Campeonato Paulista: 2021
- Copa Sudamericana runner-up: 2022

Atlético Madrid

- La Liga: 2013–14
- Copa del Rey: 2012–13
- Supercopa de España: 2014
- UEFA Europa League: 2011–12
- UEFA Super Cup: 2012
- UEFA Champions League runner-up: 2013–14

Jiangsu Suning

- Chinese Super League: 2020

Brazil

- FIFA Confederations Cup: 2009
- Copa América: 2019

Individual

- Campeonato Brasileiro Série A Team of the Year: 2007, 2008, 2009, 2010
- Bola de Prata: 2008, 2009

== See also ==
- List of Atlético Madrid players
