= Juan Carlos Díaz (footballer, born 1977) =

Argentine footballer

Personal information
- Full name: Juan Carlos Díaz
- Date of birth: 21 June 1977 (age 49)
- Place of birth: San Fernando, Catamarca, Argentina
- Height: 1.84 m (6 ft 0 in)
- Position: Midfielder

Youth career
- 1982–1993: Juventud Unida SR
- Rosario Central

Senior career*
Years	Team	Apps	(Gls)
1998	Almirante Brown Arrecifes		
1999	Central Córdoba		
1999–2002	Tiro Federal	11	(0)
2003–2004	All Boys	13	(0)
2004–2005	Argentino de Rosario	27	(2)
2005–2006	General Paz Juniors	23	(4)
2006–2008	Gimnasia CdU	55	(9)
2008	Coquimbo Unido	20	(1)
2009	Huracán TA		
2009–2010	Unión La Calera	16	(0)
2011	General Paz Juniors		
2011–2012	Huracán TA		
- * Club domestic league appearances and goals

Juan Carlos Díaz (born 21 June 1977) is an Argentine former footballer who played as a midfielder. He played in his homeland and Chile.

== Club career ==
A left-footed midfielder born in San Fernando, Catamarca, Argentina, Díaz developed the most part of his career in his homeland. He was trained at Juventud Unida de Santa Rosa and Rosario Central. He played for Almirante Brown de Arrecifes, Central Córdoba de Rosario, Tiro Federal, All Boys, Argentino de Rosario, General Paz Juniors and Gimnasia y Esgrima de Concepción del Uruguay between 1998 and 2008.

In the second half of 2008, Díaz moved to Chile and joined Coquimbo Unido along with his countrymen Marcos Bustos and Jonathan Jacquet. The next year, he returned to Argentina with Huracán de Tres Arroyos.

In the second half of 2009, Díaz returned to Chile with Unión La Calera.

Back to Argentina, he ended his career with General Paz Juniors and Huracán de Tres Arroyos.

== Personal life ==
Juan Carlos is the older brother of Argentina international footballer Daniel Cata Díaz.
