= Koke (footballer, born 1992) =

Spanish footballer

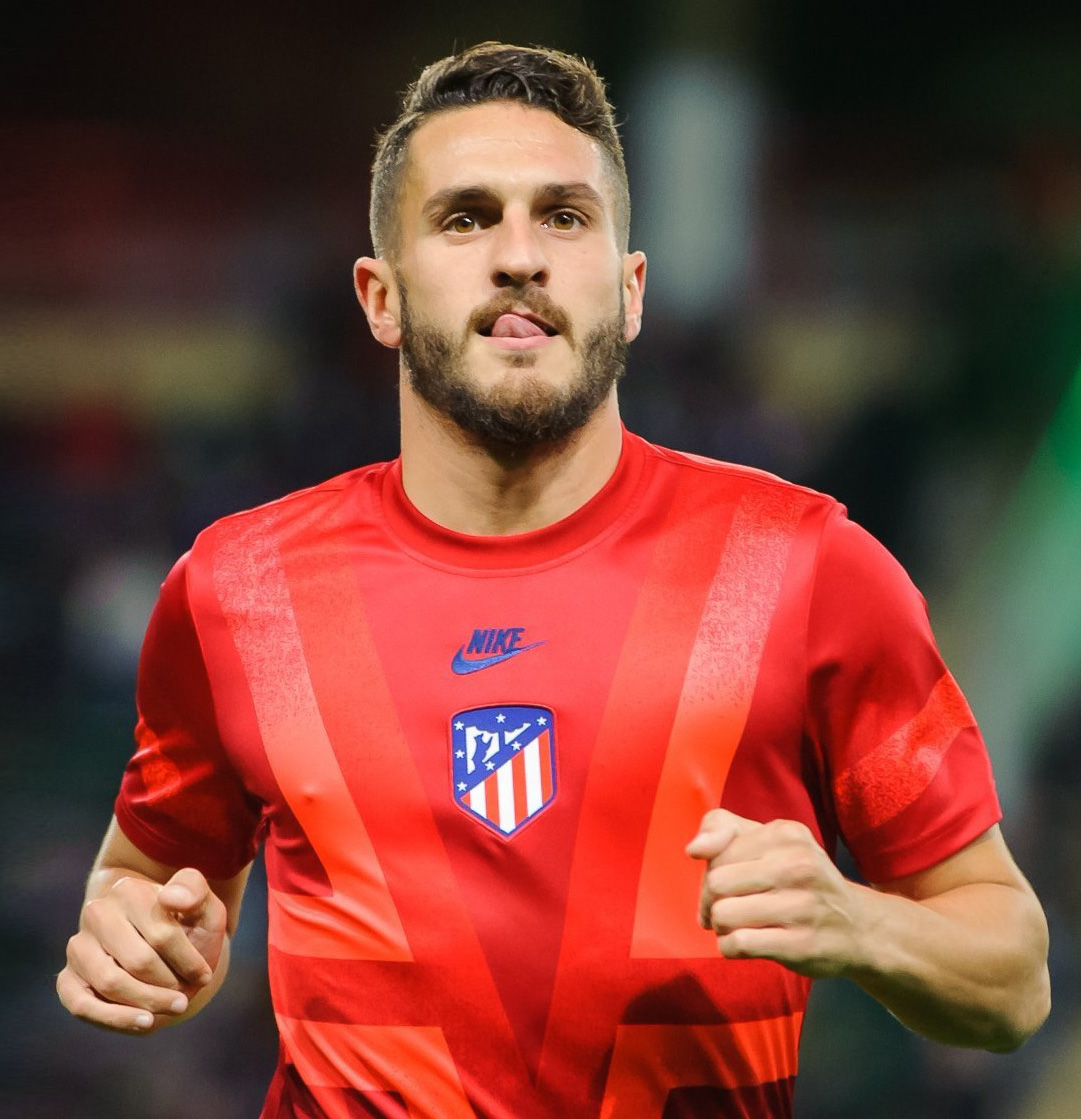
- Koke with Atlético Madrid in 2019

Personal information
- Full name: Jorge Resurrección Merodio
- Date of birth: 8 January 1992 (age 34)
- Place of birth: Madrid, Spain
- Height: 1.76 m (5 ft 9 in)
- Position: Midfielder

Team information
- Current team: Atlético Madrid
- Number: 6

Youth career
- 2000–2008: Atlético Madrid

Senior career*
Years	Team	Apps	(Gls)
2008–2010	Atlético Madrid B	66	(7)
2009–	Atlético Madrid	529	(40)

International career
2007	Spain U15	1	(0)
2008	Spain U16	3	(0)
2008–2009	Spain U17	19	(0)
2010–2011	Spain U19	9	(0)
2011	Spain U20	5	(1)
2011–2013	Spain U21	12	(1)
2012	Spain U23	6	(1)
2013–2022	Spain	70	(0)
Medal record
Men's football
Representing Spain
UEFA European Championship
Bronze medal – third place	2020 Europe
UEFA Nations League
Runner-up	2021 Italy
FIFA U-17 World Cup
Third place	2009 Nigeria	Team
UEFA European Under-21 Championship
Winner	2013 Israel	Team
UEFA European Under-19 Championship
Runner-up	2010 France	Team
- * Club domestic league appearances and goals as of 17:11, 22 November 2026 (UTC)

Jorge Resurrección Merodio (Spanish pronunciation: [ˈxorxe resureɣˈθjom meˈɾoðjo]; (Note: In isolation, Resurrección is pronounced [resureɣˈθjon].) born 8 January 1992), known as Koke ([ˈkoke]), is a Spanish professional footballer who plays as a midfielder for and captains La Liga club Atlético Madrid.

He has spent the entirety of his career with Atlético Madrid since making his debut with the first team in 2009, playing a club record of over 700 competitive matches and winning the 2013–14 and 2020–21 La Liga, two Europa League titles and two UEFA Super Cup trophies, while he was also a Champions League runner-up in 2014 and 2016.

Koke won the 2013 European Championship with the Spain under-21 team. He also made his debut for the full side that year, and represented the country at three World Cups and two European Championships.

== Club career ==
=== Debut ===
Koke was born in Madrid. Having arrived at Atlético Madrid's youth system at the age of eight, he made his debut for the first team on 19 September 2009, playing the second half of a 5–2 away loss against FC Barcelona after coming on as a substitute for Paulo Assunção. He made three further appearances during the season.

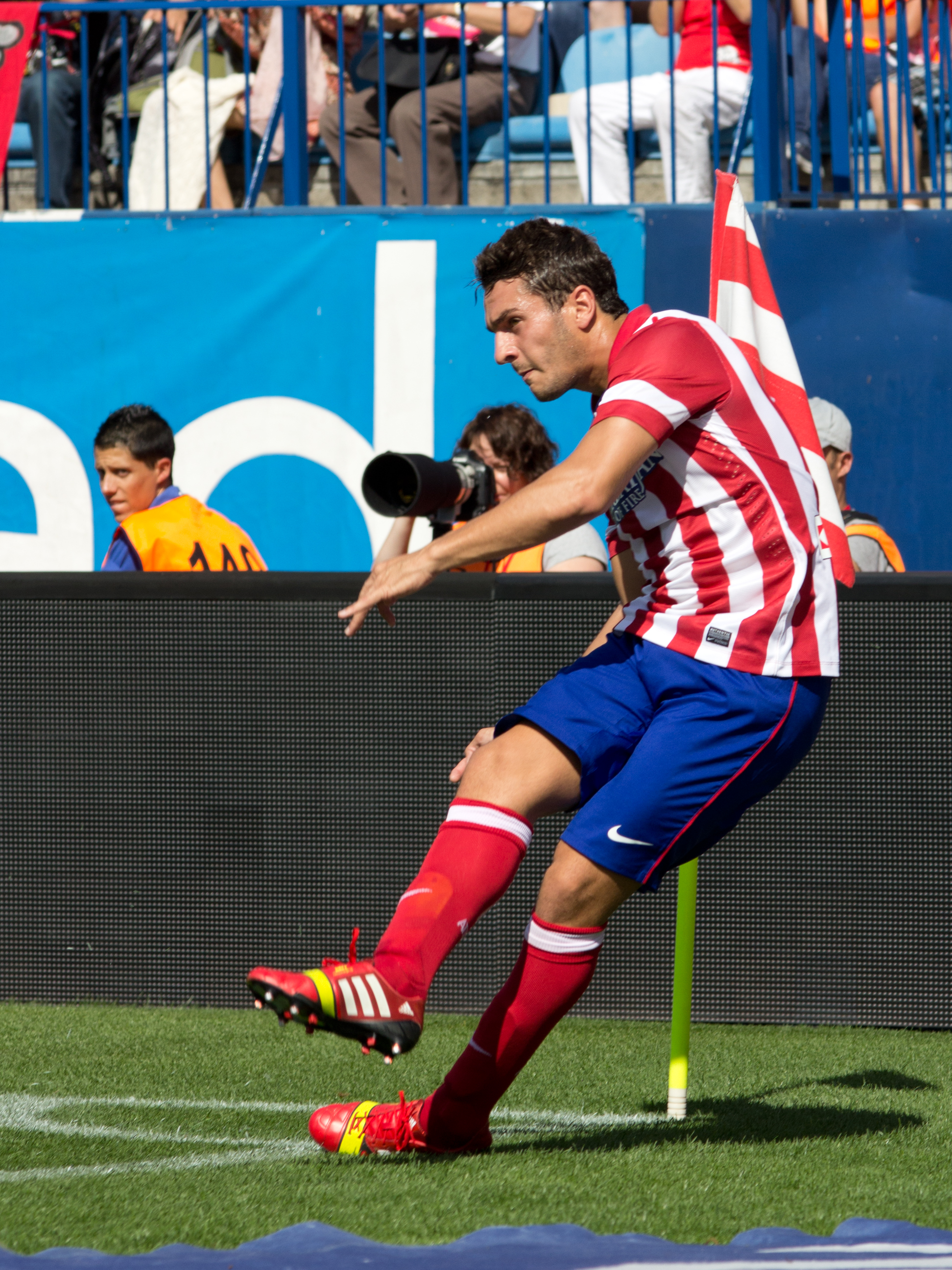
Koke taking a corner for Atlético in 2013

Koke scored his first league goal against Sevilla FC on 26 February 2011, his 47th-minute header from a Diego Forlán cross making it 1–1 in an eventual 2–2 home draw. He finished his first full season as a professional with 17 games in 841 minutes and two goals (the other coming in a 2–2 draw at RCD Espanyol), as the Colchoneros finished seventh and qualified for the UEFA Europa League.

Koke was again an important member of Atlético's midfield in 2011–12, under both Gregorio Manzano and his successor Diego Simeone. He scored his first league goal of the campaign on 29 April 2012, opening the 2–2 away draw against Real Betis in the 62nd minute. He appeared in 13 matches during the club's successful Europa League run, including a 90th-minute substitute appearance in a 3–0 defeat of Athletic Bilbao in the final.

=== Consolidation ===
Aged only 20, Koke started in 38 of his 48 official appearances during 2012–13 and scored three goals – this included 112 minutes in the final of the Copa del Rey, won against Real Madrid at the Santiago Bernabéu. He also began to excel at passing, either through set pieces or open play.

On 1 September 2013, Koke scored his first goal of the new season, contributing to a 2–1 away win over Real Sociedad; his performances in October earned him the accolade of La Liga Player of the Month, while Simeone won the equivalent managerial award. On 3 March 2014, he scored to help his side to a 2–2 home draw in the Madrid derby against Real Madrid.

On 9 April 2014, Koke scored his first goal in the UEFA Champions League, the only in the quarter-final tie against Barcelona to send Atlético to the semi-finals for the first time since 1974. He finished the domestic league season as the player with the second most assists with 14, as they won the league title for the first time in 18 years after drawing 1–1 with Barcelona at the Camp Nou in the final round; he was a nominee at the La Liga Awards at attacking midfielder, losing out to Andrés Iniesta, and signed a new five-year contract in June.

Koke was named player of the match in Atlético's Champions League group fixture at Malmö FF on 4 November 2014, scoring the first goal of a 2–0 win. In a penalty shootout against Bayer 04 Leverkusen in the round of 16, on 18 March of the following year, he had his attempt saved by Bernd Leno, but his team nonetheless advanced.

Koke started 2015–16 slowly, scoring one goal and registering not a single assist by November. In mid-April 2016, after six decisive passes in as many matches, he equalled his record of 12; he surpassed that tally later that month, also moving to first place in the assists chart ahead of Barcelona's Luis Suárez, and was voted Player of the Month for the second time.

On 23 October 2016, Koke was sent off for the first time in his career, for two yellow cards in a 1–0 loss at Sevilla. In May 2017, he agreed to a new five-year deal until 2024. Two months after turning 26, he entered the top 10 appearance makers in Atlético history with his 361st against Deportivo de La Coruña on 1 April 2018.

=== Milestones ===
On 20 January 2019, Koke played his 400th official match for the club on 20 January 2019 – becoming the youngest player to do so in the process at the age of 27 – scoring once and providing one assist in a 3–0 away defeat against SD Huesca. Following Diego Godín's departure in the summer, he became captain.

On 23 June 2020, Koke played his 450th game in a 1–0 away victory against Levante UD, being the youngest to reach that figure for the organisation. The following 12 May, as his side neared the league title, he made his 500th appearance in a 2–1 home victory against Real Sociedad, a feat only done before by Adelardo Rodríguez; he broke the former's record on 1 October 2022 in his 554th, a 2–0 victory against Sevilla.

On 12 February 2023, Koke appeared in his 402nd match in the top division, again surpassing Adelardo, in a 1–0 away defeat of RC Celta de Vigo. In March 2024, he signed a new contract until June 2025.

Koke featured in his 100th Champions League match on 26 November 2024, in a 6–0 victory at AC Sparta Prague. On 2 June 2025, the 33-year-old renewed his link until 2026; he agreed to another extension in July 2026.

== International career ==
=== Youth ===
Koke was a member of the Spain under-20s who reached the quarter-finals at the 2011 FIFA World Cup in Colombia. He missed in the last-16 penalty shootout against South Korea, but his side advanced nonetheless.

Koke was selected for the 2012 Summer Olympics in London, playing all three matches in a group-stage exit. He also represented the under-21s at the 2013 UEFA European Championship, being named to the team of the tournament as the nation won the competition by beating Italy 4–2 in Jerusalem in the final.

=== Senior ===
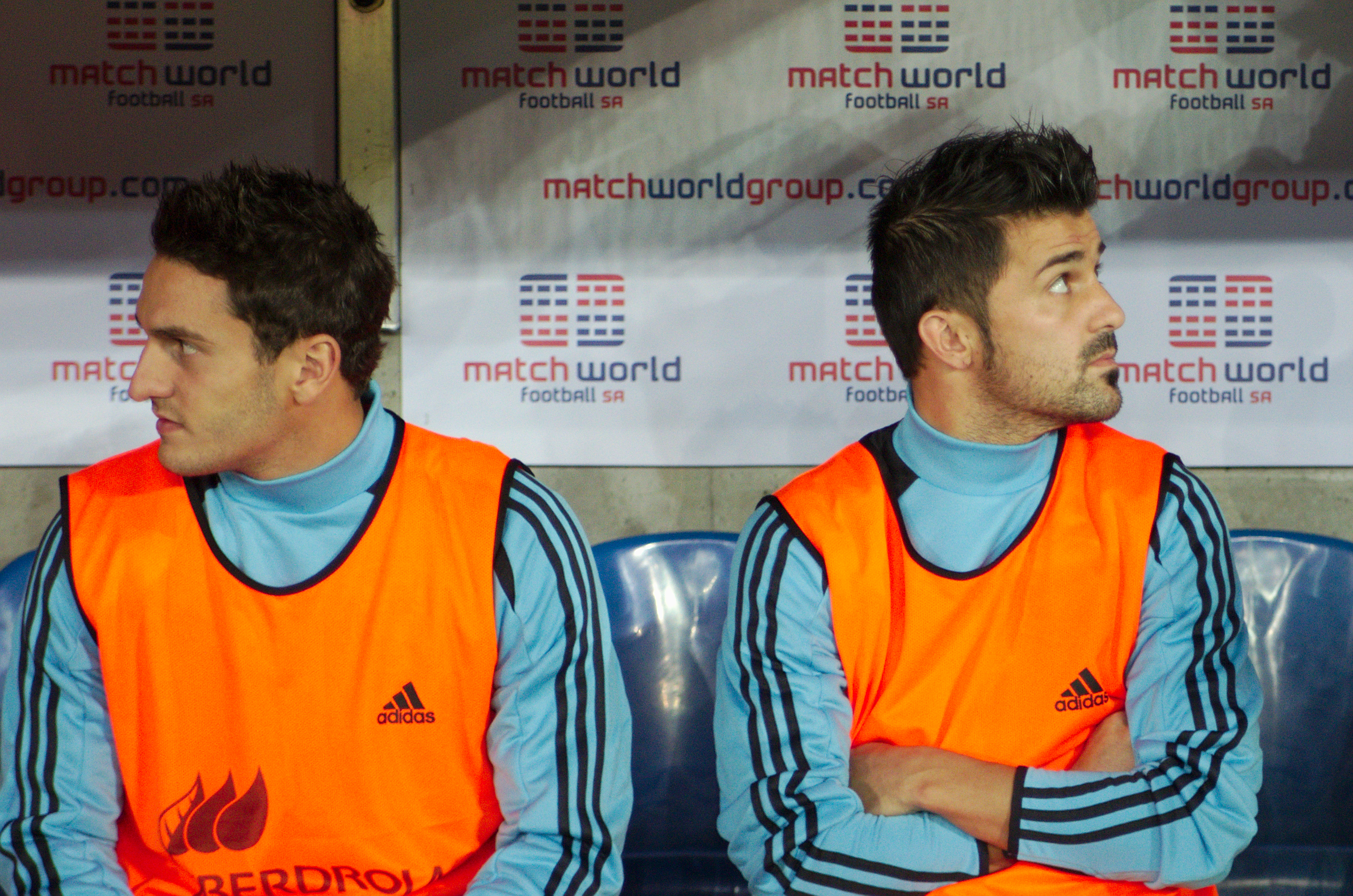
Koke (left) on the bench with Atlético teammate David Villa, in a friendly with Chile in 2013

On 14 August 2013, Koke made his senior debut, replacing Santi Cazorla for the final 12 minutes of a 2–0 friendly victory against Ecuador. His first competitive appearance for La Furia Roja came the same year on 6 September, as he started and finished a 2014 FIFA World Cup qualifier against Finland that ended with a 2–0 victory.

Koke was named in Spain's 30-man provisional squad for the 2014 World Cup and was also included in the final one. On 19 June, he made his debut in the tournament after replacing Xabi Alonso at half-time as the champions lost 2–0 to Chile at the Maracanã in the second group game and elimination was eventually confirmed. He started in the final fixture, a 3–0 victory over Australia.

Koke was also selected by manager Julen Lopetegui for the 2018 World Cup in Russia. On 1 July, he was one of two Spanish players to miss his attempt in the Round Of 16 shootout against the hosts, a 4–3 loss in Moscow.

After two years without a cap, Koke returned to international duty on 11 November 2020 in a 1–1 friendly draw away to the Netherlands, in which he captained the country for the first time. The following May, he was included in the 24-man squad for Euro 2020.

== Style of play ==
Koke is right-footed, but his versatility allows him to play as right, left or central midfielder. He is also known for his passing and ability to create attacking opportunities.

Koke earned the plaudits of his peers, including former Barcelona footballer Xavi who regarded him as his successor: "He has everything: talent, physical ability, he is a footballer of the present and the future... He has been marked out as the conductor of Spain's orchestra for the next 10 years. I have a special affection for him because we play in the same position and I think he is an extraordinary player."

== Career statistics ==
=== Club ===
As of match played 22 November 2026

Appearances and goals by club, season and competition
Club	Season	League			Copa del Rey		Europe		Other		Total	
Club	Season	Division	Apps	Goals	Apps	Goals	Apps	Goals	Apps	Goals	Apps	Goals
Atlético Madrid B	2008–09	Segunda División B	28	3	—		—		—		28	3
Atlético Madrid B	2009–10	Segunda División B	25	2	—		—		—		25	2
Atlético Madrid B	2010–11	Segunda División B	13	2	—		—		—		13	2
Atlético Madrid B	Total		66	7	—		—		—		66	7
Atlético Madrid	2009–10	La Liga	4	0	0	0	0	0	—		4	0
Atlético Madrid	2010–11	La Liga	17	2	2	0	0	0	—		19	2
Atlético Madrid	2011–12	La Liga	25	2	2	0	13 (Note: Appearances in UEFA Europa League)	0	—		40	2
Atlético Madrid	2012–13	La Liga	33	3	7	0	7	0	1 (Note: Appearance in UEFA Super Cup)	0	48	3
Atlético Madrid	2013–14	La Liga	36	6	7	0	13 (Note: Appearances in UEFA Champions League)	1	2 (Note: Appearances in Supercopa de España)	0	58	7
Atlético Madrid	2014–15	La Liga	34	2	4	0	9	2	2	0	49	4
Atlético Madrid	2015–16	La Liga	35	5	5	0	11	0	—		51	5
Atlético Madrid	2016–17	La Liga	36	4	6	1	12	0	—		54	5
Atlético Madrid	2017–18	La Liga	35	4	3	0	13 (Note: Four appearances and two goals in UEFA Champions League, nine appearances and two goals in UEFA Europa League)	2	—		51	6
Atlético Madrid	2018–19	La Liga	30	3	3	0	7	2	1	1	41	6
Atlético Madrid	2019–20	La Liga	32	4	0	0	9	0	1	1	42	5
Atlético Madrid	2020–21	La Liga	37	1	0	0	8	0	—		45	1
Atlético Madrid	2021–22	La Liga	31	1	2	0	9	0	1	0	43	1
Atlético Madrid	2022–23	La Liga	33	0	5	0	4	0	—		42	0
Atlético Madrid	2023–24	La Liga	35	0	5	0	9	0	1	0	50	0
Atlético Madrid	2024–25	La Liga	32	1	5	0	7	0	3 (Note: Appearances in FIFA Club World Cup)	0	47	1
Atlético Madrid	2025–26	La Liga	34	2	5	0	16	0	1	0	56	2
Atlético Madrid	2026–27	La Liga	10	0	0	0	2	0	0	0	12	0
Atlético Madrid	Total		529	40	61	1	149	7	13	2	752	50
Career total			595	47	61	1	149	7	13	2	818	57

=== International ===
Appearances and goals by national team and year
National team	Year	Apps	Goals
Spain	2013	7	0
Spain	2014	8	0
Spain	2015	5	0
Spain	2016	10	0
Spain	2017	6	0
Spain	2018	8	0
Spain	2019	0	0
Spain	2020	3	0
Spain	2021	14	0
Spain	2022	9	0
Total		70	0

== Honours ==
Atlético Madrid

- La Liga: 2013–14, 2020–21
- Copa del Rey: 2012–13; runner-up: 2025–26
- Supercopa de España: 2014
- UEFA Europa League: 2011–12, 2017–18
- UEFA Super Cup: 2012, 2018
- UEFA Champions League runner-up: 2013–14, 2015–16

Spain U17

- FIFA U-17 World Cup third place: 2009

Spain U19

- UEFA European Under-19 Championship runner-up: 2010

Spain U21

- UEFA European Under-21 Championship: 2013

Spain

- UEFA Nations League runner-up: 2020–21

Individual

- La Liga Squad of the Season: 2013–14
- La Liga Player of the Month: October 2013, April 2016
- UEFA Champions League Squad of the Season: 2015–16
- UEFA Europa League Squad of the Season: 2017–18
- UEFA European Under-21 Championship Team of the Tournament: 2013

== See also ==
- List of Atlético Madrid players
- List of footballers with 400 or more La Liga appearances
- List of one-club men in association football
