= 2012 UEFA Super Cup =

- Match programme cover
Chelsea	Atlético Madrid
(England)	(Spain)
1	4
- Date: 31 August 2012
- Venue: Stade Louis II, Monaco
- Man of the Match: Radamel Falcao (Atlético Madrid)
- Referee: Damir Skomina (Slovenia)
- Attendance: 14,312
- Weather: Cloudy night 19 °C (66 °F); 60% humidity

The 2012 UEFA Super Cup was the 37th UEFA Super Cup, an annual football match organised by UEFA and contested by the reigning champions of the two main European club competitions, the UEFA Champions League and the UEFA Europa League. It was played at the Stade Louis II in Monaco on 31 August 2012, between the 2011–12 UEFA Champions League winners Chelsea of England and the 2011–12 UEFA Europa League winners Atlético Madrid of Spain.

This was the last Super Cup to be played at the Stade Louis II, which had hosted the match since 1998, as future editions began to be hosted at different venues, starting with the 2013 edition, which was played at Eden Arena in Prague.

Atlético Madrid won 4–1 to claim their second UEFA Super Cup. Radamel Falcao scored a first-half hat-trick and Miranda added a fourth for Atlético on the hour mark, before Gary Cahill scored a consolation goal for Chelsea in the 75th minute.

== Venue ==
The Stade Louis II in Monaco was the venue for the UEFA Super Cup every year since 1998. Built in 1985, the stadium is also the home of Monaco, who play in the French league system.

The net capacity of the Stade Louis II was 18,000. Over 70 percent of the tickets were reserved for the general public and supporters of the two clubs. Chelsea and Atlético distributed their tickets directly to their fans. The ticket category available for the general public was Category 1 (Première) opposite the main stand at a price of €70. The international general public ticket sales process began, exclusively via UEFA.com, on 15 June and ended on 2 July.

== Teams ==
Team	Qualification	Previous participation (bold indicates winners)
(England) Chelsea	2011–12 UEFA Champions League winners	**1998**
(Spain) Atlético Madrid	2011–12 UEFA Europa League winners	**2010**

There had previously been four English-Spanish encounters in the UEFA Super Cup (1979, 1980, 1982, 1998), with English teams winning three out of four.

== Match ==
=== Details ===
31 August 2012
20:45 CEST

Chelsea (England)	1–4	(Spain) Atlético Madrid
Cahill 75'	Report	Falcao 6', 19', 45'; Miranda 60'

Stade Louis II, Monaco
Attendance: 14,312
Referee: Damir Skomina (Slovenia)

**Chelsea**	**Atlético Madrid**

GK	1	(Czech Republic) Petr Čech
RB	2	(Serbia) Branislav Ivanović	(yellow card) 29'
CB	24	(England) Gary Cahill
CB	4	(Brazil) David Luiz
LB	3	(England) Ashley Cole		(substituted off) 90'
CM	12	(Nigeria) Mikel John Obi
CM	8	(England) Frank Lampard (c)
RW	7	(Brazil) Ramires		(substituted off) 46'
AM	17	(Belgium) Eden Hazard
LW	10	(Spain) Juan Mata		(substituted off) 81'
CF	9	(Spain) Fernando Torres
Substitutes:
GK	22	(England) Ross Turnbull
DF	34	(England) Ryan Bertrand		(substituted on) 90'
MF	6	(Spain) Oriol Romeu
MF	11	(Brazil) Oscar		(substituted on) 46'
MF	16	(Portugal) Raul Meireles
FW	23	(England) Daniel Sturridge		(substituted on) 81'
FW	13	(Nigeria) Victor Moses
Manager:
(Italy) Roberto Di Matteo

GK	13	(Belgium) Thibaut Courtois
RB	20	(Spain) Juanfran
CB	23	(Brazil) Miranda
CB	2	(Uruguay) Diego Godín
LB	3	(Brazil) Filipe Luís
DM	4	(Spain) Mario Suárez
DM	14	(Spain) Gabi (c)
RW	7	(Spain) Adrián	(substituted off) 56'
AM	6	(Spain) Koke	(substituted off) 81'
LW	10	(Turkey) Arda Turan
CF	9	(Colombia) Radamel Falcao	(substituted off) 87'
Substitutes:
GK	25	(Spain) Sergio Asenjo
DF	17	(Portugal) Sílvio
DF	18	(Argentina) Cata Díaz
MF	8	(Spain) Raúl García	(substituted on) 81'
MF	21	(Turkey) Emre Belözoğlu	(substituted on) 87'
MF	11	(Uruguay) Cristian Rodríguez	(substituted on) 56'
FW	19	(Brazil) Diego Costa
Manager:
(Argentina) Diego Simeone

Man of the Match:
Radamel Falcao (Atlético Madrid)

Assistant referees:
Primož Arhar (Slovenia)
Matej Žunič (Slovenia)
Fourth official:
Bojan Ul (Slovenia)
Additional assistant referees:
Matej Jug (Slovenia)
Slavko Vinčić (Slovenia)

**Match rules**

- 90 minutes
- 30 minutes of extra time if necessary
- Penalty shoot-out if scores still level
- Seven named substitutes, of which up to three may be used

=== Statistics ===
First half
Statistic	Chelsea	Atlético Madrid
Goals scored	0	3
Total shots	5	11
Shots on target	4	7
Saves	4	4
Ball possession	58%	42%
Corner kicks	1	1
Fouls committed	5	9
Offsides	1	2
Yellow cards	1	0
Red cards	0	0

Second half
Statistic	Chelsea	Atlético Madrid
Goals scored	1	1
Total shots	7	7
Shots on target	3	5
Saves	4	2
Ball possession	56%	44%
Corner kicks	2	5
Fouls committed	8	9
Offsides	0	0
Yellow cards	0	0
Red cards	0	0

Overall
Statistic	Chelsea	Atlético Madrid
Goals scored	1	4
Total shots	12	18
Shots on target	7	12
Saves	8	6
Ball possession	57%	43%
Corner kicks	3	6
Fouls committed	13	18
Offsides	1	2
Yellow cards	1	0
Red cards	0	0

== See also ==
- 2012–13 UEFA Champions League
- 2012–13 UEFA Europa League
- 2012–13 Atlético Madrid season
- 2012–13 Chelsea F.C. season
- Atlético Madrid in European football
- Chelsea F.C. in international football
