= Diego Godín =

Uruguayan footballer (born 1986)

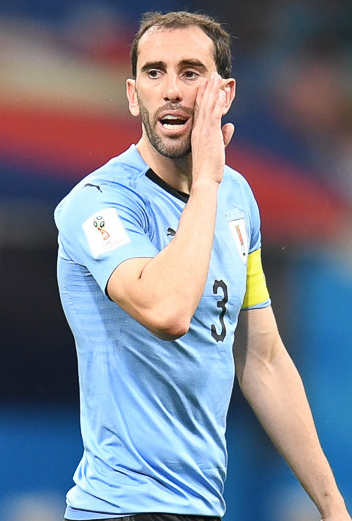
- Godín with Uruguay at the 2018 FIFA World Cup

Personal information
- Full name: Diego Roberto Godín Leal
- Date of birth: 16 February 1986 (age 40)
- Place of birth: Rosario, Uruguay
- Height: 1.87 m (6 ft 2 in)
- Position: Centre-back

Youth career
- Estudiantes El Colla
- 2000–2003: Defensor

Senior career*
Years	Team	Apps	(Gls)
2003–2006	Cerro	63	(6)
2006–2007	Nacional	26	(0)
2007–2010	Villarreal	91	(4)
2010–2019	Atlético Madrid	277	(17)
2019–2020	Inter Milan	23	(1)
2020–2022	Cagliari	39	(1)
2022	Atlético Mineiro	5	(1)
2022–2023	Vélez Sarsfield	19	(1)
2024	Porongos (es)	14	(0)
Total		557	(31)

International career
2004–2005	Uruguay U20	14	(0)
2005–2022	Uruguay	161	(8)
Medal record
Representing Uruguay
Copa América
Winner	2011
- * Club domestic league appearances and goals

Diego Roberto Godín Leal (born 16 February 1986) is a Uruguayan former professional footballer who played as a centre-back.

Regarded as one of the best defenders of his generation, he started out at Cerro and three years later was transferred to Primera División side Nacional. He then spent the majority of his career in Spain, representing Villarreal and Atlético Madrid and winning eight titles with the latter club, including the La Liga championship in the 2013–14 season. He also played in Italy with Inter Milan and Cagliari, in Brazil with Atlético Mineiro and in Argentina with Vélez Sarsfield, retiring in 2023.

A Uruguay international from 2005 to 2022, Godín is the country's all-time most-capped player. He represented the national side at four World Cups and six Copa América tournaments, winning the 2011 edition of the latter competition.

== Early life ==
Godín was born in Rosario to Julio Godín and Iris Leal. Aged 4, during a family gathering, he nearly drowned after trying to catch fish in a river, but eventually swam to shore without the help of anybody.

== Club career ==
=== Uruguay and Villarreal ===
Godín started his professional career with Cerro at the age of 17. After his good performances, he was transferred to Primera División powerhouse Nacional, where he quickly became captain due to his maturity and professionalism.

In August 2007, Godín signed a five-year deal with La Liga side Villarreal, scoring in just his second game, a 3–2 away loss against Osasuna on 7 October, and participating in 24 matches in their best league placement ever (second). He consolidated his starting position in the subsequent seasons, mostly partnering Argentine Gonzalo Rodríguez in the heart of the back four.

=== Atlético Madrid ===
On 4 August 2010, after experiencing his best season at Villarreal – 36 games, three goals – Godín joined Atlético Madrid on a five-year contract, after the two clubs agreed an initial fee believed to be around €8 million or £6.6 million. He made his official debut for the Colchoneros on the 27th, playing the entire 2–0 win against Inter Milan in the UEFA Super Cup.

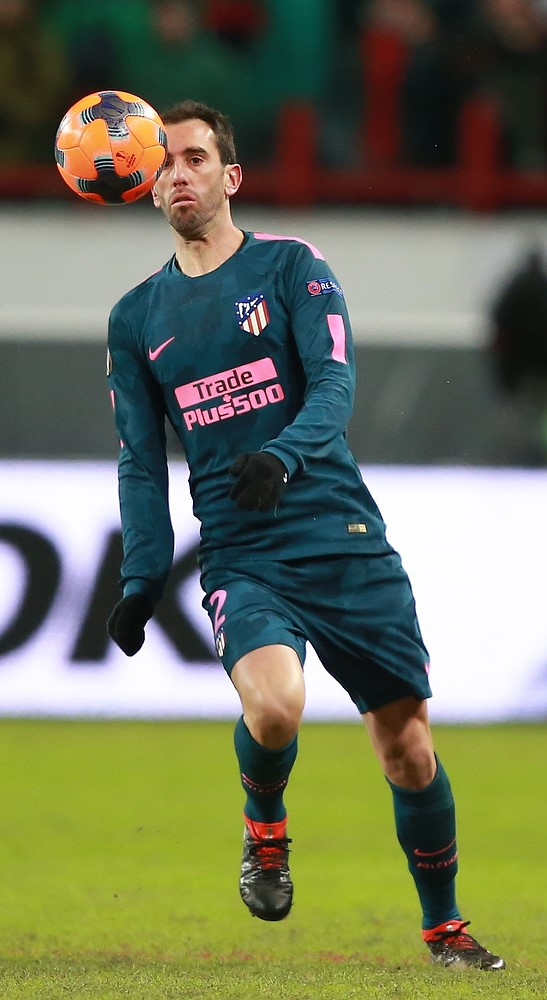
Godín in action for Atlético in 2018

Godín signed a new contract with Atlético on 1 November 2013, keeping him at the club until 2018. He scored four league goals during the campaign, including one on the last matchday on 17 May 2014 against Barcelona which equalised the game at 1–1 to earn his team its first league title in 18 years. A week later, again through a header, he repeated the feat in the final of the UEFA Champions League to put his team ahead, but Real Madrid eventually won 4–1.

In 2015, Godín rejected a transfer to Manchester City, managed by his former Villarreal boss Manuel Pellegrini. On 28 October 2017 he became the foreign player with most appearances for the club, surpassing fellow stopper Luis Perea after his 315th against Villarreal; he was nominated for the 2016 and 2018 Ballon d'Or awards.

On 20 February 2019, Godín scored the second goal in 2–0 home victory over Juventus in the Champions League round of 16. On 7 May, the 33-year-old announced he would be departing the Metropolitano Stadium after a nine-year tenure and, on 1 June, he symbolically handed over the captain armband to Koke in the 1–1 draw against Sevilla.

=== Inter Milan ===
On 1 July 2019, Inter Milan announced they had signed Godín for free on a three-year deal. It was reported that he had already agreed to a pre-contract the previous January. He made his debut in Serie A on 1 September, coming on for Antonio Candreva for the final 11 minutes of a 2–1 win at Cagliari.

In a season in which Inter finished one point behind champions Juventus, Godín scored his first Nerazzurri goal on 13 July 2020 in a 3–1 home victory over Torino. On 21 August he equalised against Sevilla in the 2020 UEFA Europa League Final in Cologne, a 3–2 loss for his side; only five other men had scored in the finals of European football's two top tournaments.

=== Cagliari ===
On 24 September 2020, Godín joined Cagliari on a three-year contract. He played his first match for them on 4 October, in a 5–2 away defeat to Atalanta where he also scored.

Godín left on 12 January 2022 by mutual agreement.

=== Atlético Mineiro ===
On 12 January 2022, the 36-year-old Godín agreed to a one-year deal with Atlético Mineiro. He scored on his debut on 6 February, a 3–0 win over Patrocinense in the Campeonato Mineiro. On 20 February, he started in the 2022 Supercopa do Brasil which Atlético won after beating Flamengo in a penalty shootout.

In April 2022, Godín said that one of the reasons for which he had returned to South American football was to play the Copa Libertadores, his return marking the first time he appeared in the tournament after a 15-year hiatus. On 20 June, after failing to break into the starting team and aiming to play at the upcoming World Cup for Uruguay, he announced his departure in mutual terms.

=== Vélez Sarsfield ===
On 21 June 2022, Godín joined Vélez Sarsfield on a one-and-a-half-year contract. He announced his retirement on 27 July 2023, playing his last match when his team visited Huracán on the last round of the season.

=== Later career ===
Godín came out of retirement in February 2024, signing for Uruguayan amateurs Porongos. In September, after winning the Copa Nacional de Clubes, he hung up his boots for the second and final time.

== International career ==
In 2005, at the age of 19, Godín made his debut for Uruguay in a friendly defeat against Mexico in Guadalajara. His first international goal came in another exhibition game, with Serbia and Montenegro in May 2006. He represented the nation at the 2007 Copa América, playing in the opening 0–3 defeat to Peru before losing his place to Andrés Scotti in Uruguay's run to fourth place.

Godín was selected for the squad at the 2010 FIFA World Cup in South Africa. He started in the opening match against France (0–0) in Cape Town, and played in a further four matches for the eventual semi-finalists.

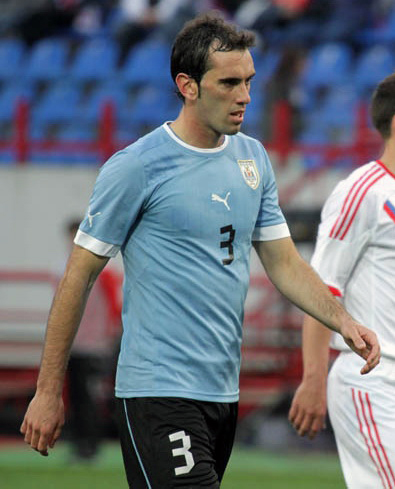
Godín playing for Uruguay in 2010

In 2011, Godín featured in Uruguay's successful 2011 Copa América campaign, making one appearance as a late substitute in a 3–0 defeat of Paraguay in the final after being bedridden for several days with a virus. He also participated in the 2013 FIFA Confederations Cup, partnering Diego Lugano in defence in four of the team's five matches as they reached the semi-finals.

Godín was selected by coach Óscar Tabárez for the 2014 World Cup and captained the team in three of their four games due to Lugano's absence through injury. On 24 June, he headed the only goal against Italy in the final group fixture, sending the country through to the knockout stage.

In May 2015, Godín was named as captain for Uruguay's defence of the Copa América during the 2015 continental tournament in Chile. He was also picked for the Copa América Centenario squad, heading home from a Carlos Sánchez long cross in the opener against Mexico where both teams ended with ten players (3–1 loss). He won his 100th cap in the following match, a 1–0 defeat to Venezuela at the Lincoln Financial Field.

Godín was also selected for the 2018 World Cup. The following 25 March, at the 2019 China Cup, he made his 126th appearance against Thailand, surpassing Maxi Pereira as the most capped player in the national team's history.

In June 2019, Godín skippered the team to the quarter-finals of the Copa América in Brazil. He repeated the feat two years later, in the same country. He played the full 90 minutes of his 150th cap on 10 October 2021, a 3–0 loss away to Argentina in 2022 World Cup qualification.

== Style of play ==
Despite his lack of pace or significant athleticism, Godín was regarded by pundits as one of the best and most consistent defenders in the world, and as one of the leading centre-backs of his generation. During the 2018 World Cup, Jack Watson of The Independent described him as "the best central defender in the world."

An intelligent centre-back, Godín was mainly known for his leadership, positioning and calm composure, which allowed him to organise his back-line, read the game and anticipate plays. Aggressive, competitive and physical, he was also known for his aerial ability and his capacity to time his jumps effectively, which enabled him to defend high balls, score goals with his head on set pieces, and beat out larger players to the ball in the air.

Godín also stood out for his capacity to time his challenges, make blocks, interceptions and win the ball. Moreover, he was strong in one–on-one situations as his defensive positioning often allowed opposition players little time or space on the ball. In addition to his defensive skills, he was also known for his technique, ball–playing ability and capacity to carry the ball out from the defence, which allowed him to start plays from the back and create chances for teammates.

== Personal life ==
Godín married Sofia, daughter of José Herrera, a Uruguayan international who played in Serie A for Cagliari alongside compatriot Enzo Francescoli. He is close friends with Antoine Griezmann, who played with him at Atlético Madrid. During the 2018 World Cup quarter-finals match against France, the latter did not celebrate his goal out of respect for the former and also club teammate José María Giménez; Godín is also godfather to Griezmann's daughter.

== Career statistics ==
=== Club ===
Appearances and goals by club, season and competition
Club	Season	League			National cup		Continental		Other		Total	
Club	Season	Division	Apps	Goals	Apps	Goals	Apps	Goals	Apps	Goals	Apps	Goals
Cerro	2003	Uruguayan Primera División	2	0	0	0	—		—		2	0
Cerro	2004	Uruguayan Primera División	14	0	1	0	—		—		15	0
Cerro	2005	Uruguayan Primera División	17	1	0	0	—		—		17	1
Cerro	2005–06	Uruguayan Primera División	30	5	0	0	—		—		30	5
Cerro	Total		63	6	1	0	—		—		64	6
Nacional	2006–07	Uruguayan Primera División	26	0	4	0	16 (Note: Ten appearances and two goals in Copa Libertadores, six appearances in Copa Sudamericana)	2	—		46	2
Villarreal	2007–08	La Liga	24	1	3	0	7 (Note: Appearances in UEFA Cup)	0	—		34	1
Villarreal	2008–09	La Liga	31	0	0	0	7 (Note: Appearances in UEFA Champions League)	0	—		38	0
Villarreal	2009–10	La Liga	36	3	2	0	6 (Note: Appearances in UEFA Europa League)	0	—		44	3
Villarreal	Total		91	4	5	0	20	0	—		116	4
Atlético Madrid	2010–11	La Liga	25	0	1	1	3	1	1 (Note: Appearance in UEFA Super Cup)	0	30	2
Atlético Madrid	2011–12	La Liga	27	2	1	0	13	1	—		41	3
Atlético Madrid	2012–13	La Liga	35	1	5	0	1	0	1	0	42	1
Atlético Madrid	2013–14	La Liga	34	4	5	2	10	2	2 (Note: Appearances in Supercopa de España)	0	51	8
Atlético Madrid	2014–15	La Liga	34	3	3	0	9	1	2	0	48	4
Atlético Madrid	2015–16	La Liga	31	1	3	0	12	0	—		46	1
Atlético Madrid	2016–17	La Liga	31	3	5	0	11	0	—		47	3
Atlético Madrid	2017–18	La Liga	30	0	3	1	12 (Note: Four appearances in UEFA Champions League, eight appearances in UEFA Europa League)	0	—		45	1
Atlético Madrid	2018–19	La Liga	30	3	2	0	6	1	1	0	39	4
Atlético Madrid	Total		277	17	28	4	77	6	7	0	389	27
Inter Milan	2019–20	Serie A	23	1	2	0	11 (Note: Five appearances in UEFA Champions League, six appearances and one goal in UEFA Europa League)	1	—		36	2
Cagliari	2020–21	Serie A	28	1	0	0	—		—		28	1
Cagliari	2021–22	Serie A	11	0	1	0	—		—		12	0
Cagliari	Total		39	1	1	0	—		—		40	1
Atlético Mineiro	2022	Série A	1	0	1	0	2 (Note: Appearances in Copa Libertadores)	0	5 (Note: Four appearances and one goal in Campeonato Mineiro, one appearance in Supercopa do Brasil)	1	9	1
Vélez Sarsfield	2022	Argentine Primera División	6	1	0	0	2	0	—		8	1
Vélez Sarsfield	2023	Argentine Primera División	13	0	1	0	—		—		14	0
Vélez Sarsfield	Total		19	1	1	0	2	0	—		22	1
Career total			539	30	43	4	128	9	12	1	722	44

=== International ===
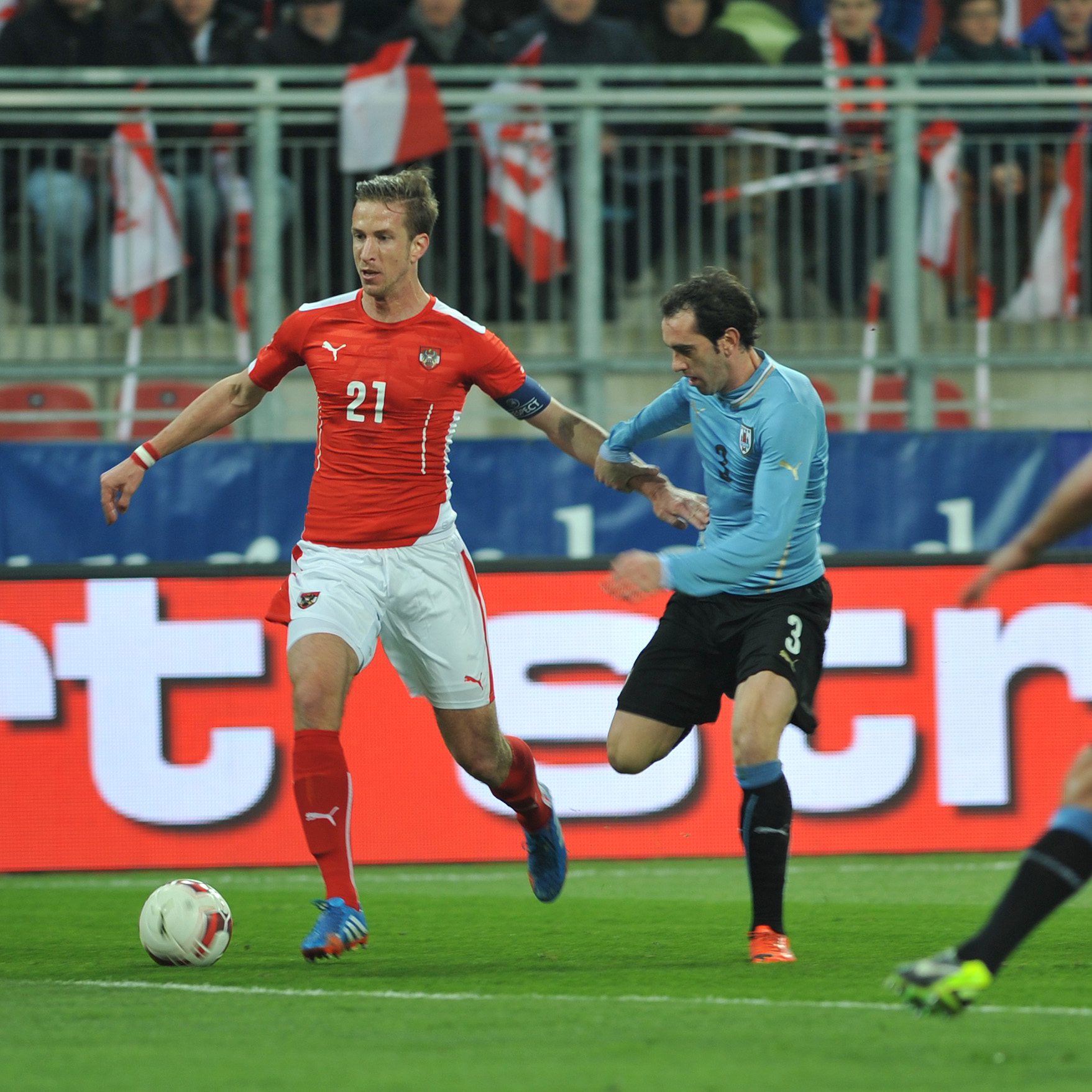
Godín (right) and Austria's Marc Janko in March 2014

Appearances and goals by national team and year
National team	Year	Apps	Goals
Uruguay	2005	1	0
Uruguay	2006	9	3
Uruguay	2007	8	0
Uruguay	2008	9	0
Uruguay	2009	9	0
Uruguay	2010	7	0
Uruguay	2011	9	0
Uruguay	2012	9	0
Uruguay	2013	14	0
Uruguay	2014	11	1
Uruguay	2015	11	3
Uruguay	2016	9	1
Uruguay	2017	7	0
Uruguay	2018	11	0
Uruguay	2019	11	0
Uruguay	2020	4	0
Uruguay	2021	14	0
Uruguay	2022	8	0
Total		161	8

Scores and results list Uruguay's goal tally first.

List of international goals scored by Diego Godín
No.	Date	Venue	Opponent	Score	Result	Competition
1	27 May 2006	Red Star Stadium, Belgrade, Serbia and Montenegro	Serbia and Montenegro	1–1	1–1	Friendly
2	16 August 2006	Alexandria Stadium, Alexandria, Egypt	Egypt	1–0	2–0	Friendly
3	18 October 2006	Estadio Centenario, Montevideo, Uruguay	Venezuela	1–0	4–0	Friendly
4	24 June 2014	Arena das Dunas, Natal, Brazil	Italy	1–0	1–0	2014 FIFA World Cup
5	8 October 2015	Estadio Hernando Siles, Paz, Bolivia	Bolivia	1–0	2–0	2018 FIFA World Cup qualification
6	13 October 2015	Estadio Centenario, Montevideo, Uruguay	Colombia	1–0	3–0	2018 FIFA World Cup qualification
7	17 November 2015	Estadio Centenario, Montevideo, Uruguay	Chile	1–0	3–0	2018 FIFA World Cup qualification
8	5 June 2016	University of Phoenix Stadium, Glendale, United States	Mexico	1–1	1–3	Copa América Centenario

== Honours ==
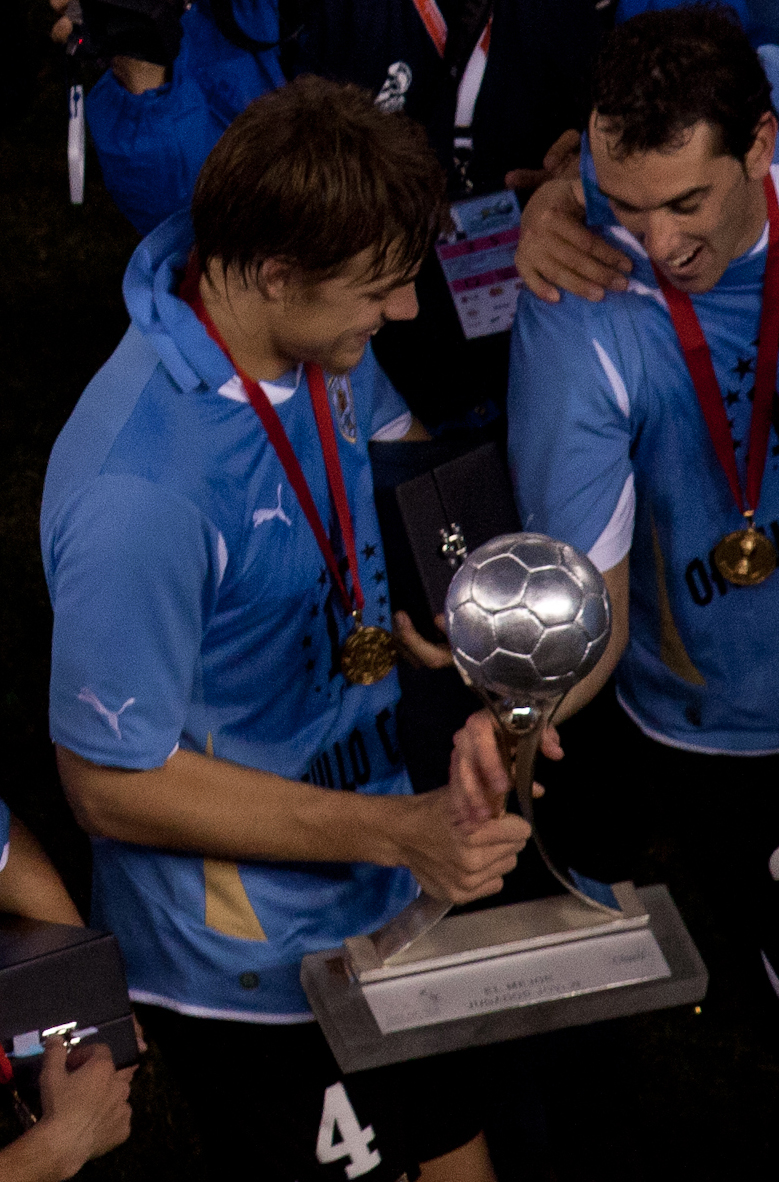
Godín (right) and Sebastián Coates celebrate winning the 2011 Copa América

Atlético Madrid

- La Liga: 2013–14
- Copa del Rey: 2012–13
- Supercopa de España: 2014
- UEFA Europa League: 2011–12, 2017–18
- UEFA Super Cup: 2010, 2012, 2018
- UEFA Champions League runner-up: 2013–14, 2015–16

Inter Milan

- UEFA Europa League runner-up: 2019–20

Atlético Mineiro

- Supercopa do Brasil: 2022
- Campeonato Mineiro: 2022

Uruguay

- Copa América: 2011

Individual

- La Liga Player of the Month: April 2014, May 2014
- La Liga Team of the Season: 2013–14, 2015–16
- UEFA Champions League Squad of the Season: 2013–14, 2015–16, 2016–17
- UEFA Team of the Year: 2014
- UEFA Champions League Team of the group stage: 2015
- La Liga Best Defender: 2015–16
- UEFA La Liga Team of the Season: 2015–16
- European Sports Media Team of the Year: 2015–16
- UEFA Europa League Squad of the Season: 2017–18
- FIFA World Cup Dream Team: 2018
- IFFHS Men's World Team: 2018
- IFFHS Uruguayan Men's Dream Team

== See also ==
- List of footballers with 100 or more caps
