= Sílvio (footballer, born 1987) =

Portuguese footballer

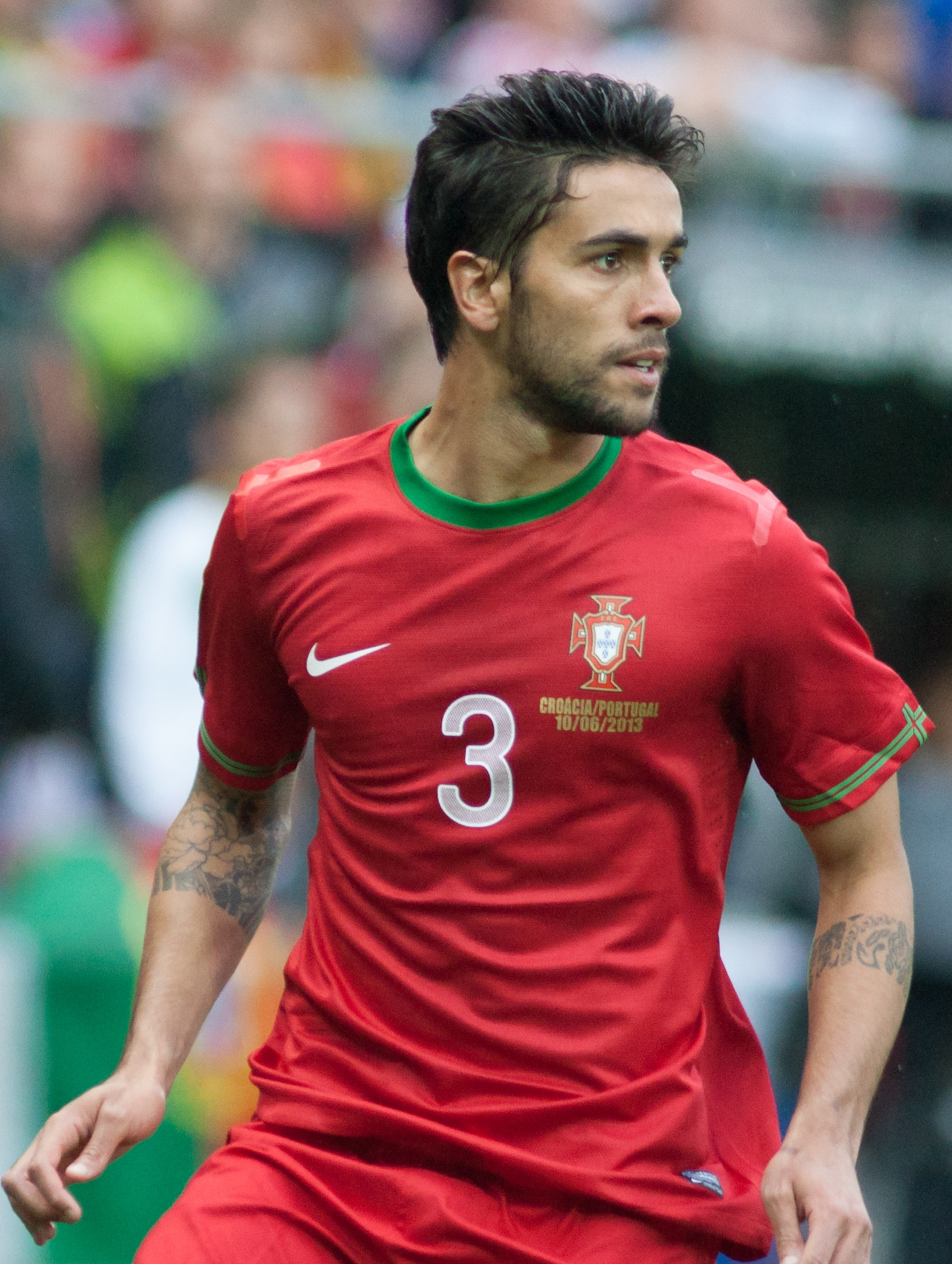
- Sílvio playing for Portugal in 2013

Personal information
- Full name: Sílvio Manuel de Azevedo Ferreira Sá Pereira
- Date of birth: 28 September 1987 (age 39)
- Place of birth: Lisbon, Portugal
- Height: 1.76 m (5 ft 9 in)
- Position: Full-back

Youth career
- 1995–2006: Benfica

Senior career*
Years	Team	Apps	(Gls)
2006–2007	Atlético Cacém		
2007–2008	Odivelas	31	(0)
2008–2010	Rio Ave	45	(0)
2010–2011	Braga	20	(1)
2011–2016	Atlético Madrid	10	(0)
2013	→ Deportivo La Coruña (loan)	17	(2)
2013–2016	→ Benfica (loan)	13	(0)
2016–2017	Wolverhampton Wanderers	4	(0)
2018	Braga B	12	(2)
2019–2020	Vitória Setúbal	39	(0)
2020–2022	Vitória Guimarães	12	(0)
2022–2023	Vilafranquense	16	(0)
Total		219	(5)

International career
2005–2006	Portugal U19	2	(0)
2010	Portugal U23	1	(0)
2010–2013	Portugal	8	(0)
- * Club domestic league appearances and goals

Sílvio Manuel de Azevedo Ferreira Sá Pereira (born 28 September 1987), known simply as Sílvio, is a Portuguese former professional footballer. A defender, he was equally at ease as a right or left-back.

He made 129 Primeira Liga appearances for Rio Ave, Braga, Benfica, Vitória de Setúbal and Vitória de Guimarães, winning several honours while playing infrequently for the third of those clubs. Abroad, he featured in La Liga for Atlético Madrid and Deportivo, and spent a season in England with Wolverhampton Wanderers.

Sílvio won eight caps for Portugal in three years, making his debut in 2010.

== Club career ==
=== Early career ===
Born in Lisbon, Sílvio played youth football with local S.L. Benfica. In summer 2008, he moved straight from the lower leagues with Odivelas F.C. to the Primeira Liga with Rio Ave FC. He made his debut in the competition on 24 August in a 1–1 home draw against Benfica, and finished his second season with 27 appearances to help the Vila do Conde side to the 12th place, above the relegation zone.

In July 2010, Sílvio joined S.C. Braga, scoring his first top-flight and professional goal on in a 1–0 home win over C.S. Marítimo and playing 38 official games in his only season, including nine in the Minho club's runner-up run in the UEFA Europa League; he also began suffering from injury problems in this timeframe.

=== Atlético Madrid ===
Sílvio was confirmed as an Atlético Madrid player on 19 May 2011, on a five-year deal. He first appeared in La Liga on 28 August in a 0–0 home draw with CA Osasuna in which he played the full 90 minutes. On 20 November he suffered a knee injury against Levante UD, from which he went on to relapse several times.

In early January 2013, Sílvio was loaned to Deportivo de La Coruña until the end of the campaign, reuniting with several compatriots including manager Domingos Paciência, also his boss at Braga. He featured almost exclusively as left-back during his spell with the Galicians and even managed to score twice, in wins against RC Celta de Vigo (3–1 home victory) and RCD Mallorca (3–2 away win), but his team eventually suffered relegation.

Sílvio returned to Benfica on 10 July 2013, joining on a season-long move. His spell was again marred by injuries, the most serious occurring on 10 April 2014 in a Europa League quarter-final match against AZ Alkmaar, when he fractured both the fibula and tibia on his right leg after missing the ball and kicking teammate Luisão instead.

On 1 September 2014, Sílvio was loaned to defending champions Benfica again for one year. On 15 July 2015, the move was extended for a further campaign, and he totalled only 17 competitive games across both spells.

=== Wolverhampton Wanderers ===
On 30 July 2016, Sílvio signed a one-year deal (with the option of a second) with English Championship club Wolverhampton Wanderers after having his contract at Atlético terminated by mutual consent. Injury prevented him from making his competitive debut until 20 September, in a 2–0 away defeat against Newcastle United in the League Cup. His maiden league appearance occurred the following week, in a 2–1 loss at Wigan Athletic.

On 22 October 2016, in his debut at the Molineux Stadium, Sílvio scored an own goal in a 0–1 defeat to Leeds United, which ultimately caused head coach Walter Zenga to be sacked. After falling out of favour under interim Rob Edwards and then Paul Lambert, it was revealed that he had suffered what was thought to be a broken foot in December which would rule him out for up to four months.

Sílvio's return to action took place on 7 May 2017, playing the full 90 minutes in a 1–0 home victory over Preston North End and being subsequently praised for his performance. Later in that month, Wolves revealed that discussions were ongoing with the defender regarding the option for an additional 12-month deal, but despite the appointment of new manager and compatriot Nuno Espírito Santo, which he welcomed, it was announced on 26 June that his contract would not be renewed by mutual decision.

=== Return to Portugal ===
In early February 2018, Sílvio returned to both Portugal and Braga, joining their reserves in the LigaPro. He scored in his first-ever appearance in the competition, helping the visitors to a 3–2 away win against U.D. Oliveirense.

On 14 January 2019, Sílvio signed an 18-month deal with Vitória de Setúbal. He left the relegated team on 5 September 2020 to join Vitória de Guimarães for one season, under the management of his former Atlético and national teammate Tiago Mendes. Despite having been limited by a right thigh injury, the option to extend his contract for another year was enacted.

Sílvio left the Estádio D. Afonso Henriques in May 2022, with only 14 official matches to his credit. On 1 September, he was presented at U.D. Vilafranquense in the second tier. After his one season in Vila Franca de Xira, he retired at age 35.

== International career ==
Sílvio made his debut for Portugal on 7 September 2010, starting in a 1–0 away loss against Norway for the UEFA Euro 2012 qualifiers. He was overlooked for the final stages by manager Paulo Bento, however, due to injury.

== Career statistics ==
=== Club ===
As of match played 29 June 2017

Appearances and goals by club, season and competition
Club	Season	League		National cup		League cup		Continental		Other		Total	
Club	Season	Apps	Goals	Apps	Goals	Apps	Goals	Apps	Goals	Apps	Goals	Apps	Goals
Odivelas	2007–08	31	0	—		—		—		—		31	0
Rio Ave	2008–09	18	0	0	0	0	0	—		—		18	0
Rio Ave	2009–10	27	0	0	0	0	0	—		—		27	0
Rio Ave	Total	45	0	0	0	0	0	—		—		45	0
Braga	2010–11	20	1	1	0	1	0	16	0	—		38	1
Atlético Madrid	2011–12	9	0	0	0	—		5	0	—		14	0
Atlético Madrid	2012–13	1	0	2	0	—		4	0	—		7	0
Atlético Madrid	Total	10	0	2	0	—		9	0	—		21	0
Deportivo (loan)	2012–13	17	2	0	0	—		—		—		17	2
Benfica (loan)	2013–14	8	0	3	0	3	0	6	0	—		20	0
Benfica (loan)	2014–15	1	0	0	0	3	0	0	0	0	0	4	0
Benfica (loan)	2015–16	4	0	1	0	4	0	3	0	1	0	13	0
Benfica (loan)	Total	13	0	4	0	10	0	9	0	1	0	37	0
Wolverhampton Wanderers	2016–17	4	0	0	0	1	0	—		—		5	0
Career total		140	3	7	0	12	0	34	0	1	0	194	3

=== International ===
Appearances and goals by national team and year
National team	Year	Apps	Goals
Portugal	2010	1	0
Portugal	2011	4	0
Portugal	2012	1	0
Portugal	2013	2	0
Total		8	0

== Honours ==
Braga

- UEFA Europa League runner-up: 2010–11

Atlético Madrid

- Copa del Rey: 2012–13
- UEFA Europa League: 2011–12
- UEFA Super Cup: 2012

Benfica

- Primeira Liga: 2013–14, 2014–15, 2015–16
- Taça de Portugal: 2013–14
- Taça da Liga: 2013–14, 2014–15, 2015–16
- Supertaça Cândido de Oliveira runner-up: 2015
- UEFA Europa League runner-up: 2013–14
