= Cata Díaz =

Argentine footballer and manager

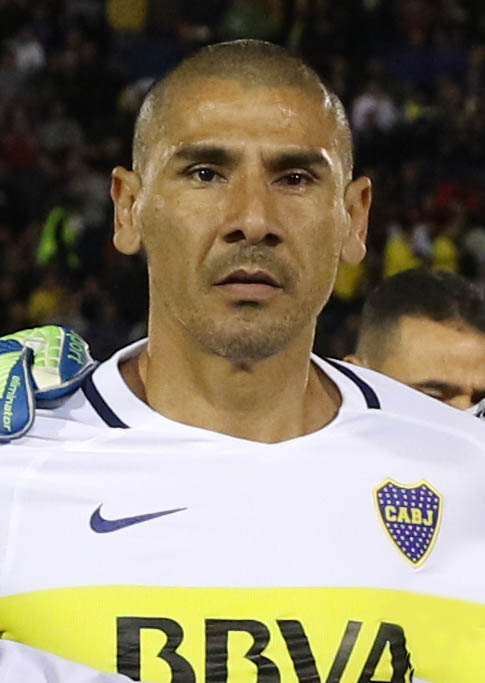
- Díaz with Boca Juniors in 2016

Personal information
- Full name: Daniel Alberto Díaz
- Date of birth: 13 July 1979 (age 47)
- Place of birth: San Fernando del Valle, Argentina
- Height: 1.82 m (6 ft 0 in)
- Position: Centre back

Team information
- Current team: Boca Juniors (management)

Youth career
- Juventud Catamarca
- 1997–1999: Rosario Central

Senior career*
Years	Team	Apps	(Gls)
1999–2003	Rosario Central	97	(2)
2003–2004	Cruz Azul	46	(1)
2004–2005	Colón	35	(2)
2005–2007	Boca Juniors	67	(7)
2007–2012	Getafe	165	(3)
2012–2013	Atlético Madrid	9	(0)
2013–2016	Boca Juniors	77	(6)
2016–2017	Getafe	38	(0)
2017–2019	Fuenlabrada	58	(1)
2019	Nueva Chicago	13	(0)
2020–2021	Móstoles URJC	10	(0)
Total		605	(22)

International career
2003–2009	Argentina	12	(1)

Managerial career
- 2020: Boca Juniors II (assistant)
- * Club domestic league appearances and goals

Daniel Alberto "Cata" Díaz (born 13 July 1979) is an Argentine professional football manager and former player who played as a central defender.

After starting at Rosario Central, he went on to spend most of his career in Spain, amassing La Liga totals of 174 matches and three goals over six seasons, mainly with Getafe. He also had two spells with Boca Juniors. Díaz also played for the Argentina including at the 2007 Copa América.

== Club career ==
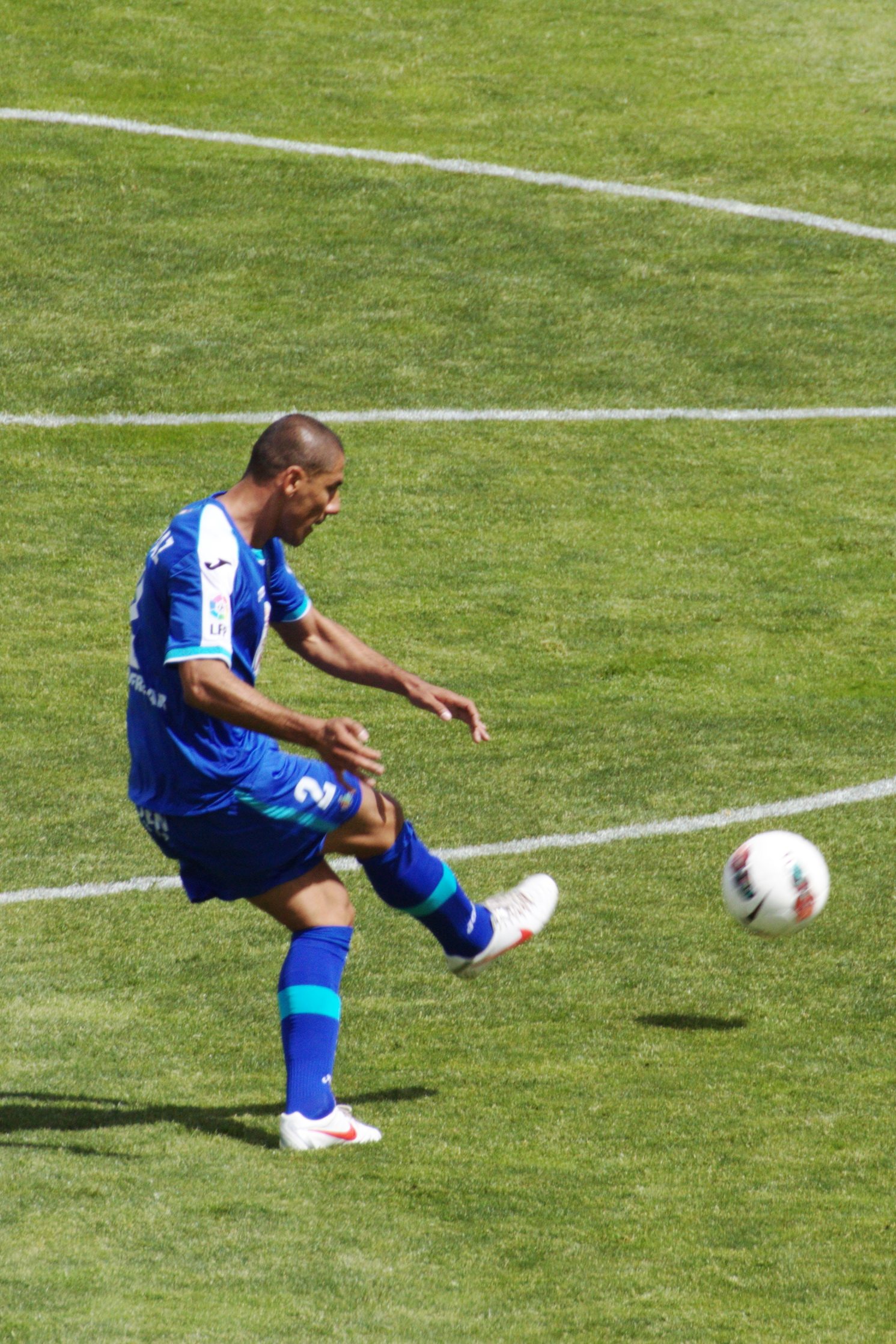
Díaz in action for Getafe in 2012

Nicknamed Cata because of his origins from San Fernando del Valle de Catamarca, Díaz started playing at youth amateur local Juventud de Catamarca before moving in 1997 to Rosario Central, still as a junior. Three years later, he first appeared professionally with the latter team.

Díaz moved to Cruz Azul in 2003. After only one season with the Mexican club, he returned to Argentina to become Alfio Basile's captain in Colón de Santa Fe; he subsequently drew attention from Argentine giants Boca Juniors and Club Atlético River Plate, but as Basile was at that time the former's coach, the player decided to make the move for around US$3 million.

Díaz made his debut for Boca in a 4–1 victory over Gimnasia y Esgrima de Jujuy, and was a big part in the side's 2005 Apertura-winning campaign. He added the South American Supercup (win over Once Caldas of Colombia), and the South American Cup (defeat of Mexico's Club Universidad Nacional).

In the middle of 2007, Díaz moved to Spain's Getafe CF for €4 million, being a defensive cornerstone from the very beginning as the Madrid outskirts team reached the quarter-finals of the UEFA Cup in 2007–08. During his spell at the Coliseum Alfonso Pérez he rarely missed one game when healthy – for instance, in his third season, he appeared in 30 matches (2,700 minutes of action) to help them finish sixth and qualify for the Europa League.

On 15 June 2012, at nearly 33, Díaz signed with fellow La Liga side Atlético Madrid for two years and €1 million. He was scarcely used during his only campaign by compatriot Diego Simeone and, subsequently, returned to his homeland and Boca.

On 23 July 2016, Díaz returned to Getafe after agreeing to a one-year deal for his first experience in Segunda División at the age of 37. On 1 September of the following year, after leaving the club due to his wife's direct criticism of manager José Bordalás, he joined CF Fuenlabrada of Segunda División B.

Díaz announced his retirement in February 2019, for personal reasons. He went back on his decision shortly after, however, and signed with Club Atlético Nueva Chicago of the Primera B Nacional.

== International career ==
Díaz made his first appearance with the Argentina national team in 2003, and was called to the 2007 Copa América squad as the nation finished second in Venezuela. On 6 June 2009, in a 2010 FIFA World Cup qualifier against Colombia, he scored his first and only international goal, finding the net in the 57th minute for a 1–0 home win; he would be, however, overlooked for the final stages in South Africa.

== Coaching and later career ==
On 29 November 2019, Díaz's contract expired and he retired for the second and definitive time. Subsequently, it was reported he was going to be named Miguel Ángel Russo's assistant at Boca Juniors, but he ended up joining the reserves in the same capacity, under Blas Giunta. However, 41-year old Cata, left the position at the end of September 2020 and came out of retirement, to play for Spanish club CD Móstoles URJC. He announced his retirement again on 23 May 2021.

In the summer 2021, he returned to Boca Juniors in a management-role, collaborating in different aspects.

== Personal life ==
Daniel is the younger brother of former football midfielder Juan Carlos Díaz, also nicknamed Cata.

== Honours ==
=== Club ===
Boca Juniors

- Argentine Primera División: Apertura 2005, Clausura 2006, 2015 Primera División
- Copa Argentina: 2014–15
- Copa Libertadores: 2007
- Recopa Sudamericana: 2005
- Copa Sudamericana: 2005

Atlético Madrid

- Copa del Rey: 2012–13
- UEFA Super Cup: 2012

=== International ===
Argentina

- Copa América runner-up: 2007
