= Jonathan Jacquet =

Argentine footballer

Personal information
- Full name: Jonathan Maximiliano Jacquet
- Date of birth: 30 April 1984 (age 42)
- Place of birth: Santa Fe, Argentina
- Height: 1.74 m (5 ft 9 in)
- Position: Midfielder

Senior career*
Years	Team	Apps	(Gls)
2004–2008	Gimnasia CdU	27	(2)
2008–2009	Coquimbo Unido	18	(2)
2009	Deportes Copiapó	6	(0)
2010	Sportivo Patria	6	(0)
2011–2015	DEPRO	31	(2)
- * Club domestic league appearances and goals

Jonathan Maximiliano Jacquet (born 30 April 1984) is an Argentine former footballer who played as a midfielder.

== Teams ==
- (Argentina) Gimnasia CdU 2004–2008
- (Chile) Coquimbo Unido 2008–2009
- (Chile) Deportes Copiapó 2009
- (Argentina) Sportivo Patria 2010
- (Argentina) Defensores de Pronunciamiento 2011–2015
