= 2013–14 Atlético Madrid season =

83rd season in existence of Atlético Madrid

Atlético Madrid
2013–14 season
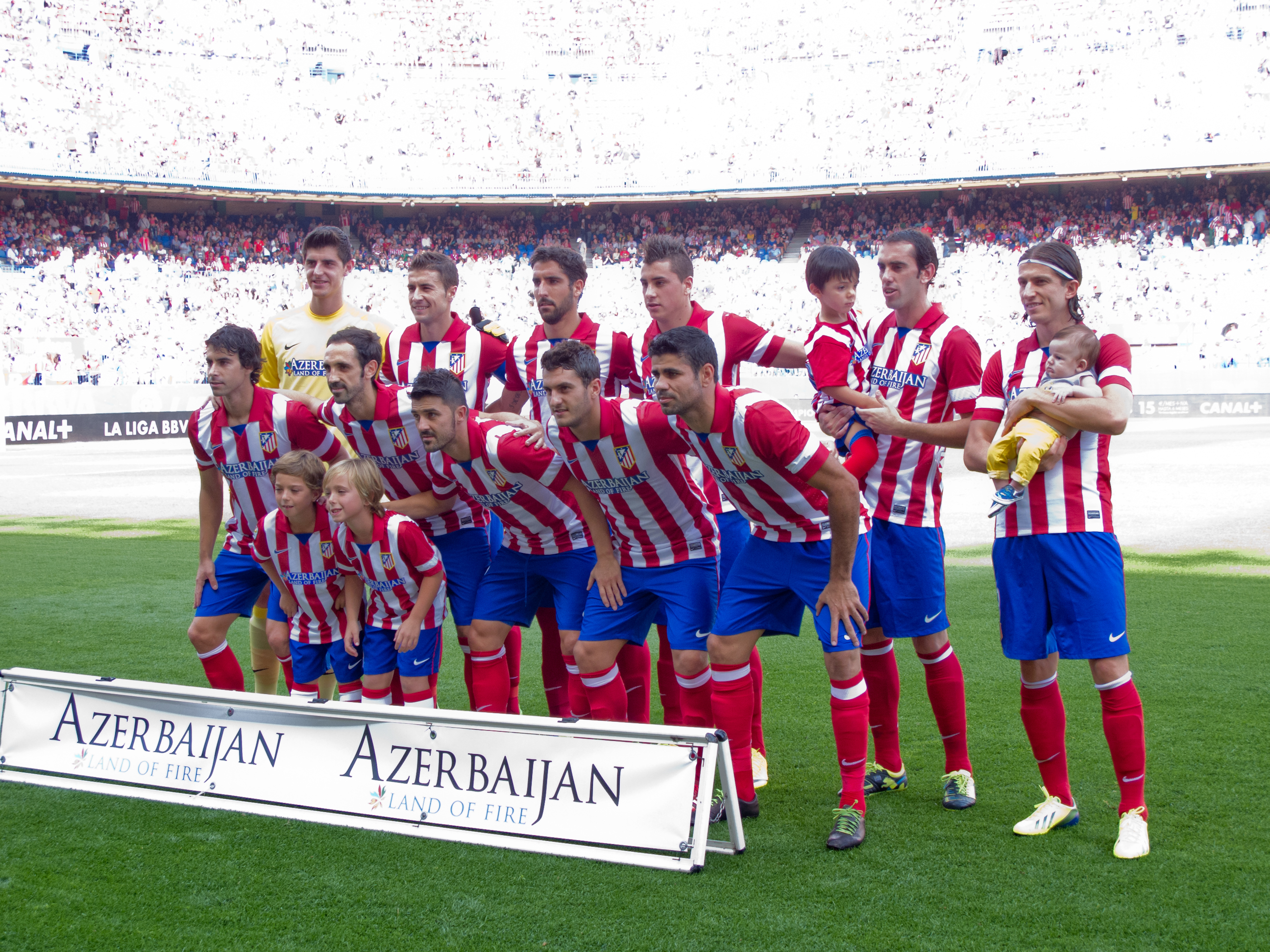
- Atlético line-up before a La Liga match versus Almería on 14 September 2013.
- President: Enrique Cerezo
- Head coach: Diego Simeone
- Stadium: Vicente Calderón
- La Liga: 1st
- Copa del Rey: Semi-finals
- Supercopa de España: Runners-up
- UEFA Champions League: Runners-up
- Top goalscorer: League: Diego Costa (27); All: Diego Costa (36)
- Highest home attendance: 54,600 (vs Real Madrid)
- Lowest home attendance: 35,000 (vs Rayo Vallecano & Osasuna)
- Average home league attendance: 47,000
| Home colours | Away colours | Third colours |

The 2013–14 season was Atlético Madrid's 83rd season in the club's history and the club's 77th season in La Liga, the top league of Spanish football. Los Colchoneros were crowned champions for the 10th time, by drawing against Barcelona in the last league game.

The Rojiblancos played against Real Madrid at the Estádio da Luz, Lisbon, in the 2014 UEFA Champions League Final on 24 May 2014, but lost 4–1 after extra time.

== Kits ==
Supplier: Nike / Main Sponsor: Azerbaijan / Back Sponsor: Kyocera

| Home | Home alt. | Away | Away alt. 1 | Away alt. 2 | Third | Goalkeeper 1 | Goalkeeper 2 | Goalkeeper 3 |

== Players ==
| No. | Pos. | Player | Age |
|---|---|---|---|
| 1 | GK | (Spain) Daniel Aranzubia | 34 |
| 2 | DF | (Uruguay) Diego Godín | 28 |
| 3 | DF | (Brazil) Filipe Luis | 28 |
| 4 | MF | (Spain) Mario Suárez | 27 |
| 5 | MF | (Portugal) Tiago | 33 |
| 6 | MF | (Spain) Koke | 21 |
| 7 | FW | (Spain) Adrián López | 26 |
| 8 | MF | (Spain) Raúl García | 27 |
| 9 | FW | (Spain) David Villa | 32 |
| 10 | MF | (Turkey) Arda Turan | 27 |
| 11 | FW | (Uruguay) Cristian Rodríguez | 28 |
| 12 | DF | (Belgium) Toby Alderweireld | 25 |
| 13 | GK | (Belgium) Thibaut Courtois | 22 |
| 14 | MF | (Spain) Gabi (c) | 31 |
| 18 | DF | (Uruguay) José Giménez | 19 |
| 19 | FW | (Spain) Diego Costa | 25 |
| 20 | DF | (Spain) Juanfran | 29 |
| 21 | MF | (Brazil) Diego Ribas | 29 |
| 22 | MF | (Argentina) Emiliano Insúa | 25 |
| 23 | DF | (Brazil) Miranda | 29 |
| 24 | FW | (Argentina) José Sosa | 28 |
| 26 | DF | (Spain) Javier Manquillo | 20 |

Source: Atlético.com

== Transfers ==
=== In ===
| No. | Pos. | Nat. | Name | Age | EU | Moving from | Type | Transfer window | Ends | Transfer fee | Source |
|---|---|---|---|---|---|---|---|---|---|---|---|
| 18 | CB | (Uruguay) | Jose Giménez | 18 | Non-EU | (Uruguay) Danubio | Transfer | Summer | | Undisclosed | Atlético.com |
| 21 | FW | (Brazil) | Léo Baptistão | 20 | Non-EU | Rayo Vallecano | Transfer | Summer | | €7M | Atlético.com |
| 9 | FW | (Spain) | David Villa | 31 | EU | Barcelona | Transfer | Summer | | €5.1M | |
| 24 | CB | (Argentina) | Martín Demichelis | 32 | Non-EU | Málaga | Transfer | Summer | | Free | |
| 12 | CB | (Belgium) | Toby Alderweireld | 24 | EU | (Netherlands) Ajax | Transfer | Summer | | €7M | AtléticoFans |
| 15 | MF | (France) | Josuha Guilavogui | 22 | EU | (France) Saint-Étienne | Transfer | Summer | | €10M | HITC Sport |

=== Out ===
| No. | Pos. | Nat. | Name | Age | EU | Moving to | Type | Transfer window | Transfer fee | Source |
|---|---|---|---|---|---|---|---|---|---|---|
| 9 | FW | (Colombia) | Radamel Falcao | 27 | Non-EU | (France) Monaco | Transfer | Summer | €60M | |
| 24 | CB | (Argentina) | Martín Demichelis | 32 | Non-EU | (England) Manchester City | Transfer | Summer | €5M | Reuters.com |

== Pre-season and friendlies ==
Win Draw Loss Fixtures

| 27 July 2013 Copa EuroAmericana | Estudiantes | 1–0 | Atlético Madrid | La Plata |
| 15:30 | Zapata 23' | Report | | Stadium: Estadio Ciudad de La Plata; Attendance: 37,000; Referee: Darío Ubriaco (Uruguay) |

| 31 July 2013 Copa EuroAmericana | Sporting Cristal | 0–1 | Atlético Madrid | Lima |
| 22:00 | | Report | M. Suárez 77' | Stadium: Estadio Nacional; Attendance: 19,500; Referee: Omar Ponce (Ecuador) |

| 4 August 2013 Copa EuroAmericana | Nacional | 0–2 | Atlético Madrid | Montevideo |
| 15:00 | De Pena (yellow card) | Report | Léo Baptistão 46', 79' | Stadium: Estadio Centenario; Attendance: 50,000; Referee: Saúl Laverni (Argentina) |

== Competitions ==
=== Supercopa de España ===
| 21 August 2013 First leg | Atlético Madrid | 1–1 | Barcelona | Madrid |
| 23:00 | Villa 12'; Juanfran (yellow card) 36'; Filipe Luís (yellow card) 39'; Suárez (yellow card) 56' | Report | Busquets (yellow card) 43'; Alba (yellow card) 65'; Neymar 66', (yellow card) 86' | Stadium: Vicente Calderón; Attendance: 54,851; Referee: Alberto Undiano Mallenco |

| 28 August 2013 Second leg | Barcelona | 0–0 (1 (a) –1 agg.) | Atlético Madrid | Barcelona |
| 23:00 | Fàbregas (yellow card) 28'; Busquets (yellow card) 30'; Piqué (yellow card) 54' | Report | Koke (yellow card) 26'; Filipe Luís (red card) 81'; Gabi (yellow card) 81'; Costa (yellow card) 85'; Godín (yellow card) 88'; Turan (red card) 90+1' | Stadium: Camp Nou; Attendance: 74,536; Referee: Fernández Borbalán (Andalusia) |
Note: Turan was sent off from the bench after being substituted.

=== La Liga ===
==== League table ====
| Pos | Team | Pld | W | D | L | GF | GA | GD | Pts | Qualification or relegation |
|---|---|---|---|---|---|---|---|---|---|---|
| 1 | Atlético Madrid (C) | 38 | 28 | 6 | 4 | 77 | 26 | +51 | 90 | Qualification for the Champions League group stage |
| 2 | Barcelona | 38 | 27 | 6 | 5 | 100 | 33 | +67 | 87 (Note: Barcelona finished ahead of Real Madrid on head-to-head points: Barcelona 2–1 Real Madrid, Real Madrid 3–4 Barcelona.) | Qualification for the Champions League group stage |
| 3 | Real Madrid | 38 | 27 | 6 | 5 | 104 | 38 | +66 | 87 | Qualification for the Champions League group stage |
| 4 | Athletic Bilbao | 38 | 20 | 10 | 8 | 66 | 39 | +27 | 70 | Qualification for the Champions League play-off round |
| 5 | Sevilla | 38 | 18 | 9 | 11 | 69 | 52 | +17 | 63 | Qualification for the Europa League group stage (Note: Sevilla automatically qualified for the 2014–15 UEFA Europa League group stage as the defending champions; the berth through their league position was vacated.) |

Source: La Liga, ESPN
Rules for classification: 1st points; 2nd head-to-head points;
(C) Champions

==== Results summary ====
| Overall | | | | | | | | Home | | | | | | Away | | | | | |
| Pld | W | D | L | GF | GA | GD | Pts | W | D | L | GF | GA | GD | W | D | L | GF | GA | GD |
|---|---|---|---|---|---|---|---|---|---|---|---|---|---|---|---|---|---|---|---|
| 38 | 28 | 6 | 4 | 77 | 26 | +51 | 90 | 15 | 4 | 0 | 49 | 10 | +39 | 13 | 2 | 4 | 28 | 16 | +12 |

Last updated: 18 May 2014.
Source: Competitive matches

==== Results by round ====
| Round | 1 | 2 | 3 | 4 | 5 | 6 | 7 | 8 | 9 | 10 | 11 | 12 | 13 | 14 | 15 | 16 | 17 | 18 | 19 | 20 | 21 | 22 | 23 | 24 | 25 | 26 | 27 | 28 | 29 | 30 | 31 | 32 | 33 | 34 | 35 | 36 | 37 | 38 |
|---|---|---|---|---|---|---|---|---|---|---|---|---|---|---|---|---|---|---|---|---|---|---|---|---|---|---|---|---|---|---|---|---|---|---|---|---|---|---|
| Ground | A | H | A | H | A | H | A | H | A | H | A | H | A | H | A | H | H | A | H | H | A | H | A | H | A | H | A | H | A | H | A | H | A | H | A | A | H | A |
| Result | W | W | W | W | W | W | W | W | L | W | W | W | D | W | W | W | W | W | D | D | W | W | L | W | L | D | W | W | W | W | W | W | W | W | W | L | D | D |
| Position | 3 | 2 | 2 | 2 | 2 | 2 | 2 | 2 | 2 | 2 | 2 | 2 | 2 | 2 | 2 | 2 | 2 | 2 | 2 | 2 | 2 | 1 | 3 | 3 | 3 | 3 | 2 | 2 | 1 | 1 | 1 | 1 | 1 | 1 | 1 | 1 | 1 | 1 |

Updated to match(es) played on 18 May 2014. Source: Competitive matches
A = Away; H = Home; W = Win; D = Draw; L = Loss

==== Matches ====
| 18 August 2013 1 | Sevilla | 1–3 | Atlético Madrid | Seville |
| 22:00 CEST (UTC+02:00) | Perotti 37', (yellow card) 44'; Kondogbia (yellow card) 49'; Coke (yellow card) 75'; Marin (yellow card) 85'; Vitolo (yellow card) 86' | Report | Turan (yellow card) 1'; Costa 35', 79'; Gabi (yellow card) 48'; Miranda (yellow card) 56'; Torres (yellow card) 66'; Rodríguez 90+2' | Stadium: Ramón Sánchez Pizjuán; Attendance: 35,000; Referee: Carlos Clos Gómez |

| 25 August 2013 2 | Atlético Madrid | 5–0 | Rayo Vallecano | Madrid |
| 22:00 CEST (UTC+02:00) | García 17', 90'; Costa 21'; Turan 35'; Tiago 53' | Report | Nacho (yellow card) 72' | Stadium: Vicente Calderón; Attendance: 35,000; Referee: Ignacio Iglesias Villanueva |

| 1 September 2013 3 | Real Sociedad | 1–2 | Atlético Madrid | San Sebastián |
| 18:00 CEST (UTC+02:00) | Zurutuza (yellow card) 65'; Prieto 68'; Bravo (yellow card) 90+2' | Report | Turan (yellow card) 25'; Villa 27'; Suárez (yellow card) 54'; Koke 57'; Gabi (yellow card) 73'; Filipe Luís (yellow card) 79' | Stadium: Anoeta; Attendance: 27,604; Referee: Miguel Ángel Ayza Gámez |

| 14 September 2013 4 | Atlético Madrid | 4–2 | Almería | Madrid |
| 16:00 CEST (UTC+02:00) | Villa 15'; Costa 37' (pen.); Filipe Luís (yellow card) 45+1'; García (yellow card) 52'; Tiago 64'; Koke 67' | Report | Trujillo (yellow card) 10'; Pellerano (yellow card) 36'; Rodri 40'; Tébar (yellow card) 53'; Suso (yellow card) 87'; Vidal 90' | Stadium: Vicente Calderón; Attendance: 48,000; Referee: José Luis González González |

| 21 September 2013 5 | Valladolid | 0–2 | Atlético Madrid | Valladolid |
| 22:00 CEST (UTC+02:00) | Sastre (yellow card) 13'; Rossi (yellow card) 53' | Report | Suárez (yellow card) 17'; García 56'; Gabi (yellow card) 68'; Costa 72' | Stadium: José Zorrilla; Attendance: 16,900; Referee: Alfonso Javier Álvarez Izquierdo |

| 24 September 2013 6 | Atlético Madrid | 2–1 | Osasuna | Madrid |
| 22:00 CEST (UTC+02:00) | Costa 18', 25'; Suárez (yellow card) 42'; Juanfran (yellow card) 70'; Tiago (yellow card) 87' | Report | Riera 42'; Lolo (yellow card) 88' | Stadium: Vicente Calderón; Attendance: 35,000; Referee: Javier Estrada Fernández |

| 28 September 2013 7 | Real Madrid | 0–1 | Atlético Madrid | Madrid |
| 22:00 CEST (UTC+02:00) | Coentrão (yellow card) 40'; Ramos (yellow card) 67'; Arbeloa (yellow card) 77'; Pepe (yellow card) 80' | Report | Costa 11', (yellow card) 49'; Turan (yellow card) 38'; Koke (yellow card) 43'; Filipe Luís (yellow card) 61' | Stadium: Santiago Bernabéu; Attendance: 79,845; Referee: Antonio Mateu Lahoz |

| 6 October 2013 8 | Atlético Madrid | 2–1 | Celta Vigo | Madrid |
| 12:00 CEST (UTC+02:00) | Costa 42', 62'; Godín (yellow card) 81' | Report | Nolito 71'; Charles (yellow card) 66'; Mallo (yellow card) 72'; Oubiña (yellow card) 80' | Stadium: Vicente Calderón; Attendance: 47,000; Referee: Alberto Undiano Mallenco |

| 20 October 2013 9 | Espanyol | 1–0 | Atlético Madrid | Cornellà de Llobregat |
| 22:00 CEST (UTC+02:00) | Moreno (yellow card) 30'; J. López (yellow card) 42'; Courtois 54' (o.g.); D. López (yellow card) 60'; S.S.N. García (yellow card) 83'; Abraham (yellow card) 84' | Report | Villa (yellow card) 30'; Koke (yellow card) 40'; Rodríguez (yellow card) 83'; Courtois (yellow card) 90+3' | Stadium: Cornellà-El Prat; Attendance: 26,711; Referee: David Fernández Borbalán |

| 27 October 2013 10 | Atlético Madrid | 5–0 | Real Betis | Madrid |
| 21:00 CEST (UTC+02:00) | Torres 1'; Villa 53', 57'; Costa 65'; Gabi 90+2' | Report | Nosa (yellow card) 20'; Cedrick (yellow card) 53' | Stadium: Vicente Calderón; Attendance: 50,000; Referee: Juan Martínez Munuera |

| 31 October 2013 11 | Granada | 1–2 | Atlético Madrid | Granada |
| 20:00 CET (UTC+01:00) | Ighalo 90' | Report | Juanfran (yellow card) 34'; Costa 38' (pen.); Filipe Luis (yellow card) 65' (yellow-red card) 89'; Villa 78' (pen.); Courtois (yellow card) 90+4' | Stadium: Los Cármenes; Attendance: 15,000; Referee: José Luis González González |

| 3 November 2013 12 | Atlético Madrid | 2–0 | Athletic Bilbao | Madrid |
| 17:00 CET (UTC+01:00) | Miranda (yellow card) 6'; Godín (yellow card) 23'; Villa 32'; Costa 41', (yellow card) 74'; Juanfran (yellow card) 60'; García (yellow card) 76' | Report | Iraola (yellow card) 27'; Muniain (yellow card) 44'; Morán (yellow card) 64' (yellow-red card) 79' | Stadium: Vicente Calderón; Attendance: 52,000; Referee: Fernando Teixeira Vitienes |

| 10 November 2013 13 | Villarreal | 1–1 | Atlético Madrid | Villarreal |
| 19:00 CET (UTC+01:00) | Bruno (yellow card) 18'; J. Costa (yellow card) 73'; Uche 78'; Perbet (yellow card) 81' | Report | Mario 2' (o.g.); Tiago (yellow card) 20'; Gabi (yellow card) 52'; García (yellow card) 58'; Koke (yellow card) 75' | Stadium: El Madrigal; Attendance: 17,100; Referee: Pedro Jesús Pérez Montero (Andalusia) |

| 23 November 2013 14 | Atlético Madrid | 7–0 | Getafe | Madrid |
| 22:00 CET (UTC+01:00) | García (yellow card) 14', (goal) 26', 52'; Turan (yellow card) 35'; Lopo 37' (o.g.); Villa 49', 78'; Costa 69'; Adrián 90+3' | Report | Borja (yellow card) 18'; Míchel (yellow card) 20'; Valera (yellow card) 33' (yellow-red card) 42' | Stadium: Vicente Calderón; Attendance: 48,000; Referee: Carlos Clos Gómez |

| 1 December 2013 15 | Elche | 0–2 | Atlético Madrid | Elche |
| 16:00 CET (UTC+01:00) | Botía (yellow card) 26'; Damián Suárez (yellow card) 63' | Report | Tiago (yellow card) 14'; Villa (yellow card) 17'; Koke 63', (yellow card) 83'; Filipe Luis (yellow card) 66'; Costa 74' | Stadium: Martínez Valero; Attendance: 33,001; Referee: Carlos Delgado Ferreiro |

| 15 December 2013 16 | Atlético Madrid | 3–0 | Valencia | Madrid |
| 21:00 CET (UTC+01:00) | Juanfran (yellow card) 36'; Costa (yellow card) 45', (goal) 59', 81' (pen.); García 63' | Report | Oriol Romeu (yellow card) 12'; Feghouli (yellow card) 15'; Parejo (yellow card) 45'; Víctor Ruiz (yellow card) 74' | Stadium: Vicente Calderón; Attendance: 46,200; Referee: David Fernández Borbalán |

| 21 December 2013 17 | Atlético Madrid | 3–2 | Levante | Madrid |
| 20:00 CET (UTC+01:00) | Gabi (yellow card) 13'; Godín 30', (yellow card) 90+2'; Costa 47', 77' (pen.); García (yellow card) 87' | Report | Ivanschitz 1'; Ríos 56'; Rubén (yellow card) 11'; Nikos (yellow card) 45+1'; López (yellow card) 56'; Diop (yellow card) 67'; Pinto (yellow card) 88'; Juanfran (red card) 90' | Stadium: Vicente Calderón; Attendance: 49,000; Referee: José Luis González González |

| 4 January 2014 18 | Málaga | 0–1 | Atlético Madrid | Málaga |
| 16:00 CET (UTC+01:00) | Darder (yellow card) 24'; Angeleri (yellow card) 41'; Samuel (yellow card) 87'; Antunes (yellow card) 90' | Report | Miranda (yellow card) 10'; Tiago (yellow card) 26'; Koke 71' costa (yellow card) 76'; Courtois (yellow card) 83'; Rodríguez (yellow card) 86' | Stadium: La Rosaleda; Attendance: 30,000; Referee: José Antonio Teixeira Vitienes |

| 11 January 2014 19 | Atlético Madrid | 0–0 | Barcelona | Madrid |
| 20:00 CET (UTC+01:00) | Gabi (yellow card) 44'; Godín (yellow card) 46' | Report | Alba (yellow card) 57'; Mascherano (yellow card) 72'; Dani Alves (yellow card) 83' | Stadium: Vicente Calderón; Attendance: 53,000; Referee: Antonio Mateu Lahoz |

| 19 January 2014 20 | Atlético Madrid | 1–1 | Sevilla | Madrid |
| 21:00 CET (UTC+01:00) | Villa 18'; Juanfran (yellow card) 71'; Gabi (yellow card) 72' | Report | Pareja (yellow card) 13'; Rakitić 73' (pen.), (yellow card) 90'; Moreno (red card) 89' | Stadium: Vicente Calderón; Attendance: 45,000; Referee: Alejandro José Hernández Hernández |

| 26 January 2014 21 | Rayo Vallecano | 2–4 | Atlético Madrid | Madrid |
| 19:00 CET (UTC+01:00) | Baena (yellow card) 26'; Viera 40'; Saúl (yellow card) 63'; Larrivey 76' | Report | Villa 8'; Turan 30', 44'; Manquillo (yellow card) 54'; Saúl 74' (o.g.) | Stadium: Campo de Fútbol de Vallecas; Attendance: 14,100; Referee: Alberto Undiano Mallenco |

| 2 February 2014 22 | Atlético Madrid | 4–0 | Real Sociedad | Madrid |
| 19:00 CET (UTC+01:00) | Villa 38'; Costa 72'; Miranda (yellow card) 22', (goal) 74'; García (yellow card) 69'; Diego 87' | Report | Zurutuza (yellow card) 17'; Martínez (yellow card) 84' | Stadium: Vicente Calderón; Attendance: 51,800; Referee: Javier Estrada Fernández |

| 8 February 2014 23 | Almería | 1–0 | Atlético Madrid | Almería |
| 22:00 CET (UTC+01:00) | Suso (yellow card) 58'; Dubarbier (yellow card) 58'; Verza 80', 86' (pen.) | Report | Diego (yellow card) 23'; García (yellow card) 55' | Stadium: Juegos Mediterráneos; Attendance: 16,000; Referee: Fernando Teixeira Vitienes |

| 15 February 2014 24 | Atlético Madrid | 3–0 | Valladolid | Madrid |
| 16:00 CET (UTC+01:00) | García 3'; Costa 4'; Godín 74' | Report | Pérez (yellow card) 82'; Peña (yellow card) 82'; Mitrović (yellow card) 86' | Stadium: Vicente Calderón; Attendance: 47,000; Referee: Eduardo Prieto Iglesias |

| 23 February 2014 25 | Osasuna | 3–0 | Atlético Madrid | Pamplona |
| 21:00 CET (UTC+01:00) | Cejudo 6'; Armenteros 21'; Torres 42' | Report | Suárez (yellow card) 34' | Stadium: El Sadar; Attendance: 15,361; Referee: Juan Martínez Munuera |

| 2 March 2014 26 | Atlético Madrid | 2–2 | Real Madrid | Madrid |
| 17:00 CET (UTC+01:00) | Turan (yellow card) 11'; Koke 28'; Godín (yellow card) 39'; Gabi 45+1'; Costa (yellow card) 64' | Report | Benzema 3'; Pepe (yellow card) 39'; Arbeloa (yellow card) 67'; Ronaldo 82' | Stadium: Vicente Calderón; Attendance: 54,600; Referee: Carlos Delgado Ferreiro |

| 8 March 2014 27 | Celta Vigo | 0–2 | Atlético Madrid | Vigo |
| 20:00 CET (UTC+01:00) | Charles (yellow card) 19' | Report | Gabi (yellow card) 8'; Suárez (yellow card) 31'; Villa 62', 64'; Miranda (yellow card) 66' | Stadium: Balaídos; Attendance: 29,600; Referee: Antonio Mateu Lahoz |

| 15 March 2014 28 | Atlético Madrid | 1–0 | Espanyol | Madrid |
| 22:00 CET (UTC+01:00) | Turan (yellow card) 52'; Costa 55'; Godín (yellow card) 69'; Tiago (yellow card) 90' | Report | López (yellow card) 32'; Córdoba (yellow card) 78'; Sánchez (yellow card) 83' | Stadium: Vicente Calderón; Attendance: 45,000; Referee: Pedro Jesús Pérez Montero |

| 23 March 2014 29 | Real Betis | 0–2 | Atlético Madrid | Seville |
| 17:00 CET (UTC+01:00) | Rodríguez (yellow card) 29' (yellow-red card) 55'; Molina (yellow card) 61'; Matilla (yellow card) 88' | Report | Filipe Luís (yellow card) 41'; Gabi 58'; Costa 64'; Diego (yellow card) 89' | Stadium: Benito Villamarín; Attendance: 31,132; Referee: Javier Estrada Fernández |

| 26 March 2014 30 | Atlético Madrid | 1–0 | Granada | Madrid |
| 22:00 CET (UTC+01:00) | Gabi (yellow card) 41'; Costa 63' | Report | Angulo (yellow card) 29'; Coeff (yellow card) 39'; Brahimi (yellow card) 44' | Stadium: Vicente Calderón; Attendance: 41,200; Referee: Juan Martínez Munuera |

| 29 March 2014 31 | Athletic Bilbao | 1–2 | Atlético Madrid | Bilbao |
| 20:00 CET (UTC+01:00) | Muniain 6', (yellow card) 80'; Iturraspe (yellow card) 64'; Laporte (yellow card) 70' (yellow-red card) 86'; Balenziaga (yellow card) 90+4' | Report | Costa 22'; Gabi (yellow card) 42'; Koke 55'; Godín (yellow card) 60' | Stadium: San Mamés; Attendance: 35,650; Referee: José Antonio Teixeira Vitienes |

| 5 April 2014 32 | Atlético Madrid | 1–0 | Villarreal | Madrid |
| 16:00 CEST (UTC+02:00) | García 14', (yellow card) 69'; Koke (yellow card) 67'; Suárez (yellow card) 80' | Report | Gabriel (yellow card) 42' | Stadium: Vicente Calderón; Attendance: 50,000; Referee: Juan Martínez Munuera |

| 13 April 2014 33 | Getafe | 0–2 | Atlético Madrid | Getafe |
| 19:00 CEST (UTC+02:00) | Mosquera (yellow card) 22'; Alexis (yellow card) 25'; Lafita (yellow card) 51' (red card) 64' | Report | Godín (yellow card) 16', (goal) 40'; Villa (yellow card) 45'; Costa (yellow card) 76', (goal) 84' | Stadium: Coliseum Alfonso Pérez; Attendance: 12,100; Referee: David Fernández Borbalán |

| 18 April 2014 34 | Atlético Madrid | 2–0 | Elche | Madrid |
| 20:30 CEST (UTC+02:00) | Costa (yellow card) 63', (goal) 90+1' (pen.); Miranda 72'; García (yellow card) 73' | Report | Săpunaru (yellow card) 49' (red card) 90'; Coro (yellow card) 55'; Rivera (yellow card) 63'; Pelegrín (yellow card) 65' | Stadium: Vicente Calderón; Attendance: 48,782; Referee: Carlos Clos Gómez |

| 27 April 2014 35 | Valencia | 0–1 | Atlético Madrid | Valencia |
| 17:00 CEST (UTC+02:00) | Jonas (yellow card) 37'; Fuego (yellow card) 85'; Vargas (yellow card) 90' | Report | García 43'; Godín (yellow card) 70'; Juanfran (red card) 90+1' | Stadium: Mestalla; Attendance: 27,500; Referee: Alberto Undiano Mallenco |

| 4 May 2014 36 | Levante | 2–0 | Atlético Madrid | Valencia |
| 17:00 CEST (UTC+02:00) | Filipe Luís 7' (o.g.); Barral (yellow card) 60', (goal) 69'; Simão Mate (yellow card) 72' | Report | Tiago (yellow card) 56'; Godín (yellow card) 76'; Turan (yellow card) 78' | Stadium: Ciutat de València; Attendance: 22,156; Referee: José Luis González González |

| 11 May 2014 37 | Atlético Madrid | 1–1 | Málaga | Madrid |
| 19:00 CEST (UTC+02:00) | Turan (yellow card) 35'; Alderweireld 74'; Tiago (yellow card) 78'; Gabi (yellow card) 87' | Report | Weligton (yellow card) 4'; Angeleri (yellow card) 43' (yellow-red card) 88'; Eliseu (yellow card) 51'; Samu 65' | Stadium: Vicente Calderón; Attendance: 46,000; Referee: José Antonio Teixeira Vitienes |

| 17 May 2014 38 | Barcelona | 1–1 | Atlético Madrid | Barcelona |
| 18:00 CEST (UTC+02:00) | Piqué (yellow card) 5'; Sánchez 33'; Messi (yellow card) 45+3'; Busquets (yellow card) 45+3'; Song (yellow card) 73'; Mascherano (yellow card) 90' | Report | Godín (yellow card) 36', (goal) 49'; Tiago (yellow card) 37'; Filipe Luís (yellow card) 69'; García (yellow card) 90+2' | Stadium: Camp Nou; Attendance: 96,973; Referee: Antonio Mateu Lahoz |

=== Copa del Rey ===
==== Round of 32 ====
| 7 December 2013 First leg | Sant Andreu | 0–4 | Atlético Madrid | Barcelona |
| 16:00 | | Report | García 12'; Turan 20', 55'; Villa 85' | Stadium: Narcís Sala; Attendance: 6,563; Referee: Alberto Undiano Mallenco |

| 18 December 2013 Second leg | Atlético Madrid | 2–1 (6–1 agg.) | Sant Andreu | Madrid |
| 18:30 | Héctor 79'; Alderweireld 90+2' | Report | Carroza 14' | Stadium: Vicente Calderón; Referee: Juan Martínez Munuera (Valencian Community) |

==== Round of 16 ====
| 8 January 2014 First leg | Valencia | 1–1 | Atlético Madrid | Valencia |
| 22:00 | Postiga 90+3' | Report | García 72' | Stadium: Mestalla; Attendance: 36,000; Referee: Carlos Clos Gómez (Aragon) |

| 14 January 2014 Second leg | Atlético Madrid | 2–0 (3–1 agg.) | Valencia | Madrid |
| 21:30 | Godín 51'; García 89' | Report | | Stadium: Vicente Calderón; Attendance: 26,455; Referee: Javier Estrada Fernández (Catalonia) |

==== Quarter-finals ====
| 23 January 2014 First leg | Atlético Madrid | 1–0 | Athletic Bilbao | Madrid |
| | Godín 41' | Report | | Stadium: Vicente Calderón; Attendance: 40,000; Referee: David Fernández Borbalán (Andalusia) |

| 29 January 2014 Second leg | Athletic Bilbao | 1–2 (1–3 agg.) | Atlético Madrid | Bilbao |
| 20:00 | Aduriz 42' | Report | García 55'; Costa 86' | Stadium: San Mamés; Attendance: 34,000; Referee: Antonio Mateu Lahoz (Valencian Community) |

==== Semi-finals ====
| 5 February 2014 First leg | Real Madrid | 3–0 | Atlético Madrid | Madrid |
| 20:00 | Pepe 17', (yellow card) 24'; Jesé 57'; Di María 73' | Report | Diego (yellow card) 27'; Costa (yellow card) 61'; Juanfran (yellow card) 78'; Miranda (yellow card) 88' | Stadium: Santiago Bernabéu; Attendance: 77,500; Referee: Carlos Clos Gómez (Aragon) |

| 11 February 2014 Second leg | Atlético Madrid | 0–2 (0–5 agg.) | Real Madrid | Madrid |
| 21:00 CET (UTC+01:00) | Miranda (yellow card) 80' | Report | Ronaldo 7' (pen.), 16' (pen.), (yellow card) 44'; Illarramendi (yellow card) 36'; Arbeloa (yellow card) 43' | Stadium: Estadio Vicente Calderón; Attendance: 47,600; Referee: Alberto Undiano Mallenco (Navarre) |

=== UEFA Champions League ===
==== Group stage ====
| Pos | Team | Pld | W | D | L | GF | GA | GD | Pts | Qualification | ATM | ZEN | POR | AWI |
|---|---|---|---|---|---|---|---|---|---|---|---|---|---|---|
| 1 | (Spain) Atlético Madrid | 6 | 5 | 1 | 0 | 15 | 3 | +12 | 16 | Advance to knockout phase | — | 3–1 | 2–0 | 4–0 |
| 2 | (Russia) Zenit Saint Petersburg | 6 | 1 | 3 | 2 | 5 | 9 | −4 | 6 | Advance to knockout phase | 1–1 | — | 1–1 | 0–0 |
| 3 | (Portugal) Porto | 6 | 1 | 2 | 3 | 4 | 7 | −3 | 5 (Note: Head-to-head points: Porto 4, Austria Wien 1.) | Transfer to Europa League | 1–2 | 0–1 | — | 1–1 |
| 4 | Austria Wien | 6 | 1 | 2 | 3 | 5 | 10 | −5 | 5 | | 0–3 | 4–1 | 0–1 | — |

Source: UEFA
Notes:

| 18 September 2013 1 | Atlético Madrid (Spain) | 3–1 | (Russia) Zenit Saint Petersburg | Madrid, Spain |
| 20:45 CEST | Miranda 40'; Godín (yellow card) 45'; Turan 64'; Baptistão 80' | Report | Lombaerts (yellow card) 49'; Hulk 58', (yellow card) 79'; Smolnikov (yellow card) 54'; Hubočan (yellow card) 65' | Stadium: Vicente Calderón Stadium; Attendance: 33,855; Referee: William Collum (Scotland) |

| 1 October 2013 2 | Porto (Portugal) | 1–2 | (Spain) Atlético Madrid | Porto, Portugal |
| 20:45 CEST | Martínez 16'; Josué (yellow card) 29'; Mangala (yellow card) 85' | Report | Tiago (yellow card) 55'; Godín 58'; Juanfran (yellow card) 62'; Turan 86' | Stadium: Estádio do Dragão; Attendance: 33,989; Referee: Howard Webb (England) |

| 22 October 2013 3 | Austria Wien | 0–3 | (Spain) Atlético Madrid | Vienna, Austria |
| 20:45 CEST | Hosiner (yellow card) 17'; Holland (yellow card) 31'; Kienast (yellow card) 38'; Suttner (yellow card) 48' | Report | García 8', (yellow card) 45'; Costa 20', 54'; Gabi (yellow card) 57'; Juanfran | Stadium: Ernst-Happel-Stadion; Attendance: 45,675; Referee: Daniele Orsato (Italy) |

| 6 November 2013 4 | Atlético Madrid (Spain) | 4–0 | Austria Wien | Madrid, Spain |
| 20:45 CET | Miranda 11'; García 25'; Filipe Luís 45'; Costa 82' | Report | Ramsebner (yellow card) 69'; Ortlechner (yellow card) 75' | Stadium: Vicente Calderón; Attendance: 29,841; Referee: István Vad (Hungary) |

| 26 November 2013 5 | Zenit Saint Petersburg (Russia) | 1–1 | (Spain) Atlético Madrid | Saint Petersburg, Russia |
| 18:00 CET | Alderweireld 74' (o.g.) | Report | Juanfran (yellow card) 30'; Adrián 53'; García (yellow card) 84' | Stadium: Petrovsky Stadium; Attendance: 17,885; Referee: Martin Atkinson (England) |

| 11 December 2013 6 | Atlético Madrid (Spain) | 2–0 | (Portugal) Porto | Madrid, Spain |
| 20:45 CET | García 14'; Aranzubia (yellow card) 27'; Costa 37'; Alderweireld (yellow card) 54'; Insúa (yellow card) 66' | Report | Josué (yellow card) 6'; González (yellow card) 31'; Defour (yellow card) 37'; Martínez (yellow card) 41'; Mangala (yellow card) 78' | Stadium: Vicente Calderón; Attendance: 24,629; Referee: Deniz Aytekin (Germany) |

==== Knockout phase ====
===== Round of 16 =====
| 19 February 2014 First leg | Milan (Italy) | 0–1 | (Spain) Atlético Madrid | Milan, Italy |
| 20:45 CET | Abate (yellow card) 44'; Bonera (yellow card) 61'; Rami (yellow card) 90+1' | Report | Insúa (yellow card) 20'; Suárez (yellow card) 41'; Costa (yellow card) 69', (goal) 83'; Adrián (yellow card) 90+3' | Stadium: San Siro; Referee: Pedro Proença (Portugal) |

| 11 March 2014 Second leg | Atlético Madrid (Spain) | 4–1 (5–1 agg.) | (Italy) Milan | Madrid, Spain |
| 20:45 CET | Costa 3', 85'; García (yellow card) 5', (goal) 71'; Turan 40' | Report | Rami (yellow card) 7'; Kaká 27'; Balotelli (yellow card) 45+2'; Bonera (yellow card) 70'; Robinho (yellow card) 74' | Stadium: Vicente Calderón; Attendance: 49,186; Referee: Mark Clattenburg (England) |

===== Quarter-finals =====
| 1 April 2014 First leg | Barcelona (Spain) | 1–1 | (Spain) Atlético Madrid | Barcelona, Spain |
| 20:45 CEST | Iniesta (yellow card) 56'; Alba (yellow card) 58'; Neymar 71' | Report | Koke (yellow card) 19'; Gabi (yellow card) 38'; Turan (yellow card) 44'; Juanfran (yellow card) 52'; Diego 56', (yellow card) 79'; Sosa (yellow card) 90+2' | Stadium: Camp Nou; Attendance: 79,941; Referee: Felix Brych (Germany) |

| 9 April 2014 Second leg | Atlético Madrid (Spain) | 1–0 (2–1 agg.) | (Spain) Barcelona | Madrid, Spain |
| 20:45 CEST | Koke 5', (yellow card) 90+1' | Report | Busquets (yellow card) 18'; Mascherano (yellow card) 90+2'; Dani Alves (yellow card) 90+3' | Stadium: Vicente Calderón; Attendance: 53,592; Referee: Howard Webb (England) |

===== Semi-finals =====
| 22 April 2014 First leg | Atlético Madrid (Spain) | 0–0 | (England) Chelsea | Madrid, Spain |
| 20:45 CEST | Gabi (yellow card) 75'; Miranda (yellow card) 89' | Report | Lampard (yellow card) 64'; Mikel (yellow card) 75'; Ba (yellow card) 90+4' | Stadium: Vicente Calderón; Attendance: 52,560; Referee: Jonas Eriksson (Sweden) |

| 30 April 2014 Second leg | Chelsea (England) | 1–3 (1–3 agg.) | (Spain) Atlético Madrid | London, England |
| 20:45 CEST | Cahill (yellow card) 31'; Torres 36' | Report | Adrián 44', (yellow card) 65'; Costa (yellow card) 60', (goal) 60' (pen.); Turan 72' | Stadium: Stamford Bridge; Attendance: 37,918; Referee: Nicola Rizzoli (Italy) |

===== Final =====
| 24 May 2014 Final | Real Madrid (Spain) | 4–1 (a.e.t.) | (Spain) Atlético Madrid | Lisbon, Portugal |
| 20:45 CEST (UTC+02:00) | Ramos (yellow card) 27', (goal) 90+3'; Khedira (yellow card) 45+1'; Bale 110'; Marcelo 118', (yellow card) 118'; Ronaldo 120' (pen.), (yellow card) 120+1'; Varane (yellow card) 120+3' | Report | García (yellow card) 27'; Godín 36', (yellow card) 120'; Miranda (yellow card) 53'; Villa (yellow card) 72'; Juanfran (yellow card) 74'; Koke (yellow card) 86'; Gabi (yellow card) 100' | Stadium: Estádio da Luz; Attendance: 60,976; Referee: Björn Kuipers (Netherlands) |

== Statistics ==
=== Appearances and goals ===
Last updated on 24 May 2014.

| No. | Pos | Nat | Player | Total | | La Liga | | Copa del Rey | | Supercopa de España | | Champions League | |
| No. | Pos | Nat | Player | Apps | Goals | Apps | Goals | Apps | Goals | Apps | Goals | Apps | Goals |
Goalkeepers
| 1 | GK | (Spain) ESP | Daniel Aranzubia | 5 | 0 | 1 | 0 | 3 | 0 | 0 | 0 | 1 | 0 |
| 13 | GK | (Belgium) BEL | Thibaut Courtois | 56 | 0 | 37 | 0 | 5 | 0 | 2 | 0 | 12 | 0 |
Defenders
| 2 | DF | (Uruguay) URU | Diego Godín | 51 | 8 | 34 | 4 | 5 | 2 | 2 | 0 | 10 | 2 |
| 3 | DF | (Brazil) BRA | Filipe Luis | 49 | 1 | 32 | 0 | 5 | 0 | 2 | 0 | 10 | 1 |
| 12 | DF | (Belgium) BEL | Toby Alderweireld | 22 | 2 | 10+2 | 1 | 5+1 | 1 | 0 | 0 | 3+1 | 0 |
| 18 | DF | (Uruguay) URU | José Giménez | 2 | 0 | 1 | 0 | 1 | 0 | 0 | 0 | 0 | 0 |
| 20 | DF | (Spain) ESP | Juanfran | 55 | 0 | 35 | 0 | 5+1 | 0 | 2 | 0 | 12 | 0 |
| 22 | DF | (Argentina) ARG | Emiliano Insúa | 14 | 0 | 5+1 | 0 | 3+1 | 0 | 0 | 0 | 3+1 | 0 |
| 23 | DF | (Brazil) BRA | Miranda | 52 | 4 | 32 | 2 | 5 | 0 | 2 | 0 | 13 | 2 |
| 26 | DF | (Spain) ESP | Javier Manquillo | 7 | 0 | 3 | 0 | 3 | 0 | 0 | 0 | 1 | 0 |
Midfielders
| 4 | MF | (Spain) ESP | Mario Suárez | 25 | 0 | 16+1 | 0 | 1 | 0 | 2 | 0 | 5 | 0 |
| 5 | MF | (Portugal) POR | Tiago | 33 | 2 | 21+2 | 2 | 2+1 | 0 | 0 | 0 | 7 | 0 |
| 6 | MF | (Spain) ESP | Koke | 58 | 6 | 33+3 | 5 | 6+1 | 0 | 2 | 0 | 12+1 | 1 |
| 8 | MF | (Spain) ESP | Raúl García | 53 | 18 | 18+16 | 10 | 7 | 4 | 0 | 0 | 10+2 | 4 |
| 10 | MF | (Turkey) TUR | Arda Turan | 46 | 9 | 22+8 | 3 | 3+2 | 2 | 2 | 0 | 7+2 | 4 |
| 11 | MF | (Uruguay) URU | Cristian Rodríguez | 39 | 1 | 2+18 | 1 | 4+3 | 0 | 0+2 | 0 | 1+9 | 0 |
| 14 | MF | (Spain) ESP | Gabi | 57 | 3 | 35+1 | 3 | 4+3 | 0 | 2 | 0 | 12 | 0 |
| 21 | MF | (Brazil) BRA | Diego Ribas | 19 | 2 | 4+9 | 1 | 2 | 0 | 0 | 0 | 1+3 | 1 |
| 24 | MF | (Argentina) ARG | José Sosa | 24 | 0 | 4+11 | 0 | 2+2 | 0 | 0 | 0 | 0+5 | 0 |
| 26 | MF | (Spain) ESP | Carlos Ramos | 1 | 0 | 0 | 0 | 1 | 0 | 0 | 0 | 0 | 0 |
Forwards
| 7 | FW | (Spain) ESP | Adrián López | 39 | 3 | 4+18 | 1 | 5+2 | 0 | 0+1 | 0 | 6+3 | 2 |
| 9 | FW | (Spain) ESP | David Villa | 47 | 15 | 32+4 | 13 | 0+2 | 1 | 2 | 1 | 5+2 | 0 |
| 19 | FW | (Spain) ESP | Diego Costa | 52 | 36 | 34+1 | 27 | 5+1 | 1 | 2 | 0 | 9 | 8 |
| 37 | FW | (Spain) ESP | Héctor Hernández | 1 | 1 | 0 | 0 | 0+1 | 1 | 0 | 0 | 0 | 0 |
Players who have made an appearance or had a squad number this season but have left the club
| 24 | DF | (Argentina) ARG | Martín Demichelis | 0 | 0 | 0 | 0 | 0 | 0 | 0 | 0 | 0 | 0 |
| 15 | MF | (France) FRA | Josuha Guilavogui | 7 | 0 | 0+1 | 0 | 3+1 | 0 | 0 | 0 | 1+1 | 0 |
| 16 | MF | (Spain) ESP | Óliver Torres | 14 | 1 | 2+5 | 1 | 2 | 0 | 0+1 | 0 | 1+3 | 0 |
| 21 | FW | (Brazil) BRA | Léo Baptistão | 12 | 1 | 1+4 | 0 | 1 | 0 | 0+2 | 0 | 3+1 | 1 |

=== Top scorers ===
| Rank | Position | Number | Player | La Liga | Supercopa de España | Copa del Rey | UEFA Champions League | Total |
|---|---|---|---|---|---|---|---|---|
| 1 | FW | 19 | (Spain) Diego Costa | 27 | 0 | 1 | 8 | 36 |
| 2 | MF | 8 | (Spain) Raúl García | 10 | 0 | 4 | 4 | 18 |
| 3 | FW | 9 | (Spain) David Villa | 13 | 1 | 1 | 0 | 15 |
| 4 | MF | 10 | (Turkey) Arda Turan | 3 | 0 | 2 | 4 | 9 |
| 5 | DF | 2 | (Uruguay) Diego Godín | 4 | 0 | 2 | 2 | 8 |
| 6 | MF | 6 | (Spain) Koke | 6 | 0 | 0 | 1 | 7 |
| 7 | DF | 23 | (Brazil) Miranda | 2 | 0 | 0 | 2 | 4 |
| 8 | FW | 7 | (Spain) Adrián | 1 | 0 | 0 | 2 | 3 |
| 8 | MF | 14 | (Spain) Gabi | 3 | 0 | 0 | 0 | 3 |
| 10 | MF | 5 | (Portugal) Tiago | 2 | 0 | 0 | 0 | 2 |
| 10 | DF | 12 | (Belgium) Toby Alderweireld | 1 | 0 | 1 | 0 | 2 |
| 10 | MF | 21 | (Brazil) Diego | 1 | 0 | 0 | 1 | 2 |
| 13 | DF | 3 | (Brazil) Filipe Luís | 0 | 0 | 0 | 1 | 1 |
| 13 | MF | 11 | (Uruguay) Cristian Rodríguez | 1 | 0 | 0 | 0 | 1 |
| 13 | MF | 16 | (Spain) Óliver^{1} | 1 | 0 | 0 | 0 | 1 |
| 13 | FW | 21 | (Brazil) Léo Baptistão^{1} | 0 | 0 | 0 | 1 | 1 |
| 13 | MF | 37 | (Spain) Héctor | 0 | 0 | 1 | 0 | 1 |
| Own goals | | | | 2 | 0 | 0 | 0 | 2 |
| TOTALS | | | | 77 | 1 | 12 | 26 | 116 |

^{1}Player left the club during the season.

Last updated: 30 April 2014
Competitive matches only
