= 2014 UEFA Champions League final =

Football match in Lisbon, Portugal

- Match programme cover
- Event: 2013–14 UEFA Champions League
Real Madrid	Atlético Madrid
(Spain)	(Spain)
4	1
- After extra time
- Date: 24 May 2014
- Venue: Estádio da Luz, Lisbon
- UEFA Man of the Match: Ángel Di María (Real Madrid)
- Fans' Man of the Match: Sergio Ramos (Real Madrid)
- Referee: Björn Kuipers (Netherlands)
- Attendance: 60,976
- Weather: Partly cloudy 17 °C (63 °F); 51% humidity

The 2014 UEFA Champions League final was the final match of the 2013–14 UEFA Champions League, the 59th season of Europe's premier club football tournament organised by UEFA, and the 22nd season since it was renamed from the European Champion Clubs' Cup to the UEFA Champions League.

The match took place on Saturday, 24 May 2014, at the Estádio da Luz in Lisbon, Portugal, between Spanish sides Real Madrid and Atlético Madrid. It was the fifth tournament final to feature two teams from the same association, the second all-Spanish final and the first between teams from the same city. Real Madrid won the match 4–1 after extra time, a wonder 93rd-minute header by Sergio Ramos, which cancelled out Diego Godín's first-half goal saved Real Madrid CF from defeat. In extra time with goals from Gareth Bale, Marcelo and Cristiano Ronaldo they won the Champions league. In doing so, Real Madrid secured a record 10th title (La Décima), 12 years after their ninth title.

As the winners, Real Madrid earned the right to play against 2013–14 UEFA Europa League winners Sevilla in the 2014 UEFA Super Cup. They also qualified to enter the semi-finals of the 2014 FIFA Club World Cup as the UEFA representative, ultimately triumphing in both competitions. The match is considered one of the greatest Champions League finals in history by the media.

== Venue ==
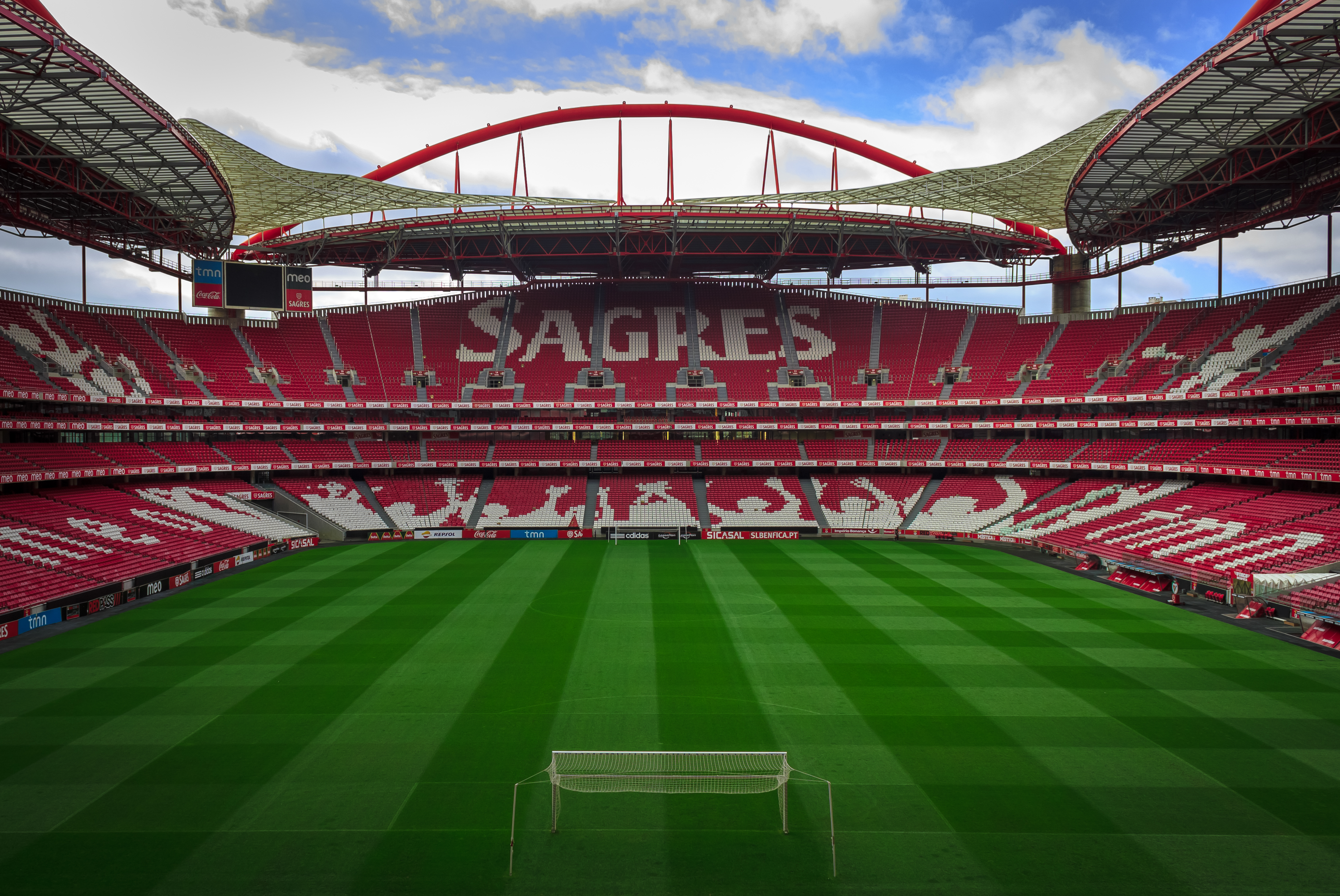
The Estádio da Luz hosted the European Cup/Champions League final for the first time.

The Estádio da Luz (officially known as the Estádio do Sport Lisboa e Benfica) in Lisbon, Portugal, was chosen as the venue of the 2014 UEFA Champions League final at a UEFA Executive Committee meeting in Istanbul, Turkey, on 20 March 2012.

The home stadium of Portuguese Primeira Liga side Benfica since 2003, it was newly built to host five matches of UEFA Euro 2004, including the final. Before the old stadium's demolition in 2003, to make way for the new 65,000-capacity ground, the original Estádio da Luz hosted the 1992 European Cup Winners' Cup final, where Werder Bremen beat Monaco 2–0, and the second leg of the 1983 UEFA Cup final, where Anderlecht secured a 1–1 draw with Benfica to lift the trophy.

The last time the European Cup final was played in Lisbon was in 1967, when Scottish side Celtic beat Inter Milan of Italy 2–1 at the Estádio Nacional. The Portuguese capital also hosted the 2005 UEFA Cup final at the Estádio José Alvalade, home of Benfica's local rivals and finalists Sporting CP, who lost 3–1 to CSKA Moscow.

== Background ==
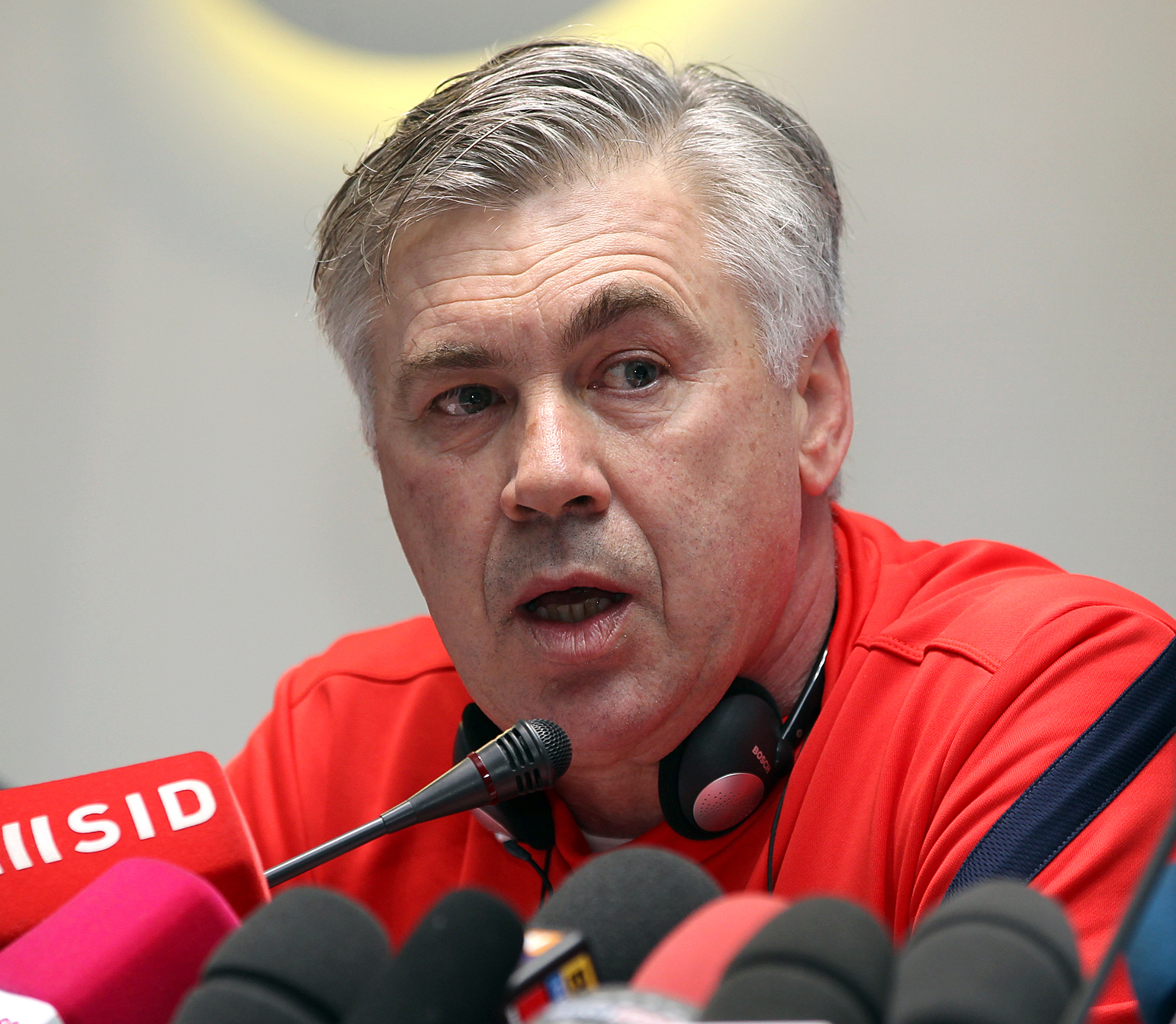
Carlo Ancelotti was managing in his fourth Champions League final, having won two of three previous finals with A.C. Milan.

This was the first final in the history of the competition to be disputed by two teams from the same city. It was also the second all-Spanish final, after the 2000 final between Real Madrid and Valencia, and the fifth final between teams from the same country, the others being 2003 (Italy), 2008 (England), and 2013 (Germany).

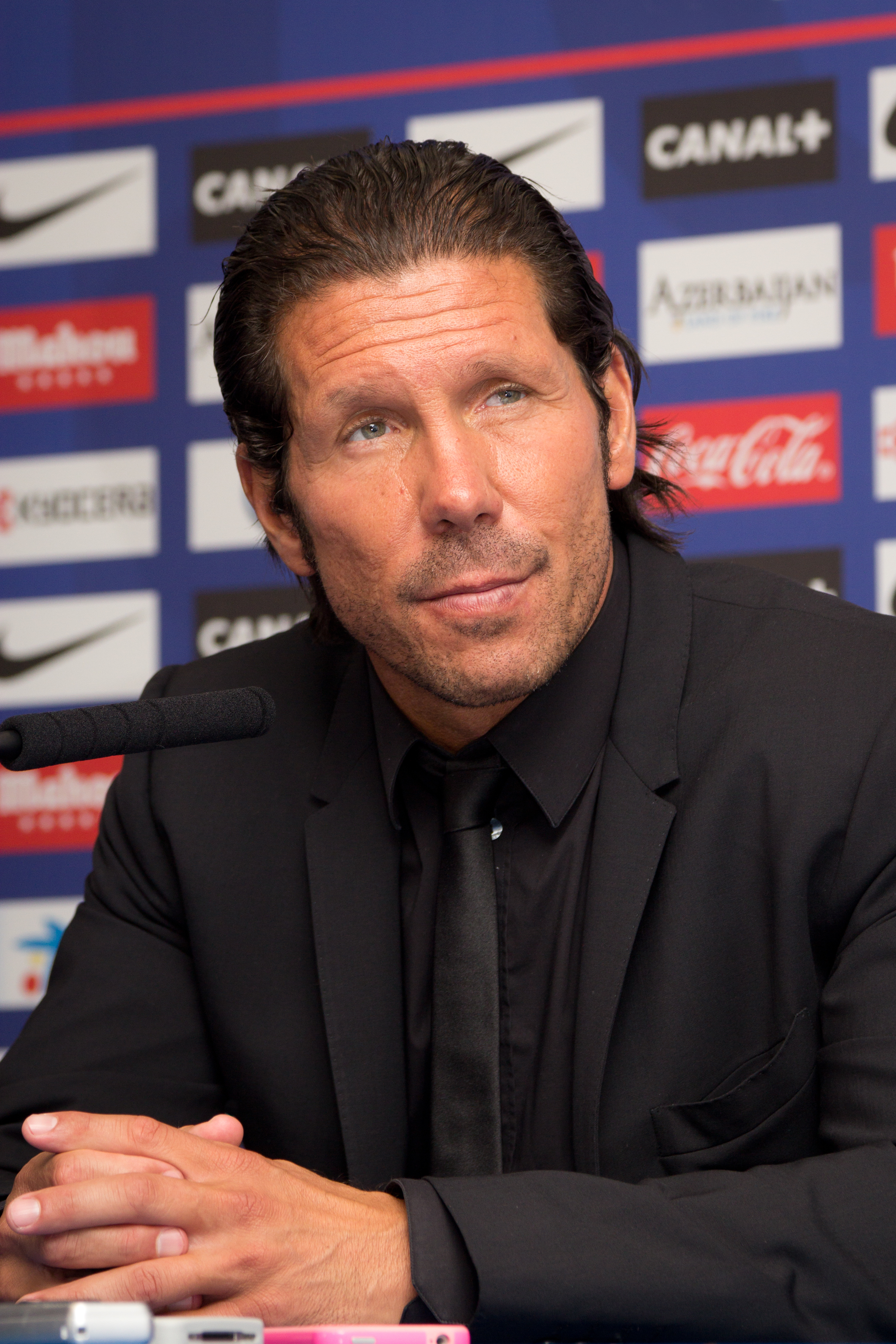
Diego Simeone reached his first UEFA Champions League final as a manager with Atlético Madrid.

Real Madrid reached a record 13th final after a 5–0 aggregate win against defending champions Bayern Munich, making it the first time the club had reached the final since they won their record ninth title in 2002. Previously they won finals in 1956, 1957, 1958, 1959, 1960, 1966, 1998, 2000, and 2002, and lost in 1962, 1964, and 1981. This was also their 17th final in all UEFA club competitions, having also played in two Cup Winners' Cup finals (losing in 1971 and 1983) and two UEFA Cup finals (winning in 1985 and 1986). It was the fourth Champions League final for their current coach Carlo Ancelotti, who previously coached A.C. Milan to victories in 2003 and 2007 and defeat in 2005, equalling the record shared by Miguel Muñoz, Marcello Lippi and Alex Ferguson. He joined Bob Paisley as the only manager to have won three titles, and also became the fifth manager to win titles with two clubs, after Ernst Happel, Ottmar Hitzfeld, José Mourinho and Jupp Heynckes.

Atlético Madrid, who a week earlier had won their first La Liga title since 1996, reached their second European Cup final, 40 years after their first, after defeating 2012 champions Chelsea 3–1 on aggregate. This was the longest wait between finals, eclipsing the 38-year wait by Inter Milan (1972–2010). Atlético Madrid's only previous European Cup final in 1974 ended in defeat to Bayern Munich after a replay. Atlético Madrid have also played in three Cup Winners' Cup finals (winning in 1962, and losing in 1963 and 1986) and two Europa League finals (winning in 2010 and 2012), with their most recent Europa League triumph in 2012 led by current coach Diego Simeone. He had the chance to join fellow Argentinians Luis Carniglia and Helenio Herrera as the only non-European coaches to win the European Cup/Champions League. Had they won the final, they would have become the first Spanish club and the fifth club overall to have won all three pre-1999 major European trophies (European Cup/Champions League, UEFA Cup/Europa League and the now-defunct Cup Winners' Cup).

The only previous Madrid derby matches in European competitions were in the 1958–59 European Cup semi-finals, where Real Madrid defeated Atlético Madrid 2–1 in a replay, after a 2–2 aggregate draw. In the 2013–14 season, Atlético Madrid defeated Real Madrid 1–0 away and drew 2–2 at home in La Liga, while Real Madrid eliminated Atlético Madrid in the Copa del Rey semi-finals, winning 3–0 at home and 2–0 away.

== Route to the final ==
Note: In all results below, the score of the finalist is given first (H: home; A: away).

(Spain) Real Madrid				Round	(Spain) Atlético Madrid			
Opponent	Result			Group stage	Opponent	Result		
(Turkey) Galatasaray	6–1 (A)			Matchday 1	(Russia) Zenit Saint Petersburg	3–1 (H)		
(Denmark) Copenhagen	4–0 (H)			Matchday 2	(Portugal) Porto	2–1 (A)		
(Italy) Juventus	2–1 (H)			Matchday 3	Austria Wien	3–0 (A)		
(Italy) Juventus	2–2 (A)			Matchday 4	Austria Wien	4–0 (H)		
(Turkey) Galatasaray	4–1 (H)			Matchday 5	(Russia) Zenit Saint Petersburg	1–1 (A)		
(Denmark) Copenhagen	2–0 (A)			Matchday 6	(Portugal) Porto	2–0 (H)		
Group B winners: Pos / Team / Pld / Pts; 1 / (Spain) Real Madrid / 6 / 16; 2 / (Turkey) Galatasaray / 6 / 7; 3 / (Italy) Juventus / 6 / 6; 4 / (Denmark) Copenhagen / 6 / 4; Source: UEFA				Final standings	Group G winners: Pos / Team / Pld / Pts; 1 / (Spain) Atlético Madrid / 6 / 16; 2 / (Russia) Zenit Saint Petersburg / 6 / 6; 3 / (Portugal) Porto / 6 / 5; 4 / Austria Wien / 6 / 5; Source: UEFA			
Opponent	Agg.	1st leg	2nd leg	Knockout phase	Opponent	Agg.	1st leg	2nd leg
(Germany) Schalke 04	9–2	6–1 (A)	3–1 (H)	Round of 16	(Italy) Milan	5–1	1–0 (A)	4–1 (H)
(Germany) Borussia Dortmund	3–2	3–0 (H)	0–2 (A)	Quarter-finals	(Spain) Barcelona	2–1	1–1 (A)	1–0 (H)
(Germany) Bayern Munich	5–0	1–0 (H)	4–0 (A)	Semi-finals	(England) Chelsea	3–1	0–0 (H)	3–1 (A)

== Pre-match ==
=== Ambassador ===
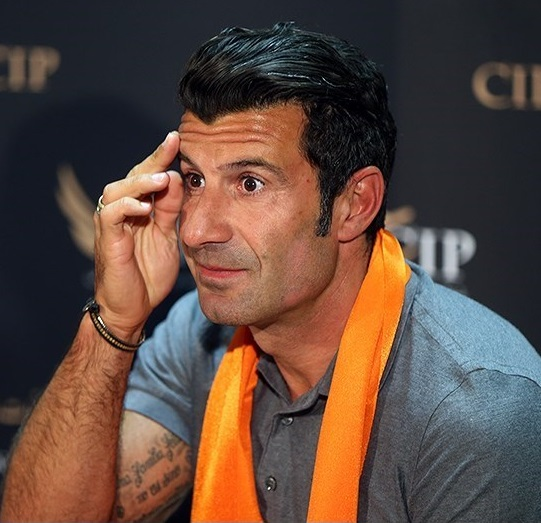
Luís Figo, ambassador of the 2014 UEFA Champions League final

Former Portugal international player Luís Figo, who won the Champions League with Real Madrid in 2002, was named as the ambassador for the final.

=== Logo ===
UEFA unveiled the visual identity of the final on 29 August 2013, the same day as the group stage draw. The design concept was inspired by elements from the Portuguese discoveries, namely the armillary sphere and the windrose, which were important instruments used by Portuguese sea explorers to measure the position of stars.

=== Ticketing ===
The international ticket sales phase for the general public ran from 10 to 21 March 2014. Tickets were available in four price categories: €390, €280, €160, and €70.

The two finalist clubs were each allocated 16,970 tickets by UEFA. Atlético made 14,000 tickets available to club members, with a limit of one ticket per member. Real Madrid received 24,103 requests from 73,314 club members for a total of 13,134 tickets; due to the high demand, the tickets were awarded by means of a draw.

=== Officials ===
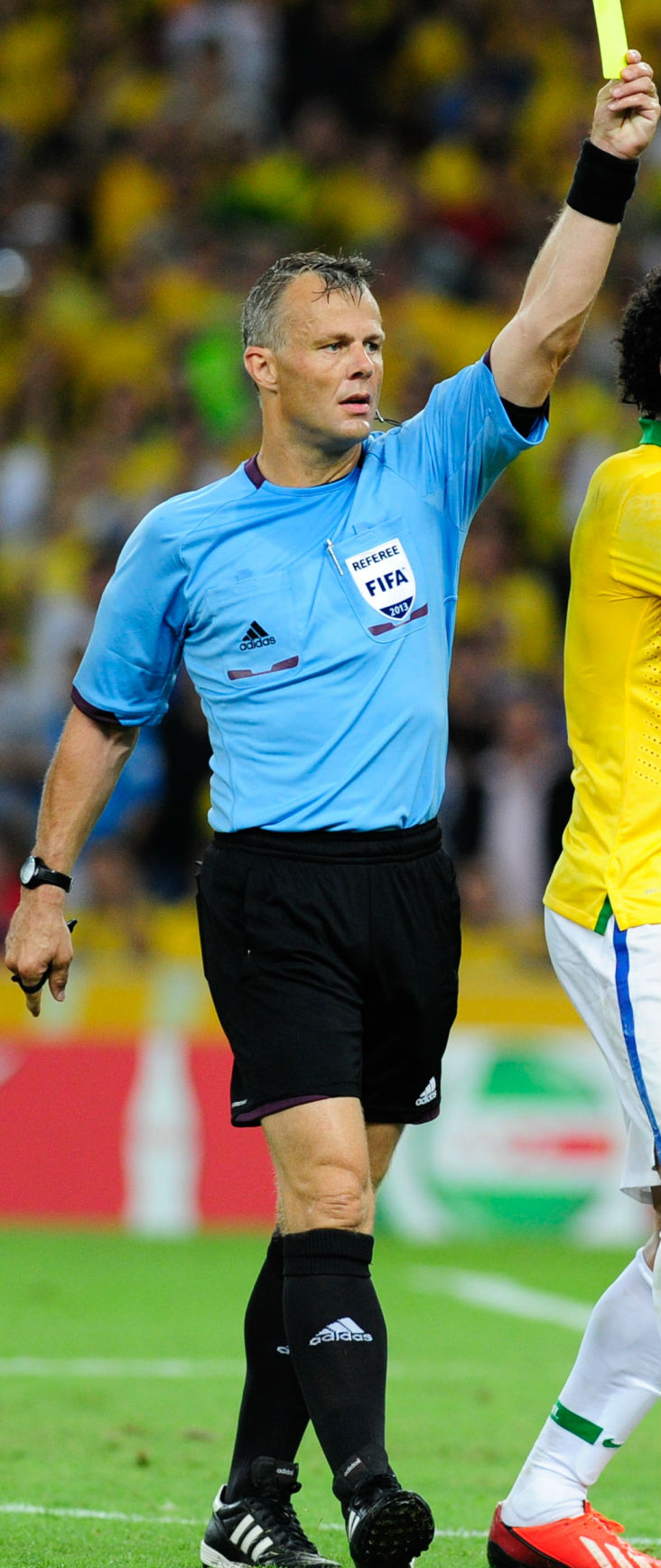
UEFA announced Björn Kuipers as the referee for the final on 7 May.

Dutch referee Björn Kuipers was named by UEFA on 7 May 2014 as the referee for the final. He has previously taken charge of the 2011 UEFA Super Cup, the 2013 UEFA Europa League final, and the 2013 FIFA Confederations Cup final. He became the fourth Dutch referee in a European Cup/Champions League final, after Leo Horn (1957, 1962), Charles Corver (1978), and Dick Jol (2001). The rest of the refereeing team are fellow countrymen Sander van Roekel and Erwin Zeinstra as assistant referees, Pol van Boekel and Richard Liesveld as additional assistant referees, Angelo Boonman as reserve assistant referee, and Turkey's Cüneyt Çakır as the fourth official.

=== Related events ===
The UEFA Champions League and UEFA Women's Champions League trophies were handed over to the host city of Lisbon at a ceremony held at the City Hall, on 17 April 2014. The Mayor of Lisbon António Costa received the silverware from the hands of UEFA President Michel Platini, who justified the decision to stage the 2014 UEFA Champions League showpiece match in Lisbon with the fact that it had "been too long since the final had been in Portugal" and for "the passion and love of football the Portuguese have." The title holders of both competitions were represented at the event by Bayern Munich chairman Karl-Heinz Rummenigge and midfielder Xherdan Shaqiri, and Wolfsburg defender Lina Magull. Also in attendance were Portuguese Football Federation (FPF) President Fernando Gomes and final ambassador Luís Figo. Upon their arrival to Lisbon and before the ceremony, the trophies were paraded by old tram through the city in the hands of trophy tour ambassadors Vítor Baía, former Portuguese international and Porto goalkeeper, and Mónica Jorge, former coach of the women's national team.

The annual UEFA Champions Festival took place from 22 to 25 May 2014 at Praça do Comércio in the city centre.

The 2014 UEFA Women's Champions League final was held on 22 May 2014 at Estádio do Restelo, featuring Swedish side Tyresö and defending champions Wolfsburg. Losing 2–0 at half-time, Wolfsburg made a comeback to win the match 4–3. Martina Müller, who scored the winner in the previous final, repeated the feat to secure the German team's second consecutive title.

=== Opening ceremony ===
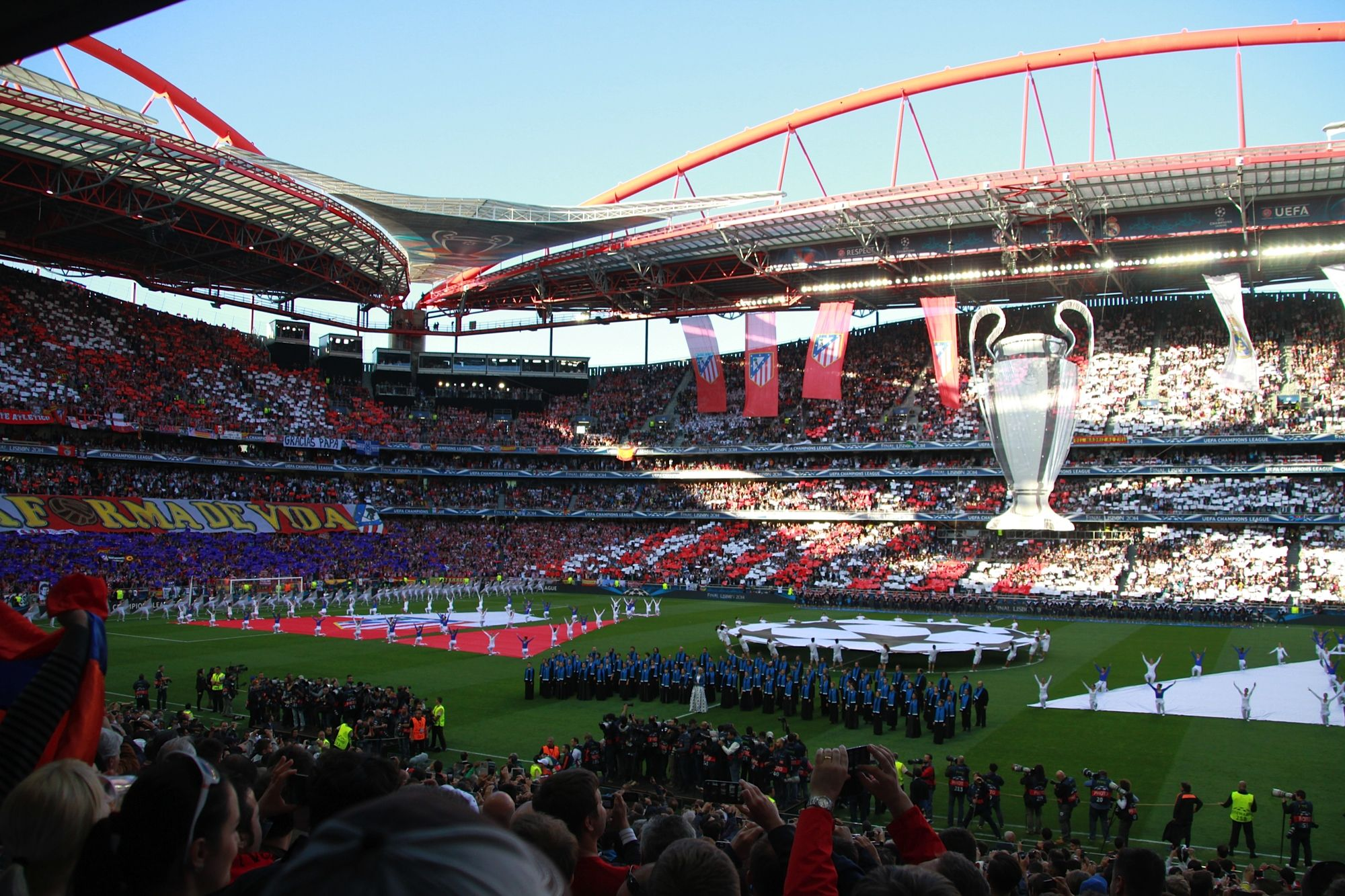
Opening ceremony

The ceremony preceding the kick-off was organised by Canadian company Circo de Bakuza, with artistic direction by London-based choreographer Wanda Rokicki. She was responsible for the artistic segments of large international sporting events, such as the 2004 Summer Olympics, the 2010 FIFA World Cup, and the 2002 and 2006 Commonwealth Games. Conceived "to honor Portuguese tradition, including naval history or the art of tiling", the show required six months of preparation and involved a total of 400 volunteers, 90 singers and 84 large-sized banners. The UEFA Champions League anthem was interpreted by Portuguese fado singer Mariza.

== Match ==
=== Team selection ===
The only player suspended from the final was Real Madrid's Xabi Alonso, who picked up his third booking of the competition in the second leg of the semi-final. In his place, Carlo Ancelotti selected German midfielder Sami Khedira, who himself had only recently returned from injury. Pepe was also left out of the starting XI, with 21-year-old French centre-back Raphaël Varane playing instead. Real Madrid's front three of Cristiano Ronaldo, Gareth Bale and Karim Benzema were originally doubtful for the match, but all three overcame injuries to start the match.

Atlético captain Gabi returned from a one-match European suspension, while striker Diego Costa was included in the starting line-up, having undergone horse placenta treatment for a hamstring injury suffered in the last league match the previous Saturday. However, despite initial optimism, key player Arda Turan did not recover in time after suffering an injury in the same game.

=== Kits ===
Atlético Madrid wore shirts with the name of their former player and manager Luis Aragonés inside the collar following his death in February 2014, with the symbolism approved by UEFA President Michel Platini. Both teams wore their home kits for the final, as they do in domestic meetings.

=== Summary ===
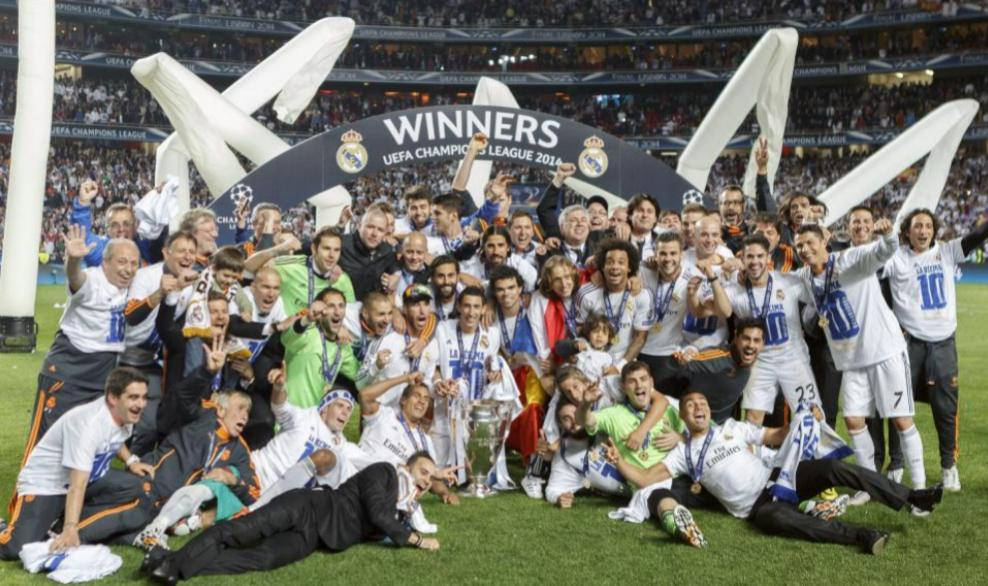
Real Madrid celebrating the victory

Within eight minutes, Atlético striker Diego Costa was forced to come off because of his previous injury. Gareth Bale had Real's best chance just after the half-hour mark and it was only a few minutes later when Atlético punished this miss. When Atlético received a corner, it was routinely cleared by the Real Madrid defence, but only as far as the head of Juanfran, who headed the ball back into the penalty area and onto the head of Diego Godín, who caught Iker Casillas off his line with a looping header to make it 1–0 to Atlético on 36 minutes.

The second half saw Real pushing forward as they went in search of an equaliser to deny Atlético's first Champions League title, with manager Carlo Ancelotti making a double substitution to replace Fábio Coentrão and Khedira with Marcelo and Isco. Atlético defended with all players and Real missed several chances. Atletico's defence was finally breached in the third minute of stoppage time, after the regulation 90 minutes, by a pinpoint Sergio Ramos header into the left of the net from Luka Modrić's corner from the right. The match went on to extra time with no substitutions left for either team.

Real Madrid became even more dominant in extra time, which proved decisive after Ángel Di María's run on the left flank saw him dribble past three Atlético defenders and shoot at goal. Thibaut Courtois attempted to block the Argentine's shot but only managed to deflect the ball to Bale, who headed the rebound in from two yards out to put Real ahead for the first time, in the 110th minute. Real then added two late goals to the scoreline. Cristiano Ronaldo squared the ball to Marcelo, who scored with his left foot from inside the penalty area in the 118th minute. At the end of extra time, Ronaldo was fouled by Gabi for a penalty, which he converted into the left corner of the net for a record 17th goal in the tournament. Ronaldo became one of the few players to score and assist in a Champions League final. During the celebration for Ronaldo's goal, Varane kicked the ball towards Atlético manager Diego Simeone, who then ran onto the pitch in anger. Simeone was sent off and Varane booked for the incident.

This was the seventh UEFA Champions League final (not including the finals up to 1992, when it was known as the European Champion Clubs' Cup) to go into extra time and the first to be solved during this period, without the need for a penalty shoot-out. It was also the second highest-scoring final in the tournament's history as the Champions League, after the 3–3 draw between Milan and Liverpool in 2005, and provided the second biggest winning margin, behind Milan's 4–0 win over Barcelona in 1994.

=== Details ===
24 May 2014
19:45 UTC+1

Real Madrid (Spain)	4–1 (a.e.t.)	(Spain) Atlético Madrid
Ramos 90+3'; Bale 110'; Marcelo 118'; Ronaldo 120' (pen.)	Report	Godín 36'

Estádio da Luz, Lisbon
Attendance: 60,976
Referee: Björn Kuipers (Netherlands)

Real Madrid	Atlético Madrid

GK	1	(Spain) Iker Casillas (c)
RB	15	(Spain) Dani Carvajal
CB	2	(France) Raphaël Varane	(yellow card) 120+3'
CB	4	(Spain) Sergio Ramos	(yellow card) 27'
LB	5	(Portugal) Fábio Coentrão		(substituted off) 59'
RM	19	(Croatia) Luka Modrić
CM	6	(Germany) Sami Khedira	(yellow card) 45+1'	(substituted off) 59'
LM	22	(Argentina) Ángel Di María
RF	11	(Wales) Gareth Bale
CF	9	(France) Karim Benzema		(substituted off) 79'
LF	7	(Portugal) Cristiano Ronaldo	(yellow card) 120+1'
Substitutes:
GK	25	(Spain) Diego López
DF	3	(Portugal) Pepe
DF	12	(Brazil) Marcelo	(yellow card) 118'	(substituted on) 59'
DF	17	(Spain) Álvaro Arbeloa
MF	23	(Spain) Isco		(substituted on) 59'
MF	24	(Spain) Asier Illarramendi
FW	21	(Spain) Álvaro Morata		(substituted on) 79'
Manager:
(Italy) Carlo Ancelotti

GK	13	(Belgium) Thibaut Courtois
RB	20	(Spain) Juanfran	(yellow card) 74'
CB	23	(Brazil) Miranda	(yellow card) 53'
CB	2	(Uruguay) Diego Godín	(yellow card) 120'
LB	3	(Brazil) Filipe Luís		(substituted off) 83'
RM	8	(Spain) Raúl García	(yellow card) 27'	(substituted off) 66'
CM	5	(Portugal) Tiago
CM	14	(Spain) Gabi (c)	(yellow card) 100'
LM	6	(Spain) Koke	(yellow card) 86'
CF	19	(Spain) Diego Costa		(substituted off) 9'
CF	9	(Spain) David Villa	(yellow card) 72'
Substitutes:
GK	1	(Spain) Dani Aranzubia
DF	12	(Belgium) Toby Alderweireld		(substituted on) 83'
MF	4	(Spain) Mario Suárez
MF	11	(Uruguay) Cristian Rodríguez
MF	24	(Argentina) José Sosa		(substituted on) 66'
MF	26	(Brazil) Diego
FW	7	(Spain) Adrián		(substituted on) 9'
Manager:
(Argentina) Diego Simeone (Note: Simeone was expelled by the referee in the 120+3rd minute.)

UEFA Man of the Match:
Ángel Di María (Real Madrid)
Fans' Man of the Match:
Sergio Ramos (Real Madrid)

Assistant referees:
Sander van Roekel (Netherlands)
Erwin Zeinstra (Netherlands)
Fourth official:
Cüneyt Çakır (Turkey)
Additional assistant referees:
Pol van Boekel (Netherlands)
Richard Liesveld (Netherlands)
Reserve assistant referee:
Angelo Boonman (Netherlands)

Match rules

- 90 minutes
- 30 minutes of extra time if necessary
- Penalty shoot-out if scores still level
- Seven named substitutes, of which three may be used

=== Statistics ===
First half
Statistic	Real Madrid	Atlético Madrid
Goals scored	0	1
Total shots	3	4
Shots on target	2	2
Saves	0	2
Ball possession	57%	43%
Corner kicks	2	3
Fouls committed	8	10
Offsides	0	2
Yellow cards	2	1
Red cards	0	0

Second half
Statistic	Real Madrid	Atlético Madrid
Goals scored	1	0
Total shots	10	3
Shots on target	3	2
Saves	1	1
Ball possession	61%	39%
Corner kicks	5	5
Fouls committed	6	11
Offsides	0	2
Yellow cards	0	4
Red cards	0	0

Extra time
Statistic	Real Madrid	Atlético Madrid
Goals scored	3	0
Total shots	8	3
Shots on target	7	2
Saves	2	3
Ball possession	65%	35%
Corner kicks	2	1
Fouls committed	5	6
Offsides	0	0
Yellow cards	3	2
Red cards	0	0

Overall
Statistic	Real Madrid	Atlético Madrid
Goals scored	4	1
Total shots	21	10
Shots on target	12	6
Saves	3	6
Ball possession	61%	39%
Corner kicks	9	9
Fouls committed	19	27
Offsides	0	4
Yellow cards	5	7
Red cards	0	0

== See also ==
- 2016 UEFA Champions League final – contested by same teams
- 2018 UEFA Super Cup – contested by same teams
- 2014 UEFA Europa League final
- 2013–14 Atlético Madrid season
- 2013–14 Real Madrid CF season
- Atlético Madrid in European football
- Real Madrid CF in international football
- Spanish football clubs in international competitions
