= 2013–14 UEFA Champions League knockout phase =

International football competition

The knockout phase of the 2013–14 UEFA Champions League began on 18 February and concluded on 24 May 2014 with the final at Estádio da Luz in Lisbon, Portugal. A total of 16 teams competed in the knockout phase.

Times are CET/CEST, (Note: CET (UTC+1) for matches to 19 March 2014, and CEST (UTC+2) for matches from 1 April 2014.) as listed by UEFA (local times, if different, are in parentheses).

== Round and draw dates ==
All draws were held at UEFA headquarters in Nyon, Switzerland.

Round	Draw date and time	First leg	Second leg
Round of 16	16 December 2013, 12:00	18–19 & 25–26 February 2014	11–12 & 18–19 March 2014
Quarter-finals	21 March 2014, 12:00	1–2 April 2014	8–9 April 2014
Semi-finals	11 April 2014, 12:00	22–23 April 2014	29–30 April 2014
Final	11 April 2014, 12:00	24 May 2014 at Estádio da Luz, Lisbon	

== Format ==
The knockout phase involved the 16 teams which qualified as winners and runners-up of each of the eight groups in the group stage.

Each tie in the knockout phase, apart from the final, was played over two legs, with each team playing one leg at home. The team that scored more goals on aggregate over the two legs advanced to the next round. If the aggregate score was level, the away goals rule was applied, i.e., the team that scored more goals away from home over the two legs advanced. If away goals were also equal, then 30 minutes of extra time were played. The away goals rule was again applied after extra time, i.e., if there were goals scored during extra time and the aggregate score was still level, the visiting team advanced by virtue of more away goals scored. If no goals were scored during extra time, the tie was decided by penalty shoot-out. In the final, which was played as a single match, if scores were level at the end of normal time, extra time was played, followed by penalty shoot-out if scores remained tied.

The mechanism of the draws for each round was as follows:

- In the draw for the round of 16, the eight group winners were seeded, and the eight group runners-up were unseeded. The seeded teams were drawn against the unseeded teams, with the seeded teams hosting the second leg. Teams from the same group or the same association could not be drawn against each other.
- In the draws for the quarter-finals onwards, there were no seedings, and teams from the same group or the same association could be drawn against each other.

== Qualified teams ==
Group	Winners (Seeded in round of 16 draw)	Runners-up (Unseeded in round of 16 draw)
A	(England) Manchester United	(Germany) Bayer Leverkusen
B	(Spain) Real Madrid	(Turkey) Galatasaray
C	(France) Paris Saint-Germain	(Greece) Olympiacos
D	(Germany) Bayern Munich	(England) Manchester City
E	(England) Chelsea	(Germany) Schalke 04
F	(Germany) Borussia Dortmund	(England) Arsenal
G	(Spain) Atlético Madrid	(Russia) Zenit Saint Petersburg
H	(Spain) Barcelona	(Italy) Milan

== Bracket ==
Round of 16
(Germany) Schalke 04	1	1	2
(Spain) Real Madrid	6	3	9
(Russia) Zenit Saint Petersburg	2	2	4
(Germany) Borussia Dortmund	4	1	5
(Greece) Olympiacos	2	0	2
(England) Manchester United	0	3	3
(England) Arsenal	0	1	1
(Germany) Bayern Munich	2	1	3
(England) Manchester City	0	1	1
(Spain) Barcelona	2	2	4
(Italy) Milan	0	1	1
(Spain) Atlético Madrid	1	4	5
(Germany) Bayer Leverkusen	0	1	1
(France) Paris Saint-Germain	4	2	6
(Turkey) Galatasaray	1	0	1
(England) Chelsea	1	2	3

Quarter-finals
(Spain) Real Madrid	3	0	3
(Germany) Borussia Dortmund	0	2	2
(England) Manchester United	1	1	2
(Germany) Bayern Munich	1	3	4
(Spain) Barcelona	1	0	1
(Spain) Atlético Madrid	1	1	2
(France) Paris Saint-Germain	3	0	3
(England) Chelsea (a)	1	2	3

Semi-finals
(Spain) Real Madrid	1	4	5
(Germany) Bayern Munich	0	0	0
(Spain) Atlético Madrid	0	3	3
(England) Chelsea	0	1	1

Final
24 May – Lisbon
(Spain) Real Madrid (a.e.t.)	4
(Spain) Atlético Madrid	1

== Round of 16 ==
=== Summary ===
The draw for the round of 16 was held on 16 December 2013. The first legs were played on 18, 19, 25 and 26 February, and the second legs were played on 11, 12, 18 and 19 March 2014.

Team 1	Agg.	Team 2	1st leg	2nd leg
Manchester City (England)	1–4	(Spain) Barcelona	0–2	1–2
Olympiacos (Greece)	2–3	(England) Manchester United	2–0	0–3
Milan (Italy)	1–5	(Spain) Atlético Madrid	0–1	1–4
Bayer Leverkusen (Germany)	1–6	(France) Paris Saint-Germain	0–4	1–2
Galatasaray (Turkey)	1–3	(England) Chelsea	1–1	0–2
Schalke 04 (Germany)	2–9	(Spain) Real Madrid	1–6	1–3
Zenit Saint Petersburg (Russia)	4–5	(Germany) Borussia Dortmund	2–4	2–1
Arsenal (England)	1–3	(Germany) Bayern Munich	0–2	1–1

=== Matches ===
18 February 2014
20:45 (19:45 UTC+0)

Manchester City (England)	0–2	(Spain) Barcelona
	Report	Messi 54' (pen.); Dani Alves 90'

City of Manchester Stadium, Manchester
Attendance: 46,033
Referee: Jonas Eriksson (Sweden)
12 March 2014
20:45

Barcelona (Spain)	2–1	(England) Manchester City
Messi 67'; Dani Alves 90+1'	Report	Kompany 89'

Camp Nou, Barcelona
Attendance: 85,957
Referee: Stéphane Lannoy (France)

Barcelona won 4–1 on aggregate.

25 February 2014
20:45 (21:45 UTC+2)

Olympiacos (Greece)	2–0	(England) Manchester United
Domínguez 38'; Campbell 55'	Report

Karaiskakis Stadium, Piraeus
Attendance: 29,815
Referee: Gianluca Rocchi (Italy)
19 March 2014
20:45 (19:45 UTC+0)

Manchester United (England)	3–0	(Greece) Olympiacos
Van Persie 25' (pen.), 45+1', 52'	Report

Old Trafford, Manchester
Attendance: 74,662
Referee: Björn Kuipers (Netherlands)

Manchester United won 3–2 on aggregate.

19 February 2014
20:45

Milan (Italy)	0–1	(Spain) Atlético Madrid
	Report	Costa 83'

San Siro, Milan
Attendance: 65,890
Referee: Pedro Proença (Portugal)
11 March 2014
20:45

Atlético Madrid (Spain)	4–1	(Italy) Milan
Costa 3', 85'; Turan 40'; García 71'	Report	Kaká 27'

Vicente Calderón, Madrid
Attendance: 49,186
Referee: Mark Clattenburg (England)

Atlético Madrid won 5–1 on aggregate.

18 February 2014
20:45

Bayer Leverkusen (Germany)	0–4	(France) Paris Saint-Germain
	Report	Matuidi 3'; Ibrahimović 39' (pen.), 42'; Cabaye 88'

BayArena, Leverkusen
Attendance: 29,412
Referee: Viktor Kassai (Hungary)
12 March 2014
20:45

Paris Saint-Germain (France)	2–1	(Germany) Bayer Leverkusen
Marquinhos 13'; Lavezzi 53'	Report	Sam 6'

Parc des Princes, Paris
Attendance: 45,596
Referee: Ivan Bebek (Croatia)

Paris Saint-Germain won 6–1 on aggregate.

26 February 2014
20:45 (21:45 UTC+2)

Galatasaray (Turkey)	1–1	(England) Chelsea
Chedjou 65'	Report	Torres 9'

Türk Telekom Arena, Istanbul
Attendance: 49,194
Referee: Carlos Velasco Carballo (Spain)
18 March 2014
20:45 (19:45 UTC+0)

Chelsea (England)	2–0	(Turkey) Galatasaray
Eto'o 4'; Cahill 42'	Report

Stamford Bridge, London
Attendance: 38,038
Referee: Felix Brych (Germany)

Chelsea won 3–1 on aggregate.

26 February 2014
20:45

Schalke 04 (Germany)	1–6	(Spain) Real Madrid
Huntelaar 90+1'	Report	Benzema 13', 57'; Bale 21', 69'; Ronaldo 52', 89'

Arena AufSchalke, Gelsenkirchen
Attendance: 54,442
Referee: Howard Webb (England)
18 March 2014
20:45

Real Madrid (Spain)	3–1	(Germany) Schalke 04
Ronaldo 21', 73'; Morata 75'	Report	Hoogland 31'

Santiago Bernabéu, Madrid
Attendance: 65,148
Referee: Sergei Karasev (Russia)

Real Madrid won 9–2 on aggregate.

25 February 2014
18:00 (21:00 UTC+4)

Zenit Saint Petersburg (Russia)	2–4	(Germany) Borussia Dortmund
Shatov 57'; Hulk 69' (pen.)	Report	Mkhitaryan 4'; Reus 5'; Lewandowski 61', 71'

Petrovsky Stadium, Saint Petersburg
Attendance: 15,099
Referee: William Collum (Scotland)
19 March 2014
20:45

Borussia Dortmund (Germany)	1–2	(Russia) Zenit Saint Petersburg
Kehl 38'	Report	Hulk 16'; Rondón 73'

Westfalenstadion, Dortmund
Attendance: 65,829
Referee: Alberto Undiano Mallenco (Spain)

Borussia Dortmund won 5–4 on aggregate.

19 February 2014
20:45 (19:45 UTC+0)

Arsenal (England)	0–2	(Germany) Bayern Munich
	Report	Kroos 54'; Müller 88'

Emirates Stadium, London
Attendance: 59,911
Referee: Nicola Rizzoli (Italy)
11 March 2014
20:45

Bayern Munich (Germany)	1–1	(England) Arsenal
Schweinsteiger 55'	Report	Podolski 57'

Allianz Arena, Munich
Attendance: 68,000
Referee: Svein Oddvar Moen (Norway)

Bayern Munich won 3–1 on aggregate.

== Quarter-finals ==
=== Summary ===
The draw for the quarter-finals was held on 21 March 2014. The first legs were played on 1 and 2 April, and the second legs were played on 8 and 9 April 2014.

Team 1	Agg.	Team 2	1st leg	2nd leg
Barcelona (Spain)	1–2	(Spain) Atlético Madrid	1–1	0–1
Real Madrid (Spain)	3–2	(Germany) Borussia Dortmund	3–0	0–2
Paris Saint-Germain (France)	3–3 (a)	(England) Chelsea	3–1	0–2
Manchester United (England)	2–4	(Germany) Bayern Munich	1–1	1–3

=== Matches ===
1 April 2014
20:45

Barcelona (Spain)	1–1	(Spain) Atlético Madrid
Neymar 71'	Report	Diego 56'

Camp Nou, Barcelona
Attendance: 79,941
Referee: Felix Brych (Germany)
9 April 2014
20:45

Atlético Madrid (Spain)	1–0	(Spain) Barcelona
Koke 5'	Report

Vicente Calderón, Madrid
Attendance: 53,592
Referee: Howard Webb (England)

Atlético Madrid won 2–1 on aggregate.

2 April 2014
20:45

Real Madrid (Spain)	3–0	(Germany) Borussia Dortmund
Bale 3'; Isco 27'; Ronaldo 57'	Report

Santiago Bernabéu, Madrid
Attendance: 70,089
Referee: Mark Clattenburg (England)
8 April 2014
20:45

Borussia Dortmund (Germany)	2–0	(Spain) Real Madrid
Reus 24', 37'	Report

Westfalenstadion, Dortmund
Attendance: 65,829
Referee: Damir Skomina (Slovenia)

Real Madrid won 3–2 on aggregate.

2 April 2014
20:45

Paris Saint-Germain (France)	3–1	(England) Chelsea
Lavezzi 4'; David Luiz 61' (o.g.); Pastore 90+3'	Report	Hazard 27' (pen.)

Parc des Princes, Paris
Attendance: 45,517
Referee: Milorad Mažić (Serbia)
8 April 2014
20:45 (19:45 UTC+1)

Chelsea (England)	2–0	(France) Paris Saint-Germain
Schürrle 32'; Ba 87'	Report

Stamford Bridge, London
Attendance: 38,080
Referee: Pedro Proença (Portugal)

3–3 on aggregate; Chelsea won on away goals.

1 April 2014
20:45 (19:45 UTC+1)

Manchester United (England)	1–1	(Germany) Bayern Munich
Vidić 58'	Report	Schweinsteiger 67'

Old Trafford, Manchester
Attendance: 75,199
Referee: Carlos Velasco Carballo (Spain)
9 April 2014
20:45

Bayern Munich (Germany)	3–1	(England) Manchester United
Mandžukić 59'; Müller 68'; Robben 76'	Report	Evra 57'

Allianz Arena, Munich
Attendance: 67,300
Referee: Jonas Eriksson (Sweden)

Bayern Munich won 4–2 on aggregate.

== Semi-finals ==
=== Summary ===
The draw for the semi-finals was held on 11 April 2014. The first legs were played on 22 and 23 April, and the second legs were played on 29 and 30 April 2014.

Team 1	Agg.	Team 2	1st leg	2nd leg
Real Madrid (Spain)	5–0	(Germany) Bayern Munich	1–0	4–0
Atlético Madrid (Spain)	3–1	(England) Chelsea	0–0	3–1

=== Matches ===
23 April 2014
20:45

Real Madrid (Spain)	1–0	(Germany) Bayern Munich
Benzema 19'	Report

Santiago Bernabéu, Madrid
Attendance: 79,283
Referee: Howard Webb (England)
29 April 2014
20:45

Bayern Munich (Germany)	0–4	(Spain) Real Madrid
	Report	Ramos 16', 20'; Ronaldo 34', 90'

Allianz Arena, Munich
Attendance: 68,000
Referee: Pedro Proença (Portugal)

Real Madrid won 5–0 on aggregate.

22 April 2014
20:45

Atlético Madrid (Spain)	0–0	(England) Chelsea
	Report

Vicente Calderón, Madrid
Attendance: 52,560
Referee: Jonas Eriksson (Sweden)
30 April 2014
20:45 (19:45 UTC+1)

Chelsea (England)	1–3	(Spain) Atlético Madrid
Torres 36'	Report	Adrián 44'; Costa 60' (pen.); Turan 72'

Stamford Bridge, London
Attendance: 37,918
Referee: Nicola Rizzoli (Italy)

Atlético Madrid won 3–1 on aggregate.

== Final ==
The final was played on 24 May 2014 at the Estádio da Luz in Lisbon, Portugal. A draw was held on 11 April 2014, after the semi-final draw, to determine the "home" team for administrative purposes.

24 May 2014
20:45 (19:45 UTC+1)

Real Madrid (Spain)	4–1 (a.e.t.)	(Spain) Atlético Madrid
Ramos 90+3'; Bale 110'; Marcelo 118'; Ronaldo 120' (pen.)	Report	Godín 36'

Estádio da Luz, Lisbon
Attendance: 60,976
Referee: Björn Kuipers (Netherlands)
