= 2013–14 UEFA Champions League group stage =

The group stage of the 2013–14 UEFA Champions League was played from 17 September to 11 December 2013. A total of 32 teams competed in the group stage.

== Draw ==
The draw was held on 29 August 2013, 17:45 CEST (UTC+2), at the Grimaldi Forum, Monaco. The 32 teams were allocated into four pots based on their UEFA club coefficients at the beginning of the season, with the title holders being placed in Pot 1 automatically. They were drawn into eight groups of four containing one team from each of the four seeding pots, with the restriction that teams from the same national association could not be drawn against each other. Moreover, the draw was controlled for teams from the same association in order to split the teams evenly into the two sets of groups (A–D, E–H) for maximum television coverage.

The fixtures were decided after the draw. On each matchday, four groups played their matches on Tuesday, while the other four groups played their matches on Wednesday, with the two sets of groups (A–D, E–H) alternating between each matchday. There were other restrictions, e.g., teams from the same city (e.g., Chelsea and Arsenal, Manchester United and Manchester City, Real Madrid and Atlético Madrid) in general did not play at home on the same matchday (UEFA tried to avoid teams from the same city playing at home on the same day or on consecutive days), and Russian teams did not play at home on the last matchday due to cold weather.

== Teams ==
Below were the 32 teams which qualified for the group stage (with their 2013 UEFA club coefficients), grouped by their seeding pot. They included 22 teams which entered in this stage, and the 10 winners of the play-off round (5 in Champions Route, 5 in League Route).

Key to colours in group tables
Group winners and runners-up advanced to the round of 16
Third-placed teams entered the Europa League round of 32

Pot 1
Team	Notes	Coeff.
(Germany) Bayern Munich		146.922
(Spain) Barcelona		157.605
(England) Chelsea		137.592
(Spain) Real Madrid		136.605
(England) Manchester United		130.592
(England) Arsenal		113.592
(Portugal) Porto		104.833
(Portugal) Benfica		102.833

Pot 2
Team	Notes	Coeff.
(Spain) Atlético Madrid		99.605
(Ukraine) Shakhtar Donetsk		94.951
(Italy) Milan		93.829
(Germany) Schalke 04		84.922
(France) Marseille		78.800
(Russia) CSKA Moscow		77.766
(France) Paris Saint-Germain		71.800
(Italy) Juventus		70.829

Pot 3
Team	Notes	Coeff.
(Russia) Zenit Saint Petersburg		70.766
(England) Manchester City		70.592
(Netherlands) Ajax		64.945
(Germany) Borussia Dortmund		61.922
(Switzerland) Basel		59.785
(Greece) Olympiacos		57.800
(Turkey) Galatasaray		54.400
(Germany) Bayer Leverkusen		53.922

Pot 4
Team	Notes	Coeff.
(Denmark) Copenhagen		47.140
(Italy) Napoli		46.829
(Belgium) Anderlecht		44.880
(Scotland) Celtic		37.538
(Romania) Steaua București		35.604
(Czech Republic) Viktoria Plzeň		28.745
(Spain) Real Sociedad		17.605
Austria Wien		16.575

Notes

1. ^{TH} Champions League title holders (automatic top seed of pot 1)
2. ^{CR} Qualified through play-off round (Champions Route)
3. ^{LR} Qualified through play-off round (League Route)

== Format ==
In each group, teams played against each other home-and-away in a round-robin format. The group winners and runners-up advanced to the round of 16, while the third-placed teams entered the Europa League round of 32.

=== Tiebreakers ===
The teams are ranked according to points (3 points for a win, 1 point for a draw, 0 points for a loss). If two or more teams are equal on points on completion of the group matches, the following criteria are applied to determine the rankings:

1. higher number of points obtained in the group matches played among the teams in question;
2. superior goal difference from the group matches played among the teams in question;
3. higher number of goals scored in the group matches played among the teams in question;
4. higher number of goals scored away from home in the group matches played among the teams in question;
5. If, after applying criteria 1 to 4 to several teams, two teams still have an equal ranking, criteria 1 to 4 are reapplied exclusively to the matches between the two teams in question to determine their final rankings. If this procedure does not lead to a decision, criteria 6 to 8 apply;
6. superior goal difference from all group matches played;
7. higher number of goals scored from all group matches played;
8. higher number of coefficient points accumulated by the club in question, as well as its association, over the previous five seasons.

== Groups ==
The matchdays were 17–18 September, 1–2 October, 22–23 October, 5–6 November, 26–27 November, and 10–11 December 2013. The match kickoff times were 20:45 CEST/CET, except for matches in Russia which were 18:00 CEST/CET.

Times are CET/CEST, (Note: CET (UTC+1) for matches from 5 November 2013, and CEST (UTC+2) for matches to 23 October 2013) as listed by UEFA (local times, if different, are in parentheses).

=== Group A ===
Pos	Team	Pld	W	D	L	GF	GA	GD	Pts	Qualification	MUN	LEV	SHK	RSO
1	(England) Manchester United	6	4	2	0	12	3	+9	14	Advance to knockout phase	—	4–2	1–0	1–0
2	(Germany) Bayer Leverkusen	6	3	1	2	9	10	−1	10	Advance to knockout phase	0–5	—	4–0	2–1
3	(Ukraine) Shakhtar Donetsk	6	2	2	2	7	6	+1	8	Transfer to Europa League	1–1	0–0	—	4–0
4	(Spain) Real Sociedad	6	0	1	5	1	10	−9	1		0–0	0–1	0–2	—

Source: UEFA
17 September 2013
20:45 (19:45 UTC+1)

Manchester United (England)	4–2	(Germany) Bayer Leverkusen
Rooney 22', 70'; Van Persie 59'; Valencia 79'	Report	Rolfes 54'; Toprak 88'

Old Trafford, Manchester
Attendance: 73,040
Referee: Damir Skomina (Slovenia)
17 September 2013
20:45

Real Sociedad (Spain)	0–2	(Ukraine) Shakhtar Donetsk
	Report	Alex Teixeira 65', 87'

Anoeta, San Sebastián
Attendance: 27,902
Referee: Ovidiu Hațegan (Romania)

2 October 2013
20:45 (21:45 UTC+3)

Shakhtar Donetsk (Ukraine)	1–1	(England) Manchester United
Taison 76'	Report	Welbeck 18'

Donbas Arena, Donetsk
Attendance: 51,555
Referee: Pavel Královec (Czech Republic)
2 October 2013
20:45

Bayer Leverkusen (Germany)	2–1	(Spain) Real Sociedad
Rolfes 45+1'; Hegeler 90+2'	Report	Vela 51'

BayArena, Leverkusen
Attendance: 27,462
Referee: Sergei Karasev (Russia)

23 October 2013
20:45

Bayer Leverkusen (Germany)	4–0	(Ukraine) Shakhtar Donetsk
Kießling 22', 72'; Rolfes 50' (pen.); Sam 57'	Report

BayArena, Leverkusen
Attendance: 25,184
Referee: Stéphane Lannoy (France)
23 October 2013
20:45 (19:45 UTC+1)

Manchester United (England)	1–0	(Spain) Real Sociedad
I. Martínez 2' (o.g.)	Report

Old Trafford, Manchester
Attendance: 74,654
Referee: Bas Nijhuis (Netherlands)

5 November 2013
20:45 (21:45 UTC+2)

Shakhtar Donetsk (Ukraine)	0–0	(Germany) Bayer Leverkusen
	Report

Donbas Arena, Donetsk
Attendance: 50,115
Referee: William Collum (Scotland)
5 November 2013
20:45

Real Sociedad (Spain)	0–0	(England) Manchester United
	Report

Anoeta, San Sebastián
Attendance: 30,998
Referee: Nicola Rizzoli (Italy)

27 November 2013
20:45

Bayer Leverkusen (Germany)	0–5	(England) Manchester United
	Report	Valencia 22'; Spahić 30' (o.g.); Evans 66'; Smalling 77'; Nani 88'

BayArena, Leverkusen
Attendance: 29,412
Referee: Svein Oddvar Moen (Norway)
27 November 2013
20:45 (21:45 UTC+2)

Shakhtar Donetsk (Ukraine)	4–0	(Spain) Real Sociedad
Luiz Adriano 37'; Alex Teixeira 48'; Douglas Costa 68', 87'	Report

Donbas Arena, Donetsk
Attendance: 44,348
Referee: Olegário Benquerença (Portugal)

10 December 2013
20:45 (19:45 UTC+0)

Manchester United (England)	1–0	(Ukraine) Shakhtar Donetsk
Jones 67'	Report

Old Trafford, Manchester
Attendance: 74,506
Referee: Milorad Mažić (Serbia)
10 December 2013
20:45

Real Sociedad (Spain)	0–1	(Germany) Bayer Leverkusen
	Report	Toprak 49'

Anoeta, San Sebastián
Attendance: 23,408
Referee: Tom Harald Hagen (Norway)

=== Group B ===
Pos	Team	Pld	W	D	L	GF	GA	GD	Pts	Qualification	RMA	GAL	JUV	CPH
1	(Spain) Real Madrid	6	5	1	0	20	5	+15	16	Advance to knockout phase	—	4–1	2–1	4–0
2	(Turkey) Galatasaray	6	2	1	3	8	14	−6	7	Advance to knockout phase	1–6	—	1–0	3–1
3	(Italy) Juventus	6	1	3	2	9	9	0	6	Transfer to Europa League	2–2	2–2	—	3–1
4	(Denmark) Copenhagen	6	1	1	4	4	13	−9	4		0–2	1–0	1–1	—

Source: UEFA
17 September 2013
20:45 (21:45 UTC+3)

Galatasaray (Turkey)	1–6	(Spain) Real Madrid
Bulut 84'	Report	Isco 33'; Benzema 54', 81'; Ronaldo 63', 66', 90+1'

Türk Telekom Arena, Istanbul
Attendance: 47,669
Referee: Mark Clattenburg (England)
17 September 2013
20:45

Copenhagen (Denmark)	1–1	(Italy) Juventus
Jørgensen 14'	Report	Quagliarella 54'

Parken Stadium, Copenhagen
Attendance: 36,524
Referee: Ivan Bebek (Croatia)

2 October 2013
20:45

Juventus (Italy)	2–2	(Turkey) Galatasaray
Vidal 78' (pen.); Quagliarella 87'	Report	Drogba 36'; Bulut 88'

Juventus Stadium, Turin
Attendance: 33,466
Referee: Viktor Kassai (Hungary)
2 October 2013
20:45

Real Madrid (Spain)	4–0	(Denmark) Copenhagen
Ronaldo 21', 65'; Di María 71', 90+1'	Report

Santiago Bernabéu, Madrid
Attendance: 69,347
Referee: Matej Jug (Slovenia)

23 October 2013
20:45

Real Madrid (Spain)	2–1	(Italy) Juventus
Ronaldo 4', 29' (pen.)	Report	Llorente 22'

Santiago Bernabéu, Madrid
Attendance: 77,856
Referee: Manuel Gräfe (Germany)
23 October 2013
20:45 (21:45 UTC+3)

Galatasaray (Turkey)	3–1	(Denmark) Copenhagen
Melo 10'; Sneijder 38'; Drogba 45+1'	Report	Claudemir 88'

Türk Telekom Arena, Istanbul
Attendance: 42,798
Referee: Aleksandar Stavrev (Macedonia)

5 November 2013
20:45

Juventus (Italy)	2–2	(Spain) Real Madrid
Vidal 42' (pen.); Llorente 65'	Report	Ronaldo 52'; Bale 60'

Juventus Stadium, Turin
Attendance: 40,696
Referee: Howard Webb (England)
5 November 2013
20:45

Copenhagen (Denmark)	1–0	(Turkey) Galatasaray
Braaten 6'	Report

Parken Stadium, Copenhagen
Attendance: 36,204
Referee: Martin Atkinson (England)

27 November 2013
20:45

Real Madrid (Spain)	4–1	(Turkey) Galatasaray
Bale 37'; Arbeloa 51'; Di María 63'; Isco 81'	Report	Bulut 38'

Santiago Bernabéu, Madrid
Attendance: 67,728
Referee: William Collum (Scotland)
27 November 2013
20:45

Juventus (Italy)	3–1	(Denmark) Copenhagen
Vidal 29' (pen.), 61' (pen.), 63'	Report	Mellberg 56'

Juventus Stadium, Turin
Attendance: 39,506
Referee: Jonas Eriksson (Sweden)

10 December 2013 (Note: The match was abandoned after 31 minutes due to heavy snow, and was resumed on 11 December 2013, 14:00 (15:00 UTC+2), from the point of abandonment.)
20:45 (21:45 UTC+2)

Galatasaray (Turkey)	1–0	(Italy) Juventus
Sneijder 85'	Report

Türk Telekom Arena, Istanbul
Attendance: 37,375
Referee: Pedro Proença (Portugal)
10 December 2013
20:45

Copenhagen (Denmark)	0–2	(Spain) Real Madrid
	Report	Modrić 25'; Ronaldo 48'

Parken Stadium, Copenhagen
Attendance: 37,241
Referee: Felix Brych (Germany)

=== Group C ===
Pos	Team	Pld	W	D	L	GF	GA	GD	Pts	Qualification	PAR	OLY	BEN	AND
1	(France) Paris Saint-Germain	6	4	1	1	16	5	+11	13	Advance to knockout phase	—	2–1	3–0	1–1
2	(Greece) Olympiacos	6	3	1	2	10	8	+2	10 (Note: Head-to-head points: Olympiacos 4, Benfica 1.)	Advance to knockout phase	1–4	—	1–0	3–1
3	(Portugal) Benfica	6	3	1	2	8	8	0	10	Transfer to Europa League	2–1	1–1	—	2–0
4	(Belgium) Anderlecht	6	0	1	5	4	17	−13	1		0–5	0–3	2–3	—

Source: UEFA
Notes:
17 September 2013
20:45 (19:45 UTC+1)

Benfica (Portugal)	2–0	(Belgium) Anderlecht
Đuričić 4'; Luisão 30'	Report

Estádio da Luz, Lisbon
Attendance: 29,393
Referee: Manuel Gräfe (Germany)
17 September 2013
20:45 (21:45 UTC+2)

Olympiacos (Greece)	1–4	(France) Paris Saint-Germain
Weiss 25'	Report	Cavani 19'; Motta 68', 73'; Marquinhos 86'

Karaiskakis Stadium, Piraeus
Attendance: 31,253
Referee: Felix Brych (Germany)

2 October 2013
20:45

Paris Saint-Germain (France)	3–0	(Portugal) Benfica
Ibrahimović 5', 30'; Marquinhos 25'	Report

Parc des Princes, Paris
Attendance: 44,732
Referee: Nicola Rizzoli (Italy)
2 October 2013
20:45

Anderlecht (Belgium)	0–3	(Greece) Olympiacos
	Report	Mitroglou 17', 56', 72'

Constant Vanden Stock Stadium, Brussels
Attendance: 15,918
Referee: Tom Harald Hagen (Norway)

23 October 2013
20:45

Anderlecht (Belgium)	0–5	(France) Paris Saint-Germain
	Report	Ibrahimović 17', 22', 36', 62'; Cavani 52'

Constant Vanden Stock Stadium, Brussels
Attendance: 18,465
Referee: David Fernández Borbalán (Spain)
23 October 2013
20:45 (19:45 UTC+1)

Benfica (Portugal)	1–1	(Greece) Olympiacos
Cardozo 83'	Report	Domínguez 29'

Estádio da Luz, Lisbon
Attendance: 38,149
Referee: Alberto Undiano Mallenco (Spain)

5 November 2013
20:45

Paris Saint-Germain (France)	1–1	(Belgium) Anderlecht
Ibrahimović 70'	Report	De Zeeuw 68'

Parc des Princes, Paris
Attendance: 43,091
Referee: Marijo Strahonja (Croatia)
5 November 2013
20:45 (21:45 UTC+2)

Olympiacos (Greece)	1–0	(Portugal) Benfica
Manolas 13'	Report

Karaiskakis Stadium, Piraeus
Attendance: 31,461
Referee: Damir Skomina (Slovenia)

27 November 2013
20:45

Anderlecht (Belgium)	2–3	(Portugal) Benfica
Mbemba 18'; Bruno 77'	Report	Matić 34'; Mbemba 52' (o.g.); Rodrigo 90'

Constant Vanden Stock Stadium, Brussels
Attendance: 16,780
Referee: Daniele Orsato (Italy)
27 November 2013
20:45

Paris Saint-Germain (France)	2–1	(Greece) Olympiacos
Ibrahimović 7'; Cavani 90'	Report	Manolas 80'

Parc des Princes, Paris
Attendance: 44,466
Referee: Craig Thomson (Scotland)

10 December 2013
20:45 (19:45 UTC+0)

Benfica (Portugal)	2–1	(France) Paris Saint-Germain
Lima 45' (pen.); Gaitán 58'	Report	Cavani 37'

Estádio da Luz, Lisbon
Attendance: 30,089
Referee: Mark Clattenburg (England)
10 December 2013
20:45 (21:45 UTC+2)

Olympiacos (Greece)	3–1	(Belgium) Anderlecht
Saviola 33', 58'; Domínguez 90+5' (pen.)	Report	Kljestan 39'

Karaiskakis Stadium, Piraeus
Attendance: 31,444
Referee: Wolfgang Stark (Germany)

=== Group D ===
Pos	Team	Pld	W	D	L	GF	GA	GD	Pts	Qualification	BAY	MCI	PLZ	CSKA
1	(Germany) Bayern Munich	6	5	0	1	17	5	+12	15 (Note: Tied on head-to-head points (3). Head-to-head goal difference: Bayern Munich +1, Manchester City −1.)	Advance to knockout phase	—	2–3	5–0	3–0
2	(England) Manchester City	6	5	0	1	18	10	+8	15	Advance to knockout phase	1–3	—	4–2	5–2
3	(Czech Republic) Viktoria Plzeň	6	1	0	5	6	17	−11	3 (Note: Tied on head-to-head points (3) and head-to-head goal difference (0). Head-to-head away goals: Viktoria Plzeň 2, CSKA Moscow 1.)	Transfer to Europa League	0–1	0–3	—	2–1
4	(Russia) CSKA Moscow	6	1	0	5	8	17	−9	3		1–3	1–2	3–2	—

Source: UEFA
Notes:
17 September 2013
20:45

Bayern Munich (Germany)	3–0	(Russia) CSKA Moscow
Alaba 4'; Mandžukić 41'; Robben 68'	Report

Allianz Arena, Munich
Attendance: 68,000
Referee: Gianluca Rocchi (Italy)
17 September 2013
20:45

Viktoria Plzeň (Czech Republic)	0–3	(England) Manchester City
	Report	Džeko 48'; Touré 53'; Agüero 58'

Doosan Arena, Plzeň
Attendance: 11,281
Referee: Paolo Tagliavento (Italy)

2 October 2013
18:00 (20:00 UTC+4)

CSKA Moscow (Russia)	3–2	(Czech Republic) Viktoria Plzeň
Tošić 19'; Honda 29'; Řezník 78' (o.g.)	Report	Rajtoral 4'; Bakoš 90+1'

Petrovsky Stadium, Saint Petersburg (Note: The CSKA Moscow v Viktoria Plzeň match was moved to Petrovsky Stadium, Saint Petersburg due to the poor quality of the pitch at Arena Khimki, Khimki.)
Attendance: 6,135
Referee: Bas Nijhuis (Netherlands)
2 October 2013
20:45 (19:45 UTC+1)

Manchester City (England)	1–3	(Germany) Bayern Munich
Negredo 79'	Report	Ribéry 7'; Müller 56'; Robben 59'

City of Manchester Stadium, Manchester
Attendance: 45,021
Referee: Björn Kuipers (Netherlands)

23 October 2013
18:00 (20:00 UTC+4)

CSKA Moscow (Russia)	1–2	(England) Manchester City
Tošić 32'	Report	Agüero 34', 42'

Arena Khimki, Khimki
Attendance: 14,000
Referee: Ovidiu Hațegan (Romania)
23 October 2013
20:45

Bayern Munich (Germany)	5–0	(Czech Republic) Viktoria Plzeň
Ribéry 25' (pen.), 61'; Alaba 37'; Schweinsteiger 64'; Götze 90+1'	Report

Allianz Arena, Munich
Attendance: 68,000
Referee: Alan Kelly (Republic of Ireland)

5 November 2013
20:45 (19:45 UTC+0)

Manchester City (England)	5–2	(Russia) CSKA Moscow
Agüero 3' (pen.), 20'; Negredo 30', 51', 90+2'	Report	Doumbia 45+1', 71' (pen.)

City of Manchester Stadium, Manchester
Attendance: 38,512
Referee: Carlos Velasco Carballo (Spain)
5 November 2013
20:45

Viktoria Plzeň (Czech Republic)	0–1	(Germany) Bayern Munich
	Report	Mandžukić 65'

Doosan Arena, Plzeň
Attendance: 11,360
Referee: Antonio Mateu Lahoz (Spain)

27 November 2013
18:00 (21:00 UTC+4)

CSKA Moscow (Russia)	1–3	(Germany) Bayern Munich
Honda 62' (pen.)	Report	Robben 17'; Götze 56'; Müller 65' (pen.)

Arena Khimki, Khimki
Attendance: 14,000
Referee: Antony Gautier (France)
27 November 2013
20:45 (19:45 UTC+0)

Manchester City (England)	4–2	(Czech Republic) Viktoria Plzeň
Agüero 33' (pen.); Nasri 65'; Negredo 78'; Džeko 89'	Report	Hořava 43'; Tecl 69'

City of Manchester Stadium, Manchester
Attendance: 37,742
Referee: Fırat Aydınus (Turkey)

10 December 2013
20:45

Bayern Munich (Germany)	2–3	(England) Manchester City
Müller 5'; Götze 12'	Report	Silva 28'; Kolarov 59' (pen.); Milner 62'

Allianz Arena, Munich
Attendance: 68,000
Referee: David Fernández Borbalán (Spain)
10 December 2013
20:45

Viktoria Plzeň (Czech Republic)	2–1	(Russia) CSKA Moscow
Kolář 76'; Wágner 90'	Report	Musa 65'

Doosan Arena, Plzeň
Attendance: 11,205
Referee: Damir Skomina (Slovenia)

=== Group E ===
Pos	Team	Pld	W	D	L	GF	GA	GD	Pts	Qualification	CHE	SCH	BSL	STE
1	(England) Chelsea	6	4	0	2	12	3	+9	12	Advance to knockout phase	—	3–0	1–2	1–0
2	(Germany) Schalke 04	6	3	1	2	6	6	0	10	Advance to knockout phase	0–3	—	2–0	3–0
3	(Switzerland) Basel	6	2	2	2	5	6	−1	8	Transfer to Europa League	1–0	0–1	—	1–1
4	(Romania) Steaua București	6	0	3	3	2	10	−8	3		0–4	0–0	1–1	—

Source: UEFA
18 September 2013
20:45

Schalke 04 (Germany)	3–0	(Romania) Steaua București
Uchida 67'; Boateng 78'; Draxler 85'	Report

Arena AufSchalke, Gelsenkirchen
Attendance: 49,358
Referee: Cüneyt Çakır (Turkey)
18 September 2013
20:45 (19:45 UTC+1)

Chelsea (England)	1–2	(Switzerland) Basel
Oscar 45'	Report	Salah 71'; Streller 81'

Stamford Bridge, London
Attendance: 40,358
Referee: Daniele Orsato (Italy)

1 October 2013
20:45

Basel (Switzerland)	0–1	(Germany) Schalke 04
	Report	Draxler 54'

St. Jakob-Park, Basel
Attendance: 33,251
Referee: Alberto Undiano Mallenco (Spain)
1 October 2013
20:45 (21:45 UTC+3)

Steaua București (Romania)	0–4	(England) Chelsea
	Report	Ramires 20', 55'; Georgievski 44' (o.g.); Lampard 90'

Arena Națională, Bucharest
Attendance: 36,713
Referee: Carlos Velasco Carballo (Spain)

22 October 2013
20:45 (21:45 UTC+3)

Steaua București (Romania)	1–1	(Switzerland) Basel
Tatu 88'	Report	Díaz 48'

Arena Națională, Bucharest
Attendance: 23,899
Referee: Matej Jug (Slovenia)
22 October 2013
20:45

Schalke 04 (Germany)	0–3	(England) Chelsea
	Report	Torres 5', 69'; Hazard 87'

Arena AufSchalke, Gelsenkirchen
Attendance: 54,442
Referee: Viktor Kassai (Hungary)

6 November 2013
20:45

Basel (Switzerland)	1–1	(Romania) Steaua București
Sio 90+1'	Report	Piovaccari 17'

St. Jakob-Park, Basel
Attendance: 30,704
Referee: Olegário Benquerença (Portugal)
6 November 2013
20:45 (19:45 UTC+0)

Chelsea (England)	3–0	(Germany) Schalke 04
Eto'o 31', 54'; Ba 83'	Report

Stamford Bridge, London
Attendance: 41,194
Referee: Svein Oddvar Moen (Norway)

26 November 2013
20:45 (21:45 UTC+2)

Steaua București (Romania)	0–0	(Germany) Schalke 04
	Report

Arena Națională, Bucharest
Attendance: 50,633
Referee: Bas Nijhuis (Netherlands)
26 November 2013
20:45

Basel (Switzerland)	1–0	(England) Chelsea
Salah 87'	Report

St. Jakob-Park, Basel
Attendance: 35,208
Referee: Stéphane Lannoy (France)

11 December 2013
20:45

Schalke 04 (Germany)	2–0	(Switzerland) Basel
Draxler 51'; Matip 57'	Report

Arena AufSchalke, Gelsenkirchen
Attendance: 52,093
Referee: Paolo Tagliavento (Italy)
11 December 2013
20:45 (19:45 UTC+0)

Chelsea (England)	1–0	(Romania) Steaua București
Ba 10'	Report

Stamford Bridge, London
Attendance: 41,181
Referee: Gianluca Rocchi (Italy)

=== Group F ===
Pos	Team	Pld	W	D	L	GF	GA	GD	Pts	Qualification	DOR	ARS	NAP	MAR
1	(Germany) Borussia Dortmund	6	4	0	2	11	6	+5	12 (Note: Tied on head-to-head points (6). Head-to-head goal difference: Borussia Dortmund +1, Arsenal 0, Napoli −1.)	Advance to knockout phase	—	0–1	3–1	3–0
2	(England) Arsenal	6	4	0	2	8	5	+3	12	Advance to knockout phase	1–2	—	2–0	2–0
3	(Italy) Napoli	6	4	0	2	10	9	+1	12	Transfer to Europa League	2–1	2–0	—	3–2
4	(France) Marseille	6	0	0	6	5	14	−9	0		1–2	1–2	1–2	—

Source: UEFA
Notes:
18 September 2013
20:45

Marseille (France)	1–2	(England) Arsenal
J. Ayew 90+3' (pen.)	Report	Walcott 65'; Ramsey 83'

Stade Vélodrome, Marseille
Attendance: 38,380
Referee: Olegário Benquerença (Portugal)
18 September 2013
20:45

Napoli (Italy)	2–1	(Germany) Borussia Dortmund
Higuaín 29'; Insigne 67'	Report	Zúñiga 87' (o.g.)

Stadio San Paolo, Naples
Attendance: 55,766
Referee: Pedro Proença (Portugal)

1 October 2013
20:45

Borussia Dortmund (Germany)	3–0	(France) Marseille
Lewandowski 19', 79' (pen.); Reus 52'	Report

Westfalenstadion, Dortmund
Attendance: 65,829
Referee: David Fernández Borbalán (Spain)
1 October 2013
20:45 (19:45 UTC+1)

Arsenal (England)	2–0	(Italy) Napoli
Özil 8'; Giroud 15'	Report

Emirates Stadium, London
Attendance: 59,536
Referee: Milorad Mažić (Serbia)

22 October 2013
20:45 (19:45 UTC+1)

Arsenal (England)	1–2	(Germany) Borussia Dortmund
Giroud 41'	Report	Mkhitaryan 16'; Lewandowski 82'

Emirates Stadium, London
Attendance: 60,011
Referee: Jonas Eriksson (Sweden)
22 October 2013
20:45

Marseille (France)	1–2	(Italy) Napoli
A. Ayew 86'	Report	Callejón 42'; Zapata 67'

Stade Vélodrome, Marseille
Attendance: 39,790
Referee: Cüneyt Çakır (Turkey)

6 November 2013
20:45

Borussia Dortmund (Germany)	0–1	(England) Arsenal
	Report	Ramsey 62'

Westfalenstadion, Dortmund
Attendance: 65,829
Referee: Björn Kuipers (Netherlands)
6 November 2013
20:45

Napoli (Italy)	3–2	(France) Marseille
Inler 22'; Higuaín 24', 75'	Report	A. Ayew 10'; Thauvin 64'

Stadio San Paolo, Naples
Attendance: 39,148
Referee: Sergei Karasev (Russia)

26 November 2013
20:45 (19:45 UTC+0)

Arsenal (England)	2–0	(France) Marseille
Wilshere 1', 65'	Report

Emirates Stadium, London
Attendance: 59,912
Referee: Antonio Mateu Lahoz (Spain)
26 November 2013
20:45

Borussia Dortmund (Germany)	3–1	(Italy) Napoli
Reus 10' (pen.); Błaszczykowski 60'; Aubameyang 78'	Report	Insigne 71'

Westfalenstadion, Dortmund
Attendance: 65,829
Referee: Carlos Velasco Carballo (Spain)

11 December 2013
20:45

Marseille (France)	1–2	(Germany) Borussia Dortmund
Diawara 14'	Report	Lewandowski 4'; Großkreutz 87'

Stade Vélodrome, Marseille
Attendance: 36,655
Referee: Marijo Strahonja (Croatia)
11 December 2013
20:45

Napoli (Italy)	2–0	(England) Arsenal
Higuaín 73'; Callejón 90+3'	Report

Stadio San Paolo, Naples
Attendance: 34,027
Referee: Viktor Kassai (Hungary)

=== Group G ===
Pos	Team	Pld	W	D	L	GF	GA	GD	Pts	Qualification	ATM	ZEN	POR	AWI
1	(Spain) Atlético Madrid	6	5	1	0	15	3	+12	16	Advance to knockout phase	—	3–1	2–0	4–0
2	(Russia) Zenit Saint Petersburg	6	1	3	2	5	9	−4	6	Advance to knockout phase	1–1	—	1–1	0–0
3	(Portugal) Porto	6	1	2	3	4	7	−3	5 (Note: Head-to-head points: Porto 4, Austria Wien 1.)	Transfer to Europa League	1–2	0–1	—	1–1
4	Austria Wien	6	1	2	3	5	10	−5	5		0–3	4–1	0–1	—

Source: UEFA
Notes:
18 September 2013
20:45

Austria Wien	0–1	(Portugal) Porto
	Report	L. González 55'

Ernst-Happel-Stadion, Vienna (Note: Austria Wien played their home matches at Ernst-Happel-Stadion, Vienna instead of their regular stadium, Franz Horr Stadium, Vienna.)
Attendance: 37,500
Referee: Craig Thomson (Scotland)
18 September 2013
20:45

Atlético Madrid (Spain)	3–1	(Russia) Zenit Saint Petersburg
Miranda 40'; Turan 64'; Léo Baptistão 80'	Report	Hulk 58'

Vicente Calderón, Madrid
Attendance: 33,855
Referee: William Collum (Scotland)

1 October 2013
18:00 (20:00 UTC+4)

Zenit Saint Petersburg (Russia)	0–0	Austria Wien
	Report

Petrovsky Stadium, Saint Petersburg
Attendance: 18,785
Referee: Deniz Aytekin (Germany)
1 October 2013
20:45 (19:45 UTC+1)

Porto (Portugal)	1–2	(Spain) Atlético Madrid
Martínez 16'	Report	Godín 58'; Turan 86'

Estádio do Dragão, Porto
Attendance: 33,989
Referee: Howard Webb (England)

22 October 2013
20:45 (19:45 UTC+1)

Porto (Portugal)	0–1	(Russia) Zenit Saint Petersburg
	Report	Kerzhakov 86'

Estádio do Dragão, Porto
Attendance: 31,109
Referee: Paolo Tagliavento (Italy)
22 October 2013
20:45

Austria Wien	0–3	(Spain) Atlético Madrid
	Report	García 8'; Costa 20', 53'

Ernst-Happel-Stadion, Vienna
Attendance: 45,675
Referee: Daniele Orsato (Italy)

6 November 2013
18:00 (21:00 UTC+4)

Zenit Saint Petersburg (Russia)	1–1	(Portugal) Porto
Hulk 28'	Report	L. González 23'

Petrovsky Stadium, Saint Petersburg
Attendance: 17,786
Referee: Tom Harald Hagen (Norway)
6 November 2013
20:45

Atlético Madrid (Spain)	4–0	Austria Wien
Miranda 11'; García 25'; Filipe Luís 45'; Costa 82'	Report

Vicente Calderón, Madrid
Attendance: 29,841
Referee: István Vad (Hungary)

26 November 2013
18:00 (21:00 UTC+4)

Zenit Saint Petersburg (Russia)	1–1	(Spain) Atlético Madrid
Alderweireld 74' (o.g.)	Report	Adrián 53'

Petrovsky Stadium, Saint Petersburg
Attendance: 17,885
Referee: Martin Atkinson (England)
26 November 2013
20:45 (19:45 UTC+0)

Porto (Portugal)	1–1	Austria Wien
Martínez 48'	Report	Kienast 11'

Estádio do Dragão, Porto
Attendance: 24,809
Referee: Ovidiu Hațegan (Romania)

11 December 2013
20:45

Austria Wien	4–1	(Russia) Zenit Saint Petersburg
Hosiner 44', 51'; Jun 48'; Kienast 90+3'	Report	Kerzhakov 35'

Ernst-Happel-Stadion, Vienna
Attendance: 37,500
Referee: Aleksandar Stavrev (Macedonia)
11 December 2013
20:45

Atlético Madrid (Spain)	2–0	(Portugal) Porto
García 14'; Costa 37'	Report

Vicente Calderón, Madrid
Attendance: 24,629
Referee: Deniz Aytekin (Germany)

=== Group H ===
Pos	Team	Pld	W	D	L	GF	GA	GD	Pts	Qualification	BAR	MIL	AJX	CEL
1	(Spain) Barcelona	6	4	1	1	16	5	+11	13	Advance to knockout phase	—	3–1	4–0	6–1
2	(Italy) Milan	6	2	3	1	8	5	+3	9	Advance to knockout phase	1–1	—	0–0	2–0
3	(Netherlands) Ajax	6	2	2	2	5	8	−3	8	Transfer to Europa League	2–1	1–1	—	1–0
4	(Scotland) Celtic	6	1	0	5	3	14	−11	3		0–1	0–3	2–1	—

Source: UEFA
18 September 2013
20:45

Milan (Italy)	2–0	(Scotland) Celtic
Izaguirre 82' (o.g.); Muntari 86'	Report

San Siro, Milan
Attendance: 54,623
Referee: Wolfgang Stark (Germany)
18 September 2013
20:45

Barcelona (Spain)	4–0	(Netherlands) Ajax
Messi 22', 55', 75'; Piqué 69'	Report

Camp Nou, Barcelona
Attendance: 79,412
Referee: Svein Oddvar Moen (Norway)

1 October 2013
20:45

Ajax (Netherlands)	1–1	(Italy) Milan
Denswil 90'	Report	Balotelli 90+4' (pen.)

Amsterdam Arena, Amsterdam
Attendance: 51,692
Referee: Jonas Eriksson (Sweden)
1 October 2013
20:45 (19:45 UTC+1)

Celtic (Scotland)	0–1	(Spain) Barcelona
	Report	Fàbregas 76'

Celtic Park, Glasgow
Attendance: 58,128
Referee: Stéphane Lannoy (France)

22 October 2013
20:45 (19:45 UTC+1)

Celtic (Scotland)	2–1	(Netherlands) Ajax
Forrest 43' (pen.); Kayal 53'	Report	Schöne 90+4'

Celtic Park, Glasgow
Attendance: 58,719
Referee: Ivan Bebek (Croatia)
22 October 2013
20:45

Milan (Italy)	1–1	(Spain) Barcelona
Robinho 9'	Report	Messi 23'

San Siro, Milan
Attendance: 74,487
Referee: Felix Brych (Germany)

6 November 2013
20:45

Ajax (Netherlands)	1–0	(Scotland) Celtic
Schöne 51'	Report

Amsterdam Arena, Amsterdam
Attendance: 59,908
Referee: Deniz Aytekin (Germany)
6 November 2013
20:45

Barcelona (Spain)	3–1	(Italy) Milan
Messi 30' (pen.), 83'; Busquets 40'	Report	Piqué 45' (o.g.)

Camp Nou, Barcelona
Attendance: 80,517
Referee: Milorad Mažić (Serbia)

26 November 2013
20:45 (19:45 UTC+0)

Celtic (Scotland)	0–3	(Italy) Milan
	Report	Kaká 13'; Zapata 49'; Balotelli 60'

Celtic Park, Glasgow
Attendance: 58,619
Referee: Cüneyt Çakır (Turkey)
26 November 2013
20:45

Ajax (Netherlands)	2–1	(Spain) Barcelona
Serero 19'; Hoesen 42'	Report	Xavi 49' (pen.)

Amsterdam Arena, Amsterdam
Attendance: 53,000
Referee: Pavel Královec (Czech Republic)

11 December 2013
20:45

Milan (Italy)	0–0	(Netherlands) Ajax
	Report

San Siro, Milan
Attendance: 61,744
Referee: Howard Webb (England)
11 December 2013
20:45

Barcelona (Spain)	6–1	(Scotland) Celtic
Piqué 7'; Pedro 40'; Neymar 44', 48', 58'; Tello 72'	Report	Samaras 88'

Camp Nou, Barcelona
Attendance: 54,342
Referee: Sergei Karasev (Russia)
