= 2002–03 CA Osasuna season =

Osasuna
2002–03 season
- Manager: Javier Aguirre
- Stadium: El Sadar
- La Liga: 11th
- Copa del Rey: Semifinals
- Top goalscorer: John Aloisi (8)
Home colours

The 2002–03 CA Osasuna season is the 82nd season in the club's history.in the La Liga.

== Review ==
=== May ===
Osasuna finished the season in 11th position in the La Liga table. In other competitions, Osasuna reached the semifinals of the Copa del Rey.

John Aloisi was the top scorer for Osasuna with 8 goals in all competitions.

== Players and staff ==
=== Squad information ===
| N | Pos. | Nat. | Name | Age | EU | Since | App | Goals | Ends | Transfer fee | Notes |
|---|---|---|---|---|---|---|---|---|---|---|---|
| 1 | GK | (Spain) | Sanzol | | EU | 1998 | 45 | 0 | | | |
| 2 | RB | (Spain) | Yanguas | | EU | 1993 | 228 | 1 | | | |

- Last updated: 8 October 2014
- Source: Osasuna.es,

== Kits ==
Osasuna's kit was manufactured by Spanish sports retailer Astore and sponsored by Caja Navarra.

== Competitions ==
=== Overall record ===
| Competition | First match | Last match | Final position | Record | | | | | | | |
| Competition | First match | Last match | Final position | Pld | W | D | L | GF | GA | GD | Win % |
|---|---|---|---|---|---|---|---|---|---|---|---|
| 2002–03 La Liga | September 1, 2002 | June 21, 2003 | 11 | 38 | 12 | 11 | 15 | 40 | 48 | −8 | 31.58 |
| Copa del Rey | | | | | | | | — | | | |
| Total | | | | 38 | 12 | 11 | 15 | 40 | 48 | −8 | 31.58 |

Source: Competitions

== Squad ==
Note: Flags indicate national team as defined under FIFA eligibility rules; some limited exceptions apply. Players may hold more than one non-FIFA nationality.

| No. | Pos. | Nation | Player |
|---|---|---|---|
| 1 | GK | ESP | Ricardo Sanzol |
| 2 | DF | ESP | José Manuel Yanguas |
| 3 | DF | ESP | Paqui |
| 4 | DF | ESP | José Manuel Mateo |
| 5 | MF | ITA | Christian Manfredini |
| 6 | MF | ESP | Alfredo |
| 7 | DF | ESP | César Cruchaga |
| 8 | MF | ESP | César Palacios |
| 9 | FW | ESP | Iván Rosado |
| 10 | MF | ESP | Francisco Puñal |
| 11 | MF | MAR | Moha El Yaagoubi |
| 14 | DF | ESP | Josetxo |

| No. | Pos. | Nation | Player |
|---|---|---|---|
| 15 | DF | ESP | José Izquierdo |
| 16 | MF | URU | Pablo García |
| 18 | FW | URU | Richard Morales |
| 19 | MF | ARG | Gerardo Damian Rivero |
| 20 | FW | AUS | John Aloisi |
| 22 | MF | ESP | Iñaki Muñoz |
| 23 | MF | ARG | Leonel Gancedo |
| 25 | GK | ESP | Juan Carlos Unzué |
| 26 | GK | ESP | Mikel Pagola |
| 27 | FW | ESP | Gorka Brit |
| 29 | DF | ESP | Antonio López |
| 32 | MF | ESP | Valdo |
