= 2002–03 Copa del Rey =

101st Copa del Rey

Tournament details
- Country: Spain
- Teams: 81

Final positions
- Champions: Mallorca
- Runners-up: Recreativo de Huelva

Tournament statistics
- Matches played: 111
- Goals scored: 301 (2.71 per match)
- Top goal scorer: Javier Portillo (8)

The 2002–03 Copa del Rey was the 101st staging of the Copa del Rey.

The competition started on 28 August 2002 and concluded on 28 June 2003 with the final, held at the Martinez Valero in Elche, in which Mallorca lifted the trophy for the first time ever with a 3–0 victory over Recreativo de Huelva.

== Preliminary round ==
Team 1	Agg.	Team 2	1st leg	2nd leg
Hércules CF	3–1	Zamora CF	3–0	0–1
Tomelloso CF	1–6	Amurrio Club	1–4	0–2
Cultural Leonesa	3–2	Real Avila CF	2–1	1–1
CP Cacereño	4–0	AD Ceuta	2–0	2–0
UP Langreo	2–3	Jerez CF	0–0	2–3
UDA Gramenet	2–1	CE Mataró	1–0	1–1
Atlético Baleares	0–5	Novelda CF	0–2	0–3
UD Fraga	0–7	Real Unión	0–4	0–3
UD Lanzarote	(a) 4–4	Pontevedra CF	2–1	2–3
UD San Sebastián de los Reyes	3–1	Marino de Luanco	1–1	1–0
CD Burriana	0–5	Alicante CF	0–1	0–4
Villanueva CF	0–3	Ciudad de Murcia	0–0	0–3
Alondras CF	0–4	CD Corralejo	0–1	0–3
SD Lemona	3–1	SD Noja	0–1	3–0
CD Linares	(4–2 p) 0–0	Mérida UD	0–0	0–0
Orihuela CF	1–2	Palamós CF	0–0	1–2
Barakaldo CF	2–1	CM Peralta	1–1	1–0

== Round of 64 ==
Team 1	Score	Team 2
UD Salamanca	0–4	Racing de Ferrol
SD Lemona	0–3	CA Osasuna
Hércules CF	2–1	Villarreal CF
SD Compostela	0–1	Real Oviedo
Terrassa FC	2–0	Levante UD
UDA Gramenet	0–1	RCD Mallorca
Novelda CF	3–2	FC Barcelona
Palamós CF	6–1	Elche CF
Barakaldo CF	1–3 (aet)	Deportivo Alavés
Amurrio Club	1–2	Athletic de Bilbao
CP Cacereño	0–2	Xerez CD
Real Unión	3–2	Racing de Santander
Getafe CF	2–1 (aet)	UD Las Palmas
UD Lanzarote	1–2	Atlético Madrid
Real Zaragoza	3–1	Real Sociedad
CD Numancia	2–0	CD Tenerife
Sporting de Gijón	1–2	Real Valladolid
Cultural Leonesa	2–1	Rayo Vallecano
Motril CF	1–1 (3–4 p)	CD Badajoz
Burgos CF	0–1	Celta de Vigo
Alicante CF	1–0	RCD Espanyol
Real Jaén	0–3	Sevilla FC
Gimnàstic de Tarragona	0–0 (4–5 p)	Valencia CF
CF Extremadura	1–1 (1–4 p)	Málaga CF
UD San Sebastián de los Reyes	1–8	Real Madrid
CD Linares	1–0	CD Leganés
Jerez CF	0–3	Real Betis
UD Almería	3–2 (aet)	Córdoba CF
Albacete Balompié	1–2	SD Eibar
CD Corralejo	1–2	Deportivo La Coruña
Real Murcia	1–0	Poli Ejido
Villanueva CF	1–2	Recreativo de Huelva

== Round of 32 ==
Team 1	Score	Team 2
Novelda CF	0–3	Terrassa FC
Hércules CF	0–0 (3–4 p)	RCD Mallorca
Racing de Ferrol	3–4	Deportivo La Coruña
Real Unión	2–1	Athletic de Bilbao
SD Eibar	0–0 (6–7 p)	CA Osasuna
Palamós CF	3–6	Real Betis
Real Oviedo	0–4	Real Madrid
Getafe CF	1–2 (aet)	Real Valladolid
Cultural Leonesa	0–2	Atlético de Madrid
Real Murcia	1–0	CD Badajoz
Xerez CD	2–0	Málaga CF
Real Zaragoza	1–2	Deportivo Alavés
CD Linares	1–2	Sevilla CF
UD Almería	0–1	Recreativo de Huelva
Alicante CF	(5–4 p) 3–3	Valencia CF
CD Numancia	1–0	Celta Vigo

== Round of 16 ==
Team 1	Agg.	Team 2	1st leg	2nd leg
Alicante CF	2–5	Deportivo La Coruña	1–1	1–4
Real Murcia	2–1	Deportivo Alavés	0–0	2–1
Real Betis	0–1	Recreativo de Huelva	0–0	0–1
Terrassa FC	5–7	Real Madrid	3–3	2–4
RCD Mallorca	6–3	Real Valladolid	2–2	4–1
Real Unión	1–5	CA Osasuna	0–4	1–1
CD Numancia	2–5	Sevilla FC	1–3	1–2
Xerez CD	0–4	Atlético de Madrid	0–1	0–3

=== First leg ===
7 January 2003	Alicante CF	1–1	Deportivo La Coruña	Alicante
21:30 CET	Morante 38'	Report (in Spanish)	Sergio 79'	Stadium: Rico Pérez; Attendance: 10,000; Referee: Víctor José Esquinas Torres

8 January 2003	Real Murcia	0–0	Deportivo Alavés	Murcia
21:00 CET		Report (in Spanish)		Stadium: La Condomina; Attendance: 6,000; Referee: Antonio Rubinos Pérez

8 January 2003	Real Betis	0–0	Recreativo de Huelva	Seville
21:00 CET		Report (in Spanish)		Stadium: Manuel Ruiz de Lopera; Attendance: 12,000; Referee: Arturo Daudén Ibáñez

8 January 2003	Terrassa FC	3–3	Real Madrid	Terrassa
21:00 CET	Babangida 62'; Monty 81', 84'	Report (in Spanish)	Portillo 25' (pen.); Guti 68', 71'	Stadium: Olympic; Attendance: 11,000; Referee: Eduardo Iturralde González

8 January 2003	RCD Mallorca	2–2	Real Valladolid	Palma de Mallorca
21:00 CET	Lozano 12'; Pandiani 56'	Report (in Spanish)	Moré 30'; Pachón 84'	Stadium: Son Moix; Attendance: 7,074; Referee: Javier Moreno Delgado

8 January 2003	Real Unión	0–4	CA Osasuna	Irun
21:00 CET		Report (in Spanish)	Arteaga 32' (o.g.); Brit 45', 70'; Gancedo 63'	Stadium: Gal; Attendance: 3,000; Referee: Carlos Megía Dávila

8 January 2003	CD Numancia	1–3	Sevilla FC	Soria
21:00 CET	Miguel Pérez 46'	Report (in Spanish)	Torrado 42'; Reyes 63'; Fredi 70'	Stadium: Los Pajaritos; Attendance: 4,000; Referee: Bernardino González Vázquez

8 January 2003	Xerez CD	0–1	Atlético Madrid	Jerez de la Frontera
21:00 CET		Report (in Spanish)	Albertini 29'	Stadium: Chapín; Attendance: 15,000; Referee: Julián Rodríguez Santiago

== Quarter-finals ==
Team 1	Agg.	Team 2	1st leg	2nd leg
Deportivo La Coruña	(a) 4–4	Real Murcia	1–0	3–4
Recreativo de Huelva	1–0	Atlético de Madrid	1–0	0–0
Sevilla FC	3–4	CA Osasuna	1–1	2–3
Real Madrid	1–5	RCD Mallorca	1–1	0–4

=== First leg ===
22 January 2003	Deportivo La Coruña	1–0	Real Murcia	A Coruña
20:45 CET	Duscher 84'	Report (in Spanish)		Stadium: Riazor; Attendance: 20,000; Referee: Alfonso Pérez Burrull

22 January 2003	Sevilla FC	1–1	CA Osasuna	Seville
21:00 CET	Reyes 10'	Report (in Spanish)	Javi Navarro 30' (o.g.)	Stadium: Ramón Sánchez Pizjuán; Attendance: 9,000; Referee: José Javier Losantos Omar

22 January 2003	Recreativo de Huelva	1–0	Atlético Madrid	Huelva
21:00 CET	Viqueira 52'	Report (in Spanish)		Stadium: Nuevo Colombino; Attendance: 8,000; Referee: Eduardo Iturralde González

23 January 2003	Real Madrid	1–1	RCD Mallorca	Madrid
21:30 CET	Portillo 12'	Report (in Spanish)	Nadal 57'	Stadium: Santiago Bernabéu; Attendance: 30,000; Referee: Manuel Mejuto González

=== Second leg ===
28 January 2003	Atlético Madrid	0–0	Recreativo de Huelva	Madrid
21:30 CET		Report (in Spanish)		Stadium: Vicente Calderón; Attendance: 14,250; Referee: Bernardino González Vázquez

29 January 2003	RCD Mallorca	4–0	Real Madrid	Palma de Mallorca
21:00 CET	Niño 7'; Eto'o 30', 35'; Pandiani 48'	Report (in Spanish)		Stadium: Son Moix; Attendance: 30,000; Referee: Jesús Téllez Sánchez

29 January 2003	CA Osasuna	3–2 (a.e.t.)	Sevilla FC	Pamplona
21:00 CET	Puñal 76'; Palacios 98'; Muñoz 114' (pen.)	Report (in Spanish)	Antoñito 88'; Casquero 106'	Stadium: El Sadar; Attendance: 14,000; Referee: César Muñiz Fernández

30 January 2003	Real Murcia	4–3	Deportivo La Coruña	Murcia
21:30 CET	Karanka 44'; Juanma 46'; Tito 52' (pen.); Albiol 83'	Report (in Spanish)	Tristán 24', 28'; Manuel Pablo 57'	Stadium: La Condomina; Attendance: 16,000; Referee: Luis Medina Cantalejo

== Semi-finals ==
Team 1	Agg.	Team 2	1st leg	2nd leg
Deportivo La Coruña	3–4	RCD Mallorca	2–3	1–1
Recreativo de Huelva	4–2	CA Osasuna	2–0	2–2

=== First leg ===
5 February 2003	Deportivo La Coruña	2–3	RCD Mallorca	A Coruña
21:30 CET	Tristán 89' (pen.); Makaay 90+'	Report (in Spanish)	Pandiani 38', 80'; Eto'o 81'	Stadium: Riazor; Attendance: 26,000; Referee: Víctor José Esquinas Torres

6 February 2003	Recreativo de Huelva	2–0	CA Osasuna	Huelva
21:30 CET	Benítez 17'; Raúl Molina 90+'	Report (in Spanish)		Stadium: Nuevo Colombino; Attendance: 10,000; Referee: Julián Rodríguez Santiago

=== Second leg ===
5 March 2003	RCD Mallorca	1–1	Deportivo La Coruña	Palma de Mallorca
21:30 CET	Ibagaza 83'	Report (in Spanish)	Fran 20'	Stadium: Son Moix; Attendance: 18,960; Referee: Manuel Mejuto González

5 March 2003	CA Osasuna	2–2	Recreativo de Huelva	Pamplona
20:30 CET	Aloisi 22'; Moha 43'	Report (in Spanish)	Xisco 47'; Benítez 50'	Stadium: El Sadar; Attendance: 17,000; Referee: Fernando Carmona Méndez

== Final ==
28 June 2003
21:00 CEST

Recreativo de Huelva	0–3	RCD Mallorca
	Report 1 Report 2	Pandiani 21' (pen.); Eto'o 72', 84'

Estadio Manuel Martínez Valero, Elche
Attendance: 39.000
Referee: Eduardo Iturralde González

== Top goalscorers ==
Player	Goals	Team
(Spain) Javier Portillo	8	Real Madrid
(Spain) Diego Tristán	6	Deportivo La Coruña
(Uruguay) Walter Pandiani	5	Mallorca
(Spain) Tote	5	Real Madrid
(Cameroon) Samuel Eto'o	5	Mallorca
(Spain) Antonio Madrigal	5	Novelda
(Spain) Albert Luque	4	Deportivo La Coruña
(Spain) Rubén Navarro	4	Alavés
(Argentina) Gastón Casas	3	Betis
(Spain) Asier Garitano	3	Alicante
