= Navarre autonomous football team =

Spanish regional team

Navarre
- Nickname: Selección Navarra
- Association: Federación Navarra de Fútbol
- Head coach: Pedro María Zabalza
First colours

First international
- Navarre 4 – 0 Burkina Faso (28 December 2003)

Biggest win
- Navarre 4 – 0 Burkina Faso (28 December 2003)

The Navarre autonomous football team is the regional football team for Navarre, Spain. It is not affiliated with FIFA or UEFA because it is represented internationally by the Spain national team, and only plays in friendly matches.

== History ==
The Navarre Football Federation created its selection in 2003. Until then, the Navarran players had been playing for the Basque national team. The Navarre national team played their first international game on 28 December 2003, debuting against Burkina Faso. The match ended in a 4-0 win, with the author of the team's first-ever goal being Txiki Acaz, while De Carlos scored a brace. They followed it up with two more matches in the next two years, both also being held in December. In 2004 they beat Morocco 2-1 with another goal from De Carlos and in their last match on 26 December 2005, they managed to keep their 100% winning status by defeating China PR 1-0, with the hero of the game being Iñaki Muñoz, who netted the lonely goal in the second-half.

== Selected internationals ==
28 December 2003	Navarre	4–0	Burkina Faso	Pamplona
	Txiki Acaz 65'; De Carlos 41', 84'; Palacios 52'	Report		Stadium: El Sadar Stadium; Attendance: 4,000; Referee: Undiano Mallenco

29 December 2004	Navarre	2–1	Morocco	Pamplona
	De Carlos 35'; Nagore 60' (pen.)	Report	Houssine 56'	Stadium: El Sadar Stadium; Attendance: 3,500; Referee: Undiano Mallenco

26 December 2005	Navarre	1–0	China	Pamplona
	Muñoz 65'	Report		Stadium: El Sadar Stadium; Attendance: 6,000

== List of players ==
Player name	Pos	Years	Caps	Goals
Gorka de Carlos (es)	FW	2003–2005	3	3
Iñaki Muñoz (Note: Also played for the unofficial Basque Country team.)	MF	2003–2005	3	1
Txomin Nagore	MF	2003–2005	3	1
César Palacios	MF	2003–2005	3	1
Txiki (eu)	MF	2003–2005	3	1
Javier López Vallejo	GK	2003–2005	3	0
José Manuel Yanguas (es)	DF	2003–2005	3	0
Irurzun	FW	2003–2005	3	0
Josetxo	DF	2003–2005	3	0
César Cruchaga	DF	2003–2005	3	0
Patxi Puñal	MF	2003–2004	2	0
Chema	MF	2003–2004	2	0
José Manuel Mateo	DF	2003–2004	2	0
Jesús María Lacruz	DF	2003–2005	2	0
Pablo Lusarreta	DF	2003–2005	2	0
Juantxo Elía	GK	2004–2005	2	0
Miguel Flaño	DF	2004–2005	2	0
Javier Lezaun	FW	2004–2005	2	0
Raúl García (Note: Also a full FIFA international with Spain.)	MF	2004–2005	2	0
Javi Gracia	MF	2003	1	0
Francisco Javier Jusué	DF	2003	1	0
Iñigo Larrainzar	DF	2003	1	0
Ricardo Sanzol	GK	2003	1	0
Aitor Santos	MF	2003	1	0
Raúl Iturralde	DF	2004	1	0
Pablo Orbaiz	MF	2005	1	0
Carlos Gurpegui	MF	2005	1	0
Fran Moreno	MF	2005	1	0
Javier Flaño	DF	2005	1	0

== Navarre women's autonomous football team ==
=== Results ===
22 December 2017	Navarre	1–3	Catalonia	Pamplona
18:30	Oroz 19'	Report	Bonmatí 21'; Férez 61', 63'	Stadium: El Sadar; Referee: David Recio

23 December 2025	Asturias	0–1	Navarre	Avilés
18:00		Report	Zumárraga 20'	Stadium: Román Suárez Puerta; Attendance: 3,000; Referee: Sara Fernández Ceferino

== See also ==
- Basque Country national football team
- Basque Country women's national football team
- Category:Footballers from Navarre
