= 2005 Copa del Rey final =

- Event: 2004–05 Copa del Rey
Osasuna	Real Betis
1	2
- Date: 11 June 2005
- Venue: Vicente Calderón, Madrid
- Referee: Pérez Burrull
- Attendance: 55,000
- Weather: Scattered clouds 30 °C (86 °F)

The 2005 Copa del Rey final was the 103rd final of the Spanish cup competition, the Copa del Rey. The match was played at Vicente Calderón in Madrid, on 11 June 2005.

Real Betis beat Osasuna 2–1 in extra time, to win the tournament for the second time.

== Match details ==
11 June 2005
21:00 CEST

Osasuna	1–2	Real Betis
Aloisi 82'	Report	Oliveira 74'; Dani 114'

Vicente Calderón, Madrid
Attendance: 55,000
Referee: Pérez Burrull (Cantabria)

Osasuna	Real Betis

GK	13	(Spain) Juan Elía
DF	17	(Spain) Unai Expósito	(yellow card) 88'
DF	7	(Spain) César Cruchaga (c)	(yellow card) 92'
DF	14	(Spain) Josetxo
DF	3	(Spain) Rafael Clavero	(yellow card) 41'
MF	21	(Cape Verde) Valdo
MF	5	(Uruguay) Pablo García	(yellow card) 65' (red card) 121'
MF	10	(Spain) Francisco Puñal		(substituted off) 77'
MF	23	(France) Ludovic Delporte
FW	15	(Cameroon) Pierre Webó		(substituted off) 79'
FW	18	(Uruguay) Richard Morales	(yellow card) 14'	(substituted off) 72'
Substitutes:
GK	1	(Spain) Ricardo Sanzol
DF	6	(Spain) Carlos Cuéllar
MF	22	(Spain) Iñaki Muñoz
MF	16	(Spain) David López		(substituted on) 77'
MF	11	(Morocco) Moha
FW	9	(Serbia and Montenegro) Savo Milošević		(substituted on) 72'
FW	20	(Australia) John Aloisi		(substituted on) 79'
Manager:
(Mexico) Javier Aguirre

GK	30	(Spain) Toni Doblas
DF	27	(Spain) Melli	(yellow card) 61'
DF	4	(Spain) Juanito (c)	(yellow card) 95'
DF	5	(Spain) David Rivas	(yellow card) 17'	(substituted off) 78'
DF	2	(Spain) Luis Fernández
MF	17	(Spain) Joaquín
MF	20	(Brazil) Marcos Assunção
MF	8	(Spain) Arzu		(substituted off) 68'
MF	9	(Spain) Fernando
FW	24	(Brazil) Edu		(substituted off) 89'
FW	12	(Brazil) Ricardo Oliveira
Substitutes:
GK	13	(Spain) Pedro Contreras
DF	3	(Uruguay) Alejandro Lembo		(substituted on) 78'
MF	10	(Spain) Juan José Cañas
MF	23	(Equatorial Guinea) Benjamín
MF	7	(Spain) Fernando Varela	(yellow card) 101'	(substituted on) 68'
MF	11	(Brazil) Denílson
FW	6	(Spain) Dani		(substituted on) 89'
Manager:
(Spain) Lorenzo Serra Ferrer

Match rules

- 90 minutes
- 30 minutes of extra time if necessary
- Penalty shoot-out if scores still level
- Seven named substitutes
- Maximum of three substitutions
