= 2010–11 Real Madrid CF season =

Real Madrid
2010–11 season
- President: Florentino Pérez
- Head coach: José Mourinho
- Stadium: Santiago Bernabéu
- La Liga: 2nd
- Copa del Rey: Winners
- UEFA Champions League: Semi-finals
- Top goalscorer: League: Cristiano Ronaldo (40); All: Cristiano Ronaldo (53)
- Highest home attendance: 80,000 vs Atlético Madrid (7 November 2010) vs Sevilla (19 December 2010) vs Barcelona (16 April 2011)
- Lowest home attendance: 44,000 vs Levante (22 December 2010)
- Biggest win: Real Madrid 8–0 Levante
- Biggest defeat: Barcelona 5–0 Real Madrid
Home colours	Away colours	Third colours

The 2010–11 season was Real Madrid Club de Fútbol's 80th season in La Liga. This article shows player statistics and all matches (official and friendly) that the club played during the 2010–11 season.

The rebuilt Madrid under star manager José Mourinho successfully fought on all fronts, going toe to toe with a brilliant Barcelona side which some regard as the greatest team in football history. Ultimately, Madrid finished second in the league, with 92 points and four behind their perennial rivals, defeated them in the Copa del Rey final, and lost to Barça in the Champions League semi-finals, where Real progressed to for the first time since 2002–03. Moreover, from 16 April through 3 May, a rare occurrence happened when, for the first time ever, four Clásicos were to be played in a span of just 18 days. The first fixture was in the league campaign on 16 April (which ended 1–1 with penalty goals for both sides), the second one was in the Copa del Rey final (which was won by Madrid 1–0 a.e.t., bringing them their first trophy in the second Galáctico era) on 20 April and the third and fourth ones in the two-legged Champions League semi-finals on 27 April and 3 May (Barcelona won on aggregate with a 2–0 away victory and a 1–1 home draw). The matches in the Champions League proved the most controversial, as multiple refereeing decisions were harshly criticized by Mourinho and Madrid players who accused UEFA of favoring the Catalan side. Namely, Pepe's red card in the 61st minute of the first leg was questioned, after which Barcelona scored two goals, with Mourinho being ejected and subsequently banned for the second leg for protesting, and several controversial offside calls were made, as well as Real having a goal disallowed in the second leg, when the score was tied 0–0. Madrid again became the highest scoring team in La Liga, with 102 goals, repeating its output from the previous season, with Cristiano Ronaldo scoring a record 40 and winning the European Golden Shoe.

This season was the first since 1993–94 without Raúl, who departed to join Schalke 04 after his contract was terminated, having stayed at the club for sixteen years and the first since 1994–95 without Guti who departed to join Beşiktaş.

== Club ==
=== Coaching staff ===
Position	Staff
Head Coach	(Portugal) José Mourinho
Assistant Coach	(Spain) Aitor Karanka
Fitness Trainer	(Portugal) Rui Faria
Goalkeeper Coach	(Portugal) Silvino Louro
Technical Assistant	(Portugal) José Morais

=== Kit ===
Supplier: Adidas
Sponsor(s): bwin

Home	Away	Third

Source: "The new shirt of Real Madrid 2010/11". Real Madrid C.F. Archived from the original on 1 August 2010.
"Real Madrid Home Jersey". Adidas.com. Archived from the original on 16 August 2010.
"Real Madrid UEFA Champions League Away Shirt 2010/11". Realmadridshop.com. Archived from the original on 23 September 2010.

=== Other information ===
President	Florentino Pérez
Honorary Life President	Alfredo Di Stéfano
1st Vice-president	Fernando Fernández Tapias
2nd Vice-president	Eduardo Fernández de Blas
Secretary of the Board	Enrique Sánchez González
Director General	Jorge Valdano
Director General of the President's Office	Manuel Redondo
Director of Institutional Relations	Emilio Butragueño
Advisor to the President	Zinedine Zidane
Sporting Director	Miguel Pardeza
Director of the Social Area	José Luis Sánchez
Director of the Legal Advisory Board	Javier López Farre
Ground (capacity and dimensions)	Santiago Bernabéu (80,354 / 105x68m)
Training ground	Ciudad Real Madrid

Source: Board of Directors (Realmadrid), El club más laureado del mundo

== Players ==
=== Squad information ===
N	Pos.	Nat.	Name	Age	EU	Since	App	Goals	Ends	Transfer fee	Notes
1	GK	(Spain)	Iker Casillas (captain)	30	EU	1999	572	0	2017	Youth system	
2	CB	(Portugal)	Ricardo Carvalho	33	EU	2010	48	3	2012	€8M	
3	CB	(Portugal)	Pepe	28	EU	2007	112	2	2024	€30M	Second nationality: Brazil
4	RB	(Spain)	Sergio Ramos (VC)	25	EU	2005	262	32	2016	€28M	
5	CM	(Argentina)	Fernando Gago	25	EU	2007 (Winter)	121	1	2013	€20M	
6	FW	(Togo)	Emmanuel Adebayor	27	EU	2011 (Winter)	22	8	2011	N/A	#28 in UCL
7	LW	(Portugal)	Cristiano Ronaldo	26	EU	2009	89	87	2015	€94M	
8	AM	(Brazil)	Kaká	29	EU	2009	53	16	2015	€65M	Second nationality: Italy
9	ST	(France)	Karim Benzema	23	EU	2009	81	35	2015	€35M + €6M in variables	Second nationality: Algeria
10	DM	(France)	Lassana Diarra	26	EU	2009 (Winter)	90	1	2013	€20M	
11	CM	(Spain)	Esteban Granero	23	EU	2009	68	5	2013	€4.5M	Originally from Youth system
12	LB	(Brazil)	Marcelo (VC)	23	EU	2007 (Winter)	165	13	2015	€6.5M	Second nationality: Spain
13	GK	(Spain)	Antonio Adán	24	EU	2009	5	0	2014	Youth system	
14	CM	(Spain)	Xabi Alonso	29	EU	2009	93	4	2014	€30M	
16	AM	(Spain)	Sergio Canales	20	EU	2010	15	0	2016	€4.5M	
17	RB	(Spain)	Álvaro Arbeloa	28	EU	2009	85	3	2014	€4.5M	Originally from Youth system
18	CB	(Spain)	Raúl Albiol	25	EU	2009	75	1	2014	€15M	
19	CB	(Argentina)	Ezequiel Garay	24	Non-EU	2008	31	1	2014	€10M	
20	ST	(Argentina)	Gonzalo Higuaín (VC)	23	EU	2007 (Winter)	166	77	2016	€13M	Second nationality: France
21	RW	(Spain)	Pedro León	24	EU	2010	14	2	2016	€10M	
22	RW	(Argentina)	Ángel Di María	23	EU	2010	53	9	2016	€25M + €11M in variables	
23	AM	(Germany)	Mesut Özil	22	EU	2010	53	10	2016	€15M	Second nationality: Turkey
24	DM	(Germany)	Sami Khedira	24	EU	2010	40	0	2016	€12M	Second nationality: Tunisia
25	GK	(Poland)	Jerzy Dudek	38	EU	2007	12	0	2011	Free	
26	LW	(Spain)	Juan Carlos	21	EU	2010	1	0		Youth system	
27	RB	(Spain)	Juanfran	22	EU	2010	2	0	2013	Youth system	
28	GK	(Spain)	Jesús	23	EU	2011	1	0		Youth system	
29	ST	(Spain)	Álvaro Morata	18	EU	2010	2	0	2014	Youth system	
30	CM	(Spain)	Álex	18	EU	2010	1	0		Youth system	#30 in UCL
33	LW	(Spain)	Pablo Sarabia	19	EU	2010	1	0	2013	Youth system	
35	LB	(Spain)	Nacho	21	EU	2010	2	0	2012	Youth system	
39	ST	(Spain)	Joselu	21	EU	2011	1	1		Youth system	
40	GK	(Spain)	Tomás Mejías	22	EU	2011	1	0		Youth system	

- Last updated: 1 July 2011
- Source: realmadrid.com, Wikipedia players' articles, ESPN (for appearances and goals), realmadrid.com (for players' numbers) and soccer-spain.com, sportec.es, footballdatabase (for EU passport)
- Ordered by position on pitch.

=== Transfers ===
==== In ====
No.	Pos.	Nat.	Name	Age	EU	Moving from	Type	Transfer window	Ends	Transfer fee	Source
16	AM	(Spain)	Sergio Canales	19	EU	Racing Santander	Transfer	Summer	2016	€4.5M	Realmadrid.com
22	RW	(Argentina)	Ángel Di María	22	EU	Benfica (Portugal)	Transfer	Summer	2016	€25M	Realmadrid.com
21	RW	(Spain)	Pedro León	23	EU	Getafe	Transfer	Summer	2016	€10M	Realmadrid.com
24	DM	(Germany)	Sami Khedira	23	EU	VfB Stuttgart (Germany)	Transfer	Summer	2016	€12M	Realmadrid.com
2	CB	(Portugal)	Ricardo Carvalho	32	EU	Chelsea (England)	Transfer	Summer	2012	€8M	Realmadrid.com
23	AM	(Germany)	Mesut Özil	21	EU	Werder Bremen (Germany)	Transfer	Summer	2016	€15M	Realmadrid.com
15	CB	(Spain)	David Mateos	23	EU	Youth system	Promoted	Summer	2011	Youth system	Realmadrid.com
6	FW	(Togo)	Emmanuel Adebayor	26	EU	Manchester City (England)	Loan	Winter	2011	N/A	Realmadrid.com

Total spending: ▼€74.5 million

==== Out ====
No.	Pos.	Nat.	Name	Age	EU	Moving to	Type	Transfer window	Transfer fee	Source
21	DF	(Germany)	Christoph Metzelder	29	EU	Schalke 04 (Germany)	End of contract	Summer	Free	Schalke04.de
14	MF	(Spain)	Guti	33	EU	Beşiktaş (Turkey)	Contract cancellation	Summer	Free	BeşiktaşJK.com
7	SS	(Spain)	Raúl	33	EU	Schalke 04 (Germany)	Contract cancellation	Summer	Free	Schalke04.de
15	LM	(Netherlands)	Royston Drenthe	23	EU	Hércules	Loan	Summer	N/A	Realmadrid.com
23	AM	(Netherlands)	Rafael van der Vaart	27	EU	Tottenham Hotspur (England)	Transfer	Summer	€11M	tottenhamhotspur.com
6	DM	(Mali)	Mahamadou Diarra	29	EU	Monaco (France)	Transfer	Winter	Free	Realmadrid.com
15	CB	(Spain)	David Mateos	23	EU	AEK Athens (Greece)	Loan	Winter	N/A	Realmadrid.com

Total income: ▲€16 million, (€5M from Antonio Cassano to Milan transfer)

=== Long-term injury list ===
Date	Player	Injury	Estimated date of return

Last updated: 1 April 2011
Source: Realmadrid.com

== Pre-season and friendlies ==
4 August 2010 US Tour	América	2–3	Real Madrid	San Francisco, California, United States
20:00 PDT	Mosquera (yellow card) 21'; Esqueda 53', (yellow card) 81'; V. Sánchez 61'	Report	Canales 34'; Higuaín 63'; Ronaldo 80'; Garay (yellow card) 85'	Stadium: Candlestick Park; Attendance: 47,338; Referee: Jair Marrufo (United States)

7 August 2010 US Tour	Los Angeles Galaxy	2–3	Real Madrid	Pasadena, California, United States
19:30 PDT	Dunivant 40'; Donovan 45+1' (pen.); Berhalter (yellow card) 57'	Report	Higuaín 52', 62'; León 71'	Stadium: Rose Bowl; Attendance: 89,134; Referee: Arkadiusz Prus (United States)

13 August 2010 Beckenbauer Cup	Bayern Munich	0–0 (2–4 p)	Real Madrid	Munich, Germany
21:00 CEST		Report	Carvalho (yellow card) 84'	Stadium: Allianz Arena; Attendance: 69,000; Referee: Wolfgang Stark (Germany)
	Penalties
	Badstuber (penalty scored); Altıntop (penalty missed); Ottl (penalty scored); Braafheid (penalty missed)		(penalty scored) Ronaldo; (penalty scored) Van der Vaart; (penalty scored) Alonso; (penalty scored) Benzema

17 August 2010 European Tour	Standard Liège	1–1	Real Madrid	Liège, Belgium
19:00 CEST	Benteke 77'	Report	Van der Vaart 13'; Higuaín (yellow card) 43'	Stadium: Stade Maurice Dufrasne; Attendance: 30,000; Referee: Serge Gumienny (Belgium)

22 August 2010 Ciudad de Alicante Trophy	Hércules	1–3	Real Madrid	Alicante, Spain
22:00 CEST	Sendoa 39'	Report	Benzema 56', 81'; Di María 76'; León (red card) 83'	Stadium: Estadio José Rico Pérez; Attendance: 13,000; Referee: Mateu Lahoz (Spain)

24 August 2010 Bernabéu Trophy	Real Madrid	2–0	Peñarol	Madrid, Spain
22:15 CEST	Carvalho (yellow card) 33'; León (yellow card) 51'; Di María 68'; Van der Vaart 90+2' (pen.)	Report		Stadium: Estadio Santiago Bernabéu; Attendance: 70,000; Referee: Ramírez Domínguez (Spain); Man of the Match: Di María

9 February 2011 Practice	Real Madrid C	1–2	Real Madrid	Madrid, Spain
	Oscar Plano	Report	Canales; Kaká 69'	Stadium: Ciudad Real Madrid

18 May 2011 Friendly	Murcia	2–2	Real Madrid	Murcia, Spain
19:00 CEST	Pepe 54' (o.g.); Meca 66'	Report	Benzema 49'; Ronaldo 69'	Stadium: Estadio Nueva Condomina; Attendance: 32,000; Referee: Gregorio Bernabé García (Spain)

Last updated: 24 May 2011
Source: Preseason, US Tour, US & European Tour, Santiago Bernabéu Trophy, Real Madrid in support of Murcia and Lorca

== Competitions ==
=== La Liga ===
==== League table ====
Pos	Team	Pld	W	D	L	GF	GA	GD	Pts	Qualification or relegation
1	Barcelona (C)	38	30	6	2	95	21	+74	96	Qualification for the Champions League group stage
2	Real Madrid	38	29	5	4	102	33	+69	92	Qualification for the Champions League group stage
3	Valencia	38	21	8	9	64	44	+20	71	Qualification for the Champions League group stage
4	Villarreal	38	18	8	12	54	44	+10	62	Qualification for the Champions League play-off round
5	Sevilla	38	17	7	14	62	61	+1	58 (Note: SEV: 7 pts; ATH: 6 pts; ATM: 4 pts)	Qualification for the Europa League play-off round

Source: LFP, sportec.es, Yahoo! Sport
Rules for classification: 1st points; 2nd head-to-head points; 3rd head-to-head goal difference; 4th head-to-head goals scored; 5th goal difference; 6th number of goals scored; 7th Fair-play points
(C) Champions

==== Results by round ====
Round	1	2	3	4	5	6	7	8	9	10	11	12	13	14	15	16	17	18	19	20	21	22	23	24	25	26	27	28	29	30	31	32	33	34	35	36	37	38
Ground	A	H	A	H	A	H	A	H	A	H	A	H	A	H	A	H	A	H	A	H	A	H	A	H	A	H	A	H	A	H	A	H	A	H	A	H	A	H
Result	D	W	W	W	D	W	W	W	W	W	W	W	L	W	W	W	W	W	D	W	L	W	W	W	D	W	W	W	W	L	W	D	W	L	W	W	W	W
Position	10	5	3	1	4	3	1	1	1	1	1	1	2	2	2	2	2	2	2	2	2	2	2	2	2	2	2	2	2	2	2	2	2	2	2	2	2	2

Updated to match(es) played on 21 May 2011. Source: Competitive matches
A = Away; H = Home; W = Win; D = Draw; L = Loss

==== Matches ====
Win Draw Loss Postponed

29 August 2010 1	Mallorca	0–0	Real Madrid	Palma
21:00 CEST (UTC+02:00)	Sergi (yellow card) 33'; Cendrós (yellow card) 86'	Report	Alonso (yellow card) 16'; Granero (yellow card) 86'	Stadium: Iberostar Estadio; Attendance: 22,669; Referee: David Fernández Borbalán (Andalusia)

11 September 2010 2	Real Madrid	1–0	Osasuna	Madrid
20:00 CEST (UTC+02:00)	Carvalho 48'; Ronaldo (yellow card) 53'; Marcelo (yellow card) 83'	Report	Puñal (yellow card) 19'; Aranda (yellow card) 44'	Stadium: Estadio Santiago Bernabéu; Attendance: 68,000; Referee: Fernando Teixeira Vitienes (Cantabria); Man of the Match: Carvalho, Özil

18 September 2010 3	Real Sociedad	1–2	Real Madrid	San Sebastián
22:00 CEST (UTC+02:00)	Tamudo 61'; González (yellow card) 85'	Report	Pepe (yellow card) 25', (goal) 74'; Ramos (yellow card) 50'; Di María 51'	Stadium: Estadio Anoeta; Attendance: 30,000; Referee: Antonio Mateu Lahoz (Valencian Community); Man of the Match: Di María, Alonso

21 September 2010 4	Real Madrid	3–0	Espanyol	Madrid
22:00 CEST (UTC+02:00)	Carvalho (yellow card) 15'; Marcelo (yellow card) 22'; Ronaldo 28' (pen.); Pepe (yellow card) 56' (yellow-red card) 60'; Higuaín 79'; Benzema 87'	Report	García (yellow card) 26'; Galán (red card) 63'; Verdú (yellow card) 63'; Forlín (yellow card) 79' (yellow-red card) 88'	Stadium: Estadio Santiago Bernabéu; Attendance: 70,000; Referee: Carlos Clos Gómez (Aragon); Man of the Match: Ronaldo, Higuaín

25 September 2010 5	Levante	0–0	Real Madrid	Valencia
20:00 CEST (UTC+02:00)	Cerra (yellow card) 72'; Del Horno (yellow card) 74'; Jordà (yellow card) 80'; Ballesteros (yellow card) 83'; Xisco (yellow card) 88'	Report	Di María (yellow card) 12'; Ramos (yellow card) 28'	Stadium: Estadi Ciutat de València; Attendance: 18,326; Referee: Carlos Delgado Ferreiro (Basque Country); Man of the Match: Carvalho

3 October 2010 6	Real Madrid	6–1	Deportivo La Coruña	Madrid
21:00 CEST (UTC+02:00)	Ronaldo 4', 89'; Özil 24'; Di María 34'; Higuaín 53'; Castro 60' (o.g.)	Report	Lopo (yellow card) 3'; Rodríguez 78'	Stadium: Estadio Santiago Bernabéu; Attendance: 67,000; Referee: Eduardo Iturralde González (Basque Country); Man of the Match: Ronaldo, Higuaín

16 October 2010 7	Málaga	1–4	Real Madrid	Málaga
22:00 CEST (UTC+02:00)	Ramos (yellow card) 36'; Gámez (yellow card) 45+1'; Arnau (yellow card) 45+2'; Stadsgaard 55'; Fernando (yellow card) 61'	Report	Khedira (yellow card) 15'; Higuaín 30', 65'; Ronaldo 45', 50' (pen.); Arbeloa (yellow card) 60'; Canales (yellow card) 89'	Stadium: Estadio La Rosaleda; Attendance: 30,000; Referee: Alberto Undiano Mallenco (Navarre); Man of the Match: Ronaldo, Higuaín

23 October 2010 8	Real Madrid	6–1	Racing Santander	Madrid
20:00 CEST (UTC+02:00)	Higuaín 10'; Ronaldo 15', 27', 47', 55' (pen.); Özil 63'; Canales (yellow card) 77'; Arbeloa (yellow card) 83'	Report	Cisma (yellow card) 49'; Arana (yellow card) 65'; Rosenberg 73'	Stadium: Estadio Santiago Bernabéu; Attendance: 60,000; Referee: César Muñiz Fernández (Asturias); Man of the Match: Ronaldo, Di María

30 October 2010 9	Hércules	1–3	Real Madrid	Alicante
20:00 CEST (UTC+02:00)	Trezeguet 3'	Report	Di María 52'; Alonso (yellow card) 66'; Marcelo (yellow card) 73'; Carvalho (yellow card) 78'; Ronaldo 82', 86'	Stadium: Estadio José Rico Pérez; Attendance: 30,000; Referee: Carlos Clos Gómez (Aragon); Man of the Match: Ronaldo, Benzema

7 November 2010 10	Real Madrid	2–0	Atlético Madrid	Madrid
21:00 CET (UTC+01:00)	Carvalho 13', (yellow card) 76'; Özil 19'; Khedira (yellow card) 72'	Report	Suárez (yellow card) 61'; Tiago (yellow card) 66'	Stadium: Estadio Santiago Bernabéu; Attendance: 80,000; Referee: Antonio Mateu Lahoz (Valencian Community); Man of the Match: Carvalho, Alonso

14 November 2010 11	Sporting Gijón	0–1	Real Madrid	Gijón
19:00 CET (UTC+01:00)	Castro (yellow card) 11'; Carmelo (yellow card) 45+1'; Eguren (yellow card) 72'; Lora (yellow card) 86'; De las Cuevas (yellow card) 88'; Botía (red card) 90+4'	Report	Higuaín (yellow card) 35', (goal) 82'; Khedira (yellow card) 45+1'	Stadium: El Molinón; Attendance: 25,000; Referee: Javier Turienzo Álvarez (Castile and León); Man of the Match: Benzema, Casillas

20 November 2010 12	Real Madrid	5–1	Athletic Bilbao	Madrid
22:00 CET (UTC+01:00)	Alonso (yellow card) 13'; Higuaín 19'; Ronaldo 30', 62', 90+2' (pen.); Carvalho (yellow card) 53'; Ramos 57' (pen.)	Report	Llorente 40'; San José (yellow card) 50'; Amorebieta (yellow card) 61'	Stadium: Estadio Santiago Bernabéu; Attendance: 75,000; Referee: Alberto Undiano Mallenco (Navarre); Man of the Match: Ronaldo, Casillas

29 November 2010 13	Barcelona	5–0	Real Madrid	Barcelona
21:00 CET (UTC+01:00)	Xavi 10', (yellow card) 90+3'; Pedro 18'; Valdés (yellow card) 33'; Villa (yellow card) 34', (goal) 55', 58'; Messi (yellow card) 45'; Puyol (yellow card) 81'; Jeffrén 90+1'	Report	Ronaldo (yellow card) 33'; Pepe (yellow card) 36'; Alonso (yellow card) 51'; Marcelo (yellow card) 55'; Casillas (yellow card) 56'; Carvalho (yellow card) 71'; Ramos (yellow card) 73' (red card) 90+3'; Khedira (yellow card) 75'	Stadium: Camp Nou; Attendance: 98,255; Referee: Eduardo Iturralde González (Basque Country)

4 December 2010 14	Real Madrid	2–0	Valencia	Madrid
22:00 CET (UTC+01:00)	Pepe (yellow card) 10'; Khedira (yellow card) 33'; Ronaldo 73', 87'; Granero (yellow card) 76'	Report	Alba (yellow card) 9'; Albelda (yellow card) 10' (yellow-red card) 65'; Bruno (yellow card) 28'; T. Costa (yellow card) 39'; Joaquín (yellow card) 75'	Stadium: Estadio Santiago Bernabéu; Attendance: 79,000; Referee: Miguel Ángel Pérez Lasa (Basque Country); Man of the Match: Ronaldo, Di María

12 December 2010 15	Zaragoza	1–3	Real Madrid	Zaragoza
19:00 CET (UTC+01:00)	Gabi (yellow card) 33', (goal) 54' (pen.); Lanzaro (yellow card) 50'; Bertolo (yellow card) 79'	Report	Özil 15'; Arbeloa (yellow card) 25'; Marcelo (yellow card) 35'; Ronaldo 44'; Di María 47'; Carvalho (yellow card) 53'; Alonso (yellow card) 76'	Stadium: La Romareda; Attendance: 30,000; Referee: Rafael Ramírez Domínguez (Andalusia); Man of the Match: Ronaldo, Lass

19 December 2010 16	Real Madrid	1–0	Sevilla	Madrid
21:00 CET (UTC+01:00)	Carvalho (yellow card) 45+1' (yellow-red card) 63'; Di María (yellow card) 59', (goal) 76'; Casillas (yellow card) 63'; L. Diarra (yellow card) 70'; Pepe (yellow card) 70'; Özil (yellow card) 77'; León (yellow card) 87'; Ramos (yellow card) 89'	Report	Zokora (yellow card) 80'; Cáceres (yellow card) 85'; Acosta (yellow card) 89'; Dabo (red card) 90'	Stadium: Estadio Santiago Bernabéu; Attendance: 80,000; Referee: Carlos Clos Gómez (Aragon); Man of the Match: Di María, Pepe

3 January 2011 17	Getafe	2–3	Real Madrid	Getafe
22:00 CET (UTC+01:00)	Boateng (yellow card) 16'; Díaz (yellow card) 19'; Parejo 29', (yellow card) 40'; Miku (yellow card) 59'; Albín 86'; Mosquera (yellow card) 90+4'	Report	Ronaldo 11' (pen.), 57'; Özil 19'; L. Diarra (yellow card) 27'; Arbeloa (yellow card) 47' (yellow-red card) 82'; Khedira (yellow card) 51'; Di María (yellow card) 56'	Stadium: Coliseum Alfonso Pérez; Attendance: 15,000; Referee: Alberto Undiano Mallenco (Navarre); Man of the Match: Di María, Ronaldo

9 January 2011 18	Real Madrid	4–2	Villarreal	Madrid
19:00 CET (UTC+01:00)	Ronaldo 9', 45+1', 79'; Benzema (yellow card) 49'; Alonso (yellow card) 72'; Di María (yellow card) 78'; Kaká 82'	Report	Cani 7', (red card) 83'; Ruben 18'; Ángel (yellow card) 52'; Cazorla (yellow card) 76'; Bruno (yellow card) 78'; Capdevila (yellow card) 81'	Stadium: Estadio Santiago Bernabéu; Attendance: 72,000; Referee: David Fernández Borbalán (Andalusia); Man of the Match: Ronaldo, Kaká
Note: Cani was sent off (red card) after he was substituted for throwing a bottle at José Mourinho.

16 January 2011 19	Almería	1–1	Real Madrid	Almería
19:00 CET (UTC+01:00)	Uche (yellow card) 56'; Ulloa 60'; M'bami (yellow card) 90+3'	Report	Albiol (yellow card) 16'; Granero 77'; Özil (yellow card) 90+4'	Stadium: Estadio de los Juegos Mediterráneos; Attendance: 20,000; Referee: Miguel Ángel Pérez Lasa (Basque Country); Man of the Match: Granero

23 January 2011 20	Real Madrid	1–0	Mallorca	Madrid
19:00 CET (UTC+01:00)	Ramos (yellow card) 33'; Granero (yellow card) 54'; Benzema 61'; L. Diarra (yellow card) 84'	Report	Nsue (yellow card) 28'; Tejera (yellow card) 43'; Ramis (yellow card) 76'; Nunes (yellow card) 84'	Stadium: Estadio Santiago Bernabéu; Attendance: 73,000; Referee: Eduardo Iturralde González (Basque Country); Man of the Match: Benzema, Alonso

30 January 2011 21	Osasuna	1–0	Real Madrid	Pamplona
19:00 CET (UTC+01:00)	Soriano (yellow card) 15'; Coro (yellow card) 17'; Damià (yellow card) 51'; Camuñas 62', (yellow card) 80'; Aranda (yellow card) 67'; Puñal (yellow card) 70'; Nélson (yellow card) 87'; Vadócz (yellow card) 88'	Report	L. Diarra (yellow card) 7'; Ramos (yellow card) 87'; Khedira (yellow card) 90+1'	Stadium: Estadio El Sadar; Attendance: 19,000; Referee: César Muñiz Fernández (Asturias)

6 February 2011 22	Real Madrid	4–1	Real Sociedad	Madrid
19:00 CET (UTC+01:00)	Kaká 8'; Ronaldo 21', 42'; Alonso (yellow card) 55'; Albiol (yellow card) 82'; Adebayor 89'	Report	Prieto (yellow card) 10'; Rivas (yellow card) 27'; Arbeloa 72' (o.g.); Estrada (yellow card) 86'	Stadium: Estadio Santiago Bernabéu; Attendance: 70,000; Referee: Rafael Ramírez Domínguez (Andalusia); Man of the Match: Ronaldo, Kaká

13 February 2011 23	Espanyol	0–1	Real Madrid	Cornellà de Llobregat
21:00 CET (UTC+01:00)	Chica (yellow card) 50'; Amat (yellow card) 52'	Report	Casillas (red card) 2'; Alonso (yellow card) 20'; Marcelo 24'; Carvalho (yellow card) 66'	Stadium: Estadi Cornellà-El Prat; Attendance: 40,240; Referee: Antonio Mateu Lahoz (Valencian Community); Man of the Match: Marcelo, Alonso

19 February 2011 24	Real Madrid	2–0	Levante	Madrid
20:00 CET (UTC+01:00)	Benzema 6'; Ramos (yellow card) 31'; Carvalho 41'; L. Diarra (yellow card) 58'	Report	Caicedo (yellow card) 45+2'; Ballesteros (yellow card) 83'	Stadium: Estadio Santiago Bernabéu; Attendance: 63,000; Referee: Fernando Teixeira Vitienes (Cantabria); Man of the Match: Benzema, Di María

26 February 2011 25	Deportivo La Coruña	0–0	Real Madrid	A Coruña
22:00 CET (UTC+01:00)	Laure (yellow card) 71'; Pérez (yellow card) 75'; Sand (yellow card) 83'; Riki (yellow card) 90+1'	Report	Carvalho (yellow card) 50'; Granero (yellow card) 86'	Stadium: Estadio Riazor; Attendance: 36,400; Referee: David Fernández Borbalán (Andalusia); Man of the Match: Ronaldo

3 March 2011 26	Real Madrid	7–0	Málaga	Madrid
22:00 CET (UTC+01:00)	Benzema 27', 62'; L. Diarra (yellow card) 33'; Di María 36'; Marcelo 45'; Ronaldo 51', 68' (pen.), 77'	Report	Eliseu (yellow card) 29'; Demichelis (yellow card) 39'; Gaspar (yellow card) 61' (yellow-red card) 66'	Stadium: Estadio Santiago Bernabéu; Attendance: 51,000; Referee: Miguel Ángel Pérez Lasa (Basque Country); Man of the Match: Ronaldo, Benzema

6 March 2011 27	Racing Santander	1–3	Real Madrid	Santander
21:00 CET (UTC+01:00)	Rosenberg (yellow card) 53'; Kennedy 70'; Torrejón (yellow card) 84'	Report	Adebayor 23'; Benzema 27', 75'; Ramos (yellow card) 36'; Alonso (yellow card) 52'	Stadium: Campos de Sport de El Sardinero; Attendance: 20,000; Referee: Rafael Ramírez Domínguez (Andalusia); Man of the Match: Benzema, Özil

12 March 2011 28	Real Madrid	2–0	Hércules	Madrid
20:00 CET (UTC+01:00)	Benzema 24', 56'	Report	Pulhac (yellow card) 78'	Stadium: Estadio Santiago Bernabéu; Attendance: 72,000; Referee: Carlos Delgado Ferreiro (Basque Country); Man of the Match: Benzema, Di María

19 March 2011 29	Atlético Madrid	1–2	Real Madrid	Madrid
22:00 CET (UTC+01:00)	Agüero (yellow card) 34', (goal) 86'; Ujfaluši (yellow card) 37'	Report	Benzema 11'; Özil 32'; L. Diarra (yellow card) 63'; Marcelo (yellow card) 77'; Alonso (yellow card) 88'	Stadium: Estadio Vicente Calderón; Attendance: 54,000; Referee: Fernando Teixeira Vitienes (Cantabria); Man of the Match: Casillas, Özil

2 April 2011 30	Real Madrid	0–1	Sporting Gijón	Madrid
18:00 CEST (UTC+02:00)	Ramos (yellow card) 43'; Di María (yellow card) 63'; L. Diarra (yellow card) 74'; Albiol (yellow card) 81'	Report	José Ángel (yellow card) 39'; De las Cuevas 79'; Pablo (yellow card) 83'; Novo (yellow card) 86'	Stadium: Estadio Santiago Bernabéu; Attendance: 70,000; Referee: José Luis González González (Castile and León)

9 April 2011 31	Athletic Bilbao	0–3	Real Madrid	Bilbao
18:00 CEST (UTC+02:00)	Gurpegui (yellow card) 12'; Iraizoz (yellow card) 13'; Martínez (yellow card) 61'	Report	Kaká 14' (pen.), 54' (pen.); Granero (yellow card) 45+1'; Ramos (yellow card) 49'; L. Diarra (yellow card) 58'; Casillas (yellow card) 60'; Ronaldo 70'; Arbeloa (yellow card) 71'	Stadium: Estadio San Mamés; Attendance: 39,500; Referee: Carlos Clos Gómez (Aragon); Man of the Match: Kaká, Di María

16 April 2011 32	Real Madrid	1–1	Barcelona	Madrid
22:00 CEST (UTC+02:00)	Marcelo (yellow card) 31'; Albiol (red card) 51'; Arbeloa (yellow card) 76'; Ronaldo 82' (pen.)	Report	Adriano (yellow card) 9'; Piqué (yellow card) 27'; Messi 53' (pen.); Alves (yellow card) 79'; Valdés (yellow card) 81'; Xavi (yellow card) 90+2'	Stadium: Estadio Santiago Bernabéu; Attendance: 80,000; Referee: César Muñiz Fernández (Asturias); Man of the Match: Pepe, Özil

23 April 2011 33	Valencia	3–6	Real Madrid	Valencia
18:00 CEST (UTC+02:00)	Soldado 60'; Jonas 80', (yellow card) 89'; Alba 85'	Report	Benzema 23'; Higuaín 31', 42', 53'; Kaká 39', 62'	Stadium: Estadio Mestalla; Attendance: 53,000; Referee: Miguel Ángel Pérez Lasa (Basque Country); Man of the Match: Higuaín, Kaká

30 April 2011 34	Real Madrid	2–3	Zaragoza	Madrid
18:00 CEST (UTC+02:00)	Carvalho (yellow card) 54' (yellow-red card) 86'; Di María (yellow card) 58'; Ramos 62'; Benzema 85'	Report	Lafita 41', 77'; Jarošík (yellow card) 47'; Gabi 54' (pen.); López (yellow card) 57'; Doblas (yellow card) 57'; Diogo (yellow card) 87'	Stadium: Estadio Santiago Bernabéu; Attendance: 65,824; Referee: Miguel Ángel Ayza Gámez (Valencian Community)

7 May 2011 35	Sevilla	2–6	Real Madrid	Seville
22:00 CEST (UTC+02:00)	Sánchez (yellow card) 43'; Negredo 61', 84'; Romaric (yellow card) 81'	Report	Ramos 21', (yellow card) 41'; Ronaldo 31', 65', 70', 75'; Kaká 42'; L. Diarra (yellow card) 88'	Stadium: Estadio Ramón Sánchez Pizjuán; Attendance: 44,000; Referee: Antonio Mateu Lahoz (Valencian Community); Man of the Match: Ronaldo

10 May 2011 36	Real Madrid	4–0	Getafe	Madrid
22:00 CEST (UTC+02:00)	Ronaldo 24', 58', 90+2' (pen.); Carvalho (yellow card) 62'; Benzema 77'; L. Diarra (yellow card) 81'	Report	Boateng (yellow card) 68'; Mané (yellow card) 75'; Arizmendi (yellow card) 90+4'	Stadium: Estadio Santiago Bernabéu; Attendance: 70,000; Referee: Rafael Ramírez Domínguez (Andalusia); Man of the Match: Ronaldo

15 May 2011 37	Villarreal	1–3	Real Madrid	Villarreal
21:00 CEST (UTC+02:00)	Cani 51', (yellow card) 57'; Valero (yellow card) 55'; Marchena (yellow card) 57'; Capdevila (yellow card) 70'; Bruno (yellow card) 85'	Report	Marcelo 17'; Ronaldo 22', 90+3'; Alonso (yellow card) 77'	Stadium: Estadio El Madrigal; Attendance: 19,530; Referee: Alberto Undiano Mallenco (Navarre); Man of the Match: Ronaldo, Marcelo

21 May 2011 38	Real Madrid	8–1	Almería	Madrid
20:00 CEST (UTC+02:00)	Ronaldo 4', 77'; Adebayor 31', 52', 73'; Benzema 48', 63'; Alonso (yellow card) 50'; Joselu 87'	Report	Uche 33'; Juanma (yellow card) 64'	Stadium: Estadio Santiago Bernabéu; Attendance: 50,000; Referee: Ignacio Iglesias Villanueva (Galicia); Man of the Match: Ronaldo, Adebayor

Last updated: 21 May 2011
Source: realmadrid.com, LFP, La Liga Schedule, La Liga

=== Copa del Rey ===
==== Round of 32 ====
26 October 2010 First leg	Murcia	0–0	Real Madrid	Murcia
20:00 CEST (UTC+02:00)	Aquino (yellow card) 44'; Carles (yellow card) 90+1'	Report	M. Diarra (yellow card) 20'; Canales (yellow card) 74'	Stadium: Estadio Nueva Condomina; Attendance: 20,674; Referee: Miguel Ángel Ayza Gámez (Valencian Community); Man of the Match: Ronaldo

10 November 2010 Second leg	Real Madrid	5–1 (5–1 agg.)	Murcia	Madrid
20:00 CET (UTC+01:00)	Granero 4', (yellow card) 11'; Canales (yellow card) 15'; Arbeloa (yellow card) 30' (yellow-red card) 80'; Diarra (yellow card) 38'; Higuaín 44'; Ronaldo 75'; Alonso (yellow card) 81', (goal) 89'; Benzema 85' (pen.)	Report	Albiol (yellow card) 23'; Góngora (yellow card) 45+1'; Marín (yellow card) 56'; Pedro 82' (pen.); Urzaiz (yellow card) 88'; Cañadas (yellow card) 89'	Stadium: Estadio Santiago Bernabéu; Attendance: 76,000; Referee: José Luis Paradas Romero (Andalusia); Man of the Match: Granero, Benzema

==== Round of 16 ====
22 December 2010 First leg	Real Madrid	8–0	Levante	Madrid
22:00 CET (UTC+01:00)	Benzema 6', 32', 69', (yellow card) 56'; Özil 10'; Albiol (yellow card) 21'; Pepe (yellow card) 29'; Di María (yellow card) 31'; Granero (yellow card) 44'; Ronaldo 45', 72', 74'; León 89'	Report	Munúa (yellow card) 10'; Cerra (yellow card) 18'; Juanlu (yellow card) 53'; Robusté (yellow card) 56' del Horno (yellow card) 76'	Stadium: Estadio Santiago Bernabéu; Attendance: 44,000; Referee: Javier Turienzo Álvarez (Castile and León); Man of the Match: Benzema, Ronaldo

6 January 2011 Second leg	Levante	2–0 (2–8 agg.)	Real Madrid	Valencia
22:00 CET (UTC+01:00)	Xisco 62' (pen.), (yellow card) 65'; Lois (yellow card) 80'; Sergio 86'	Report	Benzema (yellow card) 26'; Gago (yellow card) 61'; Pepe (yellow card) 79'	Stadium: Estadi Ciutat de València; Attendance: 12,387; Referee: Javier Estrada Fernández (Catalonia)

==== Quarter-finals ====
13 January 2011 First leg	Real Madrid	3–1	Atlético Madrid	Madrid
22:00 CET (UTC+01:00)	Ramos 14'; Di María (yellow card) 27'; Ronaldo 61', (yellow card) 72'; Özil 90'	Report	Forlán 7'; Assunção (yellow card) 35'; Domínguez (yellow card) 85'	Stadium: Estadio Santiago Bernabéu; Attendance: 68,000; Referee: Antonio Mateu Lahoz (Valencian Community); Man of the Match: Ramos, Ronaldo

20 January 2011 Second leg	Atlético Madrid	0–1 (1–4 agg.)	Real Madrid	Madrid
22:00 CET (UTC+01:00)	Tiago (yellow card) 33'; Juanfran (yellow card) 72'; Costa (yellow card) 89'	Report	Arbeloa (yellow card) 21'; Ronaldo 23', (yellow card) 56'; Marcelo (yellow card) 45'; Ramos (yellow card) 74'; Gago (yellow card) 90'; Albiol (yellow card) 90+1'	Stadium: Estadio Vicente Calderón; Attendance: 46,580; Referee: Javier Turienzo Álvarez (Castile and León); Man of the Match: Ronaldo, Marcelo

==== Semi-finals ====
26 January 2011 First leg	Sevilla	0–1	Real Madrid	Seville
20:00 CET (UTC+01:00)	Luís Fabiano (yellow card) 20'; Zokora (yellow card) 46'; Alexis (yellow card) 48'; Navarro (yellow card) 83'	Report	L. Diarra (yellow card) 8'; Benzema 17'; Arbeloa (yellow card) 32'; Khedira (yellow card) 58'; Ronaldo (yellow card) 58'; Ramos (yellow card) 90'	Stadium: Estadio Ramón Sánchez Pizjuán; Attendance: 38,675; Referee: Alberto Undiano Mallenco (Navarre); Man of the Match: Benzema, Albiol

2 February 2011 Second leg	Real Madrid	2–0 (3–0 agg.)	Sevilla	Madrid
22:00 CET (UTC+01:00)	Alonso (yellow card) 64'; Özil 82'; Ramos (yellow card) 89'; Adebayor 90+4'	Report	Navarro (yellow card) 37'; Cáceres (yellow card) 41'; Zokora (yellow card) 49'; Sánchez (yellow card) 66' (yellow-red card) 85'	Stadium: Estadio Santiago Bernabéu; Attendance: 64,000; Referee: Fernando Teixeira Vitienes (Cantabria); Man of the Match: Özil

==== Final ====
20 April 2011 Final	Barcelona	0–1 (a.e.t.)	Real Madrid	Valencia
21:30 CEST (UTC+02:00)	Pedro (yellow card) 34'; Messi (yellow card) 64'; Adriano (yellow card) 118'	Report	Pepe (yellow card) 26'; Alonso (yellow card) 60'; Adebayor (yellow card) 74'; Di María (yellow card) 86' (yellow-red card) 118'; Ronaldo 103'	Stadium: Estadio Mestalla; Attendance: 55,000; Referee: Alberto Undiano Mallenco (Navarre); Man of the Match: Casillas, Ronaldo

Last updated: 20 April 2011
Source: Sorteo deciseisavos Copa del Rey

=== UEFA Champions League ===
==== Group stage ====
Pos	Team	Pld	W	D	L	GF	GA	GD	Pts	Qualification
1	(Spain) Real Madrid	6	5	1	0	15	2	+13	16	Advance to knockout phase
2	(Italy) Milan	6	2	2	2	7	7	0	8	Advance to knockout phase
3	(Netherlands) Ajax	6	2	1	3	6	10	−4	7	Transfer to Europa League
4	(France) Auxerre	6	1	0	5	3	12	−9	3	

Source: Soccerway

15 September 2010 1	Real Madrid (Spain)	2–0	(Netherlands) Ajax	Madrid, Spain
20:45 CEST (UTC+02:00)	Alonso (yellow card) 28'; Anita 31' (o.g.); Higuaín 73'	Report	De Zeeuw (yellow card) 73'	Stadium: Estadio Santiago Bernabéu; Attendance: 69,639; Referee: Damir Skomina (Slovenia); Man of the Match: Higuaín

28 September 2010 2	Auxerre (France)	0–1	(Spain) Real Madrid	Auxerre, France
20:45 CEST (UTC+02:00)	Jeleń (yellow card) 75'; Traoré (yellow card) 83'	Report	Ronaldo (yellow card) 39'; Ramos (yellow card) 60'; L. Diarra (yellow card) 67'; Di María 81'	Stadium: Stade de l'Abbé-Deschamps; Attendance: 19,525; Referee: Claus Bo Larsen (Denmark); Man of the Match: Alonso

19 October 2010 3	Real Madrid (Spain)	2–0	(Italy) Milan	Madrid, Spain
20:45 CEST (UTC+02:00)	Ronaldo 13'; Özil 14'; Di María (yellow card) 81'	Report	Bonera (yellow card) 73'; Boateng (yellow card) 76'; Antonini (yellow card) 80'	Stadium: Estadio Santiago Bernabéu; Attendance: 71,657; Referee: Pedro Proença (Portugal); Man of the Match: Ronaldo

3 November 2010 4	Milan (Italy)	2–2	(Spain) Real Madrid	Milan, Italy
20:45 CET (UTC+01:00)	Boateng (yellow card) 28'; Abate (yellow card) 56'; Ibrahimović (yellow card) 57'; Inzaghi 68', 78'; Gattuso (yellow card) 70'	Report	Higuaín 45'; Pepe (yellow card) 80'; Carvalho (yellow card) 90+1'; León 90+4'	Stadium: San Siro; Attendance: 76,357; Referee: Howard Webb (England); Man of the Match: Inzaghi

23 November 2010 5	Ajax (Netherlands)	0–4	(Spain) Real Madrid	Amsterdam, Netherlands
20:45 CET (UTC+01:00)	Enoh (yellow card) 35'; De Zeeuw (yellow card) 61'	Report	Ramos (yellow card) 33' (yellow-red card) 90+1'; Benzema 36'; Arbeloa 44'; Ronaldo (yellow card) 61', (goal) 69', 81' (pen.); Alonso (yellow card) 68' (yellow-red card) 87'; Albiol (yellow card) 84'	Stadium: Amsterdam Arena; Attendance: 48,491; Referee: Craig Thomson (Scotland); Man of the Match: Ronaldo
Note: José Mourinho was suspended for one match after UEFA found him guilty of instructing Alonso and Ramos to deliberately receive strategic second yellow cards.

8 December 2010 6	Real Madrid (Spain)	4–0	(France) Auxerre	Madrid, Spain
20:45 CET (UTC+01:00)	Benzema 12', 72', 88'; Albiol (yellow card) 26'; M. Diarra (yellow card) 40'; Ronaldo 49'	Report	Mignot (yellow card) 34'	Stadium: Estadio Santiago Bernabéu; Attendance: 54,917; Referee: Serge Gumienny (Belgium); Man of the Match: Benzema

==== Knockout phase ====
===== Round of 16 =====
22 February 2011 First leg	Lyon (France)	1–1	(Spain) Real Madrid	Lyon, France
20:45 CET (UTC+01:00)	Bastos (yellow card) 48'; Cris (yellow card) 63'; Pied (yellow card) 70'; Gomis 83'	Report	Ramos (yellow card) 10'; Di María (yellow card) 45'; Benzema 65'; Casillas (yellow card) 90+1'	Stadium: Stade de Gerland; Attendance: 40,299; Referee: Wolfgang Stark (Germany); Man of the Match: Benzema

16 March 2011 Second leg	Real Madrid (Spain)	3–0 (4–1 agg.)	(France) Lyon	Madrid, Spain
20:45 CET (UTC+01:00)	Pepe (yellow card) 9'; Carvalho (yellow card) 30'; Marcelo 37'; Benzema 66'; Di María 76'	Report	Gourcuff (yellow card) 38'; Cissokho (yellow card) 54'	Stadium: Estadio Santiago Bernabéu; Attendance: 70,034; Referee: Damir Skomina (Slovenia); Man of the Match: Marcelo

===== Quarter-finals =====
5 April 2011 First leg	Real Madrid (Spain)	4–0	(England) Tottenham Hotspur	Madrid, Spain
20:45 CEST (UTC+02:00)	Adebayor 4', 57', (yellow card) 12'; Pepe (yellow card) 36'; Di María 72'; Ronaldo 87'	Report	Crouch (yellow card) 8' (yellow-red card) 15'; Van der Vaart (yellow card) 19'; Defoe (yellow card) 74'	Stadium: Estadio Santiago Bernabéu; Attendance: 71,657; Referee: Felix Brych (Germany); Man of the Match: Adebayor

13 April 2011 Second leg	Tottenham Hotspur (England)	0–1 (0–5 agg.)	(Spain) Real Madrid	London, England
20:45 CEST (UTC+02:00)		Report	Carvalho (yellow card) 39'; Ronaldo 50'; Granero (yellow card) 79'	Stadium: White Hart Lane; Attendance: 34,311; Referee: Nicola Rizzoli (Italy); Man of the Match: Alonso

===== Semi-finals =====
27 April 2011 First leg	Real Madrid (Spain)	0–2	(Spain) Barcelona	Madrid, Spain
20:45 CEST (UTC+02:00)	Arbeloa (yellow card) 40'; Ramos (yellow card) 53'; Pepe (red card) 61'; Adebayor (yellow card) 83'	Report	Alves (yellow card) 44'; Pinto (red card) 45+2'; Mascherano (yellow card) 57'; Messi 76', 87'	Stadium: Estadio Santiago Bernabéu; Attendance: 71,567; Referee: Wolfgang Stark (Germany); Man of the Match: Messi
Note: Unused substitute José Manuel Pinto was sent off (red card) for altercations with the rival bench. Real Madrid manager José Mourinho was ejected in the 61st minute for protesting Pepe's red card.

3 May 2011 Second leg	Barcelona (Spain)	1–1 (3–1 agg.)	(Spain) Real Madrid	Barcelona, Spain
20:45 CEST (UTC+02:00)	Pedro 54', (yellow card) 82'	Report	Carvalho (yellow card) 13'; L. Diarra (yellow card) 58'; Marcelo 64', (yellow card) 75'; Alonso (yellow card) 69'; Adebayor (yellow card) 85'	Stadium: Camp Nou; Attendance: 95,701; Referee: Frank De Bleeckere (Belgium); Man of the Match: Messi
Note: Real Madrid manager José Mourinho was banned from this match following his ejection in the first leg.

Last updated: 3 May 2011
Source: realmadrid.com, Draws, Matches

== Statistics ==
=== Players statistics ===
No.	Pos	Nat	Player	Total		La Liga		Champions League		Copa del Rey	
No.	Pos	Nat	Player	Apps	Goals	Apps	Goals	Apps	Goals	Apps	Goals
1	GK	(Spain) ESP	Iker Casillas	54	-40	35	-32	11	-6	8	-2
4	DF	(Spain) ESP	Sergio Ramos	46	4	30+1	3	8	0	7	1
2	DF	(Portugal) POR	Ricardo Carvalho	48	3	31+2	3	9	0	6	0
3	DF	(Portugal) POR	Pepe	38	1	25+1	1	8	0	3+1	0
12	DF	(Brazil) BRA	Marcelo	50	5	31+1	3	12	2	5+1	0
14	DM	(Spain) ESP	Xabi Alonso	52	1	29+5	0	11	0	6+1	1
24	DM	(Germany) GER	Sami Khedira	40	0	20+5	0	8	0	6+1	0
22	MF	(Argentina) ARG	Ángel Di María	53	9	29+6	6	8+2	3	8	0
23	AM	(Germany) GER	Mesut Özil	53	10	30+6	6	9+2	1	5+1	3
7	MF	(Portugal) POR	Cristiano Ronaldo	54	53	32+2	40	12	6	7+1	7
9	FW	(France) FRA	Karim Benzema	48	26	20+13	15	4+4	6	7	5
13	GK	(Spain) ESP	Antonio Adán	5	-2	2+1	0	0+1	0	1	-2
17	DF	(Spain) ESP	Álvaro Arbeloa	43	1	20+6	0	9	1	8	0
10	DM	(France) FRA	Lassana Diarra	39	0	19+7	0	5+5	0	2+1	0
20	FW	(Argentina) ARG	Gonzalo Higuaín	25	13	16+1	10	5+1	2	1+1	1
18	DF	(Spain) ESP	Raúl Albiol	32	0	13+7	0	5+1	0	6	0
8	AM	(Brazil) BRA	Kaká	20	10	11+3	7	1+2	3	0+3	0
11	DM	(Spain) ESP	Esteban Granero	32	2	8+11	1	1+3	0	4+5	1
6	FW	(Togo) TOG	Emmanuel Adebayor	22	8	6+8	5	3+3	2	0+2	1
19	DF	(Argentina) ARG	Ezequiel Garay	8	0	4+1	0	0+1	0	1+1	0
16	AM	(Spain) ESP	Sergio Canales	15	0	3+7	0	0+2	0	3	0
35	DF	(Spain) ESP	Nacho	2	0	2	0				
5	DM	(Argentina) ARG	Fernando Gago	7	0	1+3	0	0	0	1+2	0
25	GK	(Poland) POL	Jerzy Dudek	2	-1	1	-1	1	0		
27	DF	(Spain) ESP	Juanfran	2	0	1	0	0	0	0+1	0
15	DF	(Spain) ESP	David Mateos	2	0	1	0	0+1	0		
21	MF	(Spain) ESP	Pedro León	14	2	0+6	0	2+2	1	3+1	1
6	DM	(Mali) MLI	Mahamadou Diarra	8	0	0+3	0	1+1	0	2+1	0
29	FW	(Spain) ESP	Álvaro Morata	2	0	0+1	0	0	0	0+1	0
26	MF	(Spain) ESP	Juan Carlos	1	0	0+1	0				
28	GK	(Spain) ESP	Jesús	1	0	0+1	-0				
30	DM	(Spain) ESP	Álex	1	0	0+1	0				
39	FW	(Spain) ESP	Joselu	1	1	0+1	1				
40	GK	(Spain) ESP	Tomás Mejías	1	0	0+1	0				
33	MF	(Spain) ESP	Pablo Sarabia	1	0	0	0	0+1	0		

- Source: https://www.bdfutbol.com/en/t/t2010-112.html

=== Minutes played ===
				Total				La Liga		UEFA Champions League		Copa del Rey		
N	Pos.	Name	Nat.	GS	App	Gls	Min	App	Gls	App	Gls	App	Gls	Notes
1	GK	Iker Casillas	(Spain)	54	54		5029	35		11		8		
4	RB	Sergio Ramos	(Spain)	45	46	4	4242	31	3	8		7	1	
3	CB	Pepe	(Portugal)	36	38	1	3387	26	1	8		4		
2	CB	Ricardo Carvalho	(Portugal)	46	48	3	4295	33	3	9		6		
12	LB	Marcelo	(Brazil)	47	50	5	4436	32	3	12	2	6		
24	DM	Sami Khedira	(Germany)	34	40		3228	25		8		7		
14	CM	Xabi Alonso	(Spain)	46	52	1	4438	34		11		7	1	
22	RW	Ángel Di María	(Argentina)	42	53	9	3700	35	6	10	3	8		
23	AM	Mesut Özil	(Germany)	45	53	10	3975	36	6	11	1	6	3	
7	LW	Cristiano Ronaldo	(Portugal)	51	54	53	4829	34	40	12	6	8	7	
9	ST	Karim Benzema	(France)	31	48	26	2880	33	15	8	6	7	5	
13	GK	Antonio Adán	(Spain)	3	5		411	3		1		1		
17	RB	Álvaro Arbeloa	(Spain)	37	43	1	3564	26		9	1	8		
10	DM	Lassana Diarra	(France)	26	39		2488	26		10		3		
18	CB	Raúl Albiol	(Spain)	24	32		2241	20		6		6		
20	ST	Gonzalo Higuaín	(Argentina)	22	25	13	1850	17	10	6	2	2	1	
11	CM	Esteban Granero	(Spain)	13	32	2	1359	19	1	4		9	1	
6	FW	Emmanuel Adebayor	(Togo)	9	22	8	1180	14	5	6	2	2	1	On Loan in Winter TW
8	AM	Kaká	(Brazil)	12	20	7	1043	14	7	3		3		
21	RW	Pedro León	(Spain)	5	14	2	619	6		4	1	4	1	
16	AM	Sergio Canales	(Spain)	6	15		554	10		2		3		
19	CB	Ezequiel Garay	(Argentina)	5	8		468	5		1		2		
5	CM	Fernando Gago	(Argentina)	2	7		210	4				3		
25	GK	Jerzy Dudek	(Poland)	2	2		127	1		1				
35	LB	Nacho	(Spain)	2	2		148	2						
27	RB	Juanfran	(Spain)		1		22					1		
33	LW	Pablo Sarabia	(Spain)		1		20			1				
29	ST	Álvaro Morata	(Spain)		2		17	1				1		
26	LW	Juan Carlos	(Spain)		1		12	1						
28	GK	Jesús	(Spain)		1		12	1						
40	GK	Tomás Mejías	(Spain)		1		9	1						
39	ST	Joselu	(Spain)		1	1	5	1	1					
15	CB	David Mateos	(Spain)	1	2		83			1		1		Out in Winter TW
30	CM	Álex	(Spain)		1		3	1						
6	DM	Mahamadou Diarra	(Mali)	3	8		336	3		2		3		Out in Winter TW

Last updated: 23 May 2011
Source: Match reports in competitive matches, realmadrid.com, LFP.com, soccernet.espn, sportec.es
Ordered by start team, game starts and position on pitch (from back right to front left)
0 shown as blank

=== Goals ===
R	Player	Position	League	Champions League	Copa del Rey	Total
1	(Portugal) Cristiano Ronaldo	LW	40	6	7	53
2	(France) Karim Benzema	ST	15	6	5	26
3	(Argentina) Gonzalo Higuaín	ST	10	2	1	13
4	(Germany) Mesut Özil	AM	6	1	3	10
5	(Argentina) Ángel Di María	RW	6	3	0	9
6	(Togo) Emmanuel Adebayor	ST	5	2	1	8
7	(Brazil) Kaká	AM	7	0	0	7
8	(Brazil) Marcelo	LB	3	2	0	5
9	(Spain) Sergio Ramos	RB	3	0	1	4
10	(Portugal) Ricardo Carvalho	CB	3	0	0	3
11	(Spain) Esteban Granero	CM	1	0	1	2
11	(Spain) Pedro León	RW	0	1	1	2
13	(Portugal) Pepe	CB	1	0	0	1
13	(Spain) Joselu	ST	1	0	0	1
13	(Spain) Álvaro Arbeloa	RB	0	1	0	1
13	(Spain) Xabi Alonso	CM	0	0	1	1

Last updated: 21 May 2011
Source: Match reports in Competitive matches

=== Disciplinary record ===
N	Pos.	Nat.	Name	Yellow card	Second yellow card	Red card	Notes
4	RB	(Spain)	Sergio Ramos	17	1	1	
3	CB	(Portugal)	Pepe	10	1	1	
18	CB	(Spain)	Raúl Albiol	7		1	
1	GK	(Spain)	Iker Casillas	4		1	
2	CB	(Portugal)	Ricardo Carvalho	13	2		
17	RB	(Spain)	Álvaro Arbeloa	8	2		
14	CM	(Spain)	Xabi Alonso	17	1		
22	RW	(Argentina)	Ángel Di María	10	1		
10	DM	(France)	Lassana Diarra	14			
12	LB	(Brazil)	Marcelo	9			
24	DM	(Germany)	Sami Khedira	8			
11	CM	(Spain)	Esteban Granero	8			
7	LW	(Portugal)	Cristiano Ronaldo	7			
16	AM	(Spain)	Sergio Canales	4			
6	ST	(Togo)	Emmanuel Adebayor	4			
6	DM	(Mali)	Mahamadou Diarra	3			
9	ST	(France)	Karim Benzema	3			
23	AM	(Germany)	Mesut Özil	2			
5	DM	(Argentina)	Fernando Gago	2			
20	ST	(Argentina)	Gonzalo Higuaín	1			
21	RW	(Spain)	Pedro León	1			

Last updated: 21 May 2011
Source: Competitive matches and LFP.com, sportec.es
Only competitive matches
(yellow card) = Number of bookings; (second yellow card) = Number of sending offs after a second yellow card; (red card) = Number of sending offs by a direct red card..

=== Start formations ===
Qnt	Formation	Match(es)
44	4–2–3–1	2–6, 8, 10–15, 17–20, 23–32, 34–44, 47, 49, 54–58
10	4–3–3	1, 7, 21–22, 45–46, 48, 50–51, 53
3	4–4–2	9, 52, 59
1	4–2–2–2	16
1	4–3–1–2	33

Last updated: 21 May 2011
Source: Match reports in Competitive matches
Only competitive matches.

=== Overall ===
	Total	Home	Away	Neutral
Games played	59	29	29	1
Games won	44	25	18	1
Games drawn	9	1	8	0
Games lost	6	3	3	0
Biggest win	8–0 vs Levante	8–0 vs Levante	4–0 vs Ajax; 6–2 vs Sevilla	1–0 vs Barcelona
Biggest loss	0–5 vs Barcelona	0–2 vs Barcelona	0–5 vs Barcelona	
Biggest win (League)	7–0 vs Málaga; 8–1 vs Almería	7–0 vs Málaga; 8–1 vs Almería	6–2 vs Sevilla	
Biggest win (Cup)	8–0 vs Levante	8–0 vs Levante	1–0 vs Atlético Madrid; 1–0 vs Sevilla	1–0 vs Barcelona
Biggest win (Europe)	4–0 vs Ajax; 4–0 vs Auxerre; 4–0 vs Tottenham Hotspur	4–0 vs Auxerre; 4–0 vs Tottenham Hotspur	4–0 vs Ajax	
Biggest loss (League)	0–5 vs Barcelona	0–1 vs Sporting Gijón; 2–3 vs Real Zaragoza	0–5 vs Barcelona	
Biggest loss (Cup)	0–2 vs Levante		0–2 vs Levante	
Biggest loss (Europe)	0–2 vs Barcelona	0–2 vs Barcelona		
Clean sheets	30	17	12	1
Goals scored	148	94	53	1
Goals conceded	43	16	27	0
Goal difference	+105	+78	+26	+1
Average GF per game	2.51	3.24	1.83	1
Average GA per game	0.73	0.55	0.93	0
Yellow cards	152	65	84	3
Red cards	12	6	5	1
Most appearances	(Spain) Iker Casillas (54)	–		
Most minutes played	(Spain) Iker Casillas (5029)	–		
Top scorer	(Portugal) Cristiano Ronaldo (53)	–		
Top assistor	(Germany) Mesut Özil (25)	–		
Points	138/174 (79.31%)	73/84 (86.9%)	62/87 (71.26%)	3/3 (100%)
Winning rate	74.58%	86.21%	62.07%	100%

Last updated: 21 May 2011
Source: Competitive matches

== See also ==
- 2010–11 La Liga
- 2010–11 Copa del Rey
- 2010–11 UEFA Champions League
