= Jon González =

Spanish footballer and coach

Personal information
- Full name: Jon Aingeru González Díez
- Date of birth: 31 December 1973 (age 52)
- Place of birth: Sestao, Spain
- Position: Forward

Youth career
- Athletic Bilbao

Senior career*
| Years | Team | Apps | (Gls) |
| 1992–1993 | Sestao | 1 | (0) |
| 1993–1994 | Osasuna B | 14 | (1) |
| 1994–1996 | Durango | | |
| 1996–1997 | Zalla | 9 | (0) |
- San Pedro
| Total | | 51 | (7) |

Managerial career
- San Vicente (youth)
- Santutxu (youth)
- Peña Athletic Santurtzi
- Sporting Lutxana
- Indautxu
- 2011–2015: Retuerto
- 2015–2016: Sestao (assistant)
- 2016: Sestao
- * Club domestic league appearances and goals

Jon Aingeru González Díez (born 31 December 1973) is a Spanish retired footballer who played as a forward, and a current coach.

== Playing career ==
Born in Sestao, Basque Country, González was known as Peli during his playing days. An Athletic Bilbao youth graduate, he moved to Segunda División side Sestao Sport Club in 1972, and made his maiden appearance in the category on 12 June 1973 by coming on as a late substitute in a 1–2 home loss against Mérida UD.

Subsequently, until his retirement, he always competed in the lower leagues, representing CA Osasuna B, SCD Durango, Zalla UC and SD San Pedro. His best personal input consisted of six goals and 27 appearances during the 1995–96 campaign.

== Managerial career ==
After starting his career with the youth sides of Union Sport San Vicente and Santutxu FC, González coached Peña Athletic de Santurtzi CF, Sporting Club de Lutxana, SD Indautxu and SD Retuerto Sport, achieving promotion to Tercera División with the latter in 2013.

On 13 November 2015 González joined Sestao River Club as Txus Pinedo's assistant. The following 24 May, he renewed his contract and subsequently became the club's first team manager.
