= Joseba del Olmo =

Spanish footballer

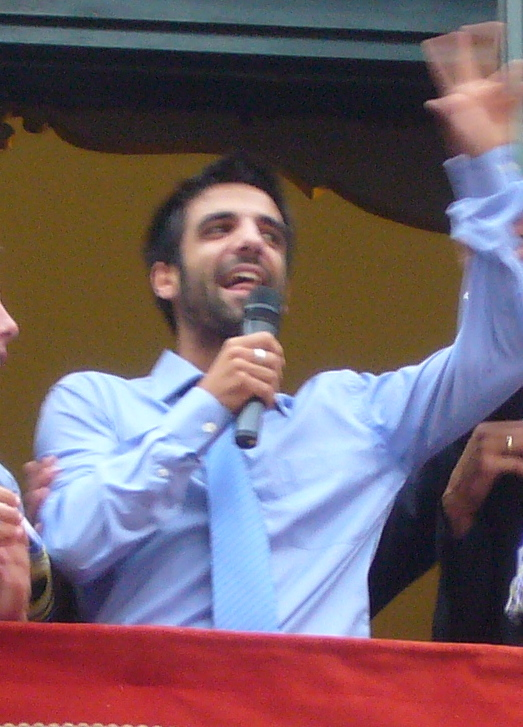
- Del Olmo celebrating Hércules' promotion, 2010

Personal information
- Full name: Joseba del Olmo García
- Date of birth: 20 June 1981 (age 45)
- Place of birth: Barakaldo, Spain
- Height: 1.72 m (5 ft 8 in)
- Position: Winger

Youth career
- 1993–1999: Sporting Lutxana

Senior career*
| Years | Team | Apps | (Gls) |
| 1999–2000 | Sporting Lutxana | | |
| 2000–2002 | Arenas Getxo | 74 | (13) |
| 2002–2004 | Lemona | 70 | (14) |
| 2004–2006 | Barakaldo | 61 | (8) |
| 2006–2007 | Sestao | 36 | (9) |
| 2007–2008 | Eibar | 36 | (5) |
| 2008–2009 | Athletic Bilbao | 10 | (1) |
| 2009–2011 | Hércules | 20 | (0) |
| 2010–2011 | → Ponferradina (loan) | 35 | (1) |
| 2012–2013 | Eibar | 22 | (3) |
| 2013–2014 | Laudio | 23 | (3) |
| 2014–2015 | Lagun Onak | 29 | (2) |
- * Club domestic league appearances and goals as of 18 October 2015

Joseba del Olmo García (born 20 June 1981) is a Spanish former professional footballer who played as a left winger.

== Club career ==
Del Olmo was born in Barakaldo, Biscay. From 1999 to 2004 he played in the Basque lower leagues (Tercera División or lower), subsequently representing Barakaldo CF and Sestao River Club in Segunda División B.

In 2007–08, del Olmo played in the Segunda División for the first time in his career, with SD Eibar. At the end of the season, regional neighbours Athletic Bilbao paid the €300,000 buyout clause in his contract and, on 13 June 2008, he signed a one-year deal which included automatic renewal for another year if he appeared in a minimum of 22 official games as well as a buyout clause of €20 million; he was officially presented four days later.

After an unspectacular campaign which included a spell out with a fractured ulna and did not feature enough appearances to trigger the contract extension del Olmo was released by Athletic and returned to the second level, agreeing to a two-year deal with Hércules CF. Although he rarely started and did not find the net throughout the 2009–10 season, he did appear in 20 matches as the Alicante side returned to the top flight after 13 years. However, he did not get another opportunity to play at that level, instead being loaned to SD Ponferradina who suffered relegation at the end of the 2010–11 Segunda División campaign (Hércules also went straight back down).

He later had another spell at Eibar, helping them to gain promotion from the third tier in 2012–13, albeit he only started two of the 11 fixtures in which he appeared, and the following year stayed down at the same level with CD Laudio but was unable to prevent the Álava minnows' relegation. He spent a final season back in the Tercera División at CD Lagun Onak.
