= Jon Ander López =

Spanish footballer

Personal information
- Full name: Jon Ander López Maquiera
- Date of birth: 6 September 1976
- Place of birth: Barakaldo, Spain
- Date of death: 6 January 2013 (aged 36)
- Place of death: Sestao, Spain
- Height: 1.88 m (6 ft 2 in)
- Position: Goalkeeper

Senior career*
Years	Team	Apps	(Gls)
1995–1996	Racing Santander B		
1996–1997	Basconia		
1997–1998	Barakaldo	36	(0)
1998–2000	Eibar	48	(0)
2000–2004	Valladolid	0	(0)
2001–2002	→ Levante (loan)	10	(0)
2004–2005	Salamanca	13	(0)
2005	Jaén	0	(0)
2006	Écija	17	(0)
2006–2007	Lucena		
2010–2011	Sporting Lutxana		
- * Club domestic league appearances and goals

Jon Ander López Maquiera (6 September 1976 – 6 January 2013), known as Jon Ander in his playing days, was a Spanish footballer who played as a goalkeeper.

== Club career ==
Born in Barakaldo, Basque Country, Jon Ander played his first seasons as a senior with modest clubs in his native region. In summer 1998 he joined SD Eibar, going on to play two Segunda División seasons with the team.

Jon Ander was part of Real Valladolid's roster in several La Liga campaigns, but never appeared in the competition during his spell, also being loaned to Levante UD in the second level. Released by the former in June 2004, he played one season with UD Salamanca in division two, then saw out his remaining career in the lower leagues.

Late into the season where Lucena CF would eventually achieve promotion to Segunda División B for the first time ever, López retired from football at the age of only 30, immediately becoming the Andalusian club's president. On 6 January 2013, four years after leaving his post, the 36-year-old died suddenly from a heart attack while in Sestao.
