= David Cerrajería =

Spanish footballer

Cerra
Personal information
- Full name: David Cerrajería Rubio
- Date of birth: 4 June 1983 (age 43)
- Place of birth: Valencia, Spain
- Height: 1.77 m (5 ft 10 in)
- Position: Full back

Senior career*
Years	Team	Apps	(Gls)
2002–2005	Alicante	26	(0)
2005–2007	Valencia B	57	(0)
2006–2008	Valencia	5	(0)
2007–2008	→ Poli Ejido (loan)	24	(0)
2008–2011	Levante	55	(0)
2011–2013	Córdoba	15	(0)
2013–2014	Platanias	9	(0)
2016	Ceahlăul	8	(0)
Total		199	(0)
- * Club domestic league appearances and goals

David Cerrajería Rubio (born 4 June 1983), commonly known as Cerra, is a Spanish former footballer who played as a defender (either right or left back).

== Football career ==
After three seasons with lowly Alicante CF in Segunda División B, Valencia-born Cerra signed for Valencia CF. Although already 22, he would spend the next two years registered with its B-team, playing his first season in Tercera División, with promotion.

As a versatile defensive unit capable of playing as a right or left back, Cerra found action on either side of the pitch in five La Liga matches, his debut coming on 5 November 2006 in a 1–1 away draw against RCD Espanyol. This was due to a storm of injuries that hit the back-four sector hard in the campaign (Emiliano Moretti and Asier del Horno the more serious ones).

Cerra was loaned to Segunda División's Polideportivo Ejido for 2007–08 and, after the Andalusia team's relegation, left Valencia for another club in the community, Levante UD. He appeared in 15 games in his second year – 11 starts – helping to a return to the top flight after two years.
