= SD Retuerto Sport =

Spanish football club

Retuerto Sport
- Full name: Sociedad Deportiva Retuerto Sport
- Founded: 1923
- Ground: Ibarreta, Barakaldo, Basque Country, Spain
- Capacity: 822
- Chairman: (Spain) Ángel María Pascual
- Manager: (Spain) Jon González
- League: Primera División – Group 1
- 2024–25: Primera División – Group 1, 3rd of 18
Home colours	Away colours

Sociedad Deportiva Retuerto Sport is a football team based in Barakaldo in the autonomous community of Basque Country. Founded in 1923, the team plays in Primera División – Group 1. The club's home ground is Ibarreta, which has a capacity of 822 spectators.

== Season to season ==
Season	Tier	Division	Place	Copa del Rey
1928–29	7	3ª Reg. P.	(R)	
1929–1961	DNP			
1961–62	5	2ª Reg.	9th	
1962–63	5	2ª Reg.	6th	
1963–64	5	2ª Reg.	13th	
1964–65	5	2ª Reg.	14th	
1965–1972	DNP			
1972–73	6	2ª Reg.	8th	
1973–74	6	2ª Reg.	11th	
1974–75	6	2ª Reg.	3rd	
1975–76	6	2ª Reg.	4th	
1976–77	6	2ª Reg.	2nd	
1977–78	6	1ª Reg.	7th	
1978–79	6	1ª Reg.	16th	
1979–80	6	1ª Reg.	3rd	
1980–81	5	Reg. Pref.	11th	
1981–82	5	Reg. Pref.	20th	
1982–83	6	1ª Reg.	2nd	
1983–84	5	Reg. Pref.	15th	
1984–85	5	Reg. Pref.	20th	

Season	Tier	Division	Place	Copa del Rey
1985–86	6	1ª Reg.	4th	
1986–87	6	1ª Reg.	4th	
1987–88	6	1ª Reg.	3rd	
1988–89	6	1ª Reg.	3rd	
1989–90	6	1ª Reg.	1st	
1990–91	5	Terr. Pref.	13th	
1991–92	5	Terr. Pref.	11th	
1992–93	5	Terr. Pref.	14th	
1993–94	5	Terr. Pref.	14th	
1994–95	5	Terr. Pref.	16th	
1995–96	6	1ª Terr.	1st	
1996–97	5	Terr. Pref.	17th	
1997–98	6	1ª Terr.	1st	
1998–99	5	Terr. Pref.	13th	
1999–2000	5	Terr. Pref.	12th	
2000–01	5	Terr. Pref.	14th	
2001–02	5	Terr. Pref.	7th	
2002–03	5	Div. Hon.	17th	
2003–04	6	Pref.	4th	
2004–05	6	Pref.	1st	

Season	Tier	Division	Place	Copa del Rey
2005–06	5	Div. Hon.	8th	
2006–07	5	Div. Hon.	9th	
2007–08	5	Div. Hon.	4th	
2008–09	5	Div. Hon.	1st	
2009–10	4	3ª	19th	
2010–11	5	Div. Hon.	16th	
2011–12	6	Pref.	3rd	
2012–13	5	Div. Hon.	2nd	
2013–14	4	3ª	20th	
2014–15	5	Div. Hon.	4th	
2015–16	5	Div. Hon.	12th	
2016–17	5	Div. Hon.	11th	
2017–18	5	Div. Hon.	16th	
2018–19	6	Pref.	11th	
2019–20	6	Pref.	11th	
2020–21	DNP			
2021–22	7	Pref.	16th	
2022–23	8	1ª Div.	2nd	
2023–24	8	1ª Div.	8th	
2024–25	8	1ª Div.	3rd	

Season	Tier	Division	Place	Copa del Rey
2025–26	8	1ª Div.		

- 2 seasons in Tercera División
