= Juan Elía =

Spanish footballer

Personal information
- Full name: Juan Elía Vallejo
- Date of birth: 24 January 1979 (age 47)
- Place of birth: Pamplona, Spain
- Height: 1.88 m (6 ft 2 in)
- Position: Goalkeeper

Youth career
- 1993–1997: Osasuna

Senior career*
Years	Team	Apps	(Gls)
1997–2002	Osasuna B	109	(0)
2002–2008	Osasuna	40	(0)
2002–2003	→ Ourense (loan)	36	(0)
2008–2010	Murcia	61	(0)
Total		246	(0)

International career
1997	Spain U17	4	(0)
1996–1998	Spain U18	10	(0)
1998	Spain U20	2	(0)
2004–2005	Navarre	2	(0)
- * Club domestic league appearances and goals

Juan Elía Vallejo (born 24 January 1979) is a Spanish former professional footballer who played as a goalkeeper.

== Club career ==
Born in Pamplona, Navarre, Elía spent the bulk of his professional career with his hometown side CA Osasuna, save for a loan at modest CD Ourense. In the 2004–05 campaign he played a personal-best in La Liga 22 games, but served mostly as a backup during his spell with his main club, 15 years including his formative ones; he was also in goal in the 2005 Copa del Rey final, lost 2–1 against Real Betis at the Vicente Calderón Stadium.

In August 2008, Elía joined Real Murcia CF, recently relegated to the Segunda División. He was first choice in his debut season but the team only finished in mid-table, being relegated in the following with him appearing in 24 matches.

Elía announced his retirement in September 2010 at the age of 31, due to persistent back problems. Subsequently, he took up golf.

== International career ==
Elía represented Navarre in two matches.
