= Ricardo Sanzol =

Spanish footballer

Personal information
- Full name: Ricardo Sanzol Goñi
- Date of birth: 8 April 1976 (age 50)
- Place of birth: Pamplona, Spain
- Height: 1.82 m (6 ft 0 in)
- Position: Goalkeeper

Youth career
- San Juan
- Osasuna

Senior career*
Years	Team	Apps	(Gls)
1995–1998	Osasuna B	44	(0)
1997–2005	Osasuna	122	(0)
2005–2007	Albacete	27	(0)
2008	Hércules	2	(0)
Total		195	(0)

International career
2002–2004	Basque Country	2	(0)
2003	Navarre	1	(0)
- * Club domestic league appearances and goals

Ricardo Sanzol Goñi (born 8 April 1976 in Pamplona, Navarre) is a Spanish former footballer who played as a goalkeeper.

== Career statistics ==
=== Club ===
Appearances and goals by club, season and competition
Club	Season	League			National cup		Other		Total	
Club	Season	Division	Apps	Goals	Apps	Goals	Apps	Goals	Apps	Goals
Osasuna B	1995–96	Segunda División B	20	0	—		—		20	0
Osasuna B	1996–97	Segunda División B	20	0	—		—		20	0
Osasuna B	1997–98	Segunda División B	3	0	—		1	0	4	0
Osasuna B	Total		43	0	—		1	0	44	0
Osasuna	1996–97	Segunda División	2	0	0	0	—		2	0
Osasuna	1997–98	Segunda División	2	0	1	0	—		3	0
Osasuna	1998–99	Segunda División	2	0	4	0	—		6	0
Osasuna	1999–2000	Segunda División	24	0	8	0	—		32	0
Osasuna	2000–01	La Liga	6	0	1	0	—		7	0
Osasuna	2001–02	La Liga	2	0	2	0	—		4	0
Osasuna	2002–03	La Liga	34	0	1	0	—		35	0
Osasuna	2003–04	La Liga	34	0	0	0	—		34	0
Osasuna	2004–05	La Liga	16	0	4	0	—		20	0
Osasuna	Total		122	0	21	0	—		143	0
Albacete	2005–06	Segunda División	19	0	1	0	—		20	0
Albacete	2006–07	Segunda División	8	0	1	0	—		9	0
Albacete	Total		27	0	2	0	—		29	0
Hércules	2007–08	Segunda División	2	0	0	0	—		2	0
Career total			194	0	23	0	1	0	218	0
