= Navarre Football Federation =

- Abbreviation: FNF
- Formation: 1928
- Purpose: Football Association
- Headquarters: Pamplona
- Location: Navarre, Spain
- President: Rafael del Amo Arizu
- Website: www.futnavarra.es

The Navarre Football Federation (Spanish: Federación Navarra de Fútbol, FNF; Basque: Nafarroako Futbol Federazioa, NFF) is the football association responsible for all competitions of any form of football developed in Navarre. It is integrated into the Royal Spanish Football Federation and its headquarters are located in Pamplona.

== Competitions ==
- Men's
  - Tercera Federación (Group 15)
  - Primera Autonómica (1 group)
  - Regional Preferente (2 groups)
  - Primera Regional (4 groups)
- Youth
  - Liga Nacional Juvenil Group XVI
  - Divisiones Regionales
- Women's
  - Divisiones Regionales

== See also ==
- Navarre autonomous football team
- List of Spanish regional football federations
