= Ignacio Benítez =

Spanish footballer

Personal information
- Full name: José Ignacio Benítez Castañeda
- Date of birth: 9 February 1979 (age 47)
- Place of birth: Huelva, Spain
- Height: 1.73 m (5 ft 8 in)
- Position: Winger

Youth career
- Recreativo

Senior career*
| Years | Team | Apps | (Gls) |
| 1998–2000 | Recreativo B | | |
| 2000–2006 | Recreativo | 158 | (12) |
| 2006–2008 | Hércules | 6 | (2) |
| 2006–2007 | → Rayo Vallecano (loan) | 16 | (2) |
| 2008 | Cartagena | 13 | (1) |
| 2008–2009 | Ayamonte | 35 | (6) |
| Total | | 228 | (23) |
- * Club domestic league appearances and goals

José Ignacio Benítez Castañeda (born 9 February 1979) is a Spanish retired footballer who played as a left winger.

== Football career ==
Born in Huelva, Andalusia, Benítez graduated from Recreativo de Huelva's youth setup. After two years with the reserves, he was promoted to the first team in Segunda División by manager Lucas Alcaraz, and subsequently renewed his contract despite suffering an injury in the pre-season.

On 3 September 2000, Benítez played his first match as a professional, starting in a 0–0 home draw against CD Badajoz. He scored his first goal on the 17th, netting in the 1–0 success over Córdoba CF also at the Estadio Colombino.

Benítez was an ever-present figure in the 2001–02 season, as his team returned to La Liga after a 23-year absence. He made his debut in the competition on 1 September 2002, playing the full 90 minutes in a 2–3 home loss to Málaga CF.

Benítez subsequently lost his space in Recre's starting XI, mainly due to injuries. On 13 July 2006, he signed with Hércules CF also in the second level, but after appearing rarely he was loaned to Segunda División B club Rayo Vallecano on 31 January 2007.

On 23 January 2008, Benítez moved to FC Cartagena from the third tier. On 2 September of that year, he joined Tercera División side Ayamonte CF, retiring with the latter at the end of the campaign.
