= Union Sport San Vicente =

Spanish football club

US San Vicente
- Full name: Union Sport San Vicente
- Founded: 1923
- Ground: Ciudad Deportiva San Vicente, Barakaldo, Basque Country, Spain
- Capacity: 1,200
- Chairman: (Spain) Luis Miguel Ogando
- Manager: (Spain) Pablo Rodríguez
- League: Primera División – Group 1
- 2024–25: Primera División – Group 1, 6th of 18
Home colours	Away colours

Union Sport San Vicente is a football team based in Barakaldo in the autonomous community of Basque Country. Founded in 1923, the team plays in Primera División – Group 1, holding home games at Ciudad Deportiva San Vicente, with a 1,200-seat capacity.

== Season to season ==
Season	Tier	Division	Place	Copa del Rey
1928–29	6	2ª Reg.	1st	
1929–30	6	2ª Reg.	1st	
1930–31	6	2ª Reg.	7th	
1931–32	6	2ª Reg.	4th	
1932–33	6	2ª Reg.	1st	
1933–34	6	2ª Reg.	1st	
1934–35	4	1ª Reg.	4th	
1935–36	4	1ª Reg.	10th	
1939–40	5	1ª Reg. B	5th	
1940–41	5	1ª Reg. B	5th	
1941–42	3	1ª Reg. A	9th	
1941–1946	DNP			
1946–47	5	2ª Reg.	6th	
1947–48	5	2ª Reg.	2nd	
1948–49	5	2ª Reg.	1st	
1949–50	5	2ª Reg.	3rd	
1950–51	5	2ª Reg.	5th	
1951–52	5	2ª Reg.	2nd	
1952–53	4	1ª Reg.	11th	
1953–54	5	2ª Reg.	8th	

Season	Tier	Division	Place	Copa del Rey
1954–55	5	2ª Reg.	12th	
1955–56	6	3ª Reg.	8th	
1956–57	5	2ª Reg.	8th	
1957–58	5	2ª Reg.	14th	
1958–59	5	2ª Reg.	13th	
1959–60	5	2ª Reg.	6th	
1960–61	5	2ª Reg.	1st	
1961–62	4	1ª Reg.	6th	
1962–63	4	1ª Reg.	8th	
1963–64	4	1ª Reg.	3rd	
1964–65	3	3ª	13th	
1965–66	3	3ª	15th	
1966–67	4	1ª Reg.	16th	
1967–68	5	2ª Reg.	8th	
1968–69	6	2ª Reg.	9th	
1969–70	6	2ª Reg.	3rd	
1970–71	5	1ª Reg.	13th	
1971–72	5	1ª Reg.	12th	
1972–73	5	1ª Reg.	15th	
1973–74	5	1ª Reg.	10th	

Season	Tier	Division	Place	Copa del Rey
1974–75	5	1ª Reg.	10th	
1975–76	5	1ª Reg.	12th	
1976–77	5	1ª Reg.	10th	
1977–78	6	1ª Reg.	17th	
1978–79	7	2ª Reg.	8th	
1979–80	7	2ª Reg.	2nd	
1980–81	6	1ª Reg.	9th	
1981–82	6	1ª Reg.	3rd	
1982–83	5	Reg. Pref.	8th	
1983–84	5	Reg. Pref.	14th	
1984–85	5	Reg. Pref.	19th	
1985–86	6	1ª Reg.	9th	
1986–87	6	1ª Reg.	2nd	
1987–88	5	Reg. Pref.	11th	
1988–89	5	Reg. Pref.	7th	
1989–90	5	Reg. Pref.	13th	
1990–91	5	Terr. Pref.	12th	
1991–92	5	Terr. Pref.	10th	
1992–93	5	Terr. Pref.	16th	
1993–94	6	1ª Terr.	1st	

Season	Tier	Division	Place	Copa del Rey
1994–95	5	Terr. Pref.	12th	
1995–96	5	Terr. Pref.	17th	
1996–97	5	Terr. Pref.	12th	
1997–98	5	Terr. Pref.	16th	
1998–99	6	1ª Terr.	9th	
1999–2000	6	1ª Terr.	10th	
2000–01	6	1ª Terr.	14th	
2001–02	6	1ª Terr.	17th	
2002–03	7	1ª Div.	7th	
2003–04	7	1ª Div.	7th	
2004–05	7	1ª Div.	6th	
2005–06	7	1ª Div.	3rd	
2006–07	7	1ª Div.	7th	
2007–08	7	1ª Div.	9th	
2008–09	7	1ª Div.	1st	
2009–10	6	Pref.	10th	
2010–11	6	Pref.	16th	
2011–12	7	1ª Div.	1st	
2012–13	6	Pref.	10th	
2013–14	6	Pref.	16th	

Season	Tier	Division	Place	Copa del Rey
2014–15	7	1ª Div.	5th	
2015–16	7	1ª Div.	3rd	
2016–17	7	1ª Div.	1st	
2017–18	6	Pref.	16th	
2018–19	7	1ª Div.	7th	
2019–20	7	1ª Div.	9th	
2020–21	DNP			
2021–22	8	1ª Div.	4th	
2022–23	8	1ª Div.	8th	
2023–24	8	1ª Div.	7th	
2024–25	8	1ª Div.	6th	
2025–26	8	1ª Div.		

- 2 season in Tercera División
