= Asier Goiria =

Spanish footballer

Personal information
- Full name: Asier Goiria Etxebarria
- Date of birth: 19 September 1980 (age 46)
- Place of birth: Amorebieta, Spain
- Height: 1.82 m (6 ft 0 in)
- Position: Striker

Senior career*
Years	Team	Apps	(Gls)
1998–2002	Amorebieta		
2001–2002	→ Gernika (loan)	25	(4)
2002–2004	Bilbao Athletic	66	(14)
2004–2005	Burgos	38	(10)
2005–2006	Logroñés	36	(3)
2006–2007	Burgos	38	(18)
2007–2008	Eibar	37	(14)
2008–2010	Numancia	53	(11)
2010–2012	Cartagena	42	(1)
2012	Girona	13	(1)
2012–2014	Mirandés	63	(6)
2014–2016	Amorebieta	51	(9)
2016–2017	Getxo	4	(4)
Total		466	(95)
- * Club domestic league appearances and goals

Asier Goiria Etxebarria (born 19 September 1980 in Amorebieta-Etxano, Basque Country) is a Spanish former professional footballer who played as a striker.

In summer 2017, Goiria was appointed sporting director for his hometown club SD Amorebieta, one of his many employers as a player, in the Segunda División B. On 11 June 2024, in the same capacity, he joined Real Murcia CF of the same league, now renamed Primera Federación.
