= César Palacios =

César Palacios may refer to:

- César Palacios (footballer, born 1974), Spanish football midfielder
- César Palacios (footballer, born 2004), Spanish football midfielder for Fulham and son of above

== See also ==
- Cesar Palacio, Canadian politician
