= 2007–08 Segunda División =

77th season of the second-tier football league in Spain

Segunda División
- Season: 2007–08
- Champions: Numancia
- Promoted: Málaga; Sporting Gijón; Numancia
- Relegated: Racing Ferrol; Cádiz; Granada 74; Polideportivo Ejido
- Matches: 462
- Goals: 1,080 (2.34 per match)
- Top goalscorer: Yordi (Xerez); 20 goals

The 2007–08 season was the 77th in the history of the Segunda División (known as the Liga BBVA for sponsorship reasons), the second tier of the Spanish football league system. The first matches of the season were played on 25 August 2007, and the season ended on 15 June 2008. Celta de Vigo, Real Sociedad, and Gimnàstic de Tarragona were the teams which were relegated from La Liga the previous season. Racing de Ferrol, Eibar, Sevilla Atlético, and Córdoba were the teams which were promoted from Segunda División B the previous season.

The first goal of the season was scored by Joseba del Olmo, who scored an 18th-minute goal for Eibar against Racing de Ferrol in the early kick-off. The first red card of the competition was given to Miguel Cobas of Las Palmas after a challenge on Numancia's Gorka Brit. The first hat-trick was scored by Yordi in the match between Xerez and Hércules.

== Teams ==
Location of teams in Segunda División 2007–08
Canary Islands

It was made up of the following teams:

Team	Home city	Stadium	Capacity
Alavés	Vitoria-Gasteiz	Mendizorrotza	19,840
Albacete	Albacete	Carlos Belmonte	17,500
Cádiz	Cádiz	Ramón de Carranza	15,000
Castellón	Castellón	Nou Estadi Castàlia	14,485
Celta Vigo	Vigo	Balaídos	31,800
Córdoba	Córdoba	Nuevo Arcángel	18,280
Eibar	Eibar	Ipurua	6,267
Elche	Elche	Martínez Valero	36,017
Gimnàstic	Tarragona	Nou Estadi	14,500
Granada 74	Motril	Escribano Castilla	5,400
Hércules	Alicante	José Rico Pérez	29,500
Las Palmas	Las Palmas de Gran Canaria	Gran Canaria	31,250
Málaga	Málaga	La Rosaleda	28,963
Numancia	Soria	Nuevo Los Pajaritos	9,800
Polideportivo Ejido	El Ejido	Santo Domingo	7,870
Racing de Ferrol	Ferrol	A Malata	12,024
Real Sociedad	San Sebastián	Anoeta	39,500
Salamanca	Villares de la Reina	El Helmántico	17,341
Sevilla Atlético	Seville	Ramón Sánchez Pizjuán	42,714
Sporting de Gijón	Gijón	El Molinón	25,885
Tenerife	Santa Cruz de Tenerife	Heliodoro Rodríguez López	22,824
Xerez	Jerez de la Frontera	Chapín	20,523

== League table ==
Pos	Team	Pld	W	D	L	GF	GA	GD	Pts	Promotion or relegation
1	Numancia (C, P)	42	22	11	9	59	38	+21	77	Promotion to La Liga
2	Málaga (P)	42	20	12	10	58	42	+16	72 (Note: SPG 0–1 MÁL; MÁL 3–2 SPG)	Promotion to La Liga
3	Sporting Gijón (P)	42	20	12	10	61	40	+21	72	Promotion to La Liga
4	Real Sociedad	42	18	14	10	55	39	+16	68	
5	Castellón	42	16	13	13	42	37	+5	61	
6	Hércules	42	14	16	12	66	55	+11	58	
7	Salamanca	42	13	18	11	52	44	+8	57 (Note: LPA 1–2 SAL; SAL 2–2 LPA)	
8	Las Palmas	42	15	12	15	51	55	−4	57	
9	Sevilla Atlético	42	14	14	14	43	48	−5	56	
10	Elche	42	14	12	16	44	50	−6	54	
11	Tenerife	42	12	17	13	51	57	−6	53	
12	Albacete	42	13	13	16	37	40	−3	52 (Note: ALB: 15 pts; EIB: 14 pts; GIM: 10 pts; XER: 8 pts; CEL: 5 pts)	
13	Eibar	42	14	10	18	42	51	−9	52	
14	Gimnàstic de Tarragona	42	12	16	14	49	51	−2	52	
15	Xerez	42	12	16	14	47	56	−9	52	
16	Celta de Vigo	42	13	13	16	56	55	+1	52	
17	Alavés	42	12	15	15	41	47	−6	51	
18	Córdoba	42	11	17	14	50	56	−6	50 (Note: RFE 0–1 CÓR; CÓR 1–0 RFE)	
19	Racing Ferrol (R)	42	12	14	16	46	51	−5	50	Relegation to Segunda División B
20	Cádiz (R)	42	12	13	17	40	47	−7	49	Relegation to Segunda División B
21	Granada 74 (R)	42	10	15	17	45	59	−14	45	Relegation to Segunda División B
22	Poli Ejido (R)	42	11	11	20	37	54	−17	44	Relegation to Segunda División B

Source: LFP - Liga Adelante
Rules for classification: 1st points; 2nd head-to-head points; 3rd head-to-head goal difference; 4th head-to-head goals scored; 5th goal difference; 6th number of goals scored; 7th Fair-play points
(C) Champions; (P) Promoted; (R) Relegated

== Results ==
Home \ Away	ALA	ALB	CÁD	CAS	CDV	CÓR	EIB	ELC	GIM	G74	HÉR	LPA	MÁL	NUM	PEJ	RAC	RSO	SAL	SAT	SGI	TEN	XER
Alavés	—	0–0	1–1	0–0	2–3	0–2	1–0	2–0	1–1	2–2	2–1	3–1	0–1	1–1	2–1	1–0	3–2	0–0	1–0	0–0	0–0	0–0
Albacete	0–3	—	0–1	2–0	1–1	0–1	1–0	0–1	0–0	3–2	1–1	3–1	2–1	1–4	2–0	1–2	1–2	2–1	1–0	1–2	0–0	1–0
Cádiz	2–0	2–1	—	1–1	3–1	0–1	1–2	1–1	0–2	2–0	1–2	0–0	0–1	0–0	2–0	3–1	2–2	1–0	0–0	0–1	0–0	2–1
Castellón	2–0	0–2	2–0	—	2–1	1–1	0–0	1–0	3–1	2–1	0–0	1–1	2–3	0–0	1–0	1–0	1–0	1–0	0–0	1–0	1–1	1–0
Celta Vigo	2–3	0–1	5–2	1–2	—	1–1	0–1	2–2	1–1	4–1	1–0	2–0	1–2	2–2	2–1	1–1	1–1	0–0	2–1	0–0	2–2	3–1
Córdoba	0–1	1–1	2–2	2–1	0–2	—	0–1	1–1	2–2	0–0	3–3	0–1	2–1	3–2	1–1	1–0	1–3	1–1	2–1	2–2	2–2	2–1
Eibar	2–0	1–0	1–0	1–2	2–1	2–1	—	2–1	2–0	2–0	0–3	2–2	1–1	1–0	1–0	1–3	0–1	2–2	0–1	0–3	4–0	0–0
Elche	2–2	1–1	1–0	1–0	2–0	3–2	1–1	—	2–0	0–0	0–2	1–4	2–0	1–1	2–1	0–1	0–0	0–3	2–0	3–1	3–1	2–4
Gimnàstic	2–0	0–2	0–1	1–0	2–1	2–2	2–1	1–2	—	3–2	2–2	2–0	1–1	1–2	4–1	0–0	1–1	1–2	1–0	2–0	1–1	1–1
Granada 74	2–2	1–0	2–1	1–1	1–1	0–2	1–0	0–0	1–0	—	2–3	0–3	0–0	1–1	1–0	3–3	1–2	0–0	1–1	1–0	4–1	1–1
Hércules	1–1	2–0	1–1	1–0	0–1	2–1	5–1	0–1	3–0	0–0	—	1–2	1–1	1–3	1–2	1–0	1–1	2–2	1–2	2–3	2–1	2–2
Las Palmas	2–1	2–1	2–0	1–1	1–0	3–1	1–0	1–0	1–0	0–1	0–0	—	1–2	1–2	2–1	2–2	2–3	1–2	0–1	2–2	1–1	0–0
Málaga	1–0	0–0	0–0	3–1	1–1	4–1	1–0	2–0	1–2	1–1	4–6	2–0	—	0–1	1–1	4–2	0–2	3–0	3–0	3–2	2–1	1–0
Numancia	0–0	1–0	0–1	2–2	1–2	2–1	1–1	0–1	1–0	0–2	2–1	3–0	2–1	—	2–2	1–0	2–1	1–0	0–1	0–2	4–2	2–1
Polideportivo Ejido	1–0	0–0	1–0	1–0	0–1	1–0	1–0	2–0	1–1	1–0	0–0	3–1	2–3	1–2	—	1–3	0–1	1–1	2–0	1–1	1–1	0–0
Racing de Ferrol	1–1	1–1	2–1	1–0	2–1	0–1	1–1	1–0	0–2	1–3	1–1	3–1	0–0	1–3	2–0	—	0–0	0–2	1–1	2–2	0–0	1–2
Real Sociedad	1–0	1–0	0–0	0–2	1–1	1–1	1–1	2–1	0–0	3–1	2–1	4–0	2–0	0–1	0–1	1–2	—	1–1	2–0	0–1	2–1	4–2
Salamanca	2–3	0–1	1–1	1–0	3–1	1–1	1–0	3–1	1–1	3–1	1–1	2–2	0–0	0–1	4–1	2–1	3–2	—	0–1	1–1	1–0	2–2
Sevilla Atlético	1–0	0–0	1–2	2–2	2–1	2–1	2–0	2–1	2–0	4–2	3–4	0–0	0–1	1–1	2–2	2–1	0–0	2–1	—	1–3	1–1	1–1
Sporting Gijón	3–2	1–0	4–2	0–2	0–1	2–1	2–0	1–1	3–3	2–1	1–1	0–1	0–1	1–0	4–0	0–0	1–0	0–0	4–1	—	0–1	2–0
Tenerife	1–0	2–2	2–0	2–1	3–2	0–0	4–2	1–1	2–1	2–0	0–1	2–2	1–1	0–2	2–1	2–1	1–2	2–1	1–1	0–2	—	3–1
Xerez	3–0	1–1	2–1	2–1	1–0	0–0	3–3	1–0	2–2	2–1	4–3	0–3	1–0	0–3	1–0	0–2	1–1	1–1	0–0	0–2	2–1	—

Source: BDFutbol
Legend: Blue = home team win; Yellow = draw; Red = away team win.

== Pichichi Trophy ==
Goalscorers	Goals	Penalties	Team
(Spain) Yordi	20	8	Xerez
(Spain) Nino	19	1	Tenerife
(Spain) José Juan Luque	17	10	Granada 74
(Spain) Iñigo Díaz de Cerio	16	0	Real Sociedad
(Spain) Jesús Perera	15	0	Celta Vigo
(Spain) Marcos Márquez	15	4	Las Palmas
(Spain) Antonio Hidalgo	14	3	Málaga
(Spain) Asier Goiria	14	5	Eibar
(Spain) David Rodríguez	14	2	Salamanca
(Spain) Quique Martín	14	4	Salamanca

== Zamora Trophy ==
Goalkeeper	Goals	Matches	Average	Team
(Spain) Carlos Sánchez	27	33	0.82	Castellón
(Spain) Jacobo	29	32	0.91	Numancia
(Spain) Asier Riesgo	39	42	0.93	Real Sociedad
(Spain) Roberto	39	41	0.95	Sporting Gijón
(Spain) Iñaki Goitia	41	40	1.03	Málaga
(Spain) Pedro Contreras	37	36	1.03	Cádiz
(Argentina) Willy Caballero	41	38	1.08	Elche
(Spain) Bernardo	42	38	1.11	Alavés
(Spain) Javi Varas	46	41	1.12	Sevilla Atlético
(Spain) Juan Pablo	33	29	1.14	Tenerife

== Season statistics ==
=== Scoring ===
- First goal of the season: Joseba del Olmo for Eibar against Racing de Ferrol (25 August 2007)
- Fastest goal in a match: 10 seconds – Nabil Baha for Málaga against Cádiz (5 January 2008)
- Goal scored at the latest point in a match: 90+6 minutes – Quique Martín for Salamanca against Granada 74 (16 September 2007)
- Widest winning margin: 4
  - Sporting Gijón 4–0 Polideportivo Ejido (26 August 2007)
  - Real Sociedad 4–0 Las Palmas (17 February 2008)
  - Eibar 4–0 Tenerife (22 March 2008)
  - Hércules 5–1 Eibar (26 April 2008)
- Most goals in a match: 10 – Málaga 4-6 Hércules (18 May 2008)
- First hat-trick of the season: Yordi for Xerez against Hércules (27 January 2008)
- First own goal of the season: Jordi Ferrón for Hércules against Albacete (9 September 2007)
- Most goals by one player in a single match: 3
  - Yordi for Xerez against Hércules (27 January 2008)
  - Asier Goiria for Eibar against Tenerife (22 March 2008)
  - Antonio Hidalgo for Málaga against Hércules (18 May 2008)
- Most goals by one team in a match: 6 – Málaga 4–6 Hércules (18 May 2008)
- Most goals in one half by one team: 5 – Málaga 4–6 Hércules (18 May 2008)
- Most goals scored by losing team: 4 – Málaga 4–6 Hércules (18 May 2008)

=== Cards ===
- First yellow card: Diego Jaume for Hércules against Xerez (25 August 2007)
- First red card: Miguel Cobas for Las Palmas against Numancia (25 August 2007)

== Attendances ==
No.	Club	Average	Highest
1	Real Sociedad	20,129	32,564
2	Málaga	20,000	35,000
3	Real Sporting	16,771	25,000
4	Cádiz	14,814	17,500
5	Las Palmas	11,641	29,132
6	Tenerife	10,710	17,693
7	Córdoba	9,986	13,000
8	Castellón	9,976	13,000
9	Elche	8,781	13,000
10	Xerez	7,960	18,136
11	Gimnàstic de Tarragona	7,713	11,500
12	Hércules	7,621	17,000
13	Alavés	7,301	15,542
14	Celta de Vigo	6,706	11,000
15	Albacete	6,337	17,000
16	Salamanca	5,743	10,767
17	Numancia	5,048	10,000
18	Ejido	3,890	5,500
19	Ferrol	3,462	8,000
20	Sevilla Atlético	3,357	10,000
21	Granada 74	2,693	4,000
22	Eibar	2,353	3,540
