= Juanma (footballer, born 1978) =

Spanish footballer

Personal information
- Full name: Juan Manuel Valero Martínez
- Date of birth: 3 January 1978 (age 48)
- Place of birth: Alicante, Spain
- Height: 1.80 m (5 ft 11 in)
- Position: Right-back

Youth career
- Murcia

Senior career*
Years	Team	Apps	(Gls)
1994–1996	Murcia B		
1996–2008	Murcia	265	(5)
2007–2008	→ Hércules (loan)	30	(1)
2009–2011	Orihuela	76	(1)
Total		371+	(7+)
- * Club domestic league appearances and goals

Juan Manuel Valero Martínez (born 3 January 1978), known as Juanma, is a Spanish former professional footballer who played as a right-back.

He spent the vast majority of his 17-year senior career with Murcia.

== Career ==
Born in Alicante, Valencian Community, Juanma made his professional debut with Real Murcia CF, first playing with the reserves and moving to the first team aged 18. He helped the latter return to Segunda División in 2000, then retained his first-choice status in the next seasons; in 2002–03 he appeared in 34 matches as the club returned to La Liga after a 14-year absence, only to be immediately relegated.

In summer 2007, at the end of another top-division promotion, longtime captain Juanma was deemed surplus to requirements by new coach Javier Clemente, and served a loan at Hércules CF. He spent some months training separately after that and, having arranged for a release with the board of directors, joined Orihuela CF in the Segunda División B in January 2009.

Juanma retired in June 2011 at the age of 33, after a further two full campaigns with Orihuela always in the third tier.

== Honours ==
Murcia

- Segunda División: 2002–03
