= José Manuel Yanguas =

Spanish footballer (born 1972)

José Manuel Yanguas Calleja (born 20 June 1972) is a Spanish former footballer who played as a defender.

== Early life ==
Yanguas was born in 1972 in Tudela, Spain, and joined the youth academy of Spanish side Osasuna as a youth player.

== Club career ==
Yanguas started his career with Spanish side Osasuna, where he helped the club escape relegation to the Spanish third tier in 1997, called the "Miracle of Martín", staying at the club until 2003 and making 252 appearances for them. He was captain of Osasuna.

After that, he helped Osasuna earn promotion to the Spanish La Liga. However, during the 2002/03 season, he played significantly less for Osasuna. In total, he made 112 appearances in the Spanish La Liga. He went on to play for Getafe and Numancia before retiring.

== International career ==
Yanguas played for the Navarre autonomous football team.

== Style of play ==
Yanguas mainly operated as a right defender.

== Personal life ==
Yanguas is the brother of footballer Kiko Yanguas.
