= César Cruchaga =

Spanish footballer (born 1974)

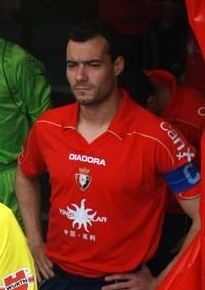
- Cruchaga before a game with Osasuna in 2009

Personal information
- Full name: César Cruchaga Lasa
- Date of birth: 26 January 1974 (age 52)
- Place of birth: Ezcároz, Spain
- Height: 1.84 m (6 ft 0 in)
- Position: Centre-back

Youth career
- Osasuna

Senior career*
| Years | Team | Apps | (Gls) |
| 1992–1996 | Osasuna B | 107 | (4) |
| 1996–2009 | Osasuna | 343 | (15) |
| 1996–1997 | → Gavà (loan) | 35 | (0) |
| Total | | 485 | (19) |

International career
| 2001–2006 | Basque Country | 4 | (0) |
| 2003–2005 | Navarre | 3 | (0) |
- * Club domestic league appearances and goals

César Cruchaga Lasa (born 26 January 1974) is a Spanish former professional footballer who played as a central defender.

He all but spent his 17-year senior career with Osasuna, appearing in 386 official matches for the club and reaching the final of the 2005 Copa del Rey.

== Club career ==
Cruchaga was born in Ezcároz – Ezkaroze. A product of Navarrese club CA Osasuna's youth ranks, he played one season on loan to lowly CF Gavà before making his first-team debut on 14 September 1997, in a Segunda División 0–0 home draw against Albacete Balompié. He went on to total 249 games and nine goals in La Liga, where he first appeared on 10 September 2000 in a 0–2 home loss to RC Celta de Vigo, and played 36 matches in his first year in the top tier.

Cruchaga was part of the team's run in the 2006–07 UEFA Cup, in which they finally bowed out to eventual winners Sevilla FC in the semi-finals, participating in 12 games and completing 11. For the vast majority of his stay, he was the undisputed captain.

In 2008–09, Cruchaga made only ten league appearances, and announced his retirement from football prior to the end of the campaign, still being started in the 31 May 2009 decider against Real Madrid, where the 2–1 home victory guaranteed top-flight permanence for a further year.
