= Gorka Brit =

Spanish footballer

Personal information
- Full name: Gorka Brit Gallego
- Date of birth: 19 April 1978 (age 48)
- Place of birth: San Sebastián, Spain
- Height: 1.76 m (5 ft 9 in)
- Position: Striker

Youth career
- 1995–1996: Real Sociedad

Senior career*
Years	Team	Apps	(Gls)
1996–1998	Real Sociedad B		
1998–1999	Beasain	37	(5)
1999	Levante B		
1999–2001	Águilas		
2001–2002	UPV		
2001–2002	Beasain	22	(15)
2002–2003	Osasuna B	13	(10)
2002–2006	Osasuna	17	(1)
2003–2004	→ Eibar (loan)	38	(13)
2004–2005	→ Salamanca (loan)	39	(16)
2006	→ Eibar (loan)	6	(0)
2006–2009	Numancia	84	(19)
2009–2012	Real Unión	100	(29)
2012–2014	Beasain	66	(17)
- * Club domestic league appearances and goals

Gorka Brit Gallego (born 19 April 1978) is a Spanish former professional footballer who played as a striker.

He amassed Segunda División totals of 177 games and 59 goals over six seasons, in representation of Eibar, Salamanca, Numancia and Real Unión. In La Liga, he played with Numancia and Osasuna for a total of 48 matches.

== Club career ==
Brit was born in San Sebastián, Gipuzkoa. Having grown through the ranks of Real Sociedad and played as a senior with modest clubs, mostly in the Basque Country, he made his debut in La Liga with CA Osasuna in the 2002–03 season. Subsequently, he served three loans in the Segunda División and, after only 17 games with the Navarrese's main squad over two separate campaigns, was released in summer 2006.

In 2007–08, Brit was an important member for CD Numancia in their championship-winning season after having joined the Soria side the previous year, contributing 26 matches and nine goals to this feat. Highlights included braces in 2–1 wins against Xerez CD (home) and UD Las Palmas (away).

Brit returned to the Basque region in late July 2009, signing for Real Unión who had recently promoted to the second tier. He experienced one of his best seasons as a professional by scoring 14 league goals, but the team was immediately relegated.

== Honours ==
Numancia

- Segunda División: 2007–08
