= Iñaki Muñoz =

Spanish footballer (born 1978)

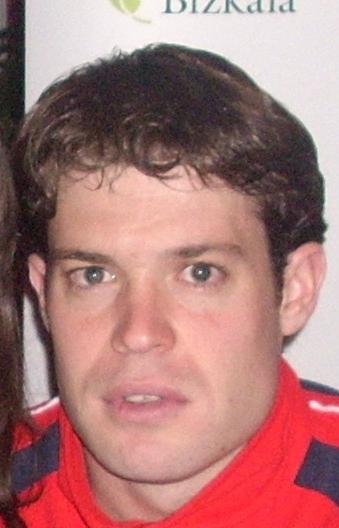
- Muñoz in 2008

Personal information
- Full name: Iñaki Muñoz Oroz
- Date of birth: 2 July 1978 (age 48)
- Place of birth: Pamplona, Spain
- Height: 1.81 m (5 ft 11 in)
- Position: Midfielder

Youth career
- Osasuna

Senior career*
Years	Team	Apps	(Gls)
1997–2001	Osasuna B	103	(15)
2000–2001	→ Toledo (loan)	32	(3)
2000–2007	Osasuna	132	(11)
2007–2010	Athletic Bilbao	19	(0)
2010–2011	Cartagena	24	(2)
2011–2012	Salamanca	20	(2)
2013	Izarra	10	(0)
Total		340	(33)

International career
1996	Spain U18	2	(0)
2003–2005	Navarre	3	(1)
2006–2007	Basque Country	3	(0)
- * Club domestic league appearances and goals

Iñaki Muñoz Oroz (born 2 July 1978) is a Spanish former professional footballer who played as a midfielder.

He amassed La Liga totals of 150 matches and 11 goals over nine seasons, representing in the competition Osasuna and Athletic Bilbao.

== Club career ==
=== Osasuna ===
Muñoz was born in Pamplona, Navarre. Except for a season-long loan to CD Toledo in the Segunda División B, he spent ten at his hometown club CA Osasuna, the first and the second teams combined. He made his La Liga debut with the former on 23 December 2001, coming on as a late substitute in a 1–0 home loss against Athletic Bilbao.

Muñoz went on to become an important first-team member, appearing in 30 games during 2005–06 as they finished fourth in the league and qualified for the UEFA Champions League while scoring five goals in as many wins, notably the winners at Deportivo de La Coruña and Atlético Madrid. In the previous campaign's Copa del Rey, he netted five times in eight matches to help Osasuna to reach the final of the competition, notably once in the 3–1 quarter-final home victory over Sevilla FC (4–3 aggregate).

=== Athletic Bilbao ===
Muñoz switched west for 2007–08, moving to Basque neighbours Athletic Bilbao on a three-year contract. He appeared sparingly in his first season, and even less in the second and third – his 2009–10 output consisted of 30 minutes against Deportivo in the last matchday.

Muñoz scored his only competitive goal for the side on 31 January 2008, in a 3–3 home draw with Racing de Santander in the Spanish Cup quarter-finals.

=== Later years ===
In summer 2010, aged 32, the free agent Muñoz signed with FC Cartagena of Segunda División. He retired three years later, after lower-league spells at UD Salamanca and CD Izarra.

== International career ==
Muñoz represented both the Basque and Navarrese autonomous teams, earning six caps in total.
