= José Manuel Mateo =

Spanish footballer and manager

Personal information
- Full name: José Manuel Mateo Azcona
- Date of birth: 23 January 1975 (age 51)
- Place of birth: Pamplona, Spain
- Height: 1.82 m (5 ft 11 1/2 in)
- Position: Centre back

Youth career
- Osasuna

Senior career*
Years	Team	Apps	(Gls)
1994–1996	Osasuna B	56	(0)
1996–2004	Osasuna	183	(9)
2004–2005	Valladolid	38	(2)
2005–2006	Recreativo	34	(1)
2006–2009	Alavés	66	(1)
Total		377	(13)

Managerial career
- 2010–2013: Osasuna (youth)
- 2013–2014: Alavés B
- 2014–2015: Osasuna B
- 2015: Osasuna
- 2015–2017: Osasuna B
- 2018: Burgos
- * Club domestic league appearances and goals

José Manuel Mateo Azcona (born 23 January 1975) is a Spanish retired footballer who played as a central defender, and a current manager.

== Playing career ==
Born in Pamplona, Navarre, Mateo finished his formation at CA Osasuna, and made his senior debuts with the reserves in 1994. He was promoted to the main squad in 1996, and played his first match as a professional on 31 August, featuring the full 90 minutes in a 0–0 Segunda División away draw against UE Lleida.

Mateo scored his first professional goal on 8 March 1997, netting the first in a 1–1 home draw against CD Ourense. He was an ever-present figure in the 1999–2000 season, appearing in 40 matches and scoring a career-best three goals as his team returned to La Liga after a six-year absence.

On 10 September 2000, Mateo made his debut in the Spanish top flight, starting in a 0–2 home loss to RC Celta de Vigo. He scored his first goal in the competition on 29 October, netting the first in a 1–2 defeat with Valencia CF also at the El Sadar Stadium.

On 3 July 2004, after eight years in the Rojillos' first team, Mateo moved to second level club Real Valladolid. He remained in the same division in the following years, representing Recreativo de Huelva and Deportivo Alavés and retiring with the latter in 2009 at the age of 34.

== Coaching career ==
After his retirement, Mateo was appointed manager of Osasuna's youth sides in 2010, and was dismissed after three years in charge. On 2 July 2013 he was named Deportivo Alavés B coach, but was sacked on 24 February of the following year.

In July 2014, Mateo returned to Osasuna and its reserves, now competing in Tercera División. On 28 February of the following year he was named manager of the first team, replacing the fired Jan Urban; he was himself relieved of his duties on 4 May, after six losses in only ten games.

Mateo returned to Osasuna's B-side on 21 July 2015, being appointed manager. On 7 June 2018, nearly one year after leaving them, he was named Burgos CF coach. After losing five of his first nine matches, he was dismissed by the third-tier club on 21 October.

== Managerial statistics ==
As of 21 October 2018

Managerial record by team and tenure
Team	Nat	From	To	Record								Ref
Team	Nat	From	To	G	W	D	L	GF	GA	GD	Win %	Ref
Alavés B	(Spain)	2 July 2013	24 February 2014	27	13	8	6	39	22	+17	48.15	
Osasuna B	(Spain)	11 July 2014	28 February 2015	27	16	5	6	45	20	+25	59.26	
Osasuna	(Spain)	28 February 2015	4 May 2015	10	1	3	6	5	17	−12	10.00	
Osasuna B	(Spain)	21 July 2015	24 May 2017	82	41	18	23	137	84	+53	50.00	
Burgos	(Spain)	7 June 2018	21 October 2018	9	2	2	5	4	9	−5	22.22	
Total				155	73	36	46	230	152	+78	47.10	—
