= Francisco Puñal =

Spanish footballer

Patxi Puñal
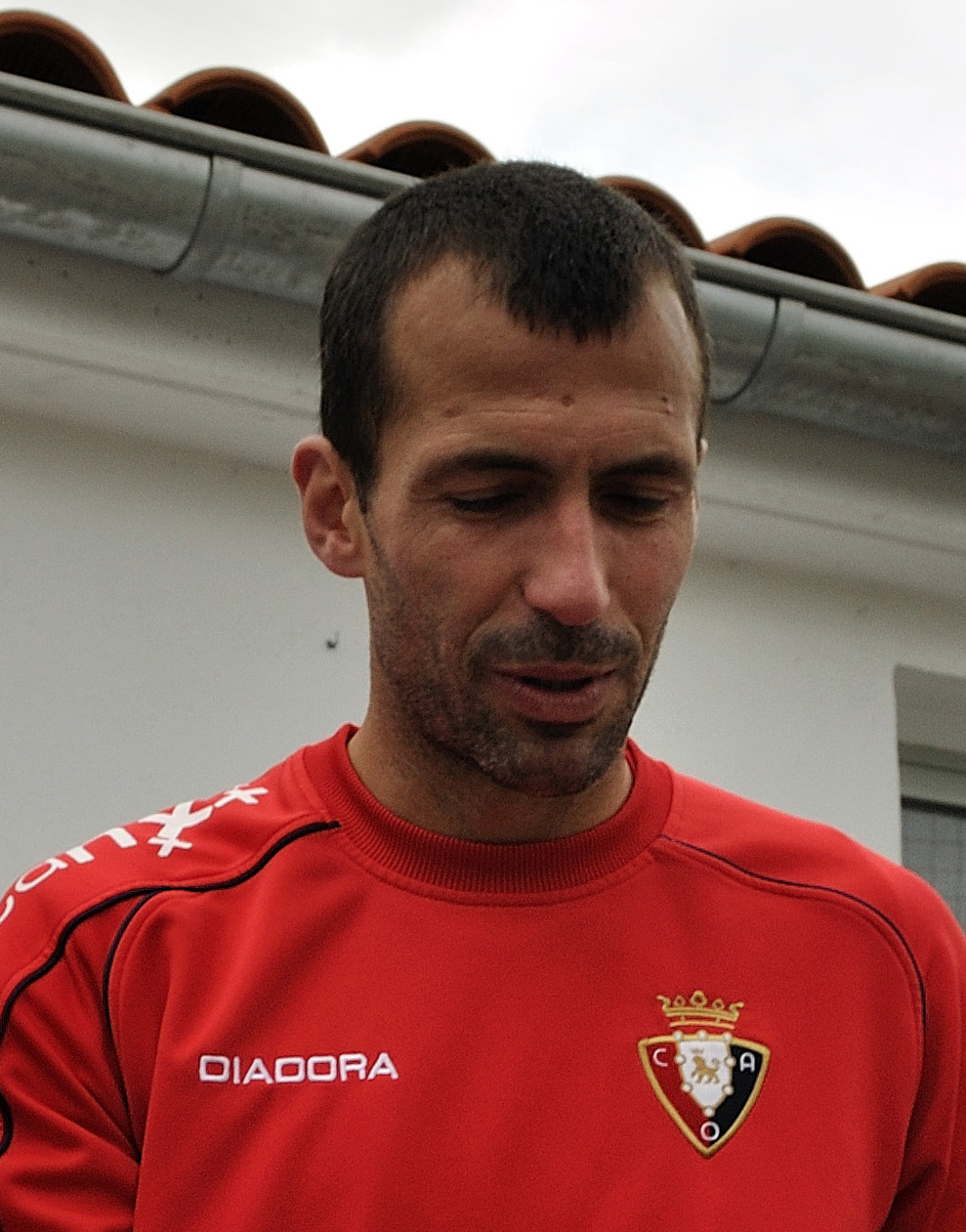
- Puñal with Osasuna in 2010

Personal information
- Full name: Francisco Puñal Martínez
- Date of birth: 6 September 1975 (age 51)
- Place of birth: Huarte, Spain
- Height: 1.79 m (5 ft 10 in)
- Position: Defensive midfielder

Youth career
- Natación Pamplona
- Osasuna

Senior career*
Years	Team	Apps	(Gls)
1994–1998	Osasuna B	32	(4)
1994–1995	→ Oberena (loan)		
1995–1996	→ Egüés (loan)		
1997–2014	Osasuna	458	(23)
1999–2001	→ Leganés (loan)	62	(11)
Total		552+	(38+)

International career
2002–2007	Basque Country	3	(0)
2003–2004	Navarre	2	(0)
- * Club domestic league appearances and goals

Francisco "Patxi" Puñal Martínez (born 6 September 1975) is a Spanish former professional footballer who played as a defensive midfielder.

The vast bulk of his career was connected with Osasuna, where he was often charged with penalty-taking and for which he appeared in 513 competitive matches.

== Club career ==
Born in Huarte, Navarre, Puñal played his entire professional career with CA Osasuna save for two on-loan seasons at Madrid's CD Leganés, in the Segunda División. His first official game for the first team came on 15 June 1997 in a 1–1 away draw against SD Eibar, in the same tier.

Puñal returned to the El Sadar Stadium as an undisputed first choice, scoring his first La Liga goal on 27 October 2001 in a 4–0 home win over RCD Mallorca. In Osasuna's 2005–06 historical league campaign, which brought a best ever fourth-place finish, he netted four times in 34 matches.

On 29 November 2006, as the side went on to reach the last-four in the UEFA Cup, Puñal scored three goals (one in his net) in a 3–1 home defeat of Odense Boldklub in the group stage. He made 47 official appearances that season.

From 2007 to 2010, veteran Puñal continued to figure prominently for Osasuna, featuring in exactly 100 league games – scoring twice through penalties, in a 2–0 win at Getafe CF and a 2–1 home loss to Real Madrid, both goals coming during 2007–08 – and also being the captain after the retirement of César Cruchaga. During that timeframe, he was booked a total of 37 times.

Puñal finished 2012 on a high note, being a father for the first time and having appeared in a total of 470 competitive matches for his main club, a best-ever. He obtained the record after his 464th overall appearance on 21 October, against Real Betis, and on 26 May 2013 he again entered the team's history books, netting from 30 meters and contributing to a 2–1 home victory over Sevilla FC which certified permanence in the top division for another year, with one game remaining.

In 2014, Puñal was awarded the Gold Medal for Sporting Merit, the highest accolade of the kind granted by the Government of Navarre.

== International career ==
Puñal earned caps for both the Basque Country and Navarre autonomous teams.

== See also ==
- List of La Liga players (400+ appearances)
