= Sporting Club de Lutxana =

Spanish football club

Sporting de Lutxana
- Full name: Sporting Club de Lutxana
- Founded: 1919
- Ground: Serralta, Barakaldo, Basque Country, Spain
- Capacity: 1,995
- Chairman: (Spain) Felipe Ampudia
- Manager: (Spain) Txus González
- League: Preferente
- 2024–25: Primera División – Group 1, 2nd of 18 (promoted)
Home colours	Away colours

Sporting Club de Lutxana is a football team based in Barakaldo in the autonomous community of Basque Country. Founded in 1919, the team plays in Preferente. The club's home ground is Serralta, which has a capacity for 1,995 spectators.

== Season to season ==
Season	Tier	Division	Place	Copa del Rey
1928–29	8	3ª Reg.	5th	
1929–30	8	3ª Reg.	2nd	
1930–1934	DNP			
1934–35	5	2ª Reg. P.	4th	
1935–36	5	2ª Reg. P.	1st	
1936–1945	DNP			
1945–46	5	2ª Reg.	3rd	
1946–47	5	2ª Reg.	2nd	
1947–48	5	2ª Reg.	3rd	
1948–49	5	2ª Reg.	1st	
1949–50	5	2ª Reg.	7th	
1950–51	5	2ª Reg.	11th	
1951–52	6	3ª Reg.	2nd	
1952–53	5	2ª Reg.	1st	
1953–54	4	1ª Reg.	7th	
1954–55	4	1ª Reg.	8th	
1955–56	4	1ª Reg.	10th	
1956–57	4	1ª Reg.	11th	
1957–58	4	1ª Reg.	7th	
1958–59	4	1ª Reg.	10th	

Season	Tier	Division	Place	Copa del Rey
1959–60	4	1ª Reg.	11th	
1960–61	4	1ª Reg.	10th	
1961–62	4	1ª Reg.	9th	
1962–63	4	1ª Reg.	14th	
1963–64	5	2ª Reg.	5th	
1964–65	5	2ª Reg.	7th	
1965–66	5	2ª Reg.	9th	
1966–67	5	2ª Reg.	1st	
1967–68	4	1ª Reg.	6th	
1968–69	4	Reg. Pref.	2nd	
1969–70	3	3ª	20th	
1970–71	4	Reg. Pref.	14th	
1971–72	4	Reg. Pref.	8th	
1972–73	4	Reg. Pref.	18th	
1973–74	5	1ª Reg.	1st	
1974–75	4	Reg. Pref.	16th	
1975–76	4	Reg. Pref.	19th	
1976–77	5	1ª Reg.	7th	
1977–78	6	1ª Reg.	13th	
1978–79	6	1ª Reg.	20th	

Season	Tier	Division	Place	Copa del Rey
1979–80	7	2ª Reg.	3rd	
1980–81	7	2ª Reg.	3rd	
1981–82	7	2ª Reg.	4th	
1982–83	6	1ª Reg.	11th	
1983–84	6	1ª Reg.	5th	
1984–85	6	1ª Reg.	11th	
1985–86	6	1ª Reg.	8th	
1986–87	6	1ª Reg.	14th	
1987–88	6	1ª Reg.	2nd	
1988–89	5	Reg. Pref.	6th	
1989–90	5	Reg. Pref.	18th	
1990–91	6	1ª Terr.	1st	
1991–92	5	Terr. Pref.	9th	
1992–93	5	Terr. Pref.	13th	
1993–94	5	Terr. Pref.	20th	
1994–95	6	1ª Terr.	3rd	
1995–96	6	1ª Terr.	2nd	
1996–97	5	Terr. Pref.	14th	
1997–98	5	Terr. Pref.	14th	
1998–99	5	Terr. Pref.	7th	

Season	Tier	Division	Place	Copa del Rey
1999–2000	5	Terr. Pref.	4th	
2000–01	5	Terr. Pref.	13th	
2001–02	5	Terr. Pref.	12th	
2002–03	5	Div. Hon.	9th	
2003–04	5	Div. Hon.	16th	
2004–05	5	Div. Hon.	10th	
2005–06	5	Div. Hon.	11th	
2006–07	5	Div. Hon.	15th	
2007–08	5	Div. Hon.	18th	
2008–09	6	Pref.	2nd	
2009–10	5	Div. Hon.	16th	
2010–11	6	Pref.	18th	
2011–12	7	1ª Div.	16th	
2012–13	7	1ª Div.	2nd	
2013–14	6	Pref.	18th	
2014–15	7	1ª Div.	6th	
2015–16	7	1ª Div.	10th	
2016–17	7	1ª Div.	14th	
2017–18	7	1ª Div.	2nd	
2018–19	6	Pref.	15th	

Season	Tier	Division	Place	Copa del Rey
2019–20	7	1ª Div.	7th	
2020–21	DNP			
2021–22	8	1ª Div.	9th	
2022–23	8	1ª Div.	14th	
2023–24	8	1ª Div.	13th	
2024–25	8	1ª Div.	2nd	
2025–26	7	Pref.		

- 1 season in Tercera División
