= Josetxo =

Spanish footballer

Personal information
- Full name: José Manuel Romero Urtasun
- Date of birth: 25 February 1977 (age 49)
- Place of birth: Pamplona, Spain
- Height: 1.85 m (6 ft 1 in)
- Position: Centre-back

Youth career
- 1985–1993: Oberena
- 1993–1995: Osasuna

Senior career*
Years	Team	Apps	(Gls)
1995–2001	Osasuna B	82	(5)
1996–2011	Osasuna	260	(0)
1999–2000	→ Eibar (loan)	7	(0)
2011–2012	Huesca	23	(0)
Total		372	(5)

International career
1997	Spain U20	1	(0)
- * Club domestic league appearances and goals

José Manuel Romero Urtasun (born 25 February 1977), known as Josetxo, is a Spanish former professional footballer who played as a central defender.

He spent the vast majority of his career with Osasuna, appearing in 212 La Liga games over ten seasons.

== Club career ==
=== Osasuna ===
Josetxo was born in Pamplona, Navarre. Other than a Segunda División season-long loan at SD Eibar in 1999–2000, he spent the first 15 years of his career with hometown club CA Osasuna, making his La Liga debut on 1 December 2001 in a 2–1 away defeat against Real Madrid. He had previously appeared with the side in the second tier, as they returned to the top flight precisely as he was serving his loan.

In the 2000–01 campaign, after returning to his alma mater, Josetxo played the last of his three seasons with the reserve side in the Segunda División B. He contributed 36 games to a final eighth place, scoring three goals.

Josetxo appeared in 29 matches as Osasuna finished fourth in 2005–06, thus qualifying for the UEFA Champions League; in the subsequent run in the UEFA Cup, he played nine games to help his team to reach the semi-finals. He signed a three-year contract extension in December 2006, going on to be regularly used the following four years (he was also sent off four times), always spent in the top flight.

=== Later career ===
On 5 July 2011, the 34-year-old Josetxo left Osasuna and signed a one-year deal with SD Huesca in the second division. He retired at the end of the season.
