= 2007–08 Atlético Madrid season =

102nd season in existence of Atlético Madrid

Atlético Madrid
2007–08 season
- President: Enrique Cerezo
- Head coach: Javier Aguirre
- Stadium: Vicente Calderón
- La Liga: 4th
- UEFA Cup: Round of 32
- Copa del Rey: Quarter-finals
- UEFA Intertoto Cup: Winners
- Top goalscorer: League: Sergio Agüero (19); All: Sergio Agüero (27)
| Home colours | Away colours |

The 2007–08 season was the 102nd season in Atlético Madrid's history and their 71st season in La Liga, the top division of Spanish football. It covers a period from 1 July 2007 to 30 June 2008. In the wake of captain Fernando Torres departing for Liverpool, Atlético responded with the signings of Diego Forlán, Thiago Motta, Simão and José Antonio Reyes, aimed at propelling the club to the top. Atlético managed to take the final spot for the Champions League, finishing only three points behind Barcelona in third.

== Squad ==
| No. | Player | Nationality | Date of birth (age) | Signed from |
Goalkeepers
| 23 | Leo Franco | (Argentina) | 20 May 1977 (aged 30) | (Spain) Mallorca |
| 13 | Christian Abbiati | (Italy) | 8 July 1977 (aged 29) | (Italy) Milan |
| 1 | Ismael Falcón | (Spain) | 24 April 1984 (aged 23) | (Spain) Atlético Madrid B |
Defenders
| 22 | Pablo Ibáñez | (Spain) | 3 August 1981 (aged 25) | (Argentina) Albacete |
| 21 | Luis Perea | (Colombia) | 30 January 1979 (aged 28) | (Argentina) Boca Juniors |
| 12 | Fabiano Eller | (Brazil) | 16 November 1977 (aged 29) | (Turkey) Trabzonspor |
| 14 | Zé Castro | (Portugal) | 13 January 1983 (aged 24) | (Portugal) Académica Coimbra |
| 3 | Antonio López | (Spain) | 13 September 1981 (aged 25) | (Spain) Osasuna |
| 4 | Mariano Pernía | (Spain) | 4 May 1977 (aged 30) | (Spain) Getafe |
| 2 | Georgios Seitaridis | (Greece) | 4 June 1981 (aged 26) | (Russia) Dynamo Moscow |
| 4 | Juan Valera | (Spain) | 21 December 1984 (aged 22) | (Spain) Real Murcia |
Midfielders
| 5 | Thiago Motta | (Italy) | 28 August 1982 (aged 24) | (Spain) Barcelona |
| 18 | Maniche | (Portugal) | 11 November 1977 (aged 29) | (Russia) Dynamo Moscow |
| 6 | Cléber Santana | (Brazil) | 27 June 1981 (aged 26) | (Brazil) Santos |
| 35 | Joshua Zapata | (Spain) | 28 January 1989 (aged 18) | (Spain) Atlético Madrid B |
| 8 | Raúl García | (Spain) | 11 July 1986 (aged 20) | (Spain) Osasuna |
| 15 | José Manuel Jurado | (Spain) | 29 June 1986 (aged 21) | (Spain) Real Madrid |
Forwards
| 11 | Maxi Rodríguez | (Argentina) | 2 January 1981 (aged 26) | (Spain) Espanyol |
| 24 | Simão | (Portugal) | 31 October 1979 (aged 27) | (Portugal) Benfica |
| 9 | Luis García | (Spain) | 24 June 1978 (aged 29) | (England) Liverpool |
| 17 | José Antonio Reyes | (Spain) | 1 September 1983 (aged 23) | (England) Arsenal |
| 19 | Miguel de las Cuevas | (Spain) | 19 June 1986 (aged 21) | (Spain) Hércules CF |
| 10 | Sergio Agüero | (Argentina) | 2 June 1988 (aged 19) | (Argentina) Independiente |
| 7 | Diego Forlán | (Uruguay) | 19 May 1979 (aged 28) | (Spain) Villarreal CF |
| 20 | Mista | (Spain) | 12 November 1978 (aged 28) | (Spain) Valencia CF |

== Transfers ==
=== In ===
| Date | Pos. | No. | Player | Transferred from | Fee | Ref. |
|---|---|---|---|---|---|---|
| 30 June 2007 | FW | 7 | (Uruguay) Diego Forlán | (Spain) Villarreal | €21,000,000 | |
| 26 July 2007 | FW | 24 | (Portugal) Simão | (Portugal) Benfica | €20,000,000 | |
| 19 June 2007 | MF | 8 | (Spain) Raúl García | (Spain) Osasuna | €13,000,000 | |
| 30 July 2007 | FW | 17 | (Spain) José Antonio Reyes | (England) Arsenal | €12,000,000 | |
| July 2007 | MF | 6 | (Brazil) Cléber Santana | (Brazil) Santos | €8,000,000 | |
| 3 July 2007 | FW | 9 | (Spain) Luis García | (England) Liverpool | €4,000,000 | |
| 31 August 2007 | MF | 5 | (Italy) Thiago Motta | (Spain) Barcelona | €2,000,000 | |
| 26 June 2007 | GK | 13 | (Italy) Christian Abbiati | (Italy) Milan | Loan(€500k) | |

== Squad ==
=== Goalkeepers ===
- (Italy) Christian Abbiati
- (Argentina) (Italy) Leo Franco
- (Spain) Ismael Falcón

=== Defenders ===
- (Greece) Giourkas Seitaridis
- (Spain) Antonio López
- (Spain) (Argentina) Mariano Pernía
- (Brazil) Fabiano Eller
- (Portugal) Zé Castro
- (Colombia) (Spain) Luis Perea
- (Spain) Pablo Ibáñez
- (Spain) Juan Valera
- (Spain) Álvaro Domínguez
- (Spain) César Ortiz

=== Midfielders ===
- (Brazil) (Italy) Thiago Motta
- (Brazil) Cléber
- (Spain) Raúl García
- (Spain) Luis García
- (Argentina) (Italy) Maxi Rodríguez (C)
- (Spain) José Manuel Jurado
- (Spain) José Antonio Reyes
- (Portugal) Maniche
- (Spain) Miguel de las Cuevas
- (Portugal) Simão
- (Spain) Roberto Batres
- (Spain) Álex Quillo
- (Spain) Didi
- (Spain) Joshua
- (Spain) Ignacio Camacho

=== Attackers ===
- (Uruguay) (Spain) Diego Forlán
- (Argentina) Sergio Agüero
- (Spain) Mista

== Competitions ==
=== La Liga ===
==== League table ====
| Pos | Team | Pld | W | D | L | GF | GA | GD | Pts | Qualification or relegation |
|---|---|---|---|---|---|---|---|---|---|---|
| 2 | Villarreal | 38 | 24 | 5 | 9 | 63 | 40 | +23 | 77 | Qualification for the Champions League group stage |
| 3 | Barcelona | 38 | 19 | 10 | 9 | 76 | 43 | +33 | 67 | Qualification for the Champions League third qualifying round |
| 4 | Atlético Madrid | 38 | 19 | 7 | 12 | 66 | 47 | +19 | 64 (Note: ATM 4–3 SEV; SEV 1–2 ATM) | Qualification for the Champions League third qualifying round |
| 5 | Sevilla | 38 | 20 | 4 | 14 | 75 | 49 | +26 | 64 | Qualification for the UEFA Cup first round |
| 6 | Racing Santander | 38 | 17 | 9 | 12 | 42 | 41 | +1 | 60 | Qualification for the UEFA Cup first round |

Source: LFP
Rules for classification: 1st points; 2nd head-to-head points; 3rd head-to-head goal difference; 4th head-to-head goals scored; 5th goal difference; 6th number of goals scored; 7th Fair-play points

==== Matches ====
- Real Madrid–Atlético Madrid 2-1
- 0-1 Sergio Agüero 1'
- 1-1 Raúl 14'
- 2-1 Wesley Sneijder 78'
- Atlético Madrid–Mallorca 1-1
- 0-1 Daniel Güiza 18'
- 1-1 Mariano Pernía 77'
- Real Murcia–Atlético Madrid 1-1
- 0-1 Sergio Agüero 15'
- 1-1 Francisco Gallardo 81'
- Atlético Madrid–Racing Santander 4-0
- 1-0 Raúl García 12'
- 2-0 Sergio Agüero 69'
- 3-0 Diego Forlán 77'
- 4-0 Simão 87'
- Athletic Bilbao–Atlético Madrid 0-2
- 0-1 Sergio Agüero 12'
- 0-2 Diego Forlán 78'
- Atlético Madrid–Osasuna 2-0
- 1-0 Raúl García 38'
- 2-0 Sergio Agüero 81'
- BarcelonaAtlético Madrid 3-0
- 1-0 Deco 15'
- 2-0 Lionel Messi 20'
- 3-0 Xavi 90'
- Atlético Madrid–Real Zaragoza 4-0
- 1-0 Luis García 11'
- 2-0 Diego Forlán 34'
- 3-0 Maxi Rodríguez 64' (pen.)
- 4-0 Maxi Rodríguez 90 + 1'
- Levante–Atlético Madrid 0-1
- 0-1 Diego Forlán 27'
- Atlético Madrid–Sevilla 4-3
- 1-0 Maniche 2'
- 1-1 Luís Fabiano 14'
- 2-1 Sergio Agüero 17'
- 2-2 Zé Castro 45' (o.g.)
- 3-2 Maxi Rodríguez 70'
- 4-2 José Manuel Jurado 90 + 1'
- 4-3 Luís Fabiano 90 + 2'
- Atlético Madrid–Villarreal 3-4
- 1-0 Pablo 9'
- 2-0 Simão 25'
- 2-1 Giuseppe Rossi 31'
- 2-2 Fabricio Fuentes 42'
- 3-2 Sergio Agüero 62'
- 3-3 Nihat Kahveci 69'
- 3-4 Nihat Kahveci 90'
- Almería–Atlético Madrid 0-0
- Atlético Madrid–Valladolid 4-3
- 1-0 Maniche 3'
- 1-1 Víctor 40'
- 1-2 Sisi 47'
- 2-2 Maxi Rodríguez 49'
- 2-3 Joseba Llorente 54'
- 3-3 Maxi Rodríguez 55'
- 4-3 Pedro López 90 + 2' (o.g.)
- Betis–Atlético Madrid 0-2
- 0-1 Diego Forlán 34'
- 0-2 Raúl García 90 + 3'
- Atlético Madrid–Getafe 1-0
- 1-0 Diego Forlán 19'
- Recreativo de Huelva–Atlético Madrid 0-0
- Atlético Madrid–Espanyol 1-2
- 1-0 Simão 37'
- 1-1 Raúl Tamudo 53'
- 1-2 Luis García 84'
- Deportivo–Atlético Madrid 0-3
- 0-1 Diego Forlán 39'
- 0-2 Sergio Agüero 52'
- 0-3 José Manuel Jurado 65'
- Atlético Madrid–Valencia 1-0
- 1-0 Sergio Agüero 28'
- Atlético Madrid–Real Madrid 0-2
- 0-1 Raúl 1'
- 0-2 Ruud van Nistelrooy 41'
- Mallorca–Atlético Madrid 1-0
- 1-0 Juan Arango 21'
- Atlético Madrid–Real Murcia 1-1
- 0-1 Jofre 52' (pen.)
- 1-1 Luis García 62'
- Racing de Santander–Atlético Madrid 0-2
- 0-1 Diego Forlán 56'
- 0-2 Diego Forlán 74'
- Atlético Madrid–Athletic Bilbao 1-2
- 1-0 Antonio López 5'
- 1-1 Markel Susaeta 39'
- 1-2 Fernando Llorente 45'
- Osasuna–Atlético Madrid 3-1
- 1-0 Kike Sola 1'
- 2-0 Carlos Vela 5'
- 2-1 Diego Forlán 26'
- 3-1 Héctor Font 75'
- Atlético Madrid–Barcelona 4-2
- 0-1 Ronaldinho 30'
- 1-1 Sergio Agüero 36'
- 2-1 Maxi Rodríguez 42'
- 3-1 Diego Forlán 62' (pen.)
- 4-1 Sergio Agüero 71'
- 4-2 Samuel Eto'o 73'
- Real Zaragoza–Atlético Madrid 2-1
- 0-1 Simão 26'
- 1-1 Pablo 34' (o.g.)
- 2-1 Diego Milito 72' (pen.)
- Atlético Madrid–Levante 3-0
- 1-0 Simão 24'
- 2-0 Diego Forlán 39'
- 3-0 Diego Forlán 53'
- Sevilla–Atlético Madrid 1-2
- 0-1 Maxi Rodríguez 19'
- 1-1 Diego Capel 48'
- 1-2 Sergio Agüero 58'
- Villarreal–Atlético Madrid 3-0
- 1-0 Santi Cazorla 39'
- 2-0 Nihat Kahveci 43'
- 3-0 Nihat Kahveci 66'
- Atlético Madrid–Almería 6-3
- 1-0 Antonio López 2'
- 2-0 Diego Forlán 6' (pen.)
- 2-1 Felipe Melo 11'
- 2-2 Juanma Ortiz 18'
- 3-2 Simão 34'
- 3-3 Álvaro Negredo 37'
- 4-3 Simão 45'
- 5-3 Sergio Agüero 52'
- 6-3 Sergio Agüero 69'
- Valladolid–Atlético Madrid 1-1
- 0-1 Maxi Rodríguez 69'
- 1-1 Bartholomew Ogbeche 90'
- Atlético Madrid–Betis 1-3
- 0-1 Juande 15'
- 1-1 Sergio Agüero 25'
- 1-2 Xisco 49'
- 1-3 Capi 66'
- Getafe–Atlético Madrid 1-1
- 1-0 Juan Ángel Albín 13'
- 1-1 Sergio Agüero 39'
- Atlético Madrid–Recreativo de Huelva 3-0
- 1-0 Ignacio Camacho 23'
- 2-0 Sergio Agüero 54'
- 3-0 Ignacio Camacho 74'
- Espanyol–Atlético Madrid 0-2
- 0-1 Sergio Agüero 27'
- 0-2 Diego Forlán 30'
- Atlético Madrid–Deportivo 1-0
- 1-0 Diego Forlán 45'
- Valencia–Atlético Madrid 3-1
- 1-0 Giourkas Seitaridis 11' (o.g.)
- 2-0 David Villa 40'
- 3-0 David Villa 54'
- 3-1 Sergio Agüero 74'

== UEFA Cup ==
=== Group stage ===
- Lokomotiv Moscow–Atlético Madrid 3-3
- 0-1 Sergio Agüero 16'
- 1-1 Diniyar Bilyaletdinov 27'
- 1-2 Diego Forlán 47'
- 2-2 Peter Odemwingie 61'
- 3-2 Peter Odemwingie 64'
- 3-3 Sergio Agüero 85'
- Atlético Madrid–Aberdeen 2-0
- 1-0 Diego Forlán 45' (pen.)
- 2-0 Jamie Langfield 61' (o.g.)
- Copenhagen–Atlético Madrid 0-2
- 0-1 Simão 21'
- 0-2 Sergio Agüero 62'
- Atlético Madrid–Panathinaikos 2-1
- 0-1 Dimitris Salpingidis 34'
- 1-1 Luis García 74'
- 2-1 Simão 90'

=== Last 32 ===
- Bolton Wanderers–Atlético Madrid 1-0
- 1-0 El Hadji Diouf 74'
- Atlético Madrid–Bolton Wanderers 0-0

== Statistics ==
=== Top scorers ===
| Rank | Position | Number | Player | La Liga | Copa del Rey | UEFA Intertoto Cup | UEFA Cup | Total |
|---|---|---|---|---|---|---|---|---|
| 1 | FW | 10 | (Argentina) Sergio Agüero | 19 | 2 | 0 | 6 | 27 |
| 2 | FW | 7 | (Uruguay) Diego Forlán | 16 | 1 | 1 | 5 | 23 |
| 3 | MF | 11 | (Argentina) Maxi Rodríguez | 8 | 0 | 0 | 2 | 10 |
| 3 | MF | 24 | (Portugal) Simão | 7 | 0 | 0 | 3 | 10 |
| 5 | MF | 9 | (Spain) Luis García | 2 | 0 | 0 | 4 | 6 |
| 6 | MF | 8 | (Spain) Raúl García | 3 | 0 | 0 | 1 | 4 |
| 7 | MF | 15 | (Spain) Jurado | 2 | 0 | 0 | 1 | 3 |
| 7 | FW | 20 | (Spain) Mista | 0 | 2 | 0 | 1 | 3 |
| 9 | MF | 18 | (Portugal) Maniche^{1} | 2 | 0 | 0 | 0 | 2 |
| 9 | MF | 29 | (Spain) Ignacio Camacho | 2 | 0 | 0 | 0 | 2 |
| 11 | DF | 2 | (Greece) Giourkas Seitaridis | 0 | 0 | 1 | 0 | 1 |
| 11 | DF | 3 | (Spain) Antonio López | 1 | 0 | 0 | 0 | 1 |
| 11 | DF | 4 | (Spain) Mariano Pernía | 1 | 0 | 0 | 0 | 1 |
| 11 | DF | 22 | (Spain) Pablo Ibáñez | 1 | 0 | 0 | 0 | 1 |
| 11 | DF | 23 | (Spain) Juan Valera | 0 | 1 | 0 | 0 | 1 |
| Own goals | | | | 2 | 1 | 0 | 0 | 3 |
| Totals | | | | 66 | 7 | 2 | 23 | 98 |

^{1}Player left the club during the season.
