= Jhon =

Alternative spelling of the given name John

- Pronunciation: [ʝon]
- Gender: Male
- Language: Spanish

Origin
- Origin: Aestheticization or misspelling of English "John"
- Region of origin: Colombia

Other names
- Related names: John, Euan, Evan, Giovanni, Hans, Hovhannes, Ian, Ioan, Ioane, Ivan, Iban, Iven, Ifan, Jack, Jackson, Jan, Jane, Janez, Jean, Joan, João, Johan/Johann, Johanan, Johannes, Jon, Jonne, Jovan, Juhani, Seán, Shane, Siôn, Yahya, Yohannes, Zane

Jhon is an alternative spelling of the European given name John. Its usage is popular in South America, especially in Colombia, where it is one of the most common names in the country.

== Origin ==
Jhon originates from Hebrew Yohanan (יוֹחָנָן) 'Graced by Yah' or Yehohanan (יְהוֹחָנָן) 'Yahweh is Gracious'.

== Notable people with the name Jhon ==
=== Athletes ===
==== Footballers ====
- Jhon Arias (born 1997), Colombian midfielder
- Jhon Castillo (born 1983), Colombian forward
- Jhon Charría (born 1978), Colombian midfielder
- Jhon Cley Jesus Silva (born 1994), Brazilian midfielder
- Jhon Córdoba (born 1993), Colombian striker
- Jhon Culma (born 1981), Colombian former defensive midfielder
- Jhon Durán (born 2003), Colombian striker
- Jhon Epam (born 1983), Equatoguinean striker
- Jhon Kennedy Hurtado (born 1984), Colombian forward
- Jhon Jairo Mosquera (born 1988), Colombian forward
- Jhon Mosquera (born 1990), Colombian midfielder
- Jhon Obregón (born 1990), Colombian striker
- Jhon Pírez (born 1993), Uruguayan footballer
- Jhon Valencia (born 1982), Colombian midfielder
- Jhon Viáfara (born 1978), Colombian midfielder
- Jhon van Beukering (born 1983), Dutch-born Indonesian striker
- Jhon Lucumí (born 1997), Colombian defender
- Jhon Murillo (born 1995), Venezuelan forward
- Jhon Wilson Murillo (born 1990), Colombian midfielder

==== Cyclists ====
- Jhon Darwin Atapuma Hurtado (born 1988), Colombian cyclist
- Jhon García (born 1974), male professional track and road racing cyclist from Colombia
- Jhon González (born 1971), Colombian former cyclist
- Jhon Jarrín (1961–2021), Ecuadorian former cyclist
- Jhon Quiceno (born 1954), Colombian former cyclist
- Jhon Anderson Rodríguez (born 1996), Colombian cyclist

==== Other sports ====
- Jhon Édison Rodríguez (born 1991), Colombian fencer
- Jhon Obando (born 2001), Colombian para-athlete
- Jhon Romero (born 1995), Colombian baseball pitcher
- Jhon Solís (born 1993), Colombian sprinter

== See also ==
- Alternate forms for the name John
