= 2006–07 Atlético Madrid season =

101st season in existence of Atlético Madrid

Atlético Madrid
2006–07 season
- President: Enrique Cerezo
- Head coach: Javier Aguirre
- Stadium: Vicente Calderón
- La Liga: 7th
- Copa del Rey: Round of 16
- Top goalscorer: Fernando Torres (15)
- Biggest win: 4–1 vs Athletic Bilbao (17 Sept. 2006); 4–1 vs Getafe (13 May 2007)
- Biggest defeat: 0–6 vs FC Barcelona (20 May 2007)
| Home colours | Away (Red) colours | Away (Blue) colours |

The 2006–07 season was the 101st season in Atlético Madrid's history and their 70th season in La Liga, the top division of Spanish football. The season ran from 1 July 2006 to 30 June 2007. With the club-record signing of superstarlet Sergio Agüero as well as Mariano Pernía and Raúl García, Atlético aimed to repeat Aguirre's recent feat of taking Osasuna to the UEFA Champions League. The end result was 60 points, the best points haul in its five-season La Liga return, although this was not enough even for UEFA Cup qualification, which resulted in captain Fernando Torres departing for Liverpool, the transfer causing fury among the support. It was the sole season that he and Sergio Agüero played together.

The 2006–07 season was Atlético's most recent without participation in any European competition.

== Kit ==
In March 2006, Nike announced that the home kit for the forthcoming season will not use the usual stripes and feature halves instead, with the home kit consisting of halves in red and white and the away kit consisting of halves in navy blue and white. However, due to a massive negative reception from the fans, the club refused to use the red and white kit as their home choice. Finally, Nike decided to bring back the 2005–06 kit as their home choice, while both new kits will serve as away choices, depending on the color combinations used by the opposing team.

Supplier: (United States) Nike, Inc.
Sponsor(s): (South Korea) Kia Motors

| Home | Away | Third |

Source: Diario AS

== Squad ==
=== Goalkeepers ===
- (Argentina) (Italy) Leo Franco
- (Spain) Roberto
- (Spain) Ismael Falcón
- (Spain) Iván Cuéllar

=== Defenders ===
- (Greece) Giourkas Seitaridis
- (Spain) Antonio López
- (Spain) (Argentina) Mariano Pernía
- (Brazil) Fabiano Eller
- (Portugal) Zé Castro
- (Spain) Juan Valera
- (Colombia) Luis Perea
- (Spain) Pablo

=== Midfielders ===
- (France) Peter Luccin
- (Portugal) Costinha
- (Argentina) (Italy) Luciano Galletti
- (Spain) Gabi
- (Argentina) (Italy) Maxi Rodríguez
- (Spain) José Manuel Jurado
- (Bulgaria) Martin Petrov
- (Spain) Miguel de las Cuevas
- (Portugal) Maniche
- (Spain) Roberto Batres
- (Spain) Víctor Bravo
- (Spain) Pollo

=== Attackers ===
- (Spain) Fernando Torres
- (Argentina) Sergio Agüero
- (Spain) Mista
- (Spain) Fernando Marqués
- (Spain) Rufino

== Competitions ==
=== La Liga ===
==== League table ====
| Pos | Team | Pld | W | D | L | GF | GA | GD | Pts | Qualification or relegation |
|---|---|---|---|---|---|---|---|---|---|---|
| 5 | Villarreal | 38 | 18 | 8 | 12 | 48 | 44 | +4 | 62 | Qualification for the UEFA Cup first round |
| 6 | Zaragoza | 38 | 16 | 12 | 10 | 55 | 43 | +12 | 60 (Note: ATM 0–1 ZAR; ZAR 1–0 ATM) | Qualification for the UEFA Cup first round |
| 7 | Atlético Madrid | 38 | 17 | 9 | 12 | 47 | 40 | +7 | 60 | Qualification for the Intertoto Cup third round |
| 8 | Recreativo | 38 | 15 | 9 | 14 | 54 | 52 | +2 | 54 | |
| 9 | Getafe | 38 | 14 | 10 | 14 | 39 | 33 | +6 | 52 | Qualification for the UEFA Cup first round (Note: Since Sevilla, winners of 2006–07 Copa del Rey, was qualified for the 2007–08 UEFA Champions League, so losing cup finalists Getafe earned a spot in the first round of the 2007–08 UEFA Cup.) |

Source: LFP
Rules for classification: 1st points; 2nd head-to-head points; 3rd head-to-head goal difference; 4th head-to-head goals scored; 5th goal difference; 6th number of goals scored; 7th Fair-play points

==== Matches ====
| 27 August 2006 1 | Racing Santander | 0–1 | Atlético Madrid | Santander |
| 19:00 (CEST) | | Report | Torres 12' | Stadium: El Sardinero; Referee: Iturralde González |

| 9 September 2006 2 | Atlético Madrid | 0–1 | Valencia | Madrid |
| 22:00 (CEST) | | Report | Villa 7' | Stadium: Vicente Calderón; Referee: Medina Cantalejo |

| 17 September 2006 3 | Athletic Bilbao | 1–4 | Atlético Madrid | Bilbao |
| 20:00 (CEST) | Javi 85' | Report | Maxi Rodríguez 18'; Petrov 36'; Agüero 64'; Galletti 89' (pen.) | Stadium: San Mamés; Referee: Pérez Burrull |

| 24 September 2006 4 | Atlético Madrid | 2–1 | Sevilla | Madrid |
| 19:00 (CEST) | Maxi Rodríguez 84', 87' | Report | Renato 40' | Stadium: Vicente Calderón; Referee: González Vázquez |

| 1 October 2006 5 | Real Madrid | 1–1 | Atlético Madrid | Madrid |
| 18:00 (CEST) | Raúl 36' | Report | Mista 5' | Stadium: Santiago Bernabéu; Referee: Undiano Mallenco |

| 14 October 2006 6 | Atlético Madrid | 2–1 | Recreativo de Huelva | Madrid |
| 22:00 (CEST) | Torres 71' (pen.); Agüero 77' | Report | Guerrero 62' | Stadium: Vicente Calderón; Referee: Pérez Lima |

| 21 October 2006 7 | Deportivo de La Coruña | 1–0 | Atlético Madrid | A Coruña |
| 22:00 (CEST) | Arizmendi 65' | Report | | Stadium: Riazor; Referee: Pérez Lasa |

| 29 October 2006 8 | Atlético Madrid | 0–1 | Real Zaragoza | Madrid |
| 21:00 (CET) | | Report | Óscar 87' | Stadium: Vicente Calderón; Referee: Muñiz Fernández |

| 4 November 2006 9 | RCD Mallorca | 0–0 | Atlético Madrid | Palma de Mallorca |
| 20:00 (CET) | | Report | | Stadium: Iberostar; Referee: Delgado Ferreiro |

| 11 November 2006 10 | Atlético Madrid | 3–1 | Villarreal | Madrid |
| 20:00 (CET) | Zé Castro 36'; Torres 45' (pen.); Agüero 64' | Report | Fuentes 13' | Stadium: Vicente Calderón; Referee: Pérez Burrull |

| 19 November 2006 11 | Levante UD | 0–3 | Atlético Madrid | Valencia |
| 17:00 (CET) | | Report | Torres 33' (pen.); Maniche 68', 75' | Stadium: Ciutat de València; Referee: Clos Gómez |

| 25 November 2006 12 | Atlético Madrid | 1–1 | Real Sociedad | Madrid |
| 22:00 (CET) | Ansotegi 76' (o.g.) | Report | Gari 23' | Stadium: Vicente Calderón; Referee: Teixeira Vitienes |

| 2 December 2006 13 | Real Betis | 0–1 | Atlético Madrid | Seville |
| 22:00 (CET) | | Report | Galletti 32' | Stadium: Manuel Ruiz de Lopera; Referee: Álvarez Izquierdo |

| 10 December 2006 14 | Atlético Madrid | 1–2 | RCD Espanyol | Madrid |
| 19:00 (CET) | Torres 56' | Report | Tamudo 8'; García 61' | Stadium: Vicente Calderón; Referee: Ayza Gámez |

| 17 December 2006 15 | Atlético Madrid | 1–0 | Getafe | Madrid |
| 21:00 (CET) | Maniche 23' | Report | | Stadium: Vicente Calderón; Referee: Fernández Borbalán |

| 21 December 2006 16 | FC Barcelona | 1–1 | Atlético Madrid | Barcelona |
| 22:00 (CET) | Ronaldinho 41' | Report | Agüero 59' | Stadium: Camp Nou; Referee: Medina Cantalejo |

| 6 January 2007 17 | Atlético Madrid | 0–0 | Gimnàstic | Madrid |
| 20:00 (CET) | | Report | | Stadium: Vicente Calderón; Referee: Delgado Ferreiro |

| 14 January 2007 18 | Celta de Vigo | 1–3 | Atlético Madrid | Vigo |
| 19:00 (CET) | Nenê 70' | Report | Torres 12', 20'; Agüero 53' | Stadium: Balaídos; Referee: Turienzo Álvarez |

| 20 January 2007 19 | Atlético Madrid | 1–0 | Osasuna | Madrid |
| 20:00 (CET) | Zé Castro 82' | Report | | Stadium: Vicente Calderón; Referee: Lizondo Cortés |

| 27 January 2007 20 | Atlético Madrid | 1–1 | Racing Santander | Madrid |
| 20:00 (CET) | Pablo 75' | Report | Žigić 73' | Stadium: Vicente Calderón; Referee: Ramírez Domínguez |

| 3 February 2007 21 | Valencia | 3–1 | Atlético Madrid | Valencia |
| 22:00 (CET) | Ayala 14'; Morientes 53', 68' | Report | Mista 56' | Stadium: Mestalla; Referee: Pérez Burrull |

| 11 February 2007 22 | Atlético Madrid | 1–0 | Athletic Bilbao | Madrid |
| 21:00 (CET) | Agüero 63' | Report | | Stadium: Vicente Calderón; Referee: Clos Gómez |

| 18 February 2007 23 | Sevilla | 3–1 | Atlético Madrid | Seville |
| 21:00 (CET) | Kanouté 15', 73'; Dani Alves 21' | Report | Pablo 82' | Stadium: Sánchez Pizjuán; Referee: Teixeira Vitienes |

| 24 February 2007 24 | Atlético Madrid | 1–1 | Real Madrid | Madrid |
| 22:00 (CET) | Torres 11' | Report | Higuaín 61' | Stadium: Vicente Calderón; Referee: Daudén Ibáñez |

| 4 March 2007 25 | Recreativo Huelva | 1–0 | Atlético Madrid | Huelva |
| 21:00 (CET) | Sinama Pongolle 10' (pen.) | Report | | Stadium: Nuevo Colombino; Referee: Ayza Gámez |

| 11 March 2007 26 | Atlético Madrid | 2–0 | Deportivo de La Coruña | Madrid |
| 19:00 (CET) | Galletti 1'; Mista 84' | Report | | Stadium: Vicente Calderón; Referee: Mejuto González |

| 18 March 2007 27 | Real Zaragoza | 1–0 | Atlético Madrid | Zaragoza |
| 17:00 (CET) | Milito 19' | Report | | Stadium: La Romareda; Referee: Ramírez Domínguez |

| 1 April 2007 28 | Atlético Madrid | 1–1 | RCD Mallorca | Madrid |
| 17:00 (CEST) | Torres 15' | Report | Arango 52' | Stadium: Vicente Calderón; Referee: Pérez Lasa |

| 8 April 2007 29 | Villarreal | 0–1 | Atlético Madrid | Villarreal |
| 21:00 (CEST) | | Report | Eller 32' | Stadium: El Madrigal; Referee: Muñiz Fernández |

| 15 April 2007 30 | Atlético Madrid | 1–0 | Levante UD | Madrid |
| 17:00 (CEST) | Torres 60' | Report | | Stadium: Vicente Calderón; Referee: Teixeira Vitienes |

| 21 April 2007 31 | Real Sociedad | 2–0 | Atlético Madrid | San Sebastián |
| 20:00 (CEST) | Kovačević 7'; Sávio 84' | Report | | Stadium: Anoeta; Referee: Medina Cantalejo |

| 28 April 2007 32 | Atlético Madrid | 0–0 | Real Betis | Madrid |
| 20:00 (CEST) | | Report | | Stadium: Vicente Calderón; Referee: Rodríguez Santiago |

| 6 May 2007 33 | Espanyol | 2–1 | Atlético Madrid | Barcelona |
| 19:00 (CEST) | Moha 9'; Pandiani 74' | Report | Petrov 89' | Stadium: Olympic Stadium; Referee: Fernández Borbalán |

| 13 May 2007 34 | Getafe | 1–4 | Atlético Madrid | Getafe |
| 17:00 (CEST) | Manu 59' | Report | Torres 2', 65'; Maniche 17'; Galletti 87' (pen.) | Stadium: Coliseum Alfonso Pérez; Referee: Lizondo Cortés |

| 20 May 2007 35 | Atlético Madrid | 0–6 | FC Barcelona | Madrid |
| 21:00 (CEST) | | Report | Messi 39', 80'; Zambrotta 43'; Eto'o 44'; Ronaldinho 57'; Iniesta 88' | Stadium: Vicente Calderón; Referee: Muñiz Fernández |

| 27 May 2007 36 | Gimnàstic | 0–2 | Atlético Madrid | Tarragona |
| 19:00 (CEST) | | Report | Torres 10', 54' (pen.) | Stadium: Nou Estadi; Referee: Pérez Lasa |

| 9 June 2007 37 | Atlético Madrid | 2–3 | Celta de Vigo | Madrid |
| 21:00 (CEST) | Maxi Rodríguez 28', 70' | Report | Baiano 30' (pen.), 67'; Yago 47' | Stadium: Vicente Calderón; Referee: Pérez Burrull |

| 17 June 2007 38 | Osasuna | 1–2 | Atlético Madrid | Pamplona |
| 21:00 (CEST) | Milošević 46' | Report | Maxi Rodríguez 38'; Monreal 52' (o.g.) | Stadium: Reyno de Navarra; Referee: Medina Cantalejo |

=== Copa del Rey ===
==== Matches ====
| 24 October 2006 R32, Leg 1 | Atlético Madrid | 0–1 | Levante UD | Madrid |
| 21:00 (CET) | | Report | Nino 86' | Stadium: Vicente Calderón; Referee: Ramírez Domínguez |

| 13 December 2006 R32, Leg 2 | Levante UD | 0–1 (a.e.t.) (1–1 agg.) (2–4 p) | Atlético Madrid | Valencia |
| 21:00 (CET) | | Report; Report | Agüero 89' | Stadium: Ciutat de València; Attendance: 7,436; Referee: Mejuto González |
| | Penalties |
| | Álvaro (penalty scored); Kapó (penalty missed); Courtois (penalty scored); Zé María (penalty missed) | | (penalty scored) Luccin; (penalty scored) Pernía; (penalty missed) Torres; (penalty scored) Jurado; (penalty scored) Agüero |

| 9 January 2007 R16, Leg 1 | Atlético Madrid | 1–1 | CA Osasuna | Madrid |
| 21:00 (CET) | Torres 79' | Report | Webó 36' | Stadium: Vicente Calderón; Referee: Iturralde González |

| 17 January 2007 R16, Leg 2 | CA Osasuna | 2–0 (3–1 agg.) | Atlético Madrid | Pamplona |
| 21:00 (CET) | Puñal 16', 27' | Report | | Stadium: Reyno de Navarra; Referee: Muñiz Fernández |

== Statistics ==
=== Top scorers ===
| Rank | Position | Number | Player | La Liga | Copa del Rey | Total |
|---|---|---|---|---|---|---|
| 1 | FW | 9 | (Spain) Fernando Torres | 14 | 1 | 15 |
| 2 | FW | 10 | (Argentina) Sergio Agüero | 6 | 1 | 7 |
| 3 | MF | 11 | (Argentina) Maxi Rodríguez | 6 | 0 | 6 |
| 4 | MF | 7 | (Argentina) Luciano Galletti | 4 | 0 | 4 |
| 4 | MF | 20 | (Portugal) Maniche | 4 | 0 | 4 |
| 6 | FW | 23 | (Spain) Mista | 3 | 0 | 3 |
| 7 | DF | 14 | (Portugal) Zé Castro | 2 | 0 | 2 |
| 7 | MF | 17 | (Bulgaria) Martin Petrov | 2 | 0 | 2 |
| 7 | DF | 22 | (Spain) Pablo Ibáñez | 2 | 0 | 2 |
| 10 | DF | 12 | (Brazil) Fabiano Eller | 1 | 0 | 1 |
| Own goals | | | | 2 | 0 | 2 |
| Totals | | | | 46 | 2 | 48 |
