= Jhon Murillo (disambiguation) =

Jhon Murillo (born 1995) is a Venezuelan football forward.

Jhon Murillo may also refer to:

- Jhon Murillo (triple jumper) (born 1984), Colombian triple jumper
- Jhon Murillo (Colombian footballer) (born 1990), Colombian football midfielder

== See also ==
- John Murillo, American poet
