= Eloy Edu =

Equatoguinean football player and manager

Eloy
Personal information
- Full name: Eloy Edu Nkene
- Date of birth: 16 March 1985 (age 41)
- Place of birth: Ebibeyin, Equatorial Guinea
- Height: 1.83 m (6 ft 0 in)
- Positions: Centre-back; defensive midfielder; left-back

Youth career
- Torrepista
- AD Torrejón

Senior career*
Years	Team	Apps	(Gls)
2004–2005	Torrejón		
2005–2006	Santa Eugenia		
2006–2008	La Meca de Rivas	24	(0)
2008	San Fernando	9	(0)
2009	Colmenar de Oreja	12	(0)
2009–2010	Arganda	25	(1)
2010–2012	Internacional de Madrid	57	(4)
2012	Puerta Bonita	3	(0)
2013	Collado Villalba	11	(0)
2013	Torrejón	9	(0)
2013–2015	Villaverde	55	(12)
2015	Atlético Pinto	5	(0)
2015–2016	St. Andrews (Malta)	19	(1)
2016	Tarxien Rainbows	4	(0)
2017	Andorra CF	14	(1)
2017	Barco	0	(0)
2017	Parla Escuela	6	(0)
2017–2018	Andorra CF	12	(1)
2018–2020	Torrejón	43	(2)
2021	Daganzo	3	(0)
2021–2022	Coslada	19	(0)

International career^{‡}
2011	Equatorial Guinea U-23	2	(0)
2015	Equatorial Guinea B	1	(0)
2016	Equatorial Guinea	3	(0)
- * Club domestic league appearances and goals as of 12 June 2022 ‡ National team caps and goals as of 11 October 2016

Eloy Edu Nkene (born 16 March 1985), simply known as Eloy, is an Equatorial Guinean football player and manager who plays as a defender. He was a member of the Equatorial Guinea national team.

== International career ==
Eloy was called to play with the Equatorial Guinea national team in the Africa Cup of Nations 2008 Qualifying match against Cameroon on 7 October 2006. He was also part of the Equatoguinean team in the Mundialito de la Inmigración y la Solidaridad 2010 in Madrid, Spain.
