= CD Nuevo Puerta Bonita =

Association football club in Spain

Puerta Bonita
- Full name: Club Deportivo Nuevo Puerta Bonita de Carabanchel
- Founded: 1942; 84 years ago
- Ground: Antiguo Canódromo, Carabanchel, Madrid, Spain
- Capacity: 4,000
- Chairman: José María Hernández
- Manager: Lalo
- League: Primera de Aficionados – Group 6
- 2025–26: Segunda de Aficionados – Group 22, 1st of 15 (champions)
- Website: cdnuevopuertabonita.com
Home colours	Away colours

Club Deportivo Nuevo Puerta Bonita de Carabanchel is a Spanish football club based in Carabanchel, city of Madrid, in the namesake autonomous community. Founded in 1942 as Club Deportivo Puerta Bonita, it plays in Primera de Aficionados – Group 6, holding home games at Antiguo Canódromo de Carabanchel, which has a capacity of 4,000 spectators.

== History ==
Logo of Puerta Bonita used until 2017

Puerta Bonita was founded on 21 April 1942 under the presidency of Julio Barragán, being one of the oldest clubs in the city of Madrid. In the 1989–90 season it made its debuts in the fourth division, category to which it returned five years later, for a much longer spell (one full decade).

In the following years, Puerta Bonita fluctuated between the last division of national football and the regional leagues. The team was noted for its youth football organisation, being one of the clubs with more players in the Community of Madrid.

In 2013, Puerta Bonita promoted for the first time in its history to the third tier, but it was immediately relegated. Two years later, the club was relegated again to Preferente. On 19 September 2016, the day after not entering its game of the round 1, Puerta Bonita announced its withdrew from the competition and its dissolution.

In 2018, the club was refounded as Club Deportivo Nuevo Puerta Bonita de Carabanchel.

== Season to season ==
Season	Tier	Division	Place	Copa del Rey
1944–45	6	3ª Reg.	4th	
1945–46	6	3ª Reg.	1st	
1946–47	6	2ª Reg.	2nd	
1947–48	5	2ª Reg. P.	8th	
1948–49	5	2ª Reg. P.	(W)	
1949–1954	DNP			
1954–55	8	5ª Reg.	11th	
1955–56	8	5ª Reg.	1st	
1956–57	7	4ª Reg.	2nd	
1957–58	7	4ª Reg.	4th	
1958–59	7	4ª Reg.	3rd	
1959–60	7	4ª Reg.	5th	
1960–61	7	4ª Reg.	5th	
1961–62	6	3ª Reg.	6th	
1962–63	6	3ª Reg.	10th	
1963–64	5	2ª Reg.	10th	
1964–65	5	2ª Reg.	3rd	
1965–66	5	2ª Reg.	1st	
1966–67	4	1ª Reg.	5th	
1967–68	4	1ª Reg.	2nd	

Season	Tier	Division	Place	Copa del Rey
1968–69	4	1ª Reg.	11th	
1969–70	4	1ª Reg.	16th	
1970–71	5	2ª Reg.	5th	
1971–72	5	2ª Reg.	10th	
1972–73	5	2ª Reg.	8th	
1973–74	6	2ª Reg.	3rd	
1974–75	5	1ª Reg.	12th	
1975–76	5	1ª Reg.	19th	
1976–77	6	2ª Reg.	16th	
1977–78	7	2ª Reg.	13th	
1978–79	7	2ª Reg.	16th	
1979–80	8	3ª Reg. P.	5th	
1980–81	8	3ª Reg. P.	6th	
1981–82	8	3ª Reg. P.	3rd	
1982–83	7	2ª Reg.	4th	
1983–84	6	1ª Reg.	1st	
1984–85	5	Reg. Pref.	14th	
1985–86	5	Reg. Pref.	11th	
1986–87	5	Reg. Pref.	9th	
1987–88	5	Reg. Pref.	6th	

Season	Tier	Division	Place	Copa del Rey
1988–89	5	Reg. Pref.	7th	
1989–90	4	3ª	18th	
1990–91	5	Reg. Pref.	5th	
1991–92	5	Reg. Pref.	2nd	
1992–93	4	3ª	18th	
1993–94	5	Reg. Pref.	3rd	
1994–95	4	3ª	17th	
1995–96	4	3ª	15th	
1996–97	4	3ª	17th	
1997–98	4	3ª	17th	
1998–99	4	3ª	8th	
1999–2000	4	3ª	17th	
2000–01	4	3ª	12th	
2001–02	4	3ª	13th	
2002–03	4	3ª	14th	
2003–04	4	3ª	20th	
2004–05	5	Reg. Pref.	4th	
2005–06	5	Reg. Pref.	1st	
2006–07	4	3ª	11th	
2007–08	4	3ª	14th	

Season	Tier	Division	Place	Copa del Rey
2008–09	4	3ª	17th	
2009–10	5	Pref.	1st	
2010–11	4	3ª	12th	
2011–12	4	3ª	3rd	
2012–13	4	3ª	1st	
2013–14	3	2ª B	18th	First round
2014–15	4	3ª	14th	
2015–16	4	3ª	18th	
2016–17	5	Pref.	(W)	
2017–18	DNP			
2018–19	8	3ª Afic.	3rd	
2019–20	8	3ª Afic.	1st	
2020–21	7	2ª Afic.	4th	
2021–22	8	2ª Afic.	2nd	
2022–23	7	1ª Afic.	10th	
2023–24	7	1ª Afic.	18th	
2024–25	8	1ª Afic.	16th	
2025–26	9	2ª Afic.		

- 1 season in Segunda División B
- 20 seasons in Tercera División

== Uniform ==
- Standard kit: white shirt, white shorts and white socks.
- Alternative kit: green shirt, green shorts and gren socks.

== Stadium ==
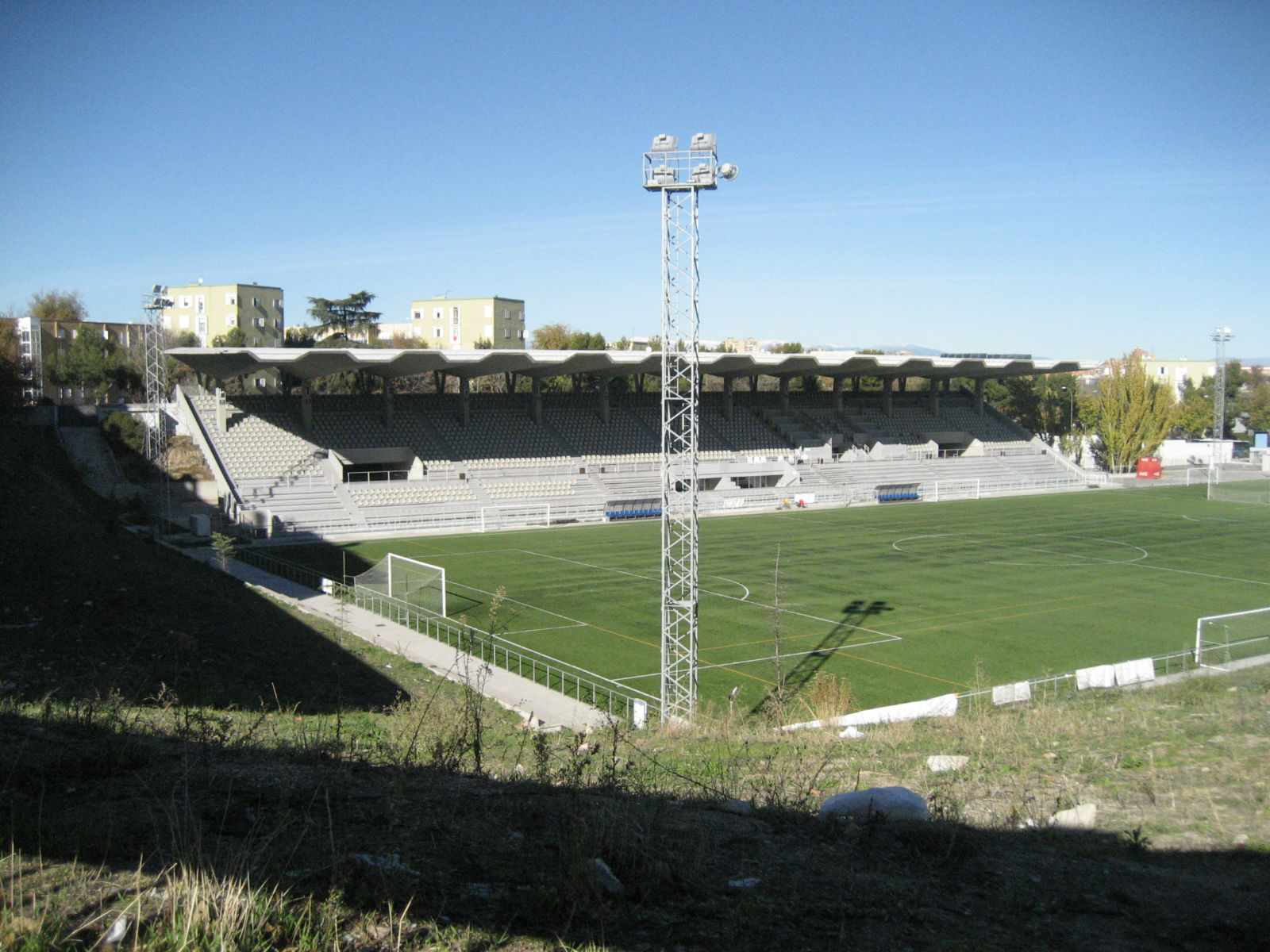
"Antiguo Canódromo" stadium

Antiguo Canódromo de Carabanchel is located on the Via Carpetana. The stadium, which was previously a greyhound racing track, was completely remodeled by the Madrid city hall, and re-opened in 2007 as a multisports area.

The ground was opened on 15 May 2007, with a match against Real Madrid Castilla. Before relocating Puerta Bonita historically played at El Hogar, with a 1,000-seat capacity and a dirt track. It belongs to the city council but is still used by the club.

== Current squad ==
As 13 January 2014 Note: Flags indicate national team as defined under FIFA eligibility rules; some limited exceptions apply. Players may hold more than one non-FIFA nationality.

No.	Pos.	Nation	Player
—	GK	ESP	Omar
—	GK	ESP	David Sierra
—	GK	ESP	Yelco Ramos
—	DF	ESP	Miguel Altares
—	DF	ESP	Iván Amaya
—	DF	ESP	Antonio Amores
—	DF	ESP	Alberto Berzal
—	DF	ESP	Carlos Alberto
—	DF	ESP	Pablo Cutillas
—	DF	ESP	Iñaki Ocaña
—	DF	ESP	Rubén Darío
—	MF	ESP	Pedro Aldea

No.	Pos.	Nation	Player
—	MF	ESP	José Álvaro Cano
—	MF	ESP	Chevi
—	MF	ESP	Fernando Domenech
—	MF	ESP	Joshua Zapata
—	MF	ESP	Nacho
—	MF	ESP	Rubén Blanco
—	MF	ESP	Yuma
—	FW	ESP	Álex García
—	FW	ESP	Kevin
—	FW	ESP	Roberto Peragón
—	FW	ESP	Rubén Ramos

== Former players ==
- (Dominican Republic) Enmy Peña
- (Equatorial Guinea) Eloy
- (Equatorial Guinea) Jhon
- (Equatorial Guinea) Óscar
- (Equatorial Guinea) (Spain) Dani Evuy
- (Equatorial Guinea) (United States) Andrés Malango

== Affiliated clubs ==
- (Spain) CD Montijo San Antolín
- (Spain) CD Oroquieta Villaverde

== Curiosity ==
The film "The World's Longest Penalty" (2004), starring Fernando Tejero, was recorded in the former stadium of Puerta Bonita, El Hogar.
