= Donato Malango =

Equatoguinean footballer (born 1977)

Personal information
- Full name: Donato Mbuamangongo Malango Dyombe
- Date of birth: 1 August 1977 (age 49)
- Place of birth: Los Angeles, California, U.S.
- Height: 1.90 m (6 ft 3 in)
- Position: Midfielder

Senior career*
Years	Team	Apps	(Gls)
1997–1998	Villaverde		

International career
2003	Equatorial Guinea	1	(0)
- * Club domestic league appearances and goals

Donato Mbuamangongo Malango Dyombe (born 1 August 1977) is an Equatoguinean former footballer who played as a midfielder. He played for the Equatorial Guinea national team.

== Early life ==
Malango was born in Los Angeles, California, United States as a result of diplomatic work of his father. He moved with his family to Mozambique for two years and returned later to Equatorial Guinea, where Malango spent his infancy. He lived in Malabo until age 12. Being a teenager, he emigrated to Madrid, Spain.

== Club career ==
Malango played for Spanish club Villaverde in the 1997–1998 season of the regional division of Madrid.

== International career ==
On 8 June 2003 Malango (along with his brother Andrés) played for Equatorial Guinea, competing in a 2–1 win against Gabon at the 2004 Africa Cup of Nations qualifiers.

== Personal life ==
Malango has two brothers, Thomas and Andrés, who were also footballers, and a sister, Rosa, who is a diplomat. They were also born in California. He now lives in Bicester, United Kingdom.

On 19 February 2004, Malango became a Spanish citizen.

== Statistics ==
=== International ===
As of 21 March 2018

Equatorial Guinea
Year	Apps	Goals
2003	1	0
Total	1	0
