= Andrés Malango =

Equatoguinean footballer (born 1974)

Personal information
- Full name: Andrés Mbuamangongo Malango Dyombe
- Date of birth: 19 December 1974 (age 51)
- Place of birth: Los Angeles, California, U.S.
- Height: 1.74 m (5 ft 9 in)
- Position: Forward

Senior career*
Years	Team	Apps	(Gls)
1993–1996	Real Aranjuez	1	(0)
- Puerta Bonita
- Villaverde-Boetticher
- Carabanchel

International career^{‡}
2003	Equatorial Guinea	1	(1)
- * Club domestic league appearances and goals ‡ National team caps and goals as of 8 June 2003

Andrés Mbuamangongo Malango Dyombe (born 19 December 1974) is an Equatorial Guinean former footballer who played as a forward. He played for the Equatorial Guinea national team.

== Early life ==
Malango was born in Los Angeles, California, United States as a result of diplomatic work of his father. He moved with his family to Mozambique for two years and returned later to Equatorial Guinea, where Malango spent his infancy. Being a teenager, he emigrated to Spain.

== Club career ==
Malango played in the Spanish Segunda División B for Real Aranjuez.

== International career ==
On 8 June 2003 Malango played for Equatorial Guinea, scoring the last in a 2–1 win against Gabon at the 2004 Africa Cup of Nations qualifiers. Later that year, he was substitute in both FIFA World Cup qualifying matches against Togo but did not appear.

=== International goals ===
#	Date	Venue	Opponent	Score	Result	Competition
1	8 June 2003	Estadio La Paz, Malabo, Equatorial Guinea	Gabon	2 )–1	2–1	2004 African Cup of Nations Qualifying match

== Personal life ==
Malango, who has studied psychology and worked in JPMorgan Chase, lives nowadays in Manhattan, New York. His brothers, Donato and Thomas, were also footballers and his sister Rosa a diplomat.

== Statistics ==
=== International ===
As of 18 January 2015

Equatorial Guinea
Year	Apps	Goals
2003	1	1
Total	1	1
