= Javier del Pino =

Spanish footballer

Personal information
- Full name: Javier del Pino González
- Date of birth: 10 July 1980 (age 46)
- Place of birth: Madrid, Spain
- Height: 1.76 m (5 ft 9 in)
- Position: Forward

Youth career
- Villaverde Boetticher
- Moscardó

Senior career*
Years	Team	Apps	(Gls)
1998–2000	Atlético Madrid C	40	(22)
1999–2002	Atlético Madrid B	43	(12)
2000–2001	→ Rayo Majadahonda (loan)	21	(15)
2002	Atlético Madrid	1	(0)
2002–2005	Xerez	73	(7)
2005–2016	Numancia	292	(48)
Total		470	(104)
- * Club domestic league appearances and goals

Javier del Pino González (born 10 July 1980) is a Spanish former professional footballer who played as a forward.

He spent the better part of his 18-year career with Numancia (11 seasons), appearing in 298 competitive matches and scoring 49 goals.

== Club career ==
Del Pino was born in Madrid. An Atlético Madrid academy graduate, he managed to appear once for the first team whilst they were in the Segunda División, playing five minutes in a 4–2 home win against Real Murcia CF on 6 April 2002.

After three seasons with Xerez CD (also in the second tier), del Pino moved to CD Numancia, where he was important in helping the club to return to the top flight in 2008 after a three-year absence. He made his La Liga debut on 31 August of that year at the age of 28 years and one month, coming on as a substitute against FC Barcelona in a 1–0 home win. The team were eventually relegated after ranking second-bottom, and he scored a career-best nine goals the following campaign – best in the squad – but the Sorians failed to regain their lost status.

On 1 June 2016, del Pino announced he would retire at the end of the season. His last appearance occurred three days later at the age of 35, a 2–0 home victory over already relegated Albacete Balompié.

== Honours ==
Numancia

- Segunda División: 2007–08
