= Pablo Ibáñez =

Spanish footballer (born 1981)

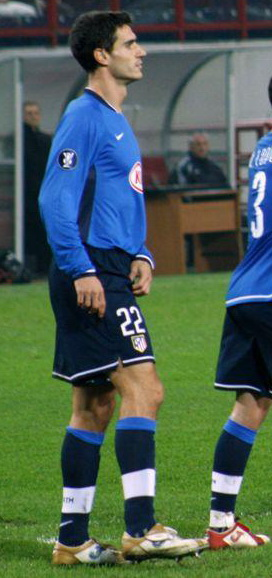
- Pablo playing for Atlético Madrid in 2007

Personal information
- Full name: Pablo Ibáñez Tébar
- Date of birth: 3 August 1981 (age 45)
- Place of birth: Madrigueras, Spain
- Height: 1.92 m (6 ft 4 in)
- Position: Centre-back

Youth career
- 1997–1999: Albacete

Senior career*
Years	Team	Apps	(Gls)
1999–2002	Albacete B		
2000–2001	→ Caravaca (loan)		
2002–2004	Albacete	75	(2)
2004–2010	Atlético Madrid	156	(9)
2010–2011	West Bromwich Albion	10	(1)
2011–2013	Birmingham City	19	(0)
Total		260	(12)

International career
2002–2003	Spain U21	10	(0)
2004–2008	Spain	23	(0)
- * Club domestic league appearances and goals

Pablo Ibáñez Tébar (born 3 August 1981), sometimes known as just Pablo, is a Spanish former professional footballer who played as a centre back.

Pablo was born in Madrigueras. He began his football career in the youth teams of his local professional club, Albacete, with whom he earned promotion from the Segunda División to La Liga in 2003. A year later, he signed for Atlético Madrid where he made nearly 200 appearances over six seasons. His career with Atlético was marred by controversy when one of the 2006 presidential candidates for their city rivals Real Madrid claimed that a deal was in place for Real to sign Pablo should he win the election. Although he re-established himself in the Atlético team, contributing to a fourth-place finish in 2008, he played increasingly rarely towards the end of his time with the club, and in 2010 he moved to England. He spent a season with Premier League club West Bromwich Albion and two with Football League Championship (second-tier) club Birmingham City.

At international level, Pablo was capped 10 times for Spain's under-21 team before making his first appearance for the senior national team in 2004. He went on to earn 23 caps and represented his country at the 2006 World Cup.

== Club career ==
=== Early life and career ===
Pablo was born in Madrigueras, in the Province of Albacete in Castile-La Mancha, the son of a member of the Policía Nacional. He grew up in Leganés, in the greater Madrid area, where his father was stationed, and played football as a midfielder or occasional forward for a team in the district of El Carrascal. His parents had connections with the Albacete club, and at the age of 14, Pablo began his football career in that club's youth teams where he was converted to play in central defence. He worked his way through the junior teams, but instead of moving up into Albacete's B team, he was sent on loan to Caravaca, who were then playing in the Tercera División (fourth tier). On returning to his owning club, he played the 2001–02 season for Albacete B, also in the Tercera. He was a regular starter, and helped the team reach the promotion play-offs but without success.

=== Albacete ===
After seeing Pablo work with the first-team squad during pre-season training, coach César Ferrando was quoted as saying he would pick Pablo and ten others for the coming campaign. He was as good as his word: Pablo made his Segunda División debut in a 1–1 draw away to Terrassa on 31 August 2002, and went on to start 38 of Albacete's 42 matches as they finished the season in third place and were promoted to La Liga. After only a few second-tier matches, he had made sufficient impact to attract interest from clubs both domestic and foreign and receive a call-up to the Spanish under-21 team for a friendly match against Bulgaria.

In the January 2003 transfer window, Albacete attempted to arrange his transfer to Celta Vigo, but the deal foundered on Albacete's need for a significant part of the fee to be paid in cash. A few weeks later, sports agent Alejandro Camaño bought half the rights to the player, thus enabling the club to pay the wages and complete the season successfully.

Although a training-ground injury put his top-flight debut in some doubt, he was deemed fit to start for Albacete on the opening day of the 2003–04 La Liga season. El País' match reporter described the "promising" Pablo as one of Albacete's mainstays, despite inadequate marking by him and defensive partner Gustavo Siviero taking much of the blame for the opening goal as Osasuna won 2–0. He missed only one league game during the season as Albacete finished 14th.

During the season it became increasingly clear that the player would be joining a bigger club. Amid reported interest from a list of clubs including Manchester City, Arsenal, Leeds United, Roma, Internazionale, reportedly willing to pay around €3 million for the player and then loan him back to Albacete for a season, and Deportivo La Coruña, who agreed terms with the club but were unable to agree with Camaño, Pablo signed a four-year contract with Atlético Madrid for a fee of €3.5m plus add-ons. He was reunited with Ferrando, who had recently been appointed coach of Atlético.

=== Atlético Madrid ===
Partnering Colombian international and fellow newcomer Luis Amaranto Perea in central defence, Pablo contributed to Atlético achieving the third best defensive record in the 2004–05 La Liga season; only Barcelona and Real Madrid conceded fewer goals. The team finished in a mid-table 11th position because they did not score enough, as illustrated by Pablo's three goals making him their third best league scorer. His performances earned him selection for the senior national team, in a friendly against England in November, and reported interest from major clubs. Both he and Perea were given a pay rise and a contract extension until 2009. In 2005–06, Pablo was a fixture for both club and country. He and Perea repeated their efforts of the previous season as Atlético finished in 10th place with the fourth best defensive record, and he partnered Carles Puyol at the 2006 World Cup.

Pablo became embroiled in the 2006 Real Madrid presidential elections. José Antonio Camacho, the chosen coach of presidential candidate Juan Palacios, announced that the club would bring in José Antonio Reyes, Joaquín and Pablo to strengthen the team if he won the election, and that the deal for Pablo was already done. Palacios lost the election, so Pablo had to remain with Atlético. His agent spoke out in his defence, confirming that Pablo had not asked to leave Atlético, and the Palacios faction were taking advantage of a contractual clause allowing him to leave if an offer of €15 million were received (the club claimed the figure was only a basis for negotiation). He also disingenuously suggested that joining the hated rival was no different from joining a big club abroad. Atlético coach Javier Aguirre made it clear they still wanted and needed "the best centre-back in Spain", and the player apologised to the fans, insisting he wanted to stay at Atlético and admitting he had made a mistake in accepting Real's offer.

He kept his place, but in November, an injury sustained against Mallorca was diagnosed as a bruised kidney and fractured vertebrae, which kept him out for some weeks, during which time Zé Castro forced his way into consideration as a starter. In January 2007, Pablo marked his 100th game for the club with a rare goal to earn a draw with Racing Santander, and completed the season with 24 league games. He helped the club qualify for the 2007–08 UEFA Cup via the Intertoto Cup, and retained a regular spot in the starting eleven as Atlético finished fourth in the league and qualified for the Champions League, but mistakes in the Madrid derby in January 2008 led to both Real's goals and rekindled the fans' hostility.

Although the recruitment of Tomáš Ujfaluši and Johnny Heitinga pushed Pablo down the pecking order, he finished the 2008–09 season with 21 league appearances. An offer from Real Zaragoza of less than €5m was rejected by the club as insufficient, but despite the arrival of Juanito adding to the defensive competition, Pablo said he was happy to see out the remaining year of his contract. In that final season, he played rarely. He took part in the early rounds of the Copa del Rey and in the group stage of the Champions League as Atlético finished third in their group and dropped into the Europa League, but made his last appearance for the club, as a late substitute, on 20 December 2009.

=== West Bromwich Albion ===
Despite renewed interest from Camacho, then coach of Osasuna, Pablo moved to England, where he signed a three-year deal with West Bromwich Albion, newly returned to the Premier League, to begin on 1 July 2010 when his contract with Atlético expired. He made his debut on the opening day of the season, partnering Gabriel Tamaș in central defence as Albion lost 6–0 at Chelsea, and scored his first goal ten days later, in a 2–0 win at League One (third-tier) club Leyton Orient in the League Cup. He was used sporadically, making only ten Premier League appearances, of which just two came in 2011. Teammate Jonas Olsson suggested that it took at least a season to accustom oneself to English football, especially for someone who spoke little English when he first arrived.

=== Birmingham City ===
Pablo signed a two-year contract with Championship (second-tier) club Birmingham City in August 2011, at the end of the summer transfer window. The fee was undisclosed. He made his debut for the club in a 3–1 home defeat to Braga in the group stage of the Europa League. Away to Club Brugge in the same competition, he was knocked unconscious in a clash of heads with Joseph Akpala for which he received lengthy treatment; in the tenth minute of the resultant stoppage time, Chris Wood scored a winning goal for Birmingham. Pablo had replaced the injured Curtis Davies in the starting eleven, but the concussion sustained at Brugge gave Davies time to regain fitness and his undisputed starting place alongside Steven Caldwell in central defence. After Caldwell's season ended early through injury, Pablo returned to the team for the last few games, including the play-off semi-final defeat, and finished the 62-game season with 17 starts, of which only 7 came in the league.

Davies and Caldwell began the 2012–13 season as first choice until an ankle injury sustained by Davies during a League Cup match at Coventry City gave Pablo an early opportunity to impress. He kept his place after Davies returned to fitness, but chipped a bone in his foot in the defeat to Barnsley and was expected to be out for a month. Further injuries, the return to fitness of Caldwell, and the emergence of young left-back Mitch Hancox, which allowed Paul Robinson to partner Davies in the centre, meant that Pablo played only twice more, and he was released at the end of his contract.

== International career ==
After only a few Segunda División matches, Pablo received his first call-up to the Spanish under-21 team, for a friendly match against Bulgaria on 19 November 2002. Despite the media's assumption that he would be among the substitutes, he played the whole match as Spain won 7–1. He was a regular selection over the next 12 months, and finished his under-21 career with ten caps. His last appearances came as Spain were eliminated by Sweden in the qualification play-offs for the 2004 European Under-21 Championships.

His first call-up to the senior national squad came in October 2004, for World Cup qualifiers against Belgium and Lithuania, as a replacement for Juanito who dropped out of the original selection because of injury. Carlos Marchena and Carles Puyol were the centre-back pairing in possession, and Pablo remained on the bench for both games. He made his international debut on 17 November 2004 in a friendly against England in Madrid. He entered the game as a half-time substitute for Marchena, with Spain leading 1–0; with 20 minutes left, he appeared to foul Alan Smith in the act of shooting, but no penalty was awarded – he told Mundo Atleti that Smith had thrown himself to the floor once he realised he could not reach the ball – and Spain had no difficulty retaining their lead. Pablo replaced Iván Helguera, who had previously been a regular selection, in the squad for Spain's next match, a World Cup qualifier at home to San Marino in February 2005, but did not play.

In his next match, a friendly against China in March, he appeared to score with a first-half header but the "goal" was ruled out because Fernando Torres was offside. A few days later, he made his first competitive international appearance in the goalless World Cup qualifier away to Serbia & Montenegro, playing alongside Puyol in the first half and Juanito in the second.

During the World Cup qualification process, Pablo established himself alongside Puyol as first choice for Spain. Despite his own goal in the last warmup game, against Croatia, he and Puyol played in the first two group games at the finals, two victories which ensured qualification for the quarter-finals, and were rested for the third, against Saudi Arabia. Against France in the last eight, Spain took the lead via David Villa's penalty after Pablo was the victim of Lilian Thuram's "clumsy challenge from behind". France equalised in the first half, then took the lead with only a few minutes left; with Spain pushing for an equaliser, Zinedine Zidane scored a stoppage-time third. It was the first time that Pablo had played in a losing Spain eleven.

He retained his place for the remainder of 2006, but thereafter played less frequently, appearing in only four of Spain's twelve Euro 2008 qualifiers. Named in the 31-man provisional squad for the competition finals, he failed to make the cut. His last international appearance came as a substitute in a 1–0 friendly win against France in February 2008.

== Style of play ==
At 1.92 m (6 ft 4 in), Pablo is tall; he is good in the air, and as a younger player was noted for his pace. Albacete teammate Miquel Buades suggested that those key attributes made him "the worst thing that could happen to a forward". His coach at both Albacete and Atlético, César Ferrando, said he had all the qualities needed for his position, which included anticipation and the intelligence to keep things simple. Again according to Ferrando, Pablo rarely fouled, because "he doesn't need to. He has a whole arsenal of defensive resources." A 2006 World Cup profile suggested he was "much happier on the ball than first impressions may suggest", and could look "ungainly". A scout's assessment of his running style as "ugly" reportedly discouraged Real Madrid from pursuing an early interest in him.

In later years, he used his experience: in 2012, the Birmingham Mail suggested that, in contrast to the "more aggressive and animated" Steven Caldwell, "Pablo tends to be subtle in his positioning and tackling, he likes to read the game rather than go head-to-head in a gladiatorial battle".

== Personal life ==
Pablo married Maika in Albacete Cathedral in 2007. As of December 2010, the couple had one son, Adrián, and one daughter, Paula.

In 2008, the Provincial Government of Albacete presented Pablo, Santi Denia, and Andrés Iniesta with the Medalla de Oro de Honor y Gratitud (Gold Medal of Honour and Gratitude), not only for their footballing prowess, as the only three natives of the province to play for the senior national team, but also in recognition of personal qualities that made them an example for the youth of the region.

== Career statistics ==
=== Club ===
Appearances and goals by club, season and competition
Club	Season	League			National cup		League cup		Other		Total	
Club	Season	Division	Apps	Goals	Apps	Goals	Apps	Goals	Apps	Goals	Apps	Goals
Albacete	2002–03	Segunda División	38	1	1	0	—		—		39	1
Albacete	2003–04	La Liga	37	1	0	0	—		—		37	1
Albacete	Total		75	2	1	0	0	0	0	0	76	2
Atlético Madrid	2004–05	La Liga	35	3	8	1	—		5 (Note: Appearances in UEFA Intertoto Cup)	0	48	4
Atlético Madrid	2005–06	La Liga	35	2	3	0	—		—		38	2
Atlético Madrid	2006–07	La Liga	24	2	2	0	—		—		26	2
Atlético Madrid	2007–08	La Liga	34	1	3	0	—		9 (Note: One appearance in Intertoto Cup, eight in UEFA Cup)	0	46	1
Atlético Madrid	2008–09	La Liga	21	1	3	0	—		4 (Note: Appearances in UEFA Champions League)	0	28	1
Atlético Madrid	2009–10	La Liga	7	0	2	0	—		3	0	12	0
Atlético Madrid	Total		156	9	21	1	0	0	21	0	198	10
West Bromwich Albion	2010–11	Premier League	10	1	0	0	4	1	—		14	2
West Bromwich Albion	2011–12	Premier League	0	0	0	0	0	0	—		0	0
West Bromwich Albion	Total		10	1	0	0	4	1	0	0	14	2
Birmingham City	2011–12	Championship	13	0	2	0	1	0	7 (Note: Five appearances in UEFA Europa League, two in Football League Championship play-offs)	0	23	0
Birmingham City	2012–13	Championship	6	0	0	0	1	0	—		7	0
Birmingham City	Total		19	0	2	0	2	0	7	0	30	0
Career total			260	12	24	1	6	1	28	0	318	14

=== International ===
Appearances and goals by national team and year
National team	Year	Apps	Goals
Spain	2004	1	0
Spain	2005	6	0
Spain	2006	11	0
Spain	2007	4	0
Spain	2008	1	0
Total		23	0

== Honours ==
Albacete

- Segunda División promotion: 2002–03

Atlético Madrid

- UEFA Intertoto Cup: 2007
- UEFA Europa League: 2009–10
- Copa del Rey runner-up: 2009–10
