= Melissa Mbile Sánchez =

Equatoguinean businesswoman (born 1994)

Melissa Mbile Sánchez Nâwara
- Born: c. 1994 (age 31–32); Malabo, Equatorial Guinea
- Education: Undisclosed university (Bachelor of Arts in Economics)
- Occupations: Businesswoman; corporate executive; entrepreneur
- Years active: since 2018
- Known for: Professional competence
- Title: Founder and CEO of La Capacidad

Melissa Mbile Sánchez Nâwara (born c. 1994) is an Equatorial Guinean businesswoman, entrepreneur and corporate executive who is the chief executive officer of La Capacidad, a clothing line that she founded and owns. Her business also mentors young people to acquire a work ethic, develop customer relationship skills and learn prompt service delivery in addition to gaining self-confidence.

== Background and education ==
Melissa was born in Malabo, the capital city of Equatorial Guinea, circa 1994. After attending schools locally, she was admitted to university, graduating with a bachelor's degree in economics at the age of 23. She has ambitions to complete a master's degree in digital marketing.

== Career ==
Melissa has private sector experience where she has overseen, analyzed and supervised development projects. In 2018, she began to design "Afro-contemporary costumes" that were displayed and marketed with her company's logo. When describing herself, she says: "I am a fashion designer, dancer, choreographer, singer and actress".

== Other considerations ==
As of September 2021, 12 young people (referred to as "interns") have transitioned through La Capacidad. The company itself maintains five full-time employees.

Melissa has two other ambitions; one is to turn her company into a fashion house. The other is to build a "School of Arts" in Equatorial Guinea. She is fluent in French, English and Spanish.

== See also ==
- Rosa Malango
