= Rosa Malango =

Equatoguinean diplomat (born 1969)

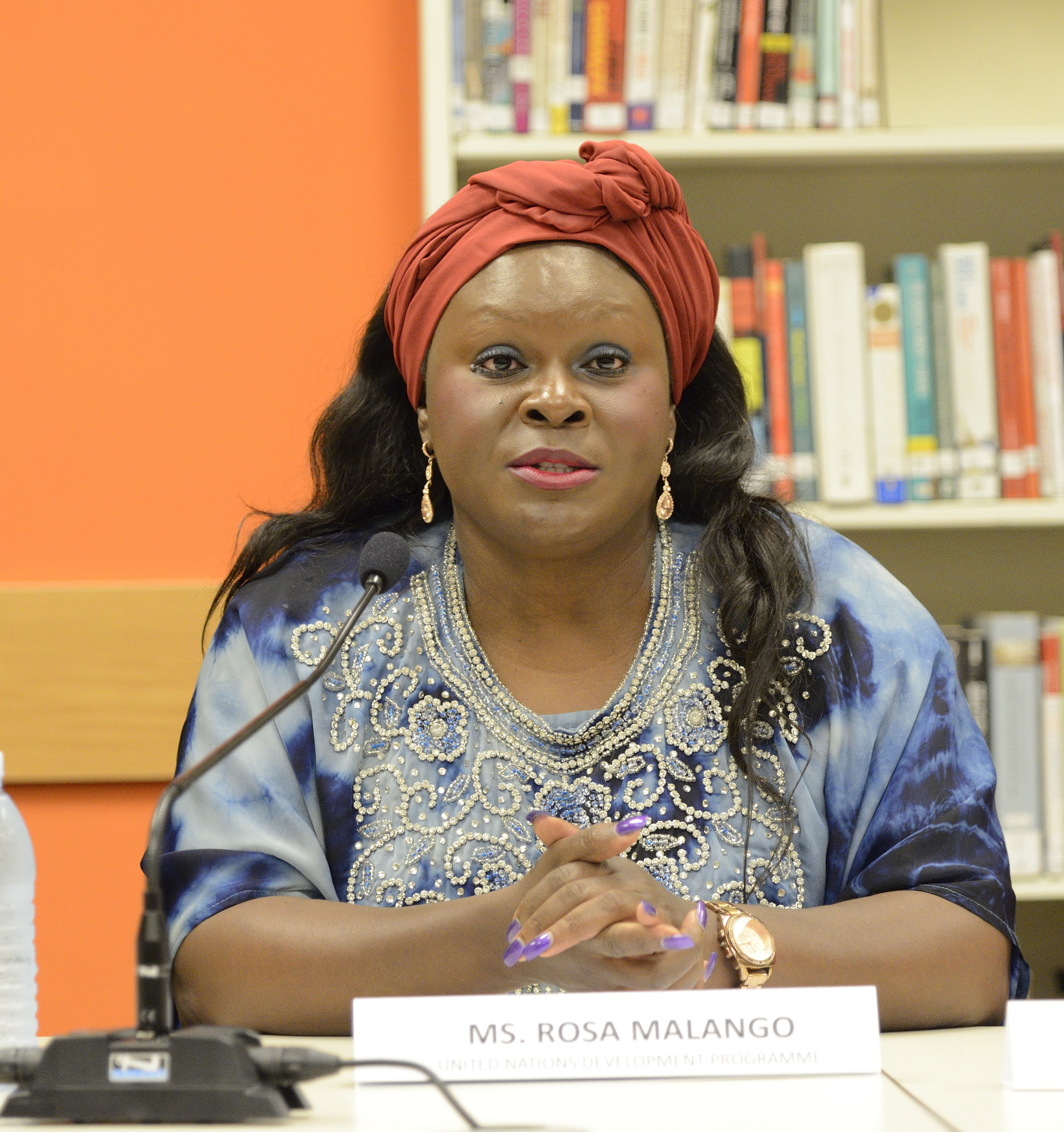
- Malango in 2018
- Born: Rosa Mbuamangongo Malango Dyombe; 2 June 1969 (age 57); Bata, Equatorial Guinea
- Citizenship: Equatorial Guinea
- Education: University of Lagos (Bachelor of Science in Mass communication)
- Occupation: Diplomat
- Years active: 1993 — present
- Known for: Diplomacy, Advocacy
- Title: Director, UN Regional Commissions, New York Office.

Rosa Mbuamangongo Malango Dyombe (born 2 June 1969) is an Equatoguinean diplomat, former sprinter and former journalist, who serves as United Nations Director, Regional Commissions, New York Office. In this capacity, she works with UN Regional Economic Commissions in Africa, the Americas, Asia and Europe. She was appointed to that position, in June 2021, by António Guterres, the UN Secretary General.

Immediately before that, from March 2016 until June 2021, she was the United Nations Resident Coordinator in Uganda, based in Kampala, the country's capital and largest city.

As a sprinter, she competed in the women's 200 metres at the 1988 Summer Olympics.

== Background and education ==
She is a native of Equatorial Guinea. Her father was a diplomat, part of the first mission of Equatorial Guinea to the UN, when that country was admitted to the United Nations starting in 1968.

Malango holds a Bachelor of Science degree in Mass Communication, awarded by the University of Lagos in Nigeria. She is reported to speak French, Spanish, English and Portuguese.

== Career ==
Following her graduation from university in the early 1990s, she took up employment with the Embassy of Argentina to Nigeria as an executive assistant and translator for the first secretary at that institution. Later, she worked with STB & Associates Limited, in their advertising department.

She then left Nigeria and went to Angola in 1994, to volunteer with the United Nations Children's Fund (UNICEF), in their social and humanitarian programs in "war-torn Angola" at that time. The following year, she was hired by the United Nations Office for the Coordination of Humanitarian Affairs (OCHA), as their chief information officer, in Angola. She served in that capacity for three years.

From 2002 until 2003, she was the regional programme coordinator for OCHA in the Ivory Coast. She stayed in the Ivory Coast for another two years, working as the Regional Programme Adviser for the World Food Programme.

Then, there followed a ten-year period between 2005 and 2015, when Malango was based in New York City, serving as the chief of the External Relations and Partnerships Section of OCHA. In 2015, she was on the move again, taking up assignment as head, Resident Coordinator's Office, for the United Nations Development Program (UNDP) in Guatemala, Central America, serving there until 2016.

In 2016 she was moved to Uganda as the UN resident coordinator, serving a five-year term in that capacity. In 2021, she relocated back to New York City to work as director of regional commissions in the New York Office. In Uganda, she was replaced by Susan Ngongi Namondo from Cameroon.

== Personal life ==
Malango's brothers Andrés and Donato played for the Equatorial Guinea national football team.

== See also ==
- Susan Ngongi Namondo
- Melissa Mbile Sánchez
