= CU Collado Villalba =

Collado Villalba
- Full name: Club Unión Collado Villalba
- Founded: 1960; As CD Villalba
- Dissolved: 19 June 2025; 16 months ago
- Ground: Ciudad Deportiva, Collado Villalba, Madrid, Spain
- Capacity: 1,000
- President: Piero Capponi
- Head coach: Nano Rivas
- 2024–25: Tercera Federación – Group 7, 7th of 18
- Website: cucvillalba.es
Home colours	Away colours

Club Unión Collado Villalba was a Spanish football club based in Collado Villalba, in the autonomous community of Madrid. Founded in 1960, it was dissolved in 2025, and held home games at Ciudad Deportiva de Collado Villalba, which has a capacity of 1,000 spectators.

== History ==
Club Deportivo Villalba was founded in 1960. In 1975, they merge with another club of the city to form Unión Deportiva Collado Villalba, renamed in 1992 as Club Unión Collado Villalba. On 30 May 2023, the club became the reserve team of CF Rayo Majadahonda, replacing CD Paracuellos Antamira.

On 1 July 2024, Collado Villalba became the second reserve team of Atlético Madrid after a ten-year agreement was reached; for the 2025–26 season onwards, the club will be fully incorporated into Atleti's structure and will be replaced by Atlético Madrid C. On 19 June 2025, the club was officially absorbed by Atleti; their Tercera Federación spot went on to Atlético C, while their youth sides remained under the name of Club Atlético Villalba.

== Season to season ==
=== CD Villalba ===
Season	Tier	Division	Place	Copa del Rey
1972–73	7	3ª Reg.	5th	
1973–74	7	3ª Reg. P.	7th	
1974–75	7	3ª Reg. P.	1st	

=== CD Collado Villalba ===
Season	Tier	Division	Place	Copa del Rey
1972–73	7	3ª Reg.	13th	
1973–74	8	3ª Reg.	10th	
1974–75	8	3ª Reg.	11th	

=== UD Collado Villalba / CU Collado Villalba ===
Season	Tier	Division	Place	Copa del Rey
1975–76	6	2ª Reg.	18th	
1976–77	6	2ª Reg.	11th	
1977–78	7	2ª Reg.	3rd	
1978–79	7	2ª Reg.	9th	
1979–80	7	2ª Reg.	1st	
1980–81	6	1ª Reg.	4th	
1981–82	6	1ª Reg.	16th	
1982–83	6	1ª Reg.	13th	
1983–84	6	1ª Reg.	3rd	
1984–85	6	1ª Reg.	6th	
1985–86	6	1ª Reg.	18th	
1986–87	6	1ª Reg.	2nd	
1987–88	5	Reg. Pref.	9th	
1988–89	5	Reg. Pref.	17th	
1989–90	6	1ª Reg.	1st	
1990–91	5	Reg. Pref.	15th	
1991–92	6	1ª Reg.	1st	
1992–93	5	Reg. Pref.	11th	
1993–94	5	Reg. Pref.	8th	
1994–95	5	Reg. Pref.	4th	

Season	Tier	Division	Place	Copa del Rey
1995–96	5	Reg. Pref.	2nd	
1996–97	4	3ª	20th	
1997–98	5	Reg. Pref.	11th	
1998–99	5	Reg. Pref.	3rd	
1999–2000	5	Reg. Pref.	10th	
2000–01	5	Reg. Pref.	14th	
2001–02	5	Reg. Pref.	11th	
2002–03	5	Reg. Pref.	10th	
2003–04	5	Reg. Pref.	9th	
2004–05	5	Reg. Pref.	1st	
2005–06	4	3ª	15th	
2006–07	4	3ª	12th	
2007–08	4	3ª	15th	
2008–09	4	3ª	21st	
2009–10	5	Pref.	12th	
2010–11	5	Pref.	6th	
2011–12	5	Pref.	1st	
2012–13	4	3ª	2nd	
2013–14	4	3ª	17th	
2014–15	5	Pref.	2nd	

Season	Tier	Division	Place	Copa del Rey
2015–16	4	3ª	20th	
2016–17	5	Pref.	11th	
2017–18	5	Pref.	8th	
2018–19	5	Pref.	17th	
2019–20	6	1ª Afic.	1st	
2020–21	5	Pref.	11th	
2021–22	6	Pref.	2nd	
2022–23	5	3ª Fed.	12th	
2023–24	5	3ª Fed.	14th	N/A (Note: Reserve team of Rayo Majadahonda.)
2024–25	5	3ª Fed.	7th	N/A (Note: Second reserve team of Atlético Madrid.)

- 7 seasons in Tercera División
- 3 seasons in Tercera Federación

== Uniforms ==
- First kit: Yellow shirt, shorts and socks.
- Alternative kit: Blue shirt, shorts and socks.

== Former players ==
- (Argentina) Martín Prest
- (Equatorial Guinea) Eloy
- (Venezuela) Dani Hernández
