= Ricardo (footballer, born 1971) =

Spanish footballer and manager

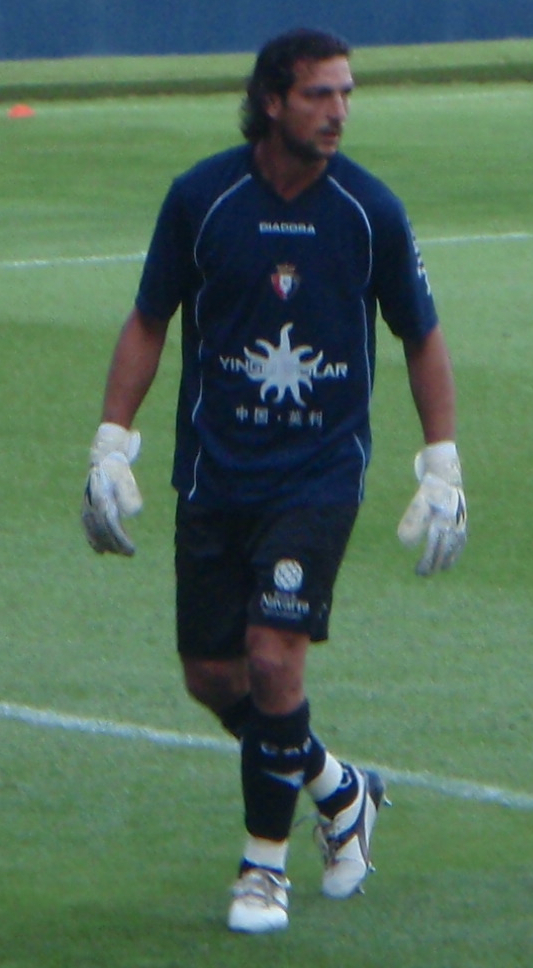
- Ricardo playing for Osasuna in 2008

Personal information
- Full name: Ricardo López Felipe
- Date of birth: 30 December 1971 (age 54)
- Place of birth: Madrid, Spain
- Height: 1.87 m (6 ft 1 1/2 in)
- Position: Goalkeeper

Youth career
- Atlético Madrid

Senior career*
Years	Team	Apps	(Gls)
1990–1998	Atlético Madrid B	146	(0)
1991–1992	→ Ávila (loan)	15	(0)
1994–1997	Atlético Madrid	1	(0)
1998–2002	Valladolid	53	(0)
2002–2005	Manchester United	1	(0)
2003–2004	→ Racing Santander (loan)	34	(0)
2005–2012	Osasuna	189	(0)
2013	Osasuna	1	(0)
Total		440	(0)

International career
1989	Spain U18	2	(0)
2001–2002	Spain	2	(0)

Managerial career
- 2018: Racing Ferrol
- 2021–2022: Ejea
- * Club domestic league appearances and goals

Ricardo López Felipe (born 30 December 1971), known simply as Ricardo, is a Spanish former professional footballer who played as a goalkeeper.

He played 279 La Liga matches over 15 seasons, starting his career at Atlético Madrid where he struggled to break through, then representing mostly Valladolid (four seasons) and Osasuna (eight). He also spent two years with Manchester United in the Premier League.

Ricardo won two international caps for Spain, and was part of the squad for the 2002 World Cup. After retiring, he worked as a manager and a goalkeeper coach.

== Club career ==
=== Atlético and Valladolid ===
Born in Madrid, Ricardo began his professional career at Atlético Madrid, working his way through the reserves and going on to represent the senior squad until 1998. Barred by José Francisco Molina, he only managed one first-team appearance which came during the 1996–97 season, in a 3–2 away win against Real Zaragoza on 2 June 1997.

Subsequently, Ricardo was transferred to Real Valladolid, also in La Liga. He spent four years at the club, becoming first-choice in the 2001–02 campaign (all 38 matches played) while also being selected as a member of the Spanish squad for the 2002 World Cup, though he did not play in the finals.

=== Manchester United ===
On 30 August 2002, Ricardo joined English club Manchester United in a three-year deal worth £1.5 million. Signed to provide cover for the injured Fabien Barthez and the inexperienced Roy Carroll, he found first-team opportunities rare, appearing in four UEFA Champions League matches and just once in the Premier League. He marked his only appearance in the latter competition, against Blackburn Rovers on 19 April 2003, by conceding a penalty with his first touch after he fouled Andy Cole, but saved David Dunn's attempt in an eventual 3–1 victory.

On 23 August 2003, Ricardo agreed to a loan transfer to Racing de Santander for 2003–04 season – the deal included an option to make transfer permanent the following June. On his return to Spain, Ricardo was quoted in the Spanish sports daily AS as saying:

"It's not a backward step. When I received the offer I was delighted to have the chance to return to Spain. I missed the Spanish league ... All I feel is gratitude toward Manchester. The club treated me very well. It was a lovely experience which was well worth it."

After helping Racing narrowly avoid top-flight relegation, Ricardo returned to Manchester United and proclaimed his ambition to take the number one jersey from Barthez. However, he was never again picked for the first team following the arrival of Tim Howard and Carroll's improvement.

=== Osasuna ===
Ricardo was eventually released by the club on a free transfer, at the end of 2004–05. Subsequently, he signed for CA Osasuna on a two-year deal, quickly becoming the Navarrese side's first-choice and totalling over 100 league appearances in his first three seasons; he also helped them reach the semi-finals of the UEFA Cup in his second year by contributing 12 matches, but lost his job midway through 2008–09 to newly signed Roberto.

Ricardo regained his first-choice status in the following top-division campaigns, rarely missing a game for Osasuna even though he was approaching his 40s. In the 2011–12 season, however, still under manager José Luis Mendilibar, he was demoted to as low as third-string.

Ricardo came out of retirement in January 2013 to rejoin Osasuna as an emergency signing, after backup goalkeeper Asier Riesgo suffered a foot injury. At 41, he was the second-oldest player in the history of the Spanish top flight, surpassed only by 48-year-old Harry Lowe of Real Sociedad in 1935. His only game of this spell was a 15-minute cameo in the final fixture, a 4–2 loss at Real Madrid in which he conceded the last goal.

Ricardo quit the game for good at the end of the campaign, stating "I don't quit football, football quits me".

=== Coaching ===
Recommended by head coach Juan Carlos Garrido, Ricardo joined Belgium's Club Brugge KV in June 2013 as a goalkeeping coach. Near the end of October, a player licence was sought out for him as both the second and third goalkeeper were unavailable due to injury; over three years and starting in July 2014, he worked in the same capacity with the Japan national team and Arsenal's academy in that Asian country.

On 2 January 2018, Ricardo was appointed head coach of Segunda División B side Racing de Ferrol. On 13 June 2019, he was named manager of former club Valladolid's under-19s.

Ricardo became manager of SD Ejea in the newly formed Segunda División RFEF on 21 October 2021. After ten matches and only one win, he was dismissed.

== International career ==
Ricardo played twice for Spain, his debut coming on 14 November 2001 in a friendly with Mexico. In a testimonial match for Ferenc Puskás the following summer, during a 1–1 draw against Hungary in Budapest, he received his second and final cap; in both cases, he came on as a substitute for Iker Casillas.

Ricardo was selected for the 2002 FIFA World Cup in Japan and South Korea.

== Career statistics ==
=== Club ===
Appearances and goals by club, season and competition
Club	Season	League			Cup		League cup		Europe		Other		Total	
Club	Season	Division	Apps	Goals	Apps	Goals	Apps	Goals	Apps	Goals	Apps	Goals	Apps	Goals
Atlético Madrid B	1990–91	Segunda División B	11	0	—		—		—		—		11	0
Atlético Madrid B	1992–93	Segunda División B	36	0	—		—		—		—		36	0
Atlético Madrid B	1993–94	Segunda División B	35	0	—		—		—		—		12	0
Atlético Madrid B	1994–95	Segunda División B	29	0	—		—		—		—		38	0
Atlético Madrid B	1997–98	Segunda División	35	0	—		—		—		—		35	0
Atlético Madrid B	Total		146	0	—		—		—		—		146	0
Ávila (loan)	1991–92	Segunda División B	15	0	5	0	—		—		—		20	0
Atlético Madrid	1994–95	La Liga	0	0	0	0	—		—		—		0	0
Atlético Madrid	1995–96	La Liga	0	0	0	0	—		—		—		0	0
Atlético Madrid	1996–97	La Liga	1	0	0	0	—		0	0	0	0	1	0
Atlético Madrid	Total		1	0	0	0	—		0	0	0	0	1	0
Valladolid	1998–99	La Liga	0	0	0	0	—		—		—		0	0
Valladolid	1999–2000	La Liga	3	0	2	0	—		—		—		5	0
Valladolid	2000–01	La Liga	12	0	0	0	—		—		—		12	0
Valladolid	2001–02	La Liga	38	0	0	0	—		—		—		38	0
Valladolid	Total		53	0	2	0	—		—		—		55	0
Manchester United	2002–03	Premier League	1	0	0	0	0	0	4	0	—		5	0
Manchester United	2004–05	Premier League	0	0	0	0	0	0	0	0	0	0	0	0
Manchester United	Total		1	0	0	0	0	0	4	0	0	0	5	0
Racing Santander (loan)	2003–04	La Liga	34	0	0	0	—		0	0	—		34	0
Osasuna	2005–06	La Liga	30	0	0	0	—		2	0	—		32	0
Osasuna	2006–07	La Liga	36	0	3	0	—		14	0	—		53	0
Osasuna	2007–08	La Liga	37	0	0	0	—		—		—		37	0
Osasuna	2008–09	La Liga	12	0	3	0	—		—		—		15	0
Osasuna	2009–10	La Liga	36	0	0	0	—		—		—		36	0
Osasuna	2010–11	La Liga	38	0	0	0	—		—		—		38	0
Osasuna	2011–12	La Liga	0	0	0	0	—		—		—		0	0
Osasuna	2012–13	La Liga	1	0	0	0	—		—		—		1	0
Osasuna	Total		190	0	6	0	—		16	0	—		212	0
Career total			440	0	13	0	0	0	18	0	0	0	471	0

=== International ===
Appearances and goals by national team and year
National team	Year	Apps	Goals
Spain	2001	1	0
Spain	2002	1	0
Total		2	0

== Honours ==
Atlético Madrid

- Copa del Rey: 1995–96
