= Villaverde San Andrés =

Association football club in Spain

Villaverde
- Full name: S.A.D. Villaverde San Andrés
- Founded: 1948 (as Boetticher CF); 1988 (merger)
- Ground: Boetticher, Villaverde; Madrid, Spain
- Capacity: 5,000
- Chairman: Juan Antonio Cózar
- Manager: Jose Maria Ramos Caro
- League: Tercera Federación – Group 7
- 2024–25: Tercera Federación – Group 7, 4th of 18
Home colours	Away colours

S.A.D. Villaverde San Andrés, formerly Sociedad Recreativa Villaverde Boetticher Club de Fútbol, is a Spanish professional football club based in the District of Villaverde in the city of Madrid, Community of Madrid. They play in Tercera Federación – Group 7.

== History ==
Club logo until 2017

The S.R. Villaverde Boetticher C.F. was founded in 1988 when S.R. Villaverde C.F. merged with SR Boetticher y Navarro, a club founded by the Company Boetticher.

In 2017, it was renamed S.A.D. Villaverde San Andrés.

In May 2019 Jose Maria Ramos Caro was appointed manager of the club.

== Season to season ==
=== Boetticher (1948–1988) ===
Season	Tier	Division	Place	Copa del Rey
1948–49	6	2ª Reg.	1st	
1949–50	5	2ª Reg. P.	2nd	
1950–51	4	1ª Reg.	3rd	
1951–52	4	1ª Reg.	2nd	
1952–53	4	1ª Reg.	3rd	
1953–54	4	1ª Reg.	3rd	
1954–55	4	1ª Reg.	2nd	
1955–56	4	1ª Reg.	6th	
1956–57	4	1ª Reg.	6th	
1957–58	4	1ª Reg.	3rd	
1958–59	4	1ª Reg.	5th	
1959–60	4	1ª Reg.	2nd	
1960–61	3	3ª	12th	
1961–62	3	3ª	16th	
1962–63	4	1ª Reg.	9th	
1963–64	4	1ª Reg.	2nd	
1964–65	3	3ª	11th	
1965–66	3	3ª	8th	
1966–67	3	3ª	14th	
1967–68	3	3ª	7th	

Season	Tier	Division	Place	Copa del Rey
1968–69	3	3ª	9th	
1969–70	3	3ª	12th	
1970–71	4	1ª Reg.	1st	
1971–72	3	3ª	17th	
1972–73	4	1ª Reg.	13th	
1973–74	5	1ª Reg.	4th	
1974–75	4	Reg. Pref.	11th	
1975–76	5	1ª Reg.	3rd	
1976–77	4	Reg. Pref.	15th	
1977–78	5	Reg. Pref.	11th	
1978–79	5	Reg. Pref.	15th	
1979–80	6	1ª Reg.	6th	
1980–81	6	1ª Reg.	6th	
1981–82	6	1ª Reg.	12th	
1982–83	6	1ª Reg.	4th	
1983–84	5	Reg. Pref.	6th	
1984–85	5	Reg. Pref.	12th	
1985–86	5	Reg. Pref.	9th	
1986–87	5	Reg. Pref.	17th	
1987–88	6	1ª Reg.	16th	

- 9 seasons in Tercera División

=== Villaverde (1971–1988) ===
Season	Tier	Division	Place	Copa del Rey
1971–72	7	3ª Reg.	1st	
1972–73	6	3ª Reg. P.	1st	
1973–74	6	2ª Reg.	9th	
1974–75	6	2ª Reg.	4th	
1975–76	6	2ª Reg.	1st	
1976–77	5	1ª Reg.	10th	
1977–78	6	1ª Reg.	8th	
1978–79	6	1ª Reg.	4th	
1979–80	6	1ª Reg.	1st	

Season	Tier	Division	Place	Copa del Rey
1980–81	5	Reg. Pref.	4th	
1981–82	5	Reg. Pref.	4th	
1982–83	5	Reg. Pref.	15th	
1983–84	5	Reg. Pref.	3rd	
1984–85	5	Reg. Pref.	17th	
1985–86	6	1ª Reg.	5th	
1986–87	5	Reg. Pref.	13th	
1987–88	5	Reg. Pref.	2nd	

=== Villaverde Boetticher ===
Season	Tier	Division	Place	Copa del Rey
1988–89	5	Reg. Pref.	1st	
1989–90	4	3ª	20th	
1990–91	5	Reg. Pref.	1st	
1991–92	4	3ª	6th	
1992–93	4	3ª	12th	First round
1993–94	4	3ª	19th	
1994–95	4	3ª	10th	
1995–96	4	3ª	6th	
1996–97	4	3ª	21st	
1997–98	5	Reg. Pref.	5th	
1998–99	5	Reg. Pref.	14th	
1999–2000	6	1ª Reg.	1st	
2000–01	5	Reg. Pref.	4th	
2001–02	5	Reg. Pref.	5th	
2002–03	5	Reg. Pref.	6th	

Season	Tier	Division	Place	Copa del Rey
2003–04	5	Reg. Pref.	8th	
2004–05	5	Reg. Pref.	3rd	
2005–06	5	Reg. Pref.	3rd	
2006–07	5	Reg. Pref.	7th	
2007–08	5	Reg. Pref.	13th	
2008–09	5	Reg. Pref.	13th	
2009–10	5	Pref.	15th	
2010–11	6	1ª Afic.	1st	
2011–12	5	Pref.	11th	
2012–13	5	Pref.	4th	
2013–14	5	Pref.	3rd	
2014–15	5	Pref.	3rd	
2015–16	5	Pref.	1st	
2016–17	4	3ª	11th	

- 8 seasons in Tercera División

=== Villaverde San Andrés ===
Season	Tier	Division	Place	Copa del Rey
2017–18	4	3ª	11th	
2018–19	4	3ª	5th	
2019–20	4	3ª	20th	
2020–21	4	3ª	7th / 10th	
2021–22	5	3ª RFEF	16th	
2022–23	6	Pref.	11th	
2023–24	6	Pref.	2nd	
2024–25	5	3ª Fed.	4th	
2025–26	5	3ª Fed.		

- 4 seasons in Tercera División
- 3 seasons in Tercera Federación/Tercera División RFEF

== Uniform ==
- Home kit: Green shirt, white shorts, green socks.
- Away kit: Black shirt, black shorts, black socks.
- Sports brand: Adidas

== Stadium ==
Name:Boetticher. Capacity: 5,000 spectators. Inauguration: -- Dimensions: 105 x 65

== Notable players ==
- (Dominican Republic) Enmy Peña
- (Equatorial Guinea) Eloy
- (Equatorial Guinea) Jhon Epam
- (Equatorial Guinea) Andrés Malango
- (Equatorial Guinea) Donato Malango
- (Spain) Javier del Pino
- (Spain) Borja García
- (Andorra) Josep Gómes
