= AD Arganda CF =

Spanish football club

Arganda
- Full name: Agrupación Deportiva Arganda Club de Fútbol
- Nickname: Los Vinícolas (The Wines)
- Founded: 1964
- Ground: Estadio Municipal; Arganda del Rey, Community of Madrid, Spain
- Capacity: 3,000
- Chairman: (Spain) Mariano Ruiz
- Manager: (Spain) Gonzalo Anguita
- League: Preferente de Aficionados
- 2025–26: Primera Autonómica de Aficionados – Group 2, 14th of 18 (relegated)
- Website: https://www.adarganda.com/
Home colours	Away colours

Agrupación Deportiva Arganda Club de Fútbol is a football club based in Arganda del Rey, Community of Madrid, Spain. The club was established in 1964, and play their home games at the Estadio Municipal de Arganda, inaugurated in 1980 to replace the Campo de Las Cañas.

Since its foundation, the club has spent much of his career in the Regional and Preferente categories, with sporadic participation in the Tercera División, where they played for eight seasons. In 2009, the club returned to the fourth tier after 24 years.

== History ==
The club was founded by Julian Vadillo and Juanjo Pozo on 14 February 1964 and became part of the 3rd Regular Regional. In those beginning the Arganda played their home games in the Campo de Las Cañas. The beginning of the entity flows through the various echelons of the regional categories, until in June 1974 AD Arganda achieved one of their biggest hits after rising for the first time in their history after beating Third Division in the ascent phase to Zamora CF, Third Division team.

The club were framed in the Group II Third, along with historical teams today as the Club Atlético Osasuna, Getafe CF, Real Unión, CD Logroñés or SD Eibar.

The debut in the category ended in a 4–3 win at Atletico Madrileño, Atlético Madrid reserves. The adventure of the team lasted only one year, given their poor results achieved on the road, where he was unable to win a match, only tied on four occasions. However, as local victories achieved talked about, two 4–1 to Real Union and Industrial Béjar or Eibar 3–1.

The coach at that time was Jose Esteban de la Cita, and the squad was: Luis Mariano, Pichi, Valiela, Boyarizo, Rico, Carmona, Pinilla, Borja, Echebarría, Jorge Gil, Bajo, Martínez, Sutil, Poli, Quique, Vicioso II, Vicioso III, Ungria, Denche, and sporadically Olivares, Calleja, Fernández, Barrayo, Nieto, Zurro, Castellanos and Bustamante.

After two years, the Regional A.D. Arganda returned to Third Division, where it remained for four consecutive seasons. Those years served to strengthen the team and that, under the presidency of José de Llanos, be achieved by getting the city to build a new football stadium, the current Municipal Sports Stadium, opened in 1980.

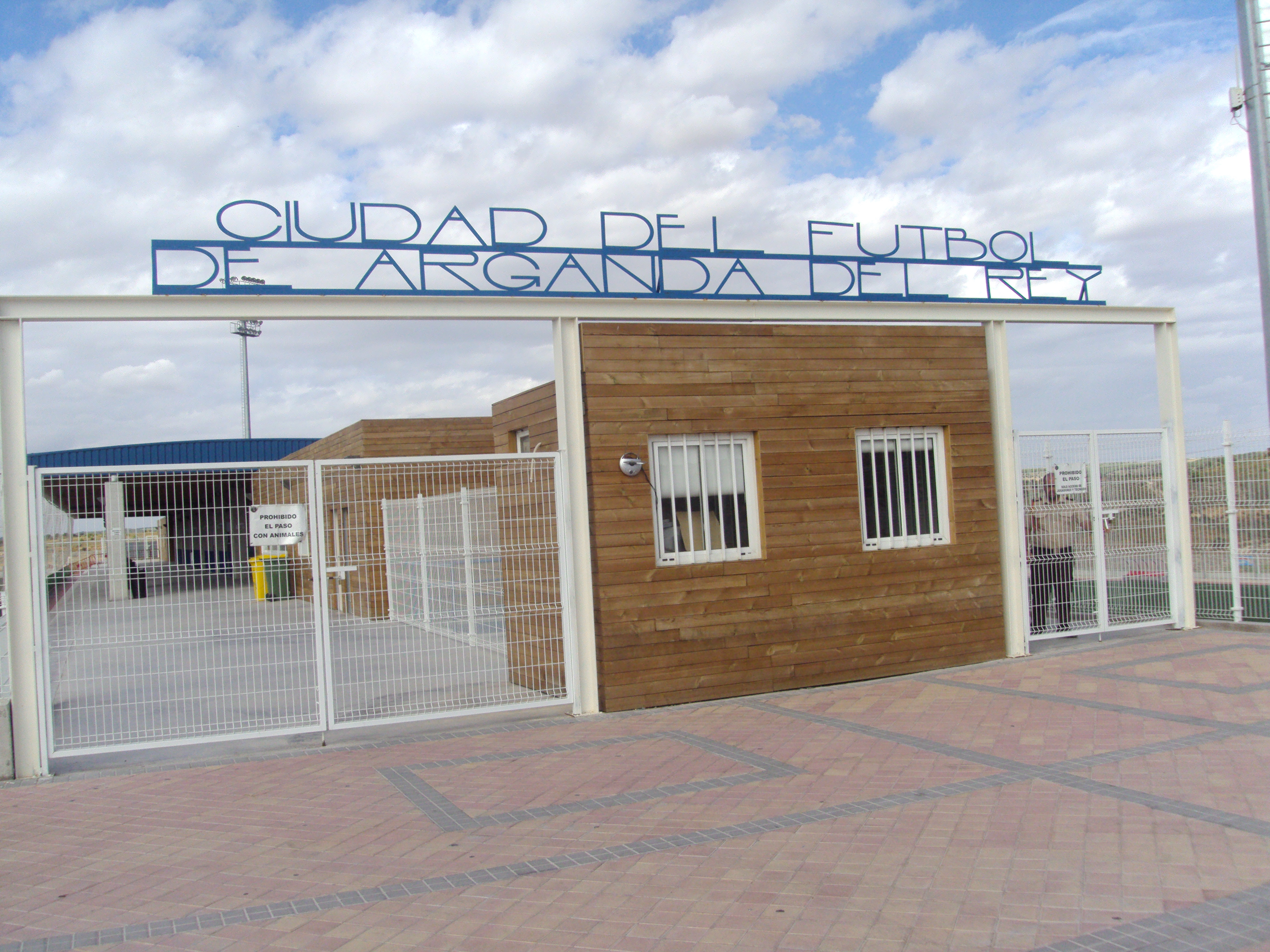
Arganda's City of Football.

Soon after, in 1982–83, was again achieved promotion to Third División, in which the club endured two seasons in the category. In 1983–84 the club argandeño that ended in what is to date his best season in the category, finishing in 14th place.

Preferential The return in 1985, a period of decline for the Arganda and with it a journey to the regional level until the 1987–88 season, in which the Club disappears because of the many debts that accumulated. After his disappearance, was formed UD Arganda, which brought together the local neighborhood teams.

This situation lasted until the 1991–92 season, the year that chairman Maximiliano Lopez takes over and manages, after City Council separated, that regains its original name Arganda, AD Arganda. A year later, in 1992–93, the Arganda returns to the preference category, which at different times managed to be among the top of the table and even stay at the gates of the rise, as happened in the 2005–06 season. Finally, it was the 2008–09 campaign in which the Arganda won the Third Division after he returned to consummate their league championship in Villarejo de Salvanés. For the first time since Maxi López became chairman, the team again reached the Third División.

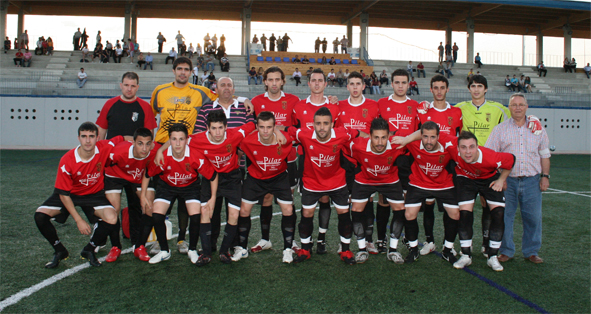
2009–10 AD Arganda's squad, the return to Third División.

In 2009, the Estadio Municipal de Arganda entered into a process of remodeling, so the AD Arganda had to play their games both at the Polideportivo de La Poveda as the new City of Football. The institution managed to put together a good set in the year of his return, 24 years later, but the economic problems that arose in the mid-campaign staff made the coach Paco Lobato and several players who came with him, leaving the club when the team marched in the comfort zone of the table.

In early season, it is usual every year the traditional dispute Trofeo Virgen de la Soledad, which takes place during the festivities of the town.

One of the most memorable players and representing the history of the club is Jorge Gil Montero, who spent ten seasons at the club between 1970 and 1980, coinciding with that golden decade of Arganda.

== Uniform ==
- Kit First: Red shirt, black trousers and half red and black.
- Second kit: Blue T-shirt, white trousers and half white.

== Stadium ==
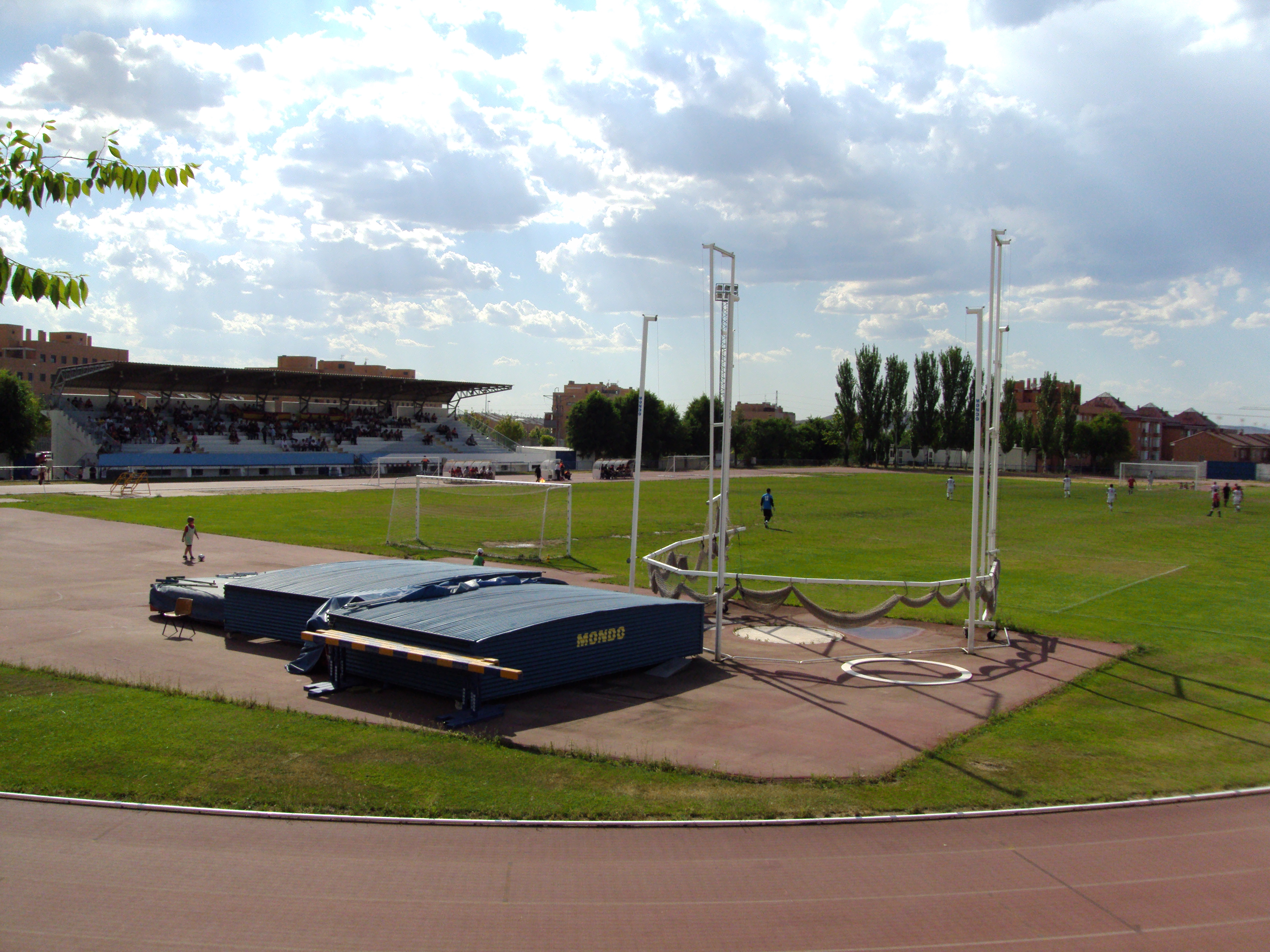
Municipal Stadium, AD Arganda's home.

The AD Arganda plays its matches in the Municipal stadium of Arganda, with capacity of 3,000 spectators. Arganda's council rebuilt Municipal after AD Arganda's promotion to Tercera División. However, the council built a new training facilities in Arganda's City of Football. This new training grounds includes medical and training facilities for the first team.

== Season to season ==
Season	Tier	Division	Place	Copa del Rey
1967–68	6	3ª Reg.	2nd	
1968–69	6	3ª Reg.	1st	
1969–70	5	2ª Reg.	3rd	
1970–71	5	2ª Reg.	4th	
1971–72	5	2ª Reg.	1st	
1972–73	4	1ª Reg.	8th	
1973–74	4	Reg. Pref.	2nd	
1974–75	3	3ª	20th	First round
1975–76	4	Reg. Pref.	5th	
1976–77	4	Reg. Pref.	3rd	
1977–78	4	3ª	15th	First round
1978–79	4	3ª	17th	First round
1979–80	4	3ª	19th	First round
1980–81	4	3ª	18th	
1981–82	5	Reg. Pref.	8th	
1982–83	5	Reg. Pref.	1st	
1983–84	4	3ª	14th	
1984–85	4	3ª	20th	
1985–86	5	Reg. Pref.	18th	
1986–87	5	Reg. Pref.	19th	

Season	Tier	Division	Place	Copa del Rey
1987–88	6	1ª Reg.	3rd	
1988–89	6	1ª Reg.	2nd	
1989–90	5	Reg. Pref.	16th	
1990–91	6	1ª Reg.	4th	
1991–92	6	1ª Reg.	7th	
1992–93	6	1ª Reg.	4th	
1993–94	6	1ª Reg.	1st	
1994–95	5	Reg. Pref.	10th	
1995–96	5	Reg. Pref.	6th	
1996–97	5	Reg. Pref.	13th	
1997–98	5	Reg. Pref.	17th	
1998–99	6	1ª Reg.	1st	
1999–2000	5	Reg. Pref.	17th	
2000–01	6	1ª Reg.	1st	
2001–02	5	Reg. Pref.	10th	
2002–03	5	Reg. Pref.	5th	
2003–04	5	Reg. Pref.	3rd	
2004–05	5	Reg. Pref.	5th	
2005–06	5	Reg. Pref.	14th	
2006–07	5	Reg. Pref.	5th	

Season	Tier	Division	Place	Copa del Rey
2007–08	5	Reg. Pref.	5th	
2008–09	5	Reg. Pref.	1st	
2009–10	4	3ª	17th	
2010–11	5	Pref.	15th	
2011–12	6	1ª Afic.	4th	
2012–13	6	1ª Afic.	1st	
2013–14	5	Pref.	11th	
2014–15	5	Pref.	11th	
2015–16	5	Pref.	7th	
2016–17	5	Pref.	10th	
2017–18	5	Pref.	14th	
2018–19	5	Pref.	8th	
2019–20	5	Pref.	13th	
2020–21	5	Pref.	12th	
2021–22	6	Pref.	13th	
2022–23	7	1ª Afic.	3rd	
2023–24	6	Pref.	15th	
2024–25	7	Pref. Afic.	1st	
2025–26	6	1ª Aut.		

- 8 seasons in Tercera División

== Notable players ==
- (Equatorial Guinea) Eloy Edu
