= 2005–06 CA Osasuna season =

CA Osasuna
2005–06 season
- Manager: Javier Aguirre
- Stadium: El Sadar
- La Liga: 4th
- UEFA Cup: First round
- Copa del Rey: Round of 16
- Top goalscorer: League: Savo Milošević (11); All: Savo Milošević (12)

During the 2005–06 season, CA Osasuna competed in La Liga, the top division of Spanish football, as well as the Copa del Rey and UEFA Cup.

== Season summary ==
The culmination of a consolidated CA Osasuna in the elite of football came the 2005–06 season. It was Javier Aguirre’s fourth consecutive year as the manager and CA Osasuna had just returned to European competition the previous year on the 2005–06 La Liga. The 2005–06 La Liga CA Osasuna season was a historic season for the club. After 38 league games, the team managed to finished 4th in La Liga only falling behind F.C. Barcelona, Real Madrid and Valencia. For the second time in its history, CA Osasuna finished 4th in the Spanish first division league, obtaining the qualification for the first time in the club history to the UEFA Champions League. They would end up falling against Hamburger SV on the previous qualification to the Champions League 2006-07, drawing both leg-games but losing the qualification. Automatically CA Osasuna dropped and played the UEFA Europa League on the 2006–07 season. The 2005–06 La Liga season was the season that CA Osasuna recorded the most points on a single season in its history. Also, they were able to finished 2nd in the league before Christmas break with 36 points, finishing on top of Real Madrid and Valencia and only falling behind F.C Barcelona. Javier Aguirre would end up leaving the following season to manage Atletico de Madrid due to the success of the 2005-06 season. During the season, CA Osasuna stadium name was changed from El Sadar to Reyno de Navarra.

== First-team squad ==
Squad at end of season

Note: Flags indicate national team as defined under FIFA eligibility rules; some limited exceptions apply. Players may hold more than one non-FIFA nationality.

No.	Pos.	Nation	Player
1	GK	ESP	Juan Elía
2	DF	ESP	José Izquierdo
3	DF	ESP	Rafael Clavero
4	DF	ESP	Miguel Flaño
5	DF	ESP	Carlos Cuéllar
6	MF	ESP	Raúl García
7	DF	ESP	César Cruchaga
8	MF	ESP	Juan Manuel Ortiz (on loan from Atlético Madrid)
9	FW	SCG	Savo Milošević
10	MF	ESP	Francisco Puñal
11	MF	MAR	Moha
12	MF	ESP	Fran Moreno

No.	Pos.	Nation	Player
13	GK	ESP	Ricardo
14	DF	ESP	Josetxo
15	FW	CMR	Pierre Webó
16	MF	ESP	David López
17	DF	ESP	Javier Flaño
18	MF	URU	Marcelo Sosa (on loan from Atlético Madrid)
19	DF	ESP	Enrique Corrales
20	FW	ARG	Bernardo Romeo
21	MF	ESP	Valdo
22	MF	ESP	Iñaki Muñoz
23	MF	FRA	Ludovic Delporte
26	GK	ESP	Roberto Santamaría

=== Left club during season ===
Note: Flags indicate national team as defined under FIFA eligibility rules; some limited exceptions apply. Players may hold more than one non-FIFA nationality.

No.	Pos.	Nation	Player
24	FW	ESP	Gorka Brit (on loan to Eibar)

== Competitions ==
=== La Liga ===
==== League table ====
Pos	Team	Pld	W	D	L	GF	GA	GD	Pts	Qualification or relegation
2	Real Madrid	38	20	10	8	70	40	+30	70	Qualification for the Champions League group stage
3	Valencia	38	19	12	7	58	33	+25	69	Qualification for the Champions League third qualifying round
4	Osasuna	38	21	5	12	49	43	+6	68	Qualification for the Champions League third qualifying round
5	Sevilla	38	20	8	10	54	39	+15	68	Qualification for the UEFA Cup first round
6	Celta Vigo	38	20	4	14	45	33	+12	64	Qualification for the UEFA Cup first round

Source: LFP
Rules for classification: 1st points; 2nd head-to-head points; 3rd head-to-head goal difference; 4th head-to-head goals scored; 5th goal difference; 6th number of goals scored; 7th Fair-play points

=== UEFA Cup ===
15 September 2005 First round 1st leg	Rennes (France)	3–1	(Spain) Osasuna	Stade de la Route de Lorient, Rennes
19:00	Frei 27', 74'; Hadji 84'	Report	Milošević 52'	Attendance: 20,525; Referee: Cristian Balaj (Romania)

29 September 2005 First round 2nd leg	Osasuna (Spain)	0–0 (1–3 agg.)	(France) Rennes	Estadio Reyno de Navarra, Pamplona
20:30		Report		Attendance: 18,000; Referee: Georgios Kasnaferis (Greece)
