= Susan Ngongi Namondo =

Cameroonian administrator and diplomat

- Born: 1 January 1970 (age 56); Cameroon
- Citizenship: Cameroon
- Education: University of Maryland (Bachelor of Arts in Political Science) (Bachelor of Science in Animal Science); Columbia University (Master of Public Administration); University of Reading (Master of Science in Animal Health)
- Occupations: Animal Scientist, Public Administrator & Diplomat
- Years active: 1996 — present
- Known for: Diplomacy
- Title: The United Nations Resident Coordinator in Uganda

Susan Ngongi Namondo is a Cameroonian animal scientist, public administrator and diplomat, who serves as the United Nations' representative and coordinator in Uganda, since June 2021. Immediately before that, from 2017 until 2021, she served in the same capacity in Eritrea, based in the city of Asmara, the capital of that country.

== Background and education ==
Ngongi Namondo is a citizen of Cameroon. She holds a Bachelor of Arts degree in political science and a Bachelor of Science degree in animal science, both from the University of Maryland in the United States. Her degree of Master of Public Administration was awarded by Columbia University in New York City. She also earned a Master of Science degree in animal health from the University of Reading in the United Kingdom.

== Career ==
For the past 25 years or thereabout, Ngongi Namondo has served in various roles for international organizations and global non-government organizations (NGOs) in the areas of social development, economic development and humanitarian assistance. Before joining the United Nations in 2000, she worked with Catholic Relief Services, Caritas Internationalis and Bioversity International (formerly International Plant Genetic Resources Institute).

She served as a consultant at the International Plant Genetic Resources Institute (today Biodiversity International), in Rome, Italy in 2000. She then served one year consecutive stints as a Resident Project Officer based in Rumbek, Sudan and in Lokichoggio, Kenya, working with the United Nations Children's Fund (UNICEF). She was then transferred to Malakal, Sudan as an Emergency Officer with UNICEF, working there in 2004. The following year, she was transferred to Nairobi, Kenya, working there in the same capacity for one year.

In 2006, UNICEF transferred her to New York City, as an Emergency Programme Specialist, serving in that role for two years. She was then relocated to West Africa, serving as Deputy UNICEF Representative to Liberia for the two years 2008–2010, based in Monrovia, Liberia's capital city. For the next three years, 2010–2013, she moved east, serving as the UNICEF Representative to Comoros, based in Moroni, the country's capital city. She went back west to serve as the UNICEF Representative to Ghana, based in Accra, for the next four years from 2013 until 2017.

In 2017, she was appointed as the United Nations Resident Coordinator and Humanitarian Coordinator in Eritrea, serving there for the next four years. In June 2021, she was relocated to Uganda, in the same capacity, based in Kampala, the country's capital city.

== Other considerations ==
Susan Ngongi Namondo presented her credentials to Uganda's Foreign Minister, General Jeje Odongo on 16 July 2021, in Kampala. On 26 July 2021, she presented her credentials to Yoweri Kaguta Museveni, the President of Uganda, at State House, Entebbe. She replaced Rosa Malango, who was promoted to serve as Director of UN Regional Commissions New York Office, based in New York City.
