= Joshua Zapata =

Spanish footballer

Joshua
Personal information
- Full name: Joshua Zapata González
- Date of birth: 28 January 1989 (age 37)
- Place of birth: Madrid, Spain
- Height: 1.80 m (5 ft 11 in)
- Position: Midfielder

Team information
- Current team: Alcobendas Sport

Youth career
- Atlético Madrid

Senior career*
Years	Team	Apps	(Gls)
2007–2010	Atlético B	61	(5)
2008	Atlético Madrid	1	(0)
2010–2011	Rayo Majadahonda	26	(8)
2011–2013	Zaragoza B	31	(4)
2013–2014	Puerta Bonita	33	(1)
2014–2015	Sariñena	18	(3)
2015–2016	Arroyo	22	(2)
2016–2017	Guadalajara	13	(2)
2017	Portugalete	7	(2)
2017–2018	Alcalá	29	(1)
2019–	Alcobendas Sport	1	(0)

International career
2005	Spain U16	1	(0)
- * Club domestic league appearances and goals as of 8 September 2019

Joshua Zapata González (born 28 January 1989), known simply as Joshua, is a Spanish professional footballer who plays for Fútbol Alcobendas Sport as a midfielder.

== Club career ==
Born in Madrid, Joshua played his youth football with local Atlético Madrid. He spent the vast majority of his senior spell with the club, however, registered with the reserves in Segunda División B.

Joshua made his La Liga debut for the first team on 18 May 2008, playing 15 minutes in a 1–3 away loss to Valencia CF for the season's last round. In summer 2010 he left and signed with neighbouring CF Rayo Majadahonda from Tercera División, where he notably scored a goal against his former employer's C-side on 19 December.
