= Pollo (footballer) =

Spanish footballer

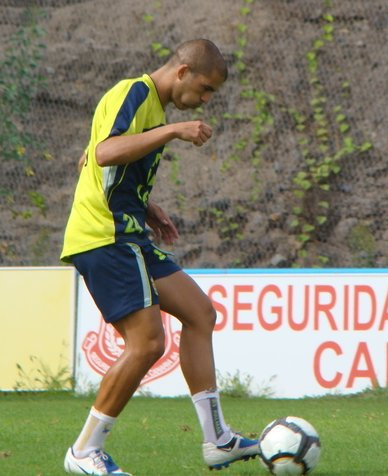
- Pollo in training with Las Palmas

Personal information
- Full name: Adrián José Hernández Acosta
- Date of birth: 2 May 1983 (age 43)
- Place of birth: Mogán, Spain
- Height: 1.76 m (5 ft 9 in)
- Position: Midfielder

Youth career
- Maspalomas
- 2000–2002: Las Palmas

Senior career*
Years	Team	Apps	(Gls)
2002–2003	Las Palmas B		
2003–2005	Vecindario	53	(2)
2005–2007	Atlético Madrid B	57	(3)
2007	Atlético Madrid	1	(0)
2007–2009	Universidad LP	63	(10)
2009–2011	Las Palmas	23	(1)
2011–2012	Vecindario	34	(4)
2012–2013	S.S. Reyes	6	(0)
2013–2014	Vecindario	30	(2)
2014–2015	San Fernando	?	(10)
Total		267+	(32)
- * Club domestic league appearances and goals

Adrián José Hernández Acosta (born 2 May 1983), known as Pollo, is a Spanish former professional footballer who played as a midfielder.

== Club career ==
Born in Mogán, Las Palmas, Pollo played youth football with UD Las Palmas. His professional debut was made at neighbours UD Vecindario, with whom he spent two years in the Segunda División B.

In 2005, Pollo signed for Atlético Madrid, spending two seasons with the reserves also in the third tier. On 6 January 2007, he played his only game in La Liga, coming on as a substitute for Luciano Galletti in the last minute of the home fixture against Gimnàstic de Tarragona (0–0).

Pollo returned to his native Canary Islands in summer 2007, joining Universidad de Las Palmas CF in division three. After two solid campaigns, he returned to former youth club Las Palmas, now in the Segunda División. He scored his only goal as a professional on 12 May 2011, closing the 2–0 home win over FC Cartagena.
