= Jhon Epam =

Equatoguinean footballer (born 1983)

Personal information
- Full name: Jhon Epam Nwankwo
- Date of birth: 5 May 1983 (age 43)
- Place of birth: Malabo, Equatorial Guinea
- Height: 1.85 m (6 ft 1 in)
- Position: Striker

Senior career*
Years	Team	Apps	(Gls)
200?–2008	The Panters		
2008	Colonia Moscardó	5	(0)
2009	Montijo-San Antolín	1	(1)
2009	Puerta Bonita	1	(0)
2009	Montijo-San Antolín	6	(0)
2009	Colmenar Viejo	1	(0)
2010	SR Villaverde Boetticher	3	(0)

International career^{‡}
- Equatorial Guinea
- * Club domestic league appearances and goals as of 28 April 2009 ‡ National team caps and goals as of 28 April 2009

Jhon Epam Nwankwo (born 5 May 1983) is an Equatoguinean former footballer who played as a striker.

== Club career ==
Epam has played for The Panters F.C. in the Equatoguinean Premier League. In 2008, he moved to Spain. There, he played for Villaverde Boetticher in the Preferente de la Comunidad de Madrid Group 2).

== Personal life ==
Epam also holds Spanish citizenship (his father naturalised in 1997).
