= Raúl García (footballer, born 1986) =

Spanish footballer (born 1986)

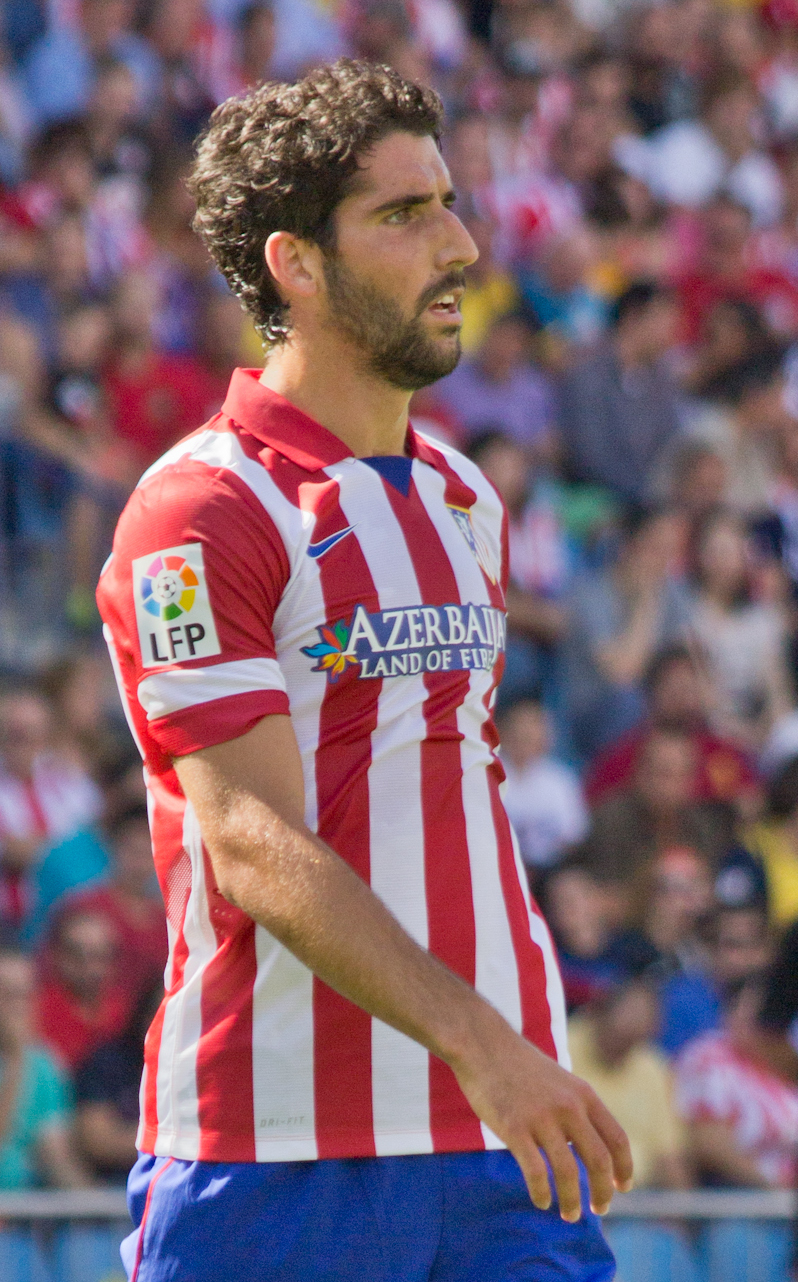
- García playing with Atlético Madrid in 2013

Personal information
- Full name: Raúl García Escudero
- Date of birth: 11 July 1986 (age 40)
- Place of birth: Pamplona, Spain
- Height: 1.84 m (6 ft 0 in)
- Positions: Attacking midfielder; second striker

Youth career
- Ardoi
- 2000–2004: Osasuna

Senior career*
Years	Team	Apps	(Gls)
2004–2005	Osasuna B	28	(3)
2004–2007	Osasuna	68	(9)
2007–2015	Atlético Madrid	216	(25)
2011–2012	→ Osasuna (loan)	33	(11)
2015–2024	Athletic Bilbao	292	(65)
Total		637	(113)

International career
2004–2005	Spain U19	7	(4)
2006–2009	Spain U21	20	(1)
2014	Spain	2	(0)
2004–2005	Navarre	2	(0)
2005	Basque Country	1	(0)
- * Club domestic league appearances and goals

Raúl García Escudero (Spanish pronunciation: [raˈul ɣaɾˈθi.a eskuˈðeɾo]; (Note: In isolation, García is pronounced [ɡaɾˈθi.a].) born 11 July 1986) is a Spanish former professional footballer who played as an attacking midfielder or second striker.

Developed at Osasuna, he spent most of his early career at Atlético Madrid, scoring 44 goals in 329 games in all competitions over eight seasons and winning six major titles, including the 2014 national championship and the 2010 Europa League. In 2015 he signed with Athletic Bilbao, going on to have an equally lengthy spell and win the 2021 Supercopa de España as well as the 2023–24 Copa del Rey; in 20 seasons in La Liga, he totalled 609 appearances and 110 goals.

García played twice with Spain, making his debut in 2014.

== Club career ==
=== Osasuna ===
Born in Pamplona, García played for hometown club Osasuna during his first years as a professional. On 24 October 2004, he made his debut for the first team in a 3–0 away defeat against Barcelona, with his first chance being offered by Mexican coach Javier Aguirre.

García scored five league goals (the first on 26 October 2005 in a 3–2 home win over Athletic Bilbao) in his first full season as the Navarrese finished in fourth place in La Liga, starting in 28 of his 33 appearances at the age of just 19.

=== Atlético Madrid ===
In July 2007, after helping Osasuna to the semi-finals of the UEFA Cup with one goal in 12 games, García signed a five-year contract with Atlético Madrid. He reunited with his former boss Aguirre upon the €13 million deal.

In January 2010, García lost his starting position to newly signed Tiago Mendes, who had arrived on loan from Juventus. However, he started the UEFA Europa League final against Fulham, as the Portuguese was cup-tied, playing the full 90 minutes and extra time in the 2–1 victory for the first honour of his career; additionally, he appeared in the second half of the Copa del Rey's decider against Sevilla, a 2–0 loss.

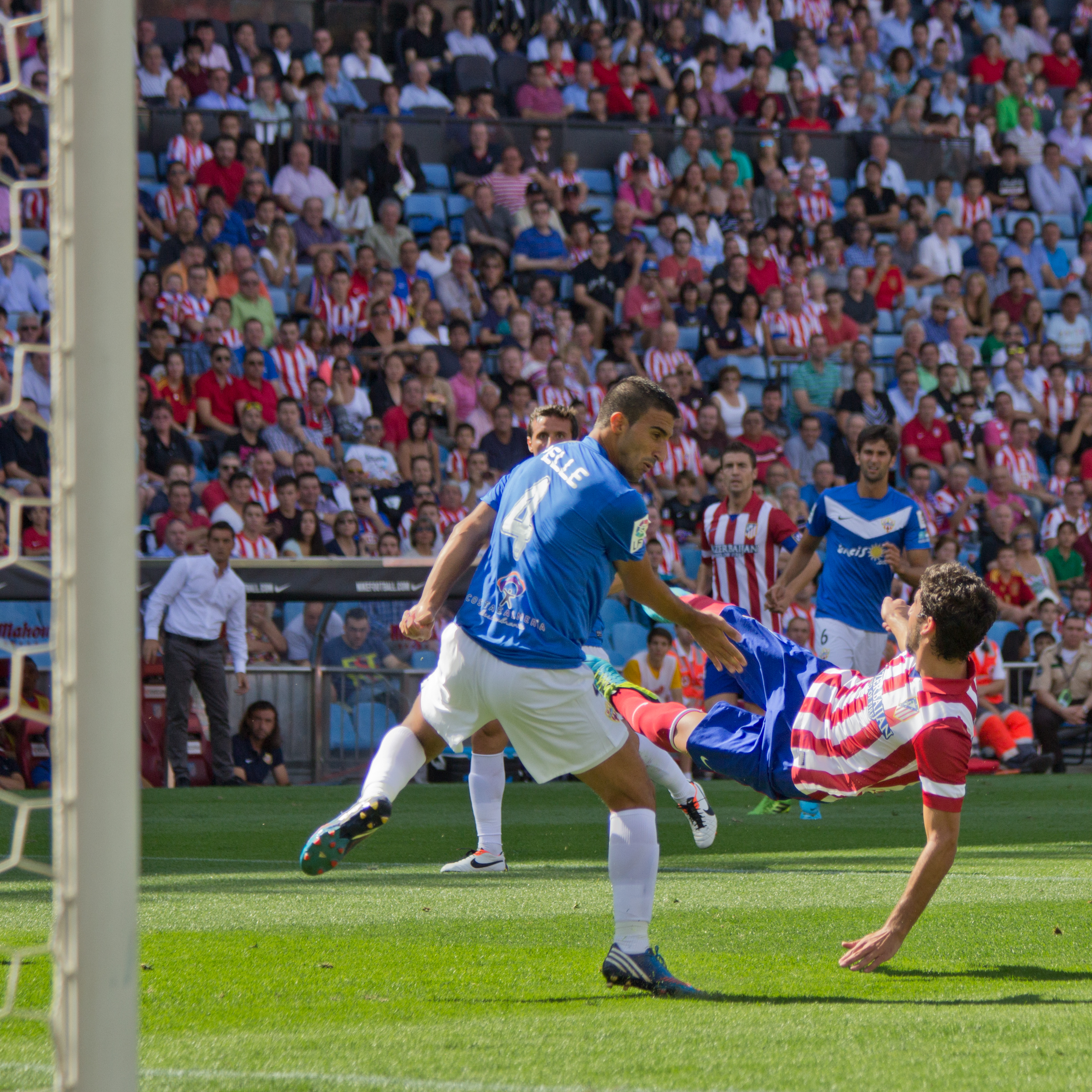
García (right) in action against Almería in September 2013

On 27 August 2010, García featured the entire match in the UEFA Super Cup against Inter Milan, giving away a penalty kick in the last minute for a foul on Goran Pandev; the shot was however saved by David de Gea, and the Colchoneros won it 2–0. Again, he played significantly less minutes than Tiago, but still managed to collect 29 league appearances as Atlético finally qualified for the Europa League, and netted his only goal of the season in a 2–1 home loss to eventual champions Barcelona, heading in from a corner kick.

After renewing his contract for a further three years, García was loaned to former club Osasuna for 2011–12, where he began to appear more prominently as an attacking midfielder. He scored 11 goals during the campaign, including twice against Mallorca – both through headers from corners by Álvaro Cejudo (2–2)– and one in a defeat of Barcelona (3–2), finishing as team top scorer with four more goals than Ibrahima Baldé.

On 9 April 2014, after playing the full 90 minutes in a 1–0 UEFA Champions League home defeat of Barcelona that qualified Atlético Madrid for the semi-finals for the first time in 40 years, García became the club's most capped player in the competition with 22 appearances, surpassing Luis Aragonés. On 19 August he scored a 88th-minute 1–1 equaliser against Real Madrid at the Santiago Bernabéu Stadium in the Supercopa de España, as his team went on to win the trophy 2–1 on aggregate and claim it for the second time in their history.

=== Athletic Bilbao ===
On 31 August 2015, after a transfer request, García signed a four-year contract with Athletic Bilbao which included a release clause of €40 million. He scored in his first appearance, helping to a 3–1 home victory over Getafe where he featured 79 minutes.

García made his 100th appearance for the club in October 2017. In late May 2018, after he had scored ten league goals in each of his first two seasons, he and Athletic agreed on a contract extension running to June 2020.

On 20 July 2019, the 33-year-old García agreed to a one-year extension at the San Mamés Stadium until June 2021, with no release clause. He scored a career-best 15 goals that campaign (seven penalties) – entering the league's record books after becoming the first player to find the net in every month of a calendar year – but his team could only finish 11th.

García became only the 11th player in La Liga history to reach 500 games in the competition on 31 December 2020, in a 1–0 home Basque derby loss to Real Sociedad. His 600th appearance came on 12 February 2024 in a 0–0 draw at Almería.

In the final of the Copa del Rey against Mallorca on 6 April 2024, García was the first Athletic player to take a penalty in the deciding shoot-out, which he scored (his side went on to win 4–2); a commentator remarked "his pulse stayed steady". One week later, he announced his retirement from professional football at the end of the season, with the club praising him as an "unforgettable lion" in a statement.

When he retired, García's tally of 609 Spanish top-flight matches was the third-best in history, only behind Joaquín and Andoni Zubizarreta's 622.

== International career ==
García played with the Spain under-21s from 2006 to 2009, earning a total of 20 caps in the category and representing the nation at the 2009 UEFA European Championship, in a group-stage exit. He also appeared for the under-19 team.

On 29 August 2014, aged 28, García was named by full side manager Vicente del Bosque in a 23-man squad for matches against France and Macedonia in September. He made his debut on 4 September, starting and featuring 58 minutes in a 1–0 friendly loss to the former.

In 2004 and 2005, García took part in representative games for both Navarre and the Basque Country.

== Style of play ==
García was known for scoring from the bench and having good aerial ability. A competent penalty taker, he was also often deployed as a false 9 due to his movements off the ball.

== Career statistics ==
=== Club ===
Appearances and goals by club, season and competition
Club	Season	League			Copa del Rey		Europe		Other		Total	
Club	Season	Division	Apps	Goals	Apps	Goals	Apps	Goals	Apps	Goals	Apps	Goals
Osasuna B	2004–05	Segunda División B	28	3	—		—		—		28	3
Osasuna	2004–05	La Liga	2	0	1	0	—		—		3	0
Osasuna	2005–06	La Liga	33	5	1	0	2 (Note: Appearances in UEFA Europa League)	0	—		36	5
Osasuna	2006–07	La Liga	33	4	5	0	14 (Note: Appearances in UEFA Champions League and UEFA Europa League)	1	—		52	5
Osasuna	Total		68	9	7	0	16	1	—		91	10
Atlético Madrid	2007–08	La Liga	35	3	5	0	9	1	—		49	4
Atlético Madrid	2008–09	La Liga	36	3	2	0	10 (Note: Appearances in UEFA Champions League)	1	—		48	4
Atlético Madrid	2009–10	La Liga	20	0	9	0	12	0	—		41	0
Atlético Madrid	2010–11	La Liga	29	1	5	0	6	0	1 (Note: Appearance in UEFA Super Cup)	0	41	1
Atlético Madrid	2011–12	La Liga	0	0	0	0	2	0	—		2	0
Atlético Madrid	2012–13	La Liga	30	5	8	2	8	2	1	0	47	9
Atlético Madrid	2013–14	La Liga	34	9	7	4	12	4	0	0	53	17
Atlético Madrid	2014–15	La Liga	31	4	4	2	10	2	2 (Note: Appearances in Supercopa de España)	1	47	9
Atlético Madrid	2015–16	La Liga	1	0	0	0	0	0	—		1	0
Atlético Madrid	Total		216	25	40	8	69	10	4	1	329	44
Osasuna (loan)	2011–12	La Liga	33	11	2	0	—		—		35	11
Athletic Bilbao	2015–16	La Liga	30	7	2	1	9	3	0	0	41	11
Athletic Bilbao	2016–17	La Liga	36	10	3	3	7	1	—		46	14
Athletic Bilbao	2017–18	La Liga	34	10	2	1	12	3	—		48	14
Athletic Bilbao	2018–19	La Liga	33	9	1	0	—		—		34	9
Athletic Bilbao	2019–20	La Liga	35	15	8 (Note: Includes appearance in 2020 Copa del Rey final (played in 2021))	0	—		—		43	15
Athletic Bilbao	2020–21	La Liga	34	5	6	3	—		2	2	42	10
Athletic Bilbao	2021–22	La Liga	35	6	5	1	—		2	0	42	7
Athletic Bilbao	2022–23	La Liga	35	2	7	1	—		—		41	3
Athletic Bilbao	2023–24	La Liga	20	1	5	0	—		—		25	1
Athletic Bilbao	Total		292	65	39	10	28	7	4	2	363	84
Career total			637	113	88	18	113	18	8	3	846	152

=== International ===
Appearances and goals by national team and year
National team	Year	Apps	Goals
Spain	2014	2	0
Total		2	0

== Honours ==
Atlético Madrid

- La Liga: 2013–14
- Copa del Rey: 2012–13; runner-up: 2009–10
- Supercopa de España: 2014; runner-up: 2013
- UEFA Europa League: 2009–10
- UEFA Super Cup: 2010, 2012
- UEFA Champions League runner-up: 2013–14

Athletic Bilbao

- Copa del Rey: 2023–24; runner-up: 2019–20, 2020–21
- Supercopa de España: 2021

== See also ==
- List of Atlético Madrid players (+100)
- List of Athletic Bilbao players (+200 appearances)
- List of footballers with 400 or more La Liga appearances
