= Didi (footballer, born 1985) =

Spanish footballer

Personal information
- Full name: Didac Rodríguez González
- Date of birth: 20 February 1985 (age 41)
- Place of birth: Barcelona, Spain
- Height: 1.77 m (5 ft 9 1/2 in)
- Position: Winger

Youth career
- Cornellà
- Barcelona

Senior career*
Years	Team	Apps	(Gls)
2005–2007	Racing Santander B	64	(7)
2007–2009	Atlético Madrid B	44	(2)
2009–2010	Slavia Sofia	6	(1)
2010–2011	Dénia	16	(1)
2011–2014	Cornellà	55	(1)
2014–2015	Santboià	27	(3)
2015–2016	Granollers	12	(7)
2016–2017	Sant Cugat	8	(6)
2017	Cerdanyola	7	(1)
2018	Tortosa	10	(1)
- * Club domestic league appearances and goals

Didac Rodríguez González (born 20 February 1985), commonly known as Didi, is a Spanish former footballer who played as a winger.

== Football career ==
Didi was born in Barcelona, Catalonia. An unsuccessful youth graduate at local – and La Liga – giants FC Barcelona, he started his senior career in 2005 with Racing de Santander B in the third division. Two years later he moved to another reserve team, Atlético Madrid B, also playing in that tier.

After an unassuming spell in Bulgaria with PFC Slavia Sofia, Didi returned to his country and joined CD Dénia, still in the third level.
