= Jhon Murillo (Colombian footballer) =

Colombian footballer (born 1990)

Personal information
- Full name: Jhon Wilson Murillo Córdoba
- Date of birth: 6 November 1990 (age 36)
- Place of birth: Urabá, Colombia
- Height: 1.78 m (5 ft 10 in)
- Position: Midfielder

Team information
- Current team: Tigres

Senior career*
Years	Team	Apps	(Gls)
2008	Danubio		
2009	Peñarol		
2009–2010	Marathón		
2011–2013	Lecce		
2013–2014	América de Cali	10	(0)
2015	Londrina	2	(0)
2016	Tigres	3	(0)
- * Club domestic league appearances and goals as of 26 January 2017

Jhon Wilson Murillo Córdoba (born November 6, 1990) is a Colombian footballer who plays as midfielder for Tigres.

== Career statistics ==
As of 26 January 2017

Club	Season	League			State League		Cup		Conmebol		Other		Total	
Club	Season	Division	Apps	Goals	Apps	Goals	Apps	Goals	Apps	Goals	Apps	Goals	Apps	Goals
América de Cali	2013	Primera B	5	0	—		6	0	—		—		11	0
América de Cali	2014	Primera B	5	0	—		—		—		—		5	0
América de Cali	Subtotal		10	0	—		6	0	—		—		16	0
Londrina	2015	Série C	2	0	3	0	1	0	—		—		6	0
Tigres	2016	Primera B	3	0	—		—		—		—		3	0
Career total			15	0	3	0	7	0	0	0	0	0	25	0
