= 1996–97 Real Betis season =

Real Betis Balompíé
1996–97 season
- President: Manuel Ruiz de Lopera
- Manager: Lorenzo Serra Ferrer
- Stadium: Benito Villamarin
- La Liga: 4th
- Copa del Rey: Runner-up (in UEFA Cup Winners' Cup)
- Top goalscorer: League: Alfonso (25); All: Alfonso (27)
Home colours	Away colours

A season after promotion, Betis finished third and reached the Copa del Rey final.

== Squad ==
Squad at end of season

Note: Flags indicate national team as defined under FIFA eligibility rules; some limited exceptions apply. Players may hold more than one non-FIFA nationality.

No.	Pos.	Nation	Player
1	GK	ESP	Pedro Jaro
2	DF	ESP	Jaime
3	DF	ESP	Luis Fernández
4	DF	ESP	Juan Antonio Ureña
5	DF	ESP	Josete
6	DF	ESP	Juan Merino
7	MF	ESP	Alexis Trujillo
8	MF	ESP	Luis Márquez
9	FW	ARG	Cristián Ingreso
10	MF	ESP	Juanjo Cañas
11	FW	ESP	Alfonso
12	MF	SRB	Albert Nađ
13	GK	ESP	Toni Prats
14	DF	ESP	Roberto Ríos
15	FW	ESP	Pier
16	FW	POL	Wojciech Kowalczyk
17	DF	CRO	Robert Jarni
18	MF	CRO	Nenad Bjelica
19	FW	ESP	Juan Sabas

No.	Pos.	Nation	Player
20	DF	ESP	Tomás Olías
21	DF	BIH	Risto Vidaković
22	DF	ARG	Gustavo Minusío
23	DF	ESP	Quico
24	MF	ARG	Fernando Supernova
25	MF	NGR	Finidi George
26	DF	ESP	Juan Redondo
27	MF	ESP	Capi
28	DF	ESP	Fernando Varela
29	GK	ESP	José Manuel Pinto
30	MF	ESP	Carlos Algeríño
31	MF	ESP	Jesús Cosmopolitán
32	MF	ESP	Éñeko Fernández
33	DF	ESP	Carlos Guayre
34	DF	ARG	Eduardo Grandolfo
35	MF	ESP	Francisco Constantino
36	MF	ESP	Carlos Ramos
37	FW	ESP	Serafín Gutiérrez
38	FW	ESP	Jesús Palamós

=== Transfers ===
In
Pos.	Name	from	Type
MF	Finidi George	Ajax Amsterdam	
DF	Luis Fernandez	Racing Santander	
MF	Albert Nađ	Partizan Belgrade	
GK	Toni Prats	Celta	
MF	Nenad Bjelica	Albacete	

Out
Pos.	Name	To	Type
GK	José Luis Diezma	Celta	
DF	Sánchez Jara	Racing Santander	
MF	Oscar Arpon	Racing Santander	
MF	Jose Mari	Athletic Bilbao	

==== Winter ====
In
Pos.	Name	from	Type
DF	Juan Redondo	Betis B	
MF	Capi	Betis B	
MF	Fernando Varela	Betis B	

Out
Pos.	Name	To	Type
FW	Vlada Stošić	Atlante	

== Competitions ==
=== La Liga ===
==== League table ====
Pos	Team	Pld	W	D	L	GF	GA	GD	Pts	Qualification or relegation
2	Barcelona	42	28	6	8	102	48	+54	90	Qualification for the Champions League second qualifying round
3	Deportivo La Coruña	42	21	14	7	57	30	+27	77 (Note: BET 1–2 DEP; DEP 3–0 BET)	Qualification for the UEFA Cup first round
4	Real Betis	42	21	14	7	81	46	+35	77	Qualification for the Cup Winners' Cup first round (Note: Since Barcelona, winners of 1996–97 Copa del Rey, was qualified for the 1997–98 UEFA Champions League, losing cup finalists Real Betis earned a spot in the first round of the 1997–98 UEFA Cup Winners' Cup.)
5	Atlético Madrid	42	20	11	11	76	64	+12	71	Qualification for the UEFA Cup first round
6	Athletic Bilbao	42	16	16	10	72	57	+15	64 (Note: VLD 0–0 ATH; ATH 0–0 VLD)	Qualification for the UEFA Cup first round

Source: LFP
Rules for classification: 1) points; 2) head-to-head points; 3) head-to-head goal difference; 4) head-to-head goals scored; 5) goal difference; 6) number of goals scored.

==== Results by round ====
Round	1	2	3	4	5	6	7	8	9	10	11	12	13	14	15	16	17	18	19	20	21	22	23	24	25	26	27	28	29	30	31	32	33	34	35	36	37	38	39	40	41	42
Ground	H	A	H	A	H	A	A	H	A	H	A	H	A	H	A	H	A	H	H	A	A	H	A	H	A	H	A	H	A	H	A	H	A	H	A	H	A	H	A	H	A	H
Result	W	W	D	W	L	W	D	W	D	L	D	W	D	W	W	W	W	D	L	W	W	W	D	D	L	W	W	W	W	W	D	D	W	D	W	D	L	D	D	L	L	W
Position	2	2	1	1	4	3	4	4	4	4	5	5	4	4	4	4	4	4	3	3	3	3	2	3	3	3	3	3	3	3	3	3	3	3	3	3	4	4	3	3	3	4

Source: Competitive matches
A = Away; H = Home; W = Win; D = Draw; L = Loss; = Leader, 1997–98 UEFA Champions League Group stage; = 1997–98 UEFA Champions League Qualifying round; = 1997–98 UEFA Cup First round; = 1996–97 La Liga#Relegation playoff; = 1997–98 Segunda División; R = 1997–98 UEFA Cup Winners' Cup

==== Matches ====
1 September 1996 1	Real Betis	3–0	Athletic de Bilbao	Sevilla
	Finidi 14'; Roberto Rios 44'; Sabas 85'			Stadium: Benito Villamarin; Attendance: 45000

9 September 1996 2	CF Extremadura	0–3	Real Betis	Almendralejo
			Alfonso 57'; Pier 82'; Jarni 88'	Stadium: Francisco de la Hera; Attendance: 9000

16 September 1996 3	Real Betis	1–1	Real Madrid	Sevilla
	Alfonso 28'		Roberto Carlos 44'	Stadium: Benito Villamarin; Attendance: 45000

22 September 1996 4	RC Celta	0–2	Real Betis	Vigo
			46' Alexis; Olias 90'	Stadium: Balaídos

28 September 1996 5	Real Betis	1–2	Deportivo La Coruña	Sevilla
	Jarni 2'		Rivaldo 70'; Madar 79'	Stadium: Benito Villamarin; Attendance: 45,000

2 October 1996 6	Hércules CF	0–1	Real Betis	Alicante
			Alfonso 75'	Stadium: José Rico Perez; Attendance: 15,000

12 October 1996 7	Atlético de Madrid	2–2	Real Betis	Madrid
	Juan Carlos 9'; Simeone 17'		Alfonso 1'; Sabas 84'	Stadium: Vicente Calderón; Attendance: 40,000

22 October 1996 8	Real Betis	3–0	Rayo Vallecano	Sevilla
	Finidi 30'; Pier 56'; Alfonso 71'			Stadium: Benito Villamarin; Attendance: 40,000

23 October 1996 9	Real Oviedo	1–1	Real Betis	Oviedo
	Manel 9'		Kowalczyk 27'	Stadium: Carlos Tartiere; Attendance: 11,700

26 October 1996 10	Real Betis	1–2	RCD Espanyol	Sevilla
	Pier 20'		Benitez 18'; Lardin 44' (pen.)	Stadium: Benito Villamarin; Attendance: 40,600

2 November 1996 11	Racing de Santander	1–1	Real Betis	Santander
	Correa 79' (pen.)		Sabas 90'	Stadium: El Sardinero; Attendance: 16,000

10 November 1996 12	Real Betis	2–1	Real Sociedad	Sevilla
	Alfonso 42'; Olías 66'		Luis Perez 25'	Stadium: Benito Villamarin; Attendance: 42,000

17 November 1996 13	Real Zaragoza	2–2	Real Betis	Zaragoza
	Dani 33'; Dani 81'		Alexis 48'; Alexis 86' (pen.)	Stadium: La Romareda; Referee: 20,000

24 November 1996 14	Real Betis	3–1	CD Tenerife	Sevilla
	Pier 60'; Finidi George 66'; Finidi George 89'		28' Chano	Stadium: Benito Villamarin

1 December 1996 15	SD Compostela	0–2	Real Betis	Santiago de Compostela
			7' Alfonso; 73'Finidi George	Stadium: San Lázaro; Attendance: 9,000

8 December 1996 16	Real Betis	5–1	CD Logroñés	Sevilla
	Vidakovic 18'; Pier 37'; Pier 71'; Roberto Rios 53'; Roberto Rios 67'		49' Clotet	Stadium: Benito Villamarin; Attendance: 40,000

22 December 1996 17	Sevilla FC	0–3	Real Betis	Sevilla
			39' (pen.)Alexis; 54'Alfonso; 55'Olias	Stadium: Sánchez Pizjuán; Attendance: 32,530

6 January 1997 18	Real Betis	1–1	Valencia CF	Sevilla
	Alexis 72' (pen.)	Report	80' Moya	Stadium: Benito Villamarin; Attendance: 35,000

19 January 1997 20	Real Betis	2–4	FC Barcelona	Sevilla
	Jarni 29'; Jarni 31'	Report	45' Luis Enrique; 62' Luis Enrique; 74'Ronaldo; 79' Luis Enrique	Stadium: Benito Villamarin; Attendance: 45,000

27 January 1997 21	Real Valladolid	1–3	Real Betis	Valladolid
	Victor 45'	Report	39' (pen.) Alexis; 51' Kowalczyk; 88' Kowalczyk	Stadium: José Zorrilla; Attendance: 15,000

2 February 1997 22	Athletic de Bilbao	0–3	Real Betis	Bilbao
		Report	4' Alfonso; 25' Olias; 72' Kowalczyk 72	Stadium: San Mamés; Attendance: 40,000

9 February 1997 23	Real Betis	3–1	CF Extremadura	Sevilla
	Alfonso 69'; Finidi 71'; Pier 83'	Report	Ramis 56'	Stadium: Benito Villamarin; Attendance: 35,000

15 February 1997 24	Real Madrid	2–2	Real Betis	Madrid
	Mijatović 19'; Panucci 53'	Report	6'Alfonso; 60'Finidi George	Stadium: Santiago Bernabéu; Attendance: 100,000

19 February 1997 25	Real Betis	1–1	RC Celta	Sevilla
	Alfonso 60'	Report	79' Mazinho	Stadium: Benito Villamarin; Attendance: 40,000

23 February 1997 26	Deportivo La Coruña	3–0	Real Betis	A Coruña
	Rivaldo 36'; Nando 39'; Rivaldo 59'	Report		Stadium: Riazor; Attendance: 22,000

2 March 1997 27	Real Betis	2–1	Hércules CF	Sevilla
	Alfonso 8'; Finidi 63'		Miljanovic 90'	Stadium: Benito Villamarin; Attendance: 30,000

6 March 1997 19	Sporting de Gijón	2–4	Real Betis	Gijón
	Lediakhov 6'; Tcheryshev 89'	Report	37' Alfonso; 46' Olias; 75' Kowalczyck; 88' Alfonso	Stadium: El Molinon; Attendance: 17,350

9 March 1997 28	Real Betis	3–2	Atlético de Madrid	Sevilla
	Alfonso 36'; Alfonso 53'; Alfonso 90'		29' Esnaider; Vidakovic 68' (own goal)	Stadium: Benito Villamarin; Attendance: 43,000

16 March 1997 29	Rayo Vallecano	0–4	Real Betis	Madrid
		Report	Alfonso 35'; Alfonso 55'; Alfonso 59' (pen.); Pier 73'	Stadium: Vallecas; Attendance: 10,000

22 March 1997 30	Real Betis	4–0	Real Oviedo	Sevilla
	Pier 21'; Alfonso 52'; Bjelica 88'; Finidi 90'	Report		Stadium: Benito Villamarin; Attendance: 40,000

30 March 1997 31	RCD Espanyol	0–0	Real Betis	Barcelona
		Report		Stadium: Sarrià; Attendance: 25,000

6 April 1997 32	Real Betis	2–2	Racing de Santander	Sevilla
	Alberto 6' (own goal); Alfonso 39'	Report	44' Merino; 88' Alberto	Stadium: Benito Villamarin; Attendance: 40,000

13 April 1997 33	Real Sociedad	0–1	Real Betis	San Sebastián
		Report	90' Josete	Stadium: Anoeta; Attendance: 22,000

16 April 1997 34	Real Betis	2–2	Real Zaragoza	Sevilla
	Alfonso 4'; Alfonso 28' (pen.)	Report	31' Nayim; 83' (pen.) Aragon	Stadium: Benito Villamarin; Attendance: 40,000

19 April 1997 35	CD Tenerife	0–1	Real Betis	Santa Cruz de Tenerife
			27' Jokanovic	Stadium: Heliodoro Rodríguez López; Attendance: 15,000

4 May 1997 36	Real Betis	0–0	SD Compostela	Sevilla
				Stadium: Benito Villamarin; Attendance: 45,000

11 May 1997 37	Logroñés	2–1	Real Betis	Logroño
	Ruben Sosa 27'; Bjelica 88'		64' Manel	Stadium: Las Gaunas; Attendance: 10,000

17 May 1997 38	Real Betis	3–3	Sevilla FC	Sevilla
	Jarni 8'; Jarni 47'; Cañas 88'		27' (pen.) Prosinecki; 90' Salva; 91' Galvan	Stadium: Benito Villamarin; Attendance: 44,000

26 May 1997 39	Valencia CF	1–1	Real Betis	Valencia
	Vlaovic 69'		9' Cañas	Stadium: Mestalla; Attendance: 40,000

31 May 1997 40	Real Betis	0–1	Sporting de Gijón	Sevilla
			55' Tcherysev	Stadium: Benito Villamarin; Attendance: 30,000

15 June 1997 41	FC Barcelona	3–0	Real Betis	Barcelona
	Oscar 44'; Stoichkov 75'; Luis Enrique 83'			Stadium: Camp Nou; Attendance: 70,000

21 June 1997 42	Real Betis	2–0	Real Valladolid	Barcelona
	Kowalczyk 11'; Finidi 74'			Stadium: Camp Nou

=== Copa del Rey ===
Second Round

6 November 1996	Écija Balompié	1–2	Real Betis	Écija
				Stadium: Estadio San Pablo

27 November 1996	Real Betis	2–0	Écija Balompié	Sevilla
				Stadium: Benito Villamarin

Third Round

8 January 1997	Granada CF	0–1	Real Betis	Granada
				Stadium: Los Cármenes

15 January 1997	Real Betis	3–0	Granada CF	Sevilla
				Stadium: Benito Villamarin

==== Eightfinals ====
30 January 1997	CD Tenerife	0–2	Real Betis	Santa Cruz de Tenerife
18:30 CET		Report (in Spanish)	Pier 41'; Kowalczyk 66'	Stadium: Heliodoro Rodríguez López; Attendance: 22,000; Referee: Esquinas Torres (Community of Madrid)

5 February 1997	Real Betis	3–0	CD Tenerife	Sevilla
21:30 CET	Merino 75'; Bjelica 87'; Cañas 88'	Report (in Spanish)		Stadium: Benito Villamarín; Attendance: 28,000; Referee: Daudén Ibáñez (Aragon)

==== Quarterfinals ====
26 February 1997	Real Betis	2–0	Rayo Vallecano	Seville
20:00 CET	Sabas 13' (pen.); Alfonso 81'	Report (in Spanish)		Stadium: Benito Villamarín; Attendance: 18,000; Referee: Iturralde González (Basque Country (autonomous community))

13 March 1997	Rayo Vallecano	1–2	Real Betis	Vallecas
22:00 CET	Guilherme 65'	Report (in Spanish)	Olías 28'; Cañas 90'	Stadium: Nuevo Estadio de Vallecas; Attendance: 4,000; Referee: Daudén Ibáñez (Aragon)

==== Semifinals ====
25 March 1997 1	Real Betis	1–0	Celta Vigo	Sevilla
21:30 CET	Bjelica 71'	Report (in Spanish)	Geli (yellow card) 82' (red card)	Stadium: Benito Villamarín; Attendance: 28,000; Referee: García-Aranda (Community of Madrid)

2 April 1997 2	Celta Vigo	1–1	Real Betis	Vigo
21:30 CET	Ratković 33' (red card) 62'	Report (in Spanish)	Alexis 87'; Ureña (red card) 62'	Stadium: Balaídos; Attendance: 33,000; Referee: Esquinas Torres (Community of Madrid)

==== Final ====
28 June 1997	Real Betis	2–3	FC Barcelona	Madrid
	Alfonso 11'; Nadj (yellow card) 14'; Alexis (yellow card) 26'; Jaime Quesada (yellow card) 77'; Finidi 82' (yellow card) 89'	Report	Figo (yellow card) 41' (goal) 45'; Ferrer (yellow card) 54'; De la Peña (yellow card) 72'; Pizzi 85'; Figo 114'	Stadium: Santiago Bernabéu; Attendance: 82,498; Referee: Ansuategui Roca

== Statistics ==
=== Player statistics ===
No.	Pos	Nat	Player	Total		La Liga		Copa del Rey	
No.	Pos	Nat	Player	Apps	Goals	Apps	Goals	Apps	Goals
13	GK	(Spain) ESP	Toni Prats	40	-45	40	-45	0	0
2	DF	(Spain) ESP	Jaime	33	0	19+5	0	8+1	0
21	DF	(Bosnia and Herzegovina) BIH	Risto Vidaković	35	6	30	1	5	5
14	DF	(Spain) ESP	Roberto Ríos	45	3	35+1	3	7+2	0
20	DF	(Spain) ESP	Tomás Olías	38	6	25+3	5	9+1	1
25	MF	(Nigeria) NGR	Finidi George	42	11	33+3	10	5+1	1
7	MF	(Spain) ESP	Alexis	45	7	38	6	7	1
6	MF	(Spain) ESP	Juan Merino	43	1	35+1	0	6+1	1
17	MF	(Croatia) CRO	Robert Jarni	42	5	34+2	5	5+1	0
11	FW	(Spain) ESP	Alfonso	51	27	40+1	25	7+3	2
15	FW	(Spain) ESP	Pier	42	11	26+8	9	6+2	2
1	GK	(Spain) ESP	Pedro Jaro	13	-7	2	-1	11	-6
12	MF	(Federal Republic of Yugoslavia) YUG	Albert Nađ	36	0	23+7	0	5+1	0
10	MF	(Spain) ESP	Cañas	43	5	19+13	2	9+2	3
16	FW	(Poland) POL	Wojciech Kowalczyk	30	8	14+12	6	3+1	2
18	MF	(Croatia) CRO	Nenad Bjelica	35	4	10+17	2	3+5	2
3	DF	(Spain) ESP	Luis Fernández	22	0	18	0	4	0
19	FW	(Spain) ESP	Juan Sabas	31	7	2+21	3	6+2	4
8	MF	(Spain) ESP	Luis Márquez	18	0	7+4	0	5+2	0
5	DF	(Spain) ESP	Josete	13	1	6+3	1	2+2	0
4	DF	(Spain) ESP	Juan Antonio Ureña	17	0	5+5	0	6+1	0
28	DF	(Spain) ESP	Fernando Varela	3	0	1+2	0		
27	MF	(Spain) ESP	Capi	2	0	0+2	0		
26	DF	(Spain) ESP	Juan Redondo	3	0	0+2	0	0+1	0
9	FW	(Federal Republic of Yugoslavia) YUG	Vlada Stosic	2	1	0	0	2	1

- Source: https://www.bdfutbol.com/en/t/t1996-978.html?tab=partits
