= 1997–98 Real Betis season =

Real Betis Balompíé
1997–98 season
- President: Manuel Ruiz de Lopera
- Manager: Luis Aragonés
- Stadium: Benito Villamarin
- La Liga: 8th (in UEFA Cup)
- Copa del Rey: Quarter-finals
- UEFA Cup Winners' Cup: Quarter-finals
- Top goalscorer: League: Alfonso (10); All: Alfonso (15)
Home colours	Away colours

During the 1997–98 season, Betis competed in La Liga, Copa del Rey and UEFA Cup Winners' Cup.

== Summary ==
In the summertime Llorenc Serra Ferrer left the club and signed with Barcelona prompting President Manuel Ruiz de Lopera to hire Luis Aragonés as its new manager. The club transferred in several players such as centre back Roberto Solozabal from Atlético Madrid, right back Jorge Otero from Valencia, midfielder Fernando from Real Valladolid, forward Oli from Real Oviedo and after a two-year stint in Barcelona striker Ángel Cuéllar got back to the squad.

The team finished in a disappointing eighth place in La Liga and reached barely the classification for the UEFA Cup next season. Meanwhile, the squad was eliminated in the Copa del Rey quarter-finals by Real Zaragoza, and defeated in two legs by Chelsea in the UEFA Cup Winners' Cup quarter-final stage.

== Squad ==
Squad at end of season

Note: Flags indicate national team as defined under FIFA eligibility rules; some limited exceptions apply. Players may hold more than one non-FIFA nationality.

No.	Pos.	Nation	Player
1	GK	ESP	Toni Prats
2	DF	ESP	Jaime
3	DF	ESP	Luis Fernández
4	DF	ESP	Juan Antonio Ureña
5	DF	ESP	Josete
6	DF	ESP	Juan Merino
7	MF	ESP	Alexis Trujillo
8	MF	ESP	Luis Márquez
9	FW	ESP	Oli
10	MF	ESP	Juan Cañas
11	FW	ESP	Alfonso
12	DF	YUG	Albert Nađ

No.	Pos.	Nation	Player
13	GK	ESP	Valerio
14	DF	ESP	Jorge Otero
17	DF	CRO	Robert Jarni
19	DF	ESP	Roberto Solozabal
20	DF	ESP	Tomás Olías
21	DF	BIH	Risto Vidaković
22	MF	ESP	Fernando
23	FW	ESP	Ángel Cuéllar
24	FW	ESP	Ivan Perez
25	MF	NGA	Finidi George
29	GK	ESP	José Manuel Pinto

=== Transfers ===
In
Pos.	Name	from	Type
DF	Roberto Solozabal	Atlético Madrid	
DF	Jorge Otero	Valencia	
MF	Fernando	Real Valladolid	
FW	Oli	Real Oviedo	
GK	Valerio	Albacete	
GK	Pinto	Betis B	
FW	Ángel Cuéllar	Barcelona	
FW	Ivan Perez	Extremadura	

Out
Pos.	Name	To	Type
DF	Roberto Ríos	Athletic Bilbao	
FW	Pier	Real Zaragoza	
GK	Pedro Jaro	Atlético Madrid	
DF	Fernando Varela	Betis B	
MF	Capi	Betis B	
DF	Juan Redondo	Hércules	
FW	Wojciech Kowalczyk	Las Palmas	
MF	Nenad Bjelica	Las Palmas	
FW	Juan Sabas	Mérida	

== Competitions ==
=== La Liga ===
==== League table ====
Pos	Team	Pld	W	D	L	GF	GA	GD	Pts	Qualification or relegation
6	Celta Vigo	38	17	9	12	54	47	+7	60 (Note: MLL: 9 pts; CEL: 5 pts; ATM: 2 pts)	Qualification for the UEFA Cup first round
7	Atlético Madrid	38	16	12	10	79	56	+23	60	Qualification for the UEFA Cup first round
8	Real Betis	38	17	8	13	49	50	−1	59	Qualification for the UEFA Cup first round
9	Valencia	38	16	7	15	58	52	+6	55	Qualification for the Intertoto Cup third round
10	Espanyol	38	12	17	9	44	31	+13	53	Qualification for the Intertoto Cup second round

Source: LFP
Rules for classification: 1) points; 2) head-to-head points; 3) head-to-head goal difference; 4) head-to-head goals scored; 5) goal difference; 6) number of goals scored.

==== Results by round ====
Round	1	2	3	4	5	6	7	8	9	10	11	12	13	14	15	16	17	18	19	20	21	22	23	24	25	26	27	28	29	30	31	32	33	34	35	36	37	38
Ground	A	H	A	H	A	H	A	H	H	A	H	A	H	A	H	A	A	H	A	H	A	H	A	H	H	A	A	H	A	H	A	H	H	A	H	A	H	A
Result	W	D	L	D	W	D	L	W	L	D	D	L	W	W	W	W	L	W	D	W	D	W	L	L	W	W	D	W	L	W	L	L	W	L	W	W	L	L
Position	2	6	12	14	7	9	9	8	9	10	10	12	11	10	7	7	8	9	8	7	7	6	6	6	7	7	6	7	6	5	6	7	7	8	7	6	6	8

Source: Competitive matches
A = Away; H = Home; W = Win; D = Draw; L = Loss; = Leader, 1998–99 UEFA Champions League Group stage; = 1998–99 UEFA Champions League Second qualifying round; = 1998–99 UEFA Cup First round; = Qualification for the Intertoto Cup third round; = Qualification for the Intertoto Cup second round; = 1998–99 Segunda División

==== Matches ====
1 September 1997 1	Real Valladolid	1-3	Real Betis	Valladolid
		Report		Stadium: José Zorrilla

6 September 1997 2	Real Betis	1-1	Athletic Bilbao	Seville
		Report		Stadium: Benito Villamarin

14 September 1997 3	Celta	2-0	Real Betis	Vigo
				Stadium: Balaídos

28 September 1997 4	Real Betis	1-1	Real Oviedo	Seville
				Stadium: Benito Villamarin

6 October 1997 5	Mérida	1-3	Real Betis	Mérida
				Stadium: Estadio Romano

15 October 1997 6	Real Betis	3-3	Real Zaragoza	Seville
		Report		Stadium: Benito Villamarin

19 October 1997 7	Espanyol	5-0	Real Betis	Barcelona
		Report		Stadium: Estadi Olímpic Lluís Companys

26 October 1997 8	Real Betis	1-0	Compostela	Seville
		Report		Stadium: Benito Villamarin

1 November 1997 9	Real Betis	2-3	Atlético Madrid	Seville
				Stadium: Benito Villamarin

9 November 1997 10	Salamanca	0-0	Real Betis	Villares de la Reina
				Stadium: El Helmántico

12 November 1997 11	Real Betis	0-0	Real Sociedad	Seville
		Report		Stadium: Benito Villamarin

16 November 1997 12	Valencia	1-0	Real Betis	Valencia
		Report		Stadium: Mestalla

23 November 1997 13	Real Betis	1-0	Deportivo La Coruña	Seville
		Report		Stadium: Benito Villamarin

29 November 1997 14	Sporting Gijón	2-3	Real Betis	Gijón
		Report		Stadium: El Molinón

7 December 1997 15	Real Betis	3-0	Tenerife	Seville
		Report		Stadium: Benito Villamarin

13 December 1997 16	Mallorca	1-2	Real Betis	Palma de Mallorca
				Stadium: Lluís Sitjar

21 December 1997 18	Racing Santander	2-0	Real Betis	Santander
		Report		Stadium: El Sardinero

3 January 1998 19	Real Betis	3-2	Real Madrid	Seville
		Report		Stadium: Benito Villamarin

18 January 1998 20	Athletic Bilbao	0-0	Real Betis	Bilbao
		Report		Stadium: San Mamés

25 January 1998 21	Real Betis	2-0	Celta	Seville
		Report		Stadium: Benito Villamarin

31 January 1998 23	Real Oviedo	0-0	Real Betis	Oviedo
		Report		Stadium: Carlos Tartiere

8 February 1998 24	Real Betis	2-1	Mérida	Seville
		Report		Stadium: Benito Villamarin

15 February 1998 25	Real Zaragoza	3-1	Real Betis	Zaragoza
		Report		Stadium: La Romareda

22 February 1998 26	Real Betis	1-3	Espanyol	Seville
				Stadium: Benito Villamarin

25 February 1998 20	Real Betis	3-0	Real Valladolid	Seville
		Report		Stadium: Benito Villamarin

28 February 1998 27	Compostela	2-3	Real Betis	Santiago de Compostela
				Stadium: San Lázaro

8 March 1998 28	Atlético Madrid	0-0	Real Betis	Madrid
		Report		Stadium: Vicente Calderón

15 March 1998 29	Real Betis	2-1	Salamanca	Seville
		Report		Stadium: Benito Villamarin

22 March 1998 30	Real Sociedad	2-0	Real Betis	San Sebastián
		Report		Stadium: Anoeta

28 March 1998 31	Real Betis	1-0	Valencia	Seville
		Report		Stadium: Benito Villamarin

4 April 1998 32	Deportivo La Coruña	2-0	Real Betis	La Coruña
		Report		Stadium: Riazor

7 April 1998 17	Real Betis	0-2	Barcelona	Seville
		Report		Stadium: Benito Villamarin

13 April 1998 33	Real Betis	2-1	Sporting Gijón	Seville
		Report		Stadium: Benito Villamarin

19 April 1998 34	Tenerife	3-1	Real Betis	Santa Cruz de Tenerife
		Report		Stadium: Heliodoro Rodríguez López

25 April 1998 35	Real Betis	2-1	Mallorca	Seville
		Report		Stadium: Benito Villamarin

3 May 1998 36	Barcelona	1-3	Real Betis	Barcelona
		Report		Stadium: Camp Nou

10 May 1998 37	Real Betis	0-2	Racing Santander	Seville
		Report		Stadium: Benito Villamarin

15 May 1998 38	Real Madrid	1-0	Real Betis	Madrid
		Report		Stadium: Santiago Bernabéu

=== Copa del Rey ===
==== Eightfinals ====
14 January 1998	Real Sociedad	0-2	Real Betis	San Sebastián
		Report		Stadium: Anoeta

21 January 1998	Real Betis	1-1	Real Sociedad	Seville
				Stadium: Benito Villamarín

==== Quarterfinals ====
4 February 1998	Real Zaragoza	3-0	Real Betis	Zaragoza
		Report		Stadium: La Romareda

12 February 1998	Real Betis	2–2 (2-5 agg.)	Zaragoza	Seville
21:30 CET	Alfonso 43'; Finidi 64'	Report (in Spanish)	Jamelli 15'; Pier 17'	Stadium: Benito Villamarín; Attendance: 30,000; Referee: Fernández Marín (Valencian Community)

=== UEFA Cup Winners' Cup ===
==== First round ====
18 September 1997 1	Real Betis (Spain)	2-0	(Hungary) BVSC Budapest	Seville
				Stadium: Benito Villamarin

2 October 1997 2	BVSC Budapest (Hungary)	0-2	(Spain) Real Betis	Budapest
				Stadium: Szőnyi úti Stadion

==== Eightfinals ====
23 October 1997 1	Real Betis (Spain)	2-0	(Denmark) Copenhagen	Seville
				Stadium: Benito Villamarin

6 November 1997 2	Copenhagen (Denmark)	1-1	(Spain) Real Betis	Copenhagen
				Stadium: Parken

==== Quarter-finals ====
5 March 1998	Real Betis (Spain)	1–2	(England) Chelsea	Seville
20:45	Alfonso 46'	Lineups	Flo 7', 12'	Stadium: Estadio Benito Villamarín; Attendance: 31,000; Referee: (Bulgaria) Atanas Uzunov

19 March 1998	Chelsea (England)	3–1 (5-2 agg.)	(Spain) Real Betis	London
19:45	Sinclair 30'; Di Matteo 50'; Zola 90'	Lineups	Finidi 20'	Stadium: Stamford Bridge; Attendance: 32,300; Referee: (Germany) Bernd Heynemann

== Statistics ==
=== Players statistics ===
No.	Pos	Nat	Player	Total		La Liga		Copa del Rey		Cup Winners' Cup	
No.	Pos	Nat	Player	Apps	Goals	Apps	Goals	Apps	Goals	Apps	Goals
1	GK	(Spain) ESP	Prats	45	-55	36	-44	3	-5	6	-6
6	DF	(Spain) ESP	Merino	38	0	28+2	0	1+2	0	5	0
20	DF	(Spain) ESP	Olias	32	1	26	1	3	0	3	0
19	DF	(Spain) ESP	Solozabal	35	0	24+2	0	4	0	5	0
25	MF	(Nigeria) NGA	Finidi	43	12	34	9	4	2	5	1
10	MF	(Spain) ESP	Cañas	35	3	19+8	2	3	0	4+1	1
7	MF	(Spain) ESP	Alexis	42	5	31+1	4	4	0	6	1
22	MF	(Spain) ESP	Fernando	38	2	22+9	2	1+2	0	4	0
17	MF	(Croatia) CRO	Jarni	37	6	28	6	3	0	6	0
9	FW	(Spain) ESP	Oli	45	11	29+6	9	4	1	4+2	1
11	FW	(Spain) ESP	Alfonso	41	15	30+1	10	4	1	6	4
13	GK	(Spain) ESP	Valerio	4	-5	2+1	-4	1	-1		
14	DF	(Spain) ESP	Otero	25	0	19+3	0	1	0	2	0
21	DF	(Bosnia and Herzegovina) BIH	Vidakovic	25	2	19	2	2	0	4	0
12	DF	(Federal Republic of Yugoslavia) YUG	Nadj	31	1	17+8	1	2+1	0	1+2	0
2	DF	(Spain) ESP	Jaime	23	0	15+4	0	2	0	0+2	0
8	MF	(Spain) ESP	Márquez	27	1	12+11	1	1+1	0	1+1	0
4	DF	(Spain) ESP	Ureña	19	1	10+5	0	1+1	0	2	1
23	FW	(Spain) ESP	Cuéllar	20	1	9+10	1	0	0	0+1	0
3	DF	(Spain) ESP	Fernández	17	0	6+7	0	0	0	1+3	0
24	FW	(Spain) ESP	Pérez	22	1	1+16	0	0+3	1	0+2	0
5	DF	(Spain) ESP	Josete	3	0	1+1	0	0	0	1	0
18	MF	(Croatia) CRO	Bjelica	5	0	0+3	0	0	0	0+2	0
29	GK	(Spain) ESP	Pinto	1	-2	0+1	-2	0	0		
19	FW	(Spain) ESP	Sabas								

- Source: https://www.bdfutbol.com/en/t/t1997-988.html
