= List of Real Betis seasons =

This is a list of seasons played by Real Betis in Spanish and European football, from 2006 to the most recent completed season.

== Key ==
Key to league record:

- Pos = Final position
- Pld = Matches played
- W = Matches won
- D = Matches drawn
- L = Matches lost
- GF = Goals for
- GA = Goals against
- Pts = Points

Key to rounds:

- W = Winners
- F = Final (Runners-up)
- SF = Semi-finals
- QF = Quarter-finals
- R16 = Round of 16
- R32 = Round of 32
- R64 = Round of 64
- KPO = Knockout round play-offs
- R5 = Fifth round
- R4 = Fourth round
- R3 = Third round
- R2 = Second round
- R1 = First round
- GS = Group stage

Champions	Runners-up	Promoted	Relegated	Pichichi

== Seasons ==
Seasons of Real Betis
Season	League									Cup	Other competitions		Top scorer(s)	
Season	Division	Pos	Pld	W	D	L	GF	GA	Pts	Cup	Other competitions		Player(s)	Goals
1989–90 Details	Segunda División	2nd	38	16	15	7	44	29	47	R16			(Spain) Pepe Mel	27
1990–91 Details	La Liga	20th	38	6	13	19	37	65	25	R16			(Spain) Pepe Mel	16
1991–92 Details	Segunda División	4th	38	18	10	10	54	43	46	R16			(Czech Republic) Michal Bílek	13
1992–93 Details	Segunda División	5th	38	16	11	11	49	33	43	5R			(Spain) Ángel Cuéllar	10
1993–94 Details	Segunda División	2nd	38	22	7	9	66	38	51	SF			(Argentina) Daniel Aquino	31
1994–95 Details	La Liga	3rd	38	15	16	7	46	25	46	R16			(Spain) Ángel Cuéllar	15
1995–96 Details	La Liga	8th	38	16	14	12	61	54	62	R16	UEFA Cup	R3	(Italy) Pier	16
1996–97 Details	La Liga	4th	38	21	14	7	81	46	77	RU			(Spain) Alfonso Pérez	27
1997–98 Details	La Liga	8th	38	17	8	13	49	50	59	QF	Cup Winners' Cup	QF	(Spain) Alfonso Pérez	15
1998–99 Details	La Liga	11th	38	14	7	17	47	58	49	R16	UEFA Cup	R3	(Nigeria) Finidi George	13
1999–2000 Details	La Liga	18th	38	11	9	18	33	56	42	R2			(Spain) Alfonso Pérez	10
2000–01 Details	Segunda División	2nd	42	21	12	9	49	32	75	R64			(Argentina) Gabriel Amato	16
2001–02 Details	La Liga	6th	38	15	14	9	42	34	59	R64			(Portugal) João Tomás	7
2002–03 Details	La Liga	8th	38	14	12	12	56	53	54	R16	UEFA Cup	R3	(Spain) Fernando	16
2003–04 Details	La Liga	9th	38	13	13	12	46	43	52	R16			(Spain) Joaquín	9
2004–05 Details	La Liga	4th	38	16	14	8	62	50	62	W			(Brazil) Ricardo Oliveira	26
2005–06 Details	La Liga	14th	38	10	12	16	34	51	42	QF	Supercopa de España Champions League UEFA Cup	RU GS R16	(Spain) Dani (Brazil) Robert	8
2006–07 Details	La Liga	16th	38	8	16	14	36	49	40	QF			(Brazil) Robert	9
2007–08 Details	La Liga	13th	38	12	11	15	45	51	47	R16			(Brazil) Edu	13
2008–09 Details	La Liga	18th	38	10	12	16	51	58	42	QF			(Cameroon) Achille Emaná	12
2009–10 Details	Segunda División	4th	42	19	14	9	61	38	71	R2			(Spain) Sergio García	12
2010–11 Details	Segunda División	1st	42	25	8	9	85	44	83	QF			(Spain) Rubén Castro	32
2011–12 Details	La Liga	13th	38	13	8	17	47	56	47	R32			(Spain) Rubén Castro	16
2012–13 Details	La Liga	7th	38	16	8	14	57	56	56	QF			(Spain) Rubén Castro	21
2013–14 Details	La Liga	20th	38	6	7	25	36	78	25	R16	Europa League	R16	(Spain) Rubén Castro	13
2014–15 Details	Segunda División	1st	42	25	9	8	73	40	84	R32			(Spain) Rubén Castro	33
2015–16 Details	La Liga	10th	38	11	12	15	34	52	45	R16			(Spain) Rubén Castro	19
2016–17 Details	La Liga	15th	38	10	9	19	41	64	39	R32			(Spain) Rubén Castro	13
2017–18 Details	La Liga	6th	38	18	6	14	60	61	60	R32			(Spain) Sergio León	13
2018–19 Details	La Liga	10th	38	14	8	16	44	52	50	SF	Europa League	R32	(Argentina) Giovani Lo Celso	16
2019–20 Details	La Liga	15th	38	10	11	17	48	60	41	R32			(Spain) Loren	12
2020–21 Details	La Liga	6th	38	17	10	11	50	50	61	QF			(Spain) Borja Iglesias	13
2021–22 Details	La Liga	5th	38	19	8	11	62	40	65	W	Europa League	R16	(Spain) Juanmi	20
2022–23 Details	La Liga	6th	38	17	9	12	46	41	60	R16	Supercopa de España Europa League	SF R16	(Spain) Borja Iglesias	15
2023–24 Details	La Liga	7th	38	14	15	9	48	45	57	R32	Europa League Conference League	GS KPO	(Brazil) Willian José	14
2024–25 Details	La Liga	6th	38	16	12	10	57	50	60	R16	Conference League	RU	(Spain) Isco	12
2025–26 Details	La Liga	5th	38	15	15	8	59	48	60	QF	Europa League	QF	(Morocco) Abde Ezzalzouli (Colombia) Cucho Hernández	15
