= 1997 Copa del Rey final =

Copa del Rey 1997 final
- Event: 1996–97 Copa del Rey
| Barcelona | Real Betis |
| 3 | 2 |
- Date: 28 June 1997
- Venue: Santiago Bernabéu, Madrid
- Referee: Ansuátegui Roca
- Attendance: 82,498

The 1997 Copa del Rey final was the 95th final of the Spanish cup competition, the Copa del Rey. The final was played at Santiago Bernabéu Stadium in Madrid on 28 June 1997. The match was won by Barcelona, who beat Real Betis 3–2.

== Details ==
28 June 1997
21:00 CET

| Barcelona | 3–2 (a.e.t.) | Real Betis |
|---|---|---|
| Figo 45', 115'; Pizzi 85' | Report | Alfonso 11'; Finidi 82' |

Santiago Bernabéu, Madrid
Attendance: 82,498
Referee: Ansuátegui Roca

| Barcelona | Real Betis |

| GK | 1 | (Portugal) Vítor Baía |
| RB | 2 | (Spain) Albert Ferrer | (yellow card) 54' | (substituted off) 84' |
| CB | 3 | (Spain) Abelardo |
| CB | 24 | (Portugal) Fernando Couto |
| LB | 12 | (Spain) Sergi |
| RM | 7 | (Portugal) Luís Figo | (yellow card) 41' |
| CM | 4 | (Spain) Pep Guardiola (c) |
| CM | 23 | (Spain) Iván de la Peña | (yellow card) 72' | (substituted off) 99' |
| LM | 21 | (Spain) Luis Enrique |
| RF | 8 | (Bulgaria) Hristo Stoichkov | | (substituted off) 66' |
| LF | 19 | (Spain) Juan Antonio Pizzi |
Substitutes:
| GK | 13 | (Spain) Carles Busquets |
| DF | 5 | (Romania) Gheorghe Popescu | | (substituted on) 99' |
| MF | 16 | (Spain) Óscar | | (substituted on) 84' |
| MF | 17 | (Nigeria) Emmanuel Amuneke | | (substituted on) 66' |
| MF | 18 | (Spain) Guillermo Amor |
Manager:
(England) Bobby Robson

| GK | 1 | (Spain) Pedro Jaro |
| RB | 2 | (Spain) Jaime | (yellow card) 77' |
| CB | 14 | (Spain) Roberto Ríos |
| CB | 21 | (Federal Republic of Yugoslavia) Risto Vidaković |
| LB | 6 | (Spain) Juan Merino | | (substituted off) 65' |
| RM | 25 | (Nigeria) Finidi George | (yellow card) 89' |
| CM | 10 | (Spain) Juan Cañas | | (substituted off) 71' |
| CM | 7 | (Spain) Alexis Trujillo (c) | (yellow card) 26' |
| CM | 12 | (Federal Republic of Yugoslavia) Albert Nađ | (yellow card) 14' | (substituted off) 85' |
| LM | 17 | (Croatia) Robert Jarni |
| FW | 11 | (Spain) Alfonso |
Substitutes:
| GK | 13 | (Spain) Toni Prats |
| DF | 4 | (Spain) Juan Antonio Ureña | | (substituted on) 65' |
| DF | 20 | (Spain) Tomás Olías | | (substituted on) 85' |
| MF | 18 | (Croatia) Nenad Bjelica |
| FW | 15 | (Spain) Pier | | (substituted on) 71' |
Manager:
(Spain) Lorenzo Serra Ferrer

MATCH RULES

- 90 minutes.
- 30 minutes of extra-time if necessary.
- Penalty shoot-out if scores still level.
- Five named substitutes.
- Maximum of three substitutions.
