= 2004–05 Real Betis season =

Real Betis
2004–05 season
- President: Manuel Ruiz de Lopera
- Head coach: Lorenzo Serra Ferrer
- La Liga: 4th
- Copa del Rey: Winners
- Top goalscorer: League: Ricardo Oliveira (22); All: Ricardo Oliveira (26)
Home colours	Away colours	Third colours

During the 2004–05 season, Betis competed in La Liga and the Copa del Rey. In the league, Betis finished fourth, qualifying for the UEFA Champions League for the first time in their history. The club also won the Copa del Rey, defeating Osasuna in the final on 11 June 2005.

== Squad ==
Squad at end of season

Note: Flags indicate national team as defined under FIFA eligibility rules; some limited exceptions apply. Players may hold more than one non-FIFA nationality.

No.	Pos.	Nation	Player
1	GK	ESP	Toni Prats
2	DF	ESP	Luis Fernández
3	DF	URU	Alejandro Lembo
4	DF	ESP	Juanito
5	DF	ESP	David Rivas
6	FW	ESP	Dani
7	DF	ESP	Fernando Varela
8	MF	ESP	Arzu
9	MF	ESP	Fernando Fernández
10	MF	ESP	Juan José Cañas
11	MF	BRA	Denílson
12	FW	BRA	Ricardo Oliveira
13	GK	ESP	Pedro Contreras
14	MF	ESP	Capi
15	MF	ESP	Jaime Pérez
17	MF	ESP	Joaquín

No.	Pos.	Nation	Player
18	DF	URU	Washington Tais
19	MF	ESP	Israel
20	MF	BRA	Marcos Assunção
21	FW	ESP	Alfonso Pérez
22	DF	ITA	Paolo Castellini
23	MF	ESP	Benjamín
24	FW	BRA	Edú
25	MF	ESP	Pablo Niño
26	GK	ESP	Pablo Vargas
27	DF	ESP	Melli
28	FW	ESP	Tati Maldonado
29	DF	ESP	David Llano
30	GK	ESP	Toni Doblas
31	FW	ESP	Rafael Cabello
32	DF	ESP	Óscar Tena
34	DF	ESP	Isidoro

=== Left club during season ===
Note: Flags indicate national team as defined under FIFA eligibility rules; some limited exceptions apply. Players may hold more than one non-FIFA nationality.

No.	Pos.	Nation	Player
16	MF	ESP	Ismael (on loan to Elche)
19	FW	ESP	Tote (on loan to Málaga)

No.	Pos.	Nation	Player
28	FW	ESP	Tati Maldonado (on loan to Ceuta)

== Competitions ==
=== La Liga ===
==== League table ====
Pos	Team	Pld	W	D	L	GF	GA	GD	Pts	Qualification or relegation
2	Real Madrid	38	25	5	8	71	32	+39	80	Qualification for the Champions League group stage
3	Villarreal	38	18	11	9	69	37	+32	65	Qualification for the Champions League third qualifying round
4	Real Betis	38	16	14	8	62	50	+12	62	Qualification for the Champions League third qualifying round
5	Espanyol	38	17	10	11	54	46	+8	61	Qualification for the UEFA Cup first round
6	Sevilla	38	17	9	12	44	41	+3	60	Qualification for the UEFA Cup first round

Source: LFP
Rules for classification: 1st points; 2nd head-to-head points; 3rd head-to-head goal difference; 4th head-to-head goals scored; 5th goal difference; 6th number of goals scored; 7th Fair-play points

==== Results by round ====
Round	1	2	3	4	5	6	7	8	9	10	11	12	13	14	15	16	17	18	19	20	21	22	23	24	25	26	27	28	29	30	31	32	33	34	35	36	37	38
Ground	A	H	A	H	A	H	H	A	H	A	H	A	H	A	H	A	H	A	H	H	A	H	A	H	A	A	H	A	H	A	H	A	H	A	H	A	H	A
Result	D	L	L	W	D	D	D	W	D	D	W	W	W	L	W	L	W	L	W	W	D	W	D	W	L	L	D	W	W	D	D	D	L	D	W	W	W	D
Position	7	17	17	12	12	14	14	13	13	14	11	10	5	7	6	7	6	6	6	6	7	6	5	3	5	7	7	4	3	4	5	5	7	7	6	5	4	4

Source: La Liga
A = Away; H = Home; W = Win; D = Draw; L = Loss

=== Copa del Rey ===
==== Quarter-finals ====
27 January 2005 First leg	Gramenet	2–2	Real Betis	Municipal de Santa Coloma, Santa Coloma de Gramenet
21:00 CEST	Juanito 21' (o.g.); Ollés 51'	(Report)	Fernando 15'; Assunção 74'	Referee: Bernardino González Vázquez

2 February 2005 Second leg	Real Betis	4–3 (6–5 agg.)	Gramenet	Estadio Manuel Ruiz de Lopera, Sevilla
21:00 CEST	Fernando 22'; Rivas 25'; Oliveira 57'; Assunção 85'	(Report)	Miki 52'; Rubén Blaya 67'; Aarón 87'	Referee: Alberto Undiano Mallenco

==== Semi-finals ====
21 April 2005 First leg	Real Betis	0–0	Athletic Bilbao	Estadio Manuel Ruiz de Lopera, Seville
21:00 CEST		(report)		Referee: Arturo Daudén Ibáñez

11 May 2005 Second leg	Athletic Bilbao	0–0 (0–0 agg.) (4–5 p)	Real Betis	Estadio San Mamés, Bilbao
21:00 CEST		(Report)		Referee: Carlos Megía Dávila
	Penalties
	Del Horno (penalty missed); Yeste (penalty scored); Tiko (penalty scored); Orbaiz (penalty scored); Iraola (penalty scored); Ezquerro (penalty missed)		(penalty scored) Assunção; (penalty missed) Oliveira; (penalty scored) Joaquín; (penalty scored) Denílson; (penalty scored) Lembo; (penalty scored) L. Fernández

==== Final ====
11 June 2005	Osasuna	1–2	Real Betis	Vicente Calderón, Madrid
21:00 CEST	Aloisi 82'	Report	Oliveira 74'; Dani 114'	Attendance: 55,000; Referee: Pérez Burrull (Cantabria)
