= 2000–01 Real Betis season =

Real Betis
2000–01 season
- President: Manuel Ruiz de Lopera
- Head coach: Fernando Vázquez (until 19 March); Luis del Sol (from 25 March)
- Stadium: Estadio Manuel Ruiz de Lopera
- Segunda División: 2nd
- Copa del Rey: Round of 64
- Top goalscorer: League: Gabriel Amato (16); All: Gabriel Amato (16)
Home colours	Away colours

The 2000–01 season was the 94th season in the existence of Real Betis and the club's first season back in the second division of Spanish football since 1994.

== Transfers ==
=== In ===
- David Belenguer Reverter from Extremadura
- Jesús Capitán Prada from Granada
- Francisco Javier Castaño Allende from Numancia
- Gabriel Amato from Rangers
- Joaquín from Real Betis B
- Gastón Casas
- José Fábio Alves de Azevedo
- Arturo García Muñoz from Real Betis B
- Víctor Manuel Torres Mestre from Alavés
- César de Loma Atienza from Mérida
- Michel Pavon from Bordeaux

== Competitions ==
=== Overall record ===
Competition	First match	Last match	Starting round	Final position	Record							
Competition	First match	Last match	Starting round	Final position	Pld	W	D	L	GF	GA	GD	Win %
Segunda División	3 September 2000	17 June 2001	Matchday 1	2nd	42	21	12	9	49	32	+17	50.00
Copa del Rey	13 December 2000		Round of 64	Round of 64	1	0	0	1	1	2	−1	0.00
Total					43	21	12	10	50	34	+16	48.84

Source: BDFutbol

=== Segunda División ===
==== League table ====
Pos	Team	Pld	W	D	L	GF	GA	GD	Pts	Promotion or relegation
1	Sevilla (C, P)	42	23	11	8	66	39	+27	80	Promotion to La Liga
2	Betis (P)	42	21	12	9	49	32	+17	75	Promotion to La Liga
3	Tenerife (P)	42	21	11	10	58	32	+26	74	Promotion to La Liga
4	Atlético Madrid	42	21	11	10	59	39	+20	74	
5	Albacete	42	18	12	12	46	40	+6	66	

Rules for classification: 1st points; 2nd head-to-head points; 3rd head-to-head goal difference; 4th head-to-head goals scored; 5th goal difference; 6th number of goals scored; 7th Fair-play points
(C) Champions; (P) Promoted

==== Results summary ====
Overall								Home						Away					
Pld	W	D	L	GF	GA	GD	Pts	W	D	L	GF	GA	GD	W	D	L	GF	GA	GD
42	21	12	9	49	32	+17	75	14	3	4	29	17	+12	7	9	5	20	15	+5

Source: BDFutbol

==== Results by round ====
Round	1	2	3	4	5	6	7	8	9	10	11	12	13	14	15	16	17	18	19	20	21	22	23	24	25	26	27	28	29	30	31	32	33	34	35	36	37	38	39	40	41	42
Ground	A	H	H	A	H	A	H	A	H	A	H	A	H	A	H	A	H	A	H	A	H	H	A	A	H	A	H	A	H	A	H	A	H	A	H	A	H	A	H	A	H	A
Result	D	L	W	D	D	L	W	W	W	D	W	L	L	W	W	D	W	W	W	D	W	W	D	W	D	L	D	D	L	L	W	W	W	D	W	D	L	W	W	L	W	W
Position	9	15	11	10	12	15	13	9	6	8	4	5	9	7	4	4	3	3	2	2	2	1	2	1	2	2	2	3	3	5	3	3	2	3	3	3	3	3	2	2	2	2

Source: BDFutbol
A = Away; H = Home; W = Win; D = Draw; L = Loss

==== Matches ====
3 September 2000 1	Compostela	0–0	Real Betis	Santiago de Compostela
				Stadium: Estadio Verónica Boquete de San Lázaro; Referee: Xavier Moreno Delgado

10 September 2000 2	Real Betis	1–2	Elche	Seville
	Gálvez 60'		Nano 3'; Şerban 7'	Stadium: Estadio Manuel Ruiz de Lopera; Referee: Bernardino González Vázquez

17 September 2000 3	Real Betis	2–1	Racing Ferrol	Seville
	Amato 20'; Merino 40'		Pazolo 57'	Stadium: Estadio Manuel Ruiz de Lopera; Referee: Xavier Moreno Delgado

24 September 2000 4	Badajoz	0–0	Real Betis	Badajoz
				Stadium: Nuevo Vivero; Referee: José Luis Renales Galindo

1 October 2000 5	Real Betis	1–1	Atlético Madrid	Seville
	Casas 44'		Correa 89' (pen.)	Stadium: Estadio Manuel Ruiz de Lopera; Referee: Fidel Valle Gil

7 October 2000 6	Córdoba	1–0	Real Betis	Córdoba
	Fernández 18' (o.g.)			Stadium: Nuevo Arcángel; Referee: Xabier Eleicegui Uranga

14 October 2000 7	Real Betis	2–0	Universidad de Las Palmas	Seville
	Amato 41'; Joaquín 69'			Stadium: Estadio Manuel Ruiz de Lopera; Referee: Jesús Téllez Sánchez

21 October 2000 8	Tenerife	0–1	Real Betis	Santa Cruz de Tenerife
			Benjamín 2'	Stadium: Heliodoro Rodríguez López; Referee: Antonio Jávega Jiménez

29 October 2000 9	Real Betis	1–0	Extremadura	Seville
	Filipescu 43'			Stadium: Estadio Manuel Ruiz de Lopera; Referee: Alexis Manuel Pérez Pérez

1 November 2000 10	Eibar	0–0	Real Betis	Eibar
				Stadium: Ipurua; Referee: José Luis Bello Rebolo

5 November 2000 11	Real Betis	2–1	Real Murcia	Seville
	Amato 12'; Benjamín 16'		Torres 27'	Stadium: Estadio Manuel Ruiz de Lopera; Referee: Antonio Rubinos Pérez

12 November 2000 12	Salamanca	1–0	Real Betis	Villares de la Reina
	Toedtli 82'			Stadium: Helmántico; Referee: Ignacio Fernández Hinojosa

19 November 2000 13	Real Betis	1–3	Sevilla	Seville
				Stadium: Estadio Manuel Ruiz de Lopera

25 November 2000 14	Lleida	0–1	Real Betis	Lleida
				Stadium: Camp d'Esports

3 December 2000 15	Real Betis	2–1	Leganés	Seville
				Stadium: Estadio Manuel Ruiz de Lopera

10 December 2000 16	Albacete	0–0	Real Betis	Albacete
				Stadium: Carlos Belmonte

17 December 2000 17	Real Betis	1–0	Sporting Gijón	Seville
				Stadium: Estadio Manuel Ruiz de Lopera

20 December 2000 18	Getafe	0–2	Real Betis	Getafe
				Stadium: Coliseum Alfonso Pérez

6 January 2001 19	Real Betis	1–0	Levante	Seville
				Stadium: Estadio Manuel Ruiz de Lopera

14 January 2001 20	Recreativo	1–1	Real Betis	Huelva
				Stadium: Estadio Nuevo Colombino

21 January 2001 21	Real Betis	1–0	Real Jaén	Seville
				Stadium: Estadio Manuel Ruiz de Lopera

27 January 2001 22	Real Betis	2–0	Compostela	Seville
				Stadium: Estadio Manuel Ruiz de Lopera

4 February 2001 23	Elche	1–1	Real Betis	Elche
				Stadium: Martínez Valero

11 February 2001 24	Racing Ferrol	0–1	Real Betis	Ferrol
				Stadium: A Malata

18 February 2001 25	Real Betis	1–1	Badajoz	Seville
				Stadium: Estadio Manuel Ruiz de Lopera

25 February 2001 26	Atlético Madrid	2–1	Real Betis	Madrid
				Stadium: Vicente Calderón

3 March 2001 27	Real Betis	1–1	Córdoba	Seville
				Stadium: Estadio Manuel Ruiz de Lopera

11 March 2001 28	Universidad de Las Palmas	1–1	Real Betis	Las Palmas
				Stadium: Municipal de Maspalomas

18 March 2001 29	Real Betis	0–2	Tenerife	Seville
				Stadium: Estadio Manuel Ruiz de Lopera

25 March 2001 30	Extremadura	1–0	Real Betis	Almendralejo
				Stadium: Estadio Francisco de la Hera

1 April 2001 31	Real Betis	1–0	Eibar	Seville
				Stadium: Estadio Manuel Ruiz de Lopera

8 April 2001 32	Real Murcia	1–3	Real Betis	Murcia
				Stadium: Estadio Nueva Condomina

15 April 2001 33	Real Betis	2–1	Salamanca	Seville
				Stadium: Estadio Manuel Ruiz de Lopera

22 April 2001 34	Sevilla	1–1	Real Betis	Seville
				Stadium: Ramón Sánchez Pizjuán

28 April 2001 35	Real Betis	4–1	Lleida	Seville
				Stadium: Estadio Manuel Ruiz de Lopera

6 May 2001 36	Leganés	1–1	Real Betis	Leganés
				Stadium: Estadio Municipal de Butarque

13 May 2001 37	Real Betis	1–2	Albacete	Seville
				Stadium: Estadio Manuel Ruiz de Lopera

19 May 2001 38	Sporting Gijón	1–2	Real Betis	Gijón
				Stadium: El Molinón

27 May 2001 39	Real Betis	1–0	Getafe	Seville
				Stadium: Estadio Manuel Ruiz de Lopera

2 June 2001 40	Levante	3–2	Real Betis	Valencia
				Stadium: Ciutat de València

10 June 2001 41	Real Betis	1–0	Recreativo	Seville
				Stadium: Estadio Manuel Ruiz de Lopera

17 June 2001 42	Real Jaén	0–2	Real Betis	Jaén
				Stadium: La Victoria

=== Copa del Rey ===
13 December 2000 Round of 64	Real Jaén	2–1 (a.e.t.)	Real Betis	Jaén
				Stadium: Nuevo Estadio de La Victoria

== Statistics ==
=== Goalscorers ===
Rank	Pos.	No.	Player	La Liga	Copa del Rey	Total
1	FW	9	(Argentina) Gabriel Amato	16	0	16
2	FW	19	(Argentina) Gastón Casas	11	0	11
3	FW	20	(Spain) Ángel Cuéllar	4	1	5
4	FW	27	(Spain) Joaquín	3	0	3
4	FW	22	(Spain) Pepe Gálvez	3	0	3
Total				49	1	50
