= Narón BP =

Spanish football club

Narón
- logo
- Full name: Narón Balompé Piñeiros
- Founded: 1996
- Dissolved: 2015
- Ground: Estadio Río Seco, Narón, Galicia, Spain
- Capacity: 1,000
- President: (Spain) Emilio Gómez
- Head coach: (Spain) Luis Santiago
- 2014–15: Primeira Autonómica – Group 1, 15th of 18
Home colours	Away colours

Narón Balompé Piñeiros was a Spanish football team based in Narón, in the autonomous community of Galicia. Founded in 1996 and dissolved in 2015, it last played in Primeira Autonómica – Group 1, holding home games at Estadio Río Seco, which has a capacity of 1,000 spectators.

== History ==
Narón was founded in 1996 after a merger of the two most important teams in the city, Unión Deportiva Piñeiros (founded in 1963) and Fútbol Sala Narón (founded in 1985). It first reached the fourth division in 2003–04.

Narón spent eight consecutive seasons in the fourth category before being relegated in 2011. It competed in the promotion playoffs in 2007–08, being ousted by Antequera CF in the first round (1–4 on aggregate).

In August 2015, Narón was dissolved after suffering relegation to the Segunda Autonómica; two months earlier, CD Narón was created to take its place.

== Season to season ==
Season	Tier	Division	Place	Copa del Rey
1996–97	7	2ª Reg.	1st	
1997–98	6	1ª Reg.	12th	
1998–99	6	1ª Reg.	14th	
1999–2000	6	1ª Reg.	12th	
2000–01	6	1ª Reg.	5th	
2001–02	6	1ª Reg.	1st	
2002–03	5	Reg. Pref.	1st	
2003–04	4	3ª	17th	
2004–05	4	3ª	9th	
2005–06	4	3ª	8th	

Season	Tier	Division	Place	Copa del Rey
2006–07	4	3ª	10th	
2007–08	4	3ª	3rd	
2008–09	4	3ª	5th	
2009–10	4	3ª	5th	
2010–11	4	3ª	18th	
2011–12	5	Pref. Aut.	2nd	
2012–13	4	3ª	20th	
2013–14	5	Pref. Aut.	19th	
2014–15	6	1ª Aut.	15th	

- 9 seasons in Tercera División

== Famous players ==
Note: this list contains players that have played at least 100 league games and/or have reached international status.

- (Spain) Ángel Cuéllar
