= Pablo Niño =

Spanish footballer

Personal information
- Full name: Juan Pablo Niño Castellano
- Date of birth: 15 May 1978 (age 48)
- Place of birth: Rota, Spain
- Height: 1.76 m (5 ft 9 in)
- Position: Winger

Youth career
- Betis

Senior career*
Years	Team	Apps	(Gls)
1997–2004	Betis B	108	(9)
2000–2001	→ Recreativo (loan)	16	(0)
2001–2002	→ Cádiz (loan)	23	(2)
2003–2004	→ Roosendaal (loan)	30	(0)
2004–2006	Betis	6	(0)
2006	→ Numancia (loan)	13	(1)
2006–2007	Mérida	31	(1)
2007–2008	Pozoblanco	30	(4)
2008–2009	Puerto Real	29	(1)
2009–2010	Linense	28	(1)
2010–2014	Rota		
2014–2018	Roteña		
Total		314	(19)
- * Club domestic league appearances and goals

Juan Pablo Niño Castellano (born 15 May 1978) is a Spanish retired footballer who played as a left winger.

== Club career ==
Born in Rota, Cádiz, Andalusia, Niño graduated from local Real Betis' youth system, making his debut with the reserves in the 1997–98 season, in Segunda División B. In the summer of 2000 he was loaned to Recreativo de Huelva of Segunda División, playing his first match as a professional on 3 September by coming on as a second-half substitute in a 0–0 home draw against CD Badajoz.

Niño appeared in 16 games during the campaign, starting in only one however. In July 2001 he moved to third-level club Cádiz CF also in a temporary deal, featuring regularly and being loaned to Eredivisie side RBC Roosendaal in July 2003.

In August 2004, profiting from Denílson's injury, Niño was promoted to the first team in La Liga. He made his debut in the competition on 16 October, replacing Edu in a 1–1 home draw to Real Madrid.

In December 2005, after being rarely used, Niño joined CD Numancia on loan for the remainder of the season. On 4 August of the following year, he terminated his contract with Betis and signed for Mérida UD in the third tier.

Niño moved to Tercera División's CD Pozoblanco in 2007, and went on to spend the rest of his career in the lower leagues and amateur football, representing Puerto Real CF, Real Balompédica Linense and CD Rota.

== Honours ==
Betis

- Copa del Rey: 2004–05
