= 1996–97 Copa del Rey =

95th Copa del Rey

Tournament details
- Country: Spain
- Teams: 72

Final positions
- Champions: Barcelona
- Runners-up: Real Betis

Tournament statistics
- Matches played: 139
- Goals scored: 330 (2.37 per match)
- Top goal scorer: (Argentina) Klimowicz (7)

The 1996–97 Copa del Rey was the 95th staging of the Copa del Rey.

The competition started on 4 September 1996 and concluded on 28 June 1997 with the final, held at the Santiago Bernabéu Stadium in Madrid.

== First round ==
First round
Home 1st leg	Agg.	Home 2nd leg	1st leg			2nd leg			Notes
Cultural Leonesa	0–3	Alavés	4 September 1996	0–1	Rep.	18 September 1996	2–0	Rep.	
Gernika	2–6	Eibar	4 September 1996	2–2	Rep.	18 September 1996	4–0	Rep.	
Gimnàstic Tarragona	2–6	Lleida	4 September 1996	0–2	Rep.	18 September 1996	4–2	Rep.	
Cacereño	2–7	Mérida	4 September 1996	1–5	Rep.	18 September 1996	2–1	Rep.	
Manchego	1–2	Salamanca	4 September 1996	0–0	Rep.	18 September 1996	2–1	Rep.	
Lliria	1–5	Villarreal	4 September 1996	0–3	Rep.	18 September 1996	2–1	Rep.	
Mensajero	0–2	Almería	4 September 1996	0–1	Rep.	19 September 1996	1–0	Rep.	
Racing Ferrol	2–1	Ourense	5 September 1996	1–1	Rep.	19 September 1996	0–1	Rep.	
Real Avilés Industrial	6–1	Marino de Luanco	5 September 1996	3–1	Rep.	19 September 1996	0–3	Rep.	
Gimnástica Torrelavega	0–3	Osasuna	5 September 1996	0–1	Rep.	19 September 1996	2–0	Rep.	
Barakaldo	2–2 (a)	Real Unión	5 September 1996	1–2	Rep.	18 September 1996	0–1	Rep.	
Talavera	3–2	Badajoz	5 September 1996	0–1	Rep.	19 September 1996	1–3	Rep.	
Carabanchel	1–4	Leganés	5 September 1996	1–2	Rep.	19 September 1996	2–0	Rep.	
Getafe	2–2 (a)	Toledo	5 September 1996	2–2	Rep.	18 September 1996	0–0	Rep.	
Gandía	3–9	Mallorca	5 September 1996	1–4	Rep.	19 September 1996	5–2	Rep.	
Real Murcia	1–3	Albacete	5 September 1996	1–1	Rep.	19 September 1996	2–0	Rep.	
Elche	0–1	Mar Menor	5 September 1996	0–0	Rep.	19 September 1996	1–0	Rep.	
Real Jaén	1–4	Las Palmas	5 September 1996	0–1	Rep.	19 September 1996	3–1	Rep.	
Marbella	2–4	Écija	5 September 1996	1–2	Rep.	18 September 1996	2–1	Rep.	
Málaga	1–0	Realejos	5 September 1996	1–0	Rep.	19 September 1996	0–0	Rep.	
Guadix	0–1	Granada	5 September 1996	0–1	Rep.	19 September 1996	0–0	Rep.	
Córdoba	1–2	Polideportivo Ejido	5 September 1996	0–1	Rep.	19 September 1996	1–1	Rep.	
Castellón	1–6	Levante	5 September 1996	0–3	Rep.	18 September 1996	3–1	Rep.	
Terrassa	2–0	Figueres	11 September 1996	1–0	Rep.	19 September 1996	0–1	Rep.	
Bye: Zalla, its opponent (Sestao) retired of the competition.

== Second round ==
Second round
Home 1st leg	Agg.	Home 2nd leg	1st leg			2nd leg			Notes
Osasuna	2–1	Real Sociedad	5 November 1996	1–0	Rep.	27 November 1996	1–1	Rep.	
Racing Ferrol	2–4	Celta Vigo	6 November 1996	1–3	Rep.	26 November 1996	1–1	Rep.	
Real Avilés	1–8	Real Oviedo	6 November 1996	1–5	Rep.	27 November 1996	3–0	Rep.	
Zalla	1–5	Athletic Bilbao	6 November 1996	0–3	Rep.	27 November 1996	2–1	Rep.	
Eibar	1–1 (a)	Racing Santander	6 November 1996	1–1	Rep.	27 November 1996	0–0	Rep.	
Alavés	1–1 (a)	Logroñés	6 November 1996	1–1	Rep.	27 November 1996	0–0	Rep.	
Real Unión	1–6	Real Zaragoza	6 November 1996	0–4	Rep.	27 November 1996	2–1	Rep.	
Albacete	1–5	Rayo Vallecano	6 November 1996	0–0	Rep.	27 November 1996	5–1	Rep.	
Leganés	1–2	Compostela	6 November 1996	1–1	Rep.	27 November 1996	1–0	Rep.	
Salamanca	0–4	Real Madrid	6 November 1996	0–2	Rep.	27 November 1996	2–0	Rep.	
Talavera	1–4	Real Valladolid	6 November 1996	0–3	Rep.	27 November 1996	1–1	Rep.	
Mallorca	1–3	Deportivo La Coruña	6 November 1996	1–0	Rep.	27 November 1996	3–0	Rep.	
Mérida	2–5	Extremadura	6 November 1996	1–0	Rep.	27 November 1996	5–1	Rep.	
Málaga	0–1	Sevilla	6 November 1996	0–1	Rep.	27 November 1996	0–0	Rep.	
Écija	1–4	Real Betis	6 November 1996	2–1	Rep.	27 November 1996	2–0	Rep.	
Polideportivo Ejido	0–0 (p)	Granada	6 November 1996	0–0	Rep.	27 November 1996	0–0	Rep.	Penalties: 4–3 for Granada CF
Las Palmas	5–2	Almería	6 November 1996	2–0	Rep.	27 November 1996	2–3	Rep.	
Terrassa	1–2	Lleida	6 November 1996	1–0	Rep.	27 November 1996	2–0	Rep.	
Levante	1–2	Hércules	6 November 1996	1–0	Rep.	27 November 1996	2–0	Rep.	
Mar Menor	0–3	Villarreal	6 November 1996	0–1	Rep.	27 November 1996	2–0	Rep.	
Toledo	0–1	Sporting de Gijón	7 November 1996	0–0	Rep.	26 November 1996	1–0	Rep.	

== Third round ==
Third round
Home 1st leg	Agg.	Home 2nd leg	1st leg			2nd leg			Notes
Sevilla	2–2 (p)	Deportivo La Coruña	8 January 1997	2–0	Rep.	16 January 1997	2–0	Rep.	Penalties: 3–1 for Deportivo de La Coruña
Espanyol	6–3	Sporting de Gijón	8 January 1997	4–1	Rep.	15 January 1997	2–2	Rep.	
Real Oviedo	1–3	Compostela	8 January 1997	1–0	Rep.	15 January 1997	3–0	Rep.	
Granada	0–4	Real Betis	8 January 1997	0–1	Rep.	15 January 1997	3–0	Rep.	
Osasuna	4–5	Rayo Vallecano	8 January 1997	3–2	Rep.	15 January 1997	3–1	Rep.	
Real Zaragoza	1–2	Racing Santander	8 January 1997	1–1	Rep.	15 January 1997	1–0	Rep.	
Villarreal	2–3	Athletic Bilbao	8 January 1997	0–1	Rep.	15 January 1997	2–2	Rep.	
Celta Vigo	4–2	Logroñés	8 January 1997	2–0	Rep.	15 January 1997	2–2	Rep.	
Real Madrid	4–1	Real Valladolid	9 January 1997	2–1	Rep.	15 January 1997	0–2	Rep.	
Lleida	2–2 (a)	Hércules	16 January 1997	1–0	Rep.	22 January 1997	2–1	Rep.	Match suspended at the original date.
Bye: Las Palmas, Extremadura.

== Bracket ==
First round
1	(Canary Islands) Las Palmas (5–3 p)	0	2	2
16	(Valencian Community) Valencia	2	0	2
8	(Galicia (Spain)) Deportivo La Coruña	2	0	2
9	(Catalonia) Espanyol (a)	2	0	2
5	(Community of Madrid) Atlético Madrid	2	3	5
12	(Galicia (Spain)) Compostela	0	2	2
4	(Catalonia) Barcelona	3	1	4
13	(Community of Madrid) Real Madrid	2	1	3
6	(Canary Islands) Tenerife	0	0	0
11	(Andalusia) Real Betis	2	3	5
3	(Community of Madrid) Rayo Vallecano	2	2	4
14	Extremadura	2	1	3
7	(Cantabria) Racing Santander	1	1	2
10	(Basque Country (autonomous community)) Athletic Bilbao	0	1	1
2	(Catalonia) Lleida	1	0	1
15	(Galicia (Spain)) Celta Vigo (a)	1	0	1

Quarter-finals
(Canary Islands) Las Palmas (a)	0	1	1
(Catalonia) Espanyol	0	1	1
(Community of Madrid) Atlético Madrid	2	4	6
(Catalonia) Barcelona	2	5	7
(Andalusia) Real Betis	2	2	4
(Community of Madrid) Rayo Vallecano	0	1	1
(Cantabria) Racing Santander	1	0	1
(Galicia (Spain)) Celta Vigo	2	1	3

Semi-finals
(Canary Islands) Las Palmas	0	0	0
(Catalonia) Barcelona	4	3	7
(Andalusia) Real Betis	1	1	2
(Galicia (Spain)) Celta Vigo	0	1	1

Final
(Catalonia) Barcelona	3
(Andalusia) Real Betis	2

== Round of 16 ==
Team 1	Agg.	Team 2	1st leg	2nd leg
Las Palmas (Canary Islands)	2–2 (5–3 p)	(Valencian Community) Valencia	0–2	2–0
Deportivo La Coruña (Galicia (Spain))	2–2 (a)	(Catalonia) Espanyol	2–2	0–0
Atlético Madrid (Community of Madrid)	5–2	(Galicia (Spain)) Compostela	2–0	3–2
Barcelona (Catalonia)	4–3	(Community of Madrid) Real Madrid	3–2	1–1
Tenerife (Canary Islands)	0–5	(Andalusia) Real Betis	0–2	0–3
Rayo Vallecano (Community of Madrid)	4–3	Extremadura	2–2	1–1
Racing Santander (Cantabria)	2–1	(Basque Country (autonomous community)) Athletic Bilbao	1–0	1–1
Lleida (Catalonia)	1–1 (a)	(Galicia (Spain)) Celta Vigo	1–1	0–0

=== First leg ===
28 January 1997	Deportivo La Coruña	2–2	Espanyol	A Coruña
21:30 CET	Maikel 81'; Rivaldo 82'	Report (in Spanish)	Benítez 42'; Răducioiu 58'	Stadium: Riazor; Attendance: 16,800; Referee: Nuñez Manrique (Community of Madrid)

29 January 1997	Racing Santander	1–0	Athletic Bilbao	Santander
21:00 CET	Arpón 89'; Merino (yellow card) 83' (red card)	Report (in Spanish)		Stadium: El Sardinero; Attendance: 13,000; Referee: Megía Dávila (Community of Madrid)

29 January 1997	Lleida	1–1	Celta Vigo	Lleida
21:00 CET	Julio Rodríguez 33'	Report (in Spanish)	Prieto 88'	Stadium: Camp d'Esports; Attendance: 3,500; Referee: Mejuto González (Asturias)

29 January 1997	Rayo Vallecano	2–2	Extremadura	Madrid
21:00 CET	Guilherme 23'; Klimowicz 31'; José María (red card) 68'	Report (in Spanish)	Silvani 41'; Pineda 58'	Stadium: La Peineta; Attendance: 1,000; Referee: Gracia Redondo (Aragon)

29 January 1997	Atlético Madrid	2–0	Compostela	Madrid
21:00 CET	Toni 8'; Kiko 90'	Report (in Spanish)	Lekumberri (yellow card) 71' (red card)	Stadium: Vicente Calderón; Attendance: 15,000; Referee: Carmona Méndez (Extremadura)

29 January 1997	Las Palmas	0–2	Valencia	Las Palmas de Gran Canaria
22:00 CET		Report (in Spanish)	Leandro 41' 66'; Camarasa (red card) 44'	Stadium: Insular; Attendance: 19,000; Referee: García-Aranda (Community of Madrid)

30 January 1997	Tenerife	0–2	Real Betis	Santa Cruz de Tenerife
18:30 CET		Report (in Spanish)	Pier 41'; Kowalczyk 66'	Stadium: Heliodoro Rodríguez López; Attendance: 22,000; Referee: Esquinas Torres (Community of Madrid)

30 January 1997	Barcelona	3–2	Real Madrid	Barcelona
21:30 CET	Ronaldo 13'; Nadal 70'; Giovanni 78'	Report (in Spanish)	Šuker 16'; Hierro 67'	Stadium: Camp Nou; Attendance: 95,000; Referee: López Nieto (Andalusia)

=== Second leg ===
4 February 1997	Compostela	2–3	Atlético Madrid	Santiago de Compostela
20:30 CET	Penev 17' (pen.), 45'	Report (in Spanish)	López 6'; Kiko 10'; Biagini 19'	Stadium: Multiusos de San Lázaro; Attendance: 5,000; Referee: Losantos Omar (Basque Country (autonomous community))

5 February 1997	Athletic Bilbao	1–1	Racing Santander	Bilbao
20:15 CET	Urzaiz 82', (red card) 90'	Report (in Spanish)	Txema 31'; Sánchez Jara (yellow card) 74' (red card); Correa (yellow card) 81' (red card)	Stadium: San Mamés; Attendance: 42,000; Referee: Fernández Marín (Valencian Community)

5 February 1997	Espanyol	0–0	Deportivo La Coruña	Barcelona
20:45 CET	Olmeta (red card) 42'	Report (in Spanish)		Stadium: Sarrià; Attendance: 16,000; Referee: Prados García (Andalusia)

5 February 1997	Celta Vigo	0–0	Lleida	Vigo
21:00 CET		Report (in Spanish)		Stadium: Balaídos; Attendance: 9,000; Referee: Iturralde González (Basque Country (autonomous community))

5 February 1997	Valencia	0–2 (a.e.t.) (3–5 p)	Las Palmas	Valencia
21:15 CET		Report (in Spanish)	Paquito 32'; Orlando 50'; Asier (yellow card) 115' (red card)	Stadium: Mestalla; Attendance: 35,000; Referee: Hernanz Angulo (Galicia (Spain))
	Penalties
	Leandro (penalty scored); Cáceres (penalty missed); Iván Campo (penalty scored); Karpin (penalty scored)		(penalty scored) Valerón; (penalty scored) Paquito; (penalty scored) Turu Flores; (penalty scored) Víctor; (penalty scored) Simionato

5 February 1997	Real Betis	3–0	Tenerife	Sevilla
21:30 CET	Merino 75'; Bjelica 87'; Cañas 88'	Report (in Spanish)		Stadium: Benito Villamarín; Attendance: 28,000; Referee: Daudén Ibáñez (Aragon)

6 February 1997	Extremadura	1–2	Rayo Vallecano	Almendralejo
19:30 CET	Silvani 1'	Report (in Spanish)	Guilherme 50'; Klimowicz 90' (pen.)	Stadium: Francisco de la Hera; Attendance: 9,000; Referee: Andradas Asurmendi (Navarre)

6 February 1997	Real Madrid	1–1	Barcelona	Madrid
21:00 CET	Šuker 79' (pen.)	Report (in Spanish)	Roberto Carlos 69' (o.g.)	Stadium: Santiago Bernabéu; Attendance: 110,000; Referee: Díaz Vega (Asturias)

== Quarter-finals ==
Team 1	Agg.	Team 2	1st leg	2nd leg
Las Palmas (Canary Islands)	1–1 (a)	(Catalonia) Espanyol	0–0	1–1
Atlético Madrid (Community of Madrid)	6–7	(Catalonia) Barcelona	2–2	4–5
Real Betis (Andalusia)	4–1	(Community of Madrid) Rayo Vallecano	2–0	2–1
Racing Santander (Cantabria)	1–3	(Galicia (Spain)) Celta Vigo	1–2	0–1

=== First leg ===
26 February 1997	Real Betis	2–0	Rayo Vallecano	Seville
20:00 CET	Sabas 13' (pen.); Alfonso 81'	Report (in Spanish)		Stadium: Benito Villamarín; Attendance: 18,000; Referee: Iturralde González (Basque Country (autonomous community))

26 February 1997	Atlético Madrid	2–2	Barcelona	Madrid
22:00 CET	Caminero 19'; Kiko 72'	Report (in Spanish)	Pizzi 43' (pen.), 64'	Stadium: Vicente Calderón; Attendance: 45,000; Referee: Mejuto González (Asturias)

27 February 1997	Las Palmas	0–0	Espanyol	Las Palmas de Gran Canaria
19:30 CET		Report (in Spanish)		Stadium: Insular; Attendance: 15,000; Referee: Ansuátegui Roca (Valencian Community)

27 February 1997	Racing Santander	1–2	Celta Vigo	Santander
21:30 CET	Javi López 66'	Report (in Spanish)	Mostovoi 44'; Revivo 74'; Josema (yellow card) 81' (red card)	Stadium: El Sardinero; Attendance: 18,000; Referee: Díaz Vega (Asturias)

=== Second leg ===
12 March 1997	Espanyol	1–1	Las Palmas	Barcelona
19:30 CET	Ouédec 43'	Report (in Spanish)	Turu Flores 47'	Stadium: Sarrià; Attendance: 8,300; Referee: López Nieto (Andalusia)

12 March 1997	Barcelona	5–4	Atlético Madrid	Barcelona
21:30 CET	Ronaldo 47', 51', 72'; Figo 67'; Pizzi 81'	Report (in Spanish)	Pantić 8', 28', 31' (pen.), 52'	Stadium: Camp Nou; Attendance: 90,000; Referee: Gracia Redondo (Aragon)

13 March 1997	Celta Vigo	1–0	Racing Santander	Vigo
20:00 CET	Ratković 80', (yellow card) 86' (red card)	Report (in Spanish)	Correa (yellow card) 90+5' (red card)	Stadium: Balaídos; Attendance: 20,000; Referee: Fernández Marín (Valencian Community)

13 March 1997	Rayo Vallecano	1–2	Real Betis	Vallecas
22:00 CET	Guilherme 65'	Report (in Spanish)	Olías 28'; Cañas 90'	Stadium: Nuevo Estadio de Vallecas; Attendance: 4,000; Referee: Daudén Ibáñez (Aragon)

== Semi-finals ==
Team 1	Agg.	Team 2	1st leg	2nd leg
Las Palmas (Canary Islands)	0–7	(Catalonia) Barcelona	0–4	0-3
Real Betis (Andalusia)	2–1	(Galicia (Spain)) Celta Vigo	1–0	1–1

=== First leg ===
25 March 1997	Real Betis	1–0	Celta Vigo	Sevilla
21:30 CET	Bjelica 71'	Report (in Spanish)	Geli (yellow card) 82' (red card)	Stadium: Benito Villamarín; Attendance: 28,000; Referee: García-Aranda (Community of Madrid)

26 March 1997	Las Palmas	0–4	Barcelona	Las Palmas
22:00 CET		Report (in Spanish)	Ronaldo 44' (pen.), 77'; Pizzi 56'; De la Peña 75'	Stadium: Insular; Attendance: 23,000; Referee: Díaz Vega (Asturias)

=== Second leg ===
2 April 1997	Celta Vigo	1–1	Real Betis	Vigo
21:30 CET	Ratković 33' (red card) 62'	Report (in Spanish)	Alexis 87'; Ureña (red card) 62'	Stadium: Balaídos; Attendance: 33,000; Referee: Esquinas Torres (Community of Madrid)

3 April 1997	Barcelona	3–0	Las Palmas	Barcelona
21:30 CET	Óscar 14'; Luis Enrique 28'; Couto 65'	Report (in Spanish)		Stadium: Camp Nou; Attendance: 35,000; Referee: Ansuátegui Roca (Valencian Community)

== Final ==
28 June 1997
21:00 CET

Barcelona	3–2 (a.e.t.)	Real Betis
Figo 45', 114'; Pizzi 85'	Report (in Spanish)	Alfonso 11'; Finidi 82'

Madrid
Stadium: Santiago Bernabéu
Attendance: 82,498
Referee: Ansuátegui Roca (Valencian Community)

Copa del Rey
1996–97 winners
Barcelona
23rd title

== Top goalscorers ==
Player	Goals	Team
(Argentina) Diego Klimowicz	7	Rayo Vallecano
(Brazil) Ronaldo	6	Barcelona
(Argentina) Juan Antonio Pizzi	5	Barcelona
(Argentina) Turu Flores	5	Las Palmas
(Croatia) Davor Šuker	5	Real Madrid
(Spain) Juan Sabas	4	Real Betis
(Bulgaria) Lyuboslav Penev	4	Compostela
(Federal Republic of Yugoslavia) Milinko Pantić	4	Atlético Madrid
(Brazil) Alexandre	4	Villarreal
(Uruguay) Julio Rodríguez	4	Lleida
