= Ángel Cuéllar =

Spanish footballer and manager

Personal information
- Full name: Ángel Manuel Cuéllar Llanos
- Date of birth: 13 September 1972 (age 54)
- Place of birth: Villafranca de los Barros, Spain
- Height: 1.70 m (5 ft 7 in)
- Positions: Forward; winger

Youth career
- Revilla
- Amistad
- 1982–1983: Híspalis
- 1983–1989: Betis

Senior career*
Years	Team	Apps	(Gls)
1989–1990	Betis B	43	(20)
1990–1995	Betis	130	(28)
1995–1997	Barcelona	20	(2)
1997–2001	Betis	54	(5)
2001–2002	Gimnàstic	21	(9)
2002–2003	Racing Ferrol	33	(12)
2003–2005	Levante	31	(3)
2005–2007	Lugo	62	(23)
2007–2008	Narón	22	(15)
Total		416	(117)

International career
1987–1989	Spain U16	26	(11)
1988–1990	Spain U18	7	(4)
1991	Spain U20	4	(0)
1991	Spain U23	1	(0)
1994–1995	Spain	2	(0)

Managerial career
- 2013–2015: Paiosaco
- 2015–2017: Cerceda
- 2017: Jumilla
- * Club domestic league appearances and goals

Ángel Manuel Cuéllar Llanos (born 13 September 1972) is a Spanish former professional footballer. He was also a manager.

A left winger or a forward, his main assets were dribbling and scoring ability. He spent most of his career with Betis (nine years) and also had a brief unsuccessful spell with Barcelona, greatly marred by injury.

Over the course of eight La Liga seasons, Cuéllar amassed totals of 111 matches and 17 goals.

== Playing career ==
Born in Villafranca de los Barros, Extremadura, Cuéllar made his debut for Real Betis' first team aged 18, in a 1–0 La Liga away loss against CD Logroñés on 4 November 1990, with the Andalusia side finishing the season last. He became an undisputed starter while in the Segunda División and scored 14 league in 1994–95 as they shot straight from the second tier into a final third place (on 25 September 1994, he scored a hat-trick in a 5–0 home victory over Sporting de Gijón); during the campaign, he also appeared in two friendlies with the Spain national team.

Cuéllar signed a five-year deal with league powerhouse FC Barcelona in June 1995. After suffering an anterior cruciate ligament injury in his first competitive appearance, a 2–0 win at Real Valladolid, he would feature sparingly throughout his two-year spell, as Barça won three trophies during 1996–97.

Returning to Betis in 1997 for 300 million pesetas, Cuéllar would be sacked by club president Manuel Ruiz de Lopera as the side were relegated at the end of the 1999–2000 season, under the allegations of "alarmingly low working performances". Following two stints in the second tier, both ended in relegation, he moved to Levante UD of the same league, and was an important element in the Valencians' top-flight promotion, but would only appear seven times during the next campaign mainly due to injuries.

Subsequently, Cuéllar played three seasons in the Tercera División, two with CD Lugo and his final with Narón BP. After 15 goals in 2007–08, best in the competition, he retired at the age of 35.

== Coaching career ==
In June 2015, Cuéllar was appointed manager of CCD Cerceda in the Spanish fourth tier. Two years later, he moved up one level to Segunda División B's FC Jumilla, being dismissed after failing to win a single match in eight.

== Honours ==
Barcelona

- Copa del Rey: 1996–97
- Supercopa de España: 1996
- UEFA Cup Winners' Cup: 1996–97

Levante

- Segunda División: 2003–04

Spain U16

- UEFA European Under-16 Championship: 1988
