= Finidi George =

Nigerian footballer (born 1971)

Personal information
- Full name: Finidi George
- Date of birth: 15 April 1971 (age 55)
- Place of birth: Port Harcourt, Nigeria
- Height: 1.89 m (6 ft 2 1/2 in)
- Position: Winger

Team information
- Current team: Rivers United (head coach)

Senior career*
Years	Team	Apps	(Gls)
1989	Calabar Rovers		
1990	Iwuanyanwu Nationale		
1991–1993	Sharks		
1993–1996	Ajax	86	(18)
1996–2000	Betis	130	(38)
2000–2001	Mallorca	31	(5)
2001–2003	Ipswich Town	35	(7)
2004	Mallorca	14	(0)
Total		296	(68)

International career
1991–2002	Nigeria	62	(6)

Managerial career
- 2021–2024: Enyimba
- 2024: Nigeria
- 2024–: Rivers United
Medal record
Representing Nigeria
Africa Cup of Nations
Winner	1994 Tunisia	Team
Runner-up	2000 Ghana & Nigeria	Team
- * Club domestic league appearances and goals

Finidi George (born 15 April 1971) is a Nigerian professional football coach and former player who played as a winger. He is the current head coach of Nigerian Professional Football League club Rivers United.

After making a name for himself at Ajax in the Netherlands – being a leading figure in a team which won eight major titles, including the 1995 Champions League – he played several years in Spain with Real Betis, also having a brief spell in England before retiring. Finidi was a member of the Nigeria team during the 1990s, appearing in two World Cups.

== Club career ==
=== Ajax ===
Born in Port Harcourt, Finidi played for three clubs in his country. In 1993, he arrived at AFC Ajax alongside compatriot Nwankwo Kanu. His impact with the Amsterdam side was immediate as he scored four goals in 27 games to help them win the Eredivisie title, which was also achieved in the following two seasons; additionally, as a starter, he appeared in consecutive UEFA Champions League finals, winning the 1994–95 edition against AC Milan.

=== Real Betis ===
On 10 July 1996, Finidi moved to Spain and signed with Real Betis for 1,024 million pesetas or 6 million euros, where he netted in double digits in nearly every season, with the Andalusians finishing fourth in his first year, which also brought a Copa del Rey final loss to FC Barcelona (2–3 after extra time), where he scored. Real Betis has deemed the Nigerian as one of their most spectacular signings; he played an illustrious part in a magnificent team consisting of Alfonso, Robert Jarni, Alexis, Roberto Ríos, and Juan Merino. While at the club, Finidi was consecrated with the nickname: "the playful shadow." Prior to joining Real Betis, he was close to moving to Real Madrid, but the deal fell through.

=== Mallorca and Ipswich Town ===
After Betis' relegation from the top flight in 2000, Finidi stayed one more year in Spain with RCD Mallorca, after which he joined Premier League team Ipswich Town, managed by George Burley, for £3.1 million. He scored twice in a 3–1 victory over Derby County at Portman Road, as well as an audacious lob in a 5-0 win against Sunderland in December of the same year, but underperformed overall, with them also suffering relegation; he was released from contract in June 2003.

In November 2003, the 32-year-old Finidi underwent a trial at former club Mallorca, following which he signed with the Balearic Islands team, helping them finally finish in 11th position after constantly battling relegation.

In mid-November 2010, Finidi returned to Betis as its director of international football. He continued, however, to live in Palma, Majorca, where he had relocated to after his retirement.

== International career ==
Finidi made his debut for Nigeria in 1991, in an Africa Cup of Nations qualifier against Burkina Faso, providing three assists for Rashidi Yekini and scoring once in a 7–1 rout. He helped the national team win the 1994 edition of the tournament in Tunisia, and also achieved one second and two third-place finishes.

Finidi represented Nigeria in two FIFA World Cups, 1994 and 1998. In the former, held in the United States, as the national team won their group and exited in the round of 16 against eventual finalists Italy, he scored against Greece in a 2–0 win, proceeding to mimick a urinating dog whilst celebrating.

In the 1998 tournament in France, Finidi also played in all the matches, with Nigeria meeting the same fate at the hands of Denmark. He had already vowed to quit international football prior to the competition, and earned a total of 62 caps.

== Managerial career ==
In September 2021, Enyimba F.C. named Finidi as their new head coach. He won his first title as a coach on the 11th of June 2023, winning the Nigeria Premier League at Onikan Stadium in Lagos.

In April 2024, he was appointed coach of the Nigeria national football team.

Before this appointment, He was the assistant coach to Jose Peseiro and was the Interim coach who led the Super Eagles to beat Ghana 2-1 ending 18 years of unsuccessful attempts to defeat the Black Stars.

== Style of play ==
Considered to be one of Nigeria's greatest wingers, Finidi was a physically strong and tall player who was known for his deceptively rapid pace, accurate crosses and efficient dribbles. He was also known for his accurate free kicks. Finidi was not only known for his technical abilities, but he also possessed a unique footballing brain and solid dribbling skills.

== Personal life ==
The name Finidi translates into English as "a future full of sun". Two of his 11 brothers, Igeniwari and Celestine, were also footballers, and the former was killed during crowd problems in a match.

During the 2026 FIFA World Cup, George worked as a football pundit. He commended the overall performance of the African nations during the group stage, highlighting Morocco's impressive display against Brazil as a key standout.

== Career statistics ==
=== Club ===
Appearances and goals by club, season and competition
Club	Season	League			National cup		League cup		Continental		Other		Total	
Club	Season	Division	Apps	Goals	Apps	Goals	Apps	Goals	Apps	Goals	Apps	Goals	Apps	Goals
Ajax	1993–94	Eredivisie	27	4	3	2	—		4 (Note: Appearances in UEFA Cup Winners' Cup)	0	—		34	6
Ajax	1994–95	Eredivisie	30	8	3	0	—		10 (Note: Appearances in UEFA Champions League)	1	1 (Note: Appearances in Johan Cruyff Shield)	0	44	9
Ajax	1995–96	Eredivisie	29	6	1	1	—		10	1	4 (Note: Two appearances and one goal in UEFA Super Cup, one appearance in Intercontinental Cup, one appearance in Johan Cruyff Shield)	1	44	9
Ajax	Total		86	18	7	3	—		24	2	5	1	122	24
Betis	1996–97	La Liga	36	10	6	1	—		—		—		42	11
Betis	1997–98	La Liga	34	9	4	2	—		5	1	—		43	12
Betis	1998–99	La Liga	36	11	1	0	—		6 (Note: Appearances in UEFA Cup)	2	—		43	13
Betis	1999–2000	La Liga	24	8	0	0	—		—		—		24	8
Betis	Total		130	38	11	3	—		11	3	—		152	44
Mallorca	2000–01	La Liga	31	5	4	2	—		—		—		35	7
Ipswich Town	2001–02	Premier League	25	6	0	0	0	0	4	1	—		29	7
Ipswich Town	2002–03	First Division	10	1	0	0	2	0	5	0	—		17	1
Ipswich Town	Total		35	7	0	0	2	0	9	1	—		46	8
Mallorca	2003–04	La Liga	14	0	0	0	—		3	0	—		17	0
Career Total			296	68	22	8	2	0	47	6	5	1	372	83

=== International ===
Appearances and goals by national team and year
National team	Year	Apps	Goals
Nigeria	1991	1	1
Nigeria	1992	9	0
Nigeria	1993	6	2
Nigeria	1994	12	1
Nigeria	1995	1	0
Nigeria	1996	1	0
Nigeria	1997	3	0
Nigeria	1998	7	0
Nigeria	1999	1	1
Nigeria	2000	6	1
Nigeria	2001	8	0
Nigeria	2002	7	0
Total		62	6

Scores and results list Nigeria's goal tally first, score column indicates score after each George goal.

List of international goals scored by Finidi George
No.	Date	Venue	Opponent	Score	Result	Competition	Ref.
1	27 July 1991	National Stadium, Lagos, Nigeria	Burkina Faso	7–1	7–1	1992 African Cup of Nations qualification	
2	27 February 1993	Nnamdi Azikiwe Stadium, Enugu, Nigeria	Congo	2–0	2–0	1994 FIFA World Cup qualification	
3	8 October 1993	Stade du 5 Juillet, Algiers, Algeria	Algeria	1–0	1–1	1994 FIFA World Cup qualification	
4	30 June 1994	Foxboro Stadium, Foxborough, USA	Greece	1–0	2–0	1994 FIFA World Cup	
5	23 January 1999	Moshood Abiola National Stadium, Abuja, Nigeria	Burundi	2–0	2–0	2000 African Cup of Nations qualification	
6	3 February 2000	National Stadium, Lagos, Nigeria	Morocco	1–0	2–0	2000 African Cup of Nations	

=== Managerial ===
As of 30 August 2024

Managerial record by team and tenure
Team	From	To	Record				
Team	From	To	P	W	D	L	Win %
Enyimba	15 September 2021	12 May 2024	65	29	15	21	44.6
Nigeria	29 April 2024	15 June 2024	2	0	1	1	0.0
Rivers United	4 July 2024	Present	0	0	0	0	—
Total			67	29	16	22	43.3

== Honours ==
Ajax

- Eredivisie: 1993–94, 1994–95, 1995–96
- Johan Cruyff Shield: 1994, 1995
- UEFA Champions League: 1994–95; runner-up 1995–96
- UEFA Super Cup: 1995
- Intercontinental Cup: 1995

Betis

- Copa del Rey runner-up: 1996–97

Nigeria

- Africa Cup of Nations: 1994; runner-up 2000; third place 1992, 2002
