= Villafranca de los Barros =

- Municipality
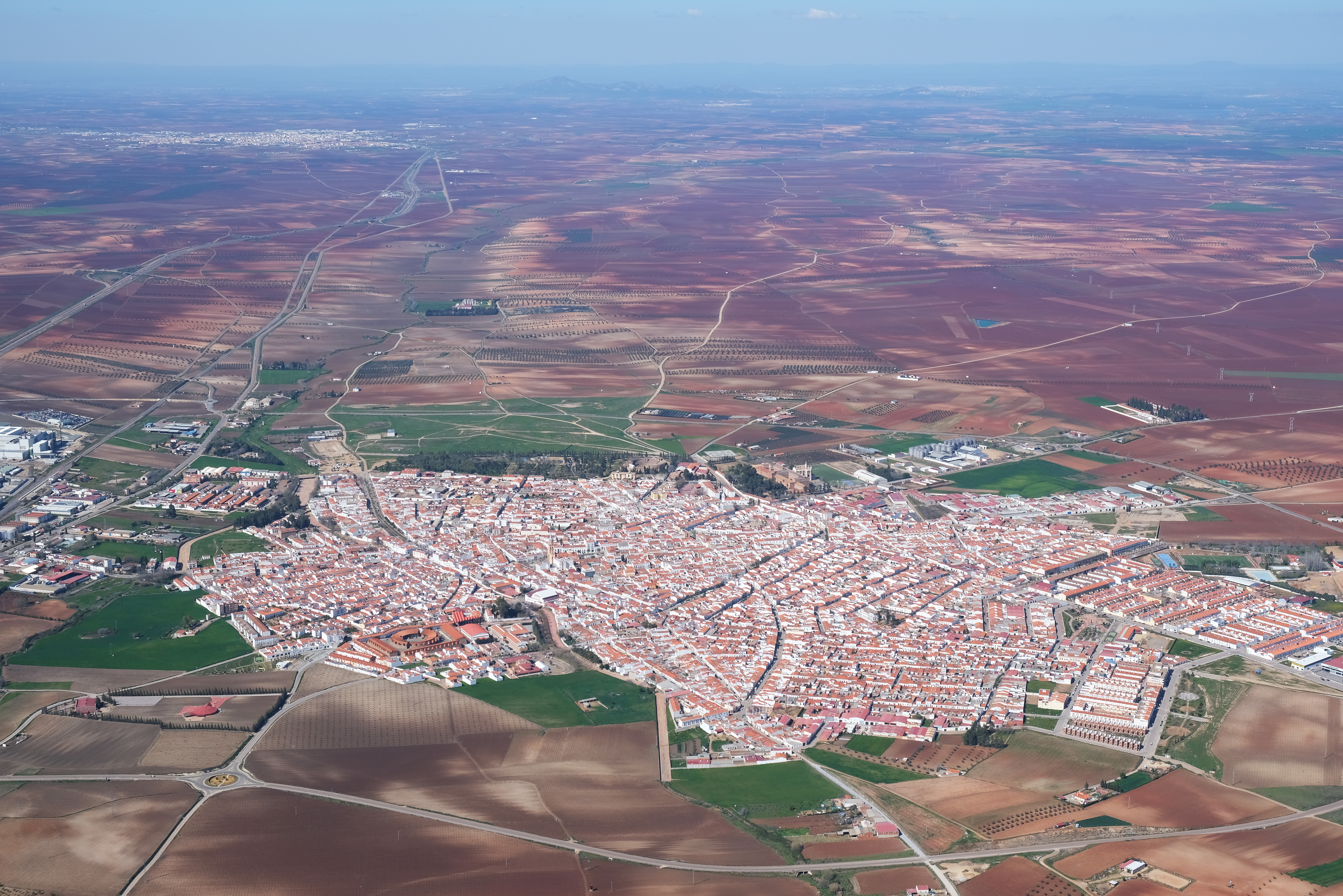
- Aerial view (March 2021)

- Location within Spain Location within Extremadura
- Coordinates: 38°33′41″N 6°20′21″W
- Country: Spain
- Autonomous Community: Extremadura
- Province: Badajoz
- Comarca: Tierra de Barros

Government
  - Mayor: Ramón Ropero Mancera (PSOE)

Area
  - Total: 104 km^{2} (40 sq mi)
- Elevation (AMSL): 410 m (1,350 ft)

Population (2025-01-01)
  - Total: 12,284
  - Density: 118/km^{2} (306/sq mi)
- Time zone: UTC+1 (CET)
  - Summer (DST): UTC+2 (CEST (GMT +2))
- Postal code: 06220
- Area code: +34 (Spain) + 924 (Badajoz)
- Website: website

Villafranca de los Barros is a municipality in the province of Badajoz, Extremadura, Spain. It has a population of 13,329 and an area of 104 km^{2}.

== See also ==
- List of municipalities in Badajoz
