= Nenad Bjelica =

Croatian football manager

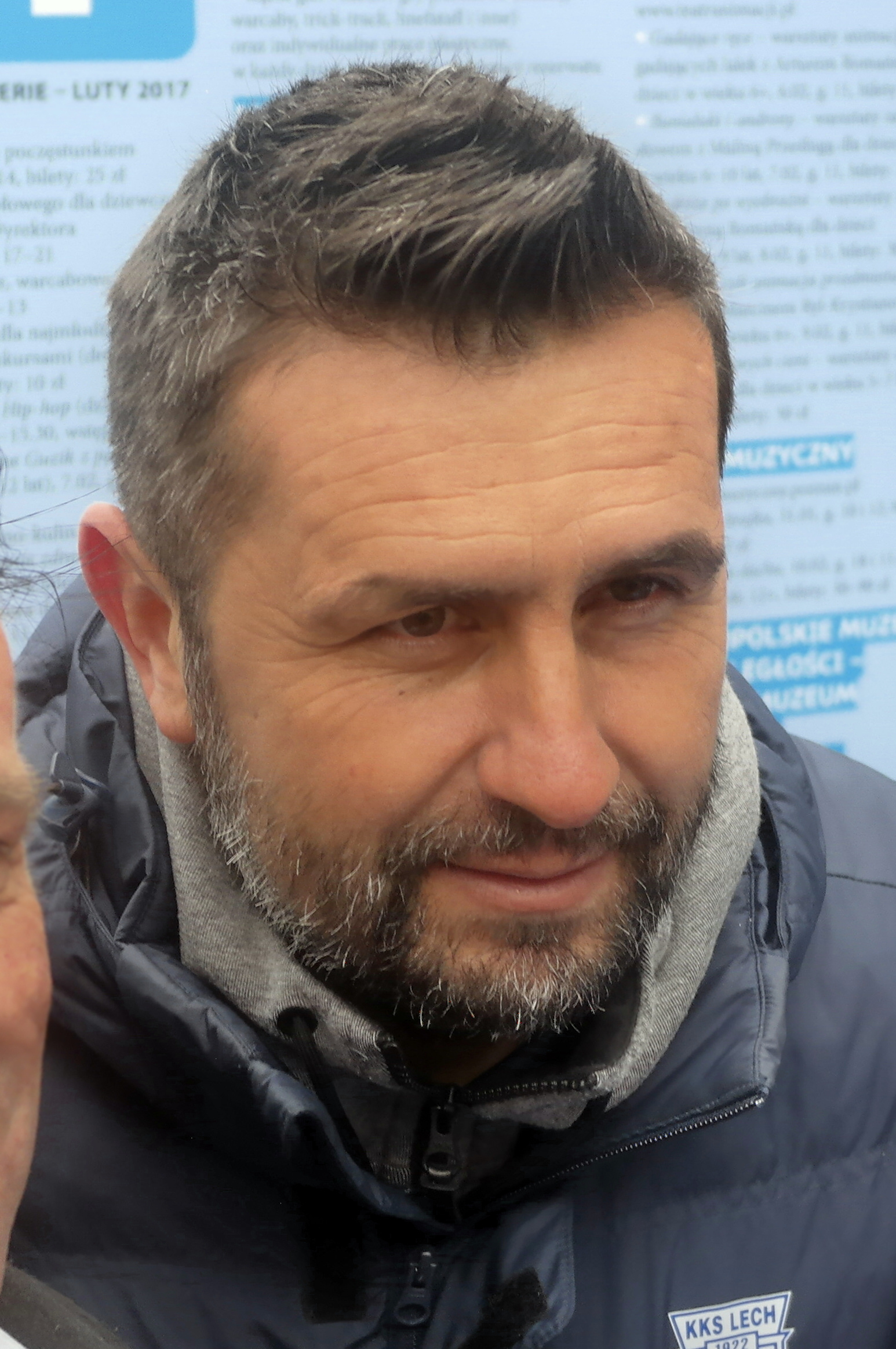
- Bjelica in 2017

Personal information
- Date of birth: 20 August 1971 (age 55)
- Place of birth: Osijek, SR Croatia, Yugoslavia
- Height: 1.81 m (5 ft 11 in)
- Position: Midfielder

Team information
- Current team: Samsunspor (head coach)

Youth career
- 1989–1990: Metalac Olt
- 1990–1991: Osijek

Senior career*
Years	Team	Apps	(Gls)
1991–1993	Osijek	28	(7)
1993–1996	Albacete	79	(19)
1996–1998	Real Betis	30	(2)
1998–1999	Las Palmas	24	(3)
1999–2001	Osijek	30	(16)
2001–2004	Kaiserslautern	65	(5)
2002–2003	Kaiserslautern II	6	(0)
2004–2006	Admira Wacker	52	(12)
2006–2008	Kärnten	58	(17)
Total		372	(81)

International career
1993	Croatia U21	1	(0)
2001	Croatia B	1	(0)
2001–2004	Croatia	9	(0)

Managerial career
- 2007–2009: Kärnten
- 2009–2010: Lustenau 07
- 2010–2013: WAC St. Andrä
- 2013–2014: Austria Wien
- 2014–2015: Spezia
- 2016–2018: Lech Poznań
- 2018–2020: Dinamo Zagreb
- 2020–2022: Osijek
- 2023: Trabzonspor
- 2023–2024: Union Berlin
- 2024: Dinamo Zagreb
- 2026–: Samsunspor
- * Club domestic league appearances and goals

Nenad Bjelica (Croatian pronunciation: [něnaːd bjělitsa]; born 20 August 1971) is a Croatian professional football manager and former player. He is currently the head coach of Turkish club Samsunspor.

== Club career ==
Born in Osijek, Bjelica began playing for local club Metalac Olt in the 1989–90 season. He quickly moved to Osijek and spent almost four seasons there before moving abroad to Spain.

Bjelica played for Albacete for four years, during which the team reached the Copa del Rey semi-final in the 1994–95 season. In 1996, he moved to Real Betis and was in the team that was the runner-up in the 1996–97 campaign. The next season, Bjelica spent at Las Palmas, but returned to Real Betis a year later. Due to injuries, he played very few games in this period and would again spend a season at Las Palmas until the end of 1999.

Bjelica then returned home to Osijek for two seasons and recovered his form, playing with the team in three stages of the UEFA Cup. He then moved to Kaiserslautern in 2000, where he spent four seasons, until semi-retiring from top-tier football in 2004. During the 2004–05 season, Bjelica played for Admira Wacker. After that, he played for the Austrian club Kärnten in the Second League before retiring on 30 June 2008.

== International career ==
Bjelica made his debut for Croatia in a February 2001 friendly match against Austria and earned a total of nine caps. His final international was a June 2004 European Championship match against France in Portugal. He retired from the team in that year, at the same time the manager Otto Barić was replaced.

== Managerial career ==
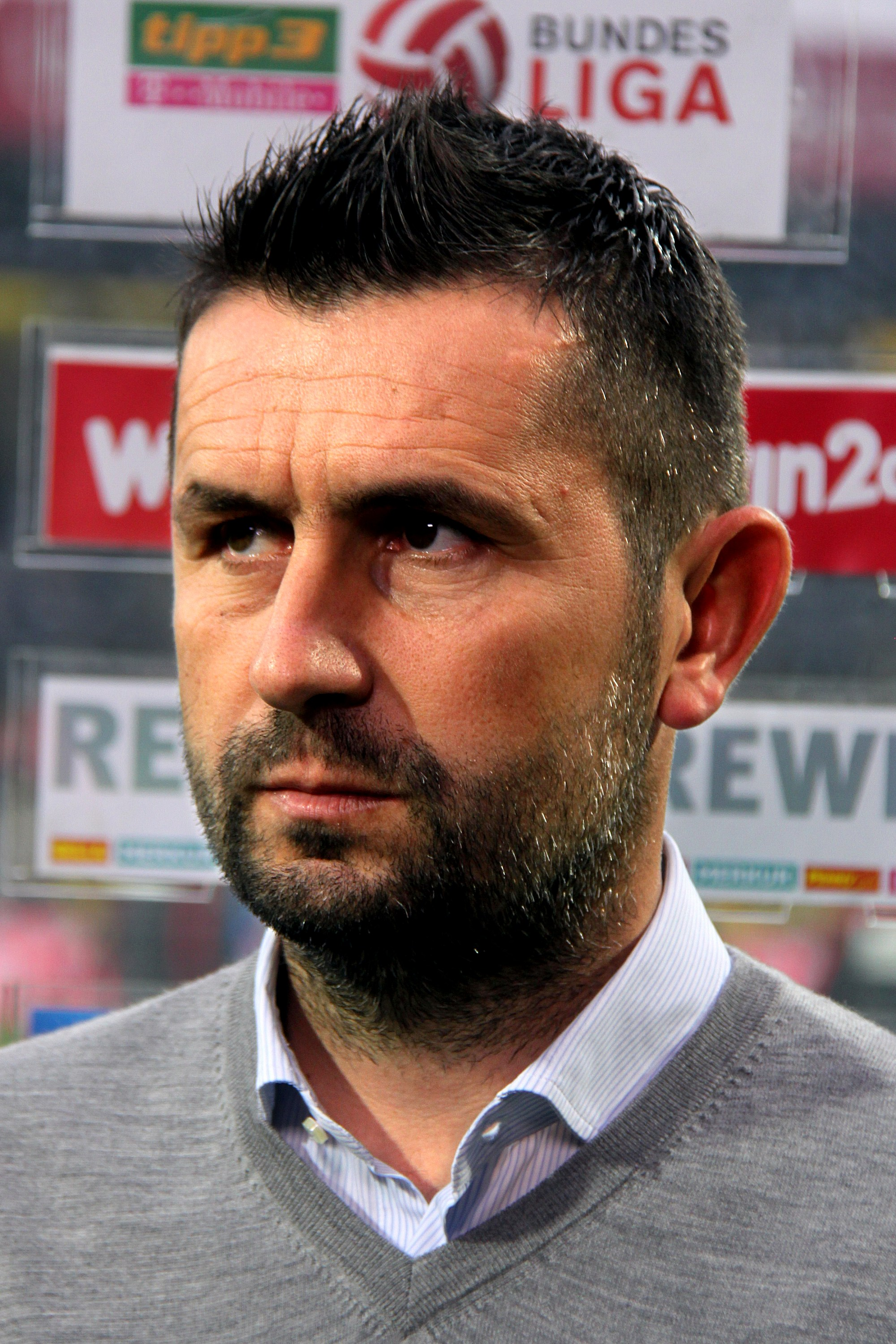
Bjelica with Austria Wien in October 2013

Bjelica began his coaching career on 15 September 2007 at Kärnten, as player-caretaker manager. On 1 July 2008, he signed a full managing contract, just a day after ending his playing career.

Bjelica was the head coach of Lustenau 07 from March to December 2009, as well as of WAC St. Andrä from May 2010 to June 2013. Bjelica moved to Austria Wien on 17 June 2013 as their new head coach, and qualified for the 2013–14 UEFA Champions League group stage, defeating the Croatian champion Dinamo Zagreb in the last round of qualification, with the club. Bjelica was sacked on 16 February 2014. As Austria Wien failed to qualify for the UEFA Europa League at the end of the season, his contract expired.

In June 2014, he was hired by Serie B side Spezia. On 30 August 2016, he was appointed head coach at Polish side Lech Poznań. On 10 May 2018, he was released from his contract at Lech.

On 15 May 2018, Bjelica signed a two-year contract with the Croatian champion Dinamo Zagreb, being appointed as their head coach. Four days later, he celebrated winning the league title, while on 23 May he won the Croatian Cup. On 8 November, Dinamo managed to qualify for the 2018–19 UEFA Europa League knockout phase, defeating Spartak Trnava. On 18 September 2019, Bjelica led Dinamo in the club's inaugural match in the UEFA Champions League after two seasons, with a 4–0 home win against Atalanta. On 16 April 2020, following the sacking of the entire coaching staff by the club, it was announced that Dinamo terminated the contract with Bjelica.

In September 2020, after failing to win three opening games of their season, Croatian club Osijek sacked their head coach Ivica Kulešević and appointed Bjelica instead.

He was named the new head coach of Union Berlin on 26 November 2023. In May 2024, he was sacked.

On 26 September 2024, Bjelica signed a multi-year contract with Dinamo Zagreb and returned as the club's head coach after four years.

On 14 October 2026, Bjelica was named the head coach of Samsunspor until the end of the season and returned to Turkey after three years.

== Personal life ==
Bjelica is of paternal Montenegrin and maternal Croatian descent. In 1997, he married his wife Senka. The couple have two sons: Luka and Luan. Besides his native Croatian, Bjelica speaks English, German, Italian, Polish and Spanish fluently and also he is learning French.

== Managerial statistics ==
As of match played 21 November 2026

Managerial record by team and tenure
Team	From	To	Record					Ref.
Team	From	To	P	W	D	L	Win %	Ref.
Kärnten	15 September 2007	29 January 2009	41	17	11	13	41.46	
Lustenau 07	19 March 2009	11 December 2009	31	12	8	11	38.71	
WAC St. Andrä	10 May 2010	17 June 2013	124	56	29	39	45.16	
Austria Wien	17 June 2013	16 February 2014	35	12	10	13	34.29	
Spezia	22 June 2014	21 November 2015	61	25	18	18	40.98	
Lech Poznań	30 August 2016	10 May 2018	78	41	21	16	52.56	
Dinamo Zagreb	15 May 2018	16 April 2020	101	73	15	13	72.28	
Osijek	5 September 2020	29 August 2022	87	49	23	15	56.32	
Trabzonspor	18 April 2023	12 October 2023	16	8	0	8	50.00	
Union Berlin	26 November 2023	6 May 2024	22	6	6	10	27.27	
Dinamo Zagreb	26 September 2024	29 December 2024	15	5	6	4	33.33	
Samsunspor	14 October 2026	Present	5	1	0	4	20.00	
Total			616	305	147	164	49.51	—

== Honours ==
=== Player ===
Individual

- Croatian Footballer of the Year: 2000

=== Manager ===
WAC St. Andrä

- Austrian Second League: 2011–12

Dinamo Zagreb

- Prva HNL: 2017–18, 2018–19
- Croatian Cup: 2017–18
- Croatian Super Cup: 2019

Individual

- Ekstraklasa Coach of the Month: February 2017, March 2018
- SN Sportsperson of the Year: 2019
