= Tomás Olías =

Spanish footballer

Personal information
- Full name: Tomás Olías Gutiérrez
- Date of birth: 4 February 1969 (age 57)
- Place of birth: Madrid, Spain
- Height: 1.86 m (6 ft 1 in)
- Position: Centre-back

Youth career
- Moscardó

Senior career*
Years	Team	Apps	(Gls)
1987–1989	Moscardó		
1989–1991	Málaga	0	(0)
1989–1990	→ Marbella (loan)	27	(2)
1990–1991	→ Estepona (loan)	25	(3)
1991–1993	Marbella	65	(10)
1993–1999	Betis	153	(11)
1999–2002	Las Palmas	73	(6)
2002–2004	Levante	35	(0)
Total		378	(32)
- * Club domestic league appearances and goals

Tomás Olías Gutiérrez (born 4 February 1969) is a Spanish former footballer who played mostly as a central defender.

He amassed La Liga totals of 161 matches and eight goals over seven seasons, in service of Betis (five years) and Las Palmas.

== Club career ==
After emerging through the ranks of CDC Moscardó in his hometown of Madrid, Olías went straight into La Liga in 1989 after signing with CD Málaga, but he never appeared in competitive games for the former club during his spell, being consecutively loaned. At the end of 1991–92, he achieved promotion to Segunda División with CA Marbella; in the following season, he scored a career-best seven goals to help the team to a comfortable seventh-place finish.

In the summer of 1993, Olías followed Marbella coach Sergije Krešić to Real Betis, and he contributed with four goals from 28 appearances in top-division promotion as runners-up. In the following campaign he featured relatively less – Krešić was also fired in the final stretch, being replaced by Lorenzo Serra Ferrer as the side eventually finished third; his first game in the Spanish top flight took place on 18 September 1994 when he came on as a 55th-minute substitute for Alexis Trujillo in a 1–0 away loss against Athletic Bilbao, and his maiden goal in the competition occurred on 6 November in a 1–1 home draw with Valencia CF.

In the next years at the Estadio Benito Villamarín, Olías was regularly played as either a stopper or a defensive midfielder. In 1996–97 he netted five times in the league, including a solo effort in the Seville derby which concluded a 3–0 away win over Sevilla FC; during his spell, he was affectionately known as Monsignor by fans due to the lack of hair in his crown.

Aged 30, Olías returned to the second tier in 1999, signing with UD Las Palmas and again reuniting with Krešić (as well as former Betis teammates Robert Jarni and Jaime Quesada). With 37 matches and five goals from the player in his first season, another promotion befell.

Subsequently, Olías began to deal with injury problems, which aggravated at his next club Levante UD. He retired in June 2004, at the age of 35.

== Post-retirement ==
After retiring, Olías lost all connection to the football world. He also opened a coffeehouse in Marbella, called "Primer Express".

== Honours ==
Marbella

- Segunda División B: 1991–92

Las Palmas

- Segunda División: 1999–2000
