= Fernando Varela (Spanish footballer) =

Spanish footballer

Personal information
- Full name: Fernando Varela Ramos
- Date of birth: 1 September 1979 (age 47)
- Place of birth: Dos Hermanas, Spain
- Height: 1.80 m (5 ft 11 in)
- Position: Midfielder

Youth career
- CP Cantely
- Instituto Virgen Valme
- Dos Hermanas
- 1992–1996: Betis

Senior career*
Years	Team	Apps	(Gls)
1996–2000	Betis B	99	(13)
1997–2006	Betis	158	(3)
2000	→ Extremadura (loan)	23	(3)
2006–2010	Mallorca	114	(10)
2010–2011	Kasımpaşa	21	(4)
2011–2012	Valladolid	0	(0)
Total		415	(33)

International career
1994–1996	Spain U16	15	(3)
1995–1997	Spain U17	7	(0)
1996–1998	Spain U18	4	(0)
1998–1999	Spain U20	10	(3)
1999–2001	Spain U21	10	(0)
Medal record
Representing Spain
Men's football
FIFA World Youth Championship
Winner	1999 Nigeria
- * Club domestic league appearances and goals

Fernando Varela Ramos (born 1 September 1979) is a Spanish former professional footballer. Mainly a right midfielder, he could also play as an attacking right-back.

He amassed La Liga totals of 257 matches and 13 goals over 11 seasons, in representation of Betis and Mallorca. He won one Copa del Rey with the former club.

== Club career ==
=== Betis ===
Born in Dos Hermanas, Province of Seville, Varela was a youth player at local Real Betis, and made his first-team – and La Liga – debut in 1996–97's closing stages, in a 1–1 away draw against Valencia CF. In the 2001–02 season, after a six-month stint with Segunda División club CF Extremadura, he established himself definitely in the main squad, appearing in 25 league games.

Over six full campaigns with Betis, Varela only scored three goals, but they were noted as some of the best in the Andalusians' history, including once against FC Barcelona where, from his own half, he dribbled past five opponents struck the ball into the top corner with his left foot (2002–03), and a fantastic left-footed volley against city rivals Sevilla FC in 2005–06.

=== Mallorca ===
Varela signed with RCD Mallorca for 2006–07. He had a slow start, which culminated in two red cards in the first 11 matches. Towards the end of the season he was fully reinstated as right midfielder, being more involved in the team's offence and netting three times, including one against Real Madrid on the final matchday as the hosts eventually won 3–1 and conquered the league title.

The following campaign, incidentally against Real Madrid, Varela scored twice, but Mallorca lost again in Spain's capital (4–3), on 11 November 2007. In 2009–10, as the Balearic Islands club finished fifth and qualified for the UEFA Europa League, he lost his importance in the team and only made 15 league appearances whilst completing just three, due to both injuries and the emergence of Uruguayan Chory Castro.

=== Later years ===
In July 2010, aged 31, Varela left his country for the first time, joining Turkish side Kasımpaşa SK. He retired at the end of the 2011–12 season with Real Valladolid, failing to feature in the second tier due to a back injury.

== International career ==
Varela was included by Spain in the 1999 FIFA World Youth Championship squad. He played all seven games for the champions in Nigeria, scoring in 3–1 victories over Honduras in the group stage and Mali in the semi-finals (twice).

== Honours ==
Betis

- Copa del Rey: 2004–05

Spain U20

- FIFA World Youth Championship: 1999
