= Alexis Trujillo =

Spanish footballer and manager

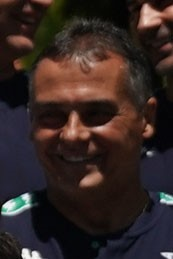
- Trujillo with Betis in 2022

Personal information
- Full name: Humberto Alexis Trujillo Oramas
- Date of birth: 30 July 1965 (age 61)
- Place of birth: Las Palmas, Spain
- Height: 1.74 m (5 ft 9 in)
- Position: Central midfielder

Youth career
- Las Palmas

Senior career*
Years	Team	Apps	(Gls)
1983–1992	Las Palmas	221	(34)
1992–1993	Tenerife	4	(0)
1993–2000	Betis	222	(23)
2000–2004	Universidad LP	140	(22)
Total		587	(79)

Managerial career
- 2004–2006: Betis (assistant)
- 2017: Betis (interim)
- 2020: Betis (interim)
- * Club domestic league appearances and goals

Humberto Alexis Trujillo Oramas (born 30 July 1965) is a Spanish former professional footballer who played as a central midfielder.

== Playing career ==
Born in Las Palmas, Canary Islands, Trujillo was a penalty kick specialist. His 21-year professional career was closely associated with Las Palmas and Real Betis, and he appeared in more than 200 matches in both La Liga and Segunda División, eventually captaining both clubs.

Trujillo retired at the age of 39 after four seasons with another local side, Universidad de Las Palmas (the last three spent in the Segunda División B).

== Coaching career ==
From 2004 to 2006, Trujillo acted as assistant manager at Andalusia's Betis who, under Lorenzo Serra Ferrer, qualified for the UEFA Champions League in the latter campaign. On 9 May 2017, he replaced the fired Víctor Sánchez at the helm of the first team, after having been working as a head scout. He drew each of the remaining fixtures of the season, starting with a 1–1 home result against Atlético Madrid.

Having worked as the club's sporting director, Trujillo was back as interim manager of Betis on 21 June 2020, when Rubi was dismissed with eight games to play.

== Managerial statistics ==
As of 19 July 2020

Managerial record by team and tenure
Team	Nat	From	To	Record								Ref
Team	Nat	From	To	G	W	D	L	GF	GA	GD	Win %	Ref
Betis (interim)	(Spain)	9 May 2017	26 May 2017	2	0	2	0	3	3	+0	0.00	
Betis (interim)	(Spain)	21 June 2020	19 July 2020	8	2	1	5	8	12	−4	25.00	
Total				10	2	3	5	11	15	−4	20.00	—

== Honours ==
Las Palmas

- Segunda División: 1984–85

Betis

- Copa del Rey runner-up: 1996–97
