= Lorenzo Serra Ferrer =

Spanish football coach (born 1953)

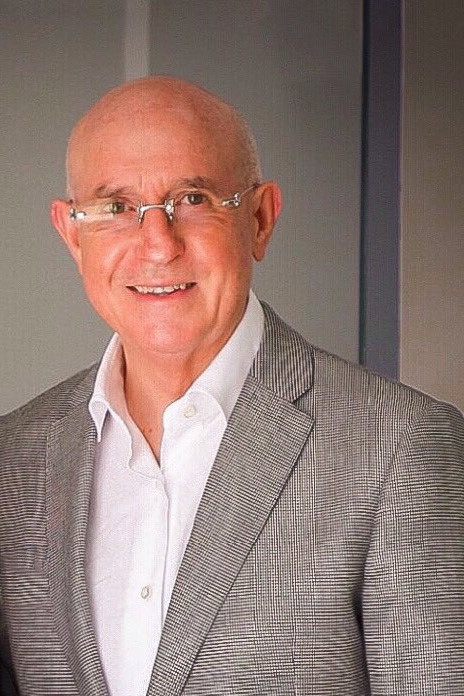
- Serra Ferrer in 2019

Personal information
- Full name: Lorenzo Serra Ferrer
- Date of birth: 5 March 1953 (age 73)
- Place of birth: Sa Pobla, Spain
- Position: Midfielder

Senior career*
Years	Team	Apps	(Gls)
1973–1976	Poblense		

Managerial career
- 1980–1983: Poblense
- 1983–1985: Mallorca B
- 1983: Mallorca (interim)
- 1985–1993: Mallorca
- 1993–1997: Betis
- 2000–2001: Barcelona
- 2004–2006: Betis
- 2006–2008: AEK Athens
- * Club domestic league appearances and goals

Lorenzo Serra Ferrer (Spanish pronunciation: [loˈɾenθo ˈsera feˈreɾ]; Catalan: Llorenç Serra Ferrer [ʎuˈɾɛns ˈsɛrə fəˈre]; born 5 March 1953) is a Spanish football manager.

His career was mainly associated with Mallorca and Betis, and he also served the former in various other capacities.

== Playing career ==
Born in Sa Pobla, Mallorca, Balearic Islands, Serra Ferrer played three years with local amateurs Poblense, retiring from football at only 22.

== Coaching career ==
=== Early years ===
After coaching youth team La Salle, Serra Ferrer joined his only club as a player in 1980. He won two national championships, and led them to a first-ever promotion to Segunda División B in his second season.

=== Mallorca ===
In 1983, Serra Ferrer signed for another side in the region, Mallorca, spending two years with their reserves. In the 1983–84 season, he also coached the main squad in one game as an interim manager.

Serra Ferrer promoted twice to La Liga during his spell at the Lluís Sitjar Stadium, in 1986 and 1989, also reaching the Copa del Rey final in 1991, losing 1–0 to Atlético Madrid.

=== Betis ===
After eight full seasons with Mallorca, Serra Ferrer joined Real Betis of Segunda División, immediately earning promotion and subsequently achieving a third place the following campaign, only trailing champions Real Madrid and Deportivo de La Coruña whilst posting the best defensive record in the league (25 goals in 38 matches) and qualifying for the UEFA Cup.

In 1997, Serra Ferrer led his team to the domestic cup final (a 3–2 overtime loss against Barcelona), after once again qualifying the Andalusians for European competitions with a fourth-place finish in the league.

=== Barcelona, Betis return ===
Serra Ferrer moved to Barcelona after the Spanish Cup final, but spent three years working in directorial capacities. In 2000–01, after being named Louis van Gaal's successor following the latter's dismissal, he coached the team until the 31st matchday, being fired after a 3–1 defeat at Osasuna with the Catalans in the fifth position, trailing leaders Real Madrid by 17 points; he was replaced by former club legend Carles Rexach.

In 2004, Serra Ferrer returned to Betis, leading it to another top-four league finish – with the subsequent qualification for the UEFA Champions League, a first-ever – as well as winning that season's Spanish Cup. The following campaign the team only managed to rank 14th in the league, also being ousted in the Champions League group stage in spite of a 1–0 home win against Chelsea.

=== AEK Athens ===
Serra Ferrer joined AEK Athens from Greece in the summer of 2006. In his first season he led the capital club to the second place in the domestic league, as the team also achieved their first Champions League wins against Lille and AC Milan, being eventually ousted in the group phase.

In late May 2007, Serra Ferrer signed a four-year extension to his contract, which was to expire at the end of 2007–08. On 13 August, as AEK was drawn against Sevilla in the Champions League third qualifying round, he stated: "The tie (vs Sevilla) will be intensely emotional for me", adding "I will return to a city I love very dearly." The Spaniards eventually won 6–1 on aggregate.

On 12 February 2008, Serra Ferrer was fired after an early exit in the Greek Cup, and a poor league run that saw the side drop from first to third in the space of a week.

=== Mallorca return ===
On 29 June 2010, a group headed by Serra Ferrer became the new owner of Mallorca, taking over from main shareholder Mateu Alemany for a fee believed to be around €2 million. On 9 July he was named the club's vice president and director of football, as it was in the process of going into voluntary administration, trying to sort out debts of up to €85 million.

== Honours ==
Poblense

- Tercera División: 1980–81, 1981–82

Mallorca

- Copa del Rey runner-up: 1990–91

Betis

- Copa del Rey: 2004–05; runner-up: 1996–97
