= Luis Fernández (footballer, born 1972) =

Spanish footballer

Personal information
- Full name: Luis Fernández Gutiérrez
- Date of birth: 29 September 1972 (age 54)
- Place of birth: Argomilla, Spain
- Height: 1.72 m (5 ft 8 in)
- Position: Left-back

Youth career
- Cayón
- Atlético Perines
- Racing Santander

Senior career*
Years	Team	Apps	(Gls)
1992–1993	Gimnástica	11	(0)
1993–1996	Racing Santander	53	(3)
1996–2006	Betis	228	(1)
2006–2009	Racing Santander	36	(0)
Total		328	(4)

Managerial career
- 2019–2024: Cayón
- * Club domestic league appearances and goals

Luis Fernández Gutiérrez (born 29 September 1972) is a Spanish former professional footballer who played as a left-back. He is currently a manager.

In a senior career spanning 17 years, he was best known for his time at Betis, totalling 271 appearances over one decade. He also had two spells at Racing de Santander.

== Playing career ==
Fernández was born in Argomilla, Cantabria. After starting out at lowly Gimnástica de Torrelavega, he made his La Liga debut for local giants Racing de Santander against Atlético Madrid, on 24 April 1994. He went on to play 58 competitive games, before signing with Real Betis of the same league for the 1996–97 season.

At Betis, Fernández consistently appeared as his team's main left-back for ten years. He featured in the UEFA Champions League for the Seville club in 2005–06, having contributed 22 league appearances the previous campaign.

Aged 34, Fernández returned to Racing ahead of 2006–07, playing 18 matches in his second season as they achieved a first-ever qualification for the UEFA Cup. On 19 April 2009, as he was nothing more than a fringe player, he appeared in his 300th top-division game, a 1–0 loss at RCD Espanyol, and retired in the summer at the age of 37, continuing to work with the club as a scout in the following years.

== Coaching career ==
In summer 2019, Fernández was appointed manager of Tercera División side CD Cayón in his region of birth. He achieved two promotions during his spell, being relegated the same number of times and leaving in May 2024.

== Honours ==
Betis

- Copa del Rey: 2004–05
