= Juan Ureña =

Spanish footballer

Personal information
- Full name: Juan Antonio González Ureña
- Date of birth: 13 December 1967 (age 58)
- Place of birth: Montilla, Spain
- Height: 1.83 m (6 ft 0 in)
- Position: Centre-back

Youth career
- Montilla
- Betis

Senior career*
Years	Team	Apps	(Gls)
1985–1989	Betis B	69	(2)
1987–2000	Betis	228	(7)
Total		297	(9)
- * Club domestic league appearances and goals

Juan Antonio González Ureña (born 13 December 1967) is a Spanish former footballer who played as a central defender.

He played only for Betis during his career, amassing La Liga totals of 104 games and three goals over ten seasons and adding 124 appearances in the Segunda División (276 matches and nine goals in all competitions).

== Club career ==
Ureña was born in Montilla, Córdoba. During his professional career he played solely for Real Betis, appearing in a total of 228 games in both major levels of Spanish football and scoring seven goals. He made his debut in La Liga on 24 May 1987, playing 35 minutes in a 5–1 home win against Real Sociedad.

Ureña's best years came during 1989 to 1995: he spent four seasons with the team in the Segunda División then, after the Andalusians had returned to the top flight in 1993–94, contributed 26 matches and one goal the following year to an overachieving third place.

Ureña retired at the end of 1999–2000 at the age of 32, having taken no part in the league campaign which ended in relegation. He continued to work with his only club, mainly as a youth coach but also as a technical director. During his spell, he also played five games in the UEFA Cup (two separate editions) and two in the 1997–98 UEFA Cup Winners' Cup.

== See also ==
- List of one-club men
