= Toni Prats =

Spanish footballer

Personal information
- Full name: Antonio Prats Cervera
- Date of birth: 9 September 1971 (age 55)
- Place of birth: Capdepera, Spain
- Height: 1.85 m (6 ft 1 in)
- Position: Goalkeeper

Youth career
- Mallorca

Senior career*
Years	Team	Apps	(Gls)
1990–1992	Mallorca B	12	(0)
1991–1995	Mallorca	85	(0)
1995–1996	Celta	41	(0)
1996–2005	Betis	282	(2)
2005–2007	Mallorca	52	(0)
2007–2008	Hércules	7	(0)
Total		479	(2)
Medal record
Men's football
Representing Spain
UEFA European Under-21 Championship
Bronze medal – third place	1994 France
- * Club domestic league appearances and goals

Antonio 'Toni' Prats Cervera (born 9 September 1971) is a Spanish former professional footballer who played as a goalkeeper.

In a career spent mainly with Betis, he appeared in 338 La Liga matches over 12 seasons (467 across both major levels), winning one Copa del Rey with the club.

== Club career ==
Prats was born in Capdepera, Mallorca. After emerging through his hometown RCD Mallorca's youth system (appearing in one La Liga match in the 1991–92 season, a 1–2 home loss against Athletic Bilbao) and playing one year with RC Celta de Vigo, he finally settled at Seville's Real Betis, where he remained nine years. Ironically, in 1999–2000, as the Andalusians were relegated from the top flight, he scored against Atlético Madrid and Real Madrid through free kicks, in respectively a 2–1 win and 2–1 loss.

In 2005–06, alleging personal reasons, Prats returned to Mallorca for a further two campaigns, before the emergence of Miguel Ángel Moyá forced a move to Segunda División club Hércules CF where he was scarcely used, retiring in March 2008 following recurrent back problems.

== International career ==
Prats was called once by the Spain national team. He remained on the bench in an infamous 3–2 away loss against Cyprus in the UEFA Euro 2000 qualifiers on 5 September 1998, with manager Javier Clemente being dismissed in the aftermath.

== Personal life ==
Prats' nephew Abdón was also a footballer. A forward, he also was a product of Mallorca's youth system.

== Career statistics ==
Appearances and goals by club, season and competition
Club	Season	League			National cup		Continental		Other		Total	
Club	Season	Division	Apps	Goals	Apps	Goals	Apps	Goals	Apps	Goals	Apps	Goals
Mallorca B	1990–91	Segunda División B	12	0	—		—		—		12	0
Mallorca	1991–92	Segunda División	1	0	0	0	—		—		1	0
Mallorca	1992–93	Segunda División	14	0	4	0	—		1 (Note: Appearance in La Liga play-offs)	0	19	0
Mallorca	1993–94	Segunda División	32	0	0	0	—		—		32	0
Mallorca	1994–95	Segunda División	38	0	9	0	—		—		47	0
Mallorca	Total		85	0	13	0	—		1	0	99	0
Celta	1995–96	La Liga	41	0	2	0	—		—		43	0
Betis	1996–97	La Liga	40	0	0	0	—		—		40	0
Betis	1997–98	La Liga	36	0	3	0	6 (Note: Appearances in UEFA Cup Winners' Cup)	0	—		45	0
Betis	1998–99	La Liga	32	0	2	0	6 (Note: Appearances in UEFA Europa League)	0	—		40	0
Betis	1999–2000	La Liga	37	2	0	0	—		—		37	2
Betis	2000–01	Segunda División	38	0	0	0	—		—		38	0
Betis	2001–02	La Liga	36	0	1	0	—		—		37	0
Betis	2002–03	La Liga	38	0	3	0	5	0	—		46	0
Betis	2003–04	La Liga	16	0	3	0	—		—		19	0
Betis	2004–05	La Liga	9	0	0	0	—		—		9	0
Betis	Total		282	2	12	0	17	0	—		311	2
Mallorca	2005–06	La Liga	30	0	0	0	—		—		30	0
Mallorca	2006–07	La Liga	22	0	0	0	—		—		22	0
Mallorca	Total		52	0	0	0	—		—		52	0
Hércules	2007–08	Segunda División	7	0	0	0	—		—		7	0
Career total			479	2	27	0	17	0	1	0	524	2

== Honours ==
Betis

- Copa del Rey: 2004–05

Spain U21

- UEFA European Under-21 Championship third place: 1994
