= Juan José Cañas (footballer) =

Spanish footballer

Juanjo Cañas
Personal information
- Full name: Juan José Cañas Gutiérrez
- Date of birth: 17 April 1972 (age 54)
- Place of birth: Rota, Spain
- Height: 1.79 m (5 ft 10 in)
- Position: Midfielder

Youth career
- Betis

Senior career*
| Years | Team | Apps | (Gls) |
| 1990–1993 | Betis B | 79 | (8) |
| 1991–2006 | Betis | 302 | (13) |
| 2006–2008 | Alcalá | 63 | (3) |
| Total | | 444 | (24) |
- * Club domestic league appearances and goals

Juan José "Juanjo" Cañas Gutiérrez (born 17 April 1972) is a Spanish retired professional footballer who played as a midfielder.

He spent the majority of his career with Betis, where he appeared in 359 official matches over 15 seasons.

== Club career ==
Born in Rota, Andalusia, Cañas represented Real Betis in his professional career and played 228 La Liga games during his tenure (scoring ten goals), his debut in the competition coming on 4 September 1994 in a 0–0 away draw against CD Logroñés; previously, he made a total of 53 first-team appearances over three seasons as the Andalusians were in the Segunda División. The highlight of his lengthy career was lifting the Copa del Rey in 2005, as he was always captain when playing.

Also in the 2004–05 campaign, Cañas still contributed 24 matches to help the club to a fourth place in the league, good enough to reach the qualifying rounds of the UEFA Champions League. From 2006 to 2008 he played for lowly CD Alcalá – also in his native region – in the Segunda División B, and retired at the age of 36.

Afterwards, Cañas worked two seasons with Betis as a member of their technical staff.

== Personal life ==
Cañas' nephew, José, is also a footballer and a midfielder. He too spent most of his professional career with Betis.

== Honours ==
Betis

- Copa del Rey: 2004–05
