= Alfonso Pérez =

Spanish footballer

Alfonso
Personal information
- Full name: Alfonso Pérez Muñoz
- Date of birth: 26 September 1972 (age 54)
- Place of birth: Getafe, Spain
- Height: 1.78 m (5 ft 10 in)
- Position: Striker

Youth career
- 1985–1986: Getafe
- 1986–1989: Real Madrid

Senior career*
Years	Team	Apps	(Gls)
1989–1992	Real Madrid B	17	(4)
1991–1995	Real Madrid	89	(13)
1995–2000	Betis	152	(59)
2000–2003	Barcelona	21	(2)
2002	→ Marseille (loan)	11	(4)
2002–2003	→ Betis (loan)	15	(6)
2003–2005	Betis	30	(4)
Total		335	(92)

International career
1988–1989	Spain U16	12	(6)
1989–1990	Spain U18	12	(5)
1991	Spain U19	1	(0)
1991–1993	Spain U21	7	(0)
1991–1992	Spain U23	11	(6)
1992–2000	Spain	38	(11)
Medal record
Representing Spain
Men's Football
Gold medal – first place	1992 Barcelona	Team competition
- * Club domestic league appearances and goals

Alfonso Pérez Muñoz (born 26 September 1972), known simply as Alfonso, is a Spanish former professional footballer who played as a striker.

Having represented both Real Madrid and Barcelona during his career, he appeared in 307 La Liga games for three clubs, also having two spells with Real Betis. He scored 84 goals in the competition over 15 seasons.

The recipient of 38 caps for Spain, Alfonso appeared for the nation in the 1998 World Cup and two European Championships.

== Club career ==
=== Real Madrid ===
Alfonso was born in Getafe, in the outskirts of Madrid. In 1991, aged just 18, he made his professional debut with Real Madrid and, although he never carved a regular place in the starting XI – playing mostly second-fiddle to Emilio Butragueño first and then Raúl and Iván Zamorano – helped the capital side to the 1995 national championship.

On 2 December 1993, Alfonso scored twice in the first leg of the Supercopa de España, a 3–1 home win against Barcelona at the Santiago Bernabéu Stadium (4–2 on aggregate).

=== Betis and Barcelona ===
In the summer of 1995, Alfonso joined Real Betis. In his second year at the Manuel Ruiz de Lopera, he scored 25 La Liga goals which was the most by a player in a single season in the club's history. Teaming up with Pier, the pair combined for 60 from 1995 to 1997, and helped the Andalusia team finish fourth in the latter campaign.

Alfonso signed with Barcelona for the 2000–01 campaign. The player had a difficult time adjusting at the Camp Nou, netting only twice in his first year and serving a loan spell at French Ligue 1 side Marseille in January 2002, alongside Real Madrid's Alberto Rivera.

Barcelona then loaned Alfonso to his former employers Betis, which signed him permanently at the end of 2002–03. After another two seasons where he struggled with injuries and loss of form (ten scoreless games in 2004–05), he retired from football when his contract expired in June 2005, having scored 112 official goals during his career.

== International career ==
Alfonso appeared in 38 games for Spain, making his debut in a friendly with England on 9 September 1992 in Santander. The most important of his 11 goals was scored against Yugoslavia at UEFA Euro 2000; the team was losing 3–2 in injury time, needing a win to qualify from the group at Norway's expense. In the 90th minute, a penalty was won and converted by Gaizka Mendieta, and with seconds remaining Alfonso volleyed a spectacular shot past Ivica Kralj for his second of the game and the win.

At Euro 1996, Alfonso took part in all of the fixtures, including against Bulgaria in which he scored the equaliser after just one minute on the pitch. Additionally, he played two 1998 FIFA World Cup matches in a group-stage exit in France.

Alfonso was also a member of the national team that won the gold medal at the 1992 Summer Olympics in Barcelona. He scored once during the tournament, in a 2–0 victory over Qatar.

== Style of play ==
Alfonso possessed above-average heading ability, despite not reaching 180 cm.

== Personal life ==
Alfonso was the older brother of fellow footballer Iván Pérez. Both Real Madrid youth graduates, they coincided one season at Betis and reunited at Real Madrid veterans.

Getafe's stadium, the Coliseum Alfonso Pérez, was named after him, despite the fact that he never played professionally for his hometown club. His name was dropped from the facilities in October 2023 after he made disparaging remarks about female footballers in an interview.

== Career statistics ==
Scores and results list Spain's goal tally first, score column indicates score after each Pérez goal.

List of international goals scored by Alfonso Pérez
No.	Date	Venue	Opponent	Score	Result	Competition
1	16 December 1992	Ramón Sánchez-Pizjuán Stadium, Seville, Spain	Latvia	3–0	5–0	1994 FIFA World Cup qualification
2	6 September 1995	Nuevo Estadio de Los Cármenes, Granada, Spain	Cyprus	2–0	6–0	UEFA Euro 1996 qualifying
3	9 June 1996	Elland Road, Leeds, England	Bulgaria	1–1	1–1	UEFA Euro 1996
4	4 September 1996	Svangaskarð, Toftir, Faroe Islands	Faroe Islands	2–1	6–2	1998 FIFA World Cup qualification
5	4 September 1996	Svangaskarð, Toftir, Faroe Islands	Faroe Islands	4–1	6–2	1998 FIFA World Cup qualification
6	4 September 1996	Svangaskarð, Toftir, Faroe Islands	Faroe Islands	6–1	6–2	1998 FIFA World Cup qualification
7	12 February 1997	Estadio José Rico Pérez, Alicante, Spain	Malta	2–0	4–0	1998 FIFA World Cup qualification
8	12 February 1997	Estadio José Rico Pérez, Alicante, Spain	Malta	3–0	4–0	1998 FIFA World Cup qualification
9	29 March 2000	Estadi de Montjuïc, Barcelona, Spain	Italy	1–0	2–0	Friendly
10	21 June 2000	Jan Breydel Stadium, Bruges, Belgium	FR Yugoslavia	1–1	4–3	UEFA Euro 2000
11	21 June 2000	Jan Breydel Stadium, Bruges, Belgium	FR Yugoslavia	4–3	4–3	UEFA Euro 2000

== Honours ==
Real Madrid

- La Liga: 1994–95
- Copa del Rey: 1992–93
- Supercopa de España: 1993

Betis

- Copa del Rey: 2004–05

Spain U23

- Summer Olympic Games: 1992

Individual

- Don Balón Award: 1998
