= 2005 Supercopa de España =

Real Betis	Barcelona
2	4
- on aggregate

First leg
Real Betis	Barcelona
0	3
- Date: 13 August 2005
- Venue: Estadio Manuel Ruiz de Lopera, Seville
- Referee: Arturo Daudén Ibáñez
- Attendance: 25,000

Second leg
Barcelona	Real Betis
1	2
- Date: 20 August 2005
- Venue: Camp Nou, Barcelona
- Referee: Alberto Undiano Mallenco
- Attendance: 48,000

The 2005 Supercopa de España was a two-leg Spanish football match played on 13 and 20 August 2005. It was contested by 2004–05 La Liga champions Barcelona and 2004–05 Copa del Rey winners Real Betis. Barcelona won 4–2 on aggregate.

== Match details ==
=== First leg ===
13 August 2005
22:00 CET

Real Betis	0–3	Barcelona
	Report	Giuly 47'; Eto'o 52'; Ronaldinho 63'

Estadio Manuel Ruiz de Lopera, Seville
Attendance: 25,000
Referee: Arturo Daudén Ibáñez

Real Betis	Barcelona

GK	13	(Spain) Toni Doblas
RB	27	(Spain) Melli
CB	4	(Spain) Juanito (c)	(yellow card) 41'
CB	5	(Spain) David Rivas
LB	2	(Spain) Luis Fernández
DM	25	(Spain) Miguel Ángel	(yellow card) 28'	(substituted off) 82'
RM	17	(Spain) Joaquín
CM	20	(Brazil) Marcos Assunção		(substituted off) 46'
CM	18	(Spain) Alberto Rivera	(yellow card) 59'
LM	24	(Brazil) Edu
CF	12	(Brazil) Ricardo Oliveira		(substituted off) 82'
Subs:
GK	1	(Spain) Pedro Contreras
MF	7	(Spain) Fernando Varela
MF	9	(Spain) Fernando Fernández		(substituted on) 82'
MF	8	(Spain) Arzu		(substituted on) 82'
MF	11	(Brazil) Denílson
FW	6	(Spain) Dani
FW	21	(Spain) Xisco		(substituted on) 46'
Manager:
(Spain) Lorenzo Serra Ferrer

GK	1	(Spain) Víctor Valdés
RB	2	(Brazil) Juliano Belletti
CB	23	(Spain) Oleguer
CB	5	(Spain) Carles Puyol (c)
LB	16	(Brazil) Sylvinho
DM	15	(Brazil) Edmílson		(substituted off) 85'
CM	6	(Spain) Xavi
CM	20	(Portugal) Deco	(yellow card) 57'	(substituted off) 82'
RW	8	(France) Ludovic Giuly	(yellow card) 23'	(substituted off) 70'
LW	10	(Brazil) Ronaldinho
CF	9	(Cameroon) Samuel Eto'o
Subs:
GK	25	(Spain) Albert Jorquera
DF	32	(Spain) Damià
MF	17	(Netherlands) Mark van Bommel		(substituted on) 70'
MF	18	(Spain) Gabri		(substituted on) 85'
MF	24	(Spain) Andrés Iniesta		(substituted on) 82'
FW	7	(Sweden) Henrik Larsson
FW	11	(Argentina) Maxi López
Manager:
(Netherlands) Frank Rijkaard

=== Second leg ===
20 August 2005
22:00 CET

Barcelona	1–2	Real Betis
Eto'o 14'	Report	Dani 24', 29'

Camp Nou, Barcelona
Attendance: 48,000
Referee: Alberto Undiano Mallenco

Barcelona	Real Betis

GK	1	(Spain) Víctor Valdés
RB	2	(Brazil) Juliano Belletti		(substituted off) 46'
CB	23	(Spain) Oleguer
CB	5	(Spain) Carles Puyol (c)
LB	16	(Brazil) Sylvinho
DM	15	(Brazil) Edmílson
CM	6	(Spain) Xavi
CM	20	(Portugal) Deco	(yellow card) 56'	(substituted off) 80'
RW	8	(France) Ludovic Giuly	(yellow card) 39'	(substituted off) 84'
LW	10	(Brazil) Ronaldinho
CF	9	(Cameroon) Samuel Eto'o
Subs:
GK	25	(Spain) Albert Jorquera
DF	4	(Mexico) Rafael Márquez		(substituted on) 46'
DF	12	(Netherlands) Giovanni van Bronckhorst
MF	17	(Netherlands) Mark van Bommel
MF	18	(Spain) Gabri		(substituted on) 80'
MF	24	(Spain) Andrés Iniesta
FW	7	(Sweden) Henrik Larsson		(substituted on) 84'
Manager:
(Netherlands) Frank Rijkaard

GK	1	(Spain) Pedro Contreras
RB	16	(Spain) Óscar López	(yellow card) 76'	(substituted off) 81'
CB	27	(Spain) Melli (c)
CB	15	(Spain) Nano	(yellow card) 52'
LB	22	(Italy) Paolo Castellini
RM	7	(Spain) Fernando Varela		(substituted off) 68'
CM	25	(Spain) Miguel Ángel
CM	8	(Spain) Arzu		(substituted off) 73'
LM	21	(Spain) Xisco
AM	9	(Spain) Fernando Fernández
CF	6	(Spain) Dani
Subs:
GK	13	(Spain) Toni Doblas
DF	3	(Uruguay) Alejandro Lembo		(substituted on) 81'
MF	18	(Spain) Alberto Rivera	(yellow card) 59'	(substituted on) 73'
MF	10	(Spain) Juan José Cañas
MF	14	(Spain) Capi
MF	19	(Spain) Israel		(substituted on) 68'
MF	23	(Spain) Juanlu
Manager:
(Spain) Lorenzo Serra Ferrer

== See also ==
- 2005–06 La Liga
- 2005–06 Copa del Rey
- 2005–06 FC Barcelona season
- 2005–06 Real Betis season
