= 2006–07 Real Betis season =

Real Betis
2006–07 season
- President: Leon Gomez
- Head coach: Luis Fernandez
- La Liga: 16th
- Copa del Rey: Quarter-finals

During the 2006–07 season, Betis finished 16th in La Liga.

== Squad ==
Note: Flags indicate national team as defined under FIFA eligibility rules; some limited exceptions apply. Players may hold more than one non-FIFA nationality.

No.	Pos.	Nation	Player
2	DF	ESP	Nano
3	DF	URU	Alejandro Lembo
4	DF	ESP	Juanito
5	DF	ESP	David Rivas
6	FW	ESP	Daniel
7	FW	ESP	Rivera
8	MF	ESP	Arzu
9	MF	ESP	Fernando
10	MF	ESP	Fernando Vega
11	FW	BRA	Robert
12	FW	BRA	Rafael Sóbis
13	GK	ESP	Pedro Contreras
14	MF	ESP	Capi
17	DF	ESP	Isidoro
19	MF	ESP	Israel

No.	Pos.	Nation	Player
20	MF	BRA	Marcos Assunção
22	DF	ITA	Paolo Castellini
24	FW	BRA	Edú
25	MF	ESP	Oscar López
26	GK	ESP	Juande
27	DF	ESP	Melli
28	FW	ESP	Francisco Javier Muñoz
30	GK	ESP	Toni Doblas
—	DF	SLO	Branko Ilič
—	FW	ARG	Juan Pablo Caffa
—	MF	SUI	Johann Vogel
—	MF	FRA	Fabrice Pancrate
—	MF	BRA	Jorge Wagner
—	DF	ESP	Enrique Romero
—	MF	GER	David Odonkor

== Competitions ==
=== La Liga ===
==== League table ====
Pos	Team	Pld	W	D	L	GF	GA	GD	Pts	Qualification or relegation
14	Osasuna	38	13	7	18	51	49	+2	46	
15	Levante	38	10	12	16	38	54	−16	42	
16	Real Betis	38	8	16	14	36	49	−13	40 (Note: BET 3–0 ATH; ATH 1–2 BET)	
17	Athletic Bilbao	38	10	10	18	44	62	−18	40	
18	Celta (R)	38	10	9	19	40	59	−19	39	Relegation to the Segunda División

Source: LFP
Rules for classification: 1st points; 2nd head-to-head points; 3rd head-to-head goal difference; 4th head-to-head goals scored; 5th goal difference; 6th number of goals scored; 7th Fair-play points
(R) Relegated

=== Copa del Rey ===
- Team listed first were the home team in the first leg

Round of 32
Athletic Bilbao	1	1	2
Mallorca (AET)	1	2	3
Deportivo	1	0	1 (3)
Racing (PSO)	0	1	1 (1)
Real Valladolid	1	3	4
Gimnàstic de Tarragona	0	1	1
Castellón	0	0	0
Villarreal	2	2	4
Espanyol	1	0	1
Rayo Vallecano	1	1	2
Gimnástica Segoviana	0	0	0
Sevilla	1	3	4
Recreativo	0	0	0
Real Betis	0	2	2
Écija Balompié	1	1	2
Real Madrid	1	5	6
Deportivo Alavés	0	1	1
Celta Vigo	0	0	0
Badalona	1	0	1
Barcelona	2	4	6
Málaga	4	1	5
Real Sociedad	1	2	3
Hércules	1	0	1
Real Zaragoza	1	2	3
Xerez	0	2	2
Getafe	2	1	3
Portuense	1	0	1
Valencia	2	2	4
Peña Sport	0	0	0
Osasuna	0	4	4
Atlético Madrid	0	1	1 (4)
Levante (PSO)	1	0	1 (2)

Round of 16
Mallorca	1	1	2
Deportivo	2	1	3
Real Valladolid	2	1	3
Villarreal	1	0	1
Rayo Vallecano	0	1	1
Sevilla	0	3	3
Real Betis (AG)	0	1	1
Real Madrid	0	1	1
Deportivo Alavés	0	2	2
Barcelona	2	3	5
Málaga	0	1	1
Real Zaragoza	3	0	3
Getafe	1	4	5
Valencia	1	2	3
Atlético Madrid	1	0	1
Osasuna	1	2	3

Quarterfinals
Deportivo	4	1	5
Real Valladolid	1	1	2
Sevilla	0	1	1
Real Betis *	0	0	0
Barcelona (AG)	0	2	2
Real Zaragoza	1	1	2
Getafe	3	0	3
Osasuna	0	1	1

Semifinals
Deportivo	0	0	0
Sevilla	2	3	5
Barcelona	5	0	5
Getafe	2	4	6

Final
Sevilla	1
Getafe	0

* Match abandoned after 57 minutes at 0–1 due to injury of Sevilla coach Juande Ramos; remainder of the game played on 18 March at the Coliseum, Getafe.
