= 2005–06 Real Betis season =

Real Betis
2005–06 season
- President: Manuel Ruiz de Lopera
- Head coach: Lorenzo Serra Ferrer
- La Liga: 14th
- Copa del Rey: Quarter-finals
- Champions League: Group stage
- UEFA Cup: Round of 16
Home colours	Away colours	Third colours

During the 2005–06 season, Betis finished 14th in the La Liga.

== Squad ==
Note: Flags indicate national team as defined under FIFA eligibility rules; some limited exceptions apply. Players may hold more than one non-FIFA nationality.

No.	Pos.	Nation	Player
2	DF	ESP	Nano Rivas
3	DF	URU	Alejandro Lembo
4	DF	ESP	Juanito
5	DF	ESP	David Rivas
6	FW	ESP	Daniel Martín Alexandre
7	DF	ESP	Fernando Varela
8	MF	ESP	Arzu
9	MF	ESP	Fernando Fernández
10	MF	ESP	Juanlu
11	MF	BRA	Denílson
12	FW	BRA	Ricardo Oliveira
13	GK	ESP	Pedro Contreras

No.	Pos.	Nation	Player
14	MF	ESP	Capi
17	MF	ESP	Joaquín
19	MF	ESP	Israel Bascón
20	MF	BRA	Marcos Assunção
22	DF	ITA	Paolo Castellini
24	FW	BRA	Edu
25	MF	ESP	Óscar López
26	DF	ESP	Juande
27	DF	ESP	Melli
28	FW	ESP	Xisco Muñoz
30	GK	ESP	Toni Doblas
31	FW	ESP	Alberto Rivera

== Competitions ==
=== La Liga ===
==== League table ====
Pos	Team	Pld	W	D	L	GF	GA	GD	Pts	Qualification or relegation
12	Athletic Bilbao	38	11	12	15	40	46	−6	45	
13	Mallorca	38	10	13	15	37	51	−14	43	
14	Real Betis	38	10	12	16	34	51	−17	42	
15	Espanyol	38	10	11	17	36	56	−20	41	Qualification for the UEFA Cup first round (Note: Espanyol qualified for the UEFA Cup first round as the 2005–06 Copa del Rey winners.)
16	Real Sociedad	38	11	7	20	48	65	−17	40	

Source: LFP
Rules for classification: 1st points; 2nd head-to-head points; 3rd head-to-head goal difference; 4th head-to-head goals scored; 5th goal difference; 6th number of goals scored; 7th Fair-play points
