= 2007–08 Real Betis season =

Real Betis
2007–08 season
- President: Leon Gomez
- Head coach: Hector Cuper
- La Liga: 13th
- Copa del Rey: Round of 16

During the 2007–08 season, Betis finished 13th in the La Liga.

== Squad ==
Note: Flags indicate national team as defined under FIFA eligibility rules; some limited exceptions apply. Players may hold more than one non-FIFA nationality.

No.	Pos.	Nation	Player
1	GK	POR	Ricardo Pereira
2	DF	ESP	Melli
3	MF	ESP	Fernando Vega
4	DF	ESP	Juanito
5	DF	ESP	David Rivas
6	DF	SVN	Branko Ilič
7	FW	ARG	Juan Pablo Caffa
8	MF	ESP	Arzu
9	MF	ESP	Fernando
10	FW	BRA	Edú
11	MF	CHI	Mark González
12	MF	ESP	Damià Abella
13	GK	ESP	Casto (footballer)
14	MF	ESP	Capi
15	DF	ESP	Nano
16	FW	ARG	Mariano Pavone

No.	Pos.	Nation	Player
17	MF	CRO	Marko Babić
18	FW	ESP	Rivera
19	MF	ESP	Xisco
20	MF	ARG	Somoza
21	FW	BRA	Rafael Sóbis
22	DF	BRA	Willian Lanes de Lima
23	MF	GER	David Odonkor
24	FW	ESP	José Mari
25	GK	ESP	Toni Doblas
27	MF	ESP	Juande
28	GK	ESP	René
29	MF	ESP	Alejandro Zamora
30	DF	ESP	Isidoro
31	MF	ESP	Rodri
32	DF	ESP	Toni
33	DF	ESP	Ález Ortiz

== Competitions ==
=== La Liga ===
==== League table ====
Pos	Team	Pld	W	D	L	GF	GA	GD	Pts
11	Athletic Bilbao	38	13	11	14	40	43	−3	50
12	Espanyol	38	13	9	16	43	53	−10	48
13	Real Betis	38	12	11	15	45	51	−6	47 (Note: BET 3–2 GET; GET 1–1 BET)
14	Getafe	38	12	11	15	44	48	−4	47
15	Valladolid	38	11	12	15	42	57	−15	45

Source: LFP
Rules for classification: 1st points; 2nd head-to-head points; 3rd head-to-head goal difference; 4th head-to-head goals scored; 5th goal difference; 6th number of goals scored; 7th Fair-play points
