= 2009–10 Real Betis season =

Real Betis
2009–10 season
- President: José León Gómez
- Head coach: Antonio Tapia (until January); Víctor Fernández (from January)
- Stadium: Manuel Ruiz de Lopera
- Segunda División: 4th
- Copa del Rey: Second round
- Top goalscorer: League: Sergio García (12); All: Sergio García (12)
- Average home league attendance: 28,730
| Home colours | Away colours | Third colours |

The 2009–10 season was the 103rd in the history of Real Betis and their first season back in the second division since 2001. The club participated in Segunda División and the Copa del Rey.

== Players ==
Note: Flags indicate national team as defined under FIFA eligibility rules; some limited exceptions apply. Players may hold more than one non-FIFA nationality.

| No. | Pos. | Nation | Player |
|---|---|---|---|
| 1 | GK | POR | Ricardo |
| 2 | DF | ESP | Melli |
| 3 | DF | ESP | Fernando Vega |
| 4 | DF | ESP | Nano |
| 5 | DF | ESP | David Rivas |
| 7 | MF | ESP | Juanma |
| 8 | MF | ESP | Arzu |
| 9 | FW | ESP | Sergio García |
| 10 | MF | ESP | Sunny (on loan from Valencia) |
| 11 | MF | ARG | Juan Pablo Caffa |
| 12 | MF | ESP | Damià |
| 13 | GK | ESP | Casto |
| 14 | MF | ESP | Capi |

| No. | Pos. | Nation | Player |
|---|---|---|---|
| 15 | MF | TUR | Mehmet Aurélio |
| 16 | FW | ARG | Mariano Pavone |
| 17 | MF | GER | David Odonkor |
| 18 | MF | BRA | Iriney |
| 19 | FW | ESP | Jonathan Pereira |
| 20 | MF | CMR | Achille Emana |
| 21 | DF | ESP | Carlos García (on loan from Almería) |
| 22 | DF | POR | Nélson |
| 23 | MF | ESP | Nacho |
| 25 | GK | ESP | Iñaki Goitia |
| 27 | MF | ESP | Juande |
| 29 | MF | ESP | Rodri |
| 31 | MF | ESP | Israel |

== Pre-season and friendlies ==
Win Draw Loss Fixtures

| 8 August 2009 Friendly | Zaragoza (Spain) | 2–4 | (Spain) Real Betis | Spain |
| 22:00 CEST (UTC+2) | | Report |

| 13 August 2009 Friendly | Murcia (Spain) | 0–0 | (Spain) Real Betis | Spain |
| 21:00 CEST (UTC+2) | | Report |

| 15 August 2009 Friendly | Real Betis (Spain) | 0–1 | (Spain) CD Tenerife | Spain |
| --:-- CEST (UTC+2) | | Report |

== Competitions ==
=== Overall record ===
| Competition | First match | Last match | Starting round | Final position | Record | | | | | | | |
| Competition | First match | Last match | Starting round | Final position | Pld | W | D | L | GF | GA | GD | Win % |
|---|---|---|---|---|---|---|---|---|---|---|---|---|
| Segunda División | 29 August 2009 | 19 June 2010 | Matchday 1 | 4th | 42 | 19 | 14 | 9 | 61 | 38 | +23 | 45.24 |
| Copa del Rey | September 2009 | | Second round | Second round | 1 | 0 | 0 | 1 | 1 | 2 | −1 | 0.00 |
| Total | | | | | 43 | 19 | 14 | 10 | 62 | 40 | +22 | 44.19 |

Source: Competitions

=== Segunda División ===
==== League table ====
| Pos | Team | Pld | W | D | L | GF | GA | GD | Pts | Promotion or relegation |
|---|---|---|---|---|---|---|---|---|---|---|
| 2 | Hércules (P) | 42 | 19 | 14 | 9 | 61 | 34 | +27 | 71 (Note: HÉR: 7 pts; LEV: 6 pts; BET: 4 pts) | Promotion to La Liga |
| 3 | Levante (P) | 42 | 19 | 14 | 9 | 63 | 45 | +18 | 71 | Promotion to La Liga |
| 4 | Betis | 42 | 19 | 14 | 9 | 61 | 38 | +23 | 71 | |
| 5 | Cartagena | 42 | 18 | 11 | 13 | 58 | 49 | +9 | 65 | |
| 6 | Elche | 42 | 18 | 9 | 15 | 67 | 57 | +10 | 63 | |

Source: LFP – Liga Adelante
Rules for classification: 1st points; 2nd head-to-head points; 3rd head-to-head goal difference; 4th head-to-head goals scored; 5th goal difference; 6th number of goals scored; 7th Fair-play points
(P) Promoted

==== Results summary ====
| Overall | | | | | | | | Home | | | | | | Away | | | | | |
| Pld | W | D | L | GF | GA | GD | Pts | W | D | L | GF | GA | GD | W | D | L | GF | GA | GD |
|---|---|---|---|---|---|---|---|---|---|---|---|---|---|---|---|---|---|---|---|
| 42 | 19 | 14 | 9 | 61 | 38 | +23 | 71 | 12 | 7 | 2 | 36 | 10 | +26 | 7 | 7 | 7 | 25 | 28 | −3 |

Source: BDFutbol

==== Matches ====
| 29 August 2009 1 | Real Betis | 3–0 | Córdoba | Seville |
| --:-- CEST (UTC+2) | | | | Stadium: Manuel Ruiz de Lopera |

| 6 September 2009 2 | Hércules | 3–2 | Real Betis | Alicante |
| --:-- CEST (UTC+2) |

| 13 September 2009 3 | Real Betis | 3–0 | Recreativo de Huelva | Seville |
| --:-- CEST (UTC+2) | | | | Stadium: Manuel Ruiz de Lopera |

| 20 September 2009 4 | Albacete | 1–3 | Real Betis | Albacete |
| --:-- CEST (UTC+2) |

| 27 September 2009 5 | Real Betis | 0–0 | Cartagena | Seville |
| --:-- CEST (UTC+2) | | | | Stadium: Manuel Ruiz de Lopera |

| 4 October 2009 6 | Rayo Vallecano | 2–2 | Real Betis | Madrid |
| --:-- CEST (UTC+2) |

| 11 October 2009 7 | Real Betis | 1–1 | Real Unión | Seville |
| --:-- CEST (UTC+2) | | | | Stadium: Manuel Ruiz de Lopera |

| 17 October 2009 8 | Castellón | 1–0 | Real Betis | Castellón de la Plana |
| --:-- CEST (UTC+2) |

| 24 October 2009 9 | Girona | 0–2 | Real Betis | Girona |
| --:-- CEST (UTC+2) |

| 2 December 2009 10 | Real Betis | 4–0 | Villarreal B | Seville |
| --:-- CEST (UTC+2) | | | | Stadium: Manuel Ruiz de Lopera |

| 8 November 2009 11 | Cádiz | 2–2 | Real Betis | Cádiz |
| --:-- CEST (UTC+2) |

| 15 November 2009 12 | Real Betis | 1–1 | Celta Vigo | Seville |
| --:-- CEST (UTC+2) | | | | Stadium: Manuel Ruiz de Lopera |

| 22 November 2009 13 | Elche | 3–0 | Real Betis | Elche |
| --:-- CEST (UTC+2) |

| 29 November 2009 14 | Real Betis | 1–0 | Las Palmas | Seville |
| --:-- CEST (UTC+2) | | | | Stadium: Manuel Ruiz de Lopera |

| 6 December 2009 15 | Murcia | 2–0 | Real Betis | Murcia |
| --:-- CEST (UTC+2) |

| 13 December 2009 16 | Real Betis | 3–0 | Gimnàstic | Seville |
| --:-- CEST (UTC+2) | | | | Stadium: Manuel Ruiz de Lopera |

| 20 December 2009 17 | Real Sociedad | 2–0 | Real Betis | San Sebastián |
| --:-- CEST (UTC+2) |

| 2 January 2010 18 | Real Betis | 1–1 | Huesca | Seville |
| --:-- CEST (UTC+2) | | | | Stadium: Manuel Ruiz de Lopera |

| 9 January 2010 19 | Numancia | 3–0 | Real Betis | Soria |
| --:-- CEST (UTC+2) |

| 16 January 2010 20 | Real Betis | 1–0 | Salamanca | Seville |
| --:-- CEST (UTC+2) | | | | Stadium: Manuel Ruiz de Lopera |

| 24 January 2010 21 | Levante | 1–0 | Real Betis | Valencia |
| --:-- CEST (UTC+2) |

| 31 January 2010 22 | Córdoba | 0–1 | Real Betis | Córdoba |
| --:-- CEST (UTC+2) |

| 7 February 2010 23 | Real Betis | 1–1 | Hércules | Seville |
| --:-- CEST (UTC+2) | | | | Stadium: Manuel Ruiz de Lopera |

| 13 February 2010 24 | Recreativo de Huelva | 1–1 | Real Betis | Huelva |
| --:-- CEST (UTC+2) |

| 20 February 2010 25 | Real Betis | 0–0 | Albacete | Seville |
| --:-- CEST (UTC+2) | | | | Stadium: Manuel Ruiz de Lopera |

| 28 February 2010 26 | Cartagena | 1–2 | Real Betis | Cartagena |
| --:-- CEST (UTC+2) |

| 7 March 2010 27 | Real Betis | 3–1 | Rayo Vallecano | Seville |
| --:-- CEST (UTC+2) | | | | Stadium: Manuel Ruiz de Lopera |

| 13 March 2010 28 | Real Unión | 1–3 | Real Betis | Irun |
| --:-- CEST (UTC+2) |

| 22 March 2010 29 | Real Betis | 2–0 | Castellón | Seville |
| --:-- CEST (UTC+2) | | | | Stadium: Manuel Ruiz de Lopera |

| 27 March 2010 30 | Real Betis | 0–1 | Girona | Seville |
| --:-- CEST (UTC+2) | | | | Stadium: Manuel Ruiz de Lopera |

| 5 April 2010 31 | Villarreal B | 2–2 | Real Betis | Villarreal |
| --:-- CEST (UTC+2) |

| 10 April 2010 32 | Real Betis | 4–0 | Cádiz | Seville |
| --:-- CEST (UTC+2) | | | | Stadium: Manuel Ruiz de Lopera |

| 18 April 2010 33 | Celta Vigo | 1–1 | Real Betis | Vigo |
| --:-- CEST (UTC+2) |

| 24 April 2010 34 | Real Betis | 0–3 | Elche | Seville |
| --:-- CEST (UTC+2) | | | | Stadium: Manuel Ruiz de Lopera |

| 1 May 2010 35 | Las Palmas | 1–1 | Real Betis | Las Palmas |
| --:-- CEST (UTC+2) |

| 9 May 2010 36 | Real Betis | 1–1 | Murcia | Seville |
| --:-- CEST (UTC+2) | | | | Stadium: Manuel Ruiz de Lopera |

| 15 May 2010 37 | Gimnàstic | 0–1 | Real Betis | Tarragona |
| --:-- CEST (UTC+2) |

| 23 May 2010 38 | Real Betis | 1–0 | Real Sociedad | Seville |
| --:-- CEST (UTC+2) | Emaná 72' (pen.) | | | Stadium: Manuel Ruiz de Lopera; Referee: Lizondo Cortés |

| 29 May 2010 39 | Huesca | 0–1 | Real Betis | Huesca |
| --:-- CEST (UTC+2) | | | Juanma 90' | Stadium: Estadio El Alcoraz; Referee: Iglesias Villanueva |

| 5 June 2010 40 | Real Betis | 2–0 | Numancia | Seville |
| --:-- CEST (UTC+2) | | | | Stadium: Manuel Ruiz de Lopera |

| 13 June 2010 41 | Salamanca | 1–1 | Real Betis | Salamanca |
| --:-- CEST (UTC+2) |

| 19 June 2010 42 | Real Betis | 4–0 | Levante | Seville |
| --:-- CEST (UTC+2) | | | | Stadium: Manuel Ruiz de Lopera |

=== Copa del Rey ===
| September 2009 Second round | Real Betis | 1–2 | Córdoba | Seville |
| --:-- CEST (UTC+2) | | | | Stadium: Manuel Ruiz de Lopera |
