= Iñaki Goitia =

Spanish footballer (born 1982)

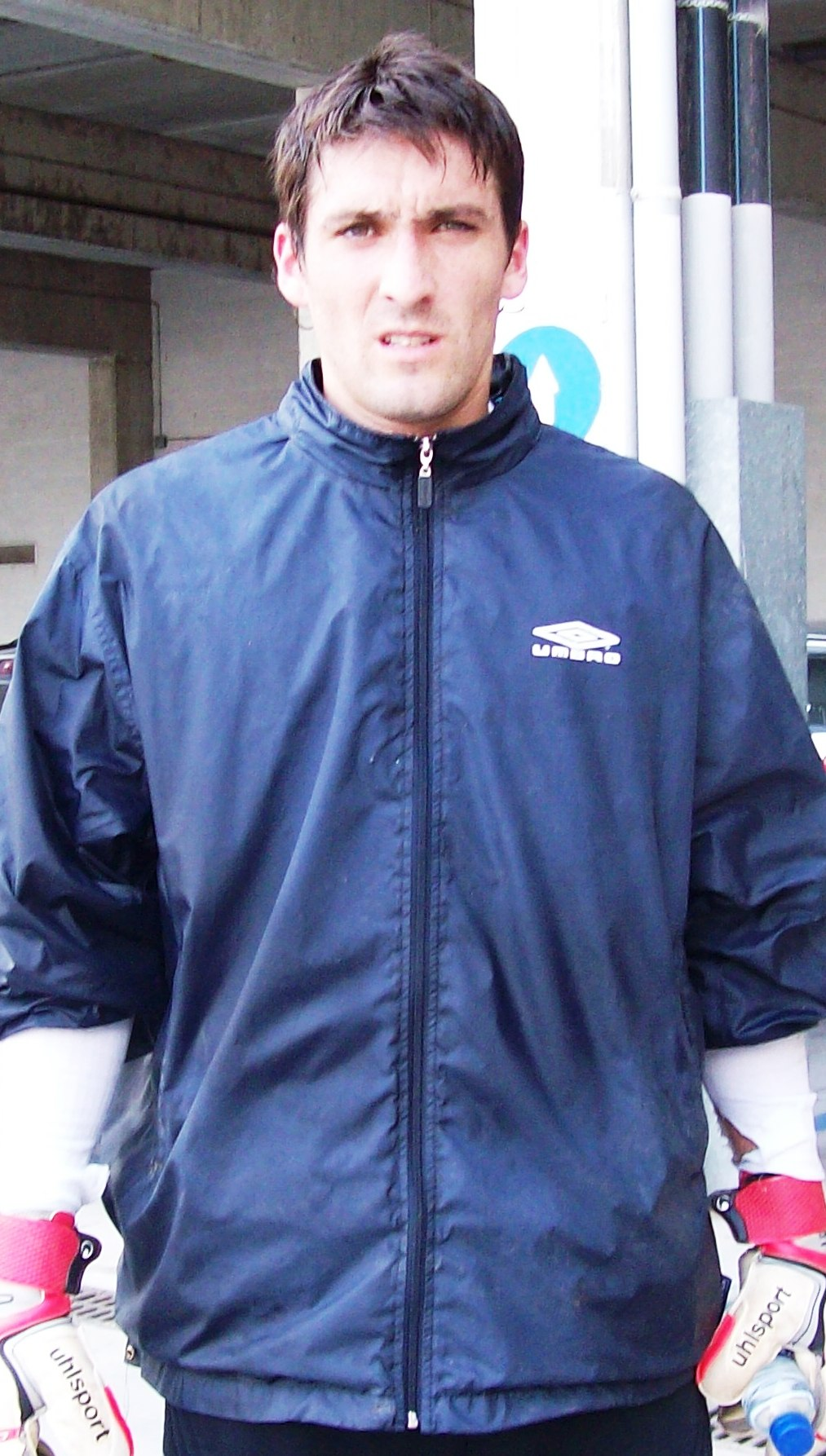
- Goitia with Málaga in 2009

Personal information
- Full name: Iñaki Goitia Peña
- Date of birth: 2 March 1982 (age 44)
- Place of birth: Barakaldo, Spain
- Height: 1.88 m (6 ft 2 in)
- Position: Goalkeeper

Youth career
- Danok Bat

Senior career*
Years	Team	Apps	(Gls)
2000–2001	Amorebieta		
2001–2002	Amurrio	8	(0)
2003	Burgos	13	(0)
2003–2005	Málaga B	58	(0)
2005–2009	Málaga	83	(0)
2009–2012	Betis	69	(0)
2012–2013	Mirandés	41	(0)
2013–2015	Alavés	43	(0)
Total		315	(0)
- * Club domestic league appearances and goals

Iñaki Goitia Peña (born 2 March 1982) is a Spanish former footballer who played as a goalkeeper.

He spent most of his professional career in Segunda División, totalling 265 appearances for Málaga B, Málaga, Betis, Mirandés and Alavés. He added 29 La Liga matches over three seasons, in representation of the second and third clubs.

== Club career ==
Goitia was born in Barakaldo, Biscay. After starting with modest clubs in the Basque region, he moved in 2003–04 to Málaga CF, spending his first two years with the B side in the Segunda División. In February 2006 he made two La Liga appearances, in two defeats in which he conceded seven goals; the season ended in relegation, while the reserves also dropped down a tier.

In 2007–08, Goitia finally won the battle for first-choice status over longtime incumbent Francesc Arnau, appearing in 41 out of 42 games as the Andalusians returned to the top flight after two years. The following campaign, however, the latter began as the starter but, after some costly mistakes, the former was reinstated.

Late during the season, despite having a contract running until 30 June 2009, Goitia refused to play against his future club Real Betis fearing that he would be criticised if he allowed goals (as his future team was fighting to avoid relegation). The four-year deal was officialized in early June 2009, and he featured in 25 matches in his second year as they returned to the top division as champions.

After three more seasons in division two, with CD Mirandés and Deportivo Alavés, Goitia retired at the age of 33 to dedicate himself to his family.

== Career statistics ==
Appearances and goals by club, season and competition
Club	Season	League			National Cup		Other		Total	
Club	Season	Division	Apps	Goals	Apps	Goals	Apps	Goals	Apps	Goals
Amurrio	2002–03	Segunda División B	8	0	3	0	—		11	0
Burgos	2002–03	Segunda División B	7	0	—		6	0	13	0
Málaga B	2003–04	Segunda División	20	0	—		—		20	0
Málaga B	2004–05	Segunda División	38	0	—		—		38	0
Málaga B	Total		58	0	—		—		58	0
Málaga	2003–04	La Liga	0	0	0	0	—		0	0
Málaga	2004–05	La Liga	0	0	0	0	—		0	0
Málaga	2005–06	La Liga	2	0	1	0	—		3	0
Málaga	2006–07	Segunda División	15	0	5	0	—		20	0
Málaga	2007–08	Segunda División	41	0	0	0	—		41	0
Málaga	2008–09	La Liga	25	0	2	0	—		27	0
Málaga	Total		83	0	8	0	—		91	0
Betis	2009–10	Segunda División	42	0	0	0	—		7	0
Betis	2010–11	Segunda División	25	0	1	0	—		5	0
Betis	2011–12	La Liga	2	0	1	0	—		4	0
Betis	Total		69	0	2	0	—		71	0
Mirandés	2011–12	Segunda División	41	0	0	0	—		41	0
Alavés	2013–14	Segunda División	30	0	0	0	—		30	0
Alavés	2014–15	Segunda División	13	0	4	0	—		17	0
Alavés	Total		43	0	4	0	—		47	0
Career total			315	0	17	0	6	0	328	0

== Honours ==
Betis

- Segunda División: 2010–11
