= Pedro Contreras =

Spanish footballer (born 1972)

Personal information
- Full name: Pedro Contreras González
- Date of birth: 7 January 1972 (age 54)
- Place of birth: Madrid, Spain
- Height: 1.80 m (5 ft 11 in)
- Position: Goalkeeper

Youth career
- Real Madrid

Senior career*
Years	Team	Apps	(Gls)
1992–1996	Real Madrid B	44	(0)
1994–1999	Real Madrid	4	(0)
1996–1997	→ Rayo Vallecano (loan)	41	(0)
1999–2003	Málaga	146	(0)
2003–2008	Betis	55	(0)
2007–2008	→ Cádiz (loan)	36	(0)
Total		326	(0)

International career
2002	Spain	1	(0)
- * Club domestic league appearances and goals

Pedro Contreras González (born 7 January 1972) is a Spanish retired footballer who played as a goalkeeper.

He played in 246 La Liga games over the course of 13 seasons, representing in the competition Real Madrid, Rayo Vallecano, Málaga and Betis.

Contreras was called up for Spain at the 2002 World Cup.

== Club career ==
A product of Real Madrid's youth system, Madrid-born Contreras picked up a UEFA Champions League winner's medal in 1998, even though he did not play a minute during the season. He spent four years with the B-side, Real Madrid Castilla, and appeared in four first-team games in the 1998–99 campaign as the former finished runner-up; for 1996–97, he was loaned out to Rayo Vallecano where he only missed one league match in 42, being however relegated from La Liga.

Contreras moved to Málaga in the 1999–2000 season. There, he was the undisputed first-choice, missing only six top division contests from 1999 to 2003.

Contreras signed for Real Betis in the summer of 2003, making 22 league appearances during his debut campaign but none in the following due to injury and the rise of Toni Doblas. In 2005–06, he competed in both the UEFA Cup and the Champions League, where he kept a clean sheet against Chelsea in a 1–0 group stage win.

Loaned to Cádiz (also in Andalusia, Segunda División) for 2007–08, alongside Dani, Contreras was released at the end of the season. He subsequently retired from the game, and rejoined former club Málaga as a goalkeeping coach. He resigned from his post on 18 January, 2020.

== International career ==
Contreras was third-choice for the Spain national team in the 2002 FIFA World Cup, a late addition to coach José Antonio Camacho's squad after first-choice Santiago Cañizares was injured in a freak accident. He received his only cap in a 0–0 home draw against Paraguay in Logroño, on 16 October of that year.

== Career statistics ==
=== Club ===
Appearances and goals by club, season and competition
Club	Season	League			Cup		Europe		Other		Total	
Club	Season	Division	Apps	Goals	Apps	Goals	Apps	Goals	Apps	Goals	Apps	Goals
Real Madrid B	1992–93	Segunda División	4	0	—		—		—		37	0
Real Madrid B	1993–94	Segunda División	19	0	—		—		—		36	0
Real Madrid B	1995–96	Segunda División	21	0	—		—		—		39	0
Real Madrid B	Total		44	0	—		—		—		44	0
Real Madrid	1994–95	La Liga	0	0	0	0	0	0	—		0	0
Real Madrid	1995–96	La Liga	0	0	0	0	0	0	0	0	0	0
Real Madrid	1997–98	La Liga	0	0	0	0	0	0	0	0	0	0
Real Madrid	1998–99	La Liga	4	0	3	0	0	0	0	0	7	0
Real Madrid	Total		4	0	3	0	0	0	0	0	7	0
Rayo Vallecano (loan)	1996–97	Segunda División	41	0	—		—		2	0	43	0
Málaga	1999–2000	La Liga	37	0	0	0	—		—		37	0
Málaga	2000–01	La Liga	36	0	0	0	—		—		36	0
Málaga	2001–02	La Liga	37	0	2	0	—		—		39	0
Málaga	2002–03	La Liga	36	0	2	0	16	0	—		54	0
Málaga	Total		146	0	4	0	16	0	—		166	0
Betis	2003–04	La Liga	22	0	1	0	—		—		23	0
Betis	2004–05	La Liga	0	0	4	0	—		—		4	0
Betis	2005–06	La Liga	17	0	0	0	4	0	1	0	22	0
Betis	2006–07	La Liga	16	0	5	0	—		—		21	0
Betis	Total		55	0	10	0	4	0	1	0	70	0
Cádiz (loan)	2007–08	Segunda División	36	0	0	0	—		—		36	0
Career total			326	0	17	0	20	0	3	0	366	0

== Honours ==
Real Madrid

- Supercopa de España: 1997
- UEFA Champions League: 1997–98

Málaga

- UEFA Intertoto Cup: 2002

Betis

- Copa del Rey: 2004–05
