= David Odonkor =

German footballer (born 1984)

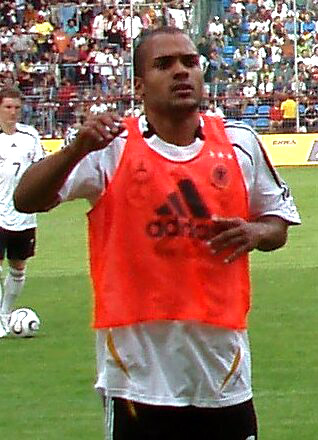
- Odonkor warming up with Germany in 2006

Personal information
- Full name: David Odonkor
- Date of birth: 21 February 1984 (age 42)
- Place of birth: Bünde, West Germany
- Height: 1.72 m (5 ft 8 in)
- Position: Winger

Youth career
- 1991–1995: JSG Holsen-Ahle
- 1995–1998: Bünder SV
- 1998–2001: Borussia Dortmund

Senior career*
Years	Team	Apps	(Gls)
2001–2005	Borussia Dortmund II	49	(7)
2002–2006	Borussia Dortmund	75	(2)
2006–2011	Betis	51	(2)
2011–2012	Alemannia Aachen	23	(2)
2012–2013	Hoverla Uzhhorod	14	(2)
2021	TuS Bövinghausen	13	(1)
2022–2023	SC Düsseldorf-West	0	(0)
Total		212	(15)

International career
2004–2007	Germany U21	15	(3)
2006–2008	Germany	16	(1)

Managerial career
- 2013–2014: SC Verl (assistant)
- 2014–2015: SC Herford (assistant)
- 2015: TuS Dornberg
- 2015–2017: Hammer SpVg (director of football)
Medal record
Men's football
Representing Germany
FIFA World Cup
Third place	2006 Germany
UEFA European Championship
Runner-up	2008 Austria-Switzerland
- * Club domestic league appearances and goals

David Odonkor (born 21 February 1984) is a German former professional footballer who played as a right winger.

He started playing professionally with Borussia Dortmund, appearing in 90 competitive matches. Since leaving Dortmund, however, Odonkor's career was blighted by injury. He played for Real Betis in Spain, Alemannia Aachen in the German second tier and Hoverla Uzhhorod in Ukraine before retiring. When fit, he is known for his top speed and acceleration.

Odonkor represented the Germany national team in one World Cup and one European Championship.

== Club career ==
=== Borussia Dortmund ===
Odonkor was born in Bünde, North Rhine-Westphalia, to a German mother and a Ghanaian father. A product of Borussia Dortmund's youth ranks, he made his first-team debut on 3 March 2002, having recently turned 18, coming on as a second-half substitute in a 1–1 home draw against FC St. Pauli. After splitting the following season with the first and second teams he was definitely promoted for 2003–04, helping Borussia to a final sixth place in the Bundesliga.

In the 2005–06 season Odonkor was everpresent, only missing one league game. On 26 November 2005, he scored and assisted alike in a 2–1 success at 1. FC Nürnberg and, subsequently, he attracted attention from Real Betis, eventually signing for a €6 million fee. He left Borussia after two additional appearances in the 2006–07 season.

=== Real Betis ===
Odonkor's first season at Betis was unassuming, as he appeared in only 13 La Liga matches due to a serious knee injury. The second year began promisingly, but another knee ailment forced him out for another three months.

Upon his return Odonkor appeared regularly for the Andalusians, mainly from the bench. On 4 May 2008, as a starter, he scored his first goal in a 1–1 away draw against UD Almería; in July, after returning to Germany for surgery, he was forced to sign a document by club owner Manuel Ruiz de Lopera by which his contract could inclusively be unilaterally terminated if he returned later than expected.

Having made his way back into the German squad and the Betis starting lineup, Odonkor would however undergo surgery on his knee for a third time in the country, only being reinstated during the 2008–09 winter transfer window. Late into 2009, with the side now in the second division, he relapsed again and missed the remainder of the season.

Betis returned to the Spanish top flight at the end of 2010–11, but Odonkor played no part in the club's campaign, again due to injury.

=== Later years ===
On 28 July 2011, Odonkor arrived at Scottish Premier League side Rangers for a week-long trial, after his contract at Betis came to an end. However, he was ultimately not given a deal, and returned to his country after five years, signing with Alemannia Aachen in the second level.

In the 2012 summer, after his team's relegation, Odonkor moved to FC Hoverla Uzhhorod in the Ukrainian Premier League. In September 2013, after another lengthy injury layoff, the 29-year-old retired from football.

== International career ==
Odonkor was involved in two UEFA European Under-16 Championship editions, 2000 and 2001, managing to score against Romania in the latter, an 8–2 win. On both occasions Germany lost in the quarter-finals, on penalty shootouts.

After appearing at under-19 level, Odonkor would nonetheless be left out of the under-21 squad that appeared at Euro 2006 in Portugal, due to having received a surprise call-up by Jürgen Klinsmann for the 2006 FIFA World Cup. He made his full debut on 30 May 2006 in a friendly match with Japan, going on to appear as a substitute in four World Cup games, most notably against Poland in the group stage where he displayed an excellent performance and assisted Oliver Neuville's winning goal in stoppage time.

Despite his problems with injuries at Betis, Odonkor was called up to UEFA Euro 2008 by Joachim Löw, where he featured 45 minutes in the 1–2 loss to Croatia. Overall he won sixteen caps for Germany.

== Career statistics ==
=== Club ===
Appearances and goals by club, season and competition
Club	Season	League			National cup (Note: Includes DFB-Pokal, Copa del Rey)		League cup (Note: Includes DFB Liga-Pokal)		Europe		Total	
Club	Season	Division	Apps	Goals	Apps	Goals	Apps	Goals	Apps	Goals	Apps	Goals
Borussia Dortmund II	2001–02	Oberliga Westfalia	14	2	—		—		—		14	2
Borussia Dortmund II	2002–03	Regionalliga Nord	18	2	—		—		—		18	2
Borussia Dortmund II	2003–04	Regionalliga Nord	9	2	—		—		—		9	2
Borussia Dortmund II	2004–05	Regionalliga Nord	6	1	—		—		—		6	1
Borussia Dortmund II	2005–06	Oberliga Westfalia	3	0	—		—		—		3	0
Borussia Dortmund II	Total		50	7	—		—		—		50	7
Borussia Dortmund	2001–02	Bundesliga	2	0	0	0	—		1 (Note: Appearances in UEFA Cup)	0	3	0
Borussia Dortmund	2002–03	Bundesliga	6	0	0	0	—		1 (Note: Appearances in UEFA Champions League)	0	7	0
Borussia Dortmund	2003–04	Bundesliga	24	1	1	0	2	0	3 (Note: Appearances in UEFA Cup and UEFA Intertoto Cup)	0	30	1
Borussia Dortmund	2004–05	Bundesliga	7	0	0	0	2	0	2 (Note: Appearances in UEFA Intertoto Cup)	1	11	1
Borussia Dortmund	2005–06	Bundesliga	33	1	1	0	—		2	0	36	1
Borussia Dortmund	2006–07	Bundesliga	2	0	0	0	—		—		2	0
Borussia Dortmund	Total		74	2	2	0	4	0	9	1	89	3
Betis	2006–07	La Liga	13	0	2	0	—		—		15	0
Betis	2007–08	La Liga	20	1	0	0	—		—		20	1
Betis	2008–09	La Liga	7	0	0	0	—		—		7	0
Betis	2009–10	Segunda División	11	1	1	0	—		—		12	1
Betis	2010–11	Segunda División	0	0	0	0	—		—		0	0
Betis	Total		51	2	3	0	—		—		54	2
Alemannia Aachen	2011–12	2. Bundesliga	23	2	0	0	—		—		23	2
Hoverla Uzhhorod	2012–13	Ukrainian Premier League	14	2	0	0	—		—		14	2
TuS Bövinghausen	2021–22	Westfalenliga	13	1	—		—		—		13	1
Career total			225	16	5	0	4	0	9	1	243	17

=== International ===
Appearances by national team and year

National team	Year	Apps	Goals
Germany	2006	10	0
Germany	2007	3	1
Germany	2008	3	0
Total		16	1

Scores and results list Germany's goal tally first, score column indicates score after each Odonkor goal.

List of international goals scored by David Odonkor
No.	Date	Venue	Opponent	Score	Result	Competition
1	12 September 2007	RheinEnergieStadion, Köln, Germany	Romania	2–1	3–1	Friendly

== Honours ==
Borussia Dortmund

- Bundesliga: 2001–02

Germany

- UEFA European Championship runner-up: 2008
- FIFA World Cup third place: 2006
