= Israel Bascón =

Spanish footballer

Israel
Personal information
- Full name: Israel David Bascón Gigato
- Date of birth: 16 March 1987 (age 39)
- Place of birth: Utrera, Spain
- Height: 1.72 m (5 ft 8 in)
- Position: Midfielder

Youth career
- 2002–2004: Betis

Senior career*
Years	Team	Apps	(Gls)
2004–2011	Betis	38	(1)
2006–2007	→ Mérida (loan)	17	(0)
2007–2010	Betis B	87	(8)
2011–2013	Xerez	44	(3)
2013	→ Veria (loan)	0	(0)
2013–2016	Albacete	20	(0)
Total		206	(12)

International career
2003	Spain U16	3	(0)
2005	Spain U17	3	(1)
- * Club domestic league appearances and goals

Israel David Bascón Gigato (born 16 March 1987), known simply as Israel, is a Spanish former professional footballer who played as a right midfielder.

Most of his career, which was bothered by physical problems, was spent at Betis.

== Club career ==
=== Betis ===
Israel was born in Utrera, Province of Seville. A product of Real Betis's youth system, he made his debut for the first team against Real Sociedad, on 4 December 2004 (nine minutes, 1–0 away loss). During that season, he made a further seven La Liga appearances, adding three in the Copa del Rey where he scored his first goal for the Andalusians, against CD Mirandés.

Israel played again just eight league matches in the following campaign, all but one as a substitute. He also appeared in both European competitions, coming from the bench against Liverpool and R.S.C. Anderlecht in the group stage of the UEFA Champions League.

During the 2006 off-season, in August, vastly underplayed due to the presence of Joaquín in his position, Israel spent time at Chelsea on trial after a move to Real Madrid Castilla failed to materialise. Nothing came of it, however, and he then left for Mérida UD on a loan deal.

Shortly after, Israel was involved a serious car accident where he broke a collar bone and suffered several contusions. He returned to Betis afterwards, being registered by their reserves in the Segunda División B.

Israel scored his second competitive goal for Betis on 19 September 2010, heading from a Miguel Lopes cross past Real Valladolid's Jacobo in a 2–1 home win. He contributed 21 games – only four starts, however, in 644 minutes of action – during the season, as the club returned to the top flight after two years out.

=== Xerez ===
In the following seasons, Israel continued to compete in the Segunda División, with Xerez CD. On 11 February 2013, he joined Super League Greece side Veria F.C. on loan until June.

=== Albacete ===
On 13 August 2013, Israel signed a one-year contract with third-tier Albacete Balompié. In November 2016, after undergoing three knee surgeries in only two years, the 29-year-old retired from football.

== Honours ==
Betis

- Copa del Rey: 2004–05
- Segunda División: 2010–11
