= Óscar López (footballer, born 1980) =

Spanish footballer and manager

Personal information
- Full name: Óscar López Hernández
- Date of birth: 11 May 1980 (age 46)
- Place of birth: Cerdanyola, Spain
- Height: 1.78 m (5 ft 10 in)
- Position: Defender

Team information
- Current team: Castellón B (manager)

Youth career
- 1989–1998: Barcelona

Senior career*
Years	Team	Apps	(Gls)
1997–2001	Barcelona C	47	(4)
2000–2004	Barcelona B	93	(5)
2003–2006	Barcelona	8	(0)
2004–2005	→ Lazio (loan)	14	(0)
2005–2006	→ Betis (loan)	18	(0)
2006–2010	Betis	1	(0)
2007–2008	→ Gimnàstic (loan)	15	(0)
2010–2011	Numancia	17	(1)
2011–2012	Go Ahead Eagles	7	(1)
Total		220	(11)

Managerial career
- 2017–2024: Barcelona (youth)
- 2025–: Castellón B
- * Club domestic league appearances and goals

Óscar López Hernández (born 11 May 1980) is a Spanish former professional footballer who played mainly as a left-back. He is currently manager of Castellón B.

His 15-year senior career, which he started with Barcelona, was marred by injuries.

== Playing career ==
Born in Cerdanyola del Vallès, Barcelona, Catalonia, López was a product of the Barcelona cantera. He appeared for the club's C and B sides, being given his senior debut by Radomir Antić in a 3–1 win against Recreativo de Huelva on 25 May 2003 and adding a further seven La Liga games over the course of that and the following seasons. His first taste of European football came on 15 October 2003, in an 8–0 rout of Matador Púchov in the UEFA Cup.

However, López failed to establish himself in the main squad, and was subsequently loaned to Lazio for 2004–05. He made 14 Serie A appearances, played twice in the Coppa Italia and four times in the UEFA Cup, but struggled to earn a regular starting position, and the Romans decided against buying the player at the end of the campaign.

López returned to Spain on 3 August 2005 after being loaned to Real Betis, making his debut in the 2–1 victory over Barcelona in the second leg of the Supercopa de España. He managed to be relatively used during the season, with 27 competitive matches – featuring in two European competitions – and, after that, signed a permanent four-year contract.

In January 2007, López was loaned to top-flight strugglers Gimnàstic de Tarragona for five months, where he sustained a serious knee injury that sidelined him for several months, although the move was extended for 2007–08. Upon his return to Andalusia in July 2008, he was told to look for a new team; unable to do so, he spent the following year training with the club, although not registered at all.

On 4 February 2010, being completely ostracised at Betis, López was finally allowed to leave and joined Numancia of Segunda División. He scored his only goal as a professional in his country on 16 May in a 1–1 home draw against Rayo Vallecano, as the Sorians eventually failed to return to the top tier; in June 2011, aged 31, he was released.

López moved to Go Ahead Eagles in the Dutch Eerste Divisie on 23 December 2011, on a deal until June 2012 with an option for an additional year.

== Coaching career ==
After retiring, López returned to the Camp Nou as a youth manager. He left his post in June 2024, having won two leagues and the 2021–22 edition of the Copa de Campeones Juvenil de Fútbol with the under-19s; several players of that side went on to represent the first team.

On 26 December 2025, López was named head coach of Segunda Federación side Castellón B, replacing Carles Salvador who moved into the club's structure.
