= Melli (Spanish footballer) =

Spanish footballer (born 1984)

Personal information
- Full name: Juan Alberto Andreu Alvarado
- Date of birth: 6 June 1984 (age 42)
- Place of birth: Barbate, Spain
- Height: 1.81 m (5 ft 11 1/2 in)
- Position: Defender

Youth career
- 1988–2001: Betis

Senior career*
Years	Team	Apps	(Gls)
2001–2004	Betis B	58	(1)
2002	→ Poli Ejido (loan)	2	(0)
2002–2010	Betis	177	(4)
2010–2011	Tenerife	25	(1)
2011–2013	Gent	59	(3)
2013–2014	Sheriff	23	(3)
2014–2015	Ergotelis	10	(1)
2015	Simurq	14	(0)
2015–2016	Neftçi	26	(0)
2016–2017	Reus	12	(0)
2017–2019	Mirandés	44	(4)
Total		450	(17)

International career
2000–2001	Spain U16	6	(1)
2001	Spain U17	4	(1)
2002–2003	Spain U19	8	(0)
2003	Spain U20	9	(0)
2003–2006	Spain U21	20	(1)
Medal record
Men's Football
Representing Spain
UEFA European Under-16 Championship
Winner	2001 England
- * Club domestic league appearances and goals

Juan Alberto Andreu Alvarado, known as Melli (Spanish pronunciation: [ˈmeʎi]); born 6 June 1984), is a Spanish former footballer. A versatile defender, he could play as either a right-back or a centre-back.

He spent most of his professional career at Betis, for which he appeared in 215 competitive matches and won the 2005 Copa del Rey.

== Club career ==
=== Betis ===
Born in Barbate, Province of Cádiz, Melli joined Real Betis as a 14-year-old, and made his way up through the ranks until he reached the reserves in 2001. He spent a short period on loan at Andalusia neighbours Polideportivo Ejido in the late stages of the 2001–02 season, in the Segunda División.

Melli scored his first professional goal through a header from a Joaquín corner kick, against CA Osasuna on 18 September 2004 (3–2 away loss). He also appeared in the UEFA Champions League and UEFA Cup during the 2005–06 campaign: in the latter tournament, he scored an essential goal at AZ Alkmaar, which allowed his team to progress to the next round; this came just one week after he put two past his own net against FC Barcelona in a La Liga match at the Camp Nou.

Melli won his first medal for Betis in the 2005 final of the Copa del Rey against Osasuna at the Vicente Calderón Stadium, on 11 June 2005, playing the full 90 minutes plus extra time in an eventual 2–1 win. He continued to be a defensive presence in the following seasons for the Verdiblancos, playing an average of 25 league games and suffering relegation in 2008–09.

=== Later career ===
In late August 2011, after another relegation, now with CD Tenerife (in the second division) whom he joined in summer 2010 – a second consecutive for the Canary Islands club – Melli moved abroad for the first time and signed a two-year contract for K.A.A. Gent from Belgium, joining compatriot César Arzo. After leaving in 2013, he represented in quick succession FC Sheriff Tiraspol, Ergotelis FC, Simurq PIK and Neftçi PFK, the latter two sides competing in the Azerbaijan Premier League.

Following his release from Neftçi on 20 June 2016, the 32-year-old Meli returned to Spain and signed a one-year contract with CF Reus Deportiu.

== International career ==
Melli represented Spain at under-16, under-17, under-19, under-20 and under-21 levels. He made his debut for the latter on 29 April 2003 when he was 18, playing 18 minutes in a 1–0 win over Australia in Lorca, and scored his only goal in another friendly, a 3–1 defeat of Scotland on 2 September 2004.

In the run up to the 2006 FIFA World Cup, senior team manager Luis Aragonés called up Melli to a get-together, however he was ultimately not part of the squad at the finals and never earned a full cap.

== Personal life ==
Melli's nickname stemmed from the Spanish word mellizo (twin), as he himself was a twin. His brother Víctor was also a footballer, also being nicknamed Melli. A goalkeeper, he never played in higher than Segunda División B during his career.

== Club statistics ==
As of 25 August 2015

Club	Season	League			Cup		Other		Total	
Club	Season	Division	Apps	Goals	Apps	Goals	Apps	Goals	Apps	Goals
Betis	2002–03	La Liga	8	0	1	0	1 (Note: Appearances in UEFA Cup)	0	10	0
Betis	2003–04	La Liga	4	0	0	0	—		4	0
Betis	2004–05	La Liga	29	1	7	0	—		36	1
Betis	2005–06	La Liga	31	0	5 (Note: Includes appearances in Supercopa de España)	0	11 (Note: Appearances in UEFA Champions League and UEFA Europa League)	1	47	1
Betis	2006–07	La Liga	27	0	6	0	—		33	0
Betis	2007–08	La Liga	26	0	2	0	—		28	0
Betis	2008–09	La Liga	26	1	4	0	—		30	1
Betis	2009–10	Segunda División	26	2	1	0	—		27	2
Betis	Total		177	4	26	0	12	1	215	5
Tenerife	2010–11	Segunda División	25	1	0	0	—		25	1
Gent	2011–12	Belgian Pro League	37	3	4	1	—		41	4
Gent	2012–13	Belgian Pro League	22	0	3	2	4 (Note: Appearances in UEFA Europa League)	1	29	3
Gent	Total		59	3	7	3	4	1	70	7
Sheriff	2013–14	Divizia Naţională	23	3	3	0	3	0	29	3
Ergotelis	2014–15	Super League Greece	10	1	0	0	—		10	1
Simurq	2014–15	Azerbaijan Premier League	14	0	4	0	—		18	0
Neftçi	2015–16	Azerbaijan Premier League	26	0	3	0	2	0	31	0
Career total			334	12	43	3	21	2	3989	17

== Honours ==
Betis

- Copa del Rey: 2004–05

Sheriff

- Moldovan National Division: 2013–14

Spain U16

- UEFA European Under-16 Championship: 2001

Spain U19

- UEFA European Under-19 Championship: 2002

Spain U20

- FIFA U-20 World Cup runner-up: 2003
