= Dani (footballer, born 1981) =

Spanish footballer

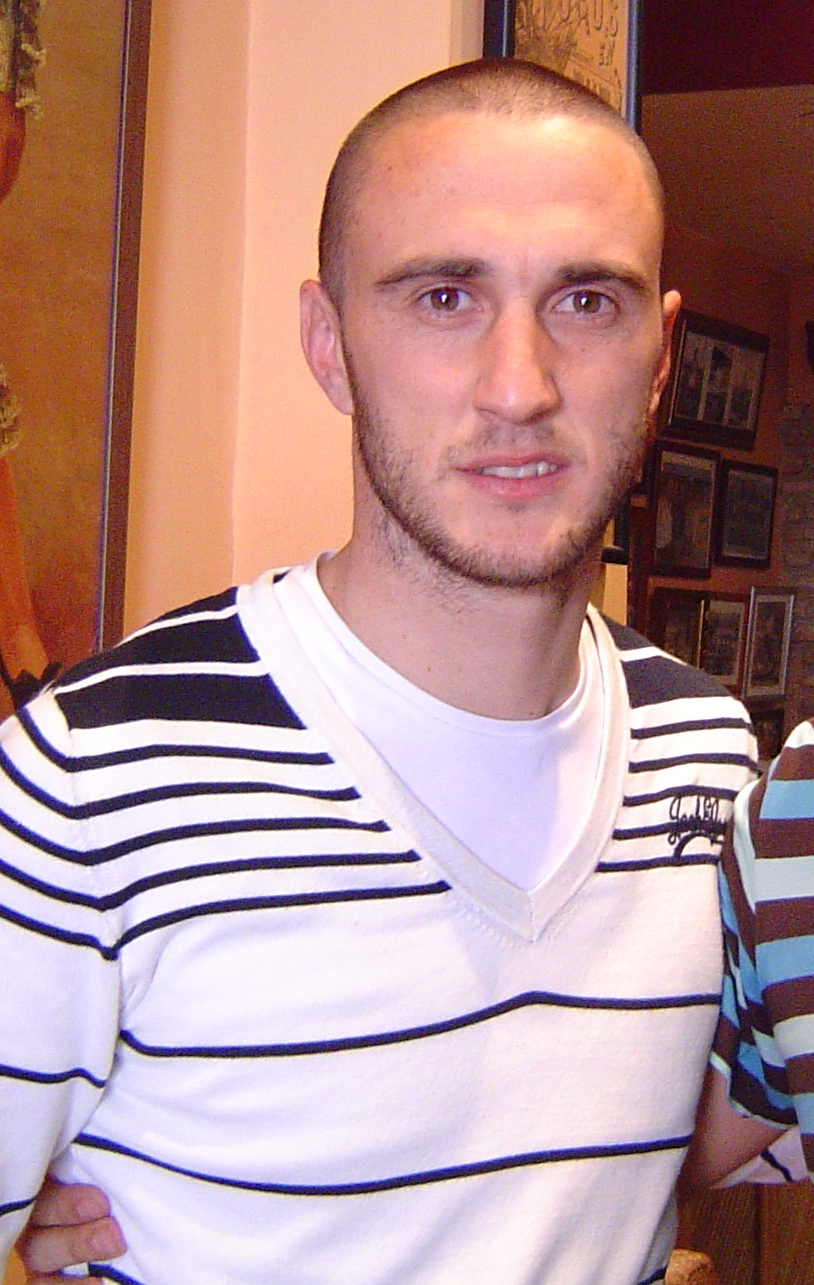
- Dani in 2009

Personal information
- Full name: Daniel Martín Alexandre
- Date of birth: 16 September 1981 (age 45)
- Place of birth: Seville, Spain
- Height: 1.78 m (5 ft 10 in)
- Position: Striker

Youth career
- 1998–1999: Betis

Senior career*
| Years | Team | Apps | (Gls) |
| 1999–2002 | Betis B | 79 | (23) |
| 2001–2010 | Betis | 94 | (19) |
| 2007–2008 | → Cádiz (loan) | 35 | (10) |
| 2008–2009 | → Elche (loan) | 14 | (0) |
| 2010–2011 | Recreativo | 39 | (4) |
| 2011–2012 | Atlético Baleares | 29 | (4) |
| 2012–2013 | Pierikos | 25 | (8) |
| Total | | 315 | (68) |

International career
| 1999 | Spain U18 | 3 | (3) |
| 2001 | Spain U20 | 1 | (0) |
| 2002 | Spain U21 | 1 | (0) |
- * Club domestic league appearances and goals

Daniel Martín Alexandre (born 16 September 1981), known as Dani, is a Spanish former professional footballer who played as a striker.

His career was closely associated to Betis, for which he appeared in 115 competitive games (26 goals) and scored the winning goal in the 2005 Copa del Rey final.

== Club career ==
Born in Seville, Dani started playing professionally with his hometown club Real Betis, and started out with their reserves, a spell that included six goals in 27 games in 1999–2000 in the Segunda División B. On 4 November 2001, he made his first-team – and La Liga – debut, playing the second half of a 0–1 home loss against Real Zaragoza and finishing the season with 17 appearances and five goals.

After having missed most of the 2002–03 campaign due to a serious knee injury, occurred in April 2002 and relapsed in August, Dani was knocked unconscious during a league game against Deportivo de La Coruña in November 2003, and was unable to remember a disallowed goal he had scored earlier. However, he continued to grab important goals for the Andalusia side with relatively little playing time, most notably the extra time winner in the 2005 final of the Copa del Rey against CA Osasuna, adding the only goal in the 1–0 home victory over Chelsea in the group stage of UEFA Champions League. On 20 August 2005, his brace at the Camp Nou helped to defeat FC Barcelona 2–1 in the Supercopa de España, but the Catalans had already won the first leg 3–0.

Dani scored against Real Madrid on 18 January 2007, eliminating the eventual league champions from domestic cup contention; his equalising goal gave Betis a 1–1 draw, putting them through to the quarter-finals on the away goals rule. However, he finished the league with only 14 appearances, not being able to find the net.

Under contract until 2010, Dani joined Segunda División club Cádiz CF, also in the region, on a one-year deal including the possibility of definitive purchase at the end of the term. In spite of his ten goals, the team could not avoid relegation.

Dani stayed in that tier for the following season, being again loaned, this time to Alicante-based Elche CF. His stint was marred by injuries and dramatic loss of form, as he only managed to score once in official games.

Returning to Betis in July, Dani immediately underwent a knee operation, only being made available in January 2010. However, he was one of the club's last attacking options and, later that month, signed a one-and-a-half-year deal with second-division Recreativo de Huelva.

On 6 February 2011, Dani scored the game's only goal as Recreativo defeated Betis at the Estadio Benito Villamarín. He retired in 2013 at the age of 32, after spells in his country's third division and Greece.

== International career ==
Dani earned his only cap for Spain at under-21 level on 26 March 2002, featuring 60 minutes of a 3–0 friendly win in the Netherlands.

== Honours ==
Betis

- Copa del Rey: 2004–05
