= Juanito (footballer, born 1976) =

Spanish footballer and manager

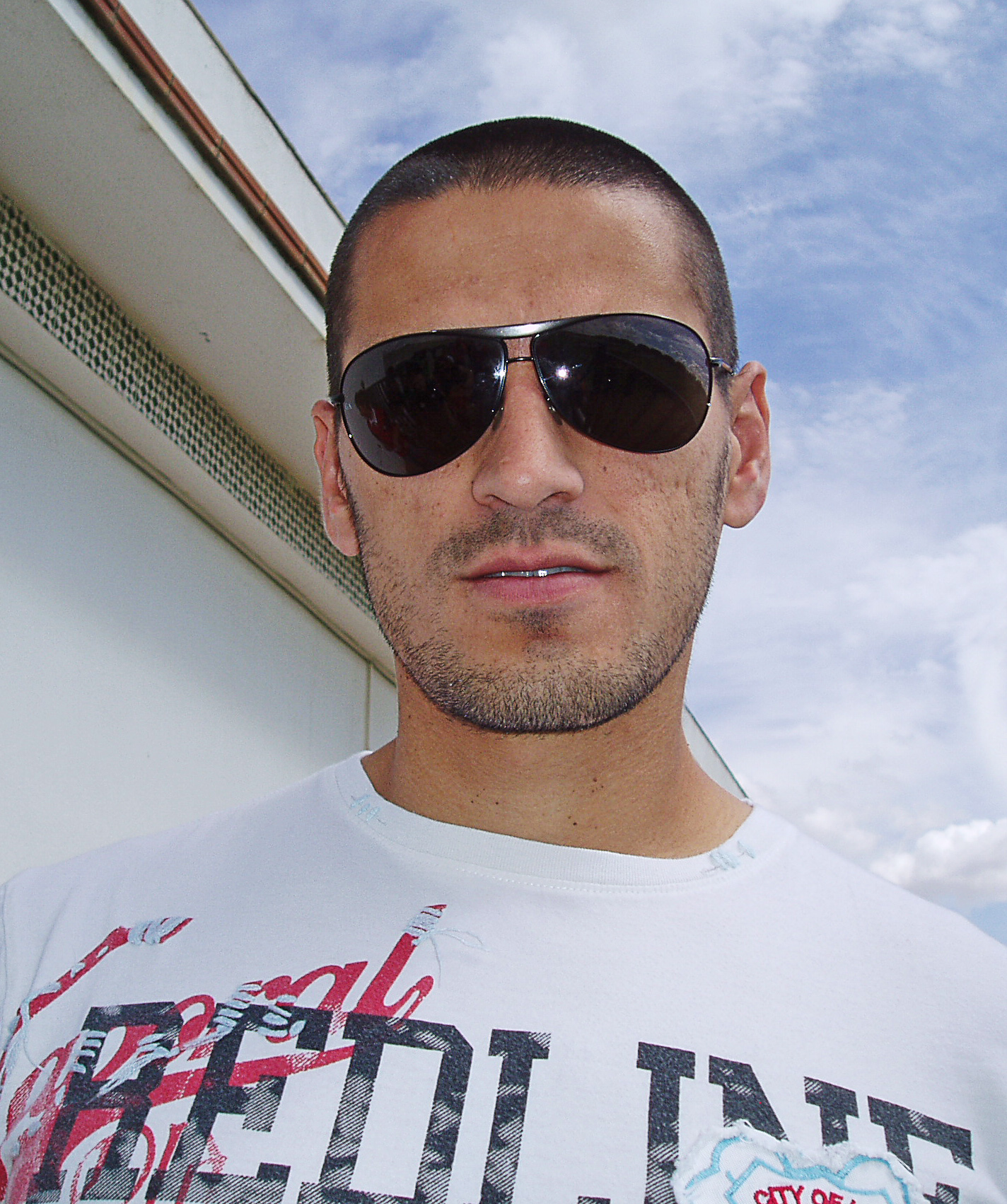
- Juanito with Betis in 2008

Personal information
- Full name: Juan Gutiérrez Moreno
- Date of birth: 23 July 1976 (age 50)
- Place of birth: Cádiz, Spain
- Height: 1.83 m (6 ft 0 in)
- Position: Centre-back

Youth career
- Cádiz

Senior career*
Years	Team	Apps	(Gls)
1995–1997	Cádiz B	8	(0)
1995	Cádiz	1	(0)
1997–2000	Betis B	98	(7)
2000–2009	Betis	255	(19)
2000–2001	→ Recreativo (loan)	37	(0)
2009–2011	Atlético Madrid	17	(2)
2011–2012	Valladolid	24	(0)
Total		440	(28)

International career
2002–2008	Spain	26	(3)

Managerial career
- 2012–2015: Betis B (assistant)
- 2015–2016: San Roque
- 2016: Sanluqueño
- 2019: Roeselare
Medal record
Representing Spain
UEFA European Championship
Winner	2008 Austria-Switzerland
- * Club domestic league appearances and goals

Juan Gutiérrez Moreno (born 23 July 1976), commonly known as Juanito, is a Spanish professional football manager and former player who played as a central defender.

He spent the bulk of his career with Betis, appearing in 294 official matches and winning the 2005 Copa del Rey. In La Liga, he also represented Atlético Madrid.

Juanito was part of the Spain national team squads at the 2006 World Cup and two European Championships, contributing to victory in Euro 2008.

== Club career ==
=== Cádiz and Betis ===
Juanito was born in Cádiz. After taking his first steps as a senior with the reserves of hometown club Cádiz CF, he transferred to Andalusia neighbours Real Betis in 1997, spending three seasons with the reserves; in 2000–01 he was loaned to another team in the region, Recreativo de Huelva of Segunda División.

Juanito made his debut for Betis' main squad in the 2001–02 campaign, and immediately established himself as a regular starter, often scoring from deadball situations. His first came on 27 January 2002, a last-minute goal against Real Madrid in a 1–1 away draw.

In 2004–05, Juanito netted four goals in 33 games as the side qualified for the UEFA Champions League, also winning the Copa del Rey. David Rivas, the other stopper, added another four.

In the following three seasons, as Betis constantly battled La Liga relegation successfully, Juanito only missed a total of 13 league matches, adding six goals. On 22 April 2007, in a 2–2 draw at RCD Espanyol, he played the last minutes as a goalkeeper due to the dismissal of Pedro Contreras, with a penalty being awarded – Raúl Tamudo equalised.

=== Atlético and Valladolid ===
After being relegated at the end of 2008–09, Juanito moved to Atlético Madrid on a free transfer, aged almost 33. His debut season was shaky, as he started as first-choice, was relegated to the bench, regained his position from Colombian Luis Perea and lost it again; on 4 April 2010 he scored his first goal as a Colchonero, opening the 3–0 home victory over Deportivo de La Coruña.

For the 2010–11 campaign, all Atlético stoppers remained with the team and Uruguayan Diego Godín was also acquired. Hence, Juanito fell further down in the defensive pecking order, only appearing in a Spanish Cup match against Universidad de Las Palmas CF (1–1 home draw, after a 5–0 away win in the first leg); on 11 January 2011, he terminated his contract with the club, moving to second-tier Real Valladolid shortly after.

== International career ==
Juanito made his debut for Spain on 21 August 2002 against Hungary, in a testimonial for Ferenc Puskás. His first goal for the national side came on 1 March 2006, in a 3–2 friendly win against the Ivory Coast.

Juanito represented Spain at UEFA Euro 2004 and 2008 (playing in the 2–1 victory over Greece in the latter tournament) and the 2006 FIFA World Cup, scoring with his head in the 1–0 defeat of Saudi Arabia. That goal was the first ever scored by a Betis player in the competition.

In the 2010 World Cup qualifier against Estonia on 11 October 2008, Juanito netted through another header in a 3–0 away win. He was overlooked for the finals in South Africa, however, as the national team emerged victorious.

=== International goals ===
Scores and results list Spain's goal tally first, score column indicates score after each Juanito goal.

List of international goals scored by Juanito
No.	Date	Venue	Opponent	Score	Result	Competition
1	1 March 2006	José Zorrilla, Valladolid, Spain	Ivory Coast	3–2	3–2	Friendly
2	23 June 2006	Fritz Walter, Kaiserslautern, Germany	Saudi Arabia	1–0	1–0	2006 World Cup
3	11 October 2008	A. Le Coq Arena, Tallinn, Estonia	Estonia	1–0	3–0	2010 World Cup qualification

== Coaching career ==
In August 2012, Juanito returned to Betis as assistant coach of their youth team, and two months later he was promoted to the same role at the reserve side. He was given his first job managing in his own right in June 2015, taking the reins at CD San Roque de Lepe for the upcoming Segunda División B campaign; he was sacked in March 2016, as they occupied a relegation place.

Juanito was given a new job in the same division on 9 July 2016, at Atlético Sanluqueño CF in his native province. He was relieved of his duties on 10 November with the team in last place, having not won since the opening day.

After a spell coaching in Betis' youth ranks, Juanito left in January 2019 for the first foreign job of his entire career, at K.S.V. Roeselare of the Belgian First Division B. He was their third Spanish manager of the season, after Jordi Condom and Nano.

== Honours ==
Betis

- Copa del Rey: 2004–05

Atlético Madrid

- UEFA Europa League: 2009–10
- Copa del Rey runner-up: 2009–10

Spain

- UEFA European Championship: 2008
