= Joaquín (footballer, born 1981) =

Spanish footballer

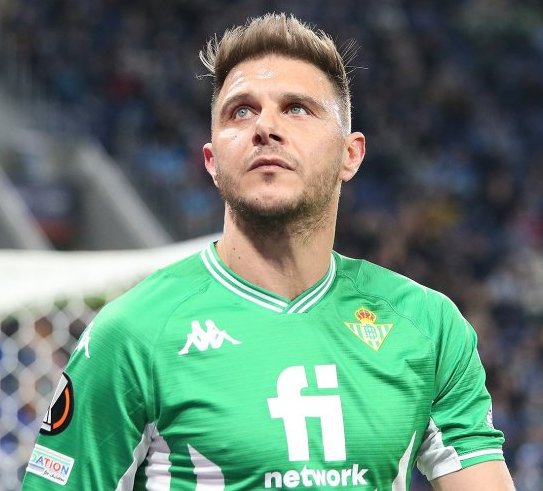
- Joaquín with Betis in 2022

Personal information
- Full name: Joaquín Sánchez Rodríguez
- Date of birth: 21 July 1981 (age 45)
- Place of birth: El Puerto de Santa María, Spain
- Height: 1.79 m (5 ft 10 in)
- Position: Winger

Youth career
- Los Frailes
- San Luis
- 1997–1999: Betis

Senior career*
Years	Team	Apps	(Gls)
1999–2000	Betis B	27	(2)
2000–2006	Betis	218	(32)
2006–2011	Valencia	158	(18)
2011–2013	Málaga	57	(6)
2013–2015	Fiorentina	49	(4)
2015–2023	Betis	227	(24)
Total		736	(86)

International career
1999–2000	Spain U18	4	(0)
2001	Spain U21	7	(0)
2002–2007	Spain	51	(4)
- * Club domestic league appearances and goals

Joaquín Sánchez Rodríguez (Spanish pronunciation: [xoaˈkin ˈsantʃeθ roˈðɾiɣeθ]; born 21 July 1981), known mononymously as Joaquín, is a Spanish former professional footballer who played as a right winger.

He was best known for his pace and acceleration, as well as excellent dribbling and crossing ability. During his career, he was mainly associated with Betis and Valencia, appearing in a joint-record 622 La Liga matches over 20 seasons and scoring 77 goals while winning the Copa del Rey with both clubs (twice with the former). He also represented Málaga in the competition, signing with Fiorentina from Italy in 2013.

Joaquín was capped for Spain on 51 occasions, representing the nation in two World Cups and Euro 2004.

== Club career ==
=== Betis ===
Joaquín was born in El Puerto de Santa María, Province of Cádiz. In 1999–2000 he started his senior career, appearing regularly for Real Betis B (after spending two years in the youth ranks) as it was eventually relegated from the Segunda División B. He moved to the first team the following season, making his professional debut on 3 September 2000 and having an immediate impact – 38 matches and three goals – as the Andalusians returned to La Liga after one year out.

Subsequently, Joaquín collected well over 200 official appearances for Betis in the next five years, assisting and scoring alike. During 2004–05 he played all the games, scoring five times, and added three goals in the campaign's Copa del Rey; as the final of the latter was played at the Vicente Calderón Stadium on 11 June 2005, he featured the full 90 minutes plus extra time of the 2–1 win against CA Osasuna.

Joaquín appeared in all six group-stage matches in the following season's UEFA Champions League, including the 1–0 victory over Chelsea on 1 November 2005 and a 0–0 draw against Liverpool at Anfield late in the same month (third-place finish, UEFA Cup relegation). On the domestic front, he scored three goals from 35 appearances for the 14th-placed side.

In late July 2006, following a conversation with Joaquín, Betis chairman Pepe León stated that the player had convinced him that he would stay at the club for another year. "It has surprised me a lot,” he admitted. “I came to convince him and on the contrary, he has convinced me", he further added. In mid-August, the player caused shock at the club by declaring in a press conference his intentions to leave.

=== Valencia ===
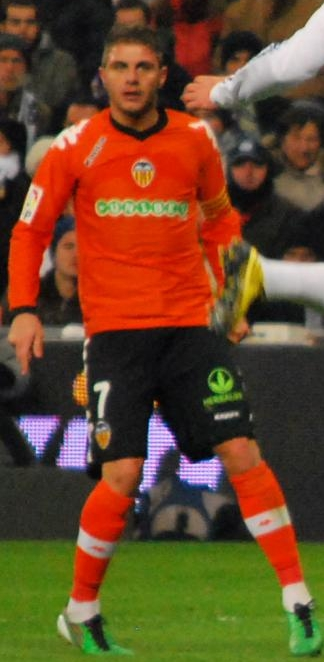
Joaquín playing for Valencia in 2010

Joaquín was meant to join Valencia CF in early August 2006 for €18 million, in a swap deal that also included Mario Regueiro. However, some difficulties in the payment appeared, along with the Uruguayan's insistence in remaining at Valencia, with the transfer thus being delayed.

Joaquín was loaned to Albacete Balompié as punishment by Betis owner Manuel Ruiz de Lopera, due to the player taking a certain percentage of the transfer fee. Lopera used a clause in his contract whereby he could be loaned to any club if it was decided by Betis (Joaquín travelled to his new club's facilities using his own transport and, to prove that he did so, had himself photographed by operatives working nearby. The switch was subsequently cancelled).

In late August 2006, Joaquín officially moved to Valencia for €25 million, making him the club's most expensive signing to that date as the player penned a five-year contract, with the choice of a further one-year extension. In his first year, he played 35 matches and scored five goals as the Che made it to the Champions League's qualifying rounds.

Joaquín began facing stiff competition for a starting berth in 2009–10, being challenged by younger Pablo Hernández. During the course of the campaign – they also played in the UEFA Europa League – both players received roughly the same number of minutes and scored a similar total of goals.

With the departure of David Villa to FC Barcelona, Joaquín was given the No. 7 shirt for 2010–11. He led the scoring charts after the first round, netting twice in a 3–1 win at Málaga CF. On 12 February 2011 he scored another brace, helping Valencia come from behind at Atlético Madrid to win 2–1, eventually finishing third and qualifying for the Champions League.

=== Málaga ===
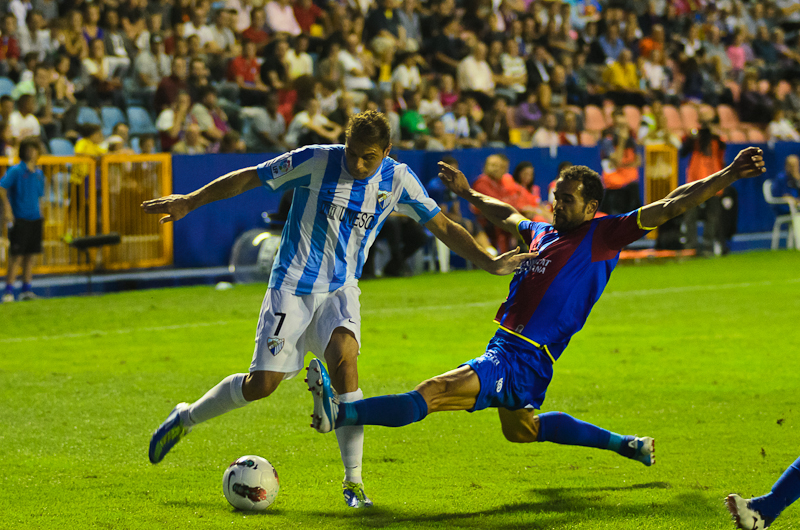
Joaquín in action against Levante in 2011

On 24 June 2011, Joaquín signed with Málaga for three years, for a fee of €4 million. He made his debut for the club on 28 August in a 2–1 away loss against Sevilla FC, and opened his scoring account by netting twice in another local derby, a 4–0 home defeat of Granada CF.

In two home games in October 2012 separated by only four days, Joaquín scored to give his team the final win, on both occasions after having missed a penalty: he started against Real Valladolid (2–1), then netted the match's only against AC Milan in the Champions League group stage.

=== Fiorentina ===
On 13 June 2013, aged nearly 32, Joaquín moved abroad for the first time, agreeing a three-year deal with Italy's ACF Fiorentina. He made his competitive debut for his new team on 29 August, starting in a 1–0 home loss against Grasshopper Club Zürich in the Europa League playoff round.

Joaquín's first goal for the Viola came as a substitute on 20 October 2013, in a 4–2 home win over Serie A champions Juventus FC, and his second of the league season was the only one in a victory at SSC Napoli the following 23 March. He also played a part in the team's run to the final of the Coppa Italia, netting in a 2–0 home win over AC ChievoVerona in the last 16.

=== Return to Betis ===
On 31 August 2015, Joaquín returned to Betis by signing a three-year contract. In 2017, he acquired a 2% share in his first club.

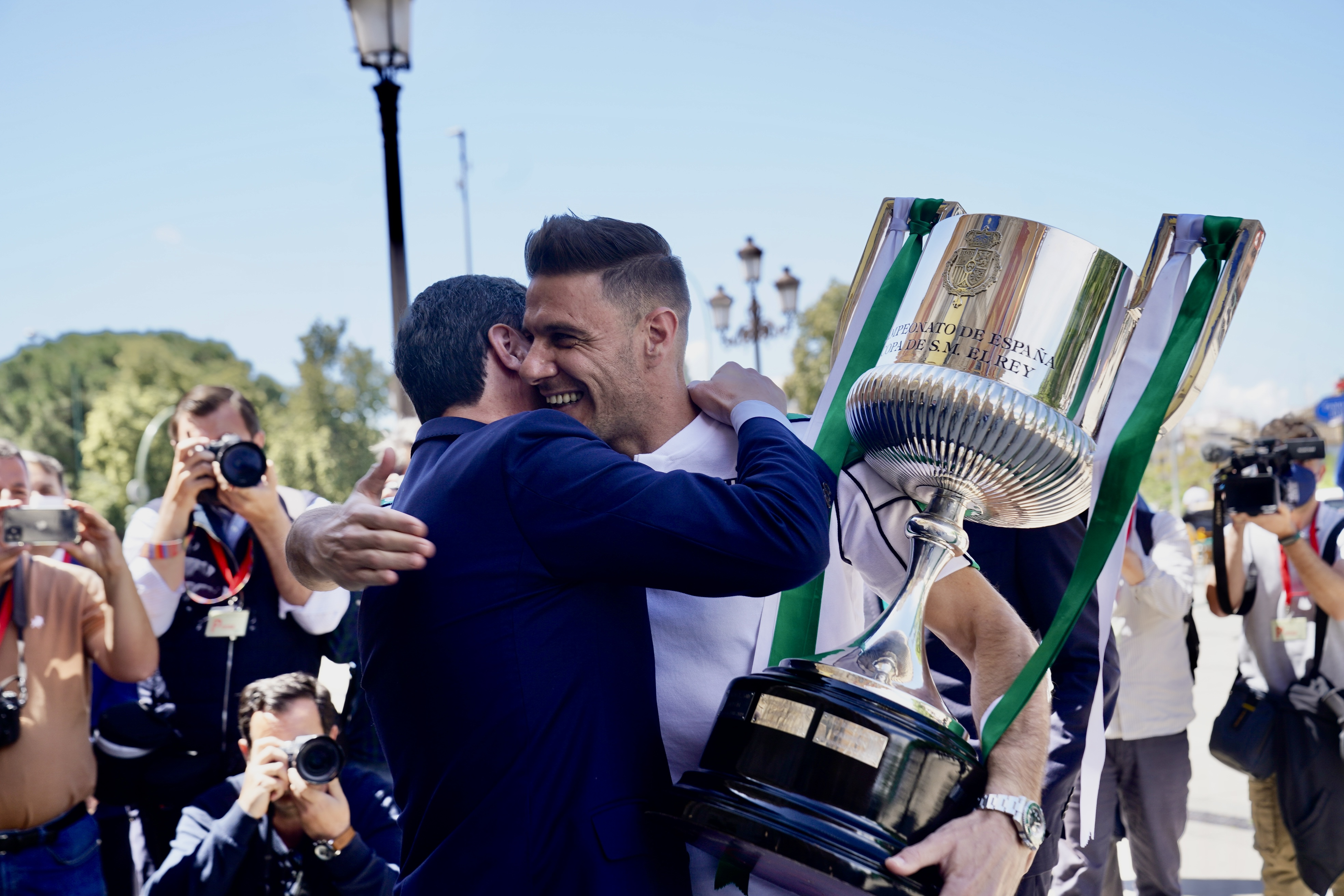
Joaquín holding the 2022 Copa del Rey trophy

Joaquín found the net in a 1–1 draw against Getafe CF on 15 September 2019, marking his 400th appearance for the green-and-whites – he also drew level with Julio Cardeñosa as the player with most Spanish top-tier appearances for Betis with 307. On 8 December, he scored an 18-minute hat-trick (the first of his long career) in a 3–2 home win over Athletic Bilbao, becoming the oldest player ever to achieve the feat in La Liga at the age of 38 years and 140 days, breaking the previous record of 37 years set by Alfredo Di Stéfano in 1964. At the end of the year, he agreed to an extension until 2021.

On 16 July 2020, in a 2–1 home loss to Deportivo Alavés, Joaquín made his 551st Spanish top-division appearance, thereby surpassing Raúl as the outfield player with the most games in the competition; only goalkeeper Andoni Zubizarreta remained ahead of him, on 622. On 15 September 2022, after scoring in the 3–2 defeat of PFC Ludogorets Razgrad in the group stage, he became the oldest player to achieve the feat in the history of the Europa League at 41 years and 56 days.

On 19 April 2023, Joaquín announced that he would retire at the end of the season. He eventually equalled Zubizarreta's record, and helped Betis to qualify for the Europa League after a sixth-place finish.

== International career ==
Joaquín made his debut for the Spain national team on 13 February 2002 against Portugal, in a 1–1 friendly played in Barcelona. Brilliant club form for Betis saw him get called up for that year's FIFA World Cup, where he appeared twice: in his second match, the quarter-finals against co-hosts South Korea, he was involved in a couple of debatable decisions, including one incident where the linesman raised his flag for a goal kick as Joaquín was crossing a ball to Fernando Morientes, who was denied a golden goal – the argument was that the ball had crossed the line. However, replays showed that it did not; the game then went to penalties, and he was chosen to take his team's fourth attempt – despite carrying an injury – which was blocked by Lee Woon-jae.

Joaquín played again for the nation through their premature exit at UEFA Euro 2004, also being selected for the 2006 World Cup. He totalled five appearances, but was not first-choice at either competition, only starting twice overall.

During the early stages of the Euro 2008 qualification campaign, Spain lost 3–2 against Northern Ireland. After the match, Joaquín said in a Spanish radio interview: "Right now, the national team is a mess, chaos and Luis doesn't know how to handle it in these difficult moments. I know that what I'm saying is not going to help me get back into the national team, but it's what I feel." He later commented, "The only thing I wanted to say is that these are not clear times for the national squad after losing to Northern Ireland .... but it was not my intention to attack the team or Luis Aragonés". Subsequently, he failed to be selected again as the national side went on to record 35 consecutive games without defeat, winning a record 15 consecutive times and lifting the Euro 2008, 2010 World Cup and Euro 2012 trophies.

== Personal life ==
Joaquín grew up in a big family, with eight brothers and sisters in total. As the third child, he had two elder brothers. Three of the eight children in this family are or have been engaged in football: besides Joaquín, his elder brother Lucas played for Cádiz CF, and his brother Ricardo also played in Betis' youth ranks.

Growing up, Joaquín wanted to be a bullfighter. Joaquín's uncle, nicknamed "El Chino", firmly believed in Joaquín's talent and paid for his daily round trip between Cádiz and Seville when Joaquín was in Betis' youth system. El Chino died in 2002, and since then Joaquín has dedicated most of his achievements to him, remembering him as his mentor.

After the 2005 domestic cup conquest, Joaquín married Susana Saborido on 8 July. The trophy was present at the ceremony, as was the entire Betis squad.

In October 2022, after a long and successful presence on television and social media, he made his debut as a TV host in prime time, with El novato, an interview program with popular personalities with a wide audience since its inception. One year later, he appeared in the Kings League cup finals held at the La Rosaleda Stadium, home of his former club Málaga; he chose to represent Los Troncos FC, playing in the semi-final and contributing an assist on the opening goal as his team went on to beat Aniquiladores FC 2–0 and advance to the decisive match against Ultimate Móstoles later that day.

== Career statistics ==
=== Club ===
Appearances and goals by club, season and competition
Club	Season	League			National cup (Note: Includes Copa del Rey, Coppa Italia)		Europe		Other		Total	
Club	Season	Division	Apps	Goals	Apps	Goals	Apps	Goals	Apps	Goals	Apps	Goals
Betis B	1999–2000	Segunda División B	27	2	0	0	—		—		27	2
Betis	2000–01	Segunda División	38	3	1	0	—		—		39	3
Betis	2001–02	La Liga	34	4	1	0	—		—		35	4
Betis	2002–03	La Liga	37	9	3	2	5 (Note: Appearances in UEFA Cup)	1	—		45	12
Betis	2003–04	La Liga	36	8	3	1	—		—		39	9
Betis	2004–05	La Liga	38	5	9	0	—		—		47	5
Betis	2005–06	La Liga	35	3	3	0	12 (Note: Eight appearances in UEFA Champions League, four appearances in UEFA Cup)	0	1 (Note: Appearance(s) in Supercopa de España)	0	51	3
Betis	Total		218	32	20	3	17	1	1	0	256	36
Valencia	2006–07	La Liga	35	5	3	0	8 (Note: Appearances in UEFA Champions League)	0	—		46	5
Valencia	2007–08	La Liga	34	3	8	4	7	0	—		49	7
Valencia	2008–09	La Liga	31	4	3	1	4	1	2	0	40	6
Valencia	2009–10	La Liga	28	2	4	1	13 (Note: Appearances in UEFA Europa League)	4	—		45	7
Valencia	2010–11	La Liga	30	4	3	0	5	1	—		38	5
Valencia	Total		158	18	21	6	37	6	2	0	218	30
Málaga	2011–12	La Liga	23	2	2	0	—		—		25	2
Málaga	2012–13	La Liga	34	4	1	1	10	3	—		45	8
Málaga	Total		57	6	3	1	10	3	0	0	70	10
Fiorentina	2013–14	Serie A	26	2	5	1	5	2	—		36	5
Fiorentina	2014–15	Serie A	23	2	3	0	8	0	—		34	2
Fiorentina	Total		49	4	8	1	14	2	—		70	7
Betis	2015–16	La Liga	30	1	2	0	—		—		32	1
Betis	2016–17	La Liga	28	3	1	0	—		—		29	3
Betis	2017–18	La Liga	35	4	1	0	—		—		36	4
Betis	2018–19	La Liga	30	6	7	1	6	0	—		43	7
Betis	2019–20	La Liga	34	8	2	2	—		—		36	10
Betis	2020–21	La Liga	27	2	3	0	—		—		30	2
Betis	2021–22	La Liga	21	0	5	2	10	0	—		37	2
Betis	2022–23	La Liga	22	0	1	0	7	1	0	0	30	1
Betis	Total		227	24	22	5	23	1	0	0	272	30
Betis	Betis total		445	56	42	8	40	2	1	0	528	66
Career total			736	86	74	16	101	13	3	0	913	115

=== International ===
Appearances and goals by national team and year
National team	Year	Apps	Goals
Spain	2002	9	0
Spain	2003	8	2
Spain	2004	9	0
Spain	2005	9	2
Spain	2006	7	0
Spain	2007	9	0
Total		51	4

Scores and results list Spain's goal tally first, score column indicates score after each Joaquín goal.

List of international goals scored by Joaquín
No.	Date	Venue	Opponent	Score	Result	Competition
1	2 April 2003	Antonio Amilivia, León, Spain	Armenia	3–0	3–0	UEFA Euro 2004 qualifying
2	6 September 2003	D. Afonso Henriques, Guimarães, Portugal	Portugal	2–0	3–0	Friendly
3	9 February 2005	Juegos Mediterráneos, Almería, Spain	San Marino	1–0	5–0	2006 FIFA World Cup qualification
4	26 March 2005	El Helmántico, Villares de la Reina, Spain	China	3–0	3–0	Friendly

== Honours ==
Betis

- Copa del Rey: 2004–05, 2021–22

Valencia

- Copa del Rey: 2007–08

Fiorentina

- Coppa Italia runner-up: 2013–14

Individual

- La Liga Breakthrough Player of the Year: 2002
- FIFA World Cup All-Star Team: 2002 (reserve)

== See also ==
- List of La Liga players (400+ appearances)
- List of Real Betis players (100+ appearances)
- List of Valencia CF players (100+ appearances)
