= Toni Doblas =

Spanish footballer

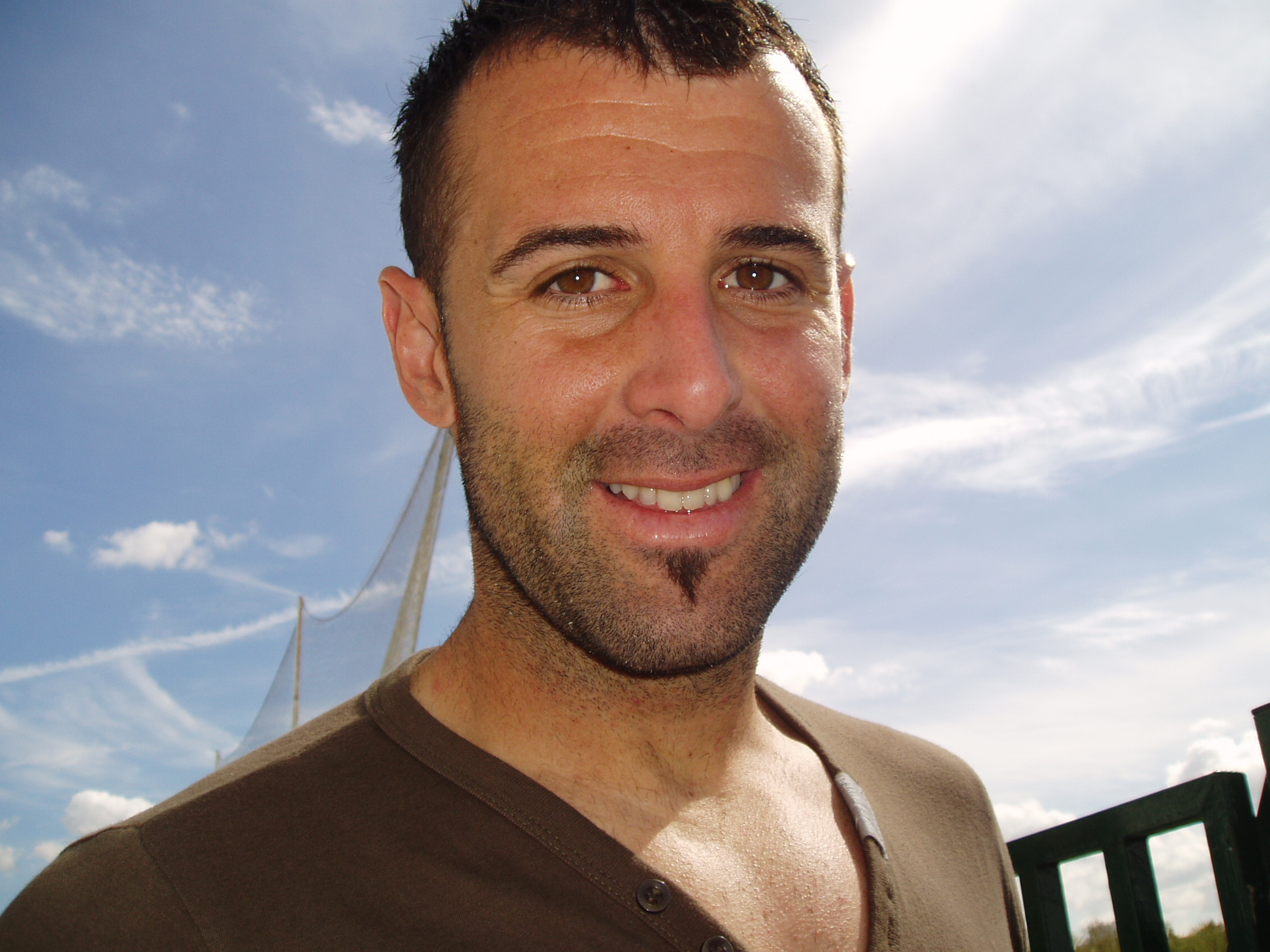
- Doblas as a Betis player in 2008

Personal information
- Full name: Antonio Doblas Santana
- Date of birth: 5 August 1980 (age 46)
- Place of birth: Bellavista, Spain
- Height: 1.84 m (6 ft 0 in)
- Position: Goalkeeper

Youth career
- Bellavista
- 1997–1999: Betis

Senior career*
Years	Team	Apps	(Gls)
1999–2003	Betis B	98	(0)
2003–2008	Betis	76	(0)
2003–2004	→ Xerez (loan)	4	(0)
2008–2009	Zaragoza	14	(0)
2009–2010	Huesca	29	(0)
2010–2013	Zaragoza	18	(0)
2011–2012	→ Xerez (loan)	36	(0)
2013	Khazar Lankaran	7	(0)
2014	Napoli	2	(0)
2014	HJK	14	(0)
2015	Cornellà	9	(0)
2015	Delhi Dynamos	12	(0)
2016	Toledo	8	(0)
2016	Delhi Dynamos	12	(0)
2017	Extremadura	18	(0)
2017	San Fernando	18	(0)
2018	Ceres–Negros	22	(0)
- * Club domestic league appearances and goals as of 12 May 2019

Antonio "Toni" Doblas Santana (born 5 August 1980) is a Spanish former footballer who played as a goalkeeper.

He spent the better part of his professional career with Betis, appearing in 95 competitive matches and winning one Copa del Rey. He also had several spells with Xerez and Zaragoza.

== Club career ==
=== Spain ===
Born in Bellavista, Seville, Doblas spent four seasons with local Real Betis's B-team, where he was the undisputed starter before moving on loan to Andalusian neighbours Xerez. He made only four appearances in the second division and returned to Betis' first side the year after, being called into immediate main-squad action due to injuries to Pedro Contreras and Toni Prats.

Doblas made his La Liga debut against Getafe on 24 October 2004, in a 2–0 away win. He remained a starter for the remainder of the campaign, taking part in the 2005 Copa del Rey final against Osasuna which Betis won 2–1; in the competition's semi-final second leg against Athletic Bilbao he saved two penalties in a shootout and, in August 2005, he signed his first professional contract at already 25.

Doblas was also a key element in Betis' first-ever qualification to the UEFA Champions League, as he saved a Camel Meriem penalty against Monaco in the third qualify round, a 3–2 win. During the league season, errors cost him his position, which was regained by Contreras: his most notable mistake came against Chelsea at Stamford Bridge, when he gave Ricardo Carvalho a goal in an eventual 0–4 Champions League loss; he still managed 24 league appearances, a situation repeated (also with Contreras as backup) in the 2006–07 campaign.

Midway through 2007–08, Doblas suffered a serious injury in a friendly that kept him out of action for five months – he was supposed to battle for first-choice status with new signing Ricardo. He was reinstated in the squad in late April, donning nº 25 after teammate Rafael Sobis switched to 21; in June 2008 he was released by Betis and, on 1 September, joined second level side Real Zaragoza, meeting the same fate at the end of the season.

On 8 September 2009, Doblas was supposed to sign for Aris in Greece for one year, joining a squad with three other countrymen and with Donato who played in Spain for 15 years as assistant manager; eventually, the deal fell through and he returned to Spain, moving to Huesca in early November.

Doblas returned to Zaragoza on 9 July 2010, signing a two-year deal with an option to a third season. In the following off-season, after having shared first-choice duties with Leo Franco as the club narrowly avoided top level relegation, he was loaned to another former club, Xerez.

=== Abroad / Later years ===
In January 2013, Doblas signed an 18-month contract with Azerbaijan Premier League side Khazar Lankaran. Six months later, following an 0–8 home defeat to Maccabi Haifa in the UEFA Europa League's second qualifying round, he was one of four players to have their contracts terminated.

On 27 February 2014, Doblas moved to Serie A side Napoli for four months, as the Rafael Benítez-led team had several problems in the goalkeeper position, most notably Rafael Cabral who suffered a season-ending injury. On 12 August, he changed clubs and countries again, signing with HJK as a short-term replacement for Michael Tørnes.

In November 2014, Doblas became involved in a match-fixing investigation surrounding the 21 May 2011 fixture between Zaragoza and Levante. On 29 August of the following year, following a brief spell back in his country with lowly Cornellà, he signed for Indian Super League franchise Delhi Dynamos.

Until his retirement, Doblas represented in quick succession Toledo, Delhi Dynamos again, Extremadura and San Fernando. In December 2017, the 37-year-old moved to Ceres-Negros of the Philippines Football League, with the deal being made effective at the start of the 2018 season.

== Personal life ==
During his career, Doblas majored in journalism.

== Club statistics ==
As of 25 April 2018

Club	Season	League			Cup		Continental		Total	
Club	Season	Division	Apps	Goals	Apps	Goals	Apps	Goals	Apps	Goals
Betis B	1998–98	Segunda División B	1	0	—		—		1	0
Betis B	1999–2000	Segunda División B	30	0	—		—		30	0
Betis B	2000–01	Segunda División B	33	0	—		—		33	0
Betis B	2001–02	Segunda División B	35	0	—		—		35	0
Betis B	Total		99	0	—		—		99	0
Betis	2004–05	La Liga	29	0	5	0	—		34	0
Betis	2005–06	La Liga	24	0	5 (Note: Includes 1 appearance in Supercopa de España)	0	8 (Note: Appearances in UEFA Champions League and UEFA Europa League)	0	37	0
Betis	2006–07	La Liga	22	0	1	0	—		23	0
Betis	2007–08	La Liga	1	0	0	0	—		1	0
Betis	Total		76	0	11	0	8	0	95	0
Xerez (loan)	2003–04	Segunda División	4	0	2	0	—		6	0
Zaragoza	2008–09	Segunda División	18	0	0	0	—		18	0
Huesca	2009–10	Segunda División	29	0	0	0	—		29	0
Zaragoza	2010–11	La Liga	18	0	2	0	—		20	0
Zaragoza	2012–13	La Liga	0	0	0	0	—		0	0
Zaragoza	Total		18	0	2	0	—		20	0
Xerez (loan)	2011–12	Segunda División	36	0	1	0	—		37	0
Khazar Lankaran	2012–13	Azerbaijan Premier League	7	0	3	0	—		10	0
Khazar Lankaran	2013–14	Azerbaijan Premier League	0	0	0	0	4 (Note: Appearances in UEFA Europa League)	0	4	0
Khazar Lankaran	Total		7	0	3	0	4	0	14	0
Napoli	2013–14	Serie A	2	0	0	0	—		2	0
HJK	2014	Veikkausliiga	5	0	1	0	8	0	14	0
Cornellà	2014–15	Segunda División B	9	0	—		—		9	0
Delhi Dynamos	2015	Indian Super League	12	0	—		—		12	0
Extremadura	2016–17	Segunda División B	18	0	0	0	—		18	0
San Fernando	2017–18	Segunda División B	18	0	0	0	—		18	0
Ceres-Negros	2018	Philippines Football League			0	0	9 (Note: Appearances in AFC Cup and AFC Champions League)	0	9	0
Career total			351	0	19	0	29	0	399	0

== Honours ==
Betis

- Copa del Rey: 2004–05

Napoli

- Coppa Italia: 2013–14

HJK

- Veikkausliiga: 2014
- Finnish Cup: 2014
