= Alberto Rivera (footballer) =

Spanish footballer (born 1978)

Personal information
- Full name: Alberto Rivera Pizarro
- Date of birth: 16 February 1978 (age 48)
- Place of birth: Puertollano, Spain
- Height: 1.70 m (5 ft 7 in)
- Position: Central midfielder

Youth career
- Real Madrid

Senior career*
Years	Team	Apps	(Gls)
1995–1997	Real Madrid C	68	(15)
1995–2002	Real Madrid	3	(1)
1996–1999	Real Madrid B	84	(23)
1999–2000	→ Numancia (loan)	29	(1)
2002	→ Marseille (loan)	12	(2)
2002–2005	Levante	113	(17)
2005–2009	Betis	107	(2)
2009–2012	Sporting Gijón	93	(1)
2012–2014	Elche	51	(0)
Total		560	(62)

International career
1993–1994	Spain U16	14	(3)
1995–1996	Spain U18	13	(7)
1997	Spain U20	7	(2)
- * Club domestic league appearances and goals

Alberto Rivera Pizarro (born 16 February 1978) is a Spanish former professional footballer who played as a central midfielder.

He started out at Real Madrid, but played almost exclusively for its reserve teams during his spell. In a senior career that spanned nearly two decades, he amassed La Liga totals of 282 matches and ten goals over 12 seasons, also representing in the competition Numancia, Levante, Betis, Sporting de Gijón and Elche.

== Club career ==
=== Real Madrid ===
Rivera was born in Puertollano, Ciudad Real, Castilla–La Mancha. A product of Real Madrid's youth academy, he made his first-team debut (his only appearance for the main squad during 1994–95), scoring in a 2–0 away win against RC Celta de Vigo with the La Liga title race already decided in their favour while becoming the youngest player to score in an official match in the club's history at the age of 17 years and 114 days. He started his senior career with the C team in the Segunda División B, playing two additional full seasons with Real Madrid Castilla in the same level and appearing in five Segunda División games with the latter.

For 1999–2000, Rivera signed with CD Numancia in a loan deal. After helping the Sorians to barely avoid top-division relegation, he returned to Real Madrid, where he was featured in two additional league games the following season. In January 2002 he had another loan spell, with Olympique de Marseille to where he moved alongside Alfonso Pérez from FC Barcelona, and appeared regularly for the French Ligue 1 side until the end of the campaign, in an eventual ninth-place finish.

=== Levante and Betis ===
Rivera joined Levante UD in 2002, with the team in the second division. He was an undisputed starter in three seasons, netting a career-high 11 goals in 2003–04's promotion before moving to Real Betis upon Levante's immediate relegation (having played all the matches but one, with five goals), for €3.4 million.

Rivera made 34 league appearances in 2005–06, adding seven in the UEFA Champions League and three in the UEFA Cup, without finding the net however. The following campaign he played 27 times, scoring his first goal in a 3–2 defeat at Villarreal CF on 5 November 2006.

=== Sporting Gijón ===
In mid-June 2009, having rejected Betis' offer of a new deal, and with the Andalusians having been relegated, Rivera signed a one-year contract with fellow top-tier club Sporting de Gijón – with the option for a further two – which had barely retained its status, arriving on a free transfer and reuniting with former Levante boss Manolo Preciado. At the end of his second season, he received the Fair Play Award given by the Liga Nacional de Fútbol Profesional.

Rivera appeared in an average of 31 games during his spell in Asturias, suffering top-flight relegation in his third and final year. He retired in summer 2014 at the age of 36 after two seasons with Elche CF, the latter spent in the main division.

== Post-retirement ==
After retiring, Rivera started running marathons.

== Honours ==
Real Madrid

- La Liga: 1994–95, 2000–01

Levante

- Segunda División: 2003–04

Elche

- Segunda División: 2012–13

Individual

- La Liga Fair Play Award: 2010–11
