= Arzu (footballer) =

Spanish footballer

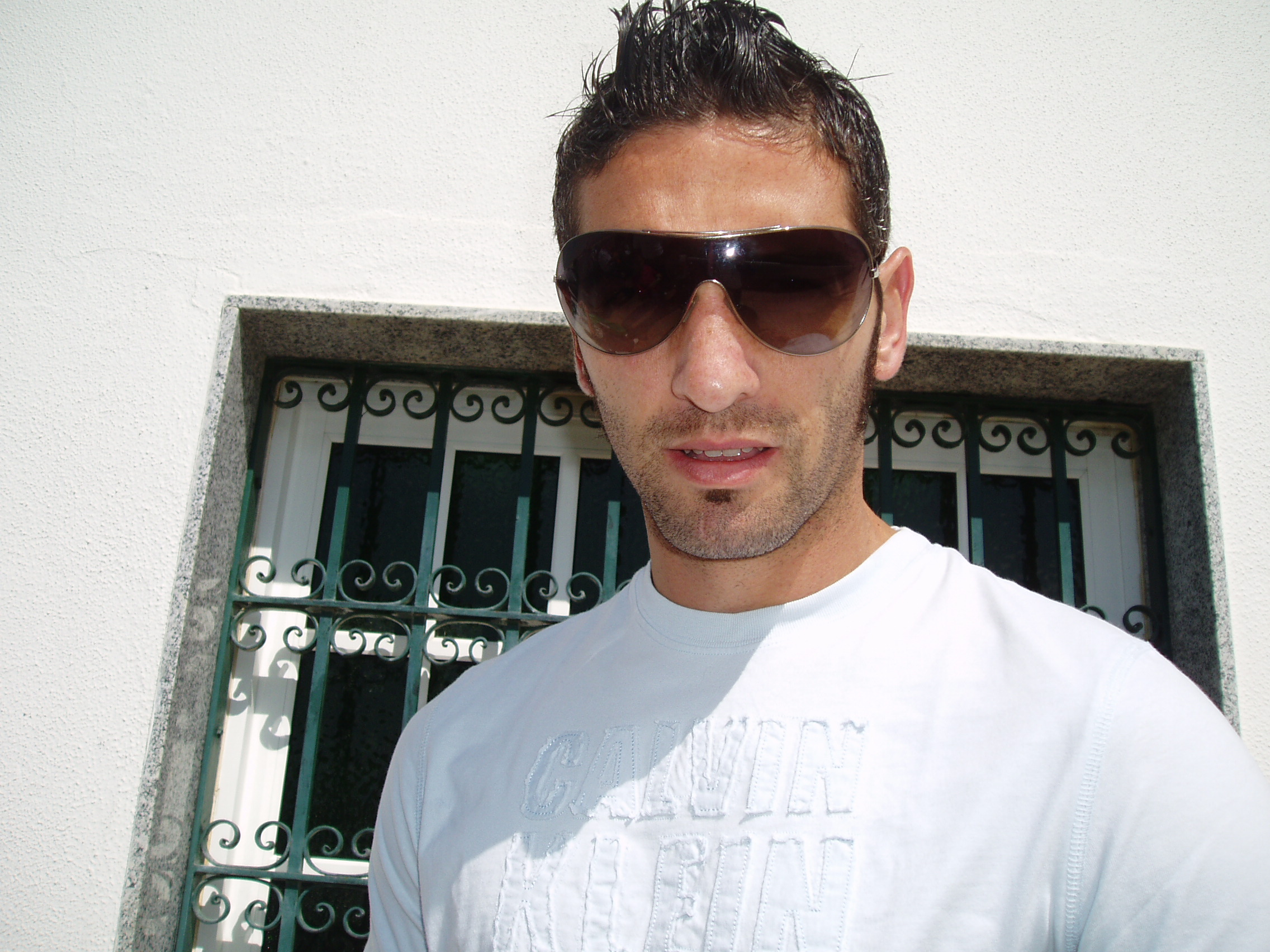
- Arzu in 2008

Personal information
- Full name: Arturo García Muñoz
- Date of birth: 17 March 1981 (age 45)
- Place of birth: Dos Hermanas, Spain
- Height: 1.84 m (6 ft 0 in)
- Positions: Defensive midfielder; centre-back

Youth career
- Betis

Senior career*
Years	Team	Apps	(Gls)
1999–2001	Betis B	33	(4)
2000–2011	Betis	270	(12)
2001–2002	→ Córdoba (loan)	22	(1)
2011–2012	Gimnàstic	29	(0)
2012–2013	BEC Tero Sasana	16	(2)
Total		370	(19)

International career
2001	Spain U20	1	(0)
2002–2003	Spain U21	10	(0)

Managerial career
- 2014–2019: Betis C (assistant)
- 2019–2022: Betis B (assistant)
- 2022–2024: Betis (youth)
- 2024–2025: Betis B
- 2025–2026: Recreativo
- * Club domestic league appearances and goals

Arturo García Muñoz (born 17 March 1981), known as Arzu, is a Spanish former professional footballer who played as a defensive midfielder or a central defender. He is currently a manager.

He spent most of his career with Betis, appearing in 200 La Liga games in seven seasons (11 years with the club, 317 competitive matches) and winning the 2005 Copa del Rey.

== Playing career ==
=== Betis ===
A product of Andalusian club Real Betis's youth system, Arzu was born in Dos Hermanas, Province of Seville, and he played for its B team during the 1999–2000 season, in the Segunda División B. In the following campaign, he made his debut with the main squad, helping them to achieve promotion from Segunda División with 16 matches and two goals but subsequently staying at that level, being loaned to neighbours Córdoba CF.

In his first season in La Liga, Arzu scored four times from 35 appearances, including one in the 4–2 away win against Deportivo de La Coruña on 1 September 2002 to open the league. He totalled a further 60 games from 2003 to 2005, as Betis finished ninth and fourth respectively.

Arzu appeared in eight European matches in the 2005–06 campaign: four in the UEFA Champions League (scoring against Liverpool in a 2–1 group-stage home loss) and four in the UEFA Cup. On 13 May 2006, his 75th-minute equaliser in the 1–1 draw at Atlético Madrid in the last matchday proved crucial as the Verdiblancos barely avoided relegation.

Still a defensive cornerstone in 2008–09, Arzu made 34 appearances – mostly as a centre-back– but Betis were relegated for the first time in eight years. In August 2011, after only taking part in 17 games as the side returned to the top flight, he was released from his contract.

=== Later career ===
On the penultimate day of the 2011 summer transfer window, Arzu signed with second-tier Gimnàstic de Tarragona. The following 7 May, he terminated his contract with the Catalans (who suffered relegation) by mutual consent.

In August 2012, aged 31, Arzu moved abroad for the first time, joining Thai Premier League club BEC Tero Sasana FC.

== Coaching career ==
After retiring, Arzu began working as a manager, starting off as assistant of Betis C and later having the same role with the reserves. In summer 2022, he was named head coach of the club's youth sides, being appointed at Betis B in the Segunda Federación for the rest of the season on 27 March 2024, following the departure of Alberto González.

On 26 May 2025, Arzu left Betis Deportivo.

== Managerial statistics ==
As of 3 May 2026

Managerial record by team and tenure
Team	Nat	From	To	Record								Ref
Team	Nat	From	To	G	W	D	L	GF	GA	GD	Win %	Ref
Betis B	(Spain)	27 March 2024	26 May 2025	48	16	17	15	60	66	−6	33.33	
Recreativo	(Spain)	27 November 2025	22 May 2026	23	11	7	5	29	15	+14	47.83	
Total				71	27	24	20	89	81	+8	38.03	—

== Honours ==
Betis

- Copa del Rey: 2004–05
- Segunda División: 2010–11
