= Capi (footballer, born 1977) =

Spanish footballer

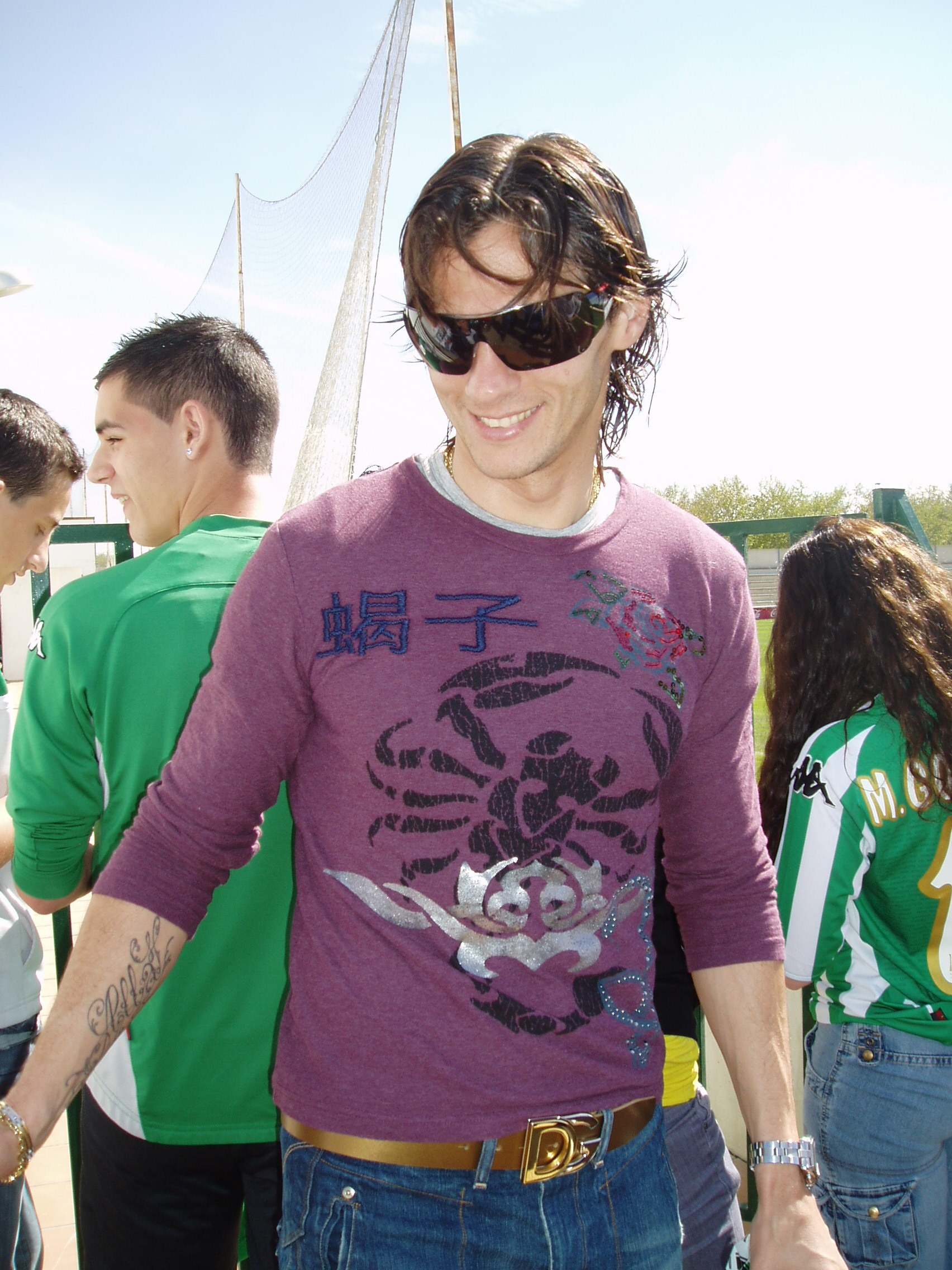
- Capi with Betis in 2008

Personal information
- Full name: Jesús Capitán Prada
- Date of birth: 26 March 1977 (age 49)
- Place of birth: Camas, Spain
- Height: 1.75 m (5 ft 9 in)
- Position: Attacking midfielder

Youth career
- Camas
- Betis

Senior career*
| Years | Team | Apps | (Gls) |
| 1995–1999 | Betis B | 127 | (11) |
| 1997–2010 | Betis | 269 | (19) |
| 1999–2000 | → Granada (loan) | 33 | (4) |
| 2010–2012 | Xerez | 59 | (3) |
| 2012–2014 | Camas | | |
| Total | | 488 | (37) |

International career
| 2002 | Spain | 4 | (0) |

Managerial career
- 2014–2016: Betis B (assistant)
- 2018–2019: Camas (youth)
- 2019–2021: Camas
- 2022–2023: Betis C
- * Club domestic league appearances and goals

Jesús Capitán Prada (born 26 March 1977), known as Capi, is a Spanish former professional footballer who played as an attacking midfielder.

He spent most of his career with Betis, which included 209 La Liga games and 16 goals over the course of nine seasons (13 overall).

== Club career ==
=== Betis ===
Capi was born in Camas, Seville, Andalusia. Apart from a loan spell at Granada CF in the Segunda División B, he spent the vast majority of his career at Real Betis. He started out with their reserves in the same league, and made his first-team and La Liga debut against Valencia CF on 26 May 1997, one of only two during the season.

Capi went to play 302 competitive games for the Estadio Benito Villamarín-based club, always as an important part of the squad. He scored his first goal for them on 19 November 2000, albeit in a 1–3 home defeat to neighbouring Sevilla FC where he excelled before being stretchered off with 15 minutes to go and the score at 1–1, as the campaign in the Segunda División ended in promotion for both sides in the city. However, in 2004–05, as the team achieved a fourth place in the league, with qualification to the UEFA Champions League, he appeared in only 11 matches, mainly due to injuries.

After another two-and-a-half-month spell in the sidelines, Capi returned to action on 4 April 2009, scoring as a second-half substitute in a 3–3 home draw with CD Numancia. Betis were eventually relegated to the second tier.

Capi continued to be bothered with injuries in the 2009–10 season, but still contributed 26 appearances – only three complete – as the club failed to regain its lost status. On 19 June 2010, the 33-year-old appeared in his last game as a Verdiblanco, the useless 4–0 home win over Levante UD (they finished in fourth place, tied with both the second and third-placed teams), his contract subsequently expiring and not being renewed.

=== Later career ===
In summer 2012, at the end of a couple of second-division campaigns with another side in his native region, Xerez CD, Capi signed with amateurs Camas Club de Fútbol, his first-ever club as a footballer.

== International career ==
Capi earned four caps for the Spain national team, making his debut on 27 March 2002 against the Netherlands in a 1–0 friendly loss in Rotterdam. He featured in a further three internationals the same year.

== Coaching career ==
Capi retired in 2014 at age 37, being immediately appointed as Juan Merino's assistant manager at Betis B. On 16 August 2022, he became head coach of the club's C team.

== Honours ==
Betis

- Copa del Rey: 2004–05
