= David Rivas =

Spanish retired footballer (born 1978)

Personal information
- Full name: David Rivas Rodríguez
- Date of birth: 2 December 1978 (age 47)
- Place of birth: Dos Hermanas, Spain
- Height: 1.90 m (6 ft 3 in)
- Position: Centre-back

Youth career
- Betis

Senior career*
Years	Team	Apps	(Gls)
1997–1999	Betis B	38	(4)
1997–1998	→ Dos Hermanas (loan)		
1999–2010	Betis	202	(8)
2010–2011	Vaslui	10	(0)
2011–2013	Huesca	39	(0)
Total		289	(12)
Medal record
Betis
First place	Copa del Rey	2005
- * Club domestic league appearances and goals

David Rivas Rodríguez (born 2 December 1978) is a Spanish former professional footballer who played as a central defender.

He spent most of his 16-year career with Betis, appearing in 244 competitive games and winning the 2005 Copa del Rey. In La Liga, he totalled 171 matches and seven goals in nine seasons.

== Club career ==
Rivas was born in Dos Hermanas, Province of Seville. Having previously played with the club's reserves, he spent the vast majority of his professional career at Real Betis, making his first-team – and La Liga – debut during the 1999–2000 season: his first game was on 21 August 1999 as he started in a 1–0 away loss against Athletic Bilbao, with his team eventually suffering relegation. He contributed 20 Segunda División matches the following campaign, in an immediate promotion.

Rivas went on to become an important defensive element for the Andalusians in subsequent years, becoming their captain and scoring four goals from 32 appearances in 2004–05 as Betis achieved qualification for the UEFA Champions League (Juanito, the other stopper, added another four). Afterwards, however, dramatic loss of form and a bad run with injuries meant he featured sparingly for the side.

In July 2010, after only 42 league appearances over four seasons, the 31-year-old Rivas left Betis and Spain for the first time, joining Liga I club FC Vaslui. In September of the following year, he returned to his homeland and signed for SD Huesca in the second tier.

== Honours ==
Betis

- Copa del Rey: 2004–05
