= 2004–05 Copa del Rey =

103rd Copa del Rey

Tournament details
- Country: Spain

Final positions
- Champions: Real Betis (2nd title)
- Runners-up: Osasuna

Tournament statistics
- Top goal scorer(s): Alejandro; Aitor Huegún; Iñaki Muñoz (5 goals each)

The 2004–05 Copa del Rey was the 103rd staging of the Copa del Rey.

The competition started on 1 September 2004 and concluded on 1 June 2005 with the Final, held at the Estadio Vicente Calderón in Madrid, in which Real Betis lifted the trophy for the first time since 1977 with a 2–1 victory over CA Osasuna.

== First round ==
Team 1	Agg.	Team 2	1st leg	2nd leg
CD Móstoles	3–4	UD Vecindario	1–2	2–2
CCD Cerceda	5–1	Castillo CF	3–1	2–0
Santa Eulalia	2–6	UD Lanzarote	1–4	1–2
CD Ourense	2–0	Pájara Playas	1–0	1–0
SD Noja	3–3 (a)	CD Recreación	3–3	0–0
Gimnástica Segoviana CF	2–1	Sestao River Club	0–1	2–0
Real Oviedo	1–2	Amurrio Club	0–0	1–2
Burgos CF	3–1	SD Ponferradina	1–1	2–0
Utebo FC	1–5	CF Badalona	1–0	0–5
Girona FC	1–0	Alicante CF	1–0	0–0
CM Peralta	2–3	CD Castellón	1–1	1–2
Benidorm CD	2–4	UDA Gramenet	2–1	0–3
Granada CF	1–3	AD Ceuta	0–2	1–1
AD Mar Menor	1–3	Lorca Deportiva CF	0–0	1–3
CD Quintanar del Rey	1–4	CD Alcalá	1–1	0–3
CD Don Benito	2–1	UD Melilla	1–0	1–1
CD Badajoz	1–2	UB Conquense	1–0	0–2

== Round of 64 ==
26 October 2004
CCD Cerceda	0–2	Deportivo de La Coruña
CD Castellón	0–0 (2–4 PP)	CA Osasuna
CD Leganés	1–2	Real Madrid

27 October 2004
Logroñés CF	0–3	CD Numancia
Amurrio Club	2–3 AET	Racing de Santander
Gimnástica Segoviana CF	0–1	Athletic Bilbao
SD Eibar	0–0 (2–4 PP)	Real Valladolid
Terrassa FC	1–1 (4–2 PP)	RCD Espanyol
UE Lleida	1–0	Valencia CF
Algeciras CF	0–1	Sevilla FC
CD Don Benito	0–2	Málaga CF
Xerez CD	0–1	Ciudad de Murcia
CF Badalona	0–0 (3–4 PP)	Levante UD
UD Las Palmas	0–1	Getafe CF
Rayo Vallecano	0–1 AET	RCD Mallorca
CD Alcalá	0–0 (2–4 PP)	Real Betis
AD Ceuta	0–1 AET	Albacete Balompié
Cultural Leonesa	1–1 (3–2 PP)	Deportivo Alavés
UDA Gramenet	1–0 AET	FC Barcelona
CD Ourense	0–3	Atlético Madrid
UD Lanzarote	3–2	Racing de Ferrol
Sporting de Gijón	1–2	Elche CF
Cádiz CF	4–0	Polideportivo Ejido
Gimnàstic de Tarragona	2–1	Real Zaragoza
CD Tenerife	3–1 AET	Celta de Vigo
Burgos CF	1–3	Real Sociedad
UD Vecindario	2–3 AET	Pontevedra CF
CD Mirandés	3–2 AET	UD Salamanca
Lorca Deportiva	4–1	Real Murcia

28 October 2004
Girona FC	2–1	Villarreal CF

3 November 2004
Córdoba CF	0–0 (4–3 PP)	UD Almería

4 November 2004
UB Conquense	0–2 (AET)	Recreativo de Huelva

== Round of 32 ==
10 November 2004
UD Lanzarote	2–1	RCD Mallorca
Pontevedra CF	1–2 AET	Getafe CF
CD Tenerife	1–2	Real Madrid
CD Mirandés	0–0 (4–3 PP)	Real Sociedad
Cultural Leonesa	1–2 (AET)	Athletic Bilbao
Real Valladolid	2–1	Racing de Santander
UDA Gramenet	2–1	Levante UD
Girona FC	0–1 AET	CA Osasuna
Lorca Deportiva	5–2 AET	Málaga CF
Ciudad de Murcia	1–2	Sevilla FC
Elche CF	1–0	Deportivo de La Coruña
Terrassa FC	2–2 (2–4 PP)	UE Lleida
Cádiz CF	0–2	Real Betis
Córdoba CF	1–1 (3–4 PP)	CD Numancia
Recreativo de Huelva	1–0 AET	Albacete Balompié

11 November 2004
Gimnàstic de Tarragona	0–1 AET	Atlético Madrid

== Knock-out rounds ==
First round
1	UDA Gramenet	2	0	2
16	UE Lleida	0	1	1
8	CD Mirandés	1	0	1
9	Real Betis	3	0	3
5	UD Lanzarote	2	0	2
12	Athletic Bilbao	1	6	7
4	Real Valladolid (a)	0	1	1
13	Real Madrid	0	1	1
6	Recreativo de Huelva	0	1	1
11	Sevilla FC	2	2	4
3	CA Osasuna	2	2	4
14	Getafe CF	0	3	3
7	Elche CF	1	0	1 (3)
10	CD Numancia (p)	0	1	1 (5)
2	Lorca CF	1	0	1
15	Atlético Madrid	3	2	5

Quarter-finals
UDA Gramenet	2	3	5
Real Betis	2	4	6
Athletic Bilbao	3	1	4
Real Valladolid	2	1	3
Sevilla FC	2	1	3
CA Osasuna	1	3	4
CD Numancia	0	0	0
Atlético Madrid	0	1	1

Semi-finals
Real Betis (p)	0	0	0 (5)
Athletic Bilbao	0	0	0 (4)
CA Osasuna	1	0	1
Atlético Madrid	0	0	0

Final
Real Betis (AET)	2
CA Osasuna	1

== Round of 16 ==
Team 1	Agg.	Team 2	1st leg	2nd leg
Recreativo de Huelva	1–4	Sevilla FC	0–2	1–2
UDA Gramenet	2–1	UE Lleida	2–0	0–1
UD Lanzarote	2–7	Athletic Bilbao	2–1	0–6
Lorca CF	1–5	Atlético Madrid	1–3	0–2
CD Mirandés	1–3	Real Betis	1–3	0–0
Elche CF	1–1 (3–5 pen)	CD Numancia	1–0	0–1
CA Osasuna	4–3	Getafe CF	2–0	2–3
Real Valladolid	(a) 1–1	Real Madrid	0–0	1–1

=== First leg ===
11 January 2005	Recreativo de Huelva	0-2	Sevilla FC	Estadio Nuevo Colombino, Huelva

11 January 2005	UDA Gramenet	2-0	UE Lleida	Nou Camp Municipal, Santa Coloma de Gramenet

11 January 2005
UDA Gramenet	2–0	UE Lleida

12 January 2005
UD Lanzarote	2–1	Athletic Bilbao
Lorca CF	1–3	Atlético Madrid
CD Mirandés	1–3	Real Betis
Elche CF	1–0	CD Numancia
CA Osasuna	2–0	Getafe CF

13 January 2005
Real Valladolid	0–0	Real Madrid

=== Second leg ===
18 January 2005	UE Lleida	1-0	UDA Gramenet	Camp d'Esports, Lleida

18 January 2005
Sevilla FC	2–1	Recreativo de Huelva	Agg: 4–1
UE Lleida	1–0	UDA Gramenet	Agg: 1–2

19 January 2005
Athletic Bilbao	6–0	UD Lanzarote	Agg: 7–2
Real Madrid	1–1	Real Valladolid	Agg: 1–1
Real Betis	0–0	CD Mirandés	Agg: 3–1
CD Numancia	1–0	Elche CF	Agg: 1–1 (5–3 PP)
Getafe CF	3–2	CA Osasuna	Agg: 3–4

20 January 2005
Atlético Madrid	2–0	Lorca CF	Agg: 5–1

== Quarter-finals ==
Team 1	Agg.	Team 2	1st leg	2nd leg
Athletic Bilbao	4–2	Real Valladolid	3–2	1–0
Sevilla FC	3–4	CA Osasuna	2–1	1–3
UDA Gramenet	5–6	Real Betis	2–2	3–4
CD Numancia	0–1	Atlético Madrid	0–0	0–1

=== First leg ===
25 January 2005	Athletic Bilbao	3–2	Real Valladolid	Estadio San Mamés, Bilbao
21:00 CEST	del Horno 18'; Ezquerro 72'; Iraola 78' (pen.)	(Report)	Muñoz 8'; Aduriz 86' (pen.)	Referee: Manuel Mejuto González

26 January 2005	Sevilla	2–1	Osasuna	Estadio Ramón Sánchez Pizjuán, Sevilla
21:00 CEST	Antoñito 20'; Navas 78'	(Report)	Aloisi 37' (pen.)	Referee: César Muñiz Fernández

27 January 2005	Gramenet	2–2	Real Betis	Municipal de Santa Coloma, Santa Coloma de Gramenet
21:00 CEST	Juanito 21' (o.g.); Ollés 51'	(Report)	Fernando 15'; Assunção 74'	Referee: Bernardino González Vázquez

2 February 2005	Numancia	0–0	Atlético Madrid	Nuevo Estadio Los Pajaritos, Soria
21:00 CEST		(Report)		Referee: Alfonso Pérez Burrull

=== Second leg ===
2 February 2005	Osasuna	3–1	Sevilla	Estadio Reyno de Navarra, Pamplona
21:00 CEST	Valdo 25'; Cuéllar 70'; Muñoz 86'	(Report)	Makukula 88'	Referee: Miguel Ángel Pérez Lasa

2 February 2005	Real Betis	4–3	Gramenet	Estadio Manuel Ruiz de Lopera, Sevilla
21:00 CEST	Fernando 22'; Rivas 25'; Oliveira 57'; Assunção 85'	(Report)	Miki 52'; Rubén Blaya 67'; Aarón 87'	Referee: Alberto Undiano Mallenco

3 February 2005	Real Valladolid	0–1	Athletic Bilbao	Estadio José Zorrilla, Valladolid
21:00 CEST		(Report)	Yeste 73' (pen.)	Referee: Ramírez Domínguez

16 February 2005	Atlético Madrid	1–0	Numancia	Estadio Vicente Calderón, Madrid
21:00 CEST	Torres 66' (pen.)	(Report)		Referee: Carmona Méndez

== Semi-finals ==
Team 1	Agg.	Team 2	1st leg	2nd leg
CA Osasuna	1–0	Atlético Madrid	1–0	0–0
Real Betis	0–0 (5–4 pen)	Athletic Bilbao	0–0	0–0

=== First leg ===
20 April 2005	Osasuna	1–0	Atlético Madrid	Estadio Reyno de Navarra, Pamplona
21:00 CEST	Valdo 27'	(Report)		Referee: Rodríguez Santiago

21 April 2005	Real Betis	0–0	Athletic Bilbao	Estadio Manuel Ruiz de Lopera, Seville
21:00 CEST		(report)		Referee: Arturo Daudén Ibáñez

=== Second leg ===
11 May 2005	Athletic Bilbao	0–0 (4–5 p)	Real Betis	Estadio San Mamés, Bilbao
21:00 CEST		(Report)		Referee: Carlos Megía Dávila
	Penalties
	Del Horno (penalty missed); Yeste (penalty scored); Tiko (penalty scored); Orbaiz (penalty scored); Iraola (penalty scored); Ezquerro (penalty missed)		(penalty scored) Assunção; (penalty missed) Oliveira; (penalty scored) Joaquín; (penalty scored) Denílson; (penalty scored) Lembo; (penalty scored) L. Fernández

12 May 2005	Atlético Madrid	0–0	Osasuna	Estadio Vicente Calderón, Madrid
21:00 CEST		(Report)		Referee: Luis Medina Cantalejo

== Final ==
11 June 2005
21:00 CEST

Osasuna	1–2	Real Betis
Aloisi 82'	Report	Oliveira 74'; Dani 114'

Vicente Calderón, Madrid
Attendance: 55,000
Referee: Pérez Burrull (Cantabria)

== Top goalscorers ==
Goalscorers	Goals	Team
(Spain) Alejandro	5	Lanzarote
(Spain) Iñaki Muñoz	5	Osasuna
(Spain) Aitor Huegún	5	Lorca
(Brazil) Ricardo Oliveira	4	Betis
(Spain) Braulio	3	Atlético Madrid
(Spain) Maciot	3	Lanzarote
(Spain) Santi Ezquerro	3	Athletic Bilbao
(Spain) Miki Albert	3	Gramenet
(Spain) Fernando Llorente	3	Athletic Bilbao
