= 2007–08 Getafe CF season =

Getafe CF
2007–08 season
- Manager: Michael Laudrup
- Stadium: Coliseum Alfonso Pérez
- La Liga: 14th
- UEFA Cup: Quarter-finals
- Copa del Rey: Runners-up

During the 2007–08 Spanish football season, Getafe competed in La Liga.

== Season summary ==
For the second season running, Getafe were runners-up in the Copa del Rey; however, this time they failed to qualify for the UEFA Cup, as cup winners Valencia did not qualify for Europe for the league. Getafe had enjoyed a good run in the UEFA Cup, reaching the quarter-finals before knocked out on away goals by German giants Bayern Munich.

At the end of the season, manager Michael Laudrup tendered his resignation, having completed only one season with the team. Víctor Muñoz was appointed to replace him.

== First-team squad ==
Squad at end of season

Note: Flags indicate national team as defined under FIFA eligibility rules; some limited exceptions apply. Players may hold more than one non-FIFA nationality.

No.	Pos.	Nation	Player
1	GK	ARG	Óscar Ustari
2	DF	ROU	Cosmin Contra
3	DF	ARG	Daniel Díaz
4	DF	ESP	David Belenguer
5	DF	ESP	Pedro
6	MF	SUI	Fabio Celestini
7	MF	ESP	Mario Cotelo
8	MF	ESP	Jaime Gavilán (on loan from Valencia)
9	FW	ESP	Braulio Nóbrega (on loan from Atlético Madrid)
10	MF	ESP	Rubén de la Red
11	MF	ESP	David Sousa
12	DF	ARG	Lucas Licht
13	GK	ARG	Roberto Abbondanzieri
14	FW	ESP	Manu
15	FW	FRA	Bertrand Fontaine

No.	Pos.	Nation	Player
16	MF	URU	Juan Albín
17	FW	ESP	Kepa
18	FW	NGA	Ikechukwu Uche
19	DF	FRA	Franck Signorino
20	MF	ESP	Miguel Pallardó (on loan from Valencia)
21	DF	ESP	David Cortés
22	MF	ESP	Javier Casquero
23	DF	ESP	Manuel Tena
24	MF	ESP	Pablo Hernández
25	MF	ESP	Esteban Granero
26	DF	ESP	Juanfran
27	MF	ESP	Manu Hervás
28	MF	ESP	Richi de Souza
29	DF	ESP	Víctor Mesa
32	GK	ESP	Francisco Galán

=== Left club during season ===
Note: Flags indicate national team as defined under FIFA eligibility rules; some limited exceptions apply. Players may hold more than one non-FIFA nationality.

No.	Pos.	Nation	Player
1	GK	ESP	Luis García (on loan to Celta de Vigo)
8	DF	ESP	Alberto (to Granada 74)

No.	Pos.	Nation	Player
10	MF	ESP	Pablo Redondo (de-registered)
15	DF	ESP	Nacho (on loan to Real Sociedad)
