= 2008 Copa del Rey final =

- Event: 2007–08 Copa del Rey
Getafe	Valencia
1	3
- Date: 16 April 2008
- Venue: Vicente Calderón, Madrid
- Referee: Alberto Undiano Mallenco
- Attendance: 54,000
- Weather: Mostly cloudy 14 °C (57 °F)

The 2008 Copa del Rey final was the 106th final of the Spanish cup competition, the Copa del Rey. The final was played at Vicente Calderón in Madrid, on 16 April 2008.

The match was won by Valencia, who beat Getafe 3–1, winning the tournament for the seventh time. It was a second defeat in the final in succession for Getafe, who also lost to Sevilla in 2007. These had been their only appearances in the event; by contrast it was Valencia's 16th final.

== Road to the final ==
Getafe			Round	Valencia
Opponent	Result	Legs		Opponent	Result	Legs
Burgos	5–1	0–1 away; 4–1 home	Round of 32	Real Unión	5–1	1–2 away; 3–0 home
Levante	4–0	3–0 home; 0–1 away	Round of 16	Real Betis	4–2	1–2 away; 2–1 home
Mallorca	2–2	1–0 home; 1–2 away	Quarterfinals	Atlético Madrid	3–3	1–0 home; 2–3 away
Racing Santander	4–2	3–1 home; 1–1 away	Semifinals	Barcelona	4–3	1–1 away; 3–2 home

== Match details ==
16 April 2008
22:00 CEST

Getafe	1–3	Valencia
Granero 45' (pen.)		Mata 4'; Alexis 11'; Morientes 84'

Vicente Calderón, Madrid
Attendance: 54,000
Referee: Alberto Undiano Mallenco

Getafe

GK	1	(Argentina) Óscar Ustari
RB	21	(Spain) David Cortés
CB	3	(Argentina) Cata Díaz	(yellow card) 82'
CB	23	(Spain) Manuel Tena	(c)	(substituted off) 78'
LB	12	(Argentina) Lucas Licht	(yellow card) 31'
RW	2	(Romania) Cosmin Contra		(substituted off) 55'
MF	10	(Spain) Rubén de la Red
MF	22	(Spain) Javier Casquero	(yellow card) 42'	(substituted off) 64'
LW	25	(Spain) Esteban Granero	(yellow card) 32'
FW	14	(Spain) Manu
FW	16	(Uruguay) Juan Albín
Substitutes:
GK	13	(Argentina) Roberto Abbondanzieri
CB	4	(Spain) David Belenguer
MF	6	(Switzerland) Fabio Celestini	(red card) 89'	(substituted on) 64'
RW	7	(Spain) Mario Cotelo
MF	11	(Spain) David Sousa
MF	24	(Spain) Pablo Hernández		(substituted on) 55'
FW	9	(Spain) Braulio		(substituted on) 78'
Manager:
(Denmark) Michael Laudrup

GK	13	(Germany) Timo Hildebrand
RB	23	(Portugal) Miguel	(yellow card) 22'
CB	4	(Spain) Raúl Albiol		(substituted off) 57'
CB	20	(Spain) Alexis	(yellow card) 38'
LB	24	(Italy) Emiliano Moretti		(substituted off) 66'
DM	5	(Spain) Carlos Marchena	(yellow card) 67'
CM	8	(Spain) Rubén Baraja (c)
RW	19	(Spain) Javier Arizmendi
AM	21	(Spain) David Silva
LW	16	(Spain) Juan Mata	(yellow card) 45'
FW	7	(Spain) David Villa		(substituted off) 75'
Substitutes:
GK	25	(Spain) Juan Mora
CB	12	(Portugal) Marco Caneira		(substituted on) 57'
MF	22	(Brazil) Edu		(substituted on) 66'
MF	11	(Argentina) Éver Banega
RW	17	(Spain) Joaquín
FW	9	(Spain) Fernando Morientes		(substituted on) 75'
FW	18	(Serbia) Nikola Žigić
Manager:
(Netherlands) Ronald Koeman
