= Pablo Hernández (footballer, born 1985) =

Spanish footballer (born 1985)

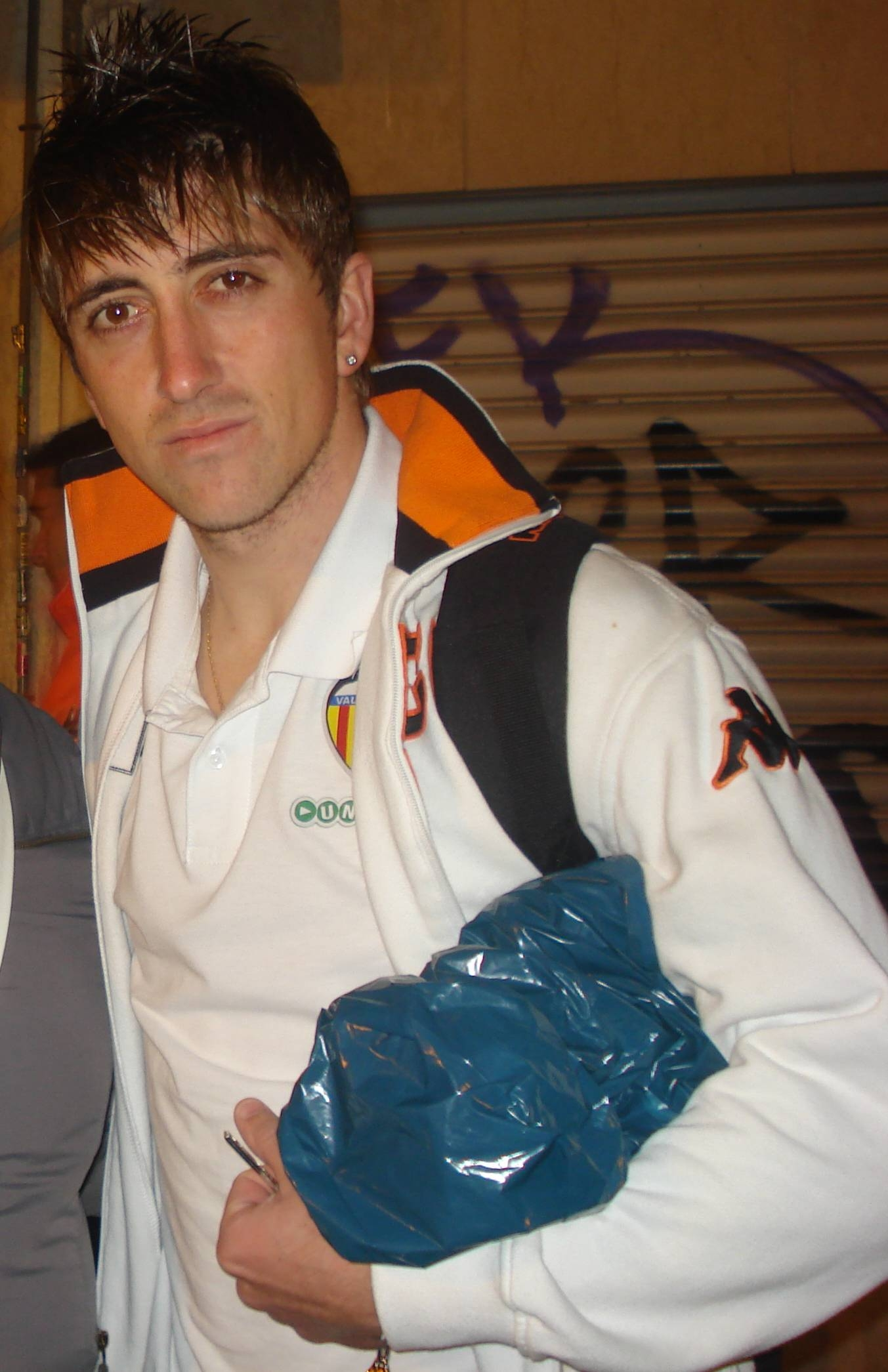
- Hernández in 2010

Personal information
- Full name: Pablo Hernández Domínguez
- Date of birth: 11 April 1985 (age 41)
- Place of birth: Castellón de la Plana, Spain
- Height: 1.73 m (5 ft 8 in)
- Positions: Attacking midfielder; winger

Team information
- Current team: Castellón (manager)

Youth career
- AVV Rafalafena
- 1997–2003: Castellón
- 2003–2004: Valencia

Senior career*
Years	Team	Apps	(Gls)
2004–2007	Valencia B	16	(4)
2004–2005	→ Onda (loan)	28	(5)
2006–2007	Valencia	1	(0)
2007	→ Cádiz (loan)	22	(4)
2007–2008	Getafe	28	(3)
2008–2012	Valencia	111	(16)
2012–2014	Swansea City	57	(5)
2014–2017	Al-Arabi	13	(6)
2015	→ Al-Nasr (loan)	12	(3)
2015–2016	→ Rayo Vallecano (loan)	27	(3)
2016–2017	→ Leeds United (loan)	15	(3)
2017–2021	Leeds United	152	(31)
2021–2023	Castellón	52	(6)
Total		534	(89)

International career
2009–2010	Spain	4	(1)

Managerial career
- 2024–2025: Castellón B
- 2025: Castellón (caretaker)
- 2025–: Castellón
- * Club domestic league appearances and goals

Pablo Hernández Domínguez (Spanish pronunciation: [ˈpaβlo eɾˈnandeθ]; born 11 April 1985) is a Spanish professional football manager and former player who played as an attacking midfielder or winger. He is the head coach of Segunda División club Castellón.

In a spell which also included two loans, he spent the early part of his career with Valencia, appearing in 158 official matches and scoring 25 goals. He also played in Wales for two years with Swansea City, and several seasons in England with Leeds United.

Hernández represented Spain at the 2009 Confederations Cup.

== Club career ==
=== Valencia ===
Born in Castellón de la Plana, Province of Castellón, Valencian Community, Hernández was a product of Valencia's youth system (operating as striker in the B team). He made his debut with the main squad on the last matchday of 2005–06, playing 20 minutes in a 2–1 away loss against Osasuna. Midway through the following season, he was loaned to Segunda División side Cádiz.

In July 2007, Valencia included Hernández in the transfer that brought Alexis from Getafe to the Mestalla Stadium, but would re-buy him for €1 million in July 2008. The player was subsequently signed to a six-year contract.

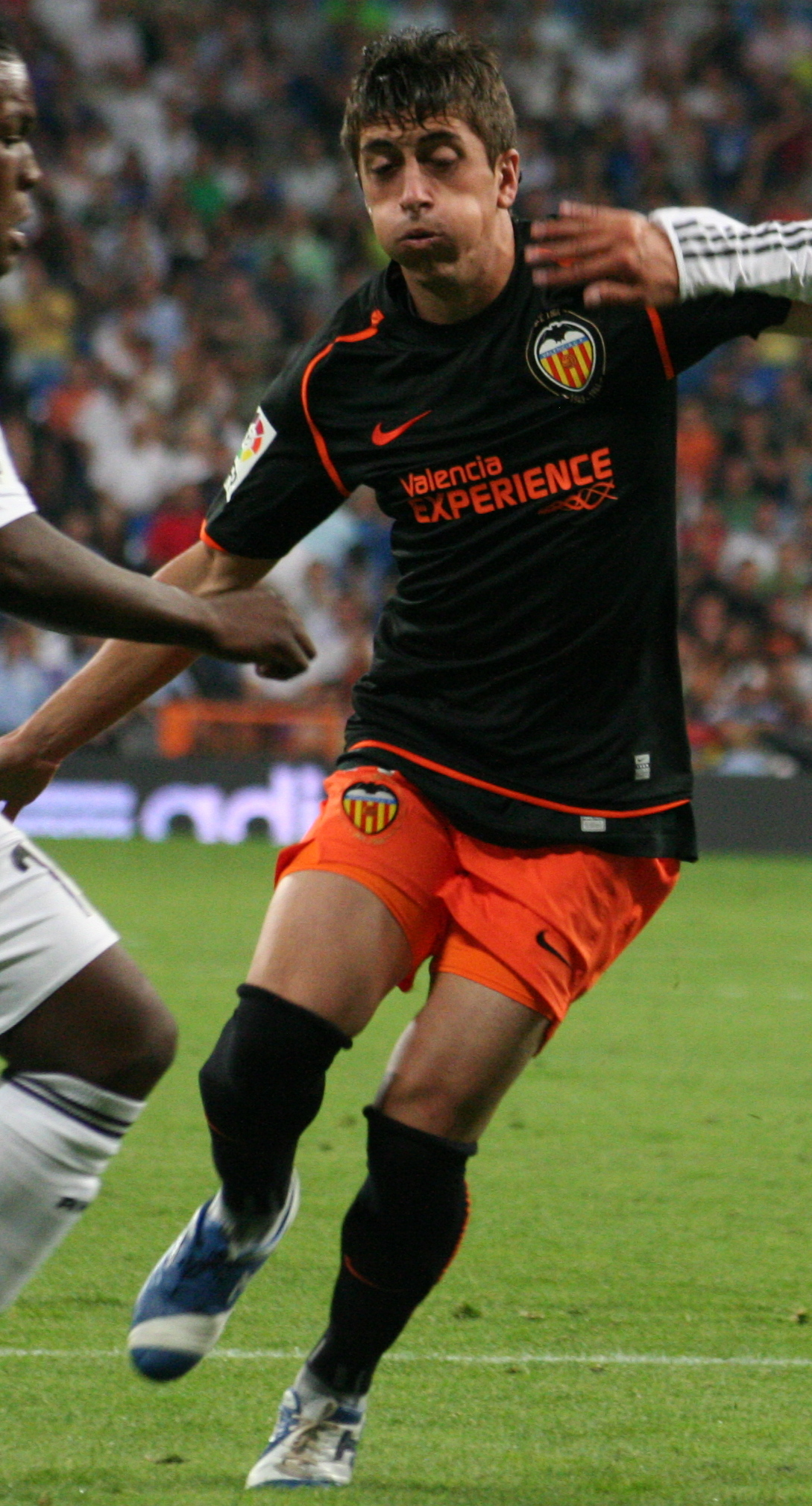
Hernández playing for Valencia in 2008

Hernández scored his first goal for Valencia on 27 November 2008, in a 4–0 win over Rosenborg in the group stage of the UEFA Cup, after an individual effort. After having subbed in for Rubén Baraja in the second half of a home fixture with Recreativo de Huelva, he netted his second and first in the league, in a 1–1 draw in March 2009. The following month, also as a replacement but now for Joaquín, he added his third, in a 3–1 home defeat of Sevilla – deep into injury time, against ten men.

On 25 April 2009, this time as a starter, Hernández fired the hosts into the 2–1 lead against Barcelona, following a run between four players and a one-two with Juan Mata; the match ended 2–2. He scored the second goal in 2009–10's opener, against Sevilla in a 2–0 home victory. Fully established in the starting XI now over Joaquín, he continued to produce fine displays during the campaign, including a 40-meter lob to help defeat Almería 3–0 away.

Hernández scored twice against Club Brugge in extra time of the UEFA Europa League round-of-32 second leg game played at the Mestalla on 25 February 2010, for a 3–0 win (3–1 on aggregate). In 2010–11, he continued battling with Joaquín for first-choice status. On 7 December 2010, he netted at Manchester United in the UEFA Champions League, putting his team 1–0 up at half-time in a 1–1 group stage draw.

=== Swansea City ===
On 31 August 2012, Hernández moved to Premier League side Swansea City for three years and a fee of £5.55 million. He scored his first official goal on 20 October, helping to a 2–1 home victory over Wigan Athletic.

Hernández scored his second goal for the Swans on 3 November 2012, a late equaliser in a 1–1 draw against Chelsea at the Liberty Stadium. He was named to the team of the week published on 3 September by Sky Sports, and started in the final of the Football League Cup on 24 February 2013, helping to a 5–0 rout of Bradford City.

=== Al-Arabi ===
On 15 July 2014, Hernández joined Al-Arabi on a three-year deal, having started talks with the Qatari club the previous week. The fee was unknown, but it was speculated that the fee would be lower than the amount paid by Swansea to Valencia for his services two years before.

Hernández returned to Spain and its top tier on 31 August 2015 after a loan spell at Al-Nasr, agreeing to a one-year loan deal with Rayo Vallecano. He started regularly for the team from the Madrid outskirts, who ended the campaign with relegation.

=== Leeds United ===
On 2 August 2016, Hernández signed with Championship club Leeds United on a six-month loan deal, with the option of a permanent move in January 2017, linking up with former Swansea manager Garry Monk and being given the number 19 shirt. After the former failed to receive his paperwork in time from the Qatar Football Association for the opening fixture against Queens Park Rangers (which ended in a 3–0 defeat), he made his debut on 10 August in a 3–2 win at Fleetwood Town in the EFL Cup.

Hernández's league debut for Leeds came in a 1–2 home loss to Birmingham City, on 13 August 2016. On 17 September he scored his first goal, with a curling effort in a 2–0 victory over Cardiff City. On 5 November, he picked up a hamstring injury late on in a 3–2 win against Norwich City at Carrow Road, returning to action after almost two months; he celebrated his return on 26 December with a goal after replacing Hadi Sacko, helping defeat hosts Preston North End 4–1.

Hernández signed a permanent six-month contract on 9 January 2017, with the option to extend the link by 12 months at the end of the season. He appeared in his first match after the new agreement four days later, helping the side climb to third in the table after beating Derby County 1–0 at home and being named Player of the match in the process.

On 17 May 2017, the 32-year-old Hernández agreed to a new one-year deal. On 16 April 2018, he was nominated as one of four players for the Leeds Player of The Year award. Ten days later, he ended speculation about his future (with his contract close to expiry) by signing a new two-year extension until June 2020, and on 5 May, he won both its Player of the Year and Players Player Of The Year awards at the annual ceremony.

On 25 August 2018, after Hernández had scored his third goal in five league games, manager Marcelo Bielsa hailed him as "a complete player from every point of view", adding that he had only rarely in his career seen a wide player exert such influence over the whole pitch. On 5 September, he won the Professional Footballers' Association Championship Player Of The Month award for August.

After helping Leeds to a third-place finish in the 2018–19 campaign, Hernández was voted into the PFA Team of the Year on 24 April. Four days later, he again won his team's Player of the Year and Players Player Of The Year awards.

On 19 November 2019, Hernández put pen to paper to an extension until 2022. His two crucial match-winning goals at home in early 2020 against Millwall and Reading were key to maintaining sustained pressure on West Bromwich Albion at the top of the table. He finished with nine for the eventual champions by the end of the season, in a return to the Premier League after 16 years.

On 21 May 2021, the club announced that Hernández would leave on 30 June alongside Gaetano Berardi.

=== Castellón ===
Hernández returned to Spain after five years on 20 July 2021, joining hometown club Castellón who had been recently relegated to the newly created Primera División RFEF; a three-year contract was signed.

In July 2023, Hernández retired aged 38.

== International career ==
After close observation by Spain national team manager Luis Aragonés during his time at Getafe, Hernández was picked for the 32-man provisional squad for UEFA Euro 2008, but did not make the final cut. On 5 June 2009, he was called to represent the country at the 2009 FIFA Confederations Cup in South Africa as a replacement for injured Andrés Iniesta, by new boss Vicente del Bosque. He earned his first cap on the 20th, coming on as a substitute for club teammate David Villa in the 60th minute of the last group stage match, a 2–0 defeat of the hosts.

Hernández scored his only international goal on 18 November 2009, playing the entire second half of the 5–1 friendly win in Austria and closing the scoresheet.

== Playing style ==
In 2016, the Yorkshire Evening Post described Hernández as the "most creative player in the Championship," due largely to his runs behind the defence, skill at picking out dangerous passes in open play and aptitude at taking corners and other free kicks.

== Coaching career ==
On 5 June 2024, after one year acting as an ambassador of Castellón, Hernández was appointed head coach of the reserves in the Tercera Federación. In his first season in charge, he led the side to a first-ever promotion to Segunda Federación.

Hernández was named caretaker manager of the first team on 16 September 2025, replacing the sacked Johan Plat. On his debut as a professional four days later, he oversaw a 3–1 away win over Cultural y Deportiva Leonesa, their first of the campaign. On 12 November, he was confirmed in the position until June 2026.

On 17 June 2026, after taking Castellón to the promotion play-offs, Hernández renewed his contract until 2029.

== Club ownership ==
In June 2017, Hernández became co-owner of Spanish club Castellón (alongside former Valencia teammate Ángel Dealbert and others), where he had started playing 20 years ago. Under his first season of ownership, it won promotion from Tercera División; they both left due to disagreements regarding the team in April 2019, but kept their position as shareholders.

== Personal life ==
Hernández' wife, Mar García, is the sister of professional golfer Sergio García, who competes on both the PGA Tour and the PGA European Tour.

He has two sons, Eric and Luca. He is often seen kissing his arms after scoring a goal, where he has tattoos of The Virgin Mary and his sons’ names.

== Career statistics ==
=== Club ===
Appearances and goals by club, season and competition
Club	Season	League			National cup (Note: Includes Copa del Rey, FA Cup)		League cup (Note: Includes Football League Cup, UAE League Cup)		Continental		Other		Total	
Club	Season	Division	Apps	Goals	Apps	Goals	Apps	Goals	Apps	Goals	Apps	Goals	Apps	Goals
Valencia	2005–06	La Liga	1	0	0	0	—		0	0	—		1	0
Valencia B	2006–07	Segunda División B	16	4	—		—		—		—		16	4
Cádiz (loan)	2006–07	Segunda División	22	4	0	0	—		—		—		22	4
Getafe	2007–08	La Liga	28	3	6	1	—		9 (Note: Appearances in UEFA Cup)	4	—		43	8
Valencia	2008–09	La Liga	21	3	4	1	—		6	1	—		31	5
Valencia	2009–10	La Liga	33	5	0	0	—		11 (Note: Appearances in UEFA Europa League)	3	—		44	8
Valencia	2010–11	La Liga	27	5	2	0	—		6 (Note: Appearances in UEFA Champions League)	2	—		35	7
Valencia	2011–12	La Liga	30	3	5	0	—		10	2	—		45	5
Valencia	Total		111	16	11	1	—		33	8	—		155	25
Swansea City	2012–13	Premier League	30	3	4	0	2	0	—		—		36	3
Swansea City	2013–14	Premier League	27	2	2	0	0	0	6	0	—		35	2
Swansea City	Total		57	5	6	0	2	0	6	0	—		71	5
Al-Arabi	2014–15	Qatar Stars League	13	6					—		—		13	6
Al-Nasr (loan)	2014–15	UAE Pro League	12	3			1	0	—		—		13	3
Rayo Vallecano (loan)	2015–16	La Liga	27	3	3	0	—		—		—		30	3
Leeds United	2016–17	Championship	35	6	0	0	3	0	—		—		38	6
Leeds United	2017–18	Championship	41	7	0	0	2	2	—		—		43	9
Leeds United	2018–19	Championship	39	12	0	0	0	0	—		2 (Note: Appearances in Championship play-offs)	0	41	12
Leeds United	2019–20	Championship	36	9	0	0	0	0	—		—		36	9
Leeds United	2020–21	Premier League	16	0	1	0	0	0	—		—		17	0
Leeds United	Total		167	34	1	0	5	2	—		2	0	175	36
Castellón	2021–22	Primera División RFEF	26	3	1	0	—		—		—		27	3
Castellón	2022–23	Primera Federación	26	3	0	0	—		—		4 (Note: Appearances in Primera Federación promotion play-offs)	0	30	3
Castellón	Total		52	6	1	0	—		—		4	0	57	6
Career total			506	84	28	2	8	2	48	12	6	0	596	100

=== International ===
Appearances and goals by national team and year
National team	Year	Apps	Goals
Spain	2009	2	1
Spain	2010	2	0
Total		4	1

Scores and results list Spain's goal tally first.

No.	Date	Venue	Opponent	Score	Result	Competition
1	18 November 2009	Ernst-Happel-Stadion, Vienna	Austria	5–1	5–1	Friendly

== Managerial statistics ==
As of match played 21 November 2026

Managerial record by team and tenure
Team	Nat	From	To	Record								Ref
Team	Nat	From	To	G	W	D	L	GF	GA	GD	Win %	Ref
Castellón B	(Spain)	5 June 2024	16 September 2025	36	19	4	13	79	62	+17	52.78	
Castellón	(Spain)	16 September 2025	Present	55	31	14	10	96	51	+45	56.36	
Career total				91	50	18	23	175	113	+62	54.95	—

== Honours ==
Getafe

- Copa del Rey runner-up: 2007–08

Swansea City

- Football League Cup: 2012–13

Al-Nasr

- UAE President's Cup: 2014–15
- UAE League Cup: 2014–15

Leeds United

- EFL Championship: 2019–20

Spain

- FIFA Confederations Cup third place: 2009

Individual

- Leeds United Player of the Year/Players Player of the Year: 2017–18, 2018–19, 2019–20
- Professional Footballers' Association Championship Player of the Month: August 2018
- PFA Team of the Year: 2018–19 Championship
