= David Silva =

Spanish footballer (born 1986)

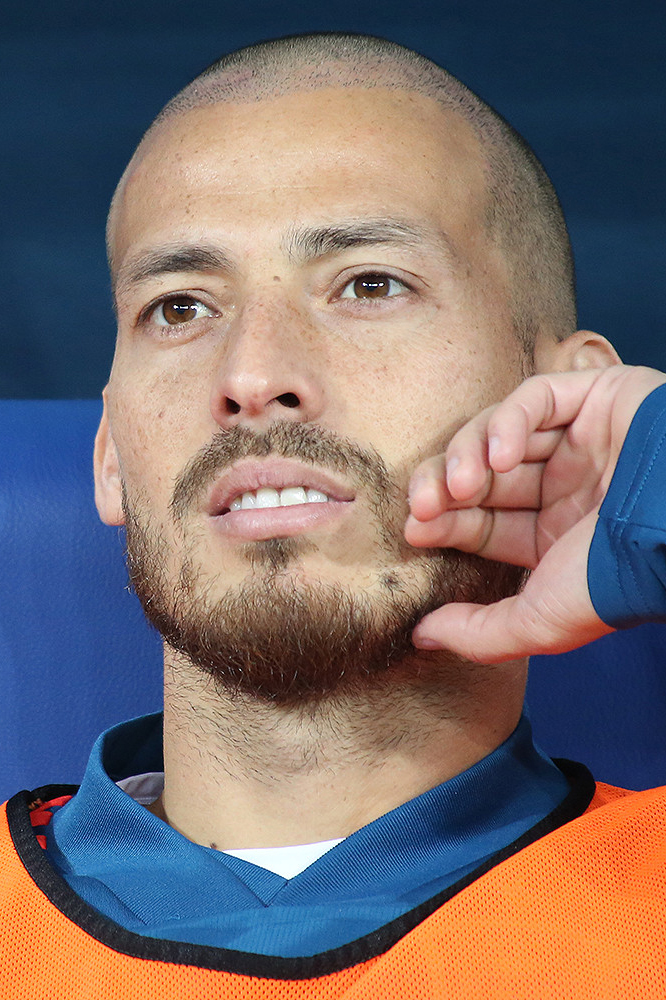
- Silva with Spain in 2017

Personal information
- Full name: David Josué Jiménez Silva
- Date of birth: 8 January 1986 (age 40)
- Place of birth: Arguineguín, Gran Canaria, Spain
- Height: 1.70 m (5 ft 7 in)
- Position: Midfielder

Youth career
- 1995–2000: San Fernando
- 2000–2003: Valencia

Senior career*
Years	Team	Apps	(Gls)
2003–2004	Valencia B	14	(1)
2004–2010	Valencia	119	(21)
2004–2005	→ Eibar (loan)	35	(4)
2005–2006	→ Celta (loan)	34	(4)
2010–2020	Manchester City	309	(60)
2020–2023	Real Sociedad	74	(6)
2026	Sha Tin	1	(1)

International career
2001–2002	Spain U16	6	(2)
2002–2003	Spain U17	20	(5)
2004–2005	Spain U19	14	(5)
2005	Spain U20	5	(4)
2004–2006	Spain U21	9	(7)
2006–2018	Spain	125	(35)
Medal record
Men's football
Representing Spain
FIFA World Cup
Winner	2010
UEFA European Championship
Winner	2008
Winner	2012
FIFA Confederations Cup
Third place	2009
Runner-up	2013
FIFA U-17 World Cup
Runner-up	2003
UEFA European Under-17 Championship
Runner-up	2003
UEFA U-19 European Championship
Winner	2004
Signature
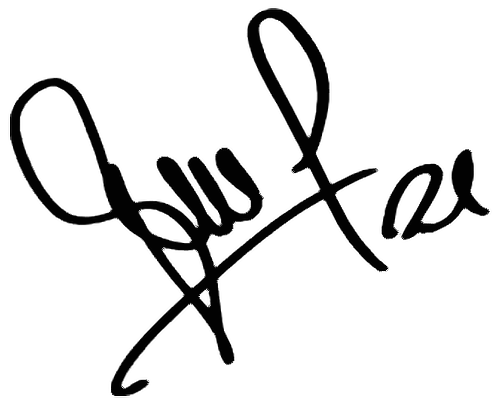
- * Club domestic league appearances and goals

David Josué Jiménez Silva (born 8 January 1986) is a Spanish former professional footballer who played as a central or an attacking midfielder. Widely regarded as one of the best players of his generation and among the greatest players in Premier League history, he is known for his balance, ball control and agility in close spaces, combined with his skill, composure, passing and flair on the ball.

Silva spent seven years of his professional career with Valencia, playing from 2004 to 2010, and won the Copa del Rey in 2008. In the summer of 2010, he moved to Manchester City and appeared in over 400 matches for the club, winning four Premier League titles, two FA Cups and five League Cups. Silva was also named in the PFA Team of the Year three times and is the quickest player to reach 200 wins in the Premier League. He left Manchester City in 2020 after a ten-year tenure and returned to La Liga with Real Sociedad, where he won his second Copa del Rey in 2020. Later on, he sustained an anterior cruciate ligament injury during preseason training with Real Sociedad, which forced him to retire in July 2023. Silva returned to football from retirement in October 2026, featuring one game for Sha Tin.

Silva represented Spain, from his debut for the senior team in 2006 until his international retirement in 2018. He formed a midfield partnership with the likes of Xavi, Andrés Iniesta, Sergio Busquets, Xabi Alonso and Cesc Fàbregas which led to three consecutive international tournament victories – UEFA Euro 2008, 2010 FIFA World Cup, and UEFA Euro 2012. One of 13 Spanish players to have amassed 100 caps, Silva scored 35 goals for Spain, making him the 5th highest goalscorer in their history, and also provided 29 assists, making him the second-highest assist provider in their history.

== Early life ==
David Josué Jiménez Silva was born on 8 January 1986 in Arguineguín, Gran Canaria, Canary Islands, to Fernando Jiménez, a former municipal police officer who eventually was responsible for the safety of the Valencia stadium and Eva Silva. His father, Fernando, is Spanish (Canarian) while his mother, Eva, is of Japanese heritage, claimed by the Canarian media.

Silva began playing football in the youth team of San Fernando, near Maspalomas. Originally, he played as a goalkeeper, before becoming a winger and mirrored his game around his footballing idol as a youth, Michael Laudrup. When he was 14, he received an offer to become a youth player at Valencia, which he accepted. He stayed in Valencia's youth set-up until he was 17.

== Club career ==
=== Valencia ===
A product of Valencia's youth system, Silva made his professional debut in the 2004–05 season, with Segunda División's Eibar, while on loan from Valencia, playing 35 league games and scoring on five occasions. In the following season, he was again out on loan, this time to Celta Vigo, where he played 34 matches, scoring four goals. After two late substitute appearances, the first in a 2–0 home win over Málaga on 28 August 2005, Silva finished as an undisputed starter as the Galician side reached the UEFA Cup straight from the second-tier.

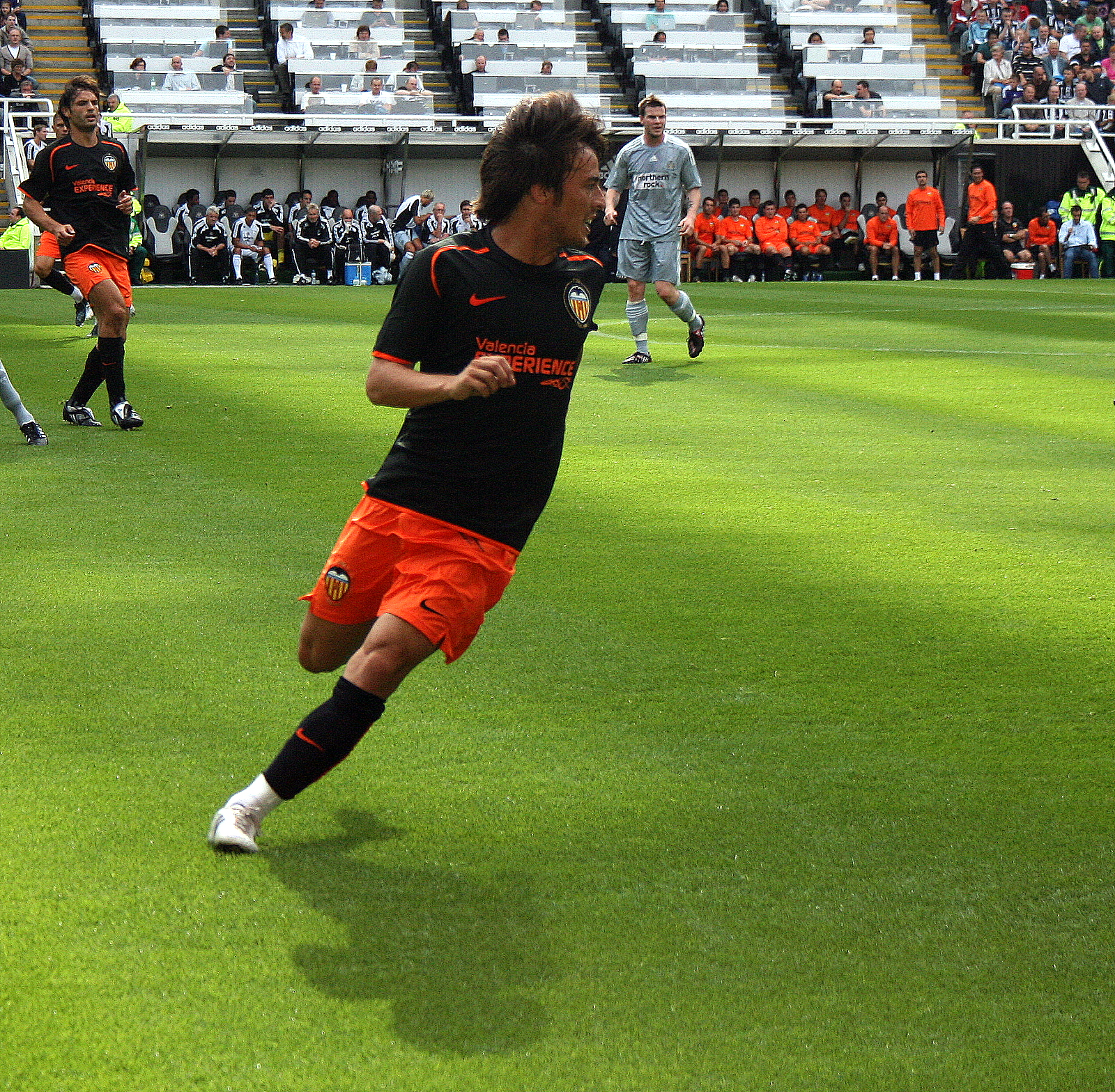
Silva playing for Valencia in 2008

Silva returned to Valencia in the summer of 2006, becoming an automatic first-choice despite his young age of 20. In two seasons combined, he only missed six matches and netted 14 goals, his first league goal coming on 5 November 2006 in a 1–1 draw at Espanyol. On 13 August 2008, he extended his contract by five years, amidst interest of several Premier League clubs including Liverpool and Manchester United. He won the Copa del Rey in 2008, his first title in Spain.

After not appearing in the first three months of the 2008–09 season due to a chronic ankle ailment, Silva returned to the squad in mid-December 2008. On 3 January 2009, he scored twice in a 3–1 home win over Atlético Madrid, still contributing with 19 matches (four goals) as the Che qualified for the UEFA Europa League.

In the 2009–10 season, Silva scored a career-best eight goals, as Valencia finished in third position and returned to the UEFA Champions League. On 15 April 2010, he scored a brace against Athletic Bilbao in a 2–0 home win, adding three assists in a 4–4 draw at Werder Bremen in the Round of 16 of the UEFA Europa League.

=== Manchester City ===
==== 2010–11: Debut season, ending the trophy drought ====
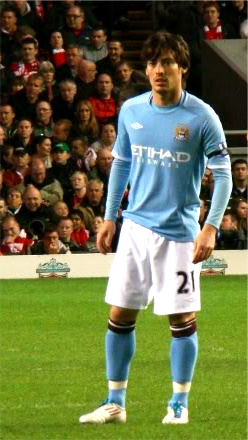
Silva playing for Manchester City in 2011

On 30 June 2010, Manchester City announced that they had reached an agreement with Valencia over the transfer of Silva and that he would join the club on a four-year deal, prior to the start of the 2010–11 season. On 14 July, the Premier League side completed the signing and Silva was awarded the number 21 shirt, the same number he wore for Valencia and for the Spanish national team. Silva has said that he was happy at Valencia, but that the club had no choice but to sell him due to their large debts at the time. Manchester City had previously tried to sign Silva and his Valencia teammate David Villa in 2008, but were put off when Valencia quoted a £135 million combined price tag on both players.

City manager Roberto Mancini mainly deployed Silva as a winger and later in a trequartista role in his first season. Silva made his Premier League debut on 14 August 2010 in a 0–0 draw against Tottenham Hotspur at White Hart Lane. He scored his first goal for the club on 16 September, eight minutes into the Europa League group match against Red Bull Salzburg. On 17 October, he scored his first league goal in a match against Blackpool, netting City's third goal in a 3–2 away win. He received three consecutive Manchester City Player of the Month awards from October to December 2010.

Following his debut season in the Premier League, Silva emerged as one of the league's finest playmakers. Carlos Tevez lauded him as "the best signing we [Manchester City] have made." Silva finished the 2010–11 campaign with four goals and seven assists in 35 league appearances.

==== 2011–12: Premier League win, assist leader ====
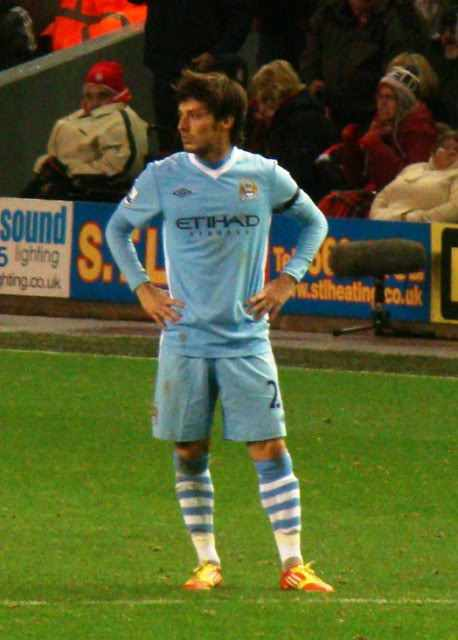
Silva with Manchester City in 2011

Silva began the 2011–12 season in fine form, scoring the third goal in City's 4–0 thrashing of Swansea City and was voted man of the match. He also scored the following week against Bolton Wanderers, and was again named man of the match. Silva then set up two of Sergio Agüero's three goals in City's second home game against Wigan Athletic. He was beginning to form a great understanding with the Argentine, with the pair having combined to score three goals already. After a series of magnificent displays from Silva, City manager Roberto Mancini compared him to fellow Spanish internationals Xavi and Andrés Iniesta and said that Silva is "one of the best players in the world." On 1 October, Silva was awarded the Premier League Player of the Month for his outstanding performances, making it the first time ever that two Manchester City players have won the award in back-to-back months with Edin Džeko winning it the month before.

In the first Manchester derby of the season at Old Trafford, Manchester City won 6–1, with Silva proving, yet again, to be instrumental in the Manchester City attack, scoring the fifth goal, setting up Edin Džeko's second with a chested volley pass through the United defense, and participating in the first two goals with excellent passing to James Milner to assist Mario Balotelli. He was described as having been "two steps ahead of all the United players" in the aftermath of the match. On 25 October 2011, in an interview with a Spanish radio station, Silva revealed that he turned down Barcelona and Real Madrid so he could sign for City, and that he wants to stay at the club for years. He commented, "Madrid and Barcelona are great teams, but I'm happy here and I would like to stay here for many years." Former City and England defender Earl Barrett said he is almost impossible to stop due to his ability to create space and Andy Cole, who mostly played for Manchester United, has stated that Silva "is a joy to watch."

Having done well to cut the gap between them and Manchester United to just three points, City went into April's Manchester derby knowing that a win would be enough to send them top of the Premier League on goal difference. In a match widely billed as the biggest game in Premier League history, Silva delivered a corner which was headed home by Vincent Kompany for the winner. City triumphed 1–0, and returned to the league summit having been eight points behind their city rivals as recently as the start of that month.

On 13 May 2012, with City heading into the final day of the season needing a win over QPR to secure their first top flight title in 44 years, Silva delivered a cross for Edin Džeko to score the equaliser in the 91st minute of the match. In addition to winning his first Premier League medal with Manchester City, he also finished the season on top of the assists table with 15 assists to his name and was one of four City players who made it in the PFA's Premier League Team of the Year.

==== 2012–13: Premier League, FA Cup runner-up ====
"He is the maestro, he knows where the passes are going to go. He runs the game. A joy to watch."

— Jamie Redknapp

On 17 September 2012, Silva signed a new five-year deal at City, committing himself to the Etihad Stadium until 2017. Just six days after signing his new contract, Silva got off the mark in the 2012–13 Premier League season, registering an assist for Joleon Lescott in a 1–1 draw with Arsenal. He followed this up with another assist the following week, as he played in Aguero to score against Fulham at Craven Cottage. He injured himself playing for Spain in October, which meant he had to miss three games for Manchester City. On 11 November, he provided the crucial assist, a lofted through-ball, to striker Edin Džeko, who converted in the 88th minute to steal a 2–1 victory over Tottenham Hotspur. His first league goal of the season came in a 5–0 thrashing of Aston Villa at home in the very next league match, on 17 November.

On 19 January 2013, Silva scored twice against Fulham at home in a 2–0 win. On 9 March, he scored the fifth and final goal in Manchester City's 5–0 win against Barnsley at the City of Manchester Stadium in the quarter-finals of the FA Cup, sealing progression to the semi-finals. Despite missing the clash with Chelsea through injury, City prevailed 2–1 through goals from Aguero and Samir Nasri, leading them to their second FA Cup final in three seasons. They would face relegation-threatened Wigan Athletic at Wembley. Silva started the match and played the full 90 minutes, but the Blues were rocked by a Pablo Zabaleta red card, with a late Ben Watson header compounding their misery. It was one of the great FA Cup upsets, and ended up costing City boss Mancini his job.

In the penultimate Premier League game against Reading, Silva made a superb pass to Džeko which took the entire Reading defense out of the game. Džeko scored, sealing a 0–2 win in City's first match since the sacking of Roberto Mancini. Silva finished the season with four goals and ten assists in 32 league appearances for a City squad that finished runners-up to city rivals Manchester United for the Premier League title.

==== 2013–14: Premier League and League Cup double ====
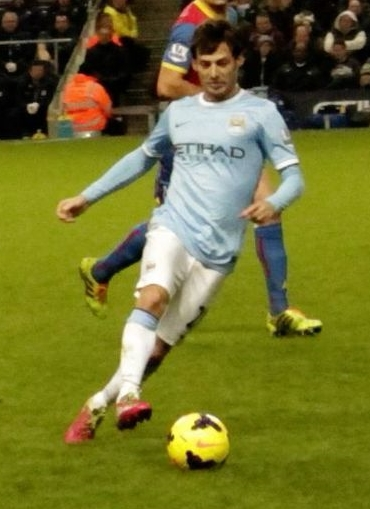
Silva playing for Manchester City in 2013

The 2013–14 season was a tough one for Silva, as numerous injuries limited him to just 27 league appearances. Nonetheless, he did well to maintain his stellar record of goals and assists for Manchester City. On 19 August 2013, Silva scored Manchester City's opening goal of the campaign in a 4–0 win against Newcastle United at the City of Manchester Stadium. He followed this up with an assist in the 3–2 defeat at Cardiff City, crossing for Álvaro Negredo to score. On 5 October, Silva began one of his most productive spells in the Premier League. Making his first league start since August following a number of injury setbacks, he assisted Sergio Aguero to score against Everton, before scoring once and setting up another in a 3–1 victory over West Ham United. Silva then scored again in the 7–0 home win over Norwich on 2 November, but his good form was curtailed by a calf injury, which ruled him out of City's next six games.

He made his return on 14 December 2013, scoring at home in a 6–3 win over Arsenal, before setting up goals in each of the next two games against Fulham and Liverpool. Silva was also enjoying one of his most productive UEFA Champions League campaigns to date, having managed three assists and a goal in Group D, including a strike in a 3–2 win over champions Bayern Munich in December.

City had also progressed deep into the League Cup, eliminating Leicester City and Newcastle United to reach the semi-final, where they would face West Ham United. Silva played 73 minutes of the first–leg, which City won by a large 6–0 scoreline, meaning he was rested for the return leg (a routine 3–0 win). He was restored to the starting lineup in the final, where goals from Yaya Touré, Nasri and substitute Jesús Navas earned City their first League Cup triumph since 1976.

The month of March was a productive one for Silva, as he registered two goals and two assists in the league, along with a slew of excellent performances. He was named Manchester City's Player of the Month for March 2014, after scoring in away matches against Hull City and Arsenal. Silva followed this up with a goal and assist against Liverpool at Anfield, but could not prevent the Blues slipping to a 3–2 defeat. However, following a strong run of form in the final five games of the season, City pipped the Merseysiders to the title, and Silva claimed his second Premier League winners medal to add to the one from 2011–12. He ended the campaign with eight goals and 16 assists in all competitions.

==== 2014–15: Contract extension, Premier League runner-up ====
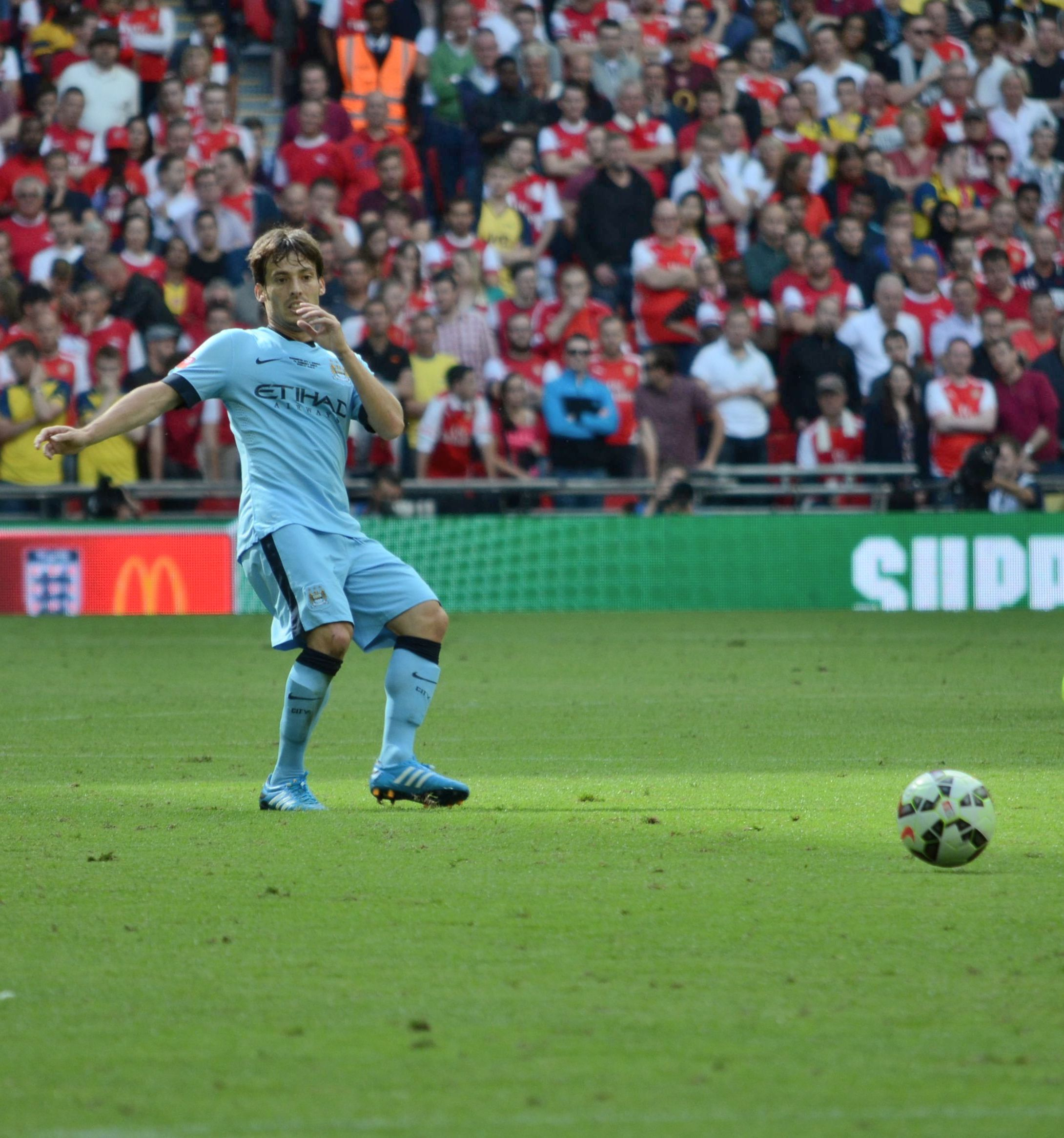
Silva playing for Manchester City in 2014

On 10 August 2014, Silva played in the 2014 FA Community Shield, a match City lost 3–0 to Arsenal. Two days later, he signed a five-year contract extension with City. Like the previous season, on 17 August, Silva scored Manchester City's opening goal of the 2014–15 Premier League season in a 2–0 away win against Newcastle United. Silva then scored against West Brom on Boxing Day.

On 21 February 2015, Silva scored a brace against Newcastle United in a 5–0 win. He won the Etihad Player of the Month award for his performances in February. On 4 March, Silva scored in 1–0 win against Leicester City to take him to ten league goals in a season for the first time in his career. Jamie Redknapp described him as a "maestro" for his performances for City, while his teammate Edin Džeko called him "the best player in the Premier League."

Three days later, City took on Barcelona at the Etihad Stadium in the first—leg of their UEFA Champions League Round of 16 clash. The Blues were largely blown away by Barcelona's immense quality, but the game was marked by an ingenious backheel flick from Silva to Aguero, who scored to pull one back for City.

On 19 April 2015, in a 2–0 victory over West Ham, Silva was caught in the face by the elbow of Cheikhou Kouyaté, requiring eight minutes of treatment before being substituted for Samir Nasri. Tests confirmed that he had not fractured his cheekbone.

On 10 May, Silva scored a goal in City's 6–0 win over Queens Park Rangers, which resulted in the latter's relegation. He ended the campaign with 12 goals and 10 assists in all competitions, with all 12 strikes coming in the Premier League- a career high.

==== 2015–16: UEFA Champions League semi-final ====
In the opening match of the Premier League season, in a 0–3 win at West Bromwich Albion, Silva delivered a performance his manager Manuel Pellegrini labelled "unbelievable". As well as assisting the team's third goal, a clever backheel flick on Yaya Touré's long range drive sent the ball spinning into the net. After providing another three assists for the team in August (in wins against Chelsea and Watford), Silva was nominated for both of the Manchester City and Premier League Player of the Month Awards for August, winning the former.

Silva was injured for most of October and November after picking up an ankle injury, while playing for Spain on 9 October. He made his return, as a 75th-minute substitute, in a 3–1 league defeat of Southampton on 28 November. He netted the opener in the last UEFA Champions League group stage match on 8 December, in a 4–2 home defeat of Borussia Mönchengladbach, which resulted in Manchester City topping their group for the first time. Silva provided another three assists in home victories against Tyne-Wear rivals Newcastle United and Sunderland.

On 16 January 2016, in a 4–0 home league win against Crystal Palace, Silva scored one, set-up another two goals and played a key—pass in the remaining goal. Having started every match of City's League Cup campaign since the quarter-final stage, he started the 2016 Football League Cup final on 28 February 2016, playing 110 minutes against Liverpool as the match went to extra—time. He was replaced 10 minutes from time by Wilfried Bony, and Manchester City went on to defeat the Reds 3–1 on penalties, with Silva winning his second League Cup with the club. He claimed another brace of assists in a 4–0 home defeat of Aston Villa six days later.

On 24 February, Silva scored City's second as they beat Dynamo Kyiv 3–1 in the first leg of their Champions League Round of 16 tie, his second strike of the European campaign. He proceeded to start City's next four games in the competition, as the Blues made their deepest run in history, reaching the semi-finals. However, having started as one of City's brightest players in the semi-final first leg against Real Madrid, Silva was forced off after just 40 minutes due to injury. This caused him to miss the second—leg at the Santiago Bernabeu, and his team suffered in his absence- the Blues were beaten 1–0 on the night and on aggregate. Pellegrini lamented the loss of his main playmaker, asserting that the absence of Silva had crippled his side and hamstrung their ability to create chances.

Silva ended the campaign with four goals and 12 assists in 36 matches, a disappointing campaign for him personally, and one in which he missed 22 matches due to a persistent ankle injury, amongst other issues. Nonetheless, it was a trophy-winning season, the ninth major honour of his career.

==== 2016–17: Manchester City Player of the Year ====
With Pep Guardiola arriving as Manchester City's new manager to much fanfare, it was the beginning of a new era for City. Having put pen to paper on a three-year contract with the Blues, the legendary manager stated that one of the reasons he had come to the club was to work with Silva, whom he described as a special player, and one of the best he had ever trained. In Guardiola's first season at the club, Silva scored one goal in a 5–0 win over Steaua București in the 2016–17 UEFA Champions League play-off round. He enjoyed a relatively productive European campaign that season- having provided an assist for Raheem Sterling against Celtic, he later scored the equalising goal in a 1–1 draw against Borussia Mönchengladbach in the group stage. The Blues progressed to the knockout stages where they would face Monaco in the Round of 16, but despite another pinpoint Silva cross to assist Agüero, City crashed out of the tournament on away goals following a 6–6 aggregate draw.

In the league, despite a bright opening to the campaign when City stormed to the top of the table, it proved a difficult season for the Blues, as they eventually fell away and ended up finishing third, 15 points behind champions Chelsea. It was a season in transition for the club, who under Guardiola were beginning to implement a distinct footballing philosophy.

Despite the team's under-performance, Silva ended the campaign with eight goals and 11 assists in all competitions, and he beat off competition from Sergio Agüero and Kevin De Bruyne to be named Manchester City's Player of the Season. It was his second time being recognised as such, following his winning of the award in 2011–12, with the Spaniard fast becoming one of Pep Guardiola's favourites in the City side.

==== 2017–18: Third Premier League and League Cup win ====
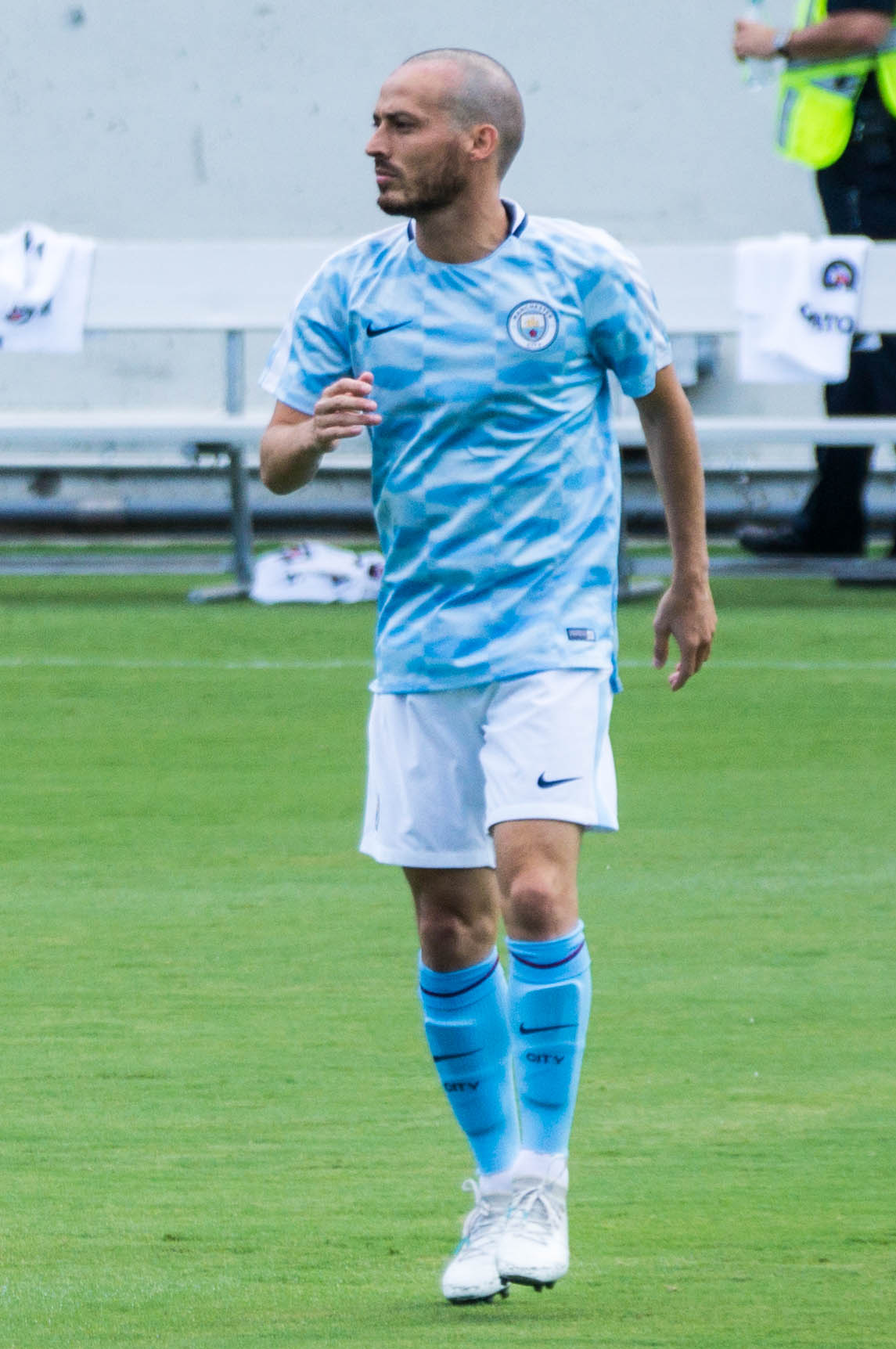
Silva playing for Manchester City in 2017

Silva started the 2017–18 season with yet another display of finesse, providing eight Premier League assists in 14 appearances, which was the highest total for any player in Europe's top five leagues. The 2017–18 season was an especially difficult time for the Spaniard, with his newborn son having been born extremely prematurely. This led to him having to jet back and forth between England and Spain to visit his son and partner in a hospital in Madrid. Despite this, Silva continued to produce excellent performances, and on 30 November 2017, he signed a one-year contract extension with Manchester City keeping him at the club until 2020. On 10 December, Silva scored the winner in a closely fought Manchester derby at Old Trafford, stabbing the ball past David de Gea from close range.

Silva was forced to miss a crucial game against Tottenham Hotspur at the Etihad Stadium in December, as he was with his son in Spain. In his absence, City delivered a sumptuous performance, smashing Tottenham 4–1 following an urging from manager Pep Guardiola to secure the win for Silva and his partner Yessica. Midfielder Kevin De Bruyne held his fingers up to show the number 21, Silva's shirt number, after scoring City's second, in a touching tribute to the Spaniard. Manchester City ended up winning the Premier League with a record 100 point tally, leading to the team being nicknamed The Centurions. The 19 point gap to second-placed Manchester United was also a record winning margin, which stands to this day.

Silva also scored in the 2018 EFL Cup final against Arsenal. For his contributions, Silva was nominated for the PFA Player of the Year and named in the PFA Team of the Year for the second time as City won the Premier League. It was the third Premier League title of Silva's career and his second time being named in the PFA Team of the Year, and he finished the season with 10 goals and 14 assists across all competitions.

==== 2018–19: Four titles in one season ====
On 15 September 2018, in a 3–0 home win over Fulham, Silva scored his 50th Premier League goal in his 253rd appearance in the competition, also making his 350th appearance for Manchester City in the same match. City and Liverpool went head to head in an absorbing title race, which ended up with City pipping the Reds to the title by a single point.

It was a remarkable season for the Blues, as they went on to win the FA Community Shield, League Cup and FA Cup too, with Silva scoring in the final of the latter tournament. In doing this, they became the first club in English football history to win all four domestic honours in a single season. Silva played in 33 of City's 38 league games, registering 10 goals and 14 assists in all competitions as he picked up his second FA Cup, fourth League Cup and fourth Premier League title.

==== 2019–20: Fifth League Cup win, departure, statue ====
Following the departure of Vincent Kompany in 2019, Silva inherited the club captaincy. On 26 June 2019, Silva announced that he would leave Manchester City at the end of the 2019–20 season. The campaign began with City facing Liverpool in the Community Shield at Wembley- City won on penalties following a 1–1 draw, with Silva producing a brilliant pass to assist Raheem Sterling for City's goal. On 8 July, he provided two assists, the second of which was his 10th of the season, and scored a free kick as City beat Newcastle United 5–0. With the free—kick goal, he reached 150 Premier League goals and assists, which only a few midfielders had done before.

On 1 March 2020, City took on Aston Villa in the EFL Cup final, their third such final in as many years and fifth in seven seasons. The Blues won 2–1, with goals from Sergio Agüero and Rodri, and lifted the trophy for the third time in a row. It was Silva's only trophy as captain of Manchester City, and his fifth League Cup title overall, making him the most decorated player in the competition's 60-year history.

On 26 July 2020, Silva played his final Premier League game for Manchester City, a 5–0 win over Norwich City. He was substituted late on in the match, to applause from all present. Just under a month later, he played his last game in a City shirt, in a disappointing 3–1 defeat to Lyon in the quarter-finals of the UEFA Champions League, coming on as a late substitute. At the age of 34, Silva ended the campaign with a respectable return of six goals and 11 assists in all competitions, enough to earn himself a third appearance in the PFA Team of the Year despite City's underwhelming season.

On 17 August 2020, Manchester City chairman Khaldoon Al Mubarak announced plans for a statue of Silva, along with teammates Sergio Agüero and Vincent Kompany, to be installed at the Etihad Stadium to commemorate his 10-year "transformational" contribution at City. The statues of Silva and Kompany were unveiled on 28 August 2021.

=== Real Sociedad ===
On 17 August 2020, La Liga club Real Sociedad announced the signing of Silva on a free transfer, despite reports of a move to Serie A side Lazio.

Silva made his debut for the club on 20 September 2020, in a 0–0 home draw against Real Madrid, coming on as a substitute for Alexander Isak in the second-half. On 25 October 2020, Silva provided two assists as La Real beat Huesca 4–1 in La Liga. A week later, he scored his first goal for the club, in a 4–1 away win against Celta Vigo. Following his excellent performances for Sociedad, Silva was named in WhoScored's La Liga Team of the Month for November, as well as being named Real Sociedad Player of the Month.

On 21 February 2021, Silva once again provided two assists as Real Sociedad defeated Alaves 4–0 in the league. This propelled La Real to 5th in the table, while Silva became the only player to provide two assists in two different La Liga games that season.

On 3 April 2021, Silva started in and played 85 minutes of the 2020 Copa del Rey final against local rivals Athletic Bilbao. The match was settled by a 63rd-minute penalty from La Real captain Mikel Oyarzabal, after Cristian Portu had been brought down in the box. Silva was substituted late in the game to a standing ovation from the Sociedad bench, and along with his teammates went on to lift the Copa del Rey, Real Sociedad's first major trophy since 1987. It was the 16th major honour of Silva's career, and his second Copa del Rey title. This final was postponed from a year earlier, so Silva and Carlos Fernández had taken no part in the other rounds played in the 2019−20 season.

On 21 July 2023, Silva ruptured his anterior cruciate ligament. Just 6 days later, on 27 July, he announced his retirement from professional football aged 37.

=== Sha Tin ===
On 7 October 2026, following three years of retirement, Silva announced his return to football, signing for Hong Kong Premier League club Sha Tin for one game. On 7 November 2026, Silva started for Sha Tin in a league game against Hong Kong Rangers. He scored a penalty and won the player of the match award, and the game ended in a 1–1 draw.

== International career ==
Silva first represented Spain in the 2003 FIFA U-17 World Championship in Finland, scoring three goals. In 2006, he became an under-21 international and scored four goals during the 2005 FIFA World Youth Championship; this was enough to earn him joint-fourth place in the goal ranking, alongside Italian striker Graziano Pellè.

Silva made his senior international debut in an 1–0 defeat to Romania on 15 November 2006, in a friendly match and continued to receive call-ups to the side after good contributions in his first matches. On 22 August 2007, he scored his first two goals for Spain, netting twice in a 3–2 friendly win versus Greece, and was then called up in the final 23-man squad for UEFA Euro 2008.

=== UEFA Euro 2008 ===
Silva started five of Spain's six matches at Euro 2008. In Spain's second group stage match against Sweden in Innsbruck, he assisted Fernando Torres with a pinpoint cross from the edge of the box, with the then-Liverpool forward scoring the opener in an eventual 2–1 win.

In the semi-finals game against Russia, Silva scored the third goal for Spain after a quick counter-attack in which Cesc Fàbregas delivered a low cross, and he sent the ball into Igor Akinfeev's goal with his left—foot. In the final, he was involved in an incident with Germany's Lukas Podolski. After he pulled Podolski to the ground, the German approached Silva, which resulted in an angry exchange of words and a coming together of heads that the referee decided not to punish. Shortly afterward, Spanish coach Luis Aragonés substituted Silva for Santi Cazorla in an attempt to calm the tensions.

=== 2010 FIFA World Cup ===
After appearing regularly during 2010 FIFA World Cup qualification, Silva was also selected for the squad for the finals in South Africa. He played in the first match against Switzerland which ended in a 1–0 defeat, then against Germany in the semi-finals, as a late substitute in a 1–0 victory.

Spain eventually won their first World Cup title after beating the Netherlands 1–0 after extra—time in the final.

=== UEFA Euro 2012 Qualifying ===
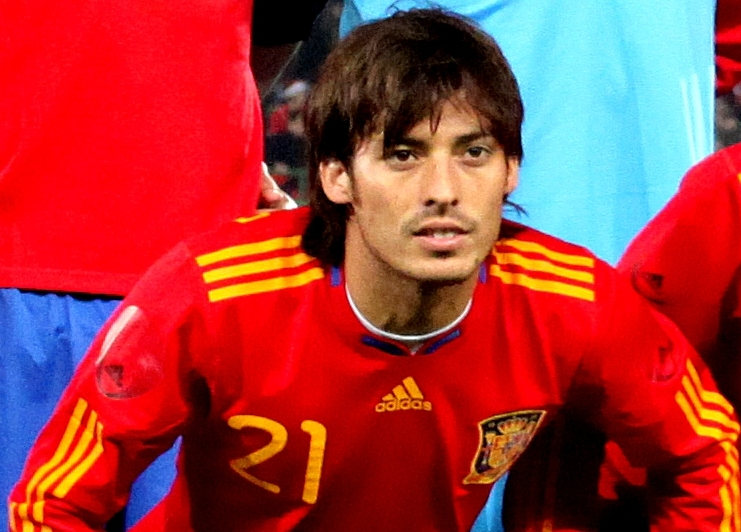
Silva lining up for Spain in 2009

On 11 August 2010, during an international friendly with Mexico, Silva scored two minutes into the second-half injury time, ending the match in a 1–1 draw. In a Euro 2012 qualifier against Liechtenstein on 3 September 2010, Silva scored after 62 minutes, in a 4–0 away win. The following month, in the same competition, he scored through a rare header, as the national team secured a 3-1 win against Lithuania in Salamanca.

In a friendly match against Colombia on 9 February 2011, he came off the bench to score the match's only goal with just four minutes remaining, helping Spain to a hard-fought 1–0 win. He scored twice and provided one assist in Spain's 3–1 victory against Scotland in their final match of the Euro 2012 qualifiers. He scored the first goal in Spain's 2–2 comeback draw against Costa Rica, a friendly match where he came on as a substitute in the second—half with Spain trailing 2–0. He once again scored in a friendly against Venezuela to make the score 2–0 in a match that ended in a 5–0 win. Heading into Euro 2012, he scored in their pre-tournament friendly against China by finishing off a short give and go from Andrés Iniesta in the 84th minute.

=== UEFA Euro 2012 ===
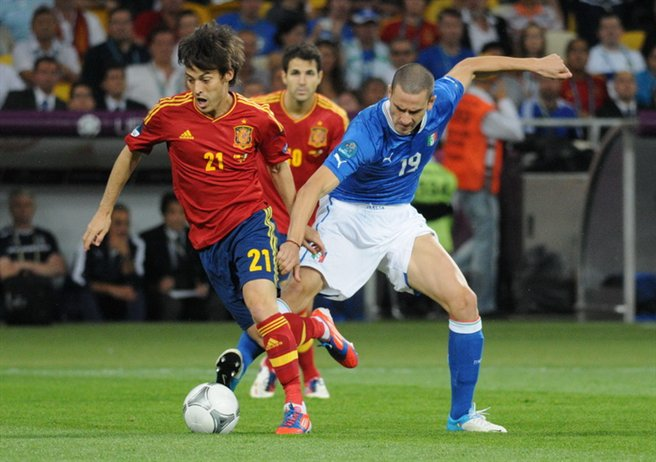
Silva (left) on the ball for Spain in the UEFA Euro 2012 final

Silva was a starter in all six matches of Spain's Euro 2012 campaign. In their opening match of the tournament against Italy, he delivered a superb flicked through ball to Cesc Fàbregas, who scored to level the match at 1–1.

In Spain's second Group C match against the Republic of Ireland, Silva produced one of the performances of the tournament, scoring one and providing two assists in a 4–0 win. His goal was mesmeric, as he left Sean St. Ledger on the floor and beat Stephen Ward before coolly slotting it past former Manchester City teammate Shay Given.

In the 14th minute of the UEFA Euro 2012 final, he headed home a Cesc Fàbregas cross, giving Spain a 1–0 lead. The match ended 4–0 and concluded the tournament in which Silva scored two goals and made three assists, the best efficiency (goals and assists) of any player at the European Championship. He was subsequently named in UEFA's Euro 2012 Team of the Tournament for his performances. He also finished as the joint highest assist provider at the European Championship, with three.

=== 2013 FIFA Confederations Cup ===
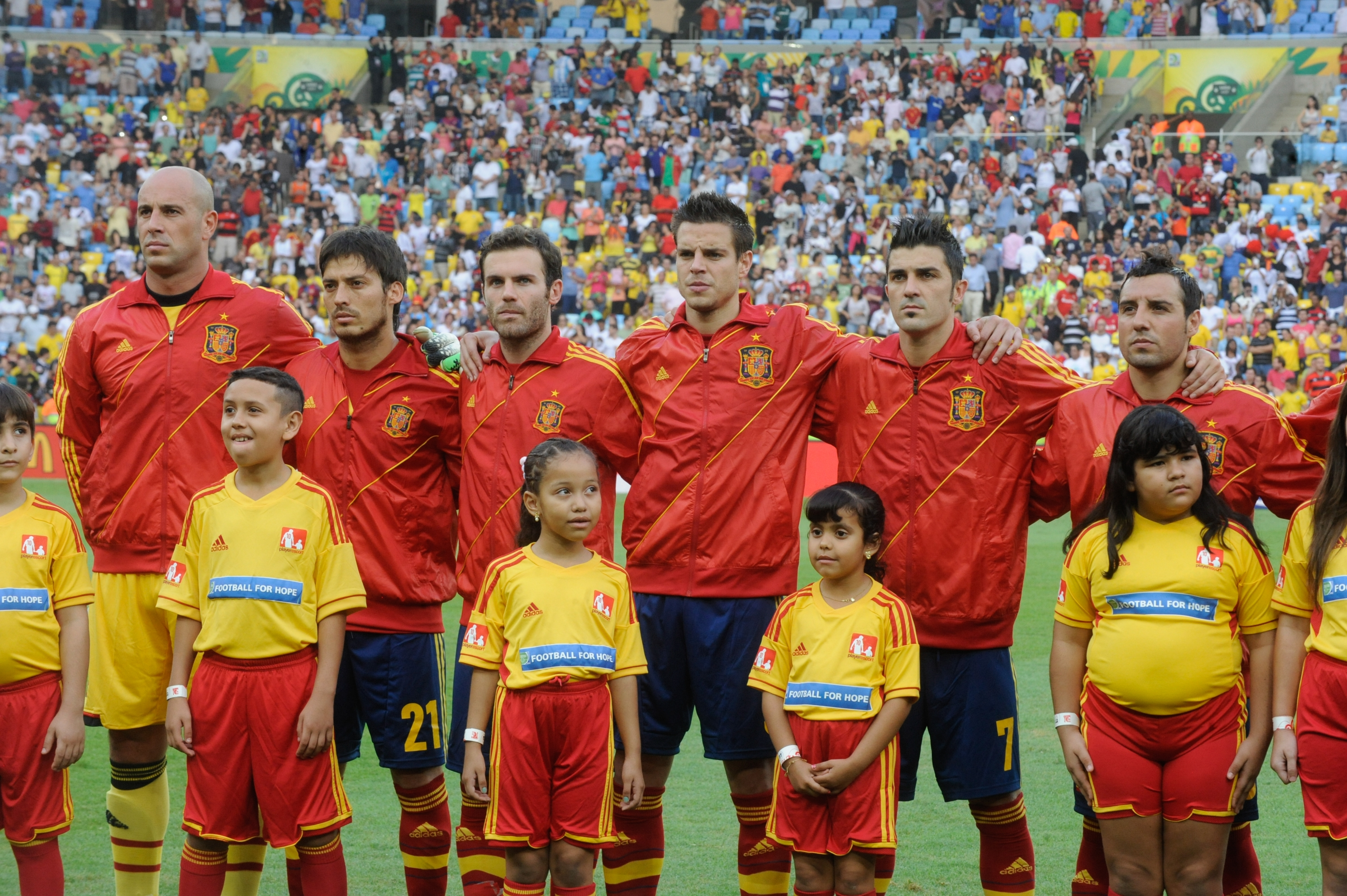
Silva (second from left) lining up with Spain at the 2013 FIFA Confederations Cup

Silva was named in Vicente del Bosque's 23-man squad list for Spain's contestation of the 2013 FIFA Confederations Cup, held in Brazil. On 20 June 2013, he scored two goals and assisted one for David Villa in Spain's 10–0 group stage demolition of Tahiti at the Maracanã. Spain would go on to reach the 2013 FIFA Confederations Cup final, where they were soundly beaten 3–0 by hosts Brazil.

=== 2014 FIFA World Cup ===
Silva was part of Spain's 23-man squad which traveled to Brazil for the 2014 FIFA World Cup. With Spain looking to defend the title they captured four years ago in South Africa, Silva started the opening match against the Netherlands in Bahia. However, they were unable to repeat their success over the Oranje from 2010, and succumbed to a 5–1 loss, despite taking an early lead through an Xabi Alonso penalty.

Silva started the second group stage game, against Chile, playing the full 90 minutes. However, it was another bad outing for the side, who were soundly beaten 2–0 and eliminated from the tournament.

Despite the team's under-performance, Silva was one of the brighter sparks for La Roja, creating seven chances for his team, the most of any Spanish player at the World Cup.

=== UEFA Euro 2016 ===
Euro 2016 was one of Silva's best outings for the national side at a major tournament. starting in all four matches, Silva began the tournament with a show stopping display against the Czech Republic, in which he created six chances for his team the most of any Spain player in a single match at the tournament. The game ended in a 1–0 victory for the reigning European champions.

In the second group game, a clash with Turkey in Nice, Silva was a key cog as Spain produced one of their best performances of the tournament, dispatching the Turks 3–0. Silva was mesmeric throughout, and received a standing ovation from Spain and Turkey fans alike when he was substituted late in the match.

Silva played the full 90 minutes in Spain's third group stage game against Croatia. It was an exceptional display, with the midfielder playing a sublime through ball to teammate Cesc Fàbregas, who squared for Álvaro Morata to score the opener. He later won a penalty, which was missed by Sergio Ramos, as Spain fell to a 2–1 defeat. Despite this, Silva created five chances in the game, the second most of any Spain player in a Euro 2016 match, after himself. Spain were eventually eliminated in the round of 16 by Italy, who beat them 2–0.

Silva ended the tournament averaging 3.3 chances created per 90, the third highest at the tournament.

=== 2018 FIFA World Cup and retirement ===
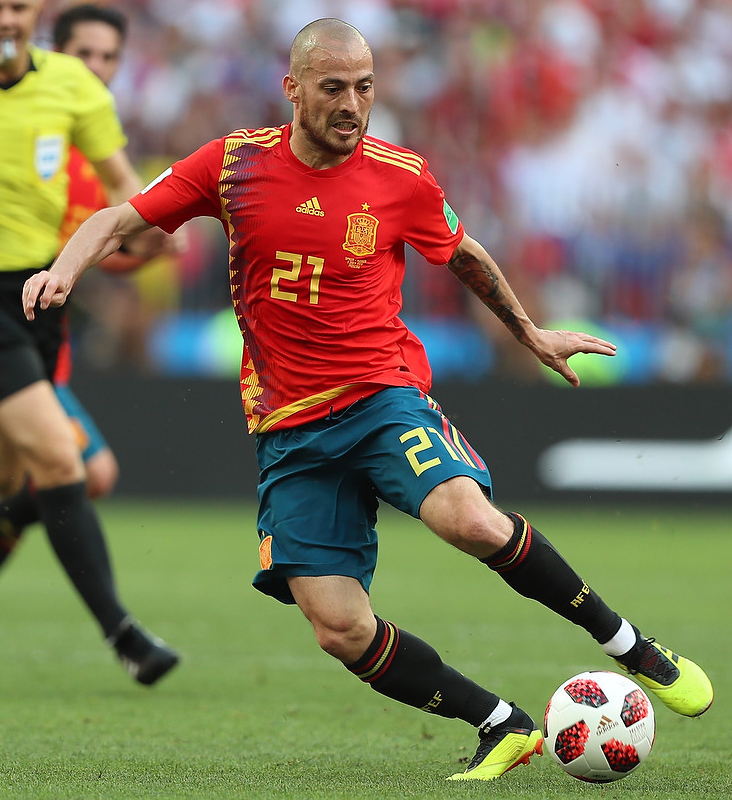
Silva playing for Spain at the 2018 FIFA World Cup

Silva continued his goal scoring record under new boss Julen Lopetegui, scoring 9 times in 12 matches. On 21 May 2018, Silva was selected in Spain's 23–man squad for the 2018 FIFA World Cup in Russia. He started all their matches in their World Cup campaign, which eventually ended with a 3–4 penalty shootout defeat to hosts Russia in the Round of 16.

On 13 August 2018, Silva announced his retirement from international football. He ended his international career with 125 caps for Spain, having scored 35 goals. Following his retirement, Silva drew plaudits from many of his former teammates, being described as "one of the best ever" and "one of the most talented players Spain has ever produced, without a shadow of a doubt" by midfield partners Andrés Iniesta and Xavi. Vicente del Bosque, who led Spain to the 2010 World Cup and Euro 2012 titles, even went as far as to declare Silva "Spain's Lionel Messi".

== Style of play ==
"He pulls the strings on the pitch. A brilliant footballer with great movement, he can score, assist, a player who decides a game. He’s got so much to his game, that I would consider him one of the best ever."

— Andrés Iniesta

"He’s a spectacular footballer. He has been throughout his career. For the national team he has been a cornerstone of that generation of highly talented Spanish footballers. David was a vital component and absolutely essential to that team - one of the most talented players Spain has ever produced, without a shadow of a doubt."

— Xavi

Silva was known as an agile left-footed player by the media, while also being cited for having an excellent first touch, good dribbling skills, and his technical ability, which, along with his movements, allowed him to retain possession in tight spaces, and to create space for him and teammates when attacking. Although he primarily served as a playmaker for his team, Silva was capable of scoring goals himself as well as creating them, which enabled him to be deployed in several offensive roles: he was usually fielded in a free role as an attacking midfielder, where he was given space to roam the pitch, but was also used as a winger, as a false 9, as a second striker or as a deeper-lying central midfielder.

Silva's composure on the ball, as well as his vision, passing accuracy, ability to read the game, pick a pass, and control the tempo of his team's play, saw him become one of the best players in the world in his position, as well as one of the best midfielders in Premier League history, and earned him the nicknames Merlin (reference to the legendary wizard Merlin) and El Mago. He is also considered one of the best midfielders of his generation and arguably Manchester City's greatest ever player. According to a writer for Ultimo Uomo, "Perhaps the way we will remember Silva is precisely for his technical versatility—his ability to make the right move at the right moment, stemming from his total mastery of time and space on the pitch."

Undici, an Italian publication, wrote, "Silva is regarded as one of the most significant foreign players in Premier League history. He defined an era not only for Manchester City but for the English league as a whole." The same publication also drew attention to Silva's distinctive qualities for both Spain and Manchester City: "In the Spain side featuring Xavi, Iniesta, Sergio Busquets, and Xabi Alonso, he was the perfect playmaker; in City's faster, more vertical system, he thrived by initiating attacks from deeper positions, thanks to his exquisite passing and unstoppable runs with the ball at his feet." Sports Illustrated hailed Silva as "the greatest foreign player in Premier League history", claiming that "No player seems as composed and assured in possession as Silva; [...] None of the players who have arrived in the Premier League can claim to have radically changed the game the way he has—the way David Silva has."

== Personal life ==
In December 2017, Silva had been missing matches to return to Spain for personal reasons. On 3 January 2018, he stated that his newborn son, Mateo, had been born extremely prematurely and was fighting to stay alive. On 11 May 2018, Mateo was reported as healthy and was allowed to come home. Silva is a devout Catholic.

== Career statistics ==
=== Club ===
Appearances and goals by club, season and competition
Club	Season	League			National cup (Note: Includes Copa del Rey, FA Cup)		League cup (Note: Includes Football League/EFL Cup)		Europe		Other		Total	
Club	Season	Division	Apps	Goals	Apps	Goals	Apps	Goals	Apps	Goals	Apps	Goals	Apps	Goals
Valencia B	2003–04	Segunda División B	14	1	—		—		—		—		14	1
Eibar (loan)	2004–05	Segunda División	35	4	0	0	—		—		—		35	4
Celta Vigo (loan)	2005–06	La Liga	34	4	4	0	—		—		—		38	4
Valencia	2006–07	La Liga	36	4	4	2	—		11 (Note: Appearances in UEFA Champions League)	3	—		51	9
Valencia	2007–08	La Liga	34	5	8	1	—		8	1	—		50	7
Valencia	2008–09	La Liga	19	4	3	0	—		3 (Note: Appearances in UEFA Europa League)	1	2 (Note: Appearances in Supercopa de España)	1	27	6
Valencia	2009–10	La Liga	30	8	2	1	—		8	1	—		40	10
Valencia	Total		119	21	17	4	—		30	6	2	1	168	32
Manchester City	2010–11	Premier League	35	4	7	1	1	0	10	1	—		53	6
Manchester City	2011–12	Premier League	36	6	1	0	1	0	10 (Note: Six appearances and one goal in UEFA Champions League, four appearances and one goal in UEFA Europa League)	2	1 (Note: Appearance in FA Community Shield)	0	49	8
Manchester City	2012–13	Premier League	32	4	5	1	0	0	3	0	1	0	41	5
Manchester City	2013–14	Premier League	27	7	3	0	4	0	6	1	—		40	8
Manchester City	2014–15	Premier League	32	12	2	0	1	0	6	0	1	0	42	12
Manchester City	2015–16	Premier League	24	2	0	0	4	0	8	2	—		36	4
Manchester City	2016–17	Premier League	34	4	4	2	0	0	7	1	—		45	7
Manchester City	2017–18	Premier League	29	9	2	0	2	1	7	0	—		40	10
Manchester City	2018–19	Premier League	33	6	5	1	3	0	9	3	0	0	50	10
Manchester City	2019–20	Premier League	27	6	5	0	3	0	4	0	1	0	40	6
Manchester City	Total		309	60	34	5	19	1	70	11	4	0	436	77
Real Sociedad	2020–21	La Liga	21	2	1 (Note: Appearance in 2020 Copa del Rey final (played in 2021))	0	—		5	0	—		27	2
Real Sociedad	2021–22	La Liga	25	2	3	0	—		4	0	—		32	2
Real Sociedad	2022–23	La Liga	28	2	1	0	—		5	1	—		34	3
Real Sociedad	Total		74	6	5	0	—		14	1	—		93	7
Sha Tin	2026–27	Hong Kong Premier League	1	1	—		—		—		—		1	1
Career total			586	97	60	9	19	1	114	18	6	1	785	126

=== International ===
Appearances and goals by national team and year
National team	Year	Apps	Goals
Spain	2006	1	0
Spain	2007	10	2
Spain	2008	9	1
Spain	2009	12	3
Spain	2010	12	4
Spain	2011	10	4
Spain	2012	15	4
Spain	2013	8	2
Spain	2014	10	2
Spain	2015	7	1
Spain	2016	15	5
Spain	2017	9	7
Spain	2018	7	0
Total		125	35

Spain score listed first, score column indicates score after each Silva goal.

List of international goals scored by David Silva
No.	Date	Venue	Cap	Opponent	Score	Result	Competition
1	22 August 2007	Toumba Stadium, Thessaloniki, Greece	6	Greece	2–2	3–2	Friendly
2	22 August 2007	Toumba Stadium, Thessaloniki, Greece	6	Greece	3–2	3–2	Friendly
3	26 June 2008	Ernst-Happel-Stadion, Vienna, Austria	18	Russia	3–0	3–0	UEFA Euro 2008
4	5 September 2009	Riazor, A Coruña, Spain	28	Belgium	1–0	5–0	2010 FIFA World Cup qualification
5	5 September 2009	Riazor, A Coruña, Spain	28	Belgium	4–0	5–0	2010 FIFA World Cup qualification
6	14 October 2009	Bilino Polje Stadium, Zenica, Bosnia and Herzegovina	30	Bosnia and Herzegovina	2–0	5–2	2010 FIFA World Cup qualification
7	8 June 2010	La Condomina, Murcia, Spain	36	Poland	2–0	6–0	Friendly
8	11 August 2010	Estadio Azteca, Mexico City, Mexico	39	Mexico	1–1	1–1	Friendly
9	3 September 2010	Rheinpark Stadion, Vaduz, Liechtenstein	40	Liechtenstein	4–0	4–0	UEFA Euro 2012 qualification
10	8 October 2010	Helmántico, Villares de la Reina, Spain	42	Lithuania	3–1	3–1	UEFA Euro 2012 qualification
11	9 February 2011	Santiago Bernabéu, Madrid, Spain	45	Colombia	1–0	1–0	Friendly
12	11 October 2011	José Rico Pérez, Alicante, Spain	52	Scotland	1–0	3–1	UEFA Euro 2012 qualification
13	11 October 2011	José Rico Pérez, Alicante, Spain	52	Scotland	2–0	3–1	UEFA Euro 2012 qualification
14	15 November 2011	Estadio Nacional, San José, Costa Rica	54	Costa Rica	1–2	2–2	Friendly
15	29 February 2012	La Rosaleda, Málaga, Spain	55	Venezuela	2–0	5–0	Friendly
16	3 June 2012	La Cartuja, Seville, Spain	58	China	1–0	1–0	Friendly
17	14 June 2012	Stadion Energa Gdańsk, Gdańsk, Poland	60	Republic of Ireland	2–0	4–0	UEFA Euro 2012
18	1 July 2012	Olimpiyskiy National Sports Complex, Kyiv, Ukraine	65	Italy	1–0	4–0	UEFA Euro 2012
19	20 June 2013	Estádio do Maracanã, Rio de Janeiro, Brazil	74	Tahiti	2–0	10–0	2013 FIFA Confederations Cup
20	20 June 2013	Estádio do Maracanã, Rio de Janeiro, Brazil	74	Tahiti	10–0	10–0	2013 FIFA Confederations Cup
21	8 September 2014	Ciutat de València, Valencia, Spain	86	Macedonia	4–1	5–1	UEFA Euro 2016 qualification
22	12 October 2014	Stade Josy Barthel, Luxembourg City, Luxembourg	88	Luxembourg	1–0	4–0	UEFA Euro 2016 qualification
23	14 June 2015	Borisov Arena, Barysaw, Belarus	92	Belarus	1–0	1–0	UEFA Euro 2016 qualification
24	1 June 2016	Red Bull Arena, Salzburg, Austria	98	South Korea	1–0	6–1	Friendly
25	1 September 2016	King Baudouin Stadium, Brussels, Belgium	104	Belgium	1–0	2–0	Friendly
26	1 September 2016	King Baudouin Stadium, Brussels, Belgium	104	Belgium	2–0	2–0	Friendly
27	5 September 2016	Estadio Reino de León, León, Spain	105	Liechtenstein	3–0	8–0	2018 FIFA World Cup qualification
28	5 September 2016	Estadio Reino de León, León, Spain	105	Liechtenstein	8–0	8–0	2018 FIFA World Cup qualification
29	24 March 2017	El Molinón, Gijón, Spain	110	Israel	1–0	4–1	2018 FIFA World Cup qualification
30	28 March 2017	Stade de France, Saint-Denis, France	111	France	1–0	2–0	Friendly
31	7 June 2017	Estadio Nueva Condomina, Murcia, Spain	112	Colombia	1–0	2–2	Friendly
32	11 June 2017	Philip II Arena, Skopje, Macedonia	113	Macedonia	1–0	2–1	2018 FIFA World Cup qualification
33	5 September 2017	Rheinpark Stadion, Vaduz, Liechtenstein	115	Liechtenstein	4–0	8–0	2018 FIFA World Cup qualification
34	11 November 2017	La Rosaleda, Málaga, Spain	117	Costa Rica	3–0	5–0	Friendly
35	11 November 2017	La Rosaleda, Málaga, Spain	117	Costa Rica	4–0	5–0	Friendly

== Honours ==
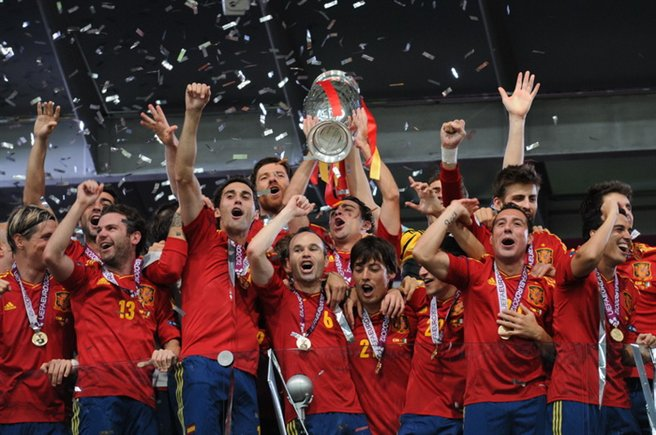
Silva (centre) won three consecutive major trophies (Euro 2008, 2010 World Cup, and Euro 2012) with Spain

Valencia

- Copa del Rey: 2007–08

Manchester City

- Premier League: 2011–12, 2013–14, 2017–18, 2018–19
- FA Cup: 2010–11, 2018–19
- Football League/EFL Cup: 2013–14, 2015–16, 2017–18, 2018–19, 2019–20
- FA Community Shield: 2012, 2019

Real Sociedad

- Copa del Rey: 2019–20

Spain U19

- UEFA European Under-19 Championship: 2004

Spain

- FIFA World Cup: 2010
- UEFA European Championship: 2008, 2012

Individual

- FIFA U-17 World Championship Bronze Ball: 2003
- Pedro Zaballa Award: 2005
- Premier League Player of the Month: September 2011
- Most assists in the Premier League: 2011–12
- Most assists in the UEFA European Championship: 2012
- Manchester City Player of the Season: 2016–17
- Manchester City Players' Player of the Season: 2011–12
- PFA Team of the Year: 2011–12 Premier League, 2017–18 Premier League, 2019–20 Premier League
- UEFA European Championship Team of the Tournament: 2012
- CIES Football Observatory Best Premier League Attacking Midfielder: 2015–16
- Premier League Player of the Year by Northwest Football Awards: 2017
- CIES Football Observatory Top 100 Players of the Season runner-up: 2017–18
- Goal Manchester City Dream Team

Orders

- Medalla de Oro de Canarias: 2010
- Prince of Asturias Award for Sports: 2010
- Gold Medal of the Royal Order of Sporting Merit: 2011

== See also ==
- List of men's footballers with 100 or more international caps
