= Emiliano Moretti =

Italian footballer (born 1981)

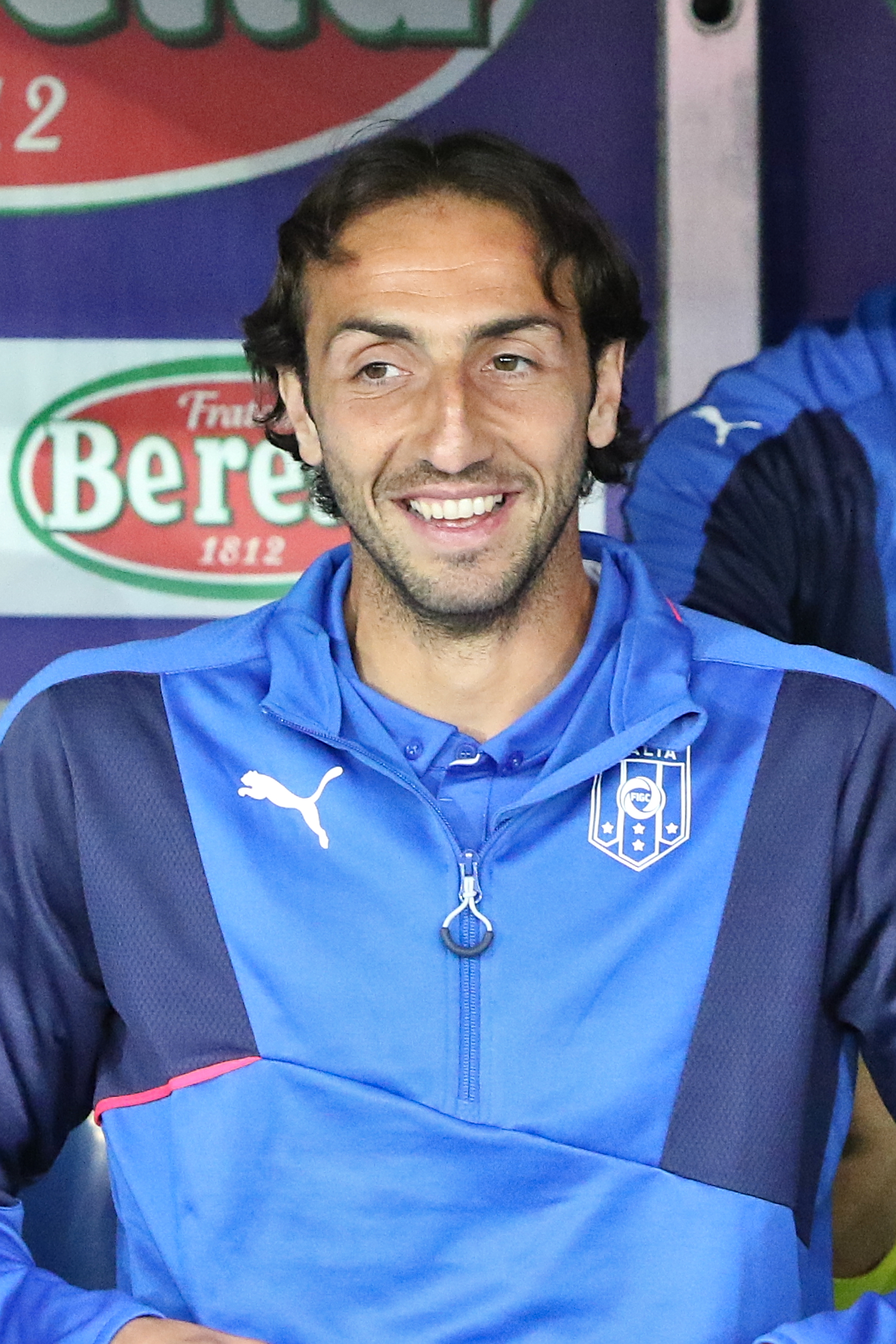
- Moretti with the Italy national team in 2015

Personal information
- Full name: Emiliano Moretti
- Date of birth: 11 June 1981 (age 45)
- Place of birth: Rome, Italy
- Height: 1.87 m (6 ft 2 in)
- Position: Centre back

Youth career
- 1991–1998: Lodigiani

Senior career*
Years	Team	Apps	(Gls)
1998	Lodigiani	5	(0)
1998–2002	Fiorentina	36	(0)
2002–2003	Juventus	8	(0)
2003	→ Modena (loan)	9	(0)
2003–2004	Parma	0	(0)
2003–2004	→ Bologna (loan)	32	(0)
2004–2009	Valencia	135	(4)
2009–2013	Genoa	107	(2)
2013–2019	Torino	175	(5)
Total		507	(11)

International career
1997–1998	Italy U16	4	(0)
2001	Italy U20	1	(0)
2001–2004	Italy U21 / Olympic	24	(0)
2014–2015	Italy	2	(0)
Medal record
Representing Italy
Men's Football
Bronze medal – third place	2004	Team competition
- * Club domestic league appearances and goals

Emiliano Moretti Cavaliere OMRI (Italian pronunciation: [emiˈljaːno moˈretti]; born 11 June 1981) is an Italian former professional footballer who played as a centre back.

He began his career at Lodigiani and was signed by Fiorentina in 1998. In March 2001 he made his debut in Serie A under Roberto Mancini, before spending periods at Juventus, Modena, Parma and Bologna. In 2004, he was signed by Spaniards Valencia, where he won the Copa del Rey in 2007–08. In 2009, he returned to Italy where he spent four seasons with Genoa. In August 2013, he was signed by Torino, where he remained until his retirement in 2019, having collected over 600 career appearances at club level.

Internationally, Moretti represented Italy at under-16 and under-20 youth levels. He was also part of the under-21 team that won the UEFA European Under-21 Championship and a bronze medal at the 2004 Summer Olympics. On 18 November 2014, at the age of 33, he became the oldest player to debut for the Italy national football team, playing as a starter in a friendly against Albania. In total, he collected two appearances for Italy at senior level between 2014 and 2015.

== Club career ==
=== Early career ===
Moretti started his career with local club Lodigiani, and in 1998 transferred to Fiorentina. He made his Serie A debut in March 2001, and was a member of the team that won the 2001 Coppa Italia. In the 2001–02 season, he played in 27 matches. Right before the Fiorentina bankruptcy, Moretti moved to Juventus in June 2002 for a fee of €2.6 million, and was loaned to Modena to help them avoid relegation. In 2003, Parma signed Moretti for €1.8 million (part of Stephen Appiah's €2 million loan), loaning him to Serie A team Bologna. In 2004, with Parma facing financial problems and Claudio Ranieri becoming head coach of Valencia, the left defender was traded to Valencia.

=== Valencia ===
In the summer of 2004 he was transferred outright to Spanish club Valencia, who had already purchased fellow Italians Bernardo Corradi, Marco Di Vaio and Stefano Fiore. On 27 August, while remaining on the bench, he was part of the team that won the UEFA Super Cup, beating Porto 2–1. Claudio Ranieri would use Moretti predominantly at left-back, and, despite a difficult start due to competition with Fábio Aurélio and compatriot Amedeo Carboni, would soon earn the starting spot. He scored his first goal for Valencia on 28 November 2004 in the Primera División in a 2–0 home win against Mallorca. In the Champions League he played 4 games against Inter Milan, Werder Bremen and Anderlecht, with 29 appearances during the season.

The following season, he was a starter, making 33 appearances and a decisive contribution to the achievement of a third-place finish. At the beginning of the following season, on 6 November 2006, in the match against Espanyol, Moretti was seriously injured, damaging his lateral ligament of the knee, forcing him to the sidelines for more than three months. Despite the injury, the season remained one of the most important on a personal level and as a team, which reached the quarter-finals of the Champions League, defeated only by Chelsea. Moretti ended the year with 34 total appearances.

The 2007–08 season was not as positive, which concluded with Valencia tenth. Moretti remained a protagonist of the side, leading to Valencia's victory on 16 April 2008 in the 2008 Copa del Rey final, playing all the matches from the initial stage to the final.

The following season, he was still a starter in the Spanish side, which reached the first knockout round of the UEFA Cup, which concludes the year sixth place in the Primera División. Moretti disputed 32 games.

=== Genoa ===
After 172 appearances and 4 goals with the Spanish club, he returned to Italy to play for Genoa, engaged in the Europa League. The transfer fee was €3.5 million, according to Genoa.

He made his debut for Genoa on 23 August 2009, a 3–2 victory at home against Roma. A week later he scored his first goal in red and blue colours against Atalanta. His first season with the Grifoni finished with 37 appearances and 1 goal in total. The following year, he only made 18 appearances under Gian Piero Gasperini, while the team finished the season in tenth place. The 2011–12 season is even more difficult for the team, and despite 27 appearances and a goal (against Inter Milan), Genoa finished in fourth last position. He was confirmed part of the Genoa defence for the 2012–13 season, contributing 33 total appearances.

On 5 May 2013, he celebrated his hundredth appearances in Serie A with the shirt of Genoa, on the occasion of a match ending 4–1 against Pescara.

=== Torino ===
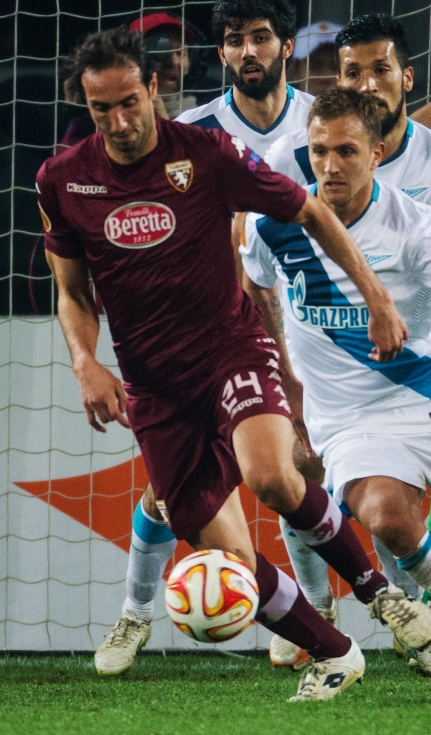
Moretti with Torino in 2015

After being close to a renewal with Genoa, on 11 July 2013 he was signed by Torino on a free transfer, on a two-year contract. He made his competitive debut for the Granata on 17 August, in Coppa Italia against Pescara. He scored his first official goal for Torino on 24 December in a 4–1 win against Catania. At the end of the season he extended his contract until 2016.

On 25 January 2015, he scored a goal in the 94th minute in which Torino defeated Inter Milan at San Siro after 27 years. It was his second goal for Torino.

On 30 August, he scored his first goal of the 2015–16 season, the equaliser in a 3–1 home win against Fiorentina. On 25 November, his contract was renewed until 2017. On 2 April 2017, he scored his first goal of the 2016–17 season in a 2–2 home draw against Udinese. On 5 April, his contract was renewed until 2018.

On 26 May 2019, he made his last appearance for Torino and of his football career, coming on as a substitute for Armando Izzo, and helped Torino beat Lazio 3–1 at home, after which he retired from professional football; in total, he collected over 600 career appearances at club level

== International career ==
Moretti was in Italy's squad in the 1998 UEFA European Under-16 Championship, which the Azzurrini lost to Republic of Ireland in the final. With the under-21, he won the UEFA European Under-21 Championship and a bronze medal at the 2004 Summer Olympics football tournament.

On 9 November 2014, he was called up to the senior national team by Antonio Conte ahead of a UEFA Euro 2016 qualifying match against Croatia and a friendly against Albania. On 18 November, he was deployed as a starter in Genoa during a 1–0 win against Albania, becoming, at 33 years, 5 months and 7 days, the oldest player to debut for Italy. He made his second and final appearance for Italy a 1–1 friendly draw against England in Turin on 31 March 2015.

== Style of play ==
A naturally left-footed defender, Moretti was originally an attacking left-back, but throughout his career he has often been used as a central defender. He is noted for his physicality, good positional sense, excellent technique, and ability in the air.

== Career statistics ==
=== Club ===
Appearances and goals by club, season and competition
Club	Season	League			National cup (Note: Includes Coppa Italia, Copa del Rey.)		Europe		Other		Total	
Club	Season	Division	Apps	Goals	Apps	Goals	Apps	Goals	Apps	Goals	Apps	Goals
Lodigiani	1997–98	Serie C1	5	0	–		–		–		5	0
Fiorentina	1998–99	Serie A	0	0	0	0	–		–		0	0
Fiorentina	1999–2000	Serie A	0	0	0	0	–		–		0	0
Fiorentina	2000–01	Serie A	9	0	4	0	–		1 (Note: Appearance in Supercoppa Italiana)	0	14	0
Fiorentina	2001–02	Serie A	27	0	0	0	6 (Note: Appearances in UEFA Cup)	0	–		33	0
Fiorentina	Total		36	0	4	0	6	0	1	0	47	0
Juventus	2002–03	Serie A	8	0	3	0	3 (Note: Appearances in UEFA Champions League)	0	1	0	15	0
Modena (loan)	2002–03	Serie A	9	0	–		–		–		9	0
Bologna (loan)	2003–04	Serie A	32	0	2	0	–		–		34	0
Valencia	2004–05	Primera División	23	1	0	0	6 (Note: Four appearances in UEFA Champions League, two appearances in UEFA Cup)	0	–		29	1
Valencia	2005–06	Primera División	33	0	0	0	1 (Note: Appearance in UEFA Intertoto Cup)	0	–		34	0
Valencia	2006–07	Primera División	23	2	0	0	10	0	–		33	2
Valencia	2007–08	Primera División	28	1	9	0	7	0	–		44	1
Valencia	2008–09	Primera División	28	0	2	0	–		2 (Note: Appearances in Supercopa de España)	0	32	0
Valencia	Total		135	4	11	0	24	0	2	0	172	4
Genoa	2009–10	Serie A	29	1	1	0	7 (Note: Appearances in UEFA Europa League)	0	–		37	1
Genoa	2010–11	Serie A	18	0	3	0	–		–		21	0
Genoa	2011–12	Serie A	27	1	2	0	–		–		29	1
Genoa	2012–13	Serie A	33	0	1	0	–		–		34	0
Genoa	Total		107	2	7	0	7	0	0	0	121	2
Torino	2013–14	Serie A	36	1	1	0	–		–		37	1
Torino	2014–15	Serie A	35	2	1	0	11	0	–		47	2
Torino	2015–16	Serie A	35	1	3	1	–		–		38	2
Torino	2016–17	Serie A	23	1	3	0	–		–		26	1
Torino	2017–18	Serie A	22	0	2	0	–		–		24	0
Torino	2018–19	Serie A	24	0	2	0	–		–		26	0
Torino	Total		175	5	12	1	11	0	0	0	198	6
Career total			507	11	39	1	51	0	4	0	601	12

=== International ===
Appearances and goals by national team and year
National team	Year	Apps	Goals
Italy	2014	1	0
Italy	2015	1	0
Total		2	0

== Honours ==
Fiorentina

- Coppa Italia: 2000–01

Juventus

- Supercoppa Italiana: 2002
- Serie A: 2002–03

Valencia

- UEFA Super Cup: 2004
- Copa del Rey: 2007–08

Italy U21

- UEFA European Under-21 Championship: 2004
- Olympic bronze: 2004

Orders

- 5th Class / Knight: Cavaliere Ordine al Merito della Repubblica Italiana: 2004
