= Oscar Ustari =

Argentine footballer (born 1986)

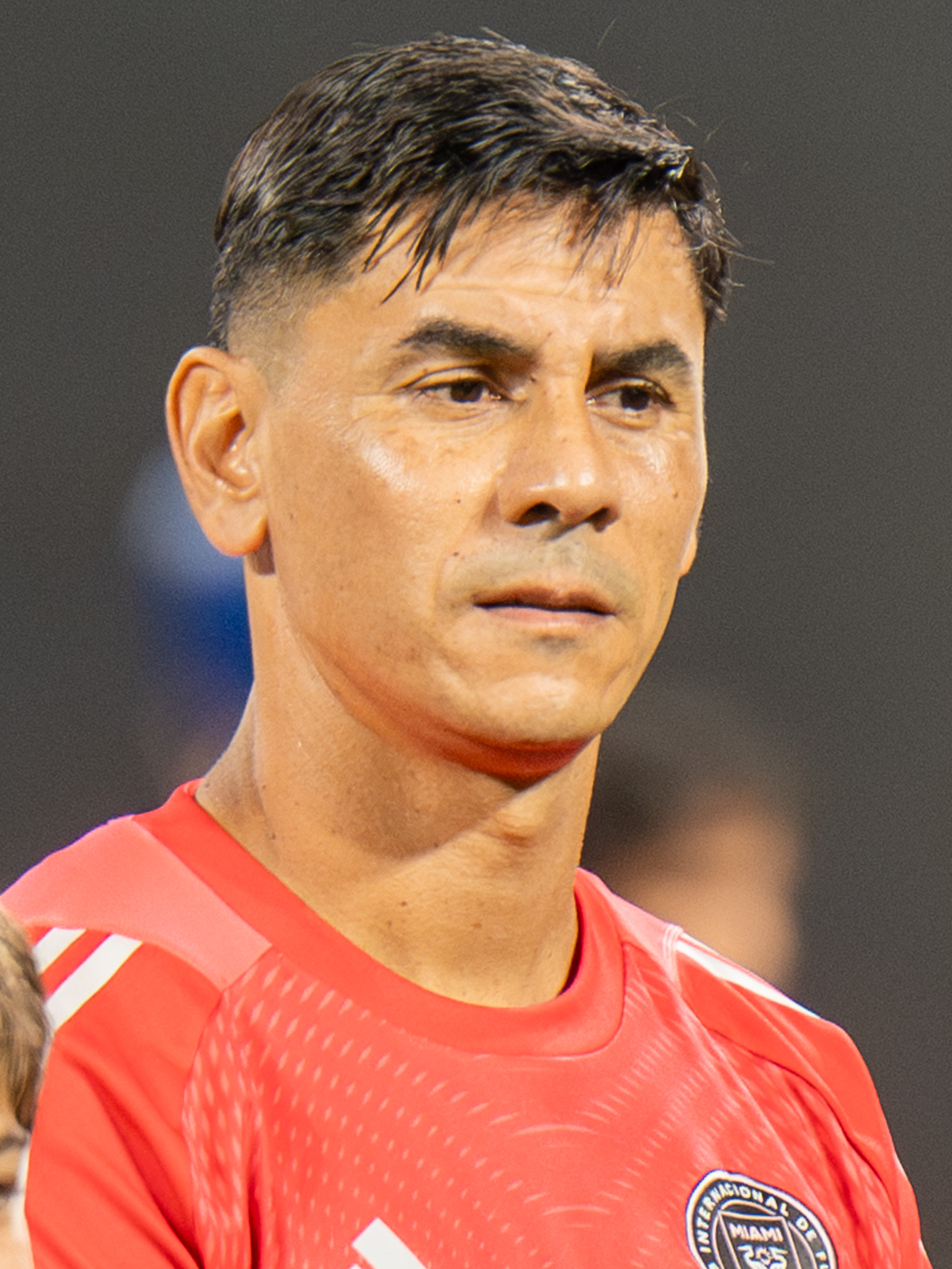
- Ustari with Inter Miami in 2025

Personal information
- Full name: Oscar Alfredo Ustari
- Date of birth: 3 July 1986 (age 40)
- Place of birth: América, Argentina
- Height: 1.84 m (6 ft 0 in)
- Position: Goalkeeper

Youth career
- Rivadavia
- 2000–2005: Independiente

Senior career*
Years	Team	Apps	(Gls)
2005–2007	Independiente	63	(1)
2007–2012	Getafe	41	(0)
2012–2013	Boca Juniors	12	(0)
2013–2014	Almería	0	(0)
2014	Sunderland	0	(0)
2014–2015	Newell's Old Boys	36	(0)
2016–2018	Atlas	42	(0)
2019	Liverpool Montevideo	18	(0)
2020–2023	Pachuca	124	(0)
2024	Audax Italiano	13	(0)
2024–2025	Inter Miami	26	(0)

International career
2003	Argentina U17	6	(0)
2005	Argentina U20	7	(0)
2008	Argentina Olympic	3	(0)
2007–2012	Argentina	2	(0)
Medal record
Representing Argentina
Men's Football
Olympic Games
Gold medal – first place	2008 Beijing	Team competition
FIFA U-20 World Cup
Winner	2005 Netherlands	Team
- * Club domestic league appearances and goals as of 20:19, 12 October 2025 (UTC)

Oscar Alfredo Ustari (born 3 July 1986) is an Argentine professional footballer who plays as a goalkeeper.

After starting out at Independiente, he spent most of his professional career in Spain, mainly with Getafe where he had his spell marred by injuries. He also played several seasons in Liga MX, and won the MLS Cup 2025 with Inter Miami in Major League Soccer.

Ustari represented Argentina at the 2006 World Cup, and won a gold medal with the country at the Summer Olympics in 2008.

== Club career ==
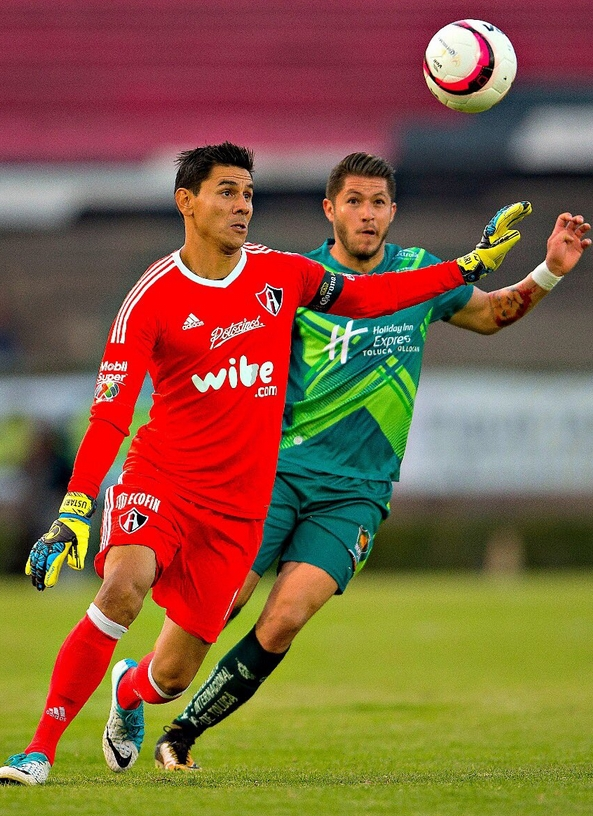
Ustari with Atlas in 2017

Born in América, Buenos Aires Province, Ustari arrived in Independiente's youth system at the age of 14. The untimely deaths of Emiliano Molina and Lucas Molina – both playing in his position – propelled him to the first team sooner than expected, and he made his Primera División debut on 5 October 2005 in a 2–0 win against Newell's Old Boys, remaining first choice with the Avellaneda side in the following tournaments, under both Jorge Burruchaga and Miguel Ángel Santoro (both former players with the club, the latter also a goalkeeper).

On 10 June 2007, Ustari scored from a penalty kick against Quilmes, also leaving the pitch injured and going on to miss the year's Copa América. One month later, he signed for Getafe in Spain for €4 million, teaming up with his compatriot and goalkeeper Roberto Abbondanzieri. His official debut came on 26 September 2007, in a 2–1 La Liga loss at Valencia. He was first-choice in their runner-up run in the Copa del Rey, including in the 3–1 final defeat against the same opposition.

Ustari struggled during his spell in Madrid, due to inconsistent performances and several injury problems. On 17 July 2012, following a 14-month lay-off due to the latter, he terminated his contract which still had another year running.

On 25 July 2012, Ustari returned to his country and joined Boca Juniors. He moved back to Spain one year later, however, with Almería which had just returned to the top flight.

On 21 January 2014, after only four Copa del Rey matches to his credit, Ustari was released by the Andalusians and signed a six-month contract with Sunderland. He made his debut for his new team four days later, keeping a clean sheet in a 1–0 home win over Kidderminster Harriers in the fourth round of the FA Cup. He was also in goal in the following game in the tournament, and the result was the same against Southampton, and was an unused substitute on 2 March in the final loss to Manchester City at Wembley Stadium.

On 6 July 2014, Ustari returned to his homeland again to play for Newell's Old Boys, agreeing to a one-and-a-half-year deal. On 16 December of the following year, he switched to the Mexican Liga MX after signing for Atlas. On 2 November 2017, in the dying minutes of the 1–1 home draw with Tigres UANL while at the service of the latter club, he suffered an horrific injury to his left knee after kicking a long ball forward, going on to be sidelined for nearly two years.

Ustari took his game to the Uruguayan Primera División in July 2019, with the free agent signing with Liverpool Montevideo. He subsequently represented Pachuca in the Mexican top division, Audax Italiano of Chilean Primera División and Major League Soccer's Inter Miami.

Ustari was the undisputed starter for Pachuca throughout the vast majority of his spell, where he won the 2022 Apertura and was also awarded captaincy. At Inter, he became first-choice at the start of the 2025 season over Drake Callender.

In the opening match of the 2025 FIFA Club World Cup against Al Ahly, Ustari produced a number of saves, including a penalty from Trézéguet, in a goalless draw; manager Javier Mascherano praised his performance afterwards, saying: "Oscar kept us alive in the first half, not just on the penalty kick but two or three other great saves".

== International career ==
Ustari played all the matches for the Argentina under-20 team that won the 2005 FIFA World Youth Championship. On 15 May 2006, he was named by senior side coach José Pekerman to the 2006 FIFA World Cup squad alongside his future Getafe teammate Abbondanzieri, being an unused member.

Ustari won his first full cap on 22 August 2007, featuring the entire 2–1 friendly loss in Norway. He also started the victorious campaign of the under-23 team at the 2008 Summer Olympics in Beijing, but suffered a severe foot injury in the quarter-finals against the Netherlands, being sidelined for eight months.

== Personal life ==
Ustari's father-in-law, Ricardo Giusti, was also a footballer. He too represented Independiente, Newell's and Argentina.

== Career statistics ==
=== Club ===
As of match played 1 October 2025

Appearances and goals by club, season and competition
Club	Season	League			Cup		Continental		Other		Total	
Club	Season	Division	Apps	Goals	Apps	Goals	Apps	Goals	Apps	Goals	Apps	Goals
Independiente	2005–06	Argentine Primera División	28	0	0	0	—		—		28	0
Independiente	2006–07	Argentine Primera División	35	1	0	0	—		—		35	1
Independiente	Total		63	1	0	0	—		—		63	1
Getafe	2007–08	La Liga	4	0	8	0	5 (Note: Appearances in UEFA Europa League)	0	—		17	0
Getafe	2008–09	La Liga	5	0	0	0	—		—		5	0
Getafe	2009–10	La Liga	16	0	5	0	—		—		21	0
Getafe	2010–11	La Liga	16	0	4	0	7	0	—		27	0
Getafe	Total		41	0	17	0	12	0	—		70	0
Boca Juniors	2012–13	Argentine Primera División	12	0	2	0	1 (Note: Appearance in Copa Sudamericana)	0	1 (Note: Appearance in Supercopa Argentina)	0	16	0
Almería	2013–14	La Liga	0	0	4	0	—		—		4	0
Sunderland	2013–14	Premier League	0	0	3	0	—		0	0	3	0
Newell's Old Boys	2014	Argentine Primera División	19	0	0	0	—		—		19	0
Newell's Old Boys	2015	Argentine Primera División	17	0	0	0	—		—		17	0
Newell's Old Boys	Total		36	0	0	0	—		—		36	0
Atlas	2015–16	Liga MX	11	0	1	0	—		—		12	0
Atlas	2016–17	Liga MX	24	0	0	0	—		—		24	0
Atlas	2017–18	Liga MX	7	0	2	0	—		—		9	0
Atlas	Total		42	0	3	0	—		—		45	0
Liverpool	2019	Uruguayan Primera División	18	0	—		—		—		18	0
Pachuca	2019–20	Liga MX	5	0	1	0	—		—		6	0
Pachuca	2020–21	Liga MX	40	0	—		—		—		40	0
Pachuca	2021–22	Liga MX	38	0	—		—		—		38	0
Pachuca	2022–23	Liga MX	38	0	—		2 (Note: Appearances in CONCACAF Champions League)	0	—		40	0
Pachuca	2023–24	Liga MX	3	0	—		—		—		3	0
Pachuca	Total		124	0	—		2	0	—		126	0
Audax Italiano	2024	Chilean Primera División	13	0	0	0	—		—		13	0
Inter Miami	2024	Major League Soccer	1	0	—		—		0	0	1	0
Inter Miami	2025	Major League Soccer	25	0	—		8	0	7 (Note: Four appearances in FIFA Club World Cup, three appearances in Leagues Cup)	0	40	0
Inter Miami	Total		26	0	0	0	8	0	7	0	41	0
Career total			375	1	30	0	23	0	8	0	436	1

=== International ===
Appearances and goals by national team and year
National team	Year	Apps	Goals
Argentina	2004	0	0
Argentina	2005	0	0
Argentina	2006	0	0
Argentina	2007	1	0
Argentina	2008	0	0
Argentina	2010	0	0
Argentina	2012	1	0
Argentina	2013	0	0
Total		2	0

== Honours ==
Boca Juniors

- Copa Argentina: 2011–12

Getafe

- Copa del Rey runner-up: 2007–08

Sunderland

- Football League Cup runner-up: 2013–14

Pachuca

- Liga MX: Apertura 2022

Inter Miami

- MLS Cup: 2025
- Supporters' Shield: 2024

Argentina Youth

- FIFA U-20 World Cup: 2005
- Summer Olympic Games: 2008

Individual

- Liga MX All-Star: 2022
