= Alexis (footballer, born 1985) =

Spanish footballer

Personal information
- Full name: Alexis Ruano Delgado
- Date of birth: 4 August 1985 (age 41)
- Place of birth: Málaga, Spain
- Height: 1.83 m (6 ft 0 in)
- Position: Defender

Youth career
- Málaga

Senior career*
Years	Team	Apps	(Gls)
2002–2005	Málaga B	65	(0)
2004–2006	Málaga	50	(3)
2006–2007	Getafe	24	(2)
2007–2010	Valencia	62	(2)
2010–2013	Sevilla	22	(1)
2012–2013	→ Getafe (loan)	38	(4)
2013–2016	Getafe	73	(2)
2016	Beşiktaş	10	(1)
2016–2018	Alavés	52	(3)
2018	Al-Ahli	8	(0)
2019–2020	Racing Santander	20	(0)
Total		424	(18)

International career
2001–2003	Spain U17	18	(0)
2002–2004	Spain U19	11	(0)
2002–2005	Spain U20	8	(0)
2004–2006	Spain U21	3	(0)
- * Club domestic league appearances and goals

Alexis Ruano Delgado (born 4 August 1985), known simply as Alexis, is a Spanish former professional footballer. Mainly a central defender, he could also play as a full-back.

He amassed La Liga totals of 321 matches and 17 goals over 15 seasons, representing in the competition Málaga, Getafe (two spells), Valencia, Sevilla and Alavés. He also competed in Turkey and Saudi Arabia.

== Club career ==
=== Málaga and Getafe ===
Born in Málaga, Alexis joined Getafe CF from Málaga CF for 2006–07; he had spent three years at the Andalusia club, alternating between the first team and the second. He first appeared for the main squad of the latter on 15 February 2004, playing eight minutes in a 5–2 home win over RCD Espanyol.

Alexis scored the winning goal for Getafe against Real Madrid, in a 1–0 home victory on 14 October 2006. He was part of the league's best defence that season (only 33 goals in 38 games) under Bernd Schuster.

=== Valencia ===
In April 2007, Valencia signed Alexis to a €6.5 million deal at the Mestalla Stadium that ran until 2013, beating off competition from Real Madrid. After spending most of the campaign sidelined with a serious knee injury, he helped the team to win the Copa del Rey, netting the second goal in a 3–1 victory over his former employers Getafe in the final after Juan Mata had scored the first.

Alexis, who started the season as Raúl Albiol's centre-back partner, scored in a 2–2 draw at UD Almería on 14 September 2008, but also spent two months in the sidelines due to a pubalgia ailment. He played 24 matches the following campaign, helping the Che to a third place in La Liga and former side Málaga avoid relegation as he headed home in the last-minute of the home fixture against CD Tenerife, which dropped down a level instead with that 1–0 loss.

=== Sevilla and Getafe return ===
On 24 August 2010, Alexis joined Sevilla FC for €5 million, signing a six-year contract as a replacement for Arsenal-bound Sébastien Squillaci. He made 21 league appearances in his first year (26 overall) as the team finished fifth and qualified for the UEFA Europa League.

In the third game of 2011–12, Alexis salvaged a point with an 86th-minute header away against Villarreal CF (2–2); he would only be fourth of fifth-choice stopper for new manager Marcelino García Toral, however. In late February 2012, even though the winter transfer window had already closed, he was allowed to join Getafe on loan until the end of the season, as the Madrid outskirts side was immerse in a deep injury crisis to their defensive sector; the move was extended for the entire 2012–13.

Alexis agreed to a permanent four-year deal in the summer of 2013. He continued to be an undisputed starter when healthy, but missed several games due to suspension.

=== Beşiktaş ===
On 21 January 2016, aged 30, Alexis moved abroad for the first time, joining Beşiktaş J.K. of the Turkish Süper Lig for €2 million. After a 3–3 away draw against Akhisar Belediyespor on 23 April, his poor performance led to criticism and accusations of match fixing.

=== Alavés ===
Alexis returned to Spain and its top tier on 29 July 2016, signing for newly promoted club Deportivo Alavés. He scored twice from 24 appearances in his first season, in a ninth-place finish.

=== Later career ===
Alexis moved abroad again on 22 June 2018, joining Al-Ahli Saudi FC in the Saudi Professional League on a two-year contract. He returned to his country on 7 August 2019, however, agreeing to a two-year deal at newly promoted second-division side Racing de Santander.

== Honours ==
Getafe

- Copa del Rey runner-up: 2006–07

Valencia

- Copa del Rey: 2007–08

Beşiktaş

- Süper Lig: 2015–16

Alavés

- Copa del Rey runner-up: 2016–17

Spain

- UEFA European Under-19 Championship: 2004
- FIFA U-20 World Cup runner-up: 2003

Individual

- La Liga Breakthrough Player: 2006–07
