= Paul Abasolo =

Spanish footballer

Personal information
- Full name: Paul Abasolo Amantegi
- Date of birth: 29 June 1984 (age 42)
- Place of birth: Durango, Spain
- Height: 1.84 m (6 ft 1/2 in)
- Position: Forward

Youth career
- 1995–1996: Lauaxeta Ikastola
- 1996–2002: Athletic Bilbao

Senior career*
Years	Team	Apps	(Gls)
2002–2003	Basconia	35	(5)
2003–2004	Barakaldo	24	(1)
2004–2006	Eibar	2	(0)
2005	→ Lemona (loan)	16	(4)
2005–2006	→ Logroñés (loan)	24	(2)
2006–2007	Logroñés	29	(8)
2007–2010	Real Unión	82	(12)
2010	Iurretako		
2011	Lemona	11	(1)
2011–2012	Oviedo	21	(2)
2012–2013	Sestao	26	(0)
2014	Amurrio	13	(5)
2015–2016	Zamudio	45	(17)
2016–2017	Portugalete	12	(8)
2018–2021	Batea	41	(10)
Total		381	(75)
- * Club domestic league appearances and goals

Paul Abasolo Amantegi (Spanish pronunciation: [pawl aβaˈsolo amanˈtexi]; born 29 June 1984) is a Spanish former professional footballer who played as a forward.

== Playing career ==
Born in Durango, Biscay, Abasolo spent seven years connected with Athletic Bilbao, six in the youth system and one with the farm team, CD Basconia. Released in 2003, he played the better part of the following six years in the Segunda División B and in his native Basque Country, the sole exception being SD Eibar in the first part of the 2004–05 season in the Segunda División, with that club loaning him consecutively to two other teams in division three, SD Lemona and Logroñés CF.

In the 2009–10 campaign, Abasolo competed for the second time in the second tier of Spanish football, scoring four goals in 34 games for Real Unión as they suffered relegation one year after being promoted. After a few months playing with a regional league side, he resumed his career in the third division with Lemona, Real Oviedo and Sestao River Club.

== Conviction ==
Convicted of sexual assault in July 2010 for having attacked three young women, Abasolo was acquitted on a fourth charge due to doubts of the alleged victim. He was eventually pardoned by the Government of Spain, but this fact prevented him from being hired by his former club Athletic Bilbao.
