= David Belenguer =

Spanish retired footballer

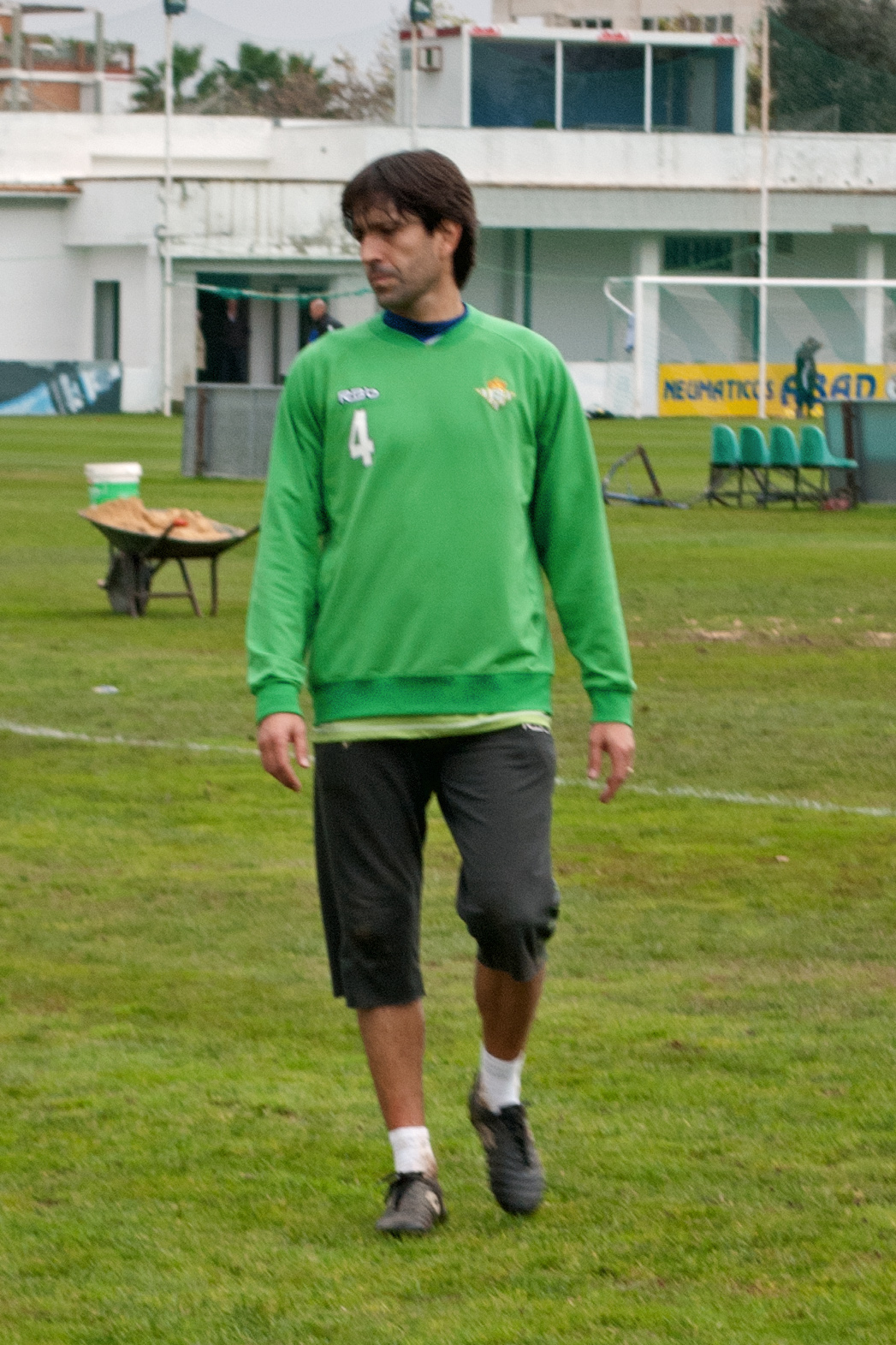
- Belenguer training with Betis in 2010

Personal information
- Full name: David Belenguer Reverte
- Date of birth: 17 December 1972 (age 53)
- Place of birth: Vilassar de Mar, Spain
- Height: 1.82 m (6 ft 0 in)
- Position: Centre-back

Youth career
- Real Madrid

Senior career*
Years	Team	Apps	(Gls)
1992–1993	Real Madrid C	38	(0)
1993–1995	Palamós	32	(0)
1995–1996	Leganés	28	(4)
1996–1997	Celta	0	(0)
1996–1997	→ Lleida (loan)	22	(4)
1997–1998	Albacete	38	(1)
1998–2000	Extremadura	76	(0)
2000–2003	Betis	65	(1)
2004–2010	Getafe	158	(2)
2010–2011	Betis	20	(0)
Total		477	(12)
- * Club domestic league appearances and goals

David Belenguer Reverte (born 17 December 1972) is a Spanish former professional footballer who played as a central defender.

In a 19-year senior career, he was mainly associated with Getafe – where he arrived already in his 30s – helping the club to consolidate in La Liga. Across the two major levels of Spanish football, he appeared in 441 matches.

== Playing career ==
Born in Vilassar de Mar, Barcelona, Catalonia, Belenguer grew in the ranks of Real Madrid and played for a host of Segunda División clubs before finally settling at Real Betis in 2000–01, achieving La Liga promotion that season. He previously made his debut in the competition on 30 August 1998 with CF Extremadura, in a 0–0 home draw against Real Valladolid; the former would be relegated, with the player appearing in 38 games.

In January 2004, Belenguer joined Madrid's Getafe CF, also promoting from the second tier at the end of the campaign. He went on to become a very important member of a side that consolidated their top-flight status (he scored his first league goal on 18 September 2005 in a 4–3 away victory over Deportivo Alavés), while also contributing ten games and one goal as the team reached the quarter-finals in the 2007–08 edition of the UEFA Cup.

Belenguer was sparingly used in his final two years, and left the Coliseum Alfonso Pérez at the end of 2009–10 after seeing out his contract. In his final season he played 13 matches, the last of which was a solid defensive performance at Atlético Madrid on 15 May 2010, as Getafe won 3–0 and clinched the sixth position at the expense of Villarreal CF, thus qualifying for the second time in the club's history for European competition.

In mid-July 2010, when retirement seemed like the most likely option, Belenguer returned to former side Betis by signing a one-year deal, five months short of his 38th birthday. Due to the many injuries that affected the back sector, he was able to contribute 20 league appearances as they returned to the top division after a two-year absence, as champions.

== Post-retirement ==
Belenguer became president of Portuguese club C.D. Tondela on 15 November 2018. In October 2022, he left his role.

== Honours ==
Betis

- Segunda División: 2010–11
