= 2007–08 Copa del Rey =

106th Copa del Rey

Tournament details
- Country: Spain
- Teams: 83

Final positions
- Champions: Valencia (7th title)
- Runner-up: Getafe

Tournament statistics
- Top goal scorer(s): Migue (6 goals)

The 2007–08 Copa del Rey was the 106th staging of the Copa del Rey.

The competition started on 29 August 2007 and concluded on 16 April 2008 with the final, held at the Vicente Calderón Stadium in Madrid, in which Valencia lifted the trophy for the seventh time in their history with a 3–1 victory over Getafe, who were also beaten finalists a year earlier. The cup holders had been Sevilla, but they were eliminated in the round of 16.

== First round ==
29 August 2007
Universidad L. P.	2–0	S. S. Reyes
RSD Alcalá	1–5	Pontevedra CF
Caudal Deportivo	0–1	CD San Isidro
SD Noja	1–2	UB Conquense
Barakaldo CF	1–1 (4–2 PP)	CD Mirandés
SD Lemona	1–2	CF Palencia
Zalla UC	1–3	Real Unión
Burgos CF	2–0	Haro Deportivo
Utebo FC	1–2	CD Valle de Egüés
SD Huesca	1–0	Sestao River Club
CD Dénia	2–1	CF Reus Deportiu
SE Eivissa-Ibiza	0–2	Alicante CF
Coruxo FC	2–4	CF Badalona
Algeciras CF	1–0	Mazarrón CF
Granada Atlético CF	0–1	FC Cartagena
UD Puertollano	2–1	CD Linares
RC Portuense	4–1	Jerez CF
Lorca Deportiva	2–3	Real Jaén

== Second round ==
4 September 2007
UD Las Palmas	1–0	Real Sociedad
5 September 2007
Universidad L.P.	0–1	Alicante CF
Valle de Egüés	1–2	Burgos CF
CD Alcoyano	2–0	UB Conquense
UD Puertollano	2–1	CF Badalona
Pontevedra CF	1–0	FC Cartagena
Real Jaén	0–2	Rayo Vallecano
CD San Isidro	2–5	RC Portuense
Algeciras CF	0–1	CD Dénia
Talavera CF	2–1	Barakaldo CF
CE L'Hospitalet	1–0	SD Huesca
CF Palencia	0–0 (4–5 PP)	SD Ponferradina
Real Unión	3–0	UD Vecindario
Granada 74 CF	1–0	Sporting de Gijón
Albacete Balompié	1–0	CD Castellón
CD Tenerife	1–0	Polideportivo Ejido
Xerez CD	3–1	Racing de Ferrol
UD Salamanca	1–2	Elche CF
Córdoba CF	2–3	Cádiz CF
Deportivo Alavés	1–0	Gimnàstic de Tarragona
Málaga CF	2–1	Celta de Vigo
Hércules CF	2–0	CD Numancia

== Third round ==
10 October 2007
Real Unión	2–1	L'Hospitalet
Burgos	2–0	SD Ponferradina
CD Dénia	3–1	Racing Portuense
Pontevedra CF	2–0	UD Puertollano
Talavera CF	0–2	Alicante CF
CD Alcoyano	1–1	Rayo Vallecano	Pen: 5–3
Elche CF	2–1	SD Eibar
Cádiz CF	2–3	Granada 74 CF
Albacete Balompié	0–2	Xerez CD
Hércules CF	2–1	Deportivo Alavés
CD Tenerife	1–2	Málaga CF

== Final phase ==
Team listed first home in first leg

Round of 32; 13 November 2007; 2 January 2008
Xerez	0	1	1
Recreativo de Huelva	1	1	2
Las Palmas	2	1	3
Villarreal	4	2	6
Dénia	1	3	4
Sevilla	1	4	5
Alcoyano	0	2	2
Barcelona	3	2	5
Elche	1	0	1
Real Betis	1	3	4
Real Unión	1	0	1
Valencia	2	3	5
Granada 74	1	1	2
Atlético Madrid	2	1	3
Real Valladolid	1	3	4
Real Murcia	1	2	3
Burgos	0	1	1
Getafe	1	4	5
Levante	2	1	3
Almería	1	1	2
Osasuna	2	0	2
Mallorca	0	4	4
Alicante	1	1	2
Real Madrid	1	2	3
Pontevedra	1	1	2
Real Zaragoza	0	3	3
Málaga	0	0	0
Racing de Santander	0	2	2
Hércules	2	0	2
Athletic Bilbao	2	2	4
Espanyol	1	2	3
Deportivo de La Coruña	1	1	2

Round of 16; 9 January 2008; 16 January 2008
Recreativo de Huelva	1	0	1
Villarreal	0	2	2
Sevilla	1	0	1
Barcelona	1	0	1
Real Betis	1	1	2
Valencia	2	2	4
Atlético Madrid	0	1	1
Real Valladolid	0	1	1
Getafe	3	1	4
Levante	0	0	0
Mallorca	2	1	3
Real Madrid	1	0	1
Real Zaragoza	1	2	3
Racing de Santander	1	4	5
Athletic Bilbao	1	1	2(4)
Espanyol	1	1	2(3)

Quarterfinals; 23 January 2008; 30 January 2008
Villarreal	0	0	0
Barcelona	0	1	1
Valencia	1	2	3
Atlético Madrid	0	3	3
Getafe	1	1	2
Mallorca	0	2	2
Racing de Santander	2	3	5
Athletic Bilbao	0	3	3

Semifinals; 27/28 February 2008; 19/20 March 2008
Barcelona	1	2	3
Valencia	1	3	4
Getafe	3	1	4
Racing de Santander	1	1	2

Final; 16 April 2008
Valencia	3
Getafe	1

== Quarter-finals ==
Team 1	Agg.	Team 2	1st leg	2nd leg
Racing de Santander	5–3	Athletic Bilbao	2–0	3–3
Getafe	(a) 2–2	Mallorca	1–0	1–2
Valencia	(a) 3–3	Atlético Madrid	1–0	2–3
Villarreal	0–1	Barcelona	0–0	0–1

== Semi-finals ==
Team 1	Agg.	Team 2	1st leg	2nd leg
Getafe	4–2	Racing de Santander	3–1	1–1
Barcelona	3–4	Valencia	1–1	2–3

=== First leg ===
28 February

Getafe	3–1	Racing de Santander
De la Red 25'; Casquero 57'; Manu 83'		Smolarek 28'

Coliseum Alfonso Pérez, Madrid

27 February

Barcelona	1–1	Valencia
Xavi 90+3'		Villa 69'

Camp Nou, Barcelona

=== Second leg ===
19 March

Racing de Santander	1–1	Getafe
Munitis 7'		Casquero 80'

Estadio El Sardinero, Santander

Getafe go to the final 4–2 on aggregate

20 March

Valencia	3–2	Barcelona
Baraja 17'; Mata 44', 73'		Henry 72'; Eto'o 80'

Mestalla, Valencia

Valencia go to the final 4–3 on aggregate

== Final ==
16 April 2008
22:00 CEST

Getafe	1–3	Valencia
Granero 45' (pen.)		Mata 4'; Alexis 11'; Morientes 84'

Vicente Calderón, Madrid
Attendance: 54,000
Referee: Alberto Undiano Mallenco

== Top goalscorers ==
Goalscorers	Goals	Team
(Spain) Migue	6	Dénia
(France) Thierry Henry	4	Barcelona
(Serbia) Nikola Žigić	4	Valencia
(Spain) Joaquín	4	Valencia
(Spain) Juan Mata	4	Valencia
(Spain) Sergio Narváez	3	Portuense
(Spain) Rubén de la Red	3	Getafe
(Brazil) Ricardo Oliveira	3	Zaragoza
(Spain) Paul Abasolo	3	Real Unión
(Spain) Álvaro Valdés Lias	3	Puertollano
