= Manuel Tena =

Spanish footballer (born 1978)

Personal information
- Full name: Manuel Tena López
- Date of birth: 3 February 1978 (age 48)
- Place of birth: Alcalá de Henares, Spain
- Height: 1.87 m (6 ft 2 in)
- Position: Centre-back

Youth career
- Real Madrid

Senior career*
Years	Team	Apps	(Gls)
1997–1998	Real Madrid C		
1998–1999	Real Madrid B	41	(0)
1999	Real Madrid	1	(0)
1999–2002	Valladolid	23	(0)
2000–2001	→ Córdoba (loan)	39	(2)
2002–2008	Getafe	111	(3)
2008–2010	Rayo Vallecano	34	(0)
Total		249	(5)
- * Club domestic league appearances and goals

Manuel Tena López (born 3 February 1978) is a Spanish former professional footballer who played as a central defender.

Over 12 seasons, he totalled 208 matches across both major levels of Spanish football and scored five goals, representing mainly Getafe (six years, four in La Liga).

== Club career ==
Tena was born in Alcalá de Henares, Community of Madrid. He grew as a player in the ranks of Real Madrid, and first appeared officially for the first team on 9 June 1999 in the semi-finals of the Copa del Rey, coming on as a late substitute in a 6–0 away loss against Valencia CF. His La Liga bow came in the last matchday eleven days later, when he played ten minutes for Christian Panucci in the 3–1 home win over Deportivo de La Coruña.

Tena moved to Real Valladolid in 1999, playing a further 23 top-division matches over two seasons and being loaned to Córdoba CF in between. In the summer of 2002 he joined Getafe CF – also in Madrid – in the Segunda División and, instrumental while they achieved promotion to the top flight in 2004, he saw little action after, subbing in in the final minutes of games or playing through injuries and suspensions to teammates; he scored his first goal for the latter on 16 April 2006, in a 1–1 home draw against his first professional club.

In July 2008, Tena signed for Rayo Vallecano, recently promoted to the second tier, on a 2+1 deal. After only seven league appearances in his second season, he retired from football at the age of 32.
