= Javier Casquero =

Spanish footballer (born 1976)

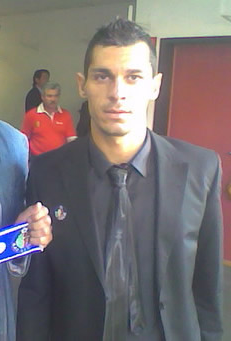
- Casquero with Getafe in 2010

Personal information
- Full name: Francisco Javier Casquero Paredes
- Date of birth: 11 March 1976 (age 50)
- Place of birth: Talavera de la Reina, Spain
- Height: 1.80 m (5 ft 11 in)
- Position: Midfielder

Youth career
- Real Madrid

Senior career*
Years	Team	Apps	(Gls)
1994–1999	Toledo	93	(7)
1997	→ Cultural Leonesa (loan)	17	(1)
1999–2000	Atlético Madrid B	38	(2)
2000–2005	Sevilla	144	(21)
2005–2006	Racing Santander	26	(5)
2006–2012	Getafe	190	(21)
2012–2013	Almería	14	(1)
2013–2014	Sporting Gijón	21	(2)
Total		543	(60)

Managerial career
- 2015: Getafe (assistant)
- 2017: Recreativo
- * Club domestic league appearances and goals

Francisco Javier Casquero Paredes (born 11 March 1976) is a Spanish former professional footballer who played usually as a central midfielder.

Over 11 seasons, he amassed La Liga totals of 322 matches and 43 goals, mainly with Getafe (six years) and Sevilla (four).

== Playing career ==
=== Early years ===
Born in Talavera de la Reina, Province of Toledo, Casquero starting playing professionally with local CD Toledo in the Segunda División, also being loaned for six months to lowly Cultural y Deportiva Leonesa.

He then spent the 1999–2000 season with Atlético Madrid B, where his consistent performances were not enough to prevent their relegation to the third tier.

=== Sevilla and Santander ===
Casquero signed with Sevilla FC of the same tier in the summer of 2000, and with four goals in 38 games he helped the club to achieve promotion after a one-year absence, making his La Liga debut on 26 August 2001 in a 1–2 home loss against FC Barcelona. He would score seven goals in his first top-flight campaign.

Known for his powerful shot, Casquero went on to become one of Sevilla's most effective players, helping in the Andalusians' consolidation with two sixth-places from 2003 to 2005 (although he appeared scarcely in the second). After that, he was deemed surplus to requirements and joined Racing de Santander, where he played one season in the top division.

=== Getafe ===
Already a veteran, Casquero moved for 2006–07 to Madrid's Getafe CF, quickly becoming an undisputed starter. On 10 May 2007, he was one of three players on target in a 4–0 home defeat of Barcelona in the semi-finals of the Copa del Rey, which meant qualification for the decisive match for the first time ever after a 6–5 aggregate win.

Casquero was instrumental in the side's quarter-final run in the UEFA Cup, notably scoring in that stage against FC Bayern Munich in a 3–3 home draw and 4–4 aggregate loss. In the 2007–08 season he appeared in 50 competitive matches, netting eight times.

On 21 April 2009, in the last minute of a 3–2 loss at Real Madrid, Casquero was involved in an incident with Pepe (with the score then at 2–2): he was fouled in the area by his adversary, and then kicked twice while still on the ground after the penalty kick was awarded. He shot it awkwardly, and Gonzalo Higuaín scored in the next play for the final defeat.

Challenged by new signing Dani Parejo in the following two seasons, Casquero still appeared in a total of 59 games, scoring six goals as Getafe consecutively managed to retain their top-division status. Aged 36, he was released by the club in July 2012.

=== Later career ===
Casquero signed a one-year contract with UD Almería on 24 July 2012. He was released on the last day of the following year's January transfer window before signing with another team in division two, Sporting de Gijón, the following month.

== Coaching career ==
In March 2015, Casquero was named assistant manager at Getafe under interim Pablo Franco. He remained in that position until June.

Casquero's first head coaching experience arrived on 12 July 2017, when he was appointed at Segunda División B club Recreativo de Huelva. After less than four months in charge, he was dismissed due to poor results.

== Honours ==
Sevilla

- Segunda División: 2000–01
