= 2008–09 Real Madrid CF season =

Real Madrid
2008–09 season
- President: Vicente Boluda
- Head coach: Bernd Schuster (until 9 December 2008); Juande Ramos (from 9 December 2008)
- Stadium: Santiago Bernabéu
- La Liga: 2nd
- Copa del Rey: Round of 32
- Supercopa de España: Winners
- UEFA Champions League: Round of 16
- Top goalscorer: League: Gonzalo Higuaín (22 goals); All: Gonzalo Higuaín; Raúl (24 each)
- Biggest win: Real Madrid 7–1 Sporting Gijón
- Biggest defeat: Real Madrid 2–6 Barcelona; Liverpool 4–0 Real Madrid
Home colours	Away colours	Third colours

The 2008–09 season was Real Madrid Club de Fútbol's 78th season in La Liga. This article lists all matches that the club played in the 2008–09 season and shows statistics of the club's players.

== Players ==
=== Squad information ===
N	Pos.	Nat.	Name	Age	EU	Since	App	Goals	Ends	Transfer fee	Notes
1	GK	(Spain)	Iker Casillas (VC)	28	EU	1999	468	0	2015	Youth system	
13	GK	(Spain)	Jordi Codina	27	EU	2007	1	0	2010	Youth system	
25	GK	(Poland)	Jerzy Dudek	36	EU	2007	13	0	2009	Free	
5	DF	(Italy)	Fabio Cannavaro	35	EU	2006	110	2	2009	€10M	
3	DF	(Portugal)	Pepe	26	EU	2007	64	0	2017	€30M	Second nationality: Brazil
21	DF	(Germany)	Christoph Metzelder	28	EU	2007	29	0	2010	Free	
4	DF	(Spain)	Sergio Ramos	23	EU	2005	176	22	2021	€27M	
2	DF	(Spain)	Míchel Salgado (VC)	33	EU	1999	369	5	2009	€11M	
22	DF	(Spain)	Miguel Torres	23	EU	2007	67	0	2012	Youth system	
16	DF	(Argentina)	Gabriel Heinze	31	EU	2007	60	3	2011	€12M	Second nationality: Italy
12	DF	(Brazil)	Marcelo	21	Non-EU	2007 (Winter)	71	4	2022	€6.5M	Second nationality: Spain
6	MF	(France)	Lassana Diarra	23	EU	2009 (Winter)	21	0	2013	€20M	#39 in UCL Second nationality: Mali
8	MF	(Argentina)	Fernando Gago	23	EU	2007 (Winter)	89	1	2012	€20M	Second nationality: Italy
6	MF	(Mali)	Mahamadou Diarra	28	EU	2006	97	4	2011	€26M	
24	MF	(Spain)	Javi García	22	EU	2004	21	0	2012	€4M	
18	MF	(Spain)	Rubén de la Red	23	EU	2004	27	3	2011	€4.7M	
14	MF	(Spain)	Guti (VC)	32	EU	1995	506	77	2010	Youth system	
17	MF	(Spain)	Dani Parejo	20	EU	2009 (Winter)	5	0	2011	Youth system	Unregistered in UCL
10	MF	(Netherlands)	Wesley Sneijder	24	EU	2007	64	11	2012	€27M	
23	MF	(Netherlands)	Rafael van der Vaart	26	EU	2008	37	5	2013	€13M	
15	MF	(Netherlands)	Royston Drenthe	22	EU	2007	52	4	2012	€13M	Second nationality: Suriname
18	MF	(France)	Julien Faubert	25	EU	2009 (Winter)	2	0	2009	Loan	Second nationality: Martinique
11	FW	(Netherlands)	Arjen Robben	25	EU	2007	64	13	2012	€36M	
20	FW	(Argentina)	Gonzalo Higuaín	21	EU	2007 (Winter)	72	35	2013	€13M	Second nationality: France
7	FW	(Spain)	Raúl (captain)	31	EU	1994	702	316	2011	Youth system	
9	FW	(Argentina)	Javier Saviola	27	EU	2007	38	7	2011	Free	Second nationality: Spain
17	FW	(Netherlands)	Ruud van Nistelrooy	32	EU	2006	93	63	2010	€15M	
19	FW	(Netherlands)	Klaas-Jan Huntelaar	25	EU	2009 (Winter)	19	8	2013	€20M	
28	FW	(Spain)	Alberto Bueno	21	EU	2008	5	1	Undisclosed	Youth system	
35	FW	(Spain)	Miquel Palanca	21	EU	2008	3	0	Undisclosed	Youth system	
27	DF	(Spain)	Javier Velayos	22	EU	2006	0	0	Undisclosed	Youth system	
36	CB	(Uruguay)	Gary Kagelmacher	21	EU	2008	1	0	Undisclosed	Youth system	Second nationality: Germany
35	FW	(Spain)	Marcos Tébar	23	EU	2008	1	0	Undisclosed	Youth system	

- Last updated: 2009-06-01
- Source: Wikipedia players' articles, ESPN (for appearances and goals) and soccer-spain.com (for EU passport)
- Ordered by position on pitch.

=== In ===
No.	Pos.	Nat.	Name	Age	EU	Moving from	Type	Transfer window	Ends	Transfer fee	Source
23	MF	(Netherlands)	van der Vaart	25	EU	Hamburger SV (Germany)	Transfer	Summer	2013	€13M	Realmadrid
24	MF	(Spain)	Javi García	21	EU	Osasuna	Transfer	Summer	2012	€4M	RealmadridOsasuna
18	MF	(Spain)	de la Red	23	EU	Getafe	Transfer	Summer	2011	€4.7m	Realmadrid
—	DF	(Argentina)	Garay	21	EU	Racing Santander	Transfer	Summer	2014	€10M	Realmadrid
—	MF	(Spain)	Adrián	19	EU	Gimnàstic	Loan Return	Summer	Undisclosed	n/a	
—	MF	(Uruguay)	García	31	EU	Murcia	Loan Return	Summer	Undisclosed	n/a	
—	DF	(Spain)	Agus	23	EU	Celta de Vigo	Loan Return	Summer	Undisclosed	n/a	
—	MF	(Spain)	Granero	20	EU	Getafe	Loan Return	Summer	Undisclosed	n/a	
19	FW	(Netherlands)	Huntelaar	25	EU	Ajax (Netherlands)	Transfer	Winter	2013	€20M	Realmadrid
6	MF	(France)	Lass	23	EU	Portsmouth (England)	Transfer	Winter	2013	€20M	Realmadrid
17	MF	(Spain)	Parejo	19	EU	Queens Park Rangers (England)	Loan Return	Winter	2017		Realmadrid
18	MF	(France)	Faubert	25	EU	West Ham United (England)	Loan	Winter	2009	Loan	Realmadrid

Total spending: ▼€71.7 million

=== Out ===
No.	Pos.	Nat.	Name	Age	EU	Moving to	Type	Transfer window	Transfer fee	Source
—	AM	(Spain)	Parejo	19	EU	Queens Park Rangers (England)	Loaned Out	Summer	n/a	Realmadrid
—	DF	(Argentina)	Garay	21	EU	Racing Santander	Loaned Out	Summer	n/a	Realmadrid
—	MF	(Spain)	Adrián	20	EU	Getafe	Transfer	Summer	€2.2M	Getafecf
18	FW	(Italy)	Cassano	25	EU	Sampdoria (Italy)	Transfer	Summer	Free	Realmadrid
24	MF	(Equatorial Guinea)	Balboa	23	EU	Benfica (Portugal)	Transfer	Summer	€4.5M	RealmadridBenfica
—	MF	(Spain)	Granero	20	EU	Getafe	Transfer	Summer	€5M	RealmadridGetafecf
9	ST	(Spain)	Soldado	23	EU	Getafe	Transfer	Summer	€4M	Realmadrid
19	MF	(Brazil)	J. Baptista	26	EU	Roma (Italy)	Transfer	Summer	€12M	RealmadridASRoma
10	LW	(Brazil)	Robinho	24	Non-EU	Manchester City (England)	Transfer	Summer	€42M	Realmadridmcfc.co.uk
—	MF	(Uruguay)	García	31	EU	PAOK (Greece)	End of contract	Summer	Free	Realmadrid

Last updated: 2008-09-01

Total income: ▲€69.7 million

== Club ==
=== Coaching staff ===
Position	Staff
Head coach	(Spain) Juande Ramos
Assistant coach	(Spain) Marcos Álvarez
Physical trainer	(Italy) Valter di Salvo
Fitness coach	(Spain) Jordi García
Goalkeepers coach	(Spain) Pedro Luis Jaro

Source: Realmadrid.com, El club más laureado del mundo and realmadridfans

=== Kits ===
Supplier: Adidas
Sponsor(s): bwin

Home	Away	Third Kit

Source: "Nueva equipación para los Campeones". Real Madrid C.F. Archived from the original on 6 July 2008.
"Real Madrid's current kit". Adidas.com. Archived from the original on 18 July 2008.

=== Other information ===
President	(Spain) Vicente Boluda
Honorary Life President	(Argentina) (Colombia) (Spain) Alfredo Di Stéfano
Vice-president	(Spain) José Ignacio Rivero
Vice-president	(Spain) Amador Suárez
Secretary of the Board	(Spain) Manuel Serrano
Director of football	(Montenegro) Predrag Mijatović
Technical Secretary	(Spain) Miguel Ángel Portugal
Ground (capacity and dimensions)	Santiago Bernabéu (80,400 / 107x72m)
Budget	€351.8M

Source: Board of Directors (Realmadrid), El club más laureado del mundo, Santiago Bernabéu Stadium and Real Madrid closes the best year in its history

== Competitions ==
=== La Liga ===
==== League table ====
Pos	Team	Pld	W	D	L	GF	GA	GD	Pts	Qualification or relegation
1	Barcelona (C)	38	27	6	5	105	35	+70	87	Qualification for the Champions League group stage
2	Real Madrid	38	25	3	10	83	52	+31	78	Qualification for the Champions League group stage
3	Sevilla	38	21	7	10	54	39	+15	70	Qualification for the Champions League group stage
4	Atlético Madrid	38	20	7	11	80	57	+23	67	Qualification for the Champions League play-off round
5	Villarreal	38	18	11	9	61	54	+7	65	Qualification for the Europa League play-off round

Source: LFP and Yahoo! Sport
Rules for classification: 1) points; 2) head-to-head points; 3) head-to-head goal difference; 4) head-to-head goals scored; 5) goal difference; 6) number of goals scored.
(C) Champions

==== Results by round ====
Round	1	2	3	4	5	6	7	8	9	10	11	12	13	14	15	16	17	18	19	20	21	22	23	24	25	26	27	28	29	30	31	32	33	34	35	36	37	38
Ground	A	H	A	H	A	H	A	H	A	H	A	H	A	H	A	H	H	A	H	H	A	H	A	H	A	H	A	H	A	H	A	H	A	H	A	A	H	A
Result	L	W	W	W	W	D	W	W	D	W	L	W	L	L	L	W	W	W	W	W	W	W	W	W	W	D	W	W	W	W	W	W	W	L	L	L	L	L
Position	13	8	6	3	3	5	5	3	3	4	4	2	4	5	6	5	3	2	2	2	2	2	2	2	2	2	2	2	2	2	2	2	2	2	2	2	2	2

Updated to match(es) played on 2009-06-01. Source: Competitive Matches
A = Away; H = Home; W = Win; D = Draw; L = Loss

==== Matches ====
31 August 2008 1	Deportivo La Coruña	2–1	Real Madrid	A Coruña
21:00 CET	26' Mista; 51' Lopo	Report	47' van Nistelrooy	Stadium: Estadio Riazor; Attendance: 34,600; Referee: Muñiz Fernández

14 September 2008 2	Real Madrid	4–3	Numancia	Madrid
19:00 CET	19' Guti; 25' Higuaín; 33' van der Vaart; 40' (o.g.) Cisma	Report	6', 56' Moreno; 22' Barkero	Stadium: Estadio Santiago Bernabéu; Attendance: 76,000; Referee: Paradas Romero

21 September 2008 3	Racing Santander	0–2	Real Madrid	Santander
19:00 CET		Report	53' de la Red; 73' van Nistelrooy	Stadium: Estadio El Sardinero; Attendance: 22,200; Referee: Pérez Lasa

24 September 2008 4	Real Madrid	7–1	Sporting Gijón	Madrid
22:03 CET	17', 32', 46' van der Vaart; 36' Higuaín; 50' Robben; 58', 63' Raúl	Report	53' Mateo	Stadium: Estadio Santiago Bernabéu; Attendance: 68,000; Referee: Rodríguez Santiago

27 September 2008 5	Betis	1–2	Real Madrid	Sevilla
20:00 CET	54' García	Report	18' Heinze; 90+1' van Nistelrooy	Stadium: Estadio Manuel Ruiz de Lopera; Attendance: 49,500; Referee: Teixeira Vitienes

5 October 2008 6	Real Madrid	2–2	Espanyol	Madrid
21:00 CET	24' Raúl; 44' Raúl	Report	20' (pen.) Tamudo; 31' García	Stadium: Estadio Santiago Bernabéu; Attendance: 72,000; Referee: Pérez Burrull; Man of the Match: Raúl

18 October 2008 7	Atlético Madrid	1–2	Real Madrid	Madrid
20:00 CET	89' Simão	Report	1' van Nistelrooy; 90+6' (pen.) Higuaín	Stadium: Vicente Calderón Stadium; Attendance: 54,800; Referee: Clos Gómez

26 October 2008 8	Real Madrid	3–2	Athletic Bilbao	Madrid
21:00 CET	12' Sneijder; 28' Higuaín; 59' Higuaín	Report	34' Etxeberria; 44' (pen.) Iraola	Stadium: Estadio Santiago Bernabéu; Attendance: 78,000; Referee: Álvarez Izquierdo

2 November 2008 9	Almería	1–1	Real Madrid	Almería
19:00 CET	81' Piatti	Report	37' Raúl	Stadium: Estadio de los Juegos Mediterráneos; Attendance: 17,820; Referee: González Vázquez

8 November 2008 10	Real Madrid	4–3	Málaga	Madrid
20:00 CET	8', 37' (pen.), 70', 77' Higuaín	Report	6' Eliseu; 17' Baha; 69' (pen.) Apoño	Stadium: Estadio Santiago Bernabéu; Attendance: 72,000; Referee: Iturralde González

15 November 2008 11	Valladolid	1–0	Real Madrid	Valladolid
20:00 CET	48' Canobbio	Report		Stadium: Estadio José Zorrilla; Attendance: 21,097; Referee: Fernández Borbalán

22 November 2008 12	Real Madrid	1–0	Recreativo	Madrid
20:00 CET	39' Sneijder	Report		Stadium: Estadio Santiago Bernabéu; Attendance: 74,400; Referee: Muñiz Fernández

29 November 2008 13	Getafe	3–1	Real Madrid	Getafe
20:00 CET	2', 47' Albín; 83' Uche	Report	54' Saviola	Stadium: Coliseum Alfonso Pérez; Attendance: 12,750; Referee: Pérez Burrull

7 December 2008 14	Real Madrid	3–4	Sevilla	Madrid
21:00 CET	19' Raúl; 69' Higuaín; 71' Gago	Report	3' Adriano; 22' Romaric; 39' Kanouté; 85' Renato	Stadium: Estadio Santiago Bernabéu; Attendance: 68,000; Referee: González Vázquez

14 December 2008 15	Barcelona	2–0	Real Madrid	Barcelona
22:00 CET	82' Eto'o; 90' Messi	Report		Stadium: Camp Nou; Attendance: 96,059; Referee: Medina Cantalejo

20 December 2008 16	Real Madrid	1–0	Valencia	Madrid
20:00 CET	3' Higuaín	Report		Stadium: Estadio Santiago Bernabéu; Attendance: 72,000; Referee: Ramírez Domínguez

4 January 2009 17	Real Madrid	1–0	Villarreal	Madrid
17:00 CET	32' Robben	Report		Stadium: Estadio Santiago Bernabéu; Attendance: 79,500; Referee: Mejuto González

11 January 2009 18	Mallorca	0–3	Real Madrid	Mallorca
17:00 CET		Report	3' Robben; 17' Raúl; 66' Ramos	Stadium: Son Moix; Attendance: 19,635; Referee: Undiano Mallenco

18 January 2009 19	Real Madrid	3–1	Osasuna	Madrid
17:00 CET	50' Ramos; 63' Higuaín; 90+2' Robben	Report	20' Nekounam	Stadium: Estadio Santiago Bernabéu; Attendance: 73,000; Referee: Pérez Burrull

25 January 2009 20	Real Madrid	1–0	Deportivo La Coruña	Madrid
21:00 CET	39' Raúl	Report		Stadium: Estadio Santiago Bernabéu; Attendance: 68,000; Referee: Teixeira Vitienes

31 January 2009 21	Numancia	0–2	Real Madrid	Soria
22:00 CET				Stadium: Nuevo Estadio Los Pajaritos; Attendance: 7,500

8 February 2009 22	Real Madrid	1–0	Racing Santander	Madrid
21:00 CET	49' Higuaín	Report		Stadium: Estadio Santiago Bernabéu; Attendance: 76,000; Referee: Carlos Clos Gómez

15 February 2009 23	Sporting Gijón	0–4	Real Madrid	Gijón
--:-- CET				Stadium: El Molinón

22 February 2009 24	Real Madrid	6–1	Betis	Madrid
--:-- CET				Stadium: Estadio Santiago Bernabéu

1 March 2009 25	Espanyol	0–2	Real Madrid	Cornella de Llobregat
22:00 CET		Report	67' Guti; 72' Raúl	Stadium: Estadi Olímpic Lluís Companys; Attendance: 30,000; Referee: Manuel Enrique Mejuto González

8 March 2009 26	Real Madrid	1–1	Atlético Madrid	Madrid
19:00 CET	Huntelaar 57'	Report	Forlán 38'	Stadium: Estadio Santiago Bernabéu; Attendance: 80,000; Referee: David Fernández Borbalán

15 March 2009 27	Athletic Bilbao	2–5	Real Madrid	Athletic Bilbao
21:00 CET	Heinze 36' (o.g.); Yeste (red card) 36'; Llorente 45+1'	Report	Robben 22'; Heinze 34'; Huntelaar 47', 61'; Higuaín 85' (pen.)	Stadium: San Mamés; Attendance: 48,927; Referee: César Muñiz Fernández

22 March 2009 28	Real Madrid	3–0	Almería	Madrid
16:00 CET	Marcelo 23'; Huntelaar 52', 65'	Report		Stadium: Estadio Santiago Bernabéu; Attendance: 80,000; Referee: Antonio Mateu Lahoz

5 April 2009 29	Málaga	0–1	Real Madrid	Málaga
21:00 CET		Report	Higuaín 48'	Stadium: Estadio La Rosaleda; Attendance: 31,000; Referee: Alberto Undiano Mallenco

12 April 2009 30	Real Madrid	2–0	Valladolid	Madrid
16:00 CET	Raúl 44'; Robben 82'	Report		Stadium: Estadio Santiago Bernabéu; Attendance: 70,000; Referee: Rafael Ramírez Domínguez

19 April 2009 31	Recreativo	0–1	Real Madrid	Huelva
21:00 CET		Report	Marcelo 49'	Stadium: A Attendance: 19,000; Referee: Fernando Teixeira Vitienes

22 April 2009 32	Real Madrid	3–2	Getafe	Madrid
20:00 CET	Higuaín 45', 90+1'; Guti 85'; Pepe (yellow card) 57' (red card) 86'	Report	Soldado 9'; Albín 84'	Stadium: Estadio Santiago Bernabéu; Attendance: 75,000; Referee: Carlos Delgado Ferreiro

26 April 2009 33	Sevilla	2–4	Real Madrid	Sevilla
18:00 CET	Renato 15'; Capel 79'	Report	Raúl 45+1', 63', 66'; Marcelo 90+2'	Stadium: Estadio Ramón Sánchez Pizjuán; Attendance: 45,000; Referee: Alfonso Pérez Burrull

2 May 2009 34	Real Madrid	2–6	Barcelona	Madrid
19:00 CET	Higuaín 14'; Ramos 56'	Report	Henry 18', 59'; Puyol 20'; Messi 36', 75'; Piqué 83'	Stadium: Estadio Santiago Bernabéu; Attendance: 80,000; Referee: Alberto Undiano Mallenco

10 May 2009 35	Valencia	3–0	Real Madrid	Valencia
21:00 CET	Mata 29'; Silva 32'; Baraja 68'	Report		Stadium: Mestalla Stadium; Attendance: 54,000; Referee: Eduardo Iturralde González

16 May 2009 36	Villarreal	3–2	Real Madrid	Villarreal
21:00 CET	Pires 17'; Cani 63'; Capedvila 90'	Report	van der Vaart 46'; Higuaín 88'	Stadium: El Madrigal; Attendance: 18,668; Referee: Luis Medina Cantalejo

24 May 2009 37	Real Madrid	1–3	Mallorca	Madrid
20:00 CET	Higuaín 20'	Report	Arango 26'; Cléber Santana 57'; Keita 68'	Stadium: Estadio Santiago Bernabéu; Attendance: 50,000; Referee: Miguel Ángel Ayza Gámez

31 May 2009 38	Osasuna	2–1	Real Madrid	Pamplona
18:00 CET	Plašil 15'; Juanfran 60'	Report	Higuaín 11'; Salgado (red card) 56'; Huntelaar (yellow card) 89' (yellow-red card) 89'	Stadium: Reyno de Navarra Stadium; Attendance: 18,000; Referee: Fernando Teixeira Vitienes

=== Copa del Rey ===
30 October 2008 Round of 32, First leg	Real Unión	3–2	Real Madrid	Stadium Gal
21:00 CET	2' Domínguez; 20' Villar; 63' Goikoetxea	Report	9' Higuaín; 53' Saviola	Attendance: 4,700; Referee: Daudén Ibáñez

11 November 2008 Round of 32, Second leg	Real Madrid	4–3 (6–6 (a) agg.)	Real Unión	Madrid
21:00 CET	36', 50', 85' Raúl; 68' Bueno	Report	13' Abasolo; 49' Salcedo; 90' Romo	Stadium: Estadio Santiago Bernabéu; Attendance: 56,000; Referee: Medina Cantalejo

=== Champions League ===
==== Group H ====
Pos	Team	Pld	W	D	L	GF	GA	GD	Pts	Qualification
1	(Italy) Juventus	6	3	3	0	7	3	+4	12	Advance to knockout phase
2	(Spain) Real Madrid	6	4	0	2	9	5	+4	12	Advance to knockout phase
3	(Russia) Zenit Saint Petersburg	6	1	2	3	4	7	−3	5	Transfer to UEFA Cup
4	(Belarus) BATE Borisov	6	0	3	3	3	8	−5	3	

Source: RSSSF

17 September 2008 1	Real Madrid (Spain)	2–0	(Belarus) BATE Borisov	Madrid
21:45 CET	Ramos 11' van Nistelrooy 57'	Report		Stadium: Estadio Santiago Bernabéu; Attendance: 55,099; Referee: Alain Hamer (Luxembourg)

30 September 2008 2	Zenit St. Petersburg (Russia)	1–2	(Spain) Real Madrid	Saint Petersburg
18:30 CET	Danny 25'	Report	Hubočan 4' (o.g.) van Nistelrooy 31'	Stadium: Petrovsky Stadium; Attendance: 21,075; Referee: M. Busacca (Switzerland)

21 October 2008 3	Juventus (Italy)	2–1	(Spain) Real Madrid	Turin
20:45 CET	Del Piero 5'; Amauri 49'		van Nistelrooy 66'	Stadium: Stadio Olimpico di Torino; Attendance: 25,813; Referee: W. Stark (Germany)

5 November 2008 4	Real Madrid (Spain)	0–2	(Italy) Juventus	Madrid
20:45 CET		Report	Del Piero 17', 67'	Stadium: Estadio Santiago Bernabéu; Attendance: 71,560; Referee: Pieter Vink (Netherlands)

25 November 2008 5	BATE Borisov (Belarus)	0–1	(Spain) Real Madrid	Minsk
20:45 CET		Report	Raúl 7'	Stadium: Haradzki Stadium; Attendance: 30,500; Referee: Terje Hauge (Norway)

10 December 2008 6	Real Madrid (Spain)	3–0	(Russia) Zenit St. Petersburg	Madrid
21:45 CET	Raúl 25', 57'; Robben 50'	Report		Stadium: Estadio Santiago Bernabéu; Attendance: 46,265; Referee: Jonas Eriksson (Sweden)

==== Round of 16 ====
25 February 2009	Real Madrid (Spain)	0–1	(England) Liverpool	Madrid
		Report	Benayoun 82'	Stadium: Santiago Bernabéu Stadium; Attendance: 80,354; Referee: Roberto Rosetti

10 March 2009	Liverpool (England)	4–0	(Spain) Real Madrid	Liverpool
	F. Torres 16'; Gerrard 28' (pen.), 47'; Dossena 88'	Report		Stadium: Anfield; Attendance: 45,362; Referee: Frank De Bleeckere

=== Supercopa de España ===
17 August 2008 1st leg	Valencia	3–2	Real Madrid	Valencia
22:05 CET	58' Villa; 55' Mata; 80' Vicente	Report	13', 67' van Nistelrooy	Stadium: Mestalla Stadium; Attendance: 35,000; Referee: M. Cantalejo

24 August 2008 2nd leg	Real Madrid	4–2 (6–5 agg.)	Valencia	Madrid
22:00 CET	49' (pen.) van Nistelrooy; 75' Ramos; 85' de la Red; 88' Higuaín	Report	32' Silva; 89' Morientes	Stadium: Estadio Santiago Bernabéu; Attendance: 60,000; Referee: Iturralde González

=== Friendlies ===
Win Draw Loss

27 July 2008 Friendly	LASK Linz	2–3	Real Madrid	Linz, Austria
19:00 CET (UTC+01:00)	Saurer 14'; Mijatović 90+1' (pen.)	Report	Baptista 21'; Raúl 45'; Saviola 84'	Stadium: Linzer Stadion; Attendance: 20,104; Referee: Drabek Diezmar Austria (Austria)

2 August 2008 Emirates Cup – 1st Round	Hamburger SV	1–2	Real Madrid	London, England
14:00 BST (UTC+01:00)	Zidan 53'	Report	van Nistelrooy 25'; Parejo 84'	Stadium: Emirates Stadium; Attendance: 50,000; Referee: Alan Kelly (Ireland)

3 August 2008 Emirates Cup – 2nd Round	Arsenal	1–0	Real Madrid	London, England
16:15 BST (UTC+01:00)	Adebayor 48' (pen.)	Report		Stadium: Emirates Stadium; Attendance: 60,081; Referee: Clattenburg (England)

8 August 2008 Friendly	Santa Fe	1–2	Real Madrid	Bogotá, Colombia
00:30 CET (UTC+01:00)	Seijas 40'	Report	van der Vaart 77'; Pepe 78'	Stadium: Estadio El Campín; Attendance: 30,000; Referee: Óscar Ruiz (Colombia)

12 August 2008 Friendly	Eintracht Frankfurt	1–1	Real Madrid	Frankfurt, Germany
21:30 CET (UTC+01:00)	Bellaïd 7'	Report	Robinho 71'	Stadium: Commerzbank-Arena; Attendance: 51,500; Referee: Lutz Wagner Germany (Germany)

27 August 2008 Trofeo Santiago Bernabéu	Real Madrid	5–3	Sporting CP	Madrid, Spain
22:00 CET (UTC+01:00)	Higuaín 17', 24'; Robben 19'; Raúl 40' (pen.) van der Vaart 44'	Report	Izmailov 31'; Djaló 75'; Veloso 90+1'	Stadium: Santiago Bernabéu Stadium; Attendance: 60,000; Referee: Velasco Carballo

== Statistics ==
=== Players statistics ===
				Total			La Liga		Champions League		Copa del Rey		Spanish Super Cup	
No.	Pos.	Nat.	Name	Sts	App	Gls	App	Gls	App	Gls	App	Gls	App	Gls
1	GK	(Spain)	Casillas	47	47		38		7				2	
4	RB	(Spain)	Ramos	41	42	6	32	4	8	1			2	1
5	CB	(Italy)	Cannavaro	36	37		29		7		1			
3	CB	(Portugal)	Pepe	32	32		26		5				1	
16	CB	(Argentina)	Heinze	34	34	2	24	2	7		1		2	
12	LB	(Brazil)	Marcelo	29	34	4	27	4	5		2			
11	RW	(Netherlands)	Robben	32	37	8	29	7	6	1			2	
8	DM	(Argentina)	Gago	31	35	1	28	1	6		1			
6	DM	(France)	Lass	21	21		19		2					
7	SS/FW	(Spain)	Raúl	44	47	24	37	18	7	3	1	3	2	
20	FW/RW	(Argentina)	Higuaín	39	44	24	34	22	7		2	1	1	1
10	CM/LM	(Netherlands)	Sneijder	23	27	2	22	2	4		1			
23	AM/SS	(Netherlands)	van der Vaart	21	42	5	32	5	7		1		2	
14	AM	(Spain)	Guti	19	27	3	18	3	6		1		2	
19	FW	(Netherlands)	Huntelaar	13	19	8	19	8						
	FW	(Netherlands)	van Nistelrooy	12	12	10	6	4	4	3			2	3
	DM	(Mali)	Diarra	12	15		9		3		1		2	
22	RB/LB	(Spain)	Miguel Torres	11	17		14		1				2	
21	CB	(Germany)	Metzelder	10	14		12		1		1			
2	RB	(Spain)	M. Salgado	10	13		9		1		2		1	
15	LM/LB	(Netherlands)	Drenthe	9	28		20		5		2		1	
	CM	(Spain)	de la Red	8	11	2	7	1	1		1		2	1
9	FW	(Argentina)	Saviola	4	14	2	8	1	4		2	1		
24	DM	(Spain)	Javi García	4	21		15		3		2		1	
25	GK	(Poland)	Dudek	3	3				1		2			
17	CM	(Spain)	Parejo		5		5							
28	FW	(Spain)	Bueno		6	1	3		1		2	1		
35	RW	(Spain)	Palanca		3		3							
18	MF	(France)	Faubert		2		2							
36	CB	(Uruguay)	Gary	1	1		1							
37	DM/CB	(Spain)	Tébar		1		1							
13	GK	(Spain)	Codina											

Last updated: 2009-06-01
Source: Match reports in competitive matches, LFP.com and Soccernet.espn
Ordered by start team, game starts and position on pitch (from back right to front left)
0 shown as blank

=== Long-term injury list ===
Date	Player	Injury	Estimated Return Date
October 2008	(Spain) Rubén de la Red	Acute syncope	Unknown
November 2008	(Netherlands) Ruud van Nistelrooy	Torn meniscus in right knee	July 2009
November 2008	(Mali) Mahamadou Diarra	Grade IV chondral injury on inner and outer femoral condyle; on lateral tibia plateau. Complex tear on outer meniscus in right knee.	June–September 2009

Last updated: 2009-06-01
Source: Realmadrid.com

=== Suspension list ===
Date	Player	Suspension Reason	Estimated Return Date
April 2009	(Portugal) Pepe	Fighting	10 Matches

Last updated: 2009-06-01
Source: Realmadrid.com

=== Disciplinary record ===
N	Pos.	Nat.	Name	Yellow card	Second yellow card	Red card	Notes
4	RB	(Spain)	Ramos	14	0	1	
8	DM	(Argentina)	Gago	10	1	0	
12	LB	(Brazil)	Marcelo	10	1	1	
23	AM	(Netherlands)	van der Vaart	8	0	1	
3	CB	(Portugal)	Pepe	7	0	1	
2	RB	(Spain)	M. Salgado	5	0	1	
10	AM	(Netherlands)	Sneijder	7	0	0	
6	DM	(France)	Lass	6	0	0	
16	LB	(Argentina)	Heinze	5	1	0	
24	DM	(Spain)	Javi García	5	0	0	
20	FW	(Argentina)	Higuaín	5	0	0	
14	CM	(Spain)	Guti	5	0	0	
11	RW	(Netherlands)	Robben	4	1	0	
7	FW	(Spain)	Raúl	4	0	0	
1	GK	(Spain)	Casillas	3	0	0	
5	CB	(Italy)	Cannavaro	3	0	0	
19	FW	(Netherlands)	Huntelaar	1	1	0	

Last updated: 2009-06-01
Source: Competitive matches and LFP.com
Only competitive matches
(yellow card) = Number of bookings; (second yellow card) = Number of sending offs after a second yellow card; (red card) = Number of sending offs by a direct red card..

=== Start formations ===
Qnt	Formation	Match(es)
31	4–3–3	6–8,11–13,16–17,19–35,41,43–44,47–49
5	4–2–3–1	All other matches
14	4–4–2	1–2,10,14,18,36–40,42,45–46,50

Last updated: 2009-06-01
Source: Match reports in Competitive matches
Only competitive matches.
- It should be pointed out that Real is neither playing 4–3–3 nor 4–4–2, but a hybrid formation between both.

== See also ==
- 2008–09 La Liga
- 2008–09 Copa del Rey
- 2008 Supercopa de España
- 2008–09 UEFA Champions League
