= Marcelo (footballer, born 1988) =

Brazilian footballer (born 1988)

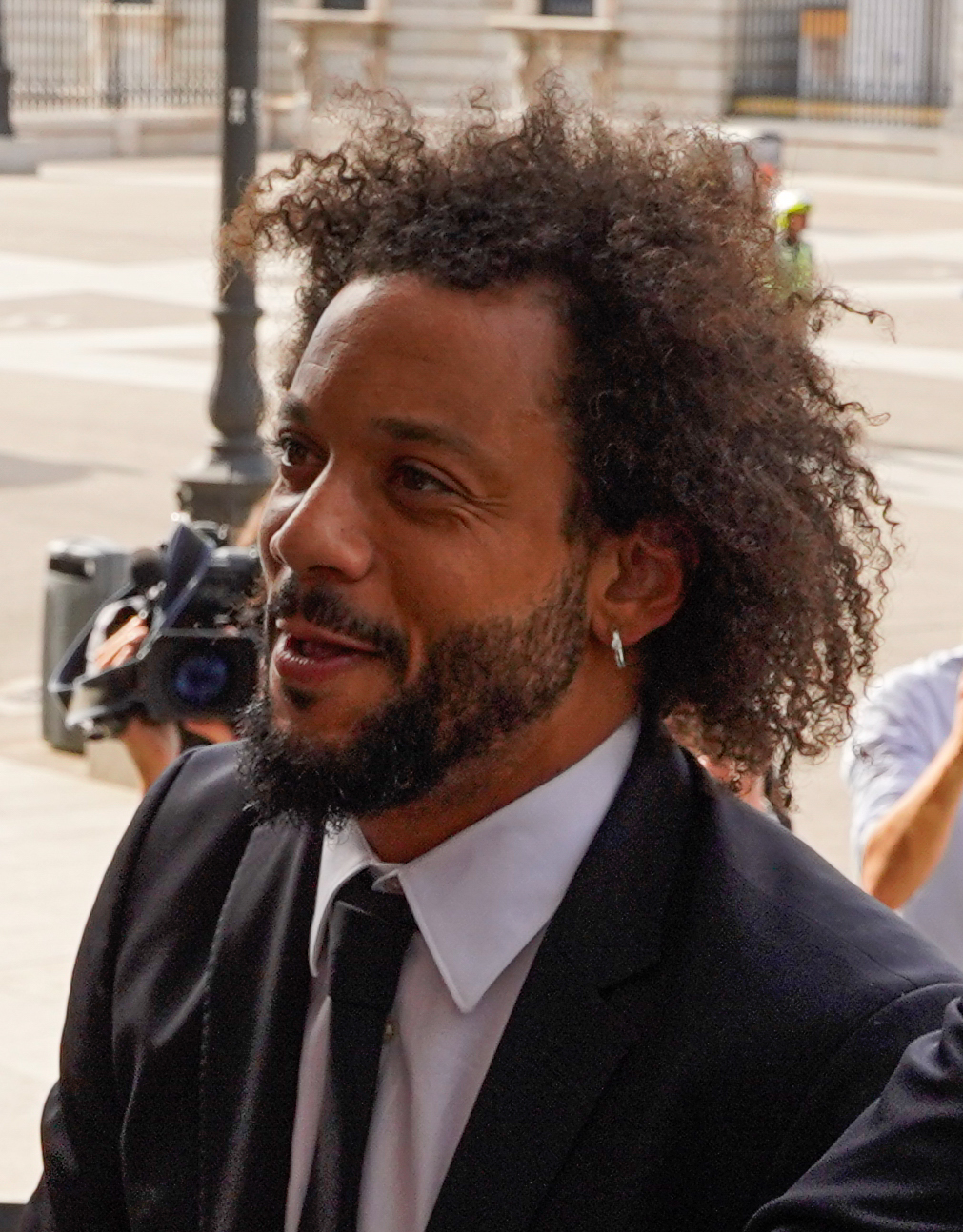
- Marcelo in 2022

Personal information
- Full name: Marcelo Vieira da Silva Júnior
- Date of birth: 12 May 1988 (age 38)
- Place of birth: Rio de Janeiro, Brazil
- Height: 1.74 m (5 ft 9 in)
- Position: Left-back

Youth career
- 2002–2005: Fluminense

Senior career*
Years	Team	Apps	(Gls)
2005–2007	Fluminense	30	(4)
2007–2022	Real Madrid	386	(26)
2022–2023	Olympiacos	5	(3)
2023–2024	Fluminense	43	(3)
Total		464	(36)

International career
2005	Brazil U17	3	(1)
2007	Brazil U20	4	(0)
2008	Brazil U23	6	(1)
2012	Brazil Olympic (O.P.)	6	(0)
2006–2018	Brazil	58	(6)
Medal record
Representing Brazil
FIFA Confederations Cup
Winner	2013 Brazil
Summer Olympics
Silver medal – second place	2012 London	Team
Bronze medal – third place	2008 Beijing	Team
FIFA U-17 World Cup
Runner-up	2005 Peru
- * Club domestic league appearances and goals

Marcelo Vieira da Silva Júnior (born 12 May 1988), known as Marcelo, is a Brazilian former professional footballer who played as a left-back. Widely regarded as one of the greatest left-backs of all time, he is known for his attacking capabilities. He spent most of his career with La Liga club Real Madrid and is one of the club's most decorated players, winning 25 trophies.

Starting his professional career with Fluminense in 2005, Marcelo won a Campeonato Carioca title in his first season and was named in the 2006 Brasileirão Team of the Season. In January 2007, he joined Real Madrid for an €8 million fee. At Real Madrid, he went on to be a mainstay, winning many trophies, including five UEFA Champions League titles and six La Liga titles. In 2021, Marcelo became the captain of Real Madrid from the start of the 2021–22 season, making him the first foreign captain since 1904. After leaving Real Madrid in 2022, he had a five-month spell at Olympiacos, followed by a return to Fluminense in 2023, where he won the Copa Libertadores. He has been named in the FIFPro World XI six times, the UEFA Team of the Year three times, and La Liga's Team of the Season in 2016. He was also named to France Football's "Team of the Decade (2010–2019)".

Having debuted for Brazil in 2006, Marcelo was part of the 2008 Olympic squad and won a bronze medal. Four years later, he was part of Brazil's 2012 Olympic team and won a silver medal. Marcelo played in the 2013 FIFA Confederations Cup as Brazil was victorious, beating Spain 3–0 in the final. He was also part of Brazil's squad at two FIFA World Cups (2014 and 2018), being named in both tournament's Dream Teams.

== Club career ==
=== Fluminense ===
Marcelo started playing futsal at age nine and by age 13, he was on the books of Fluminense in Rio de Janeiro. He came from a very poor background and even considered quitting football, but his grandfather convinced him to continue with the sport.

=== Real Madrid ===
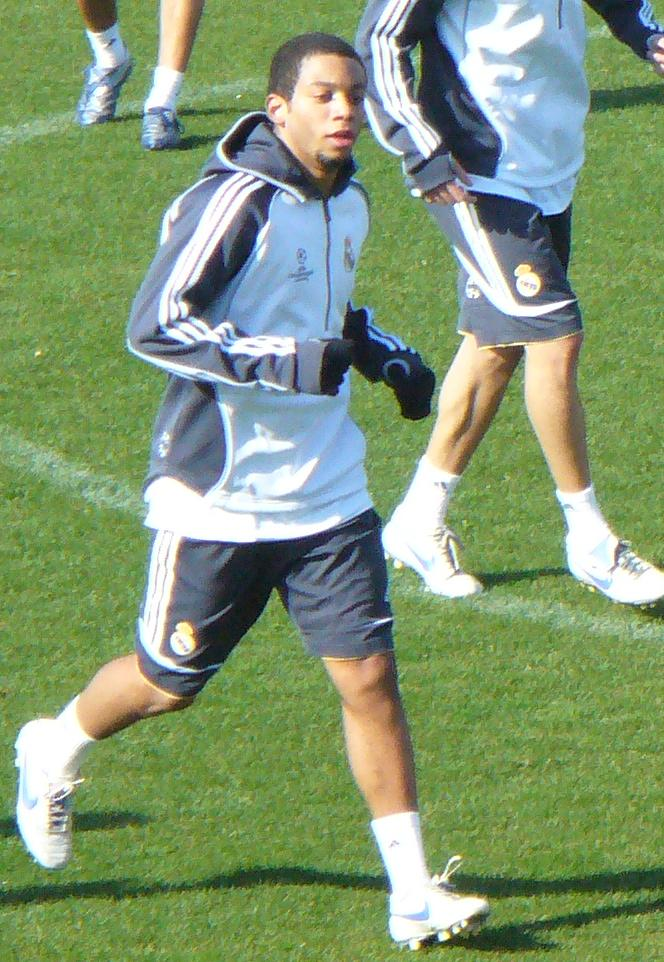
Marcelo training with Real Madrid in 2007

Marcelo joined Real Madrid during the January transfer window in 2007. On his arrival, club president Ramón Calderón said, "He is an important signing for us. He is a young player who will inject some freshness into the side and is part of our plan to bring younger players into the squad. We're very happy because he's a pearl that half of Europe wanted." Many spectators hailed him as Brazilian and Real Madrid great Roberto Carlos' potential successor in the left-back role.

Marcelo made his debut as a substitute in the 2–0 defeat against Deportivo La Coruña on 7 January 2007. On 14 April 2007, then coach Fabio Capello gave Marcelo his first start for Real Madrid against Racing de Santander. Real Madrid controversially lost the game 2–1. In the 2007–08 season, Marcelo started nearly all of Madrid's league games under the new manager Bernd Schuster. His ability, speed running across the field, attack, and defence had enabled him to become a very important player for Real Madrid.

After a string of poor performances in 2009, Marcelo found himself on the bench for much of the remaining season while under new manager Juande Ramos, mainly as deputy to the more defensive-minded Gabriel Heinze. Ramos deployed Marcelo as a winger on more than one occasion, and the Brazilian adapted well to his new role. He scored his first goal after receiving a heel flick from striker Gonzalo Higuaín and slotting the ball past the goalkeeper in Madrid's 4–0 thumping of Sporting Gijón. After the game, coach Ramos declared that Marcelo's future would be positioned as a winger, but will push back to defense when required. Marcelo scored his second goal for Real Madrid in a victory over Almería, a powerful strike from outside the box with his weaker right foot.

On 18 April 2009, he scored his third goal of his Real Madrid career, when he scored the only goal of the game against Huelva away from home. He scored his fourth goal against Sevilla at the Ramón Sánchez Pizjuán in April 2009.

==== 2009–2011: Rise to prominence ====
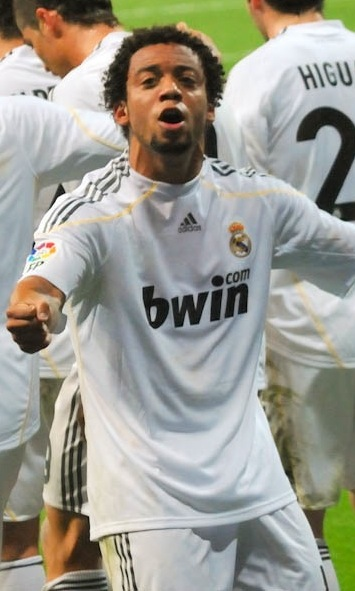
Marcelo with Real Madrid in 2010

Under the next head coach Manuel Pellegrini, Marcelo consistently featured in the starting XI for his versatility and pace along the left flank in offensive and defensive roles. He continued to be employed as a left-winger under Pellegrini, and reached the top of the assist charts of La Liga in the 2009–10 season. He admitted in a press conference at the end of 2009, "I now feel better playing as a winger." His successful performance in Real Madrid's 2009–10 campaign earned him a contract extension on 5 February 2010 with the club until June 2015. This season proved to be his breakthrough season at the club.

In the 2010–11 season under new coach José Mourinho, Marcelo was back in his natural position of left back. He started all league games, paying back the coach's confidence in him with defensive steel and attacking intent and gained the coach's admiration. On 25 November 2010, Marcelo was named as a part of the 55 player shortlist for the FIFA World XI. He scored his first goal of the new season in a 1–0 win against Espanyol on 13 February. He had a terrific match against Lyon in the Champions League. Showing his attacking flair and defensive skills, he opened the scoring with his first-ever Champions League goal and assisted Karim Benzema's goal, at the end he was named man of the match, of which Real went on to win 3–0, and progressed to the quarter-finals for the first time since 2004. Marcelo then continued his fine season by scoring in the second leg of the semi-finals against Barcelona in the Camp Nou. The game ended 1–1, but Real Madrid lost by an aggregate score of 3–1 since they lost 2–0 at home in the first leg. Marcelo's successful campaign in the Champions League earned him a starting spot in UEFA's starting XI. Marcelo was heavily praised by the worldwide media during that season, and many called him the best left back in the world. Diego Maradona said he was the third best player in La Liga, after Cristiano Ronaldo and Lionel Messi.

==== 2011–2013: First-team mainstay ====
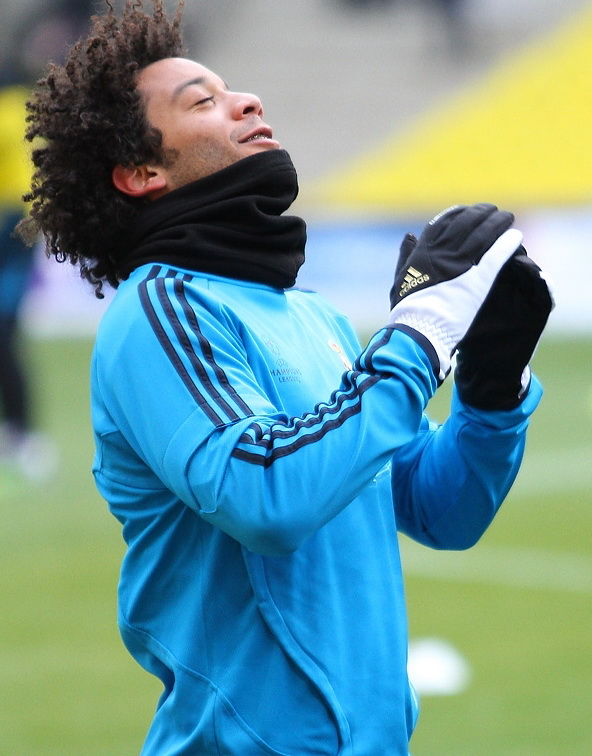
Marcelo training with Real Madrid in 2012

Marcelo was sent off on 17 August 2011 during Madrid's 3–2 loss to Barcelona. On 3 December 2011, Marcelo scored Madrid's third goal in a 3–0 victory over Sporting Gijón in La Liga.

Paolo Maldini gave credits to Marcelo and called him the current left back, "who is a great attacker and a defender, a specialist of both areas."

Roberto Carlos named Marcelo as the world's best left back, saying. "He had more ability than me with the ball and he joins in better," and even called him his heir. Marcelo had shown great performances as a left back, such as in the Champions League quarter-finals against Cypriot club APOEL, while entering as a substitute in the 75th minute for Fábio Coentrão. Marcelo was part of the starting XI as Real Madrid claimed their 32nd league title.

Marcelo scored his first goal of the season against Manchester City in the Champions League group stage on 19 September, Real's first goal of a 3–2 win at the Santiago Bernabéu.

As of February 2013, Marcelo had returned from injury and captained Real Madrid on 23 February at the Estadio Riazor which ended in a 2–1 victory for Los Merengues. On 20 April, he played as the captain again against Real Betis at the Santiago Bernabéu. In the 14th minute, he sustained a muscle injury after intercepting a long through-ball, but the game ended in 3–1 victory for the home side.

==== 2013–2018: European and domestic success ====
Marcelo scored the opening goal for Real Madrid against Chelsea in the Guinness International Champions Cup 2013 final on 7 August; Real Madrid won 3–1. During the league season, he played 28 matches, and scored one goal, in a 3–0 win over Levante on 9 March.

Marcelo scored Real Madrid's third goal of their 4–1 win in the Champions League final against city rivals Atlético Madrid, with an extra-time strike from outside the box after coming on as a substitute for Fábio Coentrão.

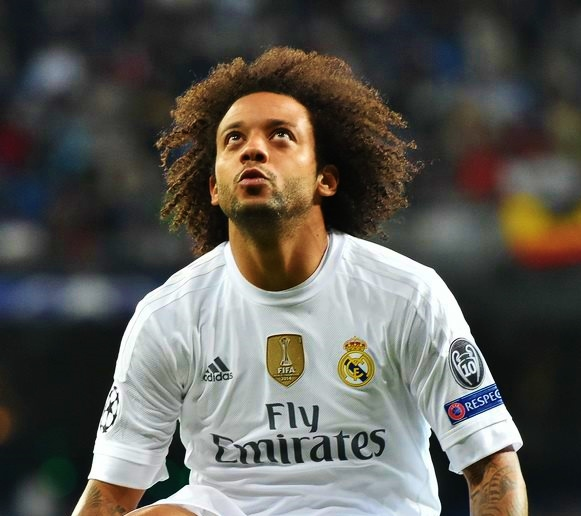
Marcelo in action against Shakhtar Donetsk during the group stages of the 2015–16 UEFA Champions League

On 10 July 2015, Marcelo signed a new contract with Real Madrid, keeping him at the club until 2020. On 18 October 2015, he scored his first goal of the season by scoring Real Madrid's first goal in a 3–0 home win against Levante.

He was a regular starter when the team won the Champions League, beating Atlético Madrid again in the final on penalties.

He played 30 matches when Madrid won the La Liga, and was a regular starter when Madrid won the Champions League after defeating Juventus 4–1 in the final.

On 13 September 2017, Marcelo signed a new contract which would keep him at the club until summer 2022. During the Champions League, he made eleven appearances, while scoring three goals, with Madrid winning their third consecutive and 13th overall Champions League title after defeating Liverpool 3–1 in the final.

==== 2018–2022: Final seasons, captaincy, and departure ====
During the 2018–19 season, he made 34 appearances, winning the Club World Cup for the third consecutive time. Later on, Marcelo made 15 appearances during the 2019–20 league season, as Real Madrid won the league title.

He appeared sporadically in the 2020–21 season due to various injuries and was replaced by Ferland Mendy in the left-back position. He appeared in a total of 19 matches in all competitions as Real Madrid finished second in the league behind Atlético Madrid.

On 16 June 2021, it was announced that he would become the captain of Real Madrid from the start of the 2021–22 season, as the player who had been in the first team for the longest period of time after Sergio Ramos; he was assigned the role after Ramos left, making him the first foreign captain since 1904. On 19 October 2021, Marcelo made his 100th Champions League appearance in a 5–0 win at Shakhtar Donetsk.

On 30 April 2022, after winning La Liga, Marcelo became the player with most titles in the history of Real Madrid, surpassing Paco Gento, with 24. On 28 May 2022, Marcelo lifted his fifth Champions League trophy after defeating Liverpool 1–0 in the final at the Stade de France, despite not featuring in the game itself. After the final, Marcelo announced that he would leave the club after 15 years.

=== Olympiacos ===
On 3 September 2022, Marcelo signed for Super League Greece club Olympiacos. In the Greek Cup round of 16, he scored three goals in two matches against Atromitos. On 18 February 2023, Marcelo terminated his Olympiacos contract, departing from the club after five months.

=== Return to Fluminense ===
On 24 February 2023, Fluminense announced the return of Marcelo to the club. He made his first appearance since his return to the club in the Copa Libertadores on 5 April in a 3–1 away victory against Sporting Cristal. Four days later, Marcelo scored his first goal in his second tenure at the club with a long-range strike in a 4–1 victory against Flamengo in the second leg of the Campeonato Carioca final. As a result, he achieved another trophy with Fluminense, the first during his second spell with the club after a 4–3 win on aggregate.

On 4 November 2023, he started in the Copa Libertadores final with Fluminense against Boca Juniors in the Maracanã Stadium, which ended in a 2–1 victory after extra time, to become the 12th player to win both Champions League and Copa Libertadores titles.

On 2 November 2024, Marcelo left the club by mutual consent. On 6 February 2025, he announced his retirement via his social media channels.

== International career ==
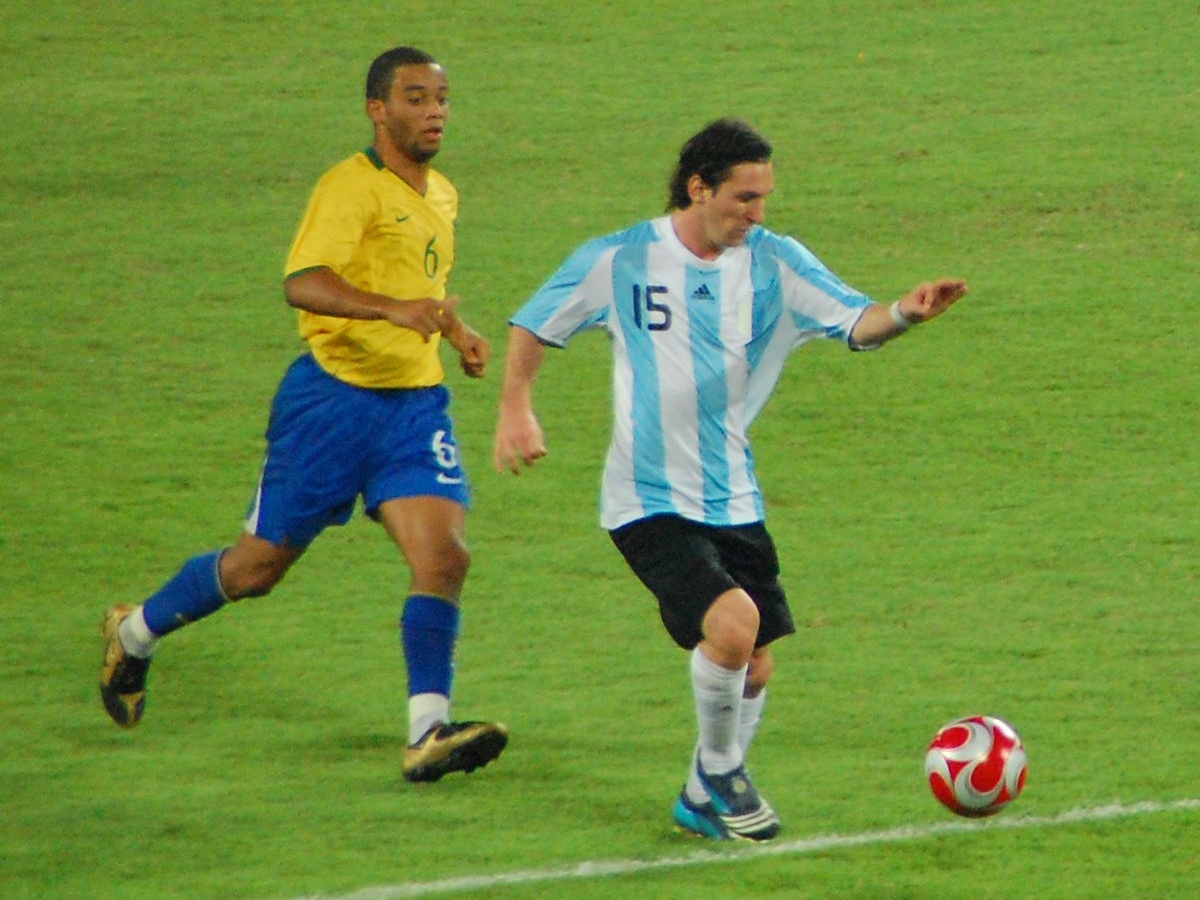
Argentina's Lionel Messi evades Marcelo in the semi-final of the 2008 Summer Olympics.

Marcelo scored in his Brazil debut on 5 September 2006, in a 2–0 victory against Wales at Tottenham Hotspur's White Hart Lane. He got the ball just outside the box and shot a typical Brazilian full-back goal. Marcelo has been compared to former Brazil national team left-back Roberto Carlos, who also played for Real Madrid. The two had played together during the second half of the 2006–07 season before Carlos' move to Turkish club Fenerbahçe.

He was part of the 2008 Olympic squad as Brazil's under-23 squad, where he won a bronze medal.

In May 2010, he was named as one of the seven substitutes for Brazil's 2010 FIFA World Cup squad. Although he was not called up by Brazil coach Dunga, he was selected again by new coach Mano Menezes for a friendly against the United States on 10 August 2010. He was the Man of the Match for a 2–1 win in a friendly against Mexico away on 11 October 2011, as he scored the winner by dribbling past several players and then blasting the goal into the net.

He was part of Brazil's 2012 Summer Olympics as one of the three overage players, with Brazil winning a silver medal.

Marcelo was selected to be in Luiz Felipe Scolari's 23-man Brazil squad that played in the 2013 FIFA Confederations Cup on home soil. He was a starter for all of the matches, including the 3–0 victory over Spain in the final on 30 June, at the Maracanã Stadium.

In the 2014 FIFA World Cup, which was once again played on home soil, Marcelo scored an own goal in the 11th minute of the opening game against Croatia on 12 June, deflecting a shot by Nikica Jelavić. It was the first goal that Brazil had conceded at the World Cup, although they eventually won the match 3–1.

In May 2018, Marcelo was named in the final squad for the 2018 FIFA World Cup. He wore the captain's armband in the first match and was a starter in four of the five matches Brazil played in the competition. Brazil was eliminated by Belgium in the quarter-finals on 6 July 2018, and that was his last match with the national team. In May 2019, he was omitted from Brazil's squad for the 2019 Copa América.

== Style of play ==
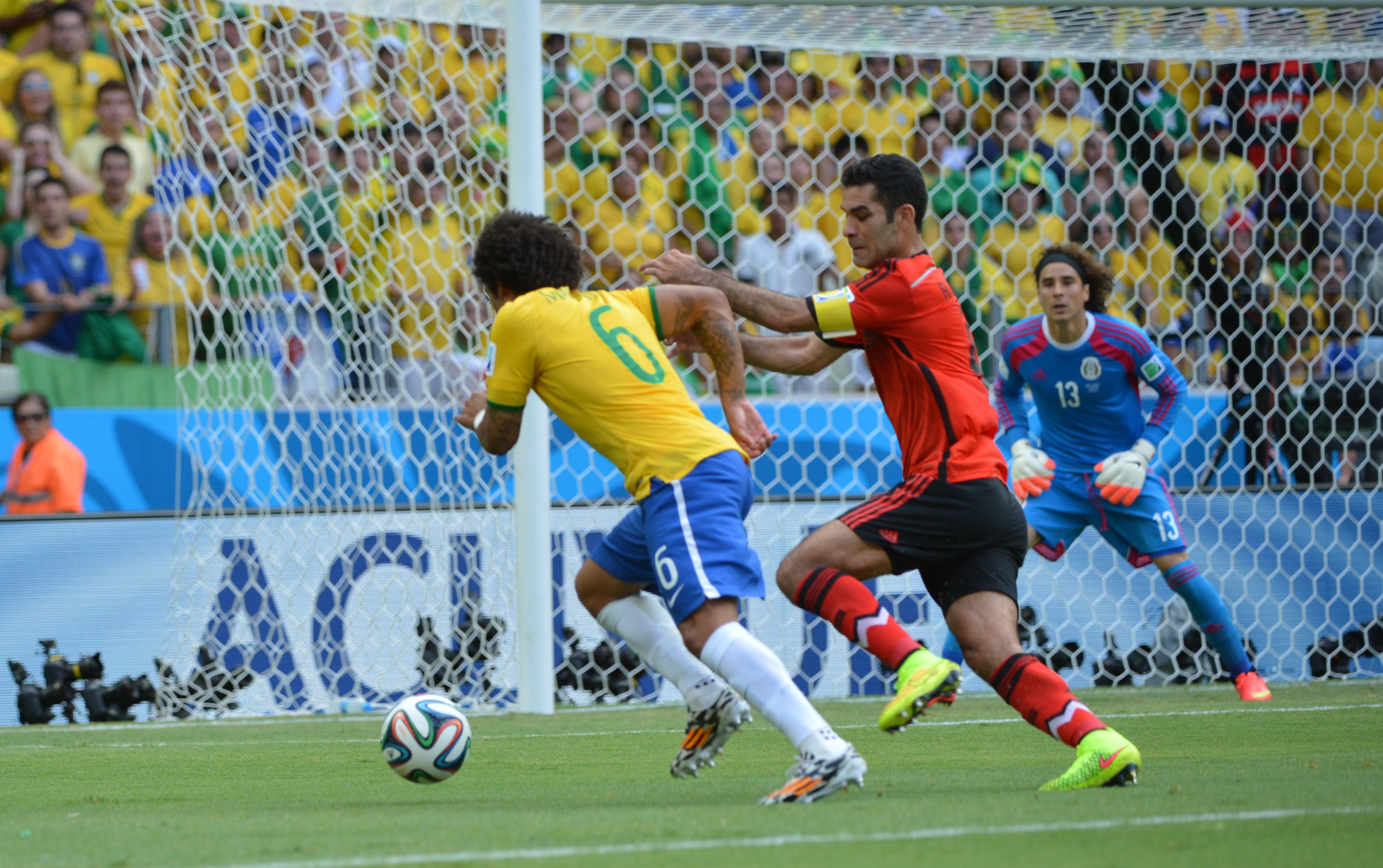
Marcelo taking on Rafael Márquez at the 2014 FIFA World Cup

Marcelo was praised by football legends such as Paolo Maldini and Diego Maradona, the latter of whom also called him the best left-back in the world. Marcelo has often been compared to fellow left-back Roberto Carlos, who himself described Marcelo as his heir in 2012. Carlos also commented on Marcelo's technical skills: "Marcelo possesses a better technical ability than me." Marcelo is widely regarded as one of the greatest left-backs of all time.

Known for his attacking capabilities, Marcelo mainly played as a full-back or wing-back, but he can also play on the left wing or in midfield. His movement on the ball, explosive pace, agility, and dribbling skills frequently see him beat opponents in one-on-one situations with feints. He is a threat on counter-attacks, as he can penetrate the opponent's defense with deep runs or get into positions where he can receive the ball often and create goals.

Moreover, his crossing ability, precise passing, and his vision also allow him to function as a secondary playmaker for his team, as he can create goalscoring chances for his teammates. While naturally left-footed, he is also adept with his right foot. (Note: See)

Despite his ability going forward, however, the defensive side of Marcelo's game has been brought into question by pundits on occasion, who have cited his defensive abilities, work-rate, and awareness as weaknesses that are in need of improvement.

== Football related business activities ==
In 2017, Marcelo started investing in football clubs with his company DOZE ("Twelve"). The company became a majority shareholder of Campeonato Paranaense club Azuriz based in Marmeleiro, Paraná. In 2021, DOZE invested in the Portuguese club Mafra. In October 2025, he would form his own club to compete in Kings League Spain known as Skull FC, alongside Twitch streamer Plex. Marcelo would also be on the team's inaugural roster.

== Personal life ==
In 2008, Marcelo married his longtime girlfriend Clarice Alves. On 24 September 2009, they had their first child, a son named Enzo Alves. Their second son, Liam, was born on 1 September 2015.

Marcelo has many tattoos, including his shirt number and his day of birth (12) tattooed, which are both on his left arm.

He mentioned his grandfather, Pedro Vieira, as the inspiration for his football career; his grandfather supported him financially so that he could start his career in Brazil. His grandfather died in July 2014, during the World Cup; Marcelo wanted to withdraw from the tournament to attend his funeral but stayed with the Brazil team to honor his grandfather's wishes.

On 26 July 2011, Marcelo attained Spanish nationality, which allows him to be registered as an EU player rather than as a non-EU player, of which there is a strict quota allowed.

== Sponsorship ==
In April 2013, Marcelo was unveiled as one of Adidas' new icons for a promotional event at the Bernabéu store which showcased the F50 adiZero. Marcelo was joined by Real Madrid teammates Gareth Bale and Karim Benzema, who also wore the Adidas brand. At the event, Marcelo said, "Throughout my career, I have achieved some of my dreams, and this is one too. Being next to these stars is fantastic. They have congratulated me, it's a great brand, and I am happy."

== Career statistics ==
=== Club ===
Appearances and goals by club, season and competition
Club	Season	League			State league (Note: Includes Campeonato Carioca)		National cup (Note: Includes Copa do Brasil, Copa del Rey, Greek Cup)		Continental		Other		Total	
Club	Season	Division	Apps	Goals	Apps	Goals	Apps	Goals	Apps	Goals	Apps	Goals	Apps	Goals
Fluminense	2005	Série A	1	0	—		—		—		—		1	0
Fluminense	2006	Série A	28	4	1	0	7	2	3 (Note: Appearances in Copa Sudamericana)	0	—		39	6
Fluminense	Total		29	4	1	0	7	2	3	0	—		40	6
Real Madrid	2006–07	La Liga	6	0	—		0	0	0	0	—		6	0
Real Madrid	2007–08	La Liga	24	0	—		2	0	6 (Note: Appearances in UEFA Champions League)	0	—		32	0
Real Madrid	2008–09	La Liga	27	4	—		2	0	5	0	—		34	4
Real Madrid	2009–10	La Liga	35	4	—		2	0	6	0	—		43	4
Real Madrid	2010–11	La Liga	32	3	—		6	0	12	2	—		50	5
Real Madrid	2011–12	La Liga	32	3	—		3	0	7	0	2 (Note: Appearance(s) in Supercopa de España)	0	44	3
Real Madrid	2012–13	La Liga	14	0	—		1	0	2	1	2	0	19	1
Real Madrid	2013–14	La Liga	28	1	—		4	0	7	1	—		39	2
Real Madrid	2014–15	La Liga	34	2	—		3	1	11	1	5 (Note: One appearance in UEFA Super Cup, two appearances in Supercopa de España, two appearances in FIFA Club World Cup)	0	53	4
Real Madrid	2015–16	La Liga	30	2	—		0	0	11	0	—		41	2
Real Madrid	2016–17	La Liga	30	2	—		3	1	11	0	3 (Note: One appearance in UEFA Super Cup, two appearances in FIFA Club World Cup)	0	47	3
Real Madrid	2017–18	La Liga	28	2	—		0	0	11	3	5	0	44	5
Real Madrid	2018–19	La Liga	23	2	—		4	0	4	1	3	0	34	3
Real Madrid	2019–20	La Liga	15	1	—		3	1	4	0	1	0	23	2
Real Madrid	2020–21	La Liga	16	0	—		1	0	2	0	—		19	0
Real Madrid	2021–22	La Liga	12	0	—		2	0	3	0	1	0	18	0
Real Madrid	Total		386	26	—		36	3	102	9	22	0	546	38
Olympiacos	2022–23	Super League Greece	5	0	—		2	3	3 (Note: Appearances in UEFA Europa League)	0	—		10	3
Fluminense	2023	Série A	19	1	1	1	2	0	8 (Note: Appearances in Copa Libertadores)	0	2 (Note: Appearances in FIFA Club World Cup)	0	32	2
Fluminense	2024	Série A	17	1	6	0	3	0	8	2	2 (Note: Appearances in Recopa Sudamericana)	0	36	3
Fluminense	Total		36	2	7	1	5	0	16	2	4	0	68	5
Career total			456	32	8	1	50	8	123	11	26	0	663	52

=== International ===
Appearances and goals by national team and year
National team	Year	Apps	Goals
Brazil
Brazil	2006	1	1
Brazil	2007	1	0
Brazil	2008	2	0
Brazil	2009	2	0
Brazil	2010	0	0
Brazil	2011	2	1
Brazil	2012	8	2
Brazil	2013	12	0
Brazil	2014	9	0
Brazil	2015	5	0
Brazil	2016	3	0
Brazil	2017	5	2
Brazil	2018	8	0
Total		58	6

Scores and results list Brazil's goal tally first:

List of international goals scored by Marcelo
No.	Date	Venue	Opponent	Score	Result	Competition
1	5 September 2006	White Hart Lane, London, England	Wales	2–0	2–0	Friendly
2	11 October 2011	Estadio Corona, Torreón, Mexico	Mexico	2–1	2–1	Friendly
3	28 February 2012	AFG Arena, St. Gallen, Switzerland	Bosnia and Herzegovina	1–0	2–1	Friendly
4	30 May 2012	FedExField, Landover, United States	United States	3–1	4–1	Friendly
5	27 March 2017	Arena Corinthians, São Paulo, Brazil	Paraguay	3–0	3–0	2018 FIFA World Cup qualification
6	10 November 2017	Stade Pierre-Mauroy, Villeneuve-d'Ascq, France	Japan	2–0	3–1	Friendly

== Honours ==
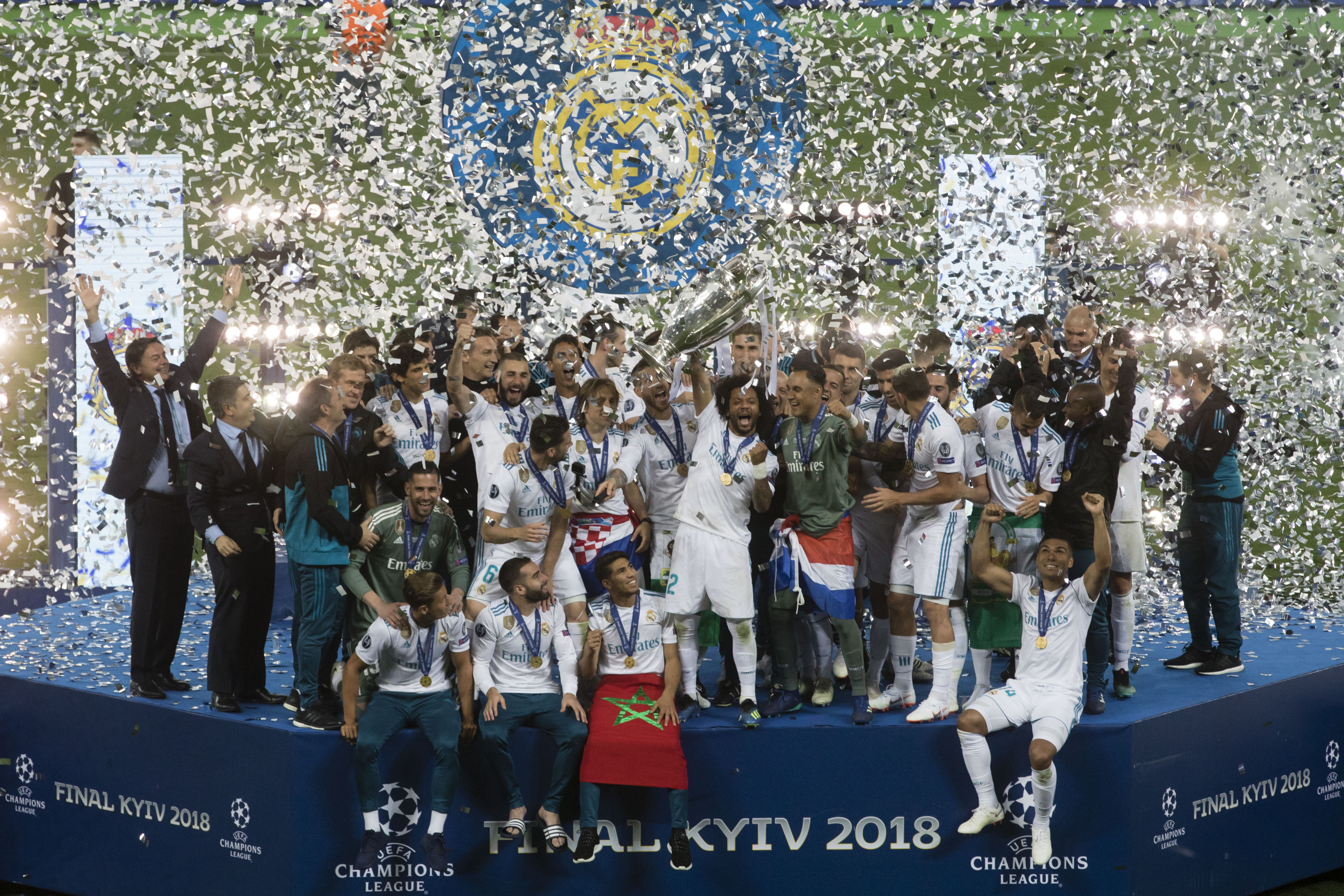
Marcelo hoisting the European Champion Clubs' Cup as Real Madrid celebrate winning the UEFA Champions League, on 26 May 2018

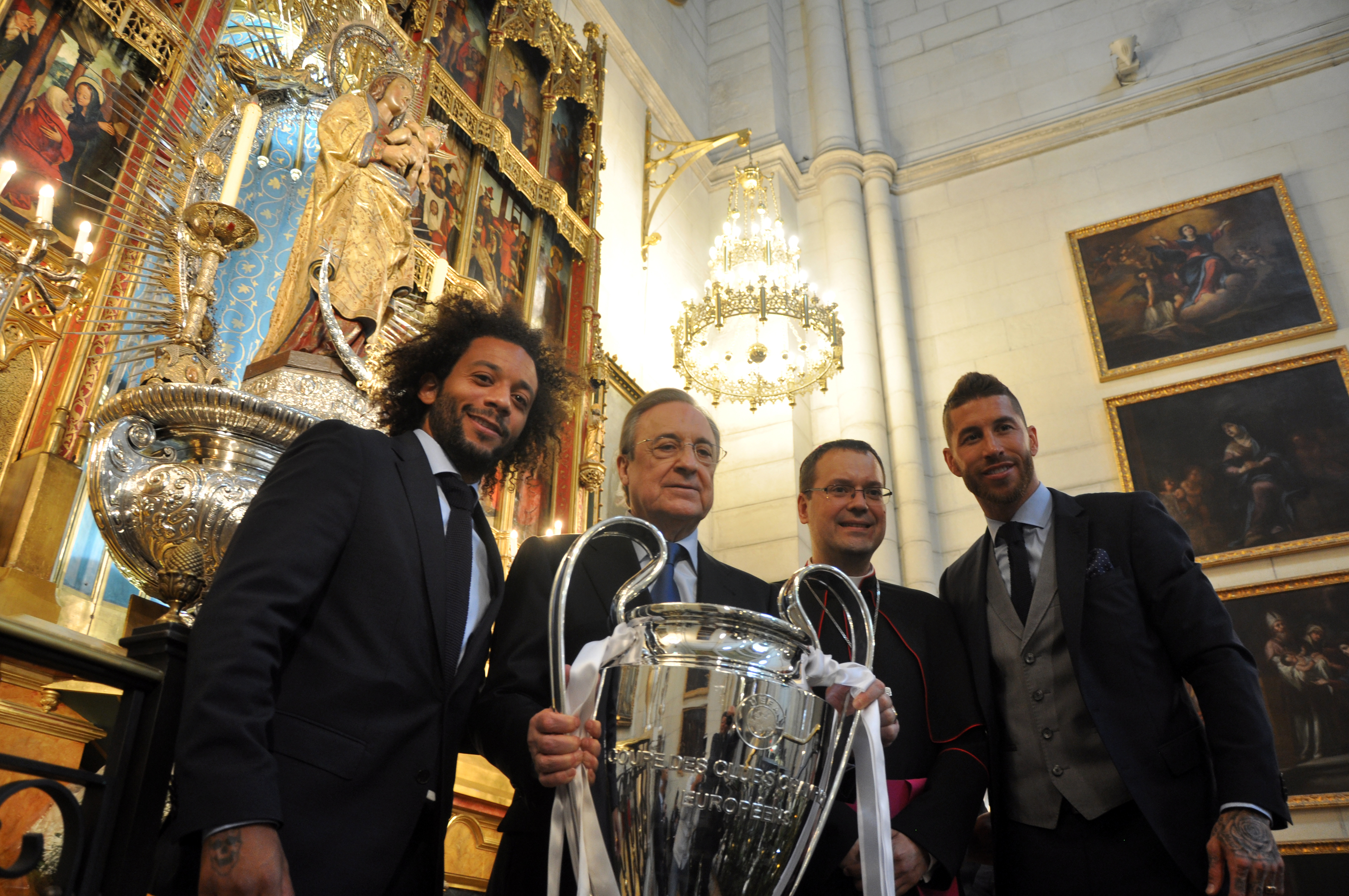
Marcelo celebrating after winning the 2018 UEFA Champions League Final

Fluminense

- Campeonato Carioca: 2005, 2023
- Taca Rio: 2005
- Copa Libertadores: 2023
- Recopa Sudamericana: 2024

Real Madrid

- La Liga: 2006–07, 2007–08, 2011–12, 2016–17, 2019–20, 2021–22
- Copa del Rey: 2010–11, 2013–14
- Supercopa de España: 2008, 2012, 2017, 2020, 2022
- UEFA Champions League: 2013–14, 2015–16, 2016–17, 2017–18, 2021–22
- UEFA Super Cup: 2014, 2016, 2017
- FIFA Club World Cup: 2014, 2016, 2017, 2018

Brazil U17

- FIFA U-17 World Cup runner-up: 2005

Brazil U23

- Summer Olympics silver medal: 2012; bronze medal: 2008

Brazil

- FIFA Confederations Cup: 2013

Individual

- Campeonato Brasileiro Série A Team of the Year: 2006
- France Football Team of the Decade (2010–2019)
- L'Équipe Team of the Season: 2011, 2016, 2017, 2018
- ESPN Best Left-back of the Year 2017, 2018
- UEFA Team of the Year: 2011, 2017, 2018
- FIFA FIFPRO World 11: 2012, 2015, 2016, 2017, 2018, 2019
- FIFA World Cup Dream Team: 2014, 2018
- La Liga Team of the Season: 2015–16
- Facebook FA La Liga Best Defender: 2016
- UEFA Champions League Squad of the Season: 2010–11, 2015–16, 2016–17, 2017–18
- ESM Team of the Year: 2015–16, 2016–17
- IFFHS Men's World Team: 2017, 2018
- IFFHS World Team of the Decade: 2011–2020
- IFFHS CONMEBOL Team of the Decade: 2011–2020

== See also ==
- List of footballers with 100 or more UEFA Champions League appearances

== Notes ==
Sporting positions
Preceded by Siphiwe Tshabalala	FIFA World Cup opening goal 2014 (own goal)	Succeeded by Yury Gazinsky
