= 2008 Supercopa de España =

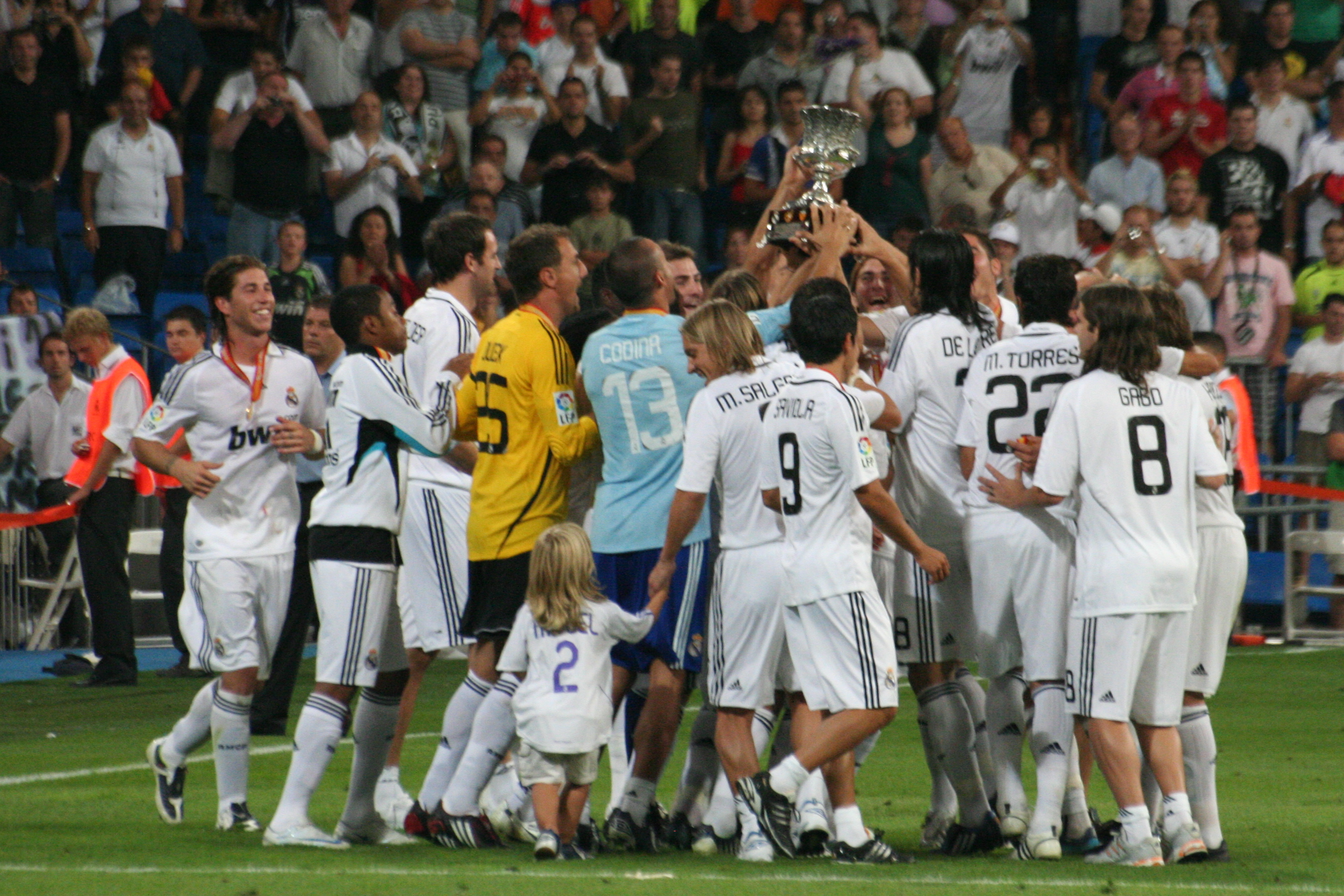
- Real Madrid players are celebrating for winning the 2008 Supercopa de España
- Event: Supercopa de España
Valencia	Real Madrid
5	6
- on aggregate

First leg
Valencia	Real Madrid
3	2
- Date: 17 August 2008
- Venue: Mestalla, Valencia
- Referee: Luis Medina Cantalejo
- Attendance: 35,000
- Weather: Clear; 25 °C (77 °F)

Second leg
Real Madrid	Valencia
4	2
- Date: 24 August 2008
- Venue: Santiago Bernabéu, Madrid
- Referee: Eduardo Iturralde González
- Attendance: 60,000
- Weather: Clear; 26 °C (79 °F)

The 2008 Supercopa de España was two-leg Spanish football matches played on 17 August and 24 August 2008. It was contested by Valencia, who were Spanish Cup winners in 2007–08, and Real Madrid, who won the 2007–08 La Liga. Real Madrid won 6–5 on aggregate for their record eighth Supercopa de España title.

== Match details ==
=== First leg ===
17 August 2008
22:05 CET

Valencia	3–2	Real Madrid
Mata 55'; Villa 58'; Vicente 80'	Report	Van Nistelrooy 13', 67'

Mestalla, Valencia
Attendance: 35,000
Referee: Luis Medina Cantalejo

Valencia	Real Madrid

GK	1	(Germany) Timo Hildebrand
RB	23	(Portugal) Miguel
CB	4	(Spain) Raúl Albiol
CB	20	(Spain) Alexis
LB	24	(Italy) Emiliano Moretti
CM	8	(Spain) Rubén Baraja (c)		(substituted off) 74'
CM	6	(Spain) David Albelda	(yellow card) 41'
RW	17	(Spain) Joaquín		(substituted off) 64'
AM	21	(Spain) David Silva
LW	16	(Spain) Juan Mata		(substituted off) 71'
CF	7	(Spain) David Villa	(yellow card) 23'
Substitutes:
GK	25	(Spain) Vicente Guaita
DF	15	(Spain) Iván Helguera
MF	12	(Portugal) Manuel Fernandes		(substituted on) 74'
MF	22	(Brazil) Edu
MF	11	(Spain) Pablo Hernández		(substituted on) 64'
MF	14	(Spain) Vicente		(substituted on) 71'
FW	9	(Spain) Fernando Morientes
Manager:
(Spain) Unai Emery

GK	1	(Spain) Iker Casillas
RB	2	(Spain) Míchel Salgado		(substituted off) 63'
CB	24	(Spain) Javi García	(yellow card) 50'
CB	16	(Argentina) Gabriel Heinze
LB	22	(Spain) Miguel Torres
CM	6	(Mali) Mahamadou Diarra
CM	18	(Spain) Rubén de la Red
RW	7	(Spain) Raúl (c)		(substituted off) 74'
AM	19	(Netherlands) Rafael van der Vaart
LW	10	(Brazil) Robinho		(substituted off) 63'
CF	17	(Netherlands) Ruud van Nistelrooy
Substitutes:
GK	25	(Poland) Jerzy Dudek
DF	21	(Germany) Christoph Metzelder
DF	4	(Spain) Sergio Ramos		(substituted on) 63'
MF	14	(Spain) Guti		(substituted on) 74'
MF	11	(Netherlands) Arjen Robben		(substituted on) 63'
FW	20	(Argentina) Gonzalo Higuaín
FW	9	(Argentina) Javier Saviola
Manager:
(Germany) Bernd Schuster

Assistant referees:

- Jesús Calvo Guadamuro
- Luis Alberto Gutiérrez Pérez

Fourth official:

- Domingo Palomino Núñez

=== Second leg ===
24 August 2008
22:00 CET

Real Madrid	4–2	Valencia
Van Nistelrooy 50' (pen.); Ramos 77'; De la Red 86'; Higuaín 89'	Report	Silva 32'; Morientes 90'

Santiago Bernabéu, Madrid
Attendance: 60,000
Referee: Eduardo Iturralde González

Real Madrid	Valencia

GK	1	(Spain) Iker Casillas
RB	4	(Spain) Sergio Ramos
CB	3	(Portugal) Pepe
CB	16	(Argentina) Gabriel Heinze	(yellow card) 72'
LB	22	(Spain) Miguel Torres		(substituted off) 63'
CM	6	(Mali) Mahamadou Diarra
CM	14	(Spain) Guti		(substituted off) 78'
RW	7	(Spain) Raúl (c)		(substituted off) 80'
AM	19	(Netherlands) Rafael van der Vaart	(red card) 39'
LW	11	(Netherlands) Arjen Robben
CF	17	(Netherlands) Ruud van Nistelrooy	(yellow card) 53' (yellow-red card) 72'
Substitutes:
GK	25	(Poland) Jerzy Dudek
DF	24	(Spain) Javi García
DF	12	(Brazil) Marcelo
MF	15	(Netherlands) Royston Drenthe		(substituted on) 63'
MF	18	(Spain) Rubén de la Red		(substituted on) 78'
FW	10	(Brazil) Robinho
FW	20	(Argentina) Gonzalo Higuaín		(substituted on) 80'
Manager:
(Germany) Bernd Schuster

GK	1	(Germany) Timo Hildebrand
RB	23	(Portugal) Miguel
CB	4	(Spain) Raúl Albiol	(yellow card) 48'	(substituted off) 81'
CB	20	(Spain) Alexis
LB	24	(Italy) Emiliano Moretti
CM	8	(Spain) Rubén Baraja
CM	6	(Spain) David Albelda (c)
RW	17	(Spain) Joaquín		(substituted off) 67'
AM	21	(Spain) David Silva
LW	16	(Spain) Juan Mata		(substituted off) 59'
CF	7	(Spain) David Villa
Substitutes:
GK	25	(Spain) Vicente Guaita
DF	15	(Spain) Iván Helguera
MF	12	(Portugal) Manuel Fernandes
MF	22	(Brazil) Edu
MF	11	(Spain) Pablo Hernández		(substituted on) 67'
MF	14	(Spain) Vicente		(substituted on) 59'
FW	9	(Spain) Fernando Morientes		(substituted on) 81'
Manager:
(Spain) Unai Emery

Assistant referees:

- Roberto Díaz Pérez del Palomar
- Jon Núñez Fernández

Fourth official:

- Jesús Rodríguez Cayetano

== See also ==
- 2008–09 La Liga
- 2008–09 Copa del Rey
- 2008–09 Real Madrid CF season
- 2008–09 Valencia CF season
