= Rubén de la Red =

Spanish footballer (born 1985)

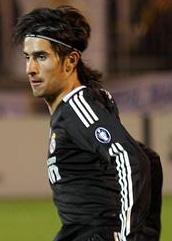
- De la Red with Real Madrid in 2008

Personal information
- Full name: Rubén de la Red Gutiérrez
- Date of birth: 5 June 1985 (age 41)
- Place of birth: Móstoles, Spain
- Height: 1.87 m (6 ft 2 in)
- Position: Central midfielder

Team information
- Current team: Racing Madrid (manager)

Youth career
- 1999–2004: Real Madrid

Senior career*
Years	Team	Apps	(Gls)
2004–2007	Real Madrid B	95	(14)
2005–2007	Real Madrid	10	(0)
2007–2008	Getafe	31	(2)
2008–2010	Real Madrid	7	(1)
Total		143	(17)

International career
2004–2006	Spain U19	4	(0)
2006–2008	Spain U21	5	(0)
2008	Spain	3	(1)

Managerial career
- 2012–2015: Real Madrid (youth)
- 2015–2016: Getafe B
- 2018–2019: Guangzhou Evergrande (youth)
- 2022–2025: Al-Nasr (youth)
- 2025–: Racing Madrid
Medal record
Representing Spain
UEFA European Championship
Winner	2008 Austria-Switzerland
- * Club domestic league appearances and goals

Rubén de la Red Gutiérrez (born 5 June 1985) is a Spanish former professional footballer who played as a central midfielder. He is currently manager of Racing Madrid.

He made a name for himself at Getafe after emerging through Real Madrid's La Fábrica. Returning to his first club in 2008, he suffered a serious heart ailment which put his career on hold for two years, until he retired in November 2010.

De la Red was part of Spain's victorious squad at the Euro 2008 tournament. He later worked briefly as a manager.

== Club career ==
=== Real Madrid ===
Born in Móstoles, Community of Madrid, de la Red arrived at the Real Madrid youth system when he was 14. At one point he was transferred to CD Móstoles after being told he was not good enough, but was soon re-signed by Madrid; after his fourth season youth coach Quique Sánchez Flores, who was moving to Getafe CF, wanted the player to join him at his new club, but Madrid turned him down.

De la Red made his first-team debut on 10 November 2004, in a 2–1 away win against CD Tenerife in the Copa del Rey. His first La Liga appearance came on 22 September 2005 when he played two minutes of the 3–1 home victory over Athletic Bilbao, and he appeared in two more games as a late substitute in that campaign.

In 2006–07, de la Red was called up to the main squad by manager Fabio Capello alongside Miguel Ángel Nieto and Miguel Torres, and he contributed seven matches to the league-winning season. On 9 November 2006 he scored his first goal with the main squad, closing the 5–1 home defeat of Écija Balompié in the domestic cup (6–2 aggregate); in July 2007, he renewed his contract until 2011.

=== Getafe ===
On 31 August 2007, de la Red was transferred to Madrid-based Getafe, with Real Madrid having an option to re-buy the next two years. There, he established himself as an important player, usually assuming the role of playmaker and being joined at the team by another Real Madrid canterano, Esteban Granero, who arrived on loan.

During the season, de la Red was forced due to injuries to teammates to perform as centre-back, notably in the UEFA Cup quarter-final tie against FC Bayern Munich, being sent off in the sixth minute of the second leg; in the continental competition he netted three times in 11 matches, notably in a 2–1 win at Tottenham Hotspur on 25 October 2007, equalising after a set piece combination with Granero.

=== Return home and retirement ===
Real Madrid president Ramón Calderón confirmed in May 2008 that, along with Granero and Javi García, de la Red would return to the Santiago Bernabéu Stadium for 2008–09. It was suggested that the latter could be used in a swap deal involving a number of potential targets, although coach Bernd Schuster stated that he was willing to give the midfielder a chance to impress in his team.

De la Red scored his first goal since returning on 24 August 2008, in the second leg of the Supercopa de España against Valencia CF, with a long-range effort, He added his first in the league – for Real – on 21 September, against Racing de Santander (2–0 away win).

On 30 October 2008, de la Red was hospitalized after fainting during a Spanish Cup game against Real Unión. He missed the rest of the season as a precaution, and subsequent media reports claimed he may never recover from his heart condition.

In late June 2009, after further tests proved inconclusive, de la Red missed the entire 2009–10, also being scheduled for tests every two months to monitor his situation. On 2 July, the club confirmed the news through its official website; after new Madrid signing Raúl Albiol was given the number 18 shirt, previously worn by de la Red, the former promised to give the shirt number back to the latter in the possibility he made a return.

In January 2010, it was reported in various Madrid-based news sites that Real Madrid were attempting to declare de la Red's heart problem to be "a common condition", and therefore find a way to annul his contract. As a consequence, the player would only receive a €1,500-monthly disability benefit, rather than the full wages due from the remaining two years of his link.

On 3 November 2010, de la Red announced his retirement from football at only 25. Prior to this announcement, he stated he would remain at the club as a youth coach. Director of football Jorge Valdano said that he would remain as part of José Mourinho's coaching staff.

== International career ==
De la Red played for Spain under-21s before being called up by the senior team for a friendly with Italy on 26 March 2008, but did not make his debut. Uncapped, he was named in the nation's squad of 22 for UEFA Euro 2008 by coach Luis Aragonés, but would appear in two exhibition games against Peru and the United States prior to the continental competition.

During the tournament's final group-stage match, de la Red scored his only international goal with a powerful strike against Greece on 18 June, for a 2–1 win.

== Coaching career ==
On 20 October 2015, de la Red was appointed manager of Getafe's reserves in the third tier. The team were relegated in his only season, and he left shortly afterwards.

In 2022, after youth spells at Guangzhou Evergrande FC in China and Al-Nasr SC (Dubai), de la Red began collaborating with the Racing City Group, often working for their franchise team Racing Dallas. On 1 July 2025, he was named head coach of Tercera Federación club Racing Madrid FC.

== Career statistics ==
=== Club ===
Appearances and goals by club, season and competition
Club	Season	League			Cup (Note: Includes Copa del Rey and Supercopa de España)		Europe (Note: Includes UEFA Champions League, UEFA Cup and UEFA Super Cup)		Total	
Club	Season	Division	Apps	Goals	Apps	Goals	Apps	Goals	Apps	Goals
Real Madrid	2004–05	La Liga	0	0	1	0	0	0	1	0
Real Madrid	2005–06	La Liga	3	0	0	0	2	0	5	0
Real Madrid	2006–07	La Liga	7	0	2	1	1	0	10	1
Real Madrid	Total		10	0	3	1	3	0	16	1
Getafe	2007–08	La Liga	31	2	7	3	11	3	49	8
Real Madrid	2008–09	La Liga	7	1	3	1	1	0	11	2
Real Madrid	2009–10	La Liga	0	0	0	0	0	0	0	0
Real Madrid	Total		7	1	3	1	1	0	11	2
Career total			48	3	13	5	15	3	76	11

=== International ===
Score and result list Spain's goal tally first, score column indicates score after de la Red goal.

International goal scored by Rubén de la Red
No.	Date	Venue	Opponent	Score	Result	Competition	Ref.
1	18 June 2008	Wals Siezenheim, Salzburg, Austria	Greece	1–1	2–1	UEFA Euro 2008	

== Managerial statistics ==
As of 15 May 2016

Team	From	To	Record				
Team	From	To	P	W	D	L	Win %
Getafe B	20 October 2015	16 June 2016	29	9	0	20	31.03
Career total			29	9	0	20	31.03

== Honours ==
Real Madrid

- La Liga: 2006–07
- Supercopa de España: 2008

Getafe

- Copa del Rey runner-up: 2007–08

Spain

- UEFA European Championship: 2008

Spain U19

- UEFA European Under-19 Championship: 2004
