= Miguel Torres (footballer, born 1986) =

Spanish footballer

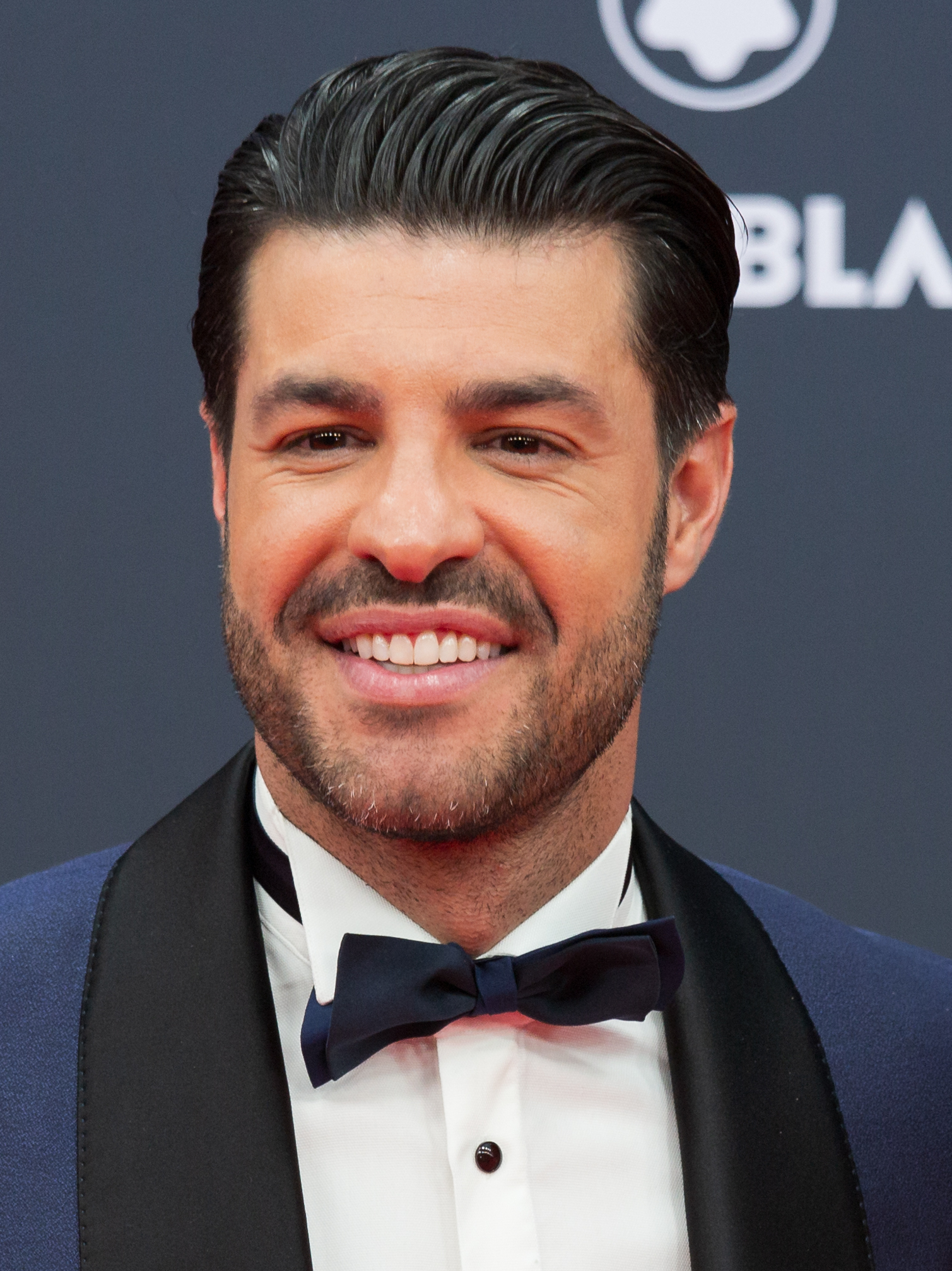
- Torres in 2024

Personal information
- Full name: Miguel Torres Gómez
- Date of birth: 28 January 1986 (age 40)
- Place of birth: Madrid, Spain
- Height: 1.85 m (6 ft 1 in)
- Position: Right-back

Youth career
- 1998–2005: Real Madrid

Senior career*
Years	Team	Apps	(Gls)
2005–2006	Real Madrid C	34	(1)
2006–2007	Real Madrid B	19	(0)
2006–2009	Real Madrid	52	(0)
2009–2013	Getafe	102	(1)
2013–2014	Olympiacos	10	(0)
2014–2019	Málaga	70	(0)
Total		287	(2)

International career
2007–2009	Spain U21	12	(0)
- * Club domestic league appearances and goals

Miguel Torres Gómez (Spanish pronunciation: [miˈɣel ˈtores]; born 28 January 1986) is a Spanish former professional footballer. Usually a right-back, he was equally at ease on the other flank.

He appeared in 223 La Liga matches over 11 seasons, in representation of Real Madrid, Getafe and Málaga. He also played in Greece with Olympiacos.

== Club career ==
=== Real Madrid ===
Born in Madrid, Torres joined Real Madrid's junior teams at the age of 12. He made his first-team debut against Écija as a starter, in a Copa del Rey game on 25 October 2006, because of injuries to defenders Fabio Cannavaro, Cicinho and Míchel Salgado. He also played in the return leg as a substitute after replacing Sergio Ramos in the 80th minute, and started in both cup matches against Real Betis.

Torres made his La Liga debut in his fourth consecutive appearance, playing the whole 90 minutes in the 1–0 home victory over Real Zaragoza on 14 January 2007. He kept his place in the side the following week against Mallorca, with that performance leading coach Fabio Capello to state: "It is not easy to find a player with as much personality and talent in attack and defence as Torres".

On 10 February 2007, against Real Sociedad, Torres made his first assist: after a quick run on the left flank he provided a left-footed (he was right-footed by nature) cross for Ruud van Nistelrooy, whose header found the net as Madrid came from behind to win it away 2–1.

With Torres as an important piece, Real Madrid won their 30th league title; however, he was unable to play in the decisive game with Mallorca due to a hamstring tear. He signed his first professional contract on 12 July 2007, joining the main squad permanently from Real Madrid Castilla.

Although Torres appeared in more league matches in the following season, he would start significantly less as Madrid repeated league honours, primarily due to the signing of Argentine Gabriel Heinze. During the 2008–09 campaign, still under Bernd Schuster first and later Juande Ramos, he did not fare any better.

=== Getafe ===
On 31 August 2009 – transfer deadline day – Torres moved to neighbours Getafe on a five-year contract, with Real having the option to rebuy in the first two. He made 26 appearances in his first season, with qualification to the UEFA Europa League after a sixth-place finish.

Torres was challenged by new signing Juan Valera for the right-back position in the 2011–12 season, under new manager Luis García, but still contributed 23 league matches as the Madrid outskirts team again retained their status. On 16 April 2012, he scored his only goal in the top division, opening a 5–1 home defeat of Sevilla.

=== Olympiacos and Málaga ===
On 9 August 2013, Torres joined Olympiacos in Greece on a three-year deal worth a reported €500,000, reuniting with Míchel who also coached him at Getafe and Real Madrid Castilla. After only ten competitive games, he returned to Spain's top flight a year later, signing a one-year contract at Málaga with the option of two more.

During his later spell at the La Rosaleda Stadium, Torres suffered several injury problems and was also deemed surplus to requirements by manager Juan Ramón López Muñiz. On 4 July 2019, the 33-year-old announced his retirement from football.

== International career ==
Torres made his debut for the Spain under-21 team on 6 February 2007 in a 2–2 draw against England, remaining a regular in subsequent fixtures.

== Personal life ==
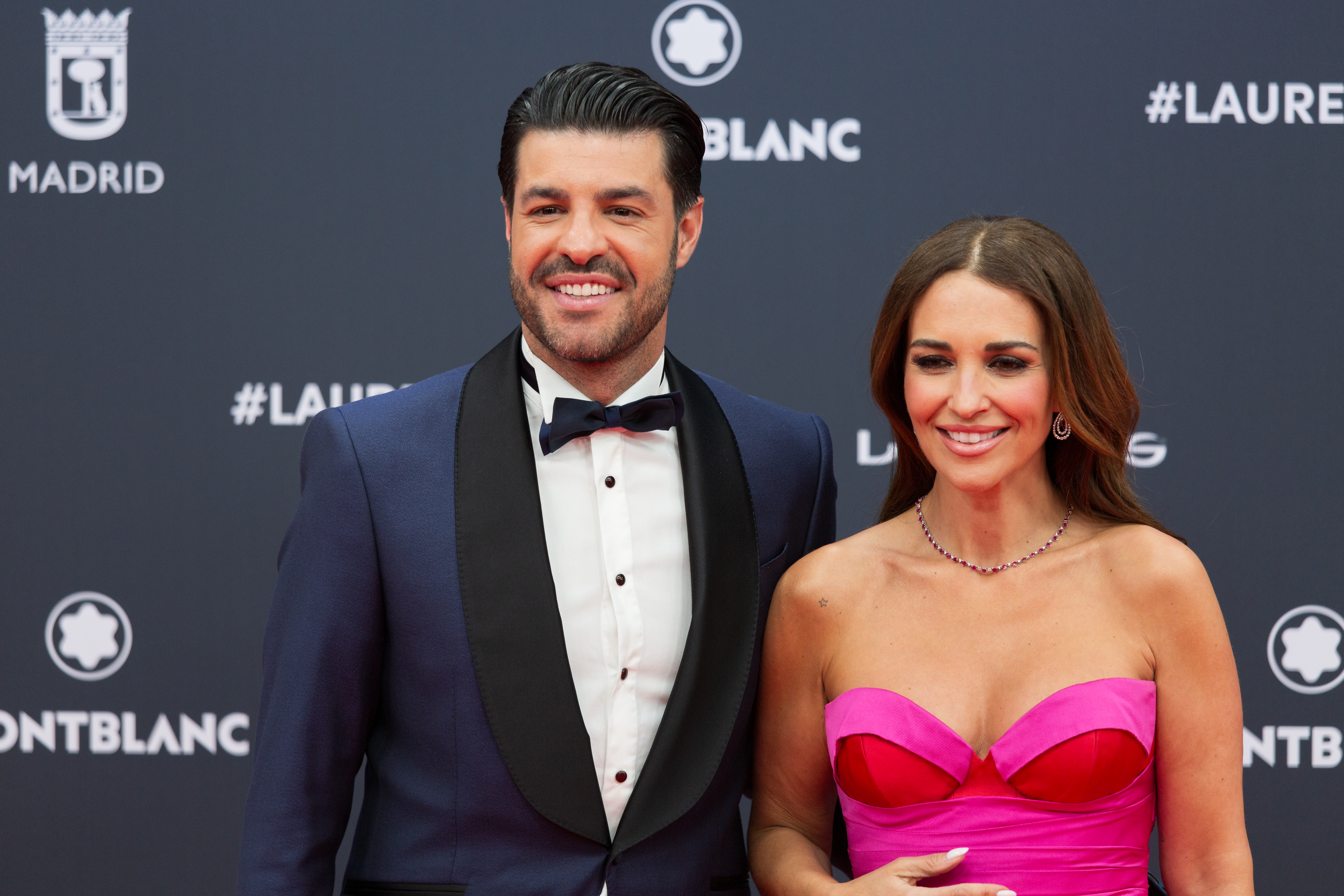
Torres and Echevarría in 2024

In 2021, Torres and actress Paula Echevarría became parents to a son, also named Miguel. The couple took part together on the third season of Mask Singer: Adivina quién canta, won by fellow Real Madrid veteran Fernando Morientes.

== Career statistics ==
Appearances and goals by club, season and competition
Club	Season	League			Cup		Europe		Other		Total	
Club	Season	Division	Apps	Goals	Apps	Goals	Apps	Goals	Apps	Goals	Apps	Goals
Real Madrid B	2006–07	Segunda División	19	0	0	0	0	0	—		19	0
Real Madrid	2006–07	La Liga	18	0	4	0	3	0	—		25	0
Real Madrid	2007–08	La Liga	20	0	3	0	3	0	2	0	28	0
Real Madrid	2008–09	La Liga	14	0	0	0	1	0	2	0	17	0
Real Madrid	Total		52	0	7	0	7	0	4	0	70	0
Getafe	2009–10	La Liga	26	0	5	0	0	0	—		31	0
Getafe	2010–11	La Liga	32	0	2	0	5	0	—		39	0
Getafe	2011–12	La Liga	23	1	0	0	0	0	—		23	1
Getafe	2012–13	La Liga	21	0	4	0	0	0	—		25	0
Getafe	Total		102	1	11	0	5	0	—		118	1
Olympiacos	2013–14	Super League Greece	10	0	0	0	0	0	—		10	0
Málaga	2014–15	La Liga	16	0	3	0	0	0	—		19	0
Málaga	2015–16	La Liga	23	0	1	0	0	0	—		24	0
Málaga	2016–17	La Liga	22	0	1	0	0	0	—		23	0
Málaga	2017–18	La Liga	8	0	0	0	0	0	—		8	0
Málaga	2018–19	Segunda División	1	0	0	0	0	0	—		1	0
Málaga	Total		70	0	5	0	0	0	—		75	0
Career total			253	1	23	0	12	0	4	0	292	1

== Honours ==
Real Madrid

- La Liga: 2006–07, 2007–08
- Supercopa de España: 2008; runner-up: 2007

Olympiacos

- Super League Greece: 2013–14
