= Vicente Boluda =

Spanish businessman and lawyer

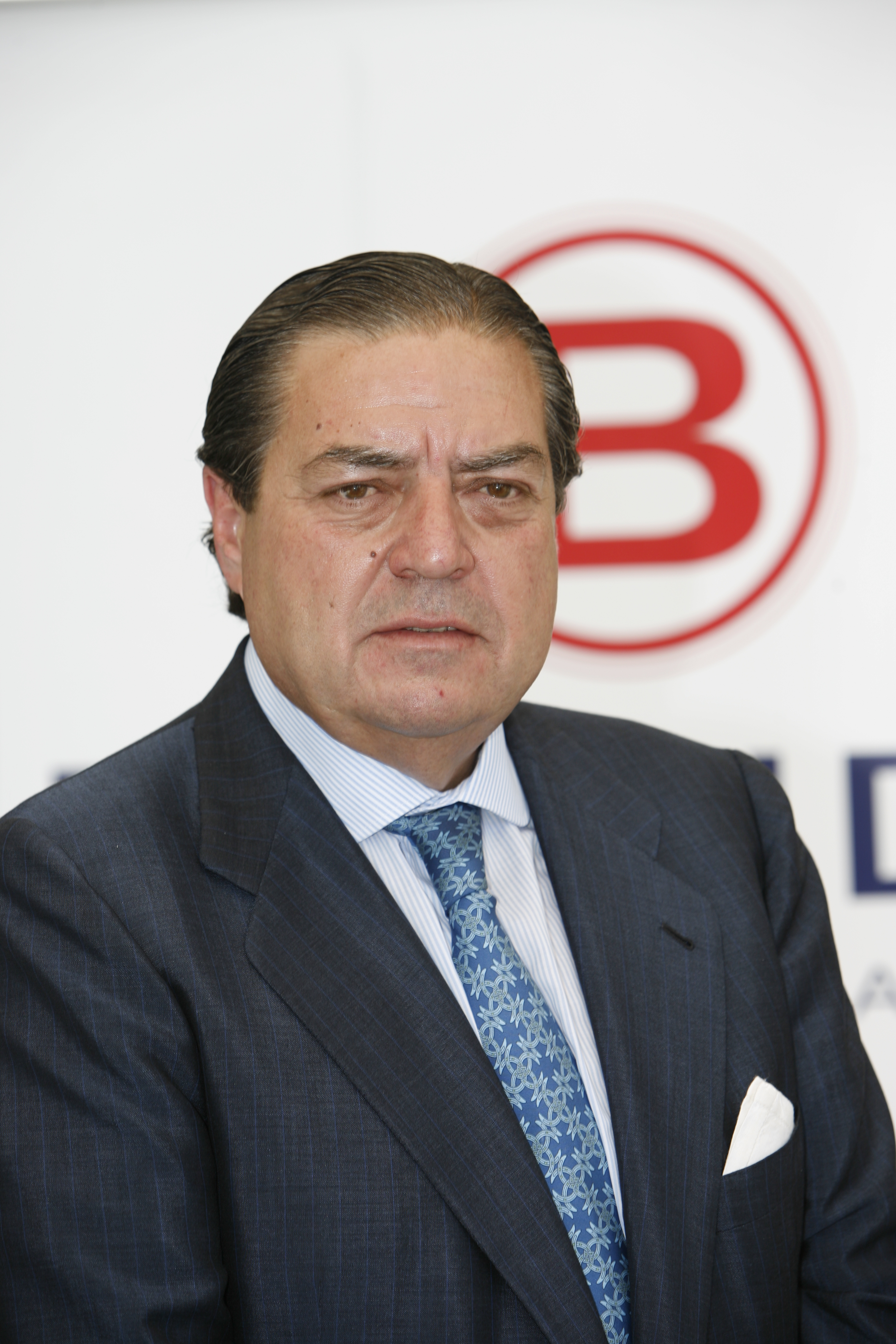
- Boluda in 2009

17th President of Real Madrid
- In office 16 January 2009 – 31 May 2009
- Preceded by: Ramón Calderón
- Succeeded by: Florentino Pérez

Personal details
- Born: 31 March 1955 (age 71) Valencia, Spain
- Occupation: Businessman, lawyer

Vicente Boluda Fos (born 31 March 1955) is a Spanish businessman and lawyer who was the 17th President of Real Madrid from 16 January 2009 until 31 May 2009.

== Life and career ==
Boluda has two master's degrees, one in legal advice for business and other in admiralty law. He is the president of the National Association of Shipowners and Tugboats, a delegate in the Upper Counsel of the Chambers of Commerce, the first vice-president of the Chamber of Commerce, Industry and Navigation of Valencia, and vice-president of the Spanish Shipping Association. In 1998, he received the Enterpriser of the Year award for his work in the Boluda Group, defeating rivals such as IBM and la Caixa.

Boluda is a member of the Advisory Board of the Centesimus Annus Pro Pontifice (CAPP), a papal foundation.

== Career at Real Madrid ==
Boluda rose through the ranks at Real Madrid, becoming a part of the board directors when Ramón Calderón was elected club president in 2006. In less than a year, he was named as vice-president, after Juan Mendoza resigned following a disagreement regarding the basketball side of the club. Boluda became president of the club on 16 January 2009 after Calderón resigned. Finally, on 1 June 2009, Boluda finished his career leading Real Madrid to let Florentino Pérez take charge.
