= Gabriel Heinze =

Argentine footballer (born 1978)

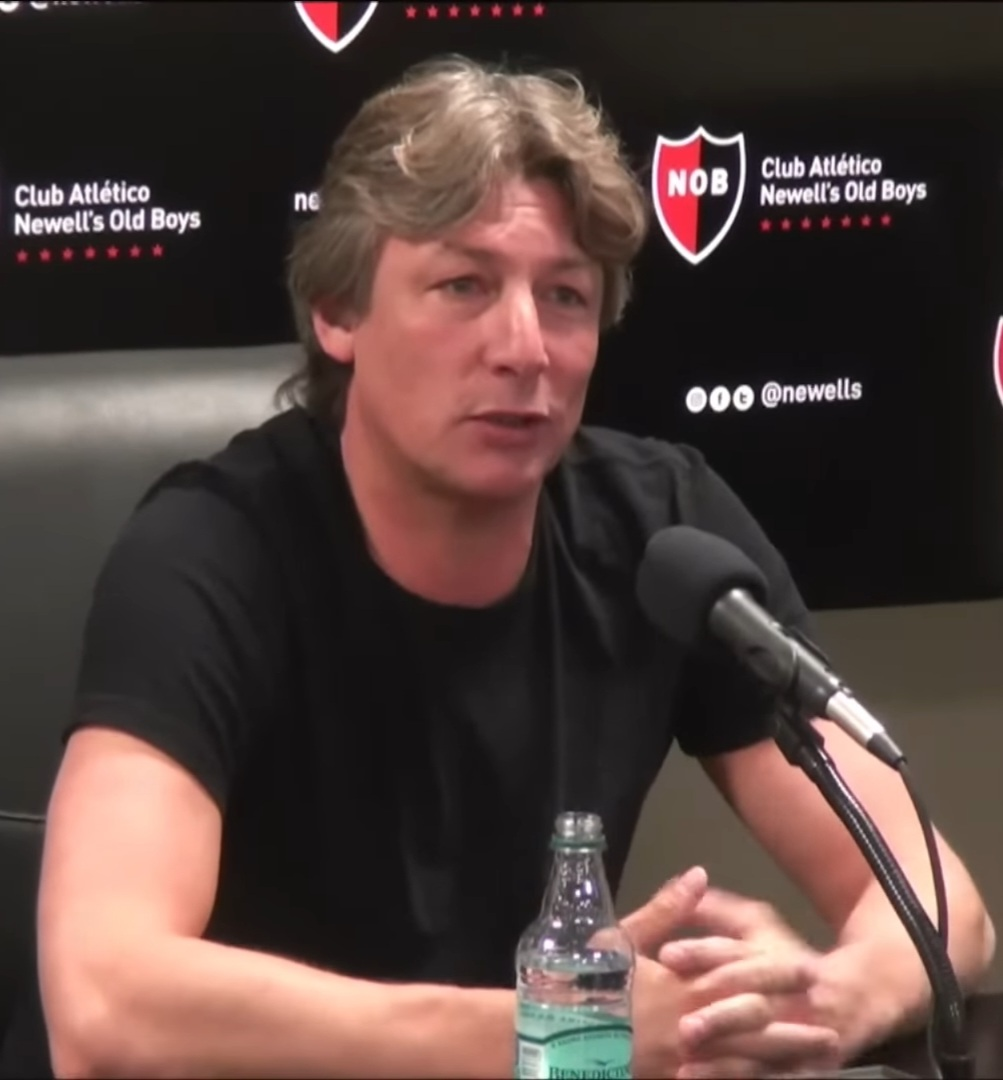
- Heinze in 2022

Personal information
- Full name: Gabriel Iván Heinze
- Date of birth: 19 April 1978 (age 48)
- Place of birth: Crespo, Argentina
- Height: 1.78 m (5 ft 10 in)
- Position: Defender

Team information
- Current team: Arsenal (first team coach)

Senior career*
Years	Team	Apps	(Gls)
1996–1997	Newell's Old Boys	1	(0)
1997–2001	Valladolid	54	(1)
1998–1999	→ Sporting CP (loan)	5	(1)
2001–2004	Paris Saint-Germain	99	(4)
2004–2007	Manchester United	52	(1)
2007–2009	Real Madrid	44	(3)
2009–2011	Marseille	58	(7)
2011–2012	Roma	30	(0)
2012–2014	Newell's Old Boys	54	(3)
Total		397	(20)

International career
2004	Argentina Olympic	6	(1)
2003–2010	Argentina	72	(3)

Managerial career
- 2015: Godoy Cruz
- 2016–2017: Argentinos Juniors
- 2017–2020: Vélez Sarsfield
- 2020–2021: Atlanta United
- 2022–2023: Newell's Old Boys
Medal record
Representing Argentina
Men's Football
Olympic Games
Gold medal – first place	2004 Athens	Team
Copa América
Runner-up	2004 Peru
Runner-up	2007 Venezuela
FIFA Confederations Cup
Runner-up	2005 Germany	Team
- * Club domestic league appearances and goals

Gabriel Iván Heinze (Spanish pronunciation: [ɡaˈβɾjel ˈxejnse]; born 19 April 1978) is an Argentine football coach and former player who is currently a first team coach at Premier League club Arsenal. As a player, he operated as a defender, either as a left-back or a centre-back.

Nicknamed Gringo, he made a name for himself at Paris Saint-Germain, moving in 2004 to Manchester United and subsequently to Real Madrid, winning three trophies in total with the latter two clubs. He started and finished his 18-year professional career with Newell's Old Boys.

Heinze played 72 times for the Argentina national team, including at two FIFA World Cup and two Copa América tournaments. In 2015, he began working as a manager, leading four teams in the Argentine Primera División.

== Club career ==
=== Early career ===
Heinze was born in Crespo, Entre Ríos to a father of Volga German descent and a mother of Italian descent, thus also holding an Italian and a German passport. He began his career in his home country with Newell's Old Boys and, following attention from various European clubs, the 19-year-old signed for Real Valladolid in Spain, not managing one single La Liga appearance in his first season and also being loaned to Sporting CP in December 1998.

After the 2000–01 campaign, where he appeared in 36 league games to help the Castile and León side narrowly avoid top flight relegation, Heinze moved to Paris Saint-Germain, where he amassed over 100 overall appearances in three years, helping to the 2004 conquest of the Coupe de France.

=== Manchester United ===
In June 2004, Heinze joined Manchester United for a fee of £6.9million. He marked his debut on 11 September with a goal in a 2–2 away draw against Bolton Wanderers, and immediately established himself as first-choice left-back, being regularly lauded by fans with the chant of "Ar-gen-tina!" and eventually voted the club's best player for the 2004–05 season.

On 14 September 2005, Heinze was injured in a UEFA Champions League match with Villarreal and was ruled out of first-team action for the rest of the campaign. Previously, he had scored two goals in the same competition, the 3–0 second-leg qualifier away win over Debreceni. He made a comeback with the reserve team in April 2006, but a minor injury picked up in his third game back prevented him from making a first-team appearance before the end of the season. The consequence of this injury was the signing of Patrice Evra, who went on to become the club's first-choice left-back in the following years.

Heinze returned to action for United in 2006–07, and eventually won a place in the side back as a central defender, due to an injury crisis. After the team had sealed the Premier League title, he was named captain for the last two games of the season, away to Chelsea and at home to West Ham United.

After becoming disillusioned with manager Alex Ferguson by his lack of regular first-team action, Heinze demanded a transfer to Liverpool during the close season. United rejected the bid, believed to be in the region of £6.8 million.

=== Real Madrid ===
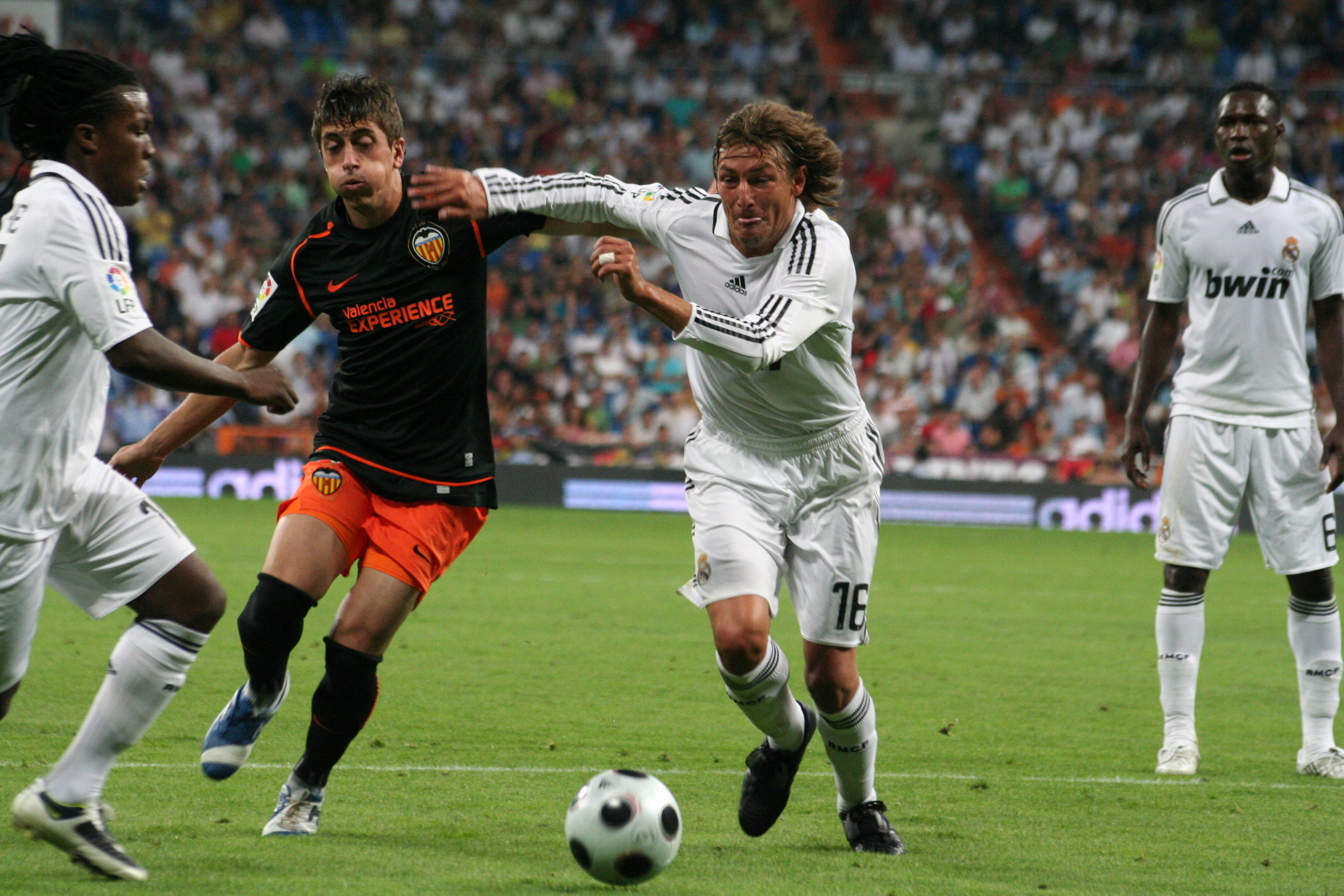
Heinze playing with Real Madrid against Valencia in 2009

On 22 August 2007, Heinze joined Real Madrid on a four-year deal, becoming the third United player to join the Spaniards (after David Beckham and Ruud van Nistelrooy), for a reported £8 million fee. He made his debut on 2 September against Villarreal, coming on as a substitute for Raúl. On 30 March 2008, he netted his first goal for the Merengues, in a 3–1 home win over Sevilla, and finished his debut season with 20 appearances to help win the league.

Heinze was more regularly used in his second year at the Santiago Bernabéu, but the club came out empty in silverware, with the exception of that year's Supercopa de España.

=== Marseille ===
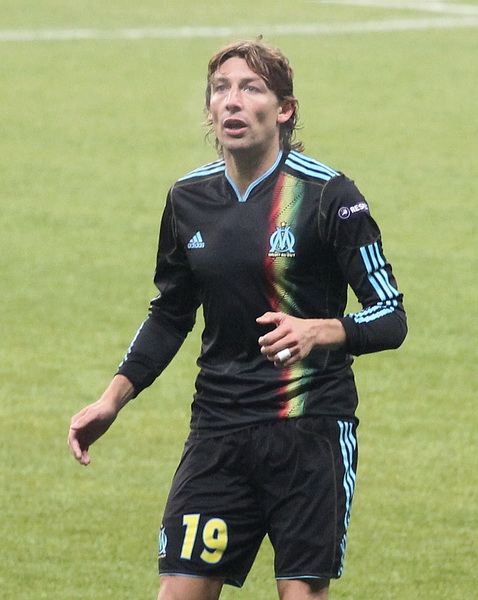
Heinze in action for Marseille (2010)

On 30 July 2009, Heinze joined Marseille on a two-year deal for an undisclosed fee, reuniting at the Ligue 1 club with countryman Lucho González. In his first year he scored a career-best four league goals in 27 matches, as L'OM won both the national championship and the season's Coupe de la Ligue. On 27 March 2010 he was a starter as his team defeated Bordeaux in the latter competition's final, for Marseille's first major title since 1993; on 5 May, he netted the opener in a 3–1 home win against Rennes, which clinched the league. Manager Didier Deschamps later described the season's events as an "extraordinary human adventure".

Heinze was again a defensive stalwart in the 2010–11 season. On 20 March 2011, he scored from a free kick to help defeat his former club PSG 2–1 at home in the Clasico.

On 1 June 2011, it was announced on Marseille's website that 33-year-old Heinze would leave the club at the end of the season.

=== Later years ===
Heinze joined Serie A side Roma on 22 July 2011, after being released by Marseille at the end of June. He made his competitive debut on 11 September, in a 1–2 home loss against Cagliari.

On 19 March 2012, after appearing in his 25th official game, Heinze had his contract automatically renewed for another year. However, just five months later, it was announced on Roma's official website that he was being released from his contract with immediate effect; the day after his release he joined his original club, Newell's Old Boys, on a two-year deal.

== International career ==
Heinze first represented Argentina on 30 April 2003, in a friendly away win with Libya. The following year, he was selected as one of the three overage players then Argentina U23 won the gold medal at the 2004 Summer Olympics. He scored in a 6–0 win over Serbia and Montenegro in the group stage.

Despite missing most of 2005–06 with Manchester United due to injury, Heinze was called up for the 2006 FIFA World Cup finals in Germany. In the quarter-final clash against the hosts, he started as Argentina lost on penalties.

Heinze participated in the 2007 Copa América, scoring with his head from a Juan Román Riquelme free kick in the semi-finals against Mexico, a 3–0 win for the eventual runners-up. In the 2010 FIFA World Cup he played in four of Argentina's five matches in South Africa, netting the game's only goal – his third international – in a group stage victory over Nigeria.

== Coaching career ==
=== Early years ===
Even though he still did not possess the proper license, Heinze began working as a manager in June 2015, being appointed at Godoy Cruz in the Argentine Primera División. On 12 July, he won 3–0 at home to Crucero del Norte on his debut. He was sacked on 27 September, following two wins, two draws and six defeats.

Heinze signed at Argentinos Juniors in June 2016. In July of the following year, after achieving top-level promotion, he resigned.

On 11 December 2017, Heinze was appointed at Vélez Sarsfield. Having led the team to two consecutive Copa Sudamericana qualifications, he chose not to continue past the end of the 2019–20 season.

=== Atlanta United ===
On 18 December 2020, Heinze was named manager of Major League Soccer club Atlanta United on a two-year contract. On his debut the following 6 April, the side won by one goal away to Alajuelense of Costa Rica, in the last-16 first leg of the CONCACAF Champions League.

Heinze banished Atlanta's star striker Josef Martínez from training, and publicly said that this was his own decision, rather than a precaution based on the Venezuelan's COVID-19 diagnosis at the 2021 Copa América. On 18 July that year, having won just twice in 13 games, he was dismissed from his job.

=== Newell's Old Boys ===
On 25 October 2022, Heinze was hired by Newell's, having rejected an offer from the club the previous December. His team were knocked out in the last 64 of the Copa Argentina on 22 February, 1–0 at home to fourth-tier Claypole. He left after one year at the club, in which they had a mid-table league finish and elimination from the last 16 of the Copa Sudamericana by Corinthians.

=== Arsenal ===
On 8 July 2025, Arsenal announced the appointment of Heinze as a first-team coach.

== Personal life ==
Heinze was named in the Panama Papers, a 2016 leak of offshore accounts used for tax evasion. In 2005, he signed an endorsement with Puma, in which at least a million dollars was paid to him over a period of five years through an account in his mother's name in the British Virgin Islands.

An urban myth, published in sources including UEFA's website, suggested that Heinze was a member of Y Wladfa, the Welsh-speaking colony in Patagonia. This was proven false by a Manchester United spokeswoman.

== Career statistics ==
=== Club ===
Appearances and goals by club, season and competition
Club	Season	League			National cup		League cup		Continental		Total	
Club	Season	Division	Apps	Goals	Apps	Goals	Apps	Goals	Apps	Goals	Apps	Goals
Newell's Old Boys	1996–97	Primera División	1	0	–		–		0	0	1	0
Valladolid	1997–98	La Liga	0	0	0	0	–		–		0	0
Valladolid	1998–99	La Liga	0	0	0	0	–		–		0	0
Valladolid	1999–2000	La Liga	18	0	1	0	–		–		19	0
Valladolid	2000–01	La Liga	36	1	1	0	–		–		37	1
Valladolid	Total		54	1	2	0	0	0	0	0	56	1
Sporting CP (loan)	1998–99	Primeira Liga	5	1	0	0	–		0	0	5	1
Paris Saint-Germain	2001–02	Ligue 1	31	0	4	1	3	0	10	1	48	2
Paris Saint-Germain	2002–03	Ligue 1	35	2	6	0	1	1	4	0	46	3
Paris Saint-Germain	2003–04	Ligue 1	33	2	5	1	0	0	0	0	38	3
Paris Saint-Germain	Total		99	4	15	2	4	1	14	1	132	8
Manchester United	2004–05	Premier League	26	1	4	0	2	0	7	0	39	1
Manchester United	2005–06	Premier League	4	0	0	0	0	0	2	2	6	2
Manchester United	2006–07	Premier League	22	0	6	1	2	0	8	0	38	1
Manchester United	Total		52	1	10	1	4	0	17	2	83	4
Real Madrid	2007–08	La Liga	20	1	2	0	0	0	4	0	26	1
Real Madrid	2008–09	La Liga	24	2	1	0	2	0	7	0	34	2
Real Madrid	Total		44	3	3	0	2	0	11	0	60	3
Marseille	2009–10	Ligue 1	27	4	0	0	2	0	7	2	36	6
Marseille	2010–11	Ligue 1	31	3	1	0	1	0	8	1	41	4
Marseille	Total		58	7	1	0	3	0	15	3	77	10
Roma	2011–12	Serie A	30	0	2	0	–		0	0	32	0
Newell's Old Boys	2012–13	Primera División	27	1	0	0	0	0	10	0	37	1
Newell's Old Boys	2013–14	Primera División	27	2	0	0	0	0	4	0	31	2
Newell's Old Boys	Total		54	3	0	0	0	0	14	0	68	3
Career total			397	20	33	3	13	1	71	6	514	30

=== International ===
Appearances and goals by national team and year
National team	Year	Apps	Goals
Argentina	2003	4	0
Argentina	2004	14	0
Argentina	2005	10	1
Argentina	2006	5	0
Argentina	2007	9	1
Argentina	2008	9	0
Argentina	2009	11	0
Argentina	2010	10	1
Total		72	3

Scores and results list Argentina's goal tally first, score column indicates score after each Heinze goal.

List of international goals scored by Gabriel Heinze
No.	Date	Venue	Opponent	Score	Result	Competition	Ref.
1	17 August 2005	Ferenc Puskás, Budapest, Hungary	Hungary	2–1	2–1	Friendly	
2	11 July 2007	Polideportivo Cachamay, Puerto Ordaz, Venezuela	Mexico	1–0	3–0	2007 Copa América	
3	12 June 2010	Ellis Park, Johannesburg, South Africa	Nigeria	1–0	1–0	2010 FIFA World Cup	

== Managerial statistics ==
As of match played 27 November 2023

Managerial record by team and tenure
Team	From	To	Record							
Team	From	To	G	W	D	L	GF	GA	GD	Win %
Godoy Cruz	11 June 2015	27 September 2015	10	2	2	6	9	14	−5	20.00
Argentinos Juniors	20 June 2016	1 August 2017	46	25	14	7	62	26	+36	54.35
Vélez Sarsfield	11 December 2017	9 March 2020	71	31	22	18	90	63	+27	43.66
Atlanta United	18 December 2020	18 July 2021	17	4	8	5	16	20	−4	23.53
Newell's Old Boys	25 October 2022	27 November 2023	50	18	16	16	50	41	+9	36.00
Total			194	80	62	52	227	164	+63	41.24

== Honours ==
=== Player ===
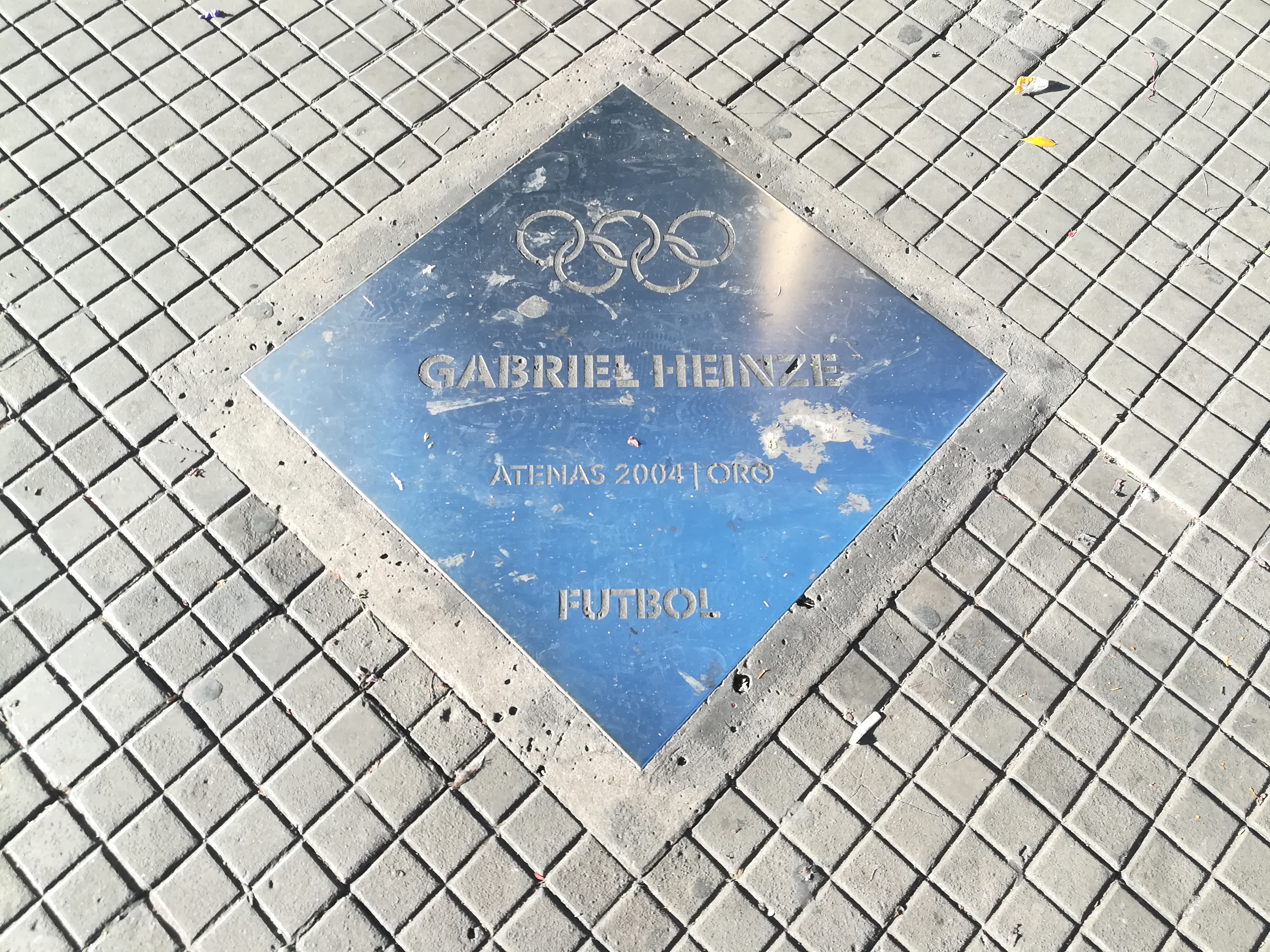
Tile in Rosario commemorating Heinze's gold medal win with Argentina at the 2004 Olympic football tournament.

Paris Saint-Germain

- UEFA Intertoto Cup: 2001

Manchester United

- Premier League: 2006–07

Real Madrid

- La Liga: 2007–08
- Supercopa de España: 2008

Marseille

- Ligue 1: 2009–10
- Coupe de la Ligue: 2009–10, 2010–11

Newell's Old Boys

- Argentine Primera División: 2013 Final

Argentina Olympic

- Summer Olympic Games: 2004

Argentina

- Copa América runner-up: 2004, 2007
- FIFA Confederations Cup runner-up: 2005

Individual

- Sir Matt Busby Player of the Year: 2004–05

=== Manager ===
Argentinos Juniors

- Primera B Nacional: 2016–17

=== Assistant Manager ===
- Premier League: 2025-26
