= Saravia (disambiguation) =

Saravia was the name of the defunct Russian airline Saratov Airlines until 2013.

Saravia is the Hispanicized version of the Portuguese surname Saraiva. Notable people with the surname Saravia include:

- Aparicio Saravia (1956–1904), Uruguayan political leader
- Villanueva Saravia (1968–1998), Uruguayan politician
- Victoria Saravia (born 1986), Uruguayan model and media personality

Saravia may also refer to:

- Hadrian à Saravia (1532-1613), Dutch-British Protestant theologian

== See also ==
- Saraiva
