= Portuguese Uruguayans =

Uruguayans of Portuguese birth or descent

Portuguese Uruguayans Luso-uruguaianos
Total population
- 380,000

Regions with significant populations
- Colonia de Sacramento

Languages
- Spanish, Uruguayan Portuguese, Portuñol

Religion
- Predominantly Latin Catholicism

Related ethnic groups
- Brazilians in Uruguay, Spanish Uruguayans, Italian Uruguayans

Portuguese Uruguayans are Uruguayans of full or partial Portuguese ancestry, many of whom are of Azorean descent.

The Portuguese arrived in Uruguay around the time of the Spanish colonial period. Many of them were sailors, conquistadors, clergy, and members of the military. Later Portuguese arrivals included pirates in conflict with Spanish leadership; Colonia del Sacramento, established by the Portuguese in 1680, which eventually turned into a regional center of smuggling, is a notable example of those ages.

Another source of Portuguese immigration into Uruguay were Brazilians of Portuguese descent, who crossed the border into the country ever since it became independent.

During the second half of the 19th century and part of the 20th, several additional Portuguese immigrants arrived; the last wave was during 1930–1965.

The most recent figure is from the 2011 Uruguayan census, which revealed 367 people who declared Portugal as their country of birth while in 2019 the UN estimated 579 Portuguese-born people living in the country.

However, as of 2021, 3,069 Portuguese citizens have registered as residing in Uruguay within Portuguese authorities. This figure is higher than the data collected in the Uruguayan latest census or the one provided by the UN since many Portuguese citizens may have been born elsewhere, thus not counting as "born in Portugal".

Actual figures may be higher because it is not mandatory for Portuguese citizens to notify their embassy upon moving abroad. In addition to Portuguese citizens, there are also many luso-descendants (lusodescendentes) whose numbers are hard to estimate.

== Notable people ==
Past

- Enrique Almada (1934–1990), comedian and actor
- Enrique Amorim (1900–1960), writer
- Fernando O. Assunção (1931–2006), ethnologist and folklorist
- Wilson Ferreira Aldunate (1919–1988), politician
- Manuel Flores Mora (1923–1984), politician and journalist
- Eudoro Melo (1889–1975), poet
- Alceu Ribeiro (1919–2013), painter
- Aparicio Saravia (1856–1904), political leader
- Villanueva Saravia (1964–1998), mayor of Cerro Largo
- Olhinto María Simoes (1901–1966), poet and journalist
- Amílcar Vasconcellos (1915–1999), lawyer and politician
- Carlos Vaz Ferreira (1872–1958), philosopher
- María Eugenia Vaz Ferreira (1875–1924), poet

Present

- José Amorín (born 1954 in Montevideo), politician
- Adrián Caetano (born 1969 in Montevideo), film director
- Mónica Farro (born 1976 in Montevideo), vedette
- Beatriz Flores Silva (born 1956 in Montevideo), film director
- Manuel Flores Silva (born 1950 in Montevideo), politician and journalist
- José Luis Pintos Saldanha (born 1964 in Artigas), footballer
- Sebastián Abreu (born 1976 in Minas), footballer
- Mario Regueiro (born 1978 in Montevideo), footballer
- Diana Saravia Olmos, notary and politician
- Fernando Vilar (born 1954 in Portugal), newsanchor and journalist
- Lucas Torreira (born 1996 in Fray Bentos), footballer
- Victoria Saravia (born 1986 in Melo), model and television personality

== See also ==
- Portugal–Uruguay relations
- Portuguese diaspora
- Ethnic groups in Uruguay
- Portuguese conquest of the Banda Oriental
- Brazilian immigration to Uruguay
