= Portugal–Uruguay relations =

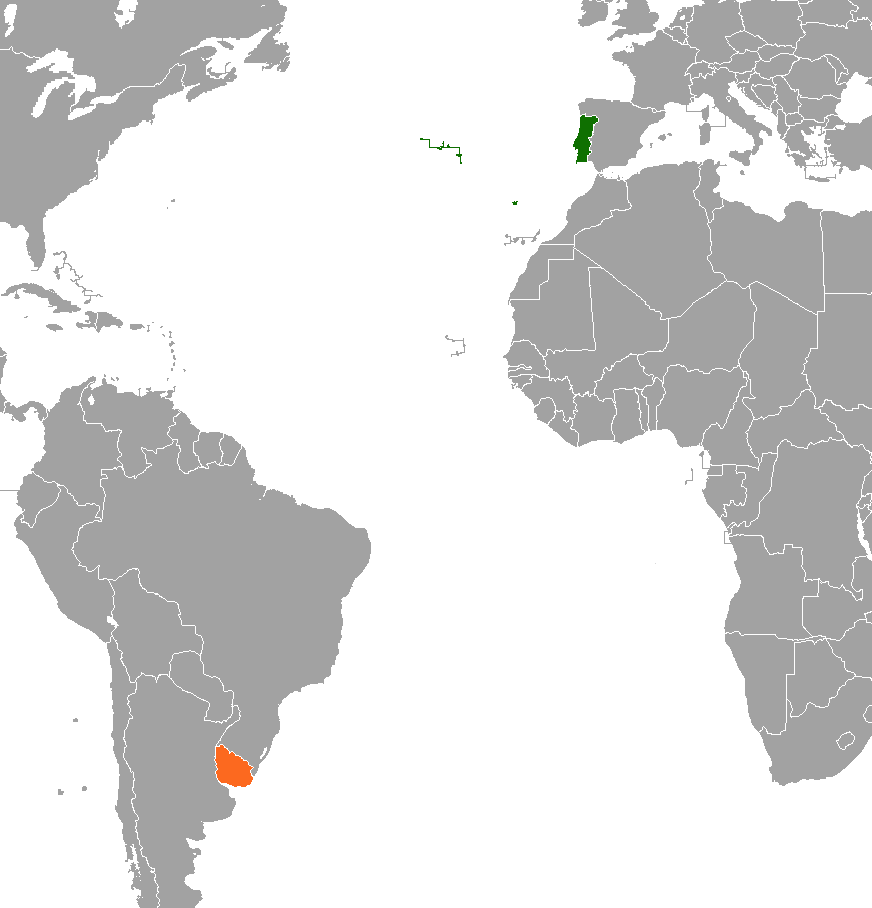
- Portugal: Uruguay

Portugal–Uruguay relations refers to the current and historical relations between Portugal and Uruguay. Both nations are members of the Organization of Ibero-American States and the United Nations.

== History ==
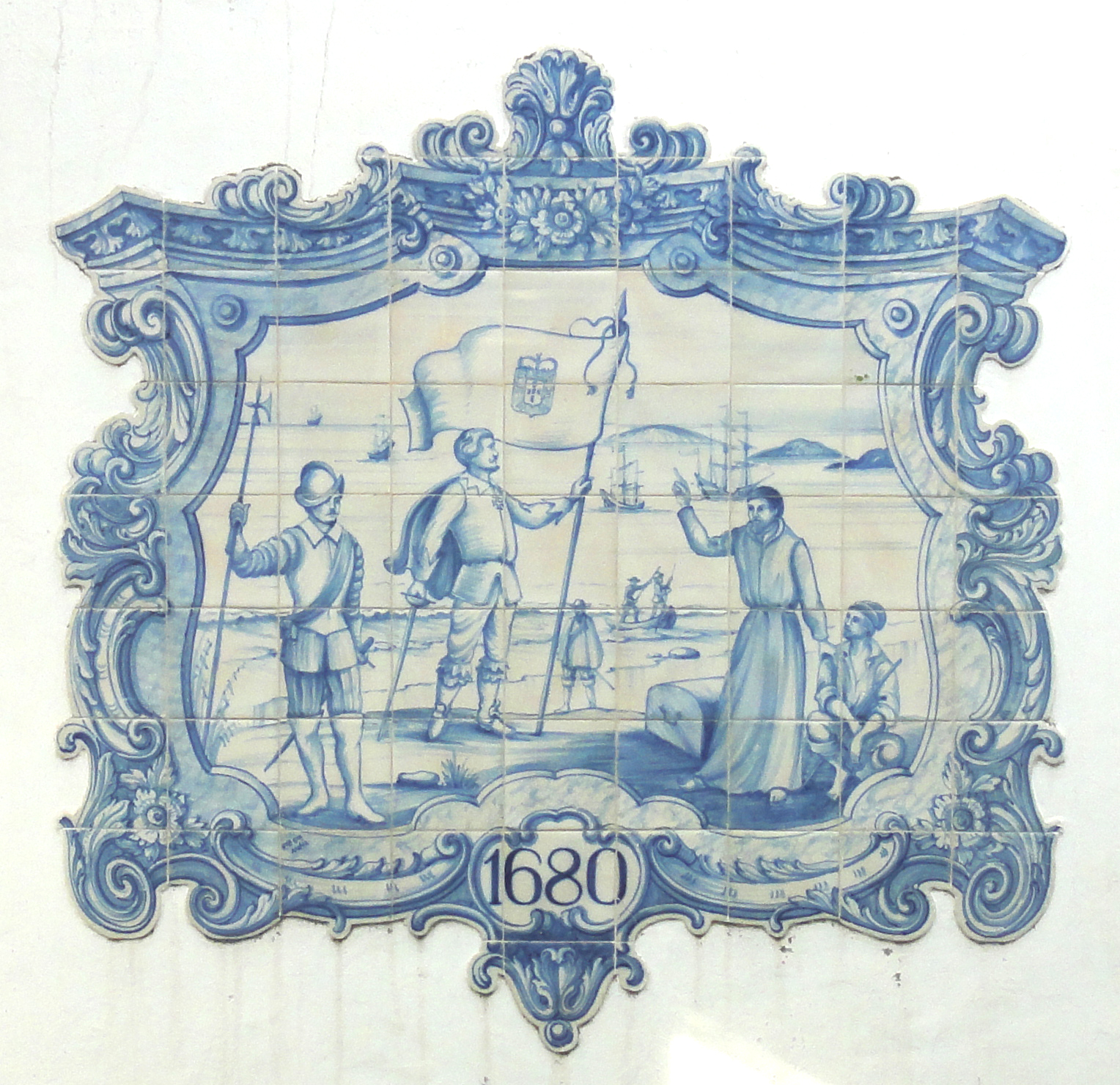
Portuguese azulejo depicting the foundation of Colonia del Sacramento for Portugal in 1680.

In 1680, Portuguese colonists established Colônia do Sacramento on the northern bank of Río de la Plata, on the opposite coast from Buenos Aires. Spanish colonial activity increased as Spain sought to limit Portugal's expansion of Brazil's frontiers. The Spanish also moved to capture Colonia del Sacramento. The 1750 Treaty of Madrid secured Spanish control over Banda Oriental (present day Uruguay), and settled the boundaries between Spain and Portugal.

In 1776, the new Viceroyalty of the Río de la Plata was established with its capital in Buenos Aires and it included the territory of Banda Oriental. In 1816, Portugal conquered Banda Oriental from Spain and incorporated the territory into the United Kingdom of Portugal, Brazil and the Algarves and it became the Cisplatina province within Brazil. In 1824, after the Siege of Montevideo, Banda Oriental became an integral part of independent Brazil. In 1825, the newly named Uruguay became an independent nation.

In 1843, Portugal opened a consulate in Montevideo. In October 1910, Uruguay recognized the Portuguese Republic. In May 1918, Uruguay recognized President Sidónio Pais and his Government.

In October 1998, Uruguayan President, Julio María Sanguinetti, paid a visit to Porto, Portugal to attend the 8th Ibero-American Summit. In 2003, Portuguese President, Jorge Sampaio, paid an official visit to Uruguay. In November 2006, both the President of Portugal, Aníbal Cavaco Silva and Prime Minister, José Sócrates, paid a visit to Uruguay to attend the 16th Ibero-American Summit in Montevideo. In September 2007, Uruguayan President Tabaré Vázquez paid an official visit to Portugal.

In June 2019, the European Union (which includes Portugal) and Mercosur (which includes Uruguay) signed a free trade agreement.

== Trade relations ==
In 2023, Portugal exported $18,400,000 to Uruguay, with major products including cement articles, special purpose motor vehicles, and fruits. Exports from Portugal have decreased by 1.16% annually since 2018, when they totaled $19,500,000. On the other hand, Uruguay exported $133,000,000 to Portugal in 2023, primarily consisting of fuel wood, rice, and frozen bovine meat. However, Uruguay's exports have also decreased by 0.71% annually since 2018.

In 2024, Portugal’s exports to Uruguay dropped by 47.6% year-over-year, totaling €893,000, while imports from Uruguay also fell by 42% to €4,450,000. The decrease was due to declines in the export of stone, plaster, and cement, as well as imports of edible animal products and cereals. Despite these reductions, Portugal maintains a trade surplus with Uruguay, particularly in machines, stone, glass, and metals. In contrast, Uruguay had a trade surplus with Portugal in wood products and animal products during 2018.

== Key bilateral agreements ==
- Agreement on the trade of Wine (1877)
- Trade Agreement (1957)
- Agreement for the exemption of visas for tourism or business purposes for up to three months (1985)
- Cultural Agreement (1992)
- Agreement for the promotion and mutual protection of investments (1997)
- Agreement of Cooperation in the field of tourism (1998)
- Agreement for the prevention and repression of illicit trafficking in narcotic drugs and psychotropic substances and their essential substances and chemicals (1998)
- Agreement for Defense Cooperation (2007)
- Agreement on Economic Cooperation (2007)
- Agreement to avoid double taxation and prevent tax evasion in terms of taxes on income and on assets and the respective protocol (2009)
- Memorandum of Understanding for high-level political consultations (2018)
- Agreement on the exercise of paid professional activities by family members of diplomatic, administrative and technical personnel from diplomatic missions and consular posts (2018).

== Sporting relations ==
According to the Guardian, Portugal and Uruguay have a football rivalry, marked by competitive clashes between players like Cristiano Ronaldo and Luis Suárez. Their encounters are often intense, with notable moments including on-pitch altercations involving defenders like Pepe and Godín. Despite their fierce competition, both teams bring distinct values to the game; Portugal as European champions in 2016 and Uruguay as South American champions in 2011. Uruguay's long-standing team cohesion, led by Óscar Tabárez, has contributed to their reputation for resilience and grit, while Portugal's star power, particularly Ronaldo, is a focal point. Matches between the two are anticipated for their high stakes, physicality, and passionate play.

== Resident diplomatic missions ==
- Portugal has an embassy in Montevideo.
- Uruguay has an embassy in Lisbon.

== See also ==
- Foreign relations of Portugal
- Foreign relations of Uruguay
- Portuguese Uruguayans
