= Serafín Bejérez =

Uruguayan farmer and politician (1952–2022)

Intendant of Cerro Largo
- In office 12 August 1998 – 16 December 1999
- Preceded by: Villanueva Saravia
- Succeeded by: Diego Saravia Saravia

Personal details
- Born: Rufino Serafín Bejérez Pereira das Neves; 13 July 1952 Melo, Uruguay
- Died: 29 October 2022 (aged 70) Melo, Uruguay
- Party: PN
- Occupation: Farmer

Rufino Serafín Bejérez Pereira das Neves (13 July 1952 – 29 October 2022) was a Uruguayan farmer and politician. A member of the National Party, he served as intendant of Cerro Largo from 1998 to 1999.

Bejérez died on 29 October 2022, at the age of 70.
