= Pepe (footballer, born February 1983) =

Portuguese footballer (born 1983)

Pepe ComM
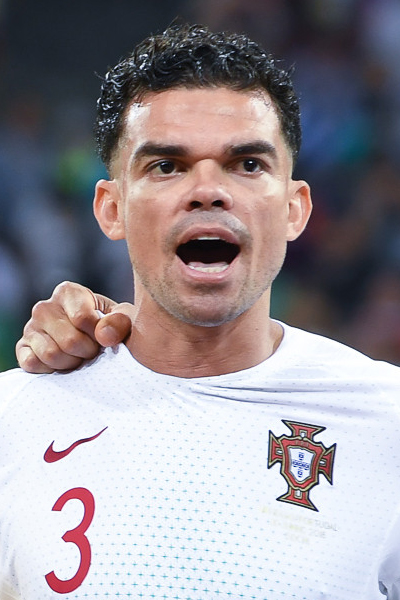
- Pepe with Portugal at the 2018 FIFA World Cup

Personal information
- Full name: Kepler Laverán de Lima Ferreira
- Date of birth: 26 February 1983 (age 43)
- Place of birth: Maceió, Brazil
- Height: 1.88 m (6 ft 2 in)
- Positions: Centre-back; defensive midfielder

Youth career
- 1995–2001: Corinthians Alagoano

Senior career*
Years	Team	Apps	(Gls)
2001–2002	Marítimo B	14	(1)
2002–2004	Marítimo	64	(3)
2004–2007	Porto	64	(6)
2007–2017	Real Madrid	229	(13)
2017–2018	Beşiktaş	33	(5)
2019–2024	Porto	132	(7)
Total		535	(35)

International career
2007–2024	Portugal	141	(8)
Medal record
Men's football
Representing Portugal
UEFA European Championship
Winner	2016 France
Bronze medal – third place	2012 Poland–Ukraine
UEFA Nations League
Winner	2019 Portugal
FIFA Confederations Cup
Third place	2017 Russia
- * Club domestic league appearances and goals

Kepler Laveran de Lima Ferreira ComM (born 26 February 1983), known as Pepe (Brazilian Portuguese: [ˈpɛpi], European Portuguese: [ˈpɛpɨ]), is a former professional footballer who played as a centre-back. He is regarded as one of the greatest defenders of his generation.

Born and raised in Brazil, Pepe moved to Portugal to sign with Marítimo, before moving to Porto in 2004. During his first Porto stint, he won two Primeira Liga titles, two Taças de Portugal and the Intercontinental Cup. Three years later, he moved to Real Madrid and went on to become a mainstay for the club, winning fifteen major honours, including three La Liga titles, two FIFA Club World Cup titles, two Copa del Rey titles and three UEFA Champions League titles, playing a crucial part in all three UEFA Champions League wins. Out of contract, Pepe signed with Turkish club Beşiktaş in 2017, before returning to Porto in 2019. In his final stint with the Dragões, he won a further two league titles, four Taças de Portugal and a Taça da Liga.

Internationally, Pepe opted to play for Portugal, representing the nation at four FIFA World Cups and five UEFA European Championships. He won the UEFA Euro 2016 title in France, being named player of the match in the final, and was named in the UEFA Euro Team of the Tournament in 2008, 2012 and 2016. He also won the inaugural UEFA Nations League in 2019. Between his debut in 2007 and 2024, Pepe earned 141 caps.

== Club career ==
=== Marítimo ===
Born in Maceió, Alagoas, Pepe was named Kepler Laveran by his father in honour to scientists Johannes Kepler and Charles Louis Alphonse Laveran. He started playing football with local Corinthians Alagoano. At age 18, alongside teammate Ezequias, he moved to Portugal to sign with Marítimo in Madeira, spending the vast majority of his first season with the B-team.

After being promoted to the main squad for the 2002–03 season, under Ukrainian manager Anatoliy Byshovets, Pepe rarely missed a match, playing in several positions including defensive midfielder.

During the 2002–03 pre-season, Pepe was given permission to train with Sporting CP for two weeks, after which a deal could be negotiated for his transfer. However, neither club could agree on financial terms and the negotiations broke down, with the player returning and going on to help Marítimo finish sixth in the following campaign and qualify to the UEFA Cup, having contributed with 1 goal in 30 matches.

=== Porto ===
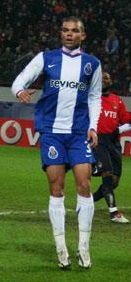
Pepe playing for Porto in 2006

In May 2004, shortly before the club sealed the league and UEFA Champions League, Pepe signed for Porto.

In his first season, with Spanish coach Víctor Fernández at the helm, Pepe was mostly used as a backup player, playing under veterans Pedro Emanuel, Jorge Costa and utility defender Ricardo Costa. However, in the following year, under the guidance of Co Adriaanse, he had a breakthrough season, establishing himself as one of the best defenders in the domestic competition: the Dutchman often chose a 3–4–3 offensive system, with the player often pitched as the only natural stopper. Porto eventually won back-to-back leagues and the Taça de Portugal.

=== Real Madrid ===
==== 2007–11: Transfer and rise to prominence ====
On 10 July 2007, Real Madrid signed Pepe to a five-year contract, paying Porto a €30 million transfer fee. On 15 March 2008, Pepe scored the only (own) goal in a 0–1 away loss against Deportivo La Coruña. Eight months later, he was involved in a fight during training with teammate Javier Balboa – the defender was nonetheless called up for Real's next match, whereas the winger was not. As Los Blancos were eventually crowned champions of La Liga, he delivered a Man of the match performance in a 1–0 win at the Camp Nou against Barcelona.

Pepe was constantly hampered by injuries throughout the 2008–09 campaign. On 21 April 2009, he was also involved in an incident with Getafe's Javier Casquero: with the score at 2–2 and only a few minutes to play, he brought down the midfielder in the penalty area, being subsequently sent off. He then kicked Casquero twice, once on his shin and once on his lower back. When being pulled away from Casquero, he also pushed his head into the turf and stamped on him several times. In the ensuing mêlée, he also struck another opposing player, Juan Ángel Albín, in the face and eventually received a ten-match ban, which effectively ended his season.

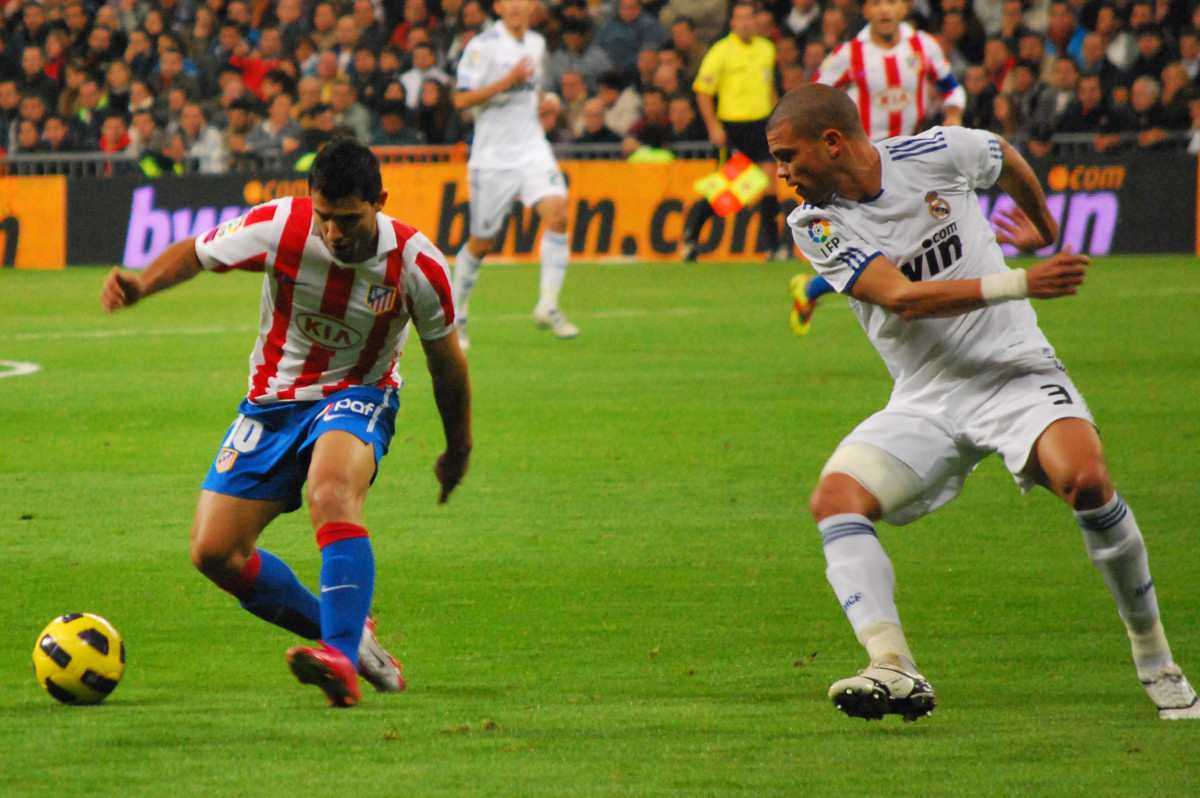
Pepe chasing down Sergio Agüero of Atlético Madrid in 2010

In the 2009–10 season, Pepe returned to claim his place back in the starting line-ups. On 4 October 2009, he scored his first goal in the league, against Sevilla at the Ramón Sánchez Pizjuán Stadium, heading home from a Guti free-kick in a 1–2 loss. However, on 12 December, during a match at Mestalla against Valencia (3–2 win), he landed awkwardly following an aerial challenge and was stretchered off the pitch in the dying minutes of the first half. Scans later showed that he ruptured his right knee's anterior cruciate ligament. He went on to miss the rest of the season, jeopardising his 2010 FIFA World Cup chances.

For 2010–11, Pepe was joined at Real Madrid by countrymen Ricardo Carvalho and manager José Mourinho, pairing up with Carvalho to form one of the most efficient defensive pairings in La Liga. On 2 October 2010, Diario AS published an article where the player was reportedly open to leave the club on a Bosman transfer. According to the newspaper, "[W]hen he signed for Real Madrid in 2007, he sacrificed a part of his salary to pay for his huge transfer fee – this made him one of the lowest earners at the club, making €1.8 million a year." Again, he missed several matches due to injury and, after exhausting negotiations, finally signed a new contract, renewing his link to the club until 2015.

Pepe spent the final stretch of the season appearing as a defensive midfielder as Real Madrid faced Barcelona four times in less than one month. On 27 April 2011, in the UEFA Champions League semi-final first leg, he was sent off for a controversial challenge on Barcelona defender Dani Alves in an eventual 0–2 home loss. However, Alves also came into strong criticism, with Real Madrid claiming the Brazilian fullback had exaggerated the incident. Additionally, sportspersons including Rio Ferdinand, Michael Owen and Rory McIlroy criticised Alves' actions. The next day, UEFA opened disciplinary cases against both clubs for a number of incidents during the match. The verdict was announced eight days later: the red card stood and Pepe therefore received a one-match ban from European competition, which he served by not playing in the 1–1 draw in the second leg at Camp Nou.

==== 2011–17: European and domestic success and departure ====
On 12 July 2011, Pepe extended his contract with Real Madrid again, until the end of the 2015–16 season. In a match against Osasuna on 6 November, he scored the team's second goal in an eventual 7–1 home routing. In the first match of the Copa del Rey quarter-final against Barcelona on 18 January 2012, he stamped on the hand of Lionel Messi, who was on the ground after having been fouled. The incident drew strong criticism from the Spanish media, who also noted his coming-together with Cesc Fàbregas earlier in the 1–2 home defeat, but he insisted that the incident, which was not seen by the referee, was "unintentional". On 23 January, the Royal Spanish Football Federation cleared him of any wrongdoing.

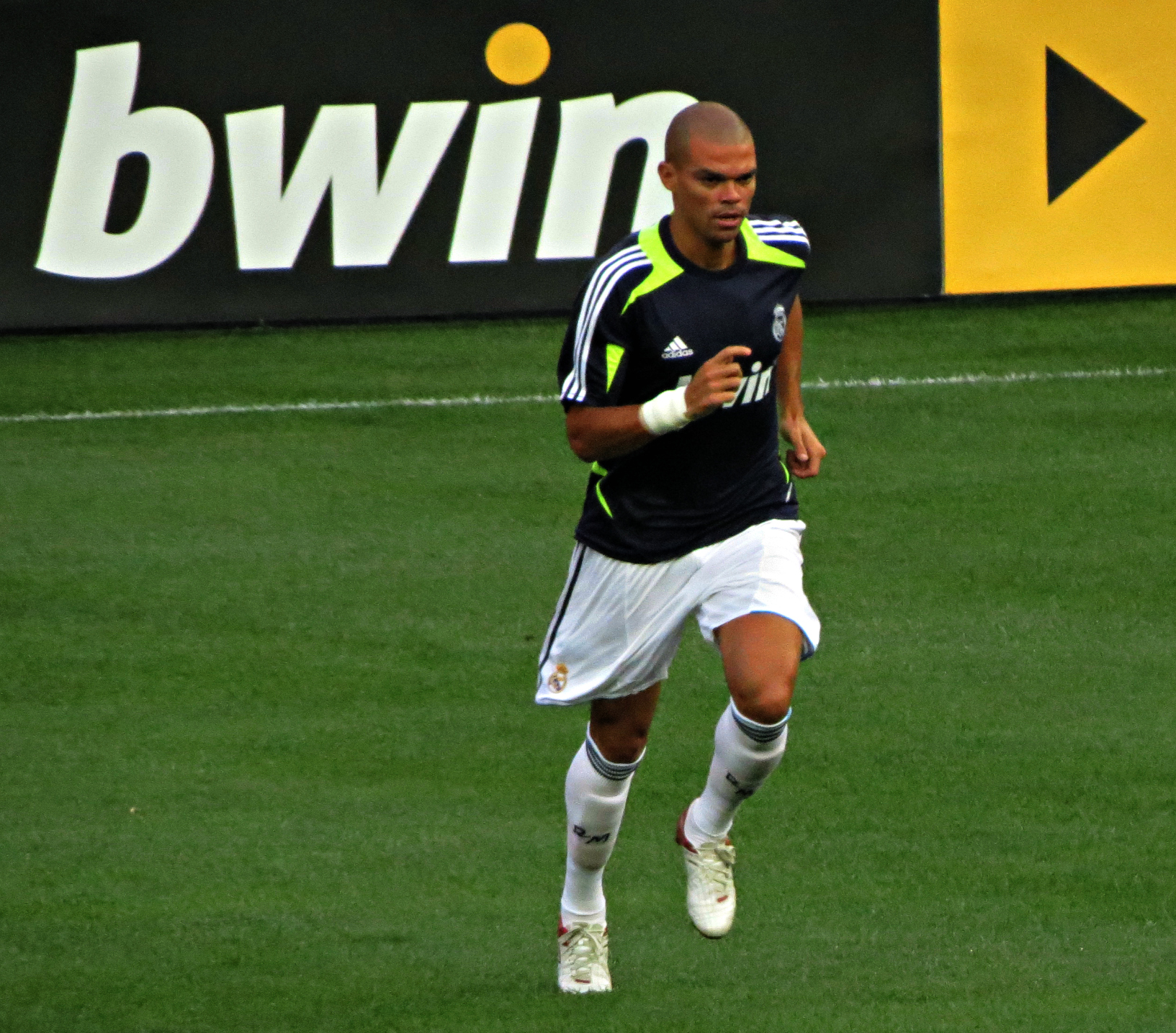
Pepe warming up for Real Madrid in 2012

On 21 March 2012, Pepe was involved in another serious incident: after a 1–1 away draw against Villarreal in which he was booked and Real Madrid finished with nine players, he confronted referee José Luis Paradas Romero in the locker room area, saying, "What a ripoff motherfucker." Two days later, he was suspended for two matches.

In the 2011–12 season, Pepe formed a formidable centre back partnership with Sergio Ramos. That campaign, he went on to make 29 appearances in La Liga and 45 appearances in all competitions as Real Madrid claimed their 32nd league title.

On 19 August 2012, in the league opener against Valencia, Pepe collided with Real Madrid goalkeeper Iker Casillas in the play that led to the visitors equalising the score 1–1 (the final result). He was subsequently taken to hospital for observation, being released the following day. Amid feuds with Mourinho, Pepe lost his starting place to Raphaël Varane throughout the season and would end up getting into a scuffle with Atlético Madrid manager Diego Simeone from the substitutes' bench in the 2013 Copa del Rey Final.

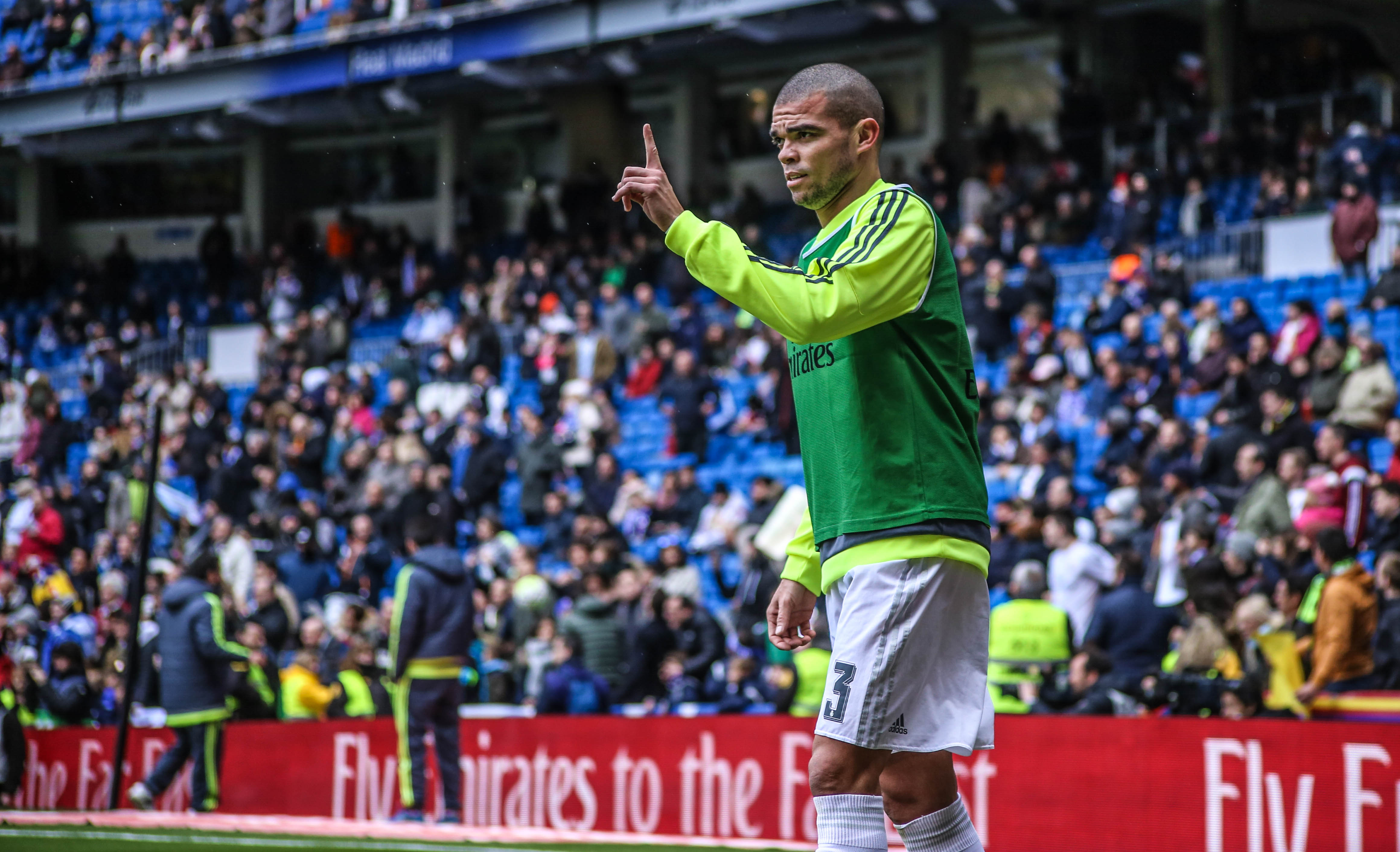
Pepe warming up for Real Madrid in 2016

In the 2013–14 season, Pepe had a personal career high number of goals scored and appearances made for Real Madrid, making 11 appearances in their La Decima winning campaign in the 2013-14 UEFA Champions League. Carlo Ancelotti, the Real Madrid manager at the time, spoke of his importance saying, "We're more assured with him. He gives us confidence, personality and he helps the other players; he is very important for them." In the 2015–16 season, Pepe made nine appearances in the UEFA Champions League and 31 appearances in all competitions. He started the match when the team won the Champions League final against Atlético Madrid in a penalty shoot-out at San Siro, Milan.

In his last year playing for Real Madrid, Pepe had an injury-riddled season, in which he made 13 appearances, when Madrid won their 33rd La Liga and their twelfth UEFA Champions League title, defeating Juventus in the final at Principality Stadium, Cardiff.

=== Beşiktaş ===
Turkish Süper Lig side Beşiktaş announced the signing of Pepe on a free transfer from Real Madrid, on 4 July 2017. His contract was worth €9.5 million in total over the two-years, plus a €4,000 bonus for each match played. On 13 August, he scored his first goal in a 2–0 home win against Antalyaspor.

On 19 April 2018, in the second leg of the Turkish Cup against Fenerbahçe, he received his first red card for Beşiktaş after a tackle on Souza. The match was later abandoned after the Beşiktaş coach was struck by an object thrown from the stands.

Pepe revoked his contract with Beşiktaş in a mutual agreement on 17 December 2018.

=== Return to Porto ===
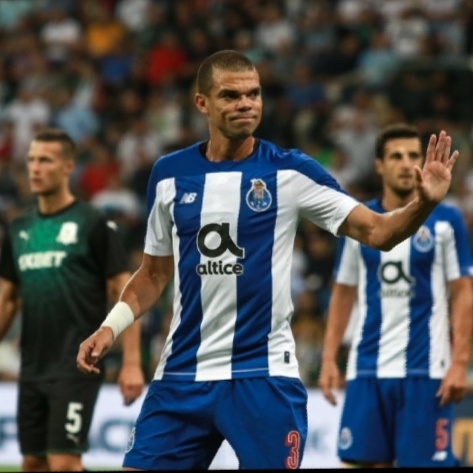
Pepe playing for Porto in 2019

On 8 January 2019, Pepe returned to Porto after over a decade, on a 2 1/2-year contract. A week later, he played his first game for Porto since 2007 in the 2018–19 Taça de Portugal quarter-finals, winning 2–1 away to Leixões. While his side ended the 2018–19 season as league runners-up on the final day and lost the cup final on penalties to Sporting, they won both tournaments in 2019–20.

Following Danilo Pereira's exit to Paris Saint-Germain, Pepe was appointed as club captain on 12 October 2020. The following month, he extended his contract to 2023.

On 11 February 2022, in a Portuguese derby match between Porto and Sporting CP, which ended in a 2–2 draw, Pepe was one of four players sent off after starting a brawl at the end of the match; during the course of the game, he also protested referee João Pinheiro's decision not to award Porto a penalty after Pepe was allegedly kicked in the head inside the opposing penalty area. He was later banned for two matches for violent conduct.

On 25 October 2023, at 40 years and 241 days, Pepe became the oldest outfield player to play in the UEFA Champions League, in a 4–1 group stage victory away at Royal Antwerp, breaking the record previously held by Alessandro Costacurta for 17 years. On 7 November, in the return fixture, Pepe headed in Porto's second goal in a 2–0 victory over Royal Antwerp, becoming, at 40 years and 254 days old, the oldest ever goalscorer in the UEFA Champions League history, breaking the record previously held by Manfred Burgsmüller in 1988. On 13 December, Pepe started and scored in a 5–3 Champions League victory over Shakhtar Donetsk, setting both his records to 40 years and 289 days.

On 12 March 2024, at 41 years old, in a match against Arsenal, Pepe became the first outfield player over the age of 40 to play in the Champions League knock-out stage.

== International career ==
=== 2008–2014: Naturalisation and early international career ===
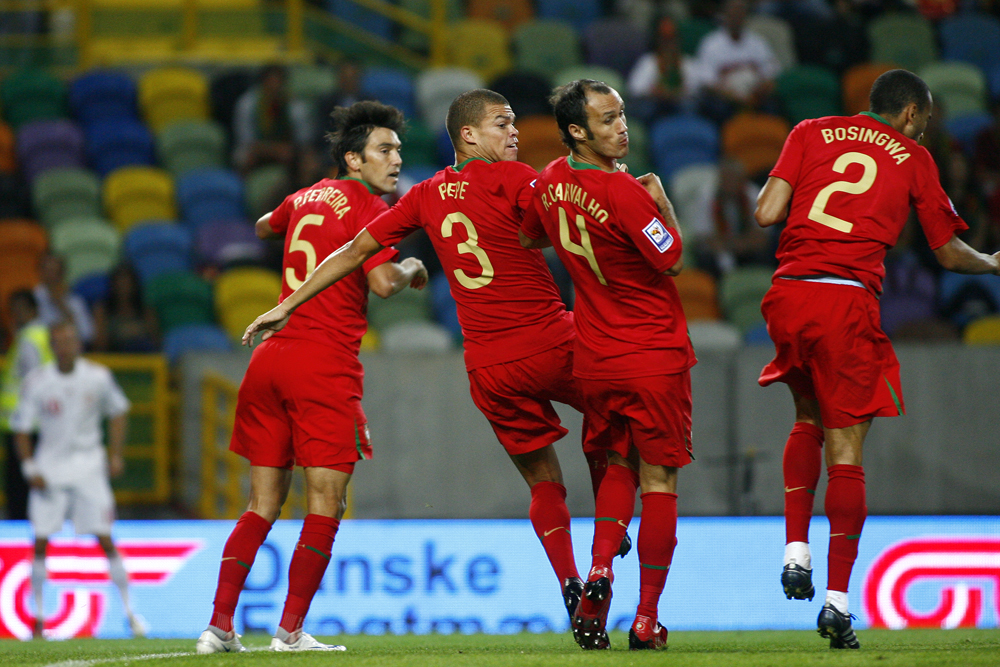
Pepe (number 3) with Portugal during a 2010 FIFA World Cup qualifier against Denmark in 2008

Pepe never represented his native Brazil in any youth category. However, according to the player's father, in 2006, he was contacted by head coach Dunga about a possible call-up, which he declined, stating that once he obtained Portuguese citizenship, he would join its national team. He became naturalised in August 2007 and, on 30 August, was named in the Portugal squad for the first time in view of a UEFA Euro 2008 qualifier against Poland. An injury while training for his club prevented the debut for his adopted country, which would materialise almost four months later, in Portugal's last match in the tournament against Finland on 21 November, a 0–0 home draw.

In the tournament's final stages, Pepe played in all of the national side's matches, scoring once in a 2–0 win against Turkey on 7 June 2008. Portugal was eliminated in the quarter-finals by Germany.

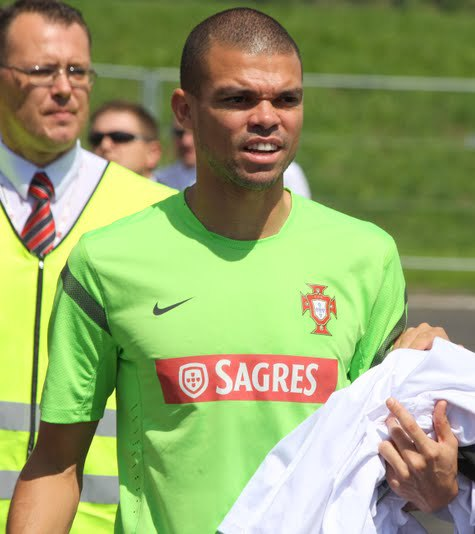
Pepe training with Portugal at Euro 2012

During the 2010 FIFA World Cup qualifying campaign, Pepe was often used as a defensive midfielder by national coach Carlos Queiroz. After his serious knee injury while playing for Real Madrid, he was eventually selected for the national squad that participated in the finals in South Africa, appearing against Brazil in the group stage (0–0) and eventual champions Spain in the round of 16 (0–1 loss).

Again a starter in Euro 2012 under manager Paulo Bento, Pepe opened the score in the second group game against Denmark, heading home after a João Moutinho corner kick in an eventual 3–2 win. He was later chosen by UEFA as man of the match and, in the semi-final, he was one of two Portugal players to score in a 2–4 penalty shootout defeat to eventual winners Spain.

In the 2014 World Cup, Pepe received a red card in the first half of Portugal's opening match against eventual champions Germany, for headbutting Thomas Müller late into the first half of an eventual 0–4 loss. At the time, Müller was sitting on the ground and Pepe walked back to Müller to headbutt him. He was suspended for the following match, which Portugal drew 2–2 with the United States, before returning to the team for the final Group G fixture against Ghana.

=== 2016–2019: European champion, Nations League title and 100 caps ===
Pepe started in central defence in six of Portugal's seven matches at UEFA Euro 2016. After missing the semi-final against Wales with a thigh injury, he returned to the team for the final, where he was named man of the match, helping his team to keep a clean-sheet in a 1–0 extra-time victory over hosts France and win Portugal's first ever international title. His performance in the final was particularly noted by Sky Sports and Football Paradise's Juuso Kilpeläinen for being firm and disciplined.

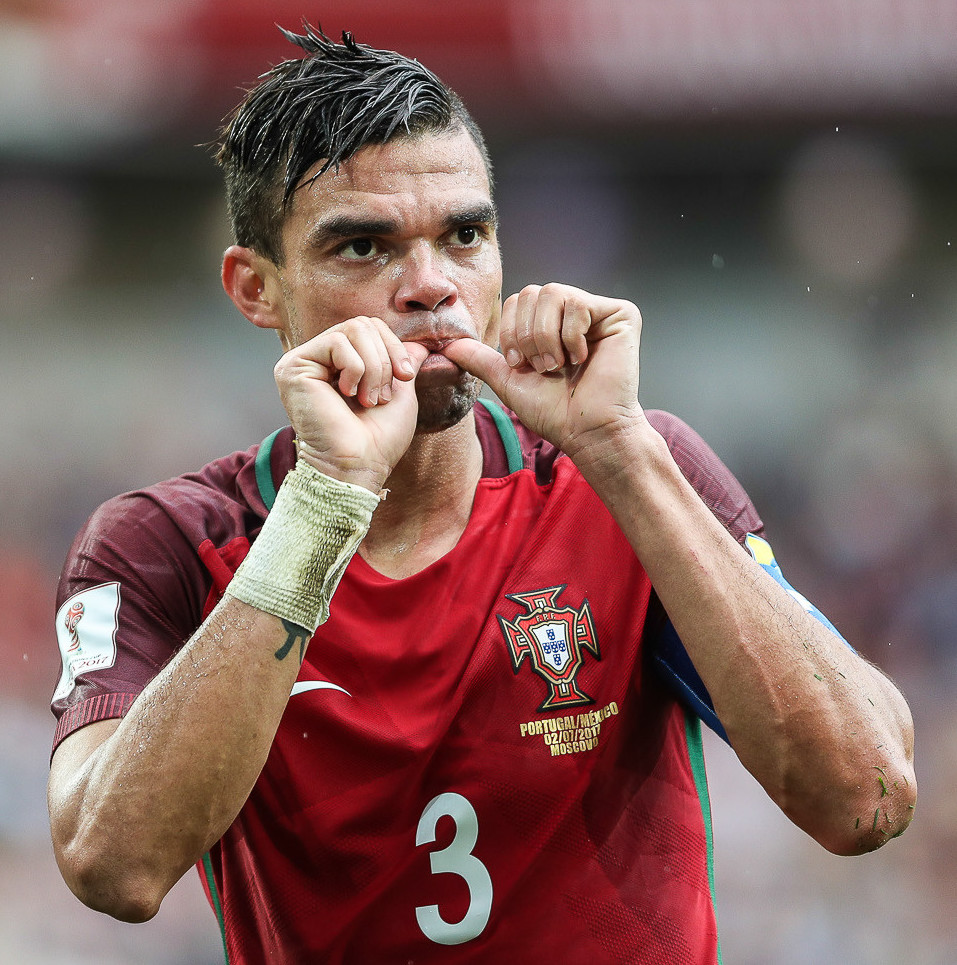
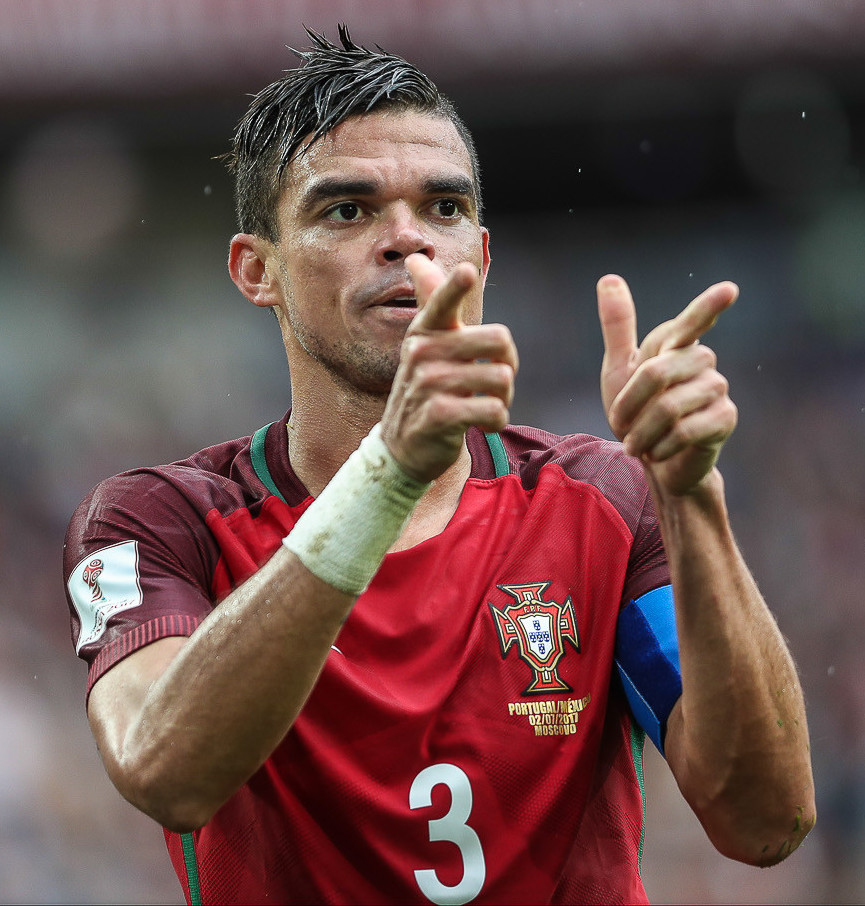
Pepe celebrates after scoring a late equaliser against Mexico at the 2017 FIFA Confederations Cup in Moscow

On 2 July 2017, in the third-place match against Mexico at the 2017 FIFA Confederations Cup, Pepe scored an injury time equaliser to send the match into extra-time. Portugal eventually won the match 2–1 to capture the bronze medal.

In Portugal's opening match against Spain during the 2018 World Cup, Pepe went down after a collision with Spain forward Diego Costa, who then took the ball into the penalty area before scoring. The goal was checked by the video assistant referee (VAR), who allowed the goal to stand. In Portugal's second match, Pepe went down after he was tapped on the back by Morocco's Medhi Benatia. In the BBC studio, former footballer Rio Ferdinand called Pepe's dive "embarrassing". Former striker Didier Drogba also expressed derision for Pepe, stating "he's been doing this quite a few times". Pepe scored in Portugal's 2–1 defeat against Uruguay in the last 16.

On 6 September 2018 in a friendly match against Croatia at the Estádio do Algarve, Pepe earned his 100th cap. He captained the side and headed an equaliser from Pizzi's cross to secure a 1–1 draw.

Pepe was part of Portugal's squad for their UEFA Nations League win in 2019. He captained the team in three of the four Group 3 matches, before starting in central defence in the semi-final against Switzerland. During the match, he fractured his right shoulder which led to his missing the 2019 UEFA Nations League Final which Portugal won 1–0 against the Netherlands.

=== 2020–2024: Final international tournaments and retirement ===
Due to Zlatan Ibrahimović's injury, 38-year-old Pepe was the oldest outfield player at the delayed UEFA Euro 2020 finals in June 2021. On 11 November that year, he was sent off in a goalless draw away to the Republic of Ireland in 2022 FIFA World Cup qualification.

In October 2022, he was named in Portugal's preliminary 55-man squad for the 2022 FIFA World Cup in Qatar, being included in the final 26-man squad for the tournament. He scored Portugal's second goal in a thrashing 6–1 win in the round of 16 match against Switzerland; by doing so, at 39 years and 283 days old, he became the oldest player to score at the knock-out stage and second-oldest player to ever score in the tournament, behind Cameroonian striker Roger Milla, who was 42 years and 39 days old when he scored against Russia in the 1994 FIFA World Cup. As of 23 June 2026, he stands as the third-oldest player to score in the tournament, following Cristiano Ronaldo's goal vs Uzbekistan, at 41 years and 138 days old.

In May 2024, Pepe was selected in the 26-man squad for the UEFA Euro 2024. In the opening match against the Czech Republic, on 18 June, he became the oldest player to feature in the European Championship, aged 41 years and 113 days. He also became one of only three players to feature in five European Championships. Portugal were eliminated in the quarter-finals to France after losing 5–3 on penalties; this marked Pepe's final game in professional football. One month after this match, on 8 August 2024, one day before the start of the 2024–25 Primeira Liga season, he announced his retirement from professional football at the age of 41.

== Style of play ==
Considered to be one of the best defenders of his generation, in his prime Pepe was a quick, aggressive, physically strong, and tenacious defender, who was known for his work-rate, energy, and hard-tackling style of play. Due to his height, he was also an aerial threat on set-pieces. While he usually played as a centre-back, he was also used as a defensive midfielder on occasion at international level. However, despite his defensive abilities, he also drew criticism in the media due to his tendency to pick up cards, as he often showed violent or unsportsmanlike behaviour on the pitch, in particular during his time at Real Madrid, which included diving, and violent challenges on the pitch. However, despite his reputation, he has also been recognised by pundits, players, and managers for his leadership, tactical intelligence, longevity, and consistency.

== Personal life ==
Pepe is married to Ana Sofia Moreira, whom he met in Porto in 2007. Together, they have two daughters and one son.

== Career statistics ==
=== Club ===
Appearances and goals by club, season and competition
Club	Season	League			National cup (Note: Includes Taça de Portugal, Copa del Rey, Turkish Cup)		League cup (Note: Includes Taça da Liga)		Continental		Other		Total	
Club	Season	Division	Apps	Goals	Apps	Goals	Apps	Goals	Apps	Goals	Apps	Goals	Apps	Goals
Marítimo	2001–02	Primeira Liga	4	0	0	0	—		—		—		4	0
Marítimo	2002–03	Primeira Liga	29	2	0	0	—		—		—		29	2
Marítimo	2003–04	Primeira Liga	30	1	1	0	—		—		—		31	1
Marítimo	Total		63	3	1	0	—		—		—		64	3
Porto	2004–05	Primeira Liga	15	1	1	0	—		5 (Note: Appearances in UEFA Champions League)	0	1 (Note: Appearance in UEFA Super Cup)	0	22	1
Porto	2005–06	Primeira Liga	24	1	4	0	—		5	2	—		33	3
Porto	2006–07	Primeira Liga	25	4	0	0	—		8	0	1 (Note: Appearance in Supertaça Cândido de Oliveira)	0	34	4
Porto	Total		64	6	5	0	—		18	2	2	0	89	8
Real Madrid	2007–08	La Liga	19	0	1	0	—		3	0	2 (Note: Appearance(s) in Supercopa de España)	0	25	0
Real Madrid	2008–09	La Liga	26	0	0	0	—		5	0	1	0	32	0
Real Madrid	2009–10	La Liga	10	1	1	0	—		6	0	—		17	1
Real Madrid	2010–11	La Liga	26	1	4	0	—		8	0	—		38	1
Real Madrid	2011–12	La Liga	29	1	5	0	—		9	0	2	0	45	1
Real Madrid	2012–13	La Liga	28	1	2	0	—		11	1	1	0	42	2
Real Madrid	2013–14	La Liga	30	4	7	1	—		11	0	—		48	5
Real Madrid	2014–15	La Liga	27	2	1	0	—		6	0	4 (Note: One appearance in UEFA Super Cup, one appearance in Supercopa de España, two appearances in FIFA Club World Cup)	0	38	2
Real Madrid	2015–16	La Liga	21	1	1	0	—		9	0	—		31	1
Real Madrid	2016–17	La Liga	13	2	2	0	—		3	0	0	0	18	2
Real Madrid	Total		229	13	24	1	—		71	1	10	0	334	15
Beşiktaş	2017–18	Süper Lig	23	2	5	0	—		6	0	1 (Note: Appearance in Turkish Super Cup)	0	35	2
Beşiktaş	2018–19	Süper Lig	10	3	0	0	—		7 (Note: Appearances in UEFA Europa League)	2	—		17	5
Beşiktaş	Total		33	5	5	0	—		13	2	1	0	52	7
Porto	2018–19	Primeira Liga	13	2	3	0	2	0	3	0	—		21	2
Porto	2019–20	Primeira Liga	25	1	2	0	1	0	9 (Note: Two appearances in UEFA Champions League, seven appearances in UEFA Europa League)	0	—		37	1
Porto	2020–21	Primeira Liga	27	2	4	0	2	0	6	0	1	0	40	2
Porto	2021–22	Primeira Liga	21	1	3	0	0	0	9 (Note: Five appearances in UEFA Champions League, four appearances in UEFA Europa League)	0	—		33	1
Porto	2022–23	Primeira Liga	24	0	5	0	2	0	4	0	1	0	36	0
Porto	2023–24	Primeira Liga	22	1	4	0	0	0	7	2	1	0	34	3
Porto	Total		132	7	21	0	7	0	38	2	3	0	201	9
Career total			521	34	56	1	7	0	140	7	16	0	742	42

=== International ===
Appearances and goals by national team and year
National team	Year	Apps	Goals
Portugal	2007	1	0
Portugal	2008	12	1
Portugal	2009	11	1
Portugal	2010	6	0
Portugal	2011	7	0
Portugal	2012	12	1
Portugal	2013	8	0
Portugal	2014	8	0
Portugal	2015	3	0
Portugal	2016	13	1
Portugal	2017	11	1
Portugal	2018	11	2
Portugal	2019	5	0
Portugal	2020	5	0
Portugal	2021	10	0
Portugal	2022	10	1
Portugal	2023	1	0
Portugal	2024	7	0
Total		141	8

Scores and results list Portugal's goal tally first.

List of international goals scored by Pepe
No.	Date	Venue	Opponent	Score	Result	Competition
1	7 June 2008	Stade de Genève, Geneve, Switzerland	Turkey	1–0	2–0	UEFA Euro 2008
2	9 September 2009	Stadium Puskás Ferenc, Budapest, Hungary	Hungary	1–0	1–0	2010 FIFA World Cup qualification
3	13 June 2012	Arena Lviv, Lviv, Ukraine	Denmark	1–0	3–2	UEFA Euro 2012
4	1 September 2016	Estádio do Bessa, Porto, Portugal	Gibraltar	5–0	5–0	Friendly
5	2 July 2017	Otkrytiye Arena, Moscow, Russia	Mexico	1–1	2–1 (a.e.t.)	2017 FIFA Confederations Cup
6	30 June 2018	Fisht Olympic Stadium, Sochi, Russia	Uruguay	1–1	1–2	2018 FIFA World Cup
7	6 September 2018	Estádio Algarve, Faro/Loulé, Portugal	Croatia	1–1	1–1	Friendly
8	6 December 2022	Lusail Iconic Stadium, Lusail, Qatar	Switzerland	2–0	6–1	2022 FIFA World Cup

== Honours ==
Porto

- Primeira Liga: 2005–06, 2006–07, 2019–20, 2021–22
- Taça de Portugal: 2005–06, 2019–20, 2021–22, 2022–23, 2023–24
- Taça da Liga: 2022–23
- Supertaça Cândido de Oliveira: 2006, 2020, 2022
- Intercontinental Cup: 2004

Real Madrid

- La Liga: 2007–08, 2011–12, 2016–17
- Copa del Rey: 2010–11, 2013–14
- Supercopa de España: 2008, 2012
- UEFA Champions League: 2013–14, 2015–16, 2016–17
- UEFA Super Cup: 2014
- FIFA Club World Cup: 2014, 2016

Portugal

- UEFA European Championship: 2016
- UEFA Nations League: 2018–19

=== Individual ===
- UEFA European Championship Team of the Tournament: 2008, 2012, 2016
- UEFA Champions League Squad of the Season: 2013–14
- ESM Team of the Season: 2013–14
- CNID Best Portuguese Athlete Abroad: 2014
- Goal La Liga Team of the Season: 2010–11
- Süper Lig Team of the Season: 2017–18
- Süper Lig Defender of the Season: 2017–18
- Primeira Liga Team of the Year: 2019–20, 2020–21, 2021–22, 2022–23
- Primeira Liga Defender of the Month: March 2024,
- Quinas de Ouro Awards – Best Portuguese Player Playing in Portugal: 2020
- SJPF Player of the Month: April 2006

Orders

- Commander of the Order of Merit

== See also ==
- List of footballers with 100 or more UEFA Champions League appearances
- List of men's footballers with 100 or more international caps
