= 2015–16 Real Madrid CF season =

112th season in existence of Real Madrid CF

Real Madrid
2015–16 season
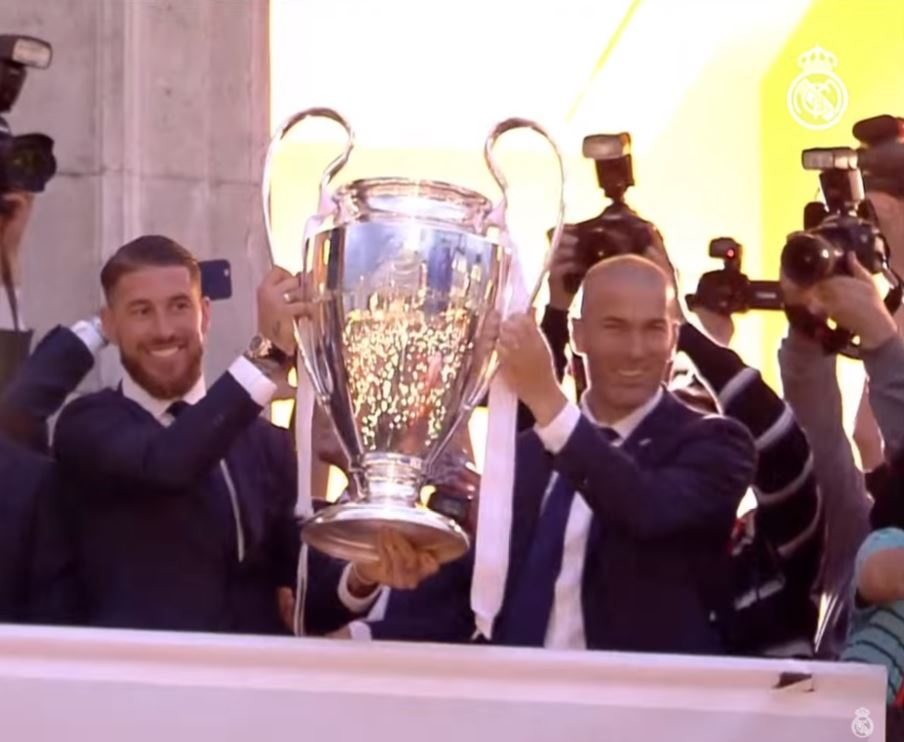
- Sergio Ramos (left) and Zinedine Zidane (right) with the UEFA Champions League trophy, 29 May 2016
- President: Florentino Pérez
- Head coach: Rafael Benítez (until 4 January 2016); Zinedine Zidane (from 4 January 2016)
- Stadium: Santiago Bernabéu
- La Liga: 2nd
- Copa del Rey: Round of 32 (disqualified)
- UEFA Champions League: Winners
- Top goalscorer: League: Cristiano Ronaldo (35); All: Cristiano Ronaldo (51)
- Highest home attendance: 80,148 (vs Barcelona, 21 November 2015)
- Lowest home attendance: 60,663 (vs Malmö FF, 8 December 2015)
- Average home league attendance: 68,929
- Biggest win: Real Madrid 10–2 Rayo Vallecano
- Biggest defeat: Barcelona 4–0 Real Madrid
Home colours	Away colours	Third colours

The 2015–16 season was the 112th season of the football club Real Madrid Club de Fútbol. It was the club's 85th consecutive season in the top tier of Spanish football, and ran from 1 July 2015 to 30 June 2016.

Under new manager Rafael Benítez, Real Madrid remained undefeated in the Spanish league (La Liga) until a 3–2 loss to Sevilla on matchday 11. During the tenure of Benítez, Real achieved lopsided wins both in La Liga and the Champions League, which included final scores of 6–0 vs Espanyol, 8–0 vs Malmö and 10–2 vs Rayo Vallecano. In the Copa del Rey round of 32, Real fielded an ineligible player, resulting in the team's controversial disqualification from the tournament.

Benítez was relieved of his duties mid-season, following allegations of unpopularity with supporters, displeasure from players and a failure to get good results against top teams. Benítez's departure was announced along with the promotion of Zinedine Zidane to his first head coaching role. Under Zidane, Real won the Champions League and recorded a 12-game winning streak to conclude their league campaign.

The 2015–16 season was the first season since 1998–99 to not feature goalkeeper Iker Casillas, who left Real after 16 years to sign with Porto.

== Season overview ==
=== Pre-season ===
La Décima winning coach Carlo Ancelotti left the club on 25 May 2015, after winning two out of possible six trophies in the 2014–15 season and narrowly missing out both on the league and Champions League titles. He was then replaced by Rafael Benítez on 3 June 2015.

Brazilian duo Casemiro and Danilo were bought from Porto for a fee of €7.5 million and €31.5 million respectively. Both signed long-term deals with the club, with Casemiro returning after Real Madrid exercised their buy-back clause option on the player. Spanish wingers Marco Asensio and Lucas Vázquez also joined the club, while Sami Khedira signed for Juventus after his contract was not renewed by the club. Javier Hernández soon departed back to Manchester United after Madrid did not make his season-long loan from the last campaign a permanent deal.

The contracts of Dani Carvajal, Marcelo and Sergio Ramos were renewed for another six years and were set to expire in the summer of 2020. Pepe extended his contract until 2017. Casemiro's contract was extended to 2021.

Iker Casillas left the club on 11 July 2015 and was transferred to Porto after 16 years with Real Madrid. Kiko Casilla was signed as a replacement on 17 July 2015.

The schedule of the season was announced on 14 July 2015. On 18 August 2015, Mateo Kovačić was signed from Internazionale, while Marco Asensio was loaned to Espanyol.

=== August ===
Madrid started off their 2015–16 league campaign with a goalless draw at Sporting de Gijón. Asier Illarramendi was sold to Real Sociedad on 26 August 2015, while Fábio Coentrão was loaned to Monaco and Lucas Silva was loaned to Marseille. Madrid defeated Real Betis 5–0 after braces from Gareth Bale and James Rodríguez and a goal from Karim Benzema.

=== September ===
Cristiano Ronaldo provided five goals and an assist for Benzema in a 6–0 away win over Espanyol. With the five goals, Ronaldo set his Spanish league goal tally to 230 goals in 203 games, surpassing Raúl's record of 228 goals in 550 games for Real Madrid in La Liga, becoming the all-time top scorer for Real Madrid in the Spanish league.

Real started the 2015–16 UEFA Champions League season with a 4–0 home victory over Shakhtar Donetsk. Benzema scored the opener and Ronaldo had another hat-trick four days after his last. A lone goal by Benzema lifted Madrid over Granada to maintain their winning streak. Benzema scored two goals to help Real record another victory at Athletic Bilbao. Against Málaga, Madrid came out with a goalless draw.

=== October ===
Real visited Atlético Madrid in the first Madrid Derby of the season. Benzema gave Real the lead, but the game eventually ended in a 1–1 draw.

Ronaldo became the all-time top goalscorer for Real Madrid with a goal in a 3–0 victory over Levante. Marcelo and Jesé scored the other goals.

Madrid faced Paris Saint-Germain in the Champions League and came away with a goalless draw, which extended Madrid's unbeaten group stage streak to three years.

In the top match of the ninth round, against Celta de Vigo, Madrid came away with a 3–1 victory, thanks to goals from Ronaldo, Marcelo and Danilo (his first goal as a Real player).

Goals from Isco, Ronaldo and Jesé wrapped up the month of October up with a 3–1 home win over Las Palmas.

=== November ===
The new month started with a narrow 1–0 victory against Paris Saint-Germain, which saw Madrid going through to the round of 16 in the Champions League. The lone goal was scored by Nacho.

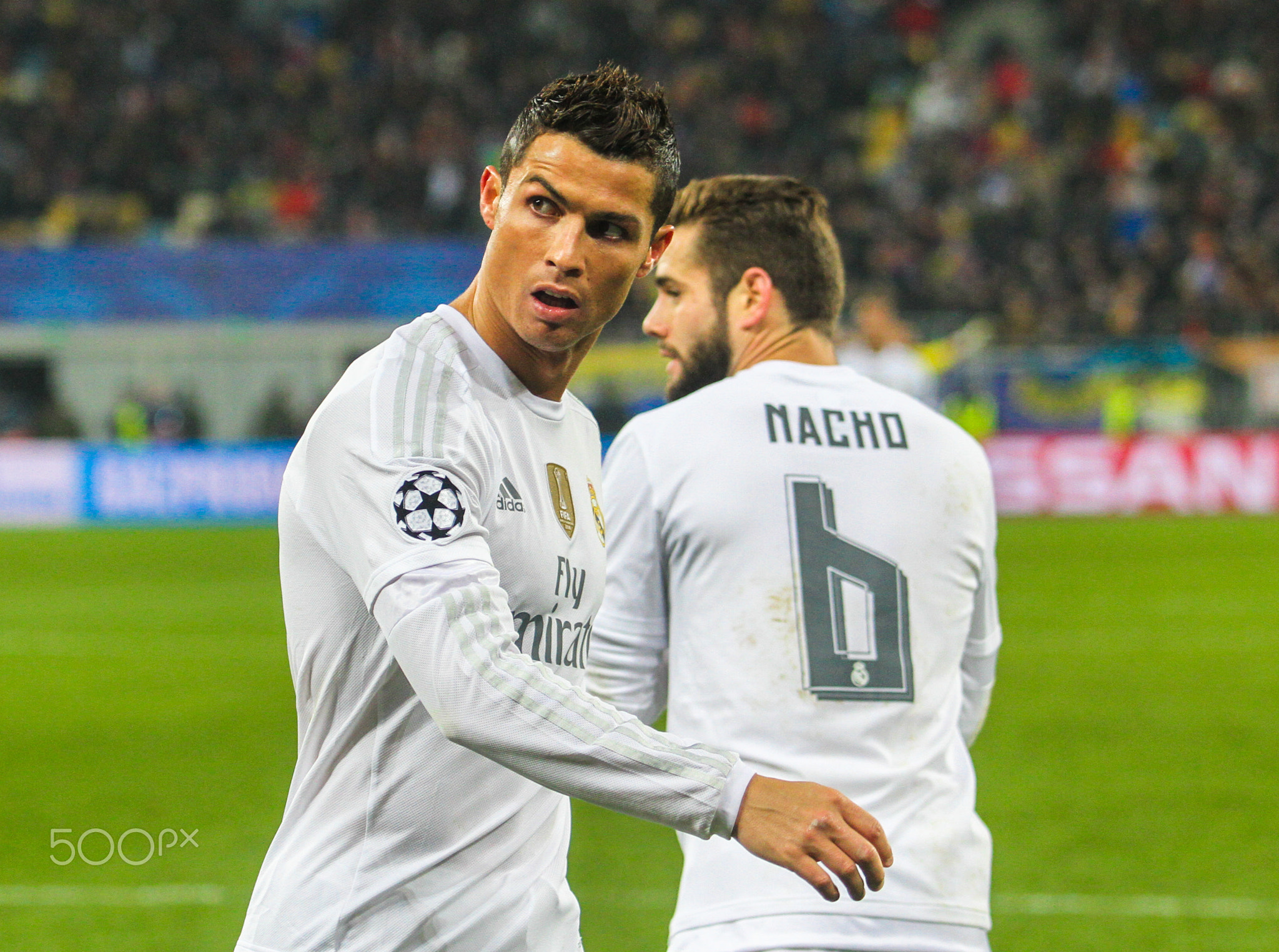
Ronaldo and Nacho in action during a UEFA Champions League match against Shakhtar Donetsk in November

Goals from Sergio Ramos and James Rodríguez were not enough to get by Sevilla, as Real lost the game 2–3 and the lead position of the table.

After the international break, Real hosted arch-rivals Barcelona and suffered a 0–4 loss, their heaviest defeat in El Clásico since 0–5 in 2010.

Madrid secured the top spot of their Champions League group by defeating Shakhtar Donetsk 4–3 away after a brace from Ronaldo and goals from Luka Modrić and Dani Carvajal.

Goals from Bale and Ronaldo snapped a two-game losing streak in the league with a 2–0 victory over Eibar.

=== December ===
Madrid started the cup season in style with a 3–1 victory over Cádiz by a brace from Isco and a goal from Denis Cheryshev. The match was controversial, however, as Cheryshev was suspended from the previous season for three yellow cards (when he was representing a different team) but played the game nonetheless due to an accounting mistake by Madrid officials. Real was disqualified from the 2015–16 Copa del Rey two days later by the competition judge despite protests from President Pérez.

A brace from Benzema and goals from Bale and Ronaldo gave Madrid the edge to win 4–1 over Getafe.

Four goals from Ronaldo, a hat-trick from Benzema and a goal from Mateo Kovačić wrapped up the group stage of the Champions League with an 8–0 thrashing of Malmö FF.

Madrid had a rough awakening back in La Liga when they lost 0–1 at Villarreal.

A record 10–2 victory over Rayo Vallecano helped Madrid to secure the third spot in the league table with four goals from Bale, a hat-trick from Benzema, a Ronaldo brace and a goal from Danilo.

Two goals from Ronaldo and a goal from Lucas Vázquez secured a 3–1 victory against Real Sociedad to end the year.

=== January ===
The new year started with a 2–2 draw at Valencia, with goals from Benzema and Bale securing ten-man Real Madrid a point.

On 4 January 2016, it was announced that Benítez was sacked and replaced by former assistant coach Zinedine Zidane.

The Zidane era was opened with a 5–0 win over Deportivo de La Coruña thanks to a hat-trick by Bale and a brace from Benzema.

Gijón was defeated 5–1 with braces from Ronaldo and Benzema plus a Bale goal.

A goal from Benzema was not enough in a 1–1 draw against Betis.

Real then thrashed Espanyol 6–0, with Ronaldo scoring a hat-trick and Rodríguez and Benzema adding the other goals alongside an own goal.

=== February ===
Cheryshev was loaned out to Valencia on 1 February 2016.

A late goal from Modrić saved the 2–1 win against Granada, after Benzema opened the scoring.

A stunning Ronaldo brace and goals from Rodríguez and Toni Kroos gave Madrid a 4–2 victory over Athletic Bilbao.

Against Roma in the Champions League round of 16, Ronaldo and Jesé helped Zidane to get off to a good start in Europe with a 2–0 win.

Madrid managed to get a 1–1 draw at Málaga with the goal being scored by Ronaldo.

The home match against Atlético Madrid was lost 0–1 and the gap to the first place blew to 12 points.

=== March ===
The new month was opened with a 3–1 victory at Levante with goals from Ronaldo, Isco and an own goal.

Four goals from Ronaldo and goals by Pepe, Bale and Jesé secured Madrid a 7–1 win over Celta Vigo.

Goals from Ronaldo and Rodríguez secured a 2–0 win over Roma (aggregate 4–0) in the round of 16 of the Champions League.

Casemiro secured the three points with a late goal, after Ramos initially put Madrid in the lead in a 2–1 away victory over Las Palmas.

Goals from Benzema, Ronaldo, Bale and Jesé secured Los Blancos a 4–0 win over Sevilla.

=== April ===
El Clásico was won 2–1 away from home with a Benzema equalizer and a late winner from Ronaldo, snapping Barcelona's 39-game unbeaten streak. Madrid outplayed Barça despite having been reduced to ten men in the second half with a Ramos red card and having a goal ruled out for a non-existent foul by Bale.

The first leg of the quarter-finals at the Champions League was lost 0–2 away from home to VfL Wolfsburg.

Against Eibar, Madrid was able to get a 4–0 victory with goals from Rodríguez, Vázquez, Ronaldo and Jesé.

In the penultimate home leg against Wolfsburg, a perfect Ronaldo hat-trick propelled Madrid's comeback, with a 3–0 home win overturning the deficit and ensuring a 3–2 aggregate victory. The result also signified Madrid's progression to their sixth consecutive Champions League semi-finals.

Benzema, Isco, Bale, Rodríguez and Ronaldo gave Madrid a 5–1 victory at Getafe.

Goals from Benzema, Vázquez and Modrić secured Madrid the three points in a 3–0 win over Villarreal.

A brace from Bale and a goal from Vázquez gave Madrid a comeback win against Rayo Vallecano after being down 0–2.

The first leg of the Champions League semi-finals against Manchester City ended in a goalless draw.

A Bale header gave Madrid a late 1–0 win at Real Sociedad.

=== May ===
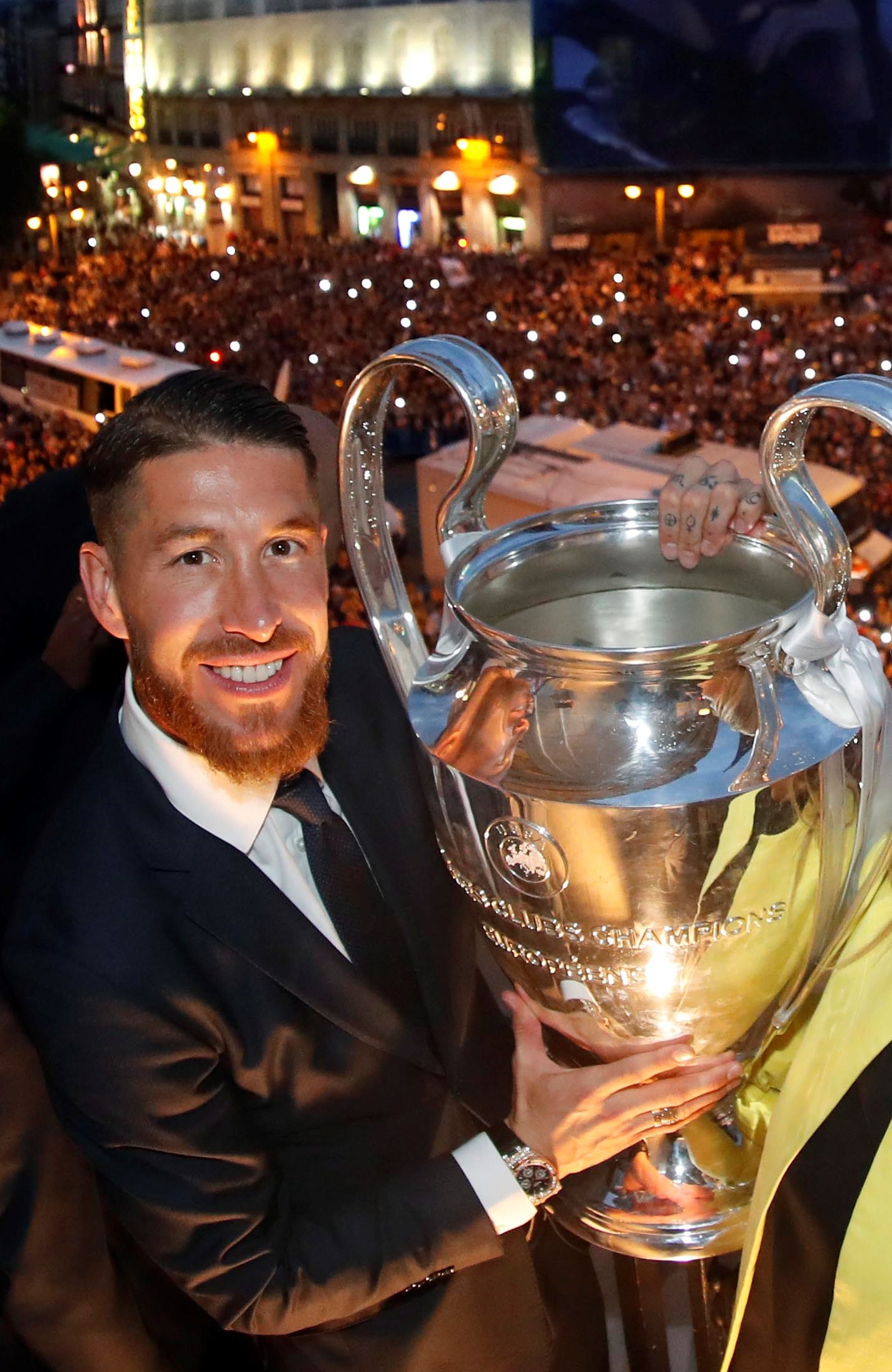

Fernando scored an own goal as Real Madrid progressed into the Champions League final by beating Manchester City, setting up a clash with neighbours Atlético Madrid for the second time in three years.

A brace from Ronaldo and a goal from Benzema secured a narrow 3–2 win over Valencia. With this win, Real moved up to second place in the league with a chance at the title.

Madrid won 2–0 at Deportivo thanks to another Ronaldo brace at the last matchday of the league. With that win, Madrid finished second, just a point behind league champions Barcelona, also producing a remarkable 12-game winning streak to conclude the campaign.

On 28 May 2016, Real Madrid's 11th Champions League title was won thanks to a 5–3 penalty shoot-out victory over Atlético Madrid after a 1–1 draw, with Ramos giving Real an early lead.

== Kits ==
Supplier: Adidas / Sponsor: Fly Emirates

Home	Away	Third	Third alt.	Goalkeeper 1	Goalkeeper 2

== Players ==
N	Pos.	Nat.	Name	Age	EU	Since	App	Goals	Ends	Transfer fee	Notes
1	GK	(Costa Rica)	Keylor Navas	28	EU	2014	46	0	2020	€10M	Second nationality: Spain
2	DF	(France)	Raphaël Varane	22	EU	2011	150	6	2020	€10M	
3	DF	(Portugal)	Pepe (2nd VC)	32	EU	2007	317	13	2017	€30M	Second nationality: Brazil
4	DF	(Spain)	Sergio Ramos (captain)	29	EU	2005	478	58	2020	€28M	
6	DF	(Spain)	Nacho	25	EU	2012	79	2	2021	Youth system	
7	FW	(Portugal)	Cristiano Ronaldo (3rd VC)	30	EU	2009	348	364	2018	€94M	
8	MF	(Germany)	Toni Kroos	25	EU	2014	101	3	2020	€25M	
9	FW	(France)	Karim Benzema	27	EU	2009	317	161	2019	€35M	Second nationality: Algeria
10	MF	(Colombia)	James Rodríguez	24	Non-EU	2014	78	25	2020	€80M	
11	FW	(Wales)	Gareth Bale	26	EU	2013	123	58	2019	€100M	
12	DF	(Brazil)	Marcelo (VC)	27	EU	2007 (Winter)	360	25	2020	€6.5M	Second nationality: Spain
13	GK	(Spain)	Kiko Casilla	28	EU	2015	7	0	2020	€6M	Originally from youth system
14	MF	(Brazil)	Casemiro	23	Non-EU	2013	60	2	2017	€6M	
15	DF	(Spain)	Dani Carvajal	23	EU	2013	118	3	2020	€6.5M	Originally from youth system
16	MF	(Croatia)	Mateo Kovačić	21	EU	2015	34	1	2021	€29M	
17	DF	(Spain)	Álvaro Arbeloa	32	EU	2009	237	6	2016	€4.5M	Originally from youth system
18	FW	(Spain)	Lucas Vázquez	24	EU	2015	33	4	2020	€1M	Originally from youth system
19	MF	(Croatia)	Luka Modrić	29	EU	2012	174	10	2018	€30M	
20	FW	(Spain)	Jesé	22	EU	2011	94	18	2018	Youth system	
22	MF	(Spain)	Isco	23	EU	2013	149	21	2018	€27M	
23	DF	(Brazil)	Danilo	24	Non-EU	2015	31	2	2021	€31.5M	
31	GK	(Spain)	Rubén Yáñez	21	EU	2015	0	0	2018	Youth system	

- Last updated: 28 May 2016
- Source: realmadrid.com
- Ordered by squad position.

== Transfers ==
=== In ===
No.	Pos.	Nat.	Name	Age	EU	Moving from	Type	Transfer window	Ends	Transfer fee	Source
13	GK	(Spain)	Kiko Casilla	28	EU	(Spain) Espanyol	Transfer	Summer	2020	€6M	Real Madrid CF
14	DM	(Brazil)	Casemiro	23	Non-EU	(Portugal) Porto	End of loan	Summer	2017	Free	Real Madrid CF
16	CM	(Croatia)	Mateo Kovačić	21	EU	(Italy) Internazionale	Transfer	Summer	2021	€29M	Real Madrid CF
18	RW	(Spain)	Lucas Vázquez	24	EU	(Spain) Espanyol	Buy-back clause	Summer	2020	€1M	Real Madrid CF
21	LW	(Russia)	Denis Cheryshev	24	EU	(Spain) Villarreal	End of loan	Summer	2021	Free	
23	RB	(Brazil)	Danilo	23	Non-EU	(Portugal) Porto	Transfer	Summer	2021	€31.5M	Real Madrid CF
31	GK	(Spain)	Rubén Yáñez	21	EU	(Spain) RM Castilla	Promotion	Summer	2016	Free	
	AM	(Spain)	Marco Asensio	19	EU	(Spain) Mallorca	Transfer	Summer	2021	€3.5M	Real Madrid CF
	CB	(Spain)	Jesús Vallejo	18	EU	(Spain) Real Zaragoza	Transfer	Summer	2021	€5M	Real Madrid CF

Total spending: ▼€83.5M

=== Out ===
No.	Pos.	Nat.	Name	Age	EU	Moving to	Type	Transfer window	Transfer fee	Source
1	GK	(Spain)	Iker Casillas	34	EU	(Portugal) Porto	Transfer	Summer	Free	FC Porto
5	LB	(Portugal)	Fábio Coentrão	27	EU	(France) Monaco	Loan	Summer	Loan	AS Monaco FC
6	DM	(Germany)	Sami Khedira	28	EU	(Italy) Juventus	End of contract	Summer	Free	Juventus F.C.
14	CF	(Mexico)	Javier Hernández	27	Non-EU	(England) Manchester United	End of loan	Summer	End of loan	Manchester United F.C.
16	DM	(Brazil)	Lucas Silva	22	Non-EU	(France) Marseille	Loan	Summer	€650K	Olympique de Marseille
24	DM	(Spain)	Asier Illarramendi	25	EU	(Spain) Real Sociedad	Transfer	Summer	€15M	Real Sociedad
25	GK	(Spain)	Fernando Pacheco	23	EU	(Spain) Alavés	Transfer	Summer	Free	Deportivo Alavés
	AM	(Spain)	Marco Asensio	19	EU	(Spain) Espanyol	Loan	Summer	Loan	RCD Espanyol
	CB	(Spain)	Jesús Vallejo	18	EU	(Spain) Real Zaragoza	Loan	Summer	Loan	Real Zaragoza
21	LW	(Russia)	Denis Cheryshev	25	EU	(Spain) Valencia	Loan	Winter	Loan	Valencia CF

Total income: ▲€15.65M Net income: ▼€67.85M

== Pre-season and friendlies ==
18 July 2015 1	Real Madrid	0–0 (6–7 p)	Roma	Melbourne, Australia
19:00 (UTC+10)		Report		Stadium: Melbourne Cricket Ground; Attendance: 80,746; Referee: Mark Clattenburg (England); Man of the Match: Gervinho
	Penalties
	Danilo (penalty scored); Kroos (penalty scored); Silva (penalty scored); Isco (penalty scored); Benzema (penalty scored); Nacho (penalty scored); Vázquez (penalty missed)		(penalty scored) Pjanić; (penalty scored) Ljajić; (penalty scored) Destro; (penalty scored) Florenzi; (penalty scored) Iturbe; (penalty scored) Paredes; (penalty scored) Keita

24 July 2015 2	Manchester City	1–4	Real Madrid	Melbourne, Australia
20:00 (UTC+10)	Touré 45+4' (pen.)	Report	Benzema 21'; Ronaldo 25'; Pepe 44'; Cheryshev 73'	Stadium: Melbourne Cricket Ground; Attendance: 99,382; Referee: Hiroyuki Kimura (Japan); Man of the Match: Cristiano Ronaldo

27 July 2015 3	Internazionale	0–3	Real Madrid	Guangzhou, China
20:00 (UTC+8)	Hernanes (yellow card) 53'; Juan (yellow card) 67'	Report	Jesé 29'; Varane 56'; Rodríguez 88'; Arbeloa (yellow card) 90'	Stadium: Tianhe Stadium; Attendance: 39,896; Referee: Fu Ming (China); Man of the Match: Isco

30 July 2015 4	Real Madrid	0–0 (10–9 p)	Milan	Shanghai, China
20:00 (UTC+8)		Report		Stadium: Shanghai Stadium; Referee: Di Wang (China); Man of the Match: Cristiano Ronaldo
	Penalties
	Rodríguez (penalty scored); Marcelo (penalty scored); Casemiro (penalty scored); Ramos (penalty scored); Kroos (penalty missed); Carvajal (penalty scored); Nacho (penalty scored); Cheryshev (penalty scored); Isco (penalty scored); Jesé (penalty scored); Casilla (penalty scored)		(penalty scored) De Jong; (penalty scored) Matri; (penalty missed) Bacca; (penalty scored) Honda; (penalty scored) Luiz Adriano; (penalty scored) Montolivo; (penalty scored) Zapata; (penalty scored) Mauri; (penalty scored) Calabria; (penalty scored) Paletta; (penalty missed) Donnarumma

4 August 2015 5	Real Madrid	2–0	Tottenham Hotspur	Munich, Germany
18:15 (UTC+2)	Rodríguez 36'; Ramos (yellow card) 55'; Bale 79'	Report		Stadium: Allianz Arena; Attendance: 71,000; Referee: Günter Perl (Germany); Man of the Match: James Rodríguez

5 August 2015 6	Bayern Munich	1–0	Real Madrid	Munich, Germany
20:45 (UTC+2)	Alonso (yellow card) 36'; Benatia (yellow card) 50'; Lewandowski 88'	Report	Marcelo (yellow card) 33'; Ramos (yellow card) 71'	Stadium: Allianz Arena; Attendance: 70,000; Referee: Felix Brych (Germany)

9 August 2015 7	Vålerenga	0–0	Real Madrid	Oslo, Norway
15:00 (UTC+2)		Report	Varane (yellow card) 63'	Stadium: Ullevaal Stadion; Attendance: 27,010; Referee: Svein Oddvar Moen (Norway)

18 August 2015 8	Real Madrid	2–1	Galatasaray	Madrid, Spain
22:30 (UTC+2)	Nacho 17'; Marcelo 81'	Report	Sneijder 53'	Stadium: Estadio Santiago Bernabéu

== Competitions ==
=== Overall ===
Competition	Started round	Final position / round	First match	Last match
La Liga	Matchday 1	Runners-up	23 August 2015	14 May 2016
Copa del Rey	Round of 32	Round of 32	2 December 2015	
UEFA Champions League	Group stage	Winners	15 September 2015	28 May 2016

Updated to match played 28 May 2016
Source: Competitions

=== Overview ===
Competition	Record							
Competition	Pld	W	D	L	GF	GA	GD	Win %
La Liga	38	28	6	4	110	34	+76	73.68
Copa del Rey	1	1	0	0	3	1	+2	100.00
Champions League	13	9	3	1	28	6	+22	69.23
Total	52	38	9	5	141	41	+100	73.08

Last updated: 28 May 2016
Source: Competitions

=== La Liga ===
==== League table ====
Pos	Team	Pld	W	D	L	GF	GA	GD	Pts	Qualification or relegation
1	Barcelona (C)	38	29	4	5	112	29	+83	91	Qualification for the Champions League group stage
2	Real Madrid	38	28	6	4	110	34	+76	90	Qualification for the Champions League group stage
3	Atlético Madrid	38	28	4	6	63	18	+45	88	Qualification for the Champions League group stage
4	Villarreal	38	18	10	10	44	35	+9	64	Qualification for the Champions League play-off round
5	Athletic Bilbao	38	18	8	12	58	45	+13	62	Qualification for the Europa League group stage (Note: Since the winners of the 2015–16 Copa del Rey, Barcelona, qualified for European competition based on league position, the spot awarded to the cup winners (Europa League group stage) was passed to the sixth-placed team and the spot awarded to the sixth-placed team (Europa League third qualifying round) was passed to the seventh-placed team.)

Source: La Liga, Soccerway
Rules for classification: 1) Points; 2) Head-to-head points; 3) Head-to-head goal difference; 4) Goal difference; 5) Goals scored; 6) Fair-play points; 7) Play-off.
(C) Champions

==== Results summary ====
Overall								Home						Away					
Pld	W	D	L	GF	GA	GD	Pts	W	D	L	GF	GA	GD	W	D	L	GF	GA	GD
38	28	6	4	110	34	+76	90	16	1	2	70	16	+54	12	5	2	40	18	+22

Last updated: 14 May 2016.
Source: LaLiga.es

==== Results by round ====
Round	1	2	3	4	5	6	7	8	9	10	11	12	13	14	15	16	17	18	19	20	21	22	23	24	25	26	27	28	29	30	31	32	33	34	35	36	37	38
Ground	A	H	A	H	A	H	A	H	A	H	A	H	A	H	A	H	H	A	H	H	A	H	A	H	A	H	A	H	A	H	A	H	A	H	A	A	H	A
Result	D	W	W	W	W	D	D	W	W	W	L	L	W	W	L	W	W	D	W	W	D	W	W	W	D	L	W	W	W	W	W	W	W	W	W	W	W	W
Position	11	5	2	2	1	3	2	1	1	1	2	3	3	3	3	3	3	3	3	3	3	3	3	3	3	3	3	3	3	3	3	3	3	3	3	3	2	2

Updated to match(es) played on 14 May 2016. Source: LaLiga.es
A = Away; H = Home; W = Win; D = Draw; L = Loss

==== Matches ====
Win Draw Loss

23 August 2015 1	Sporting Gijón	0–0	Real Madrid	Gijón
20:30 CEST (UTC+02:00)	Cases (yellow card) 36'; Carmona (yellow card) 66'; Jony (yellow card) 71'; Álvarez (yellow card) 74'	Report		Stadium: El Molinón; Attendance: 27,691; Referee: Xavier Estrada Fernández

29 August 2015 2	Real Madrid	5–0	Real Betis	Madrid
22:30 CEST (UTC+02:00)	Bale 2', 89'; Kroos (yellow card) 24'; Rodríguez 39', 50'; Benzema 47'; Varane (yellow card) 60'; Casemiro (yellow card) 86'	Report	Vargas (yellow card) 29'; Molinero (yellow card) 38'; Torres (yellow card) 92'	Stadium: Santiago Bernabéu; Attendance: 65,958; Referee: Alejandro José Hernández Hernández

12 September 2015 3	Espanyol	0–6	Real Madrid	Cornellà de Llobregat
16:00 CEST (UTC+02:00)	González (yellow card) 16'; Cañas (yellow card) 66'	Report	Ronaldo 7', 17' (pen.), 20', 61', 81'; Benzema 28', (yellow card) 36'; Kovačić (yellow card) 69'	Stadium: Cornellà-El Prat; Attendance: 27,395; Referee: Iñaki Vicandi Garrido

19 September 2015 4	Real Madrid	1–0	Granada	Madrid
16:00 CEST (UTC+02:00)	Isco (yellow card) 43'; Benzema 55'	Report	Édgar (yellow card) 35'; Márquez (yellow card) 70'; Krhin (yellow card) 80'	Stadium: Santiago Bernabéu; Attendance: 61,946; Referee: Juan Martínez Munuera

23 September 2015 5	Athletic Bilbao	1–2	Real Madrid	Bilbao
21:00 CEST (UTC+02:00)	Beñat (yellow card) 64'; De Marcos (yellow card) 66'; Merino 67'; Ibai (yellow card) 81'; García (yellow card) 90'	Report	Benzema 19', 70'; Ronaldo (yellow card) 52'; Pepe (yellow card) 57'; Kroos (yellow card) 78'	Stadium: San Mamés; Attendance: 43,487; Referee: Antonio Mateu Lahoz

26 September 2015 6	Real Madrid	0–0	Málaga	Madrid
18:15 CEST (UTC+02:00)	Varane (yellow card) 48'; Nacho (yellow card) 52'; Carvajal (yellow card) 89'; Ronaldo (yellow card) 90+4'	Report	Torres (yellow card) 27'; Recio (yellow card) 66'; Amrabat (red card) 77'; Juanpi (yellow card) 87'	Stadium: Santiago Bernabéu; Attendance: 75,361; Referee: José Luis González González

4 October 2015 7	Atlético Madrid	1–1	Real Madrid	Madrid
20:30 CEST (UTC+02:00)	Gabi (yellow card) 17'; Correa (yellow card) 39'; Juanfran (yellow card) 60'; Vietto (yellow card) 79', (goal) 83'; Griezmann (yellow card) 82'; Godín (yellow card) 88'	Report	Benzema 9'; Ramos (yellow card) 21'; Varane (yellow card) 59'; Arbeloa (yellow card) 89'	Stadium: Vicente Calderón; Attendance: 51,933; Referee: Alberto Undiano Mallenco

17 October 2015 8	Real Madrid	3–0	Levante	Madrid
16:00 CEST (UTC+02:00)	Marcelo 27'; Ronaldo 30'; Kovačić (yellow card) 45'; Jesé 82'	Report	Feddal (yellow card) 13'; Morales (yellow card) 38'; Deyverson (yellow card) 48'; José Mari (yellow card) 58'	Stadium: Santiago Bernabéu; Attendance: 63,476; Referee: José María Sánchez Martínez

24 October 2015 9	Celta Vigo	1–3	Real Madrid	Vigo
16:00 CET (UTC+01:00)	Cabral (yellow card) 37' (yellow-red card) 57'; Fernández (yellow card) 57'; Hernández (yellow card) 57'; Aspas (yellow card) 57'; Nolito (yellow card) 61', (goal) 85'	Report	Ronaldo 8'; Danilo 23'; Vázquez (yellow card) 52'; Marcelo 90+5'	Stadium: Balaídos; Attendance: 24,519; Referee: Carlos Clos Gómez

31 October 2015 10	Real Madrid	3–1	Las Palmas	Madrid
16:00 CET (UTC+01:00)	Isco 4'; Ronaldo 14'; Jesé 43'	Report	Hernán (yellow card) 30', (goal) 38'; Gómez (yellow card) 51'; Artiles (yellow card) 93'	Stadium: Santiago Bernabéu; Attendance: 69,822; Referee: Santiago Jaime Latre

8 November 2015 11	Sevilla	3–2	Real Madrid	Seville
20:30 CET (UTC+01:00)	Immobile 36', (yellow card) 37'; Banega 61'; Llorente 74'	Report	Nacho (yellow card) 5'; Ramos 22'; Rodríguez 90+3'	Stadium: Ramón Sánchez Pizjuán; Attendance: 40,395; Referee: José Luis González González

21 November 2015 12	Real Madrid	0–4	Barcelona	Madrid
18:15 CET (UTC+01:00)	Rodríguez (yellow card) 23'; Ramos (yellow card) 51'; Carvajal (yellow card) 83'; Isco (red card) 84'	Report	Suárez 11', 74'; Dani Alves (yellow card) 31'; Neymar 39'; Iniesta 53'; Busquets (yellow card) 90+2'	Stadium: Santiago Bernabéu; Attendance: 80,148; Referee: David Fernández Borbalán

29 November 2015 13	Eibar	0–2	Real Madrid	Eibar
16:00 CET (UTC+01:00)	Mauro (yellow card) 31'; Escalante (yellow card) 89'; Verdi (yellow card) 93'	Report	Kovačić (yellow card) 37'; Bale 42', (yellow card) 63'; Pepe (yellow card) 61'; Vázquez (yellow card) 77'; Ronaldo 82' (pen.)	Stadium: Ipurua Municipal Stadium; Attendance: 5,892; Referee: Jesús Gil Manzano

5 December 2015 14	Real Madrid	4–1	Getafe	Madrid
16:00 CET (UTC+01:00)	Benzema 4', 16'; Bale 35'; Danilo (yellow card) 37'; Ronaldo 38'	Report	Alexis 70'	Stadium: Santiago Bernabéu; Attendance: 64,897; Referee: Antonio Mateu Lahoz

13 December 2015 15	Villarreal	1–0	Real Madrid	Villarreal
20:30 CET (UTC+01:00)	Soldado 9'; Bailly (yellow card) 72'; Suárez (yellow card) 92'	Report	Marcelo (yellow card) 31'; Ramos (yellow card) 66'	Stadium: El Madrigal; Attendance: 19,477; Referee: Alberto Undiano Mallenco

20 December 2015 16	Real Madrid	10–2	Rayo Vallecano	Madrid
16:00 CET (UTC+01:00)	Danilo 3', (yellow card) 72'; Bale 25', 41', 61', 70'; Ronaldo 30' (pen.), 53'; Benzema 48', 79', 90'	Report	Amaya 10'; Jozabed 12'; Tito (red card) 14'; Trashorras (yellow card) 15'; Baena (yellow card) 19' (yellow-red card) 28'; Nacho (yellow card) 27'	Stadium: Santiago Bernabéu; Attendance: 61,564; Referee: Ignacio Iglesias Villanueva

30 December 2015 17	Real Madrid	3–1	Real Sociedad	Madrid
16:00 CET (UTC+01:00)	Ronaldo 42' (pen.), 67'; Nacho (yellow card) 56'; Vázquez 86'	Report	Jonathas (yellow card) 24'; Berchiche (yellow card) 32'; C. Martínez (yellow card) 40'; Bruma 49'; Illarramendi (yellow card) 62'	Stadium: Santiago Bernabéu; Attendance: 60,907; Referee: José Luis González González

3 January 2016 18	Valencia	2–2	Real Madrid	Valencia
20:30 CET (UTC+01:00)	Parejo 45+1' (pen.); Barragán (yellow card) 57'; Alcácer 83'	Report	Benzema 16'; Pepe (yellow card) 45'; Kovačić (red card) 68'; Bale 82'	Stadium: Mestalla; Attendance: 47,217; Referee: José María Sánchez Martínez

9 January 2016 19	Real Madrid	5–0	Deportivo La Coruña	Madrid
20:30 CET (UTC+01:00)	Benzema 15', 90+1'; Bale 22', 49', 63'	Report	Lux (yellow card) 15'; Mosquera (yellow card) 64'; Arribas (yellow card) 60'	Stadium: Santiago Bernabéu; Attendance: 71,267; Referee: Pedro Jesús Pérez Montero

17 January 2016 20	Real Madrid	5–1	Sporting Gijón	Madrid
16:00 CET (UTC+01:00)	Bale 7'; Ronaldo 9', 18'; Benzema 12', 41'; Modrić (yellow card) 58'	Report	Guerrero (yellow card) 49'; López 62'	Stadium: Santiago Bernabéu; Attendance: 70,365; Referee: Alberto Undiano Mallenco

24 January 2016 21	Real Betis	1–1	Real Madrid	Seville
20:30 CET (UTC+01:00)	Cejudo 7'; Vargas (yellow card) 58'; Petros (yellow card) 61'; Molinero (yellow card) 69'	Report	Danilo (yellow card) 64'; Benzema 71'; Carvajal (yellow card) 90+2'	Stadium: Benito Villamarín; Attendance: 45,162; Referee: Juan Martínez Munuera

31 January 2016 22	Real Madrid	6–0	Espanyol	Madrid
20:30 CET (UTC+01:00)	Benzema 7'; Ronaldo 12' (pen.), 45', 82'; Rodríguez 16'; Duarte 86' (o.g.)	Report	Pérez (yellow card) 11'; Diop (yellow card) 37'; J. López (yellow card) 42'; Sylla (yellow card) 42'; Álvaro (yellow card) 77'	Stadium: Santiago Bernabéu; Attendance: 65,768; Referee: Alejandro José Hernández Hernández

7 February 2016 23	Granada	1–2	Real Madrid	Granada
20:30 CET (UTC+01:00)	Lopes (yellow card) 19'; Pérez (yellow card) 32'; El-Arabi 60', (yellow card) 61'	Report	Benzema 30'; Ramos (yellow card) 62'; Carvajal (yellow card) 83'; Modrić 85'	Stadium: Nuevo Los Cármenes; Attendance: 17,060; Referee: Jesús Gil Manzano

13 February 2016 24	Real Madrid	4–2	Athletic Bilbao	Madrid
16:00 CET (UTC+01:00)	Ronaldo 3', 87'; Varane (yellow card) 16' (yellow-red card) 83'; Rodríguez 37'; Kroos 45'; Modrić (yellow card) 71'	Report	Eraso 10'; Etxeita (yellow card) 14'; Balenziaga (yellow card) 43'; Elustondo 90'	Stadium: Santiago Bernabéu; Attendance: 70,100; Referee: Alfonso J. Álvarez Izquierdo

21 February 2016 25	Málaga	1–1	Real Madrid	Málaga
16:00 CET (UTC+01:00)	Torres (yellow card) 2'; Weligton (yellow card) 35'; Juanpi (yellow card) 41'; Camacho (yellow card) 55'; Albentosa 66'; Kameni (yellow card) 90'	Report	Marcelo (yellow card) 24'; Ronaldo 33'; Modrić (yellow card) 71'	Stadium: La Rosaleda; Attendance: 28,290; Referee: Ignacio Iglesias Villanueva

27 February 2016 26	Real Madrid	0–1	Atlético Madrid	Madrid
16:00 CET (UTC+01:00)	Vázquez (yellow card) 62'; Carvajal (yellow card) 90+1'; Ramos (yellow card) 90+2'	Report	Godín (yellow card) 31'; Filipe Luís (yellow card) 37'; Griezmann 53'; Giménez (yellow card) 72'; Correa (yellow card) 90+1'	Stadium: Santiago Bernabéu; Attendance: 74,258; Referee: Carlos Clos Gómez

2 March 2016 27	Levante	1–3	Real Madrid	Valencia
21:00 CET (UTC+01:00)	Deyverson 39'; Simão Mate (yellow card) 42'; García (yellow card) 79'	Report	Ronaldo 34' (pen.); Mariño 38' (o.g.); Vázquez (yellow card) 39'; Isco 90+2'	Stadium: Ciutat de València; Attendance: 18,985; Referee: Ricardo de Burgos Bengoetxea

5 March 2016 28	Real Madrid	7–1	Celta Vigo	Madrid
16:00 CET (UTC+01:00)	Danilo (yellow card) 25'; Pepe (yellow card) 29', (goal) 41'; Ronaldo 50', 58', 64', 76'; Jesé 77'; Bale 81'	Report	Nolito (yellow card) 40'; Jonny (yellow card) 59'; Aspas 62'; Orellana (yellow card) 85'	Stadium: Santiago Bernabéu; Attendance: 64,432; Referee: Jesús Gil Manzano

13 March 2016 29	Las Palmas	1–2	Real Madrid	Las Palmas
19:30 WET (UTC±00:00)	Montoro (yellow card) 38'; Lemos (yellow card) 56'; Bigas (yellow card) 60'; Viera (yellow card) 75'; Willian José 87'	Report	Casemiro (yellow card) 16', (goal) 89'; Ramos 24', (yellow card) 55' (yellow-red card) 90'; Isco (yellow card) 55'; Pepe (yellow card) 61'	Stadium: Gran Canaria; Attendance: 25,846; Referee: David Fernández Borbalán

20 March 2016 30	Real Madrid	4–0	Sevilla	Madrid
20:30 CET (UTC+01:00)	Benzema 6'; Varane (yellow card) 26'; Casemiro (yellow card) 54'; Ronaldo 64'; Bale 66'; Jesé 86'	Report	Reyes (yellow card) 57'; Krychowiak (yellow card) 62'	Stadium: Santiago Bernabéu; Attendance: 68,782; Referee: Xavier Estrada Fernández

2 April 2016 31	Barcelona	1–2	Real Madrid	Barcelona
20:30 CEST (UTC+02:00)	Suárez (yellow card) 27'; Mascherano (yellow card) 29'; Piqué 56'; Rakitić (yellow card) 59'	Report	Ramos (yellow card) 10' (yellow-red card) 83'; Carvajal (yellow card) 18'; Benzema 62'; Ronaldo (yellow card) 80', (goal) 85'	Stadium: Camp Nou; Attendance: 98,902; Referee: Alejandro José Hernández Hernández

9 April 2016 32	Real Madrid	4–0	Eibar	Madrid
16:00 CEST (UTC+02:00)	Rodríguez 5'; Vázquez 18'; Ronaldo 19'; Jesé 39'; Danilo (yellow card) 78'	Report	García (yellow card) 3'; Escalante (yellow card) 62'; Ramis (yellow card) 68'	Stadium: Santiago Bernabéu; Attendance: 66,214; Referee: José María Sánchez Martínez

16 April 2016 33	Getafe	1–5	Real Madrid	Getafe
16:00 CEST (UTC+02:00)	Suárez (yellow card) 43'; Vázquez (yellow card) 61'; León (yellow card) 78'; Gómez (yellow card) 81'; Sarabia 84'	Report	Benzema 29'; Isco 40'; Bale 50'; Rodríguez 88'; Nacho (yellow card) 90'; Ronaldo 90+2'	Stadium: Coliseum Alfonso Pérez; Attendance: 10,951; Referee: Jose Luis González

20 April 2016 34	Real Madrid	3–0	Villarreal	Madrid
22:00 CEST (UTC+02:00)	Benzema 41'; Danilo (yellow card) 45'; Vázquez 69'; Modrić 76'; Casemiro (yellow card) 86'	Report	Trigueros (yellow card) 44'	Stadium: Santiago Bernabéu; Attendance: 62,085; Referee: Carlos Clos Gómez

23 April 2016 35	Rayo Vallecano	2–3	Real Madrid	Madrid
16:00 CEST (UTC+02:00)	Embarba 7'; Miku 14'; Jozabed (yellow card) 53'; Crespo (yellow card) 62'; Iturra (yellow card) 68'; Trashorras (yellow card) 73'; Amaya (yellow card) 77'; Raț (yellow card) 83'	Report	Bale 35', 81'; Vázquez 52'; Kovačić (yellow card) 67'	Stadium: Campo de Fútbol de Vallecas; Attendance: 13,134; Referee: Alejandro José Hernández Hernández

30 April 2016 36	Real Sociedad	0–1	Real Madrid	San Sebastián
16:00 CEST (UTC+02:00)	Illarramendi (yellow card) 36'; Bergara (yellow card) 42'; Prieto (yellow card) 48'; Zaldúa (yellow card) 64'	Report	Bale (yellow card) 41', (goal) 80'; Ramos (yellow card) 59'; Nacho (yellow card) 62'; Modrić (yellow card) 75'	Stadium: Anoeta; Attendance: 26,381; Referee: Alberto Undiano Mallenco

8 May 2016 37	Real Madrid	3–2	Valencia	Madrid
17:00 CEST (UTC+02:00)	Ronaldo 28', 58'; Benzema 42'; Casemiro (yellow card) 52'	Report	Pérez (yellow card) 13'; Siqueira (yellow card) 39'; Gomes (yellow card) 43', (goal) 81'; Rodrigo 55', (red card) 83'; Fuego (yellow card) 69'	Stadium: Santiago Bernabéu; Attendance: 68,903; Referee: David Fernández Borbalán

14 May 2016 38	Deportivo La Coruña	0–2	Real Madrid	A Coruña
17:00 CEST (UTC+02:00)	Mosquera (yellow card) 57'	Report	Ronaldo 8', 25'; Kroos (yellow card) 50'; Ramos (yellow card) 86'; Marcelo (yellow card) 90'	Stadium: Riazor; Attendance: 28,017; Referee: Antonio Mateu Lahoz

=== Copa del Rey ===
==== Round of 32 ====
Win Draw Loss

2 December 2015 First leg	Cádiz	1–3	Real Madrid	Cádiz
22:00 CET (UTC+01:00)	Lolo (yellow card) 53'; Garrido (yellow card) 58'; Kike 88'	Report	Cheryshev 3'; Isco 65', 74'	Stadium: Ramón de Carranza; Attendance: 17,224; Referee: Ricardo de Burgos Bengoetxea

16 December 2015 Second leg	Real Madrid	Cancelled (w/o)	Cádiz	Madrid
21:00 CET (UTC+01:00)		Report		Stadium: Santiago Bernabéu
Note: Madrid was disqualified for fielding an ineligible player, Denis Cheryshev, as he was suspended (while playing for Villarreal CF the previous season) but did appear in the first leg due to officials' mistake.

=== UEFA Champions League ===
==== Group stage ====
Pos	Team	Pld	W	D	L	GF	GA	GD	Pts	Qualification	RMA	PAR	SHK	MAL
1	(Spain) Real Madrid	6	5	1	0	19	3	+16	16	Advance to knockout phase	—	1–0	4–0	8–0
2	(France) Paris Saint-Germain	6	4	1	1	12	1	+11	13	Advance to knockout phase	0–0	—	2–0	2–0
3	(Ukraine) Shakhtar Donetsk	6	1	0	5	7	14	−7	3	Transfer to Europa League	3–4	0–3	—	4–0
4	(Sweden) Malmö FF	6	1	0	5	1	21	−20	3		0–2	0–5	1–0	—

Source: UEFA

Win Draw Loss

15 September 2015 1	Real Madrid (Spain)	4–0	(Ukraine) Shakhtar Donetsk	Madrid, Spain
20:45 CEST (UTC+02:00)	Benzema 30'; Ronaldo 55' (pen.), 63' (pen.), 81'	Report	Stepanenko (yellow card) 32' (yellow-red card) 50'; Srna (yellow card) 54'; Kucher (yellow card) 75'; Malyshev (yellow card) 80'	Stadium: Santiago Bernabéu; Attendance: 66,389; Referee: Ivan Bebek (Croatia)

30 September 2015 2	Malmö FF (Sweden)	0–2	(Spain) Real Madrid	Malmö, Sweden
20:45 CEST (UTC+02:00)	Rosenberg (yellow card) 21'; Berget (yellow card) 36'; Yotún (yellow card) 36' (yellow-red card) 78'	Report	Kovačić (yellow card) 11'; Ronaldo 29', 90'; Casemiro (yellow card) 37'; Isco (yellow card) 75'	Stadium: Swedbank Stadion; Attendance: 20,500; Referee: Cüneyt Çakır (Turkey)

21 October 2015 3	Paris Saint-Germain (France)	0–0	(Spain) Real Madrid	Paris, France
20:45 CEST (UTC+02:00)	Matuidi (yellow card) 9'; Verratti (yellow card) 50'; Aurier (yellow card) 87'	Report	Ramos (yellow card) 60'; Vázquez (yellow card) 77'; Cheryshev (yellow card) 86'	Stadium: Parc des Princes; Attendance: 46,858; Referee: Nicola Rizzoli (Italy)

3 November 2015 4	Real Madrid (Spain)	1–0	(France) Paris Saint-Germain	Madrid, Spain
20:45 CET (UTC+01:00)	Nacho 35'; Casemiro (yellow card) 88'; Navas (yellow card) 90+2'	Report	Aurier (yellow card) 45'; David Luiz (yellow card) 67'	Stadium: Santiago Bernabéu; Attendance: 78,300; Referee: Mark Clattenburg (England)

25 November 2015 5	Shakhtar Donetsk (Ukraine)	3–4	(Spain) Real Madrid	Lviv, Ukraine
20:45 CET (UTC+01:00)	Stepanenko (yellow card) 35'; Teixeira 77' (pen.), 88'; Dentinho 83'	Report	Ronaldo 18', 70'; Carvajal (yellow card) 48', (goal) 52'; Modrić 50'; Danilo (yellow card) 87'	Stadium: Arena Lviv; Attendance: 33,990; Referee: Bas Nijhuis (Netherlands)

8 December 2015 6	Real Madrid (Spain)	8–0	(Sweden) Malmö FF	Madrid, Spain
20:45 CET (UTC+01:00)	Benzema 12', 24', 74'; Ronaldo 39', 47', 50', 59'; Kovačić 70'	Report		Stadium: Santiago Bernabéu; Attendance: 60,663; Referee: Daniele Orsato (Italy)

==== Knockout phase ====
===== Round of 16 =====
17 February 2016 First leg	Roma (Italy)	0–2	(Spain) Real Madrid	Rome, Italy
20:45 CET (UTC+01:00)		Report	Ronaldo 57'; Varane (yellow card) 62'; Ramos (yellow card) 85'; Jesé 86'	Stadium: Stadio Olimpico; Attendance: 55,612; Referee: Pavel Královec (Czech Republic)

8 March 2016 Second leg	Real Madrid (Spain)	2–0 (4–0 agg.)	(Italy) Roma	Madrid, Spain
20:45 CET (UTC+01:00)	Danilo (yellow card) 37'; Ronaldo 64'; Rodríguez 68'	Report	Zukanović (yellow card) 76'	Stadium: Santiago Bernabéu; Attendance: 76,654; Referee: Szymon Marciniak (Poland)

===== Quarter-finals =====
6 April 2016 First leg	VfL Wolfsburg (Germany)	2–0	(Spain) Real Madrid	Wolfsburg, Germany
20:45 CET (UTC+02:00)	Rodríguez 18' (pen.); Vieirinha (yellow card) 19'; Arnold 25', (yellow card) 69'; Benaglio (yellow card) 50'; Luiz Gustavo (yellow card) 61'	Report	Bale (yellow card) 69'	Stadium: Volkswagen Arena; Attendance: 26,400; Referee: Gianluca Rocchi (Italy)

12 April 2016 Second leg	Real Madrid (Spain)	3–0 (3–2 agg.)	(Germany) VfL Wolfsburg	Madrid, Spain
20:45 CET (UTC+02:00)	Ronaldo 15', 17', 77', (yellow card) 80'	Report	Arnold (yellow card) 45'; Luiz Gustavo (yellow card) 76'; Dante (yellow card) 85'; Vieirinha (yellow card) 90'	Stadium: Santiago Bernabéu; Attendance: 76,684; Referee: Viktor Kassai (Hungary)

===== Semi-finals =====
26 April 2016 First leg	Manchester City (England)	0–0	(Spain) Real Madrid	Manchester, England
20:45 CET (UTC+02:00)	Silva (yellow card) 38'	Report	Pepe (yellow card) 24'; Carvajal (yellow card) 90'	Stadium: City of Manchester Stadium; Attendance: 52,221; Referee: Cüneyt Çakir (Turkey)

4 May 2016 Second leg	Real Madrid (Spain)	1–0 (1–0 agg.)	(England) Manchester City	Madrid, Spain
20:45 CET (UTC+02:00)	Fernando 20' (o.g.); Vázquez (yellow card) 83'	Report	De Bruyne (yellow card) 30'; Fernando (yellow card) 71'; Otamendi (yellow card) 90+4'	Stadium: Santiago Bernabéu; Attendance: 78,300; Referee: Damir Skomina (Slovenia)

===== Final =====
28 May 2016 Final	Real Madrid (Spain)	1–1 (a.e.t.) (5–3 p)	(Spain) Atlético Madrid	Milan, Italy
20:45 CEST (UTC+02:00)	Carvajal (yellow card) 11'; Ramos 15', (yellow card) 90+3'; Navas (yellow card) 47'; Casemiro (yellow card) 79'; Danilo (yellow card) 93'; Pepe (yellow card) 112'	Report	Torres (yellow card) 61'; Carrasco 79'; Gabi (yellow card) 90+3'	Stadium: San Siro; Attendance: 71,942; Referee: Mark Clattenburg (England)
	Penalties
	Vázquez (penalty scored); Marcelo (penalty scored); Bale (penalty scored); Ramos (penalty scored); Ronaldo (penalty scored)		(penalty scored) Griezmann; (penalty scored) Gabi; (penalty scored) Saúl; (penalty missed) Juanfran

== Statistics ==
=== Squad statistics ===
No.	Pos	Nat	Player	Total		La Liga		Copa del Rey		Champions League	
No.	Pos	Nat	Player	Apps	Goals	Apps	Goals	Apps	Goals	Apps	Goals
1	GK	(Costa Rica) CRC	Keylor Navas	45	0	34	0	0	0	11	0
23	DF	(Brazil) BRA	Danilo	31	2	23+1	2	0	0	5+2	0
4	DF	(Spain) ESP	Sergio Ramos	33	3	23	2	0	0	10	1
2	DF	(France) FRA	Raphaël Varane	33	0	23+3	0	0	0	6+1	0
12	DF	(Brazil) BRA	Marcelo	41	2	28+2	2	0	0	10+1	0
19	MF	(Croatia) CRO	Luka Modrić	44	3	31+1	2	0	0	10+2	1
8	MF	(Germany) GER	Toni Kroos	44	1	32	1	0	0	11+1	0
22	MF	(Spain) ESP	Isco	43	5	21+10	3	1	2	8+3	0
7	FW	(Portugal) POR	Cristiano Ronaldo	48	51	36	35	0	0	12	16
9	FW	(France) FRA	Karim Benzema	36	28	26+1	24	0	0	8+1	4
11	FW	(Wales) WAL	Gareth Bale	31	19	21+2	19	0	0	8	0
13	GK	(Spain) ESP	Kiko Casilla	7	0	4	0	1	0	2	0
3	DF	(Portugal) POR	Pepe	31	1	21	1	1	0	8+1	0
15	DF	(Spain) ESP	Dani Carvajal	31	1	19+4	0	0	0	8	1
10	MF	(Colombia) COL	James Rodríguez	32	8	17+9	7	1	0	3+2	1
14	MF	(Brazil) BRA	Casemiro	35	1	17+6	1	1	0	10+1	0
6	DF	(Spain) ESP	Nacho	22	1	12+4	0	1	0	3+2	1
18	FW	(Spain) ESP	Lucas Vázquez	31	4	10+13	4	1	0	2+5	0
16	MF	(Croatia) CRO	Mateo Kovačić	34	1	8+17	0	1	0	3+5	1
20	FW	(Spain) ESP	Jesé	38	6	7+21	5	1	0	3+6	1
29	FW	(Spain) ESP	Borja Mayoral	6	0	3+3	0	0	0	0	0
17	DF	(Spain) ESP	Álvaro Arbeloa	9	0	2+4	0	1	0	2	0
21	MF	(Russia) RUS	Denis Cheryshev	6	1	0+2	0	1	1	0+3	0
28	MF	(Spain) ESP	Marcos Llorente	3	0	0+2	0	1	0	0	0
31	GK	(Spain) ESP	Rubén Yáñez	0	0	0	0	0	0	0	0
32	DF	(Austria) AUT	Philipp Lienhart	1	0	0	0	1	0	0	0
34	DF	(Spain) ESP	Álvaro Tejero	1	0	0	0	1	0	0	0

Players who left the club during the season yet had made at least one appearance in competitive matches are in italics

=== Goals ===
Rank	Player	Position	La Liga	Copa del Rey	UEFA CL	Total
1	(Portugal) Cristiano Ronaldo	FW	35	0	16	51
2	(France) Karim Benzema	FW	24	0	4	28
3	(Wales) Gareth Bale	MF	19	0	0	19
4	(Colombia) James Rodríguez	MF	7	0	1	8
5	(Spain) Jesé	FW	5	0	1	6
6	(Spain) Isco	MF	3	2	0	5
7	(Spain) Lucas Vázquez	FW	4	0	0	4
8	(Croatia) Luka Modrić	MF	2	0	1	3
8	(Spain) Sergio Ramos	DF	2	0	1	3
10	(Brazil) Danilo	DF	2	0	0	2
10	(Brazil) Marcelo	DF	2	0	0	2
12	(Spain) Dani Carvajal	DF	0	0	1	1
12	(Brazil) Casemiro	MF	1	0	0	1
12	(Russia) Denis Cheryshev	MF	0	1	0	1
12	(Croatia) Mateo Kovačić	MF	0	0	1	1
12	(Germany) Toni Kroos	MF	1	0	0	1
12	(Spain) Nacho	DF	0	0	1	1
12	(Portugal) Pepe	DF	1	0	0	1
Own goals			2	0	1	3
Total			110	3	28	141

=== Disciplinary record ===
N	P	Nat.	Name	La Liga			Copa del Rey			UEFA CL			Total			Notes
N	P	Nat.	Name	Yellow card	Second yellow card	Red card	Yellow card	Second yellow card	Red card	Yellow card	Second yellow card	Red card	Yellow card	Second yellow card	Red card	Notes
4	DF	(Spain)	Sergio Ramos	7	2					3			10	2		
14	MF	(Brazil)	Casemiro	6						3			9			
15	DF	(Spain)	Dani Carvajal	6						3			9			
23	DF	(Brazil)	Danilo	6						2			8			
3	DF	(Portugal)	Pepe	5						2			7			
16	MF	(Croatia)	Mateo Kovačić	5		1				1			6		1	
2	DF	(France)	Raphaël Varane	4	1					1			5	1		
6	DF	(Spain)	Nacho	5									5			
18	MF	(Spain)	Lucas Vázquez	3						2			5			
19	MF	(Croatia)	Luka Modrić	5									5			
22	MF	(Spain)	Isco	2		1				1			3		1	
7	MF	(Portugal)	Cristiano Ronaldo	2						1			3			
8	MF	(Germany)	Toni Kroos	3									3			
12	DF	(Brazil)	Marcelo	3									3			
1	GK	(Costa Rica)	Keylor Navas							2			2			
11	FW	(Wales)	Gareth Bale	1						1			2			
9	FW	(France)	Karim Benzema	1									1			
10	MF	(Colombia)	James Rodríguez							1			1			
17	DF	(Spain)	Álvaro Arbeloa	1									1			
21	MF	(Russia)	Denis Cheryshev							1			1			

Last updated: 28 May 2016
Source: Matches
Only competitive matches
(yellow card) = Number of bookings; (second yellow card) = Number of sending offs after a second yellow card; (red card) = Number of sending offs by a direct red card.
