= Saraiva (surname) =

Saraiva is a Portuguese surname, which has also been Hispanicized as Saravia. Notable people with the surname Saraiva include:

- António Saraiva (1934–2018), simply known by mononym Saraiva, Portuguese footballer
- Bernardo Saraiva (born 1993), Portuguese tennis player
- Ivan Saraiva de Souza (born 1982), Brazilian left back
- João Victor Saraiva (born 1977), Portuguese beach soccer player
- José Antônio Saraiva (1823–1895), Brazilian politician, diplomat and lawyer
- José Hermano Saraiva (1919–2012), Portuguese historian and diplomat
- José Saraiva Martins (born 1932), Portuguese cleric and cardinal
- Otelo Saraiva de Carvalho, GCL (1936–2021), Portuguese military officer
- Ramiro Saraiva Guerreiro (1918–2011), Brazilian politician

== See also ==
- Saraiva
