= Football Paradise =

- Website type: Football blog
- Available in: English
- Headquarters: Mumbai, {{{location_country}}}
- Owner: Football Paradise LLP
- Creators: List of contributors: Gaurang Manjrekar; Srijandeep Das; Anushree Nande; Sarthak Dev; Taronish Elavia; Parashar Thanki; Abhijeet Barve; Santokie Nagulendran; Debkalpa Banerjee; Ved Sen; Vikrant Hatwalne; Ashay Kapse; Amit Mishra; Arka Tarun Mukherjee; Taha Memon; Parth Rajwade; Varun Manjunatha; Abhishek Deodhar; Juuso Kilpeläinen; Samiran Mishra; Ryan Gaur
- Founder: Gaurang Manjrekar
- Website: footballparadise.com
- Launched: 2008; 18 years ago
- Current status: Online

Football Paradise is an association football blog that focusses on feature articles on European football, book reviews, and interviews. It has received two Football Blogging Award nominations for Best International Blog (in 2016 and 2018), winning the Judges’ Choice Award in 2016. After the win, Vijay Goel, the Honourable Minister for Youth Affairs and Sports of India commended Football Paradise on social media and personally invited the editorial team “to discuss football and ways to boost the game in India”.
