= Saraiva =

Saraiva may refer to:

- Saraiva (surname), a Portuguese surname
- Saraiva Law, law that reformed the electoral system in the Empire of Brazil
- Saraiva-Cotegipe Law, a Brazilian law
- Saraiva (Brazilian footballer) (born 1983), Brazilian professional football midfielder
