= Villanueva Saravia =

Uruguayan politician

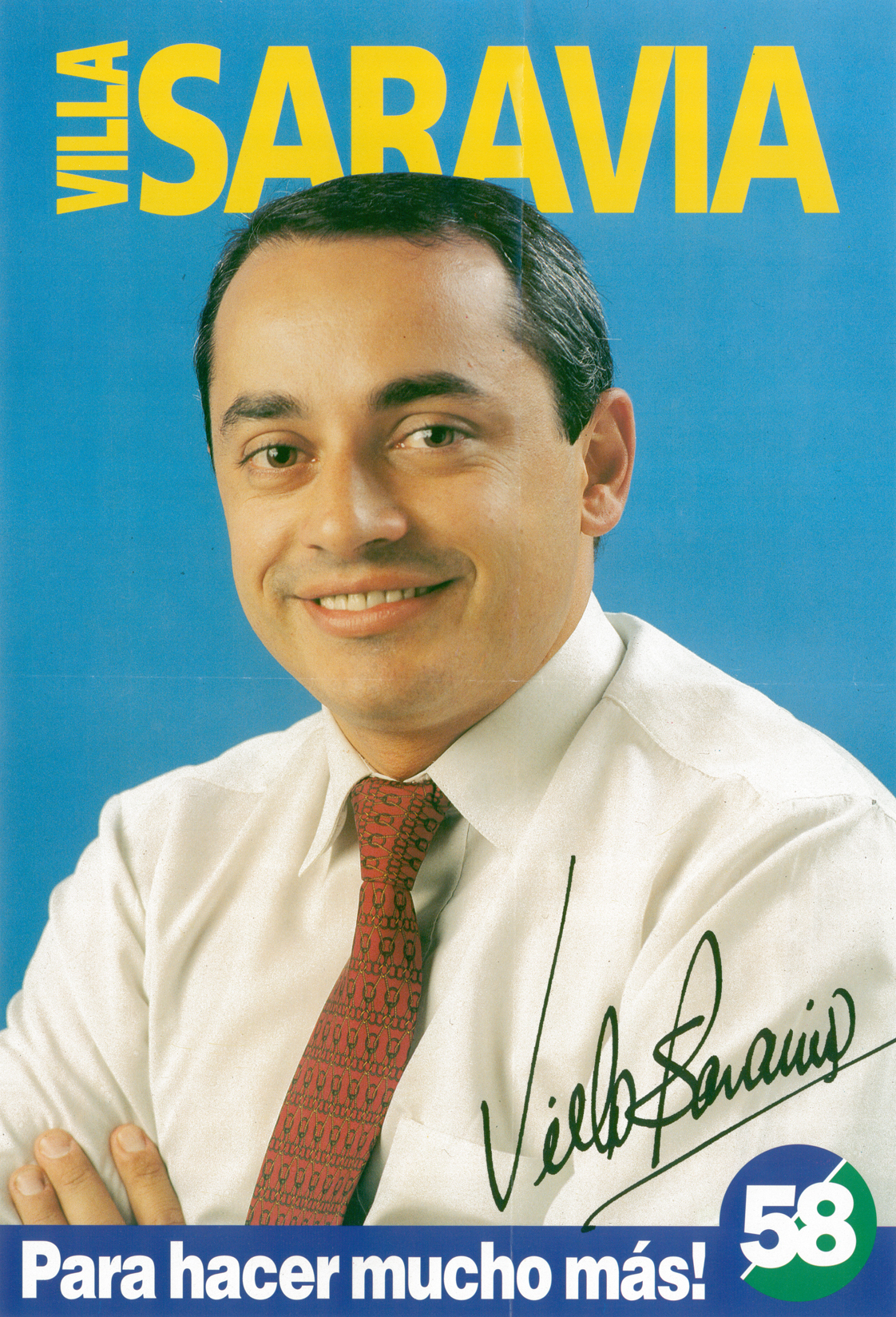

Intendant of Cerro Largo Department
- In office February 15, 1995 – August 12, 1998
- Preceded by: Rodolfo Nin Novoa
- Succeeded by: Serafín Bejérez

Personal details
- Born: Villanueva Saravia Pinto; September 16, 1964 Melo, Uruguay
- Died: August 12, 1998 (aged 33) Melo, Uruguay
- Party: National
- Spouses: Rosario Delgado (m. 1983; div. 1989); Verónica Bejérez (m. 1997)
- Children: 3, including Victoria Saravia
- Parents: Diego Saravia Saravia (father); Luz del Carmen Pinto Giordano (mother)
- Occupation: Politician

Villanueva Saravia Pinto (September 16, 1964 – August 12, 1998) was a Uruguayan politician of the National Party, who served as intendant of Cerro Largo Department from 1995 to 1998.

== Early life and education ==
Saravia was born on September 16, 1964, in Melo, the son of rancher Diego Saravia Saravia and the teacher Luz del Carmen Pinto Giordano. Coming from a political family, he was the great-great-grandson of Aparicio Saravia, a prominent caudillo of the National Party, who died following the Battle of Masoller in 1904, and who had a strong following in Cerro Largo.

After his parents divorced in 1967, he moved in with his maternal grandparents. When he was eleven years old, his mother committed suicide. He attended Primary School No. 3, Liceo No. 1 and the Liceo Militar in Minas.

== Political career ==
Saravia began his political militancy for the National Party in his adolescence. In 1983, while he was studying law, he worked for the then intendant of Montevideo Juan Carlos Payssé. In the 1989 general election, he ran for the Chamber of Representatives, being the candidate with the most votes in the department, although he was not elected due to the Ley de Lemas system. In 1990, at the age of 26, he was appointed vice president of the state-owned water utilities company Obras Sanitarias del Estado (OSE).

In 1992 he began a campaign in his hometown, and in 1994 at the age of 30 he was elected Intendant of Cerro Largo Department, being the youngest departmental head of government in the country. He took office on February 15, 1995, succeeding Rodolfo Nin Novoa. Saravia opposed the 1996 constitutional reform.

== Death ==
On August 12, 1998, Saravia was found dead in his home at the age of 33. Although the autopsy declared that the cause of death was suicide, different theories arose that maintained that it was a homicide, which were widely debated in the local media.

== Personal life ==
In 1983 at the age of 18, he married Rosario Delgado. They had a daughter, Victoria (b. 1986). In 1989 the couple divorced, and in 1993 Saravia had his daughter Lucía Belén, the result of a relationship with Sandra Malvares. In July 1996 he began a relationship with Verónica Bejérez, whom he married in May 1997. They had a daughter, María Cándida (b. 1998), who was born three days after his death.
