= Victoria Saravia =

Uruguayan model and television personality

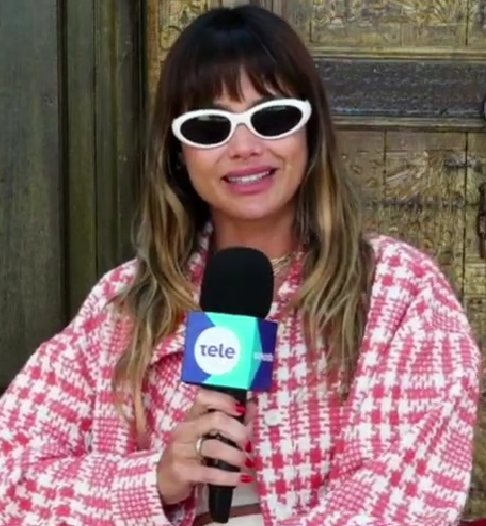
- Saravia in 2021
- Born: María Victoria Saravia Delgado; 21 April 1986 (age 40); Melo, Uruguay
- Occupations: Model; Actress; Media personality
- Partner: Manuel Desrets (2018–2019; 2021–present)
- Children: 1
- Parents: Villanueva Saravia (father); Rosario Delgado (mother)
- Family: Saravia family

María Victoria Saravia Delgado (born 20 April 1986) is a Uruguayan model, actress and media personality. Throughout her career she has worked for various brands and appeared in magazines such as Harper's Bazaar and Caras.

Saravia began her modeling career in her twenties, after being signed to Valentino Bookings. Later she began to participate in television programs and reality shows, which gave her greater public recognition. In 2016, she was signed to Wilhelmina Models' Aperture.

== Early life ==
María Victoria Saravia Delgado was born on 20 April 1986, in Melo, to Villanueva Saravia and Rosario Delgado. The eldest daughter, she has two half-sisters, Lucía Belén and María Cándida. Born into a prominent political family, her father, a politician who served as Intendant of Cerro Largo Department until his death in 1998, was the great-great-grandson of Aparicio Saravia, caudillo and leader of the National Party.

== Career ==
After graduating from high school, she moved to Montevideo to begin her university studies in dentistry. At the age of eighteen she was discovered by a model recruiter from the Valentino Bookings Agency and her modeling career began. In addition, she studied journalism at the Instituto Profesional de Enseñanza Periodística (IPEP).

Her television career began in 2012, when she replaced Cecilia Bonelli as co-host of the sports program Fútbol (Fox) para todos broadcast on Fox Sports Latin America. That year she had a recurring role in the Uruguayan Channel 10 sitcom Bienes Gananciales, starring Karina Vignola and Gaspar Valverde, in which she played the neighbor of the leading couple. In 2013, she joined the show business program Intratables as a panelist, broadcast on América TV's prime time. In August she left the show to join the morning program Desayuno Americano hosted by Pamela David on the same network.

In 2014, her media exposure increased when was announced as celebrity participant for Bailando 2014, the ninth season of Argentine dance competition Bailando por un Sueño. Together with her partner Gonzalo Gerber they were the first to be eliminated from the contest. Some time later, she declared that it was a "disastrous" experience and that she was eliminated for not wanting to fight with other participants in the entertainment scene.

In January 2015, Saravia launched her own clothing brand She's Da Boss based in Punta del Este. In 2016 she settled in New York to continue her modeling career, being signed to State Management and then Wilhelmina Models' Aperture. During 2017, she was part of the cast of the film El muerto cuenta su historia screened at the Brussels International Fantastic Film Festival, and launched Vintage Reformation, a sustainable fashion brand. Back in South America in 2020 she lived for a few months in Buenos Aires and then settled in Montevideo.

In 2021 she was a participant in the second season of MasterChef Celebrity Uruguay.

== Personal life ==
From 2007 to 2010, Saravia was in a relationship with footballer Carlos Bueno.

In September 2011, Caras magazine published images of Saravia and Uruguayan footballer Diego Forlán together in Milan. Weeks later they confirmed that they were dating. Their relationship attracted considerable media attention. In 2012 after rumors, it was confirmed that they had broken up.

From 2012 to 2013, Saravia was in a relationship with Argentine footballer Pablo Mouche through a mutual friend. In 2014 she was romantically related to businessman Lucas Vivo García Lagos, and in 2017 with American actor Chris Pine.

In 2018 she began dating the dj Manuel Desrets, but at the end of 2019 they separated. However, in 2021 they rekindled the relationship. On 19 May 2024, it was announced that Saravia was pregnant with the couple's first child. On September 24, 2024, they announced the birth of their son, Lío.

== Filmography ==
Year	Title	Role	Notes
2012	Fox para todos	Herself	Co-host
2012	Bienes gananciales	Vitto	Recurring role
2013	Intratables	Herself	Panelist
2013	Desayuno americano	Herself	Panelist
2014	Bailando 2014	Herself	Contestant; 1st. eliminated
2014	Camino al amor	Karina	Recurring role
2015	Viudas e hijos del Rock & Roll	Herself	Cameo; 1 episode
2021	MasterChef Celebrity Uruguay	Herself	Contestant; 10th eliminated
