= Higuaín =

Higuaín is a Basque surname. Notable people with the surname include:

- Jorge Higuaín, an Argentine central defender, father of Federico and Gonzalo Higuain
- Gonzalo Higuaín, former professional footballer who played as a striker, Jorge Higuain's son and Federico's younger brother
- Federico Higuaín, former professional footballer who played as a forward, Jorge Higuain's son and Gonzalo's older brother
