= Kapi =

Kapi, Kapı, or KAPI may refer to:

== Places ==
- Kapi, Estonia, a village in Estonia
- Kapı, Karataş, a village in Turkey
- a possible old volcanic eruption site near Krakatoa

== People ==
- Mari Kapi (1950–2009), Papua New Guinean judge
- Mustafa Kapı (born 2002), Turkish footballer

== Other uses ==
- Kapi (car), a Spanish car in the 1950s
- Kapi (mammal), a genus of prehistoric primates
- Kapi (raga), in Carnatic music
- KAPI, a radio station in Ruston, Louisiana owned by American Family Radio
- Shrimp paste, known as kapi in Laotian, Khmer, and Thai
- Kappa Alpha Pi (professional), or KAPI, a co-ed pre-law fraternity
- Kapı (film), a 2019 Turkish film about an Assyrian family

== See also ==
- Capi (disambiguation)
