= Capi =

Capi or CAPI may refer to:

== Computing ==
- Common Application Programmer's Interface, LispWorks Common Lisp GUI toolkit
- Common ISDN Application Programming Interface, Common ISDN API
- Computer-assisted personal interviewing, a surveying technique that uses a computer based questionnaire
- Microsoft Cryptographic Application Programming Interface, an interface to a library of functions software developers can call upon for security and cryptography services
- Coherent Accelerator Processor Interface, a bus technology introduced in IBM's POWER8.

== People ==
- Capi (footballer, born 1977), Jesús Capitán Prado, Spanish football midfielder
- Capi (footballer, born 1979), Jesús Tablado Feito, Spanish football forward
- Capi (footballer, born 1981), Manuel Borja Calvar Simón, Spanish football defender
- Capi (footballer, born 2006), Hugo Martínez González, Spanish football midfielder

== Other uses ==
- Cash Assistance Program for Immigrants, a service for immigrants in the US not eligible for Supplemental Security Income (SSI)
- Capi, daily newspaper from Nagaland, India

== See also ==
- Cappi
- Kapi (disambiguation)
