= 2007–08 Real Madrid CF season =

107th season in existence of Real Madrid CF

Real Madrid
2007–08 season
- President: Ramón Calderón
- Head coach: Bernd Schuster
- Stadium: Santiago Bernabéu
- La Liga: 1st
- Copa del Rey: Round of 16
- Supercopa de España: Runners-up
- UEFA Champions League: Round of 16
- Top goalscorer: League: Raúl (18); All: Raúl (23)
- Highest home attendance: 80,300 vs Atlético Madrid (25 August 2007)
- Lowest home attendance: 69,600 vs Getafe (24 February 2008)
- Biggest win: Real Madrid 5–0 Villarreal
- Biggest defeat: Real Madrid 3–5 Sevilla
Home colours	Away colours	Third colours

The 2007–08 season was Real Madrid Club de Fútbol's 77th season in La Liga. This article lists all matches that the club played in the 2007–08 season, and also shows statistics of the club's players. Bwin.com became the new kit sponsor.

== Players ==
=== Squad information ===
N	Pos.	Nat.	Name	Age	EU	Since	App	Goals	Ends	Transfer fee	Notes
1	GK	(Spain)	Iker Casillas (VC)	26	EU	1999	425	0	2017	Youth system	
13	GK	(Spain)	Jordi Codina	26	EU	2007	1	0	2010	Youth system	
25	GK	(Poland)	Jerzy Dudek	35	EU	2007	10	0	2009	Free	
5	DF	(Italy)	Fabio Cannavaro	34	EU	2006	78	2	2009	€10M	
16	DF	(Argentina)	Gabriel Heinze	29	EU	2007	28	1	2011	€12M	Second nationality: Italy
12	DF	(Brazil)	Marcelo	20	Non-EU	2007 (Winter)	39	0	2012	€6.5M	Second nationality: Spain
21	DF	(Germany)	Christoph Metzelder	27	EU	2007	16	0	2010	Free	
3	DF	(Portugal)	Pepe	25	EU	2007	34	0	2012	€30M	Second nationality: Brazil
4	DF	(Spain)	Sergio Ramos	22	EU	2005	151	18	2013	€27M	
2	DF	(Spain)	Míchel Salgado (VC)	32	EU	1999	251	4	2009	€11M	
22	DF	(Spain)	Miguel Torres	22	EU	2007	51	0	2012	Youth system	
6	MF	(Mali)	Mahamadou Diarra	27	EU	2006	78	4	2011	€26M	
8	MF	(Argentina)	Fernando Gago	22	EU	2007 (Winter)	59	0	2012	€20M	Second nationality: Italy
24	MF	(Equatorial Guinea)	Javier Balboa	23	EU	2005	22	4	2011	Youth system	Second nationality: Spain
19	MF	(Brazil)	Júlio Baptista	26	EU	2005	69	13	2010	€20M	Second nationality: Spain
15	MF	(Netherlands)	Royston Drenthe	21	EU	2007	26	4	2012	€13M	Second nationality: Suriname
14	MF	(Spain)	Guti (VC)	31	EU	1996	468	73	2010	Youth system	
23	MF	(Netherlands)	Wesley Sneijder	23	EU	2007	39	9	2012	€27M	
11	FW	(Netherlands)	Arjen Robben	24	EU	2007	28	5	2009	€36M	
20	FW	(Argentina)	Gonzalo Higuaín	20	EU	2007 (Winter)	53	12	2012	€13M	Second nationality: France
7	FW	(Spain)	Raúl (captain)	30	EU	1994	655	292	2011	Youth system	
10	FW	(Brazil)	Robinho	24	Non-EU	2004	135	30	2010	€24M	Second nationality: Spain
18	FW	(Argentina)	Javier Saviola	26	EU	2007	25	5	2011	Free	Second nationality: Spain
9	FW	(Spain)	Roberto Soldado	22	EU	2005	27	4	2012	Youth system	
17	FW	(Netherlands)	Ruud van Nistelrooy	31	EU	2006	79	53	2010	€15M	

- Last updated: 18 May 2008
- Source: Realmadrid, Players transfer, Wikipedia players' articles,

Official shirt numbers, ESPN (for appearances and goals) and soccer-spain.com (for EU passport)

- Ordered by position on pitch.

== Transfers ==
=== In ===
No.	Pos.	Nat.	Name	Age	EU	Moving from	Type	Transfer window	Ends	Transfer fee	Source
13	GK	(Spain)	Codina	25	EU	Youth system	Promoted ✓	Summer	2010	Youth system	Realmadrid
22	DF	(Spain)	Torres	21	EU	Youth system	Promoted ✓	Summer	2012	Youth system	Realmadrid
	DF	(Spain)	Agus	22	EU	Youth system	Promoted ✓	Summer	2010	Youth system	Realmadrid
	MF	(Spain)	Granero	20	EU	Youth system	Promoted ✓	Summer	2011	Youth system	Realmadrid
	MF	(Spain)	De la Red	22	EU	Youth system	Promoted ✓	Summer	2011	Youth system	Realmadrid
	MF	(Spain)	Adrián	19	EU	Youth system	Promoted ✓	Summer	2011	Youth system	Realmadrid
9	FW	(Spain)	Soldado	22	EU	Osasuna	Loan return ✓	Summer	2012	N/A	Realmadrid
19	MF	(Brazil)	Baptista	25	EU	Arsenal (England)	Loan return ✓	Summer	2010	N/A	Realmadrid
24	MF	(Equatorial Guinea)	Balboa	22	EU	Racing Santander	Loan return ✓	Summer	2012	N/A	Realmadrid
11	MF	(Netherlands)	Robben	23	EU	Chelsea (England)	Signed ✓	Summer	2012	€36M	Realmadrid
3	DF	(Portugal)	Pepe	24	EU	Porto (Portugal)	Signed ✓	Summer	2012	€30M	Realmadrid
23	MF	(Netherlands)	Sneijder	23	EU	Ajax (Netherlands)	Signed ✓	Summer	2012	€27M	Realmadrid
15	DF	(Netherlands)	Drenthe	20	EU	Feyenoord (Netherlands)	Signed ✓	Summer	2012	€14M	Realmadrid
16	DF	(Argentina)	Heinze	29	EU	Manchester United (England)	Signed ✓	Summer	2011	€12M	Realmadrid
18	FW	(Argentina)	Saviola	25	EU	Barcelona	Signed ✓	Summer	2011	Free	Realmadrid
21	DF	(Germany)	Metzelder	26	EU	Borussia Dortmund (Germany)	Signed ✓	Summer	2010	Free	Realmadrid
25	GK	(Poland)	Dudek	34	EU	Liverpool (England)	Signed ✓	Summer	2009	Free	Realmadrid
29	MF	(Spain)	Adrián	19	EU	Celta de Vigo	Loan return ✓	Winter	2011	N/A	Realmadrid

Total spending: ▼€119 million

=== Out ===
No.	Pos.	Nat.	Name	Age	EU	Moving to	Type	Transfer window	Transfer fee	Source
3	DF	(Brazil)	Roberto Carlos	34	EU	Fenerbahçe (Turkey)	Contract ended ✓	Summer	Free	fifa.com
21	DF	(Spain)	Helguera	32	EU	Valencia	Contract ended ✓	Summer	Free	Realmadrid
22	DF	(Spain)	Pavón	27	EU	Zaragoza	Contract ended ✓	Summer	Free	Real Zaragoza
23	MF	(England)	Beckham	32	EU	LA Galaxy (United States)	Contract ended ✓	Summer	Free	Realmadrid
24	DF	(Spain)	Mejía	25	EU	Murcia	Contract ended ✓	Summer	Free	Realmadrid
25	DF	(Spain)	Miñambres	26	EU		Retired	Summer	Free	
11	DF	(Brazil)	Cicinho	27	EU	Roma (Italy)	Transferred ✓	Summer	€9M	Realmadrid
18	DF	(England)	Woodgate	27	EU	Middlesbrough (England)	Transferred ✓	Summer	£7M	Realmadrid
13	GK	(Spain)	López	25	EU	Villarreal	Transferred ✓	Summer	€7M	Realmadrid
8	MF	(Brazil)	Emerson	31	EU	Milan (Italy)	Transferred ✓	Summer	€5M	Realmadrid
	MF	(Uruguay)	Diogo	24	EU	Zaragoza	Transferred ✓	Summer	€4.5M	Real Zaragoza
26	MF	(Spain)	De la Red	22	EU	Getafe	Transferred ✓	Summer	loan	Realmadrid
15	DF	(Spain)	Bravo	26	EU	Olympiacos (Greece)	Transferred ✓	Summer	€2.3M	Realmadrid
	DM	(Spain)	Javi García	20	EU	Osasuna	Transferred ✓	Summer	Undisclosed	Realmadrid
	FW	(Spain)	Rayco	20	EU	Villarreal	Transferred ✓	Summer	Undisclosed	Realmadrid
	RB	(Spain)	Miguel Palencia	23	EU		Transferred ✓	Summer	Undisclosed	Realmadrid
19	MF	(Spain)	Reyes	23	EU	Arsenal (England)	Loan ended ✓	Summer	—	fifa.com
18	FW	(Italy)	Cassano	25	EU	Sampdoria (Italy)	Loaned out ✓	Summer	—	Realmadrid
	MF	(Uruguay)	García	30	EU	Murcia	Loaned out ✓	Summer	—	Realmadrid
29	MF	(Spain)	Adrián	19	EU	Celta de Vigo	Loaned out ✓	Summer	—	Realmadrid
	DF	(Spain)	Agus	22	EU	Celta de Vigo	Loaned out ✓	Summer	—	Realmadrid
18	MF	(Spain)	Granero	20	EU	Getafe	Loaned out ✓	Summer	—	Realmadrid
29	MF	(Spain)	Adrián	19	EU	Gimnàstic	Loaned out ✓	Winter	—	Gimnàstic de Tarragona

Total income: ▲€37.8 million

Last updated: 2008-01-31
EU = if holds or not a European Union passport; Country: when 2 flags, 1st flag = country that plays for internationally, 2nd flag = country of birth; N = number on jersey; P = Position (for position name, pause mouse pointer on abbreviation); Name = Name on jersey (for more extensive name, pause mouse pointer on name); Age = age on the day of the signing; Moving from = only indicate the club the player was playing before start playing for this club in this season, for the type of the moving see Status column; Moving to = only indicates the club the player is going to play next, for the type of the moving see Status column; Ends = when the player's current contract ends; n/a = Not applicable.

== Club ==
=== Technical staff ===
Position	Staff
Head coach	(Germany) Bernd Schuster
Second coach	(Spain) Manuel Ruiz
Physical trainer	(Italy) Valter di Salvo
Fitness coach	(Spain) Jordi García
Goalkeepers coach	(Spain) Pedro Luis Jaro

Last updated: 9 November 2007
Source: Realmadrid.com, El club más laureado del mundo and realmadridfans

=== Kits ===
Supplier: Adidas
Sponsor(s): bwin

Home	Home alt. †	Away	Third Kit

Source: "Real Madrid's current kit". Realmadridfans.org. Archived from the original on 11 August 2007.

† Only used against Alicante CF during Copa del Rey round of 32 first leg.

=== Other information ===
President	(Spain) Ramón Calderón
Honorary Life President	(Argentina) (Spain) Alfredo Di Stéfano
Vice-president	(Spain) José Ignacio Rivero
Vice-president	(Spain) Vicente Boluda
Vice-president	(Spain) Amador Suárez
Secretary of the Board	(Spain) Manuel Serrano
Director of football	(Montenegro) Predrag Mijatović
Technical Secretary	(Spain) Miguel Ángel Portugal
Ground (capacity and dimensions)	Santiago Bernabéu (80.400 / 107x72m)
Budget	€353M

Updated to match played 24 Sep 2007
Source: Board of Directors (Realmadrid), El club más laureado del mundo, Santiago Bernabéu Stadium and Real Madrid closes the best year in its history

== Competitions ==
=== La Liga ===
==== League table ====
Pos	Team	Pld	W	D	L	GF	GA	GD	Pts	Qualification or relegation
1	Real Madrid (C)	38	27	4	7	84	36	+48	85	Qualification for the Champions League group stage
2	Villarreal	38	24	5	9	63	40	+23	77	Qualification for the Champions League group stage
3	Barcelona	38	19	10	9	76	43	+33	67	Qualification for the Champions League third qualifying round
4	Atlético Madrid	38	19	7	12	66	47	+19	64 (Note: ATM 4–3 SEV; SEV 1–2 ATM)	Qualification for the Champions League third qualifying round
5	Sevilla	38	20	4	14	75	49	+26	64	Qualification for the UEFA Cup first round

Source: LFP
Rules for classification: 1st points; 2nd head-to-head points; 3rd head-to-head goal difference; 4th head-to-head goals scored; 5th goal difference; 6th number of goals scored; 7th Fair-play points
(C) Champions

==== Results by round ====
Round	1	2	3	4	5	6	7	8	9	10	11	12	13	14	15	16	17	18	19	20	21	22	23	24	25	26	27	28	29	30	31	32	33	34	35	36	37	38
Ground	H	A	H	A	H	A	H	A	H	A	A	H	A	H	A	H	A	H	A	A	H	A	H	A	H	A	H	A	H	H	A	H	A	H	A	H	A	H
Result	W	W	W	D	W	W	W	L	W	W	L	W	D	W	W	W	W	W	W	W	W	L	W	L	L	W	W	L	L	W	D	W	W	W	W	W	D	W
Position	5	1	1	1	1	1	1	1	1	1	1	1	1	1	1	1	1	1	1	1	1	1	1	1	1	1	1	1	1	1	1	1	1	1	1	1	1	1

Updated to match(es) played on 18 May 2008. Source: Competitive Matches
A = Away; H = Home; W = Win; D = Draw; L = Loss

==== Matches ====
25 August 2007 1	Real Madrid	2–1	Atlético Madrid	Madrid
19:00 CET	14', (yellow card) 90' Raúl; (yellow card) 35' Pepe; (yellow card) 48' Guti; 81' Sneijder	Report	1' Agüero; (yellow card) 6' Perea; (yellow card) 68' García	Stadium: Estadio Santiago Bernabéu; Attendance: 80,300; Referee: Mejuto González

2 September 2007 2	Villarreal	0–5	Real Madrid	Villarreal
21:00 CET	(yellow card) 11' Rossi; (yellow card) 75' Fuentes	Report	39' Raúl; 47', 73' Sneijder; 50' Van Nistelrooy; (yellow card) 50' Ramos; 80' Guti	Stadium: Estadio de la Ceramica; Attendance: 22,080; Referee: Medina Cantalejo

15 September 2007 3	Real Madrid	3–1	Almería	Madrid
20:00 CET	(yellow card) 30' Guti; 35' Saviola; (yellow card) 62'Ramos; 69' Sneijder; 88' Higuaín; (yellow card) 89' Gago	Report	(red card) 63' Crusat; (yellow card) 68' Soriano; 73' Uche	Stadium: Estadio Santiago Bernabéu; Attendance: 75,200; Referee: Álvarez Izquierdo

23 September 2007 4	Valladolid	1–1	Real Madrid	Valladolid
21:00 CET	(yellow card) 41' Butelle; (yellow card) 60' Borja; 71' López	Report	(yellow card) 18' Salgado; 87' Saviola	Stadium: Estadio José Zorrilla; Attendance: 26,500; Referee: Iturralde González

27 September 2007 5	Real Madrid	2–0	Real Betis	Madrid
22:00 CET	66' (pen.) Raúl; (yellow card) 72' Cannavaro; 85' Baptista	Report	(yellow card) 86' Melli	Stadium: Estadio Santiago Bernabéu; Attendance: 70,400; Referee: Pérez Lasa

30 September 2007 6	Getafe	0–1	Real Madrid	Getafe
19:00 CET	(yellow card) 82' Kepa; (yellow card) 90' Belenguer	Report	(yellow card) 45' Gago; (yellow card) 52' Sneijder; 65' Ramos; (yellow card) 89' Robben	Stadium: Coliseum Alfonso Perez; Attendance: 16,150; Referee: Undiano Mallenco

7 October 2007 7	Real Madrid	2–0	Recreativo de Huelva	Madrid
19:00 CET	(yellow card) 16' Sneijder; 72' Van Nistelrooy; 90+2' Higuaín	Report	(yellow card) 18' Beto; (yellow card) 26' Cáceres; (yellow card) 29' Vázquez; (yellow card) 50' Calvo; (yellow card) 77' Bautista; (yellow card) 80' Gerard; (yellow card) 87' Sinama Pongolle	Stadium: Estadio Santiago Bernabéu; Attendance: 76,000; Referee: Daudén Ibáñez

20 October 2007 8	Espanyol	2–1	Real Madrid	Cornellá de Llobregat
22:00 CET	2' Riera; (yellow card) 39' Zabaleta; 52' Tamudo; (yellow card) 90+4' Jonathan	Report	(yellow card) 31' Van Nistelrooy; (yellow card) 85' Guti; (yellow card) 86', (goal) 90' Ramos	Stadium: RCDE; Attendance: 50,400; Referee: Teixeira Vitienes

28 October 2007 9	Real Madrid	3–1	Deportivo La Coruña	Madrid
18:00 CET	6' (pen.) Van Nistelrooy; (yellow card) 47' Salgado; (yellow card) 53' Guti; (yellow card) 76' Gago; 78' Raúl; (yellow card) 83' Sneijder; 83' Robinho	Report	2' Xisco; (yellow card) 22' J. Rodríguez; (yellow card) 28' De Guzmán; (yellow card) 72' (yellow-red card) 80' Sergio; (yellow card) 75' Riki	Stadium: Estadio Santiago Bernabéu; Attendance: 69,600; Referee: Clos Gómez

31 October 2007 10	Valencia	1–5	Real Madrid	Valencia
22:00 CET	(yellow card) 56' Albelda; 58' Angulo; (red card) 83' Albiol	Report	1' Raúl; 24', 36' Van Nistelrooy; 29' Ramos; (yellow card) 41' Marcelo; 67' Robinho	Stadium: Estadio Mestalla; Attendance: 49,500; Referee: Pérez Burrull

3 November 2007 11	Sevilla	2–0	Real Madrid	Sevilla
22:00 CET	20', (yellow card) 40' Keita; 21' Luís Fabiano; (yellow card) 30' Alves; (yellow card) 54' Dragutinović; (yellow card) 62' Capel	Report	(yellow card) 40' (yellow-red card) 51' Ramos; (yellow card) 47' Robinho; (yellow card) 51' Casillas; (yellow card) 58' Raúl; (yellow card) 78' Diarra; (yellow card) 85' Guti	Stadium: Estadio Sanchez Pizjuan; Attendance: 43,225; Referee: Alvarez Izquierdo

11 November 2007 12	Real Madrid	4–3	Mallorca	Madrid
20:00 CET	11', 16' Robinho; 60' Raúl; 73' Van Nistelrooy; (yellow card) 89' Diarra; (yellow card) 90' Higuaín	Report	12', 35', (yellow card) 31' Varela; 59' Güiza	Stadium: Estadio Santiago Bernabéu; Attendance: 77,600; Referee: Fernández

24 November 2007 13	Real Murcia	1–1	Real Madrid	Murcia
22:00 CET	(yellow card) 30', (goal) 49' De Lucas; (yellow card) 33' Baiano; (yellow card) 52' Movilla; (yellow card) 85' Arzo; (yellow card) 86' Abel; (yellow card) 90' Alonso	Report	9' Robinho; (yellow card) 32' Gago; (yellow card) 83' Pepe; (red card) 84' Guti	Stadium: Nueva Condomina; Attendance: 31,100; Referee: Daudén Ibáñez

1 December 2007 14	Real Madrid	3–1	Racing Santander	Madrid
20:00 CET	4', 69' Raúl; 10' (o.g.) Sánchez; (yellow card) 17' Ramos; (yellow card) 45' Marcelo	Report	(yellow card) 43' Serrano; 73', (yellow card) 85' Munitis; (yellow card) 80' Lozano	Stadium: Estadio Santiago Bernabéu; Attendance: 68,000; Referee: Muñiz Fernández

8 December 2007 15	Athletic Bilbao	0–1	Real Madrid	Bilbao
22:00 CET	(yellow card) 57' Orbaiz; (yellow card) 58' Amorebieta; (yellow card) 75' Yeste	Report	(yellow card) 44' Sneijder; 54' Van Nistelrooy; (yellow card) 71' Robinho	Stadium: San Mames; Attendance: 40,000; Referee: Medina Cantalejo

16 December 2007 16	Real Madrid	2–0	Osasuna	Madrid
21:00 CET	16' (yellow card) 43' Van Nistelrooy; 76' Sneijder; (yellow card) 76' Marcelo	Report		Stadium: Estadio Santiago Bernabéu; Attendance: 70,400; Referee: Teixeira Vitienes

23 December 2007 17	Barcelona	0–1	Real Madrid	Barcelona
19:00 CET	(yellow card) 27' Puyol; (yellow card) 68' Milito	Report	36', (yellow card) 87' Baptista; (yellow card) 45+2' Ramos	Stadium: Camp Nou; Attendance: 98,700; Referee: Mejuto González

6 January 2008 18	Real Madrid	2–0	Zaragoza	Madrid
19:00 CET	68' Van Nistelrooy; (yellow card) 70' Ramos; 76' Robinho	Report	(yellow card) 70' Ayala; (yellow card) 86' Diogo	Stadium: Estadio Santiago Bernabéu; Attendance: 72,800; Referee: Iturralde González

13 January 2008 19	Levante	0–2	Real Madrid	Levante
19:00 CET	(yellow card) 31' Tommassi	Report	76' (pen.), 88' Van Nistelrooy	Stadium: Estadio Ciudad de Valencia; Attendance: 21,505; Referee: Fernández Borbalán

20 January 2008 20	Atlético Madrid	0–2	Real Madrid	Madrid
19:00 CET	(yellow card) 4' López; (yellow card) 34' Ibáñez; (yellow card) 62' Motta; (yellow card) 68' Perea; (yellow card) 71' Rodríguez	Report	1' Raúl; (yellow card) 20' Torres; 40' Van Nistelrooy; (yellow card) 63' Ramos; (yellow card) 73' Guti; (yellow card) 78' Salgado	Stadium: Estadio Vicente Calderón; Attendance: 54,800; Referee: Muñiz Fernández

27 January 2008 21	Real Madrid	3–2	Villarreal	Madrid
21:00 CET	9', 53' Robinho; (yellow card) 65' Gago; 77' Sneijder	Report	16' Rossi; 76' Capdevila; (yellow card) 80' Godín; (yellow card) 90+4' Senna	Stadium: Estadio Santiago Bernabéu; Attendance: 79,200; Referee: Álvarez Izquierdo

2 February 2008 22	Almería	2–0	Real Madrid	Almería
20:00 CET	15' Juanito; (yellow card) 24' Melo; (yellow card) 25' Alves; 47' (pen.) Negredo; (yellow card) 87' Soriano	Report	(yellow card) 27' Casillas; (yellow card) 44' Sneijder; (yellow card) 69' Ramos; (yellow card) 57' Guti	Stadium: Estadio de los Juegos Mediterráneos; Attendance: 20,900; Referee: Clos Gómez

10 February 2008 23	Real Madrid	7–0	Valladolid	Madrid
19:00 CET	9' Baptista; (yellow card) 23' Ramos; 31', 39' (pen.) Raúl; 33' Robben; 44', 62' Guti; 80' Drenthe	Report	(yellow card) 38' Asenjo	Stadium: Estadio Santiago Bernabéu; Attendance: 78,400; Referee: Ramírez Domínguez

16 February 2008 24	Real Betis	2–1	Real Madrid	Sevilla
20:00 CET	32' Edu; 35' González; (yellow card) 54' Arzu; (yellow card) 90+3' Melli; (yellow card) 90+4' Rivera	Report	5' Drenthe; (yellow card) 37' Gago; (yellow card) 40' Marcelo; (yellow card) 63' Baptista; (yellow card) 66' Robben; (yellow card) 74' Ramos	Stadium: Estadio Benito Villamarin; Attendance: 47,850; Referee: Undiano Mallenco

24 February 2008 25	Real Madrid	0–1	Getafe	Madrid
21:00 CET	(yellow card) 42' Cannavaro; (yellow card) 65' Heinze; (yellow card) 90' Higuaín	Report	(yellow card) 20' Celestini; (yellow card) 21' Casquero; (yellow card) 27' Belenguer; 65' Uche	Stadium: Estadio Santiago Bernabéu; Attendance: 69,600; Referee: Daudén Ibáñez

1 March 2008 26	Recreativo de Huelva	2–3	Real Madrid	Huelva
20:00 CET	16', (yellow card) 80' Cáceres; (yellow card) 18' Bouzón; (red card) 51' Beto; (red card) 69' Álvarez; (yellow card) 87' Sinama Pongolle; 90+4' Martins	Report	28' Raúl; (yellow card) 50' (yellow-red card) 55' Ramos; (yellow card) 70' Robben; (yellow card) 72' Cannavaro; 73', 90' Robinho	Stadium: Estadio Nuevo Colombino; Attendance: 20,600; Referee: Iturralde González

8 March 2008 27	Real Madrid	2–1	Espanyol	Madrid
20:00 CET	43' Higuaín; (yellow card) 46' Drenthe; 72' (pen.) Raúl	Report	(yellow card) 13' Zabaleta; (yellow card) 18' Moisés; 29' Valdo; (yellow card) 70' Jarque; (yellow card) 70' D. García; (yellow card) 90' Smiljanić; (yellow card) 92' (yellow-red card) 93' Tamudo; (red card) 93' Kameni	Stadium: Estadio Santiago Bernabéu; Attendance: 72,000; Referee: Muñiz Fernández

15 March 2008 28	Deportivo La Coruña	1–0	Real Madrid	A Coruña
20:00 CET	57' (o.g.) Pepe; (yellow card) 60' De Guzmán; (yellow card) 68' Coloccini; (yellow card) 89' Aouate	Report	(yellow card) 72' Torres	Stadium: Estadio Riazor; Attendance: 31,140; Referee: Turienzo Álvarez

23 March 2008 29	Real Madrid	2–3	Valencia	Madrid
	35', 56' Raúl; (yellow card) 84' Pepe; (yellow card) 84' Cannavaro; (yellow card) 90+2' Marcelo		(yellow card) 24' Marchena; 34', 67' (pen.) Villa; 89' Arizmendi	Stadium: Estadio Santiago Bernabéu; Attendance: 76,000; Referee: Clos Gómez

30 March 2008 30	Real Madrid	3–1	Sevilla	Madrid
21:00 CET	7', (yellow card) 22' Heinze; 39', (yellow card) 57' Raúl; (yellow card) 60' Guti; 65' Higuaín; (yellow card) 80' Diarra	Report	(yellow card) 6' Crespo; 38' Kanouté; (yellow card) 45' Prieto; (yellow card) 50' Mosquera	Stadium: Estadio Santiago Bernabéu; Attendance: 76,000; Referee: Teixeira Vitienes

5 April 2008 31	Mallorca	1–1	Real Madrid	Palma
22:00 CET	(yellow card) 40' F. Navarro; (yellow card) 45+3' Varela; 72', (yellow card) 90' Valero	Report	43' Sneijder; (yellow card) 46' (yellow-red card) 66' Ramos; (yellow card) 75' Heinze; (yellow card) 85' Casillas	Stadium: Estadio Son Moix; Attendance: 19,635; Referee: Daudén Ibáñez

13 April 2008 32	Real Madrid	1–0	Real Murcia	Madrid
19:00 CET	(yellow card) 17' Pepe; (red card) 20' Torres; (yellow card) 29' Guti; 59' Sneijder; (yellow card) 76' Salgado; (yellow card) 87' Robben	Report	(yellow card) 36' Goitom; (yellow card) 42' Arzo	Stadium: Estadio Santiago Bernabéu; Attendance: 76,000; Referee: Iturralde González

20 April 2008 33	Racing Santander	0–2	Real Madrid	Santander
19:00 CET	(yellow card) 17' Serrano; (yellow card) 34' Moratón; (yellow card) 49' Tchité; (yellow card) 52' Pinillos	Report	13' Raúl; (yellow card) 80' Cannavaro; 93' Higuaín	Stadium: Estadio El Sardinero; Attendance: 22,200; Referee: Muñiz Fernández

27 April 2008 34	Real Madrid	3–0	Athletic Bilbao	Madrid
21:00 CET	14' Saviola; (yellow card) 32' Ramos; (yellow card) 36' Heinze; 74' Robben; 77' Higuaín	Report	(yellow card) 38' Garmendia; (yellow card) 54' Martínez	Stadium: Estadio Santiago Bernabéu; Attendance: 76,000; Referee: Fernández Borbalán

4 May 2008 35	Osasuna	1–2	Real Madrid	Pamplona
21:00 CET	(yellow card) 15' Azpilicueta; (yellow card) 38' Cruchaga; (yellow card) 56' Flaño; (yellow card) 75', (goal) 84' (pen.) Puñal	Report	(yellow card) 12' (yellow-red card) 46' Cannavaro; (yellow card) 38' Heinze; (yellow card) 52' Sneijder; (yellow card) 54' Diarra; (yellow card) 67' Torres; 87' Robben; 89' Higuaín	Stadium: Estadio El Sadar; Attendance: 19,800; Referee: Medina Cantalejo

7 May 2008 36	Real Madrid	4–1	Barcelona	Madrid
22:00 CET	13' Raúl; 21' Robben; (yellow card) 41' Sneijder; 64' Higuaín; 77' (pen.) Van Nistelrooy; (yellow card) 84' Heinze; (yellow card) 90+1' Pepe	Report	(yellow card) 20' Touré; (yellow card) 39' Márquez; (yellow card) 50' Henry; (yellow card) 58' Valdés; (yellow card) 76' (yellow-red card) 90+2' Xavi; (yellow card) 76' Edmílson; 87' Henry	Stadium: Estadio Santiago Bernabéu; Attendance: 80,000; Referee: Pérez Burrull

11 May 2008 37	Zaragoza	2–2	Real Madrid	Zaragoza
21:00 CET	19' Oliveira; (yellow card) 68' Paredes; (yellow card) 74' Celades; (yellow card) 83', (goal) 87' Sergio	Report	(yellow card) 17' Marcelo; (yellow card) 19' Higuaín; 26' Van Nistelrooy; (yellow card) 36', (goal) 77' Robinho; (yellow card) 55' Sneijder; (yellow card) 71' Metzelder	Stadium: La Romareda; Attendance: 34,155; Referee: Pérez Lasa

18 May 2008 38	Real Madrid	5–2	Levante	Madrid
21:00 CET	23', 41' Van Nistelrooy; 28', 78' Ramos; (yellow card) 40' Marcelo; 55' Sneijder	Report	(yellow card) 27' Serrano; (yellow card) 51' Juanma; 53', 65' Geijo; (yellow card) 77' Rubiales	Stadium: Estadio Santiago Bernabéu; Attendance: 72,000; Referee: Turienzo Álvarez

=== Champions League ===
==== Group C ====
Pos	Team	Pld	W	D	L	GF	GA	GD	Pts	Qualification
1	(Spain) Real Madrid	6	3	2	1	13	9	+4	11	Advance to knockout stage
2	(Greece) Olympiacos	6	3	2	1	11	7	+4	11	Advance to knockout stage
3	(Germany) Werder Bremen	6	2	0	4	8	13	−5	6	Transfer to UEFA Cup
4	(Italy) Lazio	6	1	2	3	8	11	−3	5	

Source: RSSSF

18 September 2007 1	Real Madrid (Spain)	2–1	(Germany) Werder Bremen	Madrid
20:45 CET	16' Raúl; 74', (yellow card) 88' Van Nistelrooy	Report	17' Sanogo; (yellow card) 72' Vranješ; (yellow card) 90+2' Diego	Stadium: Estadio Santiago Bernabéu; Attendance: 64,800; Referee: Howard Webb (England)

3 October 2007 2	Lazio (Italy)	2–2	(Spain) Real Madrid	Rome
20:45 CET	32', 75' Pandev	Report	8', 61' Van Nistelrooy; (yellow card) 62' Heinze	Stadium: Stadio Olimpico; Attendance: 70,465; Referee: De Bleeckere (Belgium)

24 October 2007 3	Real Madrid (Spain)	4–2	(Greece) Olympiacos	Madrid
20:45 CET	2' Raúl; (yellow card) 29' Salgado; (yellow card) 64', (goal) 68', 82' Robinho; 90' Balboa	Report	7' Galleti; (red card) 12' Torosidis; 46' Júlio César; (yellow card) 52' Đorđević; (yellow card) 69' Patsatzoglou; (yellow card) 75' Galleti; (yellow card) 90' Antzas	Stadium: Estadio Santiago Bernabéu; Attendance: 73,600; Referee: Henning (Norway)

6 November 2007 4	Olympiacos (Greece)	0–0	(Spain) Real Madrid	Karaiskakis Stadium
20:45 CET	(yellow card) 44' Đorđević; (yellow card) 49' Stoltidis; (yellow card) 71' Pantos	Report	(yellow card) 10' Casillas; (yellow card) 15' Ramos	Attendance: 30,820; Referee: Micheľ (Slovakia)

28 November 2007 5	Werder Bremen (Germany)	3–2	(Spain) Real Madrid	Weserstadion
20:45 CET	5' Rosenberg; (yellow card) 10' Hunt; 40' Sanogo; 58' Hunt	Report	14' Robinho; (yellow card) 61' Pepe; 71' Van Nistelrooy; (yellow card) 80' Ramos; (yellow card) 88' Diarra	Attendance: 34,010; Referee: Pieter Vink (Netherlands)

11 December 2007 6	Real Madrid (Spain)	3–1	(Italy) Lazio	Estadio Santiago Bernabéu
20:45 CET	13' Baptista; 15' Raúl; 36' Robinho	Report	80' Pandev	Attendance: 76,000; Referee: Busacca (Switzerland)

==== Round of 16 ====
19 February 2008 1	Roma (Italy)	2–1	(Spain) Real Madrid	Rome
21:45 CET	24' Pizarro; (yellow card) 42' De Rossi; 58' Mancini; (yellow card) 68' Perrotta; (yellow card) 90+1' Cassetti	Report	8' Raúl; (yellow card) 23' Diarra; (yellow card) 64' Torres; (yellow card) 69' Ramos	Stadium: Stadio Olimpico; Attendance: 82,900; Referee: Fandel (Germany)

5 March 2008 2	Real Madrid (Spain)	1–2	(Italy) Roma	Madrid
21:45 CET	Heinze (yellow card) 15'; Pepe (yellow card) 41' (yellow-red card) 71'; Raúl 75'; Robinho (yellow card) 76'; Guti (yellow card) 81'	Report	(yellow card) 20' Taddei; (yellow card) 36' De Rossi; (yellow card) 55' Perrotta; (yellow card) 67' Cicinho; 73' Taddei; (yellow card) 83' Aquilani; (yellow card) 84' Tonetto; 90+2' Vučinić	Stadium: Estadio Santiago Bernabéu; Attendance: 80,000; Referee: Vassaras (Greece)

=== Copa del Rey ===
==== Round of 32 ====
19 December 2007 1	Alicante	1–1	Real Madrid	Estadio José Rico Pérez
20:45 CET	(yellow card) 38' García; 61' (pen.) Borja; (yellow card) 84' Capi	Report	(yellow card) 54' Guti; (yellow card) 79' Gago; 90' Balboa	Attendance: 26,100; Referee: Ramírez Domínguez

2 January 2008 2	Real Madrid	2–1	Alicante	Estadio Santiago Bernabéu
20:00 CET	31' Robben; 90+2' Guti	Report	(yellow card) 56' Azkoitia; 63' Borja	Attendance: 55,200; Referee: González Vázquez

==== Round of 16 ====
10 January 2008 1	Mallorca	2–1	Real Madrid	Palma
22:00 CET	23' Trejo; Valero (yellow card) 26'; (yellow card) 33' Basinas; 50' Arango; (yellow card) 90' Héctor	Report	24' Higuaín; (yellow card) 85' Guti	Stadium: Son Moix; Attendance: 18,480; Referee: Delgado Ferreiro

16 January 2008 2	Real Madrid	0–1	Mallorca	Madrid
21:00 CET	(yellow card) 51' Guti; (yellow card) 73' Baptista; (yellow card) 90+2' Van Nistelrooy	Report	(yellow card) 45' Arango; (yellow card) 68' Gutiérrez; (yellow card) 76' Moyà; (yellow card) 79' Valero; 83' Ibagaza	Stadium: Estadio Santiago Bernabéu; Attendance: 68,000; Referee: Medina Cantalejo

=== Supercopa de España ===
11 August 2007 1st leg	Sevilla	1–0	Real Madrid	Estadio Ramón Sánchez Pizjuán
22:00 CET	28' (pen.) Luís Fabiano	Report		Attendance: 45,000; Referee: Pérez Burrull (Spain)

19 August 2007 2nd leg	Real Madrid	3–5	Sevilla	Estadio Santiago Bernabéu
22:00 CET	20' Drenthe; 44' Cannavaro; (yellow card) 58' Guti; (yellow card) 70', (goal) 79' Ramos; (yellow card) 35' (red card) 90' Pepe	Report	16', 29' Renato; (yellow card) 33' Alves; 36' (pen.), 81', 90' Kanouté; (yellow card) 77' Duda	Attendance: 69,000; Referee: Undiano Mallenco (Spain)

=== Friendlies ===
27 July 2007 Friendly	Stoke City	0–2	Real Madrid
		Report

31 July 2007 Friendly	Hannover 96	3–0	Real Madrid	Hanover, Germany
		Report		Stadium: AWD-Arena

==== Russian Railways Cup ====
3 August 2007 Semi-final	Lokomotiv Moscow	2–5	Real Madrid	Moscow, Russia
		Report		Stadium: Lokomotiv Stadium

5 August 2007 Final	PSV	2–1	Real Madrid	Moscow, Russia
		Report		Stadium: Lokomotiv Stadium

==== Teresa Herrera Trophy ====
8 August 2007 Semi-final	Belenenses	0–1	Real Madrid	A Coruña, Spain
		Report		Stadium: Estadio Riazor

9 August 2007 Final	Deportivo La Coruña	2–1	Real Madrid	A Coruña, Spain
		Report		Stadium: Estadio Riazor

==== Trofeo Ramón de Carranza ====
15 August 2007 Semi-final	Betis	1–0	Real Madrid	Cádiz, Spain
		Report		Stadium: Estadio Ramón de Carranza

16 August 2007 3rd place	Cádiz	1–3	Real Madrid	Cádiz, Spain
		Report		Stadium: Estadio Ramón de Carranza

==== Trofeo Santiago Bernabéu ====
5 December 2007 Final	Real Madrid	2–0	Partizan	Madrid, Spain
		Report		Stadium: Santiago Bernabéu Stadium

==== Majed Abdullah retiring festival ====
20 May 2008 Final	Al-Nassr	4–1	Real Madrid	Riyadh, Saudi Arabia
		Report		Stadium: King Fahd International Stadium

== Statistics ==
=== Squad stats ===
				Total			La Liga		UEFA Champions League		Copa del Rey		Spanish Super Cup	
No.	Pos.	Nat.	Name	Sts	App	Gls	App	Gls	App	Gls	App	Gls	App	Gls
1	GK	(Spain)	Casillas	46	46		36		8				2	
4	RB	(Spain)	Sergio Ramos	45	45	6	33	5	7		3		2	1
5	DF	(Italy)	Cannavaro	40	42	1	33		6		1		2	1
3	DF	(Portugal)	Pepe	23	25		19		3		1		2	
12	LB	(Brazil)	Marcelo	32	32		24		6		2			
23	MF	(Netherlands)	Sneijder	34	38	9	30	9	5		2		1	
6	DM	(Mali)	M. Diarra	33	38		30		6				2	
14	MF	(Spain)	Guti	39	45	4	32	3	7		4	1	2	
10	LW	(Brazil)	Robinho	35	42	15	32	11	6	4	2		2	
7	SS	(Spain)	Raúl	47	48	23	37	18	8	5	1		2	
17	FW	(Netherlands)	v. Nistelrooy	30	33	20	24	16	7	4	1		1	
13	GK	(Spain)	Codina	1	1		1							
25	GK	(Poland)	Dudek	5	5		1				4			
2	DF	(Spain)	M. Salgado	12	14		8		2		4			
21	DF	(Germany)	Metzelder	11	13		9		3		1			
16	LB	(Argentina)	Heinze	23	26	1	20	1	4		2			
22	LB	(Spain)	Torres	18	28		20		3		3		2	
15	MF	(Netherlands)	Drenthe	10	26	3	18	2	4		3		1	1
8	MF	(Argentina)	Gago	32	36		25		6		4		1	
19	MF	(Brazil)	Baptista	16	33	4	27	3	3	1	1		2	
11	LW	(Netherlands)	Robben	16	28	5	21	4	5		2	1		
24	MF	(Equatorial Guinea)	Balboa	2	11	2	5		2	1	2	1	2	
18	FW	(Argentina)	Saviola	7	17	3	9	3	2		4		2	
20	FW	(Argentina)	Higuaín	12	34	9	25	8	5		4	1		
9	FW	(Spain)	Soldado	2	8		5		1		2			

Last updated: 18 May 2008
Source: Match reports in competitive matches and LFP.com
Ordered by start team, game starts and position on pitch (from back right to front left)
0 shown as blank

=== Disciplinary record ===
N	Pos.	Nat.	Name	Yellow card	Second yellow card	Red card	Notes
14	CM	(Spain)	Guti	14	0	1	
22	RB	(Spain)	Miguel Torres	4	0	1	
4	RB	(Spain)	Sergio Ramos	17	3	0	
23	AM	(Netherlands)	Wesley Sneijder	8	0	0	
8	CM	(Argentina)	Fernando Gago	7	0	0	
16	LB	(Argentina)	Gabriel Heinze	7	0	0	
12	LB	(Brazil)	Marcelo	7	0	0	
3	CB	(Portugal)	Pepe	6	2	0	
6	DM	(Mali)	Mahamadou Diarra	6	0	0	
5	CB	(Italy)	Fabio Cannavaro	6	1	0	
2	RB	(Spain)	Míchel Salgado	5	0	0	
10	LW	(Brazil)	Robinho	5	0	0	
17	CF	(Netherlands)	Ruud van Nistelrooy	4	0	0	
1	GK	(Spain)	Iker Casillas	4	0	0	
11	LW	(Netherlands)	Arjen Robben	4	0	0	
19	FW	(Brazil)	Júlio Baptista	3	0	0	
7	CF	(Spain)	Raúl	3	0	0	
20	FW	(Argentina)	Gonzalo Higuaín	3	0	0	
15	LW	(Netherlands)	Royston Drenthe	1	0	0	
21	CB	(Germany)	Christoph Metzelder	1	0	0	

Last updated: 18 May 2008
Source: Competitive matches and LFB.com
Only competitive matches
(yellow card) = Number of bookings; (second yellow card) = Number of sending offs after a second yellow card; (red card) = Number of sending offs by a direct red card.

== See also ==
- 2007–08 La Liga
- 2007–08 Copa del Rey
- 2007–08 UEFA Champions League
