= Gonzalo Higuaín =

Argentina international footballer (born 1987)

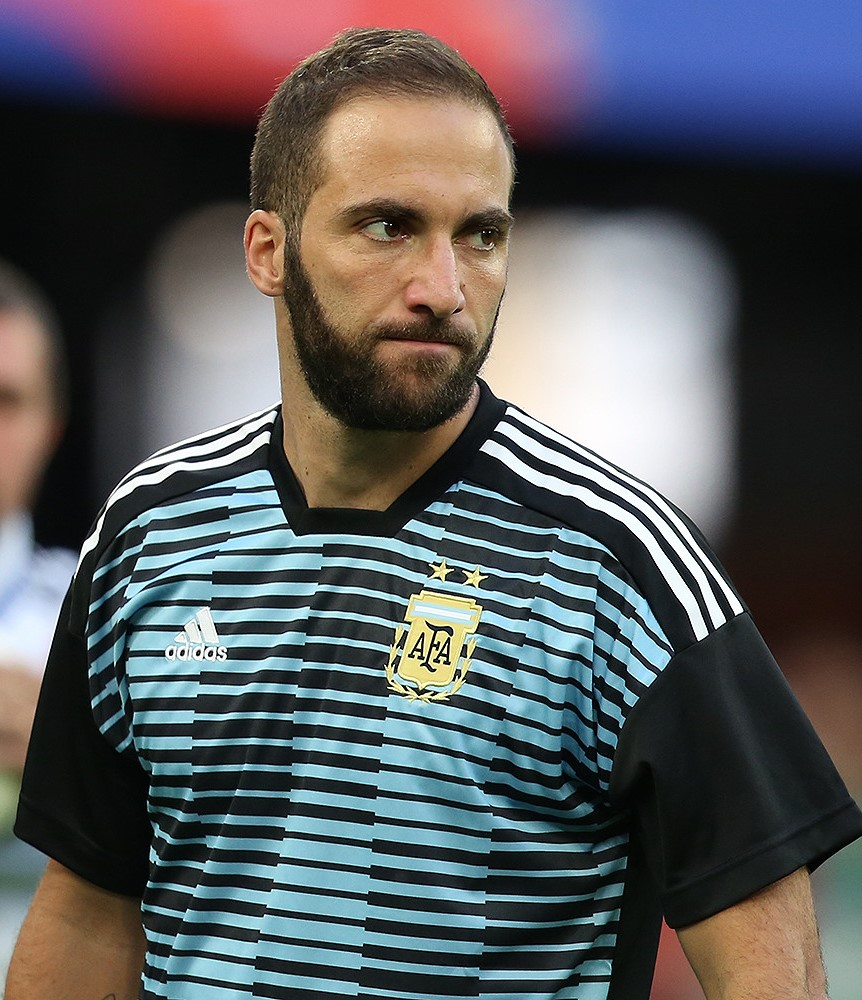
- Higuaín with Argentina during the 2018 FIFA World Cup

Personal information
- Full name: Gonzalo Gerardo Higuaín
- Date of birth: 10 December 1987 (age 38)
- Place of birth: Brest, France
- Height: 1.86 m (6 ft 1 in)
- Position: Striker

Team information
- Current team: Inter Miami (player development coach)

Youth career
- Palermo
- 1997–2005: River Plate

Senior career*
Years	Team	Apps	(Gls)
2005–2007	River Plate	35	(13)
2007–2013	Real Madrid	190	(107)
2013–2016	Napoli	104	(71)
2016–2020	Juventus	105	(48)
2018–2019	→ AC Milan (loan)	15	(6)
2019	→ Chelsea (loan)	14	(5)
2020–2022	Inter Miami	67	(29)
Total		530	(279)

International career
2008	Argentina U23	1	(2)
2009–2018	Argentina	75	(31)
Medal record
Men's football
Representing Argentina
FIFA World Cup
Runner-up	2014 Brazil
Copa América
Runner-up	2015 Chile
Runner-up	2016 United States
- * Club domestic league appearances and goals

Gonzalo Gerardo Higuaín (Spanish: [iɣwaˈin]; born 10 December 1987) is a professional football coach and former player who played as a striker. He is a player development coach for Major League Soccer club Inter Miami. Nicknamed El Pipita or Pipa, Higuaín was a prolific striker known for his eye for goal, strong physique, offensive movements and predatory finishing, and is considered to be one of the best strikers of his generation.

Higuaín started his career with Argentine club River Plate, before a transfer to Real Madrid in January 2007. After lacklustre performances in his first two seasons, Higuaín went on to score 97 goals in his next 146 games for Madrid, and was pivotal in the club's historic 100 points tally in the 2011–12 La Liga title win. His time in Spain saw him win three La Liga titles in total. In 2013, Higuaín joined Italian side Napoli for €40 million. in his first season, he helped his club win the Coppa Italia, which was only their second domestic honour since 1990. In the 2015–16 season, he was vital in Napoli's title race with Juventus, scoring 36 goals to win the Capocannoniere title and breaking the record for most goals in a Serie A season.

Italian champions Juventus signed Higuaín for €90 million in 2016, becoming one of the most expensive transfers of all time and the highest ever transfer for an Italian club. He won domestic doubles in his first two seasons with Juventus, also reaching the 2017 Champions League final. At Juventus, Higuaín scored his 100th goal in Serie A, making him only the second player to score over 100 goals in two of the top European leagues in the past 20 seasons. He went on to have loan spells at AC Milan and Chelsea, winning the UEFA Europa League with the latter. He signed for American side Inter Miami in 2020 before retiring in 2022.

Born in France to Argentine parents, Higuaín obtained Argentine citizenship in 2007, having previously only been a French national. He made his full international debut for Argentina in 2009; he represented the country at three FIFA World Cups and three Copa América tournaments, helping them to second-place finishes at the 2014 World Cup, the 2015 Copa América, and the Copa América Centenario in 2016. After no longer being called-up following Argentina's round-of-16 exit at the 2018 World Cup, he announced his retirement from international football in March 2019. In total, he earned 75 caps for his nation, scoring 31 goals.

== Early life ==
"Ronaldo, the Brazilian one, was the best at everything. He is the only player who I have watched on video and tried to imitate, but it's very hard".

— Higuaín on his idol growing up, Brazil striker Ronaldo.

Higuaín was born on 10 December 1987 in Brest, France, the son of the Argentine footballer Jorge Higuaín, who was then playing for Stade Brestois 29. He is of Basque-French descent through his grandfather. He left France at the age of ten months and does not speak French, but retains French citizenship. He successfully applied for Argentine nationality in January 2007.

Higuaín has two elder brothers, Nicolás, his agent during his career, and Federico, who also played as a professional footballer, and one younger brother, Lautaro.

== Club career ==
=== River Plate ===
Higuaín started playing in the youth teams and made his debut with River Plate in a 2–1 defeat against Gimnasia y Esgrima (LP) on 29 May 2005. On 12 February 2006, he scored his first league goal in a 3–1 victory over Banfield. Higuaín ended the 2005–06 season with 5 goals in 12 appearances.

Following his brace in the Superclásico derby against Boca Juniors on 8 October 2006, River Plate manager Daniel Passarella declared that Higuaín had an "enormous future" and was "destined for superstardom". By the end of that season, he scored 10 goals in 17 league matches.

=== Real Madrid ===
==== 2006–07 season ====
In December 2006, Spanish club Real Madrid signed Higuaín for €12 million from River Plate. His debut came on 11 January 2007 against Real Betis in the second round of the Copa del Rey in Seville. His first league game came three days later, on 14 January 2007, against Real Zaragoza at home. Higuaín was involved in the creation of numerous scoring chances and in the assistance for the only goal, which earned Madrid the victory. His first goal with Real came on 24 February when the team faced Atlético Madrid in the Madrid derby, the equaliser (1–1) at the Vicente Calderón Stadium. During his first season at the Bernabéu, however, Higuaín raised some doubts over his performance due to his overall lack of goals.

==== 2007–08 season ====
During the 2007–08 season, Higuaín played inconsistently, although he finished strongly at the end of the season: He first scored a last minute goal to earn his team a victory in a 2–1 comeback against Osasuna, which allowed Real Madrid to be mathematically crowned Liga champions for the second consecutive year. Four days later, he scored the third goal of a 4–1 thrashing of Barcelona in El Clásico. The goal was scored just 57 seconds after he came off the bench.

==== 2008–09 season ====
In the 2008–09 season, Higuaín was offered the chance to be a starter due to a serious injury suffered by Dutch striker Ruud van Nistelrooy. In August 2008, Higuaín scored the winner in Madrid's victory over Valencia in the Supercopa de España. Shortly afterwards, he scored all four goals in a 4–3 win against Málaga. Because of this, he started to gain international recognition and became one of the leading goalscorers of La Liga, alongside his Barcelona counterpart Samuel Eto'o. On 21 April 2009, Higuaín played very well in the match against Getafe and scored the decisive goal in the last minute, giving Real Madrid a 3–2 victory which enabled the team to keep close to Pep Guardiola's Barcelona in the league table. Throughout the season, Higuaín was regarded as one of the most promising talents in world football in the wake of spectacular games and last-minute goals. He ended the season with 22 league goals and 24 in all competitions, around as many as established football stars including Diego Forlán, David Villa and Thierry Henry.

==== 2009–10 season ====
The 2009–10 season saw Higuaín become Real's top goalscorer with 27 league goals, 29 in total, being at the same time the La Liga's second-top goalscorer, behind only Lionel Messi and surpassing Swedish international Zlatan Ibrahimović, as well as his Madrid teammate Cristiano Ronaldo. This season included him scoring his first two goals in the UEFA Champions League and his second hat-trick for the club.

==== 2010–11 season ====
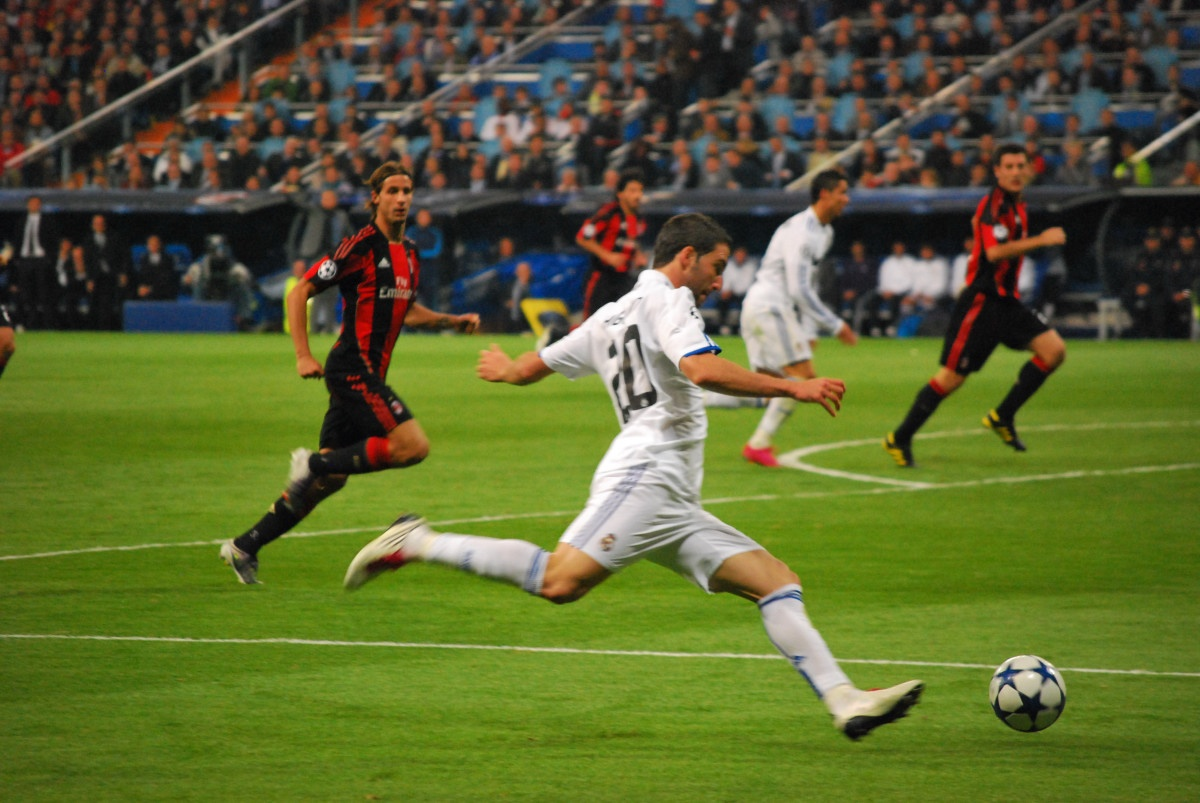
Higuaín during a match in the Champions League group stage against AC Milan in October 2010

In June 2010, Real Madrid extended Higuaín's contract until 2016. On 23 October 2010, he scored Real Madrid's 5,200th league goal, coming against Racing de Santander in a 6–1 thrashing by Los Blancos. On 4 November of the same year, Higuaín scored the club's 700th goal in the Champions League.

During the first weeks of December 2010, Higuaín was diagnosed with a herniated lumbar disc, and Real's medical staff suggested that he should have it operated. On 5 January 2011, Real Madrid announced he would finally undergo surgery at the Department of Neurological Surgery of Chicago's Northwestern University Feinberg School of Medicine under the command of Dr. Richard G. Fessler, M.D. The surgery took place on 11 January, and Higuaín was discharged from the hospital the next day following a successful operation. He was expected to spend at least four months away from the field in the recovery process: two months spent to recover from the surgery and another two to train with the team, although he was able to make an early comeback. On 23 April 2011, Higuaín scored a hat-trick against Valencia in a 6–3 away win at the Mestalla Stadium, giving him eight goals in eight matches against Valencia. Higuaín also assisted two other goals for Karim Benzema and Kaká in that same match.

==== 2011–12 season ====
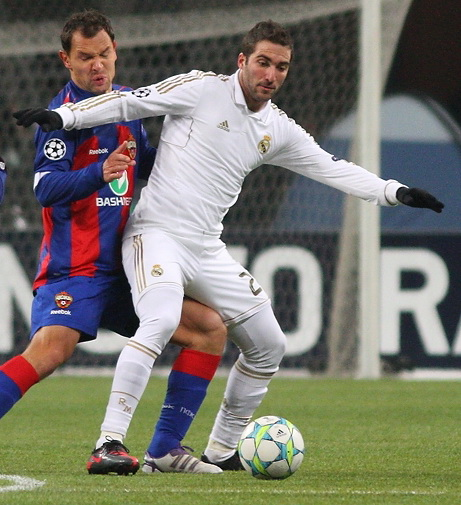
Higuaín in a Champions League game against CSKA Moscow in February 2012

On 2 October, Higuaín scored his first hat-trick of the season against Espanyol in a 4–0 away win, following it 13 days later with another in a 4–1 win against Betis.

Higuaín scored to put Madrid up 3–1 in a 4–1 win against local rivals Atlético Madrid in the Madrid derby on 26 November. On 31 March 2012, he scored his 100th Real Madrid goal in a match against Osasuna, also adding a second goal to make it Real's 100th goal for the 2011–12 La Liga season. In the league-winning season, he scored 22 goals, more than his teammate Karim Benzema, and proved to be a vital player for his team.

==== 2012–13 season ====
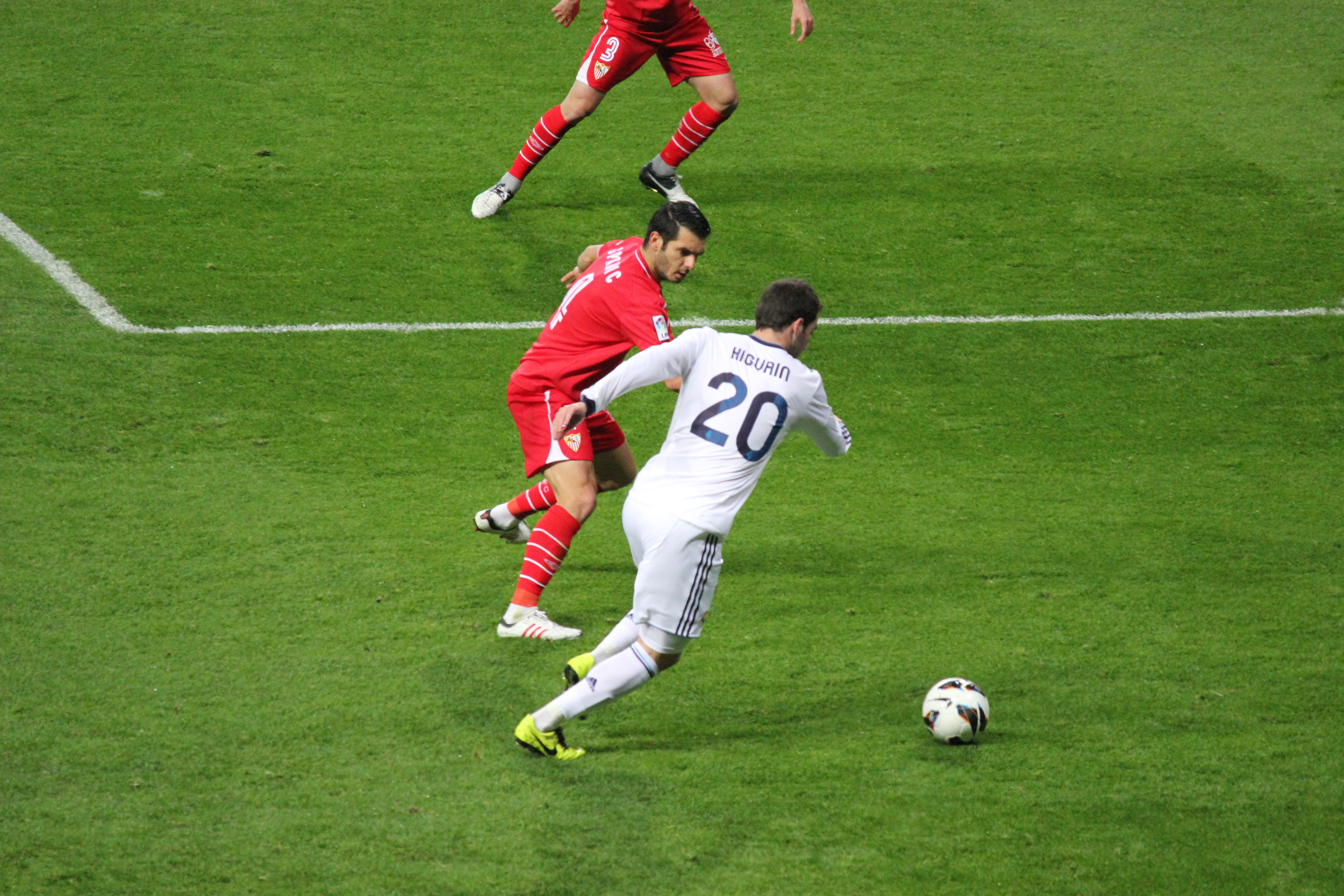
Higuaín attempting to dribble past Emir Spahić of Sevilla in February 2013

On 29 August 2012, Higuaín scored the opener in an eventual 2–1 win against Barcelona in the second leg of the 2012 Supercopa de España, which secured Real Madrid its first title of the season.

Higuaín scored first league goal in the season opener against Valencia CF, his favourite opponent; he netted the opening goal in the 10th minute in an eventual 1–1 home draw. He scored again in the next match, a 2–1 loss to Getafe CF at Coliseum Alfonso Pérez, which marked Real Madrid worst league start in 39 years.

In Real's away match to Mallorca on 28 October 2012, Higuaín scored twice and provided two assists in a 5–0 victory. On 23 February 2013, he scored his 100th La Liga goal as he scored an 88th-minute winner to secure a 2–1 defeat of Deportivo de La Coruña.

On 1 June 2013, following the end of the team's last match of the season, a 4–2 home win over Osasuna, Higuaín, who scored the opening goal, confirmed that he would be leaving Real Madrid at the end of the season, after six and a half years.

=== Napoli ===
Due to Higuaín's availability in the summer of 2013, several high-profile clubs, such as Arsenal and Napoli, were keen to sign him. Higuaín was at the centre of much transfer speculation, with many newspapers linking him to a move to Premier League side Arsenal, before Napoli's president Aurelio De Laurentiis said that Higuaín, along with Liverpool goalkeeper Pepe Reina, had passed their medicals and that the Argentine had signed a five-year deal with the Italian club, with Higuaín joining for €40 million. On 27 July, Napoli confirmed the signing of Higuaín, with the Argentine being assigned the number 9 shirt.

==== 2013–14 season ====
On 10 August 2013, Higuaín played his first match as a starter in a pre-season friendly against Benfica, scoring his first goal for the club in a 2–1 win. On 25 August, he made his Serie A debut in a 3–0 defeat of Bologna on the opening day of the 2013–14 season. A week later, he opened his goalscoring account in a 4–2 win away at Chievo. He followed this up with goals in Napoli's next two fixtures: wins over Atalanta at home and AC Milan at the San Siro.

On 18 September, Higuaín scored in Napoli's opening Champions League fixture, a 2–1 victory over Borussia Dortmund at the Stadio San Paolo. He went on to score in home wins over Marseille and Arsenal, but Napoli failed to qualify from the group stage despite winning four of their six matches.

On 12 February 2014, Higuaín scored two goals in Napoli's 3–0 defeat of Roma in the semi-final of the Coppa Italia, taking the team to the final with a 5–3 aggregate victory. On 13 April, he scored his first hat-trick for the club in a 4–2 win over Lazio. Higuaín won his first trophy with the club on 3 May, playing for 70 minutes in the 3–1 success versus Fiorentina in the final of Coppa Italia. He concluded his first season in Italy by scoring 24 goals in 46 appearances in all competitions.

==== 2014–15 season ====
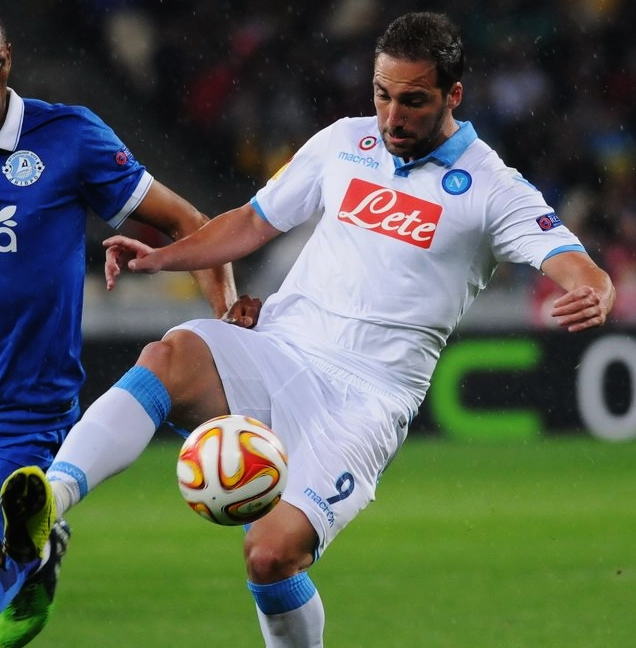
Higuaín in action against Dnipro in May 2015

On 26 October 2014, Higuaín scored his first three league goals of the season in a 6–2 home win over Hellas Verona. In the 2014 Supercoppa Italiana against Juventus in Doha, Qatar, on 22 December, Higuaín equalised twice, forcing extra time and then a penalty shootout, in which he was one of the scorers in a Napoli victory.

Higuaín scored a hat-trick, including a penalty, on 12 March 2015, as Napoli came from behind to defeat Dynamo Moscow 3–1 in the first leg of the last 16 of the UEFA Europa League.

In the final game of the league season – and also the last under Napoli manager Rafael Benítez – Higuaín scored twice, but also missed a penalty, as Napoli lost 4–2 to Lazio, who took the last Champions League place at their expense.

==== 2015–16 season ====
On 8 November 2015, Higuaín recorded the 200th goal of his club career, the only goal of the match in a victory over Udinese; this was his ninth goal of the league season and his seventh consecutive home game with a goal. Three weeks later, he scored both goals – including one after 64 seconds – in a 2–1 win over Inter which put Napoli in first place in the league for the first time in 25 years.

Higuaín scored twice in Napoli's 3–1 win over Sassuolo on 16 January 2016 to extend the team's lead to four points; his second goal of the game was his 20th of the campaign. He scored his 30th goal of the Serie A season in a 3–1 away defeat to Udinese on 3 April, although he was sent off later during the match. In the following days, the Serie A issued a four-match ban against Higuaín; a one-game ban for his two yellow cards, one for "protesting against the match officials", one for "misconduct against an opponent" and one for appearing to push referee Massimiliano Irrati, as well as a €20,000 fine. On 15 April, following an appeal on his ban, it was reduced to three matches.

On 14 May, Higuaín scored a hat-trick in a 4–0 home win over Frosinone in the final match of the season to win the Capocannoniere with 36 total goals, achieving the record for goals in a Serie A season. No other player in the league surpassed 20 goals for the season, with the league's second-topscorer being Paulo Dybala with 19.

=== Juventus ===
==== 2016–17 season ====
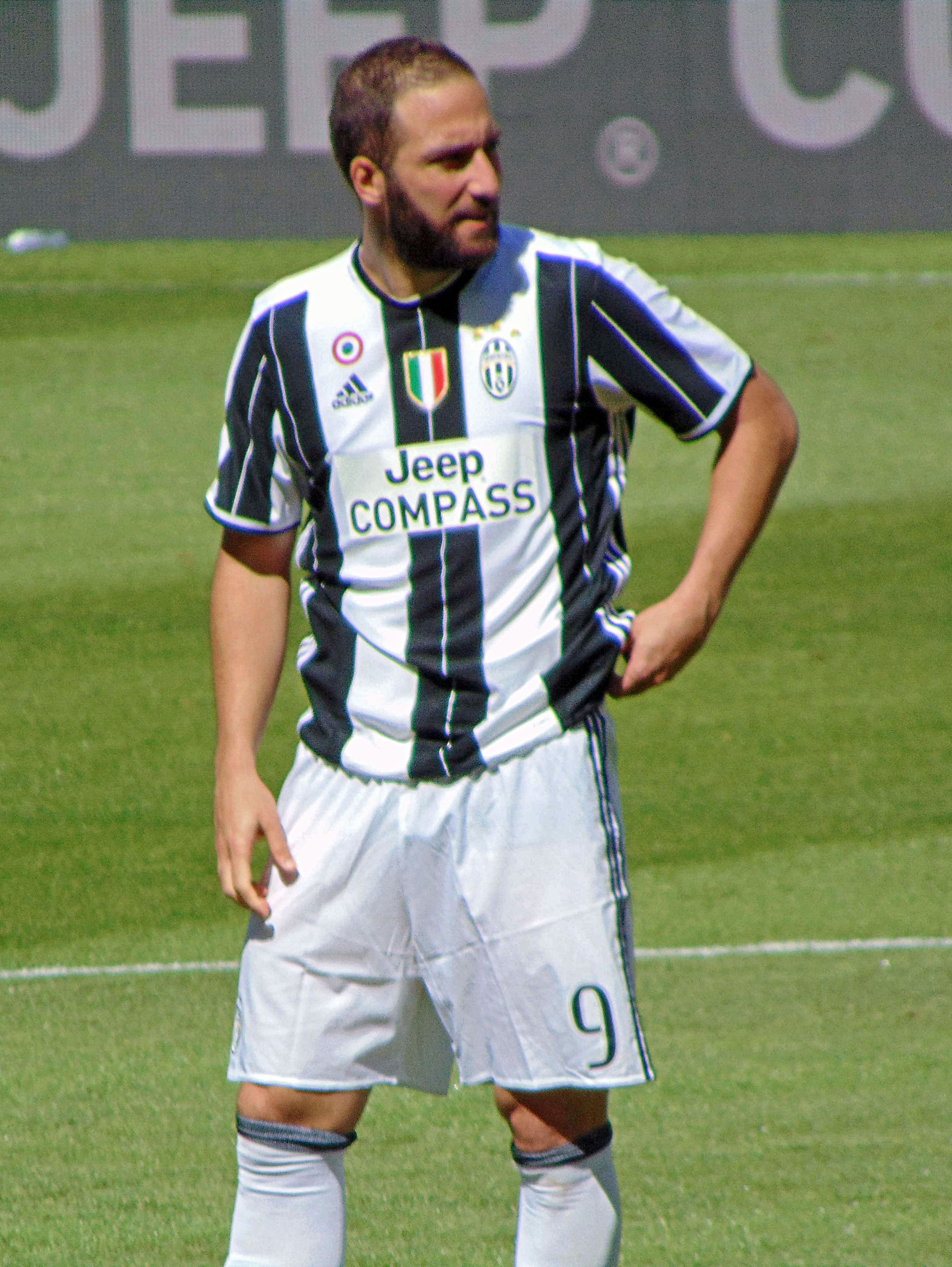
Higuaín playing for Juventus in 2017

After a month of transfer speculation, on 26 July 2016, Higuaín transferred to rivals Juventus for a fee of €90 million paid in two installments, making him the most expensive South American footballer of all time (until Neymar's transfer to Paris Saint-Germain in 2017); his transfer fee was the highest ever paid by an Italian team (until Cristiano Ronaldo's transfer to Juventus in 2018) and also the highest of a player transferring within any domestic league (until Kylian Mbappé's transfer to Paris Saint-Germain in 2018). Three days after his move, Higuaín stated that his reason for moving to Juventus was because of his relationship with Napoli's chairman Aurelio De Laurentiis.

On 20 August, Higuaín scored the winning goal on his Juventus debut in their opening match against Fiorentina of a 2–1 home win. On 10 September, he scored a brace in a 3–1 home win over Sassuolo. On 29 October, he scored the winning goal against his former team, Napoli, but did not celebrate his goal, in a 2–1 home win. On 5 April 2017, Higuaín scored twice against Napoli in the 2016–17 Coppa Italia second semi-final leg to put Juventus through to the final 5–4 on aggregate, in spite of a 3–2 away loss. The following week, he became the first player to score more than 20 goals in his debut season for Juventus since John Charles and Omar Sívori had managed the same feat during the 1957–58 Serie A season, when he scored a brace against Chievo. On 15 April, Higuaín scored both goals in a 2–0 away win against Pescara, which included his 200th league goal in Europe. On 3 June, Higuaín started in the Champions League Final, but Juventus were defeated 4–1 by defending champions, Higuaín's former club, Real Madrid; he set up Mario Mandžukić's temporary equaliser in the first half.

==== 2017–18 season ====
On 28 October 2017, Higuaín scored both goals in a 2–0 away win over Milan; his first goal was his 100th goal in Serie A, making him only the second player after Zlatan Ibrahimović to score over 100 goals in two of the top European leagues in the past 20 seasons.

Higuaín played a decisive role in Juventus's 4–3 aggregate win over Tottenham Hotspur in the round of 16 of the UEFA Champions League. In the first leg, held in Turin on 13 February 2018, he scored both of his side's goals in the opening ten minutes, with his second of the night coming from the penalty spot, although he later also missed another penalty right before half time, which drew criticism in the Italian media, despite his positive overall performance; following a comeback from Tottenham, however, the match eventually ended in a 2–2 draw. In the return leg, on 7 March, he helped Juventus come from behind to win the match 2–1 at Wembley Stadium, first scoring the equaliser, before setting up the match winner scored by Dybala three minutes later, thus sealing Juventus's place in the quarter-finals of the competition.

==== 2018–19 season: Loans to AC Milan and Chelsea ====
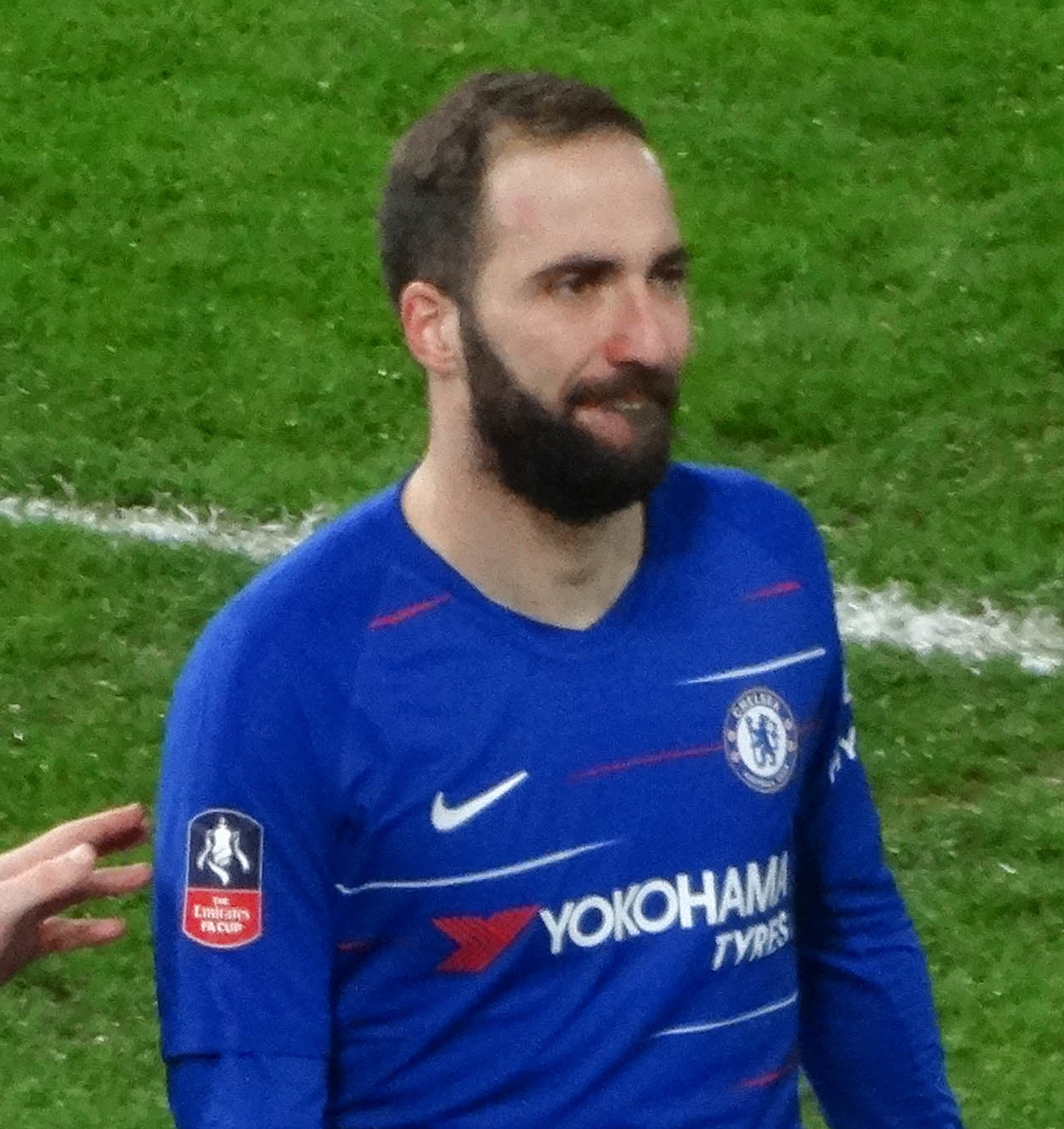
Higuaín on loan at Chelsea in 2019

On 2 August 2018, Higuaín was signed by AC Milan on a season-long loan deal. As per the official statement of Juventus, Milan would pay a loan fee of €18 million to Juventus in the 2018–19 season; also Milan would have the option to outright buy Higuaín the following season for €36 million.

On 23 January 2019, English club Chelsea signed Higuaín on a loan deal for the remainder of the 2018–19 season, reuniting him with manager Maurizio Sarri, whom he played under at Napoli during the 2015–16 season. Five days later, he made his debut in a 3–0 win against Sheffield Wednesday in the fourth round of the FA Cup at Stamford Bridge. On 30 January, he made his league debut in a 4–0 away loss against AFC Bournemouth. On 2 February, he scored his first goals for Chelsea, a brace in a 5–0 home win over Huddersfield Town.

==== 2019–20 season: Return to Juventus ====
On 1 July 2019, Higuaín returned to Juventus as Chelsea declined to extend his loan; thus, he was once again reunited with manager Maurizio Sarri, who had recently joined the club. Although he previously wore the number 9 shirt at Juventus, he was instead handed the number 21 shirt ahead of the 2019–20 season. He scored his first goal of the season in a 4–3 home win over his former club Napoli in Serie A on 31 August.

On 17 September 2020, he mutually terminated his contract with Juventus.

=== Inter Miami ===
On 18 September 2020, Higuaín signed for Major League Soccer club Inter Miami. On his debut, he missed a penalty and then started a fight as Miami fell to a 3–0 defeat to the Philadelphia Union. On 7 October, Higuaín scored his first goal for Miami, a late free kick in their 2–1 win against the New York Red Bulls. On 31 July 2022, Higuaín scored another free-kick for Inter Miami, and then netted two more goals to complete a first-half hat-trick in 27 minutes against FC Cincinnati in a 4–4 draw. Higuaín retired at the end of Inter Miami's 2022 MLS season; his last game was in the first round of the MLS playoffs, ending in 3–0 away loss to New York City FC.

== International career ==
=== Early career ===
Higuaín is one of only four foreign-born players to have played for Argentina in a FIFA World Cup, along with Pedro Arico Suárez, Constantino Urbieta Sosa and Nico Paz. He initially rejected calls from both the Argentina and France national teams, stating at the time he had not yet decided which country he would play for, before ultimately choosing Argentina. Higuaín was called up by the Argentina Olympic squad for a friendly match against Guatemala in February 2008, and scored two goals on his debut as Argentina won 5–0, though the match was not officially recognized by FIFA as an "A" international match.

=== 2010 FIFA World Cup ===
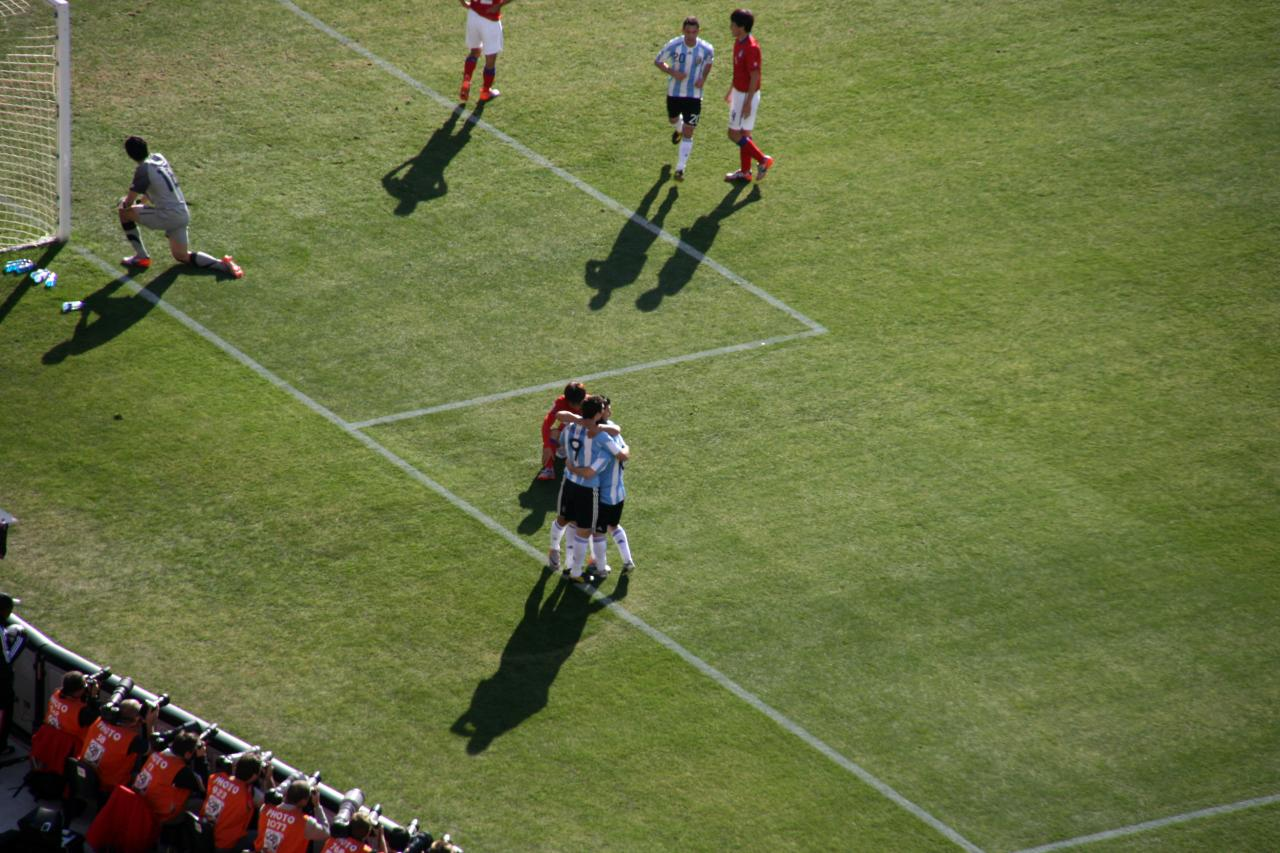
Higuaín (#9) celebrates his hat-trick against South Korea with teammates during the World Cup on 17 June 2010.

Higuaín was selected for Argentina by coach Diego Maradona for the last 2010 FIFA World Cup qualification games against Peru and Uruguay. He scored his first goal on his full debut, a 49th-minute strike during a 2–1 win over Peru on 10 October 2009. Following Argentina's qualification, Higuaín was included in the squad for the 2010 FIFA World Cup. He scored a hat-trick in Argentina's 4–1 win over South Korea in their second group match, becoming the third Argentinian to score a hat-trick in the World Cup finals after Guillermo Stábile in 1930 and Gabriel Batistuta in 1994 and 1998, and the first player to score a hat-trick in the tournament since 2002. His goal in the 3–1 win over Mexico in the second round took him to a total of four, sending him clear as the second-top goalscorer in the competition.

=== 2011 Copa América ===
Higuaín was a member of Sergio Batista's Argentine squad for the 2011 Copa América on home soil, making one substitute appearance and one start in the group as Carlos Tevez was preferred at centre forward; Argentina advanced in second place behind Colombia. He started against Uruguay in the quarter-finals in Santa Fe, and equalised in the 17th minute by heading Lionel Messi's cross past goalkeeper Fernando Muslera; he later had another goal disallowed for offside. Higuaín scored in the penalty shoot-out after his shot had hit both posts, but Argentina lost the shoot-out 4–5.

=== 2011–2014: 2014 World Cup qualifying ===
On 8 October 2011, Higuaín scored a hat-trick and assisted one goal in a 4–1 win against Chile. On 2 June 2012, he scored the second goal in their 2014 World Cup qualifying match and assisted one goal in Argentina's 4–0 victory over Ecuador.

On 7 September 2012, Higuaín scored the second goal in their 2014 World Cup South American qualifier match and assisted one goal in Argentina's 3–1 victory over Paraguay. Then, on 11 September, Higuaín scored the equalizer for Argentina in a 1–1 draw with Peru in Lima.

On 22 March 2013, Higuaín scored twice as Argentina beat Venezuela 3–0 to make him top scorer in the South American section of World Cup qualifying with nine goals. He ended the 2014 qualifying campaign as the joint third-top scorer in CONMEBOL, alongside Radamel Falcao and behind Messi and Luis Suárez.

=== 2014 World Cup ===
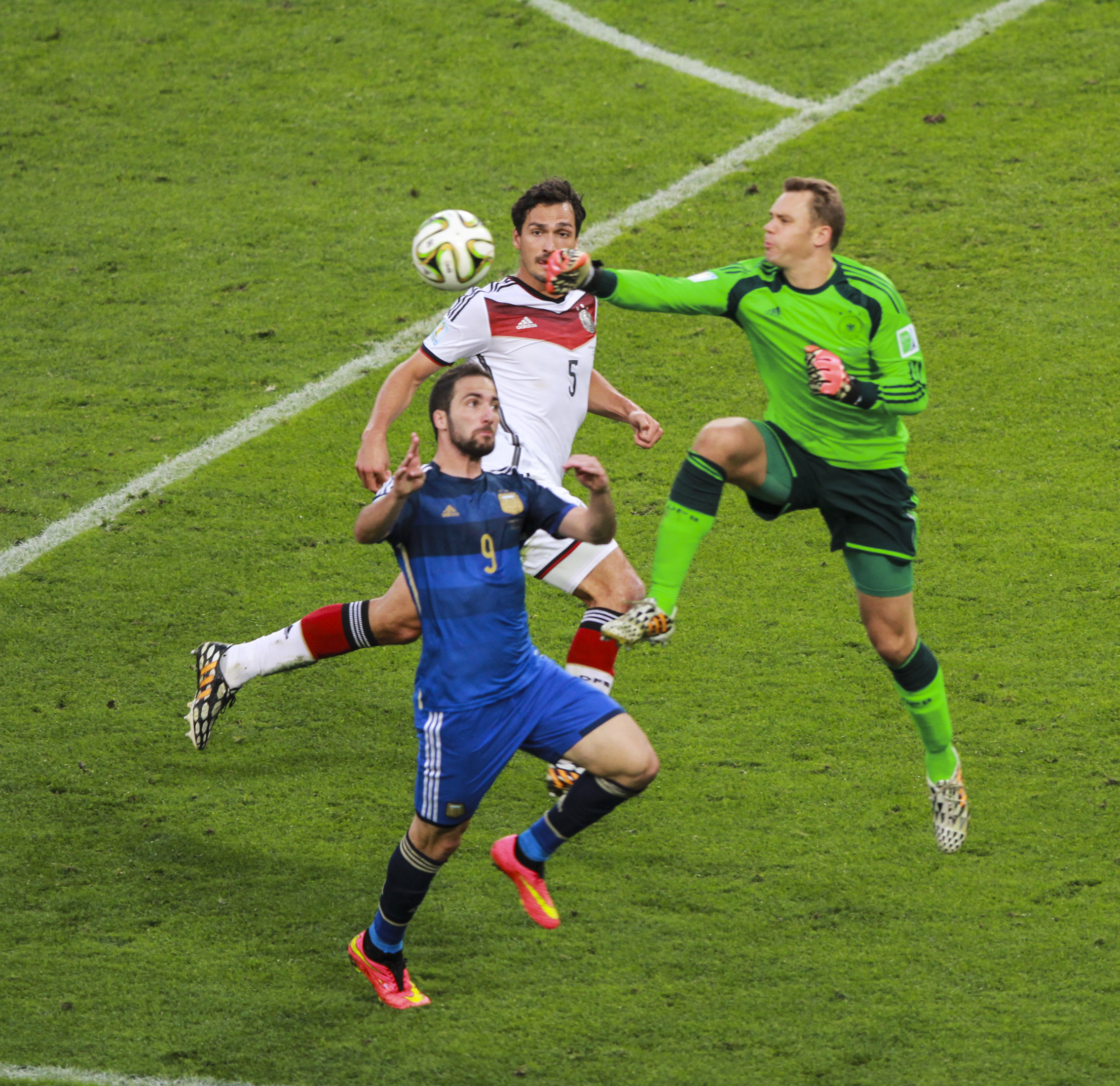
Higuaín challenging Germany's Mats Hummels and Manuel Neuer in the 2014 World Cup Final

Higuaín was named by manager Alejandro Sabella in Argentina's 23-man squad for the 2014 World Cup in May. After appearing as a half-time substitute in Argentina's 2–1 defeat of Bosnia and Herzegovina at the Maracanã Stadium on 15 June, Higuaín exchanged passes with Messi to assist his captain for the winning goal. He was named in the starting line-up for the team's second match against Iran in Belo Horizonte on 21 June, which ended in a 1–0 victory to Argentina. On 5 July, he scored the only goal of the match in the 1–0 quarter-final victory over Belgium. In the final against Germany on 13 July, Higuaín shot wide on a one-on-one chance against Germany goalkeeper Manuel Neuer after being gifted an errant, headed back-pass from Toni Kroos, and had a goal disallowed for offside, as Germany eventually won the match 1–0 in extra time.

=== 2015 Copa América ===
With Sergio Agüero preferred as the lone centre-forward in a three-man Argentine attack, Higuaín made his first start of the 2015 Copa América in the final group match, against Jamaica in Viña del Mar. Winning his 50th cap, he scored the only goal of the game in the 11th minute when set up by Ángel Di María, sending Argentina through to the quarter-finals as group winners. On 30 June, he scored the final goal of Argentina's 6–1 win over Paraguay in the semi-finals, two minutes after coming on in place of Agüero. On 4 July, Higuaín was one of two Argentina players to fail to convert their kicks in a penalty shootout loss to Chile in the 2015 Copa América Final, blasting his attempt over the crossbar; during regulation time he had previously been provided with a late goalscoring opportunity, but failed to convert Ezequiel Lavezzi's low cross.

=== Copa América Centenario ===
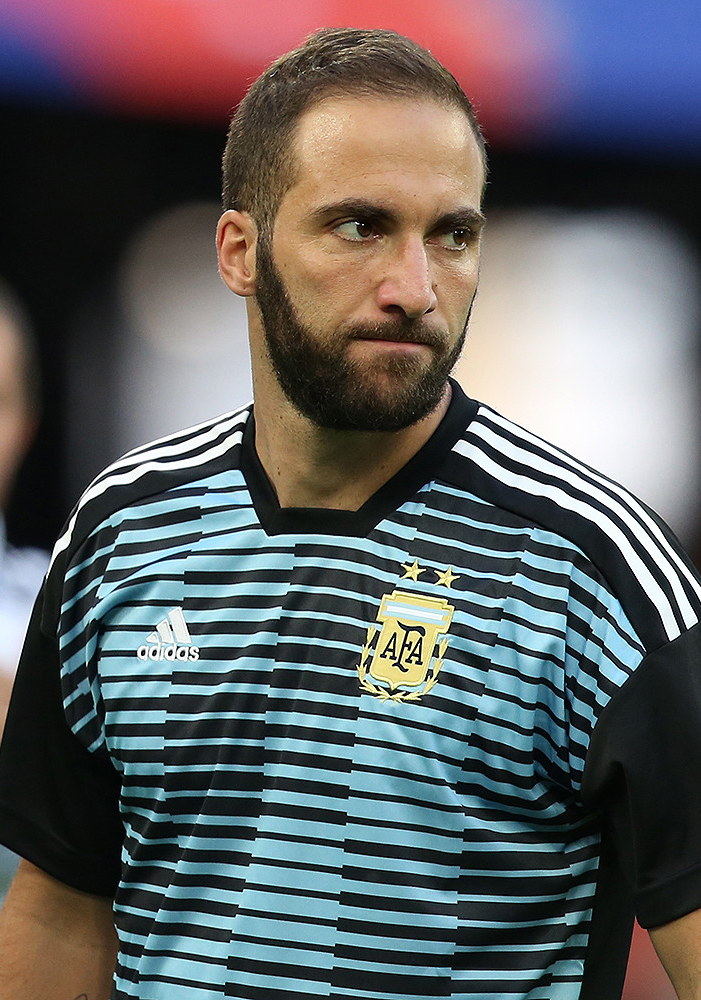
Higuaín with Argentina at the 2018 FIFA World Cup

At the Copa América Centenario in 2016, Higuaín was named to Gerardo Martino's 23-man Argentina squad, and was selected as his team's starting centre forward. On 18 June, he scored twice in the team's 4–1 quarter-final defeat of Venezuela. Three days later, he once again scored two goals as Argentina defeated the hosts United States 4–0 in the semi-final. He played in the final against Chile eight days later, a repeat of the previous year's final, as the Albiceleste once again lost in a penalty shootout following a 0–0 draw after extra time. Following the match, Higuaín once again came under criticism in the media for squandering a one on one opportunity for the third consecutive final with Argentina.

=== 2018 World Cup ===
During Argentina's troublesome qualifying campaign for the 2018 FIFA World Cup in Russia, Higuaín managed only one goal in nine appearances, and eventually lost his place in the team's starting line-up. In May 2018, however, Higuaín was included in Jorge Sampaoli's final 23-man Argentina squad for the tournament. He appeared in all three group matches for Argentina, but went scoreless throughout the competition, and did not feature in the round of 16 match against eventual champions France on 30 June, which saw Argentina eliminated from the World Cup following a 4–3 defeat.

=== National team retirement ===
On 28 March 2019, in an interview with Fox Sports Argentina, Higuaín announced his retirement from international football, where he defended himself, commenting: "My era with the Selecc[í]on is over, now I will be watching the team from the outside, which I'm sure will make many people happy. So now that you can stop worrying if I'm here or not. I spoke to [Coach Lionel] Scaloni and told him my point of view. This is my decision and I think it will do me good. I want to enjoy more time with my family and I see they suffer when I am so roundly criticised. I am happy with the decision I have made. I played almost 8 years in the team, it's a lot, even if people don't take dimension." In total, he made 75 senior appearances for Argentina, scoring 31 goals. His final international appearance came in Argentina's 2–1 win over Nigeria on 26 June 2018, in their final group match of the 2018 World Cup, at the Krestovsky Stadium, Saint Petersburg.

== Style of play ==
Nicknamed El Pipita or Pipa, as was his father Jorge, who was also a footballer, Higuaín was a hardworking right-footed striker and a prolific goalscorer. He was known in particular for his great striking ability with either foot in the last 25 yards, as well as his opportunism and clinical finishing inside the penalty area, while his height, eye for goal, and strong physique made him a dangerous aerial presence in the box. A well-rounded striker, he also possessed good technical skills, and an ability to drop deep, link-up with teammates, hold up the ball, and lay it off to other players. His intelligent offensive movement off the ball and pace in the final third of the pitch made him an offensive threat during counter-attacks, and also allowed him to lose his markers and get on the end of passes, or create space for his teammates with his attacking runs. Although he mainly played as an out-and-out striker (which led him to be described as a "poacher" in the media earlier on in his career), because of his team-play and ability to build attacks or provide assists for teammates, he also operated in a deeper, more creative role on occasion, acting as a false nine, or even as a second striker. His playing style earned him comparisons with compatriots Hernán Crespo and Gabriel Batistuta.

Despite his impressive scoring record, Higuaín was often criticised in the media for failing to deliver in the most important of matches for both club and country. Notable examples include poor performances in cup finals and crucial UEFA Champions League and UEFA Europa League matches during his tenures at Real Madrid, Napoli and Juventus, as well as notable missed chances for the Argentina national team in the 2014 World Cup Final, the 2015 Copa América Final and the Copa América Centenario Final. Moreover, Higuaín's record from the penalty spot was inconsistent throughout his career; in his early career, he was generally an accurate penalty taker, however his ability from spot kicks deteriorated as his career progressed.

== Endorsements ==
Higuaín, along with global cover star Lionel Messi, featured on the Italian cover of EA Sports' multi-platform video game FIFA 15.

== Career statistics ==
=== Club ===
Appearances and goals by club, season and competition
Club	Season	League			National cup (Note: Includes Copa del Rey, Coppa Italia, FA Cup, U.S. Open Cup)		Continental		Other		Total	
Club	Season	Division	Apps	Goals	Apps	Goals	Apps	Goals	Apps	Goals	Apps	Goals
River Plate	2004–05	Argentine Primera División	4	0	0	0	0	0	—		4	0
River Plate	2005–06	Argentine Primera División	14	5	0	0	4 (Note: Appearances in Copa Libertadores)	2	—		18	7
River Plate	2006–07	Argentine Primera División	17	8	0	0	2	0	—		19	8
River Plate	Total		35	13	0	0	6	2	—		41	15
Real Madrid	2006–07	La Liga	19	2	2	0	2 (Note: Appearances in UEFA Champions League)	0	—		23	2
Real Madrid	2007–08	La Liga	25	8	4	1	5	0	—		34	9
Real Madrid	2008–09	La Liga	34	22	2	1	7	0	1 (Note: Appearance(s) in Supercopa de España)	1	44	24
Real Madrid	2009–10	La Liga	32	27	1	0	7	2	—		40	29
Real Madrid	2010–11	La Liga	17	10	2	1	6	2	—		25	13
Real Madrid	2011–12	La Liga	35	22	5	1	12	3	2	0	54	26
Real Madrid	2012–13	La Liga	28	16	5	0	9	1	2	1	44	18
Real Madrid	Total		190	107	21	4	48	8	5	2	264	121
Napoli	2013–14	Serie A	32	17	5	2	9 (Note: Five appearances and four goals in UEFA Champions League, four appearances and one goal in UEFA Europa League)	5	—		46	24
Napoli	2014–15	Serie A	37	18	4	1	16 (Note: Two appearances and one goal in UEFA Champions League, fourteen appearances and seven goals in UEFA Europa League)	8	1 (Note: Appearance in Supercoppa Italiana)	2	58	29
Napoli	2015–16	Serie A	35	36	2	0	5 (Note: Appearances in UEFA Europa League)	2	—		42	38
Napoli	Total		104	71	11	3	30	15	1	2	146	91
Juventus	2016–17	Serie A	38	24	4	3	12	5	1	0	55	32
Juventus	2017–18	Serie A	35	16	4	2	10	5	1	0	50	23
Juventus	2019–20	Serie A	32	8	3	1	8	2	1	0	44	11
Juventus	Total		105	48	11	6	30	12	3	0	149	66
AC Milan (loan)	2018–19	Serie A	15	6	1	0	5	2	1	0	22	8
Chelsea (loan)	2018–19	Premier League	14	5	2	0	2	0	1 (Note: Appearance in EFL Cup)	0	19	5
Inter Miami	2020	MLS	9	1	—		—		—		9	1
Inter Miami	2021	MLS	30	12	—		—		—		30	12
Inter Miami	2022	MLS	28	16	2	0	—		1 (Note: Appearance in MLS Cup Playoffs)	0	31	16
Inter Miami	Total		67	29	2	0	—		1	0	70	29
Career total			530	279	48	13	121	39	12	4	711	335

=== International ===
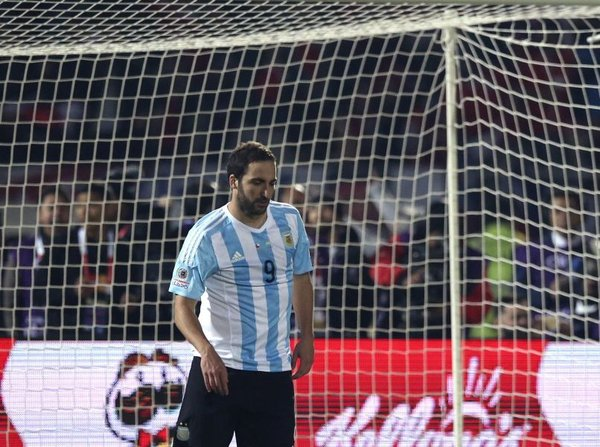
Higuaín in Argentine colours

Appearances and goals by national team and year
National team	Year	Apps	Goals
Argentina	2009	3	1
Argentina	2010	10	6
Argentina	2011	9	5
Argentina	2012	8	4
Argentina	2013	5	4
Argentina	2014	11	3
Argentina	2015	8	2
Argentina	2016	13	6
Argentina	2017	2	0
Argentina	2018	6	0
Total		75	31

Scores and results list Argentina's goal tally first, score column indicates score after each Higuaín goal.

List of international goals scored by Gonzalo Higuaín
No.	Date	Venue	Opponent	Score	Result	Competition
1	10 October 2009	Estadio Monumental Antonio Vespucio Liberti, Buenos Aires, Argentina	Peru	1–0	2–1	2010 FIFA World Cup qualification
2	3 March 2010	Allianz Arena, Munich, Germany	Germany	1–0	1–0	Friendly
3	17 June 2010	FNB Stadium, Johannesburg, South Africa	South Korea	2–0	4–1	2010 FIFA World Cup
4	17 June 2010	FNB Stadium, Johannesburg, South Africa	South Korea	3–1	4–1	2010 FIFA World Cup
5	17 June 2010	FNB Stadium, Johannesburg, South Africa	South Korea	4–1	4–1	2010 FIFA World Cup
6	27 June 2010	FNB Stadium, Johannesburg, South Africa	Mexico	2–0	3–1	2010 FIFA World Cup
7	7 September 2010	Estadio Monumental Antonio Vespucio Liberti, Buenos Aires, Argentina	Spain	2–0	4–1	Friendly
8	16 July 2011	Estadio Brigadier General Estanislao López, Santa Fe, Argentina	Uruguay	1–1	1–1 (4–5 p)	2011 Copa América
9	6 September 2011	Bangabandhu National Stadium, Dhaka, Bangladesh	Nigeria	1–0	3–1	Friendly
10	7 October 2011	Estadio Monumental Antonio Vespucio Liberti, Buenos Aires, Argentina	Chile	1–0	4–1	2014 FIFA World Cup qualification
11	7 October 2011	Estadio Monumental Antonio Vespucio Liberti, Buenos Aires, Argentina	Chile	3–0	4–1	2014 FIFA World Cup qualification
12	7 October 2011	Estadio Monumental Antonio Vespucio Liberti, Buenos Aires, Argentina	Chile	4–1	4–1	2014 FIFA World Cup qualification
13	2 June 2012	Estadio Monumental Antonio Vespucio Liberti, Buenos Aires, Argentina	Ecuador	2–0	4–0	2014 FIFA World Cup qualification
14	7 September 2012	Estadio Mario Alberto Kempes, Córdoba, Argentina	Paraguay	2–1	3–1	2014 FIFA World Cup qualification
15	11 September 2012	Estadio Nacional, Lima, Peru	Peru	1–1	1–1	2014 FIFA World Cup qualification
16	16 October 2012	Estadio Nacional Julio Martínez Prádanos, Santiago, Chile	Chile	2–0	2–1	2014 FIFA World Cup qualification
17 (Note: Higuaín is sometimes miscredited as having scored the first goal in this game; however, it was officially recorded as an own goal by Sweden's Mikael Lustig.)	6 February 2013	Friends Arena, Solna, Sweden	Sweden	3–1	3–2	Friendly
18	22 March 2013	Estadio Monumental Antonio Vespucio Liberti, Buenos Aires, Argentina	Venezuela	2–0	3–0	2014 FIFA World Cup qualification
19	22 March 2013	Estadio Monumental Antonio Vespucio Liberti, Buenos Aires, Argentina	Venezuela	3–0	3–0	2014 FIFA World Cup qualification
20	14 August 2013	Stadio Olimpico, Rome, Italy	Italy	1–0	2–1	Friendly
21	5 July 2014	Estádio Nacional Mané Garrincha, Brasília, Brazil	Belgium	1–0	1–0	2014 FIFA World Cup
22	14 October 2014	Hong Kong Stadium, Wan Chai, Hong Kong	Hong Kong	2–0	7–0	Friendly
23	14 October 2014	Hong Kong Stadium, Wan Chai, Hong Kong	Hong Kong	4–0	7–0	Friendly
24	20 June 2015	Estadio Sausalito, Viña del Mar, Chile	Jamaica	1–0	1–0	2015 Copa América
25	30 June 2015	Estadio Municipal de Concepción, Concepción, Chile	Paraguay	6–1	6–1	2015 Copa América
26	28 May 2016	Estadio San Juan del Bicentenario, San Juan, Argentina	Honduras	1–0	1–0	Friendly
27	18 June 2016	Gillette Stadium, Foxborough, United States	Venezuela	1–0	4–1	Copa América Centenario
28	18 June 2016	Gillette Stadium, Foxborough, United States	Venezuela	2–0	4–1	Copa América Centenario
29	21 June 2016	NRG Stadium, Houston, United States	United States	3–0	4–0	Copa América Centenario
30	21 June 2016	NRG Stadium, Houston, United States	United States	4–0	4–0	Copa América Centenario
31	6 October 2016	Estadio Nacional, Lima, Peru	Peru	2–1	2–2	2018 FIFA World Cup qualification

== Honours ==
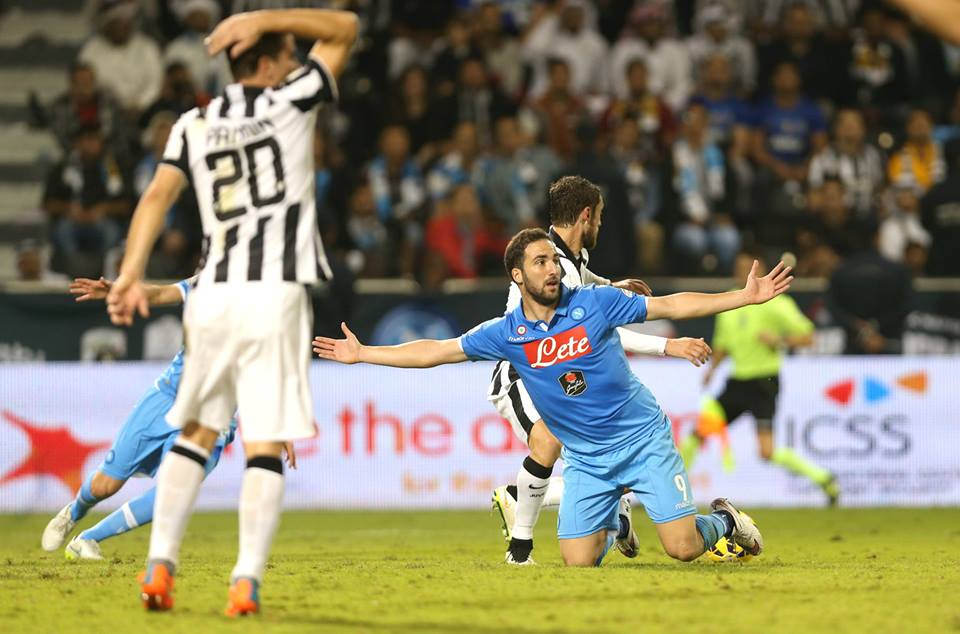
Higuaín (wearing blue) playing for Napoli against future club Juventus in the 2014 Supercoppa Italiana: Higuaín would score both Napoli goals in normal time and also convert in the penalty shoot-out, which Napoli won.

Real Madrid

- La Liga: 2006–07, 2007–08, 2011–12
- Copa del Rey: 2010–11
- Supercopa de España: 2008, 2012

Napoli

- Coppa Italia: 2013–14
- Supercoppa Italiana: 2014

Juventus

- Serie A: 2016–17, 2017–18, 2019–20
- Coppa Italia: 2016–17, 2017–18
- UEFA Champions League runner-up: 2016–17

Chelsea

- UEFA Europa League: 2018–19
- EFL Cup runner-up: 2018–19

Argentina

- FIFA World Cup runner-up: 2014
- Copa América runner-up: 2015, 2016

Individual

- Serie A top scorer: 2015–16
- Serie A Team of the Year: 2013–14, 2015–16, 2016–17
- UEFA Europa League Squad of the season: 2013–14, 2014–15
- ESM Team of the Year: 2015–16
- Forward of the "Ideal Team of America": 2006
- FIFA FIFPro World XI 4th team: 2016
- Juventus MVP of the Year: 2016–17, 2017–18
- MLS Comeback Player of the Year: 2022

== See also ==
- List of FIFA World Cup top goalscorers
