= Jorge Higuaín =

Argentine footballer (born 1957)

Personal information
- Full name: Jorge Nicolás Higuaín
- Date of birth: 8 June 1957 (age 69)
- Place of birth: Buenos Aires, Argentina
- Position: Defender

Senior career*
| Years | Team | Apps | (Gls) |
| 1976–1980 | Nueva Chicago | 110 | (5) |
| 1981–1982 | Gimnasia La Plata | 78 | (4) |
| 1982–1985 | San Lorenzo | 97 | (9) |
| 1985–1986 | Boca Juniors | 59 | (5) |
| 1986–1988 | Brest | 33 | (1) |
| 1988–1990 | River Plate | 131 | (5) |
| 1990–1991 | Banfield | 2 | (2) |
| Total | | 477 | (30) |
- * Club domestic league appearances and goals as of July 2007

Jorge Nicolás Higuaín (born 8 June 1957) is an Argentine former footballer who played as a central defender. During his playing career, he played for Boca Juniors, River Plate, San Lorenzo and Stade Brestois 29, the latter of which was at French top division.

== Personal life ==
Higuaín is married to Nancy Zacarías, an artist with whom he has four sons, Nicolás, Federico, Gonzalo, and Lautaro. His two middle sons followed in their father's footsteps as professional footballers and began their careers at River Plate.
