= Capi (footballer, born 1979) =

Spanish footballer

Personal information
- Full name: Jesús Tablado Feito
- Date of birth: 26 September 1979 (age 47)
- Place of birth: Mieres, Spain
- Height: 1.70 m (5 ft 7 in)
- Position: Forward

Senior career*
Years	Team	Apps	(Gls)
1998–2000	Oviedo B	69	(11)
2000–2001	Caudal	33	(12)
2001–2003	Pontevedra	51	(8)
2003–2004	Astur	37	(23)
2004–2006	Palencia	62	(16)
2006–2009	Alicante	88	(16)
2009–2010	Zamora	11	(1)
Total		351	(87)
- * Club domestic league appearances and goals

Jesús Tablado Feito (born 26 September 1979 in Mieres, Asturias), known as Capi, is a Spanish former professional footballer who played as a forward.
