= 2003–04 Real Madrid CF season =

Spanish football club season

Real Madrid
2003–04 season
- President: Florentino Pérez
- Head coach: Carlos Queiroz
- Stadium: Santiago Bernabéu
- La Liga: 4th
- Copa del Rey: Runners-up
- Supercopa de España: Winners
- UEFA Champions League: Quarter-finals
- Top goalscorer: League: Ronaldo (24); All: Ronaldo (31)
Home colours	Away colours	Third colours

The 2003–04 season was Real Madrid CF's 73rd season in La Liga. This article lists all matches that the club played in the 2003–04 season, and also shows statistics of the club's players. The club played the season wearing their classic white home and teal blue away kits.

== Season summary ==
In spite of the arduous pre-season, the team got off to a good start. They won the Supercopa de España against Mallorca with a 3–0 victory on 27 August in the second leg, avenging their loss to the same side in the 2002–03 Copa del Rey. By the time half of the season had passed, Madrid topped the league table and was still in contention for the Copa del Rey and Champions League trophies. However, the team was eliminated in the quarter-finals of the Champions League on away goals by Monaco and finished as runners-up in the domestic cup, losing to Zaragoza after extra time. They also lost their final five La Liga matches and finished in fourth place, which gave Valencia the title. It was the last time that Real Madrid finished below second place until the 2013–14 season, which brought a long-awaited La Décima.

Competition	Record								Result	Top scorer
Competition	G	W	D	L	GF	GA	GD	Win %	Result	Top scorer
La Liga	38	21	7	10	72	54	+18	55.26	4th	(Brazil) Ronaldo, 24
Copa del Rey	9	6	1	2	19	9	+10	66.67	Runners-up	(Spain) Raúl, 6
Supercopa de España	2	1	0	1	4	2	+2	50.00	Winners	4 players, 1
UEFA Champions League	10	6	3	1	18	11	+7	60.00	Quarter-finals	(Brazil) Ronaldo, 4
Total	59	34	11	14	113	76	+37	57.63		(Brazil) Ronaldo, 31

== Squad ==
Note: Flags indicate national team as defined under FIFA eligibility rules; some limited exceptions apply. Players may hold more than one non-FIFA nationality.

No.	Pos.	Nation	Player
1	GK	ESP	Iker Casillas
2	DF	ESP	Míchel Salgado
3	DF	BRA	Roberto Carlos
5	MF	FRA	Zinedine Zidane
6	DF	ESP	Iván Helguera
7	FW	ESP	Raúl (captain)
8	MF	ESP	Borja
9	FW	BRA	Ronaldo
10	MF	POR	Luís Figo
11	FW	ESP	Javier Portillo
13	GK	ESP	Carlos Sánchez
14	MF	ESP	Guti (vice-captain)
15	DF	ESP	Raúl Bravo
16	MF	ESP	Antonio Núñez
17	DF	ESP	Oscar Miñambres
19	MF	ARG	Esteban Cambiasso

No.	Pos.	Nation	Player
21	MF	ARG	Santiago Solari
22	DF	ESP	Francisco Pavón
23	MF	ENG	David Beckham
25	GK	ESP	César
31	MF	ESP	Jordi López
33	MF	ESP	Álvaro Mejía
34	DF	ESP	Juanfran
35	MF	ESP	José Manuel Jurado
—			
37	MF	ESP	Álex Pérez
38	DF	ESP	Enrique Corrales
39	DF	ESP	Álvaro Arbeloa
40	DF	ESP	Miguel Palencia
41	DF	ESP	Javier Paredes
42	GK	ESP	Diego López

=== Transfers ===
In
Pos.	Name	from	Type
MF	David Beckham	Manchester United	€35 million

Out
Pos.	Name	To	Type
DF	Fernando Hierro	Al-Rayyan SC	end-of-contract
MF	Claude Makélélé	Chelsea F.C.	€16 Million
MF	Steve McManaman	Manchester City	end-of-contract
MF	Flávio Conceição	Borussia Dortmund	loan
MF	Albert Celades	Girondins Bordeaux	loan
FW	Tote	Real Betis	

==== Winter ====
In
Pos.	Name	from	Type

Out
Pos.	Name	To	Type
FW	Fernando Morientes	AS Monaco	loan

== Pre-season ==
The team embarked on a summer tour in Asia, for 18 days, to cash in on the worldwide appeal of their new signing, David Beckham. It included exhibition matches in Beijing, Tokyo, Hong Kong and Bangkok, which alone earned the club €10 million. This was compared by popular contrary with the tour with the first visit of The Beatles to the United States in 1964. Although lucrative and generating wide publicity, the preparation value of the Asia was questionable, considering that the long 2003–04 season which lay ahead. It was exhausting for the players, due to endless rounds of publicity engagements and restrictions on the players' freedom of movement (due to the team hotel being besieged by fans). Most players admitted that they would have preferred a low-profile training camp and/or to have been home in Spain for the pre-season, instead of playing meaningless show matches against low quality opponents. The Asia tour has been said to have catered more to the needs of the club's marketing than to its players' preparations.

=== Pre-season ===
Win Draw Loss

2 August 2003	Dragon Team XI	0–4	Real Madrid	Beijing, People's Republic of China
		Report	Figo 43'; Morientes 74', 86'; Portillo 89'	Stadium: Workers Stadium; Attendance: 50, 000

5 August 2003	FC Tokyo	0–3	Real Madrid	Tokyo, Japan
		Report	(yellow card) 8', (goal) 38' Beckham; 45' Solari; 89' Ronaldo	Stadium: Olympic Stadium; Attendance: 65, 000

8 August 2003	Hong Kong League XI	2–4	Real Madrid	So Kon Po, Hong Kong
	25' Wang; 45' Li	Report	Figo 6'; Ronaldo 12', 33'; Raúl 34'	Stadium: Hong Kong Stadium; Attendance: 40, 000

10 August 2003	Thailand	1–2	Real Madrid	Bangkok, Thailand
	65' Sutee	Report	Portillo 29'; Morientes 68'	Stadium: Rajamangala Stadium; Attendance: 60, 000

17 August 2003 Trofeo Naranja	Valencia	0–0 (a.e.t.) (5–6 p)	Real Madrid	Valencia, Spain
		(Report)		Stadium: Mestalla Stadium; Attendance: 23, 000; Referee: Rodríguez Santiago
	Penalties
	Oliveira (penalty scored); Canobbio (penalty scored); Carboni (penalty scored); Marchena (penalty scored); Palop (penalty scored); Pellegrino (penalty missed)		(penalty scored) Roberto Carlos; (penalty scored) Morientes; (penalty scored) Guti; (penalty scored) Portillo; (penalty scored) Helguera; (penalty scored) Cambiasso

23 September 2003 Santiago Bernabéu Trophy	Real Madrid	3–1	River Plate	Madrid, Spain
	Solari 55', 58'; Portillo 70'	Report	González 81'	Stadium: Estadio Santiago Bernabéu; Attendance: 40,000; Referee: Eduardo Iturralde González

== Results ==
=== 2003 Supercopa de España ===
24 August 2003 First Leg	Mallorca	2–1	Real Madrid	Palma de Mallorca
21:45 CET	Bruggink 45'; Eto'o 48'	Report	Figo 18'	Stadium: Son Moix; Attendance: 22,000; Referee: Pérez Burrull

27 August 2003 Second Leg	Real Madrid	3–0 (4–2 agg.)	Mallorca	Madrid
21:45 CET	Raúl 44'; Ronaldo 52'; Beckham 73'	Report		Stadium: Santiago Bernabéu; Attendance: 50,000; Referee: Medina Cantalejo

=== La Liga ===
==== Classification ====
Pos	Team	Pld	W	D	L	GF	GA	GD	Pts	Qualification or relegation
2	Barcelona	38	21	9	8	63	39	+24	72	Qualification for the Champions League group stage
3	Deportivo La Coruña	38	21	8	9	60	34	+26	71	Qualification for the Champions League third qualifying round
4	Real Madrid	38	21	7	10	72	54	+18	70	Qualification for the Champions League third qualifying round
5	Athletic Bilbao	38	15	11	12	53	49	+4	56	Qualification for the UEFA Cup first round
6	Sevilla	38	15	10	13	56	45	+11	55 (Note: SEV 2–0 ATM; ATM 2–1 SEV)	Qualification for the UEFA Cup first round

Source: LFP
Rules for classification: 1st points; 2nd head-to-head points; 3rd head-to-head goal difference; 4th head-to-head goals scored; 5th goal difference; 6th number of goals scored; 7th Fair-play points

==== Results by round ====
Round	1	2	3	4	5	6	7	8	9	10	11	12	13	14	15	16	17	18	19	20	21	22	23	24	25	26	27	28	29	30	31	32	33	34	35	36	37	38
Ground	H	A	H	A	A	H	A	H	A	H	A	H	A	H	A	H	A	H	A	A	H	A	H	H	A	H	A	H	A	H	A	H	A	H	A	H	A	H
Result	W	D	W	W	L	W	W	W	D	W	L	W	D	W	W	W	W	W	L	D	W	W	W	D	W	W	D	D	L	W	W	L	W	L	L	L	L	L
Position	2	2	2	2	3	3	3	3	3	2	3	1	2	1	1	1	1	1	2	2	1	1	1	1	1	1	1	1	1	1	1	2	2	2	2	2	3	4

Updated to match(es) played on 2008-07-16. Source: LFP.com
A = Away; H = Home; W = Win; D = Draw; L = Loss; = Leader, 2004-05 UEFA Champions League Group stage; = 2004-05 UEFA Champions League Group stage; = 2004-05 UEFA Champions League Qualifying round; = 2004-05 UEFA Cup; = 2004-05 Segunda Division

==== Matches ====
30 August 2003 1	Real Madrid	2–1	Betis	Madrid
19:30 CEST	Beckham 2'; Ronaldo 61'		Juanito 33'	Stadium: Santiago Bernabeu

2 September 2003 2	Villarreal	1–1	Real Madrid	Villarreal
21:00 CEST	Anderson 71'		Núñez 85'	Stadium: El Madrigal

13 September 2003 3	Real Madrid	7–2	Valladolid	Madrid
19:30 CEST	Júlio César 20' (o.g.); Raúl 32', 34', 75'; Zidane 53'; Figo 59'; Ronaldo 70'		Losada 56'; Chema 60'	Stadium: Santiago Bernabeu

21 September 2003 4	Málaga	1–3	Real Madrid	Málaga
21:30 CEST	Edgar 78'		Ronaldo 12'; Beckham 71'; Guti 85'	Stadium: La Rosaleda

27 September 2003 5	Valencia	2–0	Real Madrid	Valencia
21:30 CEST	Mista 5'; Oliveira 71'			Stadium: Mestalla

5 October 2003 6	Real Madrid	2–1	Espanyol	Madrid
19:00 CEST	Ronaldo 52', 82'		90' Á. Fernández	Stadium: Santiago Bernabeu

18 October 2003 7	Celta Vigo	0–2	Real Madrid	Vigo
19:30 CEST			Ronaldo 24'; Roberto Carlos 65'	Stadium: Balaidos

25 October 2003 8	Real Madrid	3–1	Racing Santander	Madrid
19:30 CEST	Zidane 27'; Raúl 79', 90'		Benayoun 16'	Stadium: Santiago Bernabeu

28 October 2003 9	Real Zaragoza	0–0	Real Madrid	Zaragoza
21:00 CET				Stadium: La Romareda

1 November 2003 10	Real Madrid	3–0	Athletic Bilbao	Madrid
21:30 CET	Ronaldo 33', 55'; Figo 69'			Stadium: Santiago Bernabeu

9 November 2003 11	Sevilla	4–1	Real Madrid	Sevilla
21:00 CET	Helguera 6' (o.g.); Silva 7'; Alves 14'; Casquero 37'		Ronaldo 54'	Stadium: Sanchez Pizjuan

23 November 2003 12	Real Madrid	2–1	Albacete	Madrid
19:00 CET	Beckham 38'; Zidane 81'		Parri 39'	Stadium: Santiago Bernabeu

29 November 2003 13	Osasuna	1–1	Real Madrid	Pamplona
19:30 CET	Bakayoko 10'		Ronaldo 73'	Stadium: El Sadar

3 December 2003 14	Real Madrid	2–0	Atlético Madrid	Madrid
21:30 CET	Ronaldo 1'; Raúl 20'			Stadium: Santiago Bernabeu

6 December 2003 15	Barcelona	1–2	Real Madrid	Barcelona
21:30 CET	Kluivert 83'		Roberto Carlos 37'; Ronaldo 74'	Stadium: Camp Nou

14 December 2003 16	Real Madrid	2–1	Deportivo	Madrid
19:00 CET	Ronaldo 44'; Raúl 84'		62' Pandiani	Stadium: Santiago Bernabeu

21 December 2003 17	Mallorca	1–3	Real Madrid	Palma de Mallorca
19:00 CET	Correa 11'		Raúl 45'; Ronaldo 55'; Figo 69' (pen.)	Stadium: Son Moix

3 January 2004 18	Real Madrid	1–0	Murcia	Madrid
19:30 CET	Raúl 8'			Stadium: Santiago Bernabeu

10 January 2004 19	Real Sociedad	1–0	Real Madrid	San Sebastián
21:30 CET	Karpin 63'			Stadium: Anoeta

18 January 2004 20	Betis	1–1	Real Madrid	Sevilla
21:00 CET	Joaquín 33'		Ronaldo 59'	Stadium: Benito Villamarín

24 January 2004 21	Real Madrid	2–1	Villarreal	Madrid
19:30 CET	Solari 15'; Ronaldo 54'		Ballesteros 86'	Stadium: Santiago Bernabeu

1 February 2004 22	Valladolid	2–3	Real Madrid	Valladolid
17:00 CET	Ó. González 33', 41'		Ronaldo 48', 89'; Figo 62'	Stadium: Jose Zorrilla; Referee: Lizondo Cortés

7 February 2004 23	Real Madrid	2–1	Málaga	Madrid
21:30 CET	Ronaldo 24'; Roberto Carlos 59'		Luque 74'	Stadium: Santiago Bernabeu

15 February 2004 24	Real Madrid	1–1	Valencia	Madrid
21:00 CET	Figo 90' (pen.)		Ayala 74'	Stadium: Santiago Bernabeu

21 February 2004 25	Espanyol	2–4	Real Madrid	Barcelona
19:30 CET	Tamudo 30'; Lopo 85'		Ronaldo 25' (pen.), 69'; Roberto Carlos 52'; Bravo 66'	Stadium: Montjuic

29 February 2004 26	Real Madrid	4–2	Celta Vigo	Madrid
19:00 CET	Ronaldo 54'; Zidane 64', 90'; Figo 71'		Ilić 17'; Milošević 90'	Stadium: Santiago Bernabeu

6 March 2004 27	Racing Santander	1–1	Real Madrid	Santander
19:30 CET	Benayoun 32'		Solari 28'	Stadium: El Sardinero

13 March 2004 28	Real Madrid	1–1	Real Zaragoza	Madrid
19:30 CET	Portillo 27'		Toledo 32'	Stadium: Santiago Bernabeu

20 March 2004 29	Athletic Bilbao	4–2	Real Madrid	Bilbao
19:30 CET	Yeste 40'; Urzaiz 44'; Del Horno 74', 76'		Raúl 46', 71'	Stadium: San Mames

28 March 2004 30	Real Madrid	5–1	Sevilla	Madrid
21:00 CEST	Solari 6'; Ronaldo 45', 90'; Zidane 61'; Salgado 75'		Baptista 59' (pen.)	Stadium: Santiago Bernabeu

3 April 2004 31	Albacete	1–2	Real Madrid	Albacete
20:00 CEST	Parri 82'		Roberto Carlos 19'; Figo 71'	Stadium: Carlos Belmonte

11 April 2004 32	Real Madrid	0–3	Osasuna	Madrid
21:30 CEST			Valdo 2'; P. García 43'; Moha 61'	Stadium: Santiago Bernabeu

17 April 2004 33	Atlético Madrid	1–2	Real Madrid	Madrid
22:00 CEST	Paunović 47'		5' Solari; 77' Helguera	Stadium: Vicente Calderon

25 April 2004 34	Real Madrid	1–2	Barcelona	Madrid
19:30 CEST	Solari 54'		Kluivert 58'; Xavi 86'	Stadium: Santiago Bernabeu

1 May 2004 35	Deportivo	2–0	Real Madrid	La Coruña
22:00 CEST	Tristán 29'; Capdevila 69'			Stadium: Riazor

8 May 2004 36	Real Madrid	2–3	Mallorca	Madrid
22:00 CEST	Pavón 17'; Figo 50' (pen.)		Eto'o 11', 36'; Campano 42'	Stadium: Santiago Bernabeu

16 May 2004 37	Murcia	2–1	Real Madrid	Murcia
21:30 CEST	García 2', 33' (pen.)		Guti 90'	Stadium: La Condomina

23 May 2004 38	Real Madrid	1–4	Real Sociedad	Madrid
21:00 CEST	Figo 39' (pen.)		Kovačević 14'; Prieto 29', 60' (pen.); De Paula 32'	Stadium: Santiago Bernabeu

=== Copa del Rey ===
==== Round of 64 ====
8 October 2003	San Sebastián	0–3	Real Madrid	San Sebastián de los Reyes
			Raúl 28'; Portillo 57'; Cambiasso 87'	Stadium: Nuevo Matapiñonera; Attendance: 4,000; Referee: Rafael Ramírez Domínguez

==== Round of 32 ====
16 December 2003	Leganés	3–4 (a.e.t.)	Real Madrid	Leganés
	Pérez 40', 45'; Pavón 50' (o.g.)		Beckham 14'; Raúl 37', 110'; Solari 88'	Stadium: Estadio Municipal de Butarque; Attendance: 7,000; Referee: Bernardino González Vázquez

==== Round of 16 ====
7 January 2004 First Leg	Eibar	1–1	Real Madrid	Eibar
	Cuevas 45'		Guti 37'	Stadium: Ipurua Municipal Stadium; Referee: Alfonso Pérez Burrull

13 January 2004 Second Leg	Real Madrid	2–0 (3–1 agg.)	Eibar	Madrid
	Ronaldo 59'; Figo 68'			Stadium: Santiago Bernabéu; Attendance: 47,000; Referee: Evaristo Puentes Leira

==== Quarter-finals ====
21 January 2004 First Leg	Real Madrid	3–0	Valencia	Madrid
	Raúl 31'; Ronaldo 81'; Figo 86' (pen.)			Stadium: Santiago Bernabéu; Attendance: 65,000; Referee: Luis Medina Cantalejo

28 January 2004 Second Leg	Valencia	1–2 (1–5 agg.)	Real Madrid	Valencia
	Xisco 73'		Raúl 14'; Zidane 90'	Stadium: Mestalla; Attendance: 42,000; Referee: Fernando Carmona Méndez

==== Semi-finals ====
4 February 2004 First Leg	Real Madrid	2–0	Sevilla	Madrid
	Solari 56'; Raúl 76'			Stadium: Santiago Bernabéu; Referee: Javier Turienzo Álvarez

11 February 2004 Second Leg	Sevilla	1–0 (1–2 agg.)	Real Madrid	Seville
	López 1'			Stadium: Ramón Sánchez Pizjuán; Attendance: 45,000; Referee: Eduardo Iturralde González

==== Final ====
17 March 2004 Final	Real Madrid	2–3 (a.e.t.)	Real Zaragoza	Barcelona
	Beckham 23'; Roberto Carlos 47'		Dani 28'; Villa 44' (pen.); Galletti 111'	Stadium: Estadi Olímpic Lluís Companys; Attendance: 54,000; Referee: Fernando Carmona Méndez

=== UEFA Champions League ===
==== Group stage ====
Pos	Team	Pld	W	D	L	GF	GA	GD	Pts	Qualification	RMA	POR	MAR	PTZ
1	(Spain) Real Madrid	6	4	2	0	11	5	+6	14	Advance to knockout stage	—	1–1	4–2	1–0
2	(Portugal) Porto	6	3	2	1	9	8	+1	11	Advance to knockout stage	1–3	—	1–0	2–1
3	(France) Marseille	6	1	1	4	9	11	−2	4	Transfer to UEFA Cup	1–2	2–3	—	3–0
4	(Serbia and Montenegro) Partizan	6	0	3	3	3	8	−5	3		0–0	1–1	1–1	—

Source: RSSSF

16 September 2003 1	Real Madrid (Spain)	4–2	(France) Marseille	Madrid, Spain
20:45 (20:45 UTC+2)	Roberto Carlos 29'; Ronaldo 34', 57'; Figo 61' (pen.)	Report	Drogba 26'; Van Buyten 83'	Stadium: Santiago Bernabéu Stadium; Attendance: 70,000; Referee: Wolfgang Stark (Germany)

1 October 2003 2	Porto (Portugal)	1–3	(Spain) Real Madrid	Porto, Portugal
20:45 (19:45 UTC+1)	Costinha 7'	Report	Helguera 28'; Solari 37'; Zidane 67'	Stadium: Estádio das Antas; Attendance: 37,500; Referee: Pierluigi Collina (Italy)

22 October 2003 3	Real Madrid (Spain)	1–0	(Serbia and Montenegro) Partizan	Madrid, Spain
20:45 (20:45 UTC+2)	Raúl 38'	Report		Stadium: Santiago Bernabéu Stadium; Attendance: 58,000; Referee: Massimo Busacca (Switzerland)

4 November 2003 4	Partizan (Serbia and Montenegro)	0–0	(Spain) Real Madrid	Belgrade, Serbia
20:45 (20:45 UTC+1)		Report		Stadium: Partizan Stadium; Attendance: 32,000; Referee: Cosimo Bolognino (Italy)

26 November 2003 5	Marseille (France)	1–2	(Spain) Real Madrid	Marseille, France
20:45 (20:45 UTC+1)	Mido 63'	Report	Beckham 35'; Ronaldo 73'	Stadium: Stade Vélodrome; Attendance: 59,000; Referee: Anders Frisk (Sweden)

9 December 2003 6	Real Madrid (Spain)	1–1	(Portugal) Porto	Madrid, Spain
20:45 (20:45 UTC+1)	Solari 9'	Report	Derlei 35' (pen.)	Stadium: Santiago Bernabéu Stadium; Attendance: 28,000; Referee: Steve Bennett (England)

==== Round of 16 ====
24 February 2004 Round of 16, First Leg	Bayern Munich (Germany)	1–1	(Spain) Real Madrid	Munich, Germany
20:45 (20:45 UTC+1)	Makaay 75'	Report	Roberto Carlos 83'	Stadium: Olympic Stadium; Attendance: 59,000; Referee: Terje Hauge (Norway)

10 March 2004 Round of 16, Second Leg	Real Madrid (Spain)	1–0 (2–1 agg.)	(Germany) Bayern Munich	Madrid, Spain
20:45 (20:45 UTC+1)	Zidane 32'	Report		Stadium: Santiago Bernabéu; Attendance: 78,000; Referee: Urs Meier (Switzerland)

==== Quarter-finals ====
24 March 2004 Quarter-finals, First Leg	Real Madrid (Spain)	4–2	(France) Monaco	Madrid, Spain
20:45 (20:45 UTC+1)	Helguera 51'; Zidane 70'; Figo 77'; Ronaldo 81'	Report	Squillaci 43'; Morientes 83'	Stadium: Santiago Bernabéu; Attendance: 70,000; Referee: Ľuboš Micheľ (Slovakia)

6 April 2004 Quarter-finals, Second Leg	Monaco (France)	3–1 (5a-5 agg.)	(Spain) Real Madrid	Monaco
20:45 (20:45 UTC+2)	Giuly 45+1', 66'; Morientes 48'	Report	Raúl 36'	Stadium: Stade Louis II; Attendance: 18,500; Referee: Pierluigi Collina (Italy)

== Statistics ==
=== Players statistics ===
No.	Pos	Nat	Player	Total		La Liga		Copa del Rey		Champions League	
No.	Pos	Nat	Player	Apps	Goals	Apps	Goals	Apps	Goals	Apps	Goals
1	GK	(Spain) ESP	Casillas	48	-61	37	-50	2	-1	9	-10
2	DF	(Spain) ESP	Salgado	52	1	35	1	6+1	0	10	0
6	DF	(Spain) ESP	Helguera	43	3	28+1	1	6	0	8	2
15	DF	(Spain) ESP	Bravo	51	1	32	1	8+1	0	9+1	0
22	DF	(Spain) ESP	Pavon	38	1	26+3	1	2+1	0	5+1	0
3	DF	(Brazil) BRA	Roberto Carlos	47	8	32	5	7	1	8	2
10	MF	(Portugal) POR	Figo	52	13	34+2	9	6	2	10	2
23	MF	(England) ENG	Beckham	44	6	32	3	5	2	7	1
5	MF	(France) FRA	Zidane	48	10	33	6	4+1	1	10	3
7	FW	(Spain) ESP	Raúl	51	19	35	11	7	6	8+1	2
9	FW	(Brazil) BRA	Ronaldo	46	30	31+1	24	4+1	2	9	4
25	GK	(Spain) ESP	César	9	-13	1	-4	7	-8	1	-1
14	MF	(Spain) ESP	Guti	43	3	16+10	2	8	1	5+4	0
21	MF	(Argentina) ARG	Solari	52	9	15+19	5	8+1	2	3+6	2
19	MF	(Argentina) ARG	Cambiasso	26	1	9+8	0	3+1	1	3+2	0
33	DF	(Spain) ESP	Mejía	14	0	8+1	0	2	0	3	0
8	MF	(Spain) ESP	Borja	24	0	6+9	0	3+2	0	2+2	0
11	FW	(Spain) ESP	Portillo	29	2	3+15	1	3+4	1	0+4	0
34	DF	(Spain) ESP	Juanfran	8	0	2+3	0	1+2	0		
4	DF	(Spain) ESP	Rubén	5	0	2	0	2	0	0+1	0
31	MF	(Spain) ESP	J. López	5	0	1+1	0	0+2	0	0+1	0
16	MF	(Spain) ESP	Núñez	15	1	0+11	1	2+2	0		
9	FW	(Spain) ESP	Morientes	1	0	0+1	0	0	0	0	0
17	DF	(Spain) ESP	Miñambres	3	0	0+1	0	1	0	0+1	0
28	DF	(Spain) ESP	Olalla	1	0	0	0	1	0		
41	DF	(Spain) ESP	Paredes	1	0	0	0	1	0	0	0
29	DF	(Spain) ESP	Riki	1	0	0	0	0+1	0		
24	MF	(France) FRA	Makélélé	0	0	0	0	0	0	0	0
13	GK	(Spain) ESP	Sánchez	0	0	0	0	0	0	0	0
35	MF	(Spain) ESP	Jurado	0	0	0	0	0	0	0	0
36	MF	(Spain) ESP	Soldado	0	0	0	0	0	0	0	0
37	MF	(Spain) ESP	Pérez	0	0	0	0	0	0	0	0
38	DF	(Spain) ESP	Corrales	0	0	0	0	0	0	0	0
39	DF	(Spain) ESP	Arbeloa	0	0	0	0	0	0	0	0
40	DF	(Spain) ESP	Palencia	0	0	0	0	0	0	0	0
42	GK	(Spain) ESP	D. López	0	0	0	0	0	0	0	0

- Source: https://www.bdfutbol.com/en/t/t2003-042.html
