= 2002–03 Real Madrid CF season =

101st season in existence of Real Madrid CF

Real Madrid
2002–03 season
- President: Florentino Pérez
- Head coach: Vicente del Bosque
- Stadium: Santiago Bernabéu
- La Liga: 1st
- Copa del Rey: Quarter-finals
- UEFA Champions League: Semi-finals
- UEFA Super Cup: Winners
- Intercontinental Cup: Winners
- Top goalscorer: League: Ronaldo (23); All: Ronaldo (30)
Home colours	Away colours	Third colours

The 2002–03 season was Real Madrid's 72nd season in La Liga. This article lists all matches that the club played in the 2002–03 season, and also shows statistics of the club's players. This season marked the return of their purple away kits, and a new shirt sponsor, Siemens Mobile.

Real Madrid returned to domestic league glory under Vicente del Bosque after a 3–1 victory against Athletic Bilbao in the last game of the season, but the club surprisingly sacked del Bosque shortly after winning the La Liga title after he had not been offered a new contract. He was replaced by a surprise candidate Carlos Queiroz. Madrid were also on course to retain their Champions League title (as well as winning La Decima) before being eliminated by Juventus in the semi-finals. In the domestic cup, the club was eliminated by eventual champions Mallorca with a 1–5 aggregate loss.

== Squad ==
Note: Flags indicate national team as defined under FIFA eligibility rules; some limited exceptions apply. Players may hold more than one non-FIFA nationality.

No.	Pos.	Nation	Player
1	GK	ESP	Iker Casillas
2	DF	ESP	Míchel Salgado
3	DF	BRA	Roberto Carlos
4	DF	ESP	Fernando Hierro (Captain)
5	MF	FRA	Zinedine Zidane
6	DF	ESP	Iván Helguera
7	FW	ESP	Raúl (Vice-captain)
8	MF	ENG	Steve McManaman
9	FW	ESP	Fernando Morientes
10	MF	POR	Luís Figo
11	FW	BRA	Ronaldo
12	FW	ESP	Tote
13	GK	ESP	César
14	MF	ESP	Guti
16	MF	BRA	Flávio Conceição
17	DF	ESP	Óscar Miñambres
18	FW	ESP	Javier Portillo
19	DF	ARG	Esteban Cambiasso

No.	Pos.	Nation	Player
20	MF	ESP	Albert Celades
21	MF	ARG	Santiago Solari
22	DF	ESP	Francisco Pavón
24	MF	FRA	Claude Makélélé
26	GK	ESP	Carlos Sánchez
28	MF	ESP	José Cabrera
29	DF	ESP	Rubén
30	GK	ESP	Jordi Codina
31	DF	ESP	Enrique Corrales
32	DF	ESP	Borja
33	FW	ESP	Luis García
35	DF	ESP	Angelo
36	DF	ESP	Juan Carlos Duque
37	DF	ESP	Juanjo Olalla
38	MF	ESP	Álex Pérez
39	DF	ESP	César Navas

=== Transfers ===
In
Pos.	Name	from	Type
FW	Ronaldo	Internazionale	€45,0 million
FW	Tote	Real Valladolid	loan ended
MF	Esteban Cambiasso	River Plate	

Out
Pos.	Name	To	Type
FW	Pedro Munitis	Racing Santander	
DF	Aitor Karanka	Athletic Bilbao	
MF	Sávio	Bordeaux	
DF	Ivan Campo	Bolton Wanderers	
FW	Edwin Congo	Levante	

==== Winter ====
In
Pos.	Name	from	Type

Out
Pos.	Name	To	Type
DF	Raúl Bravo	Leeds United	loan
MF	Valdo	Osasuna	loan

== Centennial kit ==
The club wore a special kit through the 2002 year.

Centennial

== Pre-season and friendlies ==
26 July 2002 Friendly	Obersteirische FV	0–10	Real Madrid	Irdning, Austria
			Sávio 10', 17'; Pavón 15'; Tote 43'; Guti 49', 64'; Congo 54'; Celades 57'; Fernando 72'; Portillo 87'	Stadium: ATV Arena

28 July 2002 Friendly	Grazer AK	3–2	Real Madrid	Graz, Austria
	Brunmayr 13', 42'; Kollmann 52'		McManaman 72'; Sávio 79'	Stadium: Arnold Schwarzenegger-Stadium

2 August 2002 Trofeo Santiago Bernabéu	Real Madrid	2–0	Liverpool	Madrid, Spain
	Figo 39'; Portillo 59'			Stadium: Santiago Bernabéu

4 August 2002 Trofeo Santiago Bernabéu	Real Madrid	1–2	Bayern Munich	Madrid, Spain
	Figo 82' (pen.)		Ballack 27' (pen.); Salihamidžić 64'	Stadium: Santiago Bernabéu

8 August 2002 Friendly	Real Madrid	0–0	Roma	East Rutherford, United States
				Stadium: Giants Stadium

15 August 2002 Bahía de Cartagena Trophy	Real Betis	2–0	Real Madrid	Cartagena, Spain
	Assunção 19'; Alfonso 50' (pen.)			Stadium: Estadio Cartagonova

17 August 2002 Friendly	Benfica	2–3	Real Madrid	Lisbon, Portugal
19:30 CET (UTC+01)	Zahovič 6'; Argel 45'	Report	Figo 11'; Miñambres 60'; Portillo 81'	Stadium: Estádio da Luz; Referee: Vítor Pereira

24 August 2002 Trofeo Ciudad de Alicante	Real Madrid	5–2	Dinamo București	Alicante, Spain
	Raúl 33'; Hierro 55' (pen.); Portillo 72', 78'; Sávio 88' (pen.)	Report	Grigorie 12'; Niculescu 59'	Stadium: José Rico Pérez

18 December 2002 Friendly	Real Madrid	3–3	FIFA All-Stars	Madrid, Spain
	Solari 60' (pen.); Tote 65'; Cambiasso 86'	Report	Klose 30'; Kaká 42'; Cissé 48'	Stadium: Santiago Bernabéu; Attendance: 55,000; Referee: Manuel Mejuto González

== Competitions ==
=== La Liga ===
==== League table ====
Pos	Team	Pld	W	D	L	GF	GA	GD	Pts	Qualification or relegation
1	Real Madrid (C)	38	22	12	4	86	42	+44	78	Qualification for the Champions League group stage
2	Real Sociedad	38	22	10	6	71	45	+26	76	Qualification for the Champions League group stage
3	Deportivo La Coruña	38	22	6	10	67	47	+20	72	Qualification for the Champions League third qualifying round
4	Celta Vigo	38	17	10	11	45	36	+9	61	Qualification for the Champions League third qualifying round
5	Valencia	38	17	9	12	56	35	+21	60	Qualification for the UEFA Cup first round

Source: LFP
Rules for classification: 1st points; 2nd head-to-head points; 3rd head-to-head goal difference; 4th head-to-head away goals scored; 5th goal difference; 6th number of goals scored; 7th Fair-play points
(C) Champions

==== Results by round ====
Round	1	2	3	4	5	6	7	8	9	10	11	12	13	14	15	16	17	18	19	20	21	22	23	24	25	26	27	28	29	30	31	32	33	34	35	36	37	38
Ground	H	A	H	A	H	A	H	A	A	H	A	H	A	H	A	H	A	H	A	A	H	A	H	A	H	A	H	H	A	H	A	H	A	H	A	H	A	H
Result	W	W	D	W	D	L	D	D	W	D	D	W	W	W	W	W	W	D	D	D	W	L	W	W	W	W	W	W	L	D	W	L	D	W	W	D	W	W
Position	3	7	2	6	3	5	4	6	5	5	4	4	3	3	2	2	2	2	2	2	2	2	2	1	1	1	1	1	1	1	1	1	3	2	2	2	1	1

Updated to match(es) played on 2008-07-16. Source: LFP.com
A = Away; H = Home; W = Win; D = Draw; L = Loss; = Leader, 2003-04 UEFA Champions League Group stage; = 2003-04 UEFA Champions League Group stage; = 2003-04 UEFA Champions League Qualifying round; = 2003-04 UEFA Cup; = 2003-04 Segunda Division

==== Matches ====
2 September 2002 1	Real Madrid	2–0	Espanyol	Madrid
21:30 CEST	Helguera 35'; McManaman 89'			Stadium: Santiago Bernabéu

21 September 2002 3	Real Madrid	4–1	Osasuna	Madrid
20:30 CEST	Helguera 10', 77'; Guti 49'; Raúl 51'		Rivero 57'	Stadium: Santiago Bernabéu; Referee: J. Téllez Sanchéz

28 September 2002 4	Valladolid	1–1	Real Madrid	Valladolid
21:30 CEST	Olivera 58'		Raúl 44'	Stadium: José Zorrilla; Attendance: 23,000

6 October 2002 5	Real Madrid	5–2	Alavés	Madrid
18:00 CEST	Zidane 1'; Figo 31', 72'; Ronaldo 65', 78'		Magno 36'; Alonso 86'	Stadium: Santiago Bernabéu

8 October 2002 2	Real Betis	1–1	Real Madrid	Seville
20:30 CEST	Capi 37'		Raúl 50'	Stadium: Manuel Ruiz de Lopera
Note: Rescheduled due to floodlights failure.

19 October 2002 6	Racing Santander	2–0	Real Madrid	Santander
20:30 CEST	Regueiro 40'; Munitis 50'			Stadium: El Sardinero

26 October 2002 7	Real Madrid	1–1	Villarreal	Madrid
20:00 CEST	Zidane 22'		López Vallejo 45' (pen.)	Stadium: Santiago Bernabéu

2 November 2002 8	Deportivo	0–0	Real Madrid	A Coruña
21:30 CET				Stadium: Riazor; Attendance: 30,000

9 November 2002 9	Rayo Vallecano	2–3	Real Madrid	Madrid
20:00 CET	Azkoitia 28'; J. Álvarez 75' (pen.)		Ronaldo 16'; Roberto Carlos 59'; Figo 90'	Stadium: Teresa Rivero; Attendance: 14,000

17 November 2002 10	Real Madrid	0–0	Real Sociedad	Madrid
19:00 CET				Stadium: Santiago Bernabéu

23 November 2002 11	Barcelona	0–0	Real Madrid
21:00 CET

8 December 2002 13	Mallorca	1–5	Real Madrid	Palma de Mallorca
19:00 CET	Eto'o 17'		Ronaldo 6', 47'; Raúl 62', 65'; Guti 90'	Stadium: Son Moix; Attendance: 21,000

15 December 2002 14	Real Madrid	4–2	Recreativo	Madrid
18:30 CET	Raúl Bravo 28'; Helguera 65'; Raúl 70'; Figo 90' (pen.)		Cubillo 3'; Espinola 14'	Stadium: Santiago Bernabéu

21 December 2002 15	Málaga	2–3	Real Madrid
20:00 CET	Musampa 17'; Dely Valdés 40'		Zidane 47'; Raúl 73'; Figo 79' (pen.)

2 January 2003 12	Real Madrid	3–0	Sevilla	Madrid
21:00 CET	Raúl 9'; Conceição 28'; Zidane 73'			Stadium: Santiago Bernabéu; Attendance: 69,000
Note: Rescheduled due to Real Madrid's participation in the 2002 Intercontinental Cup.

5 January 2003 16	Real Madrid	4–1	Valencia	Madrid
20:30 CET	Ronaldo 36'; Zidane 68'; Guti 86'; Portillo 90'		Ayala 54'	Stadium: Santiago Bernabéu; Attendance: 70,000

11 January 2003 17	Celta Vigo	0–1	Real Madrid
21:00 CET			Ronaldo 6'

19 January 2003 18	Real Madrid	2–2	Atlético Madrid	Madrid
20:30 CET	Figo 33', 44' (pen.)		Moreno 11' (pen.); Albertini 90'	Stadium: Santiago Bernabéu

26 January 2003 19	Athletic Bilbao	1–1	Real Madrid
19:00 CET	Del Horno 71'		Ronaldo 57'

2 February 2003 20	Espanyol	2–2	Real Madrid
19:00 CET	Roger 40'; Tamudo 45'		Roberto Carlos 59'; Figo 64'

8 February 2003 21	Real Madrid	4–1	Real Betis	Madrid
21:30 CET	Raúl 43'; Figo 48'; Zidane 60'; Ronaldo 87'		Fernando 37'	Stadium: Santiago Bernabéu

16 February 2003 22	Osasuna	1–0	Real Madrid	Pamplona
17:00 CET	Manfredini 38'			Stadium: El Sadar; Attendance: 18,000

22 February 2003 23	Real Madrid	3–1	Valladolid	Madrid
19:00 CET	Roberto Carlos 18'; Ronaldo 21'; Portillo 89'		Sales 9'	Stadium: Santiago Bernabéu

1 March 2003 24	Alavés	1–5	Real Madrid
21:30 CET	Alonso 75'		Ronaldo 12', 65', 77'; Raúl 35', 81'

8 March 2003 25	Real Madrid	4–1	Racing Santander	Madrid
19:00 CET	Figo 12' (pen.); Zidane 42'; Portillo 76'; Guti 87'		Nafti 47'	Stadium: Santiago Bernabéu

15 March 2003 26	Villarreal	0–1	Real Madrid
19:00 CET			Helguera 89'

23 March 2003 27	Real Madrid	2–0	Deportivo	Madrid
20:30 CET	Zidane 44'; Ronaldo 50'			Stadium: Santiago Bernabéu

5 April 2003 28	Real Madrid	3–1	Rayo Vallecano	Madrid
19:00 CEST	Morientes 85', 90'; Portillo 90'		Cembranos 8'	Stadium: Santiago Bernabéu

13 April 2003 29	Real Sociedad	4–2	Real Madrid
19:00 CEST	Kovačević 2', 19'; Kahveci 31'; Alonso 34'		Ronaldo 32'; Portillo 84'

19 April 2003 30	Real Madrid	1–1	Barcelona	Madrid
21:30 CEST	Ronaldo 16'		Luis Enrique 31'	Stadium: Santiago Bernabéu; Attendance: 80,000

27 April 2003 31	Sevilla	1–3	Real Madrid
19:00 CEST	Gallardo 39'		Helguera 24'; Zidane 53'; Morientes 87'

3 May 2003 32	Real Madrid	1–5	Mallorca	Madrid
19:30 CEST	Ronaldo 9'		Pandiani 47'; Riera 52'; Eto'o 62'; Roberto Carlos 68' (o.g.); Carlitos 76'	Stadium: Santiago Bernabéu

10 May 2003 33	Recreativo	0–0	Real Madrid	Huelva
19:00 CEST				Stadium: Nuevo Colombino; Attendance: 20,000

18 May 2003 34	Real Madrid	5–1	Málaga	Madrid
19:30 CEST	Morientes 5', 49'; Raúl 15', 82'; Roberto Carlos 19'		García (yellow card) 37'; Iznata (yellow card) 45'; Manu 62'; Sánchez (yellow card) 66' znata	Stadium: Santiago Bernabéu; Attendance: 70,000

24 May 2003 35	Valencia	1–2	Real Madrid	Valencia
21:30 CEST	Marchena (yellow card) 41'; Aurélio 62'; Ayala (yellow card) 79'		Ronaldo 26', 64'; Guti (yellow card) 62'	Stadium: Mestalla; Attendance: 53,500

31 May 2003 36	Real Madrid	1–1	Celta Vigo	Madrid
21:30 CEST	Roberto Carlos (yellow card) 32'; Hierro (yellow card) 40'; Raúl 68'		Cáceres (yellow card) 12'; Mostovoi 36'; Cavallero (yellow card) 43'; Ángel (yellow card) 71'; Juanfran (yellow card) 76'; Vágner (yellow card) 90'	Stadium: Santiago Bernabéu; Attendance: 65,000

15 June 2003 37	Atlético Madrid	0–4	Real Madrid	Madrid
21:00 CEST	Coloccini (yellow card) 18'; Sergi (yellow card) 34'		Ronaldo 6', 31'; Raúl 18', 70'	Stadium: Vicente Calderón; Attendance: 57,000

22 June 2003 38	Real Madrid	3–1	Athletic Bilbao	Madrid
21:00 CEST	Ronaldo 9', 61'; Hierro (yellow card) 43'; Roberto Carlos 45'; Salgado (yellow card) 48'; Guti (yellow card) 79'		Alkiza 36'; Gurpegui (yellow card) 45'	Stadium: Santiago Bernabéu; Attendance: 72,000

=== Copa del Rey ===
11 September 2002 Round of 64	San Sebastián	1–8	Real Madrid	San Sebastián de los Reyes
	Roa Sánchez 13'		Tote 23', 40', 70'; Portillo 33', 50', 88'; Solari 56'; Morientes 68'	Stadium: Nuevo Matapiñonera; Referee: Eduardo Iturralde González

6 November 2002 Round of 32	Real Oviedo	0–4	Real Madrid	Oviedo
			Portillo 33', 77'; Tote 46', 52'	Stadium: Estadio Carlos Tartiere; Attendance: 20,000; Referee: José Javier Losantos Omar

8 January 2003 Round of 16, First Leg	Terrassa FC	3–3	Real Madrid	Terrassa
	Babangida 62'; Monti 81', 84'		Portillo 25' (pen.); Guti 68', 71'	Stadium: Olympic; Attendance: 11,000; Referee: Eduardo Iturralde González

14 January 2003 Round of 16, Second Leg	Real Madrid	4–2 (7–5 agg.)	Terrassa FC	Madrid
	Celades 21'; Hierro 36' (pen.); Portillo 77'; McManaman 84'		Monti 68'; Besora 89'	Stadium: Santiago Bernabéu; Attendance: 15,000; Referee: Rafael Ramírez Domínguez

23 January 2003 Quarter-finals, First Leg	Real Madrid	1–1	RCD Mallorca	Madrid
	Portillo 12'		Nadal 57'	Stadium: Santiago Bernabéu; Attendance: 30,000; Referee: Manuel Mejuto González

29 January 2003 Quarter-finals, Second Leg	RCD Mallorca	4–0 (5–1 agg.)	Real Madrid	Palma de Mallorca
	Niño 7'; Eto'o 30', 35'; Pandiani 48'			Stadium: Son Moix; Attendance: 30,000; Referee: Jesús Téllez Sánchez

=== UEFA Champions League ===
==== First group stage ====
Pos	Team	Pld	W	D	L	GF	GA	GD	Pts	Qualification	RMA	ROM	AEK	GNK
1	(Spain) Real Madrid	6	2	3	1	15	7	+8	9	Advance to second group stage	—	0–1	2–2	6–0
2	(Italy) Roma	6	2	3	1	3	4	−1	9	Advance to second group stage	0–3	—	1–1	0–0
3	(Greece) AEK Athens	6	0	6	0	7	7	0	6	Transfer to UEFA Cup	3–3	0–0	—	1–1
4	(Belgium) Genk	6	0	4	2	2	9	−7	4		1–1	0–1	0–0	—

Source: RSSSF

17 September 2002	Roma (Italy)	0–3	(Spain) Real Madrid	Stadio Olimpico, Rome
20:45 (20:45 UTC+2)		Report	Guti 41', 74'; Raúl 56'	Attendance: 71,130; Referee: Markus Merk

25 September 2002	Real Madrid (Spain)	6–0	(Belgium) Genk	Santiago Bernabéu Stadium, Madrid
20:45 (20:45 UTC+2)	Zokora 44' (o.g.); Salgado 45+1'; Figo 55'; Guti 64'; Celades 74'; Raúl 76'	Report		Attendance: 65,700; Referee: Knud Erik Fisker

2 October 2002	AEK Athens (Greece)	3–3	(Spain) Real Madrid	Nikos Goumas Stadium, Athens
20:45 (21:45 UTC+3)	Tsiartas 6'; Maladenis 25'; Nikolaidis 28'	Report	Zidane 15', 39'; Guti 60'	Attendance: 9,444; Referee: Valentin Ivanov

22 October 2002	Real Madrid (Spain)	2–2	(Greece) AEK Athens	Santiago Bernabéu Stadium, Madrid
20:45 (20:45 UTC+2)	McManaman 24', 43'	Report	Katsouranis 74'; Centeno 86'	Attendance: 58,343; Referee: Herbert Fandel

30 October 2002	Real Madrid (Spain)	0–1	(Italy) Roma	Santiago Bernabéu Stadium, Madrid
20:45 (20:45 UTC+1)		Report	Totti 27'	Attendance: 72,035; Referee: Hugh Dallas

12 November 2002	Genk (Belgium)	1–1	(Spain) Real Madrid	Cristal Arena, Genk
20:45 (20:45 UTC+1)	Sonck 86'	Report	Tote 21'	Attendance: 22,260; Referee: Jacek Granat

==== Second group stage ====
Pos	Team	Pld	W	D	L	GF	GA	GD	Pts	Qualification	MIL	RMA	DOR	LMO
1	(Italy) Milan	6	4	0	2	5	4	+1	12	Advance to knockout stage	—	1–0	0–1	1–0
2	(Spain) Real Madrid	6	3	2	1	9	6	+3	11	Advance to knockout stage	3–1	—	2–1	2–2
3	(Germany) Borussia Dortmund	6	3	1	2	8	5	+3	10		0–1	1–1	—	3–0
4	(Russia) Lokomotiv Moscow	6	0	1	5	3	10	−7	1		0–1	0–1	1–2	—

Source: RSSSF

26 November 2002	AC Milan (Italy)	1–0	(Spain) Real Madrid	San Siro, Milan
20:45 (20:45 UTC+1)	Shevchenko 40'	Report		Attendance: 81,685; Referee: Urs Meier

11 December 2002	Real Madrid (Spain)	2–2	(Russia) Lokomotiv Moscow	Santiago Bernabéu Stadium, Madrid
20:45 (20:45 UTC+1)	Raúl 21', 76'	Report	Obiorah 47'; Mnguni 74'	Attendance: 51,313; Referee: Graham Barber

19 February 2003	Real Madrid (Spain)	2–1	(Germany) Borussia Dortmund	Santiago Bernabéu Stadium, Madrid
20:45 (20:45 UTC+1)	Raúl 43'; Ronaldo 56'	Report	Koller 30'	Attendance: 63,211; Referee: Ľuboš Micheľ

25 February 2003	Borussia Dortmund (Germany)	1–1	(Spain) Real Madrid	Westfalenstadion, Dortmund
20:45 (20:45 UTC+1)	Koller 23'	Report	Portillo 90+2'	Attendance: 52,400; Referee: Graham Poll

12 March 2003	Real Madrid (Spain)	3–1	(Italy) AC Milan	Santiago Bernabéu Stadium, Madrid
20:45 (20:45 UTC+1)	Raúl 12', 57'; Guti 86'	Report	Rivaldo 81'	Attendance: 77,824; Referee: Kim Milton Nielsen

18 March 2003	Lokomotiv Moscow (Russia)	0–1	(Spain) Real Madrid	Lokomotiv Stadium, Moscow
18:30 (20:30 UTC+3)		Report	Ronaldo 35'	Attendance: 27,000; Referee: Claude Colombo

==== Quarter-finals ====
15 April 2003	Real Madrid (Spain)	3–1	(England) Manchester United	Santiago Bernabéu Stadium, Madrid
20:45 (20:45 UTC+2)	Figo 12'; Raúl 28', 49'	Report	Van Nistelrooy 52'	Attendance: 74,663; Referee: Anders Frisk

23 April 2003	Manchester United (England)	4–3 (5–6 agg.)	(Spain) Real Madrid	Old Trafford, Manchester
20:45 (19:45 UTC+1)	Van Nistelrooy 43'; Helguera 52' (o.g.); Beckham 71', 85'	Report	Ronaldo 12', 50', 59'	Attendance: 66,708; Referee: Pierluigi Collina

==== Semi-finals ====
6 May 2003	Real Madrid (Spain)	2–1	(Italy) Juventus	Santiago Bernabéu Stadium, Madrid
20:45 (20:45 UTC+2)	Ronaldo 23'; Roberto Carlos 73'	Report	Trezeguet 45'	Attendance: 74,773; Referee: Terje Hauge

14 May 2003	Juventus (Italy)	3–1 (4–3 agg.)	(Spain) Real Madrid	Stadio delle Alpi, Turin
20:45 (20:45 UTC+2)	Trezeguet 12'; Del Piero 43'; Nedvěd 73'	Report	Zidane 89'	Attendance: 60,253; Referee: Urs Meier

=== UEFA Super Cup ===
30 August 2002	Real Madrid (Spain)	3–1	(Netherlands) Feyenoord	Monaco
	Paauwe 15' (o.g.); Roberto Carlos 21'; Guti 60'		Van Hooijdonk 56'	Stadium: Stade Louis II; Attendance: 18,284; Referee: Hugh Dallas

=== Intercontinental Cup ===
3 December 2002	Real Madrid (Spain)	2–0	(Paraguay) Olimpia	Yokohama, Japan
	Ronaldo 14'; Guti 84'			Stadium: International Stadium Yokohama; Attendance: 66,070; Referee: Carlos Simon

== Statistics ==
=== Player statistics ===
No.	Pos	Nat	Player	Total		La Liga		Copa del Rey		Champions League	
No.	Pos	Nat	Player	Apps	Goals	Apps	Goals	Apps	Goals	Apps	Goals
1	GK	(Spain) ESP	Casillas	53	-63	38	-42	0	0	15	-21
2	DF	(Spain) ESP	Salgado	50	1	35	0	0	0	15	1
6	DF	(Spain) ESP	Helguera	49	6	33	6	1	0	14+1	0
4	DF	(Spain) ESP	Hierro	36	1	25	0	1	1	10	0
3	DF	(Brazil) BRA	Roberto Carlos	53	6	37	5	1	0	15	1
10	MF	(Portugal) POR	Figo	49	12	33	10	0+1	0	15	2
24	MF	(France) FRA	Makelele	40	0	29	0	0	0	11	0
16	MF	(Brazil) BRA	Conceicao	32	1	21+1	1	2	0	7+1	0
5	MF	(France) FRA	Zidane	48	12	32+1	9	1	0	14	3
7	FW	(Spain) ESP	Raúl	45	25	30+1	16	1+1	0	12	9
11	FW	(Brazil) BRA	Ronaldo	43	29	29+2	23	1	0	10+1	6
13	GK	(Spain) ESP	César	7	-12	0	0	6	-11	1	-1
14	MF	(Spain) ESP	Guti	52	11	17+17	4	2+1	2	8+7	5
19	MF	(Argentina) ARG	Cambiasso	37	0	18+6	0	4	0	8+1	0
22	DF	(Spain) ESP	Pavon	37	0	17+5	0	6	0	8+1	0
21	MF	(Argentina) ARG	Solari	42	1	6+22	0	2+1	1	2+9	0
9	FW	(Spain) ESP	Morientes	28	6	3+16	5	0+2	1	3+4	0
8	MF	(England) ENG	McManaman	27	4	6+9	1	6	1	2+4	2
17	DF	(Spain) ESP	Miñambres	24	0	5+11	0	5	0	1+2	0
18	FW	(Spain) ESP	Portillo	23	14	1+9	5	6	8	0+7	1
20	MF	(Spain) ESP	Celades	13	2	0+3	0	6	1	4	1
12	FW	(Spain) ESP	Tote	6	6	1	0	4	5	1	1
29	DF	(Spain) ESP	Rubén	6	0	1	0	4+1	0		
32	DF	(Spain) ESP	Borja	1	0	0	0	0+1	0		
33	FW	(Spain) ESP	Luis García	1	0	0	0	0+1	0		
38	MF	(Spain) ESP	Álex Pérez	1	0	0	0	0+1	0		
26	GK	(Spain) ESP	Sánchez	0	0	0	0				
28	MF	(Spain) ESP	Cabrera								
30	GK	(Spain) ESP	Codina								
31	DF	(Spain) ESP	Corrales								
35	DF	(Spain) ESP	Angelo								
36	DF	(Spain) ESP	Duque								
37	DF	(Spain) ESP	Olalla	1	0	0	0	0+1	0		
39	DF	(Spain) ESP	Navas								
15	DF	(Spain) ESP	Bravo	10	1	1+1	1	6	0	0+2	0
32	MF	(Spain) ESP	Valdo	1	0	0	0	1	0		

- Source: https://www.bdfutbol.com/en/t/t2002-032.html

=== Goalscorers ===
Rank	No.	Pos	Nat	Name	La Liga	Copa del Rey	Champions League	Super Cup	Intercontinental Cup	Total
1	11	FW	(Brazil)	Ronaldo	23	0	6	0	1	30
2	7	FW	(Spain)	Raúl	16	0	9	0	0	25
3	18	FW	(Spain)	Javier Portillo	5	8	1	0	0	14
4	14	MF	(Spain)	Guti	4	2	5	1	1	13
5	5	MF	(France)	Zinedine Zidane	9	0	3	0	0	12
5	10	MF	(Portugal)	Luís Figo	10	0	2	0	0	12
7	3	DF	(Brazil)	Roberto Carlos	5	0	1	1	0	7
8	6	DF	(Spain)	Ivan Helguera	6	0	0	0	0	6
8	9	FW	(Spain)	Fernando Morientes	5	1	0	0	0	6
8	12	FW	(Spain)	Tote	0	5	1	0	0	6
11	8	MF	(England)	Steve McManaman	1	1	2	0	0	4
12	20	MF	(Spain)	Albert Celades	0	1	1	0	0	2
13	2	DF	(Spain)	Míchel Salgado	0	0	1	0	0	1
13	4	DF	(Spain)	Fernando Hierro	0	1	0	0	0	1
13	15	DF	(Spain)	Raúl Bravo	1	0	0	0	0	1
13	16	MF	(Brazil)	Flávio Conceição	1	0	0	0	0	1
13	21	MF	(Argentina)	Santiago Solari	0	1	0	0	0	1
Own goal					0	0	1	1	0	2
Totals					86	20	33	3	2	144
