= 2001–02 Real Valladolid season =

Real Valladolid
2001–02 season
- President: Carlos Suárez Sureda
- Head coach: Pepe Moré
- Stadium: José Zorrilla
- La Liga: 12th
- Copa del Rey: Quarter-finals
- Top goalscorer: League: Fernando Fernández (15); All: Fernando Fernández (16)
- Average home league attendance: 13,116
- Biggest defeat: 6–0 against Real Sociedad

The 2001–02 season was the 74th in the history of Real Valladolid and their ninth consecutive season in the top flight. The club participated in La Liga and Copa del Rey.

== Players ==
Note: Flags indicate national team as defined under FIFA eligibility rules; some limited exceptions apply. Players may hold more than one non-FIFA nationality.

No.	Pos.	Nation	Player
—	GK	(Spain) ESP	Ricardo
—	GK	(Argentina) ARG	Albano Bizzarri
—	DF	(Spain) ESP	Javier Torres Gómez
—	DF	(Spain) ESP	Alberto Marcos
—	DF	(Spain) ESP	Mario
—	DF	(Bolivia) BOL	Juan Manuel Peña
—	DF	(Argentina) ARG	Pablo Ricchetti
—	DF	(Spain) ESP	Manuel Tena
—	MF	(Spain) ESP	Chema

No.	Pos.	Nation	Player
—	MF	(Spain) ESP	Óscar González
—	MF	(Spain) ESP	Jesús Sánchez Japón
—	MF	(Colombia) COL	Harold Lozano
—	MF	(Spain) ESP	Fernando Sales
—	MF	(Spain) ESP	José Luis Caminero
—	FW	(Mexico) MEX	Cuauhtémoc Blanco
—	FW	(Spain) ESP	Tote
—	FW	(Spain) ESP	Fernando
—	FW	(Spain) ESP	Luis García

== Pre-season and friendlies ==
Win Draw Loss

== Competitions ==
=== Overall record ===
Competition	First match	Last match	Starting round	Final position	Record							
Competition	First match	Last match	Starting round	Final position	Pld	W	D	L	GF	GA	GD	Win %
La Liga	26 August 2001	11 May 2002	Matchday 1	12th	38	13	9	16	45	58	−13	34.21
Copa del Rey	10 October 2001	16 January 2002	Round of 64	Quarter-finals	6	4	1	1	10	5	+5	66.67
Total					44	17	10	17	55	63	−8	38.64

Source: Competitions

=== La Liga ===
==== League table ====
Pos	Team	Pld	W	D	L	GF	GA	GD	Pts	Qualification or relegation
10	Málaga	38	13	14	11	44	44	0	53 (Note: SEV: 7 pts → SEV 3–3 ATH; ATH: 7 pts → ATH 0–1 SEV; MLG: 3 pts)	Qualification for the Intertoto Cup third round
11	Rayo Vallecano	38	13	10	15	46	52	−6	49	
12	Valladolid	38	13	9	16	45	58	−13	48	
13	Real Sociedad	38	13	8	17	48	54	−6	47 (Note: ESP 1–2 RSO; RSO 1–0 ESP)	
14	Espanyol	38	13	8	17	47	56	−9	47	

Source: LFP
Rules for classification: 1st points; 2nd head-to-head points; 3rd head-to-head goal difference; 4th head-to-head goals scored; 5th goal difference; 6th number of goals scored; 7th Fair-play points

==== Results summary ====
Overall								Home						Away					
Pld	W	D	L	GF	GA	GD	Pts	W	D	L	GF	GA	GD	W	D	L	GF	GA	GD
0	0	0	0	0	0	0	0	0	0	0	0	0	0	0	0	0	0	0	0

Source: La Liga

==== Results by round ====
Round	1	2	3	4	5	6	7	8	9	10	11	12	13	14	15	16	17	18	19	20	21	22	23	24	25	26	27	28	29	30	31	32	33	34	35	36	37	38
Ground	A	H	A	H	A	H	H	A	H	A	H	A	H	A	H	A	H	A	H	H	A	H	A	H	A	A	H	A	H	A	H	A	H	A	H	A	H	A
Result	L	D	W	L	D	L	W	W	L	D	W	L	W	L	W	L	D	L	W	W	W	D	L	W	L	D	W	L	L	D	L	D	D	L	W	W	L	L
Position																																						

Source: La Liga
A = Away; H = Home; W = Win; D = Draw; L = Loss

==== Matches ====
26 August 2001 1	Deportivo de La Coruña	4–0	Valladolid	A Coruña
	Víctor 45'; Valerón 61'; Makaay 66'; Tristán 68'			Stadium: Riazor; Attendance: 30,000; Referee: César Muñiz Fernández

9 September 2001 2	Valladolid	1–1	Valencia	Valladolid
	Caminero 30'		Salva 88'	Stadium: José Zorrilla; Attendance: 12,000; Referee: Miguel Ángel Pérez Lasa

16 September 2001 3	Málaga	1–2	Valladolid	Málaga
	Canabal 78'		Fernando 33' (pen.); Tote 89'	Stadium: La Rosaleda; Attendance: 14,000; Referee: Alberto Undiano Mallenco

23 September 2001 4	Valladolid	0–2	Real Betis	Valladolid
			Varela 52'; Denílson 71'	Stadium: José Zorrilla; Attendance: 11,000; Referee: Alexis Manuel Pérez Pérez

29 September 2001 5	Real Madrid	2–2	Valladolid	Madrid
21:30	Zidane 4'; Raúl 19'		Fernando 5'; Blanco 88'	Stadium: Santiago Bernabéu; Attendance: 55,000; Referee: Jesús Téllez Sánchez

3 October 2001 6	Valladolid	0–1	Espanyol	Valladolid
			Posse 31'	Stadium: José Zorrilla; Referee: Juan Ansuátegui Roca

7 October 2001 7	Valladolid	1–0	Las Palmas	Valladolid
	Turu 6'			Stadium: José Zorrilla; Referee: Eduardo Iturralde González

14 October 2001 8	Athletic Bilbao	1–4	Valladolid	Bilbao
	Urzaiz 56'		Tote 36', 43', 77'; Blanco 71'	Stadium: San Mamés; Referee: Carlos Megía Dávila

21 October 2001 9	Valladolid	1–3	Alavés	Valladolid
	García 56' (pen.)		Coloccini 19', 48'; Navarro 21'	Stadium: José Zorrilla; Referee: Antonio López Nieto

28 October 2001 10	Celta Vigo	1–1	Valladolid	Vigo
	Mostovoi 89'		Tote 50'	Stadium: Estadio Balaídos; Referee: Rafael Ramírez Domínguez

4 November 2001 11	Valladolid	1–0	Villarreal	Valladolid
	Tote 18'			Stadium: José Zorrilla; Referee: Fernando Carmona Méndez

11 November 2001 12	Barcelona	4–0	Valladolid	Barcelona
	Saviola 18', 88'; Puyol 20'; Kluivert 63' (pen.)			Stadium: Camp Nou; Referee: Miguel Ángel Pérez Lasa

18 November 2001 13	Valladolid	2–0	Zaragoza	Valladolid
	Blanco 20' (pen.); Fernando 70'			Stadium: José Zorrilla; Referee: Alfonso Pérez Burrull

25 November 2001 14	Sevilla	4–0	Valladolid	Seville
	Moisés 31' (pen.); Reyes 55'; Casquero 68', 80'			Stadium: Ramón Sánchez Pizjuán; Referee: Antoni Llonch Andreu

2 December 2001 15	Valladolid	3–1	Rayo Vallecano	Valladolid
				Stadium: José Zorrilla

9 December 2001 16	Osasuna	1–0	Valladolid	Pamplona
				Stadium: El Sadar

16 December 2001 17	Valladolid	0–0	Tenerife	Valladolid
				Stadium: José Zorrilla

22 December 2001 18	Real Sociedad	6–0	Valladolid	San Sebastián
				Stadium: Anoeta

6 January 2002 19	Valladolid	2–1	Mallorca	Valladolid
				Stadium: José Zorrilla

13 January 2002 20	Valladolid	3–0	Deportivo La Coruña	Valladolid
				Stadium: José Zorrilla

20 January 2002 21	Valencia	1–2	Valladolid	Valencia
				Stadium: Mestalla

27 January 2002 22	Valladolid	0–0	Málaga	Valladolid
				Stadium: José Zorrilla

3 February 2002 23	Real Betis	2–0	Valladolid	Seville
				Stadium: Manuel Ruiz de Lopera

6 February 2002 24	Valladolid	2–1	Real Madrid	Valladolid
				Stadium: José Zorrilla

10 February 2002 25	Espanyol	1–0	Valladolid	Barcelona
				Stadium: Estadi Olímpic Lluís Companys

17 February 2002 26	Las Palmas	1–1	Valladolid	Las Palmas
				Stadium: Insular

24 February 2002 27	Valladolid	2–0	Athletic Bilbao	Valladolid
				Stadium: José Zorrilla

3 March 2002 28	Alavés	3–1	Valladolid	Vitoria-Gasteiz
				Stadium: Mendizorrotza

10 March 2002 29	Valladolid	2–4	Celta Vigo	Valladolid
				Stadium: José Zorrilla

17 March 2002 30	Villarreal	2–2	Valladolid	Villarreal
				Stadium: El Madrigal

24 March 2002 31	Valladolid	1–2	Barcelona	Valladolid
				Stadium: José Zorrilla

31 March 2002 32	Zaragoza	0–0	Valladolid	Zaragoza
				Stadium: La Romareda

7 April 2002 33	Valladolid	1–1	Sevilla	Valladolid
				Stadium: José Zorrilla

14 April 2002 34	Rayo Vallecano	1–0	Valladolid	Madrid
				Stadium: Campo de Fútbol de Vallecas

21 April 2002 35	Valladolid	1–0	Osasuna	Valladolid
	Tote 64'			Stadium: José Zorrilla; Referee: Alfonso Pérez Burrull

28 April 2002 36	Tenerife	1–5	Valladolid	Santa Cruz de Tenerife
				Stadium: Heliodoro Rodríguez López

5 May 2002 37	Valladolid	1–3	Real Sociedad	Valladolid
				Stadium: José Zorrilla

11 May 2002 38	Mallorca	2–1	Valladolid	Mallorca
	Ibagaza 51'; Luque 73'		Fernando 36'	Stadium: Son Moix; Referee: Víctor José Esquinas Torres

=== Copa del Rey ===
10 October 2001 Round of 64	Ourense	1–1 (3–5 p)	Valladolid	Ourense
				Stadium: Estadio O Couto

28 November 2001 Round of 32	Racing Ferrol	1–2	Valladolid	Ferrol
				Stadium: Estadio Municipal da Malata

12 December 2001 Round of 16; First leg	Badajoz	1–3	Valladolid	Badajoz
20:30				Stadium: Estadio Nuevo Vivero; Attendance: 5,000; Referee: Luis Medina Cantalejo

19 December 2001 Round of 16; Second leg	Valladolid	3–0 (6–1 agg.)	Badajoz	Valladolid
21:30				Stadium: José Zorrilla; Attendance: 4,500; Referee: Víctor José Esquinas Torres

9 January 2002 Quarter-finals; First leg	Deportivo La Coruña	2–0	Valladolid	A Coruña
20:45				Stadium: Estadio Riazor; Attendance: 14,000; Referee: Manuel Mejuto González

16 January 2002 Quarter-finals; Second leg	Valladolid	2–1 (a.e.t.) (2–3 agg.)	Deportivo La Coruña	Valladolid
21:45				Stadium: José Zorrilla; Attendance: 5,000; Referee: Juan Fernández Marin

== Statistics ==
=== Goalscorers ===
Rank	Pos	No.	Nat	Name	La Liga	Copa del Rey	Total
1	FW	24	(Spain)	Fernando Fernández	15	1	16
2	FW	14	(Spain)	Luis García	7	3	10
3	MF	22	(Spain)	Fernando Sales	6	2	8
3	FW	9	(Spain)	Tote	7	1	8
5	FW	11	(Mexico)	Cuauhtémoc Blanco	3	0	3
Own goals					0	0	0
Totals					45	11	56
