= Antonio Santos =

Antonio Santos may refer to:

- António Machado Santos (1875–1921), Portuguese navy officer
- Antonio Santos Peralba (1885–?), Spanish football administrator
- António de Almeida Santos (1926–2016), Portuguese politician
- Antônio Carlos Santos (born 1964), Brazilian footballer
- Antonio Santos (baseball) (born 1996), Dominican baseball player
- Antonio Santos Sánchez (born 1998), Mexican footballer
- Antonio Sánchez Santos, Spanish football coach for the 1997–98 Real Valladolid season

== See also ==
- Antonio dos Santos (disambiguation)
- Antonio Santosuosso
- Santo António (disambiguation)
