= Duque =

Duque is a Spanish surname meaning "duke".

== People ==
Notable people with the name include:

- Duque (footballer), nickname of Davi Ferreira (1926–2017), Brazilian footballer and manager
- Jaime Enrique Duque Correa (1943–2013), Colombian Roman Catholic bishop
- Andrés Duque (21st century), American activist
- Carlos Duque (1930–2014), Panamanian politician
- Cynthia Duque (born 1992), Mexican beauty pageant winner
- Francisco Duque III (born 1957), Filipino politician
- Iván Duque Márquez (born 1976), President of Colombia from 2018
- Jaime Duque (1931–1980), Colombian fencer
- Jefferson Duque (born 1987), Colombian footballer
- Juan Carlos Duque (born 1982), Spanish footballer
- Leonardo Duque (born 1980), Colombian cyclist
- María Antonieta Duque (born 1970), Venezuelan television presenter, comedian and actress
- Mariana Duque (born 1989), Colombian tennis player
- Martin Duque (2003–2018), one of the 17 victims who was killed in the Stoneman Douglas High School shooting
- Orlando Duque (born 1974), Colombian diver
- Pedro Duque (born 1963), Spanish astronaut
- Reynaldo A. Duque (1945–2013), Filipino writer
- Ximena Duque (born 1985), Colombian actress
- Pedro Duque y Cornejo (1677–1757), Spanish Baroque painter and sculptor
- Juan Carlos Duque Gancedo (born 1982), Spanish footballer
- Arturo Duque Villegas (1899–1977), Colombian Roman Catholic archbishop

== Fictional entities ==
- Fernando Duque, Pablo Escobar's lawyer and liaison with the Colombian government in Narcos
- The Duque Family in the American TV series Cane
