= Toninho dos Santos =

Toninho dos Santos may refer to:

- Toninho dos Santos (footballer, born 1965), Brazilian footballer
- Toninho dos Santos (footballer, born 1980), Bissau-Guinean footballer

== See also ==
- Antonio dos Santos (disambiguation)
