= 1997–98 Real Valladolid season =

Real Valladolid
1997–98 season
- President: Marcos Fernández Fernández; Marcos Fernández Fermoselle
- Head coach: Vicente Cantatore; Antonio Sánchez Santos; Sergije Krešić
- La Liga: 11th
- Copa del Rey: Round of 16
- UEFA Cup: Second round

During the 1997–98 Spanish football season, Real Valladolid competed in La Liga

== Season summary ==
Valladolid were unable to improve on the previous season's seventh-place finish and dropped four places down the table. The club's UEFA Cup excursion was short-lived, as they were swiftly eliminated by Russians Spartak Moscow in the second round. As of 2016, this is the last time Valladolid have competed in European competition.

== Squad ==
Squad at end of season

Note: Flags indicate national team as defined under FIFA eligibility rules; some limited exceptions apply. Players may hold more than one non-FIFA nationality.

No.	Pos.	Nation	Player
1	GK	ESP	César Sánchez
2	DF	ESP	Juan Carlos I
3	DF	ESP	Alberto Marcos
5	DF	ESP	José García Calvo
6	DF	ESP	José Luis Santamaría
8	DF	ESP	Javier Torres Gómez
9	FW	CRO	Alen Peternac
10	MF	ESP	Eusebio
11	FW	ESP	José Luis Soto
12	DF	BRA	Júlio César
13	GK	ESP	Agustín Elduayen
14	MF	ESP	Chema
15	FW	ESP	Juan Carlos II

No.	Pos.	Nation	Player
17	DF	BOL	Juan Manuel Peña
19	FW	ESP	Manuel Canabal (on loan from Real Madrid)
20	MF	COL	Harold Lozano
21	FW	ESP	Víctor
22	MF	ESP	José María Quevedo
23	MF	ESP	Benjamín
24	FW	ARG	Diego Klimowicz
25	DF	ARG	Gabriel Heinze
26	GK	ESP	Iván Alonso
27	MF	ESP	Jesús Turiel
28	DF	ESP	David Gómez
32	FW	ESP	David Jiménez

=== Left club during season ===
Note: Flags indicate national team as defined under FIFA eligibility rules; some limited exceptions apply. Players may hold more than one non-FIFA nationality.

No.	Pos.	Nation	Player
7	MF	ESP	Raúl Ibañez (on loan to Levante)
16	MF	URU	Alvaro Gutierrez (to Rayo Vallecano)

No.	Pos.	Nation	Player
18	MF	BRA	Edu Manga (released)

== Results ==
=== UEFA Cup ===
==== First round ====
16 September 1997	Real Valladolid (Spain)	2–0	(Latvia) Skonto	Valladolid
	Juan Carlos 30' (pen.); Edu Manga 30'	Report

30 September 1997	Skonto (Latvia)	1–0	(Spain) Real Valladolid	Riga
	Miholaps 6'	Report

Real Valladolid won 2–1 on aggregate.

==== Second round ====
21 October 1997	Spartak Moscow (Russia)	2–0	(Spain) Real Valladolid	Moscow
	Tikhonov 60'; Titov 84'	Report

4 November 1997	Real Valladolid (Spain)	1–2	(Russia) Spartak Moscow	Valladolid
	Juan Carlos 90'	Report	Shirko 64', 87'

Spartak Moscow won 4–1 on aggregate.
