= Jordi Codina =

Spanish footballer (born 1982)

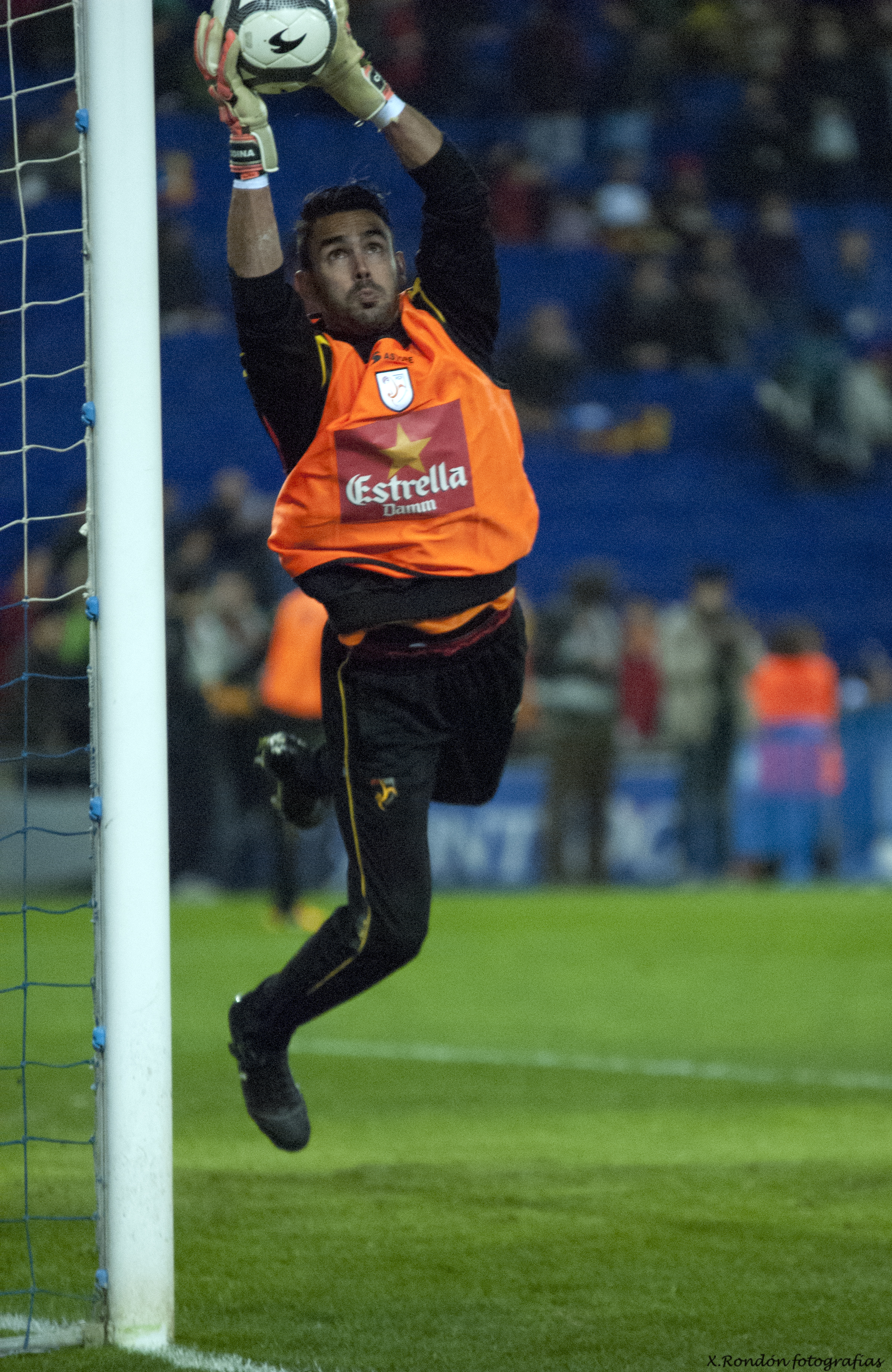
- Codina before a match with Catalonia in 2012

Personal information
- Full name: Jordi Codina Rodríguez
- Date of birth: 27 April 1982 (age 44)
- Place of birth: Barcelona, Spain
- Height: 1.89 m (6 ft 2 in)
- Position: Goalkeeper

Youth career
- 1998–2000: Damm
- 2000–2002: Espanyol

Senior career*
Years	Team	Apps	(Gls)
2002–2007	Real Madrid B	79	(0)
2007–2009	Real Madrid	1	(0)
2009–2015	Getafe	68	(0)
2015–2016	APOEL	0	(0)
2016	→ Pafos (loan)	16	(0)
2016–2017	Reus	0	(0)
2017–2018	Fuenlabrada	13	(0)
2018	Móstoles	6	(0)
Total		183	(0)

International career
2008–2013	Catalonia	4	(0)
- * Club domestic league appearances and goals

Jordi Codina Rodríguez (born 27 April 1982) is a Spanish former professional footballer who played as a goalkeeper.

== Club career ==
Born in Barcelona, Catalonia, Codina arrived at Real Madrid in 2002 at the age of 20, having developed in the youth system of local side Espanyol. After the departure of Carlos Sánchez and David Cobeño, he became first-choice with the reserve side – Antonio Adán was the backup and Kiko Casilla third-choice, as he eventually gained Castilla's captaincy.

Codina made his professional debut in the second division in the 2005–06 season, against Sporting Gijón. In the last of his five years with the B-team, he played 35 of 38 games for a total of 3,150 minutes.

At the start of 2007–08, Codina was promoted to Real Madrid's main squad as third goalkeeper, after Iker Casillas and Jerzy Dudek. As they had already been crowned league champions, he made his first and sole official appearance for the club in the last match of the campaign, playing the full 90 minutes in a 5–2 home win against Levante on 18 May 2008.

On 2 July 2009, Codina moved to fellow La Liga side Getafe, also in Madrid, on a free transfer, signing a three-year contract and reuniting with former Castilla manager Míchel. In his debut season and the following, he constantly battled for first-choice status with Argentine Óscar Ustari.

Codina left in June 2015, after his link expired. On the 11th, aged 33, he moved abroad for the first time in his career and signed a two-year deal with Cypriot club APOEL. On 7 January 2016, however, after failing to appear in any competitive games, he joined fellow First Division team Pafos on a six-month loan.

On 16 July 2016, Codina cut ties with APOEL by mutual consent. Shortly after, he returned to Spain after agreeing to a one-year contract with second level team Reus.

Subsequently, Codina competed in his country's lower leagues, with Fuenlabrada and Móstoles.

== Career statistics ==
As of match played on 13 May 2018

Appearances and goals by club, season and competition
Club	Season	League			Cup		Continental		Other		Total	
Club	Season	Division	Apps	Goals	Apps	Goals	Apps	Goals	Apps	Goals	Apps	Goals
Real Madrid B	2002–03	Segunda División B	13	0	—		—		—		13	0
Real Madrid B	2003–04	Segunda División B	15	0	—		—		—		15	0
Real Madrid B	2004–05	Segunda División B	6	0	—		—		1 (Note: Appearances in Promotion Play-offs)	0	7	0
Real Madrid B	2005–06	Segunda División B	10	0	—		—		—		10	0
Real Madrid B	2006–07	Segunda División B	35	0	—		—		—		35	0
Real Madrid B	Total		79	0	—		—		1	0	80	0
Real Madrid	2005–06	La Liga	0	0	0	0	0	0	—		0	0
Real Madrid	2007–08	La Liga	1	0	0	0	0	0	0	0	1	0
Real Madrid	2008–09	La Liga	0	0	0	0	0	0	0	0	0	0
Real Madrid	Total		1	0	0	0	0	0	0	0	1	0
Getafe	2009–10	La Liga	22	0	3	0	—		—		25	0
Getafe	2010–11	La Liga	23	0	0	0	1 (Note: Appearances in UEFA Europa League)	0	—		24	0
Getafe	2011–12	La Liga	2	0	2	0	—		—		4	0
Getafe	2012–13	La Liga	7	0	2	0	—		—		9	0
Getafe	2013–14	La Liga	9	0	4	0	—		—		13	0
Getafe	2014–15	La Liga	5	0	3	0	—		—		8	0
Getafe	Total		68	0	14	0	1	0	—		83	0
APOEL	2015–16	Cypriot First Division	0	0	0	0	0 (Note: Appearances in UEFA Champions League and UEFA Europa League)	0	0 (Note: Appearances in Cypriot Super Cup)	0	0	0
Pafos (loan)	2015–16	Cypriot First Division	16	0	2	0	—		—		18	0
Reus	2016–17	Segunda División	0	0	1	0	—		—		1	0
Fuenlabrada	2017–18	Segunda División B	10	0	3	0	—		—		13	0
Career total			174	0	20	0	1	0	1	0	196	0

== Honours ==
Real Madrid

- La Liga: 2007–08
- Supercopa de España: runner-up 2007
