= Esteban Cambiasso =

Argentine footballer (born 1980)

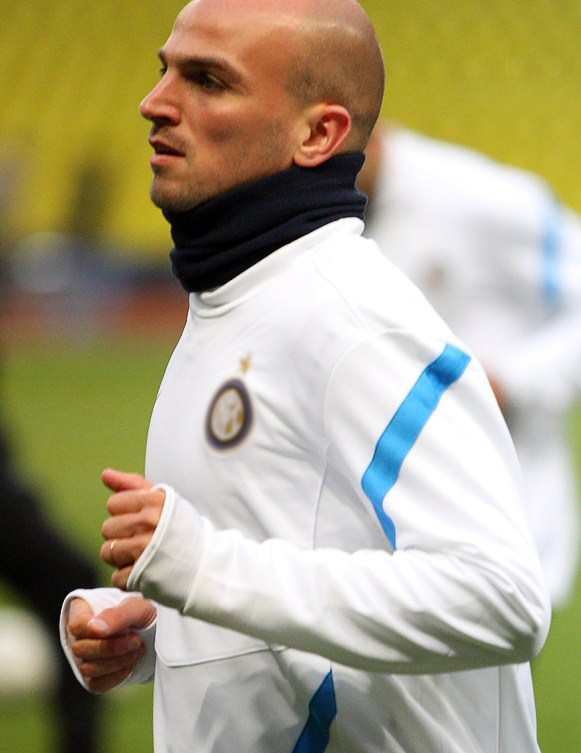
- Cambiasso with Inter Milan in 2011

Personal information
- Full name: Esteban Matías Cambiasso Deleau
- Date of birth: 18 August 1980 (age 46)
- Place of birth: Buenos Aires, Argentina
- Height: 1.77 m (5 ft 10 in)
- Position: Midfielder

Youth career
- 1995–1996: Argentinos Juniors
- 1996–1997: Real Madrid

Senior career*
Years	Team	Apps	(Gls)
1996–1998	Real Madrid B	42	(4)
1998–2001	Independiente	98	(14)
2001–2002	River Plate	37	(14)
2002–2004	Real Madrid	41	(0)
2004–2014	Inter Milan	315	(50)
2014–2015	Leicester City	31	(5)
2015–2017	Olympiacos	28	(2)
Total		592	(78)

International career
1995	Argentina U17	6	(1)
1997–1999	Argentina U20	11	(3)
2000–2011	Argentina	52	(5)
Medal record
Men's football
Representing Argentina
Copa América
Runner-up	2007 Venezuela	Team
FIFA Confederations Cup
Runner-up	2005 Germany	Team
FIFA U-20 World Cup
Winner	1997 Malaysia	Team
FIFA U-17 World Cup
Third place	1995 Ecuador	Team
South American Youth Football Championship
Winner	1997 Chile	Team
Winner	1999 Argentina	Team
- * Club domestic league appearances and goals

Esteban Matías Cambiasso Deleau (Spanish pronunciation: [esˈteβaŋ kamˈbjaso]; (Note: In isolation, Esteban is pronounced [esˈteβan].) born 18 August 1980), nicknamed "Cuchu", (Note: Spanish pronunciation: [ˈkutʃu]) is an Argentine former professional footballer who played as a midfielder.

During his career, Cambiasso won 21 official titles, the majority of which were won during his ten seasons at Inter Milan, including five Scudetti and the 2009–10 UEFA Champions League.

A full international from 2000 to 2011, Cambiasso won 52 caps for Argentina and represented the country at the 2006 World Cup, the 2005 Confederations Cup, and at the Copa América in 2007 and 2011.

== Club career ==
=== Early career ===
Cambiasso began his professional career with Argentinos Juniors in 1995, moving to Real Madrid in 1996 along with his brother Nicolás Cambiasso. In 1998, he moved back to Argentina, where he played for three years with Independiente and one with River Plate. With some good experience under his belt, he returned to Real Madrid in 2002. He helped Los Blancos win the UEFA Super Cup and the Intercontinental Cup in 2002, and the Liga and the Supercopa de España in 2003, also reaching the semi-finals of the UEFA Champions League that season. Cambiasso also reached the Copa del Rey final the following season.

=== Inter Milan ===
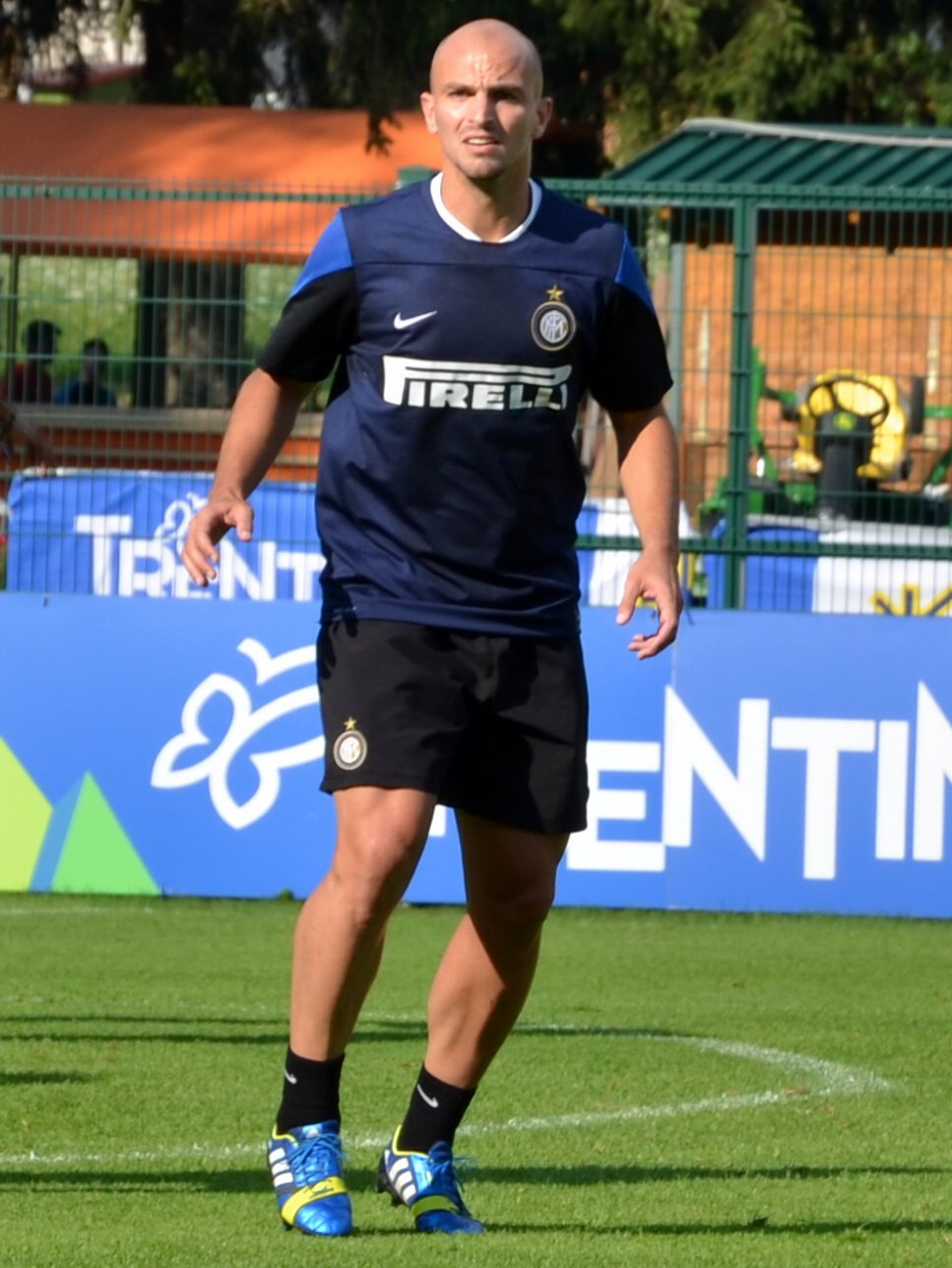
Cambiasso training with Inter in 2013

In July 2004, Cambiasso signed with Serie A club Inter Milan after his contract with Real Madrid expired in June. He helped Inter win the Coppa Italia during his first season with the club, playing regularly as a defensive midfielder, partnered in the middle of Inter's midfield with fellow Argentine Juan Sebastián Verón. In Italy, he became known as one of the outstanding players of the 2004–05 season, along with Milan's Kaká.

During the return match of the 2006 Coppa Italia Final, Cambiasso scored an impressive goal, the first of the match, for the 3–1 victory over Roma. On 9 September 2006, he scored twice in the opening game of the season, with Inter defeating Fiorentina 3–2. On 7 November 2007, he along with Zlatan Ibrahimović scored a brace apiece to defeat CSKA Moscow 4–2 in the Champions League. On 23 December, Cambiasso scored the winning goal for Inter as they came from behind to defeat city rivals Milan 2–1 in the Derby della Madonnina.

On 23 March 2009, it was announced that Inter and Cambiasso had come to terms about a contract renewal, extending his contract at the club until 2014. He was very important in the 2009–10 UEFA Champions League win as well, scoring the second goal of a 2–1 victory over Chelsea at the San Siro, a result which ultimately helped Inter go on to win the final, 2–0, against Bayern Munich on 22 May 2010. In a Champions League match against Twente on 24 November, Cambiasso scored the game's only goal, securing a place in the knockout round for the holders. On 9 January 2011, Cambiasso scored twice as Inter came from a goal down to defeat Catania 2–1.

Cambiasso received the first red card of his Inter career on 30 March 2013 for a reckless tackle on Sebastian Giovinco; he was suspended for one match. On 22 September 2013, Cambiasso scored Inter's sixth goal in their 7–0 hammering of newly promoted club Sassuolo. Four days later, Cambiasso helped Inter come from a goal down at home to Fiorentina, scoring Inter's first goal in their 2–1 victory.

At the end of the 2013–14 season, Cambiasso left Inter as his contract expired and he was not offered an extension. Technical director Piero Ausilio said, "He waited for our decision until now, and for that he must be thanked, but I'm convinced that in his future he'll have a role at Inter."

=== Leicester City ===
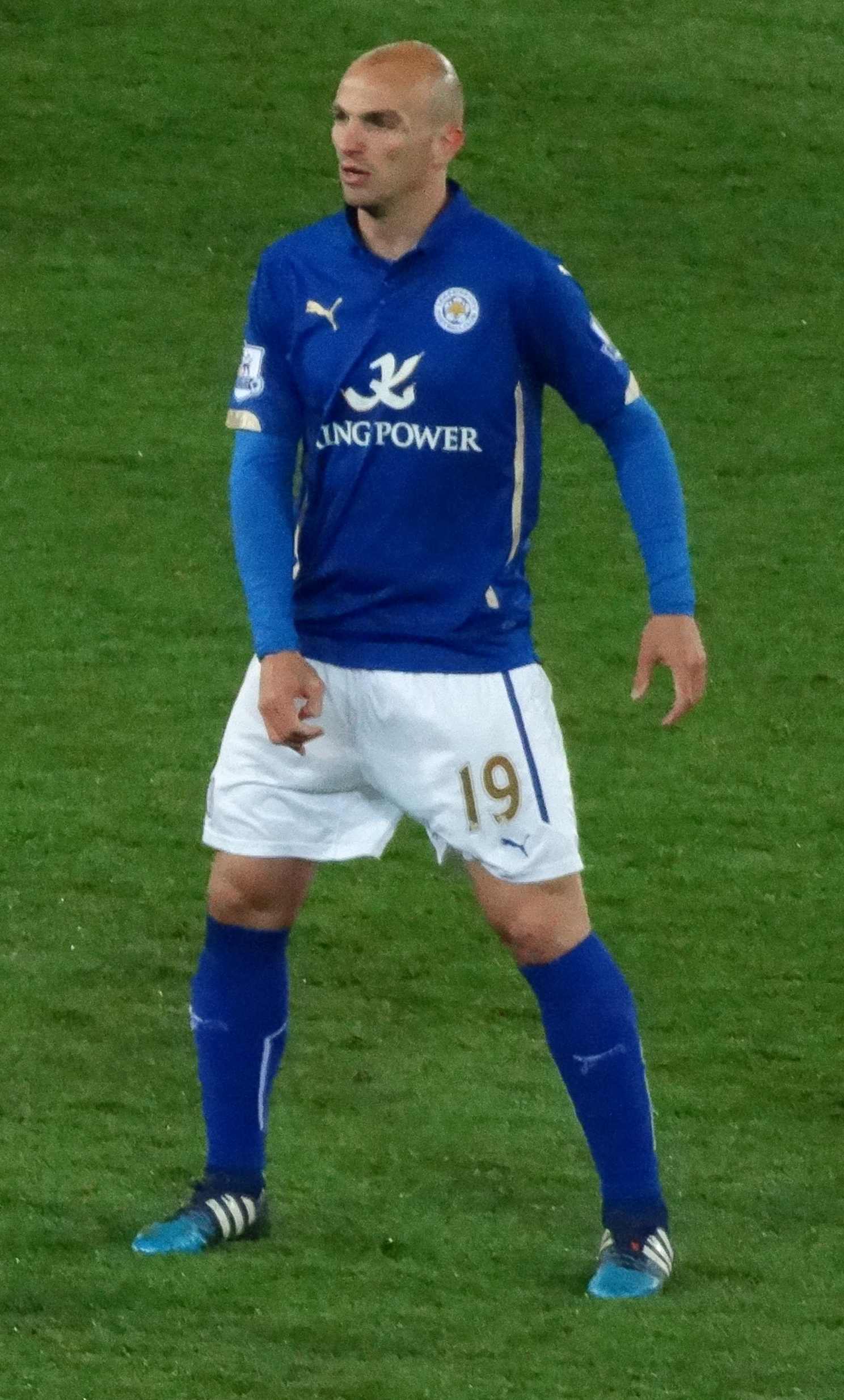
Cambiasso playing for Leicester City in 2015

On 28 August 2014, Cambiasso signed a one-year deal with newly promoted Premier League club Leicester City, joining on a free transfer, having been released by Inter at the end of their 2013–14 season. In his first interview since joining the club, Cambiasso cited the club's desperate pursuit of him and the lure of Premier League football as the reasons he signed. He was called up for his first game three days after signing, a 1–1 draw at the King Power Stadium against Arsenal, as an unused substitute. Cambiasso made his debut for Leicester on 13 September against Stoke City, coming on as a half-time substitute and impressing in the club's 1–0 win, their first of the league season. His first goal was an equaliser as Leicester beat Manchester United 5–3 at home after trailing 1–3 with 30 minutes to play. Cambiasso scored his second goal of the season, an opener in the fourth minute following an assist from Leonardo Ulloa, in a 3–2 loss against Queens Park Rangers at Loftus Road. That was Leicester's first goal in 504 minutes without scoring, or 56 days. On 4 April 2015, Cambiasso gave Leicester a 12th-minute lead against West Ham United in a game that the Foxes would go on to win 2–1, their first league victory in eight matches, stretching back to 10 January 2015. This started a run of seven wins and one draw from Leicester's final nine Premier League fixtures, with the team finishing 14th in the table.

On 18 May 2015, at Leicester City's annual awards, Cambiasso's impressive performances over the course of the season saw him pick up the Player of the Year award, as voted by the club's supporters. On 24 May, Cambiasso scored in a 5–1 defeat of QPR in Leicester's final match of the Premier League season.

On 21 July 2015, it was announced that Cambiasso had been offered a new deal by the club, but turned the contract down, and he would be leaving the club.

=== Olympiacos ===
On 7 August 2015, Cambiasso signed a two-year deal with Greek giants Olympiacos. He scored his first goal for them on 2 December in a 4–0 away win against Panegialios in the group stage of the Greek Cup. He scored twice in 14 Super League Greece games as the Piraeus-based side retained their title, including the equaliser in a 3–1 home win over Panathinaikos in the Derby of the eternal enemies on 13 March 2016. Eleven days earlier, the first leg of the cup semi-final against PAOK, he scored in a 2–1 away win which was abandoned due to violence by the local fans.

Cambiassio renewed his contract on 11 July 2016. On 9 March 2017, he returned to the starting lineup as a result of the dismissal of Olympiacos manager Paulo Bento against Beşiktaş for the first leg of the UEFA Europa League round of 16 stage, and headed the opening goal of a 1–1 draw, subsequently being named man of the match.

=== Retirement ===
On 8 September 2017, Cambiasso announced his retirement from professional football, two months after his contract with Olympiacos expired. Cambiasso's success in the official UEFA A Licence examinations in Coverciano, subsequently allowing him to take up an assistant role in Serie A or B or head coach role Serie C in the future, influenced his decision to retire from the game.

== International career ==
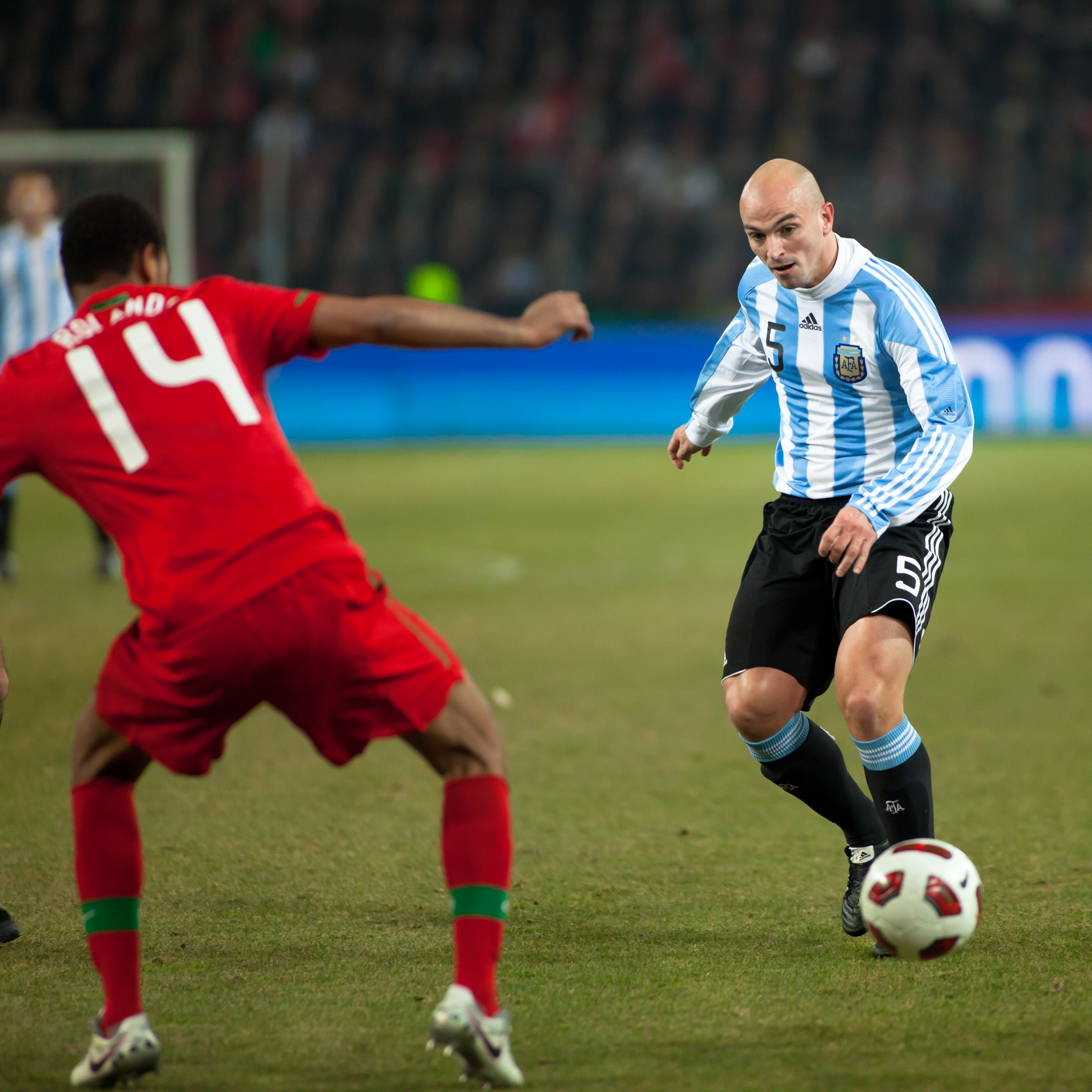
Esteban Cambiasso during a friendly match between Argentina and Portugal in Geneva, Switzerland on 9 February 2011

Cambiasso first represented Argentina in the youth squads, along with national teammates Juan Román Riquelme, Pablo Aimar, Walter Samuel and others. He was in the squads for the 1997 FIFA World Youth Championship, where he scored the first goal in the final even though he was the youngest player on the squad, and captained the team during the 1999 edition.

Cambiasso made his Argentina senior national debut in 2000. He participated in the 2005 FIFA Confederations Cup with his national side, a tournament in which Argentina reached the final. On 15 May 2006, he was named in the Argentina national team for the 2006 World Cup. On 16 June, he capped a 24-pass Argentine interplay with a finish to score the second goal in a 6–0 victory over Serbia and Montenegro. In the quarter-finals match against Germany on 30 June 2006, the match went into penalties, where Cambiasso had his penalty kick saved, resulting in Argentina losing 4–2 and Germany progressing to the semi-final. The following year, he represented his country at the 2007 Copa América, where Argentina reached the final, losing out to South American rivals Brazil.

Since Diego Maradona took over as Argentina coach, Cambiasso was only called-up once to the national team for a friendly game on 14 November 2009 against Spain, despite continuing to play a vital role for Inter in their treble-winning season, and re-affirming his status as one of Europe's best central midfielders. On 12 May 2010, Cambiasso and Inter teammate Javier Zanetti were controversially left out of the 30-man provisional 2010 World Cup squad for Argentina.

On 20 August 2010, new Argentina coach Sergio Batista recalled Cambiasso to the national team for the friendly against newly crowned world champions Spain. Argentina handed Spain their first defeat since becoming world champions the month prior, earning a resounding 4–1 win in a friendly at the Monumental Stadium in Buenos Aires. Cambiasso also played for Argentina in the 2011 Copa América on home soil, where they were eliminated by eventual champions Uruguay, on penalties, in the quarter-finals.

== Style of play ==
Cambiasso was primarily a central midfielder, capable of playing as a defensive or box-to-box midfielder. Cambiasso was also deployed occasionally as a playmaking sweeper. He was left-footed and known for his passing range, tactical intelligence, and ability to distribute the ball and create chances. His role has been likened to that of a metodista, a midfielder who can dictate play while also contributing defensively.

Eurosport said about Cambiasso, when José Mourinho was still managing Inter, "There is nothing glamorous about the bald Argentine, but he is the heartbeat of the Inter side that have become the dominant force in Italian football. Just the kind of determined, hard-running midfielder José Mourinho loves. Originally a destroyer, the 29-year-old has become increasingly adventurous from an offensive standpoint, and weighs in with six to eight goals per season."

Goal said, "All in all, this player is one of the greatest players to have ever pulled an Inter shirt on and to grace the pitch in the Serie A. He is an intelligent midfielder, who has the capacity to change the shape of a game off his own boot. He is one of the most influential midfielders in Italian football, and for that reason and many more, he will certainly be remembered as one of the most talented players of all time." In 2017, Sean Lunt of The Versed pronounced him one of the most under-rated players of the last 15 years.

== Personal life ==
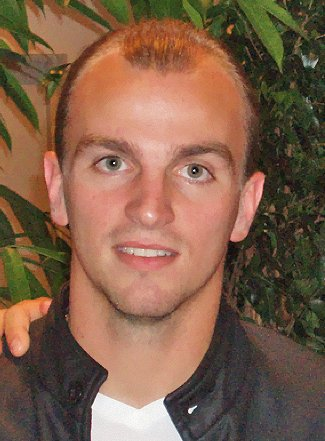
Cambiasso in a picture taken by a fan in 2006

Cambiasso has a daughter and a son. On 22 November 2008, his wife Claudia gave birth to their daughter Victoria before Cambiasso's match for Inter against Juventus. After Inter won the Derby d'Italia, Cambiasso dedicated the win to his daughter. His son Dante was born on 24 September 2013. Two days later, Cambiasso scored a goal against Fiorentina and dedicated it to his family.

== Career statistics ==
=== Club ===
Appearances and goals by club, season and competition
Club	Season	League			National cup (Note: Includes Copa del Rey, Coppa Italia, FA Cup, Greek Football Cup)		Continental		Other		Total	
Club	Season	Division	Apps	Goals	Apps	Goals	Apps	Goals	Apps	Goals	Apps	Goals
Independiente	1998–99	Argentine Primera División	27	3	—		—		—		27	3
Independiente	1999–2000	Argentine Primera División	36	6	—		—		—		36	6
Independiente	2000–01	Argentine Primera División	35	5	—		—		—		35	5
Independiente	Total		98	14	0	0	0	0	0	0	98	14
River Plate	2001–02	Argentine Primera División	37	12	—		—		—		37	12
Real Madrid	2002–03	La Liga	24	0	4	0	9 (Note: Appearances in UEFA Champions League)	0	2 (Note: One appearance in UEFA Super Cup, one appearance in Intercontinental Cup)	0	39	0
Real Madrid	2003–04	La Liga	17	0	4	1	5	0	2 (Note: Appearances in Supercopa de España)	0	28	1
Real Madrid	Total		41	0	8	1	14	0	4	0	67	1
Inter Milan	2004–05	Serie A	30	2	3	0	11	0	—		44	2
Inter Milan	2005–06	Serie A	34	5	3	1	10	0	1 (Note: Appearance in Supercoppa Italiana)	0	48	6
Inter Milan	2006–07	Serie A	21	3	4	1	2	1	1	0	28	5
Inter Milan	2007–08	Serie A	33	6	2	0	8	2	1	0	44	8
Inter Milan	2008–09	Serie A	35	4	3	1	8	0	1	0	47	5
Inter Milan	2009–10	Serie A	30	3	4	0	12	1	1	0	47	4
Inter Milan	2010–11	Serie A	30	7	4	0	7	1	4 (Note: One appearance in Supercoppa Italiana, one appearance in UEFA Super Cup, two appearances in FIFA Club World Cup)	0	45	8
Inter Milan	2011–12	Serie A	37	4	2	0	8	1	0	0	47	5
Inter Milan	2012–13	Serie A	33	3	2	0	13 (Note: Appearances in UEFA Europa League)	1	—		48	4
Inter Milan	2013–14	Serie A	32	4	1	0	—		—		33	4
Inter Milan	Total		315	41	28	3	79	7	9	0	431	51
Leicester City	2014–15	Premier League	31	5	2	0	—		—		33	5
Olympiacos	2015–16	Super League Greece	14	2	3	2	4 (Note: Three appearances in UEFA Champions League, one appearance in UEFA Europa League)	0	—		21	4
Olympiacos	2016–17	Super League Greece	14	0	5	1	9 (Note: One appearance in UEFA Champions League, eight appearances and two goals in UEFA Europa League)	2	—		28	3
Olympiacos	Total		28	2	8	3	13	2	0	0	49	7
Career total			550	74	46	7	106	9	13	0	715	90

=== International ===
Appearances and goals by national team and year
National team	Year	Apps	Goals
Argentina	2000	1	0
Argentina	2001	0	0
Argentina	2002	0	0
Argentina	2003	5	0
Argentina	2004	4	0
Argentina	2005	10	1
Argentina	2006	7	1
Argentina	2007	13	1
Argentina	2008	5	1
Argentina	2009	1	0
Argentina	2010	2	0
Argentina	2011	4	1
Total		52	5

Scores and results list Argentina's goal tally first, score column indicates score after each Cambiasso goal.

List of international goals scored by Esteban Cambiasso
No.	Date	Venue	Opponent	Score	Result	Competition
1.	21 June 2005	Frankenstadion, Nuremberg, Germany	Germany	2–2	2–2	2005 FIFA Confederations Cup
2.	16 June 2006	WM Stadion Gelsenkirchen, Gelsenkirchen, Germany	Serbia and Montenegro	2–0	6–0	2006 FIFA World Cup
3.	5 June 2007	Camp Nou, Barcelona, Spain	Algeria	3–2	4–3	Friendly
4.	10 September 2008	Estadio Monumental "U", Lima, Peru	Peru	1–0	1–1	2010 FIFA World Cup qualifying
5.	26 March 2011	New Meadowlands Stadium, East Rutherford, United States	United States	1–0	1–1	Friendly

== Honours ==
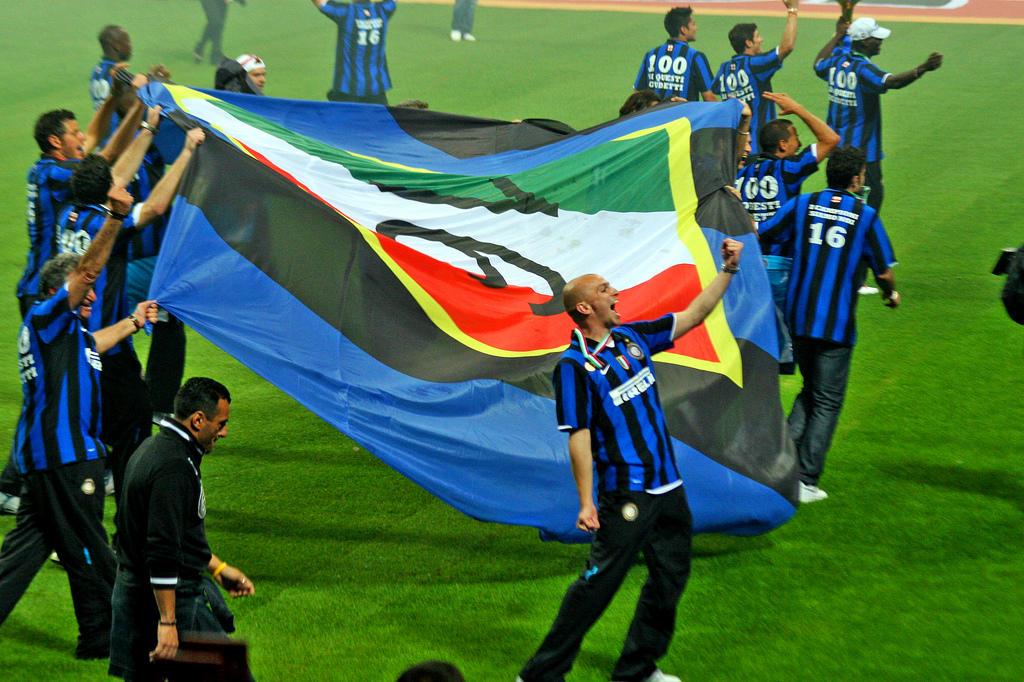
Cambiasso (front) celebrates Inter's 16th Serie A title in 2008

River Plate

- Argentine Primera División: Clausura 2002

Real Madrid

- La Liga: 2002–03
- Supercopa de España: 2003
- UEFA Super Cup: 2002
- Intercontinental Cup: 2002

Inter Milan

- Serie A: 2005–06, 2006–07, 2007–08, 2008–09, 2009–10
- Coppa Italia: 2004–05, 2005–06, 2009–10, 2010–11
- Supercoppa Italiana: 2005, 2006, 2008, 2010
- UEFA Champions League: 2009–10
- FIFA Club World Cup: 2010

Olympiacos

- Super League Greece: 2015–16, 2016–17

Argentina U20

- South American Youth Championship: 1997, 1999
- FIFA World Youth Championship: 1997

Argentina

- Copa América runner-up: 2007
- FIFA Confederations Cup Runner-up: 2005

Individual

- ESM Team of the Year: 2005–06
- Pirata d'Oro (Inter Milan Player of the Year): 2005
- FIFA FIFPro World XI nominee: 2010
- Leicester City Player of the Year: 2014–15
- Inter Milan Hall of Fame: 2020
