= Antonio dos Santos =

Antonio dos Santos may refer to:

- António Carlos dos Santos (born 1979), Brazilian footballer
- Antônio Carlos dos Santos Aguiar (born 1983), Brazilian footballer
- António dos Santos (bishop) (1932–2018), Portuguese Roman Catholic bishop
- António dos Santos (athlete) (born 1964), Angolan Olympic athlete
- António dos Santos (sport shooter) (1876–?), Portuguese sports shooter
- Manuel António dos Santos (born 1943), Portuguese politician
- António Augusto dos Santos (1929–2004), Portuguese General

== See also ==
- Antônio Carlos Santos (born 1964), Brazilian footballer
- Anthony Santos (born 1967), American singer
- Antony Santos (born 1967), bachata musician from the Dominican Republic
- Toninho dos Santos (disambiguation)
