= Miguel Palencia =

Spanish retired footballer (born 1984)

Personal information
- Full name: Miguel Palencia Calvo
- Date of birth: 2 January 1984 (age 42)
- Place of birth: Madrid, Spain
- Height: 1.80 m (5 ft 11 in)
- Position: Right back

Youth career
- 1994–2002: Real Madrid

Senior career*
Years	Team	Apps	(Gls)
2002–2003	Real Madrid C		
2002–2007	Real Madrid B	109	(0)
2005	Real Madrid	2	(0)
2007–2008	Mouscron	1	(0)
2008–2009	Getafe B		
2009–2010	Atlético Ciudad	11	(0)
2010	Las Rozas		
2011	Orihuela	8	(0)
Total		131	(0)

International career
2000–2001	Spain U16	6	(0)
2001	Spain U17	2	(0)
Medal record
Men's Football
Representing Spain
UEFA European Under-16 Championship
Winner	2001 England
- * Club domestic league appearances and goals

Miguel Palencia Calvo (born 2 January 1984) is a Spanish retired footballer who played as a right back.

== Club career ==
Born in Madrid, Palencia joined local Real Madrid at the age of ten. In May 2002, he made his professional debut with the reserves Real Madrid Castilla in Segunda División B, going on to appear in four full seasons with the team.

In the 2004–05 campaign, Palencia played twice with the main squad, his debut coming on 26 February 2005 in a 2–0 La Liga loss at Deportivo de La Coruña. Two weeks later, in another away fixture for the same competition, he appeared against Getafe CF (1–2 defeat) and, in the ensuing summer, left the Santiago Bernabéu Stadium and signed with R.E. Mouscron in Belgium.

After one unassuming season in the Pro League, Palencia returned to Spain, joining Getafe's B-side. In 2009, he moved to CF Atlético Ciudad of the third level, but the club was declared bankrupt in August of the following year.

In early October 2010, Palencia signed with amateurs Las Rozas CF in his hometown, his debut coming on the 14th against UD San Sebastián de los Reyes in the Copa Federación de España's qualifying rounds. In the following transfer window, however, he returned to division three, joining Orihuela CF.

== Honours ==
Spain U16

- UEFA European Under-16 Championship: 2001
