= 2003 Supercopa de España =

Mallorca	Real Madrid
2	4
- on aggregate

First leg
Mallorca	Real Madrid
2	1
- Date: 24 August 2003
- Venue: Son Moix, Palma de Mallorca
- Referee: Alfonso Pérez Burrull
- Attendance: 22,000

Second leg
Real Madrid	Mallorca
3	0
- Date: 27 August 2003
- Venue: Santiago Bernabéu, Madrid
- Referee: Luis Medina Cantalejo
- Attendance: 50,000

The 2003 Supercopa de España was two-legged Spanish football matches played on 24 and 27 August 2003. It contested by Mallorca, who won the 2002–03 Copa del Rey, and Real Madrid, who won the 2002–03 La Liga. Real Madrid won 4–2 on aggregate.

== Match details ==
=== First leg ===
24 August 2003
21:45 CET

Mallorca	2–1	Real Madrid
Bruggink 45'; Eto'o 48'	Report	Figo 18'

Son Moix, Palma de Mallorca
Attendance: 22,000
Referee: Alfonso Pérez Burrull

Mallorca	Real Madrid

GK	25	(Argentina) Leo Franco
RB	8	(Spain) David Cortés
CB	20	(Spain) Miguel Ángel Nadal
CB	5	(Spain) Fernando Niño
LB	16	(Spain) Poli
DM	18	(Spain) Marcos
RM	2	(Spain) Alejandro Campano	(substituted off) 64'
LM	28	(Spain) Toni González	(substituted off) 61'
AM	10	(Argentina) Ariel Ibagaza
CF	17	(Netherlands) Arnold Bruggink	(substituted off) 76'
CF	9	(Cameroon) Samuel Eto'o (c)
Substitutes:
GK	13	(Spain) Miki
MF	3	(Spain) Txomin Nagore	(substituted on) 61'
MF	11	(Serbia and Montenegro) Jovan Stanković	(substituted on) 64'
MF	21	(Spain) Vicente Fernández
FW	19	(Spain) Jesús Perera	(substituted on) 76'
Manager:
(Portugal) Jaime Pacheco

GK	1	(Spain) Iker Casillas
RB	2	(Spain) Míchel Salgado
CB	6	(Spain) Iván Helguera
CB	22	(Spain) Francisco Pavón	(yellow card) 35'	(substituted off) 53'
LB	3	(Brazil) Roberto Carlos
DM	19	(Argentina) Esteban Cambiasso		(substituted off) 74'
RM	23	(England) David Beckham		(substituted off) 53'
LM	10	(Portugal) Luís Figo
AM	5	(France) Zinedine Zidane	(yellow card) 69'
CF	7	(Spain) Raúl (c)
CF	11	(Brazil) Ronaldo	(yellow card) 30'
Substitutes:
GK	25	(Spain) César Sánchez
DF	15	(Spain) Raúl Bravo		(substituted on) 53'
MF	24	(France) Claude Makélélé		(substituted on) 53'
MF	14	(Spain) Guti		(substituted on) 74'
FW	18	(Spain) Javier Portillo
Manager:
(Portugal) Carlos Queiroz

=== Second leg ===
27 August 2003
21:45 CET

Real Madrid	3–0	Mallorca
Raúl 44'; Ronaldo 52'; Beckham 73'	Report

Santiago Bernabéu, Madrid
Attendance: 50,000
Referee: Luis Medina Cantalejo

Real Madrid	Mallorca

GK	1	(Spain) Iker Casillas
RB	2	(Spain) Míchel Salgado
CB	6	(Spain) Iván Helguera
CB	15	(Spain) Raúl Bravo
LB	3	(Brazil) Roberto Carlos
DM	19	(Argentina) Esteban Cambiasso
RM	23	(England) David Beckham
LM	10	(Portugal) Luís Figo	(substituted off) 89'
AM	5	(France) Zinedine Zidane
CF	7	(Spain) Raúl (c)	(substituted off) 70'
CF	11	(Brazil) Ronaldo
Substitutes:
GK	25	(Spain) César Sánchez
DF	4	(Spain) Rubén
MF	14	(Spain) Guti	(substituted on) 70' (substituted off) 86'
MF	21	(Argentina) Santiago Solari	(substituted on) 89'
FW	18	(Spain) Javier Portillo	(substituted on) 86'
Manager:
(Portugal) Carlos Queiroz

GK	25	(Argentina) Leo Franco
RB	8	(Spain) David Cortés
CB	20	(Spain) Miguel Ángel Nadal
CB	5	(Spain) Fernando Niño	(yellow card) 39'	(substituted off) 75'
LB	16	(Spain) Poli
DM	18	(Spain) Marcos		(substituted off) 86'
RM	2	(Spain) Alejandro Campano		(substituted off) 56'
LM	28	(Spain) Toni González
AM	10	(Argentina) Ariel Ibagaza	(yellow card) 12'
CF	17	(Netherlands) Arnold Bruggink
CF	9	(Cameroon) Samuel Eto'o (c)	(yellow card) 45'
Substitutes:
GK	30	(Spain) Alberto
MF	3	(Spain) Txomin Nagore		(substituted on) 86'
MF	11	(Serbia and Montenegro) Jovan Stanković		(substituted on) 75'
MF	21	(Spain) Vicente Fernández
FW	19	(Spain) Jesús Perera		(substituted on) 56'
Manager:
(Portugal) Jaime Pacheco

== See also ==
- 2003–04 La Liga
- 2003–04 Copa del Rey
- 2003–04 FC Barcelona season
