= Fernando Sales =

Spanish footballer

Personal information
- Full name: Fernando Sales de los Cobos
- Date of birth: 12 September 1977 (age 49)
- Place of birth: Seville, Spain
- Height: 1.71 m (5 ft 7 in)
- Position: Midfielder

Youth career
- Betis

Senior career*
Years	Team	Apps	(Gls)
1996–1997	Betis B	0	(0)
1997	→ Los Palacios (loan)		
1997–1998	Isla Cristina	36	(9)
1998–2000	Levante	72	(14)
2000–2004	Valladolid	131	(17)
2004–2007	Sevilla	28	(1)
2008	Celta	13	(0)
2008–2009	Hércules	24	(2)
2009–2010	Albacete	35	(5)
2010–2014	Alcorcón	149	(12)
2014–2015	S.S. Reyes		
Total		488	(60)
- * Club domestic league appearances and goals

Fernando Sales de los Cobos (born 12 September 1977) is a Spanish former professional footballer who played as a right midfielder.

== Club career ==
Sales was born in Seville, Andalusia. A product of local Real Betis' youth system, he first appeared professionally with lowly CD Isla Cristina and Levante UD (then in the Segunda División B, achieving promotion in his first year).

After making his La Liga debut with Real Valladolid in the 2000–01 season, in a 1–1 away draw against UD Las Palmas, being an undisputed starter in the following three years while scoring a total of 15 league goals, Sales transferred to Sevilla FC on a five-year contract, upon Valladolid's 2004 relegation. He appeared sporadically for his new club during his first two campaigns, being restricted to Copa del Rey games in the 2006–07 campaign and not registered at all – alongside teammate Jesuli – in the following season.

On 13 January 2008, Sales moved to RC Celta de Vigo on a free transfer. In September, he signed a one-year deal with another Segunda División side, Hércules CF, being reunited with his former Valladolid teammate Tote.

Veteran Sales continued playing in the second tier the following years, with Albacete Balompié and AD Alcorcón.

== Honours ==
Sevilla

- Copa del Rey: 2006–07
- UEFA Cup: 2005–06, 2006–07
