= Juanjo Olalla =

Spanish footballer

Personal information
- Full name: Juan José Olalla Fernández
- Date of birth: 13 January 1980 (age 46)
- Place of birth: Madrid, Spain
- Height: 1.82 m (6 ft 0 in)
- Position: Defender

Youth career
- Real Madrid

Senior career*
Years	Team	Apps	(Gls)
2000–2005	Real Madrid B	99	(0)
2003–2005	Real Madrid	0	(0)
2004–2005	→ Lleida (loan)	12	(0)
2005–2006	Rayo Vallecano	33	(0)
2006–2007	Figueres	17	(1)
2007–2008	Castelldefels	31	(1)
2008–2009	Ibiza-Eivissa	14	(0)
2011–2012	Puerta Bonita		
2012–2013	Carabanchel	1+	(0+)
2013–2014	Torrelodones		
2015	Collado Villalba		
2016–2017	Las Rozas		
2017–2020	Aravaca	55+	(5+)
2020–2021	Collado Villalba		
- * Club domestic league appearances and goals as of 8 November 2021

Juan José Olalla Fernández (born 13 January 1980) is a former Spanish professional footballer who played as a defender.

== Career ==
Born in Madrid, Olalla finished his youth career with Real Madrid CF, making his senior debut in the 2000–01 season with the reserves in Segunda División B. On 6 November 2002, he made his main-squad and Copa del Rey debut, coming on as a substitute of Santiago Solari in a 4–0 away win against Real Oviedo. He was choiced from Real Madrid B by Carlos Queiroz for main team 2003–04 Champions League campaign, but did not play a single match in this tournament. On 2004-05 season, Olalla was loaned to UE Lleida of the second division. Olalla made his Segunda División debut on 27 February 2005 as a starting central defender against Polideportivo Ejido.

Since the 2005-06 season Olalla played at a third level of Spanish football system and below. His last team was CU Collado Villalba, for which he played in the 2020-21 season.
