= Javier Portillo (Spanish footballer) =

Spanish former footballer (born 1982)

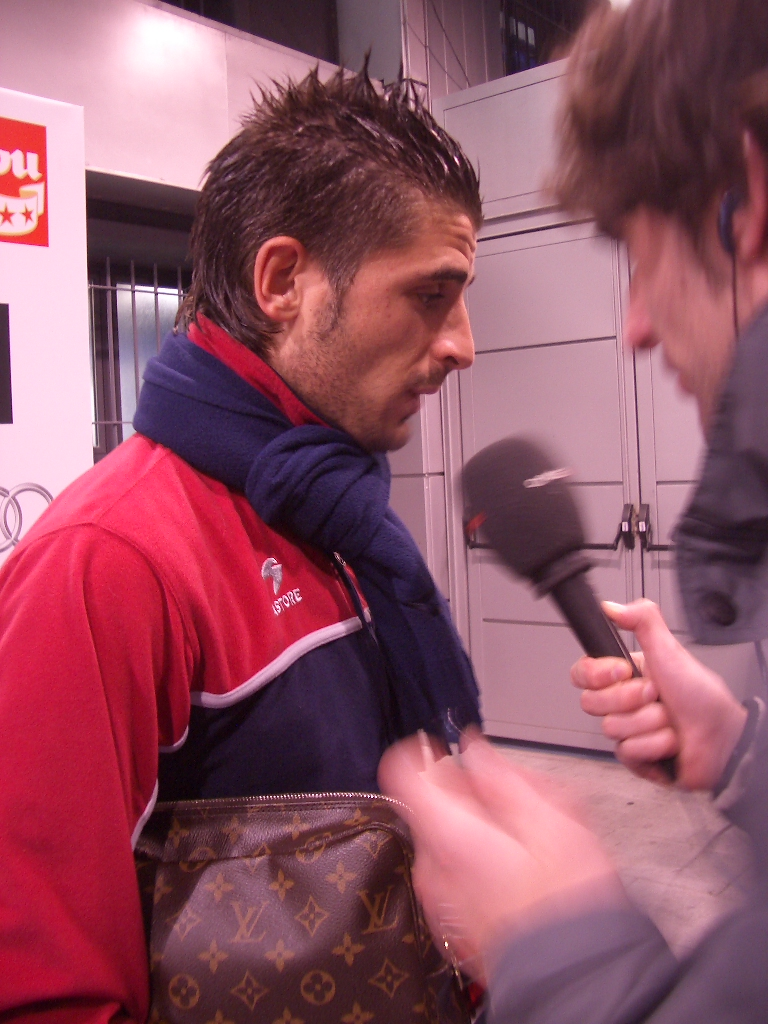
- Portillo in 2003

Personal information
- Full name: Javier García Portillo
- Date of birth: 30 March 1982 (age 44)
- Place of birth: Aranjuez, Spain
- Height: 1.80 m (5 ft 11 in)
- Position: Forward

Youth career
- 1994–2001: Real Madrid

Senior career*
| Years | Team | Apps | (Gls) |
| 2001–2002 | Real Madrid B | 23 | (15) |
| 2002–2006 | Real Madrid | 31 | (6) |
| 2004 | → Fiorentina (loan) | 11 | (1) |
| 2005–2006 | → Club Brugge (loan) | 24 | (8) |
| 2006–2007 | Gimnàstic | 34 | (11) |
| 2007–2009 | Osasuna | 40 | (3) |
| 2010–2011 | Hércules | 42 | (6) |
| 2011–2012 | Las Palmas | 34 | (8) |
| 2012–2015 | Hércules | 124 | (36) |
| Total | | 363 | (94) |

International career
| 2002–2003 | Spain U21 | 10 | (5) |
- * Club domestic league appearances and goals

Javier García Portillo (born 30 March 1982) is a Spanish former professional footballer who played as a forward.

He started out at Real Madrid and appeared in 59 competitive games during his tenure, scoring 17 goals. In La Liga, he also played for Gimnàstic, Osasuna and Hércules for a total of 131 matches and 21 goals, and also competed professionally in Italy and Belgium.

In a 14-year senior career, Portillo represented Hércules in all three major levels of Spanish football.

== Club career ==
Portillo was born in Aranjuez, Community of Madrid. In 1994, aged 12, he entered Real Madrid's youth system. Over seven seasons he was a prolific scorer, netting 370 goals and breaking a record previously held by Raúl. In August 2002, he signed his first professional contract, running until 2006 with a buyout clause of €15 million.

On 6 October 2002, Portillo made his first La Liga appearance and second overall for the main squad, starting in a 5–2 home win over Alavés and ending that season with five goals in only ten games. He also scored a vital last-minute equaliser against Borussia Dortmund in the UEFA Champions League second group phase, a goal which ultimately proved to be crucial to reach the knockout stages.

Portillo was loaned to Serie A side Fiorentina in July 2004, but was recalled by new manager Vanderlei Luxemburgo, who arrived midway through the 2004–05 campaign. However, the same coach deemed him surplus to requirements and another loan ensued, to Club Brugge of the Belgian Pro League.

At the end of this loan period, Portillo returned to Real under newly hired coach Fabio Capello. With new signing Ruud van Nistelrooy adding to already present Raúl, Antonio Cassano and Ronaldo, he was released and signed a two-year contract with recently promoted Gimnàstic de Tarragona.

After a successful individual season (12 goals in all competitions, although the Catalans were relegated from the top flight), in July 2007 Portillo replaced at Osasuna Roberto Soldado, who returned from loan to Real Madrid. He was used irregularly in his first two years, and only netted three times in the league.

In late December 2009, Portillo – who was only fourth or fifth-choice striker for Osasuna coach José Antonio Camacho– finally moved clubs, signing until the end of the season plus two more with Segunda División's Hércules. After some time to adjust he finished in the starting XI, netting vital goals in the final stretch, including one in the last round for a 2–0 victory at Real Unión as the Alicante side returned to the first division after 13 years.

Portillo returned to reserve status in 2010–11, after Hércules signed David Trezeguet and Nelson Valdez in the off-season. He only started through injury or suspension to the pair, and scored just twice in official matches, one coming in a 3–1 away defeat of Real Sociedad on 3 April 2011, with Hércules being immediately relegated.

On 2 August 2011, Portillo signed for three years with Las Palmas in the second tier. For the 2012–13 season, however, he moved teams again, returning to Hércules on a three-year deal.

In late December 2015, Portillo announced his retirement at the age of 33. Subsequently, he worked as his last club's director of football.

== International career ==
Making his debut in 2002 – shortly after his arrival at the Real Madrid senior setup – Portillo played ten times for Spain under-21s, and scored five goals.

== Career statistics ==
Appearances and goals by club, season and competition
| Club | Season | League | | | Cup | | Continental | | Other | | Total | |
| Club | Season | Division | Apps | Goals | Apps | Goals | Apps | Goals | Apps | Goals | Apps | Goals |
|---|---|---|---|---|---|---|---|---|---|---|---|---|
| Real Madrid | 2001–02 | La Liga | 0 | 0 | 0 | 0 | 1 | 1 | – | | 1 | 1 |
| Real Madrid | 2002–03 | La Liga | 10 | 5 | 6 | 8 | 7 | 1 | 1 (Note: Appearance in UEFA Super Cup) | 0 | 24 | 14 |
| Real Madrid | 2003–04 | La Liga | 18 | 1 | 7 | 1 | 4 | 0 | 1 (Note: Appearance in Supercopa de España) | 0 | 30 | 2 |
| Real Madrid | 2004–05 | La Liga | 3 | 0 | 1 | 0 | 0 | 0 | – | | 4 | 0 |
| Real Madrid | total | | 31 | 6 | 14 | 9 | 12 | 2 | 2 | 0 | 59 | 17 |
| Real Madrid B | 2001–02 | Segunda División B | 23 | 15 | 0 | 0 | – | | – | | 23 | 15 |
| Fiorentina (loan) | 2004–05 | Serie A | 11 | 1 | 7 | 3 | 0 | 0 | – | | 18 | 4 |
| Club Brugge (loan) | 2005–06 | Belgian Pro League | 24 | 8 | 0 | 0 | 8 | 3 | – | | 32 | 11 |
| Gimnàstic | 2006–07 | La Liga | 34 | 11 | 2 | 1 | 0 | 0 | – | | 36 | 12 |
| Osasuna | 2007–08 | La Liga | 18 | 2 | 2 | 0 | 0 | 0 | – | | 20 | 2 |
| Osasuna | 2008–09 | La Liga | 20 | 1 | 2 | 0 | 0 | 0 | – | | 22 | 1 |
| Osasuna | 2009–10 | La Liga | 2 | 0 | 1 | 0 | 0 | 0 | – | | 3 | 0 |
| Osasuna | total | | 40 | 3 | 5 | 0 | 0 | 0 | 0 | 0 | 45 | 3 |
| Hércules | 2009–10 | Segunda División | 16 | 5 | 2 | 0 | 0 | 0 | – | | 18 | 6 |
| Hércules | 2010–11 | La Liga | 26 | 1 | 2 | 1 | 0 | 0 | – | | 28 | 2 |
| Hércules | total | | 42 | 6 | 4 | 1 | 0 | 0 | 0 | 0 | 46 | 7 |
| Las Palmas | 2011–12 | Segunda División | 34 | 8 | 1 | 0 | 0 | 0 | – | | 35 | 8 |
| Hércules | 2012–13 | Segunda División | 40 | 17 | 1 | 0 | 0 | 0 | – | | 41 | 17 |
| Hércules | 2013–14 | Segunda División | 38 | 10 | 0 | 0 | 0 | 0 | – | | 38 | 10 |
| Hércules | 2014–15 | Segunda División B | 33 | 9 | 1 | 1 | 0 | 0 | – | | 34 | 10 |
| Hércules | 2015–16 | Segunda División B | 13 | 0 | 1 | 0 | 0 | 0 | – | | 14 | 0 |
| Hércules | total | | 124 | 36 | 3 | 1 | 0 | 0 | 0 | 0 | 127 | 37 |
| Career total | | | 363 | 94 | 36 | 15 | 20 | 5 | 2 | 0 | 421 | 114 |

== Honours ==
Real Madrid

- La Liga: 2002–03
- Supercopa de España: 2003
- UEFA Champions League: 2001–02
- UEFA Super Cup: 2002

Individual

- Copa del Rey top scorer: 2002–03 (8 goals)
