= Juan Carlos Duque =

Spanish footballer and manager

Personal information
- Full name: Juan Carlos Duque Gancedo
- Date of birth: 26 January 1982 (age 44)
- Place of birth: Madrid, Spain
- Height: 1.74 m (5 ft 9 in)
- Position: Defender

Youth career
- Real Madrid

Senior career*
Years	Team	Apps	(Gls)
2002–2003	Real Madrid C		
2003–2006	Real Madrid B	33	(0)
2006–2007	Zamora	29	(2)
2007–2008	Pontevedra	31	(0)
2009	Ceuta	9	(0)
2009–2010	Zamora	32	(2)
2010–2011	Poli Ejido	36	(0)
2011–2012	S.S. Reyes	23	(2)
Total		193	(6)

International career
1999	Spain U16	4	(0)
1999	Spain U17	3	(0)

Managerial career
- 2012–2013: Miraflor
Medal record
Representing Spain
UEFA European Under-16 Championship
Winner	1999 Czech Republic
- * Club domestic league appearances and goals

Juan Carlos Duque Gancedo (born 26 January 1982 in Madrid) is a Spanish retired footballer who played as a defender, and a current manager.

== Honours ==
Spain U16

- UEFA European Under-16 Football Championship: 1999
