= Carlos Sánchez (footballer, born 1978) =

Spanish footballer

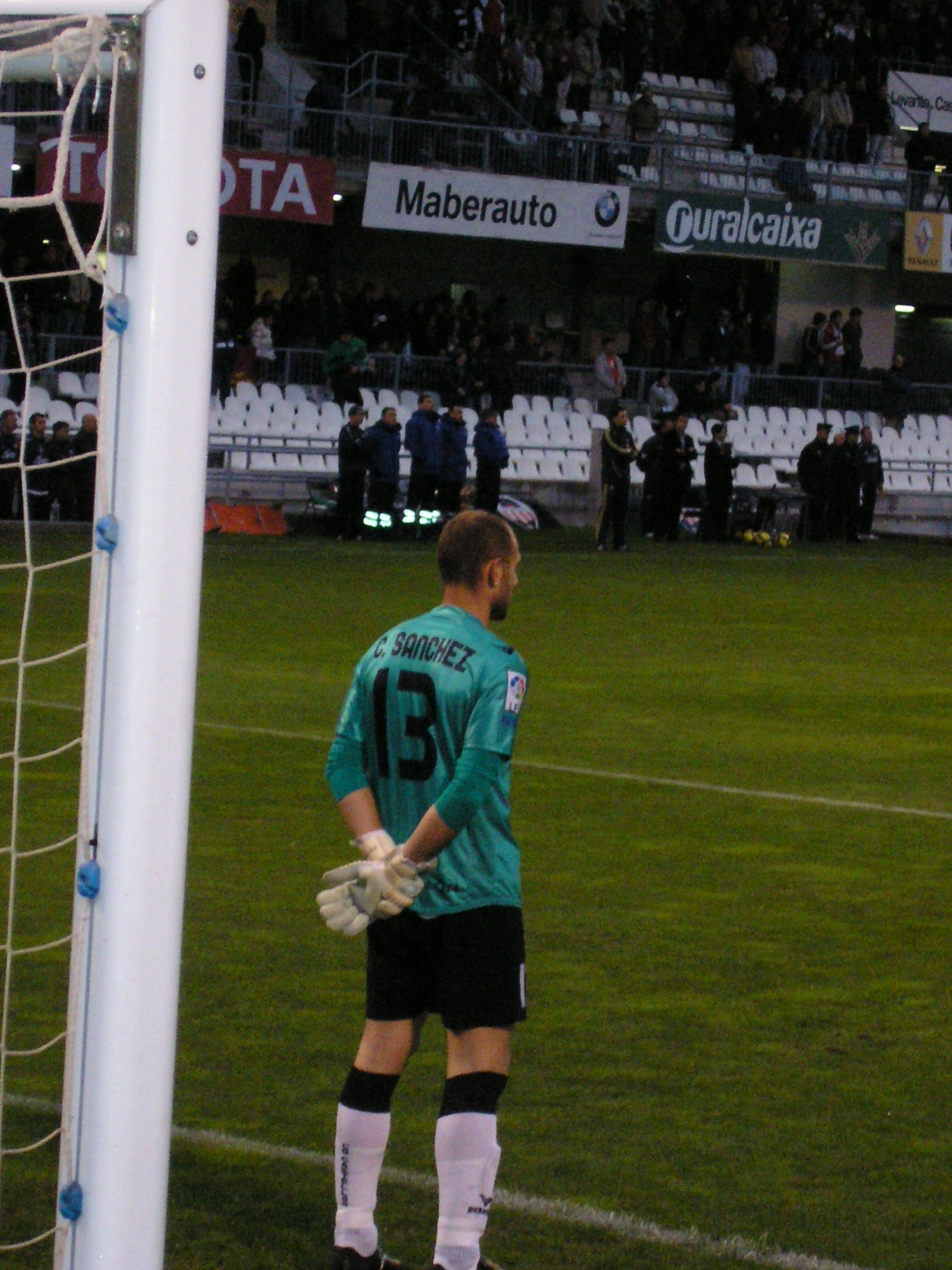
- Sánchez with Castellón in 2010

Personal information
- Full name: Carlos Sánchez García
- Date of birth: 19 January 1978 (age 48)
- Place of birth: Madrid, Spain
- Height: 1.84 m (6 ft 1/2 in)
- Position: Goalkeeper

Youth career
- Leganés

Senior career*
Years	Team	Apps	(Gls)
1997–1999	Leganés B	8	(0)
1999–2000	Real Madrid C	23	(0)
2000–2003	Real Madrid B	97	(0)
2001–2006	Real Madrid	1	(0)
2004–2005	→ Poli Ejido (loan)	5	(0)
2005–2006	→ Almería (loan)	3	(0)
2006–2010	Castellón	75	(0)
2010–2011	Puerta Bonita	34	(0)
Total		246	(0)
- * Club domestic league appearances and goals

Carlos Sánchez García (born 19 January 1978) is a Spanish former professional footballer who played as a goalkeeper.

== Club career ==
A graduate of local CD Leganés' youth system, Madrid-born Sánchez signed with La Liga giants Real Madrid in 1999, being first-choice for both its B and C sides. Benefitting from forced absences to Iker Casillas and César Sánchez he appeared once for the first team, a 1–1 away draw against RCD Mallorca on 23 December 2001.

Nothing more than a third-string player for the club, Sánchez would be loaned from 2004 to 2006, spending two seasons in the Segunda División with Polideportivo Ejido and UD Almería, both in Andalusia, where he also featured very rarely.

However, for the 2006–07 campaign, already a free agent, Sánchez joined another team at that level, CD Castellón, and was an undisputed starter in his second year as they finished fifth. He was also awarded the Ricardo Zamora Trophy for the category, after only 27 goals conceded in 33 games.

In the summer of 2010, following Castellón's relegation, the 32-year-old Carlos returned to the Community of Madrid, signing with amateurs CD Puerta Bonita. After retiring, he worked as a goalkeeper coach at CD Leganés.
