= Chema (footballer, born 1976) =

Spanish footballer

Personal information
- Full name: José Manuel Jiménez Sancho
- Date of birth: 9 May 1976 (age 50)
- Place of birth: Pamplona, Spain
- Height: 1.70 m (5 ft 7 in)
- Position: Midfielder

Youth career
- 1991–1994: Osasuna

Senior career*
Years	Team	Apps	(Gls)
1994–1995	Tudelano	36	(4)
1995–1997	Atlético Madrid B	69	(11)
1997–2007	Valladolid	236	(9)
2007–2010	Cultural Leonesa	102	(9)
2010–2013	Guijuelo	93	(4)
Total		536	(37)
- * Club domestic league appearances and goals

José Manuel Jiménez Sancho (born 9 May 1976), known as Chema, is a Spanish former professional footballer who played as a right midfielder.

== Club career ==
Chema was born in Pamplona, Navarre. After an unsuccessful stint with Atlético Madrid (he only represented their reserves) he signed for Real Valladolid in 1997, going on to make 264 competitive appearances for the Castile and León side. He also played a good number of games as an attacking right-back, and made his La Liga debut on 18 October 1997 by featuring the full 90 minutes in a 1–1 home draw against Sporting de Gijón.

In the 2006–07 season, Chema helped the team return to the top flight after a three-year absence, contributing 13 matches. He was released in June 2007 and joined neighbouring Cultural y Deportiva Leonesa in the Segunda División B, having three solid campaigns and being released at the age of 34, following which he moved to another club in that tier and region, CD Guijuelo.

== Honours ==
Valladolid

- Segunda División: 2006–07
