= Tote (footballer) =

Spanish footballer (born 1978)

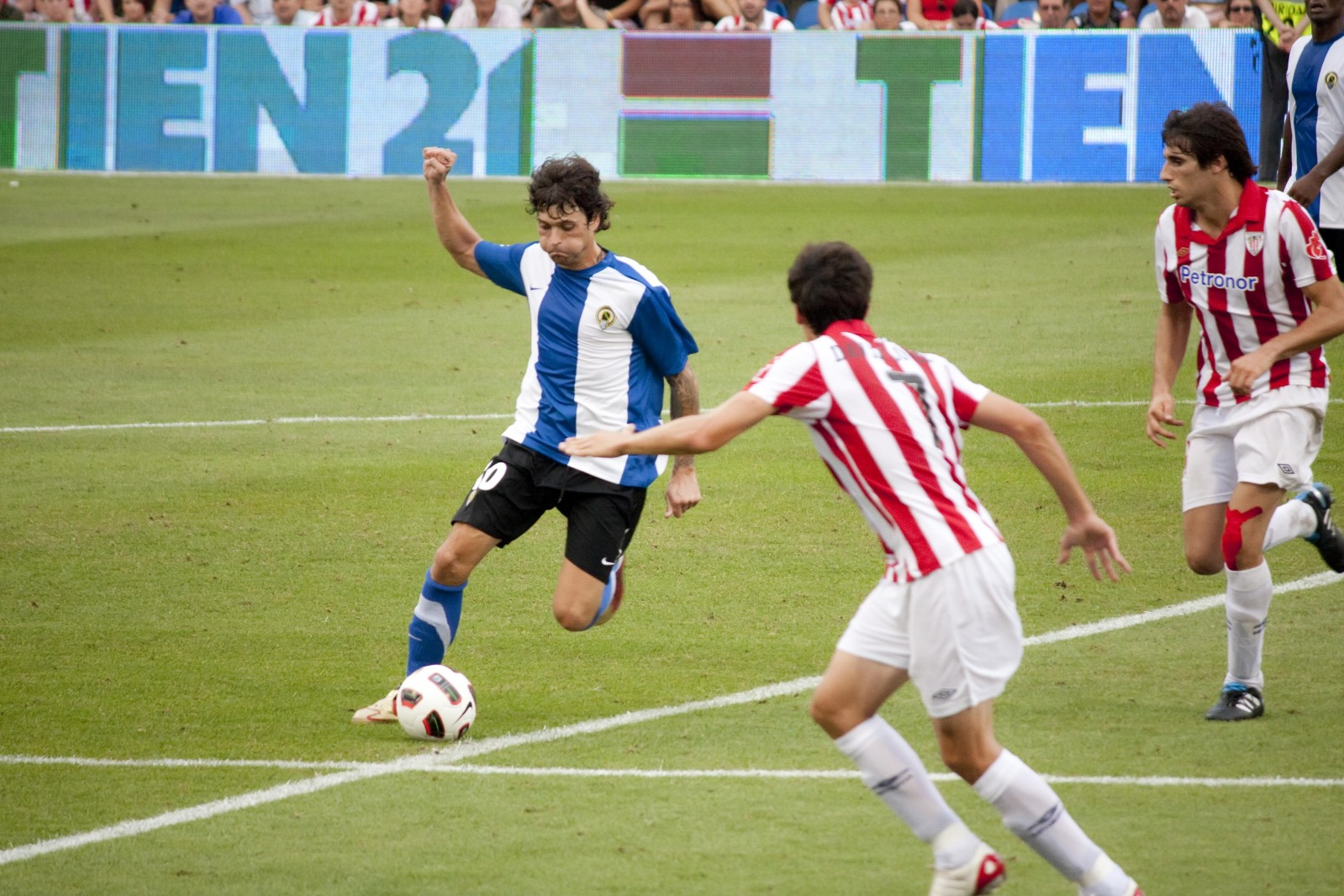
- Tote with Hércules in 2010

Personal information
- Full name: Jorge López Marco
- Date of birth: 23 November 1978 (age 47)
- Place of birth: Madrid, Spain
- Height: 1.75 m (5 ft 9 in)
- Position: Forward

Youth career
- 1986–1987: Los Yébenes
- 1987–1993: Atlético Madrid
- 1993–1997: Real Madrid

Senior career*
Years	Team	Apps	(Gls)
1997–1998	Real Madrid C	30	(20)
1998–1999	Real Madrid B	24	(3)
1999–2003	Real Madrid	5	(0)
1999–2000	→ Benfica (loan)	7	(0)
2001–2002	→ Valladolid (loan)	36	(7)
2003–2005	Betis	17	(2)
2005	→ Málaga (loan)	9	(0)
2005–2006	Valladolid	30	(3)
2006–2012	Hércules	178	(29)
Total		336	(64)
- * Club domestic league appearances and goals

Jorge López Marco (born 23 November 1978), known as Tote, is a Spanish former professional footballer who played as a forward.

He amassed Segunda División totals of 187 games and 31 goals over the course of six seasons, almost exclusively with Hércules. In La Liga, he appeared for Real Madrid, Valladolid, Betis, Málaga and Hércules, adding 88 matches and ten goals in a 15-year career.

== Club career ==
Tote was born in Madrid. He began his football development with Atlético Madrid, moving crosstown in 1993 to join Real Madrid's academy. Playing mainly with its B side after starting out at Real Madrid C, he was handed his first-team debut on 8 May 1999, as a late substitute in a 3–2 away loss against Real Sociedad.

Following an unsuccessful loan stint in Portugal with S.L. Benfica, Tote was definitely promoted to the main squad, but only appeared in three games during the season as Real were crowned champions. He was again loaned for 2001–02, now to Real Valladolid, and developed into a La Liga player, scoring his first goal against Málaga CF on 16 September 2001 (2–1 away win); one month later, he added a hat-trick in a 4–1 victory at Athletic Bilbao.

Returning to Real, Tote only made one league appearance, at Recreativo de Huelva (he did score five goals in the 2002–03 Copa del Rey and one in the same edition of the UEFA Champions League, in a 1–1 draw away to KRC Genk), being subsequently transferred to Real Betis on a five-year contract. Injuries and loss of form soon made him surplus to requirements and, during the 2005 January transfer window, he was loaned to neighbouring Málaga, where he failed to produce.

After a quick return spell with Valladolid, Tote signed a two-year deal with another Segunda División club, Hércules CF. In the 2009–10 campaign, he contributed four goals in 35 matches (2,439 minutes) as the Alicante team returned to the top flight after 13 years.

In early March 2011, during the second half of an eventual 1–2 home defeat against UD Almería, Tote suffered a severe knee injury from which he never fully recovered. Hércules were eventually relegated as 19th, and he retired in summer 2012 at the age of 33 as his contract was not renewed.

== Honours ==
Real Madrid

- La Liga: 2000–01, 2002–03
