= 2013–14 Real Madrid Castilla season =

Real Madrid Castilla
2013–14 season
- President: Nicolás Martín-Sanz
- Manager: Alberto Toril (until 19 November); Manolo Díaz (from 19 November)
- Stadium: Alfredo Di Stéfano
- Segunda División: 20th (relegated)
Home colours	Away colours	Third colours

The 2013–14 season will be the 42nd season in Real Madrid Castilla's history (since its establishment in 1972) and their 2nd consecutive season (22nd overall) in the Segunda División, the second division of Spanish football. It covers a period from 1 July 2013 to 30 June 2014.

== Season overview ==
=== Pre-season ===
Real Madrid Castilla started the summer with key players leaving the team. On 10 June, Real Madrid announced the signing of former loanee Casemiro from São Paulo for €6 million.

On 13 June, Juanfran signed with Real Betis on a free transfer.

On 30 June, loanees Pedro Mosquera, Jota and Fabinho were returned to Getafe, Celta de Vigo and Rio Ave respectively.

On 5 July, José Antonio Ríos signed with Mirandés on a free transfer.

On 10 July, Real Madrid agreed a four-year contract extension with Nacho.

On 18 July, Real Madrid Castilla announced its first signing of the season in Jorge Pulido from Atlético Madrid.

On 24 July, Real Madrid agreed a four-year contract extension with Jesé.

On 25 July, Real Madrid agreed a four-year contract extension with Denis Cheryshev.

On 27 July, Real Madrid Castilla received Jaime Romero from Udinese on loan.

== Players ==
=== Squad information ===
Squad No.	Nationality	Name	Date of birth (age)	Signed from	Transfer fee	Signed in	Contract ends	Apps.	Goals
Goalkeepers
1	(Spain)	Fernando Pacheco	May 18, 1992 (aged 22)	Real Madrid C	Promoted	2012	2014	2	0
25	(Spain)	Rubén Yáñez	October 12, 1993 (aged 20)	Real Madrid C	Promoted	2013	2016	0	0
Defenders
2	(Spain)	Diego Llorente (vc)	August 16, 1993 (aged 20)	Real Madrid C	Promoted	2013	2014	1	0
3	(Spain)	Jorge Casado (c)	June 26, 1989 (aged 25)	Rayo Vallecano	N/A	2010	2016	132	7
14	(Spain)	Derik	February 21, 1993 (aged 21)	Real Madrid C	Promoted	2012	2015	11	0
18	(Spain)	Jorge Pulido	April 8, 1991 (aged 23)	Atlético Madrid	N/A	2013	2014	0	0
23	(Spain)	Javi Noblejas	March 18, 1993 (aged 21)	Real Madrid C	Promoted	2013	2016	0	0
Midfielders
5	(Spain)	Omar Mascarell	February 2, 1993 (aged 21)	Real Madrid C	Promoted	2011	2018	44	4
6	(Spain)	José Rodríguez	December 16, 1994 (aged 19)	Juvenil A	Promoted	2012	2017	27	0
7	(Spain)	Lucas Vázquez (vc)	July 1, 1991 (aged 22)	Real Madrid C	Promoted	2011	2017	49	7
8	(Spain)	Cristian Gómez	27 July 1989 (aged 24)	Espanyol	N/A	2013	2014	0	0
10	(Spain)	Borja García	November 2, 1990 (aged 23)	Córdoba CF	€1.3 million	2012	2016	41	9
15	(Spain)	Kiko Femenía	February 2, 1991 (aged 23)	Barcelona B	N/A	2013	2014	0	0
16	(Spain)	Sergio Aguza	September 2, 1992 (aged 21)	Real Madrid C	Promoted	2013	2014	0	0
20	(Spain)	Jaime Romero	July 31, 1990 (aged 23)	Udinese	Loan	2013	2014	0	0
22	(Equatorial Guinea)	Rubén Belima	February 11, 1992 (aged 22)	Real Madrid C	Promoted	2013	2016	0	0
30	(Peru)	Cristian	May 19, 1994 (aged 20)	Juvenil A	Promoted	2013	2017	0	0
Forwards
11	(Italy)	Antonio Rozzi	May 28, 1994 (aged 20)	Lazio	Loan	2013	2014	0	0
17	(Spain)	Quini	September 24, 1989 (aged 24)	Lucena	N/A	2012	2014	9	0
19	(Spain)	Rubén Sobrino	June 1, 1992 (aged 22)	Real Madrid C	Promoted	2013	2016	1	0
21	(Spain)	Burgui	October 29, 1993 (aged 20)	Real Madrid C	Promoted	2013	2017	1	0
28	(Spain)	Raúl de Tomás	October 17, 1994 (aged 19)	Real Madrid C	Promoted	2013	2017	0	0
4	(Brazil)	Willian José	November 23, 1991 (aged 22)	Deportivo Maldonado	Loan	2014	2014	0	0
9	(Brazil)	Pablo	July 23, 1992 (aged 21)	Athletico Paranaense	Loan	2014	2014	0	0

=== In ===
No.	Pos.	Nat.	Name	Age	EU	Moving from	Type	Transfer window	Ends	Transfer fee	Source
	MF	(Spain)	Antonio Martínez	23	EU	Mirandés	Loan return	Summer	2014	N/A	
	CB	(Spain)	Jorge Pulido	22	EU	Atlético Madrid	Transfer	Summer	2014	Free	Real Madrid C.F.
	MF	(Spain)	Jaime Romero	22	EU	Udinese	Loan	Summer	2014	N/A	Marca.com
	MF	(Brazil)	Willian José	22	EU	Deportivo Maldonado	Loan	Winter	2014	N/A	

=== Out ===
No.	Pos.	Nat.	Name	Age	EU	Moving to	Type	Transfer window	Transfer fee	Source
18	CM	(Brazil)	Casemiro	21	Non-EU	Real Madrid	Transfer	Summer	€6M	Real Madrid C.F.
2	RW	(Spain)	Juanfran	24	EU	Betis	Transfer	Summer	Free	Real Betis
20	RB	(Brazil)	Fabinho	19	Non-EU	Rio Ave (Portugal)	Loan return	Summer	N/A	
14	MF	(Spain)	Jota	22	EU	Celta Vigo	Loan return	Summer	N/A	
11	CM	(Spain)	Pedro Mosquera	25	EU	Getafe	Loan return	Summer	N/A	
5	DF	(Spain)	Iván González	25	EU	Erzgebirge Aue (Germany)	End of contract	Summer	N/A	
23	LB	(Spain)	José Antonio Ríos	23	EU	Mirandés	Transfer	Summer	Free	CD Mirandés
13	GK	(Spain)	Andrés	19	EU	Real Madrid C	Demoted	Summer	N/A	
10	LW	(Spain)	Jesé	20	EU	Real Madrid	Promoted	Summer	N/A	
17	LW	(Russia)	Denis Cheryshev	22	EU	Real Madrid	Promoted	Summer	N/A	
	GK	(Spain)	Javi Olmedo	19	EU	Toledo	Loan	Summer	N/A	CD Toledo
24	GK	(Spain)	Tomás Mejías	25	EU	Middlesbrough (England)	Loan	Winter	N/A	

== Pre-season and friendlies ==
31 July 2013 Friendly	Real Madrid Castilla (Spain)	2–0	(Spain) Fuenlabrada	Madrid, Spain
	Plano 29'; Sobrino 80'	Report		Stadium: Alfredo Di Stéfano; Attendance: 500

3 August 2013 Friendly	Córdoba (Spain)	0–0	(Spain) Real Madrid Castilla	Palma del Río, Spain
		Report		Stadium: Municipal de Palma del Río; Attendance: 1500

6 August 2013 Friendly	Real Madrid Castilla (Spain)	0–2	(Spain) Alcorcón	Madrid, Spain
		Report	Sales 48', 71'	Stadium: Alfredo Di Stéfano; Attendance: 300

9 August 2013 Friendly	Numancia (Spain)	0–0	(Spain) Real Madrid Castilla	Soria, Spain
		Report		Stadium: Los Pajaritos; Attendance: 400

10 August 2013 (CANCELLED) ~~Friendly~~	Logroñés (Spain)	v	(Spain) Real Madrid Castilla	Logroño, Spain
				Stadium: Las Gaunas

Last updated: 9 August 2013

=== Matches ===
Win Draw Loss

18 August 2013 1	Sporting de Gijón	v
21:00 CEST (UTC+02:00)	Šćepović 22'; Mandi (yellow card) 74'		Casado (yellow card) 88'

2	v	{{{team2}}}

31 August 2013 3	Real Madrid Castilla	0 – 1	AD Alcorcón
	Vázquez (yellow card) 32'; Romero (yellow card) 36'; Plano (yellow card) 42'; Derik (yellow card) 62'; Gómez (yellow card) 90'		Mora (yellow card) 14'; Ángel 17', (yellow card) 87'; Sanz (yellow card) 79'

8 September 2013 4	Real Madrid Castilla	0 – 1	Mirandés
	Pulido (yellow card) 58'; Torró (yellow card) 59'; Casado (yellow card) 66'		Ruiz de Galarreta 21'; Flaño (yellow card) 34'; Koikili (yellow card) 38'; Prieto (yellow card) 73'; Nagore (yellow card) 75'; Mújika (yellow card) 90'

15 September 2013 5	Barcelona B	2 – 0	Real Madrid Castilla
	Suárez (yellow card) 16'; Ramírez 23'; Nieto 27' (pen.) (yellow card) 83'; Espinosa (yellow card) 84'		Torró (yellow card) 26'; Casado (yellow card) 80'; Mascarell (yellow card) 83'

15 September 2013 5	Real Madrid Castilla	1 – 2	Real Zaragoza
	Borja (yellow card) 45'; Franco 58'; Vázquez (yellow card) 59'; De Tomás		Henríquez 5'; Paglialunga (yellow card) 21'; Rodríguez (yellow card) 56', (goal) 76'; Montañés (yellow card) 62'; Álvaro (yellow card) 80'

29 September 2013 6	Real Madrid Castilla	1 – 0	Real Madrid Castilla
	Llorente (yellow card) 26'; Ayoze 51'		Rodríguez (yellow card) 23'; Vázquez (yellow card) 30'; Llorente (yellow card) 59'; Pulido (yellow card) 75'

6 October 2013 7	Real Madrid Castilla	2 – 0	Lugo
	Romero 8'; Llorente (yellow card) 12'; Rodríguez		Á Peña (yellow card) 41'

6 October 2013 8	Real Madrid Castilla	1 – 2	Recreativo de Huelva
	Mascarell (yellow card) 24', (goal) 39' (pen.); Casado 26'; Llorente (yellow card) 45'; Rodríguez (yellow card) 85'		Joselu 7'; Zamora (yellow card) 14'; Ruymán (yellow card) 38'; Morcillo (yellow card) 41'; Arana 45'; Montoro (yellow card) 70'
