= 2012–13 Real Madrid Castilla season =

Real Madrid Castilla
2012–13 season
- President: Nicolás Martín-Sanz
- Manager: Alberto Toril
- Stadium: Alfredo Di Stéfano
- Segunda División: 8th
- Top goalscorer: Jesé (22)
- Highest home attendance: 6,000 vs Barcelona B (25 August 2012)
- Lowest home attendance: 1,200 vs Ponferradina (28 September 2012)
Home colours	Away colours	Third colours

== Players ==
=== Current squad ===
As of 1 February 2013
Note: Flags indicate national team as defined under FIFA eligibility rules; some limited exceptions apply. Players may hold more than one non-FIFA nationality.

No.	Pos.	Nation	Player
1	GK	ESP	Tomás Mejías (vice-captain)
2	MF	ESP	Juanfran (vice-captain)
3	DF	ESP	Jorge Casado
4	DF	ESP	Nacho (captain)
5	DF	ESP	Iván González
6	DF	ESP	David Mateos
7	MF	ESP	Lucas Vázquez
8	MF	ESP	Álex
9	FW	ESP	Álvaro Morata
10	FW	ESP	Jesé
11	MF	ESP	Pedro Mosquera (on loan from Getafe)
13	GK	ESP	Andrés
14	MF	ESP	Jota (on loan from Celta Vigo B)
17	MF	RUS	Denis Cheryshev

No.	Pos.	Nation	Player
18	MF	BRA	Casemiro (on loan from São Paulo)
19	MF	ESP	Borja García
20	DF	BRA	Fabinho (on loan from Rio Ave)
21	FW	ESP	Óscar Plano
22	FW	ESP	Quini
23	DF	ESP	José Antonio Ríos
25	GK	ESP	Jesús
26	MF	ESP	José Rodríguez ♦
27	DF	ESP	Derik ♣
28	FW	ESP	Raúl de Tomás ♦
30	MF	PER	Cristian Benavente ♦
31	GK	ESP	Fernando Pacheco ♣
33	MF	EQG	Omar Mascarell ♣
35	DF	ESP	Diego Llorente ♣

♣ Registered with Real Madrid C
♦ Registered with Juvenil A

=== Out on loan ===
Note: Flags indicate national team as defined under FIFA eligibility rules; some limited exceptions apply. Players may hold more than one non-FIFA nationality.

No.	Pos.	Nation	Player
—	FW	PAR	Javier Acuña (at Girona)
—	MF	ESP	Antonio Martínez (at Mirandés)

=== 2012–13 transfers ===
==== In ====
Note: Flags indicate national team as defined under FIFA eligibility rules; some limited exceptions apply. Players may hold more than one non-FIFA nationality.

No.	Pos.	Nation	Player
—	GK	ESP	Andrés (promoted from Juvenil A)
—	DF	ESP	Iván González (signed from Málaga – free)
—	DF	ESP	David Mateos (loan return from Real Zaragoza)
—	DF	BRA	Fabinho (on loan from Rio Ave)
—	MF	ESP	Pedro Mosquera (re-acquired on loan from Getafe)
—	MF	ESP	Borja García (signed from Córdoba – €1.5M)
—	MF	ESP	Quini (signed from Lucena CF)
—	MF	ESP	Jota (on loan from Celta Vigo B)
—	FW	PAR	Javier Acuña (loan return from Girona)
—	MF	BRA	Casemiro (on loan from São Paulo) •

==== Out ====
Note: Flags indicate national team as defined under FIFA eligibility rules; some limited exceptions apply. Players may hold more than one non-FIFA nationality.

No.	Pos.	Nation	Player
—	GK	ESP	Isaac Becerra (signed with Girona – Free)
—	DF	ESP	Dani Carvajal (signed with Bayer Leverkusen – €5M)
—	DF	ESP	Pablo Gil (signed with Sparta Prague – Free)
—	DF	ESP	Iván (loan return to Málaga)
—	DF	POR	Pedro Mendes (loan return to Sporting CP)
—	MF	ESP	Victor Merchán (signed with Espanyol B – Free)
—	MF	ESP	Pedro Mosquera (loan return to Getafe)
—	MF	ESP	Mandi (signed with Sporting de Gijón – Free)
—	MF	ESP	José Zamora (end of contract)
—	FW	PAR	Javier Acuña (renewed loan to Girona)
—	FW	ESP	Joselu (signed with 1899 Hoffenheim – €6M)
—	MF	ESP	Antonio Martínez (loaned to Mirandés) •

• Winter transfer

== Pre-season and friendlies ==
28 July 2012 Friendly	Real Madrid Castilla (Spain)	2 – 0	(Spain) Getafe B	Madrid, Spain
	Mosquera 5', 90+2' (pen.)	Report		Stadium: Alfredo Di Stéfano

31 July 2012 Friendly	Real Madrid Castilla (Spain)	2 – 2	(Spain) Guadalajara	Madrid, Spain
	Plano 4'; De Tomás 80'	Report	Ortiz 55'; Susaeta 85'	Stadium: Alfredo Di Stéfano

3 August 2012 Friendly	Albacete (Spain)	1 – 2	(Spain) Real Madrid Castilla	Albacete, Spain
	Ruiz 87'	Report	Cheryshev 40'; Fabinho 64'	Stadium: Carlos Belmonte

5 August 2012 Friendly	Gimnástica de Torrelavega (Spain)	0 – 5	(Spain) Real Madrid Castilla	Torrelavega, Spain
		Report	Plano 4', 18'; Cheryshev 26'; Benavente 49'; Quini 60'	Stadium: El Malecón

8 August 2012 Friendly	Real Madrid Castilla (Spain)	1 – 1	(Spain) Alcorcón	Madrid, Spain
	Mosquera 90+1'	Report	Riera 40'	Stadium: Alfredo Di Stéfano

11 August 2012 Decano Trophy	Recreativo de Huelva (Spain)	2 – 2 (3 – 4 p)	(Spain) Real Madrid Castilla	Huelva, Spain
	Granero 70'; Valle 72'	Report	Sobrino 25'; Zamora 90' (o.g.)	Stadium: Nuevo Colombino
	Penalties
	Ernesto (penalty scored) Zamora (penalty missed) Valle (penalty scored) Alexander (penalty scored) Cifuentes (penalty missed)		(penalty missed) Mosquera (penalty scored) De Tomás (penalty scored) Ríos (penalty scored) García (penalty scored) Mateos

Last updated: 13 August 2012

== Competitions ==
=== Overview ===
Competition	Started round	Current position / round	Final position / round	First match	Last match
Segunda División	—	—	8th	17 August 2012	8 June 2013

Updated to match played 8 June 2013
Source: Competitions

=== Segunda División ===
==== League table ====
Pos	Team	Pld	W	D	L	GF	GA	GD	Pts	Promotion, qualification or relegation
6	Las Palmas	42	18	12	12	62	55	+7	66 (Note: LPA 1–0 PON; PON 0–1 LPA)	Qualification to promotion play-offs
7	Ponferradina	42	19	9	14	57	50	+7	66	
8	Real Madrid Castilla	42	17	8	17	80	62	+18	59	
9	Barcelona B	42	15	12	15	76	71	+5	57	
10	Sporting Gijón	42	15	11	16	60	53	+7	56 (Note: SPG 1–1 LUG; LUG 1–2 SPG)	

Source: LFP - Liga Adelante
Rules for classification: 1st points; 2nd head-to-head points; 3rd head-to-head goal difference; 4th head-to-head goals scored; 5th goal difference; 6th number of goals scored; 7th Fair-play points

==== Results summary ====
Overall								Home						Away					
Pld	W	D	L	GF	GA	GD	Pts	W	D	L	GF	GA	GD	W	D	L	GF	GA	GD
42	17	8	17	80	62	+18	59	13	2	6	54	27	+27	4	6	11	26	35	−9

Last updated: 8 June 2013.
Source: Competitive matches

==== Results by round ====
Round	1	2	3	4	5	6	7	8	9	10	11	12	13	14	15	16	17	18	19	20	21	22	23	24	25	26	27	28	29	30	31	32	33	34	35	36	37	38	39	40	41	42
Ground	A	H	A	H	H	A	H	A	H	A	H	A	H	A	H	A	H	A	H	A	H	H	A	H	A	A	H	A	H	A	H	A	H	A	H	A	H	A	H	A	H	A
Result	L	W	L	W	L	W	L	W	W	L	L	D	L	D	L	D	W	L	L	L	D	W	L	W	W	L	W	L	D	L	W	L	W	W	W	D	W	L	W	D	W	D
Position	16	12	15	11	12	11	13	11	7	9	10	12	13	13	15	15	14	15	16	17	16	16	16	14	13	14	13	15	15	15	15	15	15	14	10	11	10	12	10	10	8	8

Updated to match(es) played on 8 June 2013. Source: Competitive Matches
A = Away; H = Home; W = Win; D = Draw; L = Loss

==== Matches ====
Win Draw Loss

17 August 2012 1	Villarreal	2 – 1	Real Madrid Castilla	Villarreal
21:00 CEST (UTC+02:00)	Mellberg (yellow card) 17'; Cavenaghi 45+1', 80'; Toribio (yellow card) 33'; Gómez (yellow card) 71'	Report	Jesé 19' (pen.); Mosquera (yellow card) 36'	Stadium: El Madrigal; Attendance: 8,000; Referee: José María Sánchez Martínez (Murcia)

25 August 2012 2	Real Madrid Castilla	3 – 2	Barcelona B	Madrid
21:00 CEST (UTC+02:00)	Juanfran 10'; Fabinho (yellow card) 17'; Cheryshev 24'; Gómez 46' (o.g.); Nacho (yellow card) 68'; Casado (yellow card) 69'; De Tomás (yellow card) 90'	Report	Mejías 39' (o.g.); Ilie (yellow card) 42'; Deulofeu (yellow card) 50'; Gómez (yellow card) 57' (yellow-red card) 90+3'; Roberto 70' (pen.)	Stadium: Alfredo Di Stéfano; Attendance: 6,000; Referee: Antonio Israel Mariscal Sánchez (Andalusia)

1 September 2012 3	Almería	1 – 0	Real Madrid Castilla	Almería
22:00 CEST (UTC+02:00)	Pellerano (yellow card) 19' (yellow-red card) 80'; Ulloa 23'; Diego (yellow card) 41'; Vidal (yellow card) 53'; Charles (yellow card) 61'; Soriano (yellow card) 90+3'; Christian (yellow card) 90+4'	Report	Morata (yellow card) 19'; Fabinho (yellow card) 65'; Casado (yellow card) 71'; Nacho (yellow card) 78'	Stadium: Juegos Mediterráneos; Attendance: 7,148; Referee: Francisco Manuel Arias López (Cantabria)

8 September 2012 4	Real Madrid Castilla	3 – 2	Xerez	Madrid
22:00 CEST (UTC+02:00)	Álex (yellow card) 29'; Morata 32'; García 40'; Mosquera (yellow card) 49'; Jesé 54'; Mateos (yellow card) 69'	Report	Vélez 20'; García (yellow card) 31'; Mendoza (yellow card) 39'; Vega (yellow card) 61'; Maldonado (yellow card) 73'; Mari 90+3'	Stadium: Alfredo Di Stéfano; Attendance: 2,240; Referee: Ricardo de Burgos Bengoetxea (Basque Country)

14 September 2012 5	Real Madrid Castilla	2 – 3	Sabadell	Madrid
21:00 CEST (UTC+02:00)	Juanfran 15'; Nacho (yellow card) 30'; Mosquera (yellow card) 30'; Jesé 35', (yellow card) 59'; García (yellow card) 90+2'	Report	Tortolero (yellow card) 22'; Moha 49'; Aníbal 53', 57'; Ciércoles (yellow card) 84'; Espasandín (yellow card) 85'	Stadium: Alfredo Di Stéfano; Attendance: 2,560; Referee: Mario Melero López (Andalusia)

22 September 2012 6	Guadalajara	3 – 4	Real Madrid Castilla	Guadalajara
20:00 CEST (UTC+02:00)	Aitor (yellow card) 5', (goal) 35'; Azkorra 53'; Soriano (yellow card) 60'; Antón 69'; Toño (yellow card) 79'	Report	Jesé 13', 55'; Cheryshev 67'; Mosquera 81'; Fabinho (yellow card) 83'; Rodríguez (yellow card) 87'	Stadium: Pedro Escartín; Attendance: 3,200; Referee: David Medié Jiménez (Catalonia)

28 September 2012 7	Real Madrid Castilla	1 – 2	Ponferradina	Madrid
21:00 CEST (UTC+02:00)	García 16'	Report	Yuri 60'; González 90+2' (o.g.)	Stadium: Alfredo Di Stéfano; Attendance: 1,200; Referee: José Ramón Piñeiro Crespo (Asturias)

8 October 2012 8	Hércules	2 – 4	Real Madrid Castilla	Alicante
21:30 CEST (UTC+02:00)	Gilvan 17'; Mérida 30' (pen.)	Report	Cheryshev 32'; Casado 61'; Morata 79'; Jesé 90+3'	Stadium: Rico Pérez; Attendance: 7,000; Referee: Ocón Arráiz (La Rioja)

15 October 2012 9	Real Madrid Castilla	3 – 2	Las Palmas	Madrid
21:00 CEST (UTC+02:00)	García 3'; Jesé 30'; Vázquez 68'	Report	García 6'; Vitolo 67'	Stadium: Alfredo Di Stéfano; Attendance: 1,963; Referee: Fernando Lopez Acera (Extremadura)

20 October 2012 10	Córdoba	1 – 0	Real Madrid Castilla	Córdoba
16:00 CEST (UTC+02:00)	Patiño 90+1'	Report		Stadium: Nuevo Arcángel; Attendance: 12,000; Referee: Ricardo de Burgos Bengoetxea (Basque Country)

28 October 2012 11	Real Madrid Castilla	2 – 4	Sporting de Gijón	Madrid
12:00 CET (UTC+01:00)	Jesé (red card) 17'; Álex 44', 58' (pen.)	Report	Carmona 7'; Bilić 13', 53'; De las Cuevas 69'	Stadium: Alfredo Di Stéfano; Attendance: 6,000; Referee: Jaime Latre (Aragon)

4 November 2012 12	Huesca	2 – 2	Real Madrid Castilla	Huesca
12:00 CET (UTC+01:00)	Diogo 49'; González 75' (o.g.); Helguera (red card) 90+3'	Report	Juanfran 3'; Casado (red card) 30'; Cheryshev 65'	Stadium: El Alcoraz; Attendance: 2,486; Referee: Pino Zamorano (Castile-La Mancha)

12 November 2012 13	Real Madrid Castilla	0 – 1	Recreativo de Huelva	Madrid
21:00 CET (UTC+01:00)		Report	Alexander 77'	Stadium: Alfredo Di Stéfano; Attendance: 1,727; Referee: Prieto Iglesias (Navarre)

18 November 2012 14	Mirandés	0 – 0	Real Madrid Castilla	Miranda de Ebro
18:00 CET (UTC+01:00)	Caneda (red card) 24'	Report		Stadium: Anduva; Attendance: 5,212; Referee: Juan Martínez Munuera (Valencian Community)

25 November 2012 15	Real Madrid Castilla	2 – 4	Numancia	Madrid
19:00 CET (UTC+01:00)	Plano 22'; García 46'	Report	Natalio 2', 52'; Del Pino 78'; Regalón 81'	Stadium: Alfredo Di Stéfano; Attendance: 2,301; Referee: Figueroa Vázquez (Andalusia)

30 November 2012 16	Murcia	0 – 0	Real Madrid Castilla	Murcia
21:30 CET (UTC+01:00)		Report		Stadium: Nueva Condomina; Attendance: 7,630; Referee: Pablo González (Asturias)

9 December 2012 17	Real Madrid Castilla	4 – 0	Racing Santander	Madrid
19:00 CET (UTC+01:00)	Jesé 16', 43' (pen.); Cheryshev 52', 55'	Report		Stadium: Alfredo Di Stéfano; Attendance: 2,497; Referee: Valdés Aller (Castile and León)

14 December 2012 18	Lugo	3 – 2	Real Madrid Castilla	Lugo
21:00 CET (UTC+01:00)	V. Díaz 3'; Ó. Díaz 41' (pen.); Sol 86'	Report	Jesé 7'; Juanfran 37'	Stadium: Anxo Carro; Attendance: 3,800; Referee: Melero López (Andalusia)

21 December 2012 19	Real Madrid Castilla	0 – 1	Elche	Madrid
20:00 CET (UTC+01:00)		Report	Rivera (red card) 80'; Albácar 90+4'	Stadium: Alfredo Di Stéfano; Attendance: 2,582; Referee: Vicandi Garrido (Basque Country)

5 January 2013 20	Alcorcón	3 – 2	Real Madrid Castilla	Alcorcón
20:00 CET (UTC+01:00)	Miguélez 40'; Riera 62', 70'	Report	Jesé 6'; Cheryshev 22'	Stadium: Santo Domingo; Attendance: 3,342; Referee: Jaime Latre (Aragon)

13 January 2013 21	Real Madrid Castilla	0 – 0	Girona	Madrid
12:00 CET (UTC+01:00)		Report		Stadium: Alfredo Di Stéfano; Attendance: 2,472; Referee: Arcediano Monescillo (Castile-La Mancha)

19 January 2013 22	Real Madrid Castilla	5 – 0	Villarreal	Madrid
20:00 CET (UTC+01:00)	Morata 18'; García 45'; Mosquera 73'; Jesé 75'; Cheryshev 78'	Report		Stadium: Alfredo Di Stéfano; Attendance: 3,000; Referee: Francisco Manuel Arias López (Cantabria)

27 January 2013 23	Barcelona B	3 – 1	Real Madrid Castilla	Barcelona
17:00 CET (UTC+01:00)	Araujo 65', 70'; Deulofeu 79' (pen.)	Report	Morata 35'; Álex (red card) 56'	Stadium: Mini Estadi; Attendance: 12,050; Referee: Valdés Aller (Castile and León)

4 February 2013 24	Real Madrid Castilla	2 – 1	Almería	Madrid
21:00 CET (UTC+01:00)	Jesé 25'; Morata 67'	Report	Charles 7' (pen.)	Stadium: Alfredo Di Stéfano; Attendance: 1,900; Referee: Ocón Arráiz (La Rioja)

9 February 2013 25	Xerez	0 – 1	Real Madrid Castilla	Jerez de la Frontera
18:00 CET (UTC+01:00)	R. García (red card) 35'	Report	Vázquez 88'	Stadium: Chapín; Attendance: 6,474; Referee: Pérez Pallas (Galicia)

16 February 2013 26	Sabadell	3 – 1	Real Madrid Castilla	Sabadell
20:00 CET (UTC+01:00)	Aníbal 7', 78'; Eneko 50'	Report	Plano 77'	Stadium: Nova Creu Alta; Attendance: 6,420; Referee: Daniel Jesús Trujillo Suárez (Canary Islands)

24 February 2013 27	Real Madrid Castilla	2 – 1	Guadalajara	Madrid
12:00 CET (UTC+01:00)	Jesé 22'; Cheryshev 55'	Report	Kepa 78'	Stadium: Alfredo Di Stéfano; Attendance: 4,100; Referee: Ricardo de Burgos Bengoetxea (Basque Country)

3 March 2013 28	Ponferradina	2 – 0	Real Madrid Castilla	Ponferrada
18:00 CET (UTC+01:00)	Mosquera 28' (o.g.); Lafuente 76'	Report		Stadium: El Toralín; Attendance: 6,800; Referee: Arias López (Cantabria)

11 March 2013 29	Real Madrid Castilla	1 – 1	Hércules	Madrid
21:00 CET (UTC+01:00)	Mosquera 84'	Report	González 25'; Pamarot (red card) 69'	Stadium: Alfredo Di Stéfano; Attendance: 1,634; Referee: David Medié Jiménez (Catalonia)

16 March 2013 30	Las Palmas	2 – 0	Real Madrid Castilla	Las Palmas de Gran Canaria
18:00 CET (UTC+01:00)	Bifouma 27'; Nauzet 87'	Report		Stadium: Gran Canaria; Attendance: 15,532; Referee: Antonio Israel Mariscal Sánchez (Andalusia)

24 March 2013 31	Real Madrid Castilla	4 – 0	Córdoba	Madrid
12:00 CET (UTC+01:00)	Jesé 4' (pen.), 15'; Morata 28', 82'	Report		Stadium: Alfredo Di Stéfano; Attendance: 4,132; Referee: Valdés Aller (Castile and León)

30 March 2013 32	Sporting de Gijón	1 – 0	Real Madrid Castilla	Gijón
18:00 CET (UTC+01:00)	Canella 41'	Report		Stadium: El Molinón; Attendance: 19,951; Referee: Prieto Iglesias (Navarre)

7 April 2013 33	Real Madrid Castilla	5 – 1	Huesca	Madrid
21:00 CEST (UTC+02:00)	Jesé 9', 60'; García 14'; Lázaro 87' (o.g.); Vázquez 90+2'	Report	Borja 63'	Stadium: Alfredo Di Stéfano; Attendance: 1,750; Referee: Melero López (Andalusia)

13 April 2013 34	Recreativo	1 – 3	Real Madrid Castilla	Huelva
20:00 CEST (UTC+02:00)	Brożek 79'; Morcillo (red card) 83'	Report	Mateos 47'; Jesé 53'; Plano 86'	Stadium: Nuevo Colombino; Attendance: 5,000; Referee: David Medié Jiménez (Catalonia)

21 April 2013 35	Real Madrid Castilla	6 – 1	Mirandés	Madrid
21:00 CEST (UTC+02:00)	González 36'; Morata 50', 64'; García 52'; Cheryshev 68'; Jesé 75'	Report	Goiria 85' (pen.)	Stadium: Alfredo Di Stéfano; Attendance: 1,700; Referee: Juan Martínez Munuera (Valencian Community)

28 April 2013 36	Numancia	3 – 3	Real Madrid Castilla	Soria
21:00 CEST (UTC+02:00)	Bonilla 3'; Álvarez 41'; Pedro 65'	Report	Cheryshev 7'; Jaio 37' (o.g.); Fabinho 90+3'	Stadium: Los Pajaritos; Attendance: 2,271; Referee: José Ramón Piñeiro Crespo (Asturias)

5 May 2013 37	Real Madrid Castilla	2 – 0	Murcia	Madrid
17:00 CEST (UTC+02:00)	Jesé 55'; Álex 79' (pen.)	Report		Stadium: Alfredo Di Stéfano; Attendance: 3,200; Referee: Pablo González (Asturias)

12 May 2013 38	Racing Santander	1 – 0	Real Madrid Castilla	Santander
17:00 CEST (UTC+02:00)	Ferreiro 60'	Report	Cheryshev (red card) 45'	Stadium: El Sardinero; Attendance: 12,162; Referee: Vicandi Garrido (Basque Country)

18 May 2013 39	Real Madrid Castilla	3 – 1	Lugo	Madrid
18:00 CEST (UTC+02:00)	García 25'; Morata 38', 88'	Report	Pérez 40'	Stadium: Alfredo Di Stéfano; Attendance: 2,220; Referee: Mario Melero López (Andalusia)

26 May 2013 40	Elche	1 – 1	Real Madrid Castilla	Elche
17:00 CEST (UTC+02:00)	Generelo 56'	Report	Fabinho 34'	Stadium: Martínez Valero; Attendance: 19,576; Referee: Antonio Israel Mariscal Sánchez (Andalusia)

2 June 2013 41	Real Madrid Castilla	4 – 0	Alcorcón	Madrid
18:00 CEST (UTC+02:00)	Casemiro 3'; García 12'; Morata 46'; Jesé 64'	Report		Stadium: Alfredo Di Stéfano; Attendance: 4,300; Referee: Francisco Manuel Arias López (Cantabria)

8 June 2013 42	Girona	1 – 1	Real Madrid Castilla	Girona
19:00 CEST (UTC+02:00)	Vélez 60'	Report	Plano 62'	Stadium: Montilivi; Attendance: 6,903; Referee: José María Sánchez Martínez (Murcia)

== Statistics ==
=== Squad statistics ===
No.	Pos.	Nat.	Name	Segunda División			
No.	Pos.	Nat.	Name	GS	Apps	Min	Goals
3	LB	(Spain)	Jorge Casado	39	39	3372	1
2	RW	(Spain)	Juanfran	40	42	3356	4
10	ST	(Spain)	Jesé	37	38	3123	22
11	DM	(Spain)	Pedro Mosquera	36	38	3109	3
19	AM	(Spain)	Borja García	31	41	2733	9
6	CB	(Spain)	David Mateos	30	31	2600	1
17	LW	(Russia)	Denis Cheryshev	31	34	2530	11
20	RB	(Brazil)	Fabinho	28	30	2495	2
5	CB	(Spain)	Iván González	27	29	2447	1
1	GK	(Spain)	Tomás Mejías	26	26	2317	0
8	DM	(Spain)	Álex	26	32	2193	3
4	CB	(Spain)	Nacho	19	19	1710	0
9	CF	(Spain)	Álvaro Morata	18	18	1615	12
25	GK	(Spain)	Jesús	14	14	1260	0
18	DM	(Brazil)	Casemiro	15	15	1201	1
21	CF	(Spain)	Óscar Plano	9	37	1096	4
26	CM	(Spain)	José Rodríguez	8	24	1028	0
27	CB	(Spain)	Derik	9	11	906	0
7	RW	(Spain)	Lucas Vázquez	6	26	816	3
33	CM	(Equatorial Guinea)	Omar Mascarell	6	14	596	0
22	RW	(Spain)	Quini	3	9	260	0
23	LB	(Spain)	José Antonio Ríos	2	2	180	0
31	GK	(Spain)	Fernando Pacheco	2	2	180	0
28	CF	(Spain)	Raúl de Tomás	0	7	64	0
14	AM	(Spain)	Jota	0	3	51	0
35	RB	(Spain)	Diego Llorente	0	1	49	0
29	CF	(Spain)	Rubén Sobrino	0	2	34	0
13	GK	(Spain)	Andrés	0	1	23	0
36	AM	(Spain)	Burgui	0	1	21	0

Ordered by minutes played
Last updated: 8 June 2013
Source: Match reports in Competitive matches

=== Goals ===
R	Player	Position	Segunda División
1	(Spain) Jesé	ST	22
2	(Spain) Álvaro Morata	CF	12
3	(Russia) Denis Cheryshev	LW	11
4	(Spain) Borja García	AM	9
5	(Spain) Juanfran	RW	4
5	(Spain) Óscar Plano	CF	4
7	(Spain) Pedro Mosquera	DM	3
7	(Spain) Lucas Vázquez	RW	3
7	(Spain) Álex	DM	3
10	(Brazil) Fabinho	RB	2
11	(Spain) Jorge Casado	LB	1
11	(Spain) David Mateos	CB	1
11	(Spain) Iván González	CB	1
11	(Brazil) Casemiro	DM	1
Own goals			3
Total			80

Last updated: 8 June 2013
Source: Match reports in Competitive matches

=== Disciplinary record ===
N	P	Nat.	Player	Yellow card	Second yellow card	Red card	Notes
3	DF	(Spain)	Jorge Casado	6		1	
8	MF	(Spain)	Álex	6		1	
10	FW	(Spain)	Jesé	6		1	
17	MF	(Russia)	Denis Cheryshev	6		1	
11	MF	(Spain)	Pedro Mosquera	11			
6	DF	(Spain)	David Mateos	10			
20	DF	(Brazil)	Fabinho	10			
5	DF	(Spain)	Iván González	9			
19	MF	(Spain)	Borja García	9			
18	MF	(Brazil)	Casemiro	7			
4	DF	(Spain)	Nacho	6			
9	FW	(Spain)	Álvaro Morata	6			
26	MF	(Spain)	José Rodríguez	6			
7	MF	(Spain)	Lucas Vázquez	3			
21	FW	(Spain)	Óscar Plano	3			
33	MF	(Equatorial Guinea)	Omar Mascarell	3			
22	FW	(Spain)	Quini	2			
1	GK	(Spain)	Tomás Mejías	1			
2	MF	(Spain)	Juanfran	1			
14	MF	(Spain)	Jota	1			
27	DF	(Spain)	Derik	1			
28	FW	(Spain)	Raúl de Tomás	1			

Last updated: 8 June 2013
Source: Match reports in Competitive matches

=== Overall ===
	Total	Home	Away
Games played	42	21	21
Games won	17	13	4
Games drawn	8	2	6
Games lost	17	6	11
Biggest win	5–0 vs Villarreal; 6–1 vs Mirandés	5–0 vs Villarreal; 6–1 vs Mirandés	3–1 vs Recreativo; 4–2 vs Hércules
Biggest loss	0–2 vs Las Palmas; 0–2 vs Ponferradina; 1–3 vs Barcelona B 1–3 vs Sabadell; 2–4 vs Sporting de Gijón; 2–4 vs Numancia	2–4 vs Sporting de Gijón; 2–4 vs Numancia	0–2 vs Las Palmas; 0–2 vs Ponferradina; 1–3 vs Barcelona B 1–3 vs Sabadell
Clean sheets	9	6	3
Goals scored	80	54	26
Goals conceded	62	27	35
Goal difference	+18	+27	-9
Average GF per game	1.9	2.57	1.24
Average GA per game	1.48	1.29	1.67
Yellow cards	114	56	58
Red cards	4	1	3
Most appearances	(Spain) Juanfran (42)	–	
Most minutes played	(Spain) Jorge Casado (3372)	–	
Most goals	(Spain) Jesé (22)	–	
Most assists	(Spain) Jesé (11)	–	
Points	59/126 (46.83%)	41/63 (65.08%)	18/63 (28.57%)
Winning rate	40.48%	61.9%	19.05%

Last updated: 8 June 2013
Source: Match reports in Competitive matches
