= 2017–18 Málaga CF season =

Málaga CF
2017–18 season
- Owner: Abdullah Al Thani
- Manager: Míchel (until 13 January); José González (from 13 January to 22 June)
- Stadium: La Rosaleda
- La Liga: 20th (relegated)
- Copa del Rey: Round of 32
- Top goalscorer: League: Youssef En-Nesyri (5); All: Youssef En-Nesyri (5)
Home colours	Away colours	Third colours

During the 2017–18 season, Málaga CF are participating in La Liga and the Copa del Rey.

== Squad ==
As of 29 August 2017

Note: Flags indicate national team as defined under FIFA eligibility rules; some limited exceptions apply. Players may hold more than one non-FIFA nationality.

No.	Pos.	Nation	Player
1	GK	ESP	Roberto (on loan from Espanyol)
3	DF	ESP	Diego González
4	DF	ESP	Luis Hernández
5	MF	ARG	Esteban Rolón
6	MF	SRB	Zdravko Kuzmanović (on loan from Basel)
7	DF	ESP	Juankar
8	MF	ESP	Adrián
9	FW	ESP	Borja Bastón (on loan from Swansea City)
10	MF	VEN	Juanpi
11	MF	URU	Chory Castro
12	DF	ESP	Cifu
13	GK	TUR	Cenk Gönen
14	MF	ESP	Recio (captain)

No.	Pos.	Nation	Player
15	DF	URU	Federico Ricca
16	FW	VEN	Adalberto Peñaranda (on loan from Watford)
17	MF	ESP	Javi Ontiveros
18	DF	VEN	Roberto Rosales
19	MF	ARG	Emanuel Cecchini
20	MF	ESP	Keko
21	MF	ESP	Jony
22	DF	FRA	Paul Baysse
23	DF	ESP	Miguel Torres
24	FW	URU	Diego Rolán (on loan from Bordeaux)
25	GK	ESP	Andrés Prieto
26	FW	MAR	Youssef En-Nesyri
28	MF	ESP	Álex Mula

=== Transfers ===
- List of Spanish football transfers summer 2017#Málaga

==== In ====
Date	Player	From	Type	Fee	Ref
23 May 2017	(Spain) Adrián	(Spain) Eibar	Transfer	Free	
27 June 2017	(France) Paul Baysse	(France) Nice	Transfer	Free	
30 June 2017	(Mexico) Guillermo Ochoa	(Spain) Granada	Loan return	Free	
30 June 2017	(Spain) Cifu	(Spain) Girona	Loan return	Free	
30 June 2017	(Portugal) Ricardo Horta	(Portugal) Braga	Loan return	Free	
30 June 2017	(Morocco) Adnane Tighadouini	(Netherlands) Vitesse	Loan return	Free	
1 July 2017	(Spain) Luis Muñoz	(Spain) Málaga B	Promoted		
4 July 2017	(Spain) Andrés Prieto	(Spain) Espanyol B	Transfer	Free	
4 July 2017	(Spain) Borja Bastón	(Wales) Swansea City	Loan	Free	
5 July 2017	(Spain) Roberto	(Spain) Espanyol	Loan	Free	
19 July 2017	(Turkey) Cenk Gönen	(Turkey) Galatasaray	Transfer	€200,000	
19 July 2017	(Spain) Juankar	(Portugal) Braga	Transfer	Free	
27 July 2017	(Argentina) Emanuel Cecchini	(Argentina) Banfield	Transfer	€4,000,000	
3 August 2017	(Spain) Diego González	(Spain) Sevilla Atlético	Transfer	€500,000	
25 August 2017	(Argentina) Esteban Rolón	(Argentina) Argentinos Juniors	Transfer	€3,500,000	
29 August 2017	(Uruguay) Diego Rolán	(France) Bordeaux	Loan	Free	

Total spending: ▼€8,200,000

==== Out ====
Date	Player	To	Type	Fee	Ref
22 May 2017	(Argentina) Martín Demichelis	Retired			
22 May 2017	(Portugal) Duda	TBD		Free	
22 May 2017	(Brazil) Weligton	Retired			
30 June 2017	(Spain) Diego Llorente	(Spain) Real Madrid	Loan return	Free	
30 June 2017	(Spain) Juankar	(Portugal) Braga	Loan return	Free	
30 June 2017	(Spain) José Rodríguez	(Germany) Mainz 05	Loan return	Free	
30 June 2017	(Ukraine) Denys Boyko	(Turkey) Beşiktaş	Loan return	Free	
3 July 2017	(Spain) Sandro	(England) Everton	Transfer	€6,000,000	
4 July 2017	(Brazil) Charles	(Spain) Eibar	Transfer	Free	
5 July 2017	(Cameroon) Carlos Kameni	(Turkey) Fenerbahçe	Transfer	Free	
8 July 2017	(Spain) Ignacio Camacho	(Germany) VfL Wolfsburg	Transfer	€15,000,000	
9 July 2017	(Mexico) Guillermo Ochoa	(Belgium) Standard Liège	Transfer	Free	
18 July 2017	(Portugal) Ricardo Horta	(Portugal) Braga	Transfer	Free	
24 July 2017	(Spain) Pablo Fornals	(Spain) Villarreal	Transfer	€12,000,000	
10 August 2017	(Venezuela) Mikel Villanueva	(Spain) Cádiz	Loan	Free	
14 August 2017	(Uruguay) Michael Santos	(Spain) Sporting Gijón	Loan	Free	
23 August 2017	(Morocco) Adnane Tighadouini	(Netherlands) Twente	Loan	Free	
26 August 2017	(Burkina Faso) Bakary Koné	(France) Strasbourg	Loan	Free	
29 August 2017	(Spain) Luis Muñoz	(Spain) Lugo	Loan	Free	

Total income: ▲€31,000,000

Net: ▲€22,700,000

== Competitions ==
=== Overall ===
Competition	Final position
La Liga	20th
Copa del Rey	Round of 32

=== Liga ===
==== League table ====
Pos	Team	Pld	W	D	L	GF	GA	GD	Pts	Qualification or relegation
16	Athletic Bilbao	38	10	13	15	41	49	−8	43 (Note: Athletic Bilbao finished ahead of Leganés on head-to-head goal difference: Athletic Bilbao 2–0 Leganés, Leganés 1–0 Athletic Bilbao.)	
17	Leganés	38	12	7	19	34	51	−17	43	
18	Deportivo La Coruña (R)	38	6	11	21	38	76	−38	29	Relegation to Segunda División
19	Las Palmas (R)	38	5	7	26	24	74	−50	22	Relegation to Segunda División
20	Málaga (R)	38	5	5	28	24	61	−37	20	Relegation to Segunda División

Source: La Liga, Soccerway
Rules for classification: 1) Points; 2) Head-to-head points; 3) Head-to-head goal difference; 4) Goal difference; 5) Goals scored; 6) Fair-play points (Note: Head-to-head record is used only after all the matches between the teams in question have been played)
(R) Relegated

==== Matches ====
Win Draw Loss Fixtures

21 August 2017 1	Málaga	0–1	Eibar	Málaga
22:00 CEST (UTC+02:00)	González (yellow card) 45'; Jony (yellow card) 90'	Report	Charles (yellow card) 3', (goal) 57'; Kike (yellow card) 32'; Alejo (yellow card) 83'	Stadium: La Rosaleda; Attendance: 24,838; Referee: David Medié Jiménez

26 August 2017 2	Girona	1–0	Málaga	Girona
20:15 CEST (UTC+02:00)	Granell (yellow card) 22'; Alcalá 28'; Iraizoz (yellow card) 55'; Muniesa (yellow card) 56'	Report	Ontiveros (yellow card) 58'; Recio (yellow card) 63'; Cecchini (yellow card) 64'; Mula (yellow card) 90+4'	Stadium: Montilivi; Attendance: 9,748; Referee: Santiago Jaime Latre

11 September 2017 3	Málaga	1–3	Las Palmas	Málaga
21:00 CEST (UTC+02:00)	Adrián (yellow card) 23'; González 48'; Recio (yellow card) 61'; Borja Bastón (yellow card) 65'; Ontiveros (yellow card) 82'	Report	Viera 45'; D. Castellano (yellow card) 67'; Calleri 69'; Michel (yellow card) 80'; Rémy 88'	Stadium: La Rosaleda; Attendance: 22,697; Referee: Xavier Estrada Fernández

16 September 2017 4	Atlético Madrid	1–0	Málaga	Madrid
20:45 CEST (UTC+02:00)	Griezmann 61'; Carrasco (yellow card) 64'; Juanfran (yellow card) 76'	Report	Keko (yellow card) 88'; Recio (yellow card) 90+3'	Stadium: Wanda Metropolitano; Attendance: 63,114; Referee: José María Sánchez Martínez

19 September 2017 5	Valencia	5–0	Málaga	Valencia
20:00 CEST (UTC+02:00)	Mina 17'; Zaza 55', 60', 63'; Rodrigo 86'	Report	Ricca (yellow card) 83'	Stadium: Mestalla; Attendance: 36,215; Referee: Alfonso Álvarez Izquierdo

23 September 2017 6	Málaga	3–3	Athletic Bilbao	Málaga
18:30 CEST (UTC+02:00)	Hernández (yellow card) 3'; Rolán 35', 84'; Borja Bastón (yellow card) 49'; Ricca (yellow card) 51'; Kuzmanović (yellow card) 52' (yellow-red card) 52'; Recio (yellow card) 53'; Rosales (yellow card) 60'; Baysse 81'	Report	Aduriz 4' (pen.); Williams 51', 70'; Laporte (yellow card) 53'; Aketxe (yellow card) 89'	Stadium: La Rosaleda; Attendance: 23,425; Referee: Carlos del Cerro Grande

30 September 2017 7	Sevilla	2–0	Málaga	Seville
16:15 CEST (UTC+02:00)	Banega 68' (pen.); Muriel 70'; Mercado (yellow card) 79'; Kjær (yellow card) 79'	Report	Rolón (yellow card) 45'	Stadium: Ramón Sánchez Pizjuán; Attendance: 34,430; Referee: Daniel Trujillo Suárez

15 October 2017 8	Málaga	0–2	Leganés	Málaga
18:30 CEST (UTC+02:00)	Baysse (yellow card) 38'; Recio (yellow card) 43' (yellow-red card) 81'; Rosales (yellow card) 84'	Report	Zaldúa (yellow card) 22'; Siovas (yellow card) 47'; Gabriel 56'; Szymanowski 78'; Pérez (yellow card) 90'	Stadium: La Rosaleda; Attendance: 23,951; Referee: José González González

21 October 2017 9	Barcelona	2–0	Málaga	Barcelona
20:45 CEST	Deulofeu 2'; Iniesta 56'; Umtiti (yellow card) 74'	Report	Rosales (yellow card) 21'; Hernández (yellow card) 26'; Adrián (yellow card) 39'; Cecchini (yellow card) 82'	Stadium: Camp Nou; Attendance: 74,397; Referee: Pablo González Fuertes

29 October 2017 10	Málaga	2–1	Celta Vigo	Málaga
20:45 CEST (UTC+02:00)	Hernández (yellow card) 34'; Adrián 45'; Castro (yellow card) 62'; Recio 83' (pen.)	Report	Mallo (yellow card) 15'; Aspas 76', (yellow card) 90+1'; Cabral (yellow card) 82'	Stadium: La Rosaleda; Attendance: 17,454; Referee: Santiago Jaime Latre

5 November 2017 11	Villarreal	2–0	Málaga	Villarreal
18:30 CET (UTC+01:00)	Chuca (yellow card) 45'; Sansone 68', 76'; Costa (yellow card) 81'	Report	Castro (yellow card) 32'; Peñaranda (yellow card) 38'; Adrián (yellow card) 60'; Juankar (yellow card) 75'; Recio (yellow card) 83'	Stadium: La Cerámica; Attendance: 17,522; Referee: Xavier Estrada Fernández

19 November 2017 12	Málaga	3–2	Deportivo La Coruña	Málaga
12:00 CET (UTC+01:00)	Rosales 15', (yellow card) 42'; Peñaranda (yellow card) 33'; Juanpi (yellow card) 63'; Castro 63'; Borja Bastón 84'; Juankar (yellow card) 88'	Report	Pérez 23'; Guilherme (yellow card) 33'; Schär 52'; Navarro (yellow card) 55'; Bakkali (yellow card) 64'; Luisinho (yellow card) 87'; Çolak (yellow card) 90+1'	Stadium: La Rosaleda; Attendance: 24,563; Referee: Juan Martínez Munuera

25 November 2017 13	Real Madrid	3–2	Málaga	Madrid
16:15	Benzema 9'; Casemiro 21'; Marcelo (yellow card) 45'; Ronaldo 76'	Report	Rolán 18'; Peñaranda (yellow card) 29'; Adrián (yellow card) 43'; Castro 58'	Stadium: Santiago Bernabéu; Attendance: 75,671; Referee: Jesús Gil Manzano

1 December 2017 14	Málaga	0–0	Levante	Málaga
21:00 CET (UTC+01:00)	Hernández (yellow card) 30'	Report	Samu (yellow card) 36'; Bardhi (yellow card) 51'; Campaña (yellow card) 90+1'	Stadium: La Rosaleda; Attendance: 18,172; Referee: Ricardo de Burgos Bengoetxea

10 December 2017 15	Real Sociedad	0–2	Málaga	San Sebastián
12:00 CET (UTC+01:00)	Zurutuza (yellow card) 36'	Report	Castro (yellow card) 9', (goal) 58'; Borja Bastón 23' (pen.)	Stadium: Anoeta; Attendance: 16,834; Referee: Carlos del Cerro Grande

18 December 2017 16	Málaga	0–2	Real Betis	Málaga
21:00 CET (UTC+01:00)	Rosales (yellow card) 42'; Adrián (red card) 61'; Ontiveros (yellow card) 90+3'	Report	León 24'; Camarasa 50'; Barragán (yellow card) 71'; Joaquín (yellow card) 84'	Stadium: La Rosaleda; Attendance: 22,742; Referee: Javier Alberola Rojas

21 December 2017 17	Alavés	1–0	Málaga	Vitoria-Gasteiz
21:30 CET (UTC+01:00)	M. García (yellow card) 20'; Duarte (yellow card) 28'; Burgui (yellow card) 57'; Munir 60'	Report	Ontiveros (yellow card) 28'; Hernández (yellow card) 28'; Miquel (yellow card) 56'; Recio (yellow card) 70'	Stadium: Mendizorrotza; Attendance: 18,733; Referee: Alfonso Álvarez Izquierdo

7 January 2018 18	Málaga	0–1	Espanyol	Málaga
21:00 CET (UTC+01:00)	Recio (yellow card) 7'; González (yellow card) 78'	Report	David López (yellow card) 3'; Darder 6'; Hermoso (yellow card) 32'; Fuego (yellow card) 81'	Stadium: La Rosaleda; Attendance: 12,357; Referee: Antonio Mateu Lahoz

12 January 2018 19	Getafe	1–0	Málaga	Getafe
21:00 CET (UTC+01:00)	Amath (yellow card) 10'; Antunes (yellow card) 14'; Cala 73'; Bruno (yellow card) 81'	Report	Recio (yellow card) 90'	Stadium: Coliseum Alfonso Pérez; Attendance: 9,513; Referee: Juan Martínez Munuera

22 January 2018 20	Eibar	1–1	Málaga	Eibar
21:00 CET (UTC+01:00)	Kike 76'; Orellana (yellow card) 89'	Report	En-Nesyri 16'; Ricca (yellow card) 44'; Kuzmanović (yellow card) 90+1' (yellow-red card) 90+2'	Stadium: Ipurua; Attendance: 4,514; Referee: David Medié Jiménez

28 January 2018 21	Málaga	0–0	Girona	Málaga
18:30 CET (UTC+01:00)	Castro (yellow card) 67' (yellow-red card) 78'	Report	Ramalho (yellow card) 34'	Stadium: La Rosaleda; Attendance: 22,125; Referee: Alberto Undiano Mallenco

5 February 2018 22	Las Palmas	1–0	Málaga	Las Palmas
21:00 CET (UTC+01:00)	Peñalba (yellow card) 35'; Halilović 90'; Tana (yellow card) 90+3'	Report	Miquel (yellow card) 35'; Recio (yellow card) 40'; 8 Keko (yellow card) 76'	Stadium: Gran Canaria; Attendance: 17,331; Referee: Ricardo de Burgos Bengoetxea

10 February 2018 23	Málaga	0–1	Atlético Madrid	Málaga
16:15 CET (UTC+01:00)	Iturra (yellow card) 20'; Lacen (yellow card) 60'; En-Nesyri (yellow card) 78'	Report	Griezmann 1'; Saúl (yellow card) 41'; Vrsaljko (yellow card) 67'	Stadium: La Rosaleda; Attendance: 25,651; Referee: José María Sánchez Martínez

17 February 2018 24	Málaga	1–2	Valencia	Málaga
20:45 CET (UTC+01:00)	Ideye 27'; Iturra (yellow card) 62'; Castro (yellow card) 75'; Miquel (red card) 84'	Report	Murillo (yellow card) 33'; Coquelin (yellow card) 70', (goal) 80'; Parejo (yellow card) 75', (goal) 85' (pen.); Soler (yellow card) 77'	Stadium: La Rosaleda; Attendance: 21,276; Referee: Daniel Trujillo Suárez

25 February 2018 25	Athletic Bilbao	2–1	Málaga	Bilbao
16:15 CET (UTC+01:00)	Martínez (yellow card) 15'; Susaeta 17'; San José 44'; Lekue (yellow card) 60'; De Marcos (yellow card) 63'	Report	En-Nesyri 13', (yellow card) 65' (yellow-red card) 84'; González (yellow card) 24'; Adrián (yellow card) 74'	Stadium: San Mamés; Attendance: 37,734; Referee: Alejandro Hernández Hernández

28 February 2018 26	Málaga	0–1	Sevilla	Málaga
19:30 CET (UTC+01:00)	Ideye (yellow card) 44'; Rosales (yellow card) 65'	Report	Layún (yellow card) 12'; Correa 15'; Sarabia (yellow card) 67'	Stadium: La Rosaleda; Attendance: 15,516; Referee: Carlos del Cerro Grande

3 March 2018 27	Leganés	2–0	Málaga	Leganés
18:30 CET (UTC+01:00)	Amrabat (yellow card) 31', (goal) 62'; Eraso 55'	Report	Ideye (yellow card) 85'	Stadium: Butarque; Attendance: 5,970; Referee: Ignacio Iglesias Villanueva

10 March 2018 28	Málaga	0–2	Barcelona	Málaga
20:45 CET (UTC+01:00)	Samu (red card) 30'; Iturra (yellow card) 49'	Report	L. Suárez 15', (yellow card) 84'; Coutinho 28'	Stadium: La Rosaleda; Attendance: 26,936; Referee: Juan Martínez Munuera

18 March 2018 29	Celta Vigo	0–0	Málaga	Vigo
18:30 CEST (UTC+02:00)	Aspas (yellow card) 45'; Mallo (yellow card) 57'; Jonny (yellow card) 61'	Report	Rosales (yellow card) 42'; Torres (yellow card) 45'	Stadium: Balaídos; Attendance: 17,353; Referee: Alberto Undiano Mallenco

1 April 2018 30	Málaga	1–0	Villarreal	Málaga
18:30 CEST (UTC+02:00)	Castro 37' (pen.); Lacen (yellow card) 66'; Torres (yellow card) 77'	Report	Costa (yellow card) 20'; Asenjo (yellow card) 36'; Soriano (yellow card) 47'	Stadium: La Rosaleda; Attendance: 19,345; Referee: Alfonso Álvarez Izquierdo

6 April 2018 31	Deportivo La Coruña	3–2	Málaga	A Coruña
21:00 CEST (UTC+02:00)	Pérez 6' (pen.); Muntari (yellow card) 34'; Guilherme (yellow card) 48'; Çolak (yellow card) 51'; Adrián 70', 85'; Rubén (yellow card) 90'	Report	Miquel (yellow card) 16'; Guilherme 41' (o.g.); Hernández (yellow card) 43'; Torres (yellow card) 52'; Rolán 73'	Stadium: Riazor; Attendance: 17,066; Referee: Antonio Mateu Lahoz

15 April 2018 32	Málaga	1–2	Real Madrid	Málaga
20:45 CEST (UTC+02:00)	Ricca (yellow card) 36'; Iturra (yellow card) 55'; Rodríguez (yellow card) 81'; Rosales (yellow card) 90+2'; Rolán 90+3'	Report	Isco 29'; Casemiro 63'	Stadium: La Rosaleda; Attendance: 27,117; Referee: Ricardo de Burgos Bengoetxea

19 April 2018 33	Levante	1–0	Málaga	Valencia
21:30 CEST (UTC+02:00)	Lerma (yellow card) 37'; Boateng 90+3'	Report	Adrián (yellow card) 90+2'	Stadium: Ciutat de València; Attendance: 16,710; Referee: Santiago Jaime Latre

22 April 2018 34	Málaga	2–0	Real Sociedad	Málaga
16:15 CEST (UTC+02:00)	Adrián 11', (yellow card) 68'; Lestienne (yellow card) 26'; Iturra (yellow card) 30'; En-Nesyri 35'; Keko (yellow card) 64'	Report	Canales 43'	Stadium: La Rosaleda; Attendance: 14,487; Referee: Xavier Estrada Fernández

30 April 2018 35	Real Betis	2–1	Málaga	Seville
21:00 CEST (UTC+02:00)	Durmisi 24'; Joaquín (yellow card) 62'; Fabián 73'	Report	Adrián (yellow card) 10'; En-Nesyri 20'; Hernández (yellow card) 75'; Miquel (yellow card) 80'; Samu (yellow card) 90+4'	Stadium: Benito Villamarín; Attendance: 53,061; Referee: Carlos del Cerro Grande

6 May 2018 36	Málaga	0–3	Alavés	Málaga
12:00 CEST (UTC+02:00)	González (yellow card) 61'; Rosales (yellow card) 79'	Report	M. García 3'; Diéguez (yellow card) 34'; Demirović 68'; Ibai 70'	Stadium: La Rosaleda; Attendance: 14,024; Referee: José González González

13 May 2018 37	Espanyol	4–1	Málaga	Cornellà de Llobregat
16:15 CEST (UTC+02:00)	Gerard 8'; García 27'; Baptistão 30'; Piatti 79' (pen.)	Report	Adrián 39' (pen.); Miquel (yellow card) 67'; Rosales (yellow card) 73'	Stadium: RCDE Stadium; Attendance: 15,054; Referee: Juan Martínez Munuera

19 May 2018 38	Málaga	0–1	Getafe	Málaga
18:30 CEST (UTC+02:00)	Hernández (yellow card) 35'; Adrián (yellow card) 54'; González (yellow card) 73'; Iturra (yellow card) 83'	Report	Rémy 73' (pen.); Ángel (yellow card) 79'	Stadium: La Rosaleda; Attendance: 10,064; Referee: Daniel Trujillo Suárez

=== Copa del Rey ===
==== Round of 32 ====
24 October 2017	Numancia	2–1	Málaga	Soria
19:30	Nacho 90+3'; Escassi 90+5'	Report	Hernández (yellow card) 16'; Recio 21', (yellow card) 24'; Robles (yellow card) 44'; Ontiveros (yellow card) 80'	Stadium: Los Pajaritos; Attendance: 3,403; Referee: Alfonso Álvarez Izquierdo

28 November 2017	Málaga	1–1 (2–3 agg.)	Numancia	Málaga
19:30	Adrián 18'; Ontiveros (yellow card) 23'; Jony (yellow card) 85'	Report	Elgezabal 53'	Stadium: La Rosaleda; Attendance: 13,326; Referee: José María Sánchez Martínez

== Statistics ==
=== Appearances and goals ===
Last updated on 19 May 2018.

No.	Pos	Nat	Player	Total		La Liga		Copa del Rey	
No.	Pos	Nat	Player	Apps	Goals	Apps	Goals	Apps	Goals
Goalkeepers
1	GK	(Spain) ESP	Roberto	34	0	34	0	0	0
13	GK	(Spain) ESP	Andrés Prieto	6	0	4	0	2	0
	GK	(Turkey) TUR	Cenk Gönen	0	0	0	0	0	0
Defenders
2	DF	(Spain) ESP	Ignasi Miquel	20	0	20	0	0	0
3	DF	(Spain) ESP	Diego González	18	1	17+1	1	0	0
4	DF	(Spain) ESP	Luis Hernández	38	0	36	0	2	0
15	DF	(Uruguay) URU	Federico Ricca	14	0	13+1	0	0	0
18	DF	(Venezuela) VEN	Roberto Rosales	36	1	35	1	0+1	0
23	DF	(Spain) ESP	Miguel Torres	8	0	8	0	0	0
27	DF	(Spain) ESP	Álex Robles	3	0	1	0	2	0
29	DF	(Spain) ESP	Ian Pino	1	0	0	0	1	0
35	DF	(Spain) ESP	Iván Rodríguez	1	0	0+1	0	0	0
37	DF	(Spain) ESP	Alberto López	1	0	0+1	0	0	0
Midfielders
5	MF	(Argentina) ARG	Esteban Rolón	10	0	6+2	0	1+1	0
6	MF	(Serbia) SRB	Zdravko Kuzmanović	8	0	6+2	0	0	0
7	MF	(Chile) CHI	Manuel Iturra	20	0	18+2	0	0	0
8	MF	(Spain) ESP	Adrián	31	4	27+2	3	2	1
10	MF	(Venezuela) VEN	Juanpi	17	0	5+11	0	1	0
11	MF	(Uruguay) URU	Chory Castro	26	4	26	4	0	0
14	MF	(Spain) ESP	Recio	23	2	21+1	1	1	1
20	MF	(Spain) ESP	Keko	21	0	15+6	0	0	0
22	MF	(Belgium) BEL	Maxime Lestienne	12	0	8+4	0	0	0
25	MF	(Algeria) ALG	Mehdi Lacen	15	0	12+3	0	0	0
Forwards
9	FW	(Spain) ESP	Borja Bastón	22	2	8+12	2	2	0
12	FW	(Nigeria) NGR	Brown Ideye	13	1	8+5	1	0	0
16	FW	(Venezuela) VEN	Adalberto Peñaranda	13	0	11+2	0	0	0
17	FW	(Nigeria) NGR	Isaac Success	9	0	7+2	0	0	0
19	FW	(Spain) ESP	Alberto Bueno	11	0	1+10	0	0	0
24	FW	(Uruguay) URU	Diego Rolán	27	5	21+5	5	0+1	0
26	FW	(Morocco) MAR	Youssef En-Nesyri	26	4	16+9	4	0+1	0
38	FW	(Argentina) ARG	Juan Cruz	1	0	0+1	0	0	0
Players who have made an appearance or had a squad number this season but have left the club
2	DF	(Burkina Faso) BFA	Bakary Koné	0	0	0	0	0	0
7	DF	(Spain) ESP	Juankar	10	0	9+1	0	0	0
12	DF	(Spain) ESP	Cifu	4	0	1+1	0	2	0
17	MF	(Spain) ESP	Javi Ontiveros	14	0	1+11	0	2	0
19	MF	(Argentina) ARG	Emanuel Cecchini	3	0	0+2	0	1	0
21	MF	(Spain) ESP	Jony	7	0	1+4	0	2	0
22	DF	(France) FRA	Paul Baysse	16	1	13+2	1	1	0
28	MF	(Spain) ESP	Álex Mula	13	0	7+4	0	0+2	0
29	DF	(Spain) ESP	Luis Muñoz	0	0	0	0	0	0

=== Cards ===
Accounts for all competitions. Last updated on 19 December 2017.

No.	Pos.	Name	Yellow card	Red card
3	DF	(Spain) Diego González	1	0
4	DF	(Spain) Luis Hernández	5	0
5	MF	(Argentina) Esteban Rolón	1	0
6	MF	(Serbia) Zdravko Kuzmanović	1	1
7	MF	(Spain) Juankar	2	0
8	MF	(Spain) Adrián	5	0
9	FW	(Spain) Borja Bastón	2	0
10	MF	(Venezuela) Juanpi	1	0
11	MF	(Uruguay) Chory Castro	3	0
14	MF	(Spain) Recio	7	1
15	DF	(Uruguay) Federico Ricca	2	0
16	FW	(Venezuela) Adalberto Peñaranda	3	0
17	MF	(Spain) Javi Ontiveros	5	0
18	DF	(Venezuela) Roberto Rosales	5	0
19	MF	(Argentina) Emanuel Cecchini	2	0
20	MF	(Spain) Keko	1	0
21	MF	(Spain) Jony	2	0
22	DF	(France) Paul Baysse	1	0
27	DF	(Spain) Álex Robles	1	0
28	MF	(Spain) Álex Mula	1	0

=== Clean sheets ===
Last updated on 19 December 2017.

Number	Nation	Name	Matches Played	La Liga	Copa del Rey	Total
1	(Spain)	Roberto	15	2	0	2
13	(Turkey)	Cenk Gönen	0	0	0	0
25	(Spain)	Andrés Prieto	3	0	0	0
TOTALS				2	0	2
