= Andrés Prieto =

Andrés Prieto may refer to:

- Andrés Prieto (footballer, born 1928), Chilean footballer
- Andrés Prieto (footballer, born 1993), Spanish footballer
