= Víctor Cea =

Spanish football manager (born 1984)

Personal information
- Full name: Víctor Cea Zurita
- Date of birth: 21 May 1984 (age 42)
- Place of birth: San Sebastián de los Reyes, Spain

Team information
- Current team: Real Madrid C (manager)

Managerial career
- Years: Team
- 2000–2007: Juventud Sanse (youth)
- 2007–2012: Alcobendas (youth)
- 2012–2013: SS Reyes B
- 2013–2014: Madridejos
- 2014–2018: Unión Adarve
- 2018: Cultural Leonesa
- 2019: Qatar U19
- 2019: Melilla
- 2020–2022: Talavera
- 2023: UCAM Murcia
- 2024–2025: Espanyol B
- 2026–: Real Madrid C

Víctor Cea Zurita (born 21 May 1984) is a Spanish football manager, who is currently in charge of Real Madrid C.

== Career ==
Born in San Sebastián de los Reyes, Community of Madrid, Cea began his career at the age of 17 with hometown side CEF Juventud Sanse, being in charge of the youth categories. In 2007, he moved to Alcobendas CF, and led their Juvenil side to a first-ever promotion to the División de Honor Juvenil in 2012.

In 2012, Cea had his first senior managerial experience, after joining UD San Sebastián de los Reyes and taking over the reserves in Preferente de Madrid. On 27 December 2013, he was named manager of Tercera División side CD Madridejos.

In June 2014, Cea left Madridejos after narrowly avoiding relegation, and signed for fellow fourth division side AD Unión Adarve. He led the club to a first-ever promotion to Segunda División B in 2017, and reached 150 matches in charge in February 2018.

On 11 June 2018, Cea left Adarve after being appointed at the helm of Cultural y Deportiva Leonesa, recently relegated to division three. On 17 December, he was dismissed despite leaving the club in the fourth position after a 2–1 away win over Deportivo Fabril, four points shy of the first place.

On 1 July 2019, after a brief stint with the Qatar national under-19 team, Cea was presented as manager of UD Melilla. He was dismissed on 5 November, after three wins in 11 matches.

On 16 July 2020, Cea was presented as manager of CF Talavera de la Reina also in division three. Despite managing to qualify the club to the new Primera División RFEF, he was sacked on 7 April 2022, after a poor run of results.

On 29 March 2023, Cea was named in charge of Segunda Federación side UCAM Murcia CF. He missed out promotion in the play-offs in his first season, and was relieved from his duties on 12 December.

On 18 September 2024, Cea took over RCD Espanyol's reserves also in division four. The following 11 June, he left by mutual consent.

On 13 January 2026, after more than seven months without a club, Cea returned to the fourth division as he was named as the manager of the C-team at Real Madrid.

== Managerial statistics ==
As of 26 April 2026

Managerial record by team and tenure
Team	Nat	From	To	Record								Ref
Team	Nat	From	To	G	W	D	L	GF	GA	GD	Win %	Ref
SS Reyes B	(Spain)	1 July 2012	30 June 2013	34	16	9	9	52	41	+11	47.06	
Madridejos	(Spain)	27 December 2013	11 June 2014	19	5	10	4	15	11	+4	26.32	
Unión Adarve	(Spain)	11 June 2014	11 June 2018	162	71	42	49	205	167	+38	43.83	
Cultural Leonesa	(Spain)	11 June 2018	17 December 2018	22	10	6	6	31	22	+9	45.45	
Melilla	(Spain)	1 July 2019	5 November 2019	11	3	4	4	11	17	−6	27.27	
Talavera	(Spain)	14 July 2020	7 April 2022	56	18	15	23	68	73	−5	32.14	
UCAM Murcia	(Spain)	29 March 2023	12 December 2023	27	12	7	8	31	19	+12	44.44	
Espanyol B	(Spain)	18 September 2024	11 June 2025	31	12	12	7	38	30	+8	38.71	
Real Madrid C	(Spain)	13 January 2026	Present	15	7	2	6	21	20	+1	46.67	
Total				377	154	107	116	472	400	+72	40.85	—
