= Enrique Castaño =

Spanish footballer

Personal information
- Full name: Enrique Castaño Cervera
- Date of birth: 23 January 1993 (age 33)
- Place of birth: Las Palmas, Spain
- Height: 1.79 m (5 ft 10 in)
- Position: Midfielder

Team information
- Current team: Atlético Paso

Youth career
- 2000–2007: Huracán
- 2007–2012: Real Madrid

Senior career*
Years	Team	Apps	(Gls)
2011–2012	Real Madrid C	1	(0)
2012–2013	Alcorcón B	32	(3)
2012–2013	Alcorcón	2	(0)
2013–2017	Las Palmas B	51	(3)
2015–2016	→ Mérida (loan)	5	(0)
2017–2019	Lanzarote	14	(0)
2019–2020	Avilés	19	(2)
2020–2021	Gran Tarajal	23	(1)
2021–2022	San Fernando	31	(1)
2022–2023	Unión Puerto	29	(2)
2023–2025	Unión Sur Yaiza	44	(1)
2025–	Atlético Paso	0	(0)

International career
2009	Spain U16	3	(1)
2009	Spain U17	4	(0)
- * Club domestic league appearances and goals as of 1 July 2025

Enrique Castaño Cervera (born 23 January 1993) is a Spanish footballer who plays for Tercera Federación club Atlético Paso as a midfielder.

== Club career ==
Castaño was born in Las Palmas, Canary Islands. After starting out with AD Huracán's, he completed his formation with Real Madrid, joining its youth system in 2007 at the age of 14. He made his senior debut on 13 May 2012, playing with the C-team against CF Trival Valderas.

In the 2012 summer Castaño joined AD Alcorcón, initially being assigned to the reserves. On 2 February 2013 he appeared in his first game as a professional, playing 20 minutes against in a 0–3 away loss against Hércules CF.

On 2 September 2013 Castaño joined another reserve team, UD Las Palmas Atlético, in Segunda División B.

On 30 June 2019, Castaño signed a one-year contract with fourth division team Real Avilés CF.
