= Derik Osede =

Spanish footballer

Derik
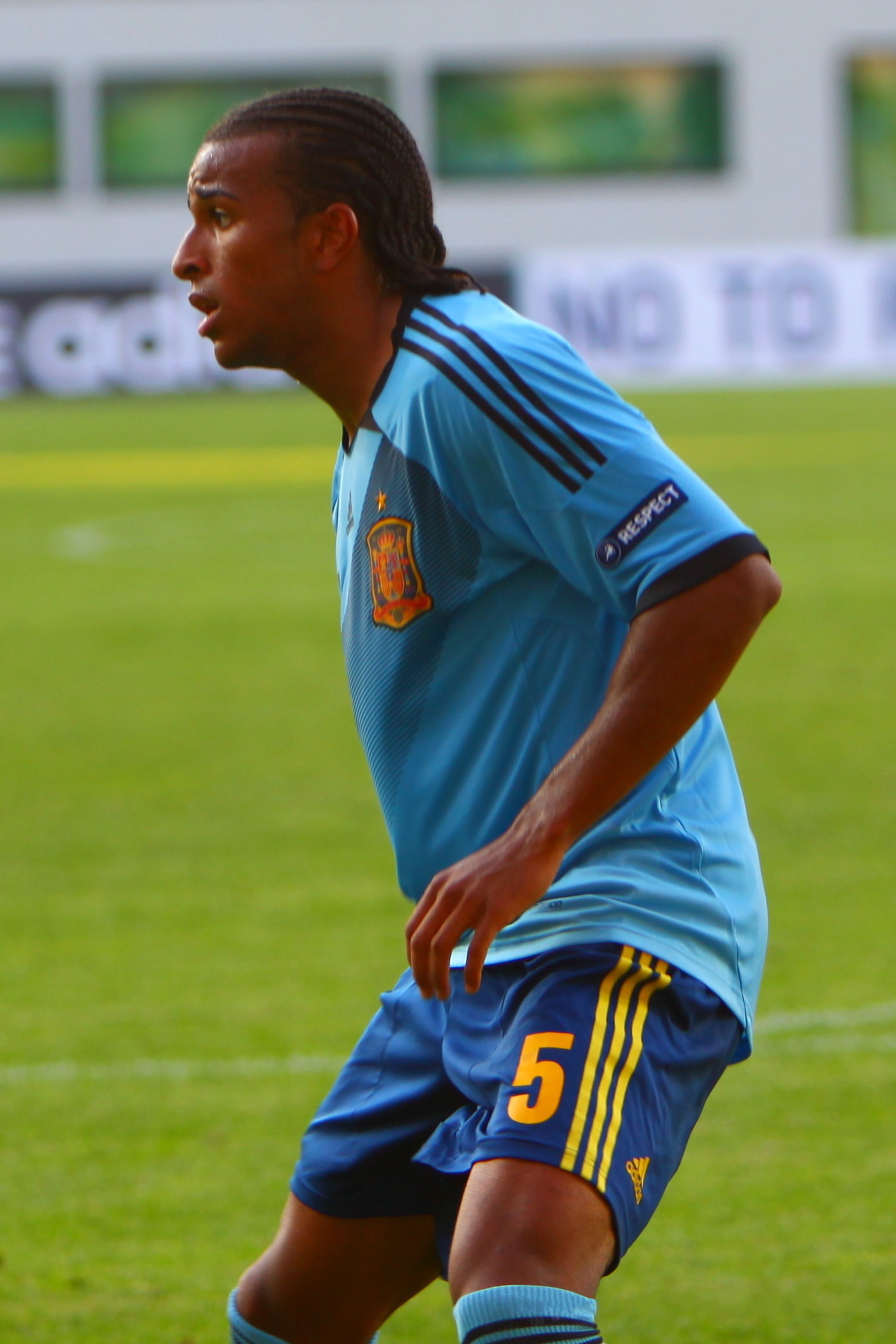
- Osede with Spain U19 in 2012

Personal information
- Full name: Derik Osede Prieto
- Date of birth: 21 February 1993 (age 33)
- Place of birth: Madrid, Spain
- Height: 1.83 m (6 ft 0 in)
- Position: Centre-back

Team information
- Current team: Barbastro
- Number: 5

Youth career
- 2001–2002: Santa Ana
- 2002–2011: Real Madrid

Senior career*
Years	Team	Apps	(Gls)
2011–2013	Real Madrid C	49	(1)
2012–2015	Real Madrid B	51	(1)
2015–2018	Bolton Wanderers	65	(0)
2018–2020	Numancia	36	(2)
2020–2021	Deportivo La Coruña	8	(0)
2022	Alcoyano	0	(0)
2023	Pontevedra	14	(0)
2023	Waterford	8	(0)
2024	Inter Turku	7	(0)
2026–	Barbastro	13	(0)

International career
2009	Spain U16	3	(0)
2009	Spain U17	4	(1)
2011	Spain U18	2	(0)
2012	Spain U19	9	(1)
2013	Spain U20	8	(2)
2014	Spain U21	1	(0)
- * Club domestic league appearances and goals as of 15 May 2026

Derik Osede Prieto (born 21 February 1993), known simply as Derik, is a Spanish professional footballer who plays as a central defender for Segunda Federación club Barbastro.

== Club career ==
=== Real Madrid ===
Born in Madrid to a Nigerian father and a Spanish mother, Derik started playing organised football at the age of eight, joining local club DAV Santa Ana's youth ranks. He finished his development at Real Madrid, going on to make his debut as a senior with the C team and helping them return to Segunda División B in 2012.

Derik was called to Real Madrid Castilla for the 2012 preseason, but still appeared in some more matches for the C's. His first competitive appearance for the reserves took place on 20 October 2012, playing the full 90 minutes in a 1–0 away loss to Córdoba CF in the Segunda División.

On 1 February 2014, Derik scored his first professional goal to open a 4–0 win against Hércules CF at the Alfredo di Stéfano Stadium. The season ended with relegation, with 18 games (17 starts) from the player.

=== Bolton Wanderers ===
On 6 July 2015, after a further two full seasons with Madrid B, free agent Derik signed a three-year contract for Bolton Wanderers after a successful trial. He made his debut in the Football League Championship on 12 September, playing the whole of a 2–1 home victory over Wolverhampton Wanderers.

Derik finished his first year with exactly half of the league matches played, as the team were relegated after ranking last. He scored his first goal for them on 9 August 2017, in a 2–1 away defeat of Crewe Alexandra in the EFL Cup.

On 24 May 2018, it was confirmed that Derik would leave the Macron Stadium on 30 June.

=== Numancia ===
Derik joined Spanish second-division side CD Numancia on 26 November 2018 on a two-year deal, after impressing on a trial basis. He did not debut until the following 12 January, when he played the whole of a 1–1 draw at CF Reus Deportiu.

Derik scored his first goal for the club from Soria on 18 September 2019, as they came from behind to draw 3–3 at Deportivo de La Coruña. He left in July 2020 as his contract expired, after suffering relegation.

=== Deportivo ===
On 5 October 2020, free agent Derik moved to also-relegated Deportivo on a one-year deal. His time in Galicia was fraught with injuries to his Achilles tendon.

=== Later career ===
Derik subsequently competed in the newly created Primera Federación, first with CD Alcoyano then Pontevedra CF. On 6 September 2023, he signed for League of Ireland First Division club Waterford.

On 5 February 2024, Osede joined FC Inter Turku in the Finnish Veikkausliiga.

== International career ==
Derik appeared with the Spain under-19 team at the 2012 UEFA European Championship, helping to a final win in Estonia. With the under-20 side at the 2013 FIFA World Cup in Turkey, he scored in a 2–1 victory over Mexico in the last 16.

In June 2015, Derik stated he wished to switch international allegiance to Nigeria.

== Career statistics ==
As of 23 October 2024

Appearances and goals by club, season and competition
Club	Season	League			National Cup		League Cup		Other		Total	
Club	Season	Division	Apps	Goals	Apps	Goals	Apps	Goals	Apps	Goals	Apps	Goals
Real Madrid C	2011–12	Tercera División	34	1	—		—		2 (Note: Appearances in Tercera División promotion playoffs)	0	36	1
Real Madrid C	2012–13	Segunda División B	15	0	—		—		—		15	0
Real Madrid C	Total		49	1	0	0	0	0	2	0	51	1
Real Madrid B	2012–13	Segunda División	11	0	—		—		—		11	0
Real Madrid B	2013–14	Segunda División	18	1	—		—		—		18	1
Real Madrid B	2014–15	Segunda División B	22	0	—		—		—		22	0
Real Madrid B	Total		51	1	0	0	0	0	0	0	51	1
Bolton Wanderers	2015–16	Championship	23	0	0	0	0	0	—		23	0
Bolton Wanderers	2016–17	League One	25	0	1	0	1	0	1 (Note: Appearance in EFL Trophy)	0	28	0
Bolton Wanderers	2017–18	Championship	17	0	1	1	2	1	—		20	2
Bolton Wanderers	Total		65	0	2	1	3	1	1	0	71	2
Numancia	2018–19	Segunda División	11	0	0	0	—		—		11	0
Numancia	2019–20	Segunda División	25	2	1	0	—		—		26	2
Numancia	Total		36	2	1	0	0	0	0	0	37	2
Deportivo La Coruña	2020–21	Primera Federación	8	0	1	0	—		—		9	0
Alcoyano	2021–22	Primera Federación	0	0	0	0	—		—		0	0
Pontevedra	2022–23	Primera Federación	14	0	1	0	—		—		15	0
Waterford	2023	League of Ireland	8	0	0	0	0	0	—		8	0
Inter Turku	2024	Veikkausliiga	7	0	4	1	2	0	–		13	1
Career total			232	4	6	1	3	1	3	0	244	6

== Honours ==
Spain U19

- UEFA European Under-19 Championship: 2012
