= Oliver Cuadrado =

Spanish footballer

Oliver
Personal information
- Full name: Oliver Cuadrado Martín
- Date of birth: 12 July 1977 (age 49)
- Place of birth: Madrid, Spain
- Height: 1.83 m (6 ft 0 in)
- Position: Goalkeeper

Youth career
- 1988–1996: Real Madrid

Senior career*
Years	Team	Apps	(Gls)
1996–1997	Real Madrid C	26	(0)
1997–2000	Real Madrid B	52	(0)
2000–2003	Compostela	42	(0)
2003–2004	Toledo	21	(0)
2004–2005	Guadalajara		
2005–2006	Juventus Zürich		
2006–2007	Extremadura	3	(0)
2007–2008	Toledo	30	(0)
2008–2010	Móstoles	44	(0)
2010–2014	Alcobendas Sport	60	(0)
- * Club domestic league appearances and goals

Oliver Cuadrado Martín (born 12 July 1977), known simply as Oliver, is a Spanish former professional footballer who played as a goalkeeper.

== Club career ==
Born in Madrid, Oliver spent 12 years connected to local – and La Liga – giants Real Madrid. He only appeared with their B and C sides during his tenure, even though he occasionally trained with the first team managed by Vicente del Bosque; he was included in the latter's squad for the 2000 FIFA Club World Championship.

Oliver signed with SD Compostela of Segunda División in August 2000 after leaving the Santiago Bernabéu Stadium, appearing in 14 league matches in his first season, which ended in relegation. After being first-choice as the Galician club returned to where it came from, he was again backup in the 2002–03 campaign, with Compos again dropping down a league in spite of having finished ninth; following a 2–1 loss against relegation-threatened Córdoba CF on 15 June 2003, he was accused of having been paid to help the visitors win (not holding an easy shot attempt in the Andalusians' second goal), but nothing was ever proved.

Subsequently, Oliver resumed his career in the Segunda División B but also Tercera División, also having a spell in Switzerland with SC Young Fellows Juventus.
