= Felipe Vaqueriza =

Spanish footballer (born 1975)

Personal information
- Full name: Felipe Vaqueriza Rodríguez
- Date of birth: 23 January 1975 (age 51)
- Place of birth: Madrid, Spain
- Height: 1.76 m (5 ft 9 1/2 in)
- Position: Centre back

Youth career
- 1985–1994: Real Madrid

Senior career*
| Years | Team | Apps | (Gls) |
| 1994–1995 | Real Madrid C | 34 | (2) |
| 1993–1998 | Real Madrid B | 97 | (3) |
| 1998–1999 | Mallorca B | 40 | (0) |
| 1999–2002 | Murcia | 90 | (0) |
| 2002–2005 | Gimnàstic | 45 | (0) |
| 2006–2007 | Ofigevi | | |
| Total | | 306 | (5) |

International career
| 1989–1990 | Spain U16 | 9 | (1) |
| 1990–1991 | Spain U17 | 6 | (0) |
| 1997 | Spain U23 | 3 | (0) |
Medal record
Men's football
Representing Spain
FIFA World U-17
| Runner-up | 1991 Italy |
- * Club domestic league appearances and goals

Felipe Vaqueriza Rodríguez (born 23 January 1975, in Madrid) is a Spanish former footballer who played as a central defender.

== Honours ==
Spain U17

- FIFA U-17 World Cup: Runner-up 1991
