= Gabri Valero =

Spanish footballer (born 2007)

Personal information
- Full name: Gabriel Valero Carretero
- Date of birth: 3 August 2007 (age 19)
- Place of birth: Menorca, Spain
- Position: Winger

Team information
- Current team: Real Madrid C
- Number: 20

Youth career
- 2013–2017: Pozuelo
- 2017–2020: EFMO Boadilla
- 2020–2021: Las Rozas
- 2021–2026: Real Madrid

Senior career*
Years	Team	Apps	(Gls)
2026–	Real Madrid C	5	(0)
- * Club domestic league appearances and goals as of 05:52, 25 July 2026 (UTC)

Gabriel Valero Carretero (born 3 August 2007) is a Spanish footballer who plays as a winger for Real Madrid Juvenil A.

== Club career ==
=== Youth career ===
Valero started his youth career at Pozuelo academy. He also played at the youth systems of Boadilla and Las Rozas before joining Real Madrid in 2021. Since joining the club, Valero has progressively moved through the club's youth teams. In 2026, Valero was part of Real Madrid's UEFA Youth League-winning side and played a key role in the team's Copa de Campeones title-winning campaign.

=== Senior career ===
On 25 January 2026, Valero made his debut for Real Madrid C, starting in a 2–1 win against Intercity.

== Style of play ==
Valero plays as a right winger. He is explosive, vertical, and is particularly known for his dribbling ability and his ability to create unconventional attacking situations.

== Career statistics ==
As of 25 July 2026

Appearances and goals by club, season and competition
Club	Season	League			Other		Total	
Club	Season	Division	Apps	Goals	Apps	Goals	Apps	Goals
Real Madrid C	2025–26	Segunda Federación	5	0	0	0	5	0
Career total			5	0	0	0	5	0
