= Illia Voloshyn =

Ukrainian footballer (born 2007)

Personal information
- Full name: Illia Yaroslavovych Voloshyn
- Date of birth: 15 January 2007 (age 19)
- Place of birth: Novomoskovsk, Ukraine
- Height: 2.02 m (6 ft 8 in)
- Position: Goalkeeper

Team information
- Current team: Real Madrid C
- Number: 13

Youth career
- –2022: DVUFK Dnipro
- 2022–2023: Novelda
- 2023: Dénia
- 2023–2024: Rayo Majadahonda
- 2024–: Real Madrid

Senior career*
Years	Team	Apps	(Gls)
2025–	Real Madrid C	0	(0)

International career^{‡}
2023	Ukraine U16	2	(0)
2024	Ukraine U17	1	(0)
2025	Ukraine U20	1	(0)
- * Club domestic league appearances and goals ‡ National team caps and goals as of 22 March 2025

Illia Yaroslavovych Voloshyn (Ukrainian: Ілля Ярославович Волошин; born 15 January 2007) is a Ukrainian professional footballer who plays as a goalkeeper for Real Madrid C.

== Early life ==
Voloshun was born on 15 January 2007 in Novomoskovsk, Ukraine. On 25 April 2022, he moved to Spain due to the Russian invasion of Ukraine. However, his mother was unable to move with him.

== Club career ==
As a youth player, Voloshyn joined the youth academy of Ukrainian side DVUFK Dnipro. In 2022, he joined the youth academy of Spanish side Novelda before joining the youth academy of Spanish side Dénia in 2023. The same year, he joined the youth academy of Spanish side Rayo Majadahonda.

Six months later, he joined the youth academy of Spanish La Liga side Real Madrid and was promoted to the club's C team in 2025. Spanish news website DAZN wrote in 2024 that he was "one of the most promising goalkeepers on the European scene".

== International career ==
Voloshyn is a Ukraine youth international. During March 2024, he played for the Ukraine national under-17 football team for 2024 UEFA European Under-17 Championship qualification.

== Style of play ==
Voloshyn plays as a goalkeeper and is left-footed. Spanish newspaper Diario AS wrote in 2024 that he "combines considerable size... and outstanding footwork".
