= Burgui =

Spanish footballer (born 1993)

Personal information
- Full name: Jorge Franco Alviz
- Date of birth: 29 October 1993 (age 32)
- Place of birth: Burguillos del Cerro, Spain
- Height: 1.84 m (6 ft 0 in)
- Position: Winger

Youth career
- 2003–2010: Burguillos
- 2010–2011: Cacereño
- 2011–2012: Diocesano

Senior career*
Years	Team	Apps	(Gls)
2012–2013	Real Madrid C	38	(8)
2013–2017	Real Madrid B	74	(12)
2015–2016	→ Espanyol (loan)	26	(1)
2016–2017	→ Sporting Gijón (loan)	32	(2)
2017–2021	Alavés	42	(2)
2020	→ Zaragoza (loan)	16	(1)
2022–2023	Šibenik	8	(1)
- * Club domestic league appearances and goals as of 22:37, 4 January 2023 (UTC)

Jorge Franco Alviz (born 29 October 1993), known as Burgui (Spanish pronunciation: [ˈbuɾɣi]), is a Spanish professional footballer who plays as a left winger.

== Club career ==
=== Real Madrid ===
Born in Burguillos del Cerro, Province of Badajoz, Extremadura, Burgui joined hometown club CD Burguillos' youth setup in 2003, aged 10. In 2010 he moved to CP Cacereño, and signed with CD Diocesano the following year.

After scoring 26 goals with the Juvenil squad, Burgui joined Real Madrid in March 2012, with the deal being made effective in June. He made his senior debut with the C team in the 2012–13 season, in Segunda División B.

Burgui first appeared with the reserves on 2 June 2013, coming on as a substitute for Juanfran in the 68th minute of a 4–0 home win against AD Alcorcón in the Segunda División. For the following campaign, he was definitely promoted to the B side.

On 21 September 2013, Burgui scored his first professional goal, but in a 1–2 home loss to Real Zaragoza. On 11 May of the following year he appeared on the bench with the first team, remaining unused in a 2–0 La Liga defeat at RC Celta de Vigo.

On 3 July 2015, Burgui was loaned to RCD Espanyol in a season-long deal. He made his debut in La Liga on 22 August, replacing Álvaro González in a 1–0 home victory over Getafe CF, and scored his first goal for the club on 15 December by equalising in a 2–1 defeat of Levante UD also at the Estadi Cornellà-El Prat, in the second leg of the last 32 of the Copa del Rey (3–2 aggregate).

Burgui's first league goal came on 27 February 2016, levelling again in a 4–2 win away to Sporting de Gijón. On 11 July, he was loaned to precisely that opponent for one year.

=== Alavés ===
On 11 July 2017, after suffering relegation, Burgui signed a permanent four-year contract with fellow top-tier club Deportivo Alavés. On 13 February 2020, he was loaned to Real Zaragoza of the second division until the end of the season.

Burgui was rarely played during his spell at Mendizorrotza Stadium, mainly due to an anterior cruciate ligament injury.

=== Šibenik ===
Burgui moved abroad for the first time in February 2022, joining HNK Šibenik of the Croatian Football League until June 2023.

== Career statistics ==
As of match played 21 February 2021

Appearances and goals by club, season and competition
Club	Season	League			National Cup		Other		Total	
Club	Season	Division	Apps	Goals	Apps	Goals	Apps	Goals	Apps	Goals
Real Madrid C	2012–13	Segunda División B	38	8	—		—		38	8
Real Madrid B	2012–13	Segunda División	1	0	—		—		1	0
Real Madrid B	2013–14	Segunda División	36	5	—		—		36	5
Real Madrid B	2014–15	Segunda División B	37	7	—		—		37	7
Real Madrid B	Total		74	12	0	0	0	0	74	12
Real Madrid	2013–14	La Liga	0	0	0	0	—		0	0
Espanyol (loan)	2015–16	La Liga	26	1	4	1	—		30	2
Sporting Gijón (loan)	2016–17	La Liga	32	2	2	0	—		34	2
Alavés	2017–18	La Liga	23	1	2	0	—		25	1
Alavés	2018–19	La Liga	16	1	2	0	—		18	1
Alavés	2019–20	La Liga	2	0	1	0	—		3	0
Alavés	2020–21	La Liga	1	0	2	0	—		3	0
Alavés	Total		42	2	7	0	0	0	49	2
Zaragoza (loan)	2019–20	Segunda División	16	1	0	0	2 (Note: Appearances in La Liga play-offs)	0	18	1
Career total			228	26	13	1	2	0	243	27
