= Cenk Gönen =

Turkish footballer (born 1988)

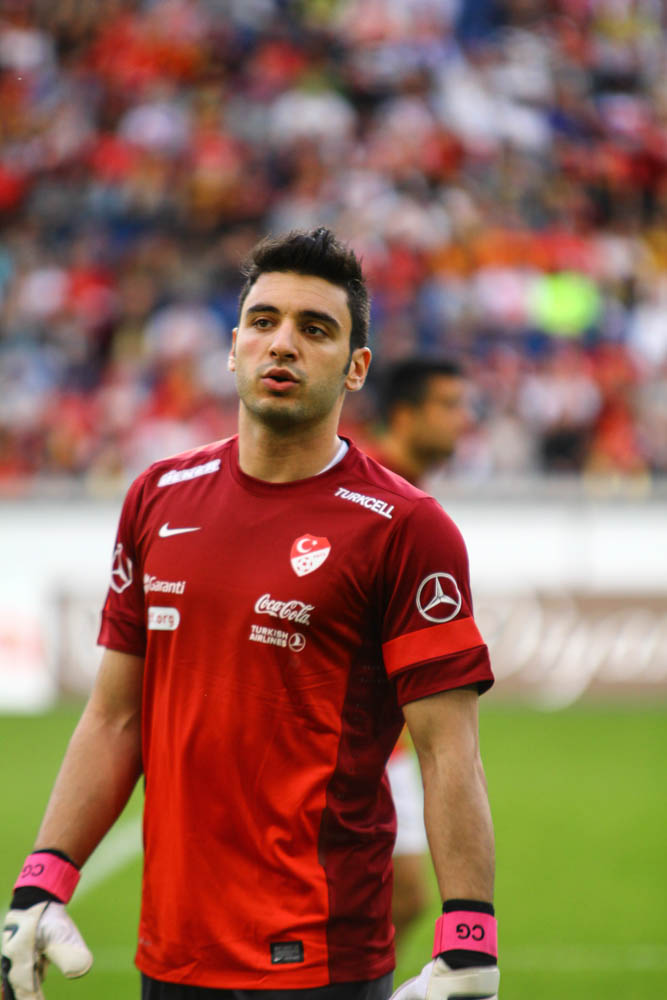
- Gönen in 2013

Personal information
- Date of birth: 21 February 1988 (age 38)
- Place of birth: İzmir, Turkey
- Height: 1.90 m (6 ft 3 in)
- Position: Goalkeeper

Youth career
- 2001–2005: Göztepe
- 2005–2006: Denizlispor

Senior career*
Years	Team	Apps	(Gls)
2006–2010	Denizlispor	35	(0)
2008	→ Altay (loan)	12	(0)
2010–2015	Beşiktaş	63	(0)
2015–2017	Galatasaray	1	(0)
2017–2019	Málaga	0	(0)
2020	Alanyaspor	1	(0)
2020–2021	Denizlispor	16	(0)
2021–2023	Kayserispor	7	(0)
2023–2024	Esenler Erokspor	6	(0)
2024–2025	Çorluspor	4	(0)

International career
2002	Turkey U15	1	(0)
2004	Turkey U16	10	(0)
2004–2005	Turkey U17	4	(0)
2006	Turkey U18	1	(0)
2009–2010	Turkey U21	5	(0)
2011	Turkey A2	2	(0)
2012–2015	Turkey	2	(0)
- * Club domestic league appearances and goals as of 21:56, 29 September 2024 (UTC)

Cenk Gönen (born 21 February 1988) is a Turkish professional footballer who plays as a goalkeeper.

== Club career ==
After a season with Denizlispor in the 2006–07 season, he secured a first-team place as a goalkeeper. In the 2007–08 season, he was given the number 1 squad number. After an impressive season with Denizlispor, Cenk was transferred to Turkish giants Beşiktaş for €1 million, plus a player in exchange. He signed a five-year contract with the club, shortly after the arrival of Hakan Arıkan.

On 22 February 2014, during a game against Galatasaray which ended 1–0 for Galatasaray, Cenk fell unconscious after colliding with teammate Pedro Franco in an attempt to dive for the ball.

== Personal life ==
Cenk is the nephew of Ali Artuner, who was also a goalkeeper for the Turkey national team.

== Career statistics ==
As of match played 29 September 2024

Appearances and goals by club, season and competition
Club	Season	League			Cup		Europe		Other		Total	
Club	Season	Division	Apps	Goals	Apps	Goals	Apps	Goals	Apps	Goals	Apps	Goals
Denizlispor	2005–06	Süper Lig	0	0	1	0	—		—		1	0
Denizlispor	2006–07	Süper Lig	0	0	0	0	—		—		0	0
Denizlispor	2007–08	Süper Lig	0	0	0	0	—		—		0	0
Denizlispor	2008–09	Süper Lig	21	0	4	0	—		—		25	0
Denizlispor	2009–10	Süper Lig	14	0	4	0	—		—		18	0
Denizlispor	Total		35	0	9	0	—		—		44	0
Altay S.K. (loan)	2007–08	Süper Lig	12	0	0	0	—		—		12	0
Beşiktaş J.K.	2010–11	Süper Lig	15	0	5	0	4 (Note: Appearance(s) in UEFA Europa League)	0	—		24	0
Beşiktaş J.K.	2011–12	Süper Lig	29	0	1	0	5	0	—		35	0
Beşiktaş J.K.	2012–13	Süper Lig	8	0	4	0	—		—		12	0
Beşiktaş J.K.	2013–14	Süper Lig	2	0	1	0	0	0	—		3	0
Beşiktaş J.K.	2014–15	Süper Lig	9	0	3	0	5	0	—		17	0
Beşiktaş J.K.	Total		63	0	14	0	14	0	—		91	0
Galatasaray	2015–16	Süper Lig	1	0	5	0	0	0	—		6	0
Galatasaray	2016–17	Süper Lig	0	0	8	0	—		0	0	8	0
Galatasaray	Total		1	0	13	0	0	0	0	0	14	0
Málaga	2017–18	La Liga	0	0	0	0	—		—		0	0
Málaga	2016–17	Segunda División	0	0	0	0	—		0	0	0	0
Málaga	Total		0	0	0	0	—		0	0	0	0
Alanyaspor	2019–20	Süper Lig	1	0	0	0	—		—		1	0
Denizlispor	2020–21	Süper Lig	16	0	1	0	—		—		17	0
Kayserispor	2021–22	Süper Lig	3	0	2	0	—		—		5	0
Kayserispor	2022–23	Süper Lig	5	0	4	0	—		—		9	0
Kayserispor	Total		8	0	6	0	—		—		14	0
Esenler Erokspor	2023–24	TFF 2. Lig	6	0	0	0	—		—		6	0
Çorluspor	2024–25	TFF 3. Lig	4	0	0	0	—		—		4	0
Career total			146	0	43	0	14	0	0	0	203	0

== Honours ==
=== Beşiktaş ===
- Türkiye Kupası (1): 2010–11

=== Galatasaray SK ===
- Türkiye Kupası (1): 2015–16
- Süper Kupa (1): 2016

=== Esenler Erokspor ===
- TFF Second League (1) 2023-24
