= Álex Robles =

Spanish footballer

Personal information
- Full name: Alejandro Robles García
- Date of birth: 28 January 1999 (age 27)
- Place of birth: Pizarra, Spain
- Height: 1.70 m (5 ft 7 in)
- Position: Right back

Youth career
- 2005–2009: Málaga
- 2009–2010: Los Cafeteras
- 2010–2016: Málaga

Senior career*
Years	Team	Apps	(Gls)
2016–2019	Málaga B	18	(0)
2017–2019	Málaga	1	(0)
2019–2021	Sevilla B	16	(1)
2020–2021	→ Córdoba (loan)	13	(1)
2021	Atlético Baleares	7	(0)
2022	Numancia	0	(0)
2022	Algeciras	4	(0)
2022–2023	El Ejido	23	(0)
2023–2025	Pizarra Atlético	37	(0)

International career
2014–2015	Spain U16	8	(0)
2015–2016	Spain U17	16	(0)
2017	Spain U18	2	(0)
2016–2018	Spain U19	6	(0)
- * Club domestic league appearances and goals as of 18 January 2025

Alejandro "Álex" Robles García (born 28 January 1999) is a Spanish footballer who plays as a right back.

== Club career ==
Born in Pizarra, Málaga, Andalusia, Robles was a Málaga CF youth graduate. He made his senior debut with the B-team on 28 August 2016, starting in a 1–0 Tercera División home win against UD Ciudad de Torredonjimeno.

On 4 September 2017, after playing the whole pre-season with the main squad, Robles extended his contract until 2020. On 24 October, he made his professional debut by starting in a 1–2 away win against CD Numancia for the season's Copa del Rey. His La Liga debut occurred the following 19 May, as he started in a 0–1 home loss against Getafe CF.

On 14 August 2019, as Málaga's financial crisis worsened, Robles moved to another reserve team, Sevilla Atlético in Segunda División B.
