= Alberto López (footballer, born 1995) =

Spanish footballer

Personal information
- Full name: Alberto López Jiménez
- Date of birth: 27 May 1995 (age 31)
- Place of birth: Granada, Spain
- Height: 1.73 m (5 ft 8 in)
- Position: Left back

Team information
- Current team: Recreativo Huelva
- Number: 21

Youth career
- 2011–2014: Málaga

Senior career*
Years	Team	Apps	(Gls)
2013–2019	Málaga B	158	(2)
2016–2017	→ Mallorca B (loan)	2	(0)
2017	→ Murcia (loan)	2	(0)
2018–2019	Málaga	1	(0)
2019–2021	Granada B	41	(0)
2021–2023	Murcia	43	(0)
2023–2024	Lugo	19	(0)
2024–	Recreativo Huelva	35	(0)
- * Club domestic league appearances and goals as of 7 May 2026

Alberto López Jiménez (born 27 May 1995) is a Spanish professional footballer who plays as a left back for Recreativo Huelva.

== Club career ==
Born in Granada, Andalusia, López joined Málaga CF's youth categories in 2011 at the age of 15. He made his senior debut for the reserves on 3 November 2013, starting in a 1–1 Tercera División away draw against CD Español del Alquián.

López scored his first senior goal on 19 April 2015, netting the game's only in an away success over Vélez CF. During the 2015–16 campaign, he contributed with 37 matches (all as a starter) and one goal as his side narrowly missed out promotion in the play-offs; he also acted as team captain during the season.

On 19 July 2016, López was loaned to Segunda División side RCD Mallorca for one year. After only featuring for the B-side in Segunda División B, he moved to fellow third-tier club Real Murcia the following 31 January, also in a temporary deal.

After appearing rarely, López returned to Málaga and its B-team. He made his first team – and La Liga – debut on 13 May 2018, coming on as a half-time substitute for Diego González in a 1–4 away loss against RCD Espanyol.
