= Andrés Prieto (footballer, born 1993) =

Spanish footballer

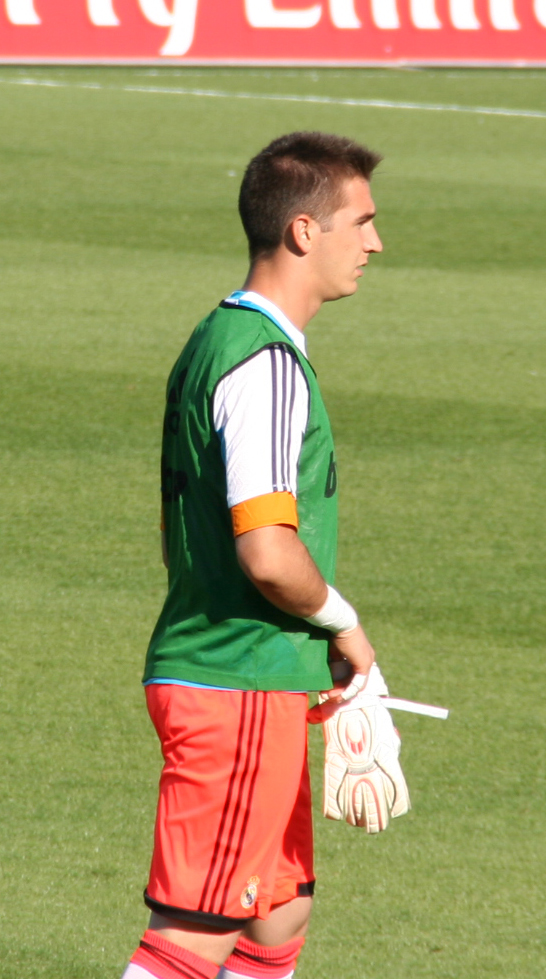
- Prieto in 2014

Personal information
- Full name: Andrés Tomás Prieto Albert
- Date of birth: 17 October 1993 (age 33)
- Place of birth: Alicante, Spain
- Height: 1.93 m (6 ft 4 in)
- Position: Goalkeeper

Team information
- Current team: Ponferradina
- Number: 1

Youth career
- 1999–2001: Maristas
- 2001–2008: Hércules
- 2008–2013: Real Madrid

Senior career*
Years	Team	Apps	(Gls)
2013	Real Madrid B	1	(0)
2013−2014	Real Madrid C	5	(0)
2014−2017	Espanyol B	80	(0)
2017−2019	Málaga	4	(0)
2019	Leganés	0	(0)
2019−2020	Espanyol	0	(0)
2020–2021	Birmingham City	0	(0)
2021–2022	Dinamo Tbilisi	33	(0)
2022–2023	Alcorcón	5	(0)
2023–	Ponferradina	101	(0)
- * Club domestic league appearances and goals as of 25 May 2026

Andrés Tomás Prieto Albert (born 17 October 1993) is a Spanish professional footballer who plays as a goalkeeper for Ponferradina.

Prieto made occasional appearances in La Liga for Málaga and in the Segunda División for Real Madrid Castilla, and played regularly at Segunda División B level over three seasons with Espanyol B, before spending a season in English football as backup goalkeeper at EFL Championship club Birmingham City.

== Football career ==
=== Early career ===
Born in Alicante, Valencian Community, Prieto joined Real Madrid's youth setup in 2008, aged 15. He was named to the C team's pre-season program in the 2012 summer, but was later demoted back to the youth squad.

Despite appearing mainly with the Juvenil A squad, Prieto made his professional debut on 13 April 2013, replacing the injured Tomás Mejías in a 3–1 away success against Recreativo de Huelva in the Segunda División championship. In May 2013, he was promoted to the C team playing in the Segunda División B, but acted mainly as a backup to Alfonso Herrero during the campaign.

On 7 August 2014, Prieto moved to another reserve team, RCD Espanyol B, also playing in the third tier. He was a regular starter during his three-year spell at the club.

=== Málaga ===
On 4 July 2017, Prieto signed a two-year deal with Málaga CF. He made his La Liga debut on 21 October 2017, starting in a 0–2 away loss against FC Barcelona.

Prieto acted mainly as backup to Roberto during his first season, which ended in relegation. On 29 January 2019, after being demoted to third choice behind new signings Munir and Paweł Kieszek, he terminated his contract with the Andalusians.

=== Leganés ===
Prieto agreed a short-term deal with CD Leganés on 29 January 2019, hours after rescinding with Málaga. However, he failed to appear for the Pepineros, being called up for just two matches and acting as a third option behind Iván Cuéllar and Andriy Lunin.

=== Return to Espanyol ===
On 19 July 2019, Prieto agreed to a two-year deal back at Espanyol, and was assigned to the main squad in the top tier. Initially a backup to Diego López, he dropped to third choice after the arrival of Oier Olazábal, and terminated his contract with the club on 28 August 2020.

=== Birmingham City ===
The same day, Prieto signed for English Championship club Birmingham City on a three-year contract with the option of a fourth. He made his debut in the opening fixture of the season, a 1–0 defeat at home to fourth-tier Cambridge United in the EFL Cup; the goal came when Prieto was outjumped at a set-piece. He was a regular on the bench behind first-choice Neil Etheridge for most of the season, but his only other first-team appearance was in the 3–0 FA Cup defeat away to Manchester City. His contract was terminated by mutual consent on 15 July 2021.

=== Dinamo Tbilisi ===
Prieto signed a two-year contract with Dinamo Tbilisi, reigning champions of the Georgian Erovnuli Liga, on 13 August 2021.

== Career statistics ==
As of match played 21 June 2025

Appearances and goals by club, season and competition
Club	Season	League			National cup (Note: Includes Copa del Rey, FA Cup, Georgian Cup)		League cup (Note: Includes EFL Cup)		Europe		Other		Total	
Club	Season	Division	Apps	Goals	Apps	Goals	Apps	Goals	Apps	Goals	Apps	Goals	Apps	Goals
Real Madrid Castilla	2012–13	Segunda División	1	0	—		—		—		—		1	0
Real Madrid C	2013–14	Segunda División B	5	0	—		—		—		—		5	0
Espanyol B	2014–15	Segunda División B	22	0	—		—		—		—		22	0
Espanyol B	2015–16	Segunda División B	28	0	—		—		—		—		28	0
Espanyol B	2016–17	Segunda División B	30	0	—		—		—		—		30	0
Espanyol B	Total		80	0	—		—		—		—		80	0
Espanyol	2014–15	La Liga	0	0	0	0	—		—		—		0	0
Espanyol	2015–16	La Liga	0	0	0	0	—		—		—		0	0
Espanyol	2016–17	La Liga	0	0	0	0	—		—		—		0	0
Espanyol	Total		0	0	0	0	—		—		—		0	0
Málaga	2017–18	La Liga	4	0	2	0	—		—		—		6	0
Málaga	2018–19	Segunda División	0	0	0	0	—		—		—		0	0
Málaga	Total		4	0	2	0	—		—		—		6	0
Leganés	2018–19	La Liga	0	0	0	0	—		—		—		0	0
Espanyol	2019–20	La Liga	0	0	3	0	—		3 (Note: Appearances in UEFA Europa League)	0	—		6	0
Birmingham City	2020–21	EFL Championship	0	0	1	0	1	0	—		—		2	0
Dinamo Tbilisi	2021	Erovnuli Liga	14	0	—		—		—		—		14	0
Dinamo Tbilisi	2022	Erovnuli Liga	19	0	0	0	—		2 (Note: Appearances in UEFA Europa Conference League)	0	—		21	0
Dinamo Tbilisi	Total		33	0	0	0	—		2	0	—		35	0
Alcorcón	2022–23	Primera Federación	5	0	2	0	—		—		0	0	7	0
Ponferradina	2023–24	Primera Federación	38	0	0	0	—		—		2	0	40	0
Ponferradina	2024–25	Primera Federación	38	0	0	0	—		—		4	0	42	0
Ponferradina	Total		76	0	0	0	—		—		6	0	82	0
Career total			204	0	8	0	1	0	5	0	6	0	224	0
