= Jorge Casado =

Spanish footballer

Personal information
- Full name: Jorge Casado Rodríguez
- Date of birth: 26 June 1989 (age 37)
- Place of birth: Madrid, Spain
- Height: 1.83 m (6 ft 0 in)
- Position: Left-back

Team information
- Current team: Guadalajara
- Number: 23

Youth career
- 1996–2000: AD Villa Rosa
- 2000–2008: Rayo Vallecano

Senior career*
Years	Team	Apps	(Gls)
2008–2010	Rayo Vallecano B	55	(0)
2010–2014	Real Madrid B	124	(8)
2014–2015	Betis	15	(0)
2015–2016	Ponferradina	35	(0)
2016–2017	Zaragoza	18	(1)
2017–2019	Xanthi	51	(2)
2020	Xanthi	17	(0)
2020–2024	Rayo Majadahonda	100	(6)
2024–	Guadalajara	47	(2)
- * Club domestic league appearances and goals as of 10 June 2026

Jorge Casado Rodríguez (born 26 June 1989) is a Spanish professional footballer who plays as a left-back for Guadalajara.

== Club career ==
Born in Madrid, Casado joined local Rayo Vallecano's youth system at the age of 11, going on to appear for every youth squad at the club. He made his senior debut with the reserves, spending two full seasons in the Tercera División.

In summer 2010, Casado signed with neighbouring Real Madrid, being assigned to the B side in the Segunda División B. He represented them at both that level and Segunda División – almost always as a starter – first appearing in the latter competition in the 2012–13 campaign.

Casado made his official debut with Real's first team on 20 December 2011, playing 70 minutes in a 5–1 home win against SD Ponferradina in the round of 32 of the Copa del Rey (7–1 on aggregate). He scored his first professional goal on 8 October 2012, Castilla's second in the 4–2 victory at Hércules CF.

On 4 July 2014, Casado agreed to a two-year deal with Real Betis, recently relegated to division two. He terminated his contract on 15 July of the following year, and moved to Ponferradina of the same league five days later.

On 8 July 2016, Casado signed for Real Zaragoza also of the second tier. On 6 July of the following year, he moved abroad for the first time in his career after agreeing to a contract with Super League Greece club Xanthi FC. He made his debut for the latter in the season opener, a 0–0 home draw against PAS Lamia 1964. His first goal in the competition came on 29 April 2018, when he helped the hosts defeat Athlitiki Enosi Larissa F.C. 1–0.

Casado left the Xanthi FC Arena at the end of 2018–19, but returned on 1 January 2020 on a new deal. He returned to Spain on 16 August 2020, with the 31-year-old joining CF Rayo Majadahonda in the Segunda División B.
