= Antonio Martínez (footballer, born 1990) =

Spanish footballer

Personal information
- Full name: Antonio Martínez Felipe
- Date of birth: 7 March 1990 (age 36)
- Place of birth: Madrid, Spain
- Height: 1.72 m (5 ft 7 1/2 in)
- Position: Midfielder

Youth career
- 1998–2000: UD La Poveda
- 2000–2001: EF Arganda
- 2001–2002: Rayo Vallecano
- 2002–2010: Real Madrid

Senior career*
Years	Team	Apps	(Gls)
2009–2010	Real Madrid C	29	(1)
2010–2013	Real Madrid B	12	(1)
2012	→ Mirandés (loan)	8	(0)
2013	→ Mirandés (loan)	10	(0)
2013–2016	Alcorcón	57	(3)
2016	→ Numancia (loan)	8	(0)
2016–2020	Cultural Leonesa	68	(3)
2021	Al-Salmiya	2	(2)
Total		194	(10)
- * Club domestic league appearances and goals

Antonio Martínez Felipe (born 7 March 1990) is a Spanish former professional footballer who played as a midfielder.

He made 93 appearances in the Segunda División in five seasons, scoring three goals for Alcorcón and one for Cultural Leonesa.

== Club career ==
=== Real Madrid and Mirandés ===
Born in Madrid, Martínez joined Real Madrid's youth system in 2002, aged 12. In 2009–10, he made his senior debut with the C team, being promoted to the reserves the following season but featuring in only eight matches.

In the 2011–12 campaign, Martínez once again received very few opportunities, being loaned to fellow Segunda División B club CD Mirandés in January 2012. In July, as both sides achieved promotion, he returned to Castilla.

In January 2013, having failed to appear for Real B in the Segunda División, Martínez returned to Mirandés also on loan. He played his first game in that league on 23 February, featuring the full 90 minutes in a 2–0 away loss against Racing de Santander.

=== Alcorcón ===
Martínez signed a one-year contract with fellow second-tier AD Alcorcón on 30 August 2013. He scored his first professional goal on 10 September, the second in the 4–1 away win over RCD Mallorca in the second round of the Copa del Rey.

On 2 July 2014, Martínez agreed to a new three-year deal with the Madrid side. He scored a brace on 25 January 2015, but in a 3–2 defeat at Albacete Balompié.

=== Later career ===
On 1 July 2016, after a six-month loan spell at CD Numancia, Martínez cut ties with Alcorcón and joined Cultural y Deportiva Leonesa. In November 2022, following his retirement, the 32-year-old returned to the latter as assistant to the technical secretary.

== Career statistics ==
As of 7 June 2015

Club	Division	Season	League		National Cup		Continental		Other		Total	
Club	Division	Season	Apps	Goals	Apps	Goals	Apps	Goals	Apps	Goals	Apps	Goals
Real Madrid B	Segunda División B	2010–11	8	1	—		—		—		8	1
Real Madrid B	Segunda División B	2011–12	4	0	—		—		—		4	0
Real Madrid B	Total		12	1	—		—		—		12	1
Mirandés	Segunda División B	2011–12	11	0	0	0	—		—		11	0
Mirandés	Segunda División	2012–13	10	0	0	0	—		—		10	0
Mirandés	Total		21	0	0	0	—		—		21	0
Alcorcón	Segunda División	2013–14	26	1	5	1	—		—		31	2
Alcorcón	Segunda División	2014–15	31	2	0	0	—		—		31	2
Alcorcón	Total		57	3	5	1	—		—		62	4
Career totals			90	4	5	1	—		—		95	5

== Honours ==
Real Madrid B

- Segunda División B: 2011–12

Cultural Leonesa

- Segunda División B: 2016–17
