= Pedro Mosquera =

Spanish footballer (born 1988)

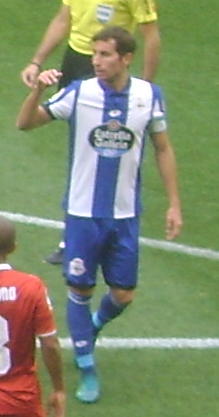
- Mosquera with Deportivo in 2016

Personal information
- Full name: Pedro Mosquera Parada
- Date of birth: 21 April 1988 (age 38)
- Place of birth: A Coruña, Spain
- Height: 1.84 m (6 ft 0 in)
- Position: Defensive midfielder

Youth career
- 1994–1997: Santa María del Mar
- 1997–1999: Galicia Gaiteira
- 1999–2000: Deportivo La Coruña
- 2000–2006: Real Madrid

Senior career*
Years	Team	Apps	(Gls)
2006–2007	Real Madrid C		
2006–2010	Real Madrid B	98	(6)
2010	Real Madrid	1	(0)
2010–2014	Getafe	39	(0)
2011–2013	→ Real Madrid B (loan)	54	(4)
2014–2015	Elche	25	(1)
2015–2019	Deportivo La Coruña	99	(3)
2019–2022	Huesca	99	(0)
2022–2024	Alcorcón	67	(2)
2024–2025	Rayo Majadahonda	13	(0)
Total		495	(16)

International career
2004	Spain U16	1	(0)
2004–2005	Spain U17	4	(0)
2006–2007	Spain U19	6	(0)
- * Club domestic league appearances and goals

Pedro Mosquera Parada (born 21 April 1988) is a Spanish former professional footballer who played mainly as a defensive midfielder.

== Club career ==
Born in A Coruña, Galicia, Mosquera played roller hockey for his high school team in neighbouring Santa María del Mar. In 2000, at the age of 12, he arrived in Real Madrid's youth system. He started out as a professional in 2006–07's Segunda División – four games, 84 minutes and relegation.

On 24 January 2010, Mosquera was called to the first team for a match against Málaga, but did not leave the bench. He made his La Liga debut two months and one day later, playing one minute in a 4–2 away win over Getafe after replacing Xabi Alonso.

Mosquera signed precisely with Getafe on 12 July 2010, penning a five-year contract and reuniting with former Real Madrid Castilla coach Míchel. He made his debut for the club 16 days later, scoring against Germany's VfL Osnabrück in a friendly.

On 20 January 2012, after not playing one single minute under new manager Luis García in the season, Mosquera agreed to return to Castilla, with the side in the Segunda División B. In summer 2014, after a further top-flight campaign with Getafe, he joined Elche of the same league on a three-year contract. He scored his first goal in the Spanish top tier on 14 September while at the service of the latter, contributing to a 3–2 away victory over Rayo Vallecano.

Mosquera cut ties with the Valencians on 27 July 2015, and signed a four-year deal with Deportivo de La Coruña hours later. He played 37 matches in his first season, helping to a final 15th position in the table.

On 2 August 2019, Mosquera terminated his contract at the Estadio Riazor and joined Huesca for two years the following day. During his spell in Aragon, he totalled 100 appearances.

On 8 July 2022, Mosquera moved to Primera Federación club Alcorcón. Two years later, the 36-year-old joined Rayo Majadahonda of Segunda Federación.

== Career statistics ==
As of 27 July 2022

Appearances and goals by club, season and competition
Club	Season	League			Cup		Continental		Other		Total	
Club	Season	Division	Apps	Goals	Apps	Goals	Apps	Goals	Apps	Goals	Apps	Goals
Real Madrid B	2006–07	Segunda División	4	0	—		—		—		4	0
Real Madrid B	2007–08	Segunda División B	27	1	—		—		—		27	1
Real Madrid B	2008–09	Segunda División B	33	1	—		—		—		33	1
Real Madrid B	2009–10	Segunda División B	34	4	—		—		—		34	4
Real Madrid B	Total		98	6	0	0	0	0	0	0	98	6
Real Madrid	2009–10	La Liga	1	0	0	0	0	0	—		1	0
Getafe	2010–11	La Liga	14	0	3	0	4	0	—		21	0
Getafe	2011–12	La Liga	0	0	0	0	0	0	—		0	0
Getafe	Total		14	0	3	0	4	0	0	0	21	0
Real Madrid B (loan)	2011–12	Segunda División B	16	1	—		—		4 (Note: Appearances in Segunda División B play-offs)	2	20	3
Real Madrid B (loan)	2012–13	Segunda División	38	3	—		—		—		38	3
Real Madrid B (loan)	Total		54	4	0	0	0	0	4	2	58	6
Getafe	2013–14	La Liga	25	0	1	0	—		—		26	0
Elche	2014–15	La Liga	25	1	2	0	—		—		27	1
Deportivo	2015–16	La Liga	37	0	3	0	—		—		40	0
Deportivo	2016–17	La Liga	23	3	4	0	—		—		27	3
Deportivo	2017–18	La Liga	23	0	2	0	—		—		25	0
Deportivo	2018–19	Segunda División	16	0	1	0	—		—		17	0
Deportivo	Total		99	3	10	0	0	0	0	0	109	3
Huesca	2019–20	Segunda División	39	0	1	0	—		—		40	0
Huesca	2020–21	La Liga	27	0	0	0	—		—		27	0
Huesca	2021–22	Segunda División	33	0	0	0	—		—		33	0
Huesca	Total		99	0	1	0	0	0	0	0	100	0
Alcorcón	2022–23	Primera Federación	0	0	0	0	—		—		0	0
Career total			355	14	17	0	4	0	4	2	380	15

== Honours ==
Real Madrid Castilla

- Segunda División B: 2011–12

Huesca

- Segunda División: 2019–20
