= José Antonio Ríos =

Spanish footballer

Personal information
- Full name: José Antonio Ríos Reina
- Date of birth: 10 May 1990 (age 36)
- Place of birth: Seville, Spain
- Height: 1.82 m (5 ft 11 1/2 in)
- Position: Left back

Youth career
- 2000–2001: Castilblanco
- 2001–2008: Sevilla

Senior career*
Years	Team	Apps	(Gls)
2008–2011	Sevilla B	43	(2)
2011–2013	Real Madrid B	10	(1)
2013–2014	Mirandés	31	(0)
2014–2016	Llagostera	56	(2)
2016–2017	Anorthosis	11	(0)
2017–2022	Ponferradina	155	(6)
2022–2024	Eibar	40	(0)
2024–2025	Cartagena	17	(0)

International career
2008	Spain U19	3	(0)
- * Club domestic league appearances and goals as of 2 February 2025

José Antonio Ríos Reina (born 10 May 1990) is a Spanish footballer who plays as a left back.
