= Real Madrid C =

- Full name: Real Madrid Club de Fútbol C
- Nickname: RMC
- Founded: 1952 (as Real Madrid CF Aficionados) I 1973 (as CD San Ignacio de Loyola) II
- Ground: Ciudad Real Madrid, Madrid, Spain
- Capacity: 3,000
- President: Florentino Pérez
- Head coach: Marc Carrasco
- League: Segunda Federación – Group 5
- 2025–26: Segunda Federación – Group 5, 13th of 18
Home colours	Away colours

Real Madrid Club de Fútbol C, commonly known as Real Madrid C, is a Spanish association football team, and is Real Madrid's second reserve team. They play in Segunda Federación – Group 5, holding their home games at La Ciudad del Real Madrid in Valdebebas outside the city of Madrid.

At the end of the 2014–15 Tercera División, Real Madrid C was disbanded. However, in 2023, the team was brought back and was put in the Tercera Federación after taking the place of RSC Internacional.

== History ==
=== Real Madrid Aficionados ===
Real Madrid Aficionados was the amateur team for Real Madrid. In the 1960s, the team won eight Campeonato de Aficionados (national amateur cup) in an 11-year period, including six in succession. The last of their amateur championships qualified the team for the 1970–71 Copa del Generalísimo; they lost in the second round which was one further than their 'big brothers' at Plus Ultra achieved. The Aficionados' last Spanish Cup appearance was in the 1986–87 edition of the Copa del Rey. While Castilla lost in the first round, the amateurs lasted until the round of 16 where they were defeated 1–4 on aggregate by a senior Atlético Madrid side.

In league play, the Aficionados won promotion from the Preferente Castellana to the Tercera División in 1981. Their best year was the 1984–85 season, winning their Tercera group but renouncing their play-off spot in the Promoción de Ascenso.

=== Real Madrid C ===
After RFEF rulings about the status of reserve teams, the amateur team was renamed Real Madrid C in 1990. In 1990–91, the team again won their group, but was runner-up in the Liguilla de Ascenso (promotion mini-league). Two years later, the team won promotion to the Segunda División B. In 1997, the team was relegated back to the Tercera when Real Madrid B were demoted from the Segunda División to the Segunda División B. In 2005–06, the team missed promotion to the Segunda B by a single goal; Guijuelo won their home leg 1–0 and lost away 1–2 for 2–2 on aggregate, and the tie was broken by the away goals rule.

Real Madrid C gained promotion in 2012, and maintained an upper-table position in the third tier for two years before being forcibly demoted in 2014 when Castilla were relegated to the third level. After the 2014–15 Tercera División season, the C-team was disbanded.

In 2022, Real Madrid reached an agreement with RSC Internacional FC to make the club their C-team for the 2022–23 Tercera Federación. For the 2023–24 season, Real Madrid C returned to an active status and took RSC Internacional's place in the division.

== Honours ==
- Tercera División Champions

Winners (5): 1984–85, 1990–91, 1991–92, 1998–99, 2005–06

- Tercera Federación

Winners (1): 2023–24

- Copa de la Liga

Winners (1): 1982–83 (Copa de la Liga de Tercera División)

- Copa Federación Centro
  - Winners (1): 1947–48
- Campeonato de España de Aficionados

Winners (8): 1959–60, 1961–62, 1962–63, 1963–64, 1964–65, 1965–66, 1966–67, 1969–70

- Copa de Comunidad

Winners (2): 2002–03 (Qualified for the Copa Federación where it was eliminated by Real Ávila in the preliminary round 0–2; 2–3), 2007–08 (Qualified for the Copa Federación; eliminated by SS Reyes in the second round 1–0; 0–2)

== Season to season ==
=== Real Madrid Aficionados ===
Season	Tier	Division	Place	Copa del Rey
1970–71	—	—	—	Second round
1973–74	4	Reg. Pref.	6th	
1974–75	4	Reg. Pref.	8th	
1975–76	4	Reg. Pref.	13th	
1976–77	4	Reg. Pref.	9th	
1977–78	5	Reg. Pref.	3rd	
1978–79	5	Reg. Pref.	4th	
1979–80	5	Reg. Pref.	8th	
1980–81	5	Reg. Pref.	2nd	

Season	Tier	Division	Place	Copa del Rey
1981–82	4	3ª	7th	
1982–83	4	3ª	7th	
1983–84	4	3ª	2nd	First round
1984–85	4	3ª	1st	First round
1985–86	4	3ª	4th	First round
1986–87	4	3ª	8th	Round of 16
1987–88	4	3ª	10th	
1988–89	4	3ª	4th	
1989–90	4	3ª	5th	

=== Real Madrid C ===
Season	Tier	Division	Place
1990–91	4	3ª	1st
1991–92	4	3ª	1st
1992–93	4	3ª	2nd
1993–94	3	2ª B	7th
1994–95	3	2ª B	13th
1995–96	3	2ª B	9th
1996–97	3	2ª B	13th
1997–98	4	3ª	3rd
1998–99	4	3ª	1st
1999–00	4	3ª	2nd
2000–01	4	3ª	4th
2001–02	4	3ª	11th
2002–03	4	3ª	6th
2003–04	4	3ª	14th
2004–05	4	3ª	11th
2005–06	4	3ª	1st
2006–07	4	3ª	6th
2007–08	4	3ª	9th
2008–09	4	3ª	8th
2009–10	4	3ª	6th

Season	Tier	Division	Place
2010–11	4	3ª	5th
2011–12	4	3ª	2nd
2012–13	3	2ª B	5th
2013–14	3	2ª B	9th
2014–15	4	3ª	9th
2015–2023	DNP		
2023–24	5	3ª Fed.	1st
2024–25	4	2ª Fed.	13th
2025–26	4	2ª Fed.	13th
2026–27	4	2ª Fed.	

- 6 seasons in Segunda División B
- 3 seasons in Segunda Federación
- 28 seasons in Tercera División
- 1 seasons in Tercera Federación
- 8 seasons in Primera Regional Preferente

== Players ==
As of 2 September 2026

Note: Flags indicate national team as defined under FIFA eligibility rules; some limited exceptions apply. Players may hold more than one non-FIFA nationality.

No.	Pos.	Nation	Player
1	GK	ESP	Álvaro González
2	DF	ESP	Melvin Ukpeigbe
3	DF	ESP	Alfredo Sotres
4	DF	ESP	Álex Pérez
5	MF	ESP	Ignacio Gascón
6	MF	ESP	Beto
7	FW	ESP	Álvaro Ginés
8	MF	ESP	Manex Rezola
9	FW	ESP	Jaime Barroso
10	FW	ESP	Gabri Castrelo
11	DF	ESP	Liberto Navascués
12	DF	ESP	Pablo Bellosillo
13	GK	UKR	Illia Voloshyn

No.	Pos.	Nation	Player
14	MF	ESP	Carlos Díez
15	DF	ESP	Aimar García
16	MF	CIV	Kalifa Camara
17	DF	ESP	Paulo de Almeida
18	MF	ESP	Iker Doblas
19	FW	ESP	José Reyes
20	MF	ESP	Gabri Valero
21	DF	ESP	Ariel Nkoghe
22	MF	ESP	Pol Durán
23	MF	ESP	Marcos Viega
24	FW	MAR	Rayan Zinebi (on loan from Granada)
25	MF	ESP	Jorge Rajado

=== From Youth Academy ===
Note: Flags indicate national team as defined under FIFA eligibility rules; some limited exceptions apply. Players may hold more than one non-FIFA nationality.

No.	Pos.	Nation	Player
27	DF	ESP	Álvaro Lezcano
29	FW	ESP	Yeremaiah Ramos
30	MF	ESP	Diego Lacosta
31	GK	ESP	Guille Ponce
32	DF	ESP	Javi Bailón

No.	Pos.	Nation	Player
33	DF	ESP	José Luis Espinosa
34	DF	ESP	Mateo Garrido
35	DF	ESP	Guille González
36	FW	ESP	Fran Santamaría
38	FW	ESP	Enzo Alves

Out on loan

Note: Flags indicate national team as defined under FIFA eligibility rules; some limited exceptions apply. Players may hold more than one non-FIFA nationality.

No.	Pos.	Nation	Player
—	GK	ESP	Aarón Gómez (at Poblense until 30 June 2027)
—	DF	ESP	Javier Mena (at Toledo until 30 June 2027)

No.	Pos.	Nation	Player
—	DF	ESP	Óscar Mesa (at Rayo Majadahonda until 30 June 2027)
—	MF	ESP	Aimar Santiago (at Coria until 30 June 2027)

=== Current technical staff ===
Position	Staff
Head coach	(Spain) Marc Carrasco
Assistant coach	(Spain) Jesús Bargueiras
Goalkeeper coach	(Spain) Mario Soria
Fitness coach	(Spain) Alberto Berrocal

- Last updated: 13 July 2026
- Source: Real Madrid CF

== Notable players ==
- (Spain) GK **Santiago Cañizares** 1988–89
- (Spain) GK Raúl Valbuena 1994–95
- (Spain) GK José Manuel Roca 1995–97
- (Spain) GK Oliver 1996–97
- (Spain) GK **Iker Casillas** 1998–99
- (Spain) GK **Carlos Sánchez** 1999–2000
- (Spain) GK Manu Herrera 2000–01
- (Spain) GK **Diego López** 2000–03
- (Spain) GK David Sierra 2002–04
- (Spain) GK David Cobeño 2003–05
- (Spain) GK **Kiko Casilla** 2004–06
- (Spain) GK **Antonio Adán** 2004–06
- (Spain) GK **Tomás Mejías** 2007–10
- (Spain) GK **Fernando Pacheco** 2011–13
- (Spain) GK Rubén Yáñez 2012–13
- (Spain) GK **Ander Cantero** 2015
- (Spain) DF Rafael Benítez 1978–79
- (Spain) DF David Belenguer 1992–93
- (Spain) DF **Alberto Marcos** 1993
- (Spain) DF Felipe Vaqueriza 1994–95
- (Spain) DF **José García Calvo** 1994–95
- (Spain) DF **Roberto Rojas** 1994–95
- (Spain) DF Vicente Valcarce 1995–96
- (Spain) DF **Manuel Tena** 1997–98
- (Spain) DF Rubén Pulido 1998–2000
- (Spain) DF **Francisco Pavón** 1998–2000
- (Spain) DF **Óscar Miñambres** 1999–2000
- (Spain) DF **Raúl Bravo** 2000–01
- (Spain) DF **Álvaro Mejía** 2001–02
- (Spain) DF **Álvaro Arbeloa** 2002–03
- (Spain) DF Javi Barral 2002–03
- (Spain) DF Juan Duque 2002–03
- (Spain) DF Javi Soria 2003–06
- (Spain) DF **Miguel Torres** 2005–06
- (Spain) DF Laure 2005–06
- (Spain) DF Jordi 2005–08
- (Spain) DF **David Mateos** 2006–07
- (Spain) DF Javier Velayos 2006–07
- (Poland) DF Krzysztof Król 2007
- (Poland) DF Kamil Glik 2007–08
- (Dominican Republic) DF Tano 2010–11
- (Spain) DF Carlos Expósito 2010–11
- (Spain) DF Derik Osede 2011–13
- (Spain) DF Javi Noblejas 2011–13
- (Spain) DF **Diego Llorente** 2012–13
- (Spain) DF Ángel 2012–14
- (Liberia) DF Joel Johnson 2012–14
- (Spain) DF José León 2013–15
- (Spain) DF Mario Hermoso 2014–15
- (Austria) DF **Philipp Lienhart** 2014–15
- (Spain) DF **Álvaro Tejero** 2015
- (Dominican Republic) DF **Luismi Quezada** 2015–16
- (Spain) MF **Antonio Gómez** 1993–94
- (Spain) MF **Jaime** 1993–94
- (Spain) MF **Álvaro Benito** 1994–95
- (Spain) MF **Guti** 1994–95
- (Spain) MF Fernando Morán 1994–95
- (Spain) MF **Víctor Sánchez** 1994–95
- (Spain) FW **Alberto Rivera** 1995–96
- (Spain) MF Javier Artero 1995–97
- (Spain) MF **Fernando** 1997–99
- (Spain) MF Andrés Santos 1998–99
- (Spain) MF David Sousa 1998–99
- (Venezuela) MF Julio Álvarez 1999–2000
- (Spain) MF Corona 1999–2000
- (Spain) MF José Luis Capdevila 2000–01
- (Spain) MF José Cabrera 2001–02
- (Spain) MF Álex Pérez 2002–03
- (Spain) MF Manuel Tello 2003–04
- (Spain) MF **Marcos Tébar** 2003–05
- (Spain) MF **Borja Valero** 2004–05
- (Spain) MF **Esteban Granero** 2004–06
- (Spain) MF Rodri 2005–06
- (Spain) MF Ferrán 2005–06
- (Spain) MF Juanmi Callejón 2005–07
- (Spain) MF **Pedro Mosquera** 2006–07
- (Ecuador) MF Fernando Guerrero 2007–09
- (Spain) MF Antonio Martínez 2009–10
- (Spain) MF Óscar Plano 2010–11
- (Spain) MF Jordi Martín 2010–12
- (Spain) MF Enrique Castaño 2011–12
- (Spain) MF Sergio Aguza 2011–13
- (Spain) MF Dani Ramírez 2011–14
- (Spain) MF **Omar Mascarell** 2012–13
- (Spain) MF **Álvaro Medrán** 2012–14
- (Spain) MF Gonzalo Melero 2013–14
- (Spain) MF **Javier Muñoz** 2014
- (France) MF **Enzo Fernández** 2014–15
- (Spain) MF Aleix Febas 2014–15
- (Spain) FW Víctor 1993
- (Spain) FW **Raúl** 1994
- (Spain) FW **Irurzun** 1994–96
- (Spain) FW Javi Guerrero 1995–96
- (Spain) FW Mista 1996–97
- (Spain) FW Carlos Aranda 1998–2000
- (Spain) FW **David Aganzo** 1999–2000
- (Spain) FW Luis García 2000–01
- (Spain) FW Riki 2000–02
- (Spain) FW David Barral 2002–03
- (Spain) FW Álex Colorado 2004–05
- (Equatorial Guinea) FW **Javier Balboa** 2004–05
- (Jordan) FW Tha'er Bawab 2004–06
- (Spain) FW Rayco 2005–06
- (Spain) FW **José Callejón** 2006–07
- (Spain) FW Jesús Berrocal 2007–09
- (Spain) FW **Juankar** 2008–09
- (Spain) FW Samuel Sáiz 2008–11
- (Spain) FW Rodrigo 2009
- (Spain) FW **Lucas Vázquez** 2010–11
- (Spain) FW Fran Sol 2010–14
- (Equatorial Guinea) FW Rubén Belima 2011–13
- (Spain) FW Rubén Sobrino 2011–13
- (Spain) FW Burgui 2012–13
- (Spain) FW **Raúl de Tomás** 2012–13
- (Dominican Republic) FW **Mariano Díaz** 2012–14
- (Colombia) FW Juanjo Narváez 2013–15
- (Spain) FW Álvaro Jiménez 2013–15
- (Spain) FW Sergio Sánchez 2014–15

- N.B. Players in **BOLD** played for the senior team; players in ITALICS have not played in the Primera División.

== Coaches ==
- (Spain) Toni Grande (1989–1996)
- (Spain) Juan Martín Delgado (1996–1997)
- (Spain) Miguel Ángel Portugal (1997)
- (Spain) Paco Hernández (1997–1999)
- (Spain) Paco Buyo (1999–2000)
- (Spain) José Aurelio Gay (2000–2002)
- (Spain) José Manuel Díaz (2002–2003)
- (Spain) Paco Buyo (2003–2004)
- (Spain) Abraham García (2004–2007)
- (Spain) José María Salmerón (2007–2008)
- (Spain) Antonio Díaz Carlavilla (2008–2009)
- (Spain) Alberto Toril (2009)
- (Spain) Manolo Díaz (2009–2013)
- (Spain) José Aurelio Gay (2013–2015)
- (Spain) Pau Quesada (2023–2024)
- (Spain) Álvaro Gómez-Rey (2024)
- (Spain) Joselu Sánchez (2025–2026)
- (Spain) Víctor Cea (2026–present)
