= Juanfran (footballer, born 1988) =

Spanish footballer

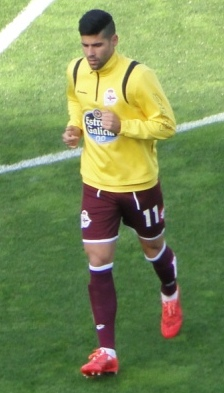
- Juanfran with Deportivo La Coruña in 2015

Personal information
- Full name: Juan Francisco Moreno Fuertes
- Date of birth: 11 September 1988 (age 38)
- Place of birth: Madrid, Spain
- Height: 1.80 m (5 ft 11 in)
- Positions: Right-back; winger

Youth career
- 1996–2005: Avance
- 2005–2007: Getafe

Senior career*
Years	Team	Apps	(Gls)
2007–2008	Getafe B	57	(6)
2008–2009	Getafe	1	(0)
2008–2009	→ Villarreal B (loan)	13	(2)
2009–2013	Real Madrid B	132	(16)
2010	Real Madrid	1	(0)
2013–2015	Betis	34	(1)
2014–2015	→ Deportivo La Coruña (loan)	34	(1)
2015–2017	Watford	0	(0)
2015–2017	→ Deportivo La Coruña (loan)	69	(1)
2017–2019	Deportivo La Coruña	35	(0)
2018–2019	→ Leganés (loan)	23	(1)
2019–2022	Alanyaspor	87	(0)
2022	Málaga	16	(0)
2023	Oviedo	2	(0)
Total		504	(28)
- * Club domestic league appearances and goals

Juan Francisco Moreno Fuertes (born 11 September 1988), known as Juanfran, is a Spanish former professional footballer who played mainly as a right-back but also as a right winger.

He made 197 appearances in La Liga, chiefly for Deportivo de La Coruña but also with Getafe, Real Madrid, Betis and Leganés. He also played in Turkey.

== Club career ==
=== Getafe ===
Born in Madrid, Juanfran joined local Getafe CF's youth ranks aged 17, making his senior debut in 2007 with the reserves in the Tercera División. On 12 March 2008, after taking part in two Copa del Rey games against lowly Burgos CF for his competitive debut, he came on as a substitute for Jaime Gavilán in the last minutes of a 1–0 home win over S.L. Benfica in the round of 16 of the UEFA Cup (3–1 aggregate win). His first La Liga appearance came 11 days later, also from the bench, in a 1–0 loss at Athletic Bilbao.

=== Real Madrid ===
After one year with Villarreal CF's reserves in the Segunda División B, which ended in promotion, a first-ever for the team, Juanfran returned to his hometown and signed with Real Madrid. He spent the vast majority of his first seasons with the club with Real Madrid Castilla, also in the third tier.

Juanfran made his debut with the first team on 2 May 2010, replacing Fernando Gago in a home league fixture against CA Osasuna, with five minutes to go: the score was then at 2–2, but the Merengues eventually won 3–2 thanks to a Cristiano Ronaldo goal.

=== Betis ===
In March 2013, Juanfran agreed to join Real Betis on a free transfer on 1 July. He scored his first goal in the Spanish top flight on 11 May of the following year, in a 4–3 home victory over Real Valladolid, but the Andalusians were relegated as last.

=== Deportivo ===
On 1 September 2014, Juanfran moved to Deportivo de La Coruña in a season-long loan deal and also agreed a contract with Watford, with the latter move being made effective in July 2015 for a fee of around £1.5 million.

Juanfran returned to Dépor on 16 July 2015, on loan for one year. The following summer, even though newspaper La Voz de Galicia initially reported an agreement had been reached to a permanent four-year deal after the English club received a compensation, he was again loaned to the Spaniards who now had a buying option.

Juanfran signed permanently for Deportivo in July 2017, and was a regular starter as they suffered relegation. On 12 July 2018, he was loaned to top-division side CD Leganés for one year.

=== Alanyaspor ===
On 29 July 2019, Juanfran rescinded his Deportivo contract with a year remaining by mutual consent to join Alanyaspor of Turkey's Super Lig, signing a two-year deal with the option of a third the same day. He made 97 competitive appearances during his spell.

=== Later career ===
On 23 June 2022, Juanfran joined Málaga CF as a free agent, agreeing to a one-year contract with the option for another one. He terminated his link with the club the following 9 January after being deemed surplus to requirements by manager Pepe Mel, and, later that day, signed for fellow second-tier Real Oviedo.

== Career statistics ==
Appearances and goals by club, season and competition
Club	Season	League			Cup		Europe		Other		Total	
Club	Season	Division	Apps	Goals	Apps	Goals	Apps	Goals	Apps	Goals	Apps	Goals
Getafe	2007–08	La Liga	1	0	2	0	1 (Note: Appearances in UEFA Europa League)	0	—		4	0
Villarreal B	2008–09	Segunda División B	13	2	—		—		6 (Note: Appearances in Segunda División B play-offs)	0	19	2
Real Madrid B	2009–10	Segunda División B	22	5	—		—		—		22	5
Real Madrid B	2010–11	Segunda División B	33	3	—		—		2	0	35	3
Real Madrid B	2011–12	Segunda División B	35	4	—		—		4	0	39	4
Real Madrid B	2012–13	Segunda División	42	4	—		—		—		42	4
Real Madrid B	Total		132	16	0	0	0	0	6	0	138	16
Real Madrid	2009–10	La Liga	1	0	0	0	0	0	—		1	0
Real Madrid	2010–11	La Liga	0	0	1	0	0	0	—		1	0
Real Madrid	Total		1	0	1	0	0	0	0	0	2	0
Betis	2013–14	La Liga	34	1	3	0	11	0	—		48	1
Deportivo La Coruña (loan)	2014–15	La Liga	34	1	0	0	—		—		34	1
Deportivo La Coruña (loan)	2015–16	La Liga	35	1	0	0	—		—		35	1
Deportivo La Coruña (loan)	2016–17	La Liga	34	0	4	0	—		—		38	0
Deportivo La Coruña (loan)	Total		69	1	4	0	0	0	0	0	73	1
Deportivo La Coruña	2017–18	La Liga	35	0	1	0	—		—		36	0
Leganés (loan)	2018–19	La Liga	23	0	3	0	—		—		26	0
Alanyaspor	2019–20	Süper Lig	13	0	2	0	—		—		15	0
Alanyaspor	2020–21	Süper Lig	37	0	2	0	1	0	—		40	0
Alanyaspor	2021–22	Süper Lig	37	0	5	0	—		—		42	0
Alanyaspor	Total		87	0	9	0	1	0	0	0	97	0
Málaga	2022–23	Segunda División	16	0	0	0	—		—		16	0
Oviedo	2022–23	Segunda División	2	0	0	0	—		—		2	0
Career total			447	21	23	0	13	0	12	0	495	21

== Honours ==
Real Madrid

- Copa del Rey: 2010–11

Real Madrid Castilla

- Segunda División B: 2011–12
