= 2005–06 Real Madrid CF season =

105th season in existence of Real Madrid CF

Real Madrid
2005–06 season
- President: Florentino Pérez (until 27 February 2006); Fernando Martín Alvarez (until 26 April 2006); Luis Gomez Montejano
- Head coach: Vanderlei Luxemburgo (until 5 December 2005); Juan Ramón López Caro
- Stadium: Santiago Bernabéu
- La Liga: 2nd
- Copa del Rey: Semi-finals
- UEFA Champions League: Round of 16
- Top goalscorer: League: Ronaldo (14); All: Ronaldo (15)
Home colours	Away colours	Third colours

The 2005–06 season was Real Madrid CF's 75th season in La Liga. This article lists all matches that the club played in the 2005–06 season, and also shows statistics of the club's players.

For the second consecutive season, Real Madrid did not win any competitions. This was their first consecutive trophyless seasons since 1982–83 to 1983–84.

== Players ==
Note: Flags indicate national team as defined under FIFA eligibility rules; some limited exceptions apply. Players may hold more than one non-FIFA nationality.

No.	Pos.	Nation	Player
1	GK	ESP	Iker Casillas
2	DF	ESP	Míchel Salgado
3	DF	BRA	Roberto Carlos
4	DF	ESP	Sergio Ramos
5	MF	FRA	Zinedine Zidane
6	DF	ESP	Iván Helguera
7	FW	ESP	Raúl (Captain)
8	FW	BRA	Júlio Baptista
9	FW	BRA	Ronaldo
10	FW	BRA	Robinho
11	DF	BRA	Cicinho
12	MF	URU	Pablo García

No.	Pos.	Nation	Player
13	GK	ESP	Diego López
14	MF	ESP	Guti
15	DF	ESP	Raúl Bravo
16	MF	DEN	Thomas Gravesen
17	FW	ESP	Roberto Soldado
18	DF	ENG	Jonathan Woodgate
19	FW	ITA	Antonio Cassano
20	DF	ESP	Óscar Miñambres
21	DF	URU	Carlos Diogo
22	DF	ESP	Francisco Pavón
23	MF	ENG	David Beckham
24	DF	ESP	Álvaro Mejía

=== Transfers ===
==== In ====
No.	Pos.	Nat.	Name	Age	EU	Moving from	Type	Transfer window	Ends	Transfer fee	Source
4	DF	(Spain)	S. Ramos	19	EU	Sevilla	Transfer	Summer	2009	€27M	
10	FW	(Brazil)	Robinho	21	Non-EU	Santos (Brazil)	Transfer	Summer	2008	€25M	
8	MF	(Brazil)	Baptista	23	Non-EU	Sevilla	Transfer	Summer	2010	€20M	
11	DF	(Brazil)	Cicinho	25	EU	São Paulo (Brazil)	Transfer	Winter	2007	€8M	
21	DF	(Uruguay)	Diogo	21	Non-EU	River Plate (Argentina)	Transfer	Summer	2007	€6M	
19	FW	(Italy)	Cassano	22	EU	Roma (Italy)	Transfer	Winter	2008	€5.5M	
12	MF	(Uruguay)	P. García	28	EU	Osasuna	Transfer	Summer	2008	€4.5M	

Total spending: ▼€96 million

=== On loan ===
Note: Flags indicate national team as defined under FIFA eligibility rules; some limited exceptions apply. Players may hold more than one non-FIFA nationality.

No.	Pos.	Nation	Player
19	FW	ESP	Javier Portillo (to Club Brugge)
25	GK	ESP	Carlos Sánchez (to Almería)

==== Out ====
No.	Pos.	Nat.	Name	Age	EU	Moving to	Type	Transfer window	Transfer fee	Source
19	CB	(Argentina)	Walter Samuel	27	Non-EU	Internazionale (Italy)	Transfer	Summer	€16M	[ ]
21	LW	(Argentina)	Santiago Solari	28	EU	Internazionale (Italy)	Transfer	Summer	€3M	[ ]
10	RW	(Portugal)	Luís Figo	32	EU	Internazionale (Italy)	Contract cancellation	Summer	Free	[ ]
11	FW	(England)	Michael Owen	25	EU	Newcastle United (England)	Transfer	Summer	€16M	[ ]

Last updated: 2010-07-01
Total income: ▲€35 million

== Competitions ==
=== Pre-season ===
In June 2005, president Florentino Pérez presented the "2005 Real Madrid World Tour", which included 6 friendly matches in North America and Asia. Two more matches were played in Central Europe during the second stage of the pre-season, including a homage to Ferenc Puskás, which was held in Hungary. The last match, an annual Trofeo Santiago Bernabéu, was played on home soil.

16 July 2005 1	C.D. Guadalajara	1–3	Real Madrid	Chicago, United States
	Palencia 72'	Report	Mejía 77'; Guti 87'; Soldado 90+3'	Stadium: Soldier Field; Referee: Michael Kennedy

18 July 2005 2	LA Galaxy	0–2	Real Madrid	Los Angeles, United States
		Report	Owen 6'; Soldado 75'	Stadium: Home Depot Center; Attendance: 27,000

23 July 2005 3	Beijing Guoan	2–3	Real Madrid	Beijing, China
	Lu Jiang 30'; Jelić 73'	Report	Raúl 37'; Guti; Figo (pen.)	Stadium: Workers' Stadium; Attendance: 40,000

25 July 2005 4	Tokyo Verdy 1969	3–0	Real Madrid	Tokyo, Japan
	Kobayashi 6'; Washington 26'; Yamada 53'	Report		Stadium: Ajinomoto Stadium; Attendance: 30,000; Referee: Masayoshi Okada

27 July 2005 5	Júbilo Iwata	1–3	Real Madrid	Tokyo, Japan
19:00 (JST)	Maeda 23'	Report	Raúl 3'; Ronaldo 28' (pen.), 90' (yellow card) 88'	Stadium: Ajinomoto Stadium

29 July 2005 6	Thailand All-Stars	0–3	Real Madrid	Bangkok, Thailand
		Report	Zidane 7' (pen.); Ronaldo 22' de la Red 87'	Stadium: Rajamangala Stadium; Attendance: 56,000

7 August 2005 7	SK Schwadorf	1–4	Real Madrid	Irdning, Austria
18:00	Grujić 84'	Report	Raúl 36'; Ronaldo 38'; Portillo 67'; Owen 90'	Stadium: Unsere Sportanlage; Attendance: 3,000

14 August 2005 8	Puskás Team XI	1–3	Real Madrid	Budapest, Hungary
20:00	Kenesei 43' (pen.)	Report	Zidane 19' (pen.); Ronaldo 72'; Owen 84'	Stadium: Ferenc Puskás Stadium; Referee: Markus Merk (Germany)

23 August 2005 Trofeo Santiago Bernabéu	Real Madrid	5–0	MLS All-Stars	Madrid, Spain
	Beckham 22'; Ronaldo 39', 73'; Guti 75'; Raúl 90'	Report		Stadium: Santiago Bernabéu; Attendance: 60,000; Referee: Eduardo Iturralde González

=== La Liga ===
==== League table ====
Pos	Team	Pld	W	D	L	GF	GA	GD	Pts	Qualification or relegation
1	Barcelona (C)	38	25	7	6	80	35	+45	82	Qualification for the Champions League group stage
2	Real Madrid	38	20	10	8	70	40	+30	70	Qualification for the Champions League group stage
3	Valencia	38	19	12	7	58	33	+25	69	Qualification for the Champions League third qualifying round
4	Osasuna	38	21	5	12	49	43	+6	68	Qualification for the Champions League third qualifying round
5	Sevilla	38	20	8	10	54	39	+15	68	Qualification for the UEFA Cup first round

Source: LFP
Rules for classification: 1st points; 2nd head-to-head points; 3rd head-to-head goal difference; 4th head-to-head goals scored; 5th goal difference; 6th number of goals scored; 7th Fair-play points
(C) Champions

==== Results by round ====
Round	1	2	3	4	5	6	7	8	9	10	11	12	13	14	15	16	17	18	19	20	21	22	23	24	25	26	27	28	29	30	31	32	33	34	35	36	37	38
Ground	A	H	A	H	A	H	A	H	A	H	A	H	A	H	A	H	H	A	H	H	A	H	A	H	A	H	A	H	A	H	A	H	A	H	A	A	H	A
Result	W	L	L	W	W	W	W	L	W	W	L	L	D	W	W	D	L	D	W	W	W	W	W	W	L	W	D	D	D	W	D	D	D	W	W	W	D	L
Position	5	10	14	9	3	3	1	5	1	1	3	4	7	5	3	6	6	6	4	4	4	4	3	3	3	3	3	2	3	2	2	3	3	3	3	2	2	2

Updated to match(es) played on 2008-07-16. Source: LFP.com
A = Away; H = Home; W = Win; D = Draw; L = Loss; = Leader, 2006-07 UEFA Champions League Group stage; = 2006-07 UEFA Champions League Group stage; = 2006-07 UEFA Champions League Qualifying round; = 2006-07 UEFA Cup; = 2006-07 Segunda Division

=== Matches ===
28 August 2005 1	Cádiz	1–2	Real Madrid
	Pavoni 63'		Ronaldo 4'; Raúl 85'

10 September 2005 2	Real Madrid	2–3	Celta Vigo
	Ronaldo 37' (pen.); Baptista 44'		Contreras 8'; Núñez 45'; Canobbio 77'

18 September 2005 3	Espanyol	1–0	Real Madrid
	Jarque 68'

22 September 2005 4	Real Madrid	3–1	Athletic Bilbao
	Robinho 52'; Raúl 64', 68'		Woodgate 26' (o.g.)

25 September 2005 5	Alavés	0–3	Real Madrid
			Ronaldo 60', 80'; Guti 90+3'

2 October 2005 6	Real Madrid	4–0	Mallorca
	Ronaldo 33'; Roberto Carlos 45', 65'; Baptista 78'

15 October 2005 7	Atlético Madrid	0–3	Real Madrid
			Ronaldo 8' (pen.), 60'; Perea 90+2' (o.g.)

23 October 2005 8	Real Madrid	1–2	Valencia
	Raúl 36'		Baraja 22'; Villa 39' (pen.)

26 October 2005 9	Deportivo	3–1	Real Madrid
	De Guzmán 35'; Juanma 45', 84'		Raúl 86'

29 October 2005 10	Betis	0–2	Real Madrid
			Robinho 30'; Mejía 79'

6 November 2005 11	Real Madrid	1–0	Real Zaragoza
	Roberto Carlos 79' (pen.)

19 November 2005 12	Real Madrid	0–3	Barcelona
			Eto'o 15'; Ronaldinho 59', 75'

27 November 2005 13	Real Sociedad	2–2	Real Madrid
	Prieto 44'; De Paula 58'		Bravo 87'; Zidane 88'

3 December 2005 14	Real Madrid	1–0	Getafe
	Ronaldo 17'

11 December 2005 15	Málaga	0–2	Real Madrid
			Ramos 34'; Robinho 38'

18 December 2005 16	Real Madrid	1–1	Osasuna
	Soldado 84'		Milošević 76'

21 December 2005 17	Real Madrid	1–2	Racing Santander
	Ronaldo 67'		Ayoze 21'; Melo 27'

8 January 2006 18	Villarreal	0–0	Real Madrid

15 January 2006 19	Real Madrid	4–2	Sevilla
	Guti 7'; Zidane 58' (pen.), 60', 90+3'		Luís Fabiano 53'; Ocio 84'

21 January 2006 20	Real Madrid	3–1	Cádiz
	Roberto Carlos 67'; Beckham 71'; Robinho 83'		Medina 54'

29 January 2006 21	Celta Vigo	1–2	Real Madrid
	Lequi 40'		Robinho 17'; Cicinho 57'

4 February 2006 22	Real Madrid	4–0	Espanyol
	Guti 14'; Zidane 43', 51'; Ronaldo 45'

11 February 2006 23	Athletic Bilbao	0–2	Real Madrid
			Robinho 5'; Bravo 90+2'

18 February 2006 24	Real Madrid	3–0	Alavés
	Guti 5'; Robinho 11'; Cicinho 77'

26 February 2006 25	Mallorca	2–1	Real Madrid
	Pisculichi 52' (pen.); Arango 80'		Ramos 31'

5 March 2006 26	Real Madrid	2–1	Atlético Madrid
	Cassano 3'; Baptista 40'		Kežman 27'

12 March 2006 27	Valencia	0–0	Real Madrid

19 March 2006 28	Real Madrid	0–0	Betis

22 March 2006 29	Real Zaragoza	1–1	Real Madrid
	D. Milito 47'		Ronaldo 90+1'

26 March 2006 30	Real Madrid	4–0	Deportivo
	Héctor 9' (o.g.); Ronaldo 37'; Ramos 70'; Baptista 82'

2 April 2006 31	Barcelona	1–1	Real Madrid
	Ronaldinho 21' (pen.)		Ronaldo 36'

9 April 2006 32	Real Madrid	1–1	Real Sociedad
	Ronaldo 25'		González 63'

16 April 2006 33	Getafe	1–1	Real Madrid
	Tena 83'		Baptista 61'

23 April 2006 34	Real Madrid	2–1	Málaga
	Zidane 67' (pen.); Ramos 90'		Bóvio 22'

30 April 2006 35	Osasuna	0–1	Real Madrid
			Baptista 51' (pen.)

4 May 2006 36	Racing Santander	2–3	Real Madrid
	Matabuena 77', 90+2'		Roberto Carlos 33' (pen.); Soldado 61'; Robinho 71'

7 May 2006 37	Real Madrid	3–3	Villarreal
	Baptista 22', 88'; Zidane 66'		Mejía 30' (o.g.); Forlán 38', 85'

16 May 2006 38	Sevilla	4–3	Real Madrid
	Navas 28'; Saviola 30', 34'; Luís Fabiano 44'		Beckham 15', 26'; Zidane 72'

=== Copa del Rey ===
3 January 2006 Round of 16, First Leg	Athletic Bilbao	0–1	Real Madrid	Bilbao
			Beckham 70'	Stadium: San Mamés; Referee: Alberto Undiano Mallenco

11 January 2006 Round of 16, Second Leg	Real Madrid	4–0 (5–0 agg.)	Athletic Bilbao	Madrid
	Robinho 29', 89'; Ramos 64'; Soldado 86'			Stadium: Santiago Bernabéu; Referee: David Fernández Borbalán

18 January 2006 Quarter-finals, First Leg	Real Betis	0–1	Real Madrid	Seville
			Cassano 65'	Stadium: Estadio Manuel Ruiz de Lopera; Attendance: 50,000; Referee: Bernardino González Vázquez

25 January 2006 Quarter-finals, Second Leg	Real Madrid	1–0 (2–0 agg.)	Real Betis	Madrid
	Robinho 43'			Stadium: Santiago Bernabéu; Attendance: 62,000; Referee: Miguel Ángel Pérez Lasa

8 February 2006 Semi-finals, First Leg	Real Zaragoza	6–1	Real Madrid	Zaragoza
	Milito 14', 21', 34', 56'; Ewerthon 59', 82'		Baptista 37'	Stadium: La Romareda; Attendance: 32,000; Referee: Alfonso Pérez Burrull

14 February 2006 Semi-finals, Second Leg	Real Madrid	4–0 (5–6 agg.)	Real Zaragoza	Madrid
	Cicinho 1'; Robinho 5'; Ronaldo 10'; Roberto Carlos 60'			Stadium: Santiago Bernabéu; Attendance: 75,000; Referee: Bernardino González Vázquez

=== UEFA Champions League ===
==== Group F ====
Pos	Team	Pld	W	D	L	GF	GA	GD	Pts	Qualification	LYO	RMA	ROS	OLY
1	(France) Lyon	6	5	1	0	13	4	+9	16	Advance to knockout stage	—	3–0	2–1	2–1
2	(Spain) Real Madrid	6	3	1	2	10	8	+2	10	Advance to knockout stage	1–1	—	4–1	2–1
3	(Norway) Rosenborg	6	1	1	4	6	11	−5	4	Transfer to UEFA Cup	0–1	0–2	—	1–1
4	(Greece) Olympiacos	6	1	1	4	7	13	−6	4		1–4	2–1	1–3	—

Source: RSSSF

13 September 2005	Lyon (France)	3–0	(Spain) Real Madrid	Lyon, France
20:45 (20:45 UTC+2)	Carew 21'; Juninho 26'; Wiltord 31'	Report		Stadium: Stade de Gerland; Attendance: 40,300; Referee: (Italy) Massimo De Santis

28 September 2005	Real Madrid (Spain)	2–1	(Greece) Olympiacos	Madrid, Spain
20:45 (20:45 UTC+2)	Raúl 9'; Soldado 86'	Report	Kafes 48'	Stadium: Santiago Bernabéu Stadium; Attendance: 50,000; Referee: (Germany) Markus Merk

19 October 2005	Real Madrid (Spain)	4–1	(Norway) Rosenborg	Madrid, Spain
20:45 (20:45 UTC+2)	Woodgate 48'; Raúl 52'; Helguera 68'; Beckham 82'	Report	Strand 40'	Stadium: Santiago Bernabéu Stadium; Attendance: 53,000; Referee: (England) Steve Bennett

1 November 2005	Rosenborg (Norway)	0–2	(Spain) Real Madrid	Trondheim, Norway
20:45 (20:45 UTC+1)		Report	Dorsin 26' (o.g.); Guti 41'	Stadium: Lerkendal Stadion; Attendance: 21,270; Referee: (Germany) Wolfgang Stark

23 November 2005	Real Madrid (Spain)	1–1	(France) Lyon	Madrid, Spain
20:45 (20:45 UTC+1)	Guti 41'	Report	Carew 72'	Stadium: Santiago Bernabéu Stadium; Attendance: 65,000; Referee: (Belgium) Frank De Bleeckere

6 December 2005	Olympiacos (Greece)	2–1	(Spain) Real Madrid	Piraeus, Greece
20:45 (21:45 UTC+2)	Bulut 50'; Rivaldo 87'	Report	Ramos 7'	Stadium: Karaiskakis Stadium; Attendance: 30,000; Referee: (Denmark) Kim Milton Nielsen

==== Round of 16 ====
21 February 2006	Real Madrid (Spain)	0–1	(England) Arsenal	Madrid, Spain
		Report	Henry 47'	Stadium: Santiago Bernabéu Stadium; Attendance: 70,000; Referee: (Italy) Stefano Farina

8 March 2006	Arsenal (England)	0–0 (1–0 agg.)	(Spain) Real Madrid	London, England
		Report		Stadium: Highbury; Attendance: 35,500; Referee: (Slovakia) Ľuboš Micheľ

=== Top scorers ===
- (Brazil) Ronaldo – 14
- (France) Zinedine Zidane – 9
- (Brazil) Júlio Baptista – 8
- (Brazil) Robinho – 8
- (Spain) Raúl – 5
- (Brazil) Roberto Carlos – 5

== Statistics ==
=== Players statistics ===
No.	Pos	Nat	Player	Total		La Liga		Copa del Rey		Champions League	
No.	Pos	Nat	Player	Apps	Goals	Apps	Goals	Apps	Goals	Apps	Goals
1	GK	(Spain) ESP	Casillas	48	-51	37	-38	3+1	-6	7	-7
2	DF	(Spain) ESP	Salgado	35	0	26+1	0	3	0	4+1	0
4	DF	(Spain) ESP	Ramos	46	6	32+1	4	6	1	7	1
6	DF	(Spain) ESP	Helguera	27	1	18+1	0	3+1	0	4	1
3	DF	(Brazil) BRA	Roberto Carlos	45	6	35	5	3	1	7	0
23	DM	(England) ENG	Beckham	44	5	30+1	3	5+1	1	7	1
14	DM	(Spain) ESP	Guti	44	4	28+5	4	4	0	5+2	0
5	AM	(France) FRA	Zidane	38	9	24+5	9	2+3	0	4	0
8	AM	(Brazil) BRA	Júlio Baptista	45	9	25+7	8	6	1	4+3	0
9	FW	(Brazil) BRA	Ronaldo	27	15	21+2	14	2	1	2	0
10	FW	(Brazil) BRA	Robinho	51	12	31+6	8	6	4	7+1	0
13	GK	(Spain) ESP	Diego López	6	-3	1+1	-1	3	-0	1	-2
7	FW	(Spain) ESP	Raúl	32	7	20+6	5	0	0	5+1	2
11	DF	(Brazil) BRA	Cicinho	24	3	15+4	2	3+1	1	1	0
12	MF	(Uruguay) URU	Pablo García	26	0	17+5	0	0	0	4	0
15	DF	(Spain) ESP	Bravo	22	2	8+7	2	3+1	0	2+1	0
16	MF	(Denmark) DEN	Gravesen	29	0	10+7	0	6	0	4+2	0
17	FW	(Spain) ESP	Soldado	4	0	0	0	3+1	0		
18	DF	(England) ENG	Woodgate	14	1	7+2	0	1+1	0	3	1
19	FW	(Italy) ITA	Cassano	17	2	3+9	1	1+3	1	0+1	0
20	DF	(Spain) ESP	Miñambres								
21	DF	(Uruguay) URU	Diogo	20	0	7+6	0	1+1	0	4+1	0
22	DF	(Spain) ESP	Pavon	14	0	9+1	0	0+1	0	3	0
24	DF	(Spain) ESP	Mejía	22	1	13+4	1	2	0	0+3	0
27	FW	(Spain) ESP	Soldado	13	3	1+10	2	0	0	1+1	1
28	MF	(Spain) ESP	De la Red	5	0	0+3	0	0	0	1+1	0
24	FW	(Equatorial Guinea) EQG	Balboa	4	0	0+2	0	0+1	0	1	0
29	MF	(Spain) ESP	Jurado	4	0	0+3	0	0	0	0+1	0
40	FW	(Spain) ESP	Adrian	1	0	0	0	0	0	0+1	0

- Source: https://www.bdfutbol.com/en/t/t2005-062.html

== See also ==
- 2005–06 La Liga
- 2005–06 Copa del Rey
- 2005–06 UEFA Champions League
