= 2001–02 Real Madrid CF season =

100th season in existence of Real Madrid CF

Real Madrid
2001–02 season
- President: Florentino Pérez
- Head coach: Vicente del Bosque
- Stadium: Santiago Bernabéu
- La Liga: 3rd
- Copa del Rey: Runners-up
- Supercopa de España: Winners
- UEFA Champions League: Winners
- FIFA Club World Championship: Cancelled
- Top goalscorer: League: Fernando Morientes (18); All: Raúl (29)
- Average home league attendance: 63,645
Home colours	Away colours	Third colours

The 2001–02 season was Real Madrid's 71st season in La Liga. This article lists all matches that the club played in the 2001–02 season, and also shows statistics of the club's players. Although German home appliance giant Teka appeared as a shirt sponsor earlier in the season, Realmadrid.com replaced it as the primary shirt sponsor later in 2001, and there was no shirt sponsor for the second half of the season. The club introduced new grey and black third kits as well.

== Summary ==
Real Madrid endured its worst domestic league performance under Vicente del Bosque's management, finishing only third in the league standings (with 66 points), as well as losing the Copa del Rey final at the Bernabéu to unheralded Deportivo La Coruña, despite the club's world record signing of Zinedine Zidane from Juventus. On a brighter note, del Bosque delivered La Novena's UEFA Champions League title as a consolation prize, following a 2–1 victory against Bayer Leverkusen in the final thanks to Zidane's volley goal.

=== Centennial kit ===
The club wore a special kit throughout the 2002 year.

Centennial

== First-team squad ==
Note: Flags indicate national team as defined under FIFA eligibility rules; some limited exceptions apply. Players may hold more than one non-FIFA nationality.

No.	Pos.	Nation	Player
1	GK	ESP	Iker Casillas
2	DF	ESP	Míchel Salgado
3	DF	BRA	Roberto Carlos
4	DF	ESP	Fernando Hierro
5	MF	FRA	Zinedine Zidane
6	DF	ESP	Iván Helguera
7	FW	ESP	Raúl
8	MF	ENG	Steve McManaman
9	FW	ESP	Fernando Morientes
10	MF	POR	Luís Figo
11	MF	BRA	Sávio
12	DF	ESP	Iván Campo
13	GK	ESP	César
14	MF	ESP	Guti
15	MF	CMR	Geremi
16	MF	BRA	Flávio Conceição

No.	Pos.	Nation	Player
17	MF	ESP	Alberto Rivera
18	DF	ESP	Aitor Karanka
19	MF	BIH	Elvir Baljić
20	MF	ESP	Albert Celades
21	MF	ARG	Santiago Solari
22	DF	ESP	Francisco Pavón
23	FW	ESP	Pedro Munitis
24	MF	FRA	Claude Makélélé
26	DF	ESP	Óscar Miñambres
27	GK	ESP	Carlos Sánchez
28	MF	ESP	Álvaro Benito
29	DF	ESP	Borja
30	DF	ESP	Raúl Bravo
32	MF	ESP	Valdo
33	DF	ESP	Rubén
39	FW	ESP	Javier Portillo

=== Transfers ===
In
Pos.	Name	from	Type
MF	Zinedine Zidane	Juventus	€72,0 million
FW	Edwin Congo	Toulouse	loan ended

Out
Pos.	Name	To	Type
GK	Bodo Illgner		retired
DF	Manuel Sanchis		retired
FW	Tote	Real Valladolid	
MF	Perica Ognjenović	1. FC Kaiserslautern	

==== Winter ====
In
Pos.	Name	from	Type

Out
Pos.	Name	To	Type
FW	Elvir Baljić	Rayo Vallecano	loan
DF	Alberto Rivera Pizarro	Marseille	
DF	Carlos Aranda	Numancia	

== Results ==
=== Friendlies ===
Game	Date	Tournament	Round	Ground	Opponent	Score^{1}	Report
1	2001-07-27	Friendly	—	A	Lausanne-Sport	2–1	Referee / Markus Nobs; Lausanne-Sport / Real Madrid; 61' Kuzba / 3' Raúl; 83' Guti
2	2001-07-29	Friendly	—	A	Stade Nyonnais	12–1	Referee / Guido Wildhaber; Stade Nyonnais / Real Madrid; 82' Joly / 4' Zidane; 8' McManaman; 19' Miñambres; 33', 55' Baljić; 61', 69', 78', 80' Congo; 65' Rivera; 77' Álvaro; 90' Rodrigo
3	2001-08-01	Ciudad de Alicante Trophy	—	N	Montpellier	1–0	Referee / Arcas Piqueres; Real Madrid / Montpellier; 34' Guti
4	2001-08-04	Friendly	—	A	Al Ahly	0–1	Report / Report link; Referee / Al-Ghandour; Al Ahly / Real Madrid; 50' Sunday
5	2001-08-10	Teresa Herrera Trophy	Semi-final	N	Cruz Azul	1–1 (3–1 pen.)	Referee / Pérez Burrul; Real Madrid / Cruz Azul; 88' Raúl / 56' Zepeda
6	2001-08-11	Teresa Herrera Trophy	Final	A	Deportivo La Coruña	1–2	Referee / Iturralde González (Spain); Deportivo La Coruña / Real Madrid; 52' Makaay; 75' Tristán / 47' Figo
7	2001-08-14	Trofeo Santiago Bernabéu	—	H	Internazionale	1–2	Referee / Mejuto González; Real Madrid / Internazionale; 80' (pen.) Hierro / 5' Vieri; 89' Adriano
8	2001-08-31	Ciudad de Cartagena Trophy	—	A	Cartagonova	5–1	Referee / Cerezuela Caravaca; Cartagonova / Real Madrid; 66' Artigas / 11', 44' Munitis; 19', 85' Geremi; 74' Congo
9	2002-01-02	Trofeo Madrid 2012	—	H	Atlético Madrid	3–2	Referee / Carolina Domenech; Real Madrid / Atlético Madrid; 18' Raúl; 52' Helguera; 71' Celades / 44' Torres; 80' Roberto
10	2002-05-07	Ex-Real Madrid players Tribute	—	H	Japan	1–0	Referee / Esquinas Torres; Japan / Real Madrid; 27' Congo
11	2002-05-23	Friendly	—	A	Talavera	4–1	Referee / Jimenez Moreno (Spain); Talavera / Real Madrid; 62' Morilla / 11', 26' Congo; 34' Sestelo; 53' Riki

Last updated: 2008-07-17
Source: Temporada 2001–02
^{1}Real Madrid goals come first.
Country's flag depict country of foreign team to that of Real Madrid.
Ground: H = Home; A = Away; N = Neutral; HR = Home replacement; AR = Away replacement; GD = Goal difference

=== La Liga ===
==== League table ====
Pos	Team	Pld	W	D	L	GF	GA	GD	Pts	Qualification or relegation
1	Valencia (C)	38	21	12	5	51	27	+24	75	Qualification for the Champions League group stage
2	Deportivo La Coruña	38	20	8	10	65	41	+24	68	Qualification for the Champions League group stage
3	Real Madrid (Note: Real Madrid qualified directly for the 2002–03 UEFA Champions League as holders.)	38	19	9	10	69	44	+25	66	Qualification for the Champions League group stage
4	Barcelona	38	18	10	10	65	37	+28	64	Qualification for the Champions League third qualifying round
5	Celta Vigo	38	16	12	10	64	46	+18	60	Qualification for the UEFA Cup first round

Source: LFP
Rules for classification: 1st points; 2nd head-to-head points; 3rd head-to-head goal difference; 4th head-to-head goals scored; 5th goal difference; 6th number of goals scored; 7th Fair-play points
(C) Champions

==== Results by round ====
Round	1	2	3	4	5	6	7	8	9	10	11	12	13	14	15	16	17	18	19	20	21	22	23	24	25	26	27	28	29	30	31	32	33	34	35	36	37	38
Ground	A	H	A	H	H	A	H	A	H	A	H	A	H	A	H	A	H	A	H	H	A	H	A	A	H	A	H	A	H	A	H	A	H	A	H	A	H	A
Result	L	D	L	W	D	L	W	D	D	W	W	L	W	W	W	W	W	D	W	W	D	D	L	L	W	L	W	W	W	D	W	W	W	L	W	L	D	L
Position	15	16	18	11	12	14	13	16	15	10	7	11	7	7	5	3	1	2	1	1	1	1	2	3	1	2	2	2	2	1	1	1	1	2	2	2	2	3

Updated to match(es) played on 2008-07-16. Source: LFP.com
A = Away; H = Home; W = Win; D = Draw; L = Loss; = Leader, 2002-03 UEFA Champions League Group stage; = 2002-03 UEFA Champions League Group stage; = 2002-03 UEFA Champions League Qualifying round; = 2002-03 UEFA Cup; = 2002-03 Segunda Division

==== Matches ====
25 August 2001 1	Valencia	1–0	Real Madrid	Valencia
21:30 CEST	Angulo 7'	Report		Stadium: Mestalla

8 September 2001 2	Real Madrid	1–1	Málaga	Madrid
21:00 CEST	Roberto Carlos 14'	Report	Sanz 75'	Stadium: Santiago Bernabéu

15 September 2001 3	Real Betis	3–1	Real Madrid	Sevilla
21:30 CEST	Casas 12'; Capi 48'; Joaquín 57'	Report	Zidane 13'	Stadium: Estadio Benito Villamarín

22 September 2001 4	Real Madrid	5–1	Espanyol	Madrid
21:00 CEST	Zidane 3'; Roberto Carlos 11'; Figo 20' (pen.); Raúl 59'; McManaman 70'	Report	De Lucas 46'	Stadium: Santiago Bernabéu

29 September 2001 5	Real Madrid	2–2	Valladolid	Madrid
21:30 CEST	Zidane 5'; Raúl 18'	Report	Sales 6'; Blanco 89'	Stadium: Santiago Bernabéu

3 October 2001 6	Las Palmas	4–2	Real Madrid	Las Palmas de Gran Canaria
21:30 WEST	Lago Ballesteros 8'; Larena 35'; Castro 74', 90'	Report	Munitis 32'; Zidane 42'	Stadium: Estadio Insular

6 October 2001 7	Real Madrid	2–0	Athletic Bilbao	Madrid
19:00 CEST	Raúl 46'; Solari 73'	Report		Stadium: Santiago Bernabéu

13 October 2001 8	Alavés	0–0	Real Madrid	Vitoria-Gasteiz
21:30 CEST		Report		Stadium: Mendizorrotza Stadium

21 October 2001 9	Real Madrid	1–1	Celta Vigo	Madrid
19:00 CEST	Guti 25'	Report	Catanha 8'	Stadium: Santiago Bernabéu

27 October 2001 10	Villarreal	2–3	Real Madrid	Villarreal
20:30 CEST	Víctor 30'; Calleja 65'	Report	Figo 63'; Munitis 83'; Raúl 88'	Stadium: El Madrigal

4 November 2001 11	Real Madrid	2–0	Barcelona	Madrid
20:00 CET	Morientes 24'; Figo 89'	Report		Stadium: Santiago Bernabéu

11 November 2001 12	Real Zaragoza	2–1	Real Madrid	Zaragoza
17:00 CET	Yordi 22'; Acuña 90'	Report	Raúl 56'	Stadium: La Romareda

17 November 2001 13	Real Madrid	2–1	Sevilla	Madrid
19:30 CET	Morientes 41', 53'	Report	Moisés 71'	Stadium: Santiago Bernabéu

25 November 2001 14	Rayo Vallecano	0–3	Real Madrid	Madrid
17:00 CET		Report	Raúl 1'; Morientes 27', 68'	Stadium: Vallecas

1 December 2001 15	Real Madrid	2–1	Osasuna	Madrid
19:30 CET	Morientes 12'; Raúl 15'	Report	Aloisi 84'	Stadium: Santiago Bernabéu

8 December 2001 16	Tenerife	0–2	Real Madrid	Santa Cruz de Tenerife
21:00 WET		Report	Helguera 15'; Figo 90'	Stadium: Heliodoro Rodríguez López

15 December 2001 17	Real Madrid	3–1	Real Sociedad	Madrid
19:30 CET	Kvarme 45' (o.g.); Raúl 60'; Figo 77'	Report	Khokhlov 39'	Stadium: Santiago Bernabéu

23 December 2001 18	Mallorca	1–1	Real Madrid	Palma
17:00 CET	Luque 69'	Report	Raúl 55'	Stadium: Iberostar

5 January 2002 19	Real Madrid	3–1	Deportivo	Madrid
	Morientes 6'; Zidane 8'; Raúl 63'	Report	Makaay 6'	Stadium: Santiago Bernabéu

13 January 2002 20	Real Madrid	1–0	Valencia	Madrid
	Morientes 70'	Report		Stadium: Santiago Bernabéu

19 January 2000 21	Málaga	1–1	Real Madrid	Málaga
	Dely Valdés 25'	Report	Morientes 68'	Stadium: La Rosaleda

27 January 2002 22	Real Madrid	1–1	Real Betis	Madrid
	Helguera 45'	Report	Juanito 88'	Stadium: Santiago Bernabéu

3 February 2002 23	Espanyol	2–1	Real Madrid	Barcelona
	De Lucas 32'; Tamudo 73'	Report	Raúl 1'	Stadium: Olímpic Lluís Companys

6 February 2002 24	Valladolid	2–1	Real Madrid	Valladolid
	Fernando 59'; Jesús Sánchez 89'		Morientes 73'	Stadium: Estadio José Zorrilla

10 February 2002 25	Real Madrid	7–0	Las Palmas	Madrid
	Morientes 20', 35', 52', 70', 79'; Zidane 32'; Á. Sánchez 70' (o.g.)	Report		Stadium: Santiago Bernabéu

16 February 2002 26	Athletic Bilbao	2–1	Real Madrid	Bilbao
	Tiko 28'; Del Horno 45'	Report	Morientes 55'	Stadium: San Mamés

23 February 2002 27	Real Madrid	3–1	Alavés	Madrid
	Guti 45'; Raúl 60'; Hierro 79' (pen.)	Report	Witschge 7'	Stadium: Santiago Bernabéu

2 March 2002 28	Celta Vigo	0–1	Real Madrid	Vigo
		Report	Raúl 83'	Stadium: Balaídos

9 March 2002 29	Real Madrid	3–0	Villarreal	Madrid
	Raúl 14'; Hierro 61' (pen.); McManaman 66'	Report		Stadium: Santiago Bernabéu

16 March 2002 30	Barcelona	1–1	Real Madrid	Barcelona
	Xavi 59'	Report	Zidane 39'	Stadium: Camp Nou

24 March 2002 31	Real Madrid	3–1	Real Zaragoza	Madrid
	Hierro 14', 58' (pen.), 80'	Report	Milošević 78'	Stadium: Santiago Bernabéu

30 March 2002 32	Sevilla	0–1	Real Madrid	Sevilla
		Report	Makélélé 23'	Stadium: Ramón Sánchez Pizjuán

6 April 2002 33	Real Madrid	3–1	Rayo Vallecano	Madrid
	Etxeberría 11' (o.g.); Morientes 37'; Figo 78' (pen.)	Report	Miguel 87'	Stadium: Santiago Bernabéu

14 April 2002 34	Osasuna	3–1	Real Madrid	Pamplona
	Fernando 32'; Sánchez 39'; Rosado 74'	Report	Morientes 49'	Stadium: El Sadar

20 April 2002 35	Real Madrid	4–1	Tenerife	Madrid
	Roberto Carlos 16'; Figo 43'; Guti 76', 84'	Report	Venta 39'	Stadium: Santiago Bernabéu

27 April 2002 36	Real Sociedad	3–0	Real Madrid	San Sebastián
	Kovačević 58' (pen.); Khokhlov 84'; De Paula 90'	Report		Stadium: Anoeta

5 May 2002 37	Real Madrid	0–0	Mallorca	Madrid
		Report		Stadium: Santiago Bernabéu

10 May 2002 38	Deportivo	3–0	Real Madrid	A Coruña
	Makaay 45'; Fran 73'; Pandiani 90'	Report		Stadium: Riazor

==== Results summary ====
Overall								Home						Away					
Pld	W	D	L	GF	GA	GD	Pts	W	D	L	GF	GA	GD	W	D	L	GF	GA	GD
38	19	9	10	69	44	+25	66	14	5	0	48	14	+34	5	4	10	21	30	−9

Source: LFP

=== Copa del Rey ===
==== Round of 64 ====
10 October 2001	Pájara Playas	0–4	Real Madrid	Pájara
			Guti 27', 47', 73'; Sávio 77'	Stadium: Estadio Benito Alonso; Referee: Rafael Ramírez Domínguez

==== Round of 32 ====
28 November 2001	Lanzarote	1–3	Real Madrid	Lanzarote
	Ramos 41'		Celades 24'; Guti 58'; Pavón 71'	Stadium: Ciudad Deportiva de Lanzarote; Referee: Miguel Ángel Pérez Lasa

==== Round of 16 ====
12 December 2001	Gimnàstic de Tarragona	1–0	Real Madrid	Tarragona
	Karanka 83' (o.g.)			Stadium: Nou Estadi; Attendance: 13,000; Referee: Arturo Daudén Ibáñez

18 December 2001	Real Madrid	4–2 (4–3 agg.)	Gimnàstic de Tarragona	Madrid
	Raúl 4', 45+1', 48'; Guti 30'		Cuéllar 2'; Herrero 15'	Stadium: Santiago Bernabéu; Attendance: 5,000; Referee: Fernando Carmona Méndez

==== Quarter-finals ====
8 January 2002	Real Madrid	4–0	Rayo Vallecano	Madrid
	Roberto Carlos 33'; Raúl 78'; Zidane 81'; Figo 84'			Stadium: Santiago Bernabéu; Attendance: 42,000; Referee: Eduardo Iturralde González

16 January 2002	Rayo Vallecano	1–0 (1–4 agg.)	Real Madrid	Madrid
	Peragón 90'			Stadium: Teresa Rivero; Attendance: 5,000; Referee: Luis Medina Cantalejo

==== Semi-finals ====
23 January 2002	Athletic Bilbao	2–1	Real Madrid	Bilbao
	Etxeberria 64'; Urzaiz 85'		Zidane 4'	Stadium: San Mamés; Attendance: 42,000; Referee: Juan Fernández Marín

30 January 2002	Real Madrid	3–0 (4–2 agg.)	Athletic Bilbao	Madrid
	Larrainzar 51' (o.g.); Raúl 58'; Guti 75'			Stadium: Santiago Bernabéu; Attendance: 75,000; Referee: Julián Rodríguez Santiago

==== Final ====
6 March 2002	Real Madrid	1–2	Deportivo La Coruña	Madrid
	Raúl 58'		Sergio 6'; Tristán 37'	Stadium: Santiago Bernabéu; Attendance: 75,000; Referee: Manuel Mejuto González

=== Supercopa de España ===
19 August 2001 First leg	Zaragoza	1–1	Real Madrid	Zaragoza
21:45 CET (UTC+1)	Yordi 79'		Conceição 54'	Stadium: La Romareda; Attendance: 26,800; Referee: López Nieto

22 August 2001 Second leg	Real Madrid	3–0 (4–1 agg.)	Zaragoza	Madrid
21:45 CET (UTC+1)	Raúl 74', 81', 89'			Stadium: Santiago Bernabéu; Attendance: 70,000; Referee: Iturralde González

=== Champions League ===
==== Group A ====
Pos	Team	Pld	W	D	L	GF	GA	GD	Pts	Qualification	RMA	ROM	LMO	AND
1	(Spain) Real Madrid	6	4	1	1	13	5	+8	13	Advance to second group stage	—	1–1	4–0	4–1
2	(Italy) Roma	6	2	3	1	6	5	+1	9	Advance to second group stage	1–2	—	2–1	1–1
3	(Russia) Lokomotiv Moscow	6	2	1	3	9	9	0	7	Transfer to UEFA Cup	2–0	0–1	—	1–1
4	(Belgium) Anderlecht	6	0	3	3	4	13	−9	3		0–2	0–0	1–5	—

Source: RSSSF

11 September 2001 1	Roma (Italy)	1–2	(Spain) Real Madrid	Rome, Italy
20:45	Totti 73' (pen.)		Figo 50'; Guti 63'	Stadium: Stadio Olimpico; Attendance: 61,376; Referee: Graham Poll (England)

19 September 2001 2	Real Madrid (Spain)	4–0	(Russia) Lokomotiv Moscow	Madrid, Spain
20:45	Munitis 39'; Figo 64' (pen.); Roberto Carlos 81'; Sávio 87'			Stadium: Santiago Bernabéu; Attendance: 40,000; Referee: Stéphane Bré (France)

26 September 2001 3	Real Madrid (Spain)	4–1	(Belgium) Anderlecht	Madrid, Spain
20:45	Celades 49'; Raúl 51', 68'; Solari 79'		Dindane 33'	Stadium: Santiago Bernabéu Stadium; Attendance: 40,000; Referee: Terje Hauge (Norway)

16 October 2001 4	Anderlecht (Belgium)	0–2	(Spain) Real Madrid	Brussels, Belgium
20:45			Roberto Carlos 19'; McManaman 35'	Stadium: Constant Vanden Stock Stadium; Attendance: 22,000; Referee: Knud Erik Fisker (Denmark)

24 October 2001 5	Real Madrid (Spain)	1–1	(Italy) Roma	Madrid, Spain
20:45	Figo 75' (pen.)		Totti 35'	Stadium: Santiago Bernabéu; Attendance: 65,000; Referee: Hellmut Krug (Germany)

30 October 2001 6	Lokomotiv Moscow (Russia)	2–0	(Spain) Real Madrid
18:45	Buznikin 30'; Cherevchenko 50'

==== Group C ====
Pos	Team	Pld	W	D	L	GF	GA	GD	Pts	Qualification	RMA	PAN	SPP	POR
1	(Spain) Real Madrid	6	5	1	0	14	5	+9	16	Advance to knockout stage	—	3–0	3–0	1–0
2	(Greece) Panathinaikos	6	2	2	2	7	8	−1	8	Advance to knockout stage	2–2	—	2–1	0–0
3	(Czech Republic) Sparta Prague	6	2	0	4	6	10	−4	6		2–3	0–2	—	2–0
4	(Portugal) Porto	6	1	1	4	3	7	−4	4		1–2	2–1	0–1	—

Source: RSSSF

21 November 2001 1	Sparta Prague (Czech Republic)	2–3	(Spain) Real Madrid	Prague, Czech Republic
20:45	Michalík 30'; Sionko 72'	Report	Zidane 20'; Morientes 36', 74'	Stadium: Stadion Letná

4 December 2001 2	Real Madrid (Spain)	3–0	(Greece) Panathinaikos	Madrid, Spain
20:45	Helguera 41'; Raúl 66', 72'	Report		Stadium: Santiago Bernabéu

19 February 2002 3	Real Madrid (Spain)	1–0	(Portugal) Porto	Madrid, Spain
20:45	Solari 83'	Report		Stadium: Santiago Bernabéu

27 February 2002 4	Porto (Portugal)	1–2	(Spain) Real Madrid	Porto, Portugal
20:45	Capucho 28'	Report	Solari 7'; Helguera 20'	Stadium: Estádio das Antas

12 March 2002 5	Real Madrid (Spain)	3–0	(Czech Republic) Sparta Prague	Madrid, Spain
20:45	Solari 60'; Guti 64'; Sávio 71'	Report		Stadium: Santiago Bernabéu

20 March 2002 6	Panathinaikos (Greece)	2–2	(Spain) Real Madrid	Athens, Greece
20:45	Liberopoulos 9'; Goumas 64'	Report	Morientes 11'; Portillo 80'	Stadium: Leoforos Alexandras Stadium

==== Quarter-finals ====
2 April 2002 First leg	Bayern Munich (Germany)	2–1	(Spain) Real Madrid	Munich, Germany
20:45 CEST	Sagnol (yellow card) 55'; Effenberg 81'; Pizarro 88'; Élber (yellow card) 89'; Kovač (yellow card) 89'	Report	Geremi 11'; Helguera (yellow card) 52'	Stadium: Olympiastadion; Attendance: 60,000; Referee: Hugh Dallas (Scotland)

10 April 2002 Second leg	Real Madrid (Spain)	2–0 (3–2 agg.)	(Germany) Bayern Munich	Madrid, Spain
20:45 CEST	Hierro (yellow card) 65'; Helguera 69'; Figo (yellow card) 70'; Solari (yellow card) 82'; Guti 85'	Report	Effenberg (yellow card) 23'; Jeremies (yellow card) 83'; Salihamidžić (red card) 90+4'	Stadium: Santiago Bernabéu; Attendance: 75,300; Referee: Stefano Braschi (Italy)

==== Semi-finals ====
23 April 2002 First leg	Barcelona (Spain)	0–2	(Spain) Real Madrid	Barcelona, Spain
20:45 CEST	Luis Enrique (yellow card) 10'; Kluivert (yellow card) 74'; Overmars (yellow card) 84'	Report	Zidane (yellow card) 30' (goal) 55'; Salgado (yellow card) 37'; César (yellow card) 73'; McManaman 90+2'	Stadium: Camp Nou; Attendance: 98,000; Referee: Anders Frisk (Sweden)

1 May 2002 Second leg	Real Madrid (Spain)	1–1 (3–1 agg.)	(Spain) Barcelona	Madrid, Spain
20:45 CEST	Raúl 43'; McManaman (yellow card) 82'; Conceição (yellow card) 86'	Report	Helguera 49' (o.g.); Puyol (yellow card) 61'	Stadium: Santiago Bernabéu; Attendance: 75,000; Referee: Pierluigi Collina (Italy)

==== Final ====
15 May 2002	Bayer Leverkusen (Germany)	1–2	(Spain) Real Madrid	Glasgow. Scotland
19:45	Lúcio 13'		Raúl 8'; Zidane 45'	Stadium: Hampden Park; Attendance: 52,000; Referee: Urs Meier

=== FIFA Club World Championship ===
As winners of the 1999–2000 UEFA Champions League, Real Madrid was one of the 12 teams that were invited to the 2001 FIFA Club World Championship, which was scheduled to be hosted in Spain from 28 July to 12 August 2001. However, the tournament was cancelled, primarily due to the collapse of ISL, which was the marketing partner of FIFA at the time.

Since the fixtures were already released prior to the tournament's cancellation, it is known that Real Madrid would have played its group stage matches at the Bernabéu.

==== Group stage ====
31 July 2001 1	Real Madrid (Spain)	Cancelled	(Japan) Júbilo Iwata	Madrid, Spain
				Stadium: Santiago Bernabéu

3 August 2001 2	Los Angeles Galaxy (United States)	Cancelled	(Spain) Real Madrid	Madrid, Spain
				Stadium: Santiago Bernabéu

6 August 2001 3	Real Madrid (Spain)	Cancelled	(Ghana) Hearts of Oak	Madrid, Spain
				Stadium: Santiago Bernabéu

== Statistics ==
=== Appearances and goals ===
No.	Pos	Nat	Player	Total		La Liga		Copa del Rey		UEFA Champions League	
No.	Pos	Nat	Player	Apps	Goals	Apps	Goals	Apps	Goals	Apps	Goals
1	GK	(Spain) ESP	Casillas	39	-11	25	0	5	-5	9	-6
2	DF	(Spain) ESP	Salgado	54	0	35	0	5	0	13+1	0
4	DF	(Spain) ESP	Hierro	47	5	30	5	3	0	14	0
6	DF	(Spain) ESP	Iván Helguera	44	5	25+1	2	6	0	11+1	3
22	DF	(Spain) ESP	Pavon	45	1	26+2	0	7	1	9+1	0
3	DF	(Brazil) BRA	Roberto Carlos	50	6	31	3	6	1	13	2
10	MF	(Portugal) POR	Luís Figo	45	11	27+1	7	5+1	1	11	3
24	MF	(France) FRA	Makélélé	51	1	32	1	6	0	13	0
5	MF	(France) FRA	Zidane	47	12	31	7	6+1	2	9	3
7	FW	(Spain) ESP	Raul	53	26	34+1	14	6	6	12	6
9	FW	(Spain) ESP	Morientes	49	22	28+5	19	3+2	0	8+3	3
13	GK	(Spain) ESP	César	25	-12	12	0	4	-4	9	-8
21	MF	(Argentina) ARG	Solari	50	5	14+13	1	3+6	0	9+5	4
8	MF	(England) ENG	McManaman	40	4	13+10	2	3+1	0	6+7	2
14	MF	(Spain) ESP	Guti	45	13	9+20	4	5+2	6	7+2	3
16	MF	(Brazil) BRA	Flávio Conceição	20	1	7+2	0	1+1	1	5+4	0
18	DF	(Spain) ESP	Aitor Karanka	20	0	7	0	7	0	5+1	0
23	FW	(Spain) ESP	Munitis	39	3	6+18	2	4+3	0	4+4	1
20	MF	(Spain) ESP	Albert Celades	27	2	6+8	0	4	1	7+2	1
30	DF	(Spain) ESP	Raúl Bravo	14	0	6	0	3+1	0	4	0
15	MF	(Cameroon) CMR	Geremi	15	1	4+4	0	2	0	3+2	1
12	DF	(Spain) ESP	Iván Campo	7	0	2+1	0	1+1	0	1+1	0
27	GK	(Spain) ESP	Carlos Sánchez	2	0	1	0	0+1	0	0	0
33	DF	(Spain) ESP	Rubén	7	0	1	0	1+2	0	1+2	0
26	DF	(Spain) ESP	Óscar Miñambres	9	0	1	0	2+2	0	3+1	0
11	MF	(Brazil) BRA	Sávio	14	2	0+9	0	1	0	2+2	2
32	MF	(Spain) ESP	Valdo	3	0	0+1	0	0+2	0	0	0
39	FW	(Spain) ESP	Javier Portillo	1	1	0	0	0	0	0+1	1
Players transferred out during the season
17	MF	(Spain) ESP	Alberto Rivera	2	0	0	0	1+1	0	0	0
19	MF	(Bosnia and Herzegovina) BIH	Elvir Baljić	1	0	0	0	0+1	0	0	0
35	FW	(Spain) ESP	Carlos Aranda	1	0	0	0	0+1	0	0	0

Last updated: 30 May 2002
Source: Competitions
