= 2004–05 Real Madrid CF season =

104th season in existence of Real Madrid CF

Real Madrid
2004–05 season
- President: Florentino Pérez
- Head coach: José Antonio Camacho (until 20 September 2004); Mariano García Remón (from 20 September to 30 December 2004); Vanderlei Luxemburgo (from 30 December 2004)
- Stadium: Santiago Bernabéu
- La Liga: 2nd
- Copa del Rey: Round of 16
- UEFA Champions League: Round of 16
- Top goalscorer: League: Ronaldo (21); All: Ronaldo (24)
Home colours	Away colours	Third colours

The 2004–05 season was Real Madrid CF's 74th season in La Liga. This article lists all matches that the club played in the 2004–05 season, and also shows statistics of the club's players.

Real Madrid finished the season trophyless for the first time since 1995–96.

== First-team squad ==
Note: Flags indicate national team as defined under FIFA eligibility rules; some limited exceptions apply. Players may hold more than one non-FIFA nationality.

No.	Pos.	Nation	Player
1	GK	ESP	Iker Casillas
2	DF	ESP	Míchel Salgado
3	DF	BRA	Roberto Carlos
4	MF	ESP	Borja
5	MF	FRA	Zinedine Zidane
6	DF	ESP	Iván Helguera
7	FW	ESP	Raúl (captain)
9	FW	BRA	Ronaldo
10	MF	POR	Luís Figo
11	FW	ENG	Michael Owen
13	GK	ESP	César Sánchez
14	MF	ESP	Guti (vice-captain)
15	DF	ESP	Raúl Bravo
16	MF	DEN	Thomas Gravesen

No.	Pos.	Nation	Player
18	DF	ENG	Jonathan Woodgate
19	DF	ARG	Walter Samuel
20	MF	ESP	Albert Celades
21	MF	ARG	Santiago Solari
22	DF	ESP	Francisco Pavón
23	MF	ENG	David Beckham
24	DF	ESP	Álvaro Mejía
25	GK	ESP	Diego López
27	DF	ESP	Álvaro Arbeloa
28	DF	ESP	Miguel Palencia
31	MF	ESP	Rubén de la Red
32	MF	ESP	Juanfran
35	DF	ESP	Javi García
43	MF	ESP	Jotha

=== Left club during season ===
Note: Flags indicate national team as defined under FIFA eligibility rules; some limited exceptions apply. Players may hold more than one non-FIFA nationality.

No.	Pos.	Nation	Player
8	FW	ESP	Fernando Morientes (to Liverpool)
17	FW	ESP	Javier Portillo (on loan to Fiorentina)

No.	Pos.	Nation	Player
34	MF	ESP	Diego León (on loan to Arminia Bielefeld)

== Reserve squad ==
Note: Flags indicate national team as defined under FIFA eligibility rules; some limited exceptions apply. Players may hold more than one non-FIFA nationality.

No.	Pos.	Nation	Player
29	MF	ESP	Angelo
30	MF	ESP	Marcos Tébar
33	MF	ESP	José Manuel Jurado
36	MF	ESP	Álex Pérez
37	MF	ESP	Ernesto Gómez

No.	Pos.	Nation	Player
38	MF	ESP	Roberto Soldado
39	FW	ESP	Adrián
40	MF	ESP	Borja Valero
41	GK	ESP	Kiko Casilla
42	DF	ESP	Javier Paredes

== Transfers ==
=== In ===
No.	Pos.	Nat.	Name	Age	EU	Moving from	Type	Transfer window	Ends	Transfer fee	Source
19	DF	(Argentina)	Walter Samuel	26	Non-EU	Roma (Italy)	Transfer	Summer	2005	€24,000,000	
18	DF	(England)	Jonathan Woodgate	24	EU	Newcastle United (England)	Transfer	Summer	2007	€20,000,000	
11	FW	(England)	Michael Owen	24	EU	Liverpool (England)	Transfer	Summer	2005	€12,000,000	
16	MF	(Denmark)	Thomas Gravesen	28	EU	Everton (England)	Transfer	Winter	2006	€3,500,000	

Total spending: ▼€59,500,000

=== Out ===
No.	Pos.	Nat.	Name	Age	EU	Moving to	Type	Transfer window	Transfer fee	Source
19	FW	(Argentina)	Cambiasso	23	Non-EU	Internazionale (Italy)	Transfer	Summer	free	

Total income: ▲€0

== Pre-season and friendlies ==
25 July 2004 Friendly	Benfica	2–2	Real Madrid	Lisbon, Portugal
	Zahovič 1'; Geovanni 90+1'		Ronaldo 3'; Morientes 77'	Stadium: Estádio da Luz

29 July 2004 Friendly	JEF United Chiba	1–3	Real Madrid	Tokyo, Japan
	Marquinhos 7'		Guti 23'; Raúl 36'; Solari 90+3'	Stadium: National Stadium

1 August 2004 Friendly	Tokyo Verdy	0–4	Real Madrid	Tokyo, Japan
			Zidane 9'; Ronaldo 35'; Figo 78'; Morientes 81'	Stadium: Ajinomoto Stadium

5 August 2004 Friendly	Real Madrid	1–0	Getafe	Alicante, Spain
	Morientes 77'			Stadium: Estadio José Rico Pérez

31 August 2004 Trofeo Santiago Bernabéu	Real Madrid	0–1	Pumas UNAM	Madrid, Spain
			Castro 69'	Stadium: Santiago Bernabéu

30 December 2004 Jésus Gil Trophy	Atlético Madrid	1–1	Real Madrid	Madrid, Spain
	Ibagaza 75'		Soldado 28'	Stadium: Estadio La Peineta

== Competitions ==
=== Overview ===
Competition	First match	Last match	Starting round	Final position	Record							
Competition	First match	Last match	Starting round	Final position	Pld	W	D	L	GF	GA	GD	Win %
La Liga	29 August 2004	28 May 2005	Matchday 1	Runners-up	38	25	5	8	71	32	+39	65.79
Copa del Rey	26 October 2004	19 January 2005	Round of 64	Round of 16	4	2	2	0	5	3	+2	50.00
Champions League	11 August 2004	9 March 2005	Third qualifying round	Round of 16	10	6	2	2	17	11	+6	60.00
Total					52	33	9	10	93	46	+47	63.46

Last updated: 28 May 2005
Source: Soccerway

=== La Liga ===
==== League table ====
Pos	Team	Pld	W	D	L	GF	GA	GD	Pts	Qualification or relegation
1	Barcelona (C)	38	25	9	4	73	29	+44	84	Qualification for the Champions League group stage
2	Real Madrid	38	25	5	8	71	32	+39	80	Qualification for the Champions League group stage
3	Villarreal	38	18	11	9	69	37	+32	65	Qualification for the Champions League third qualifying round
4	Real Betis	38	16	14	8	62	50	+12	62	Qualification for the Champions League third qualifying round
5	Espanyol	38	17	10	11	54	46	+8	61	Qualification for the UEFA Cup first round

Source: LFP
Rules for classification: 1st points; 2nd head-to-head points; 3rd head-to-head goal difference; 4th head-to-head goals scored; 5th goal difference; 6th number of goals scored; 7th Fair-play points
(C) Champions

==== Results summary ====
Overall								Home						Away					
Pld	W	D	L	GF	GA	GD	Pts	W	D	L	GF	GA	GD	W	D	L	GF	GA	GD
38	25	5	8	71	32	+39	80	15	1	3	43	12	+31	10	4	5	28	20	+8

Last updated: 28 May 2005.
Source: La Liga

==== Result round by round ====
Round	1	2	3	4	5	6	7	8	9	10	11	12	13	14	15	16	17	18	19	20	21	22	23	24	25	26	27	28	29	30	31	32	33	34	35	36	37	38
Ground	A	H	A	H	A	H	A	H	H	A	H	A	H	A	H	A	H	A	H	H	A	H	A	H	A	H	A	A	H	A	H	A	H	A	H	A	H	A
Result	W	W	L	W	L	L	D	W	W	W	W	L	W	D	W	W	L	W	W	W	W	W	W	L	L	W	D	L	W	W	W	W	W	W	W	D	D	W
Position	6	3	8	3	8	10	10	6	3	2	2	2	2	3	3	2	2	2	2	2	2	2	2	2	2	2	2	2	2	2	2	2	2	2	2	2	2	2

Source: LFP.com
A = Away; H = Home; W = Win; D = Draw; L = Loss; = Leader, 2005-06 UEFA Champions League Group stage; = 2005-06 UEFA Champions League Group stage; = 2005-06 UEFA Champions League Qualifying round; = 2005-06 UEFA Cup; = 2005-06 Segunda Division

==== Matches ====
29 August 2004 1	Mallorca	0–1	Real Madrid	Mallorca
19:30		Report	Ronaldo 52'	Stadium: Estadi de Son Moix; Attendance: 23,000; Referee: Turienzo Álvarez

11 September 2004 2	Real Madrid	1–0	Numancia	Madrid
20:00	Beckham 17'	Report		Stadium: Santiago Bernabéu; Attendance: 66,315; Referee: Pérez Burrull

18 September 2004 3	Espanyol	1–0	Real Madrid	Barcelona
20:00	Rodríguez 42'	Report		Stadium: Estadi Olímpic Lluís Companys; Attendance: 39,500; Referee: Lizondo Cortés

21 September 2004 4	Real Madrid	1–0	Osasuna	Madrid
22:00	Beckham 61'	Report		Stadium: Santiago Bernabéu; Attendance: 65,000; Referee: Ramírez Domínguez

25 September 2004 5	Athletic Bilbao	2–1	Real Madrid	Bilbao
20:00	Urzaiz 11'; Ezquerro 44'	Report	Raúl 51'	Stadium: San Mamés Stadium; Attendance: 38,000; Referee: David Fernández Borbalán

3 October 2004 6	Real Madrid	0–1	Deportivo La Coruña	Madrid
21:00		Report	Luque 45'	Stadium: Santiago Bernabéu; Attendance: 67,415; Referee: Teixeira Vitienes

16 October 2004 7	Real Betis	1–1	Real Madrid	Seville
20:00	Ricardo Oliveira 30'	Report	Ronaldo 65'	Stadium: Estadio Benito Villamarín; Attendance: 45,000; Referee: Pino Zamorano

23 October 2004 8	Real Madrid	1–0	Valencia	Madrid
22:00	Owen 7'	Report		Stadium: Santiago Bernabéu; Attendance: 78,326; Referee: Pérez Lasa

31 October 2004 9	Real Madrid	2–0	Getafe	Madrid
19:00	Owen 28'; Ronaldo 78'	Report		Stadium: Santiago Bernabéu; Attendance: 75,000; Referee: Puentes Leira

7 November 2004 10	Málaga	0–2	Real Madrid	Málaga
19:00		Report	Figo 23' (pen.); Owen 78'	Stadium: La Rosaleda; Attendance: 30,000; Referee: Eduardo Iturralde González

14 November 2004 11	Real Madrid	6–1	Albacete	Madrid
19:00	Ronaldo 2', 90'; Zidane 29'; Raúl 32'; Samuel 48'; Owen 87'	Report	Francisco 15'	Stadium: Santiago Bernabéu; Attendance: 79,000; Referee: Xavier Moreno Delgado

20 November 2004 12	Barcelona	3–0	Real Madrid	Barcelona
22:00	Eto'o 29'; Van Bronckhorst 43'; Ronaldinho 77' (pen.)	Report		Stadium: Camp Nou; Attendance: 97,905; Referee: Alberto Undiano Mallenco

28 November 2004 13	Real Madrid	5–0	Levante	Madrid
19:00	Ronaldo 43', 51'; Figo 50'; Beckham 55'; Owen 87'	Report		Stadium: Santiago Bernabéu; Attendance: 76,000; Referee: Turienzo Álvarez

5 December 2004 14	Villarreal	0–0	Real Madrid	Villarreal
19:00		Report		Stadium: El Madrigal; Attendance: 21,000; Referee: Manuel Mejuto González

18 December 2004 16	Racing Santander	2–3	Real Madrid	Santander
20:00	Benayoun 24'; Guerrero 51'	Report	Owen 35'; Raúl 61'; Zidane 90+2'	Stadium: Campos de Sport de El Sardinero; Attendance: 17,300; Referee: César Muñiz Fernández

22 December 2004 17	Real Madrid	0–1	Sevilla	Madrid
21:00		Report	Baptista 19'	Stadium: Santiago Bernabéu; Attendance: 57,312; Referee: Miguel Ángel Pérez Lasa

5 January 2005 15	Real Madrid	2–1	Real Sociedad	Madrid
18:00	Ronaldo 41'; Zidane 90' (pen.)	Report	Nihat 72'	Stadium: Santiago Bernabéu; Attendance: 72,000; Referee: Vicente Lizondo Cortes
Note: The match, originally played at 12 December 2004, had to be abruptly stopped at the 87th minute due to a false bomb threat. It was agreed that the final six minutes, including four minutes of added time, was to be continued on January 5, 2005.

9 January 2005 18	Atlético Madrid	0–3	Real Madrid	Madrid
19:00		Report	Ronaldo 14', 83'; Solari 80'	Stadium: Vicente Calderón Stadium; Attendance: 35,000; Referee: Alfonso Pérez Burrull

16 January 2005 19	Real Madrid	3–1	Real Zaragoza	Madrid
21:00	Raúl 41'; Ronaldo 53'; Owen 84'	Report	Villa 10'	Stadium: Santiago Bernabéu; Attendance: 62,000; Referee: Jose Javier Losantos Omar

23 January 2005 20	Real Madrid	3–1	Mallorca	Madrid
21:00	Figo 35' (pen.); Samuel 80'; Solari 90'	Report	Campano 40'	Stadium: Santiago Bernabéu; Attendance: 63,000; Referee: Arturo Daudén Ibáñez

30 January 2005 21	Numancia	1–2	Real Madrid	Soria
19:00	Pérez 87'	Report	Beckham 62'; Salgado 82'	Stadium: Nuevo Estadio Los Pajaritos; Attendance: 10,000; Referee: Rafael Ramirez Dominiguez

5 February 2005 22	Real Madrid	4–0	Espanyol	Madrid
22:00	Zidane 13'; Raúl 30', 75'; Gravesen 83'	Report		Stadium: Santiago Bernabéu; Attendance: 70,000; Referee: Julián Rodríguez Santiago

13 February 2005 23	Osasuna	1–2	Real Madrid	Pamplona
19:00	Webó 35'	Report	Owen 76'; Helguera 79'	Stadium: El Sadar; Attendance: 15,000; Referee: Alfonso Pérez Burrull

19 February 2005 24	Real Madrid	0–2	Athletic Bilbao	Madrid
20:00		Report	Del Horno 57'; Iraola 73'	Stadium: Santiago Bernabéu; Attendance: 75,000; Referee: Xavier Moreno Delgado

26 February 2005 25	Deportivo La Coruña	2–0	Real Madrid	A Coruña
22:00	Luque 8'; Pavón 13' (o.g.)	Report		Stadium: ABANCA Riazor; Attendance: 18,000; Referee: Jose Javier Losantos Omar

2 March 2005 26	Real Madrid	3–1	Real Betis	Madrid
21:00	Owen 9'; Roberto Carlos 39'; Helguera 61'	Report	Edu 59'	Stadium: Santiago Bernabéu; Attendance: 70,000; Referee: Eduardo Iturralde González

5 March 2005 27	Valencia	1–1	Real Madrid	Valencia
20:00	Aimar 13'	Report	Ronaldo 28'	Stadium: Mestalla; Attendance: 45,000; Referee: Evaristo Puentes Leira

13 March 2005 28	Getafe	2–1	Real Madrid	Getafe
19:00	Albiol 37'; Riki 47'	Report	Solari 90'	Stadium: Coliseum; Attendance: 14,000; Referee: Vicente Lizondo Cortes

20 March 2005 29	Real Madrid	1–0	Málaga	Madrid
19:00	Roberto Carlos 61'	Report		Stadium: Santiago Bernabéu; Attendance: 61,000; Referee: Manuel Enrique Mejuto Gonzalez

3 April 2005 30	Albacete	1–2	Real Madrid	Albacete
21:00	Redondo 9'	Report	Helguera 15'; Owen 45'	Stadium: Carlos Belmonte; Attendance: 13,000; Referee: Alberto Undiano Mallenco

10 April 2005 31	Real Madrid	4–2	Barcelona	Madrid
19:00	Zidane 5'; Ronaldo 20'; Raúl 45'; Owen 65'	Report	Eto’o 28'; Ronaldinho 73'	Stadium: Santiago Bernabéu; Attendance: 80,000; Referee: Rafael Ramirez Dominguez

17 April 2005 32	Levante	0–2	Real Madrid	Valencia
19:00		Report	Ronaldo 36', 82'	Stadium: Ciutat de València; Attendance: 25,000; Referee: David Fernández Borbalán

23 April 2005 33	Real Madrid	2–1	Villarreal	Madrid
22:00	Ronaldo 69'; Salgado 76'	Report	Riquelme 40' (pen.)	Stadium: Santiago Bernabéu; Attendance: 80,000; Referee: Bernardino González Vázquez

30 April 2005 34	Real Sociedad	0–2	Real Madrid	San Sebastián
22:00		Report	Ronaldo 83', 90'	Stadium: Anoeta; Attendance: 22,000; Referee: Javier Turienzo Alvarez

7 May 2005 35	Real Madrid	5–0	Racing Santander	Madrid
20:00	Owen 28'; Ronaldo 36' (pen.), 90'; Raúl 53', 73'	Report		Stadium: Santiago Bernabéu; Attendance: 76,000; Referee: Eduardo Iturralde González

14 May 2005 36	Sevilla	2–2	Real Madrid	Seville
20:00	Ramos 20'; Baptista 90'	Report	Navarro 41' (o.g.); Zidane 73'	Stadium: Ramón Sánchez Pizjuán; Attendance: 42,000; Referee: Alfonso Pérez Burrull

21 May 2005 37	Real Madrid	0–0	Atlético Madrid	Madrid
22:00		Report		Stadium: Santiago Bernabéu; Attendance: 72,000; Referee: César Muñiz Fernández

28 May 2005 38	Real Zaragoza	1–3	Real Madrid	Zaragoza
21:00	Óscar 43'	Report	Owen 24'; Roberto Carlos 52'; Ronaldo 90'	Stadium: La Romareda; Attendance: 27,000; Referee: Miguel Angel Perez Lasa

=== Copa del Rey ===
==== Round of 64 ====
26 October 2004 Round of 64	Leganés	1–2	Real Madrid	Leganés, Community of Madrid
21:30	Daniel Ruiz 56'	Report	Morientes 19'; Owen 48'	Stadium: Estadio Municipal de Butarque; Attendance: 10,000; Referee: Bernardino González Vázquez

==== Round of 32 ====
10 November 2004 Round of 32	Tenerife	1–2 (a.e.t.)	Real Madrid	Santa Cruz de Tenerife, Canary Islands
22:30	Cristo 42'	Report	Solari 44', 120'	Stadium: Estadio Heliodoro Rodríguez López; Attendance: 18,300; Referee: Luis Medina Cantalejo

==== Round of 16 ====
13 January 2005 First leg	Real Valladolid	0–0	Real Madrid	Valladolid, Province of Valladolid
22:00		Report		Stadium: Estadio José Zorrilla; Attendance: 13,000; Referee: Alfonso Pino Zamorano

19 January 2005 Second leg	Real Madrid	1–1 (1–1 (a) agg.)	Real Valladolid	Madrid
21:30	Owen 48'	Report	Xavi Moré 77'	Stadium: Santiago Bernabéu; Attendance: 45,000; Referee: Eduardo Iturralde González

=== UEFA Champions League ===
==== Third qualifying round ====
11 August 2004 First leg	Wisła Kraków (Poland)	0–2	(Spain) Real Madrid	Kraków, Poland
20:45		Report	Morientes 72', 90'	Stadium: Stadion Miejski; Attendance: 10,000; Referee: Massimo Busacca (Switzerland)

25 August 2004 Second leg	Real Madrid (Spain)	3–1 (5–1 agg.)	(Poland) Wisła Kraków	Madrid, Spain
21:30	Ronaldo 3', 31'; Pavón 85'	Report	Gorawski 89'	Stadium: Estadio Santiago Bernabéu; Attendance: 70,000; Referee: Kim Milton Nielsen (Denmark)

==== Group stage ====
Pos	Team	Pld	W	D	L	GF	GA	GD	Pts	Qualification
1	(Germany) Bayer Leverkusen	6	3	2	1	13	7	+6	11	Advance to knockout stage
2	(Spain) Real Madrid	6	3	2	1	11	8	+3	11	Advance to knockout stage
3	(Ukraine) Dynamo Kyiv	6	3	1	2	11	8	+3	10	Transfer to UEFA Cup
4	(Italy) Roma	6	0	1	5	4	16	−12	1	

15 September 2004 1	Bayer Leverkusen (Germany)	3–0	(Spain) Real Madrid	Leverkusen, Germany
20:45	Krzynówek 40'; França 50'; Berbatov 55'	Report		Stadium: BayArena, Leverkusen; Attendance: 22,500; Referee: Graham Poll (England)

28 September 2004 2	Real Madrid (Spain)	4–2	(Italy) Roma	Madrid, Spain
20:45	Raúl 39', 72'; Figo 53' (pen.); Roberto Carlos 79'	Report	De Rossi 3'; Cassano 21'	Stadium: Santiago Bernabéu Stadium, Madrid; Attendance: 60,000; Referee: Valentin Ivanov (Russia)

19 October 2004 3	Real Madrid (Spain)	1–0	(Ukraine) Dynamo Kyiv	Madrid, Spain
20:45	Owen 35'	Report		Stadium: Santiago Bernabéu Stadium, Madrid; Attendance: 45,000; Referee: Gilles Veissière (France)

3 November 2004 4	Dynamo Kyiv (Ukraine)	2–2	(Spain) Real Madrid	Kyiv, Ukraine
20:45	Yussuf 13'; Verpakovskis 23'	Report	Raúl 38'; Figo 44' (pen.)	Stadium: Lobanovsky Dynamo Stadium, Kyiv; Attendance: 78,000; Referee: Kyros Vassaras (Greece)

23 November 2004 5	Real Madrid (Spain)	1–1	(Germany) Bayer Leverkusen	Madrid, Spain
20:45	Raúl 70'	Report	Berbatov 36'	Stadium: Santiago Bernabéu Stadium, Madrid; Attendance: 65,000; Referee: Alain Hamer (Luxembourg)

8 December 2004 6	Roma (Italy)	0–3	(Spain) Real Madrid	Rome, Italy
20:45		Report	Ronaldo 9'; Figo 60' (pen.), 82'	Stadium: Stadio Olimpico, Rome; Referee: René Temmink (Netherlands

==== Round of 16 ====
22 February 2005	Real Madrid (Spain)	1–0	(Italy) Juventus	Madrid
	Helguera 31'	Report		Stadium: Santiago Bernabéu Stadium; Attendance: 75,000; Referee: Ľuboš Micheľ

9 March 2005	Juventus (Italy)	2–0 (a.e.t.)	(Spain) Real Madrid	Turin
	Trezeguet 75'; Zalayeta 116'	Report		Stadium: Stadio delle Alpi; Attendance: 68,850; Referee: Markus Merk

== Statistics ==
=== Players statistics ===
No.	Pos	Nat	Player	Total		La Liga		Copa del Rey		Champions League	
No.	Pos	Nat	Player	Apps	Goals	Apps	Goals	Apps	Goals	Apps	Goals
1	GK	(Spain) ESP	Casillas	47	-41	37	-30	0	0	10	-11
2	DF	(Spain) ESP	Salgado	40	2	30	2	1	0	9	0
6	DF	(Spain) ESP	Helguera	45	4	33+1	3	1	0	10	1
19	DF	(Argentina) ARG	Samuel	40	2	30	2	2	0	8	0
3	DF	(Brazil) BRA	Roberto Carlos	46	4	33+1	3	1+1	0	10	1
23	DM	(England) ENG	Beckham	38	4	29+1	4	0	0	8	0
16	DM	(Denmark) DEN	Gravesen	20	1	14+3	1	1	0	2	0
10	AM	(Portugal) POR	Figo	43	7	26+7	3	0	0	10	4
5	AM	(France) FRA	Zidane	40	6	28+1	6	0+1	0	10	0
7	FW	(Spain) ESP	Raúl	43	13	31+1	9	0+1	0	10	4
9	FW	(Brazil) BRA	Ronaldo	45	24	32+2	21	0+1	0	10	3
13	GK	(Spain) ESP	César Sánchez	6	-5	1+1	-2	4	-3	0	-0
11	FW	(England) ENG	Owen	45	16	20+16	13	4	2	2+3	1
14	MF	(Spain) ESP	Guti	39	0	18+13	0	0	0	4+4	0
22	DF	(Spain) ESP	Pavon	27	1	14+3	0	3	0	5+2	1
15	DF	(Spain) ESP	Bravo	21	0	13+1	0	4	0	1+2	0
21	MF	(Argentina) ARG	Solari	34	5	11+16	3	2	2	0+5	0
20	MF	(Spain) ESP	Celades	32	0	9+13	0	4	0	1+5	0
4	MF	(Spain) ESP	Borja	10	0	2+6	0	2	0		
24	DF	(Spain) ESP	Mejía	8	0	2+3	0	3	0		
35	DF	(Spain) ESP	Javi García	7	0	1+2	0	4	0		
27	DF	(Spain) ESP	Arbeloa	4	0	1+1	0	2	0		
32	MF	(Spain) ESP	Juanfran	3	0	1	0	0+2	0		
8	FW	(Spain) ESP	Morientes	21	1	0+13	0	2	1	0+6	0
28	DF	(Spain) ESP	Palencia	2	0	0+2	0				
43	MF	(Spain) ESP	Jotha	1	0	0+1	0				
31	MF	(Spain) ESP	De la Red	1	0	0	0	0+1	0		
17	FW	(Spain) ESP	Portillo	1	0	0	0	1	0		
33	MF	(Spain) ESP	Jurado	2	0	0	0	1+1	0		
38	MF	(Spain) ESP	Soldado	2	0	0	0	1+1	0		
42	MF	(Spain) ESP	Paredes	1	0	0	0	0+1	0		
43	MF	(Spain) ESP	Alex Pérez	1	0	0	0	1	0		
18	DF	(England) ENG	Woodgate	0	0	0	0				
25	GK	(Spain) ESP	López	0	0	0	0	0	0		

- Source: https://www.bdfutbol.com/en/t/t2004-052.html
