= Francisco Pavón =

Spanish association football player

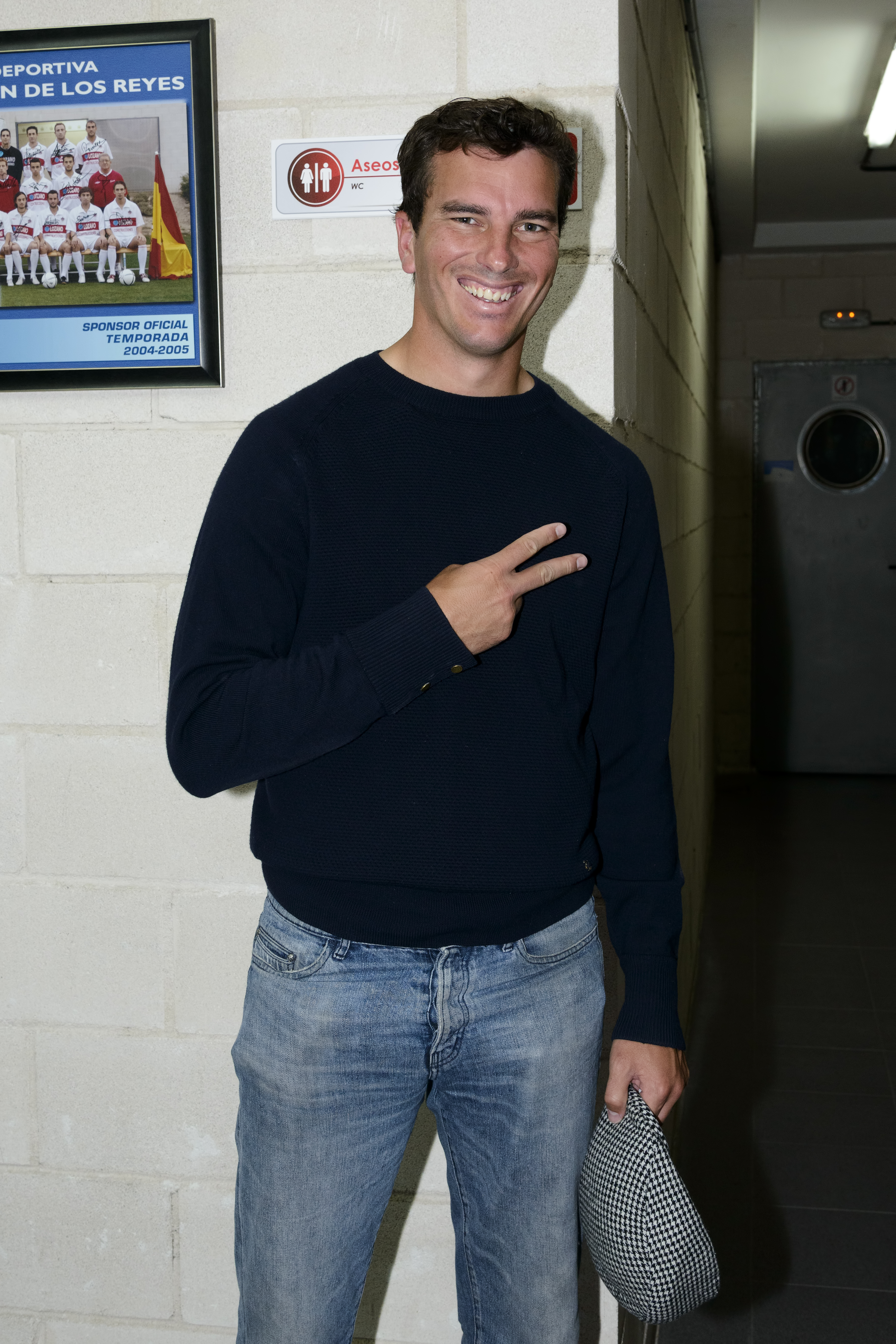
- Pavón in 2014

Personal information
- Full name: Francisco Pavón Barahona
- Date of birth: 9 January 1980 (age 46)
- Place of birth: Madrid, Spain
- Height: 1.88 m (6 ft 2 in)
- Position: Centre-back

Youth career
- Real Madrid

Senior career*
Years	Team	Apps	(Gls)
1998–2000	Real Madrid C	25	(1)
2000–2001	Real Madrid B	38	(1)
2001–2007	Real Madrid	106	(1)
2007–2010	Zaragoza	43	(5)
2010–2011	Arles-Avignon	26	(0)
Total		238	(8)
- * Club domestic league appearances and goals

Francisco Pavón Barahona (born 9 January 1980) is a Spanish former professional footballer who played as a centre-back.

His name became associated with the Los Galácticos policy when Real Madrid – where he spent most of his 13-year career – president Florentino Pérez promised to build a team full of Zidanes and Pavones – expensive high-profile recruits like Zinedine Zidane and youth team graduates like Pavón.

Over nine seasons, Pavón amassed La Liga totals of 125 matches and three goals, with his main club and Zaragoza.

== Club career ==
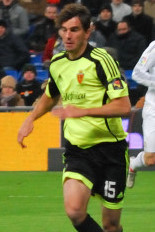
Pavón playing for Zaragoza in 2009

Born in Madrid, Pavón progressed through the ranks at Real Madrid, starting with the junior team Tendillo until he established himself with the reserves. He made his La Liga debut against Athletic Bilbao at the Santiago Bernabéu Stadium on 6 October 2001 and, shortly after that 2–0 win, signed a seven-year professional contract. He went on to make a further 27 league appearances during the season, adding that campaign's UEFA Champions League.

Pavón totalled 51 league matches in the next two years, scoring a rare goal on 8 May 2004 in a 2–3 home loss to Mallorca. His role would diminish drastically onwards, as he made no league appearances during 2006–07.

On 25 April 2007, media speculation indicated that Pavón was close to agreeing a four-year deal with Premier League club Bolton Wanderers, rejoining former teammate Iván Campo, but nothing came of it. He eventually put pen to paper a four-year contract with Real Zaragoza in July after his release from Real Madrid, but took part in just eight league games through the season as the Aragonese were relegated.

In 2008–09's Segunda División, Pavón scored his first goal for Zaragoza, in a 2–1 home victory over Real Murcia who had also been relegated the previous campaign. He contributed much more consistently as they were immediately promoted.

Pavón was only third or fourth-choice centre-back in the 2009–10 season, but still managed to score twice as Zaragoza retained their status in the division. He signed for Arles-Avignon on the last day of the 2010 summer transfer window, reuniting with former Real Madrid teammate Álvaro Mejía.

In November 2011, Pavón went on trial with West Ham United of the Football League Championship, but failed to convince manager Sam Allardyce of his fitness. After nearly two years without a club – during which he refused to claim unemployment benefits, saying "others need it more"– he chose to retire, aged 33.

== Career statistics ==
Appearances and goals by club, season and competition
Club	Season	League			Cup (Note: Includes Copa del Rey, Coupe de France, Coupe de la Ligue)		Europe		Other		Total	
Club	Season	Division	Apps	Goals	Apps	Goals	Apps	Goals	Apps	Goals	Apps	Goals
Real Madrid B	2000–01	Segunda División B	38	1	—		—		—		38	1
Real Madrid	2000–01	La Liga	0	0	0	0	1 (Note: Appearances in UEFA Champions League)	0	0	0	1	0
Real Madrid	2001–02	La Liga	28	0	7	1	10	0	0	0	45	1
Real Madrid	2002–03	La Liga	22	0	6	0	9	0	2 (Note: One appearance in UEFA Super Cup, one appearance in Intercontinental Cup)	0	39	0
Real Madrid	2003–04	La Liga	29	1	3	0	6	0	1 (Note: Appearance in Supercopa de España)	0	39	1
Real Madrid	2004–05	La Liga	17	0	3	0	7	1	—		27	1
Real Madrid	2005–06	La Liga	10	0	1	0	3	0	—		14	0
Real Madrid	2006–07	La Liga	0	0	2	0	0	0	—		2	0
Real Madrid	Total		106	1	22	1	36	1	3	0	167	3
Zaragoza	2007–08	La Liga	8	0	1	0	1 (Note: Appearance in UEFA Cup)	0	—		10	0
Zaragoza	2008–09	Segunda División	24	3	1	0	—		—		25	3
Zaragoza	2009–10	La Liga	11	2	—		—		—		11	2
Zaragoza	Total		43	5	2	0	1	0	0	0	46	5
Arles-Avignon	2010–11	Ligue 1	26	0	2	0	—		—		28	0
Career Total			213	7	26	1	37	1	3	0	279	9

== Honours ==
Real Madrid

- La Liga: 2002–03, 2006–07
- Supercopa de España: 2001, 2003
- UEFA Champions League: 2001–02
- Intercontinental Cup: 2002
- UEFA Super Cup: 2002
