= 2005–06 Copa del Rey =

104th Copa del Rey

Tournament details
- Country: Spain
- Teams: 82

Final positions
- Champions: Espanyol (4th title)
- Runners-up: Zaragoza

Tournament statistics
- Top goal scorer(s): Ewerthon (8 goals)

The 2005–06 Copa del Rey was the 104th staging of the Copa del Rey.

== Preliminary round ==
Team 1	Agg.	Team 2	1st leg	2nd leg
Las Rozas	1–3	RSD Alcalá	0–2	1–1
Tenisca	2–1	Ourense	0–0	2–1
Rápido de Bouzas	1–2	Rayo Vallecano	1–0	0–2
Universidad de Las Palmas CF	0–1	Las Palmas	0–0	0–1
Promesas Ponferrada		Burgos		
Escobedo	0–4	Oviedo	0–2	0–2
Portugalete	(a) 2–2	Ponferradina	0–1	2–1
Barakaldo	1–2	Lemona	1–1	0–1
Gandía	1–5	Villajoyosa	1–1	0–4
Barbastro	1–6	Alcoyano	1–3	0–3
Valle de Egüés	2–5	Logroñés	1–2	1–3
Constancia	1–9	Alicante	0–5	1–4
Calahorra	1–6	L'Hospitalet	1–3	0–3
Almansa	2–1	Villanueva	1–0	1–1
Mérida	2–0	Conquense	2–0	0–0
Ceuta	1–1 (10–9 p.)	Algeciras	1–0	0–1
Baza	3–2	Marbella	0–0	3–2
Águilas	4–2	Leganés	2–0	2–2

Bye: Real Unión and Zamora.

== First round ==
31 August 2005
Real Murcia	1–0	Tenerife
Lorca Deportiva	1–2	Ciudad de Murcia
Recreativo	3–2	Elche
Racing Ferrol	2–0	Sporting Gijón
Castellón	0–2	Lleida
Hércules	0–1	Gimnàstic
Albacete	2–1	Polideportivo Ejido
Almería	0–0	Numancia	Penalties: 1–3
Xerez	1–1	Valladolid	Penalties: 4–2
Levante	0–1	Eibar

== Second round ==
14/15 September 2005
Baza	2–1	Ciudad de Murcia
Córdoba	0–3	Gimnàstic
Portugalete	0–1	Real Unión
Burgos	3–1	Salamanca
Águilas	1–1	Numancia	Penalties: 4–5
Ceuta	0–1	Eibar
Lemona	0–2	Lleida
Alcoyano	3–0	Racing Ferrol
Alicante	2–0	Recreativo
Rayo Vallecano	1–0	Oviedo
Zamora	1–0	Villajoyosa
L'Hospitalet	2–0	Pontevedra
Alcalá	2–4	Xerez
Mérida	2–3	Albacete
Tenisca	0–0	Real Murcia	Penalties: 3–2
Terrassa	2–3	Logroñés
Almansa	1–2	Las Palmas

== Third round ==
19/20 October 2005
Eibar	1–0	Alavés
Xerez	3–2	Numancia
Rayo Vallecano	1–2	Getafe
Real Unión	0–1	Athletic Bilbao
Burgos	1–0	Racing Santander
Tenisca	1–3	Celta Vigo
Las Palmas	0–1	Atlético Madrid
Zamora	1–1	Real Sociedad	Penalties: 2–0
Alicante	1–1	Zaragoza	Penalties: 5–6
Alcoyano	4–1	Mallorca
Logroñés	0–1	Lleida
L'Hospitalet	4–3	Gimnàstic
Baza	1–1	Málaga	Penalties: 4–3
Albacete	1–3	Cádiz

== Fourth round ==
9/30 November 2005
Baza	0–1	Celta Vigo
Lleida	2–4	Getafe
L'Hospitalet	1–3	Athletic Bilbao
Burgos	0–2	Cádiz
Zamora	1–1	Eibar	Penalties: 4–3
Xerez	2–2	Zaragoza	Penalties: 6–7
Alcoyano	0–1	Atlético Madrid

== Round of 16 ==
Team 1	Agg.	Team 2	1st leg	2nd leg
Athletic Bilbao	0–5	Real Madrid	0–1	0–4
Villarreal	0–3	Valencia	0–2	0–1
Celta Vigo	1–1 (a)	Betis	1–1	0–0
Getafe	3–4	Espanyol	0–1	3–3
Deportivo	4–2	Osasuna	3–0	1–2
Cádiz	3–2	Sevilla	3–2	0–0
Zamora	1–9	Barcelona	1–3	0–6
Atlético Madrid	2–3	Zaragoza	0–1	2–2

== Quarter-finals ==
Team 1	Agg.	Team 2	1st leg	2nd leg
Zaragoza	5–4	Barcelona	4–2	1–2
Betis	0–2	Real Madrid	0–1	0–1
Cádiz	0–4	Espanyol	0–2	0–2
Deportivo	2–1	Valencia	1–0	1–1

=== First leg ===
18 January 2006	Cádiz	0–2	Espanyol	Cádiz
20:00 CET		Report (in Spanish)	Pandiani 50'; Fredson 88'	Stadium: Estadio Ramón de Carranza; Attendance: 13,000; Referee: Manuel Mejuto González (Asturias)

18 January 2006	Betis	0–1	Real Madrid	Seville
21:30 CET		Report (in Spanish)	Cassano 65'	Stadium: Estadio Manuel Ruiz de Lopera; Attendance: 50,000; Referee: Bernardino González Vázquez (Galicia (Spain))

19 January 2006	Deportivo	1–0	Valencia	A Coruña
22:00 CET	Sergio 78' (pen.)	Report (in Spanish)		Stadium: Riazor; Attendance: 20,000; Referee: Eduardo Iturralde González (Basque Country (autonomous community))

26 January 2006	Zaragoza	4–2	Barcelona	Zaragoza
21:00 CET	Milito 23', 93' (pen.); Ewerthon 25', 27'	Report (in Spanish)	Larsson 37'; Ronaldinho 61' (pen.)	Stadium: La Romareda, Zaragoza; Attendance: 34,700; Referee: Luis Medina Cantalejo (Andalusia)

=== Second leg ===
25 January 2006	Espanyol	2–0	Cádiz	Barcelona
20:00 CET	Jofre 72', 76' (pen.)	Report (in Spanish)		Stadium: Montjuïc; Attendance: 9,500; Referee: Víctor Esquinas Torres (Community of Madrid)

25 January 2006	Real Madrid	1–0	Betis	Madrid
20:00 CET	Robinho 43'	Report (in Spanish)		Stadium: Santiago Bernabéu Stadium; Attendance: 62,000; Referee: Miguel Ángel Pérez Lasa (Basque Country (autonomous community))

25 January / 1 February 2006	Valencia	1–1	Deportivo	Valencia
22:00 CET; 22:00 CET	Villa 43'	Report (in Spanish); Report (in Spanish)	Víctor 69' (pen.)	Stadium: Mestalla; Attendance: 32,000 / 0 Referee: Megía Dávila (Community of Madrid)

1 February 2006	Barcelona	2–1	Zaragoza	Barcelona
22:00 CET	Messi 42'; Larsson 90'	Report (in Spanish)	Óscar 65'	Stadium: Camp Nou; Attendance: 56,511; Referee: Rodríguez Santiago (Castile and León)

== Semi-finals ==
Team 1	Agg.	Team 2	1st leg	2nd leg
Zaragoza	6–5	Real Madrid	6–1	0–4
Espanyol	2–1	Deportivo	2–1	0–0

=== First leg ===
8 February 2006	Zaragoza	6–1	Real Madrid	Zaragoza
21:00 CET	Milito 14', 21', 34', 56'; Ewerthon 59', 82'	Report (in Spanish)	Baptista 37'	Stadium: La Romareda; Attendance: 32,000; Referee: Alfonso Pérez Burrull (Cantabria)

9 February 2006	Espanyol	2–1	Deportivo	Barcelona
21:00 CET	García 56' (pen.); Pandiani 89'	Report (in Spanish)	Castro 4' (pen.)	Stadium: Montjuïc; Attendance: 16,250; Referee: Luis Medina Cantalejo (Andalusia)

=== Second leg ===
14 February 2006	Real Madrid	4–0	Zaragoza	Madrid
21:00 CET	Cicinho 1'; Robinho 5'; Ronaldo 10'; Roberto Carlos 60'	Report (in Spanish)		Stadium: Santiago Bernabéu; Attendance: 75,000; Referee: Bernardino González Vázquez (Galicia (Spain))

15 March 2006	Deportivo	0–0	Espanyol	A Coruña
21:00 CET		Report (in Spanish)		Stadium: Riazor; Attendance: 28,000; Referee: Alberto Undiano Mallenco (Navarre)

== Final ==
12 April 2006
21:30 CEST

Espanyol	4–1	Real Zaragoza
Tamudo 2'; L. García 33', 86'; Coro 71'	Report	Ewerthon 28'

Santiago Bernabéu, Madrid
Attendance: 78,000
Referee: Medina Cantalejo (Andalusia)

== Top goalscorers ==
Rank	Player	Club	Goals
1	(Brazil) Ewerthon	Real Zaragoza	8
2	(Argentina) Diego Milito	Real Zaragoza	6
3	(Brazil) Robinho	Real Madrid	4
3	(Spain) Jesús Perera	Celta Vigo	4
3	(Sweden) Henrik Larsson	Barcelona	4
6	(Serbia and Montenegro) Veljko Paunović	Getafe	3
6	(Spain) Luis García	Espanyol	3
8	14 players		2
