= 2001 Supercopa de España =

Zaragoza	Real Madrid
1	4
- on aggregate

First leg
Zaragoza	Real Madrid
1	1
- Date: 19 August 2001
- Venue: La Romareda, Zaragoza
- Referee: Antonio López Nieto
- Attendance: 26,800

Second leg
Real Madrid	Zaragoza
3	0
- Date: 22 August 2001
- Venue: Santiago Bernabéu, Madrid
- Referee: Eduardo Iturralde González
- Attendance: 70,000

The 2001 Supercopa de España was two-leg Spanish football matches played on 19 August and 22 August 2001. It was contested by Zaragoza, who were Copa del Rey winners in 2000–01, and Real Madrid, who won the 2000–01 La Liga title. Real Madrid won the Supercopa de España 4–1 on aggregate.

== Match details ==
=== First leg ===
19 August 2001
21:45 CET

Zaragoza	1–1	Real Madrid
Yordi 79'		Conceição 54'

La Romareda, Zaragoza
Attendance: 26,800
Referee: López Nieto

Real Zaragoza	Real Madrid

GK	13	(Spain) César Láinez
RB	16	(Spain) Pablo Díaz	(substituted off) 73'
CB	6	(Spain) Xavi Aguado (c)
CB	23	(Spain) Paco Jémez
LB	25	(Brazil) Esquerdinha
RM	7	(Spain) Juanele
CM	14	(Spain) José Ignacio
CM	20	(Paraguay) Roberto Acuña
LM	11	(Spain) Martín Vellisca	(substituted off) 73'
CF	3	(Brazil) Paulo Jamelli
CF	9	(Spain) Yordi
Substitutes:
DF	4	(Spain) Luis Cuartero	(substituted on) 73'
FW	24	(Argentina) Luciano Galletti	(substituted on) 73'
Manager:
(Spain) Txetxu Rojo

GK	13	(Spain) César Sánchez
RB	2	(Spain) Míchel Salgado
CB	18	(Spain) Aitor Karanka
CB	4	(Spain) Fernando Hierro (c)
LB	3	(Brazil) Roberto Carlos
DM	24	(France) Claude Makélélé
DM	16	(Brazil) Flávio Conceição
RM	10	(Portugal) Luís Figo	(substituted off) 88'
AM	5	(France) Zinedine Zidane	(substituted off) 80'
LM	21	(Argentina) Santiago Solari	(substituted off) 70'
CF	7	(Spain) Raúl
Substitutes:
MF	8	(England) Steve McManaman	(substituted on) 70'
FW	9	(Spain) Fernando Morientes	(substituted on) 80'
MF	20	(Spain) Albert Celades	(substituted on) 88'
Manager:
(Spain) Vicente del Bosque

=== Second leg ===
22 August 2001
21:45 CET

Real Madrid	3–0	Zaragoza
Raúl 74', 81', 89'

Santiago Bernabéu, Madrid
Attendance: 70,000
Referee: Iturralde González

Real Madrid	Real Zaragoza

GK	1	(Spain) Iker Casillas
RB	2	(Spain) Míchel Salgado
CB	18	(Spain) Aitor Karanka
CB	4	(Spain) Fernando Hierro (c)
LB	3	(Brazil) Roberto Carlos		(substituted off) 85'
DM	24	(France) Claude Makélélé
DM	16	(Brazil) Flávio Conceição
AM	10	(Portugal) Luís Figo
AM	5	(France) Zinedine Zidane		(substituted off) 71'
CF	9	(Spain) Fernando Morientes	(yellow card) 29'	(substituted off) 67'
CF	7	(Spain) Raúl
Substitutes:
MF	14	(Spain) Guti		(substituted on) 67'
MF	11	(Brazil) Sávio		(substituted on) 71'
MF	21	(Argentina) Santiago Solari		(substituted on) 85'
Manager:
(Spain) Vicente del Bosque

GK	13	(Spain) César Láinez
RB	22	(Sweden) Gary Sundgren	(yellow card) 17'
CB	6	(Spain) Xavi Aguado (c)
CB	23	(Spain) Paco Jémez
LB	25	(Brazil) Esquerdinha
DM	14	(Spain) José Ignacio	(yellow card) 66'
DM	20	(Paraguay) Roberto Acuña
RM	24	(Argentina) Luciano Galletti	(yellow card) 43'	(substituted off) 59'
AM	8	(Spain) Santiago Aragón		(substituted off) 74'
LM	11	(Spain) Martín Vellisca		(substituted off) 81'
CF	3	(Brazil) Paulo Jamelli
Substitutes:
DF	4	(Spain) Luis Cuartero		(substituted on) 59'
FW	9	(Spain) Yordi		(substituted on) 74'
FW	7	(Spain) Juanele		(substituted on) 81'
Manager:
(Spain) Txetxu Rojo

== See also ==
- 2001–02 La Liga
- 2001–02 Copa del Rey
- 2001–02 Real Madrid CF season
