= César Sánchez =

Spanish footballer

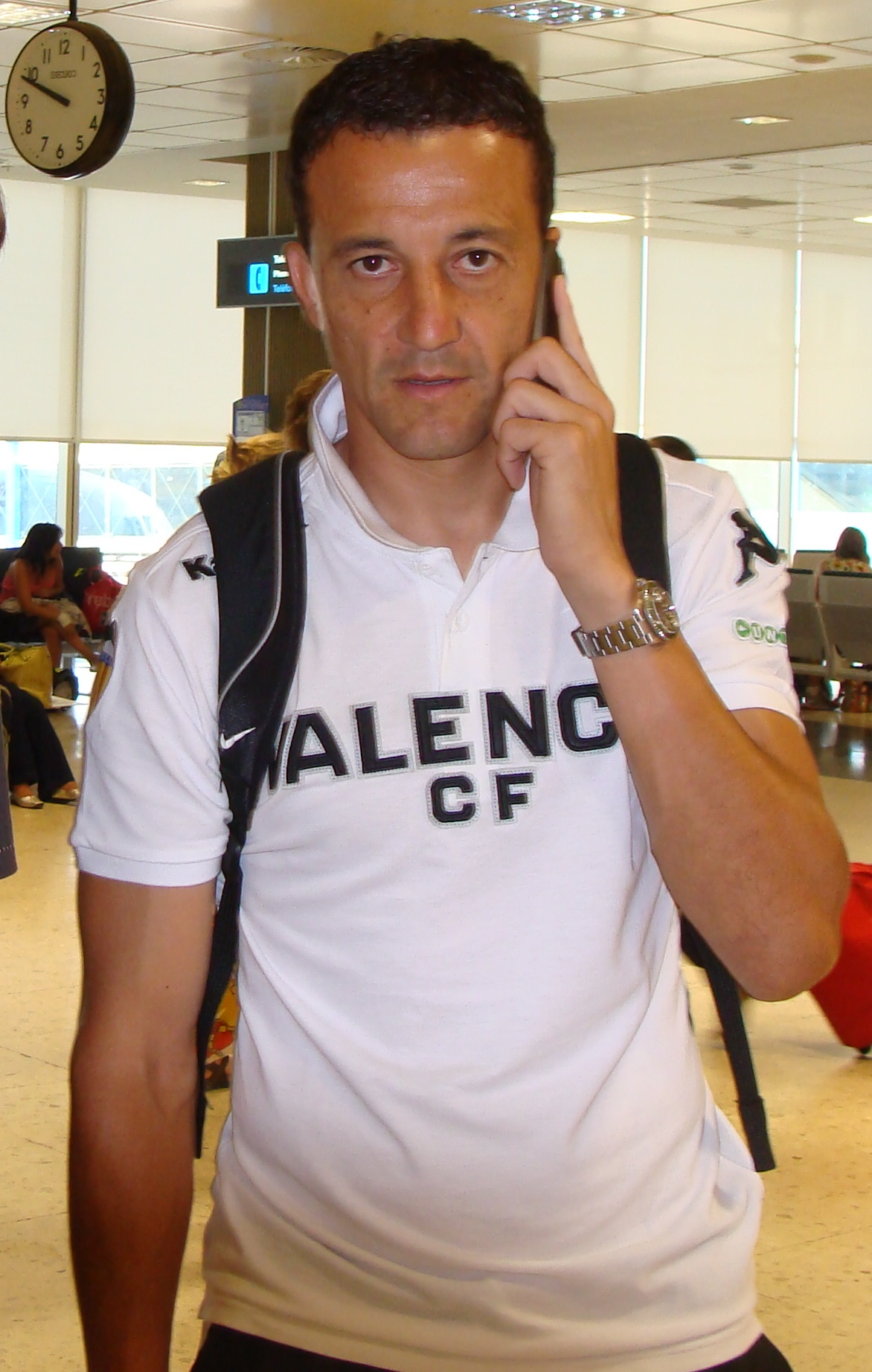
- César in 2010

Personal information
- Full name: César Sánchez Domínguez
- Date of birth: 2 September 1971 (age 55)
- Place of birth: Coria, Spain
- Height: 1.85 m (6 ft 1 in)
- Position: Goalkeeper

Youth career
- Plasencia
- Valladolid

Senior career*
Years	Team	Apps	(Gls)
1991–1992	Valladolid B	17	(0)
1992–2000	Valladolid	206	(0)
2000–2005	Real Madrid	20	(0)
2005–2008	Zaragoza	110	(0)
2008–2009	Tottenham Hotspur	0	(0)
2009–2011	Valencia	63	(0)
2011–2012	Villarreal	2	(0)
Total		418	(0)

International career
2000	Spain	1	(0)
- * Club domestic league appearances and goals

César Sánchez Domínguez (Spanish pronunciation: [ˈθesaɾ ˈsantʃeθ]; born 2 September 1971), sometimes known as simply César, is a Spanish former professional footballer who played as a goalkeeper.

He played 401 La Liga games in 20 seasons, with Valladolid, Real Madrid, Zaragoza, Valencia and Villarreal, being first choice in three of those clubs and winning six major titles with the second, including the 2002 Champions League. He also appeared once for Spain.

From January to June 2020, César was sporting director at Valencia.

== Club career ==
=== Valladolid and Real Madrid ===
César was born in Coria, Cáceres, Extremadura. He graduated from Real Valladolid's youth academy, and made his debut with the first team in a 0–6 home defeat against FC Barcelona where he came on for Mauro Ravnić early into the second half, at the end of the 1991–92 season. He only missed a total of four league games between 1995 and 2000.

Sánchez signed ahead of 2000–01 for La Liga giants Real Madrid, initially backing up wonderkid Iker Casillas. However, the following campaign, he eventually became first-choice and started five out of nine UEFA Champions League matches during the capital side's victorious run, but was substituted by Casillas in the final with Bayer 04 Leverkusen after suffering an injury.

=== Zaragoza and Tottenham ===
César joined Real Zaragoza for 2005–06, and was everpresent in the Aragonese side's lineups during three seasons. In August 2008, after their relegation to Segunda División, new manager Marcelino García Toral sent the player to the reserves.

Shortly after, Sánchez was bought by Juande Ramos's Tottenham Hotspur. He made his only appearance for the London club in a 4–2 victory over Liverpool in the fourth round of the Football League Cup, replacing the injured Heurelho Gomes.

=== Valencia ===
César returned to Spain on 20 January 2009, joining Valencia CF on a free transfer until the end of the season as the Che had just lost first-choice Renan to a groin injury, during a 3–2 loss at Athletic Bilbao. Despite this, the former was still named on the bench for a Tottenham game on the 21st, the League Cup semi-final second leg against Burnley; two days later, Tottenham announced that his contract had been cancelled by mutual consent, and he retained his starting status even when the Brazilian recovered from his injury.

After an impressive half-season, César renewed his contract for another year. He started the 2009–10 campaign on the bench, playing second-fiddle to new signing Miguel Ángel Moyá; however, after unconvincing displays by the latter, he regained the starting spot, keeping consecutive clean sheets against Racing de Santander (1–0), defending champions Barcelona (0–0), UD Almería (3–0) and Málaga CF (1–0). In May 2010, after helping Valencia to third place, with the team consequently returning to the Champions League, the veteran agreed to a further one-year extension.

On 2 April 2011, César became the second oldest goalkeeper in Spanish League history as he appeared – as a starter – in a 4–2 defeat of Getafe CF, aged 39 years and 212 days. He contributed 15 appearances, as his team finished third and qualified for the Champions League.

=== Later career ===
However, after the club acquired Diego Alves and renewed youth graduate Vicente Guaita's contract, César became surplus to requirements. On 2 June 2011, he signed a one-year deal with Valencian Community neighbours Villarreal CF, making his league debut on 10 September in a 2–2 home draw against Sevilla FC: after replacing sent off Diego López early into the first half, he stopped the ensuing penalty by Álvaro Negredo, whom however managed to score with a putback. Subsequently, he became only the fifth player to appear in a Spanish top division match over the age of 40, following Harry Lowe, Jacques Songo'o, Amedeo Carboni and Donato.

César returned to the Mestalla Stadium on 20 January 2020, being appointed sporting director on a two-and-a-half-year contract. However, five months later, he resigned from the post.

== International career ==
César earned his only cap for Spain on 16 August 2000, in a 4–1 friendly defeat to Germany in Hannover.

== Career statistics ==
Appearances and goals by club, season and competition
Club	Season	League			Cup		Europe		Other		Total	
Club	Season	Division	Apps	Goals	Apps	Goals	Apps	Goals	Apps	Goals	Apps	Goals
Valladolid B	1991–92	Segunda División B	17	0	—		—		—		17	0
Valladolid	1990–91	La Liga	0	0	0	0	—		—		0	0
Valladolid	1991–92	La Liga	1	0	0	0	—		—		1	0
Valladolid	1992–93	Segunda División	0	0	7	0	—		—		7	0
Valladolid	1993–94	La Liga	3	0	5	0	—		—		8	0
Valladolid	1994–95	La Liga	10	0	0	0	—		—		10	0
Valladolid	1995–96	La Liga	40	0	4	0	—		—		44	0
Valladolid	1996–97	La Liga	40	0	2	0	—		—		42	0
Valladolid	1997–98	La Liga	38	0	2	0	4	0	—		44	0
Valladolid	1998–99	La Liga	38	0	6	0	—		—		44	0
Valladolid	1999–2000	La Liga	36	0	0	0	—		—		36	0
Valladolid	Total		206	0	26	0	4	0	—		236	0
Real Madrid	2000–01	La Liga	5	0	1	0	5	0	0	0	11	0
Real Madrid	2001–02	La Liga	12	0	4	0	9	0	1	0	26	0
Real Madrid	2002–03	La Liga	0	0	6	0	1	0	—		7	0
Real Madrid	2003–04	La Liga	1	0	7	0	1	0	—		9	0
Real Madrid	2004–05	La Liga	2	0	4	0	0	0	—		6	0
Real Madrid	Total		20	0	22	0	16	0	1	0	59	0
Zaragoza	2005–06	La Liga	35	0	8	0	—		—		43	0
Zaragoza	2006–07	La Liga	38	0	4	0	—		—		42	0
Zaragoza	2007–08	La Liga	37	0	1	0	1	0	—		39	0
Zaragoza	Total		110	0	13	0	1	0	—		124	0
Tottenham Hotspur	2008–09	Premier League	0	0	0	0	0	0	1	0	1	0
Valencia	2008–09	La Liga	18	0	1	0	2	0	—		21	0
Valencia	2009–10	La Liga	30	0	0	0	8	0	—		38	0
Valencia	2010–11	La LIga	15	0	0	0	4	0	—		19	0
Valencia	Total		63	0	1	0	14	0	—		78	0
Villarreal	2011–12	La Liga	2	0	2	0	0	0	—		4	0
Career total			418	0	64	0	35	0	2	0	519	0

== Honours ==
Real Madrid

- La Liga: 2000–01
- Supercopa de España: 2001, 2003
- UEFA Champions League: 2001–02
- Intercontinental Cup: 2002
- UEFA Super Cup: 2002

== See also ==
- List of La Liga players (400+ appearances)
- List of Real Zaragoza players (+100)
- List of footballers with 400 or more La Liga appearances
