= Óscar Miñambres =

Spanish footballer

Personal information
- Full name: Óscar Miñambres Pascual
- Date of birth: 1 January 1981 (age 45)
- Place of birth: Fuenlabrada, Spain
- Height: 1.75 m (5 ft 9 in)
- Positions: Right-back; midfielder

Youth career
- 1994–1999: Real Madrid

Senior career*
Years	Team	Apps	(Gls)
1999–2000	Real Madrid C		
2000–2002	Real Madrid B	62	(5)
2000–2007	Real Madrid	18	(0)
2004–2005	→ Espanyol (loan)	5	(0)
2007	Hércules	0	(0)
Total		85	(5)

International career
2002–2003	Spain U21	11	(0)
- * Club domestic league appearances and goals

Óscar Miñambres Pascual (born 1 January 1981) is a Spanish former professional footballer.

He could operate as either a defender or midfielder on the right side, and had his career marred by constant injuries. He appeared in 37 competitive games for Real Madrid.

== Club career ==
=== Real Madrid ===
A product of Real Madrid's youth academy, Miñambres was born in Fuenlabrada, Community of Madrid, and first appeared with the first team on 13 December 2000, as a 66th-minute substitute for Albert Celades in a 2–1 away loss to CD Toledo in the round of 64 of the Copa del Rey; his La Liga bow took place on 10 February 2002, when he played 90 minutes in a 7–0 home thrashing of UD Las Palmas for his sole appearance of the season. He would also make his UEFA Champions League debut that year, appearing against FC Porto and setting up a goal for Santiago Solari in the 2–1 second group phase away win.

After years battling injuries and a loan at fellow top-division side RCD Espanyol in the 2004–05 campaign, Miñambres became a free agent after Real Madrid did not offer him a new deal.

=== Hércules ===
On 8 August 2007, newspaper Marca officially announced that Miñambres would play the next three years with Segunda División club Hércules CF. The following day, however, he terminated his contract because his knee was not fully recovered, and he immediately retired from football.

== Honours ==
Real Madrid

- La Liga: 2002–03
- UEFA Champions League: 2001–02
- Intercontinental Cup: 2002
