= Albert Celades =

Spanish footballer and manager (born 1975)

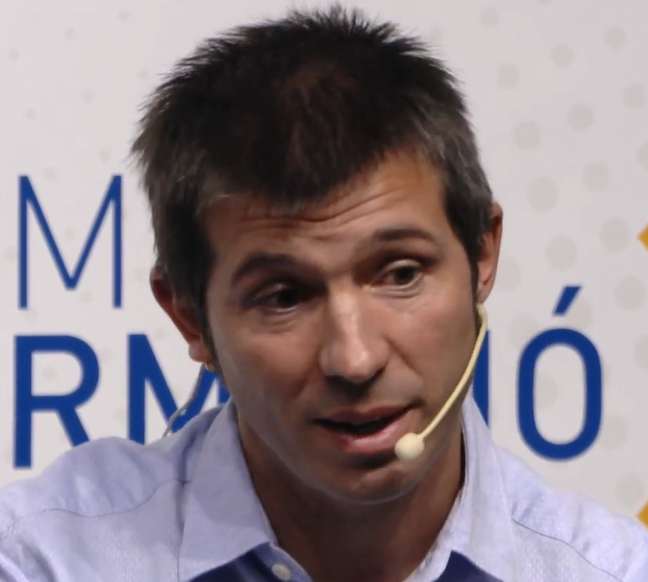
- Celades in 2019

Personal information
- Full name: Albert Celades López
- Date of birth: 29 September 1975 (age 51)
- Place of birth: Barcelona, Spain
- Height: 1.77 m (5 ft 10 in)
- Position: Defensive midfielder

Youth career
- 1990–1994: Barcelona

Senior career*
Years	Team	Apps	(Gls)
1994–1995	Barcelona B	14	(3)
1995–1999	Barcelona	72	(4)
1999–2000	Celta	24	(1)
2000–2005	Real Madrid	56	(1)
2003–2004	→ Bordeaux (loan)	27	(3)
2005–2008	Zaragoza	71	(2)
2009	New York Red Bulls	17	(1)
2010	Kitchee	0	(0)
Total		281	(15)

International career
1991–1992	Spain U16	2	(0)
1992	Spain U17	3	(0)
1993–1994	Spain U18	8	(1)
1996–1998	Spain U21	8	(1)
1998–2000	Spain	4	(0)
1998–2005	Catalonia	7	(1)

Managerial career
- 2013–2014: Spain U16
- 2014–2018: Spain U21
- 2017: Spain U17
- 2018: Spain (assistant)
- 2018: Real Madrid (assistant)
- 2019–2020: Valencia
- 2026: Pafos
- 2026: Cádiz
Medal record
Men's football
Representing Spain (as manager)
UEFA European Under-21 Championship
Runner-up	2017
- * Club domestic league appearances and goals

Albert Celades López (born 29 September 1975) is a Spanish former professional footballer who played as a defensive midfielder. He is currently a manager.

A tactically astute player with a strong defensive mentality, he was best known for his stints with Barcelona and Real Madrid, and he amassed La Liga total of 223 matches and eight goals over 12 seasons, totalling ten major titles with the clubs.

Celades appeared with the Spain national team at the 1998 World Cup. He worked as a manager after retiring, mainly with Spain's youth sides.

== Club career ==
Born in Barcelona, Catalonia, Celades – who left Barcelona at age seven with his family to live in Andorra– was a product of Barcelona's youth system. He made his debut with the main squad during 1995–96, and finished his first professional season with 16 games and two goals as the Catalans finished third in La Liga. Nevertheless, he would still spend another full campaign with the reserves.

Celades played 36 matches in 1997–98, mostly as a sweeper, as the Louis van Gaal-led team claimed the national title after a three-year drought. He also started both legs of the 1997 UEFA Super Cup, helping to a 3–1 aggregate victory over Borussia Dortmund, but appeared less significantly in the following season, with Barça renewing their domestic supremacy.

After a year with Celta de Vigo, Celades moved to Real Madrid, against which he had scored the winner (1–0) in the previous campaign, on 28 November 1999; he featured sparingly over four seasons, but added two league trophies and the 2001–02 UEFA Champions League to his résumé. He also spent 2003–04 on loan to Ligue 1 side Bordeaux.

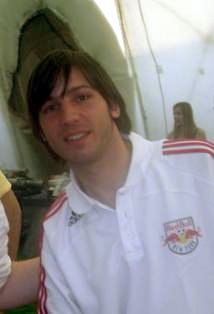
Celades with the New York Red Bulls in 2009

From 2005 to 2008, Celades represented Real Zaragoza. In his first year, he helped the club reach the Copa del Rey final, and would be relatively used during his tenure as the Aragonese were relegated at the end of 2007–08, and the player was released after his contract expired. In February 2009, he went on trial with the New York Red Bulls in the Major League Soccer and, after impressing, signed in March.

Celades retired from competitive football on 24 October 2009, immediately following the conclusion of the season. In early 2010, however, Kitchee from Hong Kong signed him alongside compatriot Agustín Aranzábal; they both appeared with the team at the 2010 Lunar New Year Cup, a mid-season exhibition tournament.

== International career ==
Celades earned four caps for Spain, and was a participant at the 1998 FIFA World Cup with two substitute appearances against Nigeria and Paraguay in an eventual group-stage exit. His debut was on 3 June that year, in a 4–1 friendly defeat of Northern Ireland in Santander where he started and played the entire game.

Celades' last match consisted of 30 minutes in a 2–1 away victory over Bosnia and Herzegovina for the 2002 World Cup qualifiers. He also represented the non-FIFA Catalonia side, scoring on his debut in a 5–0 defeat of Nigeria on 22 December 1998.

== Coaching career ==
On 7 May 2014, after Julen Lopetegui left for Porto, Celades was named manager of the Spanish under-21s after leaving the under-16 team. In October, the former lost their play-off against Serbia for entrance to the 2015 UEFA European Championship, in which they would have been defending champions; the 1–2 second leg loss in Cádiz was their first in 35 games.

On 18 July 2018, Celades resigned from his position at the Royal Spanish Football Federation after five years managing the youth sides, also having acted as assistant to the seniors during the 2014 and 2018 World Cups and UEFA Euro 2016. On 3 August, he was appointed as assistant coach of Real Madrid, reuniting with Lopetegui after their period at the Spanish Federation.

On 11 September 2019, Celades became manager of Valencia following the dismissal of Marcelino García Toral. His first match in charge took place three days later, in a 5–2 away defeat to his former club Barcelona. The following week, all players refused to accompany him at a press conference ahead of the Champions League fixture against Chelsea, in solidarity with his predecessor.

Celades was relieved of his duties on 29 June 2020, with the team ranked in eighth and six fixtures to go. On 9 January 2026, he was appointed at Cypriot First Division's Pafos on a two-and-a-half-year contract.

On 11 August 2026, Celades replaced Imanol Idiakez at the helm of Segunda División side Cádiz. He was himself dismissed on 19 October after just one win in ten matches.

== Managerial statistics ==
As of match played 18 October 2026

Managerial record by team and tenure
Team	Nat	From	To	Record							
Team	Nat	From	To	G	W	D	L	GF	GA	GD	Win %
Spain U16	(Spain)	1 July 2013	7 May 2014	2	1	0	1	3	4	−1	50.00
Spain U21	(Spain)	7 May 2014	18 July 2018	34	24	6	4	82	28	+54	70.59
Valencia	(Spain)	11 September 2019	29 June 2020	41	15	12	14	54	64	−10	36.59
Cádiz	(Spain)	11 August 2026	19 October 2026	10	1	4	5	11	13	−2	10.00
Career totals				91	44	23	24	158	111	+47	48.35

== Honours ==
Barcelona

- La Liga: 1997–98, 1998–99
- Copa del Rey: 1996–97, 1997–98
- UEFA Cup Winners' Cup: 1996–97
- UEFA Super Cup: 1997

Real Madrid

- La Liga: 2000–01, 2002–03
- Supercopa de España: 2001
- UEFA Champions League: 2001–02

Zaragoza

- Copa del Rey runner-up: 2005–06
