= Santiago Solari =

Argentine footballer and manager (born 1976)

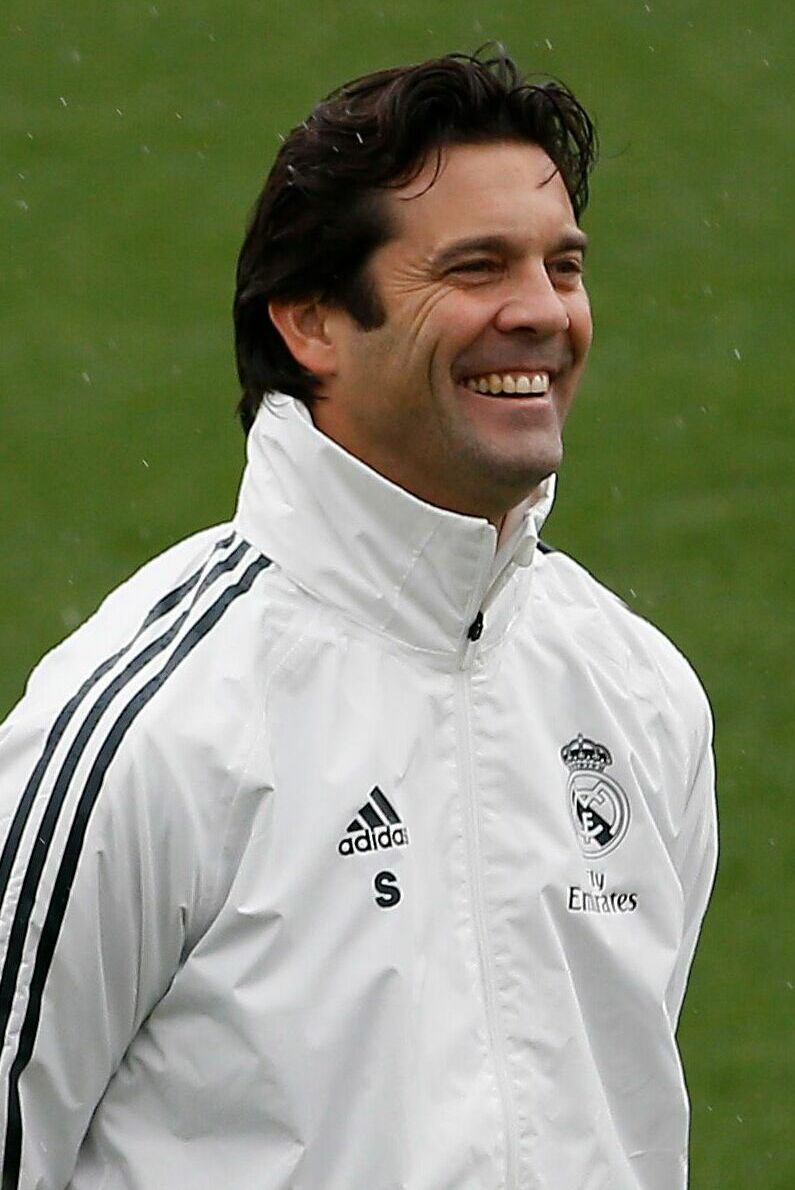
- Solari in 2019

Personal information
- Full name: Santiago Hernán Solari Poggio
- Date of birth: 7 October 1976 (age 50)
- Place of birth: Rosario, Argentina
- Height: 1.84 m (6 ft 0 in)
- Position: Left midfielder

Team information
- Current team: Real Madrid (director of football)

Youth career
- 1994–1995: Newell's Old Boys
- 1995–1996: Club Renato Cesarini

College career
Years	Team	Apps	(Gls)
1994	Stockton Ospreys		

Senior career*
Years	Team	Apps	(Gls)
1996–1998	River Plate	67	(13)
1999–2000	Atlético Madrid	46	(7)
2000–2005	Real Madrid	131	(10)
2005–2008	Inter Milan	39	(4)
2008–2009	San Lorenzo	26	(4)
2009–2010	Atlante	33	(5)
2010–2011	Peñarol	9	(0)
Total		351	(43)

International career
1999–2004	Argentina	11	(1)

Managerial career
- 2016–2018: Real Madrid Castilla
- 2018–2019: Real Madrid
- 2020–2022: América
- * Club domestic league appearances and goals

Santiago Hernán Solari Poggio (born 7 October 1976) is an Argentine professional football manager and former player who played as a left midfielder. A product of River Plate's extensive youth academy names, where he made his professional debut in 1996, Solari then went to play for two LaLiga clubs, Atlético Madrid and Real Madrid, and for Serie A club Inter Milan.

Solari began working as a coach in 2013, going on to spend several years associated with Real Madrid in different capacities.

== Playing career ==
=== Club ===
==== Early career and River ====
Born in Rosario, Santa Fe, Solari played youth football for Newell's Old Boys and Renato Cesarini, after returning from the United States where he attended Richard Stockton College in New Jersey. He joined River Plate midway through the 1995–96 season, making his Primera División debut on 12 May.

Solari appeared in 24 league games in his first full campaign, helping River to both the Apertura and Clausura tournaments.

==== Atlético Madrid ====
Solari moved to Spain late in the 1999 January transfer window, signing with Atlético Madrid. He played his first La Liga game on 7 February, in a 2–1 away loss against Salamanca.

Solari had his best individual season in 1999–2000 when he scored six goals in 34 matches, but the Colchoneros were relegated from the top division.

==== Real Madrid ====
Subsequently, Solari moved across the city to join Real Madrid, who paid Atlético his buyout clause of 600 million pesetas. After a poor first season he became a regular, albeit as a substitute; in the final of the 2001–02 UEFA Champions League, in which he played the full 90 minutes, he was involved in the play that led to Zinedine Zidane's wonder strike against Bayer Leverkusen, in an eventual 2–1 win.

Solari's best season with Real was 2003–04, but his five goals from 34 appearances – 15 starts, 1,539 minutes of action – could only help the side to the fourth position in the league. During his five-year spell he also played 49 matches in the Champions League, netting seven times.

==== Inter and later years ====
Solari signed a three-year contract with Inter Milan in the summer of 2005 for €6 million, being sparingly used during his three-year stint (maximum 21 games in his second season) but winning three consecutive Serie A titles to add to his trophy cabinet, the 2006 edition due to the Calciopoli scandal.

On 30 June 2008, Solari's contract with the Nerazzurri expired and he joined San Lorenzo shortly after. On 9 July of the following year, he moved teams and countries again and signed with Atlante from Mexico, again on a free transfer.

In early September 2010, the 34-year-old Solari signed with Uruguayan club Peñarol for one year, yet again as a free agent. He retired after only a couple of months.

=== International ===
Solari made eleven appearances for the Argentina national team in five years, but was not selected for any major international tournaments.

== Coaching career ==
=== Real Madrid ===
Solari started working as a manager in 2013, first being in charge of Real Madrid's youths. Ahead of the 2016–17 season, he was appointed at the reserves who competed in Segunda División B.

On 29 October 2018, Solari was named caretaker manager of the first team after the dismissal of Julen Lopetegui. He assumed the role the next day, and became the official coach 14 days later because in Spain no club was allowed to have a caretaker for more than two weeks. He won the FIFA Club World Cup during his tenure, extending Real's reign in the competition to three consecutive titles.

Solari was sacked on 11 March 2019, following a humiliating elimination from the UEFA Champions League by Ajax and replaced by his former teammate Zinedine Zidane.

=== Club América ===
On 29 December 2020, Solari was unveiled as the new manager of Club América from Mexico after signing a two-year contract, replacing the fired Miguel Herrera. He did not obtain his work permit in time, and as a result could not be on the sideline for the team's opening match of the season against Atlético San Luis. He made his Liga MX debut the following week in a 1–0 away defeat to Monterrey, and earned his first win against Juárez on 26 January. He led the side to a second-place finish in the general table, but was eliminated in the quarter-finals by Pachuca.

América began the Apertura 2021 tournament with four victories and one draw from five matches, taking Solari's total tally with the club to 18 wins from his first 27 games, tying the mark set by Leo Beenhakker during the 1994–95 campaign. He guided them to the final of the CONCACAF Champions League in late October, losing 1–0 to Monterrey. The team finished the Apertura regular phase first in the table with 37 points, though once again falling at the quarter-final stage, being ousted by Club Universidad Nacional 3–1 on aggregate; they had managed to remain unbeaten at home throughout the 2021 calendar year (winning 13 and drawing three).

Solari was dismissed on 2 March 2022, after a poor run of results, departing after eight games in the Grita México Clausura 2022.

== Style of play ==
A dynamic and versatile left-footed winger, with excellent technical ability, Solari was mainly known for his dribbling skills, although he was also an accurate passer and was capable of striking the ball from distance with both feet.

== Broadcasting ==
Since 2010, Solari worked as pundit for ESPN.

== Personal life ==
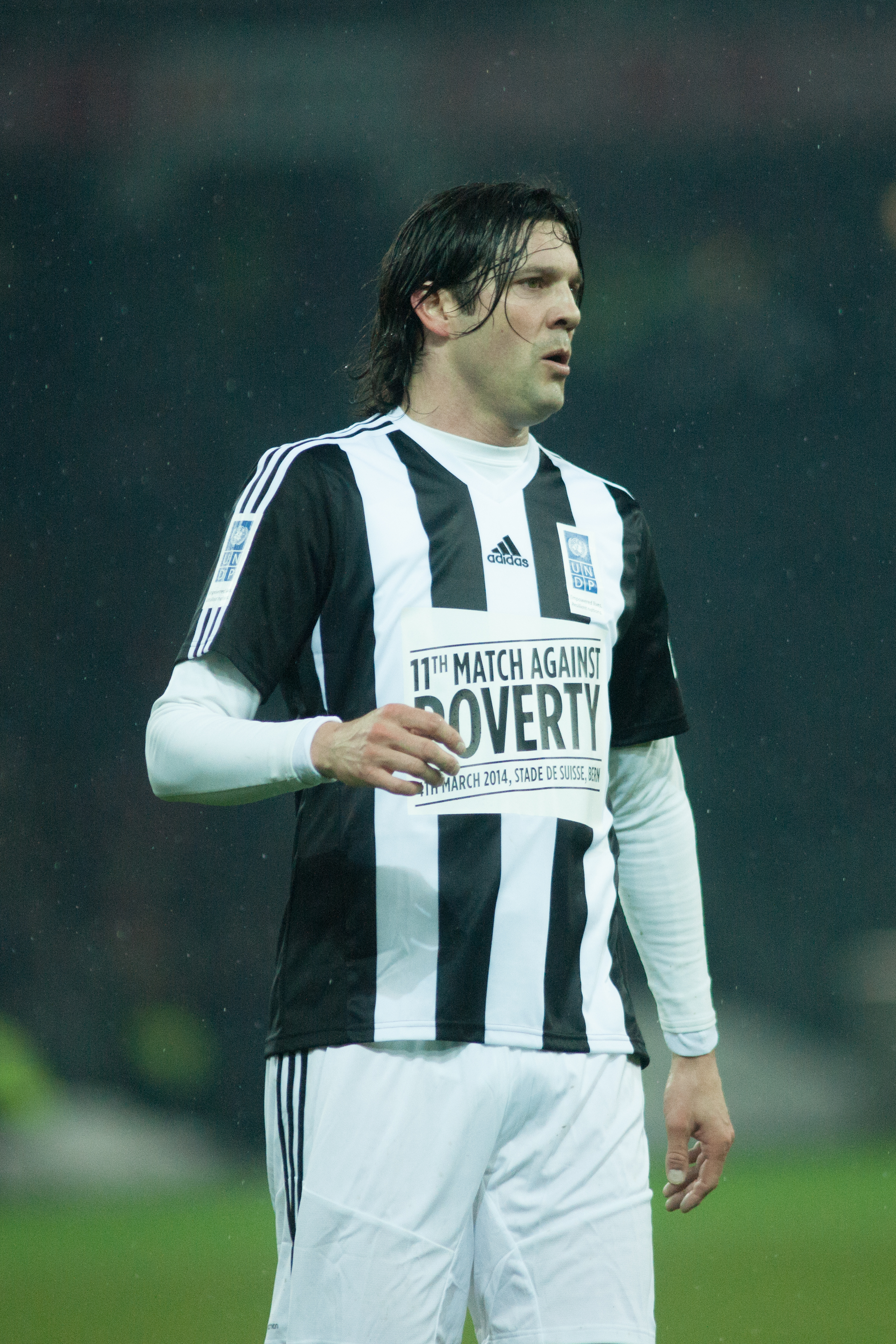
Solari playing in the 2014 Match Against Poverty

Nicknamed Indiecito (Little Indian in Spanish), Solari came from a sporting family: his uncle Jorge, his father Eduardo and two of his four siblings, younger Esteban and David, were also footballers. His younger sister, Liz, worked as an actress. He is of Spanish and Italian descent.

His uncle Jorge played for several clubs during his career, mostly River Plate, whilst his cousin Natalia married Fernando Redondo who also represented Real Madrid. All but David played for Argentina.

== Career statistics ==
=== Club ===
Appearances and goals by club, season and competition
Club	Season	League			Cup (Note: Includes Copa del Rey, Coppa Italia.)		Continental		Other		Total	
Club	Season	Division	Apps	Goals	Apps	Goals	Apps	Goals	Apps	Goals	Apps	Goals
River Plate	1996–97	Primera División	24	2	—		1	0	—		25	2
River Plate	1997–98	Primera División	27	6	—		9	1	—		36	7
River Plate	1998–99	Primera División	16	5	—		—		—		16	5
River Plate	Total		67	13	—		10	1	—		77	14
Atlético Madrid	1998–99	La Liga	12	1	3	0	1	0	—		16	1
Atlético Madrid	1999–2000	La Liga	34	6	4	0	7	0	—		45	6
Atlético Madrid	Total		46	7	7	0	8	0	0	0	61	7
Real Madrid	2000–01	La Liga	14	1	1	0	10	1	0	0	25	2
Real Madrid	2001–02	La Liga	28	1	9	0	14	4	2	0	53	5
Real Madrid	2002–03	La Liga	28	0	3	1	11	0	2	0	44	1
Real Madrid	2003–04	La Liga	34	5	9	2	9	2	1	0	53	9
Real Madrid	2004–05	La Liga	27	3	2	2	5	0	—		34	5
Real Madrid	Total		131	10	24	5	57	7	5	0	217	22
Inter Milan	2005–06	Serie A	13	3	7	2	6	0	0	0	26	5
Inter Milan	2006–07	Serie A	21	1	5	0	4	0	0	0	30	1
Inter Milan	2007–08	Serie A	5	0	5	1	5	0	0	0	15	1
Inter Milan	Total		39	4	17	3	15	0	0	0	71	7
San Lorenzo	2008–09	Primera División	26	4	—		3	0	—		29	4
Atlante	2009–10	Liga MX	29	4	—		—		5	0	34	4
Atlante	2010–11	Liga MX	4	1	—		—		—		4	1
Atlante	Total		33	5	—		—		5	0	38	5
Peñarol	2010–11	Primera División	9	0	—		2	0	—		11	0
Career total			351	43	48	8	87	8	10	0	496	59

=== International ===
Appearances and goals by national team and year
National team	Year	Apps	Goals
Argentina	1999	1	0
Argentina	2000	1	1
Argentina	2001	0	0
Argentina	2002	3	0
Argentina	2003	4	0
Argentina	2004	2	0
Total		11	1

Score and result list Argentina's goal tally first, score column indicates score after Solari goal.

International goal scored by Santiago Solari
No.	Date	Venue	Opponent	Score	Result	Competition
1	20 December 2000	Memorial Coliseum, Los Angeles, United States	Mexico	1–0	2–0	Friendly

== Managerial statistics ==
As of 2 March 2022

Managerial record by team and tenure
Team	Nat	From	To	Record								Ref
Team	Nat	From	To	G	W	D	L	GF	GA	GD	Win %	Ref
Real Madrid B	(Spain)	19 July 2016	29 October 2018	86	32	29	25	112	92	+20	37.21	
Real Madrid	(Spain)	30 October 2018	11 March 2019	32	22	2	8	71	37	+34	68.75	
América	(Mexico)	29 December 2020	2 March 2022	50	26	12	12	68	48	+20	52.00	
Total				168	80	43	45	251	177	+74	47.62	—

== Honours ==
=== Player ===
River Plate

- Argentine Primera División: Apertura 1996, Clausura 1997, Apertura 1997
- Supercopa Libertadores: 1997

Real Madrid

- La Liga: 2000–01, 2002–03
- Supercopa de España: 2001, 2003
- UEFA Champions League: 2001–02
- UEFA Super Cup: 2002
- Intercontinental Cup: 2002

Inter Milan

- Serie A: 2005–06, 2006–07, 2007–08
- Coppa Italia: 2005–06
- Supercoppa Italiana: 2005, 2006

=== Manager ===
Real Madrid

- FIFA Club World Cup: 2018

América

- CONCACAF Champions League runner-up: 2021
