= Álvaro Mejía (footballer) =

Spanish footballer

Personal information
- Full name: Álvaro Mejía Pérez
- Date of birth: 18 January 1982 (age 44)
- Place of birth: Madrid, Spain
- Height: 1.81 m (5 ft 11 in)
- Position: Defender

Youth career
- 1993–1998: Las Rozas
- 1998–2001: Real Madrid

Senior career*
Years	Team	Apps	(Gls)
2001–2002	Real Madrid C	10	(1)
2002–2004	Real Madrid B	44	(0)
2004–2007	Real Madrid	40	(1)
2007–2010	Murcia	100	(4)
2010–2011	Arles-Avignon	12	(0)
2011–2012	Konyaspor	42	(2)
2012–2013	Almería	22	(1)
2013–2014	Ergotelis	26	(0)
2014–2020	Al Shahaniya	137	(0)
Total		433	(9)
- * Club domestic league appearances and goals

Álvaro Mejía Pérez (born 18 January 1982) is a Spanish former professional footballer who played primarily as a central defender.

== Club career ==
Born in Madrid, Mejía started his career at Las Rozas. He signed for Real Madrid in 1998, subsequently moving up the various youth ranks.

Mejía joined the third team for 2001–02 but moved shortly after to the reserves, being admitted to the main squad the following season and making his La Liga debut in a 2–1 home win against Villarreal on 24 January 2004. He also appeared in the UEFA Champions League's round of 16 on 3 March (again playing the full match) in a 1–0 home victory over Bayern Munich. In May he renewed his contract until 2010, and he was subsequently put to use in different defensive positions.

The following year, Mejía appeared in just eight games for Real Madrid in all competitions, adding 26 in the league over the next two seasons. His only goal came in a 2–0 away defeat of Real Betis on 29 October 2005 after one minute on the pitch, having come on as a substitute for Carlos Diogo.

In July 2007, Mejía joined top-flight newcomers Real Murcia on a four-year deal, and scored in the first league round in a 2–1 home win over Real Zaragoza. A starter throughout the vast majority of the campaign, he faced relegation for the first time in his career.

On 30 July 2010, after Murcia dropped another tier, Mejía moved to Arles-Avignon in France, newly promoted to Ligue 1, on a one-year contract. In January of the following year, he changed teams – and countries – again, signing for Turkish Süper Lig club Konyaspor.

On 13 July 2012, Mejía agreed to a one-year deal with Almería in the Segunda División, after passing his medical. On 18 June 2014, after one season in the Super League Greece with Ergotelis, he joined newly promoted Qatar Stars League side Al Shahaniya.

== Career statistics ==
As of 4 April 2015

Club	Season	League			Cup		Other		Total	
Club	Season	Division	Apps	Goals	Apps	Goals	Apps	Goals	Apps	Goals
Real Madrid	2003–04	La Liga	9	0	2	0	3 (Note: Appearances in UEFA Champions League)	0	14	0
Real Madrid	2004–05	La Liga	5	0	3	0	0	0	8	0
Real Madrid	2005–06	La Liga	17	1	2	0	3	0	22	1
Real Madrid	2006–07	La Liga	9	0	2	0	2	0	13	0
Real Madrid	Total		40	1	9	0	8	0	57	1
Murcia	2007–08	La Liga	30	1	1	0	—		31	1
Murcia	2008–09	Segunda División	33	2	3	0	—		36	2
Murcia	2009–10	Segunda División	37	1	2	0	—		39	1
Murcia	Total		100	4	6	0	—		106	4
Arles-Avignon	2010–11	Ligue 1	12	0	2	0	—		14	0
Konyaspor	2010–11	Süper Lig	10	0	0	0	—		10	0
Konyaspor	2011–12	TFF First League	32	2	0	0	—		32	2
Konyaspor	Total		42	2	0	0	—		42	2
Almería	2012–13	Segunda División	22	1	2	0	4 (Note: Appearances in La Liga play-offs)	0	28	1
Ergotelis	2013–14	Super League Greece	26	0	1	0	—		27	0
Al Shahaniya	2014–15	Qatar Stars League	23	0	0	0	—		23	0
Career total			265	8	20	0	12	0	297	8

== Honours ==
Real Madrid

- La Liga: 2006–07

Al Shahaniya

- Qatari Second Division: 2017–18
