= Alfonso Pérez Burrull =

Spanish association football referee (born 1965)

Alfonso Pérez
- Full name: Alfonso Pérez Burrull
- Born: 15 September 1965 (age 61); Comillas, Cantabria, Spain
- Other occupation: Sales Representative

Domestic
Years	League	Role
1997–2010	La Liga	Referee

International
Years	League	Role
2002–2010	FIFA	Referee

Alfonso Pérez Burrull (Note: In this Spanish name, the first or paternal surname is Pérez and the second or maternal family name is Burrull.) (born 15 September 1965) is a Spanish association football referee is a former referee who officiated in the La Liga. He has been officiating since 1997, made his international debut in 2009 and retired in 2010.

== Career ==
Burrull has been officiating in the La Liga since the 1997-1998 season and has also officiated Europa League Qualifications along with Champions League Qualifications.

He was nominated to be the Fourth Official during the 2009 UEFA Cup Final, the last UEFA Cup held.

International Games

In 2002 Burrell became an FIFA accredited international referee, however had to wait until 2009 to officiate his first game, a friendly between Australia and Ireland.

Date	Home	Away	Result	Competition
August 13, 2009	(Republic of Ireland) Ireland	Australia	0-3	Friendly Match

== See also ==
- List of football referees
