= Eduardo Iturralde González =

Spanish football referee

- Full name: Eduardo Iturralde González
- Born: 20 February 1967 (age 59); Arrankudiaga, Spain
- Other occupation: Prosthodontist

Domestic
Years	League	Role
1995–2012	La Liga	Referee

International
Years	League	Role
1998–2012	FIFA listed	Referee

Eduardo Iturralde González (born 20 February 1967) is a retired Spanish football referee.

He frequently served as a referee for European matches in the Europa League and Champions League. Iturralde notably refereed the El Clásico on three occasions, in 1999, 2005 and most recently in November 2010, in which he was praised by Barcelona for his performance.

Iturralde González was the referee of the Republic of Ireland's 2–1 win over Armenia in the last Euro 2012 qualifying match. Early in the game, he sent off Armenian goalkeeper Roman Berezovsky for a handball, although video replays indicated that the ball hit his chest. Two days after the match, the Football Federation of Armenia officially filed a protest to UEFA over the goalkeeper's dismissal.

On 23 March 2012 he announced his retirement from refereeing due to disagreements with the Spanish Technical Committee, although it was already time for him to retire at the end of the 2011–12 season. His last game was Real Betis vs Real Madrid (2–3) on 10 March 2012. He could not finish this game due to a muscle injury, being substituted by the fourth referee, Gorka Sagués Oscoz, during half time.
