= 2004–05 Elche CF season =

Elche
2004–05 season
- President: Ramón Sánchez Esteve
- Head coach: Josu Uribe
- Segunda División: 10th
- Copa del Rey: Round of 16
- Top goalscorer: League: Nino (20); All: Nino (20)
- Biggest win: Elche 4–0 Sporting Gijón
- Biggest defeat: Eibar 5–2 Elche

The 2004–05 season was the 82nd season in the existence of Elche CF and the club's sixth consecutive season in the second division of Spanish football. In addition to the domestic league, Elche participated in this season's edition of the Copa del Rey. The season covered the period from 1 July 2004 to 30 June 2005.

== Competitions ==
=== Overview ===
Competition	First match	Last match	Starting round	Final position	Record							
Competition	First match	Last match	Starting round	Final position	Pld	W	D	L	GF	GA	GD	Win %
Segunda División	28 August 2004	18 June 2005	Matchday 1	10th	42	16	9	17	51	52	−1	38.10
Copa del Rey	27 October 2004	19 January 2005	First round	Round of 32	4	3	0	1	4	2	+2	75.00
Total					46	19	9	18	55	54	+1	41.30

Source: Competitions

=== Segunda División ===
==== League table ====
Pos	Team	Pld	W	D	L	GF	GA	GD	Pts
8	Xerez	42	14	17	11	39	36	+3	59
9	Tenerife	42	13	18	11	42	45	−3	57 (Note: TEN: 8 pts; ELC: 4 pts → ELC 4-0 SPG; SPG: 4 pts → SPG 3-1 ELC)
10	Elche	42	16	9	17	51	52	−1	57
11	Sporting Gijón	42	15	12	15	41	39	+2	57
12	Murcia	42	15	9	18	40	52	−12	54

Source: LFP – Liga Adelante
Rules for classification: 1st points; 2nd head-to-head points; 3rd head-to-head goal difference; 4th head-to-head goals scored; 5th goal difference; 6th number of goals scored; 7th Fair-play points

==== Results summary ====
Overall								Home						Away					
Pld	W	D	L	GF	GA	GD	Pts	W	D	L	GF	GA	GD	W	D	L	GF	GA	GD
42	16	9	17	51	52	−1	57	11	4	6	31	21	+10	5	5	11	20	31	−11

Source: Segunda División

==== Results by round ====
Round	1	2	3	4	5	6	7	8	9	10	11	12	13	14	15	16	17	18	19	20	21	22	23	24	25	26	27	28	29	30	31	32	33	34	35	36	37	38	39	40	41	42
Ground	A	H	A	H	A	H	A	H	A	H	A	H	A	H	A	H	A	H	A	A	H	H	A	H	A	H	A	H	A	H	A	H	A	H	A	H	A	H	A	H	H	A
Result	L	W	D	W	D	W	W	D	L	W	L	W	D	W	L	W	L	W	W	L	W	D	D	W	W	L	L	W	D	D	L	L	L	L	W	D	L	L	L	L	L	W
Position	14	8	9	8	7	4	2	4	7	5	8	5	5	3	4	4	4	3	3	3	3	4	6	6	3	4	4	4	4	5	6	7	6	6	6	6	6	7	8	10	11	10

Source: Segunda División
A = Away; H = Home; W = Win; D = Draw; L = Loss

==== Matches ====
28 August 2004 1	Tenerife	1–0	Elche	Santa Cruz de Tenerife
CEST (UTC+2)				Stadium: Estadio Heliodoro Rodríguez López

4 September 2004 2	Elche	3–1	Ciudad de Murcia	Elche
CEST (UTC+2)				Stadium: Martínez Valero

12 September 2004 3	Pontevedra	2–2	Elche	Pontevedra
CEST (UTC+2)				Stadium: Estadio Municipal de Pasarón

18 September 2004 4	Elche	1–0	Terrassa	Elche
CEST (UTC+2)				Stadium: Martínez Valero

25 September 2004 5	Xerez	1–1	Elche	Jerez de la Frontera
CEST (UTC+2)				Stadium: Chapín

3 October 2004 6	Elche	1–0	Eibar	Elche
CEST (UTC+2)				Stadium: Martínez Valero

9 October 2004 7	Lleida	1–2	Elche	Lleida
CEST (UTC+2)				Stadium: Camp d'Esports

17 October 2004 8	Elche	0–0	Almería	Elche
CEST (UTC+2)				Stadium: Martínez Valero

23 October 2004 9	Gimnàstic	2–0	Elche	Tarragona
CEST (UTC+2)				Stadium: Nou Estadi

31 October 2004 10	Elche	4–0	Sporting Gijón	Elche
CET (UTC+1)				Stadium: Martínez Valero

7 November 2004 11	Recreativo	2–1	Elche	Huelva
CET (UTC+1)				Stadium: Nuevo Colombino

14 November 2004 12	Elche	1–0	Real Murcia	Elche
CET (UTC+1)				Stadium: Martínez Valero

21 November 2004 13	Celta Vigo	2–2	Elche	Vigo
CET (UTC+1)				Stadium: Balaídos

28 November 2004 14	Elche	2–1	Racing Ferrol	Elche
CET (UTC+1)				Stadium: Martínez Valero

5 December 2004 15	Cádiz	3–1	Elche	Cádiz
CET (UTC+1)				Stadium: Ramón de Carranza

12 December 2004 16	Elche	2–1	Málaga B	Elche
CET (UTC+1)				Stadium: Martínez Valero

19 December 2004 17	Salamanca	2–0	Elche	Villares de la Reina
CET (UTC+1)				Stadium: Helmántico Stadium

22 December 2004 18	Elche	3–1	Poli Ejido	Elche
CET (UTC+1)				Stadium: Martínez Valero

8 January 2005 19	Córdoba	0–2	Elche	Córdoba
CET (UTC+1)				Stadium: Estadio Nuevo Arcángel

16 January 2005 20	Alavés	1–0	Elche	Vitoria-Gasteiz
CET (UTC+1)				Stadium: Mendizorrotza

22 January 2005 21	Elche	3–2	Valladolid	Elche
CET (UTC+1)				Stadium: Martínez Valero

29 January 2005 22	Elche	0–0	Tenerife	Elche
CET (UTC+1)				Stadium: Martínez Valero

6 February 2005 23	Ciudad de Murcia	0–0	Elche	Murcia
CET (UTC+1)				Stadium: Estadio de La Condomina

13 February 2005 24	Elche	2–0	Pontevedra	Elche
CET (UTC+1)				Stadium: Martínez Valero

19 February 2005 25	Terrassa	0–1	Elche	Terrassa
CET (UTC+1)				Stadium: Estadi Olímpic de Terrassa

27 February 2005 26	Elche	1–2	Xerez	Elche
CET (UTC+1)				Stadium: Martínez Valero

6 March 2005 27	Eibar	5–2	Elche	Eibar
CET (UTC+1)				Stadium: Ipurua

13 March 2005 28	Elche	2–1	Lleida	Elche
CET (UTC+1)				Stadium: Martínez Valero

20 March 2005 29	Almería	2–2	Elche	Almería
CET (UTC+1)				Stadium: Juegos Mediterráneos

27 March 2005 30	Elche	3–3	Gimnàstic	Elche
CET (UTC+1)				Stadium: Martínez Valero

3 April 2005 31	Sporting Gijón	3–1	Elche	Gijón
CEST (UTC+2)				Stadium: El Molinón

10 April 2005 32	Elche	0–1	Recreativo	Elche
CEST (UTC+2)				Stadium: Martínez Valero

16 April 2005 33	Murcia	1–0	Elche	Murcia
CEST (UTC+2)				Stadium: Estadio de La Condomina

24 April 2005 34	Elche	0–1	Celta Vigo	Elche
CEST (UTC+2)				Stadium: Martínez Valero

30 April 2005 35	Racing Ferrol	0–1	Elche	Ferrol
CEST (UTC+2)				Stadium: A Malata

7 May 2005 36	Elche	1–1	Cádiz	Elche
CEST (UTC+2)				Stadium: Martínez Valero

14 May 2005 37	Málaga B	1–0	Elche	Málaga
CEST (UTC+2)				Stadium: La Rosaleda

22 May 2005 38	Elche	0–2	Salamanca	Elche
CEST (UTC+2)				Stadium: Martínez Valero

29 May 2005 39	Poli Ejido	1–0	Elche	El Ejido
CEST (UTC+2)				Stadium: Santo Domingo

5 June 2005 40	Elche	1–2	Córdoba	Elche
CEST (UTC+2)	Nino 22'		Selu 26'; Sérvulo 78'	Stadium: Martínez Valero; Referee: Manuel Ángel Pérez Lima

12 June 2005 41	Elche	1–2	Alavés	Elche
CEST (UTC+2)	Nino 20'		Bodipo 23', 48'	Stadium: Martínez Valero; Referee: Miguel García Delgado

18 June 2005 42	Valladolid	1–2	Elche	Valladolid
CEST (UTC+2)	Losada 34'		Nino 8', 50'	Stadium: José Zorrilla; Referee: Ángel Rodado Rodríguez

=== Copa del Rey ===
27 October 2004 Round of 64	Sporting Gijón	1–2	Elche	Gijón
CEST (UTC+2)				Stadium: El Molinón; Referee: Carlos Delgado Ferreiro

10 November 2004 Round of 32	Elche	1–0	Deportivo La Coruña	Elche
CET (UTC+1)				Stadium: Martínez Valero; Referee: David Fernández Borbalán

12 January 2005 Round of 16; First leg	Elche	1–0	Numancia	Elche
CET (UTC+1)	Suárez 45'			Stadium: Martínez Valero; Referee: Miguel López-Cedrón

19 January 2005 Round of 16; First leg	Numancia	1–0 (a.e.t.) (5–3 p)	Elche	Soria
CET (UTC+1)	Miguel 69'			Stadium: Nuevo Estadio Los Pajaritos; Referee: José Javier Losantos Omar

== Statistics ==
=== Squad statistics ===
No.	Pos	Nat	Player	Total		Segunda División		Copa del Rey	
No.	Pos	Nat	Player	Apps	Goals	Apps	Goals	Apps	Goals
Goalkeepers
1	GK	(Spain) ESP	Jesús Unanua	30	0	30	0	0	0
13	GK	(Argentina) ARG	Willy Caballero	20	0	10+10	0	0	0
Defenders
3	DF	(Spain) ESP	Jorge Otero	17	0	15+2	0	0	0
4	DF	(Spain) ESP	Benja	23	0	20+3	0	0	0
12	DF	(Argentina) ARG	Diego Trotta	27	0	26+1	0	0	0
16	DF	(Spain) ESP	Francisco Noguerol	28	0	27+1	0	0	0
17	DF	(Spain) ESP	José Antonio Santana	17	0	13+4	0	0	0
20	DF	(Serbia and Montenegro) SCG	Igor Taševski	18	0	16+2	0	0	0
24	DF	(Spain) ESP	Unai Vergara	15	0	14+1	0	0	0
2	DF	(Andorra) AND	Marc Bernaus	32	0	30+2	0	0	0
Midfielders
5	MF	(Spain) ESP	Jesús Turiel	24	0	21+3	0	0	0
6	MF	(Spain) ESP	Txiki	34	2	28+6	2	0	0
10	MF	(Argentina) ARG	Ariel Zárate	16	0	2+14	0	0	0
18	MF	(Spain) ESP	Ismael Santiago	21	0	16+5	0	0	0
19	MF	(Spain) ESP	Alfredo Sánchez	34	3	33+1	3	0	0
21	MF	(Spain) ESP	Rubén Suárez	37	8	29+8	6	0	2
22	MF	(Spain) ESP	Pere Martí	11	0	6+5	0	0	0
23	MF	(Spain) ESP	Jorge Azkoitia	35	2	21+14	2	0	0
28	MF	(Spain) ESP	Fran Machado	1	0	0+1	0	0	0
Forwards
7	FW	(Spain) ESP	Nino	41	20	35+6	20	0	0
8	FW	(Spain) ESP	Raúl Ivars	4	1	0+4	1	0	0
9	FW	(Spain) ESP	Moisés	35	13	24+11	12	0	1
11	FW	(Spain) ESP	Luis Gil Torres	32	1	22+10	1	0	0
15	FW	(Spain) ESP	Roberto Peragón	32	3	20+12	2	0	1
25	FW	(Argentina) ARG	Lucas Valdemarín	5	0	0+5	0	0	0
Players who have made an appearance or had a squad number this season but have left the club

=== Goalscorers ===
Rank	No.	Pos	Nat	Name	Segunda División	Copa del Rey	Total
1	7	FW	(Spain)	Nino	20	0	20
2	9	FW	(Spain)	Moisés	12	1	13
3	21	MF	(Spain)	Rubén Suárez	5	2	7
4	19	MF	(Spain)	Alfredo Sánchez	3	0	3
4	15	FW	(Spain)	Roberto Peragón	2	1	3
6	6	MF	(Spain)	Txiki	2	0	2
6	23	MF	(Spain)	Jorge Azkoitia	2	0	2
Totals					51	4	55
