= 2000–01 Real Murcia season =

Real Murcia
2000–01 season
- Head coach: Rafael Alcaide Crespín; Pepe Mel
- Stadium: Estadio de La Condomina
- Segunda División: 13th
- Copa del Rey: Round of 16
- Top goalscorer: League: José Luis Loreto (17); All: José Luis Loreto (17)
- Biggest win: Murcia 5–0 Sporting Gijón
- Biggest defeat: Getafe 4–0 Murcia

The 2000–01 Real Murcia season was the club's 82nd season in existence and the first season back in the second division of Spanish football since 1994. In addition to the domestic league, Real Murcia participated in this season's edition of the Copa del Rey. The season covered the period from 1 July 2000 to 30 June 2021.

== Pre-season and friendlies ==
Win Draw Loss

== Competitions ==
=== Overview ===
Competition	First match	Last match	Starting round	Final position	Record							
Competition	First match	Last match	Starting round	Final position	Pld	W	D	L	GF	GA	GD	Win %
Segunda División	3 September 2000	16 June 2001	Matchday 1	13th	42	13	13	16	53	54	−1	30.95
Copa del Rey	13 December 2000	17 January 2001	Round of 64	Round of 16	4	1	1	2	8	9	−1	25.00
Total					46	14	14	18	61	63	−2	30.43

Source: Competitions

=== Segunda División ===
==== League table ====
Pos	Team	Pld	W	D	L	GF	GA	GD	Pts
11	Extremadura	42	16	10	16	42	46	−4	58
12	Córdoba	42	14	14	14	40	43	−3	56
13	Murcia	42	13	13	16	53	54	−1	52
14	Badajoz	42	10	21	11	34	38	−4	51
15	Eibar	42	11	17	14	30	32	−2	50

Rules for classification: 1st points; 2nd head-to-head points; 3rd head-to-head goal difference; 4th head-to-head goals scored; 5th goal difference; 6th number of goals scored; 7th Fair-play points

==== Results summary ====
Overall								Home						Away					
Pld	W	D	L	GF	GA	GD	Pts	W	D	L	GF	GA	GD	W	D	L	GF	GA	GD
42	13	13	16	53	54	−1	52	7	9	5	27	19	+8	6	4	11	26	35	−9

==== Results by round ====
Round	1	2	3	4	5	6	7	8	9	10	11	12	13	14	15	16	17	18	19	20	21	22	23	24	25	26	27	28	29	30	31	32	33	34	35	36	37	38	39	40	41	42
Ground	A	H	A	H	A	H	A	H	A	H	A	H	A	H	A	H	A	H	A	A	H	H	A	H	A	H	A	H	A	H	A	H	A	H	A	H	A	H	A	H	H	A
Result	L	D	L	W	D	W	W	W	L	W	L	D	D	D	W	D	L	L	W	D	L	D	W	D	L	W	L	W	L	D	L	L	D	D	W	D	L	L	L	W	L	W
Position	18	14	19	14	14	9	7	3	7	5	8	8	8	11	7	8	10	12	8	8	12	11	10	11	13	10	12	10	12	12	13	15	15	15	13	14	15	15	15	15	15	13

Source: Segunda División
A = Away; H = Home; W = Win; D = Draw; L = Loss

==== Matches ====
3 September 2000 1	Sevilla	2–1	Murcia	Seville
CEST (UTC+2)

10 September 2000 2	Murcia	0–0	Lleida	Murcia
CEST (UTC+2)				Stadium: Estadio de La Condomina

17 September 2000 3	Leganés	3–2	Murcia	Leganés
CEST (UTC+2)

24 September 2000 4	Murcia	2–0	Albacete	Murcia
CEST (UTC+2)				Stadium: Estadio de La Condomina

1 October 2000 5	Sporting Gijón	2–2	Murcia	Gijón
CEST (UTC+2)

8 October 2000 6	Murcia	2–1	Getafe	Murcia
CEST (UTC+2)				Stadium: Estadio de La Condomina

15 October 2000 7	Levante	2–3	Murcia	Valencia
CEST (UTC+2)

22 October 2000 8	Murcia	2–0	Recreativo de Huelva	Murcia
CEST (UTC+2)				Stadium: Estadio de La Condomina

29 October 2000 9	Real Jaén	2–1	Murcia	Jaén
CEST (UTC+2)

1 November 2000 10	Murcia	2–0	Compostela	Murcia
CET (UTC+1)				Stadium: Estadio de La Condomina

5 November 2000 11	Real Betis	2–1	Murcia	Seville
CET (UTC+1)

12 November 2000 12	Murcia	1–1	Racing Ferrol	Murcia
CET (UTC+1)				Stadium: Estadio de La Condomina

19 November 2000 13	Badajoz	1–1	Murcia	Badajoz
CET (UTC+1)

26 November 2000 14	Murcia	1–1	Atlético Madrid	Murcia
CET (UTC+1)				Stadium: Estadio de La Condomina

3 December 2000 15	Córdoba	1–3	Murcia	Córdoba
CET (UTC+1)

10 December 2000 16	Murcia	1–1	Universidad de Las Palmas	Murcia
CET (UTC+1)				Stadium: Estadio de La Condomina

16 December 2000 17	Tenerife	1–0	Murcia	Santa Cruz de Tenerife
CET (UTC+1)

20 December 2000 18	Murcia	1–3	Extremadura	Murcia
CET (UTC+1)				Stadium: Estadio de La Condomina

7 January 2001 19	Eibar	0–1	Murcia	Eibar
CET (UTC+1)

14 January 2001 20	Elche	1–1	Murcia	Elche
CET (UTC+1)

21 January 2001 21	Murcia	1–2	Salamanca	Murcia
CET (UTC+1)				Stadium: Estadio de La Condomina

28 January 2001 22	Murcia	1–1	Sevilla	Murcia
CET (UTC+1)				Stadium: Estadio de La Condomina

4 February 2001 23	Lleida	0–1	Murcia	Lleida
CET (UTC+1)

11 February 2001 24	Murcia	2–2	Leganés	Murcia
CET (UTC+1)				Stadium: Estadio de La Condomina

18 February 2001 25	Albacete	2–1	Murcia	Albacete
CET (UTC+1)

25 February 2001 26	Murcia	5–0	Sporting Gijón	Murcia
CET (UTC+1)				Stadium: Estadio de La Condomina

4 March 2001 27	Getafe	4–0	Murcia	Getafe
CET (UTC+1)

11 March 2001 28	Murcia	2–0	Levante	Murcia
CET (UTC+1)				Stadium: Estadio de La Condomina

18 March 2001 29	Recreativo de Huelva	4–1	Murcia	Huelva
CET (UTC+1)

25 March 2001 30	Murcia	2–2	Real Jaén	Murcia
CET (UTC+1)				Stadium: Estadio de La Condomina

1 April 2001 31	Compostela	2–0	Murcia	Santiago de Compostela
CEST (UTC+2)

8 April 2001 32	Murcia	1–3	Real Betis	Murcia
CEST (UTC+2)				Stadium: Estadio de La Condomina

15 April 2001 33	Racing Ferrol	1–1	Murcia	Ferrol
CEST (UTC+2)

22 April 2001 34	Murcia	0–0	Badajoz	Murcia
CEST (UTC+2)				Stadium: Estadio de La Condomina

28 April 2001 35	Atlético Madrid	0–3	Murcia	Madrid
CEST (UTC+2)

6 May 2001 36	Murcia	0–0	Córdoba	Murcia
CEST (UTC+2)				Stadium: Estadio de La Condomina

13 May 2001 37	Universidad de Las Palmas	2–1	Murcia	Las Palmas
CEST (UTC+2)

19 May 2001 38	Murcia	0–1	Tenerife	Murcia
CEST (UTC+2)				Stadium: Estadio de La Condomina

27 May 2001 39	Extremadura	2–0	Murcia	Extremadura
CEST (UTC+2)

3 June 2001 40	Murcia	1–0	Eibar	Murcia
CEST (UTC+2)				Stadium: Estadio de La Condomina

10 June 2001 41	Murcia	0–1	Elche	Murcia
CEST (UTC+2)				Stadium: Estadio de La Condomina

16 June 2001 42	Salamanca	1–2	Murcia	Salamanca
CEST (UTC+2)

=== Copa del Rey ===
13 December 2000 Round of 64	Murcia	3–1 (a.e.t.)	Elche	Murcia
CET (UTC+1)				Stadium: Estadio de La Condomina

3 January 2001 Round of 32	Real Jaén	1–1 (a.e.t.) (8–9 p)	Murcia	Jaén
CET (UTC+1)				Stadium: Nuevo Estadio de La Victoria

10 January 2001 Round of 16; First leg	Murcia	2–3	Zaragoza	Murcia
CET (UTC+1)				Stadium: Estadio de La Condomina

17 January 2001 Round of 16; Second leg	Zaragoza	4–1 (7–4 agg.)	Murcia	Zaragoza
CET (UTC+1)				Stadium: La Romareda

== Statistics ==
=== Goalscorers ===
Rank	Pos	No.	Nat	Name	Segunda División	Copa del Rey	Total
1	FW	11	(Spain)	José Luis Loreto	17	0	17
2	MF	10	(Spain)	Pepe Aguilar	6	0	6
2	FW	9	(Spain)	Luis Gil Torres	5	1	6
2	FW	28	(Argentina)	Rolando Zárate	6	0	6
Totals					53	8	61
