= 1918 in association football =

The following are the football (soccer) events of the year 1918 throughout the world.

== Events ==
Due to the First World War several European leagues remain suspended.

== Winners club national championship ==
- Argentina: Racing Club
- Austria: Floridsdorfer AC
- Belgium: no national championship
- Denmark: KB
- England: no national championship
- France: no national championship
- Germany: no national championship
- Hungary: MTK Hungária FC
- Iceland: Fram
- Italy: no national championship
- Luxembourg: CS Fola Esch
- Netherlands: Ajax Amsterdam
- Paraguay: Cerro Porteño
- Scotland:
  - Division One: Rangers F.C.
  - Scottish Cup: No competition
- Sweden: IFK Göteborg
- Uruguay: Peñarol
- Greece: 1913 to 1921 - no championship titles due to the First World War and the Greco-Turkish War of 1919-1922.

== Births ==
- March 3 – Bob Redfern, English professional footballer
- March 30 – Bob Hacking, English professional footballer (died 2001)
- May 18 – Franjo Wölfl, Croatian and Yugoslavian international footballer (died 1987)
- October 24 – Rafael Iriondo, Spanish international footballer and manager (died 2016)
- December 16 – Pierita (Andrés Domínguez Candal), Spanish footballer (died 1978)
