= 2000–01 Copa del Rey =

99th Copa del Rey

Tournament details
- Country: Spain
- Dates: 30 August 2000 – 30 June 2001
- Teams: 80

Final positions
- Champions: Zaragoza (5th title)
- Runner-up: Celta Vigo

Tournament statistics
- Matches played: 110
- Goals scored: 284 (2.58 per match)
- Top goal scorer(s): Salva Ballesta (6 goals)

The 2000–01 Copa del Rey was the 99th staging of the Copa del Rey.

The competition started on 30 August 2000 and concluded on 30 March 2001 with the Final, held at the Estadio La Cartuja in Sevilla.

== Format ==
Schedule
Round	Fixture	Clubs	Gain entry
Preliminary round	17	80 → 63	Teams from: 2ª División B and 3ª División (*)
Round of 64	31	63 → 32	Teams from: 1ª División and 2ª División
Round of 32	16	32 → 16	
Round of 16	8	16 → 8	
Quarter-finals	4	8 → 4	
Semi-finals	2	4 → 2	
Final	1	2 → 1	

Teams
Division	No. clubs
1ª División	20
2ª División	22
2ª División B	25
3ª División	13
Total teams	80

- All rounds are played over two legs apart the final which is played a single match in a neutral venue and the Rounds of 32 and 64, which are played a single match playoff in the field of lower-level opponent. In these rounds teams from 1ª División start as top seeds and can not face each other.
- In the event that aggregate scores finish level, the away goals rule. (This rule applies also in extra time)
- In case of a tie on aggregate, will play an extra time of 30 minutes, and if no goals are scored during extra time, the tie is decided by penalty shootout.
- The winners of the competition will earn a place in the group stage of next season's UEFA Cup, if they have not already qualified for European competition, if so then the runners-up will instead take this berth.

(*) CD Toledo, CD Logroñés, Gimnástica de Torrelavega, Granada CF from Segunda B / 3ª División, started the tournament in the second round.

== Preliminary round ==
Preliminary round
Home 1st leg	Agg.	Home 2nd leg	1st leg			2nd leg			Notes
CD Coslada	1–5	CD Mensajero	30 Aug 2000	0–1	Rep.	6 Sep 2000	4–1	Rep.	
UD Xove Lago	0–5	CD Ourense	30 Aug 2000	0–1	Rep.	6 Sep 2000	4–0	Rep.	
CD Lealtad	2–6	UD San Sebastián de los Reyes	30 Aug 2000	1–4	Rep.	6 Sep 2000	2–1	Rep.	
La Bañeza FC	2–3	UD Orotava	30 Aug 2000	1–2		6 Sep 2000	1–1	Rep.	
SD Lemona	2–2 (a)	Barakaldo CF	30 Aug 2000	2–1		6 Sep 2000	1–0	Rep.	
UD Fraga	2–6	SD Beasain	30 Aug 2000	2–4	Rep.	6 Sep 2000	2–0	Rep.	
SD Noja	2–4	Burgos CF	30 Aug 2000	0–1	Rep.	6 Sep 2000	3–2	Rep.	
CD Aurrerá	1–0	CD Peña Sport	30 Aug 2000	0–0	Rep.	6 Sep 2000	0–1	Rep.	
Atlético Baleares	2–2 (a)	CF Gandía	30 Aug 2000	2–1	Rep.	6 Sep 2000	1–0	Rep.	
CF Balaguer	3–5	CD Burriana	30 Aug 2000	2–2		6 Sep 2000	3–1	Rep.	
Hércules CF	2–3	UDA Gramenet	30 Aug 2000	0–1	Rep.	6 Sep 2000	2–2	Rep.	
CD Castellón	1–4	UE Figueres	30 Aug 2000	1–1	Rep.	6 Sep 2000	1–0	Rep.	
Club Olímpico de Totana	0–8	AD Ceuta	30 Aug 2000	0–2	Rep.	6 Sep 2000	6–0	Rep.	
UD Puertollano	2–6	Guadix CF	30 Aug 2000	2–4	Rep.	6 Sep 2000	2–0	Rep.	
CD Don Benito	3–4	Xerez CD	30 Aug 2000	2–1	Rep.	6 Sep 2000	3–1	Rep.	
Dos Hermanas CF	3–4	Polideportivo Ejido	30 Aug 2000	2–2	Rep.	6 Sep 2000	2–1	Rep.	
Polideportivo Almería	0–1	Algeciras CF	30 Aug 2000	0–0	Rep.	6 Sep 2000	1–0	Rep.	

== Round of 64 ==
Home	Score	Visitor	Match details			Notes
CD Toledo	2–1	Real Madrid CF	13 Dec 2000	Salto del Caballo, Toledo	Rep.	
SD Eibar	0–1	Real Zaragoza	13 Dec 2000	Ipurua, Eibar	Rep.	
UD Orotava	1–1 (p)	Rayo Vallecano	13 Dec 2000	Los Cuartos, La Orotava	Rep.	Penalties: 2–4 for Rayo Vallecano
CD Ourense	0–2	Real Valladolid CF	13 Dec 2000	O Couto, Ourense	Rep.	
CD Mensajero	0–1	Celta de Vigo	13 Dec 2000	Silvestre Carrillo, Sta. Cruz de La Palma	Rep.	
Universidad de Las Palmas CF	0–1	Deportivo de La Coruña	13 Dec 2000	Pepe Gonçalvez, Las Palmas	Rep.	
CD Tenerife	2–1	Real Oviedo CF	13 Dec 2000	Heliodoro Rodríguez López, Sta. Cruz	Rep.	
Sporting de Gijón	1–1 (p)	UD Las Palmas	13 Dec 2000	El Molinón, Gijón	Rep.	Penalties: 4–5 for UD Las Palmas
Racing de Ferrol	0–1	CD Leganés	13 Dec 2000	A Malata, Ferrol	Rep.	
SD Compostela	3–0	Getafe CF	13 Dec 2000	Multiusos de San Lázaro, Compostela	Rep.	
Atlético de Madrid	1–0	UD Salamanca	13 Dec 2000	Vicente Calderón, Madrid	Rep.	
CD Logroñés	0–2	CA Osasuna	13 Dec 2000	Las Gaunas, Logroño	Rep.	
CD Aurrerá	0–2	Athletic Bilbao	13 Dec 2000	Olaranbe, Vitoria-Gasteiz	Rep.	
Gimnástica de Torrelavega	2–2 (p)	Deportivo Alavés	13 Dec 2000	El Malecón, Torrelavega	Rep.	Penalties: 4–1 for Gimnástica de Torrelavega
Barakaldo CF	1–1 (p)	CD Numancia	13 Dec 2000	Nuevo Lasesarre, Barakaldo	Rep.	Penalties: 3–4 for CD Numancia
Levante UD	3–0	UE Lleida	13 Dec 2000	Ciutat de València, Valencia	Rep.	
Polideportivo Ejido	1–2	Guadix CF	13 Dec 2000	Santo Domingo, Ejido	Rep.	
Granada CF	1–0	Recreativo de Huelva	13 Dec 2000	Nuevo Los Cármenes, Granada	Rep.	
Real Jaén CF	2–1 (aet)	Real Betis	13 Dec 2000	Nuevo Estadio de La Victoria, Jaén	Rep.	
Córdoba CF	0–2 (aet)	CD Badajoz	13 Dec 2000	Nuevo Arcángel, Córdoba	Rep.	
Xerez CD	2–1	Sevilla FC	13 Dec 2000	Mpal. de Chapín, Jerez de la Frontera	Rep.	
Burgos CF	0–2	Racing de Santander	13 Dec 2000	El Plantío, Burgos	Rep.	
Real Murcia CF	3–1 (aet)	Elche CF	13 Dec 2000	La Condomina, Murcia	Rep.	
SD Beasain	2–1	Real Sociedad	13 Dec 2000	Loinaz, Beasain	Rep.	
Albacete Balompié	0–1	RCD Espanyol	13 Dec 2000	Carlos Belmonte, Albacete	Rep.	
UDA Gramenet	0–1	Valencia CF	12 Dec 2000	Nou Camp Municipal, Sta. Coloma	Rep.	
CF Gandía	0–3	FC Barcelona	12 Dec 2000	Guillermo Olagüe, Gandía	Rep.	
UE Figueres	0–2	RCD Mallorca	13 Dec 2000	Vilatenim, Figueres	Rep.	
CD Burriana	1–2 (aet)	Villarreal CF	12 Dec 2000	San Fernando, Burriana	Rep.	
Algeciras CF	0–3 (aet)	CF Extremadura	13 Dec 2000	Nuevo Mirador, Algeciras	Rep.	
AD Ceuta	3–2	Málaga CF	13 Dec 2000	Alfonso Murube, Ceuta	Rep.	
Bye: UD San Sebastián de los Reyes.

== Round of 32 ==
Home	Score	Visitor	Match details			Notes
Gimnástica de Torrelavega	2–1	UD Las Palmas	3 Jan 2001	El Malecón, Torrelavega	Rep.	
SD Beasain	0–3	Real Zaragoza	3 Jan 2001	Loinaz, Beasain	Rep.	
CD Toledo	0–1	Rayo Vallecano	3 Jan 2001	Salto del Caballo, Toledo	Rep.	
UD San Sebastián de los Reyes	1–2	Athletic Bilbao	2 Jan 2001	Mpal. Matapiñonera, SS. De los Reyes	Rep.	
SD Compostela	1–3 (aet)	Celta de Vigo	3 Jan 2001	Multiusos de San Lázaro, Compostela	Rep.	
CD Tenerife	3–2	Deportivo de La Coruña	3 Jan 2001	Heliodoro Rodríguez López, Sta. Cruz	Rep.	
Atlético de Madrid	3–1	CA Osasuna	3 Jan 2001	Vicente Calderón, Madrid	Rep.	
CF Extremadura	2–1 (aet)	Real Valladolid CF	3 Jan 2001	Francisco de la Hera, Almendralejo	Rep.	
CD Leganés	2–1	CD Numancia	3 Jan 2001	Mpal. de Butarque, Leganés	Rep.	
Xerez CD	0–3	RCD Mallorca	3 Jan 2001	Mpal. de Chapín, Jerez de la Frontera	Rep.	
AD Ceuta	0–3	FC Barcelona	3 Jan 2001	Alfonso Murube, Ceuta	Rep.	
Granada CF	1–1 (p)	Villarreal CF	2 Jan 2001	Nuevo Los Cármenes, Granada	Rep.	Penalties: 4–2 for Granada CF
Guadix CF	4–4 (p)	Valencia CF	3 Jan 2001	Mpa. de Guadix, Guadix	Rep.	Penalties: 6–5 for Guadix CF
Levante UD	0–2	RCD Espanyol	2 Jan 2001	Ciutat de València, Valencia	Rep.	
Real Jaén CF	1–1 (p)	Real Murcia CF	3 Jan 2001	Nuevo Estadio de La Victoria, Jaén	Rep.	Penalties: 8–9 for Real Murcia CF
CD Badajoz	0–4	Racing de Santander	3 Jan 2001	Nuevo Vivero, Badajoz	Rep.	

== Round of 16 ==
Team 1	Agg.	Team 2	1st leg	2nd leg
CD Leganés	2–2 (a)	Celta de Vigo	1–2	1–0
CD Tenerife	0–4	RCD Mallorca	0–2	0–2
CF Extremadura	1–2	RCD Espanyol	1–1	0–1
Gimnástica de Torrelavega	0–1	FC Barcelona	0–1	0–0
Guadix CF	0–0 (4–5 p)	Granada CF	0–0	0–0
Atlético de Madrid	4–2	Rayo Vallecano	2–2	2–0
Racing de Santander	2–0	Athletic Bilbao	2–0	0–0
Real Murcia CF	4–7	Real Zaragoza	2–3	1–4

=== First leg ===
10 January 2001	Racing de Santander	2–0	Athletic Bilbao	Santander
20:30 CET	Del Horno 4' (o.g.); Preciado 41'	Report (in Spanish)		Stadium: El Sardinero; Attendance: 12,000; Referee: Ansuátegui Roca

10 January 2001	Guadix CF	0–0	Granada CF	Guadix
20:30 CET		Report (in Spanish)		Stadium: Municipal de Guadix; Attendance: 2,200; Referee: Megía Dávila

10 January 2001	CD Leganés	1–2	Celta de Vigo	Leganés
21:00 CET	Morales 22'	Report (in Spanish)	Tomás 7'; Berizzo 82'	Stadium: Municipal de Butarque; Attendance: 2,500; Referee: Losantos Omar

10 January 2001	CF Extremadura	1–1	RCD Espanyol	Almendralejo
21:00 CET	Kalla 75'	Report (in Spanish)	Serrano 59'	Stadium: Francisco de la Hera; Attendance: 3,000; Referee: Medina Cantalejo

10 January 2001	Real Murcia CF	2–3	Real Zaragoza	Murcia
21:00 CET	Tonelotto 20'; Luis Gil 87'	Report (in Spanish)	Aragón 54'; José Ignacio 60'; Juanele 70'	Stadium: La Condomina; Attendance: 10,000; Referee: Esquinas Torres

10 January 2001	Gimnástica de Torrelavega	0–1	FC Barcelona	Torrelavega
21:15 CET		Report (in Spanish)	Rivaldo 74'	Stadium: El Malecón; Attendance: 12,000; Referee: Iturralde González (Basque Country (autonomous community))

10 January 2001	CD Tenerife	0–2	RCD Mallorca	Santa Cruz de Tenerife
22:00 CET		Report (in Spanish)	Basavilbaso 19' (o.g.); Eto'o 29'	Stadium: Heliodoro Rodríguez López; Attendance: 10,000; Referee: Daudén Ibáñez

11 January 2001	Atlético de Madrid	2–2	Rayo Vallecano	Madrid
21:30 CET	Salva 21', 25'	Report (in Spanish)	Quevedo 69'; De Quintana 85'	Stadium: Vicente Calderón; Attendance: 15,000; Referee: Ramírez Domínguez

=== Second leg ===
16 January 2001	FC Barcelona	0–0	Gimnástica de Torrelavega	Barcelona
21:30 CET		Report (in Spanish)		Stadium: Camp Nou; Attendance: 7,000; Referee: Bueno Grimal

17 January 2001	Athletic Bilbao	0–0	Racing de Santander	Bilbao
20:15 CET		Report (in Spanish)		Stadium: San Mamés; Attendance: 42,000; Referee: Andradas Asurmendi

17 January 2001	Granada CF	0–0 (a.e.t.) (5–4 p)	Guadix CF	Granada
20:30 CET		Report (in Spanish)		Stadium: Nuevo Los Cármenes; Attendance: 8,000; Referee: Pereñiguez Pérez
	Penalties
	Cervián (penalty scored); Pedro Vega (penalty scored); Álex (penalty missed); Huegún (penalty scored); Tabuenka (penalty missed); Robert (penalty scored); Pascual (penalty scored)		(penalty missed) Kuni; (penalty missed) Aguilera; (penalty scored) Samuel; (penalty scored) Juanma Cruz; (penalty scored) Pollo; (penalty scored) Pichi; (penalty missed) Pedro Triguero

17 January 2001	Real Zaragoza	4–1	Real Murcia CF	Zaragoza
20:30 CET	Jamelli 27'; Ferrón 29'; José Ignacio 61', 72'	Report (in Spanish)	Tonelotto 49'	Stadium: La Romareda; Attendance: 12,000; Referee: Llonch Andreu

17 January 2001	RCD Mallorca	2–0	CD Tenerife	Palma de Mallorca
21:00 CET	Carlitos 39', 69'	Report (in Spanish)		Stadium: Son Moix; Referee: Pérez Lasa

17 January 2001	RCD Espanyol	1–0	CF Extremadura	Barcelona
21:00 CET	Gâlcă 82' (pen.)	Report (in Spanish)		Stadium: Olímpic de Montjuïc; Attendance: 7,700; Referee: Undiano Mallenco

17 January 2001	Rayo Vallecano	0–2	Atletico de Madrid	Madrid
21:00 CET		Report (in Spanish)	Salva 16'; Kiko 78'	Stadium: Estadio Teresa Rivero; Attendance: 16,000; Referee: Pérez Burrull

17 January 2001	Celta de Vigo	0–1	CD Leganés	Vigo
21:15 CET		Report (in Spanish)	Makukula 80'	Stadium: Balaídos; Attendance: 5,000; Referee: Rodríguez Santiago (Castile and León)

== Quarter-finals ==
Team 1	Agg.	Team 2	1st leg	2nd leg
Celta de Vigo	4–3	RCD Mallorca	3–1	1–2
RCD Espanyol	2–3	FC Barcelona	1–2	1–1
Granada CF	1–4	Atlético de Madrid	0–1	1–3
Racing de Santander	1–3	Real Zaragoza	1–1	0–2

=== First leg ===
30 January 2001	RCD Espanyol	1–2	FC Barcelona	Barcelona
21:30 CET	Tamudo 57'	Report (in Spanish)	Rivaldo 13'; Alfonso 41'	Stadium: Olímpic de Montjuïc; Attendance: 24,300; Referee: Carmona Méndez

31 January 2001	Racing de Santander	1–1	Real Zaragoza	Santander
20:45 CET	Arzeno 72'	Report (in Spanish)	Ferrón 1'	Stadium: El Sardinero; Attendance: 9,000; Referee: García-Aranda

31 January 2001	Celta de Vigo	3–1	RCD Mallorca	Vigo
21:15 CET	Gustavo López 51' (pen.) 69'; Cáceres 77'	Report (in Spanish)	Finidi 15'	Stadium: Balaídos; Attendance: 15,000; Referee: López Nieto

31 January 2001	Granada CF	0–1	Atlético de Madrid	Granada
21:15 CET		Report (in Spanish)	Correa 40'	Stadium: Nuevo Los Cármenes; Attendance: 15,000; Referee: Eleicegui Uranga

=== Second leg ===
6 February 2001	Atlético de Madrid	3–1	Granada CF	Madrid
21:30 CET	Salva 30' 74' (pen.); Dani 52'	Report (in Spanish)	Puntas 76'	Stadium: Vicente Calderón; Attendance: 20,000; Referee: Téllez Sánchez

7 February 2001	RCD Mallorca	2–1	Celta de Vigo	Palma de Mallorca
21:00 CET	Nadal 45'; Engonga 85' (pen.)	Report (in Spanish)	Catanha 74'	Stadium: Son Moix; Attendance: 20,000; Referee: Iturralde González

7 February 2001	FC Barcelona	1–1	RCD Espanyol	Barcelona
21:00 CET	Frank De Boer 6'	Report (in Spanish)	Roger 19'	Stadium: Camp Nou; Attendance: 85,000; Referee: Pérez Burrull

7 February 2001	Real Zaragoza	2–0	Racing de Santander	Zaragoza
21:00 CET	Acuña 32'; Aguado 58'	Report (in Spanish)		Stadium: La Romareda; Attendance: 18,000; Referee: Losantos Omar

== Semi-finals ==
Team 1	Agg.	Team 2	1st leg	2nd leg
Celta de Vigo	4–2	FC Barcelona	3–1	1–1
Atlético de Madrid	1–2	Real Zaragoza	0–2	1–0

=== First leg ===
20 June 2001	Atlético de Madrid	0–2	Real Zaragoza	Madrid
21:30 CET		Report (in Spanish)	Acuña 28'; Jamelli 69'	Stadium: Vicente Calderón; Attendance: 25,000; Referee: Carmona Méndez

21 June 2001	Celta de Vigo	3–1	FC Barcelona	Vigo
21:30 CET	Berizzo 45+3'; Mostovoi 51'; Jesuli 70'	Report (in Spanish)	Simão 6'	Stadium: Balaídos; Attendance: 26,000; Referee: Ansuátegui Roca

=== Second leg ===
23 June 2001	Real Zaragoza	0–1	Atlético de Madrid	Zaragoza
21:30 CET		Report (in Spanish)	Fagiani 29'	Stadium: La Romareda; Attendance: 30,000; Referee: Losantos Omar

24 June 2001	FC Barcelona	1–1	Celta de Vigo	Barcelona
21:30 CET	Kluivert 4'	Report (in Spanish)	Berizzo 2'	Stadium: Camp Nou; Attendance: 26,000; Referee: Fernández Marín

== Final ==
30 June 2001
21:00 CET

Celta de Vigo	1–3	Real Zaragoza
Mostovoi 5'	Report (in Spanish)	Aguado 23'; Jamelli 38' (pen.); Yordi 90+4'

Sevilla
Stadium: La Cartuja
Attendance: 38,000
Referee: José María García-Aranda (Community of Madrid)

Copa del Rey
2000–01 winners
Real Zaragoza
5th title

== Top goalscorers ==
Goalscorers	Goals	Team
(Spain) Salva Ballesta	6	Atlético Madrid
(Spain) Julio Pineda	5	Xerez
(Spain) Pedro Triguero	5	Guadix
(Spain) Samuel Barrio	4	Guadix
(Argentina) Luis Tonelotto	3	Real Murcia
(Portugal) Silas	3	Ceuta
(Brazil) Paulo Jamelli	3	Zaragoza
(Spain) Carlitos	3	Mallorca
(Uruguay) Fernando Correa	3	Atlético Madrid
(Spain) Fernando Morán	3	Racing Santander
