= 2000–01 Real Madrid CF season =

99th season in existence of Real Madrid CF

Real Madrid
2000–01 season
- President: Florentino Pérez
- Head coach: Vicente del Bosque
- Stadium: Santiago Bernabéu
- La Liga: 1st
- Copa del Rey: Round of 64
- UEFA Champions League: Semi-finals
- UEFA Super Cup: Runners-up
- Intercontinental Cup: Runners-up
- Top goalscorer: League: Raúl (24); All: Raúl (32)
Home colours	Away colours	Third colours

The 2000–01 season was Real Madrid's 70th season in La Liga. This article lists all matches that the club played in the 2000–01 season, and also shows statistics of the club's players.

== Summary ==
This was the season where the club won its 28th La Liga title, having begun a new policy of signing the world's greatest players under a new president, Florentino Pérez, with a goal of making Real Madrid the most fashionable club in the world. Luís Figo was the arrival of the year, along with Claude Makélélé, and they helped a team of stars, dubbed the galácticos, win the league under Vicente del Bosque, as well as reaching the UEFA Champions League semi-finals as defending champions, where they were narrowly knocked out by Bayern Munich. The arrival of Luís Figo in July 2000 was controversial due to his move from Barcelona to Real Madrid, thus generating furious reactions from Barcelona fans and also Boixos Nois hooligans.

=== Overview ===
Competition	Record								Result	Top Scorer
Competition	G	W	D	L	GF	GA	GD	Win %	Result	Top Scorer
La Liga	38	24	8	6	81	40	+41	63.16	Winners	(Spain) Raúl, 24
Copa del Rey	1	0	0	1	1	2	−1	0.00	Round of 64	(Brazil) Sávio, 1
UEFA Champions League	16	9	2	5	35	23	+12	56.25	Semi-finals	(Spain) Raúl, 7
UEFA Super Cup	1	0	0	1	1	2	−1	0.00	Runners-up	(Spain) Raúl, 1
Intercontinental Cup	1	0	0	1	1	2	−1	0.00	Runners-up	(Brazil) Roberto Carlos, 1
Total	57	33	10	14	119	69	+50	57.89		(Spain) Raúl, 32

== Squad ==
Note: Flags indicate national team as defined under FIFA eligibility rules; some limited exceptions apply. Players may hold more than one non-FIFA nationality.

No.	Pos.	Nation	Player
1	GK	GER	Bodo Illgner
2	DF	ESP	Míchel Salgado
3	DF	BRA	Roberto Carlos
4	DF	ESP	Fernando Hierro
5	DF	ESP	Manolo Sanchís
6	DF	ESP	Iván Helguera
7	FW	ESP	Raúl
8	MF	ENG	Steve McManaman
9	FW	ESP	Fernando Morientes
10	MF	POR	Luís Figo
11	MF	BRA	Sávio
12	DF	ESP	Iván Campo
13	GK	ESP	César
14	MF	ESP	Guti
15	MF	CMR	Geremi
16	MF	BRA	Flávio Conceição
17	FW	ESP	Pedro Munitis

No.	Pos.	Nation	Player
18	DF	ESP	Aitor Karanka
19	FW	ESP	Tote
20	MF	ESP	Albert Celades
21	MF	ARG	Santiago Solari
22	MF	ESP	Álvaro Benito
23	DF	BRA	Júlio César
24	MF	FRA	Claude Makélélé
25	GK	ESP	Iker Casillas
26	MF	ESP	Alberto Rivera
27	GK	ESP	Carlos Sánchez
29	MF	ESP	Andrés Santos
30	FW	ESP	Sergio Sestelo
31	FW	ESP	Óscar Miñambres
33	DF	ESP	Enrique Corrales
34	DF	ESP	Francisco Pavón
36	DF	ESP	Rubén
37	MF	ESP	Zafra

=== Transfers ===
In
Pos.	Name	from	Type
MF	Luís Figo	Barcelona	€60M
MF	Flávio Conceição	Deportivo	€25M
MF	Claude Makélélé	Celta Vigo	€14M
FW	Pedro Munitis	Racing Santander	€12M
GK	César	Valladolid	€7M
MF	Santiago Solari	Atlético Madrid	€4M
MF	Albert Celades	Celta Vigo	
FW	Tote	Benfica	loan ended

Out
Pos.	Name	To	Type
MF	Fernando Redondo	AC Milan	
FW	Nicolas Anelka	Paris Saint-Germain	
FW	Elvir Baljic	Fenerbahce	
MF	Christian Karembeu	Middlesbrough	
FW	Samuel Eto'o	Mallorca	
GK	Albano Bizzarri	Real Valladolid	
FW	Edwin Congo	Toulouse	loan

==== Winter ====
In
Pos.	Name	from	Type

Out
Pos.	Name	To	Type
DF	Julio Cesar	AC Milan	loan
FW	Rolando Zárate	Real Murcia	loan

== Competitions ==
=== La Liga ===
==== Classification ====
Pos	Team	Pld	W	D	L	GF	GA	GD	Pts	Qualification or relegation
1	Real Madrid (C)	38	24	8	6	81	40	+41	80	Qualification for the Champions League group stage
2	Deportivo La Coruña	38	22	7	9	73	44	+29	73	Qualification for the Champions League group stage
3	Mallorca	38	20	11	7	61	43	+18	71	Qualification for the Champions League third qualifying round
4	Barcelona	38	17	12	9	80	57	+23	63 (Note: VAL 0–1 BAR; BAR 3–2 VAL)	Qualification for the Champions League third qualifying round
5	Valencia	38	18	9	11	55	34	+21	63	Qualification for the UEFA Cup first round

Source: LFP
Rules for classification: 1st points; 2nd head-to-head points; 3rd head-to-head goal difference; 4th head-to-head goals scored; 5th goal difference; 6th number of goals scored; 7th Fair-play points
(C) Champions

==== Results summary ====
Overall								Home						Away					
Pld	W	D	L	GF	GA	GD	Pts	W	D	L	GF	GA	GD	W	D	L	GF	GA	GD
38	24	8	6	81	40	+41	80	15	3	1	53	15	+38	9	5	5	28	25	+3

Source: LFP and La Liga 2000–01

==== Results by round ====
Round	1	2	3	4	5	6	7	8	9	10	11	12	13	14	15	16	17	18	19	20	21	22	23	24	25	26	27	28	29	30	31	32	33	34	35	36	37	38
Ground	H	A	H	A	H	A	A	H	A	H	A	H	A	H	A	H	A	H	A	A	H	A	H	A	H	H	A	H	A	H	A	H	A	H	A	H	A	H
Result	W	D	W	D	W	L	W	L	L	W	W	W	W	W	W	W	W	W	D	W	W	L	W	D	D	W	L	W	W	W	W	D	L	D	W	W	D	W
Position	7	5	3	5	1	4	2	3	7	3	3	3	2	1	1	1	1	1	1	1	1	1	1	1	1	1	1	1	1	1	1	1	1	1	1	1	1	1

Updated to match(es) played on 2008-07-16. Source: LFP.com
A = Away; H = Home; W = Win; D = Draw; L = Loss; = Leader, 2001-02 UEFA Champions League Group stage; = 2001-02 UEFA Champions League Group stage; = 2001-02 UEFA Champions League Qualifying round; = 2001-02 UEFA Cup; = 2001-02 Segunda Division

==== Matches ====
9 September 2000 1	Real Madrid	2–1	Valencia	Madrid
	Raúl 77'; Figo 85'		Mendieta 75' (pen.)	Stadium: Santiago Bernabéu; Attendance: 74,000; Referee: Arturo Daudén Ibáñez

16 September 2000 2	Málaga	3–3	Real Madrid	Málaga
	Dely Valdés 32'; Agostinho 47'; Movilla 57'		Raúl 16'; Celades 59'; Guti 80'	Stadium: La Rosaleda; Attendance: 23,000; Referee: Juan Fernández Marín

23 September 2000 3	Real Madrid	4–1	Athletic Bilbao	Madrid
	Guti 16', 47'; Roberto Carlos 35'; Munitis 65'		Ezquerro 90'	Stadium: Santiago Bernabéu; Attendance: 65,000; Referee: Fernando Carmona Méndez

30 September 2000 4	Racing Santander	0–0	Real Madrid	Santander
				Stadium: El Sardinero; Attendance: 15,000; Referee: Eduardo Iturralde González

14 October 2000 5	Real Madrid	3–0	Deportivo	Madrid
	Raúl 18'; Hierro 44' (pen.); Guti 87'			Stadium: Santiago Bernabéu; Attendance: 75,000; Referee: Javier Turienzo Álvarez

21 October 2000 6	Barcelona	2–0	Real Madrid	Barcelona
	Luis Enrique 26'; Simão 79'	Report		Stadium: Nou Camp; Attendance: 100,000; Referee: Alfonso Pérez Burrull

29 October 2000 7	Real Sociedad	1–4	Real Madrid	San Sebastián
	Jankauskas 77'		Guti 12'; Hierro 40' (pen.); Figo 46'; Sávio 61'	Stadium: Anoeta; Attendance: 25,000; Referee: Rafael Ramírez Domínguez

1 November 2000 8	Real Madrid	0–2	Mallorca	Madrid
			Ibagaza 54'; Carlitos 90'	Stadium: Santiago Bernabéu; Attendance: 67,410; Referee: Evaristo Puentes Leira

4 November 2000 9	Numancia	3–1	Real Madrid	Soria
	Roșu 6', 15', 64'		Raúl 14'	Stadium: Los Pajaritos; Attendance: 9,500; Referee: César Muñiz Fernández

12 November 2000 10	Real Madrid	5–1	Las Palmas	Madrid
	Hierro 6' (pen.), 48'; Guti 25'; Raúl 74'; Sávio 84'		Guayre 33'	Stadium: Santiago Bernabéu; Attendance: 60,000; Referee: Miguel Ángel Pérez Lasa

18 November 2000 11	Villarreal	0–1	Real Madrid	Villarreal
			Amor 67' (o.g.)	Stadium: El Madrigal; Attendance: 17,300; Referee: José Luis Prados García

2 December 2000 13	Osasuna	2–3	Real Madrid	Pamplona
	Arpón 18'; Campo 65' (o.g.)		Raúl 38'; Morientes 55'; Helguera 90'	Stadium: El Sadar; Attendance: 16,757; Referee: Antonio Jesús López Nieto

10 December 2000 14	Real Madrid	3–0	Celta Vigo	Madrid
	Helguera 11'; Figo 33'; Roberto Carlos 60'			Stadium: Santiago Bernabéu; Attendance: 60,124; Referee: Antonio Llonch Andreu

15 December 2000 15	Espanyol	1–2	Real Madrid	Barcelona
	Pochettino 21'		Morientes 4'; Figo 12'	Stadium: Estadi Olímpic de Montjuïc; Referee: Fernando Carmona Méndez

19 December 2000 16	Real Madrid	3–1	Rayo Vallecano	Madrid
	Figo 9'; Helguera 13'; Raúl 73'		Míchel 21'	Stadium: Santiago Bernabéu; Attendance: 50,000; Referee: Manuel Mejuto González

7 January 2001 17	Alavés	1–3	Real Madrid	Vitoria-Gasteiz
	Téllez 45'		Raúl 13'; Karmona 54' (o.g.); Guti 88'	Stadium: Mendizorrotza; Attendance: 17,109; Referee: Juan Ansuátegui Roca

14 January 2001 18	Real Madrid	4–0	Real Oviedo	Madrid
	Figo 15'; Morientes 56'; Munitis 70'; McManaman 87'			Stadium: Santiago Bernabéu; Attendance: 61,184; Referee: José Javier Losantos Omar

21 January 2001 19	Valladolid	2–2	Real Madrid	Valladolid
	Caminero 3'; Fernando 74' (pen.)		Roberto Carlos 44'; Morientes 52'	Stadium: José Zorrilla; Referee: José Ignacio Bueno Grimal

24 January 2001 12	Real Madrid	3–0	Real Zaragoza	Madrid
	Salgado 49'; Raúl 56'; Roberto Carlos 76'			Stadium: Santiago Bernabéu; Attendance: 50,000; Referee: Julián Rodríguez Santiago

28 January 2001 20	Valencia	0–1	Real Madrid	Valencia
			Raúl 82'	Stadium: Mestalla; Referee: Alberto Undiano Mallenco

4 February 2001 21	Real Madrid	4–3	Málaga	Madrid
	Guti 15'; Raúl 39', 42'; Helguera 75'		Roteta 24'; Dely Valdés 29'; Silva 73'	Stadium: Santiago Bernabéu; Attendance: 72,000; Referee: Antonio Llonch Andreu

10 February 2001 22	Athletic Bilbao	1–0	Real Madrid	Bilbao
	Alkiza 3'			Stadium: San Mamés; Attendance: 39,000; Referee: Juan Ansuátegui Roca

17 February 2001 23	Real Madrid	1–0	Racing Santander	Madrid
	Raúl 46'			Stadium: Santiago Bernabéu; Referee: Arturo Daudén Ibáñez

24 February 2001 24	Deportivo	2–2	Real Madrid	A Coruña
	Djalminha 47' (pen.); Tristán 85'		Hélder 6' (o.g.); Figo 44' (pen.)	Stadium: Riazor; Referee: José Manuel Andradas Asurmendi

3 March 2001 25	Real Madrid	2–2	Barcelona	Madrid
	Raúl 6', 36'	Report	Rivaldo 35', 69'	Stadium: Santiago Bernabéu; Attendance: 74,000; Referee: José Javier Losantos Omar

11 March 2001 26	Real Madrid	4–0	Real Sociedad	Madrid
	Morientes 13', 35'; Raúl 82'; McManaman 87'			Stadium: Santiago Bernabéu; Attendance: 66,143; Referee: Manuel Mejuto González

18 March 2001 27	Mallorca	1–0	Real Madrid	Mallorca
	Luque 38'			Stadium: Son Moix; Referee: Antonio Jesús López Nieto

31 March 2001 28	Real Madrid	1–0	Numancia	Madrid
	Figo 27'			Stadium: Santiago Bernabéu; Attendance: 70,000; Referee: Luis Medina Cantalejo

8 April 2001 29	Las Palmas	0–1	Real Madrid	Las Palmas
			Guti 57'	Stadium: Insular; Referee: Juan Ansuátegui Roca

15 April 2001 30	Real Madrid	4–0	Villarreal	Madrid
	Guti 20', 49', 58'; Roberto Carlos 53'			Stadium: Santiago Bernabéu; Attendance: 60,000; Referee: Rafael Ramírez Domínguez

22 April 2001 31	Real Zaragoza	2–3	Real Madrid	Zaragoza
	Juanele 26'; Jamelli 60'		Raúl 15', 32'; Sávio 66'	Stadium: La Romareda; Attendance: 32,000; Referee: Fernando Carmona Méndez

28 April 2001 32	Real Madrid	1–1	Osasuna	Madrid
	Raúl 50'		Fernández 36'	Stadium: Santiago Bernabéu; Attendance: 61,000; Referee: Javier Turienzo Álvarez

5 May 2001 33	Celta Vigo	3–0	Real Madrid	Vigo
	Juanfran 8'; López 24'; Jesuli 90'			Stadium: Estadio Balaídos; Attendance: 30,000; Referee: Juan Fernández Marín

13 May 2001 34	Real Madrid	2–2	Espanyol	Madrid
	Figo 24'; Raúl 46'		Rotchen 48'; Gâlcă 65' (pen.)	Stadium: Santiago Bernabéu; Attendance: 85,000; Referee: Alfonso Pérez Burrull

20 May 2001 35	Rayo Vallecano	0–1	Real Madrid	Puente de Vallecas, Madrid
			Guti 39'	Stadium: Campo de Fútbol de Vallecas; Attendance: 15,500; Referee: Arturo Daudén Ibáñez

26 May 2001 36	Real Madrid	5–0	Alavés	Madrid
	Raúl 22', 82'; Guti 23'; Hierro 51'; Helguera 67'			Stadium: Santiago Bernabéu; Attendance: 72,109; Referee: Julián Rodríguez Santiago

10 June 2001 37	Real Oviedo	1–1	Real Madrid	Oviedo
	Jaime 11'		Solari 26'	Stadium: Carlos Tartiere; Attendance: 16,000; Referee: José Javier Losantos Omar

17 June 2001 38	Real Madrid	2–1	Valladolid	Madrid
	Raúl 24', 85'		Kaviedes 77'	Stadium: Santiago Bernabéu; Attendance: 62,000; Referee: Eduardo Iturralde González

=== Copa del Rey ===
13 December 2000 Round of 64	Toledo	2–1	Real Madrid	Toledo
	González 5'; Cidoncha 14'		Sávio 19'	Stadium: Salto del Caballo; Attendance: 6,000; Referee: Javier Turienzo Álvarez

=== Champions League ===
==== First group stage ====
===== Group A =====
Pos	Team	Pld	W	D	L	GF	GA	GD	Pts	Qualification	RMA	SPM	LEV	SPO
1	(Spain) Real Madrid	6	4	1	1	15	8	+7	13	Advance to second group stage	—	1–0	5–3	4–0
2	(Russia) Spartak Moscow	6	4	0	2	9	3	+6	12	Advance to second group stage	1–0	—	2–0	3–1
3	(Germany) Bayer Leverkusen	6	2	1	3	9	12	−3	7	Transfer to UEFA Cup	2–3	1–0	—	3–2
4	(Portugal) Sporting CP	6	0	2	4	5	15	−10	2		2–2	0–3	0–0	—

Source: UEFA

12 September 2000 1	Sporting CP (Portugal)	2–2	(Spain) Real Madrid	Lisbon, Portugal
20:45	Sá Pinto 39'; André Cruz 42'	Report	Roberto Carlos 50'; Rui Jorge 76' (o.g.)	Stadium: Estádio José Alvalade; Attendance: 42,000; Referee: Alfredo Trentalange

20 September 2000 2	Real Madrid (Spain)	1–0	(Russia) Spartak Moscow	Madrid, Spain
20:45	Helguera 51'	Report		Stadium: Santiago Bernabéu; Attendance: 32,000; Referee: Leslie Irvine

27 September 2000 3	Bayer Leverkusen (Germany)	2–3	(Spain) Real Madrid	Leverkusen, Germany
20:45	Schneider 27'; Ballack 44'	Report	Roberto Carlos 32', 75'; Guti 69'	Stadium: BayArena; Attendance: 22,500; Referee: Karl-Erik Nilsson

17 October 2000 4	Real Madrid (Spain)	5–3	(Germany) Bayer Leverkusen	Madrid, Spain
20:45	Guti 4', 64'; Helguera 24'; Raúl 75'; Figo 87' (pen.)	Report	Brdarić 20'; Kirsten 55'; Rink 77'	Stadium: Santiago Bernabéu; Attendance: 60,000; Referee: Domenico Messina

25 October 2000 5	Real Madrid (Spain)	4–0	(Portugal) Sporting CP	Madrid, Spain
20:45	Guti 12'; Sávio 42'; Morientes 62', 70'	Report		Stadium: Santiago Bernabéu; Attendance: 55,029; Referee: Urs Meier

7 November 2000 6	Spartak Moscow (Russia)	1–0	(Spain) Real Madrid	Moscow, Russia
18:00	Geremi 47' (o.g.)	Report		Stadium: Luzhniki Stadium; Attendance: 80,000; Referee: Stéphane Bré

==== Second group stage ====
===== Group D =====
Pos	Team	Pld	W	D	L	GF	GA	GD	Pts	Qualification	RMA	LEE	AND	LAZ
1	(Spain) Real Madrid	6	4	1	1	14	9	+5	13	Advance to knockout stage	—	3–2	4–1	3–2
2	(England) Leeds United	6	3	1	2	12	10	+2	10	Advance to knockout stage	0–2	—	2–1	3–3
3	(Belgium) Anderlecht	6	2	0	4	7	12	−5	6		2–0	1–4	—	1–0
4	(Italy) Lazio	6	1	2	3	9	11	−2	5		2–2	0–1	2–1	—

Source: UEFA

22 November 2000 1	Leeds United (England)	0–2	Real Madrid (Spain)	Leeds, England
20:45		Report	Hierro 66'; Raúl 68'	Stadium: Elland Road; Attendance: 36,794; Referee: Dick Jol

5 December 2000 2	Real Madrid (Spain)	4–1	(Belgium) Anderlecht	Madrid, Spain
20:45	Morientes 12'; Figo 23' (pen.); Helguera 44'; Roberto Carlos 73'	Report	Stoica 89'	Stadium: Santiago Bernabéu; Attendance: 54,700; Referee: Hugh Dallas

13 February 2001 3	Lazio (Italy)	2–2	(Spain) Real Madrid	Rome, Italy
20:45	Nedvěd 4'; Crespo 53'	Report	Solari 32'; Raúl 73'	Stadium: Stadio Olimpico; Attendance: 48,000; Referee: Vítor Melo Pereira

21 February 2001 4	Real Madrid (Spain)	3–2	(Italy) Lazio	Madrid, Spain
20:45	Morientes 32'; Helguera 82'; Figo 89' (pen.)	Report	Crespo 4'; Gottardi 84'	Stadium: Santiago Bernabéu; Attendance: 72,000; Referee: Gilles Veissière

6 March 2001 5	Real Madrid (Spain)	3–2	(England) Leeds United	Madrid, Spain
20:45	Raúl 7', 60'; Figo 41'	Report	Smith 6'; Viduka 54'	Stadium: Santiago Bernabéu; Attendance: 40,000; Referee: Ryszard Wójcik

14 March 2001 6	Anderlecht (Belgium)	2–0	(Spain) Real Madrid	Brussels, Belgium
20:45	Dindane 85'; Goor 90+3'	Report		Stadium: Constant Vanden Stock Stadium; Attendance: 22,000; Referee: Alain Sars

==== Knockout stage ====
===== Quarter-finals =====
3 April 2001 1st leg	Galatasaray (Turkey)	3–2	(Spain) Real Madrid	Istanbul, Turkey
20:45	Ümit 47' (pen.); Hasan Şaş 66'; Jardel 75'	Report	Helguera 33'; Makélélé 43'	Stadium: Ali Sami Yen Stadium; Attendance: 28,000; Referee: Pierluigi Collina

18 April 2001 2nd leg	Real Madrid (Spain)	3–0 (5–3 agg.)	(Turkey) Galatasaray	Madrid, Spain
20:45	Raúl 15', 37'; Helguera 28'	Report		Stadium: Santiago Bernabéu; Attendance: 74,000; Referee: Anders Frisk

===== Semi-finals =====
1 May 2001 1st leg	Real Madrid (Spain)	0–1	(Germany) Bayern Munich	Madrid, Spain
20:45		Report	Élber 55'	Stadium: Santiago Bernabéu; Attendance: 74,112; Referee: Hugh Dallas

9 May 2001 2nd leg	Bayern Munich (Germany)	2–1 (3–1 agg.)	(Spain) Real Madrid	Munich, Germany
20:45	Élber 8'; Jeremies 34'	Report	Figo 18'	Stadium: Olympiastadion; Attendance: 62,500; Referee: Kim Milton Nielsen

=== UEFA Super Cup ===
25 August 2000 Final	Real Madrid (Spain)	1–2 (a.e.t.)	(Turkey) Galatasaray	Monaco
	Raúl 79' (pen.)	Report	Jardel 41' (pen.), 102'	Stadium: Stade Louis II; Attendance: 15,000; Referee: Günter Benkö

=== Intercontinental Cup ===
28 November 2000 Final	Real Madrid (Spain)	1–2	(Argentina) Boca Juniors	Tokyo, Japan
	Roberto Carlos 12'	Report	Palermo 3', 6'	Stadium: National Stadium; Attendance: 52,511; Referee: Óscar Ruiz

== Statistics ==
=== Players statistics ===
No.	Pos	Nat	Player	Total		La Liga		Copa del Rey		Champions League	
No.	Pos	Nat	Player	Apps	Goals	Apps	Goals	Apps	Goals	Apps	Goals
25	GK	(Spain) ESP	Iker Casillas	45	0	34	0	0	0	11	0
2	DF	(Spain) ESP	Míchel Salgado	38	1	26+1	1	0	0	11	0
18	DF	(Spain) ESP	Aitor Karanka	46	0	33+2	0	0	0	10+1	0
6	DF	(Spain) ESP	Iván Helguera	47	11	29+3	5	0+1	0	14	6
4	DF	(Spain) ESP	Fernando Hierro	42	6	28+1	5	1	0	11+1	1
3	DF	(Brazil) BRA	Roberto Carlos	50	9	36	5	0	0	14	4
8	MF	(England) ENG	Steve McManaman	39	2	22+6	2	0	0	9+2	0
24	MF	(France) FRA	Claude Makélélé	47	1	32+1	0	0	0	14	1
14	MF	(Spain) ESP	Guti	44	18	22+10	14	0	0	9+3	4
10	MF	(Portugal) POR	Luís Figo	48	14	33+1	9	0	0	14	5
7	FW	(Spain) ESP	Raúl	48	31	34+2	24	0	0	11+1	7
13	GK	(Spain) ESP	César	11	-13	4+1	-3	1	-2	5	-8
11	MF	(Brazil) BRA	Sávio	38	5	17+9	3	1	1	5+6	1
9	FW	(Spain) ESP	Fernando Morientes	31	10	13+9	6	1	0	6+2	4
15	MF	(Cameroon) CMR	Geremi	24	0	12+4	0	0	0	8	0
20	MF	(Spain) ESP	Albert Celades	27	1	10+7	1	1	0	4+5	0
17	FW	(Spain) ESP	Pedro Munitis	41	2	9+20	2	0	0	6+6	0
16	MF	(Brazil) BRA	Flávio Conceição	19	0	8+6	0	1	0	2+2	0
12	DF	(Spain) ESP	Iván Campo	16	0	8+2	0	1	0	4+1	0
21	MF	(Argentina) ARG	Santiago Solari	25	2	6+8	1	1	0	4+6	1
5	DF	(Spain) ESP	Manolo Sanchís	9	0	2+3	0	1	0	2+1	0
19	FW	(Spain) ESP	Tote	7	0	0+3	0	0+1	0	0+3	0
26	MF	(Spain) ESP	Alberto Rivera	6	0	0+2	0	1	0	2+1	0
36	DF	(Spain) ESP	Rubén	1	0	0	0	0	0	0+1	0
23	DF	(Brazil) BRA	Júlio César	1	0	0	0	0	0	0+1	0
34	DF	(Spain) ESP	Francisco Pavón	1	0	0	0	0	0	0+1	0
31	FW	(Spain) ESP	Óscar Miñambres	1	0	0	0	0+1	0		
33	DF	(Spain) ESP	Enrique Corrales	1	0	0	0	1	0		
29	MF	(Spain) ESP	Andrés Santos	0	0	0	0				
22	MF	(Spain) ESP	Álvaro Benito	0	0	0	0				
1	GK	(Germany) GER	Bodo Illgner	0	0	0	0				
27	GK	(Spain) ESP	Carlos Sánchez								
30	FW	(Spain) ESP	Sergio Sestelo								
37	MF	(Spain) ESP	Zafra								

- Source: https://www.bdfutbol.com/en/t/t2000-012.html
