= 2000–01 UD Las Palmas season =

UD Las Palmas
2000–01 season
- President: Manuel García Navarro
- Head coach: Sergije Krešić
- Stadium: Estadio Gran Canaria
- La Liga: 11th
- Copa del Rey: Round of 32
- Top goalscorer: League: Guayre (8); All: Guayre (8)

The 2000–01 season was UD Las Palmas's 52nd season in existence and the club's first season in the top flight of Spanish football since 1988. In addition to the domestic league, UD Las Palmas participated in this season's edition of the Copa del Rey. The season covers the period from 1 July 2000 to 30 June 2001.

== Competitions ==
=== Overview ===
Competition	First match	Last match	Starting round	Final position	Record							
Competition	First match	Last match	Starting round	Final position	Pld	W	D	L	GF	GA	GD	Win %
La Liga	10 September 2000	June 2001	Matchday 1	11th	38	13	7	18	42	62	−20	34.21
Copa del Rey	13 December 2000	3 January 2001	Round of 644	Round of 32	2	0	1	1	2	3	−1	0.00
Total					40	13	8	19	44	65	−21	32.50

Source: Competitions

=== La Liga ===
==== League table ====
Pos	Team	Pld	W	D	L	GF	GA	GD	Pts
9	Espanyol	38	15	7	16	46	44	+2	52
10	Alavés	38	14	7	17	58	59	−1	49
11	Las Palmas	38	13	7	18	42	62	−20	46
12	Athletic Bilbao	38	11	10	17	44	60	−16	43 (Note: ATH: 9 pts; RSO: 6 pts; RVA: 3 pts)
13	Real Sociedad	38	11	10	17	52	68	−16	43

Source: LFP
Rules for classification: 1st points; 2nd head-to-head points; 3rd head-to-head goal difference; 4th head-to-head goals scored; 5th goal difference; 6th number of goals scored; 7th Fair-play points

==== Results summary ====
Overall								Home						Away					
Pld	W	D	L	GF	GA	GD	Pts	W	D	L	GF	GA	GD	W	D	L	GF	GA	GD
38	13	7	18	42	62	−20	46	10	3	6	20	21	−1	3	4	12	22	41	−19

==== Results by round ====
Round	1	2	3	4	5	6	7	8	9	10	11	12	13	14	15	16	17	18	19	20	21	22	23	24	25	26	27	28	29	30	31	32	33	34	35	36	37	38
Ground	H	A	H	A	H	A	H	A	H	A	H	A	A	H	A	H	A	H	A	A	H	A	H	A	H	A	H	A	H	A	H	H	A	H	A	H	A	H
Result	L	D	D	L	W	W	W	L	L	L	W	W	D	L	L	W	W	W	D	L	W	L	L	L	D	L	W	L	L	L	D	W	L	W	D	L	L	W
Position																																						

A = Away; H = Home; W = Win; D = Draw; L = Loss

==== Matches ====
10 September 2000 1	Las Palmas	0–3	Alavés	Las Palmas
CEST (UTC+2)				Stadium: Estadio Gran Canaria

17 September 2000 2	Oviedo	2–2	Las Palmas	Oviedo
CEST (UTC+2)

23 September 2000 3	Las Palmas	1–1	Valladolid	Las Palmas
CEST (UTC+2)				Stadium: Estadio Gran Canaria

1 October 2000 4	Valencia	5–1	Las Palmas	Valencia
CEST (UTC+2)

14 October 2000 5	Las Palmas	2–1	Málaga	Las Palmas
CEST (UTC+2)				Stadium: Estadio Gran Canaria

22 October 2000 6	Athletic Bilbao	0–3	Las Palmas	Bilbao
CEST (UTC+2)

28 October 2000 7	Las Palmas	2–1	Racing Santander	Las Palmas
CEST (UTC+2)				Stadium: Estadio Gran Canaria

31 October 2000 8	Deportivo La Coruña	4–0	Las Palmas	A Coruña
CEST (UTC+2)

4 November 2000 9	Las Palmas	0–1	Barcelona	Las Palmas
CET (UTC+1)				Stadium: Estadio Gran Canaria

12 November 2000 10	Real Madrid	5–1	Las Palmas	Madrid
CET (UTC+1)

18 November 2000 11	Las Palmas	1–0	Mallorca	Las Palmas
CET (UTC+1)				Stadium: Estadio Gran Canaria

26 November 2000 12	Numancia	0–1	Las Palmas	Soria
CET (UTC+1)

3 December 2000 13	Real Sociedad	1–1	Las Palmas	San Sebastián
CET (UTC+1)

9 December 2000 14	Las Palmas	1–5	Villarreal	Las Palmas
CET (UTC+1)				Stadium: Estadio Gran Canaria

16 December 2000 15	Zaragoza	3–1	Las Palmas	Zaragoza
CET (UTC+1)

20 December 2000 16	Las Palmas	3–2	Osasuna	Las Palmas
CET (UTC+1)				Stadium: Estadio Gran Canaria

7 January 2001 17	Celta Vigo	0–1	Las Palmas	Vigo
CET (UTC+1)

14 January 2001 18	Las Palmas	1–0	Espanyol	Las Palmas
CET (UTC+1)				Stadium: Estadio Gran Canaria

21 January 2001 19	Rayo Vallecano	1–1	Las Palmas	Madrid
CET (UTC+1)

28 January 2001 20	Alavés	1–0	Las Palmas	Vitoria-Gasteiz
CET (UTC+1)

4 February 2001 21	Las Palmas	1–0	Oviedo	Las Palmas
CET (UTC+1)				Stadium: Estadio Gran Canaria

11 February 2001 22	Valladolid	1–0	Las Palmas	Valladolid
CET (UTC+1)

17 February 2001 23	Las Palmas	0–2	Valencia	Las Palmas
CET (UTC+1)				Stadium: Estadio Gran Canaria

25 February 2001 24	Málaga	2–1	Las Palmas	Málaga
CET (UTC+1)

4 March 2001 25	Las Palmas	0–0	Athletic Bilbao	Las Palmas
CET (UTC+1)				Stadium: Estadio Gran Canaria

11 March 2001 26	Racing Santander	2–1	Las Palmas	Santander
CET (UTC+1)

17 March 2001 27	Las Palmas	2–0	Deportivo La Coruña	Las Palmas
CET (UTC+1)				Stadium: Estadio Gran Canaria

1 April 2001 28	Barcelona	4–1	Las Palmas	Barcelona
CEST (UTC+2)

8 April 2001 29	Las Palmas	0–1	Real Madrid	Las Palmas
CEST (UTC+2)				Stadium: Estadio Gran Canaria

15 April 2001 30	Mallorca	2–1	Las Palmas	Palma
CEST (UTC+2)

22 April 2001 31	Las Palmas	1–1	Numancia	Las Palmas
CEST (UTC+2)				Stadium: Estadio Gran Canaria

29 April 2001 32	Las Palmas	2–1	Real Sociedad	Las Palmas
CEST (UTC+2)				Stadium: Estadio Gran Canaria

6 May 2001 33	Villarreal	2–1	Las Palmas	Villarreal
CEST (UTC+2)

13 May 2001 34	Las Palmas	2–1	Zaragoza	Las Palmas
CEST (UTC+2)				Stadium: Estadio Gran Canaria

20 May 2001 35	Osasuna	3–3	Las Palmas	Pamplona
CEST (UTC+2)

26 May 2001 36	Las Palmas	0–1	Celta Vigo	Las Palmas
CEST (UTC+2)				Stadium: Estadio Gran Canaria

10 June 2001 37	Espanyol	3–2	Las Palmas	Barcelona
CEST (UTC+2)

16 June 2001 38	Las Palmas	1–0	Rayo Vallecano	Las Palmas
CEST (UTC+2)				Stadium: Estadio Gran Canaria

=== Copa del Rey ===
13 December 2000 Round of 64	Sporting Gijón	1–1 (a.e.t.) (4–5 p)	Las Palmas	Gijón
CEST (UTC+2)				Stadium: El Molinón

3 January 2001 Round of 32	Gimnástica de Torrelavega	2–1	Las Palmas	Torrelavega
CET (UTC+1)				Stadium: El Malecón
