= Nino (footballer, born 1980) =

Spanish footballer

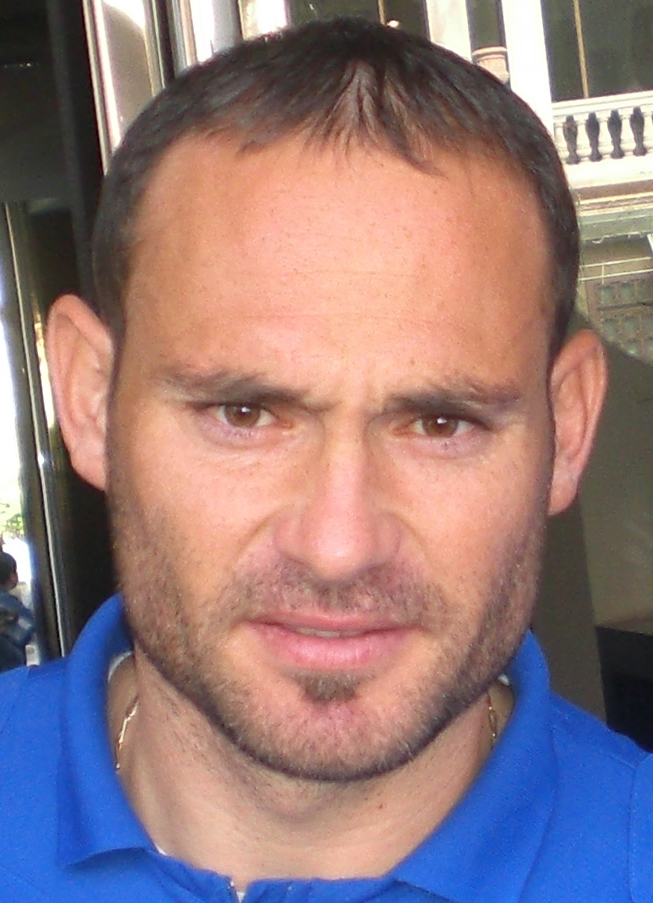
- Nino with Tenerife in 2010

Personal information
- Full name: Juan Francisco Martínez Modesto
- Date of birth: 10 June 1980 (age 46)
- Place of birth: Vera, Spain
- Height: 1.69 m (5 ft 7 in)
- Position: Striker

Youth career
- Vera
- 1995–1997: Real Madrid

Senior career*
Years	Team	Apps	(Gls)
1997–1998	Elche B		
1998–2006	Elche	273	(88)
2006–2008	Levante	19	(1)
2007–2008	→ Tenerife (loan)	40	(18)
2008–2011	Tenerife	119	(60)
2011–2016	Osasuna	143	(27)
2016–2021	Elche	170	(38)
Total		764	(232)

Managerial career
- 2021–2025: Elche B (assistant)
- * Club domestic league appearances and goals

Juan Francisco Martínez Modesto (born 10 June 1980), known as Nino, is a Spanish former professional footballer who played as a striker.

He totalled the most matches and goals in the history of both the Segunda División, with 571 and 194, and of Elche, at 461 appearances and 135 goals. In La Liga, he represented Levante, Tenerife, Osasuna and Elche, becoming the first player to reach 700 games in Spain's two highest divisions.

== Club career ==
=== Elche ===
An extremely prolific goalscorer in the Segunda División, Nino was born in Vera, Province of Almería, and first appeared professionally with Elche CF, making his debut on 8 November 1998 in a 3–0 win over Real Murcia CF. In his first season with the club, 1998–99, he achieved promotion from Segunda División B, scoring a crucial last-minute goal against UD Melilla on 27 June.

In the following campaign, Nino made his debut in the second division against Recreativo de Huelva, and eventually scored twice in 16 matches, going on to develop as an influential figure for the Province of Alicante team. He consolidated as a starter under the command of Jorge D'Alessandro, who gave him the nickname "bulldog".

In 2000–01, Nino appeared in 40 out of 42 fixtures, including the first 34 consecutively, as a starter, finishing the season with 12 goals. He then scored Elche's first goal of 2001–02, against Levante UD. His first brace arrived on 18 November 2001 in the 2–1 away win over Gimnàstic de Tarragona, and his first hat-trick came on 17 March 2002 as the hosts defeated Xerez CD 4–0. Two weeks later, his two goals helped to beat the Luis Aragonés-led Atlético Madrid in a historic 5–1 victory at the Estadio Martínez Valero.

=== Levante ===
After having scored 20 goals during 2004–05, Nino made his La Liga debut two seasons later, joining neighbours Levante. However, he would only find the net once throughout the entire campaign, in a 2–1 loss at CA Osasuna on 20 December 2006, but the Valencians managed to avoid relegation after finishing in 15th position.

=== Tenerife ===
Nino returned to the second tier in 2007–08, loaned to CD Tenerife, and finished with 18 goals, second-best in the league behind Xerez's Yordi. The move was made permanent afterwards, on a three-year deal.

In 2008–09, Nino was finally crowned the second division's top scorer at 29 goals and Tenerife returned to the top flight after a seven-year hiatus. In the next season, he was again their main attacking reference: on 18 April 2010 he scored three times at home against Getafe CF (3–2), totalling 14 but suffering relegation. He bettered to 17 the following campaign, but the Canary Islands side dropped down another league.

=== Osasuna ===
Nino rejoined the top flight in early July 2011, with the 31-year-old signing a 2+1 contract with Osasuna. He scored in only his second official game, a 2–1 home win over Sporting de Gijón.

=== Return to Elche ===
On 19 August 2016, after the Navarrese were promoted back to the main division, Nino remained in the second one with Elche, rejoining the club a decade after leaving. He scored 12 times in his first season of his second spell, including two in a 4–4 draw with Gimnàstic on 8 October, but his team was eventually relegated.

Nino ignored offers from division two and while the majority of the squad left, the captain decided to stay along with vice-captain Edu Albácar in order to see them promote again. A controversy regarding his possible departure in the winter transfer window due to friction with coach Josico raised doubts in the board and threatened their season, but the support of fans and goals in Badalona put them back on track.

On 4 June 2018, the new president of the Royal Spanish Football Federation, Luis Rubiales, visited the Martínez Valero before an international match against Croatia; the chairman, who had played with Nino at Levante, asked to meet him again to "give him a hug". Six days later, on the day of his 38th birthday, he scored a vital goal in the fight for promotion, entering the field 1–0 down and equalising the game against Sporting Atlético. He totalled 46 competitive appearances and scored 16 times, including four in the playoffs, three of them against Sporting B. After the promotion, he was appointed town crier of the Elche festivities, delivering his speech on 8 August 2018 from the balcony of the city hall in front of a crowded Plaza de Baix.

On 1 December 2019, the 39-year-old Nino scored in a 2–0 victory over Racing de Santander with a long-range shot; this was his 130th goal for Elche, thus equaling Pierita as the club's all-time scorer, but he would only find the net away from home from that point on. On 9 February 2020, his late brace salvaged a 2–2 draw at CD Lugo to make him the solo leader.

Nino started against Extremadura UD on 12 June 2020, thus becoming the first-ever player in the history of the club to play a match after turning 40. In the next fixture he scored in a 2–1 loss away to SD Ponferradina, and in doing so at the age of 40 years and 5 days, he became the first in the history of the second tier to achieve this feat after his 40th birthday. On 16 August, he scored the only goal of the play-off semi-final tie against Real Zaragoza, and his team eventually beat Girona FC 1–0 on aggregate to secure promotion.

On 26 September 2020, Nino finally fulfilled his dream of playing with Elche in the main division, replacing the injured Cifu in the 31st minute of the 0–3 home loss to Real Sociedad. Following the retirement of Cádiz CF's Alberto Cifuentes in October, he was now the oldest player in the competition.

On 16 December 2020, Nino scored his last goal for the side, a 70th-minute equaliser in an eventual 2–1 victory over amateurs CD Buñol in the first round of the Copa del Rey, and in doing so at the age of 40 years and 189 days, he became the oldest scorer in the tournament's history, breaking the previous record held by César Rodríguez since 1960 (39 years and 330 days) while also being the first to do this after turning 40; however, he only held the distinction until November 2022, being surpassed by Jorge Molina. On 3 January 2021, he took the field in the 1–0 away loss against Athletic Bilbao, thus becoming the first player to reach 700 games in Spain's two professional levels.

Nino played his last minutes as a professional against Athletic Bilbao on 22 May 2021, at the age of 40 years and 346 days, being the fifth oldest player in history to appear in the top flight behind Harry Lowe, Ricardo, Cifuentes and Amedeo Carboni. He only started three times during the campaign, all in the cup, and played 16 league matches, always as a substitute and in most cases with the result decided, totalling just 277 minutes; he was thus unable to break Donato's mark of being the top tier's oldest scorer at 40 years and 138 days.

On 9 June 2021, Nino announced his retirement; no other footballer equaled his record of scoring in 23 successive seasons, and with over 300 goals in the Spanish football league system he ranked among the top ten highest scorers alongside the likes of Rodríguez, Hugo Sánchez, David Villa, Raúl, Cristiano Ronaldo and Lionel Messi. On 2 September, he was named assistant manager of René Martínez at his last club's reserves.

== Career statistics ==
Appearances and goals by club, season and competition
Club	Season	League			Cup		Continental		Other		Total	
Club	Season	Division	Apps	Goals	Apps	Goals	Apps	Goals	Apps	Goals	Apps	Goals
Elche	1998–99	Segunda División B	17	2	0	0	—		4 (Note: Appearances in the 1999 Segunda División B play-offs)	1	21	3
Elche	1999–00	Segunda División	16	2	1	0	—		—		17	2
Elche	2000–01	Segunda División	40	12	1	0	—		—		41	12
Elche	2001–02	Segunda División	42	17	1	0	—		—		43	17
Elche	2002–03	Segunda División	41	10	1	0	—		—		42	10
Elche	2003–04	Segunda División	34	12	1	1	—		—		35	13
Elche	2004–05	Segunda División	41	20	3	0	—		—		44	20
Elche	2005–06	Segunda División	42	13	0	0	—		—		42	13
Elche	Total		273	88	8	1	—		4	1	285	90
Levante	2006–07	La Liga	19	1	1	1	—		—		20	2
Tenerife	2007–08	Segunda División	40	18	0	0	—		—		40	18
Tenerife	2008–09	Segunda División	42	29	1	0	—		—		43	29
Tenerife	2009–10	La Liga	38	14	2	0	—		—		40	14
Tenerife	2010–11	Segunda División	39	17	1	1	—		—		40	18
Tenerife	Total		159	78	4	1	—		—		163	79
Osasuna	2011–12	La Liga	36	6	0	0	—		—		36	6
Osasuna	2012–13	La Liga	25	3	1	0	—		—		26	3
Osasuna	2013–14	La Liga	4	0	0	0	—		—		4	0
Osasuna	2014–15	Segunda División	41	11	0	0	—		—		41	11
Osasuna	2015–16	Segunda División	37	7	0	0	—		3 (Note: Appearances in the 2016 Segunda División play-offs)	0	40	7
Osasuna	Total		143	27	1	0	—		3	0	147	27
Elche	2016–17	Segunda División	39	12	2	1	—		—		41	13
Elche	2017–18	Segunda División B	38	12	2	0	—		6 (Note: Appearances in the 2018 Segunda División B play-offs)	4	46	16
Elche	2018–19	Segunda División	37	7	1	0	—		—		38	7
Elche	2019–20	Segunda División	40	7	2	0	—		4 (Note: Appearances in the 2020 Segunda División play-offs)	1	46	8
Elche	2020–21	La Liga	16	0	3	1	—		—		19	1
Elche	Total		170	38	10	2	—		10	5	190	45
Career total			764	232	24	5	0	0	17	6	805	243

== Honours ==
Individual

- Pichichi Trophy (Segunda División): 2008–09
- Zarra Trophy (Segunda División): 2008–09
