= Carazo =

Carazo may refer to:

- Carazo (surname)
- Carazo (department), Nicaragua
- Carazo, Province of Burgos, a municipality in Castile and León, Spain
