= CD Linares =

Spanish association football club

Linares
- Full name: Club Deportivo Linares
- Nickname(s): Azulillos (Little Blues)
- Founded: 1990
- Dissolved: 2009 (19 years)
- Ground: Linarejos, Linares, Andalusia, Spain
- Capacity: 10,000
- President: Julio Peralta
- Head coach: Manuel Tomé
- League: 2ªB - Group 4
- 2008–09: 2ªB - Group 4, 14th
| Home colours | Away colours |

Club Deportivo Linares was a Spanish football team based in Linares, Jaén, in the autonomous community of Andalusia. Founded in 1990 and dissolved in July 2009, it played its last season in 2008–09, in Second Division B - Group 4. The team's stadium was Estadio de Linarejos, with a capacity of 10,000 seats.

== History ==
Club Deportivo Linares was founded in 1990 with Miguel Hernández as its first president, first reaching the fourth division four years later, with a brief spell in the third level in 2000–01 – immediate relegation back.

On 21 July 2009, after seven consecutive seasons in Segunda B, the mayor of Linares, Juan Fernández, announced the club's defunction, due to the impossibility of paying its debt (around €4.7 million). It managed to play another seven seasons in division three.

On 5 August, Linares' new managing board confirmed the registration in the fourth category but, eventually, the Royal Spanish Football Federation forced the team to disappear.

=== Club background ===
- SG Linarense – (1909–20)
- Linares FC – (1920–29)
- Gimnástica Linarense – (1929–31)
- Linares Deportivo (I) – (1940–46)
- Atlético Linares – (1946–48)
- CD Linares (I) – (1952–64)
- Linares CF – (1961–90)
- CD Linares (II) – (1990–2009)
- Linares Deportivo (II) – (2009–present)

== Season to season ==
| Season | Tier | Division | Place | Copa del Rey |
|---|---|---|---|---|
| 1990–91 | 6 | 1ª Reg. | 1st | |
| 1991–92 | 5 | Reg. Pref. | 2nd | |
| 1992–93 | 5 | Reg. Pref. | 3rd | |
| 1993–94 | 5 | Reg. Pref. | 2nd | |
| 1994–95 | 4 | 3ª | 5th | |
| 1995–96 | 4 | 3ª | 5th | |
| 1996–97 | 4 | 3ª | 3rd | |
| 1997–98 | 4 | 3ª | 1st | |
| 1998–99 | 4 | 3ª | 5th | |
| 1999–2000 | 4 | 3ª | 2nd | |

| Season | Tier | Division | Place | Copa del Rey |
|---|---|---|---|---|
| 2000–01 | 3 | 2ª B | 18th | |
| 2001–02 | 4 | 3ª | 1st | |
| 2002–03 | 3 | 2ª B | 16th | Round of 16 |
| 2003–04 | 3 | 2ª B | 11th | |
| 2004–05 | 3 | 2ª B | 11th | |
| 2005–06 | 3 | 2ª B | 4th | |
| 2006–07 | 3 | 2ª B | 2nd | Third round |
| 2007–08 | 3 | 2ª B | 2nd | First round |
| 2008–09 | 3 | 2ª B | 14th | First round |

- 8 seasons in Segunda División B
- 7 seasons in Tercera División
- 4 seasons in Categorías Regionales

== Last squad ==
Note: Flags indicate national team as defined under FIFA eligibility rules; some limited exceptions apply. Players may hold more than one non-FIFA nationality.

| No. | Pos. | Nation | Player |
|---|---|---|---|
| — | GK | (Spain) ESP | Joaquín Moso |
| — | GK | (Spain) ESP | Diego Arroyo |
| — | GK | (Spain) ESP | Manu |
| — | DF | (Spain) ESP | Chico |
| — | DF | (Spain) ESP | Castellano |
| — | DF | (Spain) ESP | José Cidoncha |
| — | DF | (Spain) ESP | Rafael Santacruz |
| — | DF | (Spain) ESP | Miguel Ángel |
| — | DF | (Spain) ESP | Juanan |
| — | DF | (Spain) ESP | Alberto Iván |
| — | MF | (Spain) ESP | Antonio Vera |

| No. | Pos. | Nation | Player |
|---|---|---|---|
| — | MF | (Spain) ESP | Dani Bouzas |
| — | MF | (Spain) ESP | Montiel |
| — | MF | (Spain) ESP | Pedro Díaz |
| — | MF | (Spain) ESP | David Fernández |
| — | MF | (Spain) ESP | Sergio Sestelo |
| — | MF | (Spain) ESP | Joaquín |
| — | FW | (Spain) ESP | José Manuel |
| — | FW | (Argentina) ARG | Fede |
| — | FW | (Spain) ESP | Ángel |
| — | FW | (Spain) ESP | Fran Moreno |

== Famous players ==
- (Argentina) Iván Fassione
- (Argentina) Luciano Álvarez
- (Argentina) Juan Cobián
- (Argentina) Gabriel Bordi
- (Argentina) Martín Tártara
- (Argentina) Bruno Calabria
- (Equatorial Guinea) (Spain) Natanael Borengue
- (France) Mohamed Diamé
- (Ghana) Owusu Afriyie
- (Saint Kitts and Nevis) Atiba Harris
- (Spain) Pedro Largo
- (Spain) Imanol Idiakez
- (Spain) Chico
- (Spain) Pérez Hurtado
- (Spain) (Brazil) Catanha
- (United Arab Emirates) Tariq Spezie
