= Rafa Santacruz =

Association football player

Personal information
- Full name: Rafael Carlos Santacruz Aragonés
- Date of birth: 27 January 1983 (age 43)
- Place of birth: Córdoba, Spain
- Height: 1.77 m (5 ft 10 in)
- Position: Centre-back

Youth career
- Valladolid

Senior career*
Years	Team	Apps	(Gls)
2003–2004	Valladolid B		
2004–2005	Valencia B	25	(2)
2005	Valencia	1	(0)
2005–2006	Real Madrid C	30	(9)
2006–2007	Real Madrid B	17	(0)
2007–2008	Ceuta	29	(1)
2008–2009	Linares	32	(4)
2009–2010	Conquense	28	(3)
2010–2011	Albacete	0	(0)
2011	Hospitalet	11	(0)
2011–2012	Puertollano	20	(3)
2012–2013	Pozoblanco	22	(3)
2013–2015	Lucena	62	(2)
2015–2016	Ciudad Lucena	22	(6)
2016–2017	Pozoblanco	33	(3)
2017–2019	Atlético Porcuna	58	(9)
2019–2021	Pozoblanco	40	(7)
2021–2024	Atlético Espeleño	70	(9)

International career
1999	Spain U16	1	(0)
- * Club domestic league appearances and goals as of 12 May 2024

Rafael "Rafa" Carlos Santacruz Aragonés (born 27 January 1983) is a Spanish footballer who plays as a central defender.

== Club career ==
Santacruz was born in Córdoba, Andalusia. After starting out at Real Valladolid Promesas, he joined Valencia CF's reserves. On 10 April 2005, he made his only La Liga appearance with the latter's first team, playing the full 90 minutes in a 2–2 home draw against Málaga CF.

Subsequently, Santacruz spent one season apiece with Real Madrid's C and B sides, suffering relegation from Segunda División with the latter in 2007. After that, he returned to Segunda División B and represented in quick succession AD Ceuta, CD Linares and UB Conquense.

In the summer of 2010, the 27-year-old Santacruz went back to division two, signing for Albacete Balompié. In the following transfer window, however, he left without one single official appearance and resumed his career in the third tier. He retired already in his 40s, having competed in the Tercera División and the Andalusian regional leagues.
