= Torredonjimeno CF =

Spanish football club

Torredonjimeno
- Full name: Torredonjimeno Club de Fútbol
- Founded: 1940
- Dissolved: 2009
- Ground: Matías Prats, Torredonjimeno, Andalusia, Spain
- Capacity: 4,500
- 2008–09: Primera Andaluza, withdrew
Home colours	Away colours

Torredonjimeno Club de Fútbol was a Spanish football team based in Torredonjimeno, in the autonomous community of Andalusia. Founded in 1940 and dissolved in 2009, it held home games at Estadio Matías Prats, which held 4,500 spectators.

== History ==
Torredonjimeno was founded in 1940, first reaching the national categories (Tercera División) 58 years later, and remaining in the category for four seasons. In 2001–02 it promoted for the first time ever to Segunda División B, being immediately relegated back.

At the end of 2007–08, after ranking 20th and last in its group, Torredonjimeno returned to Primera Andaluza. In January 2009, after failing to report to two consecutive games, the team was disqualified from the competition and folded. Subsequently, a new team called UD Ciudad de Torredonjimeno was founded as the club's replacement.

== Season to season ==
Season	Tier	Division	Place	Copa del Rey
1940–1967	—	Regional	—	
1967–68	5	1ª Reg.	1st	
1968–69	5	1ª Reg.	3rd	
1969–70	5	1ª Reg.	4th	
1970–71	5	1ª Reg.	6th	
1971–72	5	1ª Reg.	7th	
1972–73	5	1ª Reg.	9th	
1973–74	5	1ª Reg.	13th	
1974–75	5	1ª Reg.	17th	
1975–76	5	1ª Reg.	12th	
1976–77	5	1ª Reg.	7th	
1977–78	5	Reg. Pref.	13th	
1978–79	5	Reg. Pref.	19th	
1979–80	6	1ª Reg.	22nd	
1980–81	6	1ª Reg.	5th	
1981–82	5	Reg. Pref.	3rd	
1982–83	5	Reg. Pref.	16th	
1983–84	5	Reg. Pref.	7th	
1984–85	6	1ª Reg.	2nd	
1985–86	6	1ª Reg.	1st	

Season	Tier	Division	Place	Copa del Rey
1986–87	5	Reg. Pref.	5th	
1987–88	5	Reg. Pref.	3rd	
1988–89	5	Reg. Pref.	6th	
1989–90	5	Reg. Pref.	3rd	
1990–91	5	Reg. Pref.	1st	
1991–92	5	Reg. Pref.	1st	
1992–93	5	Reg. Pref.	2nd	
1993–94	5	Reg. Pref.	6th	
1994–95	5	Reg. Pref.	5th	
1995–96	5	Reg. Pref.	9th	
1996–97	5	Reg. Pref.	3rd	
1997–98	5	Reg. Pref.	1st	
1998–99	4	3ª	9th	
1999–2000	4	3ª	5th	
2000–01	4	3ª	3rd	
2001–02	4	3ª	3rd	
2002–03	3	2ª B	19th	
2003–04	4	3ª	13th	
2004–05	4	3ª	2nd	
2005–06	4	3ª	5th	

Season	Tier	Division	Place	Copa del Rey
2006–07	4	3ª	14th	
2007–08	4	3ª	20th	
2008–09	5	1ª And.	(R)	

- 1 season in Segunda División B
- 9 seasons in Tercera División

== Famous players ==
- (Angola) Rui Mendes
- (Algeria) Selim Kaabi
- (Argentina) Darío Delgado
- (Argentina) Iván Fassione
- (France) Sofian Allali
- (France) Touré Moumine
- (France) Aboubacar Sankharé
- (Latvia) Sergejs Misins
- (Martinique) Freddy Clément
- (Senegal) Ahmadou N'Diaye
- (Senegal) Mohamed Talibe
- (Spain) Daniel Olsson
- (Tunisia) Mehdi Tagawa
