= Antonio Vera =

Spanish footballer

Personal information
- Full name: Antonio Vera Moreno
- Date of birth: 11 October 1986 (age 40)
- Place of birth: Seville, Spain
- Height: 1.79 m (5 ft 10 1/2 in)
- Position: Midfielder

Youth career
- Sevilla

Senior career*
Years	Team	Apps	(Gls)
2005–2008	Sevilla B	13	(0)
2006–2007	→ Mérida (loan)	14	(0)
2008–2009	Linares	6	(0)
2009–2010	Betis C		
2010–2011	Brenes Balompié		
2011	Alcalá	11	(0)
2011–2012	Plasencia		
2012–2013	La Hoya Lorca		
- * Club domestic league appearances and goals

Antonio Vera Moreno (born 11 October 1986 in Seville, Andalusia) is a Spanish former footballer who played as a midfielder.
