= Freddy Clément =

Martiniquais association football player (born 1978)

Personal information
- Full name: Frédéric Clément
- Date of birth: 28 July 1978 (age 48)
- Place of birth: Martinique
- Position: Midfielder

Senior career*
Years	Team	Apps	(Gls)
-2003	Stade Lavallois	8	(0)
2003/2004	Wasquehal Football		
2004/2005	R.F.C. Tournai		
- Saint-Denis FC
2007–2008	Torredonjimeno CF	16	(3)
- NK Jedinstvo Bihać
-2015	Aiglon du Lamentin FC		
2015/2016	AS New Club		
2016–2017	RC Rivière-Pilote		
2017–2018	AS Samaritaine		

International career
2002–2004	Martinique	4	(0)
- * Club domestic league appearances and goals

Frédéric Clément (born 28 July 1978) is a Martiniquais retired footballer.

== Career ==
At the age of 23, Clément left Martinique for French second division side Stade Lavallois, leaving at the end of 2002/03 due to head coach Victor Zvunka's departure. After that, he played for Wasquehal Football in the French lower leagues as well as Belgian third division team R.F.C. Tournai, before joining Saint-Denis in Reunion.

In 2007, he signed for Spanish fourth division outfit Torredonjimeno CF. From there, Clément signed for NK Jedinstvo Bihać in the Bosnian second division. Following NK Jedinstvo Bihać, he played returned to Martinique with Aiglon du Lamentin.
