= Gabriel Bordi =

Argentine footballer (born 1975)

Personal information
- Full name: Gabriel Miguel Bordi
- Date of birth: 5 July 1975 (age 51)
- Place of birth: Argentina
- Height: 1.82 m (6 ft 0 in)
- Position: Striker

Senior career*
Years	Team	Apps	(Gls)
1994–1996	Racing de Córdoba		
1996–1997	Instituto	9	(1)
1997–1999	All Boys	73	(38)
1999–2000	Napoli	2	(0)
2000–2001	Quilmes		
2001	Defensor Sporting	15	(4)
2002	Poli Ejido	17	(4)
2002–2003	Braga	22	(2)
2003–2006	Linares	82	(18)
2006–2008	Granada	52	(14)
2009–2009	Granada 74	17	(2)
2009–2010	Baza		
2010–2012	Racing de Córdoba	26	(2)
- * Club domestic league appearances and goals

Gabriel Miguel Bordi (born 5 July 1975) is an Argentine former footballer who last played as a striker for Racing de Córdoba.

== Early life ==
Bordi was born in 1975 in Córdoba, Argentina.

== Playing career ==
Bordi was nicknamed "El Tanque". He started his career with Argentine side Racing de Córdoba. In 1997, he signed for Argentine side All Boys, where he was top scorer of the league with twenty-two goals. He has been regarded as one of the club's worst signings during the late 1990s to early 2000s. In 2000, he signed for Argentine side Quilmes on a free transfer, which generated controversy from Argentine side All Boys, who wanted a fee. In 2002, he signed for Portuguese side Braga. In 2006, he signed for Spanish side Granada.

== Style of play ==
Bordi mainly operated as a striker and was known for his strength.

== Post-playing career ==
After retiring from professional football, Bordi worked as a manager.

== Personal life ==
Bordi is of Italian descent.
