= Carazo (surname) =

Carazo is a Spanish surname. Notable people with the surname include:

- Evaristo Carazo (1821–1889), President of Nicaragua
- Juan Carazo (born 1964), Puerto Rican former boxer
- Pedro Largo Carazo (born 1972), Spanish football defender
- Rodrigo Carazo Odio (1926–2009), President of Costa Rica
