= Fran Moreno =

Spanish footballer

Personal information
- Full name: Francisco Javier Moreno Jiménez
- Date of birth: 7 May 1984 (age 42)
- Place of birth: Pamplona, Spain
- Height: 1.87 m (6 ft 1 1/2 in)
- Position: Attacking midfielder

Youth career
- Osasuna

Senior career*
Years	Team	Apps	(Gls)
2001–2005	Osasuna B	51	(4)
2005–2008	Osasuna	7	(0)
2006–2007	→ Numancia (loan)	26	(2)
2007–2008	→ Albacete (loan)	22	(1)
2008–2009	Linares	29	(4)
2009–2010	Alavés	13	(1)
2010	Ontinyent	14	(3)
2010	Alcoyano	14	(0)
2011	Ontinyent	15	(2)
2011–2012	Olímpic Xàtiva	31	(3)
2012–2013	Ontinyent	38	(13)
2013–2015	Leganés	54	(9)
2015–2016	Murcia	22	(4)
2016–2017	Lleida Esportiu	21	(5)
2017–2018	Jumilla	50	(11)
2018–2020	La Nucía	63	(12)
2020–2021	Racing Murcia	26	(1)
2021–2022	Mar Menor	31	(0)
Total		527	(75)
- * Club domestic league appearances and goals

Francisco Javier 'Fran' Moreno Jiménez (born 7 May 1984) is a Spanish former professional footballer who played as an attacking midfielder.

== Club career ==
Born in Pamplona, Navarre, Moreno appeared seven times for his local club CA Osasuna in the 2005–06 season, as they tied a best-ever fourth place in La Liga (no games complete, two starts). He made his debut in the competition on 18 September 2005, playing 22 minutes in a 1–0 home win against Sevilla FC.

After two Segunda División loans, at CD Numancia and Albacete Balompié, Moreno was released in 2008, resuming his career in the Segunda División B, first with lowly CD Linares. He only returned to the second tier in 2014–15, contributing 19 appearances as CD Leganés retained their league status and being released at the end of the campaign.

Moreno continued to compete in the lower leagues until his retirement, representing a host of teams before his retirement in July 2022 aged 38.
