= Iván Fassione =

Argentine professional footballer

Personal information
- Full name: Iván Rodrigo Fassione Gómez
- Date of birth: 27 December 1983 (age 42)
- Place of birth: Isidro Casanova, Argentina
- Height: 1.75 m (5 ft 9 in)
- Position: Defender

Team information
- Current team: Cañuelas

Youth career
- Almirante Brown
- San Lorenzo

Senior career*
| Years | Team | Apps | (Gls) |
| 2005 | San Lorenzo | 0 | (0) |
| 2005 | → Linares (loan) | 6 | (0) |
| 2006 | Sabadell | 5 | (0) |
| 2006–2007 | Torredonjimeno | 31 | (1) |
| 2007–2008 | Alcalá | 19 | (0) |
| 2008–2009 | Jerez | 32 | (1) |
| 2010–2011 | Gimnasia y Esgrima | 47 | (2) |
| 2011–2012 | Deportivo Laferrere | 18 | (0) |
| 2012–2013 | Boca Río Gallegos | 10 | (0) |
| 2013–2014 | Sportivo Italiano | 1 | (0) |
| 2014 | Brown | 0 | (0) |
| 2015–2019 | Almirante Brown | 53 | (0) |
| 2019– | Cañuelas | 23 | (0) |
- * Club domestic league appearances and goals as of 01:23, 5 September 2020 (UTC)

Iván Rodrigo Fassione Gómez (born 27 December 1983) is an Argentine professional footballer who plays as a defender for Cañuelas.

== Career ==
Fassione played for Almirante Brown's youth, before signing for San Lorenzo's academy. In early 2005, Fassione was loaned to Linares of Spain's Segunda División B. He made his bow in a 1–0 win over Arenas on 6 February, with a further five appearances following in 2004–05 as they placed eleventh in Group IV. Fassione returned to San Lorenzo in June 2005, though was subsequently released. Fassione went back to Spanish football in 2006, signing with third tier team Sabadell - via a trial with Villanueva. He was sent off in his second match versus Osasuna B, on the way to five appearances as they suffered relegation.

Fassione spent the subsequent 2006–07 Tercera División campaign with Torredonjimeno. One goal in thirty-one games occurred. A return to the country's third tier was completed in 2007, as he agreed terms with Alcalá. Having been relegated with the Alcalá de Guadaíra outfit, Fassione made a move to Jerez in 2008. He netted once for the club throughout the 2008–09 campaign. 2010 saw Fassione return to his homeland with Torneo Argentino A's Gimnasia y Esgrima. Subsequent stints with Deportivo Laferrere, Boca Río Gallegos and Sportivo Italiano came from 2011. Fassione had a spell with Brown to end 2014.

In January 2015, Fassione joined Primera B Metropolitana side Almirante Brown. Fifty-two appearances then arrived in all competitions across his opening four campaigns. After four years there, Fassione left in July 2019 to Primera C Metropolitana's Cañuelas.

== Career statistics ==
As of 5 September 2020.

Appearances and goals by club, season and competition
| Club | Season | League | | | Cup | | League Cup | | Continental | | Other | | Total | |
| Club | Season | Division | Apps | Goals | Apps | Goals | Apps | Goals | Apps | Goals | Apps | Goals | Apps | Goals |
|---|---|---|---|---|---|---|---|---|---|---|---|---|---|---|
| San Lorenzo | 2004–05 | Primera División | 0 | 0 | 0 | 0 | — | | — | | 0 | 0 | 0 | 0 |
| Linares (loan) | 2004–05 | Segunda División B | 6 | 0 | 0 | 0 | 0 | 0 | — | | 0 | 0 | 6 | 0 |
| Sabadell | 2005–06 | Segunda División B | 5 | 0 | 0 | 0 | 0 | 0 | — | | 0 | 0 | 5 | 0 |
| Torredonjimeno | 2006–07 | Tercera División | 31 | 1 | 0 | 0 | 0 | 0 | — | | 0 | 0 | 31 | 1 |
| Alcalá | 2007–08 | Segunda División B | 19 | 0 | 0 | 0 | 0 | 0 | — | | 0 | 0 | 19 | 0 |
| Jerez | 2008–09 | Tercera División | 32 | 1 | 0 | 0 | 0 | 0 | — | | 0 | 0 | 32 | 1 |
| Deportivo Laferrere | 2011–12 | Primera C Metropolitana | 18 | 0 | 0 | 0 | — | | — | | 0 | 0 | 18 | 0 |
| Boca Río Gallegos | 2012–13 | Torneo Argentino B | 10 | 0 | 2 | 0 | — | | — | | 0 | 0 | 12 | 0 |
| Sportivo Italiano | 2013–14 | Primera C Metropolitana | 1 | 0 | 0 | 0 | — | | — | | 0 | 0 | 1 | 0 |
| Brown | 2014 | Primera B Metropolitana | 0 | 0 | 0 | 0 | — | | — | | 0 | 0 | 0 | 0 |
| Almirante Brown | 2015 | Primera B Metropolitana | 8 | 0 | 1 | 0 | — | | — | | 0 | 0 | 9 | 0 |
| Almirante Brown | 2016 | Primera B Metropolitana | 11 | 0 | 0 | 0 | — | | — | | 0 | 0 | 11 | 0 |
| Almirante Brown | 2016–17 | Primera B Metropolitana | 21 | 0 | 0 | 0 | — | | — | | 0 | 0 | 21 | 0 |
| Almirante Brown | 2017–18 | Primera B Metropolitana | 11 | 0 | 0 | 0 | — | | — | | 0 | 0 | 11 | 0 |
| Almirante Brown | 2018–19 | Primera B Metropolitana | 2 | 0 | 0 | 0 | — | | — | | 0 | 0 | 2 | 0 |
| Almirante Brown | Total | | 53 | 0 | 1 | 0 | — | | — | | 0 | 0 | 54 | 0 |
| Cañuelas | 2019–20 | Primera C Metropolitana | 23 | 0 | 1 | 0 | — | | — | | 0 | 0 | 24 | 0 |
| Career total | | | 198 | 2 | 4 | 0 | — | | — | | 0 | 0 | 202 | 2 |

== Honours ==
Sportivo Italiano

- Primera C Metropolitana: 2013–14
