= Juan Cervián =

Spanish footballer

Personal information
- Full name: Juan de Dios Cervián Escobar
- Date of birth: 13 November 1975 (age 50)
- Place of birth: Seville, Spain
- Height: 1.80 m (5 ft 11 in)
- Position: Left back

Youth career
- Gorra
- 1986–1995: Sevilla

Senior career*
| Years | Team | Apps | (Gls) |
| 1995–1999 | Sevilla B | 102 | (4) |
| 1999–2001 | Granada | 36 | (2) |
| 2001–2006 | Almería | 127 | (6) |
| 2006–2007 | Sant Andreu | 26 | (1) |
| 2007–2008 | Sabadell | 24 | (2) |

Managerial career
- 2014–2017: Sevilla B (assistant)
- 2017–2018: Osasuna (assistant)
- * Club domestic league appearances and goals

Juan de Dios Cervián Escobar (born 13 November 1975) is a Spanish retired footballer who played as a left back, and is a current coach.

== Club career ==
Born in Seville, Andalusia, Cervián finished his formation with Sevilla FC. He made his senior debuts with the reserves in 1995 in the Segunda División B.

In the 1999 summer Cervián moved to Granada CF also in the third level. In 2001, he joined fellow league team UD Almería, achieving promotion in his first season.

Cervián played his first match as a professional on 31 August 2002, playing the full 90 minutes in a 1–2 home loss against UD Salamanca in the Segunda División. He scored his first goal in the division on 19 January of the following year, but in a 2–5 loss at CD Leganés; during his spell he was also team captain.

Cervián left the Rojiblancos in 2006, and resumed his career in the third division, representing UE Sant Andreu and CE Sabadell FC. He retired with the latter in 2008, aged 32.
