= Fran Machado =

Spanish footballer

Personal information
- Full name: Francisco Javier Machado Ramos
- Date of birth: 29 March 1984 (age 42)
- Place of birth: Armilla, Spain
- Height: 1.77 m (5 ft 10 in)
- Position: Attacking midfielder

Team information
- Current team: Arenas

Youth career
- Granada 74
- Elche

Senior career*
Years	Team	Apps	(Gls)
2003–2005	Elche B		
2003–2005	Elche	5	(0)
2005–2006	Villajoyosa	37	(8)
2006–2007	Alcoyano	27	(3)
2007–2009	Betis B	59	(6)
2009–2014	Jaén	167	(20)
2014–2016	Cádiz	59	(5)
2016–2017	Recreativo	26	(1)
2017–2019	Ontinyent	63	(3)
2019–2020	Alcoyano	25	(3)
2021–	Arenas	110	(14)
- * Club domestic league appearances and goals as of 13:30, 10 October 2025 (UTC)

Francisco 'Fran' Javier Machado Ramos (born 29 March 1984) is a Spanish footballer who plays as an attacking midfielder for Arenas CD.

== Club career ==
Born in Armilla, Granada, Machado played youth football for Elche CF, making his senior debut with the reserves in the Tercera División. On 2 November 2003, he appeared in his first competitive game with the first team, coming on as a late substitute in a 2–2 Segunda División home draw against Ciudad de Murcia. He was almost exclusively associated to the B's during his spell, however.

In the following eight years, Machado competed in the Segunda División B, with Villajoyosa CF, CD Alcoyano, Betis Deportivo and Real Jaén. He achieved promotion at the end of the 2012–13 season with Jaén, scoring three goals in 36 matches while acting as their captain. His first second-division goal came on 8 September 2013 in a 3–1 home win over Girona FC, and he totalled a career-best five at the professional level in an immediate relegation.

Machado then represented, still in the third tier, Cádiz CF, Recreativo de Huelva and Ontinyent CF. On 28 March 2019, after the dissolution of the latter club, the 35-year-old left.

On 12 July 2019, Machado returned to Alcoyano. In January 2021, he signed for Arenas CD in the Andalusian regional leagues.
