= Luis Tonelotto =

Argentine footballer (born 1976)

Personal information
- Full name: Luis Francisco Tonelotto
- Date of birth: April 13, 1978 (age 48)
- Place of birth: Concepción del Uruguay, Argentina
- Height: 1.85 m (6 ft 1 in)
- Position: Striker

Senior career*
Years	Team	Apps	(Gls)
1994–1996	San Lorenzo	2	(0)
1996–1998	Deportivo Italiano	55	(23)
1998–1999	Nueva Chicago	29	(13)
1999–2000	Almagro	28	(19)
2000–2002	Real Murcia	62	(17)
2002	Algeciras	0	(0)
2003	Avilés	5	(1)
2003–2005	Almagro	60	(28)
2005	Universitario	22	(10)
2006	Chacarita Juniors	14	(2)
2006–2008	San Martín (SJ)	64	(27)
2008–2009	Independiente Rivadavia	16	(12)
2009–2010	San Martín de San Juan	22	(4)
2010–2011	Boca Unidos	1	(0)
2011–2012	Gimnasia y Esgrima (CdU)		
- * Club domestic league appearances and goals as of 22:41, 23 September 2010 (UTC)

Luis Francisco Tonelotto (born April 13, 1976, in Concepción del Uruguay, Entre Ríos) is an Argentine retired football striker.

== Career ==
Tonelotto started his playing career in 1994 with San Lorenzo. In 1996, he moved down a division to play for Deportivo Italiano in the Argentine 2nd division. In 1998, he joined 2nd division Nueva Chicago and in 1999 he joined Almagro helping the club to secure promotion to the Argentine Primera.

In 2000 Tonelotto moved to Spain where he played for Real Murcia, in 2002 he played for Algeciras CF and in 2003: Avilés.

Tonelotto returned to Argentina and Almagro where he was the top scorer in the 2nd division and part of the squad that won promotion to the Argentine Primera. Tonelotto stayed with the club in the Primera, but they were relegated after the 2004-2005 season.

Tonelotto joined Universitario de Deportes of Peru in 2005 but soon returned to Argentina where he played for Chacarita Juniors before joining San Martín de San Juan in 2006. Tonelotto won promotion to the Argentine Primera for a third occasion in 2007. Tonelotto had a good Apertura 2007 scoring 8 goals and finishing as the club's top scorer. After two years with San Martín, he transferred to Independiente Rivadavia in July 2008.

== Individual honours ==
Season	Team	Title
Clausura 2004	Almagro	Primera B Nacional top scorer.
