= Sergio Sestelo =

Spanish footballer

Personal information
- Full name: Sergio Sestelo Guijarro
- Date of birth: 19 August 1978 (age 48)
- Place of birth: Madrid, Spain
- Height: 1.88 m (6 ft 2 in)
- Position: Forward

Senior career*
Years	Team	Apps	(Gls)
1999–2002	Real Madrid B	59	(8)
2002–2004	Numancia	45	(5)
2005	Ceuta	15	(3)
2005–2006	Huesca	30	(5)
2006–2007	Villajoyosa	28	(3)
2007–2008	S.S. Reyes	37	(6)
2008–2009	Linares	30	(3)
2009–2010	Compostela	26	(3)
2010–2011	Socuéllamos	?	(10)
2011–2012	Móstoles	?	(6)
Total		270+	(52)
- * Club domestic league appearances and goals

Sergio Sestelo Guijarro (born 19 August 1978) is a Spanish former professional footballer who played as a forward.

== Club career ==
Sestelo was born in Madrid. He started his career with Real Madrid Castilla, and trained occasionally with the first team as they won the 1999–2000 UEFA Champions League.

Ahead of the 2002–03 season, Sestelo signed with Segunda División club Numancia. After winning promotion to La Liga, he made his debut in the competition on 17 October 2004 in a 1–3 home loss against Levante; it was one of only three appearances during the campaign, ended in relegation as third-bottom.

After leaving the Nuevo Estadio Los Pajaritos, Sestelo spent the rest of his career in the Segunda División B or lower.
