= Bob Hacking =

English footballer

Personal information
- Full name: Robert Edward Hacking
- Date of birth: 30 March 1918
- Place of birth: Blackburn, England
- Date of death: 29 March 2001 (aged 82)
- Place of death: Hesketh Bank, England
- Positions: Inside forward; wing half

Senior career*
Years	Team	Apps	(Gls)
1942–1945	Blackburn Rovers	0	(0)
1945–1947	Luton Town	1	(0)
1947–1948	Brighton & Hove Albion	17	(2)
1948–1954	Southport	181	(6)
1954–195?	Lancaster City		
- * Club domestic league appearances and goals

Robert Edward Hacking (30 March 1918 – 29 March 2001) was an English professional footballer who made nearly 200 appearances in the Football League playing as an inside forward or wing half for Luton Town, Brighton & Hove Albion and Southport.

== Life and career ==
Hacking was born in 1918 in Blackburn, Lancashire, and attended Blackburn Technical School. He served in the Royal Air Force during the Second World War, and played for its football team as well as for Blackburn Rovers (1942–1945) and Luton Town. Hacking made his Football League debut for Luton in the Second Division in the first postwar season. He moved on to Brighton & Hove Albion of the Third Division South in August 1947 for a £500 fee, and played regularly in the first half of the season before falling out of favour with incoming manager Don Welsh. In August 1948, Hacking returned to his native Lancashire with Southport, where he remained for six seasons and played 181 matches in the Third Division North. He finished his playing career in non-league football with Lancaster City, and then became a market gardener. Hacking died in 2001 in Hesketh Bank at the age of 82.
