= Andrés Santos =

Spanish footballer

Personal information
- Full name: Andrés del Campo Santos
- Date of birth: 19 January 1980 (age 46)
- Place of birth: Madrid, Spain
- Height: 1.76 m (5 ft 9 1/2 in)
- Position: Midfielder

Youth career
- Real Madrid

Senior career*
Years	Team	Apps	(Gls)
1998–1999	Real Madrid C	30	(13)
1999–2001	Real Madrid B	31	(2)
2001–2003	Hércules	70	(10)
2003–2007	Lleida	116	(13)
2007–2008	Tenerife	33	(2)
2008–2011	Elche	72	(15)
2011–2012	Ontinyent	7	(1)
Total		359	(56)
- * Club domestic league appearances and goals

Andrés del Campo Santos (born 19 January 1980) is a Spanish former footballer who played as an attacking midfielder.

He amassed Segunda División totals of 180 matches and 24 goals during six seasons, in representation of three clubs.

== Football career ==
Santos was born in Madrid. An unsuccessful graduate of Real Madrid, he went on to play his first professional years in the third division, first with Hércules CF then with UE Lleida.

In the summer of 2007, after two second level seasons with the Catalans, with relegation in 2006, Santos moved to CD Tenerife on a two-year contract. However, after a successful season individually, he left the Canary Islands, staying in that tier with Elche CF.

== Honours ==
Lleida

- Segunda División B: 2003–04
