= Pedro Largo =

Spanish footballer

Personal information
- Full name: Pedro Largo Carazo
- Date of birth: 11 June 1972 (age 54)
- Place of birth: Barcelona, Spain
- Height: 1.76 m (5 ft 9 1/2 in)
- Position: Centre back

Senior career*
Years	Team	Apps	(Gls)
1988–1992	Carabanchel		
1992–1996	Getafe	72	(1)
1996–1999	Leganés	100	(5)
1999–2001	Badajoz	67	(3)
2001–2004	Murcia	71	(3)
2004–2006	Poli Ejido	49	(1)
2006–2007	Xerez	5	(0)
2008	Linares	2	(0)
Total		366	(13)
- * Club domestic league appearances and goals

Pedro Largo Carazo (born 11 June 1972) is a Spanish retired footballer who played as a central defender.

He played 314 Segunda División matches in 12 professional seasons, representing six clubs.

== Club career ==
Born in Barcelona, Catalonia, Largo nonetheless spent his first years in the Madrid area: after leaving amateurs RCD Carabanchel he moved to Getafe CF, who he helped promote to the second division, then played in that tier for the next nine years for Getafe and three other clubs, always as first-choice, with the exception of 2001–02 whilst at Real Murcia.

After starting in 32 of his 34 league appearances as Murcia promoted in 2003, Largo played his sole season in La Liga, which consisted of 16 games and immediate relegation. His debut in the top level came on 31 August 2003 in a 1–1 away draw against RC Celta de Vigo, at the age of 31; he spent the next three and a half campaigns again in division two, with Polideportivo Ejido and Xerez CD, taking part in almost no matches for the latter side.

Largo had a brief spell with lowly CD Linares, before retiring in the summer of 2008. Two years later, he joined the staff of newly elected president Luis Rubiales – also freshly retired after a failed experience in Scotland – at the Association of Spanish Footballers (Asociación de Futbolistas Profesionales).
