= José Antonio (footballer, born 1981) =

Spanish footballer

Personal information
- Full name: José Antonio Santana Arencibia
- Date of birth: 15 February 1981 (age 45)
- Place of birth: Las Palmas, Spain
- Height: 1.74 m (5 ft 8 1/2 in)
- Position: Right back

Youth career
- Las Palmas

Senior career*
Years	Team	Apps	(Gls)
1999–2002	Las Palmas B		
2000–2001	→ Gimnástica (loan)	15	(0)
2001	→ Vecindario (loan)	8	(0)
2002–2004	Las Palmas	55	(0)
2004–2006	Elche	29	(0)
2006–2008	Universidad LP	30	(0)
2008–2009	Fuerteventura	31	(0)
2009–2010	Castillo		
2010–2012	Gáldar		

International career
1998	Spain U16	5	(0)
1998–1999	Spain U17	12	(0)
1999–2000	Spain U18	6	(0)
2001	Spain U20	1	(0)
- * Club domestic league appearances and goals

José Antonio Santana Arencibia, known as José Antonio (born 15 February 1981 in Las Palmas, Canary Islands), is a Spanish retired footballer who played as a right defender.

== Honours ==
Spain U17

- Meridian Cup: 1999
