= Bob Redfern =

English footballer (1918–2002)

Personal information
- Full name: Robert Redfern
- Date of birth: 3 March 1918
- Place of birth: Crook, England
- Date of death: 3 July 2002 (aged 84)
- Place of death: Bournemouth, England
- Position: Outside right

Youth career
- 193?–1936: Tow Law Town

Senior career*
Years	Team	Apps	(Gls)
1936	Wolverhampton Wanderers	0	(0)
1936–1937	Cradley Heath		
1937–1947	Bournemouth & Boscombe Athletic	89	(4)
1947–1948	Brighton & Hove Albion	5	(1)
1948–1949	Weymouth		(3)
- Bournemouth FC
- * Club domestic league appearances and goals

Robert Redfern (3 March 1918 – 3 July 2002) was an English professional footballer who played as an outside right in the Football League for Bournemouth & Boscombe Athletic and Brighton & Hove Albion. He was on the books of Wolverhampton Wanderers without playing for their first team, and played non-league football for Tow Law Town, Cradley Heath, Weymouth and Bournemouth FC.

== Life and career ==
Redfern was born in Crook, County Durham, on 3 March 1918. He played football for Tow Law Town before joining Wolverhampton Wanderers in 1936 as an 18-year-old. His stay was brief: he was farmed out to Cradley Heath of the Birmingham & District League before signing for Bournemouth & Boscombe Athletic of the Third Division South in February 1937.

He, together with Cradley winger and future England international, Jack Rowley, went straight into the team for the visit to Walsall on 27 February. Redfern made 89 league appearances for Bournemouth over ten years, seven of which were lost to the Second World War, during which he played as a guest for clubs including Crystal Palace, Fulham, Luton Town and York City. At the beginning of the 1939–40 Football League season, Redfern scored twice as Bournemouth beat Northampton Town 10–0, a club record victory which would, as of 2024, still stand had the season not been abandoned because of the war and all results expunged. He finished his Football League career with a season at Brighton & Hove Albion.

He then returned to the south west, where he played non-league football for Weymouth and Bournemouth FC, and later acted as secretary of the latter club. As a youngster, Redfern had received a scholarship which gave him free secondary education, a luxury for which his father, an unemployed coal miner, would not have been able to pay – he was still at school when he signed for Wolves – and he went on to work as a schoolteacher in Bournemouth. Redfern and his wife, Betty, had two children, Sylvia and Robert. Redfern died at the Royal Bournemouth Hospital on 3 July 2002 at the age of 84.
