= Federico Basavilbaso =

Argentine footballer

Personal information
- Full name: Fede
- Date of birth: 24 March 1974 (age 52)
- Place of birth: Buenos Aires, Argentina
- Height: 1.77 m (5 ft 9 1/2 in)
- Position: Midfielder

Senior career*
Years	Team	Apps	(Gls)
1993–96	Deportivo Español	52	(1)
1996–99	San Lorenzo	60	(5)
1999–2004	CD Tenerife	122	(1)
- * Club domestic league appearances and goals as of 27 May 2014

Federico Basavilbaso (born 24 March 1974) is an Argentine retired footballer. He played as midfielder mostly in the Primera División Argentina.
