= Nuevo Estadio de La Victoria =

Stadium in Jaén, Spain

Coordinates: 37.776159°N 3.786839°W

Nuevo La Victoria
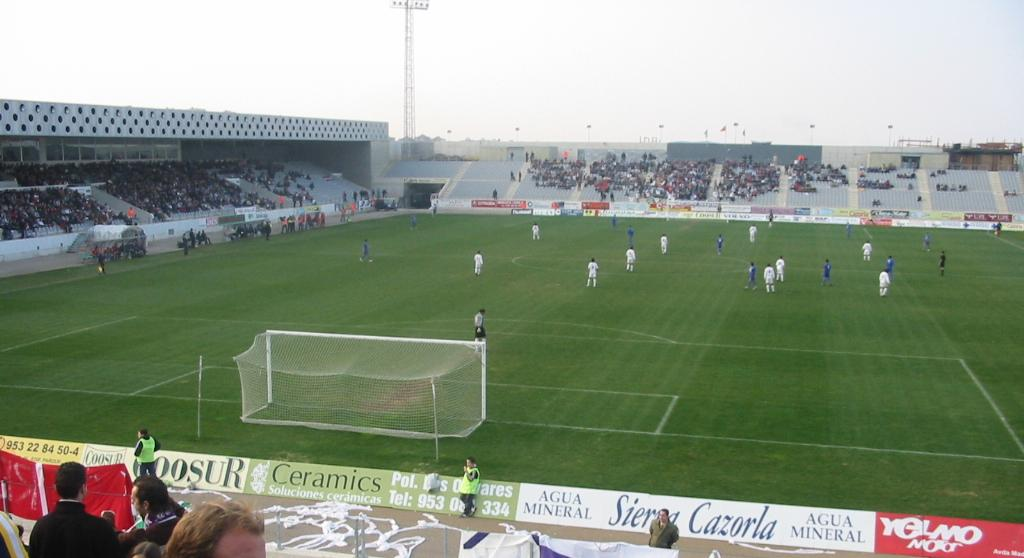
- Interactive map of Nuevo La Victoria
- Full name: Estadio Municipal de La Victoria
- Location: Jaén, Spain
- Capacity: 12,569
- Surface: Grass
- Field size: 107 x 67.5 m

Construction
- Opened: August 29, 2001

Tenant
- Real Jaén CF

(Nuevo) Estadio Municipal de La Victoria is a stadium in Jaén, Spain. It is currently used for football matches and is the home stadium of Real Jaén CF. The stadium holds 12,569 spectators.

The stadium was opened in 2001 after the demolition of the old Estadio de la Victoria.
