= Pierita =

Spanish footballer

Personal information
- Full name: Andrés Domínguez Candal
- Date of birth: December 16, 1918
- Place of birth: Santiago de Compostela, Spain
- Date of death: October 24, 1978 (aged 59)
- Place of death: Elche, Spain
- Position: Forward

Senior career*
Years	Team	Apps	(Gls)
1939–1942	Elche		
1942–1944	Málaga		
1945–1947	Alcoyano		
1947–1950	Elche		
1950–1952	Alcoyano		
1952–1953	Orihuela Deportiva		
1953–1954	Elche		
1958–1959	UD Cartagenera		
1959–1960	Imperial		
- * Club domestic league appearances and goals

Andrés Domínguez Candal a.k.a. Pierita (December 16, 1918 - October 24, 1978) was a Spanish footballer who played as a forward.

== Football career ==
Pierita was a historic Elche CF player in the 1940s and 1950s and is the top scorer in the history of Elche with 123 goals in over 200 league games. These registers are managed at three different times in Elche in the second and third level. In Elche he achieved two promotions to the second level in seasons 1940–41 and 1948–49. His real reward came with the CD Alcoyano whom he played in La Liga in the 1950–51 season. He also played for the Orihuela Deportiva CF on the second level and CD Málaga in the second and third level.
