= Estadio de La Condomina =

Football stadium in Murcia, Spain

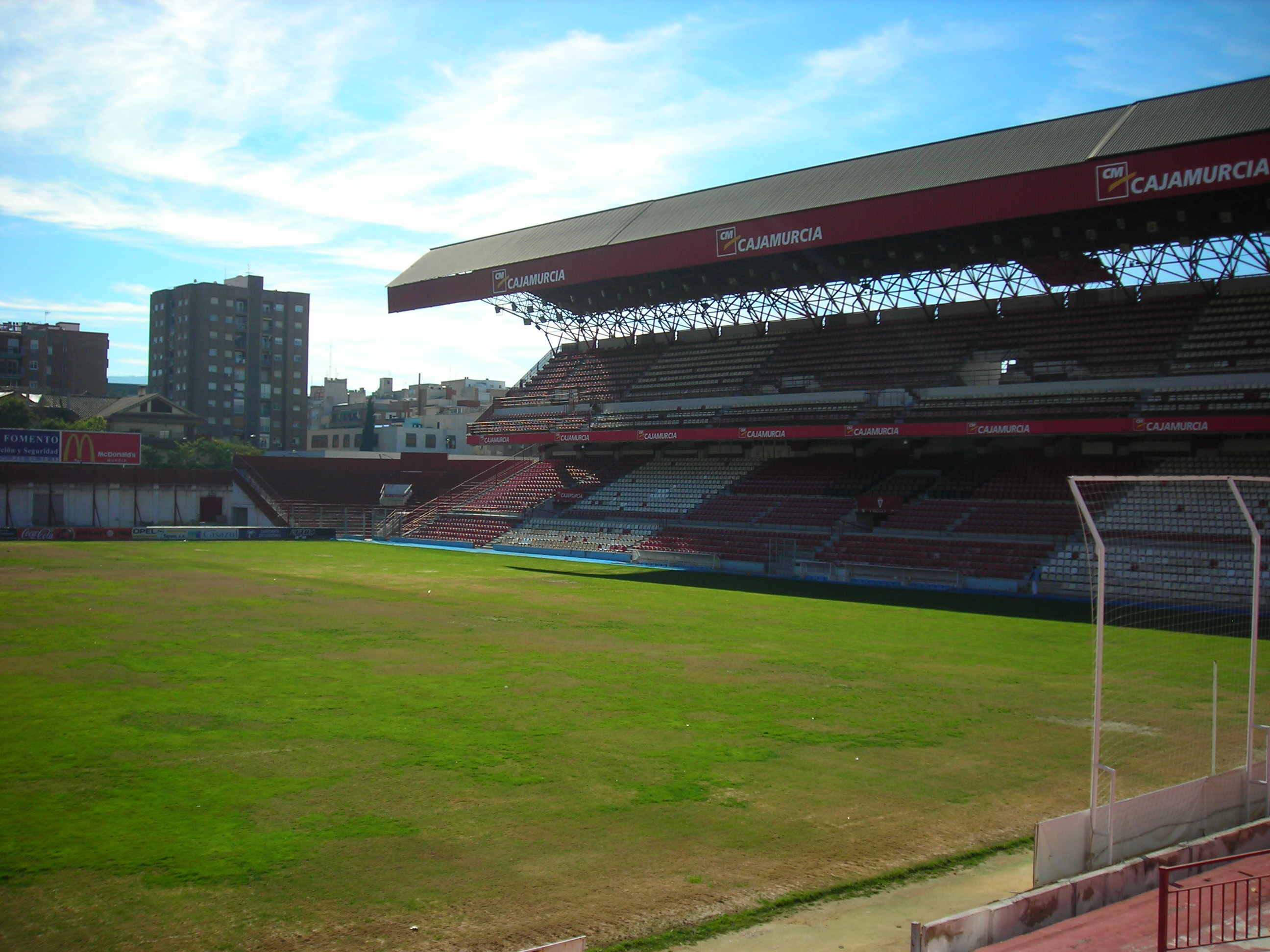
- Interactive map of Estadio de La Condomina
- Coordinates: 37°59′10″N 1°07′17″W
- Owner: Ayuntamiento de Murcia
- Capacity: 16,500
- Surface: grass

Construction
- Opened: 24 December 1924
- Renovated: 2016
- Cost: 600,000 pts
- Architect: Justo Millán

Tenants
- Real Murcia (1924–2006); Ciudad de Murcia (1999–2007); UCAM Murcia CF (2014–present)

La Condomina is a multi-use stadium in Murcia, Spain. The stadium holds 16,500 spectators (6,500 seated) and it is currently used mostly for football matches and music concerts.

== History ==
La Condomina was built in 1924 with an initial capacity of 16,800 spectators.

Real Murcia played at La Condomina for over 80 years before moving the Estadio Nueva Condomina in October 2006. Ciudad de Murcia played at the stadium throughout its existence.

In 1995, Real Murcia sold the stadium to the town hall for solving the financial trouble of the club.

Due to the danger of collapse of various stands, La Condomina was only allowed to host 4,500 spectators, until 2016, when UCAM Murcia promoted to Segunda División and financed the renovation of the stadium to meet the requirements of the LFP. La Condomina currently has a capacity of 16,500 seats.
