= Luis Gil (footballer) =

Spanish footballer (1976–2024)

Personal information
- Full name: Luis Gil Torres
- Date of birth: 28 January 1976
- Place of birth: La Pobla de Vallbona, Spain
- Date of death: 21 April 2024 (aged 48)
- Height: 1.80 m (5 ft 11 in)
- Position: Striker

Senior career*
Years	Team	Apps	(Gls)
1996–1997	Mallorca	5	(0)
1996–1997	Mallorca B	17	(4)
1997–1999	Logroñés	22	(1)
1997–1998	→ Gimnàstic de Tarragona (loan)	21	(7)
1999–2001	Real Murcia	75	(17)
2001–2003	Sevilla	22	(0)
2002–2003	→ Polideportivo Ejido (loan)	38	(5)
2003–2006	Elche	84	(3)
2006–2007	Tenerife	20	(0)
2007–2009	Alicante	57	(7)
2009–2010	Alcoyano	34	(4)
Total		395	(48)
- * Club domestic league appearances and goals

Luis Gil Torres (28 January 1976 – 21 April 2024) was a Spanish professional football player and administrator.

Gil, who played as a striker, made nearly 400 career league appearances for 11 clubs between 1996 and 2010.

== Playing career ==
Born in La Pobla de Vallbona, Gil played for Mallorca, Mallorca B, Logroñés, Gimnàstic de Tarragona, Real Murcia, Sevilla, Polideportivo Ejido, Elche, Tenerife, Alicante and Alcoyano.

== Later life and death ==
After retiring as a player, Gil worked as General Secretary of the Association of Spanish Footballers and as Director of Competitions of La Liga. He died on 21 April 2024, at the age of 48.
