= 1999–2000 Deportivo Alavés season =

Deportivo Alavés
1999–2000 season
- President: Gonzalo Antón
- Head coach: Mané
- Stadium: Mendizorrotza
- La Liga: 6th
- Copa del Rey: Second round
- Top goalscorer: League: Julio Salinas (8); All: Javi Moreno; Julio Salinas (8 each)

During the 1999–2000 season, the Spanish football club Deportivo Alavés placed 6th in La Liga. The team reached the second round of the Copa del Rey.

== Season summary ==
1999–2000 was Alavés's third season under head coach Mané, who guided them to the Segunda División title in his first season, and led them to La Liga survival with 16th place in 1998–99. The success continued in the club's second top flight campaign, as Alavés finished in sixth place, the best result in their history. This qualified them for the first round of the 2000–01 UEFA Cup, their first ever European campaign, where they went on to reach the final before losing 5–4 to a Liverpool golden goal. They had somewhat less success in the Copa del Rey, where they were eliminated on away goals in the second round after a 2–2 aggregate draw with Segunda División B side Real Unión.

== Squad ==
Note: Flags indicate national team as defined under FIFA eligibility rules; some limited exceptions apply. Players may hold more than one non-FIFA nationality.

No.	Pos.	Nation	Player
1	GK	ARG	Martín Herrera
2	DF	ROU	Cosmin Contra
3	DF	ESP	Ibon Begoña
4	DF	NOR	Dan Eggen
5	DF	ESP	Antonio Karmona
6	DF	ESP	Óscar Téllez
7	MF	ESP	Nan Ribera
9	FW	ESP	Julio Salinas
10	MF	ESP	Pablo Gómez
11	FW	BRA	Magno Mocelin
14	MF	ESP	Ángel Morales (on loan from Espanyol)

No.	Pos.	Nation	Player
16	MF	ARG	Hermes Desio
17	DF	ESP	Raúl Gañán
18	MF	ARG	Martín Astudillo
19	FW	ESP	Javi Moreno
20	MF	ESP	Jorge Azkoitia
22	DF	ESP	Josete
23	FW	BIH	Meho Kodro (on loan from Tenerife)
24	DF	ESP	Víctor Torres Mestre
25	GK	ESP	Kike Burgos
27	MF	ESP	Asier Salcedo
29	FW	ESP	Chus Herrera

=== Left club during season ===
Note: Flags indicate national team as defined under FIFA eligibility rules; some limited exceptions apply. Players may hold more than one non-FIFA nationality.

No. / Pos. / Nation / Player; 8 / MF / ESP / Alex Fernández (to Ourense)	No. / Pos. / Nation / Player; 21 / DF / ESP / Iñaki Berruet (to Villarreal)

== La Liga ==
Pos	Team	Pld	W	D	L	GF	GA	GD	Pts	Qualification or relegation
4	Zaragoza	38	16	15	7	60	40	+20	63	Qualification for the UEFA Cup first round (Note: Real Madrid qualified directly for the 2000–01 UEFA Champions League as holders. As a result, Zaragoza lost their spot in the UEFA Champions League and had to participate in the UEFA Cup.)
5	Real Madrid	38	16	14	8	58	48	+10	62	Qualification for the Champions League group stage
6	Alavés	38	17	10	11	41	37	+4	61	Qualification for the UEFA Cup first round
7	Celta Vigo	38	15	8	15	45	43	+2	53 (Note: VLD 3–3 CEL; CEL 1–1 VLD)	Qualification for the Intertoto Cup third round
8	Valladolid	38	14	11	13	36	44	−8	53	

Source: LFP
Rules for classification: 1) points; 2) head-to-head points; 3) head-to-head goal difference; 4) head-to-head goals scored; 5) goal difference; 6) number of goals scored.

== Appearances and goals ==
Last updated on 16 May 2021.

No.	Pos	Nat	Player	Total		La Liga		Copa del Rey	
No.	Pos	Nat	Player	Apps	Goals	Apps	Goals	Apps	Goals
1	GK	(Argentina) ARG	Martín Herrera	39	0	38	0	1	0
2	DF	(Romania) ROU	Cosmin Contra	36	2	33	2	3	0
3	DF	(Spain) ESP	Ibon Begoña	25	0	17+6	0	2	0
4	DF	(Norway) NOR	Dan Eggen	13	0	8+3	0	2	0
5	DF	(Spain) ESP	Antonio Karmona	37	1	35	1	2	0
6	DF	(Spain) ESP	Óscar Téllez	35	1	33	1	2	0
7	MF	(Spain) ESP	Nan Ribera	32	2	21+8	2	0+3	0
9	FW	(Spain) ESP	Julio Salinas	30	8	6+22	8	2	0
10	MF	(Spain) ESP	Pablo Gómez	38	2	34	1	3+1	1
11	FW	(Brazil) BRA	Magno	34	3	15+16	3	3	0
14	MF	(Spain) ESP	Ángel Morales	31	2	22+5	2	3+1	0
16	MF	(Argentina) ARG	Hermes Desio	38	2	35	1	3	1
17	DF	(Spain) ESP	Raúl Gañán	11	0	2+6	0	1+2	0
18	MF	(Argentina) ARG	Martín Astudillo	31	4	27+2	4	2	0
19	FW	(Spain) ESP	Javi Moreno	41	8	20+17	7	2+2	1
20	MF	(Spain) ESP	Jorge Azkoitia	25	4	7+14	3	3+1	1
22	DF	(Spain) ESP	Josete	5	0	4+1	0	0	0
23	FW	(Bosnia and Herzegovina) BIH	Meho Kodro	31	5	25+5	5	0+1	0
24	DF	(Spain) ESP	Víctor Torres Mestre	35	0	33	0	2	0
25	GK	(Spain) ESP	Kike Burgos	3	0	0	0	3	0
27	MF	(Spain) ESP	Asier Salcedo	7	0	0+5	0	2	0
29	FW	(Spain) ESP	Chus Herrera	1	0	0+1	0	0	0
Players who have left the club after the start of the season:
8	MF	(Spain) ESP	Alex Fernández	1	0	0	0	1	0
21	DF	(Spain) ESP	Iñaki Berruet	8	0	3+2	0	2+1	0

== See also ==
- Deportivo Alavés
- 1999–2000 La Liga
- 1999–2000 Copa del Rey
