= 2000–01 Deportivo Alavés season =

Deportivo Alavés
2000–01 season
- Manager: José Manuel Esnal
- La Liga: 10th
- Copa del Rey: Round of 64
- UEFA Cup: Runners-up
- Top goalscorer: League: Javi Moreno (22); All: Javi Moreno

During the 2000–01 season, Spanish football club Deportivo Alavés was placed 10th in La Liga. The team reached the final round of the UEFA Cup.

== Season summary ==
Deportivo Alavés enjoyed one of the greatest seasons in its history. Although they were unable to improve on the previous season's sixth-placed finish, they reached the final of the UEFA Cup for the first time in their history, facing English giants Liverpool. Alavés fought bravely and finished normal time level with Liverpool 4–4; the game went to extra-time, where Alavés narrowly lost to a golden own goal.

== Squad ==
Squad at end of season

Note: Flags indicate national team as defined under FIFA eligibility rules; some limited exceptions apply. Players may hold more than one non-FIFA nationality.

No.	Pos.	Nation	Player
1	GK	ARG	Martín Herrera
2	DF	ROU	Cosmin Contra
3	DF	ESP	Ibon Begoña
4	DF	NOR	Dan Eggen
5	DF	ESP	Antonio Karmona (captain)
6	DF	ESP	Óscar Téllez
7	DF	ESP	Delfí Geli
9	FW	ESP	Javi Moreno
10	MF	ESP	Pablo Gómez
11	FW	BRA	Magno Mocelin
14	MF	NED	Jordi Cruyff
15	MF	YUG	Ivan Tomić (on loan from Roma)
16	MF	ARG	Hermes Desio

No.	Pos.	Nation	Player
17	DF	ESP	Raúl Gañán
18	MF	ARG	Martín Astudillo
19	FW	URU	Iván Alonso
20	MF	ESP	Jorge Azkoitia
21	MF	ESP	Mario Rosas
23	FW	CRO	Jurica Vučko
24	MF	ARG	Pablo Brandán
25	GK	ESP	Kike
26	MF	ESP	Nacho Zaragoza
27	MF	ESP	Asier Salcedo
28	DF	ESP	Josu Sarriegi
30	FW	ESP	Epitié
32	DF	ESP	José Javier Etxarri

=== Left club during season ===
Note: Flags indicate national team as defined under FIFA eligibility rules; some limited exceptions apply. Players may hold more than one non-FIFA nationality.

No. / Pos. / Nation / Player; 8 / DF / CRO / Vlatko Đolonga (to Hajduk Split)	No. / Pos. / Nation / Player; 22 / DF / ESP / Josete (to Lleida)

=== La Liga ===
==== League table ====
Pos	Team	Pld	W	D	L	GF	GA	GD	Pts
8	Málaga	38	16	8	14	60	61	−1	56
9	Espanyol	38	15	7	16	46	44	+2	52
10	Alavés	38	14	7	17	58	59	−1	49
11	Las Palmas	38	13	7	18	42	62	−20	46
12	Athletic Bilbao	38	11	10	17	44	60	−16	43 (Note: ATH: 9 pts; RSO: 6 pts; RVA: 3 pts)

Source: LFP
Rules for classification: 1st points; 2nd head-to-head points; 3rd head-to-head goal difference; 4th head-to-head goals scored; 5th goal difference; 6th number of goals scored; 7th Fair-play points

== Results ==
=== Results by round ===
Round	1	2	3	4	5	6	7	8	9	10	11	12	13	14	15	16	17	18	19	20	21	22	23	24	25	26	27	28	29	30	31	32	33	34	35	36	37	38
Ground	A	H	A	H	A	H	A	H	A	H	A	H	H	A	H	A	H	A	H	H	A	H	A	H	A	H	A	H	A	H	A	A	H	A	H	A	H	A
Result	W	L	D	W	D	W	W	L	W	L	D	L	W	L	W	L	L	L	L	W	L	W	W	D	D	W	D	D	W	W	L	L	W	L	L	L	L	L
Position																																						

Updated to match(es) played on 11 May 2020. Source:
A = Away; H = Home; W = Win; D = Draw; L = Loss

=== Matches ===
10 September 2000 1	Las Palmas	0–3	Alavés	Las Palmas
		Report	Geli 1'; Moreno 60', 65'	Stadium: Insular; Referee: Puentes Leira

17 September 2000 2	Alavés	0–1	Villarreal	Vitoria-Gasteiz
		Report	Víctor 68'	Stadium: Mendizorrotza; Referee: Megía Dávila

23 September 2000 3	Zaragoza	2–2	Alavés	Zaragoza
	Jamelli 41'; Yordi 57'	Report	Moreno 21'; Desio 39'	Stadium: La Romareda; Referee: Ansuategui Roca

1 October 2000 4	Alavés	2–0	Osasuna	Vitoria-Gasteiz
	Moreno 73' (pen.); Alonso 89'	Report		Stadium: Mendizorrotza; Referee: Mejuto González

15 October 2000 5	Celta Vigo	1–1	Alavés	Vigo
	Karpin 3'	Report	Moreno 2' (pen.)	Stadium: Estadio Balaídos; Referee: Undiano Mallenco

22 October 2000 6	Alavés	1–0	Espanyol	Vitoria-Gasteiz
	Alonso 75'	Report		Stadium: Mendizorrotza; Referee: Muñiz Fernández

29 October 2000 7	Rayo Vallecano	0–1	Alavés	Madrid
		Report	Moreno 5'	Stadium: Campo de Fútbol de Vallecas; Referee: Llonch Andreu

1 November 2000 8	Alavés	0–1	Real Sociedad	Vitoria-Gasteiz
		Report	Jauregi 55'	Stadium: Mendizorrotza; Referee: Andradas Asurmendi

5 November 2000 9	Alavés	4–0	Oviedo	Vitoria-Gasteiz
Report	Moreno 22' (pen.); Geli 35'; Martinović 84' (o.g.); Cruyff 89'			Stadium: Mendizorrotza; Referee: García Aranda

12 November 2000 10	Valladolid	2–1	Alavés	Valladolid
	Moreno 49'; Ćirić 73'	Report	Moreno 55'; Téllez (red card) 87'	Stadium: José Zorrilla; Referee: Daudén Ibáñez

18 November 2000 11	Alavés	1–1	Valencia	Vitoria-Gasteiz
	Alonso 66'	Report	Carew 78'	Stadium: Mendizorrotza; Referee: Medina Cantalejo

26 November 2000 12	Málaga	3–1	Alavés	Málaga
	Silva 14'; Valdés 43', 82'		Begoña 87'	Stadium: La Rosaleda; Referee: Bueno Grimal

3 December 2000 13	Alavés	2–1	Athletic Bilbao	Vitoria-Gasteiz
	Contra 48'; Moreno 52' (pen.)		Ríos 26'; Ríos (red card) 70'; Ríos (red card) 88'	Stadium: Mendizorrotza; Referee: Prados García

10 December 2000 14	Racing Santander	2–1	Alavés	Santander
	Tais 83'; Amavisca 89'		Moreno 62'	Stadium: Estadio El Sardinero; Referee: Esquinas Torres

16 December 2000 15	Alavés	3–1	Deportivo La Coruña	Vitoria-Gasteiz
	Moreno 21', 26' (pen.); Alonso 72'		Sánchez 17'	Stadium: Mendizorrotza; Referee: Fernández Marín

20 December 2000 16	Barcelona	3–2	Alavés	Barcelona
	Rivaldo 2', 61'; Kluivert 67'		Javi Moreno 75' (pen.); Magno 77'	Stadium: Camp Nou; Referee: Ramírez Domínguez

7 January 2001 17	Alavés	1–3	Real Madrid	Vitoria-Gasteiz
	Téllez 44'; Begoña (red card) 53'		Raúl 13'; Karmona 55' (o.g.); Guti 88'	Stadium: Mendizorrotza; Referee: Ansuategui Roca

14 January 2001 18	Mallorca	4–3	Alavés	Palma
	Marcos 27'; Ibagaza 68', 80'; Novo 82'		Tomić 60'; Moreno 86', 89'	Stadium: Son Moix; Referee: Pérez Burrull

21 January 2001 19	Alavés	0–2	Numancia	Vitoria-Gasteiz
			Morán 22'; Pacheta 86'	Stadium: Mendizorrotza; Referee: Llonch Andreu

28 January 2001 20	Alavés	1–0	Las Palmas	Vitoria-Gasteiz
	Moreno 77'			Stadium: Mendizorrotza; Referee: Rodríguez Santiago

4 February 2001 21	Villarreal	2–0	Alavés	Villarreal
	Víctor 14'; Craioveanu 89'			Stadium: El Madrigal; Referee: Turienzo Álvarez

11 February 2001 22	Alavés	1–0	Zaragoza	Vitoria-Gasteiz
	Cruyff 17'			Stadium: Mendizorrotza; Referee: Muñiz Fernández

18 February 2001 23	Osasuna	0–1	Alavés	Pamplona
			Magno 68'	Stadium: El Sadar; Referee: Ansuategui Roca

25 February 2001 24	Alavés	2–2	Celta Vigo	Vitoria-Gasteiz
	Moreno 32'; Hervás 69' (o.g.)		Mostovoi 74'; Edu 89'	Stadium: Mendizorrotza; Referee: López Nieto

4 March 2001 25	Espanyol	0–0	Alavés	Barcelona
				Stadium: Estadi Olímpic Lluís Companys; Referee: Fernández Marín

11 March 2001 26	Alavés	4–2	Rayo Vallecano	Vitoria-Gasteiz
	Moreno 44'; Tomić 46'; Begoña 49'; Téllez (red card) 53'; Contra 89'		Míchel 21'; Quevedo (red card) 44'; Bolić 82'	Stadium: Mendizorrotza; Referee: Turienzo Álvarez

18 March 2001 27	Real Sociedad	1–1	Alavés	San Sebastián
	de Paula 42'		Alberto 58' (o.g.)	Stadium: Anoeta; Referee: Undiano Mallenco

1 April 2001 28	Oviedo	3–3	Alavés	Oviedo
	Onopko 28'; Oli 36', 74'; Danjou (red card) 79'		Alonso 26', 52'; Contra 80' (pen.)	Stadium: Estadio Carlos Tartiere; Referee: Llonch Andreu

8 April 2001 29	Alavés	4–2	Valladolid	Vitoria-Gasteiz
	Eggen 2'; Alonso 16'; Vučko 75', 87'		Eusebio 56'; Moreno 89'	Stadium: Mendizorrotza; Referee: Mejuto González

14 April 2001 30	Valencia	1–2	Alavés	Valencia
	Vicente 14'		Mendieta 7' (o.g.); Eggen 72'	Stadium: Mestalla; Referee: García Aranda

24 April 2001 31	Alavés	1–2	Málaga	Vitoria-Gasteiz
	Téllez 61'		Larrainzar 23'; Rufete 47'	Referee: Andradas Asurmendi

29 April 2001 32	Athletic Bilbao	2–0	Alavés	Bilbao
	Alkiza (red card) 44'; Ezquerro 64'; Yeste 70'		Téllez (red card) 82'	Stadium: San Mamés; Referee: Prados García

6 May 2001 33	Alavés	5–1	Racing Santander	Vitoria-Gasteiz
	Cruyff 16'; Moreno 35', 73'; Alonso 55'; Gañán 66'		Morán 60'	Stadium: Mendizorrotza; Referee: Puentes Leira

11 May 2001 34	Deportivo La Coruña	2–1	Alavés	A Coruña
	Naybet (red card) 14'; Tristán 45' (pen.), 53' (pen.)		Moreno 14' (pen.)	Stadium: Riazor; Referee: Ramírez Domínguez

19 May 2001 35	Alavés	0–1	Barcelona	Vitoria-Gasteiz
	Contra (red card) 86'		Overmars 17'	Stadium: Mendizorrotza; Referee: Medina Cantalejo

26 May 2001 36	Real Madrid	5–0	Alavés	Madrid
			Raúl 22', 82'; Guti 23'; Hierro 51'; Helguera 67'	Stadium: Estadio Santiago Bernabéu; Referee: Rodríguez Santiago

10 June 2001 37	Alavés	2–4	Mallorca	Vitoria-Gasteiz
	Karmona 4'; Azkoitia 57'		Nadal 5'; George 47'; Biagini 72'; Eto'o 82'	Stadium: Mendizorrotza; Referee: Turienzo Álvarez

16 June 2001 38	Numancia	2–1	Alavés	Soria
	Jaume 18'; Pérez 78'		Moreno 77'	Stadium: Los Pajaritos; Referee: Daudén Ibáñez

=== Copa del Rey ===
13 December 2000 Round of 64	Gimnástica de Torrelavega (Spain)	2–2 (4–1 p)	(Spain) Alavés	Torrelavega, Spain
	Javi 15'; Uribarri 90+3'	Report	Magno 54'; Epitié 68'	Stadium: Campos del Malecón; Attendance: 3,500; Referee: Muñiz Fernández (Spain)
	Penalties
	Penalty scored		(penalty scored); (penalty missed) Geli; (penalty missed) Gañán

=== UEFA Cup ===
==== First round ====
14 September 2000 First leg	Alavés (Spain)	0–0	(Turkey) Gaziantepspor	Vitoria-Gasteiz, Spain
20:30		Report		Stadium: Mendizorrotza Stadium; Attendance: 11,446; Referee: Steve Dunn (England)

28 September 2000 Second leg	Gaziantepspor (Turkey)	3–4	(Spain) Alavés	Gaziantep, Turkey
18:15	Yiğit 13'; Polat 35'; Albayrak 90'	Report	Alonso 30'; Tomić 55', 79'; Moreno 72'	Stadium: Gaziantep Kamil Ocak Stadium; Attendance: 9,901; Referee: Éric Poulat (France)

Alavés won 4–3 on aggregate.

==== Second round ====
26 October 2000 First leg	Lillestrøm SK (Norway)	1–3	(Spain) Alavés	Drammen, Norway
18:15	Helland 82'	Report UEFA Report	Begoña 2'; Téllez 21'; Contra 47'	Stadium: Marienlyst Stadion; Attendance: 2,000; Referee: Edo Trivković (Croatia)

9 November 2000 Second leg	Alavés (Spain)	2–2	(Norway) Lillestrøm SK	Vitoria-Gasteiz, Spain
20;30	Magno 1'; Epitié 69'	Report UEFA Report	Strand 4'; Søgård 50'	Stadium: Mendizorrotza Stadium; Attendance: 10,307; Referee: Attila Hanacsek (Hungary)

Alavés win 5–3 on aggregate

==== Third round ====
23 November 2000 First leg	Alavés (Spain)	1–1	(Norway) Rosenborg	Vitoria-Gasteiz, Spain
20;30	Javi Moreno 56'	Report UEFA Report	Johnsen 79'	Stadium: Mendizorrotza Stadium; Attendance: 9,920; Referee: Hartmut Strampe (Germany)

7 December 2000 Second leg	Rosenborg (Norway)	1–3	(Spain) Alavés	Trondheim, Norway
19:00	Skammelsrud 89' (pen.)	Report UEFA Report	B. Johnsen 20' (o.g.); Vučko 37'; Javi Moreno 61'	Stadium: Lerkendal Stadion; Attendance: 9,560; Referee: Stéphane Bré (France)

Alavés win 4–2 on aggregate.

==== Fourth round ====
15 February 2001 First leg	Deportivo Alavés (Spain)	3–3	(Italy) Internazionale	Vitoria-Gasteiz, Spain
19:30	Moreno 44'; Téllez 70'; Alonso 73'	Report UEFA Report	Recoba 45', 50'; Vieri 65'	Stadium: Estadio Mendizorrotza; Attendance: 17,307; Referee: Alain Hamer (Luxembourg)

22 February 2001 Second leg	Internazionale (Italy)	0–2	(Spain) Deportivo Alavés	Milan, Italy
21:00		Report UEFA Report	Cruyff 78'; Tomić 83'	Stadium: San Siro; Attendance: 9,845; Referee: Graham Barber (England)

Alavés win 5–3 on aggregate.

==== Quarter-finals ====
8 March 2001 First leg	Deportivo Alavés (Spain)	3–0	(Spain) Rayo Vallecano	Vitoria-Gasteiz, Spain
21:00	Azkoitia 30'; Eggen 79'; Vučko 80'	Report UEFA Report		Stadium: Mendizorrotza Stadium; Attendance: 12,352; Referee: Jan Wegereef (Netherlands)

15 March 2001 Second leg	Rayo Vallecano (Spain)	2–1	(Spain) Deportivo Alavés	Madrid, Spain
21:00	Quevedo 41'; Cembranos 80'	Report UEFA Report	Cruyff 19'	Stadium: Estadio Teresa Rivero; Attendance: 7,100; Referee: Claude Colombo (France)

Alavés win 4–2 on aggregate

==== Semi-final ====
5 April 2001 First leg	Alavés (Spain)	5–1	(Germany) Kaiserslautern	Vitoria-Gasteiz, Spain
21:15	Contra 20' (pen.), 31' (pen.); Cruyff 42'; Alonso 57' (pen.); Mocelin 81'	Report	Koch 68' (pen.)	Stadium: Mendizorrotza Stadium; Attendance: 15,157; Referee: Rune Pedersen (Norway)

19 April 2001 Second leg	Kaiserslautern (Germany)	1–4	(Spain) Alavés	Kaiserslautern, Germany
20:30	Djorkaeff 7'	Report	Alonso 23'; Vučko 64', 86'; Gañán 88'	Stadium: Fritz-Walter-Stadion; Attendance: 29,800; Referee: Hugh Dallas (Scotland)

Alavés win 9–2 on aggregate.

==== Final ====
16 May 2001	Liverpool (England)	5–4 (a.e.t.)	(Spain) Alavés	Dortmund, Germany
20:45	Babbel 3'; Gerrard 16'; McAllister 40' (pen.); Fowler 72'; Geli 116' (o.g.)	Report	Alonso 26'; Moreno 47', 49'; Cruyff 88'	Stadium: Westfalenstadion; Attendance: 48,050; Referee: Gilles Veissière (France)

== See also ==
- Deportivo Alavés
- 2000–01 La Liga
- Copa del Rey
