= 1998–99 Deportivo Alavés season =

Deportivo Alavés
1998–99 season
- President: Gonzalo Antón
- Head coach: Mané
- Stadium: Mendizorrotza
- La Liga: 16th
- Copa del Rey: Third round
- Top goalscorer: League: Gerard (7); All: Gerard (7)

During the 1998–99 season, the Spanish football club Deportivo Alavés placed 16th in La Liga. The team was eliminated in the third round of the Copa del Rey.

== Season summary ==
Alavés competed in La Liga, the top flight of Spanish football, in 1998–99 for the first time since 1955–56, having won promotion as Segunda División champions in the previous season, which was their first under head coach Mané. Their first top flight campaign in 43 years saw them flirt with relegation, but they ultimately finished 16th, one point clear of Extremadura and the relegation playoff places. In the Copa del Rey, they failed to match their heroics of the previous year, when they reached the semi-finals. They received a bye to the third round, where they were eliminated on away goals after a 2–2 aggregate draw with Segunda División side Las Palmas.

== Squad ==
Note: Flags indicate national team as defined under FIFA eligibility rules; some limited exceptions apply. Players may hold more than one non-FIFA nationality.

No.	Pos.	Nation	Player
1	GK	ESP	Kike Burgos
2	MF	ESP	Alfonso Vera
3	DF	ESP	Ibon Begoña
4	DF	BRA	Ivan Rocha
5	DF	ESP	Antonio Karmona
6	FW	ESP	Manuel Canabal
7	FW	ESP	Sívori
8	MF	ESP	Alex Fernández
9	FW	ESP	Julio Salinas
10	MF	ESP	Pablo Gómez
11	FW	BRA	Magno Mocelin
12	DF	ESP	Alberto Albístegui

No.	Pos.	Nation	Player
13	GK	ESP	Tito Subero
14	MF	ESP	Gerard (on loan from Valencia)
16	MF	ARG	Hermes Desio
17	DF	ESP	Alberto Belsué
20	MF	ESP	Jorge Azkoitia
21	DF	ESP	Iñaki Berruet
22	DF	ESP	Josete
23	MF	ITA	Nicola Berti
24	MF	ESP	Ángel Morales (on loan from Espanyol)
25	MF	ARG	Vitamina Sánchez (on loan from Feyenoord)
26	DF	ESP	Raúl Gañán
27	MF	ESP	Asier Salcedo

=== Left club during season ===
Note: Flags indicate national team as defined under FIFA eligibility rules; some limited exceptions apply. Players may hold more than one non-FIFA nationality.

No.	Pos.	Nation	Player
15	MF	ESP	Jon Solaun (on loan to Badajoz)
18	FW	ESP	Ismael (on loan to Logroñés)

No.	Pos.	Nation	Player
19	FW	ESP	Santi Revilla (on loan to Badajoz)

== La Liga ==
Pos	Team	Pld	W	D	L	GF	GA	GD	Pts	Qualification or relegation
14	Oviedo	38	11	12	15	41	57	−16	45	
15	Racing Santander	38	10	12	16	41	53	−12	42	
16	Alavés	38	11	7	20	36	63	−27	40	
17	Extremadura (R)	38	9	12	17	27	53	−26	39	Qualification for the relegation playoffs
18	Villarreal (R)	38	8	12	18	47	63	−16	36	Qualification for the relegation playoffs

Source: LFP
Rules for classification: 1) points; 2) head-to-head points; 3) head-to-head goal difference; 4) head-to-head goals scored; 5) goal difference; 6) number of goals scored.
(R) Relegated

== Appearances and goals ==
Last updated on 16 May 2021.

No.	Pos	Nat	Player	Total		La Liga		Copa del Rey	
No.	Pos	Nat	Player	Apps	Goals	Apps	Goals	Apps	Goals
1	GK	(Spain) ESP	Kike Burgos	22	0	20	0	2	0
2	MF	(Spain) ESP	Alfonso Vera	18	0	11+5	0	1+1	0
3	DF	(Spain) ESP	Ibon Begoña	32	1	30	1	1+1	0
4	DF	(Brazil) BRA	Ivan Rocha	26	0	17+7	0	2	0
5	DF	(Spain) ESP	Antonio Karmona	39	0	38	0	1	0
6	FW	(Spain) ESP	Manuel Canabal	32	5	23+7	5	2	0
7	FW	(Spain) ESP	Sívori	37	5	25+11	5	0+1	0
8	MF	(Spain) ESP	Alex Fernández	5	0	0+4	0	1	0
9	FW	(Spain) ESP	Julio Salinas	22	4	17+5	4	0	0
10	MF	(Spain) ESP	Pablo Gómez	35	5	34	5	1	0
11	FW	(Brazil) BRA	Magno	30	5	16+13	3	1	2
12	DF	(Spain) ESP	Alberto Albístegui	19	0	14+5	0	0	0
13	GK	(Spain) ESP	Tito Subero	18	0	18	0	0	0
14	MF	(Spain) ESP	Gerard	30	7	26+3	7	1	0
16	MF	(Argentina) ARG	Hermes Desio	37	3	36	3	1	0
17	DF	(Spain) ESP	Alberto Belsué	22	0	22	0	0	0
20	MF	(Spain) ESP	Jorge Azkoitia	26	1	8+16	1	2	0
21	DF	(Spain) ESP	Iñaki Berruet	33	0	31	0	2	0
22	DF	(Spain) ESP	Josete	17	0	9+6	0	2	0
23	MF	(Italy) ITA	Nicola Berti	8	1	0+8	1	0	0
24	MF	(Spain) ESP	Ángel Morales	7	0	4+2	0	1	0
25	MF	(Argentina) ARG	Vitamina Sánchez	18	1	15+3	1	0	0
26	DF	(Spain) ESP	Raúl Gañán	9	0	4+3	0	0+2	0
27	MF	(Spain) ESP	Asier Salcedo	0	0	0	0	0	0
Players who have left the club after the start of the season:
15	MF	(Spain) ESP	Jon Solaun	1	0	0	0	1	0
18	FW	(Spain) ESP	Ismael	2	0	0+2	0	0	0
19	FW	(Spain) ESP	Santi Revilla	8	0	0+7	0	0+1	0

== See also ==
- Deportivo Alavés
- 1998–99 La Liga
- 1998–99 Copa del Rey
