= Alfonso Subero =

Spanish footballer & coach (born 1970)

Tito Subero
Personal information
- Full name: Alfonso Subero Calvo
- Date of birth: 18 January 1970 (age 56)
- Place of birth: Calahorra, Spain
- Height: 1.79 m (5 ft 10 1/2 in)
- Position: Goalkeeper

Youth career
- Logroñés

Senior career*
| Years | Team | Apps | (Gls) |
| 1988–1990 | Logroñés Promesas | | |
| 1989–1990 | Logroñés | 0 | (0) |
| 1990–1991 | Calahorra | | |
| 1991–1992 | Numancia | 22 | (0) |
| 1992–1994 | Sestao Sport | 64 | (0) |
| 1994–1999 | Deportivo Alavés | 123 | (0) |
| 1999–2001 | Leganés | 15 | (0) |
| 2001–2002 | Burgos | 38 | (1) |
| 2002–2003 | Compostela | 25 | (0) |
| 2003–2006 | Mirandés | 48 | (0) |
| Total | | 335 | (1) |

Managerial career
- 2009–2011: Deportivo Alavés (goalkeeping coach)
- * Club domestic league appearances and goals

Alfonso Subero Calvo (born 18 January 1970 in Calahorra, La Rioja), commonly known as Tito Subero, is a Spanish retired footballer who played as a goalkeeper, and later worked as a coach. A youth product of local club Logroñés, Tito went on to play 18 games in La Liga for Deportivo Alavés during the 1998–99 season. He retired in 2006 at the age of 36.

== Playing career ==
=== Early career ===
Subero began his career in the youth teams of local side Logroñés, who were at their peak, playing in La Liga in the second half of the 1980s. Subero joined the B team, Logroñés Promesas, for the 1988–89 Tercera División campaign, and was called up to the first team squad by coach José Luis Romero the following season. Subero was third choice, behind Argentina international Luis Islas and Jesús Angoy, and didn't play any first team matches. Subero spent 1990–91 with hometown club CD Calahorra in the Tercera División, before joining Segunda División B side Numancia the following year. Numancia's established goalkeeper was Laureano Echevarría, who had previously represented Real Zaragoza in the top flight, but Subero was able to usurp him. Subero played 22 league matches that year as Numancia finished in a solid mid-table position.

=== Sestao Sport ===
Subero's performances earned him a move to Segunda División Sestao Sport in the summer of 1992, where he played alongside future Deportivo Alavés teammate Antonio Karmona. Subero made his debut in the third round of the Copa del Rey, playing in both legs as Sestao were eliminated 2–1 on aggregate by third tier side Extremadura, despite winning the away leg at Estadio Francisco de la Hera. His league debut came on 21 November, in a 1–0 home loss to Mallorca. Overall, he made 26 appearances that season, but it was a difficult year for Sestao, who went through three different head coaches, and were relegated after finishing second-bottom.

Subero was ever-present for Sestao in 1993–94, as they finished runners-up in their Segunda División B group, behind only his future club Alavés, who also knocked them out of the Copa del Rey. They qualified for the promotion play-offs, but finished third in their group, behind Ourense, who were promoted, and Real Jaén, and ahead of Gramenet.

=== Deportivo Alavés ===
Subero jumped ship in the summer of 1994, joining close rivals Deportivo Alavés, who were coached at the time by Txutxi Aranguren. He was immediately first choice, ahead of Xabier Mancisidor, and part of a successful side that also included Lluis Codina, Joseba Agirre, and future Spanish international Iván Campo. Subero's first season with Alavés was a successful one as they finished top of their Segunda División B group for a second consecutive season, beating out two of Subero's former teams in Numancia and Sestao Sport. In the promotion play-offs, Subero faced two of the same teams as the previous year, in Gramenet and Real Jaén, with Las Palmas completing the group.

The first four matches saw an away draw with Las Palmas at Estadio Insular, followed by three wins, but the fifth, away to Jaén at Estadio de La Victoria, went less smoothly. Subero was sent off after 84 minutes, and Alavés lost 3–1. Although Subero was suspended for the final match, where Jaén visited Mendizorrotza, Alavés managed a 2–1 victory, which was enough to top the group and earn promotion.

Ahead of the 1995–96 Segunda División campaign, Armando returned to Alavés from a loan spell at Bermeo to challenge Subero for the goalkeeper's position. Nevertheless, Subero appeared in every single league game that season, and all but four the following year. Other arrivals in the summer of 1995 included Óscar Arias from Compostela, Pablo Gómez from Real Valladolid, and Michel Pineda and Russian international Dmitri Kuzentsov from Lleida. These were joined by Iñaki Berruet from Real Unión in January 1996. These new additions helped Alavés to an excellent 7th-place finish, just one point outside the promotion places.

The summer of 1996 saw another slew of new arrivals, including Pedro Alberto from Real Oviedo, Pedro Riesco from Deportivo La Coruña, Pedro from Sevilla, Mario Meštrović from Hajduk Split, Jorge Azkoitia from Sestao Sport, and Bruno Alicarte from Bastia. Nevertheless, Alavés slipped to 13th in the table that season, which led to Aranguren being dismissed in February, following a 3–2 home defeat by Mallorca, and replaced by Marco Antonio Boronat.

There were two important arrivals at Mendizorrotza ahead of the 1997–98 campaign. The first was Mané, who joined from Levante to replace Boronat as coach, and the second was goalkeeper Paco Leal. Leal displaced Subero as first choice keeper, and so the latter played very little part as Alavés stormed to the Segunda División title, earned promotion to La Liga for the first time since 1955–56, and reached the semifinals of the Copa del Rey. Kike Burgos, signed from Mallorca, replaced Leal for the ensuing top flight season, but Subero was able to make his La Liga debut in a 2–1 loss to Real Sociedad at Anoeta on 24 January. He ultimately played 18 matches that year as Alavés narrowly escaped relegation in 16th place. This would prove to be the only top flight season of Subero's career, with the signing of Martín Herrera from Ferro Carril Oeste in the summer of 1999 spelling the end of his time with Alavés.

=== Leganés, Burgos and Compostela ===
After leaving Alavés, Subero returned to the Segunda División with Leganés. He played only twice in his first season, making his debut in a 1–0 home win over Lleida at Butarque on 12 March 2000. He came on as a substitute for the injured Raúl Arribas with 17 minutes to play, with Leganés already leading through Antonio López. In 2000–01, Arribas continued to be first choice, but Subero did manage 13 appearances, and also enjoyed some strong performances in the Copa del Rey. He played in the early-round wins over Racing de Ferrol and his former club Numancia, and also starred in the 1–0 round of 16 win over Celta Vigo at Balaídos, although Leganés still lost that tie on away goals.

Coach Quique Martín, who had taken over midway through Subero's first season, left Leganés in 2001 to join second tier rivals Burgos. He was followed by a number of his former Leganés colleagues, including Joyce Moreno, José Mari, Ángel Merino, and Subero himself. Subero played every league game that year, alongside a strong team which also included Dragan Isailović, Pepe Gálvez, Eduardo Conget, Dmitri Cheryshev, Manu, Carlos Merino, Dani Pendín and Jon Cuyami. However, they could only manage 16th place in the league 2001–02, and were administratively relegated at the end of the season thanks to their dire financial situation. This led to Subero packing his bags and joining another Segunda División side, Compostela. Remarkably, Subero scored a goal towards the end of his Burgos tenure, netting from the penalty spot in a 3–2 away win over Badajoz at Estadio Nuevo Vivero on 14 April.

Compostela, under the management of Luis Ángel Duque, were hardly in a better situation, and were also locked in a bitter dispute with the city of Santiago de Compostela. The Compostela side at that time included Fabiano, Pablo Pinillos, Stéphane Pignol, Maikel, David Cabarcos, Manuel Castiñeiras, Jesús Torres, and new arrival Juan Pablo Vojvoda, who joined from Newell's Old Boys. Despite this, their financial woes meant hopes were not high for 2002–03. However, the team performed well in the circumstances, and managed 9th place in the league. Subero, who faced strong competition from fellow keeper Oliver, played 25 matches, plus the Copa del Rey first round loss to Real Oviedo.

=== Mirandés ===
In a depressing reprise of the previous season with Burgos, Compostela's failure to pay their players, and other assorted debts, led to their administrative relegation to Segunda División B. Subero departed, and returned to the province of Burgos with third tier Mirandés. He played 35 matches in a strong first season with the club, which saw them finish third in their group, behind only the B teams of Atlético and Real Madrid. In the promotion play-offs, they were able to finish ahead of Badajoz and Lorca Deportiva, they missed out on the promotion spot, which went to Pontevedra. 2004–05 was much less successful for both Subero and his club, who went through three different managers: José Ignacio Soler, Cándido Arroyo and García de Andoin.

Subero made only 13 appearances as Mirandés ended the season at the opposite end of the table to the previous year, placing 16th and finding themselves in the relegation play-offs. Subero played in the decisive tie, which saw Mirandés condemned to relegation after losing on away goals to Talavera. The following season was Subero's last as a professional, as Mirandés finished as runners-up in their Tercera División group, and missed out on promotion after losing to Cobeña in the promotion play-offs. He retired in 2006 at the age of 36.

== Coaching career ==
After retiring, Subero went into coaching, and returned to his former club Deportivo Alavés as goalkeeping coach to their youth teams in 2008. A year later, he was promoted to become goalkeeping coach to the first team, a post which he held until the summer of 2011. He later left football to work in a computer repair and sales business.

== Honours ==
Deportivo Alavés

- Segunda División B: 1994–95
- Segunda División: 1997–98

== Career statistics ==
As of 23 May 2021

| Club | Season | League | | | Cup | | Other | | Total | |
| Club | Season | Division | Apps | Goals | Apps | Goals | Apps | Goals | Apps | Goals |
|---|---|---|---|---|---|---|---|---|---|---|
| Logroñés | 1989–90 | La Liga | 0 | 0 | 0 | 0 | – | | 0 | 0 |
| Logroñés | 1990–91 | La Liga | 0 | 0 | 0 | 0 | – | | 0 | 0 |
| Logroñés | Total | | 0 | 0 | 0 | 0 | 0 | 0 | 0 | 0 |
| Numancia | 1991–92 | Segunda División B | 22 | 0 | 0 | 0 | – | | 22 | 0 |
| Sestao Sport | 1992–93 | Segunda División | 26 | 0 | 2 | 0 | – | | 28 | 0 |
| Sestao Sport | 1993–94 | Segunda División B | 38 | 0 | 4 | 0 | 6 | 0 | 48 | 0 |
| Sestao Sport | Total | | 64 | 0 | 6 | 0 | 6 | 0 | 76 | 0 |
| Deportivo Alavés | 1994–95 | Segunda División B | 30 | 0 | 2 | 0 | 5 | 0 | 37 | 0 |
| Deportivo Alavés | 1995–96 | Segunda División | 38 | 0 | 0 | 0 | – | | 38 | 0 |
| Deportivo Alavés | 1996–97 | Segunda División | 34 | 0 | 0 | 0 | – | | 34 | 0 |
| Deportivo Alavés | 1997–98 | Segunda División | 3 | 0 | 0 | 0 | – | | 3 | 0 |
| Deportivo Alavés | 1998–99 | La Liga | 18 | 0 | 0 | 0 | – | | 18 | 0 |
| Deportivo Alavés | Total | | 123 | 0 | 2 | 0 | 5 | 0 | 130 | 0 |
| Leganés | 1999–2000 | Segunda División | 2 | 0 | 0 | 0 | – | | 2 | 0 |
| Leganés | 2000–01 | Segunda División | 13 | 0 | 4 | 0 | – | | 17 | 0 |
| Leganés | Total | | 15 | 0 | 4 | 0 | 0 | 0 | 19 | 0 |
| Burgos | 2001–02 | Segunda División | 38 | 1 | 0 | 0 | – | | 38 | 1 |
| Compostela | 2002–03 | Segunda División | 25 | 0 | 1 | 0 | – | | 26 | 0 |
| Mirandés | 2003–04 | Segunda División B | 35 | 0 | 0 | 0 | 6 | 0 | 41 | 0 |
| Mirandés | 2004–05 | Segunda División B | 13 | 0 | 2 | 0 | 2 | 0 | 17 | 0 |
| Mirandés | Total | | 48 | 0 | 2 | 0 | 8 | 0 | 58 | 0 |
| Career total | | | 335 | 1 | 15 | 0 | 19 | 0 | 369 | 1 |

1. Appearances in the 1994 Segunda División B play-offs
2. Appearances in the 1995 Segunda División B play-offs
3. Appearances in the 2004 Segunda División B play-offs
4. Appearances in the 2005 Segunda División B relegation play-offs
