= 2001 UEFA Cup final =

Football match between Liverpool and Alavés

- Match programme cover
- Event: 2000–01 UEFA Cup
Liverpool	Alavés
(England)	(Spain)
5	4
- After golden goal extra time
- Date: 16 May 2001
- Venue: Westfalenstadion, Dortmund
- Man of the Match: Gary McAllister (Liverpool)
- Referee: Gilles Veissière (France)
- Attendance: 48,050

The 2001 UEFA Cup final was a football match between Liverpool of England and Alavés of Spain on 16 May 2001 at the Westfalenstadion in Dortmund, Germany. The showpiece event was the final match of the 2000–01 edition of Europe's secondary cup competition, the UEFA Cup. Liverpool were appearing in their third UEFA Cup final, after their appearances in 1973 and 1976. It was the first European final they had reached since being banned from European competition following the Heysel Stadium disaster in 1985. Alavés were appearing in their first European final.

Each team had to progress through six knockout rounds with matches played over two legs. Both teams played 12 matches to reach the final. Liverpool's matches were mainly close affairs; none of their ties were won by more than two goals. The semi-final tie against Barcelona was won 1–0. In contrast, Alavés ties ranged from close to comfortable victories. They won their first round tie against Gaziantepspor by one goal, whereas they beat 1. FC Kaiserslautern 9–2 in the semi-final.

Watched by a crowd of 48,050, Liverpool took an early lead when Markus Babbel scored in the fourth minute. They extended their lead in the 16th minute when Steven Gerrard scored. Midway through the first half, Iván Alonso scored to bring Alavés within a goal of levelling the match. A few minutes before the end of the first half, Liverpool went 3–1 up when Gary McAllister scored from the penalty spot. Minutes after the start of the second half, Javi Moreno scored twice to level the match at 3–3. Liverpool went in front again in the 73rd minute when Robbie Fowler scored. With a minute remaining in the match, Alavés equalised thanks to Jordi Cruyff. The match went into extra time, the first half goalless. With the match heading for a penalty shoot-out, Delfí Geli headed into his own net; as a result, Liverpool won on the golden goal rule. The victory meant Liverpool completed a treble consisting of the Football League Cup, FA Cup and UEFA Cup.

== Route to the final ==
=== Liverpool ===
Liverpool's route to the final
Round	Opposition	First leg	Second leg	Aggregate score
1st	(Romania) Rapid București	1–0 (a)	0–0 (h)	1–0
2nd	(Czech Republic) Slovan Liberec	1–0 (h)	3–2 (a)	4–2
3rd	(Greece) Olympiacos	2–2 (a)	2–0 (h)	4–2
4th	(Italy) Roma	2–0 (a)	0–1 (h)	2–1
Quarter-finals	(Portugal) Porto	0–0 (a)	2–0 (h)	2–0
Semi-finals	(Spain) Barcelona	0–0 (a)	1–0 (h)	1–0

Liverpool qualified for the UEFA Cup by finishing fourth in the 1999–2000 FA Premier League. Their opposition in the first round was Rapid București of Romania. The first leg was held at Rapid's home ground Stadionul Giuleşti-Valentin Stănescu, where Nick Barmby gave Liverpool a 1–0 win with a goal in the 28th minute. The second leg at Liverpool's home ground, Anfield, finished 0–0, which meant that Liverpool won the tie 1–0 on aggregate to progress to the second round. Liverpool faced Slovan Liberec of the Czech Republic in the second round. The first leg at Anfield was heading for a 0–0 draw, until the 87th minute when Emile Heskey scored to give Liverpool a 1–0 victory. The second leg was at Liberec's home ground, the Stadion u Nisy. Liberec took the lead in the first half to level the tie at 1–1. Midway through the first half, Liverpool equalised to make it 1–1 on the night and 2–1 in their favour on aggregate. Two further goals in the second half by Barmby and Michael Owen, before a late Liberec goal, ensured Liverpool won the match 3–2 to progress to the third round after a 4–2 aggregate victory.

Olympiacos of Greece were their opponents in the third round. The first leg was held at Olympiacos' home ground, the Karaiskakis Stadium. Liverpool were heading for a 2–1 victory courtesy of goals from Barmby and Steven Gerrard, until Olympiacos equalised in the last minute to earn a 2–2 draw. The second leg at Anfield was won 2–0 by Liverpool, with a goal scored in each half by Barmby and Heskey respectively. The victory ensured Liverpool won the tie 4–2 on aggregate to progress to the fourth round.

Liverpool faced the Italian side Roma in the fourth round. The first leg was held at Roma's home ground the Stadio Olimpico, where Liverpool had won the European Cup twice in 1977 and 1984. Incidentally, Roma were the team Liverpool beat to win the European Cup in 1984. Liverpool were once again successful at the Stadio Olimpico, as they won 2–0 courtesy of two Owen goals in the second-half. The second leg at Anfield was a close affair. Roma scored in the 70th minute to take the lead, and needed to score another goal to take the match into extra-time. They looked like they had the opportunity to do so when the referee awarded a penalty towards the end of the match after he had adjudged that Markus Babbel had handled the ball. Moments later, he reversed his decision and instead awarded Roma a corner-kick. Roma were unable to score the necessary goal following the incident and Liverpool progressed to the quarter-finals courtesy of a 2–1 aggregate victory.

Portuguese side Porto were the opposition in the quarter-finals. The first leg in Portugal ended 0–0. Liverpool won the second leg at Anfield 2–0. Danny Murphy and Owen scored in the first half to progress to the semi-finals courtesy of a 2–0 aggregate victory. Liverpool were drawn against Spanish side Barcelona in the semi-finals. Liverpool defended resolutely during the first leg at Barcelona's ground the Camp Nou to earn a 0–0 draw. Houllier defended his tactics after the match, stating: "If I'd gone out and attacked and lost by three goals, you would be calling me naive. What's the point in being naive? That would be a betrayal to our supporters." The second leg at Anfield was equally close, until the 44th minute when Liverpool were awarded a penalty. Gary McAllister scored the subsequent penalty to put Liverpool 1–0 up in the match and the tie; a Barcelona goal would see them progress as a result of the away goals rule. Liverpool managed to see out the 90 minutes without conceding a goal to progress to their first European final since they were banned from participating in Europe following the Heysel Stadium disaster at the 1985 European Cup Final.

=== Alavés ===
Alavés' route to the final
Round	Opposition	First leg	Second leg	Aggregate score
1st	(Turkey) Gaziantepspor	0–0 (h)	4–3 (a)	4–3
2nd	(Norway) Lillestrøm	3–1 (a)	2–2 (h)	5–3
3rd	(Norway) Rosenborg	1–1 (a)	3–1 (h)	4–2
4th	(Italy) Inter Milan	3–3 (h)	2–0 (a)	5–3
Quarter-finals	(Spain) Rayo Vallecano	3–0 (h)	1–2 (a)	4–2
Semi-finals	(Germany) 1. FC Kaiserslautern	5–1 (h)	4–1 (a)	9–2

Alavés qualified for the UEFA Cup by finishing sixth during the 1999–2000 La Liga. They were drawn against Turkish team Gaziantepspor in the first round. The first leg at Alavés' home ground the Estadio Mendizorroza finished 0–0. After a goalless first leg, seven were scored between the two teams in the second leg. Alavés won the match 4–3 to progress to the second round. Alavés' opposition in the second round were Lillestrøm of Norway. The first leg was at Lillestrøm's home ground the Åråsen Stadion. Alavés won the match 3–1 with goals from Ibon Begoña, Óscar Téllez and Cosmin Contra. The second leg in Spain was a 2–2 draw, which ensured that Alavés won the tie 5–3 on aggregate to progress to the third round. Another Norwegian team, Rosenborg were their opposition. The first leg in Spain was a 1–1 draw. The second leg was held at Rosenborg's ground the Lerkendal Stadion. Alavés took an early lead when Rosenborg player Bent Inge Johnsen scored an own goal. Alavés scored a further two goals in the second half, and Rosenborg also scored one. Alavés won the match 3–1 to progress to the fourth round courtesy of a 4–2 aggregate victory.

The opposition in the fourth round was Italian team Inter Milan, who had won the competition three times. The first leg in Spain saw Internazionale go ahead 3–1 midway through the second half after Álvaro Recoba scored twice and Christian Vieri once. Alavés fought back to equalise in the 73rd minute after goals from Óscar Téllez and Iván Alonso secured a 3–3 draw. The second leg at Internazionale's home ground the San Siro appeared to heading for a 0–0 draw until the 78th minute when Jordi Cruyff scored. A further goal from Ivan Tomić ensured a 2–0 victory for Alavés. This meant that they progressed to the quarter-finals at the expense of the three-time winners due to a 5–3 aggregate victory.

Fellow Spanish side Rayo Vallecano were the opposition in the quarter-finals. Alavés won the first leg at home 3–0. Rayo took a 2–0 lead in the second leg at their ground the Estadio Teresa Rivero, but a late Cruyff goal ensured that Alavés would progress to the semi-finals. Their opposition in the semi-finals was German team 1. FC Kaiserslautern, the first leg in Spain saw four penalties awarded. Three were awarded to Alavés and one to Kaiserslautern, all were scored and a further two goals for Alavés ensured the match finished 5–1 to Alavés. Kaiserslautern needed to score four goals in the second leg to stand a chance of reaching the final. Instead, Alavés scored four goals. Kaiserslautern scored a consolation goal, but Alavés won the match 4–1 to progress to the final in their first season in European competition courtesy of a 9–2 aggregate victory.

== Match ==
=== Background ===
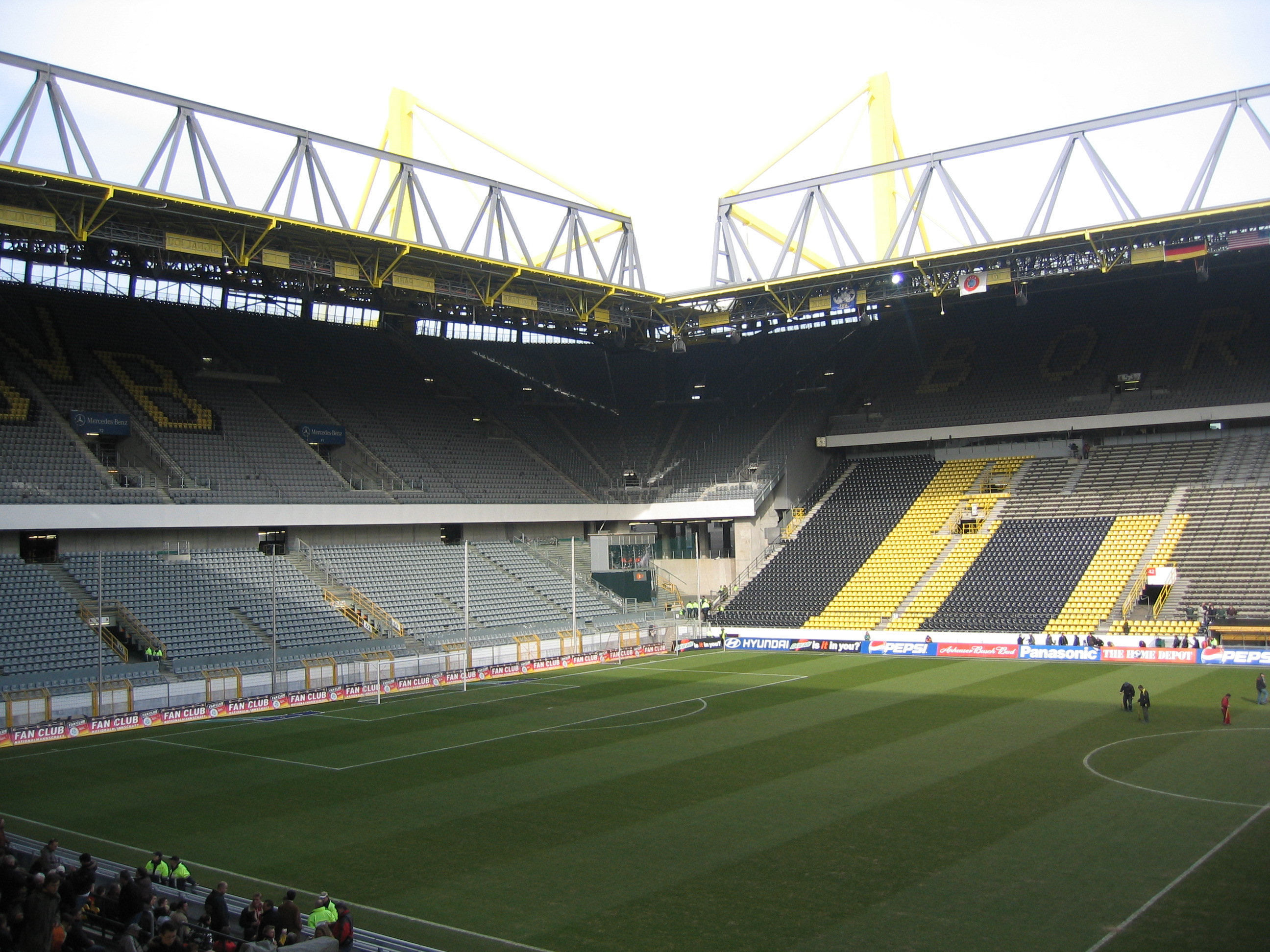
The Westfalenstadion in Dortmund was the venue for the final.

Liverpool had already won two trophies during the 2000–01 season before the final. Their first trophy was the Football League Cup which they had won in February, defeating Birmingham City 5–4 in a penalty shoot-out after the match had finished 1–1. The second trophy was the FA Cup, which they won four days before the final defeating Arsenal 2–1. They entered the match with the opportunity to win a treble. The final was held at the Westfalenstadion in Dortmund, Germany.

Liverpool were appearing in their third UEFA Cup final, both their previous appearances in the final in 1973 and 1976 had resulted in victory. They were also making their first appearance in a European final since their ban from European competition following the Heysel Stadium disaster. Alavés, on the other hand, were appearing in their first European final in their first season in European competition. They had been a semi-professional team six years previous. As it was their first season in Europe, Alavés had commissioned a special shirt that was pink and bore the names of all their 'socios' (members) as a memento of their qualification for Europe.

The Liverpool manager, Gérard Houllier, was wary of the threat posed by Alavés, despite their lack of experience in European competition. He stated: "I have heard it suggested that Alavés are just there to make up the numbers, and someone actually said this was the easiest tie we could have had,' Houllier said. 'That is not the case at all. We will not be making that mistake. If they are in the final it means they must be a good side, but unlike some people we were expecting them to reach the final. We set great store by what our scouts tell us." Despite playing in their first European final, Alavés were confident. Striker Jordi Cruyff believed being the underdogs would suit them: "We haven't been favourites in any of the rounds up to this stage, which means our opponents have felt that they really have to have a go and attack us as much as possible. That gives us time to counter and we are comfortable with that style. But we also have some really good players. At this stage of the competition it's not a question of confidence; it's a question of being realistic. I have a positive feeling about this game." Alavés captain, Antonio Karmona stated he had wanted to face Liverpool at some point in the competition: "The funny thing is that as we've been going through this UEFA Cup campaign we've been coming back into the dressing room each time hoping to draw Liverpool in the next round. This is the match that we've wanted all season."

=== First half ===
Liverpool won the toss and kicked off. Within the first three minutes Liverpool had scored. Babbel headed in a McAllister free-kick to put Liverpool 1–0 up. They nearly added to their lead minutes later when Heskey was put through on goal from a McAllister pass, but Alavés goalkeeper Martín Herrera cleared the ball with his feet. Two minutes later, Astudillo was shown a yellow card for a challenge on Heskey. Liverpool player McAllister also received a yellow card after he confronted the Alavés player over his challenge. Alavés' first opportunity to score was in the 12th minute. They were awarded a free-kick on the edge of the Liverpool penalty area following a challenge by Stéphane Henchoz. Oscar Téllez curled a shot towards Liverpool's goal, but Liverpool goalkeeper Sander Westerveld pushed the ball away. Three minutes later, Owen collected a Dietmar Hamann pass and played a diagonal pass to Gerrard, whose shot beat the Alavés keeper Herrera to put Liverpool 2–0 ahead.

Minutes later Alavés made the first substitution of the match when Alonso replaced defender Eggen. The change had the desired effect as four minutes later, Alavés scored. Right wing-back Contra put the ball into the area from the right side of the pitch and Alonso rose above Babbel to head the ball into the net to make the scoreline 2–1. Immediately afterwards, Alavés were almost level when Contra put another ball into the penalty area, but Henchoz cleared the ball before an Alavés player could reach it. In the 35th minute, Alavés were again nearly level. Alonso's header fell to Moreno, who went past Henchoz, but his shot was saved by Westerveld after it hit his chest. The rebound fell to Tomić, but Westerveld again saved his shot. Five minutes later, Liverpool were awarded a penalty. Owen had run into the penalty area past the Alavés defence, where he was brought down by Herrera, who was booked for the foul. McAllister took the penalty and scored to put Liverpool 3–1 ahead.

=== Second half ===
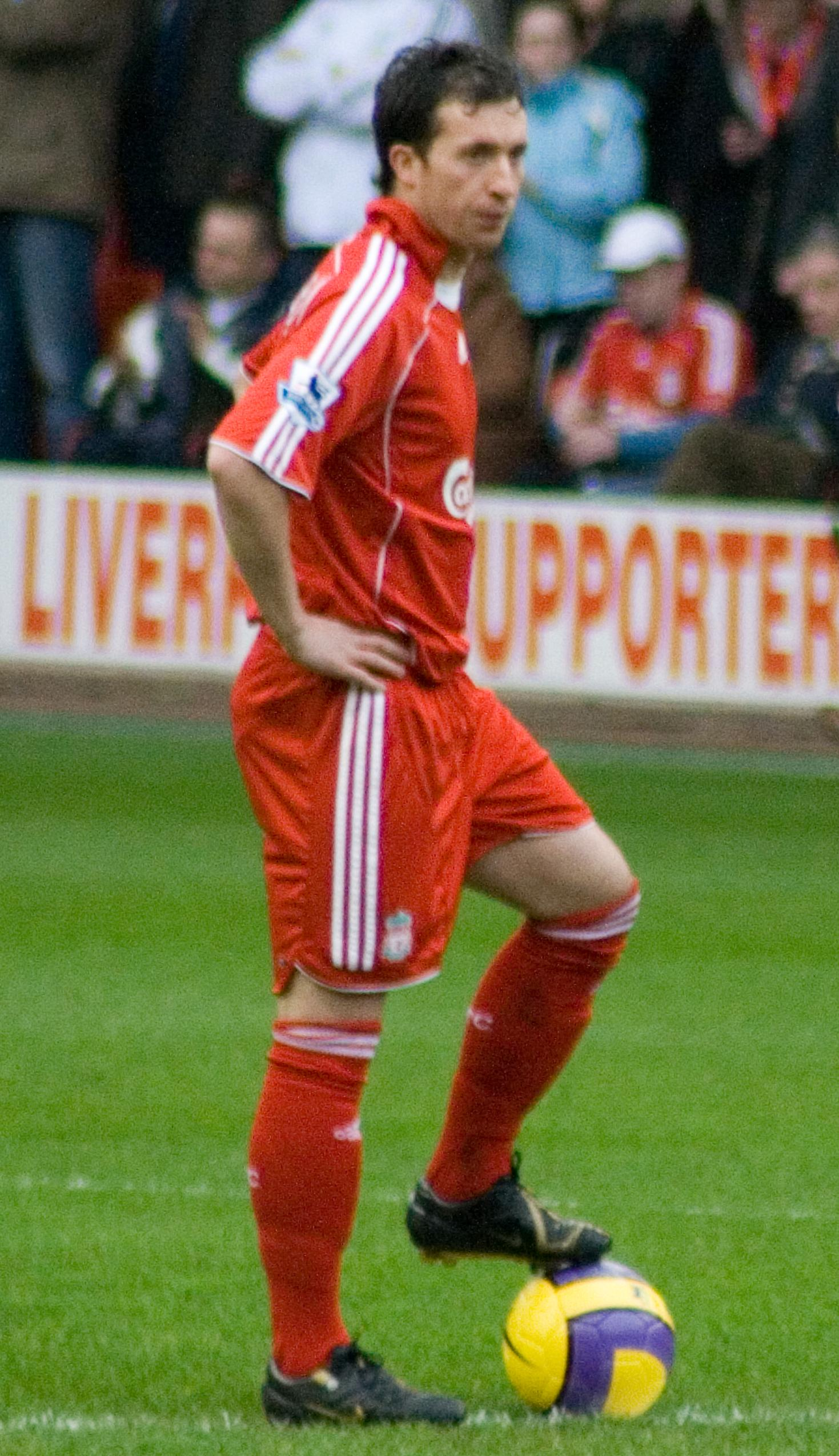
Robbie Fowler, who scored Liverpool's fourth goal

In contrast to the first half, it was Alavés who started the half the better of the two sides. Contra put a cross from the right side of the pitch into the penalty area, which was met by Moreno, whose header beat Westerveld to make the scoreline 3–2. Four minutes later Alavés had equalised. They were awarded a free-kick 25 yards away from goal and Moreno's shot went straight through the Liverpool wall and into the goal past Westerveld. Liverpool reacted to the scoreline being levelled at 3–3 by substituting Henchoz with Vladimír Šmicer. Gerrard was placed in the right-back position as a result of the change. Three minutes later, Owen was brought down by defender Karmona, who was subsequently booked. Liverpool were awarded a free-kick, which McAllister hit into the Alavés wall. In the 64th minute, both sides made substitutions. Liverpool replaced Heskey with Robbie Fowler, while Alavés substituted one of their goalscorers, Moreno, for Pablo.

Eight minutes later, McAllister passed the ball to Fowler who moved towards the centre of the pitch from the left-hand side and hit his shot into the corner of the Alavés goal to give Liverpool a 4–3 lead with 18 minutes of the match remaining. Two minutes later, Liverpool substituted Owen for Patrik Berger. In the 82nd minute, Alavés had an appeal for a penalty after a tackle by Hamann brought Magno down, but the Brazilian was subsequently booked for diving. With two minutes remaining, Liverpool goalkeeper Westerveld conceded a corner, which was headed into the goal by Cruyff to make the scoreline 4–4. Two minutes into injury-time, Contra went down under pressure from Gerrard in the Liverpool penalty area. Again, the referee deemed that there was no penalty. Following this, the referee blew his whistle to signal the end of 90 minutes of play. The match would now go into a 30-minute extra-time period.

=== Extra time ===
The golden goal rule was used during extra-time, which meant that whichever team scored first would win. Liverpool kicked off the first half of extra-time and within three minutes, Alonso had put the ball in the Liverpool goal, but was ruled offside. A minute later, Téllez was booked for fouling Fowler. Within four minutes, Alavés had been reduced to 10 men. Magno was shown a second yellow card for a two-footed challenge on Babbel. With a minute of the first half of extra-time remaining, Fowler thought he had scored the winning goal but it was disallowed as he was offside.

Alavés kicked off the second half and within seconds, Babbel was booked for bringing down Alavés defender Geli 30 yards from goal. The resulting free-kick was put wide by Hermes Desio. Three minutes later, Liverpool had a chance to score, but Fowler could not reach Gerrard's cross and the ball was subsequently cleared from the Alavés penalty area. In the 115th minute of the match, Alavés were reduced to nine men, when Karmona received a second yellow card for fouling Šmicer. McAllister took the resulting free-kick, which was headed into his own goal by Geli. As a result of the golden goal, Liverpool had won the match 5–4 to win their third UEFA Cup and complete a treble.

=== Details ===
16 May 2001
20:45 UTC+2

Liverpool (England)	5–4 (a.e.t./g.g.)	(Spain) Alavés
Babbel 3'; Gerrard 16'; McAllister 40' (pen.); Fowler 72'; Geli 116' (o.g.)	Report	Alonso 26'; Moreno 47', 49'; Cruyff 88'

Westfalenstadion, Dortmund
Attendance: 48,050
Referee: Gilles Veissière (France)

Liverpool	Alavés

GK	1	(Netherlands) Sander Westerveld
RB	6	(Germany) Markus Babbel	(yellow card) 106'
CB	2	(Switzerland) Stéphane Henchoz		(substituted off) 55'
CB	12	(Finland) Sami Hyypiä (c)
LB	23	(England) Jamie Carragher
RM	17	(England) Steven Gerrard
CM	16	(Germany) Dietmar Hamann
CM	21	(Scotland) Gary McAllister	(yellow card) 11'
LM	13	(England) Danny Murphy
CF	10	(England) Michael Owen		(substituted off) 78'
CF	8	(England) Emile Heskey		(substituted off) 64'
Substitutes:
GK	19	(France) Pegguy Arphexad
DF	27	(France) Grégory Vignal
DF	29	(England) Stephen Wright
MF	7	(Czech Republic) Vladimír Šmicer		(substituted on) 55'
MF	15	(Czech Republic) Patrik Berger		(substituted on) 78'
MF	20	(England) Nick Barmby
FW	9	(England) Robbie Fowler		(substituted on) 64'
Manager:
(France) Gérard Houllier

GK	1	(Argentina) Martín Herrera	(yellow card) 40'
CB	4	(Norway) Dan Eggen		(substituted off) 22'
CB	5	(Spain) Antonio Karmona (c)	(yellow card) 58' (yellow-red card) 116'
CB	6	(Spain) Óscar Téllez	(yellow card) 95'
RWB	2	(Romania) Cosmin Contra	(yellow card) 49'
LWB	7	(Spain) Delfí Geli
DM	15	(Federal Republic of Yugoslavia) Ivan Tomić
CM	16	(Argentina) Hermes Desio
CM	18	(Argentina) Martín Astudillo	(yellow card) 11'	(substituted off) 46'
AM	14	(Netherlands) Jordi Cruyff
CF	9	(Spain) Javi Moreno		(substituted off) 64'
Substitutes:
GK	25	(Spain) Kike
DF	3	(Spain) Ibon Begoña
DF	17	(Spain) Raúl Gañán
MF	20	(Spain) Jorge Azkoitia
MF	10	(Spain) Pablo		(substituted on) 64'
FW	11	(Brazil) Magno	(yellow card) 82' (yellow-red card) 98'	(substituted on) 46'
FW	19	(Uruguay) Iván Alonso		(substituted on) 22'
Manager:
(Spain) Mané

Man of the Match
Gary McAllister (Liverpool)
Assistant referees
Serge Vallin (France)
Vincent Texier (France)
Fourth official
Alain Sars (France)

Match rules

- 90 minutes
- 30 minutes of golden goal extra time if necessary
- Penalty shoot-out if scores still level
- Seven named substitutes, of which up to three may be used

== Post-match ==
Liverpool's victory was their third UEFA Cup success, putting them level with Internazionale and Juventus as the teams with the most success in the competition. Their victory also meant they completed a treble of cup victories, as they had won the Football League Cup and the FA Cup earlier in the season.

The match was hailed as one of the most exciting finals in modern times, which BBC Sport pundit, Alan Hansen, declared as "the best final ever." The Liverpool manager Gérard Houllier hailed his players after the match: "When you play in a European final, you are looking for immortality. People remember who was playing and when you look at programmes from finals you just recall the facts of the game. These boys have produced a game which will be remembered for a long time – and that is thanks to Alavés too." Houllier hit back at critics who had labelled Liverpool as boring before the match: "Maybe we are a boring side – as I seem to keep reading – but I will put up with that. We must have scored 122 of our 123 goals on the counter-attack, but all I know is that our total this season is the third highest in Liverpool's history."

The performance of McAllister was lauded after the match. BBC Sport commentator, Trevor Brooking, stated: "Gary McAllister was outstanding." Alan Hansen also praised McAllister's performance: "Gary McAllister was outstanding. At 36, to keep going the way he did, keep taking those free-kicks and producing it when it counted, was sensational. He fully deserved his man of the match award." McAllister was optimistic about the future of Liverpool: "This is an amazing game for all the young guys at the club to be playing in so early in their career, hopefully they will go and make Liverpool great again."

The Alavés manager Mané praised his players despite their loss: "Dortmund has seen a great final, and it was possibly the smallest team in the competition that made it great." Esnal saluted his players for their character especially for equalising twice in the match: "We played with pride and class to get the score back to 4–4 at the end of normal time, the result of that, however, was that we were half dead going into extra-time. But we're the same team as we were two hours ago. One side always has to lose a final, just as one wins."

Despite their success, Liverpool were not celebrating immediately after the match, as they had an important match in the Premier League on the Saturday following the final. The match against Charlton Athletic was a must-win match for Liverpool if they wanted to finish in third place in the league and claim the final UEFA Champions League qualification place. Liverpool won 4–0 to secure their place in the 2001–02 UEFA Champions League. Winning the UEFA Cup entitled Liverpool to compete in the 2001 UEFA Super Cup against Champions League winners Bayern Munich. Liverpool won the match 3–2 to secure their second Super Cup victory. Following the final, Alavés had four matches remaining in the 2000–01 La Liga. They lost all four matches and finished the season in 10th place, outside of the qualification spots for European competition.

== See also ==
- 2001 UEFA Champions League final
- 2001 UEFA Super Cup
- Liverpool F.C. in international football
- 2000–01 Deportivo Alavés season
- 2000–01 Liverpool F.C. season

== Bibliography ==
- Wilson, Jonathan; Murray, Scott (2013). The Anatomy of Liverpool: A History in Ten Matches. London: Orion. ISBN 978-1-4091-2692-8.
