= Josete =

Josete may refer to:

== People ==
- José Tomás Valdominos (born 1970), Spanish footballer
- José Pedro Berenguer Soriano (born 1980), Spanish footballer
- José Antonio Malagón Rubio (born 1988), Spanish footballer
- José Antonio Miranda Boacho (born 1998), Equatoguinean footballer
