= Iker Begoña =

Spanish footballer

Personal information
- Full name: Iker Begoña Zubiaur
- Date of birth: 15 November 1976 (age 49)
- Place of birth: Bilbao, Spain
- Height: 1.86 m (6 ft 1 in)
- Positions: Centre-back; defensive midfielder

Youth career
- Athletic Bilbao

Senior career*
Years	Team	Apps	(Gls)
1996–1997	Basconia		
1997–1998	Bilbao Athletic	10	(1)
1998–1999	Gernika	30	(2)
1999–2000	Bermeo	34	(1)
2000–2001	Amurrio	35	(2)
2001	Alicante	12	(1)
2001–2006	Recreativo	141	(6)
2006–2007	Lorca Deportiva	20	(0)
2007–2009	Albacete	73	(3)
2009–2011	Levadiakos	32	(1)
2012	Thrasyvoulos	16	(1)
Total		403	(18)
- * Club domestic league appearances and goals

Iker Begoña Zubiaur (born 15 November 1976) is a Spanish former professional footballer who played as a central defender or a defensive midfielder.

== Club career ==
Born in Bilbao, Basque Country, Begoña reached the Segunda División in late 2001 at already 25, signing with Recreativo de Huelva from lowly Alicante CF. He appeared in 21 games and scored one goal in his first season to help his team return to La Liga after an absence of 23 years, then remained a further four campaigns with the Andalusians, three of them in the second division; he made his debut in his country's top flight on 1 September 2002, playing the full 90 minutes in a 2–3 home loss against Málaga CF.

Subsequently, Begoña continued competing in the second tier, with Lorca Deportiva CF and Albacete Balompié. In November 2009, the 33-year-old moved abroad for the first time in his career, signing with Levadiakos F.C. in the Super League Greece. He split the 2011–12 campaign in the same country with that club and Thrasyvoulos F.C. of the second division, retiring at its closure.

== Personal life ==
Begoña's older brother, Ibon, was also a footballer and a defender.

== Honours ==
Recreativo

- Segunda División: 2005–06
