= Óscar Téllez =

Spanish footballer and manager

Personal information
- Full name: Óscar Téllez Gómez
- Date of birth: 2 April 1975 (age 51)
- Place of birth: Madrid, Spain
- Height: 1.86 m (6 ft 1 in)
- Position: Centre-back

Youth career
- Arganda
- 1986–1992: Real Madrid

Senior career*
Years	Team	Apps	(Gls)
1993–1995	Moscardó	35	(2)
1995–1996	Aranjuez	33	(0)
1996–1997	Pontevedra	34	(0)
1997–1998	Alavés	37	(3)
1998–1999	Valencia	1	(0)
1999	→ Villarreal (loan)	20	(0)
1999–2006	Alavés	200	(5)
Total		360	(10)

International career
2001–2002	Spain	4	(0)

Managerial career
- 2010–2011: Nuevo Mejorada (youth)
- 2011–2012: San Martín Vega
- 2012–2013: Villaverde
- 2013–2014: Loeches-Mejorada
- 2014–2015: San Fernando (youth)
- 2017–2022: Aurrerá
- * Club domestic league appearances and goals

Óscar Téllez Gómez (born 2 April 1975) is a Spanish former professional footballer who played as a central defender.

He was mostly known for his Alavés spell, and he made 144 La Liga appearances over six seasons and scored three goals (276 in all competitions).

== Club career ==
Téllez was born in Madrid. After four years with modest clubs as well as the 1997–98 season in the Segunda División with Deportivo Alavés (helping to a return to La Liga after a 42-year absence), he joined Valencia CF for 1998–99 but, having made just one appearance, finished the campaign with neighbours Villarreal CF also in the first division. Although he played all the matches except two during his short spell, he could not prevent the team's eventual relegation.

Subsequently, Téllez returned to Alavés whom had in turn retained top-flight status, contributing 33 appearances in 1999–2000 to help the Basques overachieve for a final sixth place. On 5 March 2000, he scored his first goal in the competition, the game's only in an away win against Rayo Vallecano.

The following season, Téllez was instrumental in both the domestic and European fronts, forming a solid defensive partnership with Antonio Karmona as Alavés reached the 2001 UEFA Cup final, lost to Liverpool in extra time. He continued to feature prominently for the side the next four years, returning to the top tier at the end of 2004–05 and totalling 53 yellow cards and seven red during this timeframe.

In early 2006, having quarrelled with the board of directors (amongst accusations he was grossly overweight, a condition which had bothered him on previous occasions), which featured the eccentric Dmitry Piterman, Téllez was fired, retiring from professional football shortly after.

== International career ==
Téllez was capped four times by Spain. He made his debut on 25 April 2001 in a friendly against Japan, in Córdoba.

== Post-retirement ==
After retiring, Téllez acted as manager to several amateur and youth clubs. At the same time, he worked in the Madrid–Barajas Airport as baggage handler.

== Honours ==
Alavés

- Segunda División: 1997–98

Valencia

- UEFA Intertoto Cup: 1998
