= Iván Alonso =

Uruguayan footballer (born 1979)

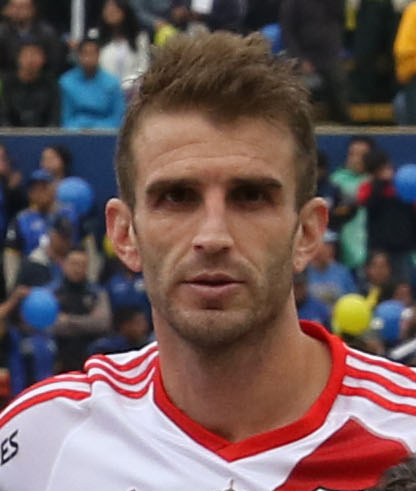
- Alonso in 2016

Personal information
- Full name: Iván Daniel Alonso Vallejo
- Date of birth: 10 April 1979 (age 47)
- Place of birth: Montevideo, Uruguay
- Height: 1.80 m (5 ft 11 in)
- Position: Striker

Team information
- Current team: Cruz Azul (sporting director)

Youth career
- 1993: Defensor
- 1994–1997: River Plate (UY)

Senior career*
Years	Team	Apps	(Gls)
1998–1999	River Plate (UY)	41	(9)
2000–2004	Alavés	116	(20)
2004–2009	Murcia	158	(48)
2009–2011	Espanyol	70	(12)
2011–2012	Toluca	34	(25)
2013–2015	Nacional	71	(51)
2016–2017	River Plate	26	(3)
Total		516	(168)
- * Club domestic league appearances and goals

Iván Daniel Alonso Vallejo (born 10 April 1979) is a Uruguayan former professional footballer who played as a striker. He is the sporting director of Liga MX club Cruz Azul.

Gifted with an excellent aerial ability, he was most noted for his Alavés stint, and spent the bulk of his professional career in Spain, playing for three teams and appearing in seven La Liga seasons, three each with Alavés and Espanyol.

== Club career ==
=== Early years and Alavés ===
Born in Montevideo, Alonso started his professional career with local River Plate. He moved to Spain's Alavés afterwards, scoring eight league goals – often as a substitute – in his first season while also being an important attacking element in the Basque side's UEFA Cup exploits, as he netted in the final against Liverpool, but ultimately lost 5–4 in extra time; during his spell, he formed a formidable partnership with Javi Moreno (later of AC Milan).

After playing 2003–04 in the Segunda División, Alonso stayed in that tier, moving to Real Murcia and scoring 11 goals in his debut campaign. An undisputed starter from his arrival onwards, he added 14 in 40 matches in 2006–07 as the club returned to La Liga after a three-year absence.

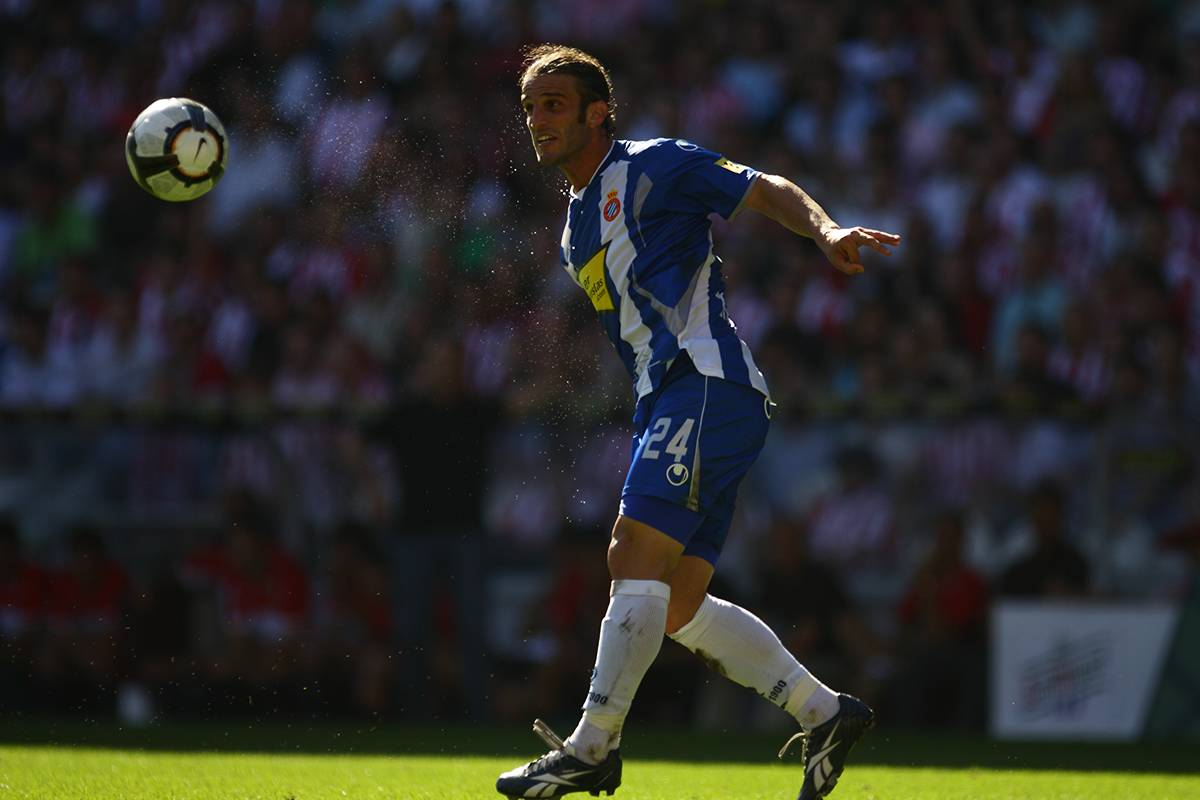
Alonso in action for Espanyol

=== Espanyol ===
In the 2007–08 season, Alonso was again the team's top scorer at 10, but they would be nonetheless immediately relegated. In January 2009, however, he returned to the top flight, joining Espanyol for €2.4 million on a deal running until the end of the season and two more. Benefitting from injuries and loss of form to legendary Raúl Tamudo he netted some important goals for the Catalans, including two at Almería on 23 May 2009 which guaranteed their permanence in the top division a further year.

On 23 September 2009, Alonso scored in the club's first win of the 2009–10 campaign, the first ever at new Estadi Cornellà-El Prat, against Málaga (2–1), and dedicated it to Daniel Jarque, deceased in the team's preseason in Italy. He would lose his starting job following the arrival, in January 2010, of Dani Osvaldo, on loan; however, on 11 April, one day after his 31st birthday, he managed to add his name to the scoresheet in Espanyol's 3–0 home victory over Atlético Madrid, having played only one minute after having replaced precisely the Argentine.

=== Later career ===
In June 2011, after 11 years in Spain (amassing professional totals of 344 games and 80 goals), the 32-year-old Alonso moved countries and signed with Toluca of Mexico, being the Liga MX's top scorer in his only season, the Clausura 2012, even though the team could only rank in 12th position overall.

In early July 2012, Alonso left the Red Devils because of a heart condition, subsequently retiring from football – his doctor advised him not to play with Toluca as the high altitude of the city might worsen his condition. In early 2013, however, he returned to the sport, joining hometown's Nacional. He scored 23 goals in the 2014–15 season, helping his team win the Uruguayan Primera División for the 45th time in history.

Alonso announced his retirement in April 2018, after two years in Argentina with River Plate.

== Post-retirement ==
On 6 December 2021, Alonso was appointed director of football at Pachuca. In June 2022, he stepped down for personal reasons.

Alonso joined fellow Mexican top-tier Cruz Azul on 13 December 2023, in the same capacity.

== Personal life ==
Alonso's younger brother, Matías, was also a footballer and a forward. He too began his career at River Plate.

His cousin Diego Alonso also played several years in Spain.

== Career statistics ==
=== Club ===
Appearances and goals by club, season and competition
Club	Season	League			National cup (Note: Includes Copa del Rey and Copa Argentina.)		Continental (Note: Includes UEFA Cup, Copa Libertadores, Copa Sudamericana and Recopa Sudamericana.)		Total	
Club	Season	Division	Apps	Goals	Apps	Goals	Apps	Goals	Apps	Goals
River Plate (UY)	1998	Primera División	7	3	—		—		7	3
River Plate (UY)	1999	Primera División	17	6	—		—		17	6
River Plate (UY)	Total		24	9	—		—		24	9
Alavés	2000–01	La Liga	32	8	1	0	11	5	44	13
Alavés	2001–02	La Liga	26	2	2	1	—		28	3
Alavés	2002–03	La Liga	37	6	4	1	3	0	44	7
Alavés	2003–04	Segunda División	21	5	6	0	—		27	5
Alavés	Total		116	21	13	2	14	5	143	28
Murcia	2004–05	Segunda División	41	11	1	0	—		42	11
Murcia	2005–06	Segunda División	34	8	1	1	—		35	9
Murcia	2006–07	Segunda División	40	14	—		—		40	14
Murcia	2007–08	La Liga	29	10	—		—		29	10
Murcia	2008–09	Segunda División	14	5	2	0	—		16	5
Murcia	Total		158	49	4	1	—		162	49
Espanyol	2008–09	La Liga	16	5	—		—		16	5
Espanyol	2009–10	La Liga	34	5	3	1	—		37	6
Espanyol	2010–11	La Liga	20	2	3	0	—		23	2
Espanyol	Total		70	12	6	1	—		76	13
Toluca	2011–12	Liga MX	34	25	—		—		34	25
Toluca	Total		34	25	—		—		34	25
Nacional	2012–13	Primera División	9	5	—		5	3	14	8
Nacional	2013–14	Primera División	23	15	—		4	1	27	16
Nacional	2014–15	Primera División	28	23	—		2	0	30	23
Nacional	2015–16	Primera División	13	8	—		2	0	15	8
Nacional	Total		73	51	—		13	4	86	55
River Plate	2016	Primera División	13	3	—		7	3	20	6
River Plate	2016–17	Primera División	14	0	3	1	3	0	19	1
River Plate	Total		27	7	3	1	10	3	39	7
Career total			517	170	26	5	37	12	581	187

You can copy either version. The second one is closer to current English Wikipedia standards for footballer articles.

== Honours ==
Alavés

- UEFA Cup runner-up: 2000–01

Nacional

- Uruguayan Primera División: 2014–15

River Plate

- Copa Argentina: 2015–16
- Recopa Sudamericana: 2016

Individual

- Liga MX top scorer: Apertura 2011; joint-top scorer Clausura 2012
