= Ismael López (footballer, born 1978) =

Spanish footballer

Personal information
- Full name: Ismael Santiago López López
- Date of birth: 27 February 1978 (age 48)
- Place of birth: Jaén, Spain
- Height: 1.76 m (5 ft 9 1/2 in)
- Position: Attacking midfielder

Youth career
- 1985–1993: Granada 74
- 1993–1996: Barcelona

Senior career*
Years	Team	Apps	(Gls)
1995–1996	Barcelona C	14	(2)
1996–1998	Barcelona B	28	(2)
1998–1999	Alavés	2	(0)
1999	→ Logroñés (loan)	21	(1)
1999–2000	Granada	34	(14)
2000–2001	Extremadura	38	(5)
2001–2003	Murcia	69	(12)
2003–2005	Betis	36	(1)
2005	→ Elche (loan)	21	(0)
2005–2007	Xerez	54	(3)
2007–2008	Hércules	32	(6)
2008–2009	Alicante	36	(1)
2010	Sporting Mahonés	11	(1)
2010–2011	Pierikos	28	(0)
Total		424	(48)

International career
1996	Spain U18	6	(1)
- * Club domestic league appearances and goals

Ismael Santiago López López (born 27 February 1978), sometimes known simply as Ismael, is a Spanish retired footballer who played mainly as an attacking midfielder.

During ten seasons, he amassed Segunda División totals of 276 matches and 28 goals in representation of eight clubs, mainly Murcia and Xerez (two years apiece).

== Club career ==
Born in Jaén, Andalusia, López started playing for FC Barcelona's B-team, representing the side in the second and third divisions. He moved to Deportivo Alavés in 1998, making his La Liga debut on 25 October 1998 in a 0–1 home loss against CF Extremadura, but he was not very successful there, finishing the season with CD Logroñés also in the second level.

López's career blossomed at Real Murcia, and he was instrumental in the side's top flight promotion in his second season after scoring 11 goals. This prompted the interest of Real Betis, where he was an important attacking element in 2003–04, being however rarely used in the following campaign as the latter won the Copa del Rey and achieved qualification honours to the UEFA Champions League after finishing fourth.

Subsequently, López returned to division two, having stints with Elche CF, Xerez CD, Hércules CF and Alicante CF. From January–June 2010 he played in the third tier with CF Sporting Mahonés and, at 32, moved abroad for the first time in his career, signing with Pierikos of the Greek second division.

== Honours ==
Murcia

- Segunda División: 2002–03

Betis

- Copa del Rey: 2004–05
