= Nan Ribera =

Swiss footballer

Personal information
- Full name: Joan Ribera Masó
- Date of birth: 22 April 1975 (age 51)
- Place of birth: Girona, Spain
- Height: 1.78 m (5 ft 10 in)
- Position: Midfielder

Senior career*
Years	Team	Apps	(Gls)
1992–1995	Girona FC		
1995–1998	UE Figueres		
1998–1999	RCD Espanyol		
1999–2000	Deportivo Alavés		
2000–2001	RCD Espanyol		
2001–2003	UD Salamanca		
2003–2004	Girona FC		
- * Club domestic league appearances and goals

Joan "Nan" Ribera Masó (born 22 April 1975) is a Spanish former football midfielder.
