= Hasan Yiğit =

Turkish footballer

Personal information
- Full name: Hasan Yiğit
- Date of birth: 2 January 1975 (age 51)
- Place of birth: Istanbul, Turkey
- Height: 1.79 m (5 ft 10 in)
- Position: Midfielder

Senior career*
Years	Team	Apps	(Gls)
1994–2001	Gaziantepspor		
2001–2002	Kocaelispor		
2002–2004	Diyarbakırspor		
2004–2006	Ankaraspor	13	(0)
2006–2007	Bursaspor	30	(0)
2007–2008	Denizlispor	19	(4)
2008–2009	Sakaryaspor	23	(0)
2009–2011	Çaykur Rizespor	29	(0)
2011–2012	Güngörenspor	17	(0)
- * Club domestic league appearances and goals as of 5 November 2012 (UTC)

Hasan Yiğit (born 2 January 1975 in Istanbul) is a retired Turkish football midfielder. During his career, Yiğit played for Gaziantepspor, Kocaelispor, Diyarbakırspor, Ankaraspor, Bursaspor, Denizlispor, Sakaryaspor, Çaykur Rizespor and Güngörenspor.

== Honours ==
- Kocaelispor
  - Turkish Cup (1): 2002
