= Mané (football manager) =

Spanish football manager

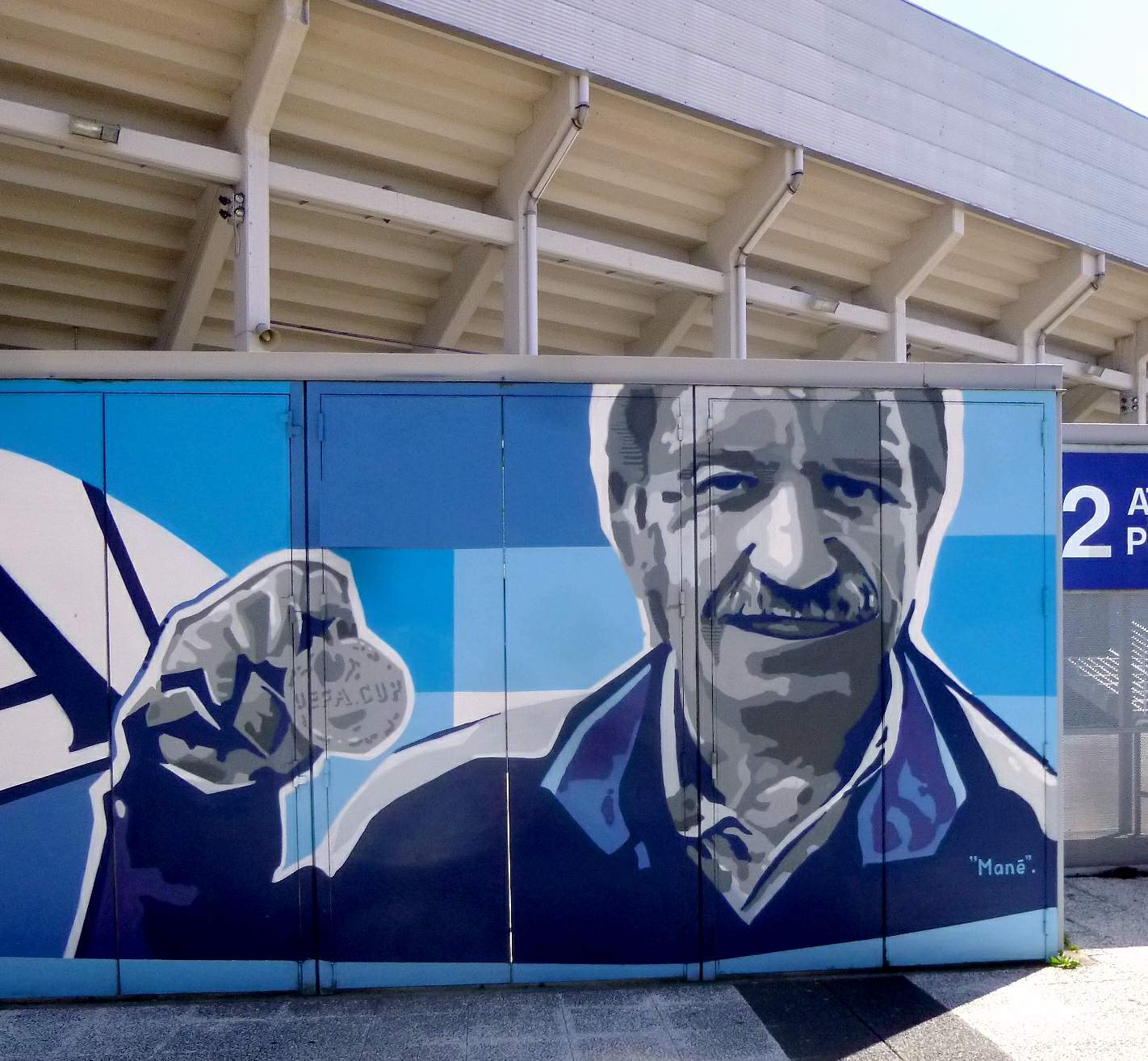
- Mané mural at Mendizorrotza Stadium

Personal information
- Full name: José Manuel Esnal Pardo
- Date of birth: 25 March 1950 (age 76)
- Place of birth: Balmaseda, Spain

Managerial career
- Years: Team
- 1979–1981: Balmaseda
- 1980–1981: Basque Country (youth)
- 1981–1982: Barakaldo
- 1982–1984: Sestao
- 1984–1985: Alavés
- 1985–1987: Figueres
- 1987–1988: Basque Country (youth)
- 1988–1995: Lleida
- 1995–1996: Mallorca
- 1996–1997: Levante
- 1997–2003: Alavés
- 2005–2006: Levante
- 2006–2007: Athletic Bilbao
- 2008–2009: Espanyol

José Manuel Esnal Pardo (born 25 March 1950), commonly known as Mané, is a Spanish football manager.

His career was mostly associated to Lleida and Alavés, coaching the latter in five La Liga seasons and taking them to the 2001 UEFA Cup final.

== Football career ==
=== Early years and Lleida ===
Born in Balmaseda, Basque Country, Mané started coaching in his late 20s, his first job being with his hometown club. Save for two years with UE Figueres, he worked exclusively in his native region during this time.

In 1988, Mané returned to Catalonia and joined UE Lleida, taking them from Segunda División B to La Liga in only four years. In 1993–94, the team's second-ever top flight experience, relegation befell after in spite of a 1–0 away win against FC Barcelona and a 2–1 victory over Real Madrid at the Camp d'Esports, with only five other wins during the season.

Lleida finished third in the Segunda División the following campaign, but lost in the subsequent promotion playoffs against Sporting de Gijón.

=== Alavés ===
After second division spells at RCD Mallorca (only 12 games) and Levante UD, Mané signed with Deportivo Alavés, returning to the club after coaching it in the 1984–85 season in the third division. In the first campaign in his second spell he led them to the league championship, adding a semi-final presence in the Copa del Rey after ousting Real Madrid in the round-of-16 and Deportivo de La Coruña in the quarter-finals.

In 1999–2000, with a side that included Basque Julio Salinas, Mané led Alavés to its best classification ever in the top flight, sixth, with qualification for the UEFA Cup as a result – season highlights included winning both matches against Barcelona (2–1 and 1–0) plus a 2–1 home defeat of eventual champions Deportivo. In the European campaign, the team reached the final after disposing of, amongst others, Inter Milan and fellow Spaniards Rayo Vallecano, meeting Liverpool in the decisive match: despite being 2–0 and 3–1 down, they embarked on a spirited comeback and took the game to extra time, eventually losing after an own goal by Delfí Geli; at the season's closure, he was voted Spanish Manager of the Year by magazine Don Balón.

Mané led Alavés to its second UEFA Cup qualification in 2001–02, with a seventh-place finish in the league. However, on 29 April 2003, he was sacked following a 3–0 away loss against Valencia CF, being replaced by Jesús Aranguren as the campaign ended in relegation after a five-year stay.

=== Late career ===
Mané helped another former team, Levante, promote to the top tier in 2006, after a one-year absence. In the following season, he returned to his native community after being appointed as Athletic Bilbao as a replacement for the sacked Félix Sarriugarte, with the Lions eventually ranking 17th, the lowest place outside the relegation zone. However, despite the club remaining in the main division he was not invited to continue in the role – Joaquín Caparrós was brought in as coach following the election of a new president (Fernando García Macua).

Mané's last job was in the 2008–09 campaign, as he was one of three coaches at RCD Espanyol who also eventually avoided top-division relegation.

== Honours ==
Figueres

- Segunda División B: 1985–86

Lleida

- Segunda División: 1992–93
- Segunda División B: 1989–90
- Copa Catalunya runner-up: 1992, 1999

Alavés

- Segunda División: 1997–98
- UEFA Cup runner-up: 2000–01
