= Iñaki Berruet =

Spanish footballer (born 1973)

Personal information
- Full name: José Ignacio Berruet Michelena
- Date of birth: 23 April 1973 (age 53)
- Place of birth: Irun, Spain
- Height: 1.85 m (6 ft 1 in)
- Position: Centre back

Youth career
- Real Unión

Senior career*
Years	Team	Apps	(Gls)
- Behovia
- Real Unión B
1990–1995	Real Unión	77	(5)
1996–1999	Deportivo Alavés	104	(1)
2000–2002	Villarreal	55	(1)
2003–2005	Córdoba	74	(3)
2005–2006	Lorca Deportiva	23	(0)
2006–2009	Real Unión	90	(4)
Total		423	(14)

International career
1998	Basque Country	1	(0)
- * Club domestic league appearances and goals

José Ignacio Berruet Michelena (born 23 April 1973) is a Spanish retired footballer who played as a centre back.

== Club career ==
Berruet was born in Irun, in the Bidasoaldea region of the province of Gipuzkoa in the Basque autonomous community, and began his career in the youth teams of Irun-based Real Unión. After spells with Behovia and Real Unión's B-team, he joined the Unión first team in 1990. They won back-to-back Tercera División group titles in 1991–92 and 1992–93, and on the second occasion also won promotion to Segunda División B. Berruet continued to play for the club in the third tier until the 1995–96 campaign, before joining Segunda División side Deportivo Alavés in January of that season.

Berruet played a key role as Alavés won the Segunda División title in 1997–98, earning promotion to La Liga in the process. He made his top flight debut on 20 September, as Alavés secured a 1–0 home win over Real Zaragoza at Mendizorrotza. He made 36 appearances over the following season and a half, before joining second tier Villarreal in January 2000. He won top flight promotion again at the end of that season, and made a further 45 La Liga appearances for Villarreal over two and a half seasons. He joined Córdoba in the Segunda División in February 2003.

With Córdoba suffering relegation at the end of the 2004–05 campaign, Berruet left to join Lorca Deportiva, who were moving in the opposite direction. He spent one season with Lorca before dropping a division himself, returning to his roots by rejoining Real Unión. He played for the club for the next three years, helping them win their Segunda División B group and earn promotion in his final season. He retired in 2009 at the age of 36.

== International career ==
Berruet received one cap for the Basque Country representative side, which came in a 5–1 win over Uruguay in 1998. He was never a call-up in the Spain national team.

== Honours ==
Real Unión

- Tercera División: 1991–92, 1992–93
- Segunda División B: 2008–09

Deportivo Alavés

- Segunda División: 1997–98

== Career statistics ==
As of 18 May 2021

Club	Season	League			Cup		Europe		Other		Total	
Club	Season	Division	Apps	Goals	Apps	Goals	Apps	Goals	Apps	Goals	Apps	Goals
Real Unión	1990–91	Tercera División	?	?	1	0	–		–		1	0
Real Unión	1992–93	Tercera División	?	?	2	0	–		–		2	0
Real Unión	1993–94	Segunda División B	28	4	–		–		–		28	4
Real Unión	1994–95	Segunda División B	31	0	–		–		–		31	0
Real Unión	1995–96	Segunda División B	18	1	2	0	–		–		20	1
Real Unión	Total		77	5	5	0	0	0	0	0	82	5
Deportivo Alavés	1995–96	Segunda División	6	0	0	0	–		–		6	0
Deportivo Alavés	1996–97	Segunda División	27	0	2	0	–		–		29	0
Deportivo Alavés	1997–98	Segunda División	35	1	10	0	–		–		45	1
Deportivo Alavés	1998–99	La Liga	31	0	2	0	–		–		33	0
Deportivo Alavés	1999–2000	La Liga	5	0	3	0	–		–		8	0
Deportivo Alavés	Total		104	1	17	0	0	0	0	0	121	1
Villarreal	1999–2000	Segunda División	10	1	0	0	–		–		10	1
Villarreal	2000–01	La Liga	27	0	1	0	–		–		28	0
Villarreal	2001–02	La Liga	9	0	4	0	–		–		13	0
Villarreal	2002–03	La Liga	9	0	0	0	2	0	–		11	0
Villarreal	Total		55	1	5	0	2	0	0	0	62	1
Córdoba	2002–03	Segunda División	16	1	0	0	–		–		16	1
Córdoba	2003–04	Segunda División	37	0	2	0	–		–		39	0
Córdoba	2004–05	Segunda División	21	2	1	0	–		–		22	2
Córdoba	Total		74	3	3	0	0	0	0	0	77	3
Lorca Deportiva	2005–06	Segunda División	23	0	0	0	–		–		23	0
Real Unión	2006–07	Segunda División B	32	2	2	0	–		2	0	36	2
Real Unión	2007–08	Segunda División B	30	0	3	1	–		–		33	1
Real Unión	2008–09	Segunda División B	28	2	5	0	–		6	0	39	2
Real Unión	Total		90	4	10	1	0	0	8	0	108	5
Real Unión total			167	9	15	1	0	0	8	0	190	10
Career total			423	14	40	1	2	0	8	0	473	15

1. Appearances in the 2002 UEFA Intertoto Cup
2. Appearances in the 2007 Segunda División B play-offs
3. Appearances in the 2009 Segunda División B play-offs
