= Pablo Gómez (footballer) =

Spanish footballer and manager

Personal information
- Full name: Pablo Gómez Ortiz de Guzmán
- Date of birth: 21 May 1970 (age 56)
- Place of birth: Vitoria, Spain
- Height: 1.73 m (5 ft 8 in)
- Position: Midfielder

Team information
- Current team: Alavés (youth)

Youth career
- Aurrerá

Senior career*
Years	Team	Apps	(Gls)
1989–1992	Lleida	104	(5)
1992–1994	Rayo Vallecano	71	(5)
1994–1995	Valladolid	28	(3)
1995–1996	Alavés	34	(10)
1996–1997	Levante	35	(6)
1997–2004	Alavés	222	(18)
2004–2005	Ciudad Murcia	17	(0)
Total		511	(47)

International career
1990	Spain U19	3	(1)
1991–1992	Spain U21	2	(0)

Managerial career
- 2007–2008: Alavés (youth)
- 2008–2009: Alavés B
- 2009: Alavés (assistant)
- 2012–: Alavés (youth)
- * Club domestic league appearances and goals

Pablo Gómez Ortiz de Guzmán (born 21 May 1970) is a Spanish former professional footballer who played as a midfielder. He was also a manager.

A penalty kick and set piece specialist, he amassed La Liga totals of 252 games and 16 goals over nine seasons, with Rayo Vallecano, Valladolid and Alavés, appearing in 295 competitive matches in his two spells with the latter club and reaching the 2001 UEFA Cup final. He added 229 appearances and 30 goals in the Segunda División, in representation of four teams.

== Playing career ==
Born in Vitoria-Gasteiz, Álava, Gómez started his professional career in 1990 with UE Lleida, which he represented for two Segunda División seasons. In summer 1992 he signed with Rayo Vallecano, making his La Liga debut on 5 September by playing 67 minutes in a 1–0 away loss against Valencia CF. His first goal in the latter competition arrived on 16 May 1993, in the 2–2 home draw with CD Tenerife.

After appearing in 35 games (four goals) during the 1993–94 campaign, Gómez also featured in the promotion play-offs against SD Compostela, lost 3–1 on aggregate. He nonetheless stayed in the top flight, joining Real Valladolid.

Gómez spent eight of the following nine years with Deportivo Alavés, scoring a career-best ten goals in 1995–96 and 1997–98, competing in both cases in the second tier and winning his only piece of silverware in the latter season. He continued to be an important midfield element for the Basques subsequently, contributing to a best-ever sixth-place finish in 1999–2000 with one goal from 34 appearances. The following campaign, he played eight matches in the team's runner-up run in the UEFA Cup, coming on as a 64th-minute substitute for two-time scorer Javi Moreno in the final against Liverpool, lost 5–4 in extra time.

After being relegated in 2003, the 33-year-old Gómez resumed his career in division two, retiring after one season apiece with Alavés and Ciudad de Murcia.

== Coaching career ==
In 2007, Gómez returned to Alavés after the election of president Fernando Ortiz de Zárate, being named coach of the youth sides. The following year, he was promoted to the reserves in the Tercera División.

On 12 February 2009, after Javi López was appointed at the helm of the first team, Gómez was named his assistant. The pair were not able, however, to prevent second-division relegation.

Gómez returned to Alavés' youths in June 2012.

== Honours ==
Alavés

- Segunda División: 1997–98
- UEFA Cup runner-up: 2000–01
