= Kike Burgos =

Spanish footballer and coach

Personal information
- Full name: Enrique Burgos Carrasco
- Date of birth: 20 January 1971 (age 55)
- Place of birth: Barakaldo, Spain
- Height: 1.89 m (6 ft 2 1/2 in)
- Position: Goalkeeper

Youth career
- Athletic Bilbao

Senior career*
Years	Team	Apps	(Gls)
1989–1991	Bilbao Athletic	69	(0)
1991–1995	Athletic Bilbao	24	(0)
1995–1998	Mallorca	81	(0)
1998–2002	Alavés	43	(0)
2002–2007	Poli Ejido	181	(0)
Total		398	(0)

International career
1989–1990	Spain U20	3	(0)
1990–1991	Spain U21	6	(0)
1991	Spain U23	4	(0)

Managerial career
- 2012–2013: Villarreal (assistant)
- 2013–2014: Murcia (assistant)
- * Club domestic league appearances and goals

Enrique "Kike" Burgos Carrasco (born 20 January 1971) is a Spanish former professional footballer who played as a goalkeeper.

== Club career ==
Born in Barakaldo, Basque Country, Burgos was a youth product of local giants Athletic Bilbao. He played 317 games in the Segunda División over the course of nine seasons, with Polideportivo Ejido (five years), Bilbao Athletic and RCD Mallorca (two apiece); during his spell at the latter, he took part in most of the matches in 1996–97 in a promotion to La Liga via the playoffs against Rayo Vallecano, but subsequently lost his place to Carlos Roa.

Burgos retired in June 2007, at the age of 36. He later worked as assistant at Villarreal CF and Real Murcia CF under Julio Velázquez, being goalkeeper coach at Real Betis with the same manager but dismissed after a quarrel with Antonio Adán.

== Career statistics ==
Appearances and goals by club, season and competition
Club	Season	League			National cup		Europe		Other		Total	
Club	Season	Division	Apps	Goals	Apps	Goals	Apps	Goals	Apps	Goals	Apps	Goals
Bilbao Athletic	1989–90	Segunda División	33	0	—		—		—		33	0
Bilbao Athletic	1990–91	Segunda División	36	0	—		—		—		36	0
Bilbao Athletic	Total		69	0	—		—		—		69	0
Athletic Bilbao	1990–91	La Liga	1	0	2	0	—		—		3	0
Athletic Bilbao	1991–92	La Liga	22	0	2	0	—		—		24	0
Athletic Bilbao	1992–93	La Liga	0	0	2	0	—		—		2	0
Athletic Bilbao	1993–94	La Liga	1	0	1	0	—		—		2	0
Athletic Bilbao	1994–95	La Liga	0	0	0	0	0	0	—		0	0
Athletic Bilbao	Total		24	0	7	0	0	0	—		31	0
Mallorca	1995–96	Segunda División	31	0	3	0	—		2	0	36	0
Mallorca	1996–97	Segunda División	36	0	3	0	—		2	0	41	0
Mallorca	1997–98	La Liga	14	0	5	0	—		—		19	0
Mallorca	Total		81	0	11	0	—		4	0	96	0
Alavés	1998–99	La Liga	20	0	2	0	—		—		22	0
Alavés	1999–2000	La Liga	0	0	3	0	—		—		3	0
Alavés	2000–01	La Liga	3	0	1	0	0	0	—		4	0
Alavés	2001–02	La Liga	20	0	0	0	—		—		20	0
Alavés	Total		43	0	6	0	0	0	—		49	0
Poli Ejido	2002–03	Segunda División	40	0	0	0	—		—		40	0
Poli Ejido	2003–04	Segunda División	34	0	0	0	—		—		34	0
Poli Ejido	2004–05	Segunda División	38	0	0	0	—		—		38	0
Poli Ejido	2005–06	Segunda División	31	0	1	0	—		—		32	0
Poli Ejido	2006–07	Segunda División	38	0	0	0	—		—		38	0
Poli Ejido	Total		181	0	1	0	—		—		182	0
Career total			398	0	25	0	0	0	4	0	427	0
