= Javi Moreno (footballer, born 1974) =

Spanish footballer

Personal information
- Full name: Javier Moreno Valera
- Date of birth: 10 September 1974 (age 52)
- Place of birth: Silla, Spain
- Height: 1.80 m (5 ft 11 in)
- Position: Striker

Team information
- Current team: Intercity (manager)

Youth career
- Silla
- 1990–1994: Barcelona

Senior career*
Years	Team	Apps	(Gls)
1994–1996	Barcelona C	19	(9)
1996	Barcelona B	10	(5)
1996–1997	Córdoba	15	(0)
1997	Yeclano	16	(6)
1998–2001	Alavés	82	(30)
1998–1999	→ Numancia (loan)	39	(18)
2001–2002	Milan	16	(2)
2002–2004	Atlético Madrid	36	(7)
2004	→ Bolton Wanderers (loan)	8	(0)
2004–2005	Zaragoza	18	(4)
2005–2008	Córdoba	94	(48)
2008–2009	Ibiza	14	(2)
2009	Lucena	8	(1)
Total		368	(130)

International career
1992–1993	Spain U18	16	(10)
2001	Spain	5	(1)

Managerial career
- 2014–2015: Utiel
- 2015–2016: Novelda
- 2016: Alcorcón B
- 2018–2019: Córdoba (youth)
- 2019–2020: Pozoblanco
- 2020–2021: Ejea
- 2021–2022: Badalona
- 2022–2023: Tarazona
- 2023–2024: Numancia
- 2024–2025: Linense
- 2025–: Intercity
- * Club domestic league appearances and goals

Javier Moreno Valera (born 10 September 1974) is a Spanish professional football coach and a former striker who is the manager of Segunda Federación club Intercity.

Best known for his Alavés stint, he amassed totals of 118 matches and 38 goals in La Liga, where he also represented Atlético Madrid and Zaragoza. He had brief spells with Milan in Serie A and Bolton Wanderers of the Premier League, with little impact.

Moreno, who earned five caps for Spain in 2001, later managed in the lower divisions.

== Club career ==
=== Early years and Alavés ===
Born in Silla, Valencian Community, Moreno made his professional debuts with Barcelona's B-team. After stints with lowly Córdoba and Yeclano he first joined Alavés in January 1998, with the Basque team competing in Segunda División.

After being instrumental in Numancia's first ever La Liga promotion in 1999, Moreno returned to Alavés, shooting to prominence during his second spell after playing a pivotal role in their run to the 2001 UEFA Cup final. Along the way, defeated were the likes of Gaziantepspor, Lillestrøm, Rosenborg, Inter Milan, fellow league club Rayo Vallecano and Kaiserslautern, before an eventual 4–5 extra time loss to Liverpool in the decisive match, where he scored two goals in three minutes (he also finished the league season with 22 successful strikes, good enough for third).

=== Abroad ===
Moreno's performances and goals during 2000–01 convinced Serie A side A.C. Milan to buy him, amid attention from Europe's other elite clubs. However, he struggled immensely in his sole campaign in Italy, returning to his country to join Atlético Madrid who had just returned to the top flight.

With goals hard to come by, a January 2004 loan move to Bolton Wanderers ensued but, after eight goalless appearances for The Trotters, including one in the final of the Football League Cup against Middlesbrough, Moreno found himself on the move again, this time to Real Zaragoza, where he appeared sparingly.

=== Return to Spain ===
Moreno refound his goalscoring form for old acquaintance Córdoba in July 2005, helping them to promotion to the second division in 2007 while finishing the Segunda División B top scorer with 24 goals in 32 appearances. After three years he was released, subsequently joining SE Eivissa-Ibiza in the third level; as he did not play the number of minutes he was expecting upon signing, he announced his retirement in December 2008. Roughly one year after, he returned to active aged 35, joining another club in division three, Lucena, and retiring for good at the season's end.

== International career ==
Moreno played five games for Spain in 2001, scoring once. His debut came on 28 February against England, in a friendly match played in Birmingham (0–3 loss) where he had a penalty saved by Nigel Martyn.

On 2 June, a mere seconds after having come on as a substitute for Luis Enrique, Moreno netted the nation's second goal in an eventual 4–1 home win over Bosnia and Herzegovina for the 2002 FIFA World Cup qualifiers.

== Coaching career ==
Moreno began his coaching career with two amateur clubs in his birth region, Utiel – where his father and grandfather had played – and Novelda. On 23 September 2016, he was named as Alcorcón B manager after replacing Óscar Mena, but was dismissed before the turn of the year. In 2018–19, he managed the youths of former employer Córdoba, leaving with a parting shot against the ownership for the state of the training facilities.

After 13 months in charge of Pozoblanco in the Tercera División, Moreno moved up to the third division for the first time in his coaching career, at Ejea in November 2020. Nearly a year later, he was hired at Badalona; following their relegation from Segunda Federación in June 2022, he remained in the division at Tarazona.

Moreno led the Aragonese club into Primera Federación, their first ever experience of the third tier, having defeated Navalcarnero 3–2 on aggregate in the playoff final in June 2023. He immediately chose to stay in the previous league, at relegated Numancia.

== Career statistics ==
=== International ===
#	Date	Venue	Opponent	Score	Result	Competition
1	2 June 2001	Carlos Tartiere, Oviedo, Spain	Bosnia and Herzegovina	2–1	4–1	2002 World Cup qualification

== Honours ==
Alavés

- Segunda División: 1997–98
- UEFA Cup runner-up: 2000–01

Bolton Wanderers

- Football League Cup runner-up: 2003–04

Zaragoza

- Supercopa de España: 2004

Individual

- Segunda División B Top Scorer: 2006–07
