= Asier Salcedo =

Spanish footballer

Personal information
- Full name: Asier Salcedo Borrega
- Date of birth: 9 April 1980 (age 46)
- Place of birth: Vitoria, Spain
- Height: 1.80 m (5 ft 11 in)
- Position: Midfielder

Senior career*
| Years | Team | Apps | (Gls) |
| 1999–2002 | Alavés B | 102 | (16) |
| 2000–2001 | Alavés | 5 | (0) |
| 2002–2003 | Alicante | 31 | (3) |
| 2003–2005 | Pontevedra | 51 | (4) |
| 2005–2007 | Ponferradina | 66 | (6) |
| 2007–2008 | Logroñés | 36 | (10) |
| 2008–2010 | Real Unión | 47 | (0) |
| 2010–2013 | Alavés | 74 | (4) |
| 2013 | Portugalete | 12 | (0) |
| Total | | 424 | (43) |
- * Club domestic league appearances and goals

Asier Salcedo Borrega (born 9 April 1980 in Vitoria-Gasteiz, Álava) is a Spanish former footballer who played as a midfielder.
