= Antonio Karmona =

Spanish footballer

Personal information
- Full name: Antonio Karmona Herrera
- Date of birth: 24 March 1968 (age 58)
- Place of birth: Bermeo, Spain
- Height: 1.76 m (5 ft 9 in)
- Position: Defender

Youth career
- Bermeo

Senior career*
Years	Team	Apps	(Gls)
1990–1995	Sestao	159	(9)
1995–1996	Eibar	37	(1)
1996–2003	Alavés	231	(7)
2003–2005	Eibar	61	(4)
Total		488	(21)

International career
1999–2003	Basque Country	5	(0)
- * Club domestic league appearances and goals

Antonio Karmona Herrera (born 24 March 1968) is a Spanish former professional footballer who played as a defender.

He was best known for his Alavés stint, where he spent seven seasons and totalled 260 competitive matches, also being the undisputed team captain.

Most of Karmona's career was spent, however, in the Segunda División, where he amassed totals of 260 games and 11 goals over the course of eight seasons, representing three clubs including his main one.

== Club career ==
Karmona was born in Bermeo, Basque Country. At the age of 22, he was playing amateur football in his hometown and preparing to become a fisherman like his father and many others from the town, but instead was invited to join the senior ranks of local Sestao Sport Club.

Karmona played in the Segunda División with Sestao for the first three seasons out of five he spent with the team from the 'left bank' – they were relegated in 1993 and promoted back in 1995, amidst financial problems which would soon see them dissolved and refounded in the lower leagues. By then he had moved on to SD Eibar, where he spent one year before moving to another club from the same region and level, Deportivo Alavés; in his second season with the latter, he contributed 40 appearances (3,600 minutes, with three goals) as they returned to La Liga after an absence of more than 40 years.

Having appeared in all 38 league matches in the 1998–99 campaign, Karmona captained Alavés to the 2000–01 final of the UEFA Cup, where they met Liverpool and eventually lost 5–4 due to an own golden goal by Delfí Geli, with him being sent off during extra time. In an interview before the game, he revealed he was a lifelong Liverpool fan.

After suffering relegation, the 35-year-old Karmona re-joined Eibar and played two more second-tier seasons before retiring. Subsequently, he worked with Athletic Bilbao's coaching and scouting staff for some time.

== International career ==
Karmona won five caps for the Basque Country unofficial representative team. In 2003, his last appearance, he became the first Eibar player to be selected.

== Honours ==
Alavés

- Segunda División: 1997–98
