= Raúl Gañán =

Spanish footballer (born 1974)

Personal information
- Full name: Raúl Gañán Bermúdez
- Date of birth: 20 December 1974 (age 51)
- Place of birth: Bilbao, Spain
- Height: 1.76 m (5 ft 9 1/2 in)
- Position: Right back

Youth career
- Athletic Bilbao

Senior career*
Years	Team	Apps	(Gls)
1994–1997	Bilbao Athletic	29	(0)
1995–1996	→ Durango (loan)	32	(0)
1997–1998	Barakaldo	34	(2)
1998–2001	Alavés	18	(1)
1999	→ Badajoz (loan)	21	(1)
2001–2010	Salamanca	298	(3)
2010–2011	Eibar	34	(0)
Total		466	(7)
- * Club domestic league appearances and goals

Raúl Gañán Bermúdez (born 20 December 1974) is a Spanish retired professional footballer who played as a right back.

Over the course of nine seasons, he appeared in 285 Segunda División games, mainly with Salamanca (four goals scored). In La Liga he competed with Alavés, being only a reserve player.

== Club career ==
Born in Bilbao, Biscay, Gañán started with hometown's Athletic Bilbao, but never made it past their reserves. His professional debut was made with lowly Barakaldo CF also in the Basque region, in Segunda División B.

Gañán then spent three years with Deportivo Alavés, then on the verge of La Liga and European consolidation. However, barred by Cosmin Contra and Delfí Geli in successive seasons, he could never establish himself in the starting XI; during his stint, he was also loaned for five months to Segunda División club CD Badajoz.

In 2001, Gañán joined UD Salamanca in division two, being an undisputed starter from the very beginning – incidentally, in the year he appeared in the fewest games, 17 in the 2004–05 campaign, the team was relegated, but promoted the very next year – going on to make more than 300 official appearances for the Castile and León side.

Aged nearly 36, and after again having contributed heavily to Salamanca staying in division two (38 matches, 37 complete), Gañán returned to his native region, signing for third-tier SD Eibar.

== Honours ==
Alavés

- UEFA Cup runner-up: 2000–01

Salamanca

- Segunda División B: 2005–06
