= Magno (footballer, born 1974) =

Brazilian footballer

Personal information
- Full name: Magno Mocelin
- Date of birth: 26 February 1974 (age 52)
- Place of birth: Curitiba, Brazil
- Height: 1.74 m (5 ft 9 in)
- Position: Forward

Senior career*
Years	Team	Apps	(Gls)
1994	Flamengo	21	(5)
1995–1996	Grêmio	13	(0)
1996–1998	Groningen	48	(19)
1998–2004	Alavés	181	(22)
2004–2005	De Graafschap	22	(4)
2005–2008	Omonia	58	(17)
2008–2009	AEK Larnaca	25	(1)
Total		368	(68)
- * Club domestic league appearances and goals

Magno Mocelin (born 26 February 1974), known as Magno, is a Brazilian former professional footballer who played as a forward.

His 15-year professional career, which was spent in four countries, was mainly associated with Alavés in Spain, for which he appeared in 208 official games and played in one UEFA Cup final. Furthermore in 1995 he was a substitute at the Intercontinental Cup for Gremio against Ajax and scored a penalty in the penalty shoot-out.

== Club career ==
Born in Curitiba, Paraná, Magno started playing professionally with Clube de Regatas do Flamengo and Grêmio Foot-Ball Porto Alegrense. He moved overseas in 1996, spending three seasons with Dutch Eredivisie club FC Groningen and being relegated at the end of his last.

Aged 24, Magno joined La Liga side Deportivo Alavés for the 1998–99 campaign, remaining six years with the Basques and playing an important attacking role (mainly as a substitute as the team reached the 2001 final of the UEFA Cup which was lost to Liverpool in extra time, where he was sent off). He subsequently returned to the Netherlands, signing for De Graafschap.

After a season back in the Netherlands with De Graafschap – also relegated from the top level – Magno started a Cypriot adventure in 2005, first playing with AC Omonia. On 6 June 2008, he moved to fellow First Division side AEK Larnaca FC on a one-year contract.
