= Martín Herrera =

Argentine footballer

Personal information
- Full name: Martín Horacio Herrera
- Date of birth: 13 September 1970 (age 56)
- Place of birth: Río Cuarto, Argentina
- Height: 1.84 m (6 ft 0 in)
- Position: Goalkeeper

Youth career
- 1978–1987: Estudiantes Río Cuarto
- 1987–1990: Boca Juniors

Senior career*
| Years | Team | Apps | (Gls) |
| 1990–1996 | Boca Juniors | 0 | (0) |
| 1996–1997 | Atlanta | 66 | (0) |
| 1997–1998 | Toluca | 5 | (0) |
| 1998–1999 | Ferro Carril Oeste | 34 | (0) |
| 1999–2002 | Alavés | 94 | (0) |
| 2002–2005 | Fulham | 2 | (0) |
| 2003–2005 | → Estudiantes LP (loan) | 40 | (0) |
| 2005–2006 | Estudiantes LP | 37 | (0) |
| 2007–2009 | Estudiantes Río Cuarto | 26 | (0) |
| Total | | 233 | (0) |
- * Club domestic league appearances and goals

Martín Horacio Herrera (born 13 September 1970) is an Argentine former professional footballer who played as a goalkeeper.

== Club career ==
=== Boca Juniors ===
Born in Río Cuarto, Córdoba, Herrera started his senior career with Argentine giants Boca Juniors in 1991 after signing from his local club Estudiantes de Río Cuarto. During his tenure, he played understudy to the likes of Carlos Navarro Montoya; on 16 May 1993, in a reserve game against Club Atlético Independiente, a clash with an opponent resulted in head trauma, a depressed cheekbone, orbital fracture and torn ligaments, which sidelined him for nine months.

=== Journeyman ===
Subsequently, Herrera joined Club Atlético Atlanta of the Primera B Metropolitana. He then had brief spells with Deportivo Toluca FC (Mexico) and Ferro Carril Oeste, leaving the latter after not being paid for several months.

=== Alavés ===
On 8 July 1999, Herrera moved to the Spanish La Liga after signing a three-year contract with Deportivo Alavés for 200 million pesetas. He was an undisputed starter in his first year, being awarded the Ricardo Zamora Trophy with only 37 goals conceded (all 38 matches played), which was good enough to qualify to the UEFA Cup after the sixth-place finish.

Herrera continued to be first choice for the Basques in the following season, but was also briefly suspended by the Royal Spanish Football Federation for allegedly holding a false Italian passport. He later succeeded in proving his origins, and helped his team reach the final of the UEFA Cup on 16 May 2001, a 5–4 extra time loss against Liverpool after an own golden goal.

=== Fulham ===
In May 2002, Herrera agreed to a three-year deal at Fulham. A backup to Edwin van der Sar and Maik Taylor, he only made his Premier League debut on 24 February 2003 in a 1–1 away draw to Tottenham Hotspur as a substitute, after Taylor was sent off.

Herrera's second and final competitive appearance took place on 16 March 2003, when he started in the 2–2 draw against Southampton at Craven Cottage.

=== Estudiantes LP ===
Herrera returned to his country and its Primera División on 17 July 2003, being loaned to Estudiantes de La Plata. Initially a starter, he lost his spot to Mariano Andújar after being sent off in a 0–2 loss at Boca Juniors in September 2006, never being selected again by manager Diego Simeone before terminating his contract the following month; nonetheless, he was part of the squad that won that year's Apertura championship, defeating the same opposition in the championship playoff.

=== Estudiantes RC ===
After one year out of football, the 37-year-old Herrera returned to activity with his first club Estudiantes Río Cuarto. He retired in 2009.

== Honours ==
Toluca

- Liga MX: 1998 Torneo Verano

Estudiantes La Plata

- Argentine Primera División: 2006 Apertura

Individual

- Ricardo Zamora Trophy: 1999–2000
