= Ibon Begoña =

Spanish footballer (born 1973)

Personal information
- Full name: Ibon Begoña Zubiaur
- Date of birth: 17 November 1973 (age 52)
- Place of birth: Bilbao, Spain
- Height: 1.81 m (5 ft 11 in)
- Position: Left-back

Senior career*
Years	Team	Apps	(Gls)
1993–1994	Lemona	28	(4)
1994	Sestao	15	(3)
1995–1997	Bilbao Athletic	72	(4)
1997–2004	Alavés	197	(6)
2004–2005	Gimnàstic	18	(2)
2006	Alavés	4	(0)
2006–2007	Logroñés	34	(0)
2007–2009	Ibiza-Eivissa	57	(0)
2013–2014	Ciudad Ibiza		
Total		425	(19)

Managerial career
- 2012–2013: Atlético Isleño (assistant)
- 2015–2017: Ciudad Ibiza
- * Club domestic league appearances and goals

Ibon Begoña Zubiaur (born 17 November 1973) is a Spanish former professional footballer who played as a left-back.

== Career ==
Born in Bilbao, Basque Country, Begoña amassed La Liga totals of 145 games and five goals over the course of six seasons, in representation of Deportivo Alavés. He spent a total of eight years with the club in two separate spells and, in the 2000–01 campaign, contributed ten appearances in the team's runner-up run in the UEFA Cup, scoring in the 3–1 away win against Lillestrøm SK for the second round.

Other than with Alavés, Begoña played professionally in Segunda División with Bilbao Athletic and Gimnàstic de Tarragona, retiring in June 2009 at the age of 35 after two years with lowly UD Ibiza-Eivissa, with which he later worked as director of football. In late 2013, the 40-year-old returned to active with Ciudad de Ibiza CF in the Mallorca regional championships, going on to begin working as a coach also with that club.

In the summer of 2017, after Ciudad merged with UD Ibiza, a highly critical Begoña abandoned the project where he also acted as an investor.

== Personal life ==
Begoña's younger brother, Iker, was also a footballer and a defender.

== Honours ==
Alavés

- Segunda División: 1997–98
- UEFA Cup runner-up: 2000–01
