= Jorge Azkoitia =

Spanish footballer (born 1974)

Personal information
- Full name: Jorge Azkoitia Gabiola
- Date of birth: 27 April 1974 (age 52)
- Place of birth: Bilbao, Spain
- Height: 1.82 m (5 ft 11 1/2 in)
- Position: Defensive midfielder

Senior career*
Years	Team	Apps	(Gls)
1993–1996	Sestao	50	(2)
1996–2001	Alavés	111	(10)
2001–2004	Rayo Vallecano	67	(6)
2004–2005	Elche	35	(2)
2005–2006	Eibar	35	(11)
2006–2009	Alicante	98	(15)
Total		396	(46)
- * Club domestic league appearances and goals

Jorge Azkoitia Gabiola (born 27 April 1974) is a Spanish former professional footballer who played as a defensive midfielder.

== Club career ==
Born in Bilbao, Biscay, Azkoitia started playing professionally with local Sestao Sport Club in the Segunda División B, but eventually helped to the club's promotion to Segunda División. However, the team were relegated in 1996, and he signed with Basque neighbours Deportivo Alavés.

At Alavés, Azkoitia proved essential in the 1997–98 season, appearing in 39 games and scoring three goals in an eventual La Liga return after a four-decade absence. He was relatively used the following years, but had few opportunities in the 2000–01 campaign as the side achieved an historical runner-up position in the UEFA Cup; on 6 May 2000, his 87th-minute header marked their first-ever win against Real Madrid at the Santiago Bernabéu Stadium (1–0).

Azkoitia joined Rayo Vallecano in summer 2001, being scarcely played in his first season. He was an important first-team element in the next two, but the Madrilenians dropped two consecutive divisions and he was sent off four times.

Subsequently, Azkoitia served second-division spells at Elche CF and SD Eibar. In 2005–06 he netted a career-best 11 goals, but suffered relegation with the latter. He then moved to Alicante CF for the following season, helping to a 2008 promotion to the second tier.

In the 2008–09 campaign, Azkoitia was once again instrumental for Alicante by scoring nine times in 33 league games, but the Valencians were immediately relegated. He retired from football at the age of 35, with professional totals of 310 matches and 39 goals.

== Honours ==
Alavés

- Segunda División: 1997–98
