= Delfí Geli =

Spanish footballer and football club president

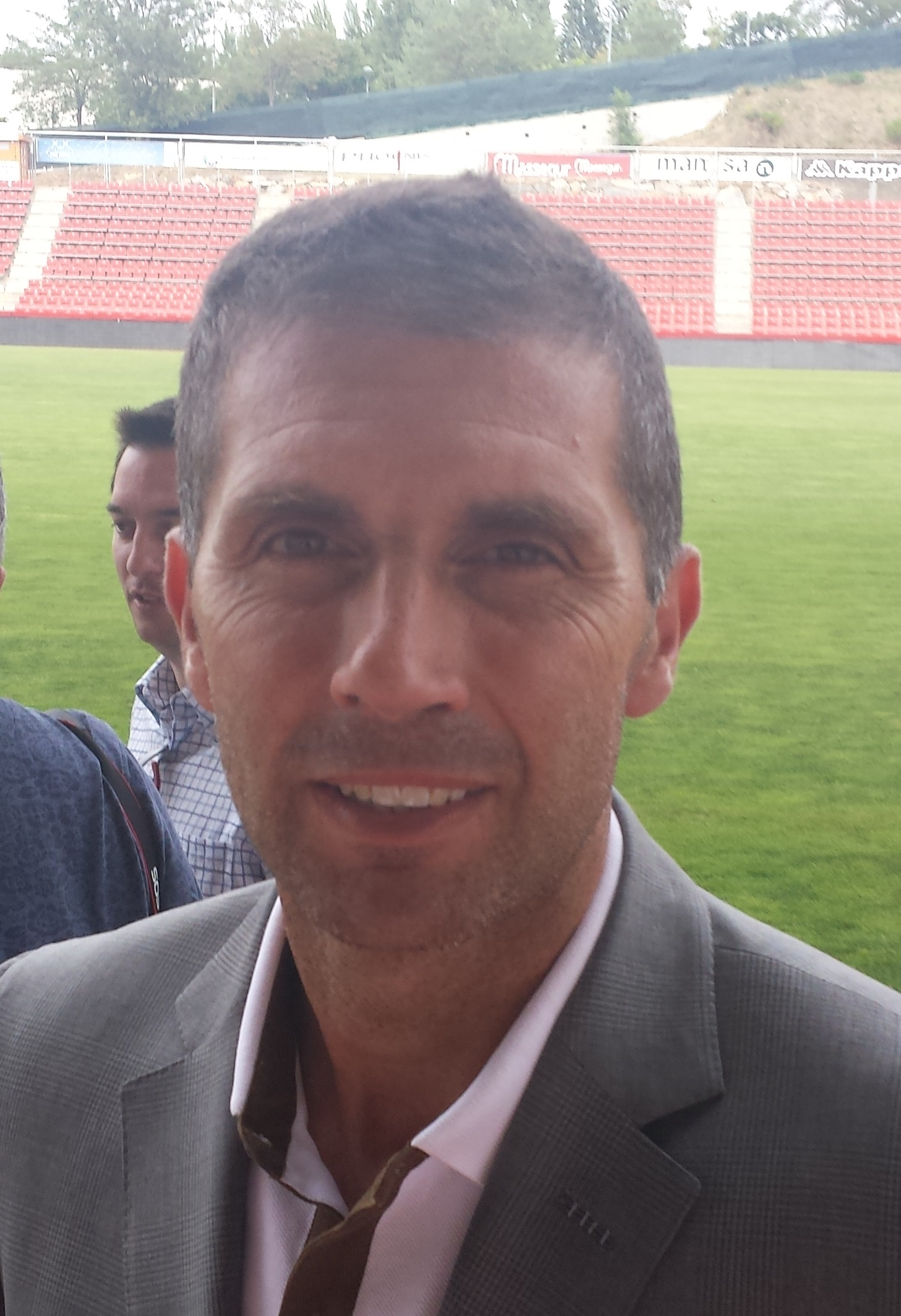
- Geli in 2015

Personal information
- Full name: Delfí Geli i Roura
- Date of birth: 22 April 1969 (age 57)
- Place of birth: Salt, Spain
- Height: 1.81 m (5 ft 11 in)
- Position: Right-back

Youth career
- 1984–1986: Salt
- 1986–1987: Coma Cros

Senior career*
Years	Team	Apps	(Gls)
1987–1989	Girona	20	(3)
1989–1991	Barcelona B	65	(20)
1990–1992	Barcelona	1	(0)
1991–1992	→ Albacete (loan)	32	(0)
1992–1994	Albacete	71	(9)
1994–1999	Atlético Madrid	139	(9)
1999–2000	Albacete	23	(6)
2000–2003	Alavés	100	(5)
2003–2005	Girona	60	(6)
Total		511	(58)

International career
1992–1993	Spain	4	(0)
2000–2002	Catalonia	2	(0)
- * Club domestic league appearances and goals

Delfí Geli i Roura (born 22 April 1969) is a Spanish former professional footballer who played as a right-back. He is currently president of Segunda División club Girona.

== Club career ==
Born in Salt, Girona, Catalonia, Geli began his professional career as a forward, while playing for Girona and Barcelona (he only appeared once for the latter's first team in La Liga, in a 0–0 home draw against Real Oviedo on 31 January 1990). He reconverted to right-back at Albacete, signing with the Castilla–La Mancha club in the summer of 1991 and playing 32 games in its first-ever season in the top division.

In 1994–95, having scored a total of nine league goals for Albacete in his last two seasons, Geli joined Atlético Madrid. He was instrumental as the capital side claimed the double in the following campaign, playing 49 matches in all competitions and scoring twice.

After a second spell with Albacete, now in the Segunda División, the 31-year-old Geli moved to Alavés in 2000, making 35 appearances in his first year as the Basques finished in tenth position. While taking part in that season's UEFA Cup final, he scored the decisive goal – an own golden goal which made the score 5–4 to opponents Liverpool.

Geli returned to his first senior club in 2003, and retired two seasons later in the Segunda División B, having amassed professional totals of 366 games and 29 goals, 343 and 23 in the top flight alone. On 9 July 2015, he was elected president of Girona, then in the second tier.

== International career ==
Geli represented Spain on four occasions, in a one-year span. His debut came on 15 January 1992, in a friendly with Portugal in Torres Novas.

Additionally, Geli appeared twice for the Catalonia regional team.

== Honours ==
Atlético Madrid

- La Liga: 1995–96
- Copa del Rey: 1995–96

Alavés

- UEFA Cup runner-up: 2000–01
