= Josete (footballer, born 1970) =

Spanish footballer

Personal information
- Full name: José Manuel Tomás Valdovinos
- Date of birth: 12 March 1970 (age 56)
- Place of birth: Huesca, Spain
- Height: 1.72 m (5 ft 8 in)
- Position: Left-back

Team information
- Current team: Balaguer (Manager)

Senior career*
Years	Team	Apps	(Gls)
1989–1990	Telde	24	(0)
1990	Peralta	6	(0)
1990–1994	Rayo Vallecano	111	(6)
1994–1998	Real Betis	75	(1)
1998–2000	Deportivo Alavés	20	(0)
2001–2003	Lleida	31	(0)
Total		267	(7)

Managerial career
- 2004–2005: Fraga
- 2005–2007: Binéfar (youth)
- 2017–2018: Torrefarrera
- 2018–2019: Almudévar
- 2019–2020: Torrefarrera
- 2020–2021: Alcarràs
- 2022–2023: Barbastro
- 2023–: Balaguer
- * Club domestic league appearances and goals

José Manuel Tomás Valdovinos (born 12 March 1970), known as Josete, is a Spanish former professional footballer who played as a left-back, and later worked as a manager. He is currently in charge of CF Balaguer.

== Career ==
Josete was born in Huesca in the autonomous community of Aragon, but the left-footed defender began his career with Telde in the Canary Islands. After brief spells there and with Peralta, he joined Rayo Vallecano in the Segunda División in late 1990. He made 36 appearances for the club during the 1991–92 season, in which they finished as Segunda División runners-up and earned promotion to La Liga. He continued to play a key role for the two top flight campaigns that followed, in the second of which Rayo were relegated following a relegation playoff loss to Compostela.

Josete was able to stay in the top division by joining Real Betis, where he was a regular in the starting lineup for two years, including featuring in their 1995–96 UEFA Cup campaign. In 1996–97 he played only nine matches, and the arrival of Luis Aragonés as head coach ahead of the following season made matters worse. Josete managed only two appearances, and left for Deportivo Alavés that summer. He played just twenty league matches in 2 1/2 seasons with Alavés, before joining Lleida in January 2001. Lleida were relegated from the second tier at the end of that season, and Josete stayed with the club in Segunda División B until retiring in 2003 at the age of 33.

== Retirement ==
After his retirement, Josete continued to live in Lleida, and began a brief coaching career, working with Binéfar in the Tercera División and Almudévar in the Regional Preferente de Aragón. He then left football, becoming an entrepreneur and opening a coffee shop.

== Career statistics ==
As of 29 May 2021

Appearances and goals by club, season and competition
Club	Season	League			Cup		Europe		Other		Total	
Club	Season	Division	Apps	Goals	Apps	Goals	Apps	Goals	Apps	Goals	Apps	Goals
Telde	1989–90	Segunda División B	24	0	–		–		–		24	0
Peralta	1989–90	Tercera División	6	0	–		–		–		6	0
Rayo Vallecano	1990–91	Segunda División	14	0	3	0	–		–		17	0
Rayo Vallecano	1991–92	Segunda División	36	3	4	0	–		–		40	3
Rayo Vallecano	1992–93	La Liga	36	3	4	0	–		–		40	3
Rayo Vallecano	1993–94	La Liga	25	0	2	0	–		2 (Note: Appearances in the 1993–94 La Liga relegation playoff)	0	29	0
Rayo Vallecano	Total		111	6	13	0	0	0	2	0	126	6
Real Betis	1994–95	La Liga	28	0	4	0	–		–		32	0
Real Betis	1995–96	La Liga	36	0	2	0	6 (Note: Appearances in the 1995–96 UEFA Cup)	0	–		44	0
Real Betis	1996–97	La Liga	9	1	4	0	–		–		13	1
Real Betis	1997–98	La Liga	2	0	0	0	1 (Note: Appearance in the 1997–98 UEFA Cup Winners' Cup)	0	–		3	0
Real Betis	Total		75	1	10	0	7	0	0	0	92	1
Deportivo Alavés	1998–99	La Liga	15	0	2	0	–		–		17	0
Deportivo Alavés	1999–2000	La Liga	5	0	0	0	–		–		5	0
Deportivo Alavés	2000–01	La Liga	0	0	1	0	0	0	–		1	0
Deportivo Alavés	Total		20	0	3	0	0	0	0	0	23	0
Lleida	2000–01	Segunda División	1	0	0	0	–		–		1	0
Lleida	2001–02	Segunda División B	25	0	2	0	–		–		27	0
Lleida	2002–03	Segunda División B	5	0	2	0	–		–		7	0
Lleida	Total		31	0	4	0	0	0	0	0	35	0
Career total			267	7	30	0	7	0	2	0	306	7

== Honours ==
Rayo Vallecano

- Segunda División runner-up: 1991–92

Real Betis

- Copa del Rey runner-up: 1996–97
