= 1997–98 Segunda División =

67th season of the second-tier football league in Spain

Segunda División
- Season: 1997–98
- Champions: Deportivo Alavés
- Promoted: Deportivo Alavés; CF Extremadura; Villarreal CF
- Relegated: Elche CF; Real Jaén; Xerez CD; Levante UD
- Matches: 462
- Goals: 999 (2.16 per match)
- Top goalscorer: (Federal Republic of Yugoslavia) Igor Gluščević

The 1997–98 Segunda División season saw 22 teams participate in the second flight Spanish league. Deportivo Alavés won the league. Deportivo Alavés, CF Extremadura and Villarreal CF were promoted to Primera División. Elche CF, Real Jaén, Xerez CD and Levante UD were relegated to Segunda División B.

The league was expanded to 22 teams due to reduction of Primera División to 20 teams.

== Teams ==
Location of teams in Segunda División 1997–98
Canary Islands

Team	Home city	Stadium
Albacete	Albacete	Carlos Belmonte
Alavés	Vitoria-Gasteiz	Mendizorrotza
Atlético Madrid B	Majadahonda	Cerro del Espino
Badajoz	Badajoz	El Vivero
Eibar	Eibar	Ipurua
Elche	Elche	Martínez Valero
Extremadura	Almendralejo	Francisco de la Hera
Hércules	Alicante	José Rico Pérez
Real Jaén	Jaén	La Victoria
Las Palmas	Las Palmas	Insular
Leganés	Leganés	Luis Rodríguez de Miguel
Levante	Valencia	Nou Estadi
Lleida	Lleida	Camp d'Esports
Logroñés	Logroño	Las Gaunas
Numancia	Soria	Los Pajaritos
Osasuna	Pamplona	El Sadar
Ourense	Ourense	O Couto
Rayo Vallecano	Madrid	Vallecas
Sevilla	Seville	Ramón Sánchez Pizjuán
Toledo	Toledo	Salto del Caballo
Villarreal	Villarreal	El Madrigal
Xerez	Jerez de la Frontera	Chapín

1. Leganés played their matches at Municipal de Butarque from February 14'th, 1998.

=== Teams by Autonomous Community ===
	Autonomous community	Number of teams	Teams
1	Valencian Community	4	Elche, Hércules, Levante, Villarreal
2	Andalusia	3	Real Jaén, Sevilla, Xerez
2	Madrid	3	Atlético Madrid B, Leganés, Rayo Vallecano
4	Basque Country	2	Alavés, Eibar
4	Castile-La Mancha	2	Albacete, Toledo
4	Extremadura	2	Badajoz, Extremadura
7	Canary Islands	1	Las Palmas
7	Castile and León	1	Numancia
7	Catalonia	1	Lleida
7	Galicia	1	Ourense
7	La Rioja	1	Logroñés
7	Navarre	1	Osasuna

== Final table ==
Pos	Team	Pld	W	D	L	GF	GA	GD	Pts	Promotion or relegation
1	Deportivo Alavés	42	24	10	8	54	25	+29	82	Promoted to Primera División
2	CF Extremadura	42	23	10	9	60	38	+22	79	Promoted to Primera División
3	UD Las Palmas	42	19	16	7	72	47	+25	73	Promotion playoff
4	Villarreal CF	42	19	16	7	51	38	+13	73	Promotion playoff
5	UE Lleida	42	18	9	15	50	46	+4	63	
6	CD Badajoz	42	16	15	11	48	37	+11	63	
7	Sevilla FC	42	17	11	14	47	44	+3	62	
8	Rayo Vallecano	42	17	9	16	51	48	+3	60	
9	Atlético de Madrid B	42	16	12	14	64	49	+15	60	
10	SD Eibar	42	14	15	13	38	32	+6	57	
11	Hércules CF	42	14	14	14	46	43	+3	56	
12	CD Toledo	42	14	14	14	43	48	−5	56	
13	CD Leganés	42	13	14	15	45	54	−9	53	
14	Albacete	42	13	11	18	41	53	−12	50	
15	CA Osasuna	42	13	11	18	36	42	−6	50	
16	CD Ourense	42	12	13	17	37	46	−9	49	
17	CD Numancia	42	10	17	15	33	50	−17	47	
18	CD Logroñés	42	10	16	16	38	43	−5	46	
19	Elche CF	42	11	12	19	45	56	−11	45	Relegated to Segunda División B
20	Real Jaén	42	9	18	15	39	52	−13	45	Relegated to Segunda División B
21	Xerez CD	42	8	14	20	24	49	−25	38	Relegated to Segunda División B
22	Levante UD	42	8	11	23	37	59	−22	35	Relegated to Segunda División B

== Results ==
Home \ Away	ALB	ALV	ATM	BAD	EIB	ELC	EXT	HER	JAE	LPA	LEG	LEV	LLE	LOG	NUM	OSA	OUR	RAY	SEV	TOL	VIL	XER
Albacete	—	1–1	1–1	1–2	1–1	2–0	0–2	1–0	2–2	0–2	0–2	3–0	0–1	1–2	2–0	2–1	1–0	0–1	1–0	3–1	1–1	1–0
Alavés	5–1	—	2–1	1–0	1–0	0–0	0–1	1–2	1–0	1–1	3–0	1–0	2–1	2–0	3–0	1–0	0–1	3–0	1–0	3–0	5–1	1–0
Atlético B	2–0	0–1	—	1–2	2–0	3–0	3–1	3–1	1–1	1–1	1–1	3–1	3–1	1–1	4–2	5–0	1–0	1–1	0–1	2–1	1–1	2–0
Badajoz	0–0	0–0	1–1	—	1–0	5–0	2–0	2–0	1–1	1–0	1–1	2–0	1–0	0–0	2–2	2–1	2–0	1–3	2–0	0–1	0–0	0–0
Eibar	2–0	2–1	1–0	3–1	—	1–0	0–0	0–1	0–0	0–0	0–0	1–1	1–0	2–1	1–0	0–1	3–0	0–1	1–1	3–3	0–0	3–0
Elche	3–0	0–1	3–1	0–1	0–4	—	0–1	1–1	1–0	0–1	1–1	1–0	0–0	5–0	3–0	2–0	2–2	2–1	0–2	1–1	2–2	1–0
Extremadura	2–0	2–1	2–1	0–0	1–0	3–2	—	1–1	2–2	1–1	0–0	1–0	3–0	2–0	0–0	1–1	3–1	3–1	3–0	0–1	0–0	1–0
Hércules	3–1	1–1	2–1	3–1	0–0	2–1	0–1	—	1–0	4–0	1–3	1–1	4–3	1–2	0–1	0–0	2–1	0–0	1–0	4–1	2–1	0–0
Real Jaén	1–0	0–0	1–1	2–1	0–1	2–1	2–4	0–0	—	1–4	1–2	0–0	1–2	1–1	1–0	1–1	1–1	0–1	1–0	3–1	1–2	1–1
Las Palmas	3–2	4–0	3–3	2–0	4–1	4–3	2–1	3–2	3–0	—	1–1	1–2	0–0	0–4	5–1	3–0	2–0	2–0	1–1	1–2	0–0	2–0
Leganés	0–2	1–2	2–1	1–1	1–0	1–0	3–2	2–1	2–1	0–0	—	4–4	0–0	1–1	0–1	0–0	1–2	0–1	1–0	3–1	0–2	1–1
Levante	1–3	0–1	2–1	1–1	1–2	3–3	0–1	0–0	2–0	0–2	0–1	—	1–1	1–2	1–1	0–2	1–0	1–0	0–0	0–1	1–2	0–1
Lleida	2–0	1–2	0–2	2–0	1–1	2–0	2–0	2–1	1–1	5–2	0–2	0–3	—	0–0	3–0	2–1	2–1	3–1	3–0	2–1	0–2	2–0
Logroñés	1–2	1–1	1–0	2–1	1–1	0–1	1–1	0–1	1–2	0–1	2–0	0–0	0–1	—	2–0	0–0	0–1	3–1	2–2	1–2	3–1	0–0
Numancia	1–1	0–2	0–0	0–0	0–0	2–1	0–3	0–0	2–2	0–0	1–1	3–1	1–0	1–0	—	0–0	4–0	0–1	1–1	1–0	1–2	1–1
Osasuna	0–0	0–1	3–0	1–2	1–1	0–0	2–1	2–1	2–0	3–1	2–1	0–1	0–1	1–0	0–1	—	1–1	1–3	3–0	1–1	0–1	2–0
Ourense	2–2	0–0	3–4	0–3	1–0	2–1	0–1	2–0	1–1	1–1	4–0	2–0	0–0	0–0	1–1	2–0	—	2–0	0–1	0–0	0–0	1–2
Rayo	0–0	0–0	1–0	4–3	0–1	1–2	5–2	0–0	0–1	3–3	1–0	3–0	2–0	2–1	2–0	0–1	0–0	—	1–3	2–1	5–0	0–0
Sevilla	2–0	1–0	1–3	1–1	1–1	0–0	3–1	1–0	4–0	1–1	3–2	0–4	5–1	1–1	1–0	2–0	1–0	3–2	—	2–0	0–0	2–0
Toledo	2–2	0–0	0–1	1–2	2–0	2–0	0–1	1–1	0–0	2–2	3–2	1–0	1–0	0–0	1–1	1–0	0–1	1–1	1–0	—	2–1	0–0
Villarreal	1–0	2–1	1–1	1–0	1–0	1–1	0–2	2–1	1–1	0–0	3–1	3–2	0–0	2–1	0–1	1–0	2–0	3–0	3–0	1–1	—	3–0
Xerez	0–1	0–1	2–1	0–0	1–0	1–1	1–3	0–0	0–3	0–3	3–0	4–1	1–3	0–0	2–2	0–2	0–1	1–0	1–0	0–2	1–1	—

Source: SoccerWay
Legend: Blue = home team win; Yellow = draw; Red = away team win.

== Promotion playoff ==
Team 1	Agg.	Team 2	1st leg	2nd leg
Villarreal CF	(a) 1–1	SD Compostela	0–0	1–1
Real Oviedo	4–3	UD Las Palmas	3–0	1–3

=== First leg ===
21 May 1998	Villarreal CF	0–0	SD Compostela	Villarreal
21:45		Report (in Spanish)		Stadium: El Madrigal; Attendance: 9,000; Referee: Víctor Esquinas Torres (Community of Madrid)

22 May 1998	Real Oviedo	3–0	UD Las Palmas	Oviedo
21:45	Iván Ania 9' (pen.), 27'; Dely Valdés 59'	Report (in Spanish)		Stadium: Carlos Tartiere; Attendance: 23,500; Referee: Eduardo Iturralde González (Basque Country (autonomous community))

=== Second leg ===
24 May 1998	SD Compostela	1–1 (1–1 agg.)	Villarreal CF	Santiago de Compostela
21:45	Chiba 57'	Report (in Spanish)	Alberto 7'	Stadium: Multiusos de San Lázaro; Attendance: 11,500; Referee: Manuel Díaz Vega (Asturias)

25 May 1998	UD Las Palmas	3–1 (3–4 agg.)	Real Oviedo	Las Palmas de Gran Canaria
22:00	Gamboa 20'; Walter Pico 65'; Paquito 66'	Report (in Spanish)	Gamboa 29' (o.g.)	Stadium: Insular; Attendance: 21,000; Referee: Antonio Jesús López Nieto (Andalusia)
