= 2002–03 Deportivo Alavés season =

Deportivo Alavés
2002–03 season
- President: Gonzalo Antón
- Head coach: Mané (until 29 April); Txutxi Aranguren (from 29 April)
- Stadium: Mendizorrotza
- La Liga: 19th (relegated)
- Copa del Rey: Round of 16
- UEFA Cup: Second round
- Top goalscorer: League: Rubén Navarro (10); All: Rubén Navarro (15)

The 2002–03 season was the 81st season in the existence of Deportivo Alavés, and the club's fifth season in the top flight of Spanish football since winning promotion from the 1997–98 Segunda División. In addition to the domestic league, Alavés participated in this season's editions of the Copa del Rey and UEFA Cup. The season covered the period from 1 July 2002 to 30 June 2003.

== First-team squad ==
Retrieved on 14 May 2021

Note: Flags indicate national team as defined under FIFA eligibility rules; some limited exceptions apply. Players may hold more than one non-FIFA nationality.

No.	Pos.	Nation	Player
1	GK	FRA	Richard Dutruel
2	MF	SCG	Ivan Tomić (on loan from Roma)
3	DF	ESP	Ibon Begoña
5	DF	ESP	Antonio Karmona (captain)
6	DF	ESP	Óscar Téllez
7	DF	ESP	Delfí Geli
8	FW	ROU	Bogdan Mara
9	FW	ESP	Rubén Navarro
10	MF	ESP	Pablo Gómez
11	FW	BRA	Magno
14	MF	NED	Jordi Cruyff
15	FW	ROU	Adrian Ilie

No.	Pos.	Nation	Player
16	MF	ARG	Hermes Desio
17	MF	ESP	Edu Alonso
18	MF	ARG	Martín Astudillo
19	FW	URU	Iván Alonso
20	DF	ESP	Carlos Llorens
21	MF	ESP	Jesús Turiel
23	DF	ESP	Abelardo Fernández
24	MF	ESP	Luis Helguera (on loan from Udinese)
26	DF	ESP	Juan Cruz Ochoa
27	MF	ESP	Nacho Fernández
30	GK	ESP	Juan Pablo

=== Left club during season ===
Retrieved on 14 May 2021

Note: Flags indicate national team as defined under FIFA eligibility rules; some limited exceptions apply. Players may hold more than one non-FIFA nationality.

No.	Pos.	Nation	Player
4	DF	NOR	Dan Eggen (to Rangers)
—	DF	ARG	Pablo Brandán (on loan to Independiente)

No.	Pos.	Nation	Player
—	MF	ESP	Mario Rosas (to Numancia)

=== Out on loan for the full season ===
Retrieved on 10 May 2021

Note: Flags indicate national team as defined under FIFA eligibility rules; some limited exceptions apply. Players may hold more than one non-FIFA nationality.

No.	Pos.	Nation	Player
28	DF	ESP	Josu Sarriegi (on loan at Eibar)

== Transfers ==
=== In ===
#	Pos	Player	From	Notes
Summer
1	GK	(France) Richard Dutruel	(Spain) Barcelona	
15	FW	(Romania) Adrian Ilie	(Spain) Valencia	
17	MF	(Spain) Edu Alonso	(Spain) Las Palmas	Free
23	DF	(Spain) Abelardo Fernández	(Spain) Barcelona	
24	MF	(Spain) Luis Helguera	(Italy) Udinese	Loan
	MF	(Spain) Mario Rosas	(Spain) Salamanca	Loan return
Winter
2	MF	(Serbia and Montenegro) Ivan Tomić	(Italy) Roma	Loan

=== Out ===
#	Pos	Player	To	Notes
Summer
1	GK	(Argentina) Martín Herrera	(England) Fulham	Free
2	DF	(Argentina) Fabricio Coloccini	(Italy) Milan	Loan return
22	MF	(Netherlands) Richard Witschge	(Netherlands) Ajax	Loan return
23	FW	(Croatia) Jurica Vučko	(Spain) Salamanca	
25	GK	(Spain) Kike Burgos	(Spain) Polideportivo Ejido	
27	MF	(Spain) Sergio de la Cruz	(Spain) Eibar	
28	DF	(Spain) Josu Sarriegi	(Spain) Eibar	Loan
Winter
4	DF	(Norway) Dan Eggen	(Scotland) Rangers	Free
	DF	(Argentina) Pablo Brandán	(Argentina) Independiente	Loan
	MF	(Spain) Mario Rosas	(Spain) Numancia	

== Competitions ==
=== Overview ===
Competition	First match	Last match	Starting round	Final position	Record							
Competition	First match	Last match	Starting round	Final position	Pld	W	D	L	GF	GA	GD	Win %
La Liga	1 September 2002	21 June 2003	Matchday 1	19th (relegated)	38	8	11	19	38	68	−30	21.05
Copa del Rey	11 September 2002	15 January 2003	Round of 64	Round of 16	4	2	1	1	6	4	+2	50.00
UEFA Cup	19 September 2002	14 November 2002	First round	Second round	4	2	1	1	6	3	+3	50.00
Total					46	12	13	21	50	75	−25	26.09

=== La Liga ===
==== League table ====
Pos	Team	Pld	W	D	L	GF	GA	GD	Pts	Qualification or relegation
16	Racing Santander	38	13	5	20	54	64	−10	44	Qualification for the Intertoto Cup second round
17	Espanyol	38	10	13	15	48	54	−6	43	
18	Recreativo (R)	38	8	12	18	35	61	−26	36	Relegation to the Segunda División
19	Alavés (R)	38	8	11	19	38	68	−30	35	Relegation to the Segunda División
20	Rayo Vallecano (R)	38	7	11	20	31	62	−31	32	Relegation to the Segunda División

Source: LFP
Rules for classification: 1st points; 2nd head-to-head points; 3rd head-to-head goal difference; 4th head-to-head away goals scored; 5th goal difference; 6th number of goals scored; 7th Fair-play points
(R) Relegated

==== Results summary ====
Overall								Home						Away					
Pld	W	D	L	GF	GA	GD	Pts	W	D	L	GF	GA	GD	W	D	L	GF	GA	GD
38	8	11	19	38	68	−30	35	5	8	6	18	20	−2	3	3	13	20	48	−28

==== Results by round ====
Round	1	2	3	4	5	6	7	8	9	10	11	12	13	14	15	16	17	18	19	20	21	22	23	24	25	26	27	28	29	30	31	32	33	34	35	36	37	38
Ground	A	H	A	H	A	H	A	H	A	H	A	H	A	H	A	H	A	H	A	H	A	H	A	H	A	H	A	H	A	H	A	H	A	H	A	H	A	H
Result	D	L	W	L	L	D	L	W	L	W	D	D	L	W	L	W	D	D	W	D	L	W	L	L	L	D	L	D	L	L	L	D	W	L	L	L	L	D
Position	11	15	12	11	15	16	18	14	16	14	13	15	16	14	16	15	16	14	11	14	14	9	14	17	17	18	18	18	18	18	19	19	19	18	18	18	19	19

A = Away; H = Home; W = Win; D = Draw; L = Loss; = Relegation to the Segunda División

==== Matches ====
1 September 2002 1	Rayo Vallecano	2 – 2	Deportivo Alavés	Madrid, Spain
18:00	Álvarez 21', 64' (pen.)	Report	37' I. Alonso; 71' Magno	Stadium: Estadio Teresa Rivero; Referee: Evaristo Puentes Leira

15 September 2002 2	Deportivo Alavés	0 – 1	Racing Santander	Vitoria-Gasteiz, Spain
17:00		Report	29' Bodipo	Stadium: Mendizorrotza; Referee: Antonio Rubinos Pérez

22 September 2002 3	Villarreal	0 – 1	Deportivo Alavés	Villarreal, Spain
18:00		Report	34' I. Alonso	Stadium: Estadio El Madrigal; Referee: Arturo Daudén Ibáñez

28 September 2002 4	Deportivo Alavés	1 – 2	Deportivo La Coruña	Vitoria-Gasteiz, Spain
19:30	I. Alonso 52'	Report	69' Tristán; 89' Capdevila	Stadium: Mendizorrotza; Referee: Alfonso Pino Zamorano

6 October 2002 5	Real Madrid	5 – 2	Deportivo La Coruña	Madrid, Spain
17:00	Zidane 1'; Figo 30' (pen.), 71'; Ronaldo 64', 78'	Report	36' Magno; 84' I. Alonso	Stadium: Santiago Bernabéu Stadium; Referee: Alberto Undiano

20 October 2002 6	Deportivo Alavés	2 – 2	Real Sociedad	Vitoria-Gasteiz, Spain
17:00	Astudillo 4'; Navarro 86'	Report	33' Kahveci; 67' Karpin	Stadium: Mendizorrotza; Referee: Carlos Megía Dávila

26 October 2002 7	Barcelona	6 – 1	Deportivo Alavés	Barcelona, Spain
20:00	Kluivert 16', 27', 80'; Mendieta 35' (pen.); Enrique 40'; Xavi 65'	Report	54' Begoña	Stadium: Camp Nou; Referee: Bernardino González Vázquez

3 November 2002 8	Deportivo Alavés	1 – 0	Sevilla	Vitoria-Gasteiz, Spain
18:00	Navarro 90'	Report		Stadium: Mendizorrotza; Referee: Fernando Carmona Méndez

10 November 2002 9	Mallorca	3 – 1	Deportivo Alavés	Palma de Mallorca, Spain
16:00	Pandiani 29', 77' (pen.); Ibagaza 66'	Report	90' Ilie	Stadium: Estadi de Son Moix; Referee: Rafael Ramírez Domínguez

17 November 2002 10	Deportivo Alavés	3 – 0	Recreativo de Huelva	Vitoria-Gasteiz, Spain
16:00	Navarro 10'; Magno 19'; Ilie 54'	Report		Stadium: Mendizorrotza; Referee: Jesús Téllez Sánchez

24 November 2002 11	Málaga	0 – 0	Deportivo Alavés	Málaga, Spain
16:00		Report		Stadium: La Rosaleda; Referee: Manuel Mejuto González

1 December 2002 12	Deportivo Alavés	0 – 0	Valencia	Vitoria-Gasteiz, Spain
16:00		Report		Stadium: Mendizorrotza; Referee: Javier Turienzo Álvarez

8 December 2002 13	Celta Vigo	2 – 1	Deportivo Alavés	Vigo, Spain
16:00	Karmona 22' (o.g.); Luccin 25' (pen.)	Report	50' (pen.) Ilie	Stadium: Balaídos; Referee: Alexis Pérez Pérez

14 December 2002 14	Deportivo Alavés	2 – 0	Atlético Madrid	Vitoria-Gasteiz, Spain
19:00	Navarro 11'; Ilie 30'	Report		Stadium: Mendizorrotza; Referee: Alberto Undiano

21 December 2002 15	Athletic Bilbao	2 – 0	Deportivo Alavés	Bilbao, Spain
19:00	Urzaiz 16'; Etxeberria 74'	Report		Stadium: San Mamés; Referee: Julián Rodríguez Santiago

5 January 2003 16	Deportivo Alavés	2 – 1	Espanyol	Vitoria-Gasteiz, Spain
16:00	Cruyff 32'; Soldevilla 76' (o.g.)	Report	19' Milošević	Stadium: Mendizorrotza; Referee: Víctor Esquinas Torres

12 January 2003 17	Real Betis	2 – 2	Deportivo Alavés	Seville, Spain
16:00	Fernando 44'; Joaquín 88'	Report	57' Magno; 90' Turiel	Stadium: Estadio Manuel Ruiz de Lopera; Referee: Alfonso Pérez

19 January 2003 18	Deportivo Alavés	1 – 1	Osasuna	Vitoria-Gasteiz, Spain
16:00	Ilie 40'	Report	88' Aloisi	Stadium: Mendizorrotza; Referee: Bernardino González Vázquez

26 January 2003 19	Real Valladolid	1 – 3	Deportivo Alavés	Valladolid, Spain
16:00	Ćirić 86'	Report	19', 79' Navarro; 90' I. Alonso	Stadium: José Zorrilla; Referee: Luis Medina Cantalejo

2 February 2003 20	Deportivo Alavés	1 – 1	Rayo Vallecano	Vitoria-Gasteiz, Spain
16:00	Karmona 70'	Report	19' Peragón	Stadium: Mendizorrotza; Referee: Antonio López Nieto

9 February 2003 21	Racing Santander	2 – 0	Deportivo Alavés	Santander, Spain
16:00	Nafti 26'; Regueiro 87'	Report		Stadium: El Sardinero; Referee: Javier Moreno Delgado

16 February 2003 22	Deportivo Alavés	1 – 0	Villarreal	Vitoria-Gasteiz, Spain
16:00	Tomić 75'	Report		Stadium: Mendizorrotza; Referee: César Muñiz Fernández

22 February 2003 23	Deportivo La Coruña	6 – 0	Deportivo Alavés	A Coruña, Spain
19:45	Tristán 15', 19', 59'; Makaay 34', 52'; Luque 62'	Report		Stadium: Estadio Riazor; Referee: Fernando Carmona Méndez

1 March 2003 24	Deportivo Alavés	1 – 5	Real Madrid	Vitoria-Gasteiz, Spain
20:30	I. Alonso 75'	Report	11', 64', 77' Ronaldo; 35', 83' Raúl	Stadium: Mendizorrotza; Referee: Javier Turienzo Álvarez

9 March 2003 25	Real Sociedad	3 – 1	Deportivo Alavés	San Sebastián, Spain
19:30	Kovačević 16'; Kahveci 39'; Karpin 43'	Report	83' (pen.) Navarro	Stadium: Anoeta; Referee: Rafael Ramírez Domínguez

16 March 2003 26	Deportivo Alavés	0 – 0	Barcelona	Vitoria-Gasteiz, Spain
18:00		Report		Stadium: Mendizorrotza; Referee: Víctor Esquinas Torres

23 March 2003 27	Sevilla	3 – 2	Deportivo Alavés	Seville, Spain
16:00	Casquero 21'; Reyes 84' (pen.); Karmona 89' (o.g.)	Report	60' Navarro; 78' Astudillo	Stadium: Ramón Sánchez Pizjuán; Referee: Antonio Rubinos Pérez

6 April 2003 28	Deportivo Alavés	0 – 0	Mallorca	Vitoria-Gasteiz, Spain
16:00		Report		Stadium: Mendizorrotza; Referee: Arturo Daudén Ibáñez

13 April 2003 29	Recreativo de Huelva	1 – 0	Deportivo Alavés	Huelva, Spain
11:00	García 3'	Report		Stadium: Nuevo Colombino; Referee: Manuel Mejuto González

20 April 2003 30	Deportivo Alavés	0 – 1	Málaga	Vitoria-Gasteiz, Spain
16:00		Report	90' Silva	Stadium: Mendizorrotza; Referee: Fernando Carmona Méndez

27 April 2003 31	Valencia	3 – 0	Deportivo Alavés	Valencia, Spain
16:00	Réveillère 31'; Rufete 56'; Aimar 67'	Report		Stadium: Mestalla Stadium; Referee: Bernardino González Vázquez

4 May 2003 32	Deportivo Alavés	0 – 0	Celta Vigo	Vitoria-Gasteiz, Spain
16:30		Report		Stadium: Mendizorrotza; Referee: Alberto Undiano

10 May 2003 33	Atlético Madrid	0 – 1	Deportivo Alavés	Madrid, Spain
16:00		Report	55' Ilie	Stadium: Vicente Calderón Stadium; Referee: César Muñiz Fernández

18 May 2003 34	Deportivo Alavés	2 – 4	Athletic Bilbao	Vitoria-Gasteiz, Spain
17:00	Magno 26'; Astudillo 28'	Report	19' Yeste; 57' Urzaiz; 75', 84' Etxeberria	Stadium: Mendizorrotza; Referee: Jesús Téllez Sánchez

25 May 2003 35	Espanyol	3 – 1	Deportivo Alavés	Barcelona, Spain
17:00	Milošević 41', 46' (pen.); Rodríguez 90'	Report	58' (pen.) Llorens	Stadium: Estadi Olímpic Lluís Companys; Referee: Carlos Megía Dávila

1 June 2003 36	Deportivo Alavés	0 – 1	Real Betis	Vitoria-Gasteiz, Spain
18:00		Report	57' Fernando	Stadium: Mendizorrotza; Referee: Julián Rodríguez Santiago

15 June 2003 37	Osasuna	4 – 2	Deportivo Alavés	Pamplona, Spain
18:00	Aloisi 24' (pen.), 78'; Moha 68', 86'	Report	35', 83' Navarro	Stadium: El Sadar; Referee: Antonio López Nieto

21 June 2003 38	Deportivo Alavés	1 – 1	Real Valladolid	Vitoria-Gasteiz, Spain
19:00	Pablo Gómez 58'	Report	36' Aganzo	Stadium: Mendizorrotza; Referee: Javier Moreno Delgado

=== Copa del Rey ===
Win Draw Loss

Round	Date	Time	Opponent	Venue	Result
Round of 64	11 September 2002	19:30	Barakaldo	A	3–1 (a.e.t.)
Round of 32	6 November 2002	20:00	Real Zaragoza	A	2–1

Round	Opponent	Aggregate	First leg				Second leg			
Round	Opponent	Aggregate	Date	Time	Venue	Result	Date	Time	Venue	Result
Round of 16	Real Murcia	1–2	8 January 2003	20:00	A	0–0	15 January 2003	19:30	H	1–2

=== UEFA Cup ===
==== First round ====
19 September 2002 First leg	MKE Ankaragücü (Turkey)	1 – 2	(Spain) Deportivo Alavés	Ankara, Turkey
19:45	Niculescu 30'	Report	43' Astudillo; 81' Navarro	Stadium: Ankara 19 Mayıs Stadium; Attendance: 15,000; Referee: Roberto Rosetti (Italy)

3 October 2002 Second leg	Deportivo Alavés (Spain)	3 – 0	(Turkey) MKE Ankaragücü	Vitoria-Gasteiz, Spain
19:30	Dursun 6' (o.g.); Turiel 49', 75'	Report		Stadium: Mendizorrotza; Attendance: 9,000; Referee: Sorin Corpodean (Romania)

Deportivo Alavés won 5–1 on aggregate

==== Second round ====
31 October 2002 First leg	Deportivo Alavés (Spain)	1 – 1	(Turkey) Beşiktaş	Vitoria-Gasteiz, Spain
20:45 CET	Abelardo Fernández 90+3'	Report	31' (o.g.) Karmona	Stadium: Mendizorrotza; Attendance: 10,375; Referee: Michal Beneš (Czech Republic)

14 November 2002 Second leg	Beşiktaş (Turkey)	1 – 0	(Spain) Deportivo Alavés	Istanbul, Turkey
20:30 TRT	Mansiz 7'	Report		Stadium: BJK İnönü Stadium; Attendance: 24,000; Referee: Pascal Garubian (France)

Beşiktaş won 2–1 on aggregate

== Statistics ==
=== Appearances and goals ===
Last updated on 15 May 2021.

No.	Pos	Nat	Player	Total		La Liga		Copa del Rey		UEFA Cup	
No.	Pos	Nat	Player	Apps	Goals	Apps	Goals	Apps	Goals	Apps	Goals
1	GK	(France) FRA	Richard Dutruel	41	0	33	0	4	0	4	0
2	MF	(Serbia and Montenegro) SCG	Ivan Tomić	10	1	9+1	1	0	0	0	0
3	DF	(Spain) ESP	Ibon Begoña	34	1	22+5	1	3+1	0	3	0
5	DF	(Spain) ESP	Antonio Karmona	38	1	32+1	1	2	0	3	0
6	DF	(Spain) ESP	Óscar Téllez	31	0	24+1	0	3	0	3	0
7	DF	(Spain) ESP	Delfí Geli	39	0	24+8	0	3+1	0	2+1	0
8	FW	(Romania) ROU	Bogdan Mara	18	0	4+10	0	3	0	0+1	0
9	FW	(Spain) ESP	Rubén Navarro	44	15	23+13	10	2+2	4	0+4	1
10	MF	(Spain) ESP	Pablo Gómez	24	1	20+2	1	1	0	1	0
11	FW	(Brazil) BRA	Magno	33	5	18+11	5	2+1	0	1	0
14	MF	(Netherlands) NED	Jordi Cruyff	32	1	19+7	1	3	0	2+1	0
15	FW	(Romania) ROU	Adrian Ilie	25	6	11+11	6	1	0	1+1	0
16	MF	(Argentina) ARG	Hermes Desio	20	0	13+3	0	1+1	0	2	0
17	MF	(Spain) ESP	Edu Alonso	24	0	15+3	0	2+1	0	2+1	0
18	MF	(Argentina) ARG	Martín Astudillo	30	5	25	3	1	1	4	1
19	FW	(Uruguay) URU	Iván Alonso	45	7	22+15	6	2+2	1	4	0
20	DF	(Spain) ESP	Carlos Llorens	43	1	35	1	4	0	4	0
21	MF	(Spain) ESP	Jesús Turiel	29	3	14+9	1	1+2	0	2+1	2
23	DF	(Spain) ESP	Abelardo Fernández	32	1	28	0	1	0	3	1
24	MF	(Spain) ESP	Luis Helguera	26	0	18+4	0	3	0	0+1	0
26	DF	(Spain) ESP	Juan Cruz Ochoa	5	0	3+1	0	0	0	1	0
27	MF	(Spain) ESP	Nacho Fernández	2	0	1+1	0	0	0	0	0
30	GK	(Spain) ESP	Juan Pablo	5	0	5	0	0	0	0	0
Players who have left the club after the start of the season:
4	DF	(Norway) NOR	Dan Eggen	4	0	0	0	2	0	2	0
	DF	(Argentina) ARG	Pablo Brandán	0	0	0	0	0	0	0	0
	MF	(Spain) ESP	Mario Rosas	0	0	0	0	0	0	0	0

=== Goal scorers ===
Place	Position	Nation	Number	Name	La Liga	Copa del Rey	UEFA Cup	Total
1	FW	(Spain)	9	Rubén Navarro	10	4	1	15
2	FW	(Uruguay)	19	Iván Alonso	6	1	0	7
3	FW	(Romania)	15	Adrian Ilie	6	0	0	6
4	FW	(Brazil)	11	Magno	5	0	0	5
4	MF	(Argentina)	18	Martín Astudillo	3	1	1	5
6	MF	(Spain)	21	Jesús Turiel	1	0	2	3
7	MF	(Serbia and Montenegro)	2	Ivan Tomić	1	0	0	1
7	DF	(Spain)	3	Ibon Begoña	1	0	0	1
7	DF	(Spain)	5	Antonio Karmona	1	0	0	1
7	MF	(Spain)	10	Pablo Gómez	1	0	0	1
7	MF	(Netherlands)	14	Jordi Cruyff	1	0	0	1
7	DF	(Spain)	20	Carlos Llorens	1	0	0	1
7	DF	(Spain)	23	Abelardo Fernández	0	0	1	1
				Own goals	1	0	1	2
				TOTALS	38	6	6	50
