= 1996–97 UE Lleida season =

UE Lleida
1996–97 season
- President: Josep Lluís González
- Manager: Txetxu Rojo
- Grounds: Camp d'Esports
- Segunda División: 11th
- Copa del Rey: Round of 16
- Copa Catalunya: Group Stage
- Top goalscorer: League: All: Estefan Juliá (8)

1996–97 UE Lleida season described the events of the 1996–97 season for the Spanish association football club UE Lleida.

== First-team squad ==
Note: Flags indicate national team as defined under FIFA eligibility rules; some limited exceptions apply. Players may hold more than one non-FIFA nationality.

No.	Pos.	Nation	Player
1	GK	ESP	Emili Isierte
2	MF	ESP	Íñigo Lizarralde
3	DF	ESP	Carlos Llorens
4	DF	ESP	Andrés de la Rosa
5	DF	ESP	David Belenguer (from December)
6	MF	ESP	Gaizka Garitano
7	FW	ESP	Gerard Escoda
8	MF	ESP	Antonio Roa
9	FW	YUG	Rahim Beširović
10	MF	ESP	Antonio Calderón
11	FW	ESP	Estefan Juliá
12	MF	ESP	Àlex Fernández (from January)
13	GK	ESP	Raúl Ojeda (from January)
14	FW	ESP	Gorka Bidaurrázaga

No.	Pos.	Nation	Player
15	MF	BIH	Zoran Čampara
16	DF	BRA	Sandro Marques
17	MF	ESP	Gerardo García
18	MF	ESP	Óscar Arias
19	FW	ESP	Lluís González
20	MF	ESP	Ángel Luis Fernández
21	MF	ESP	Vicente Fernández
22	FW	URU	Julio Rodríguez
23	FW	CMR	Joseph Mbarga (from December)
24	DF	ESP	Txutxi Díez
—	GK	ARG	José María Buljubasich (to January)
—	DF	ARG	Diego Cocca (to December)
—	DF	ESP	Víctor Segura

=== In ===
#	Pos	Player	From	Date
	MF	(Spain) Óscar Arias	(Spain) Alavés	05–06–1996
	MF	(Spain) Gaizka Garitano	(Spain) Bilbao Athletic	12–06–1996
	MF	(Spain) Antonio Calderón	(Spain) Rayo Vallecano	20–06–1996
	FW	(Federal Republic of Yugoslavia) Rahim Beširović	(Federal Republic of Yugoslavia) Partizan	23–06–1996
	MF	(Spain) Ángel Luis Fernández	(Spain) Mérida	25–06–1996
	FW	(Spain) Lluís González	(Spain) Mérida	28–06–1996
	FW	(Spain) Gerard Escoda	(Spain) Nàstic	30–06–1996
	FW	(Spain) Estefan Juliá	(Spain) Sant Andreu	01–07–1996
	DF	(Spain) Andrés de la Rosa	(Spain) Oviedo	03–07–1996
	MF	(Spain) Gerardo García	(Spain) Leganés	10–07–1996
	DF	(Brazil) Sandro Marques	(Paraguay) Guaraní	18–07–1996
	DF	(Spain) Txutxi Díez	(Spain) Athletic	12–08–1996
	FW	(Spain) Gorka Bidaurrázaga	(Spain) Athletic	20–08–1996
	DF	(Argentina) Diego Cocca	(Argentina) Ferro Carril Oeste	21–08–1996
	GK	(Argentina) José María Buljubasich	(Spain) Tenerife	27–08–1996
	DF	(Spain) David Belenguer	(Spain) Celta	27–12–1996
	FW	(Cameroon) Joseph Mbarga	(Cameroon) Canon Yaoundé	27–12–1996
	MF	(Spain) Àlex Fernández	(Spain) Espanyol	07–01–1997
	GK	(Spain) Raúl Ojeda	(Spain) Gavà	15–01–1997

== Competitions ==
=== Pre-season ===
Friendlies
Kick Off	Opponents	H / A	Result	Scorers
1996-07-27	(Spain) Rialp	A	21 – 0	Beširović (5), González (5), Escoda (4), Juliá (2), Fernández, Roa, Rodríguez, Arias, Calderón
1996-07-31	(Spain) Torrefarrera	A	8 – 1	Beširović 32', 42', González 33', Calderón 67', 78', Juliá 73', 85', Escoda 86'
1996-08-02	(Spain) Arbeca	A	13 – 0	Juliá 18', Beširović 22', 30', Calderón 32', 37', Escoda 48', 73', 80', González 55', 70', Rodríguez 60', Garitano 78', Roa 83'
1996-08-03	(Spain) Balaguer	N	2 – 0	Rodríguez 31', Marques 43'
1996-08-03	(Spain) Espanyol B	N	1 – 0	González 15'
1996-08-07	(Spain) Caspe	A	7 – 0	Beširović 1', Čampara 18', García 24', González 38', 86', Gil (o.g.) 45', Llorens 90'
1996-08-08	(Spain) Fraga	A	4 – 1	Fernández 31', Escoda 34', 66', Rodríguez 78'
1996-08-10	(Spain) Balaguer	A	2 – 0	Yriarte 15', Rodríguez 62'
1996-08-14	(Spain) Binéfar	A	2 – 1	Escoda (2)
1996-08-17	(Spain) Tàrrega	N	1 – 1	Garitano 62' (pen.)
1996-08-19	(Spain) Nàstic	A	2 – 2	Juliá 56', Candelas 69'
1996-08-22	(Spain) Zaragoza	H	3 – 1	González 12', 67', Escoda 16'
1996-08-29	(Spain) Alcampell	A	5 – 0	Beširović 18', Bidaurrázaga 26', Juliá 64', 78', Marques 72'

Copa Catalunya
Kick Off	Opponents	H / A	Result	Scorers
1996-08-24	(Spain) Sabadell	N	0 – 0	
1996-08-24	(Spain) Ribera d'Ondara	A	2 – 0	

=== Segunda División ===
Kick Off	Opponents	H / A	Result	Scorers	Referee	Pos	Report
1996-08-31 17:30	Osasuna	H	0 – 0		Valle Gil	12th	MR
1996-09-07 17:30	Barcelona B	A	0 – 0		Rubio Iniesta	12th	MR
1996-09-15 12:00	Salamanca	H	3 – 1	Čampara 26', Arias 64', Escoda 83'	Pérez Izquierdo	8th	MR
1996-09-21 17:30	Villarreal	A	1 – 2	Arias 75'	Sanjorge Otero	11th	MR
