= 1995–96 UE Lleida season =

UE Lleida
1995–96 season
- Chairman: Màrius Duran
- Manager: Antonio López (until January); Txetxu Rojo (from January)
- Segunda División: 11th
- Top goalscorer: League: Francisco Javier Salillas (10); All: Francisco Javier Salillas (10)

The 1995–96 season was the 57th season in UE Lleida's existence, and their 2nd year in Segunda División after relegation, and covered the period from 1 July 1995, to 30 June 1996.

== First-team squad ==
Note: Flags indicate national team as defined under FIFA eligibility rules; some limited exceptions apply. Players may hold more than one non-FIFA nationality.

No.	Pos.	Nation	Player
1	GK	ESP	Emili Isierte
2	MF	ESP	Miguel Ángel Rubio
3	DF	ESP	Ricardo Carrero
4	DF	ESP	Carlos Llorens
5	MF	BIH	Zoran Čampara
6	DF	MKD	Boban Babunski
7	FW	BRA	Gerson Lente
8	MF	ESP	Antoni Palau
9	FW	ESP	Francisco Javier Salillas
10	MF	ESP	Íñigo Lizarralde
11	FW	ESP	José María Cela
12	DF	ESP	Matías Rubio

No.	Pos.	Nation	Player
13	GK	ESP	Raúl Ojeda
14	MF	ESP	Fredi Lobeira
15	MF	ESP	Javi Sanchís
16	DF	ESP	Lluís Elcacho
17	MF	ESP	José Antonio Manzano
18	MF	ESP	Antonio Roa
19	FW	ESP	Jorge Sola
20	DF	ESP	Víctor Segura
21	MF	ESP	Vicente Fernández
22	FW	URU	Julio Rodríguez (from December)
23	FW	ESP	Héctor Besora

=== Transfers ===
==== In ====
#	Pos	Player	From	Date
	FW	(Spain) Héctor Besora	(Spain) Nàstic	1 July 1995
	DF	(Spain) Víctor Segura	(Spain) Logroñés	7 July 1995
	MF	(Spain) Javi Sanchís	(Spain) Valencia B	7 July 1995
	DF	(Spain) Carlos Llorens	(Spain) Levante	10 July 1995
	MF	(Spain) Íñigo Lizarralde	(Spain) Zaragoza	11 July 1995
	MF	(Bosnia and Herzegovina) Zoran Čampara	(Federal Republic of Yugoslavia) Rad Beograd	14 July 1995
	MF	(Spain) José Antonio Manzano	(Spain) Elche	21 July 1995
	FW	(Spain) José María Cela	(Spain) Barcelona B	2 August 1995
	FW	(Brazil) Gerson Lente	(Peru) Alianza Lima	7 August 1995
	DF	(Spain) Ricardo Carrero	(Spain) Levante	8 August 1995
	DF	(Spain) Fredi Lobeiras	(Spain) Sporting	1 September 1995
	FW	(Uruguay) Julio Rodríguez	(Uruguay) Danubio	15 December 1995

== Competitions ==
=== Pre-season ===
Friendlies
Kick Off	Opponents	H / A	Result	Scorers
1995-08-05	(Spain) Rialp	A	15 – 0	Salillas (4), Cela (3), Sola (2), Sanchís (2), Roa (2), Besora, Lizarralde
1995-08-13	(Spain) Nàstic	A	0 – 0	
1995-08-17	(Spain) Athletic Bilbao	H	3 – 1	Lente 5', Salillas 80', 82' (pen.)
1995-08-23	(Spain) Balaguer	A	2 – 0	Sola (2)
1995-08-27	(Spain) Jaén	A	2 – 1	

Copa Catalunya
Kick Off	Opponents	H / A	Result	Scorers
1995-08-20	(Spain) Joventut Bisbalenca	N	1 – 0	Sanchís 44'
1995-08-20	(Spain) Manlleu	A	3 – 0	Salillas 27' (pen.), 33' (pen.), Sola 40'
1995-08-28	(Spain) Tàrrega	H	1 – 0	Sola
1995-08-28	(Spain) FC Barcelona	H	0 – 0	

=== Segunda División ===
Kick Off	Opponents	H / A	Result	Scorers	Referee	Pos	Report
1995-09-03 19:30	Badajoz	H	2 – 1	Čampara 76', Sola 80'	Bueno Grimal	7th	MR
1995-09-10 18:00	Eibar	A	1 – 1	Salillas 47'	Muñoz Juste	7th	MR
1995-09-17 18:00	Mallorca	H	1 – 2	Palau 15'	Torija Arroyo	11th	MR
1995-09-23 18:00	Barcelona B	A	1 – 1	Sola 52'	Pérez Lasa	12th	MR
1995-10-01 12:00	Hércules	H	0 – 2		Navas Lasa	15th	MR
1995-10-07 18:00	Getafe	A	3 – 2	Salillas 19', 38', Sanchís 71'	Medina Cantalejo	13th	MR
1995-10-14 18:00	Osasuna	H	1 – 1	Sanchís 4'	Eleicegui Uranga	12th	MR
1995-10-21 17:00	Écija	A	0 – 0		Román González	12th	MR
1995-10-28 18:00	Real Madrid B	A	1 – 3	Salillas 62'	Rodríguez Santiago	14th	MR
1995-11-05 17:00	Marbella	H	1 – 0	Babunski 33' (pen.)	Contador Crespo	11th	MR
1995-11-11 17:30	Sestao	A	1 – 4	Segura 71'	De Mora Expósito	13th	MR
1995-11-19 17:00	Toledo	H	0 – 2		Hernanz Angulo	15th	MR
1995-11-25 17:30	Villarreal	A	1 – 2	Salillas 72'	Losantos Omar	16th	MR
1995-12-03 17:00	Almería	H	1 – 1	Čampara 37'	Pérez Burrull	16th	MR
1995-12-09 17:30	Leganés	A	1 – 1	Carrero 49'	Pinar Martínez	16th	MR
1995-12-17 17:00	Logroñés	H	2 – 0	Carrero 1', Sanchís 88'	Rodríguez Santiago	14th	MR
1995-12-20 20:30	Alavés	A	0 – 1		García Domínguez	15th	MR
1996-01-06 17:30	Extremadura	H	1 – 3	Salillas 29'	Campos Andreu	16th	MR
1996-01-13 17:30	Bilbao Athletic	A	1 – 1	Babunski 25' (pen.)	Pérez Izquierdo	16th	MR
1996-01-21 17:00	Badajoz	A	1 – 3	Rodríguez 25'	Gordillo Flórez	17th	MR
1996-01-24 20:30	Eibar	H	3 – 0	Rodríguez 7', 13', Roa 41'	Muñoz Juste	17th	MR
1996-01-27 17:30	Mallorca	A	0 – 0		Bueno Grimal	17th	MR
1996-02-03 17:30	Barcelona B	H	2 – 1	Salillas 30' (pen.), Roa 50'	Román González	16th	MR
1996-02-10 17:30	Hércules	A	1 – 1	Cela 44'	Medina Cantalejo	15th	MR
1996-02-18 17:00	Getafe	H	1 – 0	Salilla 27'	Pérez Lasa	14th	MR
1996-02-24 17:30	Osasuna	A	1 – 1	Čampara 60'	Navas Lasa	14th	MR
1996-03-03 17:00	Écija	H	4 – 0	Elcacho 25', Rodríguez 27', Cela 49', Salillas 70'	Villacampa Duque	14th	MR
1996-03-09 17:30	Real Madrid B	H	0 – 3		Pérez Izquierdo	14th	MR
1996-03-17 17:00	Marbella	A	0 – 0		Rodríguez Santiago	14th	MR
1996-03-24 17:00	Sestao	H	1 – 0	Cela 48'	Mora Expósito	12th	MR
1996-03-31 17:00	Toledo	A	0 – 1		Bueno Grimal	14th	MR
1996-04-06 17:30	Villarreal	H	1 – 0	Lobeiras 1'	Eleicegui Uranga	12th	MR
1996-04-14 17:00	Almería	A	0 – 0		Pérez Lasa	12th	MR
1996-04-21 17:00	Leganés	H	4 – 1	Rodríguez 17', 79', Vicente 59', Sanchís 89'	Hernanz Angulo	11th	MR
1996-04-28 17:00	Logroñés	A	1 – 3	Salillas 44' (pen.)	García Domínguez	11th	MR
1996-05-05 18:00	Alavés	H	0 – 3		Villacampa Duque	11th	MR
1996-05-11 17:30	Extremadura	A	0 – 4		Contador Crespo	12th	MR
1996-05-19 19:00	Bilbao Athletic	H	1 – 0	Sanchís 11'	Pérez Izquierdo	11th	MR

=== Copa del Rey ===
Round	Kick Off	Opponents	H / A	Result	Scorers	Referee
R1	1995-09-07 20:30	Gramenet	A	2 – 0	Lente 38' (pen.), Sanchís 77'	Villacampa Duque
R1	1995-09-20 20:30	Gramenet	H	4 – 1	Lente 19', 28' (pen.), 33', Roa 35'	Contador Crespo
R2	1995-10-25 20:30	Écija	H	0 – 2		Bueno Grimal
R2	1995-11-08 21:15	Écija	A	1 – 0	Babunski 76'	Campos Andreu

=== Results summary ===
Overall								Home						Away					
Pld	W	D	L	GF	GA	GD	Pts	W	D	L	GF	GA	GD	W	D	L	GF	GA	GD
38	12	12	14	40	49	−9	48	11	2	6	26	20	+6	1	10	8	14	29	−15

Last updated: 2010-09-12.
Source: RFEF
