= Juan Pablo (footballer, born 1978) =

Spanish footballer (born 1978)

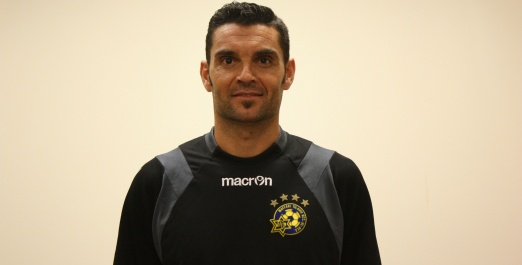
- Juan Pablo with Maccabi Tel Aviv in 2014

Personal information
- Full name: Juan Pablo Colinas Ferreras
- Date of birth: 2 September 1978 (age 48)
- Place of birth: León, Spain
- Height: 1.89 m (6 ft 2 1/2 in)
- Position: Goalkeeper

Youth career
- Cultural Leonesa

Senior career*
Years	Team	Apps	(Gls)
1998–2000	Cultural B		
2000–2002	Alavés B	69	(0)
2002–2005	Alavés	15	(0)
2005–2007	Numancia	71	(0)
2007–2008	Tenerife	29	(0)
2008–2009	Numancia	37	(0)
2009–2013	Sporting Gijón	120	(0)
2013–2015	Maccabi Tel Aviv	61	(0)
2016	Numancia	4	(0)
2017–2018	AEK Larnaca	39	(0)
Total		445	(0)
- * Club domestic league appearances and goals

Juan Pablo Colinas Ferreras (born 2 September 1978), known as Juan Pablo, is a Spanish former professional footballer who played as a goalkeeper.

== Club career ==
Born in León, Castile and León, Juan Pablo began his professional career with his hometown club Cultural y Deportiva Leonesa, moving to Deportivo Alavés in 2000. In his first season with the first team, he served as a backup to Frenchman Richard Dutruel (formerly of FC Barcelona), but could never break into the starting eleven, only totalling 15 league appearances in three years, the last two being spent in the Segunda División. His first La Liga match occurred on 22 September 2002, in a 1–0 away win against Villarreal CF.

Subsequently, Juan Pablo moved to CD Numancia, also in the second tier, being heavily featured over two seasons. After a challenging campaign at CD Tenerife– he began as a starter but failed to appear in the final months – he returned to the Soria side, playing all the games but one in that year's top flight, in an eventual relegation.

Juan Pablo terminated his contract with Numancia in June 2009, and signed a three-year deal with Sporting de Gijón. He did not miss one single minute in his first season, as the Asturians retained their top-division status for another year (Iván Cuéllar, the previous starter, suffered another serious injury, this time in the knee).

On 10 July 2013, Juan Pablo agreed to a one-year contract with Maccabi Tel Aviv F.C. of the Israeli Premier League. He made his debut for the club seven days later, in a 2–0 away victory over Győri ETO FC in the qualifying rounds of the UEFA Champions League.

Juan Pablo returned to Numancia for a third spell on 12 January 2016. On 1 September, the 38-year-old announced his retirement from professional football. However, he returned to action shortly after, going on to spend one and a half seasons with AEK Larnaca FC of the Cypriot First Division.

In January 2023, Juan Pablo returned to Maccabi Tel Aviv as goalkeeper coach. He worked again under head coach Óscar García at AFC Ajax.

== Career statistics ==
Appearances and goals by club, season and competition
Club	Season	League			National cup		League cup		Continental		Other		Total	
Club	Season	Division	Apps	Goals	Apps	Goals	Apps	Goals	Apps	Goals	Apps	Goals	Apps	Goals
Alavés B	2000–01	Segunda División B	37	0	—		—		—		—		37	0
Alavés B	2001–02	Segunda División B	32	0	—		—		—		—		32	0
Alavés B	Total		69	0	—		—		—		—		69	0
Alavés	2000–01	La Liga	0	0	0	0	—		—		—		0	0
Alavés	2001–02	La Liga	0	0	0	0	—		—		—		0	0
Alavés	2002–03	La Liga	5	0	0	0	—		—		—		5	0
Alavés	2003–04	Segunda División	5	0	8	0	—		—		—		13	0
Alavés	2004–05	Segunda División	5	0	1	0	—		—		—		6	0
Alavés	Total		15	0	9	0	—		—		—		24	0
Numancia	2005–06	Segunda División	30	0	0	0	—		—		—		30	0
Numancia	2006–07	Segunda División	41	0	0	0	—		—		—		41	0
Numancia	Total		71	0	0	0	—		—		—		71	0
Tenerife	2007–08	Segunda División	29	0	0	0	—		—		—		29	0
Numancia	2008–09	La Liga	37	0	0	0	—		—		—		37	0
Sporting Gijón	2009–10	La Liga	38	0	0	0	—		—		—		38	0
Sporting Gijón	2010–11	La Liga	25	0	0	0	—		—		—		25	0
Sporting Gijón	2011–12	La Liga	37	0	0	0	—		—		—		37	0
Sporting Gijón	2012–13	Segunda División	20	0	0	0	—		—		—		20	0
Sporting Gijón	Total		120	0	0	0	—		—		—		120	0
Maccabi Tel Aviv	2013–14	Israeli Premier League	33	0	0	0	—		12	0	—		45	0
Maccabi Tel Aviv	2014–15	Israeli Premier League	27	0	3	0	1	0	6	0	—		37	0
Maccabi Tel Aviv	2015–16	Israeli Premier League	1	0	—		1	0	6	0	1	0	9	0
Maccabi Tel Aviv	Total		61	0	3	0	2	0	24	0	1	0	91	0
Numancia	2015–16	Segunda División	4	0	—		—		—		—		4	0
AEK Larnaca	2016–17	Cypriot First Division	5	0	2	0	—		—		—		7	0
AEK Larnaca	2017–18	Cypriot First Division	34	0	3	0	—		8	0	—		45	0
AEK Larnaca	Total		39	0	5	0	—		8	0	—		52	0
Career total			445	0	17	0	3	0	32	0	1	0	498	0

== Honours ==
Maccabi Tel-Aviv

- Israeli Premier League: 2013–14, 2014–15
- Israel State Cup: 2014–15
- Toto Cup: 2014–15

AEK Larnaca

- Cypriot Cup: 2017–18
