= 2000–01 FC Barcelona season =

102nd season in existence of FC Barcelona

Barcelona
2000–01 season
- President: Joan Gaspart
- Head Coach: Lorenzo Serra Ferrer (until 23 April 2001); Carles Rexach (from 23 April 2001)
- Stadium: Camp Nou
- La Liga: 4th
- Copa del Rey: Semi-finals
- UEFA Champions League: Group stage (3rd)
- UEFA Cup: Semi-finals
- Top goalscorer: League: Rivaldo (23); All: Rivaldo (36)
Home colours	Away colours

Barcelona continued the frustrating run of league title drought, finishing just fourth in La Liga, despite having bought Marc Overmars and Emmanuel Petit for a total of £54m in transfer fees in the summer of 2000. Barcelona also controversially sold Luís Figo to arch-rivals Real Madrid in July 2000 and thus creating several furious fan reactions, accusing Luís Figo of being a traitor. New coach Lorenzo Serra Ferrer was not finding consistent form with the team and was being put under increasing pressure; when Barcelona looked to be missing out on Champions League qualification, he was sacked in late April 2001. Barcelona dramatically sealed Champions League third qualifying spot in the season finale, thanks to a Rivaldo hat-trick which included a bicycle kick goal against Valencia.

== Squad ==
=== First team squad ===
Correct as of 3 October 2009. Note: Flags indicate national team as defined under FIFA eligibility rules; some limited exceptions apply. Players may hold more than one non-FIFA nationality.

No.	Pos.	Nation	Player
1	GK	FRA	Richard Dutruel
2	DF	NED	Michael Reiziger
3	DF	NED	Frank de Boer
4	MF	ESP	Pep Guardiola (captain)
5	DF	ESP	Abelardo Fernández
6	MF	ESP	Iván de la Peña
7	FW	ESP	Alfonso Pérez
8	MF	NED	Phillip Cocu
9	FW	NED	Patrick Kluivert
10	MF	BRA	Rivaldo
11	MF	NED	Marc Overmars
12	DF	ESP	Sergi Barjuán
14	MF	ESP	Gerard López
15	MF	FIN	Jari Litmanen

No.	Pos.	Nation	Player
16	MF	ESP	Xavi Hernández
17	MF	FRA	Emmanuel Petit
18	MF	ESP	Gabri García
19	FW	ESP	Dani García
20	MF	POR	Simão Sabrosa
21	MF	ESP	Luis Enrique
23	MF	NED	Boudewijn Zenden
24	DF	ESP	Carles Puyol
25	GK	ESP	Francesc Arnau
26	DF	ESP	Ibán Cuadrado
28	MF	ESP	Sergio Santamaría
30	DF	ESP	David Bermudo
35	GK	ESP	Pepe Reina

=== Reserve squad ===
Note: Flags indicate national team as defined under FIFA eligibility rules; some limited exceptions apply. Players may hold more than one non-FIFA nationality.

No.	Pos.	Nation	Player
29	DF	ESP	Nano
32	DF	ESP	Fernando Navarro
36	GK	ESP	Víctor Valdés
—	MF	BRA	Thiago Motta

=== Transfers ===
==== In ====
No.	Pos.	Nat.	Name	Age	EU	Moving from	Type	Transfer window	Ends	Transfer fee	Source
11	MF	(Netherlands)	Overmars	27	EU	Arsenal (England)	Transfer	Summer	2004	€40M	
17	MF	(France)	Petit	29	EU	Arsenal (England)	Transfer	Summer	2001	€14M	
1	GK	(France)	Dutruel	27	EU	Celta Vigo	Transfer	Summer	2002	€4M	
7	FW	(Spain)	Alfonso	27	EU	Betis	Transfer	Summer	2002	€16.5M	
6	MF	(Spain)	De la Peña	24	EU	Lazio (Italy)	Loan	Summer	2001	N/A	
14	MF	(Spain)	Gerard	23	EU	Valencia	Transfer	Summer	2005	€22M	
13	GK	(Spain)	Pepe Reina	17	EU	Youth system	Promote	Summer	N/A	Free	
18	MF	(Spain)	Gabri	21	EU	Youth system	Promote	Summer	N/A	Free	

Total spending: ▼€78.5 million

==== Out ====
No.	Pos.	Nat.	Name	Age	EU	Moving to	Type	Transfer window	Transfer fee	Source
7	MF	(Portugal)	Figo	27	EU	Real Madrid	Transfer	Summer	€60M	
6	MF	(Netherlands)	R. de Boer	30	EU	Rangers (Scotland)	Transfer	Summer	€5.5M	
3	DF	(France)	Déhu	27	EU	Paris Saint-Germain (France)	Transfer	Summer	€3.4M	
14	FW	(Nigeria)	Amunike	29	EU	Albacete	Transfer	Summer	Free	
17	DF	(Netherlands)	Bogarde	29	EU	Chelsea (England)	Transfer	Summer	Free	
1	GK	(Netherlands)	Hesp	34	EU	Fortuna Sittard (Netherlands)	Transfer	Summer	Free	
34	MF	(Spain)	Arteta	18	EU	Paris Saint-Germain (France)	Loan	Summer	N/A	

Total income: ▲€69.9 million

Last updated: 7 October

== Competitions ==
=== Pre-season and friendlies ===
GAMES 2000–2001
Date	Opponent	Score	Notes
29 July 2000	WHC	14–0	
31 July 2000	QUICK 1890	10–0	
3 August 2000	Arsenal	2–1	Amsterdam Tournament.
5 August 2000	Lazio	3–3	Amsterdam Tournament.
8 August 2000	NEC	5–2	
22 August 2000	PSV Eindhoven	2–1	Joan Gamper Trophy.
26 August 2000	Málaga	1–1 (5–3 p)	Trofeo Balompédica Linense.
29 November 2000	SELECT LA LIGA	1–2	
26 April 2001	Gramenet	3–0	Copa Catalunya (semifinal)
22 May 2001	Arsenal	2–0	
4 June 2001	Real Sociedad	0–0	
4 June 2001	Espanyol	1–0	
13 June 2001	Balaguer	2–2 (3–4 p)	Copa Catalunya (Final)

=== La Liga ===
==== League table ====
Pos	Team	Pld	W	D	L	GF	GA	GD	Pts	Qualification or relegation
2	Deportivo La Coruña	38	22	7	9	73	44	+29	73	Qualification for the Champions League group stage
3	Mallorca	38	20	11	7	61	43	+18	71	Qualification for the Champions League third qualifying round
4	Barcelona	38	17	12	9	80	57	+23	63 (Note: VAL 0–1 BAR; BAR 3–2 VAL)	Qualification for the Champions League third qualifying round
5	Valencia	38	18	9	11	55	34	+21	63	Qualification for the UEFA Cup first round
6	Celta Vigo	38	16	11	11	51	49	+2	59	Qualification for the UEFA Cup first round

Source: LFP
Rules for classification: 1st points; 2nd head-to-head points; 3rd head-to-head goal difference; 4th head-to-head goals scored; 5th goal difference; 6th number of goals scored; 7th Fair-play points

==== Results by round ====
Round	1	2	3	4	5	6	7	8	9	10	11	12	13	14	15	16	17	18	19	20	21	22	23	24	25	26	27	28	29	30	31	32	33	34	35	36	37	38
Ground	H	A	H	A	A	H	A	H	A	H	A	H	A	H	A	H	A	H	A	A	H	A	H	H	A	H	A	H	A	H	A	H	A	H	A	H	A	H
Result	W	L	W	L	W	W	L	D	W	L	L	W	D	W	D	W	W	W	W	D	W	L	L	W	D	D	D	W	D	D	L	D	D	W	W	L	D	W
Position	6	10	5	9	6	3	7	5	4	7	9	6	7	5	6	4	4	4	3	3	3	3	4	4	4	4	4	4	4	5	5	5	5	5	5	5	5	4

Updated to match(es) played on 2008-07-16. Source: LFP.com
A = Away; H = Home; W = Win; D = Draw; L = Loss; = Leader, 2001-02 UEFA Champions League Group stage; = 2001-02 UEFA Champions League Group stage; = 2001-02 UEFA Champions League Qualifying round; = 2001-02 UEFA Cup; = 2001-02 Segunda Division

==== Matches ====
9 September 2000 1	Barcelona	2–1	Málaga	Barcelona
21:00 CEST	Rivaldo 29', 35'	Report	Silva 75'	Stadium: Camp Nou

16 September 2000 2	Athletic Bilbao	3–1	Barcelona	Bilbao
21:00 CEST	Larrazábal 42' (pen.), 65' (pen.); Yeste 89'	Report	Kluivert 24'	Stadium: Estadio San Mames

23 September 2000 3	Barcelona	3–1	Racing Santander	Barcelona
21:00 CEST	Kluivert 32', 57'; Overmars 89'	Report	Espina 62'	Stadium: Camp Nou

1 October 2000 4	Deportivo La Coruña	2–0	Barcelona	La Coruña
17:00 CEST	Donato 64'; Tristan 76'	Report		Stadium: Estadio Riazor

14 October 2000 5	Real Sociedad	0–6	Barcelona	San Sebastián
21:00 CEST		Report	Rivaldo 2', 30' (pen.); Alfonso 16', 19'; Luis Enrique 36'; Simão 40'	Stadium: Estadio Anoeta

21 October 2000 6	Barcelona	2–0	Real Madrid	Barcelona
21:00 CEST	Luis Enrique 26'; Simão 79'	Report		Stadium: Camp Nou

28 October 2000 7	Mallorca	2–0	Barcelona	Palma de Mallorca
21:00 CEST	Eto'o 10'; Ibagaza 51'	Report		Stadium: Estadio Son Moix

1 November 2000 8	Barcelona	1–1	Numancia	Barcelona
21:00 CET	Rivaldo 46' (pen.)	Report	Rubén Navarro 89'	Stadium: Camp Nou

4 November 2000 9	Las Palmas	0–1	Barcelona	Las Palmas
21:00 WET		Report	Rivaldo 46'

12 November 2000 10	Barcelona	1–2	Villarreal	Barcelona
20:00 CET	Cocu 20'	Report	Victor 1', 58'	Stadium: Camp Nou

19 November 2000 11	Zaragoza	3–1	Barcelona	Zaragoza
20:00 CET	Lanna 42'; Jamelli 50'; José Ignacio 57'	Report	Gerard 89'	Stadium: Estadio La Romareda

26 November 2000 12	Barcelona	2–0	Osasuna	Barcelona
17:00 CET	Kluivert 66'; Sergi Barjuan 89'	Report		Stadium: Camp Nou

2 December 2000 13	Celta Vigo	3–3	Barcelona	Vigo
21:00 CET	Catanha 8', 13', 26'	Report	de Boer 17'; Kluivert 50', 62'	Stadium: Estadio Balaídos

10 December 2000 14	Barcelona	4–2	Espanyol	Barcelona
17:00 CET	Rivaldo 13', 57' (pen.); Xavi 43'; Luis Enrique 61'	Report	Posse 52'; Arteaga 88'	Stadium: Camp Nou

16 December 2000 15	Rayo Vallecano	2–2	Barcelona	Madrid
19:00 CET	Bolić 3'; Pablo Sanz 72' (pen.)	Report	Gerard 8' de Boer 66'	Stadium: Campo Vallecas

20 December 2000 16	Barcelona	3–2	Alavés	Barcelona
20:30 CET	Rivaldo 2', 61'; Kluivert 67'	Report	Javi Moreno 75' (pen.); Magno 77'	Stadium: Camp Nou

7 January 2001 17	Oviedo	2–3	Barcelona	Oviedo
20:00 CET	Onopko 65'; Iván Ania 67'	Report	Kluivert 8', 56'; Rivaldo 13'	Stadium: Estadio Carlos Tartiere

13 January 2001 18	Barcelona	3–1	Valladolid	Barcelona
21:00 CET	Kluivert 52'; Guardiola 88'; Rivaldo 89'	Report	Caminero 54'	Stadium: Camp Nou

20 January 2001 19	Valencia	0–1	Barcelona	Valencia
21:00 CET		Report	de Boer 6'	Stadium: Estadio Mestalla

27 January 2001 20	Málaga	0–0	Barcelona	Málaga
21:00 CET		Report

3 February 2001 21	Barcelona	7–0	Athletic Bilbao	Barcelona
21:00 CET	Luis Enrique 5', 21', 33'; Cocu 26', 44'; Abelardo 30'; Overmars 66'	Report		Stadium: Camp Nou

11 February 2001 22	Racing Santander	4–0	Barcelona	Santander
20:00 CET	Regueiro 35'; Ramis 47'; Arzeno 52'; Mazzoni 75'	Report		Stadium: Estadio El Sardinero

17 February 2001 23	Barcelona	2–3	Deportivo La Coruña	Barcelona
21:00 CET	Rivaldo 14' (pen.); Luis Enrique 34'	Report	Djalminha 5'; Victor 76', 89'	Stadium: Camp Nou

25 February 2001 24	Barcelona	3–0	Real Sociedad	Barcelona
20:00 CET	Kluivert 38', 61'; Xavi 78'	Report		Stadium: Camp Nou

3 March 2001 25	Real Madrid	2–2	Barcelona	Madrid
21:00 CET	Raúl 6', 36'	Report	Rivaldo 35', 69'	Stadium: Estadio Santiago Bernabéu

11 March 2001 26	Barcelona	1–1	Mallorca	Barcelona
19:00 CET	Rivaldo 73' (pen.)	Report	Rivaldo 35' (o.g.)	Stadium: Camp Nou

18 March 2001 27	Numancia	1–1	Barcelona	Soria
17:00 CET	Rubén Navarro 62'	Report	Kluivert 31'	Stadium: Los Pajaritos

1 April 2001 28	Barcelona	4–1	Las Palmas	Barcelona
19:00 CEST	Gabri 14'; Overmars 43'; Rivaldo 71'; Dani 74'	Report	Guayre 7'	Stadium: Camp Nou

8 April 2001 29	Villarreal	4–4	Barcelona	Villarreal
18:00 CEST	Victor 11', 20'; Calleja 18'; Jorge López 65'	Report	Kluivert 38', 54', 90+2'; Rivaldo 60'	Stadium: Estadio de la Cerámica

14 April 2001 30	Barcelona	4–4	Zaragoza	Barcelona
21:00 CEST	Overmars 52'; Kluivert 77', 80'; Rivaldo 89'	Report	Juan Esnáider 52', 79'; Jamelli 44'; José Ignacio 74'	Stadium: Camp Nou

22 April 2001 31	Osasuna	3–1	Barcelona	Pamplona
18:00 CEST	Rossado 17', 84'; Fernández 27'	Report	Overmars 19'	Stadium: Estadio Reyno de Navarra

29 April 2001 32	Barcelona	1–1	Celta Vigo	Barcelona
20:00 CEST	Gabri 29'	Report	Mostovoi 3'	Stadium: Camp Nou

5 May 2001 33	Espanyol	0–0	Barcelona	Barcelona
		Report		Stadium: Estadio Lluys Company

13 May 2001 34	Barcelona	5–1	Rayo Vallecano	Barcelona
	Luis Enrique 6', 68'; Rivaldo 51'; Overmars 75'; Petit 90+2'	Report	Michel 17'	Stadium: Camp Nou

17 May 2001 35	Alavés	0–1	Barcelona	Vitoria
		Report	Overmars 17'

27 May 2001 36	Barcelona	0–1	Oviedo	Barcelona
		Report	Jaime 47'	Stadium: Camp Nou

9 June 2001 37	Valladolid	2–2	Barcelona	Valladolid
	Kaviedes 60'; Turiel 61'	Report	Guardiola 3'; Overmars 82'	Stadium: Estadio Jose Zorrilla

16 June 2001 38	Barcelona	3–2	Valencia	Barcelona
	Rivaldo 3', 45', 88'	Report	Baraja 25', 46'	Stadium: Camp Nou

=== UEFA Champions League ===
==== First Group stage ====
Group H

Team	Pld	W	D	L	GF	GA	GD	Pts	MIL	LU	BAR	BJK
(Italy) Milan	6	3	2	1	12	6	+6	11		1–1	3–3	4–1
(England) Leeds United	6	2	3	1	9	6	+3	9	1–0		1–1	6–0
(Spain) Barcelona	6	2	2	2	13	9	+4	8	0–2	4–0		5–0
(Turkey) Beşiktaş	6	1	1	4	4	17	−13	4	0–2	0–0	3–0	

13 September 2000	Barcelona (Spain)	4–0	(England) Leeds United	Barcelona
20:45	Rivaldo 10'; De Boer 20'; Kluivert 75', 84'	Report		Stadium: Camp Nou; Attendance: 85,000; Referee: (Germany) Markus Merk

19 September 2000	Beşiktaş (Turkey)	3–0	(Spain) Barcelona	Istanbul
20:45	Ahmet Dursun 38', 75'; Nouma 87'	Report		Stadium: BJK İnönü Stadium; Attendance: 30,000; Referee: (France) Claude Colombo

26 September 2000	Barcelona (Spain)	0–2	(Italy) Milan	Barcelona
20:45		Report	Coco 45+1'; Bierhoff 71'	Stadium: Camp Nou; Attendance: 98,000; Referee: (Germany) Hellmut Krug

18 October 2000	Milan (Italy)	3–3	(Spain) Barcelona	Milan
20:45	Albertini 26', 39'; José Mari 45'	Report	Rivaldo 19', 43', 68'	Stadium: San Siro; Attendance: 79,945; Referee: (Scotland) Hugh Dallas

24 October 2000	Leeds United (England)	1–1	(Spain) Barcelona	Leeds
20:45	Bowyer 5'	Report	Rivaldo 90+4'	Stadium: Elland Road; Attendance: 36,721; Referee: (Norway) Terje Hauge

8 November 2000	Barcelona (Spain)	5–0	(Turkey) Beşiktaş	Barcelona
20:45	Cocu 11'; Luis Enrique 17', 49'; Rivaldo 81' (pen.); Gabri 88'	Report		Stadium: Camp Nou; Attendance: 55,000; Referee: (Switzerland) Urs Meier

=== UEFA Cup ===
==== Third round ====
23 November 2000	Club Brugge (Belgium)	0–2	(Spain) Barcelona	Jan Breydel Stadium, Bruges
20;30		Report UEFA Report	Rivaldo 24'; Kluivert 30'	Attendance: 27,624; Referee: Konrad Plautz (Austria)

7 December 2000	Barcelona (Spain)	1–1	(Belgium) Club Brugge	Camp Nou, Barcelona
20;45	Rivaldo 17' (pen.)	Report UEFA Report	Verheyen 26'	Attendance: 35,000; Referee: Herbert Fandel (Germany)

==== Eightfinals ====
15 February 2001	AEK Athens (Greece)	0–1	(Spain) Barcelona	Nikos Goumas Stadium, Athens
20:30		Report UEFA Report	Luis Enrique 41'	Attendance: 24,404; Referee: Graham Poll (England)

22 February 2001	Barcelona (Spain)	5–0	(Greece) AEK Athens	Camp Nou, Barcelona
21:00	Luis Enrique 22', 31', 60'; Rivaldo 57'; Gerard 87' (pen.)	Report UEFA Report		Attendance: 33,623; Referee: Stefano Braschi (Italy)

==== Quarter-finals ====
8 March 2001	Barcelona	2–1	Celta Vigo	Barcelona
	Kluivert 13', 55'	Report UEFA	Coira 68'	Stadium: Camp Nou

15 March 2001	Celta Vigo	3–2	Barcelona	Vigo
	Catanha 33'; G. López 63' (pen.); Mostovoi 90'	Report UEFA	Rivaldo 28', 42'	Stadium: Estadio Balaídos

==== Semi-finals ====
5 April 2001	Barcelona (Spain)	0–0	(England) Liverpool	Camp Nou, Barcelona
21:15		Report UEFA Report		Attendance: 90,832; Referee: Hellmut Krug (Germany)

19 April 2001	Liverpool (England)	1–0	(Spain) Barcelona	Anfield, Liverpool
20:05	McAllister 44' (pen.)	Report UEFA Report		Attendance: 44,203; Referee: Urs Meier (Switzerland)

=== Copa del Rey ===
Round of 64

12 December 2000	Gandia	0–3	Barcelona
			Gerard 27'; Enrique 71'; Guardiola 78'

Round of 32

3 January 2001	Ceuta	0–3	Barcelona
			Alfonso 56', 73'; Kluivert 87'

Round of 16

10 January 2001	Gimnastica Torrelavega	0–1	Barcelona
			Rivaldo 74'

16 January 2001	Barcelona	0–0	Gimnastica Torrelavega	Barcelona
				Stadium: Camp Nou

Quarter-finals

30 January 2001	Espanyol	1–2	Barcelona	Barcelona
	Tamudo 57'		Rivaldo 13'; Alfonso 41'	Stadium: Estadio Lluys Company

7 February 2001	Barcelona	1–1	Espanyol
	de Boer 6'		Roger 19'

==== Semi-finals ====
21 June 2001	Celta Vigo	3–1	Barcelona	Vigo
	Berizzo 45'; Mostovoy 51'; Jesuli 70'		Simão 6'	Stadium: Estadio Balaídos

24 June 2001	Barcelona	1–1	Celta Vigo	Barcelona
	Kluivert 4'		Berizzo 2'	Stadium: Camp Nou

== Statistics ==
=== Players statistics ===
No.	Pos	Nat	Player	Total		La Liga		Copa del Rey		Champions League		UEFA Cup	
No.	Pos	Nat	Player	Apps	Goals	Apps	Goals	Apps	Goals	Apps	Goals	Apps	Goals
35	GK	(Spain) ESP	Reina	33	-43	18+1	-32	7	-5	0	0	7	-6
2	DF	(Netherlands) NED	Reiziger	40	0	22+3	0	7	0	2+1	0	5	0
3	DF	(Netherlands) NED	De Boer	52	5	31+3	3	5+2	1	3+1	1	7	0
5	DF	(Spain) ESP	Abelardo	31	1	18+1	1	3	0	6	0	3	0
12	DF	(Spain) ESP	Sergi	52	1	30+3	1	6	0	6	0	7	0
21	MF	(Spain) ESP	Luis Enrique	41	16	27+1	9	4	1	3+1	2	5	4
8	MF	(Netherlands) NED	Cocu	55	4	32+3	3	6+1	0	5	1	8	0
4	MF	(Spain) ESP	Guardiola	37	3	21+3	2	3+3	1	0	0	7	0
11	MF	(Netherlands) NED	Overmars	46	8	26+5	8	3+2	0	2+1	0	7	0
10	FW	(Brazil) BRA	Rivaldo	53	36	34+1	23	3+2	2	6	6	7	5
9	FW	(Netherlands) NED	Kluivert	48	25	30+1	18	3+2	2	3+1	2	8	3
1	GK	(France) FRA	Dutruel	22	-26	15	-16	1	-1	5	-9	0+1	0
20	MF	(Portugal) POR	Simao	38	3	20+5	2	4	1	6	0	1+2	0
18	MF	(Spain) ESP	Gabri	37	3	20+5	2	5+1	0	0+1	1	5	0
16	MF	(Spain) ESP	Xavi	36	2	15+5	2	6+1	0	3	0	1+5	0
24	DF	(Spain) ESP	Puyol	24	0	15+2	0	2	0	3	0	2	0
17	MF	(France) FRA	Petit	38	1	13+10	1	5	0	3+1	0	3+3	0
14	MF	(Spain) ESP	Gerard	39	4	12+12	2	3+2	1	3+2	0	2+3	1
23	MF	(Netherlands) NED	Zenden	18	0	5+5	0	3	0	0+1	0	2+2	0
25	GK	(Spain) ESP	Arnau	8	-9	5+1	-9	0	0	1	0	1	0
7	FW	(Spain) ESP	Alfonso	32	5	4+13	2	5+3	3	2+2	0	0+3	0
19	FW	(Spain) ESP	Dani García	26	1	4+10	1	3+2	0	2+4	0	0+1	0
6	MF	(Spain) ESP	De la Peña	13	0	1+8	0	0+1	0	2+1	0	0	0
30	DF	(Spain) ESP	Bermudo	1	0	0	0	1	0	0	0	0	0
15	MF	(Finland) FIN	Litmanen	0	0	0	0	0	0	0	0	0	0
28	MF	(Spain) ESP	Santamaria	2	0	0+1	0	0	0	0	0	0+1	0

== See also ==
- FC Barcelona
- 2000–01 UEFA Champions League
- 2000–01 La Liga
- 2000–01 Copa del Rey
- 2000–01 UEFA Cup
