= Jordi Cruyff =

Dutch footballer and manager (born 1974)

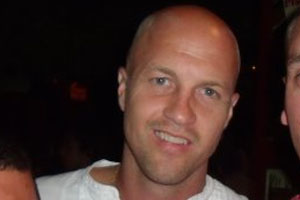
- Cruyff in 2009

Personal information
- Full name: Johan Jordi Cruijff
- Date of birth: 9 February 1974 (age 52)
- Place of birth: Amsterdam, Netherlands
- Height: 1.85 m (6 ft 1 in)
- Position: Attacking midfielder

Team information
- Current team: Ajax (Technical director)

Youth career
- 1981–1988: Ajax
- 1988–1992: Barcelona

Senior career*
Years	Team	Apps	(Gls)
1992–1994	Barcelona B	47	(14)
1994–1996	Barcelona	41	(11)
1996–2000	Manchester United	34	(8)
1999	→ Celta Vigo (loan)	8	(2)
2000–2003	Alavés	94	(8)
2003–2004	Espanyol	30	(3)
2006–2008	Metalurh Donetsk	28	(0)
2009–2010	Valletta	17	(10)
Total		299	(56)

International career
1996	Netherlands	9	(1)
1995–2004	Catalonia	9	(2)

Managerial career
- 2017–2018: Maccabi Tel Aviv
- 2018–2019: Chongqing Dangdai Lifan
- 2020: Ecuador
- 2020–2021: Shenzhen FC
- * Club domestic league appearances and goals

Johan Jordi Cruijff (anglicised to Cruyff; born 9 February 1974) is a Dutch-Spanish professional football director, coach, and former player. Following an appointment in December 2025, he is the technical director at Ajax.

He is the son of footballer Johan Cruyff. He played from 1992 through to 2010, including periods with Barcelona and Manchester United. He earned nine caps for the Netherlands national team, playing at UEFA Euro 1996, and he won the Premier League title in 1997 while at Manchester United.

Cruyff played mainly as an attacking midfielder, although he could also perform as a second striker. In his later years, notably with Metalurh Donetsk, he also played as a centre back. After starting his career with Barcelona and playing for the Netherlands aged 22, Cruyff's career stalled while at Manchester United, as he appeared just 36 times in the league over four years largely because of injuries. He had a successful period with Alavés, helping the club to reach the 2001 UEFA Cup Final. He also played for Celta Vigo, Espanyol and finished his playing career with Valletta in the Maltese Premier League.

Under his stewardship as Maccabi Tel Aviv's sporting director, the club regained its dominance in Israeli football. The team won consecutive league titles from 2012 to 2015, as well as regularly qualifying for the Europa League and Champions League. He was the sporting director at FC Barcelona from 2022 to 2025.

== Early life ==
Jordi Cruyff was born by caesarean section in Amsterdam on 9 February 1974, as the third and youngest child of Johan Cruyff and Danny Coster. The birth of Jordi was originally due around 17 February, but as manager Rinus Michels wanted his top player Johan to participate in the crucial away game against arch rivals Real Madrid on that same day, he proposed undergoing caesarean section to Cruyff and his wife to which they agreed. Jordi was coincidentally born on the birthday of manager Michels. Barcelona won the game 0-5, with Johan Cruyff scoring one goal and providing one assist.

Jordi was named after the Catalan patron saint, Sant Jordi, by coincidence. The Franco regime had banned Catalan names in an attempt to suppress nationalism in the region, but as Jordi was born and registered in Amsterdam, the Spanish civil registry could not refuse to register the name, also because his father Johan was adamant to stick to the name as registered in the Netherlands.

== Club career ==
=== Barcelona ===
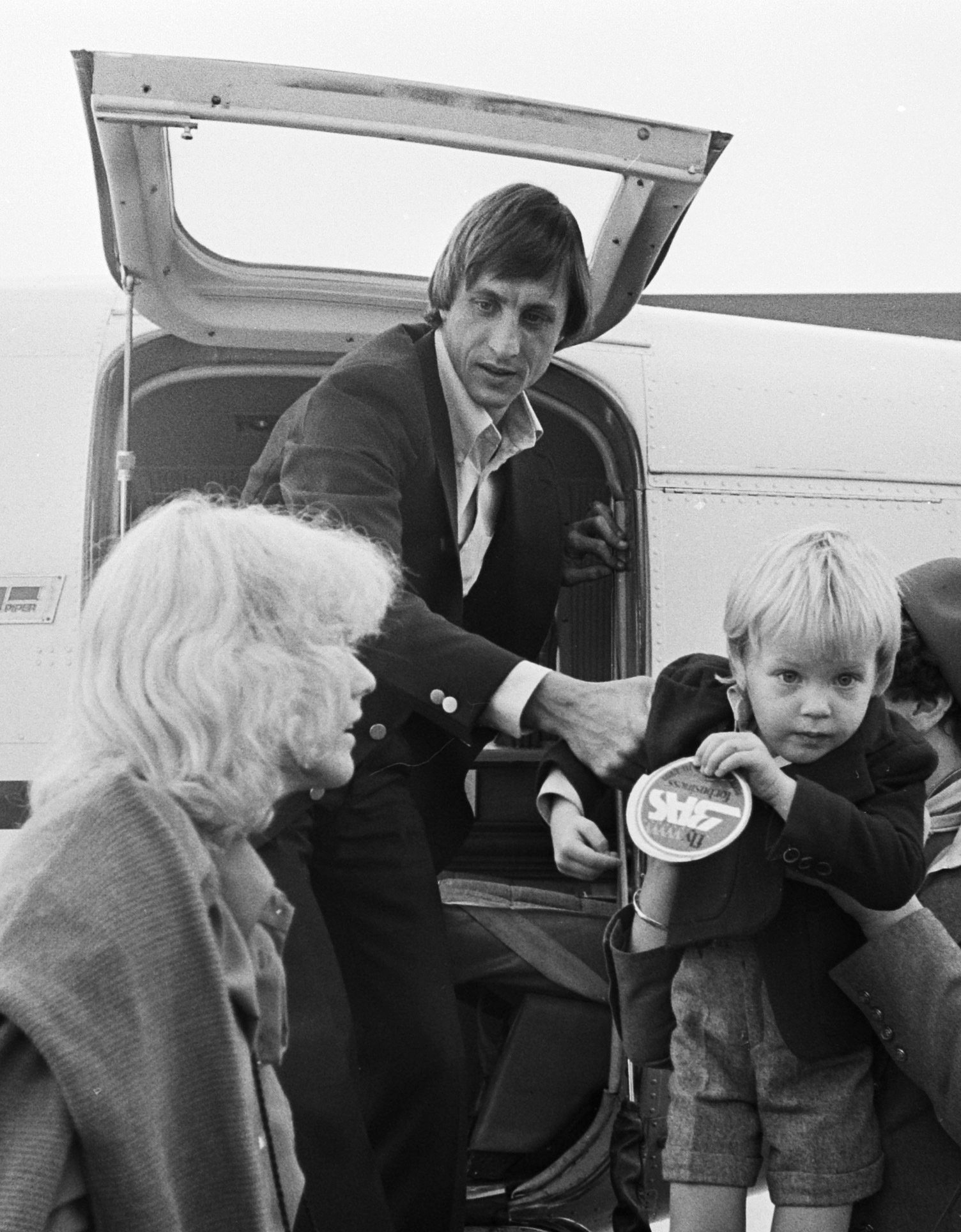
Cruyff with his father Johan and mother Danny Coster in 1977

In 1992, Cruyff made his debut for Barcelona B in the Segunda División, becoming the team's top scorer alongside Óscar García. Two years later, Cruyff was promoted to the senior team (where his father Johan was manager at the time) during a pre-season tour in the Netherlands, where he scored hat-tricks against Groningen and De Graafschap. On 4 September 1994, he made his top flight debut in a 2–1 defeat at Sporting Gijón. On 2 November, he played against Manchester United in the Champions League, setting up the first goal for Hristo Stoichkov, as Barcelona won 4–0.

That season, Barcelona finished fourth in La Liga and Cruyff was one of the team's top scorers alongside Stoichkov and Koeman (9 goals each), despite not being a regular starter. In the final league match of the season against Bilbao in San Mamés, Cruyff provided the assist for the first goal and scored the second goal that guaranteed Barcelona played in Europe the following season.

Despite a positive start to the following campaign, Barcelona finished third, and were runners up in the Copa del Rey. Due to another season without prizes and after continuing struggles with the board of the club, his father Johan was sacked as manager of Barcelona on 18 May 1996. The next day (Sunday 19 May 1996), Jordi Cruyff played his final game for the club against Celta Vigo, at the Camp Nou, and left the field in tears under a standing ovation when he was substituted after 60 minutes.

=== Manchester United ===
In August 1996, Cruyff signed with Manchester United for a fee of £1.5 million on a four-year contract. He made his debut on 11 August in a 4–0 win over Newcastle United in the 1996 FA Charity Shield, and then played in a 3–0 win over Wimbledon, the opening league fixture of the 1996–97 FA Premier League. Cruyff then scored on his next two appearances, helping the team to 2–2 draws against Everton and Blackburn Rovers.

He was a regular in the first team until the end of November 1996, when he suffered another knee injury. Cruyff's spell at Manchester United was marked by injuries, but he played three games in the group stage of the 1998–99 UEFA Champions League. He played eleven times and scored twice in 1998–99 season, before a loan deal with Celta Vigo took him back to Spain in January 1999, and thus denying him the chance to win the treble achieved by the club in May 1999. He scored twice in eight games for the Spaniards before returning for United.

Cruyff's contract expired on 30 June 2000. In four years, he had played a total of 57 games for United and scored eight goals.

=== Return to La Liga ===
After an initial agreement with Harry Redknapp's West Ham United fell through, Cruyff returned to Spain on a free transfer to Alavés. With the Basque club, he reached the 2001 UEFA Cup Final, against Liverpool: despite being 2–0 and then 3–1 down, Alavés embarked on a spirited comeback and Cruyff's goal in the 89th minute tied the game at 4–4. An own goal in extra time saw Liverpool win the trophy. Cruyff continued to play for Alavés until the club was relegated at the end of 2002–03.

The following season, he joined Espanyol, being played regularly in his only season. Cruyff decided against extending his contract with Espanyol and voluntarily left that summer.

=== Later career ===
He then trained with Bolton Wanderers, coached by Sam Allardyce, but failed a medical test. After he temporarily retired in 2004, Cruyff made a return to professional football in 2006, playing two seasons at the Ukrainian side Metalurh Donetsk, where he played mainly as a centre back. At the same time, he entered the fashion business, helping develop the Cruyff clothing brand.

In mid-2009, Cruyff signed a three-year deal as a player-cum-assistant-manager of Maltese side Valletta, assisting first team coach Ton Caanen, a role he admitted he did not take to. He made his debut on 26 July 2009, in a 3–0 win in the Europa League 2009–10 first qualifying round against Icelandic side Keflavík. His first league appearance came on 21 August 2008, in a 3–1 win over Birkirkara. He scored his first goal on 29 August 2009 in a 6–0 win against Floriana. Valletta won the MFA Trophy in Cruyff's first season beating Qormi 2–1, although Cruyff did not play in the final as he was not fully fit.

Despite mostly playing as a defensive player in the latter stages of his career, Cruyff took on a more attacking role with Valletta.

== International career ==
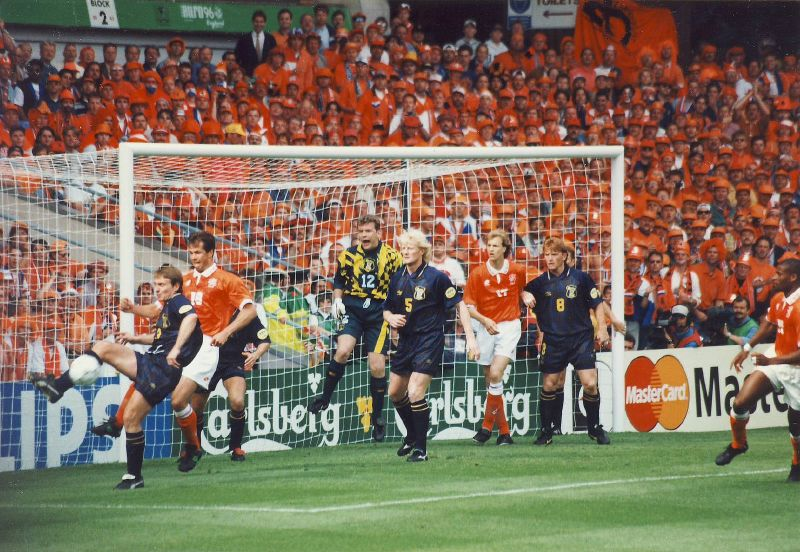
Cruyff (number 17) playing for the Netherlands against Scotland at Villa Park during Euro 96

Cruyff was approached to play at under-21 level by both Spain and the Netherlands. He was unsure which country to represent, and in 1996 he declined the possibility to join the Spanish team for the Olympic Games; meanwhile, his performances for Barcelona persuaded coach Guus Hiddink to include him in the Netherlands squad for UEFA Euro 1996. Cruyff made his debut for the national side in a 2–0 friendly defeat against Germany on 24 April 1996. He scored his only goal for the Netherlands during a 2–0 win against Switzerland at Villa Park on 13 June. He played nine games for the Dutch team, all in 1996.

Cruyff is one of the few Dutch footballers to have played for the Dutch national team while never having played in the Eredivisie.

Between 1995 and 2004, he also made nine appearances for the Catalonia national football team, scoring twice.

== Executive career ==
=== AEK Larnaca ===
In 2010, Cruyff announced his retirement from professional football and joined AEK Larnaca as director of football on a three-year deal. He appointed Ton Caanen as head coach, and the pair worked to establish the team as a new football powerhouse in Cyprus. In his first season, the team finished fourth, and qualified for the Europa League. In his second season, AEK Larnaca qualified for the group stage of the Europa League, after beating Rosenborg in the play-offs.

The participation of the team in the 2011–12 UEFA Europa League was historic for both the club and for Cypriot football, as the club became the first Cypriot team to secure qualification to the Europa League (preceded by Anorthosis and APOEL in the group stages of the Champions League). The team finished fifth that season in the domestic league.

=== Maccabi Tel Aviv ===
In April 2012, Cruyff was appointed by Mitchell Goldhar, owner of Maccabi Tel Aviv, as the sports director of the club, which paid compensation to AEK Larnaca. His initial work included signing Óscar García, then head coach of Barcelona Juvenil A, as the new head coach.

Cruyff's arrival finally put an end to Maccabi Tel Aviv's bad fortunes in the league, as they won their first championship in ten years. Under Cruyff's and Garcia's stewardship, Maccabi dominated the league and claimed the title by thirteen points ahead of their nearest rival. The team finished the season as the league's highest scorers, with 78, whilst only conceding 30 - the fewest in the league.

The 2013–14 season saw a change in the club's coach position, when Cruyff appointed the Portuguese coach, Paulo Sousa to replace Garcia, after the Spanish coach was signed by English Championship side Brighton and Hove Albion. During this period, many players left the club whilst several others were recruited.

The team continued its success in the league competition by claiming another league title by a margin of 16 points. The club also enjoyed success in the Europa League as they advanced to the round of 32 following a difficult group stage, where they beat Bordeaux (twice) and Eintracht Frankfurt before eventually exiting the competition following a loss to Basel.

The 2014–15 season was characterized by a difficult start. Operation Protective Edge meant that the qualifying games to the UEFA Champions League were held away from Israel, leading Maccabi to be ousted from both the Champions League and the Europa League. There was also a change in club manager following Paulo Sousa's appointment at FC Basel. Oscar Garcia briefly returned but left before the beginning of the season when Cruyff appointed Pako Ayestarán, former assistant to Rafael Benítez at Liverpool. Maccabi Tel Aviv became the first Israeli team to win all three local trophies: the Israeli Premier League, the Israel State Cup and the Toto Cup.

In April 2015, Cruyff renewed his contract for a further two years despite interest from English Championship and Bundesliga sides.

In the 2015–16 season, Cruyff appointed Slaviša Jokanović as head coach after the Serbian had promoted Watford to the Premier League. The team qualified for the UEFA Champions League group stages for the first time in 11 years, playing against Chelsea, Porto and Dynamo Kyiv in Group G, before exiting the competition. Cruyff appointed Vitesse's Peter Bosz after Jokanovic signed as the new Fulham's head coach at the end of December.

=== Barcelona ===
On 2 June 2021, Barcelona announced Cruyff's appointment to the role of sporting advisor. Following a transition period, he was officially appointed as the club's sporting director on 1 September 2022. Working in close tandem with director of football Mateu Alemany, Cruyff was instrumental in the club's squad restructuring during a period of significant financial constraint and the activation of economic "levers." He played a key role in the recruitment of players such as Robert Lewandowski, Jules Koundé, and Andreas Christensen.

During the 2022–23 season, his management of the sporting area contributed to Barcelona winning their first La Liga title in four years, as well as the Supercopa de España. Cruyff was praised for his ability to act as a bridge between the board of directors, led by Joan Laporta, and the coaching staff under Xavi. On 16 May 2023, the club announced that Cruyff would not renew his contract at the end of the season, expressing his desire to seek new professional challenges.

=== Indonesia ===
On 25 February 2025, Football Association of Indonesia chairman, Erick Thohir, announced that Cruyff was appointed as technical advisor to the Indonesia national team.

=== Ajax ===
On 28 December 2025, Ajax announced that the club had reached a verbal agreement with Cruyff to join as Director of Football. The appointment was considered a historic milestone for the club, as it saw the Cruyff name return to a formal technical leadership position at Ajax for the first time since the passing of his father, Johan Cruyff, who had previously spearheaded the club's "Velvet Revolution".

Cruyff was tasked with overseeing the club's long-term technical policy, with a specific mandate to re-align the first team's recruitment strategy with the traditional Ajax philosophy and the integration of youth talent from the 'De Toekomst' academy.

== Managerial career ==
=== Maccabi Tel Aviv ===
In his first full season as head coach in the 2017–18 season, Cruyff led Maccabi Tel Aviv to Toto Cup glory, oversaw a second-place league finish and secured European qualification for a sixth successive year since he joined the club in 2012. At the start of that campaign, he successfully guided the team through four qualifying rounds to reach the UEFA Europa League group stage. At the end of the season, he announced his intention to leave the club to begin new experiences.

=== Chongqing Dangdai Lifan ===
On 8 August 2018, Cruyff was appointed as the manager of Chinese Super League side Chongqing Dangdai Lifan. In 2019, he led the club to their best start in Super League history but decided to not renew his contract, and left the club at the end of the season.

=== Ecuador ===
On 3 January 2020, Cruyff reached an agreement to become manager of the Ecuador national team. On 23 July 2020, Cruyff resigned from his position. This came after several major leadership changes in the Ecuadorian Football Federation. Ecuador did not play any matches or hold any training camps in his time as head coach, due to the COVID-19 pandemic.

=== Shenzhen ===
On 14 August 2020, Cruyff was appointed as the manager of Chinese Super League club Shenzhen.

== Personal life ==
Cruyff has one son (Julen) and one daughter (Danae) with his ex-wife Noemi.

He is fluent in Spanish, English, and Dutch, and considers Spanish his first language. Though being the child to Dutch parents, Cruyff only followed formal education in Spanish and learned speaking Dutch by having conversations with his family and by watching Dutch televion at home. He also jokingly remarked that he never learned to speak proper Dutch due to the Cruijffiaans vernicular and expressions used by his late father.

== Career statistics ==
=== Club ===
Appearances and goals by club, season and competition
Club	Season	League			National cup (Note: Includes Copa del Rey, FA Cup, Ukrainian Cup, Maltese FA Trophy)		League cup (Note: Includes Football League Cup)		Europe		Other		Total	
Club	Season	Division	Apps	Goals	Apps	Goals	Apps	Goals	Apps	Goals	Apps	Goals	Apps	Goals
Barcelona	1993–94	La Liga	0	0	0	0	—		0	0	—		0	0
Barcelona	1994–95	La Liga	28	9	2	0	—		5 (Note: Appearances in UEFA Champions League)	0	1 (Note: Appearance in Supercopa de España)	0	36	9
Barcelona	1995–96	La Liga	13	2	1	0	—		4 (Note: Appearances in UEFA Cup)	0	—		18	2
Barcelona	Total		41	11	3	0	—		9	0	1	0	54	11
Manchester United	1996–97	Premier League	16	3	0	0	1	0	4	0	1 (Note: Appearance in FA Charity Shield)	0	22	3
Manchester United	1997–98	Premier League	5	0	1	0	1	0	0	0	1	0	8	0
Manchester United	1998–99	Premier League	5	2	0	0	2	0	3	0	1	0	11	2
Manchester United	1999–2000	Premier League	8	3	0	0	1	0	4	0	4 (Note: Appearance in FA Charity Shield, appearance in UEFA Super Cup, two appearances in FIFA Club World Championship)	0	17	3
Manchester United	Total		34	8	1	0	5	0	11	0	7	0	58	8
Celta Vigo (loan)	1998–99	La Liga	8	2	1	0	—		0	0	—		9	2
Alavés	2000–01	La Liga	35	3	0	0	—		10	4	—		45	7
Alavés	2001–02	La Liga	33	4	0	0	—		—		—		33	4
Alavés	2002–03	La Liga	26	1	3	0	—		3	0	—		32	1
Alavés	Total		94	8	3	0	—		13	4	—		110	12
Espanyol	2003–04	La Liga	30	3	0	0	—		—		—		30	3
Metalurh Donetsk	2006–07	Vyshcha Liha	13	0	3	0	—		—		—		16	0
Metalurh Donetsk	2007–08	Vyshcha Liha	15	0	2	1	—		—		—		17	1
Metalurh Donetsk	Total		28	0	5	1	—		—		—		33	1
Valletta	2009–10	Maltese Premier League	17	10	1	0	—		4 (Note: Appearances in UEFA Europa League)	0	—		22	10
Career total			252	42	14	1	5	0	37	4	8	0	316	47

=== International ===
Appearances and goals by national team and year
National team	Year	Apps	Goals
Netherlands	1996	9	1
Total		9	1

List of international goals scored by Jordi Cruyff
No.	Date	Venue	Opponent	Score	Result	Competition	Ref.
1	13 June 1996	Villa Park, Birmingham, United Kingdom	Switzerland	1–0	2–0	UEFA Euro 1996	

=== Managerial statistics ===
As of 30 May 2021

Team	Nat	From	To	Record				
Team	Nat	From	To	G	W	D	L	Win %
Maccabi Tel Aviv (caretaker)	(Israel)	5 January 2017	10 February 2017	7	6	1	0	85.71
Maccabi Tel Aviv	(Israel)	1 July 2017	30 June 2018	50	29	9	12	58.00
Chongqing Dangdai Lifan	(China)	8 August 2018	14 December 2019	46	14	14	18	30.43
Ecuador	(Ecuador)	13 January 2020	23 July 2020	0	0	0	0	—
Shenzhen FC	(China)	6 September 2020	4 June 2021	17	7	4	6	41.18
Total				120	56	28	36	46.67

== Honours ==
=== Player ===
Barcelona

- Supercopa de España: 1994
- Copa del Rey runner-up: 1995–96

Manchester United

- Premier League: 1996–97
- FA Charity Shield: 1996, 1997
- UEFA Champions League: 1998–99

Alavés

- UEFA Cup runner-up: 2000–01

=== Manager ===
Maccabi Tel Aviv

- Toto Cup: 2017–18

== See also ==
- List of European association football families

== Sources ==
- Barça: A People's Passion (1998), Jimmy Burns.
