= Juan Ochoa =

Juan Ochoa may refer to:

- Juan Cruz Ochoa (born 1979), Spanish former footballer
- Juan David Ochoa (1946–2013), Colombian drug trafficker

== See also ==
- Juan Ochoantezana (1912–1998), Spanish footballer and manager
