= 2001–02 Deportivo Alavés season =

Deportivo Alavés
2001–02 season
- President: Gonzalo Antón
- Head coach: Mané
- Stadium: Mendizorrotza Stadium
- La Liga: 7th
- Copa del Rey: Round of 32
- Average home league attendance: 13,740

The 2001–02 Deportivo Alavés season was the club's 81st season in existence and the club's fourth consecutive season in the top flight of Spanish football. In addition to the domestic league, Alavés participated in this season's edition of the Copa del Rey. The season covered the period from 1 July 2001 to 30 June 2002.

== Pre-season and friendlies ==
Win Draw Loss

9 September 2001 Friendly	Alavés (Spain)	1–0	(Italy) Milan	Vitoria-Gasteiz
--:-- CEST (UTC+2)	Geli 19'			Stadium: Mendizorrotza; Attendance: 12,000; Referee: Omar Losantos (Spain)

== Competitions ==
=== Overview ===
Competition	First match	Last match	Starting round	Final position	Record							
Competition	First match	Last match	Starting round	Final position	Pld	W	D	L	GF	GA	GD	Win %
La Liga	25 August 2001	11 May 2002	Matchday 1		38	17	3	18	41	44	−3	44.74
Copa del Rey	31 October 2001	5 December 2001	Round of 64	Round of 32	2	1	0	1	2	3	−1	50.00
Total					40	18	3	19	43	47	−4	45.00

Source: Competitions

=== La Liga ===
==== League table ====
Pos	Team	Pld	W	D	L	GF	GA	GD	Pts	Qualification or relegation
5	Celta Vigo	38	16	12	10	64	46	+18	60	Qualification for the UEFA Cup first round
6	Real Betis	38	15	14	9	42	34	+8	59	Qualification for the UEFA Cup first round
7	Alavés (Note: Since Deportivo and Real Madrid, finalists of 2001–02 Copa del Rey, were qualified for the 2002–03 UEFA Champions League, Alavés entered UEFA Cup as best qualified in no european places (7th placed))	38	17	3	18	41	44	−3	54	Qualification for the UEFA Cup first round
8	Sevilla	38	14	11	13	51	40	+11	53 (Note: SEV: 7 pts → SEV 3–3 ATH; ATH: 7 pts → ATH 0–1 SEV; MLG: 3 pts)	
9	Athletic Bilbao	38	14	11	13	54	66	−12	53	

Source: LFP
Rules for classification: 1st points; 2nd head-to-head points; 3rd head-to-head goal difference; 4th head-to-head goals scored; 5th goal difference; 6th number of goals scored; 7th Fair-play points

==== Results summary ====
Overall								Home						Away					
Pld	W	D	L	GF	GA	GD	Pts	W	D	L	GF	GA	GD	W	D	L	GF	GA	GD
38	17	3	18	41	44	−3	54	10	1	8	22	21	+1	7	2	10	19	23	−4

==== Results by round ====
Round	1	2	3	4	5	6	7	8	9	10	11	12	13	14	15	16	17	18	19	20	21	22	23	24	25	26	27	28	29	30	31	32	33	34	35	36	37	38
Ground	A	H	A	H	A	H	A	H	A	H	A	H	H	A	H	A	H	A	H	H	A	H	A	H	A	H	A	H	A	H	A	A	H	A	H	A	H	A
Result	W	W	D	L	D	W	L	D	W	W	L	W	W	L	W	W	L	L	L	W	W	L	W	L	L	L	L	W	L	L	W	L	W	L	W	L	L	W
Position	5	4	2	7	8	6	7	7	6	4	5	4	2	2	1	1	3	6	8	6	2	5	4	6	7	8	8	8	8	8	8	9	8	9	7	7	7	7

A = Away; H = Home; W = Win; D = Draw; L = Loss

==== Matches ====
26 August 2001 1	Tenerife	0–2	Alavés	Santa Cruz de Tenerife
19:00 CEST (UTC+2)			Navarro 40'; Astudillo 83'	Stadium: Heliodoro Rodríguez López; Attendance: 15,000

2 September 2001 2	Alavés	2–0	Real Sociedad	Vitoria-Gasteiz
18:00 CEST (UTC+2)	Magno 31'; Llorens 79'			Stadium: Mendizorrotza; Attendance: 14,800

15 September 2001 3	Mallorca	0–0	Alavés	Palma
20:30 CEST (UTC+2)				Stadium: Son Moix

22 September 2001 4	Alavés	2–3	Deportivo La Coruña	Vitoria-Gasteiz
21:30 CEST (UTC+2)				Stadium: Mendizorrotza

30 September 2001 5	Valencia	0–0	Alavés	Valencia
19:00 CEST (UTC+2)				Stadium: Mestalla

7 October 2001 6	Alavés	1–0	Málaga	Vitoria-Gasteiz
20:30 CEST (UTC+2)				Stadium: Mendizorrotza

20 October 2001 7	Real Betis	1–0	Alavés	Seville
18:00 CEST (UTC+2)				Stadium: Manuel Ruiz de Lopera

27 October 2001 8	Alavés	0–0	Real Madrid	Vitoria-Gasteiz
21:30 CEST (UTC+2)				Stadium: Mendizorrotza

3 November 2001 9	Valladolid	1–3	Alavés	Valladolid
18:00 CEST (UTC+2)				Stadium: José Zorrilla

11 November 2001 10	Alavés	1–0	Las Palmas	Vitoria-Gasteiz
17:00 CET (UTC+1)				Stadium: Mendizorrotza

14 November 2001 11	Athletic Bilbao	2–1	Alavés	Bilbao
21:30 CET (UTC+1)				Stadium: San Mamés

18 November 2001 12	Alavés	2–1	Espanyol	Vitoria-Gasteiz
17:00 CET (UTC+1)				Stadium: Mendizorrotza

21 November 2001 13	Alavés	1–0	Celta Vigo	Vitoria-Gasteiz
17:00 CET (UTC+1)				Stadium: Mendizorrotza

25 November 2001 14	Villarreal	1–0	Alavés	Villarreal
17:00 CET (UTC+1)				Stadium: El Madrigal

1 December 2001 15	Alavés	2–0	Barcelona	Vitoria-Gasteiz
21:30 CET (UTC+1)				Stadium: Mendizorrotza

9 December 2001 16	Zaragoza	0–2	Alavés	Zaragoza
17:00 CET (UTC+1)				Stadium: La Romareda

15 December 2001 17	Alavés	0–1	Sevilla	Vitoria-Gasteiz
18:00 CET (UTC+1)				Stadium: Mendizorrotza

23 December 2001 19	Alavés	0–2	Osasuna	Vitoria-Gasteiz
17:00 CET (UTC+1)				Stadium: Mendizorrotza

13 January 2002 20	Alavés	1–0	Tenerife	Vitoria-Gasteiz
17:00 CET (UTC+1)				Stadium: Mendizorrotza

19 January 2002 21	Real Sociedad	1–2	Alavés	San Sebastián
17:00 CET (UTC+1)				Stadium: Anoeta

23 January 2002 18	Rayo Vallecano	2–0	Alavés	Madrid
21:00 CET (UTC+1)				Stadium: Campo de Fútbol de Vallecas

27 January 2002 22	Alavés	0–4	Mallorca	Vitoria-Gasteiz
17:00 CET (UTC+1)				Stadium: Mendizorrotza

2 February 2002 23	Deportivo La Coruña	0–1	Alavés	A Coruña
20:45 CET (UTC+1)				Stadium: Riazor

6 February 2002 24	Alavés	1–2	Valencia	Vitoria-Gasteiz
20:30 CET (UTC+1)				Stadium: Mendizorrotza

10 February 2002 25	Málaga	1–0	Alavés	Málaga
17:00 CET (UTC+1)				Stadium: La Rosaleda

17 February 2002 26	Alavés	0–1	Real Betis	Vitoria-Gasteiz
17:00 CET (UTC+1)				Stadium: Mendizorrotza

23 February 2002 27	Real Madrid	3–1	Alavés	Madrid
20:00 CET (UTC+1)				Stadium: Santiago Bernabéu

3 March 2002 28	Alavés	3–1	Valladolid	Vitoria-Gasteiz
17:00 CET (UTC+1)				Stadium: Mendizorrotza

9 March 2002 29	Las Palmas	2–1	Alavés	Las Palmas
22:00 CET (UTC+1)				Stadium: Insular

17 March 2002 30	Alavés	2–3	Athletic Bilbao	Vitoria-Gasteiz
17:00 CET (UTC+1)				Stadium: Mendizorrotza

24 March 2002 31	Espanyol	1–2	Alavés	Barcelona
17:00 CET (UTC+1)				Stadium: Estadi Olímpic Lluís Companys

30 March 2002 32	Celta Vigo	3–1	Alavés	Vigo
21:00 CEST (UTC+2)				Stadium: Estadio Balaídos

7 April 2002 33	Alavés	2–1	Villarreal	Vitoria-Gasteiz
18:00 CEST (UTC+2)				Stadium: Mendizorrotza

14 April 2002 34	Barcelona	3–2	Alavés	Barcelona
18:30 CEST (UTC+2)				Stadium: Camp Nou

21 April 2002 35	Alavés	2–1	Zaragoza	Vitoria-Gasteiz
18:00 CEST (UTC+2)				Stadium: Mendizorrotza

28 April 2002 36	Sevilla	2–0	Alavés	Seville
18:00 CEST (UTC+2)				Stadium: Ramón Sánchez Pizjuán

5 May 2002 37	Alavés	0–1	Rayo Vallecano	Vitoria-Gasteiz
20:00 CEST (UTC+2)				Stadium: Mendizorrotza

11 May 2002 38	Osasuna	0–1	Alavés	Pamplona
21:00 CEST (UTC+2)				Stadium: El Sadar

=== Copa del Rey ===
31 October 2001 Round of 64	Compostela	1–2	Alavés	Compostela
21:00 CET (UTC+1)				Stadium: Vero Boquete de San Lázaro

5 December 2001 Round of 32	Sporting Gijón	2–0	Alavés	Gijón
21:00 CET (UTC+1)				Stadium: El Molinón
