= Camp d'Esports (Lleida) =

Neighborhood in Lleida, Catalonia, Spain

Coordinates: 41°37′13″N 0°36′48″E

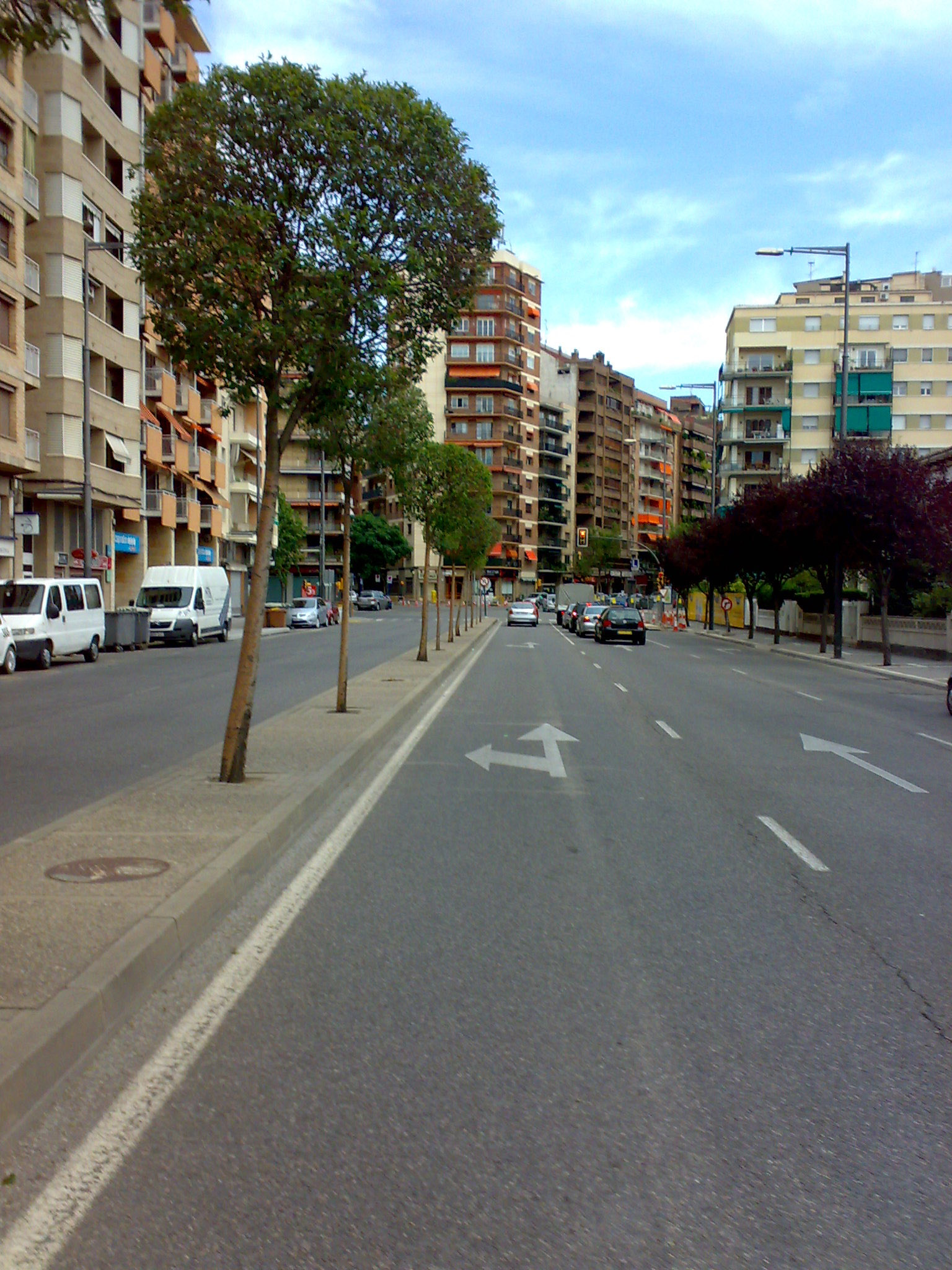
Rovira Roure avenue

Camp d'Esports is a neighborhood in Lleida, Catalonia, Spain. As of 2009, it had 4,850 inhabitants. It is named after the Camp d'Esports football stadium located in the area and it is bordered (clockwise starting from the northeast) by the neighborhoods of Príncep de Viana-Clot, Xalets-Humbert Torres, Universitat, Joc de la Bola and Ciutat Jardí-Les Valls.

== See also ==
- Neighborhoods of Lleida
