= 2003–04 Deportivo Alavés season =

Deportivo Alavés
2003–04 season
- President: Dmitry Piterman
- Head coach: Pepe Mel
- Segunda División: 4th
- Copa del Rey: Semi-finals
- Top goalscorer: League: Rubén Navarro (10); All: Rubén Navarro (14)

The 2003–04 season was the 82nd season in the existence of Deportivo Alavés and the club's first season back in the second division of Spanish football. In addition to the domestic league, Alavés participated in this season's edition of the Copa del Rey. The season covered the period from 1 July 2003 to 30 June 2004.

== Competitions ==
=== Overview ===
Competition	First match	Last match	Starting round	Final position	Record							
Competition	First match	Last match	Starting round	Final position	Pld	W	D	L	GF	GA	GD	Win %
Segunda División	31 August 2003	19 June 2004	Matchday 1	4th	42	20	14	8	48	32	+16	47.62
Copa del Rey	8 October 2003	12 February 2004	Round of 64	Semi-finals	8	2	5	1	9	7	+2	25.00
Total					50	22	19	9	57	39	+18	44.00

Source: Competitions

=== Segunda División ===
==== League table ====
Pos	Team	Pld	W	D	L	GF	GA	GD	Pts	Promotion or relegation
2	Getafe (P)	42	20	16	6	55	38	+17	76 (Note: NUM 0-0 GET; GET 2-1 NUM)	Promotion to La Liga
3	Numancia (P)	42	22	10	10	60	30	+30	76	Promotion to La Liga
4	Alavés	42	20	14	8	48	32	+16	74	
5	Sporting Gijón	42	20	10	12	58	40	+18	70	
6	Recreativo	42	14	20	8	45	34	+11	62	

Source: LFP - Liga Adelante
Rules for classification: 1st points; 2nd head-to-head points; 3rd head-to-head goal difference; 4th head-to-head goals scored; 5th goal difference; 6th number of goals scored; 7th Fair-play points
(P) Promoted

==== Results summary ====
Overall								Home						Away					
Pld	W	D	L	GF	GA	GD	Pts	W	D	L	GF	GA	GD	W	D	L	GF	GA	GD
42	20	14	8	48	32	+16	74	12	7	2	27	12	+15	8	7	6	21	20	+1

==== Results by round ====
Round	1	2	3	4	5	6	7	8	9	10	11	12	13	14	15	16	17	18	19	20	21	22	23	24	25	26	27	28	29	30	31	32	33	34	35	36	37	38	39	40	41	42
Ground	A	H	A	H	A	H	H	A	H	A	H	A	H	A	H	A	H	A	H	A	H	H	A	H	A	H	A	A	H	A	H	A	H	A	H	A	H	A	H	A	H	A
Result	L	W	L	W	D	W	D	D	W	L	W	D	D	W	L	W	W	D	D	W	L	D	L	W	L	W	D	W	D	D	W	W	W	W	D	D	W	W	D	L	W	W
Position	19	10	15	9	9	5	6	6	5	6	5	7	6	6	8	5	4	5	4	4	6	5	6	4	5	4	4	4	4	5	5	4	4	3	3	3	3	3	2	4	4	4

A = Away; H = Home; W = Win; D = Draw; L = Loss

==== Matches ====
31 August 2003 1	Tenerife	1–0	Alavés	Santa Cruz de Tenerife
14:00 CEST (UTC+2)				Stadium: Estadio Heliodoro Rodríguez López

7 September 2003 2	Alavés	2–1	Sporting Gijón	Vitoria-Gasteiz
14:00 CEST (UTC+2)				Stadium: Mendizorrotza

14 September 2003 3	Almería	2–1	Alavés	Almería
14:00 CEST (UTC+2)				Stadium: Estadio Municipal Juan Rojas

21 September 2003 4	Alavés	1–0	Málaga B	Vitoria-Gasteiz
14:00 CEST (UTC+2)				Stadium: Mendizorrotza

27 September 2003 5	Getafe	0–0	Alavés	Getafe
14:00 CEST (UTC+2)				Stadium: Coliseum Alfonso Pérez

4 October 2003 6	Alavés	2–0	Cádiz	Vitoria-Gasteiz
14:00 CEST (UTC+2)				Stadium: Mendizorrotza

12 October 2003 7	Alavés	1–1	Algeciras	Vitoria-Gasteiz
14:00 CEST (UTC+2)				Stadium: Mendizorrotza

19 October 2003 8	Recreativo	0–0	Alavés	Huelva
14:00 CEST (UTC+2)				Stadium: Nuevo Colombino

26 October 2003 9	Alavés	1–0	Córdoba	Vitoria-Gasteiz
14:00 CEST (UTC+2)				Stadium: Mendizorrotza

2 November 2003 10	Salamanca	3–1	Alavés	Villares de la Reina
14:00 CEST (UTC+2)				Stadium: Helmántico Stadium

8 November 2003 11	Alavés	1–0	Las Palmas	Vitoria-Gasteiz
14:00 CEST (UTC+2)				Stadium: Mendizorrotza

15 November 2003 12	Levante	0–0	Alavés	Valencia
14:00 CEST (UTC+2)				Stadium: Ciutat de València

23 November 2003 13	Alavés	1–1	Xerez	Vitoria-Gasteiz
14:00 CEST (UTC+2)				Stadium: Mendizorrotza

30 November 2003 14	Poli Ejido	1–3	Alavés	El Ejido
14:00 CEST (UTC+2)				Stadium: Estadio Municipal Santo Domingo

6 December 2003 15	Alavés	0–1	Terrassa	Vitoria-Gasteiz
14:00 CEST (UTC+2)				Stadium: Mendizorrotza

13 December 2003 16	Rayo Vallecano	1–2	Alavés	Madrid
14:00 CEST (UTC+2)				Stadium: Estadio Teresa Rivero

21 December 2003 17	Alavés	2–1	Elche	Vitoria-Gasteiz
14:00 CEST (UTC+2)				Stadium: Mendizorrotza

4 January 2004 18	Leganés	0–0	Alavés	Leganés
14:00 CEST (UTC+2)				Stadium: Estadio Municipal de Butarque

11 January 2004 19	Alavés	1–1	Numancia	Vitoria-Gasteiz
14:00 CEST (UTC+2)				Stadium: Mendizorrotza

18 January 2004 20	Ciudad de Murcia	0–1	Alavés	Murcia
14:00 CEST (UTC+2)				Stadium: Estadio de La Condomina

25 January 2004 21	Alavés	0–2	Eibar	Vitoria-Gasteiz
14:00 CEST (UTC+2)				Stadium: Mendizorrotza

31 January 2004 22	Alavés	0–0	Tenerife	Vitoria-Gasteiz
14:00 CEST (UTC+2)				Stadium: Mendizorrotza

8 February 2004 23	Sporting Gijón	2–0	Alavés	Gijón
14:00 CEST (UTC+2)				Stadium: El Molinón

15 February 2004 24	Alavés	2–0	Almería	Vitoria-Gasteiz
14:00 CEST (UTC+2)				Stadium: Mendizorrotza

21 February 2004 25	Málaga B	2–1	Alavés	Málaga
14:00 CEST (UTC+2)				Stadium: Estadio La Rosaleda

7 March 2004 27	Cádiz	1–1	Alavés	Cádiz
14:00 CEST (UTC+2)				Stadium: Estadio Ramón de Carranza

13 March 2004 28	Algeciras	1–2	Alavés	Algeciras
14:00 CEST (UTC+2)				Stadium: Estadio Nuevo Mirador

21 March 2004 29	Alavés	1–1	Recreativo	Vitoria-Gasteiz
14:00 CEST (UTC+2)				Stadium: Mendizorrotza

24 March 2004 26	Alavés	3–0	Getafe	Vitoria-Gasteiz
14:00 CEST (UTC+2)				Stadium: Mendizorrotza

28 March 2004 30	Córdoba	0–0	Alavés	Córdoba
14:00 CEST (UTC+2)				Stadium: Nuevo Arcángel

4 April 2004 31	Alavés	1–0	Salamanca	Vitoria-Gasteiz
14:00 CEST (UTC+2)				Stadium: Mendizorrotza

11 April 2004 32	Las Palmas	1–2	Alavés	Las Palmas
14:00 CEST (UTC+2)				Stadium: Estadio Gran Canaria

18 April 2004 33	Alavés	3–2	Levante	Vitoria-Gasteiz
14:00 CEST (UTC+2)				Stadium: Mendizorrotza

25 April 2004 34	Xerez	1–2	Alavés	Jerez de la Frontera
14:00 CEST (UTC+2)				Stadium: Chapín

1 May 2004 35	Alavés	0–0	Poli Ejido	Vitoria-Gasteiz
14:00 CEST (UTC+2)				Stadium: Mendizorrotza

8 May 2004 36	Terrassa	0–0	Alavés	Terrassa
14:00 CEST (UTC+2)				Stadium: Estadi Olímpic de Terrassa

16 May 2004 37	Alavés	3–0	Rayo Vallecano	Vitoria-Gasteiz
14:00 CEST (UTC+2)				Stadium: Mendizorrotza

22 May 2004 38	Elche	0–2	Alavés	Elche
14:00 CEST (UTC+2)				Stadium: Martínez Valero

29 May 2004 39	Alavés	1–1	Leganés	Vitoria-Gasteiz
14:00 CEST (UTC+2)				Stadium: Mendizorrotza

6 June 2004 40	Numancia	3–1	Alavés	Soria
14:00 CEST (UTC+2)				Stadium: Los Pajaritos

13 June 2004 41	Alavés	1–0	Ciudad de Murcia	Vitoria-Gasteiz
14:00 CEST (UTC+2)				Stadium: Mendizorrotza

19 June 2004 42	Eibar	1–2	Alavés	Eibar
14:00 CEST (UTC+2)				Stadium: Ipurua

=== Copa del Rey ===
8 October 2003 Round of 64	Racing Ferrol	1–1	Alavés	Ferrol
CEST (UTC+2)

16 December 2003 Round of 32	Alavés	2–1	Real Sociedad	Vitoria-Gasteiz
CEST (UTC+2)				Stadium: Mendizorrotza

7 January 2004 Round of 16; First leg	Alavés	0–0	Valladolid	Vitoria-Gasteiz
CEST (UTC+2)				Stadium: Mendizorrotza

14 January 2004 Round of 16; Second leg	Valladolid	1–1 (1 (a)–1 agg.)	Alavés	Valladolid
CEST (UTC+2)

22 January 2004 Quarter-finals; First leg	Alavés	4–2	Celta Vigo	Vitoria-Gasteiz
CEST (UTC+2)				Stadium: Mendizorrotza

28 January 2004 Quarter-finals; Second leg	Celta Vigo	1–0 (3–4 agg.)	Alavés	Vigo
CEST (UTC+2)				Stadium: Balaídos

5 February 2004 Semi-finals; First leg	Alavés	1–1	Zaragoza	Vitoria-Gasteiz
CEST (UTC+2)				Stadium: Mendizorrotza

12 February 2004 Semi-finals; Second leg	Zaragoza	0–0 (1 (a)–1 agg.)	Alavés	Zaragoza
CEST (UTC+2)				Stadium: La Romareda
