= Hermes Desio =

Argentine footballer (born 1970)

Personal information
- Full name: Hermes Aldo Desio
- Date of birth: 20 January 1970 (age 56)
- Place of birth: Rosario, Argentina
- Position: Defensive midfielder

Youth career
- Sporting Club
- Estudiantes
- Renato Cesarini

Senior career*
Years	Team	Apps	(Gls)
1988–1989	Renato Cesarini		
1989–1994	Independiente	111	(3)
1994–1996	Celta	63	(0)
1996–1997	Salamanca	19	(0)
1997–2003	Alavés	164	(6)

Managerial career
- 2021–2022: UNAM (Assistant)
- * Club domestic league appearances and goals

Hermes Aldo Desio (born 20 January 1970) is an Argentine former professional footballer who played for Independiente, Celta de Vigo, UD Salamanca and Deportivo Alavés, as a defensive midfielder.

== Career ==
Raised in the town of Corral de Bustos in Córdoba Province, Argentina, Desio began his career in his native country playing for Club Renato Cesarini and Independiente, winning the 1993–94 Clausura with the latter. He had departed by the time they claimed the 1994 Supercopa Sudamericana, having transferred (initially on loan) to play for Celta de Vigo of Spain's La Liga, whose manager at the time, Carlos Aimar, hailed from the same town.

Desio's spell in Galicia outlasted that of Aimar, but in December 1996 he moved to second-tier UD Salamanca where he played only until the end of that season; the team finished as runners-up and were promoted, but Desio would remain at the same level, joining Deportivo Alavés. Earning respect for his combative approach and ball-winning abilities, he immediately helped the Basque club achieve their own promotion as winners of the 1997–98 Segunda División, and alongside a new arrival with a similar style, compatriot Martín Astudillo, played regularly as the side coached by Mané narrowly maintained their status in the top division, qualified for the UEFA Cup and then reached the final of the European competition in successive years – Desio made 12 appearances in the continental run, which included the elimination of Inter Milan, and played the entirety of the 2001 UEFA Cup Final which Alavés lost 5–4 to Liverpool.

Having missed only 10 league matches in the previous four years, he was absent for almost all of the following campaign with a serious injury to his right knee sustained in a pre-season match in England, and though he made a successful return to the squad in 2002–03, his involvement was interrupted by two red cards. He retired at the end of that season, aged 33, as the team were relegated. With his spell in Europe lasting nine years, he also acquired Spanish nationality.

After retiring as a player, in 2009 Desio became co-ordinator of youth football with his hometown team, Sporting Club de Corral de Bustos, moving on to a similar role at professional club Estudiantes de La Plata in 2013 (working under sporting director and subsequent president, Juan Sebastián Verón), and in 2017 taking up a post overseeing the underage national squads for the Argentine Football Association, also in collaboration with Verón.

In May 2021 he became an assistant at UNAM.

== Personal life ==
Desio has two brothers who are also involved in football: Jorge is a fitness coach who has assisted Jorge Sampaoli at numerous managerial roles including the Chilean and Argentine national squads; Carlos is a former player and a coach whose appointments include the national under-17 squad working with Pablo Aimar.

His son Gonzalo (born in Vitoria-Gasteiz, Spain) is also a footballer, trained in the ranks of Estudiantes and involved with Argentina's national youth squads, appearing at the 2018 South American Games.
