= Cruijffiaans =

Collection of sayings by Johan Cruijff

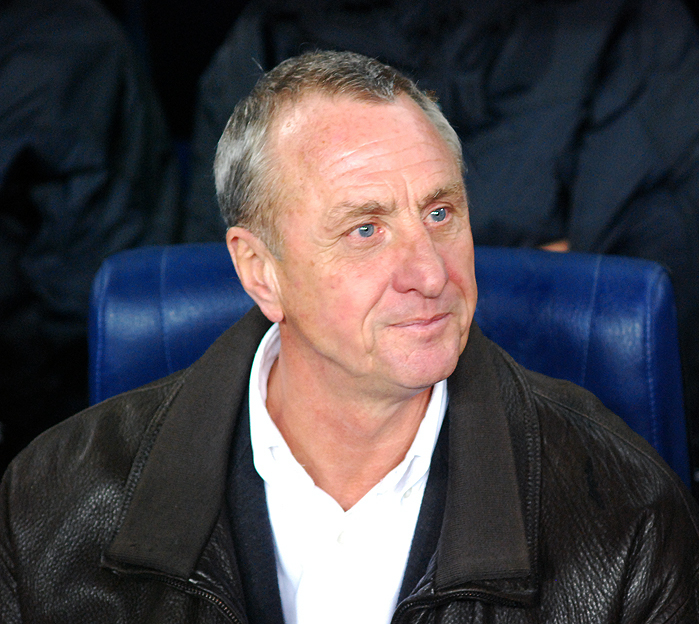
Cruijff at Camp Nou, 2009

Cruijffiaans is the way of speaking, or a collection of sayings, made famous by Dutch association football player and coach Johan Cruyff (1947–2016), particularly "one-liners that hover somewhere between the brilliant and the banal". An example is "Je moet altijd zorgen dat je één doelpunt meer scoort als de tegenstander" (You always have to make sure that you score one goal more than your opponent).

== Description ==
Je gaat het pas zien als je het doorhebt.
("You'll only see it when you understand it.")

Cruijff grew up in a working-class environment in Amsterdam, where he developed his gogme, an Amsterdam-Yiddish word for streetwise. After staying back twice, he left his secondary education at Frankendael High School without a diploma. Cruijff's Amsterdam vernacular was not the generally accepted variation of the Dutch language (Algemeen Beschaafd Nederlands or ABN), according to linguist Jan Stroop. Lexically, Cruijffiaans is noted for its syncretism of highly diverse linguistic registers, and combines a working class Amsterdam dialect and football lingo with words not frequently found in the language of football. Semantically, Cruijffiaans contains many tautologies and paradoxes that, while appearing mundane or self-evident, suggest a deeper level of meaning, a mysterious layer not normally attainable for the average speaker or listener. Syntactically, it uses the rules of Dutch grammar selectively and freely reorganizes word order. Other quirks, for instance, are that Cruijffiaans knows only one relative pronoun, wie.

Cruijff's aphorisms, neologisms, and bastardizations have proven influential, having been the subject of some ridicule, praise, and linguistic investigation. His pronouncements oscillate between pithy aphorism and "endless monologue"; Kees Fens said Cruijffiaans was an essayistic style that compares to stream of consciousness prose.

== Quotes ==
Dutch	English	Source
Als ik zou willen dat je het begreep, had ik het wel beter uitgelegd.	If I wanted you to understand it, I would have explained it better.	
Elk nadeel heb z'n voordeel.	Every disadvantage has its advantage.	
In zekere zin ben ik waarschijnlijk onsterfelijk.	In a certain way I'm probably immortal.	
Italianen kunnen nooit van je winnen, maar je kunt wel van ze verliezen.	Italians can never beat you, but you can lose to them.	
Je gaat het pas zien als je het doorhebt.	You're gonna get it, once you've got it.	
Als je de bal hebt, hoef je niet te verdedigen, want er is maar één bal.	When you play for possession, you don't have to defend, because there's only one ball.	

== Legacy ==
A poll in 2007 by Amsterdam newspaper Het Parool asking readers about their favorite Cruijff saying found that it was Elk nadeel heb zijn voordeel ("Every disadvantage has its advantage"--heb being the Amsterdam pronunciation of heeft). Linguist Jan Stroop noted that writer Renate Rubinstein had used that expression before Cruijff did, but thinks it is unlikely that Cruijff had gotten it from her.

The second favorite saying was Als ik zou willen dat je het begreep, legde ik het wel beter uit ("If I wanted you to understand it, I would have explained it better"). While Stroop said Cruijffiaans frequently was more murky than enlightening and that Cruijff's language was accepted because it was his, journalist and television presenter Hanneke Groenteman said it was hypnotic.

The Johan Cruyff Foundation, which promotes sports activity especially for disabled children, sells Delftware tiles with some of his expressions. In 2014, the organization published a daily calendar.

== See also ==
- Bushism
- Putinisms
- "Yogi-isms"
- Tomlinisms
