= Edu Alonso =

Spanish footballer (born 1974)

Personal information
- Full name: Eduardo Alonso Álvarez
- Date of birth: 30 May 1974 (age 52)
- Place of birth: Bilbao, Spain
- Height: 1.77 m (5 ft 10 in)
- Position: Midfielder

Youth career
- Athletic Bilbao

Senior career*
Years	Team	Apps	(Gls)
1992–1996	Bilbao Athletic	113	(5)
1996–2000	Athletic Bilbao	31	(0)
1996	→ Eibar (loan)	5	(0)
1997–1999	→ Salamanca (loan)	63	(4)
2000–2002	Las Palmas	63	(0)
2002–2008	Alavés	165	(7)
Total		440	(16)

International career
1993	Spain U21	2	(0)
2002–2006	Basque Country	2	(0)
- * Club domestic league appearances and goals

Eduardo 'Edu' Alonso Álvarez (born 30 May 1974) is a Spanish former professional footballer who played as a right midfielder.

He spent the better part of his career with Alavés after starting out at Athletic Bilbao, playing 180 competitive matches for the former club. Overall, he made more than 200 appearances in both La Liga and the Segunda División.

== Club career ==
Born in Bilbao, Basque Country, Alonso was brought up at Athletic Bilbao. He spent four full seasons in the Segunda División with their B team, making his debut at the age of 18 in a 4–0 home win against SD Eibar where he came on as a second-half substitute.

Alonso was loaned to precisely Eibar for the 1996–97 campaign, being recalled by his parent club shortly after. He first appeared in La Liga on 17 November 1996, starting in a 4–2 away victory over Sporting de Gijón.

After two years at UD Salamanca also in the top tier – where he notably scored a goal for the hosts in a 2–1 home defeat of Athletic and another in a 1–1 draw with FC Barcelona at the Camp Nou the previous weekend– Alonso returned to San Mamés. He played 26 games in all competitions during the season, under manager Luis Fernández.

Following his release, Alonso represented fellow top-flight sides UD Las Palmas and Deportivo Alavés, signing for the latter as a free agent after leaving the Canary Islands due to unpaid wages. He made his debut in the UEFA Cup on 31 October 2002 in a 1–1 home draw against Beşiktaş J.K. in the second round, going on to be relegated twice during his spell.

In September 2008, after recurring injury problems, the 34-year-old Alonso parted ways with Alavés by mutual consent and announced his retirement.

== International career ==
Alonso earned two caps for the Spain under-21s. Additionally, he represented the Basque Country regional team.
