= Nacho Fernández (footballer, born 1990) =

Spanish footballer (born 1990)

Personal information
- Full name: Ignacio Fernández Rodríguez
- Date of birth: 12 February 1990 (age 36)
- Place of birth: Oviedo, Spain
- Height: 1.82 m (6 ft 0 in)
- Position: Midfielder

Youth career
- Oviedo

Senior career*
Years	Team	Apps	(Gls)
1999–2000	Oviedo B	25	(0)
2000–2001	Siero	31	(0)
2001–2004	Alavés B	63	(2)
2003–2005	Alavés	31	(0)
2005–2006	Racing Ferrol	37	(1)
2006–2010	Ponferradina	123	(2)
2010–2012	Logroñés	68	(1)
2012–2015	Caudal	86	(5)
2015–2016	Avilés	34	(1)
2016–2018	Covadonga	?	(2)
Total		488	(14)
- * Club domestic league appearances and goals

Ignacio "Nacho" Fernández Rodríguez (born 12 February 1990) is a Spanish former professional footballer who played as a midfielder.
