= Ángel Luis =

Spanish footballer and manager

Personal information
- Full name: Ángel Luis Fernández Serrano
- Date of birth: 26 February 1970 (age 56)
- Place of birth: Puertollano, Spain
- Height: 1.84 m (6 ft 1/2 in)
- Position: Midfielder

Youth career
- Calvo Sotelo

Senior career*
Years	Team	Apps	(Gls)
1987–1991	Hospitalet	92	(4)
1991–1994	Español	65	(0)
1994–1995	Mallorca	36	(7)
1995–1996	CP Mérida	27	(1)
1996–1997	Lleida	21	(1)
1997–1999	Villarreal	36	(1)
1999–2000	Logroñés	10	(0)
2000–2001	Mérida UD		
2001–2003	Hospitalet	44	(0)
2003	Vilanova	6	(0)
2003–2004	Sant Andreu	17	(1)
Total		354	(15)

International career
1991	Spain U23	3	(0)

Managerial career
- 2004–2005: Mérida UD (assistant)
- 2011–2012: Puertollano B
- * Club domestic league appearances and goals

Ángel Luis Fernández Serrano (born 26 February 1970 in Puertollano, Castile-La Mancha), known as Ángel Luis, is a Spanish retired footballer who played as a midfielder.
