= 2004–05 Deportivo Alavés season =

Deportivo Alavés
2004–05 season
- President: Dmitry Piterman
- Head coach: Chuchi Cos
- Stadium: Mendizorrotza
- Segunda División: 3rd (promoted)
- Copa del Rey: Round of 64
- Top goalscorer: League: Rodolfo Bodipo (16); All: Rodolfo Bodipo (16)

The 2004–05 season was the 84th season in the existence of Deportivo Alavés and the club's second consecutive season in the Segunda División.

== Competitions ==
=== Overall record ===
Competition	First match	Last match	Starting round	Final position	Record							
Competition	First match	Last match	Starting round	Final position	Pld	W	D	L	GF	GA	GD	Win %
Segunda División	29 August 2004	18 June 2005	Matchday 1	3rd	42	23	7	12	62	47	+15	54.76
Copa del Rey	27 October 2004		Round of 64	Round of 64	1	0	1	0	1	1	+0	0.00
Total					43	23	8	12	63	48	+15	53.49

Source: BDFutbol

=== Segunda División ===
==== League table ====
Pos	Team	Pld	W	D	L	GF	GA	GD	Pts	Promotion or relegation
1	Cádiz (C, P)	42	21	13	8	68	30	+38	76 (Note: CÁD: 9 pts; CEL: 4 pts → CEL 2-2 ALA; ALA: 4 pts → ALA 0-3 CEL)	Promotion to La Liga
2	Celta de Vigo (P)	42	22	10	10	55	38	+17	76	Promotion to La Liga
3	Alavés (P)	42	23	7	12	62	47	+15	76	Promotion to La Liga
4	Eibar	42	20	13	9	53	39	+14	73	
5	Recreativo	42	19	14	9	48	32	+16	71	

Source: LFP – Liga Adelante
Rules for classification: 1st points; 2nd head-to-head points; 3rd head-to-head goal difference; 4th head-to-head goals scored; 5th goal difference; 6th number of goals scored; 7th Fair-play points
(C) Champions; (P) Promoted

==== Results summary ====
Overall								Home						Away					
Pld	W	D	L	GF	GA	GD	Pts	W	D	L	GF	GA	GD	W	D	L	GF	GA	GD
0	0	0	0	0	0	0	0	0	0	0	0	0	0	0	0	0	0	0	0

==== Results by round ====
Round	1	2	3	4	5	6	7	8	9	10	11	12	13	14	15	16	17	18	19	20	21	22	23	24	25	26	27	28	29	30
Ground	H	A	H	A	H	A	H	A	H	A	H	A	H	A	H	A	H	A	H	H	A	A	H	A	H	A	H	A	H	A
Result	L	D	W	W	D	D	W	L	W	W	W	D	L	D	W	W	W	W	D	W	W	L	L	L	L	L	L	W	W	W
Position	20	19	14	5	6	9	5	8	5	4	3	2	4	5	3	3	2	2	2	2	1	1	2	4	6	7	8	6	6	4

A = Away; H = Home; W = Win; D = Draw; L = Loss

==== Matches ====
29 August 2004 1	Alavés	2–4	Valladolid	Vitoria-Gasteiz
				Stadium: Mendizorrotza Stadium

5 September 2004 2	Recreativo	0–0	Alavés	Huelva

11 September 2004 3	Alavés	1–0	Tenerife	Vitoria-Gasteiz
				Stadium: Mendizorrotza Stadium

19 September 2004 4	Murcia	1–5	Alavés	Murcia

25 September 2004 5	Alavés	1–1	Ciudad de Murcia	Vitoria-Gasteiz
				Stadium: Mendizorrotza Stadium

2 October 2004 6	Celta Vigo	2–2	Alavés	Vigo

10 October 2004 7	Alavés	3–2	Pontevedra	Vitoria-Gasteiz
				Stadium: Mendizorrotza Stadium

17 October 2004 8	Racing Ferrol	2–1	Alavés	Ferrol

24 October 2004 9	Alavés	4–1	Terrassa	Vitoria-Gasteiz
				Stadium: Mendizorrotza Stadium

30 October 2004 10	Cádiz	0–1	Alavés	Cádiz

6 November 2004 11	Alavés	2–0	Xerez	Vitoria-Gasteiz
				Stadium: Mendizorrotza Stadium

14 November 2004 12	Málaga B	1–1	Alavés	Málaga

21 November 2004 13	Alavés	0–2	Eibar	Vitoria-Gasteiz
				Stadium: Mendizorrotza Stadium

28 November 2004 14	Salamanca	3–3	Alavés	Salamanca

4 December 2004 15	Alavés	2–0	Lleida	Vitoria-Gasteiz
				Stadium: Mendizorrotza Stadium

12 December 2004 16	Polideportivo Ejido	0–1	Alavés	El Ejido

19 December 2004 17	Alavés	2–1	Almería	Vitoria-Gasteiz
				Stadium: Mendizorrotza Stadium

22 December 2004 18	Córdoba	1–2	Alavés	Córdoba

9 January 2005 19	Alavés	1–1	Gimnàstic de Tarragona	Vitoria-Gasteiz
				Stadium: Mendizorrotza Stadium

16 January 2005 20	Alavés	1–0	Elche	Vitoria-Gasteiz
				Stadium: Mendizorrotza Stadium

23 January 2005 21	Sporting Gijón	1–2	Alavés	Gijón

30 January 2005 22	Valladolid	1–0	Alavés	Valladolid

6 February 2005 23	Alavés	0–2	Recreativo	Vitoria-Gasteiz
				Stadium: Mendizorrotza Stadium

12 February 2005 24	Tenerife	1–0	Alavés	Santa Cruz de Tenerife

20 February 2005 25	Alavés	2–3	Murcia	Vitoria-Gasteiz
				Stadium: Mendizorrotza Stadium

27 February 2005 26	Ciudad de Murcia	2–0	Alavés	Murcia

6 March 2005 27	Alavés	0–3	Celta Vigo	Vitoria-Gasteiz
				Stadium: Mendizorrotza Stadium

13 March 2005 28	Pontevedra	1–3	Alavés	Pontevedra

19 March 2005 29	Alavés	2–1	Racing Ferrol	Vitoria-Gasteiz
				Stadium: Mendizorrotza Stadium

26 March 2005 30	Terrassa	0–2	Alavés	Terrassa

18 June 2005 42	Alavés	0–1	Sporting Gijón	Vitoria-Gasteiz
				Stadium: Mendizorrotza Stadium

=== Copa del Rey ===
27 October 2004 Round of 64	Cultural Leonesa	1–1 (3–2 p)	Alavés	León
				Stadium: Estadio Reino de León
