= Rahim Beširović =

Serbia and Montenegro footballer

Personal information
- Full name: Rahim Beširović
- Date of birth: 2 January 1971 (age 55)
- Place of birth: Novi Pazar, SR Serbia, SFR Yugoslavia
- Height: 1.83 m (6 ft 0 in)
- Position: Striker

Senior career*
Years	Team	Apps	(Gls)
1992–1994	Novi Pazar		
1994–1995	Budućnost Podgorica	22	(17)
1995–1996	Partizan	29	(11)
1996–1998	Lleida	18	(1)
1998–1999	Daewoo Royals	17	(4)
Total		86+	(33+)
- * Club domestic league appearances and goals

Rahim Beširović (Serbian Cyrillic: Рахим Бешировић; born 2 January 1971) is a Serbia and Montenegro former professional footballer who played as a striker.

== Career ==
After starting out at his hometown club Novi Pazar, Beširović moved to Budućnost Podgorica in 1994, becoming their top scorer that season with 17 goals. He was subsequently transferred to Partizan in 1995. With 11 goals, Beširović helped the Belgrade club win the 1995–96 First League of FR Yugoslavia. He later played abroad for Spanish club Lleida (1996–1998) and South Korean club Pusan Daewoo Royals (1998–1999).

== Honours ==
Partizan

- First League of FR Yugoslavia: 1995–96
