= Jesús Turiel =

Spanish footballer

Personal information
- Full name: Jesús Ángel Turiel de la Cruz
- Date of birth: 6 October 1973 (age 53)
- Place of birth: Málaga, Spain
- Height: 1.80 m (5 ft 11 in)
- Position: Defensive midfielder

Youth career
- 1987–1993: Valladolid

Senior career*
Years	Team	Apps	(Gls)
1992–1997	Valladolid B	116	(20)
1995–2001	Valladolid	82	(7)
1997–1998	→ Toledo (loan)	22	(3)
2001–2004	Alavés	84	(2)
2004–2005	Elche	24	(0)
2005–2007	Hércules	58	(3)
2007–2009	Pontevedra	62	(2)
Total		448	(37)
- * Club domestic league appearances and goals

Jesús Ángel Turiel de la Cruz (born 6 October 1973) is a Spanish former professional footballer who played as a defensive midfielder.

== Club career ==
Turiel was born in Málaga, Andalusia. During his early career, the defensive-minded player with good heading ability represented Real Valladolid (which also loaned him, in 1997–98, to CD Toledo) and Deportivo Alavés – being signed immediately after the 2001 UEFA Cup final– following which he returned to Segunda División, representing Elche CF and Hércules CF.

In the summer of 2007, Turiel joined Segunda División B club Pontevedra CF, being released after two promotionless campaigns. He appeared in 135 matches each in La Liga and the second tier in 12 professional seasons, scoring eight and seven goals respectively.
