= Julio Rodríguez (footballer, born 1968) =

Uruguayan footballer

Personal information
- Full name: Julio César Rodríguez Secco
- Date of birth: September 20, 1968 (age 58)
- Place of birth: Montevideo, Uruguay
- Height: 1.80 m (5 ft 11 in)
- Position: Midfielder

Senior career*
Years	Team	Apps	(Gls)
1987–1989	Liverpool (U)		
1990	Peñarol		
1991	Liverpool (U)		
1992–1995	Danubio		
1995–1998	UE Lleida	38	(9)
1998–1999	Numancia	22	(2)
1999	Liverpool (U)		
1999	San Martín	1	(0)
2000	Liverpool (U)		
2001	Racing Club		
2003	Cerro		

International career
1993	Uruguay	1	(0)
- * Club domestic league appearances and goals as of November 2008

Julio César Rodríguez Secco (born in Montevideo, Uruguay, on 20 September 1968) is a former Uruguayan footballer. He played for Liverpool (U) of Uruguay, San Martín of Argentina, and UE Lleida and Numancia of Spain.
