= Juan Cruz Ochoa =

Spanish footballer

Personal information
- Full name: Juan Cruz Ochoa López
- Date of birth: 4 March 1979 (age 47)
- Place of birth: Pamplona, Spain
- Height: 1.91 m (6 ft 3 in)
- Position: Centre back

Senior career*
Years	Team	Apps	(Gls)
1999–2001	Calahorra	47	(2)
2001–2002	Alavés B	26	(2)
2002–2004	Alavés	19	(0)
2004–2006	Numancia	64	(1)
2006–2010	Murcia	77	(3)
2010–2012	Huesca	26	(1)
2012–2013	Orihuela	22	(0)
2013–2015	Eupen	49	(5)
2016	Lorca Deportiva	15	(0)
Total		345	(14)
- * Club domestic league appearances and goals

Juan Cruz Ochoa López (born 4 March 1979) is a Spanish former footballer who played as a central defender.

== Football career ==
Ochoa was born in Pamplona, Navarre. After beginning professionally with CD Calahorra, he moved to Deportivo Alavés, appearing once for the latter's first team in the 2001–02 season. He could only play in a further four La Liga games during the following campaign, being mainly registered with the reserves; his debut in the top flight occurred on 25 November 2001, as he played the first half of a 0–1 away loss against Villarreal CF.

For 2004–05, Ochoa signed with CD Numancia, experiencing top-tier relegation in his first year. After a second, in which he also was heavily featured, he moved to another club in Segunda División, Real Murcia, playing 21 matches in his second season in a promotion.

Having signed with the team the previous summer, Ochoa started the 2011–12 campaign in the second level with SD Huesca, being released in the very last day of the winter transfer window. On 20 September, the 33-year-old returned to active and signed for one season with Segunda División B side Orihuela CF.
