= Zoran Čampara =

Serbian footballer (born 1972)

Zoran Čampara Зоран Чампара
Personal information
- Full name: Zoran Čampara
- Date of birth: 16 February 1972 (age 54)
- Place of birth: Mostar, SR Bosnia and Herzegovina, SFR Yugoslavia
- Height: 1.85 m (6 ft 1 in)
- Position: Defender

Senior career*
Years	Team	Apps	(Gls)
1989–1991	Iskra Bugojno	51	(1)
1992	Velež Mostar	8	(0)
1992–1995	Rad	91	(10)
1995–1997	Lleida	35	(5)
1997–2004	Royal Antwerp	132	(6)
2003	→ Shandong Luneng (loan)	5	(1)
2003	→ Beitar Jerusalem (loan)	3	(0)
2004–2006	Francs Borains		
Total		321+	(23+)

Managerial career
- 2008–2011: Rad (sporting director)
- 2011: Hajduk Kula (sporting director)
- 2011–2012: Rad (assistant)
- 2013–2016: Újpest (assistant)
- 2017–2018: Rad (sporting director)
- * Club domestic league appearances and goals

Zoran Čampara (Serbian Cyrillic: Зоран Чампара; born 16 February 1972) is a Serbian retired footballer who played as a defender.

== Playing career ==
Čampara started out at Iskra Bugojno, collecting 51 appearances and scoring one goal in the Yugoslav Second League between 1989 and 1991. He subsequently joined Yugoslav First League club Velež Mostar, making eight appearances in the competition's final 1991–92 season.

With the breakup of Yugoslavia, Čampara relocated to Belgrade and started playing for Rad in the First League of FR Yugoslavia. He spent three seasons with the club, amassing 91 matches and netting 10 goals in the top flight.

In 1995, Čampara moved abroad to Spain and signed with Segunda División club Lleida. He played 35 league games and scored five times in two seasons. In 1997, Čampara signed with Belgian side Royal Antwerp, spending the next seven years with the club.

== Post-playing career ==
In 2008, Čampara became sporting director of his former club Rad. He left the position in March 2011. In July of that year, Čampara took over the same role at Hajduk Kula, but left the club less than three months later after the dismissal of manager Nebojša Vignjević. He subsequently served as assistant manager to Vignjević at Rad (October 2011 to February 2012) and Újpest (October 2013 to December 2016). In June 2017, Čampara returned to Rad as sporting director. He left the position in November 2018.

== Career statistics ==
Club	Season	League	
Club	Season	Apps	Goals
Iskra Bugojno	1989–90	28	0
Iskra Bugojno	1990–91	23	1
Iskra Bugojno	Total	51	1
Velež Mostar	1991–92	8	0
Rad	1992–93	33	1
Rad	1993–94	33	7
Rad	1994–95	25	2
Rad	Total	91	10
Lleida	1995–96	26	3
Lleida	1996–97	9	2
Lleida	Total	35	5
Royal Antwerp	1997–98	17	0
Royal Antwerp	1998–99	23	3
Royal Antwerp	1999–2000	29	3
Royal Antwerp	2000–01	14	0
Royal Antwerp	2001–02	15	0
Royal Antwerp	2002–03	17	0
Royal Antwerp	2003–04	13	0
Royal Antwerp	Total	128	6
Shandong Luneng (loan)	2003	5	1
Beitar Jerusalem (loan)	2003–04	3	0
Career total		321	23

== Honours ==
Royal Antwerp

- Belgian Second Division: 1999–2000
