= Martín Astudillo =

Argentine footballer and manager

Personal information
- Full name: Martín Mauricio Astudillo
- Date of birth: 11 October 1977 (age 49)
- Place of birth: Mendoza, Argentina
- Height: 1.87 m (6 ft 2 in)
- Position: Midfielder

Senior career*
Years	Team	Apps	(Gls)
1995–1997	Godoy Cruz	55	(3)
1997–1999	Gimnasia Jujuy	67	(2)
1999–2009	Alavés	311	(19)
2008	→ Osasuna (loan)	13	(1)
2009–2010	Rosario Central	11	(0)
2012	Deportivo Maipú		
2014–2015	Atlético Argentino		
Total		457	(25)

Managerial career
- 2016–2017: Independiente Rivadavia
- 2017–2018: Gimnasia Jujuy
- 2019–2020: Huracán Las Heras
- * Club domestic league appearances and goals

Martín Mauricio Astudillo (born 11 October 1977) is an Argentine former professional footballer who played as a defensive midfielder, currently a manager.

He spent one decade in Spain with Alavés, appearing in 149 matches in La Liga and 162 in the Segunda División.

== Club career ==
Born in Mendoza, Astudillo started his career in the Primera Nacional with Godoy Cruz Antonio Tomba of Mendoza Province. In 1997, he was signed by Gimnasia y Esgrima de Jujuy of the Primera División, and two years later moved to Deportivo Alavés in Spain.

First-choice from the start, Astudillo scored four league goals in his first season, and was instrumental in the Basque side's runner-up run in the UEFA Cup the next year. In the following campaign he only missed one match and netted on five occasions, helping his team finish seventh in La Liga.

Astudillo remained loyal to Alavés throughout the vast majority of his Spanish stint, playing in the top flight as well as the Segunda División as they were twice relegated from the former (in 2003–04, he collected a season-worst 19 yellow cards). However, in January 2008, he rejoined the top tier, signing on loan with CA Osasuna who had lost another central midfielder, Javad Nekounam, severely injured in preseason.

During the season, Astudillo was instrumental in helping the Navarrese barely escape relegation as he scored the game's only goal at RCD Espanyol on 13 April 2008. In August 2009, after Alavés suffered relegation to the Segunda División B, he bought out the remainder of his contract and returned to his country after ten years, joining Rosario Central; he made a best-ever 346 competitive appearances for his main club.
