= Rubén Navarro (Spanish footballer) =

Spanish footballer

Personal information
- Full name: Rubén Navarro Méndez
- Date of birth: 6 June 1978 (age 48)
- Place of birth: Sallent, Spain
- Height: 1.80 m (5 ft 11 in)
- Position: Striker

Youth career
- Sallent
- Valencia

Senior career*
Years	Team	Apps	(Gls)
1996–1999	Valencia B	74	(21)
1997–1999	Valencia	6	(0)
1999–2001	Numancia	55	(17)
2001–2007	Alavés	178	(43)
2007–2009	Hércules	55	(22)
2009–2011	Gimnàstic	40	(6)
2011–2012	Leganés	32	(12)
Total		440	(121)
- * Club domestic league appearances and goals

Rubén Navarro Méndez (born 6 June 1978) is a Spanish former professional footballer who played as a striker.

He amassed La Liga totals of 147 games and 31 goals over seven seasons, representing Valencia, Numancia and Alavés. He added 187 matches and 57 goals in the Segunda División, in a 16-year senior career.

== Club career ==
Navarro was born in Sallent de Llobregat, Barcelona, Catalonia. A product of Valencia CF's youth system, he first appeared in La Liga on 15 June 1997 in a 2–1 home win against Real Oviedo, but could never settle at his first club, moving to CD Numancia where he played two years; he scored ten league goals in his first season in Soria in spite of injury problems, helping barely avoid top-flight relegation.

Subsequently, Navarro joined Deportivo Alavés after the side's runner-up exploits in the UEFA Cup. He was an important attacking element for six years, three spent in the Segunda División; in three of those campaigns, he netted in double digits.

Navarro signed with another team in the second tier for 2007–08, Hércules CF. On 5 April 2009, as they eventually narrowly missed on promotion, he scored a hat-trick against Sevilla Atlético in an 8–0 home rout.

In late June 2009, Navarro returned to his native region after nearly 15 years, signing as a free agent with Gimnàstic de Tarragona for two years. On 2 September 2011, after two seasons of irregular use after which he did not have his contract renewed and was released, the 33-year-old joined CD Leganés in the Segunda División B.
