= Carlos Llorens =

Spanish footballer

Personal information
- Full name: Carlos Llorens Mestre
- Date of birth: 1 September 1969 (age 57)
- Place of birth: Alicante, Spain
- Height: 1.77 m (5 ft 10 in)
- Position: Left-back

Youth career
- Valencia

Senior career*
Years	Team	Apps	(Gls)
1991–1992	Tomelloso	36	(3)
1992–1993	Cartagena	22	(0)
1993–1994	Elche	28	(1)
1994–1995	Levante	33	(1)
1995–1997	Lleida	61	(0)
1997–1998	Leganés	40	(10)
1998–2000	Rayo Vallecano	69	(9)
2000–2002	Atlético Madrid	12	(0)
2001	→ Osasuna (loan)	19	(0)
2001–2002	→ Alavés (loan)	36	(6)
2002–2003	Alavés	35	(1)
2003–2006	Poli Ejido	99	(0)
2006–2009	Rayo Vallecano	83	(7)
Total		573	(38)
- * Club domestic league appearances and goals

Carlos Llorens Mestre (born 1 September 1969) is a Spanish former professional footballer who played as a left-back.

A player of attacking penchant, he was also a penalty kick specialist. He played for 11 teams during his career, amassing La Liga totals of 125 games and 11 goals with Rayo Vallecano, Osasuna and Alavés and retiring at the age of 40.

== Club career ==
Born in Alicante, Valencian Community, Llorens had to wait until the age of 26 to make his professional debut, in the Segunda División with UE Lleida. He went on to establish himself in that tier with CD Leganés and Rayo Vallecano, winning a promotion with the latter, a club to which he would later be intimately connected; his first match in La Liga arrived at almost 30 in a 2–0 derby win at Atlético Madrid on 22 August 1999– Rayo finished the season ninth and qualified for the UEFA Cup via the fair play award.

In the summer of 2000, unwilling to leave the club, Llorens was nonetheless part of a package deal that sent him to precisely Atlético, by then in the second division. In January 2001, however, he returned to the top flight with CA Osasuna on loan. Subsequently, he experienced two very different seasons at Deportivo Alavés: in his first he scored six goals in 36 games, four from penalties, and the Basque team qualified for Europe once again, but suffered relegation the following campaign.

After three additional seasons in division two with modest Polideportivo Ejido, Llorens returned to Rayo at 37, helping it to return to the second tier in his second year. In the following year, as the Madrid side eventually finished in mid-table, he was still going strong, aged nearly 40; he finished his second stint in June 2009, retiring shortly after with professional totals of 395 matches and 27 goals.
