= 2000–01 UEFA Cup qualifying round =

The qualifying round of the 2000–01 UEFA Cup was played from 8 to 24 August 2000. The round consisted of 41 matches.

== Summary ==
Team 1	Agg.	Team 2	1st leg	2nd leg
Universitatea Craiova (Romania)	1–2	(North Macedonia) Pobeda	1–1	0–1
Folgore (San Marino)	1–12	(Switzerland) Basel	1–5	0–7
Neftçi (Azerbaijan)	2–3	(Slovenia) HIT Gorica	1–0	1–3
Rapid Wien (Austria)	6–0	(Albania) Teuta	2–0	4–0
Club Brugge (Belgium)	6–1	(Estonia) Flora	4–1	2–0
ÍBV (Iceland)	0–5	(Scotland) Heart of Midlothian	0–2	0–3
AB (Denmark)	9–0	(Faroe Islands) B36	8–0	1–0
Coleraine (Northern Ireland)	1–3	(Sweden) Örgryte IS	1–2	0–1
Ararat Yerevan (Armenia)	3–4	(Slovakia) Košice	2–3	1–1
Napredak Kruševac (Federal Republic of Yugoslavia)	6–2	(Estonia) Viljandi Tulevik	5–1	1–1
MTK Hungária (Hungary)	5–2	(Finland) Jokerit	1–0	4–2
Vorskla Poltava (Ukraine)	4–0	(North Macedonia) Rabotnicki	2–0	2–0
ÍA (Iceland)	2–6	(Belgium) Gent	2–3	0–3
Bangor City (Wales)	0–11	(Sweden) Halmstads BK	0–7	0–4
Ventspils (Latvia)	3–4	(Hungary) Vasas	2–1	1–3 (a.e.t.)
Jeunesse Esch (Luxembourg)	0–11	(Scotland) Celtic	0–4	0–7
Drnovice (Czech Republic)	4–0	(Bosnia and Herzegovina) Budućnost Banovići	3–0	1–0
Tomori (Albania)	2–5	(Cyprus) APOEL	2–3	0–2
Rapid București (Romania)	3–1	(Armenia) Mika	3–0	0–1
WIT Georgia (Georgia (country))	1–4	(Israel) Beitar Jerusalem	0–3	1–1
Omonia (Cyprus)	1–2	(Bulgaria) Neftochimic Burgas	0–0	1–2
Željezničar (Bosnia and Herzegovina)	1–3	(Poland) Wisła Kraków	0–0	1–3
Sheriff Tiraspol (Moldova)	0–3	(Slovenia) Olimpija Ljubljana	0–0	0–3
Kapaz (Azerbaijan)	0–7	(Turkey) Antalyaspor	0–2	0–5
Žalgiris (Lithuania)	2–7	(Poland) Ruch Chorzów	2–1	0–6
Aberdeen (Scotland)	2–2 (a)	(Republic of Ireland) Bohemians	1–2	1–0
GÍ (Faroe Islands)	1–4	(Sweden) IFK Norrköping	0–2	1–2
Liepājas Metalurgs (Latvia)	1–2	(Norway) Brann	1–1	0–1
Slavia Mozyr (Belarus)	1–1 (a)	(Israel) Maccabi Haifa	1–1	0–0
Slovan Bratislava (Slovakia)	4–0	(Georgia (country)) Locomotive Tbilisi	2–0	2–0
Sliema Wanderers (Malta)	3–5	(Federal Republic of Yugoslavia) Partizan	2–1	1–4
Constructorul Chișinău (Moldova)	2–11	(Bulgaria) CSKA Sofia	2–3	0–8
AIK (Sweden)	3–0	(Belarus) Gomel	1–0	2–0
HJK (Finland)	4–3	(Luxembourg) Grevenmacher	4–1	0–2
Glentoran (Northern Ireland)	0–4	(Norway) Lillestrøm	0–3	0–1
Ekranas (Lithuania)	0–7	(Belgium) Lierse	0–3	0–4
Boavista (Portugal)	5–0	(Wales) Barry Town	2–0	3–0
Constel·lació (Andorra)	0–16	(Spain) Rayo Vallecano	0–10	0–6
Lausanne-Sports (Switzerland)	2–0	(Republic of Ireland) Cork City	1–0	1–0
Rijeka (Croatia)	8–6	(Malta) Valletta	3–2	5–4 (a.e.t.)
Amica Wronki (Poland)	6–3	(Liechtenstein) Vaduz	3–0	3–3

== Matches ==
10 August 2000
17:00

Universitatea Craiova (Romania)	1–1	(North Macedonia) Pobeda
Papură 31'	Report	Zdravevski 90'

Stadionul Ion Oblemenco, Craiova
Attendance: 7,300
Referee: Nicolai Vollquartz (Denmark)
24 August 2000
16:45

Pobeda (North Macedonia)	1–0	(Romania) Universitatea Craiova
Zdravevski 78'	Report

Stadion Goce Delčev, Prilep
Attendance: 4,500
Referee: Michal Beneš (Czech Republic)

Pobeda won 2–1 on aggregate.

10 August 2000
20:00

Folgore (San Marino)	1–5	(Switzerland) Basel
Zanotti 79'	Report	Tchouga 13', 22'; Muff 40'; Magro 48', 77'

Stadio Olimpico, Serravalle
Attendance: 1,580
Referee: José Luis Mengual Prades (Andorra)
24 August 2000
20:00

Basel (Switzerland)	7–0	(San Marino) Folgore
Muff 7'; Magro 19', 21'; Cantaluppi 30'; Tholot 39', 85'; Koumantarakis 81'	Report

Hardturm, Zürich
Attendance: 2,110
Referee: David Malcolm (Northern Ireland)

Basel won 12–1 on aggregate.

10 August 2000
15:00

Neftçi (Azerbaijan)	1–0	(Slovenia) HIT Gorica
Huseynov 1'	Report

Tofiq Bahramov Stadium, Baku
Attendance: 4,000
Referee: Karel Vidlak (Czech Republic)
24 August 2000
17:00

HIT Gorica (Slovenia)	3–1	(Azerbaijan) Neftçi
Žlogar 11', 87'; Gutalj 90'	Report	Musayev 62'

Nova Gorica Sports Park, Nova Gorica
Attendance: 1,500
Referee: Haim Jakov (Israel)

HIT Gorica won 3–2 on aggregate.

10 August 2000
18:00

Rapid Wien (Austria)	2–0	(Albania) Teuta
Wagner 50'; Schöttel 77'	Report

Gerhard Hanappi Stadium, Vienna
Attendance: 4,500
Referee: Darius Miezelis (Lithuania)
24 August 2000
17:30

Teuta (Albania)	0–4	(Austria) Rapid Wien
	Report	Lagonikakis 21'; Wetl 26', 76'; Wagner 66'

Qemal Stafa Stadium, Tirana
Attendance: 2,500
Referee: Spiridon Papadakos (Greece)

Rapid Wien won 6–0 on aggregate.

10 August 2000
20:00

Club Brugge (Belgium)	4–1	(Estonia) Flora
Fadiga 40', 53'; Mendoza 79'; Verheyen 83'	Report	Saviauk 20'

Jan Breydel Stadium, Bruges
Attendance: 3,590
Referee: Eduardo Iturralde González (Spain)
23 August 2000
16:15

Flora (Estonia)	0–2	(Belgium) Club Brugge
	Report	Vermant 23'; Martens 82'

Kadriorg Stadium, Tallinn
Attendance: 171
Referee: Kjell Alseth (Norway)

Club Brugge won 6–1 on aggregate.

10 August 2000
21:00

ÍBV (Iceland)	0–2	(Scotland) Heart of Midlothian
	Report	Severin 48'; Jackson 66'

Laugardalsvöllur, Reykjavík
Attendance: 861
Referee: Stéphane Moulin (France)
24 August 2000
20:45

Heart of Midlothian (Scotland)	3–0	(Iceland) ÍBV
McSwegan 6'; Tomaschek 19'; O'Neill 39'	Report

Tynecastle Stadium, Edinburgh
Attendance: 8,720
Referee: Antonio Manuel Almeida Costa (Portugal)

Heart of Midlothian won 5–0 on aggregate.

10 August 2000
20:05

AB (Denmark)	8–0	(Faroe Islands) B36
Michaelsen 33'; Johansen 45'; Daugaard 48'; Sule 57', 58'; Rasmussen 67', 70'; Bjur 69'	Report

Gladsaxe Stadium, Gladsaxe
Attendance: 4,098
Referee: Levan Paniashvili (Georgia)
24 August 2000
19:30

B36 (Faroe Islands)	0–1	(Denmark) AB
	Report	Nielsen 70'

Tórsvøllur, Tórshavn
Attendance: 750
Referee: Eric Romain (Belgium)

AB won 9–0 on aggregate.

10 August 2000
20:30

Coleraine (Northern Ireland)	1–2	(Sweden) Örgryte IS
McLaughlin 59'	Report	Hemberg 8'; Johannesson 82'

The Showgrounds, Coleraine
Attendance: 780
Referee: Yuri Baskakov (Russia)
24 August 2000
19:30

Örgryte IS (Sweden)	1–0	(Northern Ireland) Coleraine
Kuhn 45'	Report

Ullevi, Gothenburg
Attendance: 2,350
Referee: Miroslaw Ryszka (Poland)

Örgryte IS won 3–1 on aggregate.

10 August 2000
15:30

Ararat Yerevan (Armenia)	2–3	(Slovakia) Košice
Nigoyan 51'; Hovakimyan 87'	Report	Barseghyan 14' (o.g.); Lyubarskyi 52'; Oravec 82'

Gyumri City Stadium, Gyumri
Attendance: 1,500
Referee: Aleh Chykun (Belarus)
24 August 2000
16:00

Košice (Slovakia)	1–1	(Armenia) Ararat Yerevan
Lyubarskyi 65'	Report	Nigoyan 74' (pen.)

Lokomotíva Stadium, Košice
Attendance: 1,116
Referee: Paul McKeon (Republic of Ireland)

Košice won 4–2 on aggregate.

10 August 2000
17:30

Napredak Kruševac (Federal Republic of Yugoslavia)	5–1	(Estonia) Viljandi Tulevik
Belic 6', 20'; Kojičić 23', 45', 83'	Report	Ustritski 48'

Stadion Mladost, Kruševac
Attendance: 6,807
Referee: Bernhard Brugger (Austria)
24 August 2000
16:15

Viljandi Tulevik (Estonia)	1–1	(Federal Republic of Yugoslavia) Napredak Kruševac
Ustritski 37'	Report	Belic 45'

Valga Keskstaadion, Valga
Attendance: 400
Referee: Anton Stredak (Slovakia)

Napredak Kruševac won 6–2 on aggregate.

10 August 2000
20:15

MTK Hungária (Hungary)	1–0	(Finland) Jokerit
Illés 6'	Report

Hidegkuti Nándor Stadium, Budapest
Attendance: 1,500
Referee: Andreas Schluchter (Switzerland)
24 August 2000
18:00

Jokerit (Finland)	2–4	(Hungary) MTK Hungária
Hyryläinen 63'; Sumiala 83'	Report	Ferenczi 20', 88'; Illés 58'; Kuttor 74'

Helsinki Olympic Stadium, Helsinki
Attendance: 2,476
Referee: John Rowbotham (Scotland)

MTK Hungária won 5–2 on aggregate.

10 August 2000
19:00

Vorskla Poltava (Ukraine)	2–0	(North Macedonia) Rabotnicki
Kobzar 34'; Melaschenko 65'	Report

Vorskla Stadium, Poltava
Attendance: 8,300
Referee: Martin Ingvarsson (Sweden)
24 August 2000
21:00

Rabotnicki (North Macedonia)	0–2	(Ukraine) Vorskla Poltava
	Report	Melaschenko 9'; Kobzar 47'

City Stadium Skopje, Skopje
Attendance: 4,000
Referee: Kenny Clark (Scotland)

Vorskla Poltava won 4–0 on aggregate.

8 August 2000
20:00

ÍA (Iceland)	0–3	(Belgium) Gent
	Report	Schepens 34'; Pedersen 80'; Olcese 90'

Laugardalsvöllur, Reykjavík
Attendance: 1,226
Referee: Drago Kos (Slovenia)
24 August 2000
21:00

Gent (Belgium)	3–2	(Iceland) ÍA
Kaklamanos 17', 72'; Çipi 65'	Report	Hinriksson 8'; Reynisson 43'

Jules Ottenstadion, Ghent
Attendance: 3,041
Referee: Attila Juhos (Hungary)

Gent won 6–2 on aggregate.

10 August 2000
20:30

Bangor City (Wales)	0–7	(Sweden) Halmstads BK
	Report	R. Andersson 29'; Svensson 31'; Arvidsson 44'; Selaković 49', 81'; Karlsson 86'; Bertilsson 90'

Racecourse Ground, Wrexham
Attendance: 761
Referee: Oleg Timofejev (Estonia)
24 August 2000
19:00

Halmstads BK (Sweden)	4–0	(Wales) Bangor City
Arvidsson 6', 26'; Bertilsson 35'; Selaković 77'	Report

Örjans Vall, Halmstad
Attendance: 646
Referee: Nikolai Vladimirovich Ivanov (Russia)

Halmstads BK won 11–0 on aggregate.

10 August 2000
17:00

Ventspils (Latvia)	2–1	(Hungary) Vasas
Landyrev 18', 44'	Report	Szili 87'

Ventspils Olimpiskais Stadions, Ventspils
Attendance: 3,200
Referee: Zbigniew Marczyk (Poland)
24 August 2000
20:45

Vasas (Hungary)	3–1 (a.e.t.)	(Latvia) Ventspils
Kabát 14'; Pető 75', 102'	Report	Bezborodov 6'

Ferenc Puskás Stadium, Budapest
Attendance: 800
Referee: Delce Jakimovski (Macedonia)

Vasas won 4–3 on aggregate.

10 August 2000
20:30

Jeunesse Esch (Luxembourg)	0–4	(Scotland) Celtic
	Report	Moravčík 37', 57'; Larsson 62'; Lambert 80'

Stade Josy Barthel, Luxembourg City
Attendance: 3,587
Referee: Georgios Kasnaferis (Greece)

24 August 2000
20:45

Celtic (Scotland)	7–0	(Luxembourg) Jeunesse Esch
Burchill 12', 14', 15'; Berkovic 20', 46'; Riseth 53'; Petrov 71'	Report

Celtic Park, Glasgow
Attendance: 40,519
Referee: Philippe Leuba (Switzerland)

Celtic won 11–0 on aggregate.

10 August 2000
18:00

Drnovice (Czech Republic)	3–0	(Bosnia and Herzegovina) Budućnost Banovići
Zavadil 45'; Cupák 66', 72'	Report

Sportovní areál, Drnovice
Attendance: 4,256
Referee: Asim Khudiyev (Azerbaijan)
24 August 2000
17:00

Budućnost Banovići (Bosnia and Herzegovina)	0–1	(Czech Republic) Drnovice
	Report	Gomes 70'

Stadion FK Budućnost, Banovići
Attendance: 2,482
Referee: Stéphane Moulin (France)

Drnovice won 4–0 on aggregate.

10 August 2000
17:30

Tomori (Albania)	2–3	(Cyprus) APOEL
Lako 60'; Fani 90'	Report	Obiku 23'; Škorić 25'; Yiasoumi 37'

Qemal Stafa Stadium, Tirana
Attendance: 700
Referee: Dick van Egmond (Netherlands)
24 August 2000
19:30

APOEL (Cyprus)	2–0	(Albania) Tomori
Yiasoumi 30'; Obiku 30'	Report

GSP Stadium, Nicosia
Attendance: 2,400
Referee: Ceri Richards (Wales)

APOEL won 5–2 on aggregate.

10 August 2000
19:00

Rapid București (Romania)	3–0	(Armenia) Mika
Iencsi 37'; Măldărășanu 40'; Constantin 90'	Report

Stadionul Giulești-Valentin Stănescu, Bucharest
Attendance: 7,000
Referee: Zoltan Szarka (Hungary)
24 August 2000
15:00

Mika (Armenia)	1–0	(Romania) Rapid București
Nikolyan 77'	Report

Gyumri City Stadium, Gyumri
Attendance: 500
Referee: Knud Stadsgaard (Denmark)

Rapid București won 3–1 on aggregate.

10 August 2000
17:00

WIT Georgia (Georgia (country))	0–3	(Israel) Beitar Jerusalem
	Report	Mizrahi 30'; Ganon 60'; Roso 90'

Boris Paichadze National Stadium, Tbilisi
Attendance: 3,000
Referee: Metin Tokat (Turkey)
24 August 2000
19:45

Beitar Jerusalem (Israel)	1–1	(Georgia (country)) WIT Georgia
Sándor 47'	Report	Melkadze 65'

Teddy Stadium, Jerusalem
Attendance: 3,000
Referee: Krzysztof Slupik (Poland)

Beitar Jerusalem won 4–1 on aggregate.

10 August 2000
19:00

Omonia (Cyprus)	0–0	(Bulgaria) Neftochimic Burgas
	Report

GSP Stadium, Nicosia
Attendance: 17,000
Referee: Sergey Gusev (Russia)
24 August 2000
19:00

Neftochimic Burgas (Bulgaria)	2–1	(Cyprus) Omonia
Timnev 14', 43'	Report	Mihajlović 36'

Lazur Stadium, Burgas
Attendance: 8,000
Referee: Luc Huyghe (Belgium)

Neftochimic Burgas won 2–1 on aggregate.

10 August 2000
20:15

Željezničar (Bosnia and Herzegovina)	0–0	(Poland) Wisła Kraków
	Report

Asim Ferhatović Hase Stadium, Sarajevo
Attendance: 16,000
Referee: Franz-Xaver Wack (Germany)
24 August 2000
17:05

Wisła Kraków (Poland)	3–1	(Bosnia and Herzegovina) Željezničar
Frankowski 25', 53', 59'	Report	Muharemović 34'

Stadion Miejski in Kraków, Kraków
Attendance: 5,000
Referee: Georgios Borovilos (Greece)

Wisła Kraków won 3–1 on aggregate.

10 August 2000
16:00

Sheriff Tiraspol (Moldova)	0–0	(Slovenia) Olimpija Ljubljana
	Report

Stadionul Municipal, Tiraspol
Attendance: 3,500
Referee: Jon Skjervold (Norway)
24 August 2000
20:00

Olimpija Ljubljana (Slovenia)	3–0	(Moldova) Sheriff Tiraspol
Ošlaj 30', 70'; Cimirotič 90'	Report

Bežigrad Stadium, Ljubljana
Attendance: 1,800
Referee: Paulo Manuel Gomes Costa (Portugal)

Olimpija Ljubljana won 3–0 on aggregate.

8 August 2000
17:00

Kapaz (Azerbaijan)	0–2	(Turkey) Antalyaspor
	Report	Kınalı 37'; Anđelković 51'

Tofiq Bahramov Stadium, Baku
Attendance: 13,000
Referee: Marcel Lica (Romania)
24 August 2000
20:00

Antalyaspor (Turkey)	5–0	(Azerbaijan) Kapaz
Kınalı 3'; Musić 50', 88'; Çakir 67'; Kariklar 76'	Report

Atatürk Olympic Stadium, Istanbul
Attendance: 1,500
Referee: Vladimir Antonov (Moldova)

Antalyaspor won 7–0 on aggregate.

10 August 2000
16:35

Žalgiris (Lithuania)	2–1	(Poland) Ruch Chorzów
Saulėnas 33'; Vilėniškis 55'	Report	Paluch 14'

Žalgiris Stadium, Vilnius
Attendance: 1,200
Referee: Goran Maric (Croatia)
24 August 2000
19:30

Ruch Chorzów (Poland)	6–0	(Lithuania) Žalgiris
Paluch 14'; Bizacki 37'; Jikia 43', 45'; Surma 78'; Mizia 86'	Report

Stadion Ruchu, Chorzów
Attendance: 1,300
Referee: Éric Poulat (France)

Ruch Chorzów won 7–2 on aggregate.

10 August 2000
20:45

Aberdeen (Scotland)	1–2	(Republic of Ireland) Bohemians
Winters 62'	Report	Maher 81'; Molloy 87'

Pittodrie Stadium, Aberdeen
Attendance: 13,638
Referee: Kristinn Jakobsson (Iceland)
24 August 2000
20:45

Bohemians (Republic of Ireland)	0–1	(Scotland) Aberdeen
	Report	Morrison 69' (o.g.)

Tolka Park, Dublin
Attendance: 7,450
Referee: Leif Sundell (Sweden)

2–2 on aggregate; Bohemians won on away goals.

10 August 2000
20:00

GÍ (Faroe Islands)	0–2	(Sweden) IFK Norrköping
	Report	Wallerstedt 55'; Bergström 86'

Tórsvøllur, Tórshavn
Attendance: 750
Referee: René Rogalla (Switzerland)
24 August 2000
19:00

IFK Norrköping (Sweden)	2–1	(Faroe Islands) GÍ
Flodström 40'; Andersson 56'	Report	Olsen 49'

Idrottsparken, Norrköping
Attendance: 5,771
Referee: Henri Diederich (Luxembourg)

IFK Norrköping won 4–1 on aggregate.

10 August 2000
17:00

Liepājas Metalurgs (Latvia)	1–1	(Norway) Brann
Soloņicins 80'	Report	Karadas 5'

Skonto Stadium, Riga
Attendance: 3,200
Referee: Roland Beck (Liechtenstein)
24 August 2000
19:00

Brann (Norway)	1–0	(Latvia) Liepājas Metalurgs
Ražanauskas 69'	Report

Brann Stadion, Bergen
Attendance: 2,276
Referee: Ante Kulusic (Croatia)

Brann won 2–1 on aggregate.

10 August 2000
17:00

Slavia Mozyr (Belarus)	1–1	(Israel) Maccabi Haifa
Shutov 50'	Report	Katan 47'

Yunost Stadium, Mozyr
Attendance: 5,200
Referee: Ferenc Bede (Hungary)
24 August 2000
18:00

Maccabi Haifa (Israel)	0–0	(Belarus) Slavia Mozyr
	Report

Kiryat Eliezer Stadium, Haifa
Attendance: 3,470
Referee: Erol Ersoy (Turkey)

1–1 on aggregate; Maccabi Haifa won on away goals.

10 August 2000
17:00

Slovan Bratislava (Slovakia)	2–0	(Georgia (country)) Locomotive Tbilisi
Jančula 37'; Hrnčár 70'	Report

Tehelné pole, Bratislava
Attendance: 4,320
Referee: Kamen Alexiev (Bulgaria)
24 August 2000
16:00

Locomotive Tbilisi (Georgia (country))	0–2	(Slovakia) Slovan Bratislava
	Report	Meszároš 37'; Gögh 80'

Dinamo Arena, Tbilisi
Attendance: 3,500
Referee: Steve Dunn (England)

Slovan Bratislava won 4–0 on aggregate.

10 August 2000
18:00

Sliema Wanderers (Malta)	2–1	(Federal Republic of Yugoslavia) Partizan
Sylla 10'; Busuttil 72'	Report	Ilić 35'

Ta' Qali National Stadium, Attard
Attendance: 250
Referee: Mario van der Ende (Netherlands)
24 August 2000
19:30

Partizan (Federal Republic of Yugoslavia)	4–1	(Malta) Sliema Wanderers
Ilić 4', 32', 45'; Ranković 60'	Report	Turner 90'

Partizan Stadium, Belgrade
Attendance: 5,616
Referee: Muhittin Bosat (Turkey)

Partizan won 5–3 on aggregate.

10 August 2000
17:00

Constructorul Chișinău (Moldova)	2–3	(Bulgaria) CSKA Sofia
Druta 26'; Zabolotnîi 83'	Report	Berbatov 6', 21'; Mirchev 85'

Stadionul Moldova, Speia
Attendance: 3,500
Referee: Fernando Carmona Mendez (Spain)
24 August 2000
19:30

CSKA Sofia (Bulgaria)	8–0	(Moldova) Constructorul Chișinău
Yanchev 16' (pen.); Petrov 19' (pen.); Berbatov 36', 42', 44', 53', 77'; Yanev 79'	Report

Balgarska Armia Stadium, Sofia
Attendance: 10,400
Referee: Giannakis Kiprianides (Cyprus)

CSKA Sofia won 11–2 on aggregate.

10 August 2000
19:00

AIK (Sweden)	1–0	(Belarus) Gomel
Tjernström 28'	Report

Råsunda Stadium, Solna
Attendance: 7,746
Referee: Attila Ábrahám (Hungary)
24 August 2000
19:00

Gomel (Belarus)	0–2	(Sweden) AIK
	Report	Alm 77'; Mattiasson 88' (pen.)

Dinamo Stadium, Minsk
Attendance: 9,000
Referee: Marian Mircea Salomir (Romania)

AIK won 3–0 on aggregate.

10 August 2000
17:00

HJK (Finland)	4–1	(Luxembourg) Grevenmacher
Rafael 3'; Roiha 18'; Yeryomenko 78'; Haarala 83'	Report	Huss 56'

ISS Stadion, Vantaa
Attendance: 1,720
Referee: Bragi Bergmann (Iceland)
24 August 2000
20:00

Grevenmacher (Luxembourg)	2–0	(Finland) HJK
Rodrigues 58'; Thill 90'	Report

Stade Josy Barthel, Luxembourg City
Attendance: 800
Referee: Slavik Kazaryan (Armenia)

HJK won 3–2 on aggregate.

10 August 2000
20:30

Glentoran (Northern Ireland)	0–3	(Norway) Lillestrøm
	Report	Powell 20'; Berntsen 37'; Sundgot 53'

The Oval, Belfast
Attendance: 1,293
Referee: Igor Yarmenchuk (Russia)
24 August 2000
18:00

Lillestrøm (Norway)	1–0	(Northern Ireland) Glentoran
Powell 61'	Report

Åråsen Stadion, Lillestrøm
Attendance: 1,046
Referee: Eric Blareau (Belgium)

Lillestrøm won 4–0 on aggregate.

10 August 2000
16:30

Ekranas (Lithuania)	0–3	(Belgium) Lierse
	Report	Claeys 3'; Van Meir 6'; Cavens 78'

Aukštaitija Stadium, Panevėžys
Attendance: 2,500
Referee: Mika Peltola (Finland)
24 August 2000
19:00

Lierse (Belgium)	4–0	(Lithuania) Ekranas
Claeys 7'; Snoeckx 47', 89'; Spiteri 60'	Report

Het Kuipje, Westerlo
Attendance: 1,576
Referee: Georgios Fassolis (Greece)

Lierse won 7–0 on aggregate.

10 August 2000
22:00

Boavista (Portugal)	2–0	(Wales) Barry Town
Silva 22'; Rogério 40'	Report

Estádio do Bessa, Porto
Attendance: 3,039
Referee: Jack van Hulten (Netherlands)
24 August 2000
20:30

Barry Town (Wales)	0–3	(Portugal) Boavista
	Report	Rogério 14'; Silva 54'; Sánchez 60'

Jenner Park Stadium, Barry
Attendance: 1,372
Referee: Lawrence Sammut (Malta)

Boavista won 5–0 on aggregate.

10 August 2000
20:30

Constel·lació (Andorra)	0–10	(Spain) Rayo Vallecano
	Report	Míchel 13', 65'; Cembranos 28'; Bolić 31', 39', 59', 67'; Bolo 36', 42', 71'

Estadi Comunal d'Andorra la Vella, Andorra la Vella
Attendance: 756
Referee: Charles Schaack (Luxembourg)
24 August 2000
21:00

Rayo Vallecano (Spain)	6–0	(Andorra) Constel·lació
Cembranos 20'; Bolo 42', 55'; Sanz 58'; Míchel 72'; Bolić 90'	Report

Estadio Teresa Rivero, Madrid
Attendance: 5,440
Referee: Miroslav Vitković (Croatia)

Rayo Vallecano won 16–0 on aggregate.

10 August 2000
19:30

Lausanne-Sports (Switzerland)	1–0	(Republic of Ireland) Cork City
Horjak 89'	Report

Stade Olympique de la Pontaise, Lausanne
Attendance: 3,800
Referee: Anton Genov (Bulgaria)
24 August 2000
19:00

Cork City (Republic of Ireland)	0–1	(Switzerland) Lausanne-Sports
	Report	Gomes 62'

Turners Cross, Cork
Attendance: 6,000
Referee: Petteri Kari (Iceland)

Lausanne-Sports won 2–0 on aggregate.

10 August 2000
20:30

Rijeka (Croatia)	3–2	(Malta) Valletta
Mijatović 29', 54'; Hasančić 89'	Report	Giglio 19'; Oretan 87'

Stadion Kantrida, Rijeka
Attendance: 4,730
Referee: Wolfgang Sowa (Austria)
24 August 2000
20:00

Valletta (Malta)	4–5 (a.e.t.)	(Croatia) Rijeka
Agius 30', 49', 70'; Carabott 107'	Report	Hasančić 32', 119'; Milicic 64'; Brajković 94'; Bonnici 103' (o.g.)

Ta' Qali National Stadium, Ta' Qali
Attendance: 3,932
Referee: Ladislav Gadosi (Slovakia)

Rijeka won 8–6 on aggregate.

10 August 2000
20:00

Amica Wronki (Poland)	3–0	(Liechtenstein) Vaduz
Kryszałowicz 34'; Dawidowski 78'; Król 89'	Report

Stadion Amica, Wronki
Attendance: 1,128
Referee: Gennady Yakubovsky (Belarus)
24 August 2000
19:30

Vaduz (Liechtenstein)	3–3	(Poland) Amica Wronki
Wegmann 8'; Šlekys 43'; Polverino 75'	Report	Andraszak 14'; Król 23'; Zieńczuk 83'

Rheinpark Stadion, Vaduz
Attendance: 550
Referee: Sead Kulović (Bosnia and Herzegovina)

Amica Wronki won 6–3 on aggregate.
