= 2000–01 UEFA Cup second round =

International football competition

The second round of the 2000–01 UEFA Cup began on 23 October 2000. The round included 48 winners from the first round.

== Teams ==
The following 48 teams participated in the second round.

Key to colours
Winners of second round advanced to third round

Second round participants

Team	Coeff.
(Italy) Internazionale	79.964
(Italy) Parma	78.964
(Netherlands) Ajax	75.333
(Italy) Roma	65.964
(France) Bordeaux	64.364
(Portugal) Porto	61.275
(Netherlands) Feyenoord	60.333
(Czech Republic) Slavia Prague	56.562
(Spain) Celta Vigo	53.799
(England) Liverpool	49.728
(Russia) Lokomotiv Moscow	48.638
(France) Nantes	46.364

Team	Coeff.
(Germany) 1. FC Kaiserslautern	46.201
(Italy) Udinese	43.964
(Greece) AEK Athens	43.433
(Germany) Werder Bremen	43.201
(Germany) VfB Stuttgart	42.201
(Spain) Espanyol	34.799
(Austria) Rapid Wien	34.250
(Belgium) Club Brugge	32.525
(Germany) Hertha BSC	32.201
(Spain) Rayo Vallecano	29.799
(Spain) Alavés	29.799
(Germany) 1860 Munich	29.201

Team	Coeff.
(Netherlands) Vitesse	27.333
(Croatia) Dinamo Zagreb	26.062
(Scotland) Celtic	25.250
(Greece) PAOK	24.433
(Portugal) Boavista	22.275
(Austria) GAK	22.250
(Greece) OFI	18.433
(Hungary) MTK Hungária	17.708
(Czech Republic) Slovan Liberec	14.562
(Belgium) Genk	14.525
(Switzerland) Lausanne-Sports	14.500
(Greece) Iraklis	14.433

Team	Coeff.
(Norway) Lillestrøm	14.050
(Poland) Wisła Kraków	14.000
(Sweden) Halmstads BK	13.767
(Federal Republic of Yugoslavia) Red Star Belgrade	12.708
(Austria) Tirol Innsbruck	11.250
(Poland) Amica Wronki	11.000
(Switzerland) Basel	10.500
(Switzerland) St. Gallen	10.500
(Slovakia) Inter Slovnaft Bratislava	10.416
(Denmark) Viborg	9.087
(Denmark) Herfølge	9.087
(Croatia) Osijek	8.062

== Seeding ==
UEFA allocated the teams into four groups, each with six seeded and six unseeded teams.

Group 1		Group 2		Group 3		Group 4	
Seeded	Unseeded	Seeded	Unseeded	Seeded	Unseeded	Seeded	Unseeded
(Italy) Internazionale; (Czech Republic) Slavia Prague; (Spain) Celta Vigo; (Germany) Werder Bremen; (Austria) Rapid Wien; (Germany) Hertha BSC	(Netherlands) Vitesse; (Greece) OFI; (Belgium) Genk; (Federal Republic of Yugoslavia) Red Star Belgrade; (Poland) Amica Wronki; (Croatia) Osijek	(Italy) Parma; (Netherlands) Feyenoord; (England) Liverpool; (Greece) AEK Athens; (Spain) Espanyol; (Germany) 1860 Munich	(Croatia) Dinamo Zagreb; (Austria) GAK; (Czech Republic) Slovan Liberec; (Sweden) Halmstads BK; (Switzerland) Basel; (Denmark) Herfølge	(Netherlands) Ajax; (Portugal) Porto; (France) Nantes; (Italy) Udinese; (Germany) VfB Stuttgart; (Spain) Rayo Vallecano	(Greece) PAOK; (Hungary) MTK Hungária; (Switzerland) Lausanne-Sports; (Poland) Wisła Kraków; (Austria) Tirol Innsbruck; (Denmark) Viborg	(Italy) Roma; (France) Bordeaux; (Russia) Lokomotiv Moscow; (Germany) 1. FC Kaiserslautern; (Belgium) Club Brugge; (Spain) Alavés	(Scotland) Celtic; (Portugal) Boavista; (Greece) Iraklis; (Norway) Lillestrøm; (Switzerland) St. Gallen; (Slovakia) Inter Slovnaft Bratislava

== Summary ==
Team 1	Agg.	Team 2	1st leg	2nd leg
Iraklis (Greece)	4–5	(Germany) 1. FC Kaiserslautern	1–3	3–2
Osijek (Croatia)	4–1	(Austria) Rapid Wien	2–1	2–0
Udinese (Italy)	1–3	(Greece) PAOK	1–0	0–3 (a.e.t.)
Werder Bremen (Germany)	9–3	(Belgium) Genk	4–1	5–2
Halmstads BK (Sweden)	4–5	(Germany) 1860 Munich	3–2	1–3
AEK Athens (Greece)	6–2	(Denmark) Herfølge	5–0	1–2
Hertha BSC (Germany)	4–2	(Poland) Amica Wronki	3–1	1–1
Lillestrøm (Norway)	3–5	(Spain) Alavés	1–3	2–2
Internazionale (Italy)	1–1 (a)	(Netherlands) Vitesse	0–0	1–1
Bordeaux (France)	3–2	(Scotland) Celtic	1–1	2–1 (a.e.t.)
Espanyol (Spain)	4–1	(Austria) GAK	4–0	0–1
Boavista (Portugal)	1–2	(Italy) Roma	0–1	1–1
Tirol Innsbruck (Austria)	2–3	(Germany) VfB Stuttgart	1–0	1–3
Red Star Belgrade (Federal Republic of Yugoslavia)	1–3	(Spain) Celta Vigo	1–0	0–3 (Note: This 2nd leg match in Vigo actually ended with the score 5–3 for the hosts Celta, but was later awarded as 3–0 win for Celta Vigo since it was discovered that Red Star fielded two suspended players.)
Lokomotiv Moscow (Russia)	3–1	(Slovakia) Inter Slovnaft Bratislava	1–0	2–1
Basel (Switzerland)	1–3	(Netherlands) Feyenoord	1–2	0–1
Liverpool (England)	4–2	(Czech Republic) Slovan Liberec	1–0	3–2
Rayo Vallecano (Spain)	2–2 (a)	(Denmark) Viborg	1–0	1–2
Lausanne-Sports (Switzerland)	3–2	(Netherlands) Ajax	1–0	2–2
Nantes (France)	3–1	(Hungary) MTK Hungária	2–1	1–0
Club Brugge (Belgium)	3–2	(Switzerland) St. Gallen	2–1	1–1
Parma (Italy)	2–1	(Croatia) Dinamo Zagreb	2–0	0–1
OFI (Greece)	3–6	(Czech Republic) Slavia Prague	2–2	1–4
Wisła Kraków (Poland)	0–3	(Portugal) Porto	0–0	0–3

== Matches ==
23 October 2000
18:15

Iraklis (Greece)	1–3	(Germany) 1. FC Kaiserslautern
Konstantinou 47' (pen.)	Report	Klose 7'; Hristov 35'; Tavlaridis 64' (o.g.)

Kaftanzoglio Stadium, Thessaloniki
Attendance: 6,958
Referee: Alan Snoddy (Northern Ireland)
9 November 2000
20:30

1. FC Kaiserslautern (Germany)	2–3	(Greece) Iraklis
Koch 25' (pen.); Djorkaeff 29'	Report	Konstantinou 54', 90'; Ederson 90'

Fritz-Walter-Stadion, Kaiserslautern
Attendance: 14,572
Referee: Mike Riley (England)

1. FC Kaiserslautern won 5–4 on aggregate.

24 October 2000
18:00

Osijek (Croatia)	2–1	(Austria) Rapid Wien
Bjelica 27', 90' (pen.)	Report	Radovic 37'

Stadion Gradski vrt, Osijek
Attendance: 4,280
Referee: Laurent Duhamel (France)
7 November 2000
18:00

Rapid Wien (Austria)	0–2	(Croatia) Osijek
	Report	Bjelica 14'; Jukić 90'

Gerhard Hanappi Stadium, Vienna
Attendance: 11,800
Referee: Sorin Corpodean (Romania)

Osijek won 4–1 on aggregate.

24 October 2000
16:00

Udinese (Italy)	1–0	(Greece) PAOK
Margiotta 90'	Report

Stadio Friuli, Udine
Attendance: 14,258
Referee: Juan Ansuátegui Roca (Spain)
9 November 2000
18:00

PAOK (Greece)	3–0 (a.e.t.)	(Italy) Udinese
Camps 73', 102'; Frousos 108'	Report

Toumba Stadium, Thessaloniki
Attendance: 24,324
Referee: Lutz-Michael Fröhlich (Germany)

PAOK won 3–1 on aggregate.

24 October 2000
18:00

Werder Bremen (Germany)	4–1	(Belgium) Genk
Ernst 16'; Herzog 28'; Baumann 56'; Bode 70'	Report	Sonck 35'

Weserstadion, Bremen
Attendance: 14,150
Referee: Roy Helge Olsen (Norway)
9 November 2000
16:00

Genk (Belgium)	2–5	(Germany) Werder Bremen
Thijs 26'; Zokora 58'	Report	Pizarro 25', 27' (pen.), 44'; Stalteri 75'; Maksymov 81'

Fenix Stadion, Genk
Attendance: 8,449
Referee: Vladimír Hriňák (Slovakia)

Werder Bremen won 9–3 on aggregate.

26 October 2000
20:30

Halmstads BK (Sweden)	3–2	(Germany) 1860 Munich
M. Svensson 13'; Selakovic 34'; R. Andersson 56'	Report	Max 35'; Häßler 38' (pen.)

Örjans Vall, Halmstad
Attendance: 3,145
Referee: Pasquale Rodomonti (Italy)
7 November 2000
18:00

1860 Munich (Germany)	3–1	(Sweden) Halmstads BK
Max 6', 84'; Agostino 44'	Report	R. Andersson 25'

Olympic Stadium, Munich
Attendance: 12,000
Referee: Vasyl Melnychuk (Ukraine)

1860 Munich won 5–4 on aggregate.

26 October 2000
19:00

AEK Athens (Greece)	5–0	(Denmark) Herfølge
Nikolaidis 48', 53', 64', 75'; Zikos 61'	Report

Nikos Goumas Stadium, Nea Filadelfeia
Attendance: 9,075
Referee: Paul Allaerts (Belgium)
7 November 2000
18:00

Herfølge (Denmark)	2–1	(Greece) AEK Athens
Jakobsen 1'; Hermansen 47' (pen.)	Report	Petkov 33'

Herfølge Stadion, Herfølge
Attendance: 1,645
Referee: Paulo Paraty (Portugal)

AEK Athens won 6–2 on aggregate.

26 October 2000
18:30

Hertha BSC (Germany)	3–1	(Poland) Amica Wronki
Preetz 8'; Beinlich 46'; Reiss 66'	Report	Piskuła 88'

Olympic Stadium, Berlin
Attendance: 13,157
Referee: Michal Beneš (Czech Republic)
7 November 2000
16:00

Amica Wronki (Poland)	1–1	(Germany) Hertha BSC
Krol 59'	Report	Veit 66'

Stadion Amica, Wronki
Attendance: 3,297
Referee: Luc Huyghe (Belgium)

Hertha BSC won 4–2 on aggregate.

26 October 2000
18:15

Lillestrøm (Norway)	1–3	(Spain) Alavés
Helland 82'	Report	Begoña 2'; Téllez 21'; Contra 47'

Marienlyst Stadion, Drammen
Attendance: 1,122
Referee: Edo Trivković (Croatia)
9 November 2000
20:30

Alavés (Spain)	2–2	(Norway) Lillestrøm
Magno 1'; Epitié 69'	Report	Strand 4'; Søgård 50'

Mendizorrotza Stadium, Vitoria-Gasteiz
Attendance: 10,307
Referee: Attila Hanacsek (Hungary)

Alavés won 5–3 on aggregate.

26 October 2000
20:45

Internazionale (Italy)	0–0	(Netherlands) Vitesse
	Report

San Siro, Milan
Attendance: 9,093
Referee: Jacek Granat (Poland)
9 November 2000
20:45

Vitesse (Netherlands)	1–1	(Italy) Internazionale
Peeters 15'	Report	Šimić 80'

GelreDome, Arnhem
Attendance: 27,500
Referee: Mike McCurry (Scotland)

1–1 on aggregate; Internazionale won on away goals.

26 October 2000
20:45

Bordeaux (France)	1–1	(Scotland) Celtic
Dugarry 22'	Report	Larsson 26' (pen.)

Stade Chaban-Delmas, Bordeaux
Attendance: 20,717
Referee: Tom Henning Øvrebø (Norway)
9 November 2000
20:45

Celtic (Scotland)	1–2 (a.e.t.)	(France) Bordeaux
Moravčík 54'	Report	Laslandes 79', 114'

Celtic Park, Glasgow
Attendance: 54,542
Referee: Sergey Shmolik (Belarus)

Bordeaux won 3–2 on aggregate.

26 October 2000
21:15

Espanyol (Spain)	4–0	(Austria) GAK
Tamudo 16'; Gâlcă 20' (pen.); Sergio 30', 45'	Report

Estadi Olímpic de Montjuïc, Barcelona
Attendance: 12,500
Referee: Miroslav Liba (Czech Republic)
9 November 2000
20:45

GAK (Austria)	1–0	(Spain) Espanyol
Ehmann 65'	Report

Arnold-Schwarzenegger-Stadion, Graz
Attendance: 2,918
Referee: Jørn Larsen (Denmark)

Espanyol won 4–1 on aggregate.

26 October 2000
22:30

Boavista (Portugal)	0–1	(Italy) Roma
	Report	Montella 74'

Estádio do Bessa, Porto
Attendance: 6,000
Referee: Frank De Bleeckere (Belgium)
9 November 2000
18:15

Roma (Italy)	1–1	(Portugal) Boavista
Nakata 9'	Report	Duda 54'

Stadio Olimpico, Rome
Attendance: 10,831
Referee: Éric Poulat (France)

Roma won 2–1 on aggregate.

26 October 2000
16:30

Tirol Innsbruck (Austria)	1–0	(Germany) VfB Stuttgart
Mair 54'	Report

Tivoli-Neu, Innsbruck
Attendance: 15,200
Referee: Pascal Garibian (France)
9 November 2000
18:00

VfB Stuttgart (Germany)	3–1	(Austria) Tirol Innsbruck
Schneider 7'; Ganea 18'; Pinto 30'	Report	Brzęczek 62'

Gottlieb-Daimler-Stadion, Stuttgart
Attendance: 11,934
Referee: Roelof Luinge (Netherlands)

VfB Stuttgart won 3–2 on aggregate.

26 October 2000
20:30

Red Star Belgrade (Federal Republic of Yugoslavia)	1–0	(Spain) Celta Vigo
Drulić 61'	Report

Red Star Stadium, Belgrade
Attendance: 43,328
Referee: Eric Romain (Belgium)
9 November 2000
21:30

Celta Vigo (Spain)	3–0 Awarded (Note: Celta Vigo originally won 5–3, but were later awarded a 3–0 victory as Red Star fielded ineligible players)	(Federal Republic of Yugoslavia) Red Star Belgrade
Catanha 22', 69'; López 49' (pen.), 70' (pen.); McCarthy 55'	Report	Drulić 14', 37', 89'

Balaídos, Vigo
Attendance: 15,165
Referee: Cosimo Bolognino (Italy)

Celta Vigo won 3–1 on aggregate.

26 October 2000
17:00

Lokomotiv Moscow (Russia)	1–0	(Slovakia) Inter Slovnaft Bratislava
Loskov 37'	Report

Dynamo Stadium, Moscow
Attendance: 2,850
Referee: Zoran Arsic (FR Yugoslavia)
9 November 2000
18:00

Inter Slovnaft Bratislava (Slovakia)	1–2	(Russia) Lokomotiv Moscow
Čišovský 47'	Report	Chugainov 31'; Janashia 68'

Štadión Pasienky, Bratislava
Attendance: 3,280
Referee: Jorge Coroado (Portugal)

Lokomotiv Moscow won 3–1 on aggregate.

26 October 2000
21:00

Basel (Switzerland)	1–2	(Netherlands) Feyenoord
Tchouga 62'	Report	Kalou 60'; Bosvelt 84'

Hardturm, Zürich
Attendance: 9,700
Referee: John Rowbotham (Scotland)
9 November 2000
20:00

Feyenoord (Netherlands)	1–0	(Switzerland) Basel
Kalou 3'	Report

De Kuip, Rotterdam
Attendance: 23,600
Referee: Yuri Baskakov (Russia)

Feyenoord won 3–1 on aggregate.

26 October 2000
21:05

Liverpool (England)	1–0	(Czech Republic) Slovan Liberec
Heskey 88'	Report

Anfield, Liverpool
Attendance: 29,662
Referee: Massimo Busacca (Switzerland)
9 November 2000
20:00

Slovan Liberec (Czech Republic)	2–3	(England) Liverpool
Štajner 9'; Breda 85'	Report	Barmby 30'; Heskey 75'; Owen 81'

Stadion U Nisy, Liberec
Attendance: 6,808
Referee: Edgar Steinborn (Germany)

Liverpool won 4–2 on aggregate.

26 October 2000
21:00

Rayo Vallecano (Spain)	1–0	(Denmark) Viborg
Quevedo 17'	Report

Estadio Teresa Rivero, Madrid
Attendance: 6,599
Referee: Dietmar Drabek (Austria)
9 November 2000
19:30

Viborg (Denmark)	2–1	(Spain) Rayo Vallecano
Fernandez 30', 86'	Report	Míchel 78'

Silkeborg Stadion, Silkeborg
Attendance: 3,460
Referee: Georgios Kasnaferis (Greece)

2–2 on aggregate; Rayo Vallecano won on away goals.

26 October 2000
19:00

Lausanne-Sports (Switzerland)	1–0	(Netherlands) Ajax
Mazzoni 37'	Report

Stade Olympique de la Pontaise, Lausanne
Attendance: 11,150
Referee: Željko Širić (Croatia)
9 November 2000
20:45

Ajax (Netherlands)	2–2	(Switzerland) Lausanne-Sports
Arveladze 17'; Van der Gun 79'	Report	Mazzoni 38'; Kuźba 77' (pen.)

Amsterdam Arena, Amsterdam
Attendance: 27,500
Referee: Víctor José Esquinas Torres (Spain)

Lausanne-Sports won 3–2 on aggregate.

26 October 2000
18:45

Nantes (France)	2–1	(Hungary) MTK Hungária
Ziani 64'; Gillet 74'	Report	Ferenczi 28'

Stade de la Beaujoire, Nantes
Attendance: 13,925
Referee: Wolfgang Stark (Germany)
9 November 2000
18:00

MTK Hungária (Hungary)	0–1	(France) Nantes
	Report	Monterrubio 88'

Hidegkuti Nándor Stadium, Budapest
Attendance: 1,537
Referee: Mikko Vuorela (Finland)

Nantes won 3–1 on aggregate.

26 October 2000
20:30

Club Brugge (Belgium)	2–1	(Switzerland) St. Gallen
Lembi 54' (pen.); Vermant 77' (pen.)	Report	Amoah 29'

Jan Breydel Stadium, Bruges
Attendance: 10,283
Referee: Ivan Dobrinov (Bulgaria)
9 November 2000
20:00

St. Gallen (Switzerland)	1–1	(Belgium) Club Brugge
Amoah 19'	Report	Mendoza 90'

Hardturm, Zürich
Attendance: 14,500
Referee: Fiorenzo Treossi (Italy)

Club Brugge won 3–2 on aggregate.

26 October 2000
19:00

Parma (Italy)	2–0	(Croatia) Dinamo Zagreb
Amoroso 61', 78'	Report

Stadio Ennio Tardini, Parma
Attendance: 4,822
Referee: Manuel Mejuto González (Spain)
9 November 2000
19:00

Dinamo Zagreb (Croatia)	1–0	(Italy) Parma
Šokota 32'	Report

Stadion Maksimir, Zagreb
Attendance: 4,894
Referee: Dermot Gallagher (England)

Parma won 2–1 on aggregate.

26 October 2000
20:00

OFI (Greece)	2–2	(Czech Republic) Slavia Prague
Kolitsidakis 41'; Mauro Silva 77'	Report	Nečas 30'; Rada 68'

Theodoros Vardinogiannis Stadium, Heraklion
Attendance: 5,600
Referee: Mario van der Ende (Netherlands)
9 November 2000
16:30

Slavia Prague (Czech Republic)	4–1	(Greece) OFI
Kuchař 62'; Zelenka 70', 88'; Digozis 71' (o.g.)	Report	Muñoz 60'

Stadion Evžena Rošického, Prague
Attendance: 4,210
Referee: Martin Ingvarsson (Sweden)

Slavia Prague won 6–3 on aggregate.

26 October 2000
14:45

Wisła Kraków (Poland)	0–0	(Portugal) Porto
	Report

Stadion Miejski in Kraków, Kraków
Attendance: 8,200
Referee: Dani Koren (Israel)
9 November 2000
22:30

Porto (Portugal)	3–0	(Poland) Wisła Kraków
Pena 4', 61'; Alenichev 90'	Report

Estádio das Antas, Porto
Attendance: 13,200
Referee: Fritz Stuchlik (Austria)

Porto won 3–0 on aggregate.
