= 2000–01 UEFA Cup final phase =

Football tournament knockout stage

The final phase of the 2000–01 UEFA Cup began on 21 November 2000 with the third round and concluded on 16 May 2001 with the final at the Westfalenstadion in Dortmund, Germany. A total of 32 teams competed in this phase of the competition.

== Qualified teams ==
The following 32 teams qualified for the final phase of the competition.

Qualified teams

Team	Notes	Coeff.
(Spain) Barcelona		103.799
(Italy) Internazionale		79.964
(Italy) Parma		78.964
(Italy) Roma		65.964
(France) Bordeaux		64.364
(Portugal) Porto		61.275
(Netherlands) Feyenoord		60.333
(Czech Republic) Slavia Prague		56.562

Team	Notes	Coeff.
(Spain) Celta Vigo		53.799
(Netherlands) PSV Eindhoven		52.333
(Norway) Rosenborg		51.050
(England) Liverpool		49.728
(Russia) Lokomotiv Moscow		48.638
(Germany) Bayer Leverkusen		48.201
(France) Nantes		46.364
(Germany) 1. FC Kaiserslautern		46.201

Team	Notes	Coeff.
(Greece) Olympiacos		45.433
(Greece) AEK Athens		43.433
(Germany) Werder Bremen		43.201
(Germany) VfB Stuttgart		42.201
(Spain) Espanyol		34.799
(Belgium) Club Brugge		32.525
(Scotland) Rangers		32.250
(Germany) Hertha BSC		32.201

Team	Notes	Coeff.
(Spain) Rayo Vallecano		29.799
(Spain) Alavés		29.799
(Germany) 1860 Munich		29.201
(Greece) PAOK		24.433
(Ukraine) Shakhtar Donetsk		15.583
(Germany) Hamburger SV		14.562
(Switzerland) Lausanne-Sports		14.500
(Croatia) Osijek		8.062

Notes

1. ^{R2} Winners from the second round
2. ^{CL} Third-placed teams from the Champions League first group stage

== Bracket ==
Third round
(Germany) Bayer Leverkusen	4	0	4
(Greece) AEK Athens	4	2	6
(Belgium) Club Brugge	0	1	1
(Spain) Barcelona	2	1	3
(Netherlands) Feyenoord	2	1	3
(Germany) VfB Stuttgart	2	2	4
(Ukraine) Shakhtar Donetsk	0	0	0
(Spain) Celta Vigo	0	1	1
(Spain) Espanyol	0	0	0
(Portugal) Porto	2	0	2
(France) Nantes	4	3	7
(Switzerland) Lausanne-Sports	3	1	4
(Italy) Roma	1	3	4
(Germany) Hamburger SV	0	0	0
(Greece) Olympiacos	2	0	2
(England) Liverpool	2	2	4
(Spain) Alavés	1	3	4
(Norway) Rosenborg	1	1	2
(Germany) Hertha BSC	0	1	1
(Italy) Internazionale	0	2	2
(Russia) Lokomotiv Moscow	0	0	0
(Spain) Rayo Vallecano	0	2	2
(France) Bordeaux	4	0	4
(Germany) Werder Bremen	1	0	1
(Croatia) Osijek	2	1	3
(Czech Republic) Slavia Prague	0	5	5
(Scotland) Rangers	1	0	1
(Germany) 1. FC Kaiserslautern	0	3	3
(Netherlands) PSV Eindhoven	3	1	4
(Greece) PAOK	0	0	0
(Italy) Parma	2	2	4
(Germany) 1860 Munich	2	0	2

Fourth round
(Greece) AEK Athens	0	0	0
(Spain) Barcelona	1	5	6
(Germany) VfB Stuttgart	0	1	1
(Spain) Celta Vigo	0	2	2
(Portugal) Porto	3	1	4
(France) Nantes	1	2	3
(Italy) Roma	0	1	1
(England) Liverpool	2	0	2
(Spain) Alavés	3	2	5
(Italy) Internazionale	3	0	3
(Spain) Rayo Vallecano	4	2	6
(France) Bordeaux	1	1	2
(Czech Republic) Slavia Prague	0	0	0
(Germany) 1. FC Kaiserslautern	0	1	1
(Netherlands) PSV Eindhoven (a)	2	2	4
(Italy) Parma	1	3	4

Quarter-finals
(Spain) Barcelona (a)	2	2	4
(Spain) Celta Vigo	1	3	4
(Portugal) Porto	0	0	0
(England) Liverpool	0	2	2
(Spain) Alavés	3	1	4
(Spain) Rayo Vallecano	0	2	2
(Germany) 1. FC Kaiserslautern	1	1	2
(Netherlands) PSV Eindhoven	0	0	0

Semi-finals
(Spain) Barcelona	0	0	0
(England) Liverpool	0	1	1
(Spain) Alavés	5	4	9
(Germany) 1. FC Kaiserslautern	1	1	2

Final
16 May – Dortmund
(England) Liverpool (g.g.)	5
(Spain) Alavés	4

== Third round ==
The third round included 24 winners from the second round as well as 8 third placed teams from the Champions League first group stage.

=== Seeding ===
UEFA allocated the teams into four groups, each with four seeded and four unseeded teams.

Group 1		Group 2		Group 3		Group 4	
Seeded	Unseeded	Seeded	Unseeded	Seeded	Unseeded	Seeded	Unseeded
(Spain) Barcelona; (Czech Republic) Slavia Prague; (Germany) Bayer Leverkusen; (Germany) 1. FC Kaiserslautern	(Greece) AEK Athens; (Belgium) Club Brugge; (Scotland) Rangers; (Croatia) Osijek	(Italy) Internazionale; (Netherlands) Feyenoord; (Norway) Rosenborg; (France) Nantes	(Germany) VfB Stuttgart; (Germany) Hertha BSC; (Spain) Alavés; (Switzerland) Lausanne-Sports	(Italy) Parma; (France) Bordeaux; (Spain) Celta Vigo; (Netherlands) PSV Eindhoven	(Germany) Werder Bremen; (Germany) 1860 Munich; (Greece) PAOK; (Ukraine) Shakhtar Donetsk	(Italy) Roma; (Portugal) Porto; (England) Liverpool; (Russia) Lokomotiv Moscow	(Greece) Olympiacos; (Spain) Espanyol; (Germany) Hamburger SV; (Spain) Rayo Vallecano

=== Summary ===
Team 1	Agg.	Team 2	1st leg	2nd leg
Hertha BSC (Germany)	1–2	(Italy) Internazionale	0–0	1–2
Parma (Italy)	4–2	(Germany) 1860 Munich	2–2	2–0
Feyenoord (Netherlands)	3–4	(Germany) VfB Stuttgart	2–2	1–2
Lokomotiv Moscow (Russia)	0–2	(Spain) Rayo Vallecano	0–0	0–2
PSV Eindhoven (Netherlands)	4–0	(Greece) PAOK	3–0	1–0
Roma (Italy)	4–0	(Germany) Hamburger SV	1–0	3–0
Nantes (France)	7–4	(Switzerland) Lausanne-Sports	4–3	3–1
Bordeaux (France)	4–1	(Germany) Werder Bremen	4–1	0–0
Olympiacos (Greece)	2–4	(England) Liverpool	2–2	0–2
Bayer Leverkusen (Germany)	4–6	(Greece) AEK Athens	4–4	0–2
Shakhtar Donetsk (Ukraine)	0–1	(Spain) Celta Vigo	0–0	0–1
Alavés (Spain)	4–2	(Norway) Rosenborg	1–1	3–1
Espanyol (Spain)	0–2	(Portugal) Porto	0–2	0–0
Osijek (Croatia)	3–5	(Czech Republic) Slavia Prague	2–0	1–5
Club Brugge (Belgium)	1–3	(Spain) Barcelona	0–2	1–1
Rangers (Scotland)	1–3	(Germany) 1. FC Kaiserslautern	1–0	0–3

=== Matches ===
21 November 2000
18:00

Hertha BSC (Germany)	0–0	(Italy) Internazionale
	Report

Olympiastadion, Berlin
Attendance: 39,100
Referee: Paul Durkin (England)
7 December 2000
20:45

Internazionale (Italy)	2–1	(Germany) Hertha BSC
Recoba 6'; Hakan Şükür 87'	Report	Tretschok 54'

San Siro, Milan
Attendance: 12,963
Referee: Lucílio Batista (Portugal)

Internazionale won 2–1 on aggregate.

23 November 2000
17:30

Parma (Italy)	2–2	(Germany) 1860 Munich
Appiah 2'; Micoud 12'	Report	Týce 79'; Beierle 89'

Stadio Ennio Tardini, Parma
Attendance: 14,000
Referee: Alain Sars (France)
5 December 2000
18:00

1860 Munich (Germany)	0–2	(Italy) Parma
	Report	Amoroso 74' (pen.); Conceição 87'

Olympic Stadium, Munich
Attendance: 28,600
Referee: Leslie Irvine (Northern Ireland)

Parma won 4–2 on aggregate.

23 November 2000
20:00

Feyenoord (Netherlands)	2–2	(Germany) VfB Stuttgart
Tomasson 10'; Leonardo 45'	Report	Dundee 36'; Ganea 76'

De Kuip, Rotterdam
Attendance: 30,000
Referee: Manuel Mejuto González (Spain)
5 December 2000
16:00

VfB Stuttgart (Germany)	2–1	(Netherlands) Feyenoord
Meißner 29'; Balakov 90' (pen.)	Report	Paauwe 71'

Gottlieb-Daimler-Stadion, Stuttgart
Attendance: 15,000
Referee: Graziano Cesari (Italy)

VfB Stuttgart won 4–3 on aggregate.

23 November 2000
16:30

Lokomotiv Moscow (Russia)	0–0	(Spain) Rayo Vallecano
	Report

Dynamo Stadium, Moscow
Attendance: 6,716
Referee: Luc Huyghe (Belgium)
7 December 2000
20:45

Rayo Vallecano (Spain)	2–0	(Russia) Lokomotiv Moscow
Bolić 64'; Alcázar 66'	Report

Estadio Teresa Rivero, Madrid
Attendance: 7,844
Referee: Sorin Corpodean (Romania)

Rayo Vallecano won 2–0 on aggregate.

23 November 2000
19:30

PSV Eindhoven (Netherlands)	3–0	(Greece) PAOK
Bruggink 5'; Kežman 15', 45'	Report

Philips Stadion, Eindhoven
Attendance: 28,000
Referee: Alfredo Trentalange (Italy)
7 December 2000
20:15

PAOK (Greece)	0–1	(Netherlands) PSV Eindhoven
	Report	Bruggink 43'

Toumba Stadium, Thessaloniki
Attendance: 12,691
Referee: Stuart Dougal (Scotland)

PSV Eindhoven won 4–0 on aggregate.

23 November 2000
20:45

Roma (Italy)	1–0	(Germany) Hamburger SV
Guigou 33'	Report

Stadio Olimpico, Rome
Attendance: 42,705
Referee: Alain Hamer (Luxembourg)
7 December 2000
20:00

Hamburger SV (Germany)	0–3	(Italy) Roma
	Report	Aldair 27'; Delvecchio 59'; Samuel 60'

HSH Nordbank Arena, Hamburg
Attendance: 48,500
Referee: Jan Wegereef (Netherlands)

Roma won 4–0 on aggregate.

23 November 2000
19:15

Nantes (France)	4–3	(Switzerland) Lausanne-Sports
Moldovan 18'; Monterrubio 43'; Puce 73' (o.g.); Gillet 86'	Report	Kuźba 41' (pen.), 70'; Mazzoni 53'

Stade de la Beaujoire, Nantes
Attendance: 18,000
Referee: Atanas Uzunov (Bulgaria)
7 December 2000
20:15

Lausanne-Sports (Switzerland)	1–3	(France) Nantes
Lombardo 49'	Report	Ziani 24'; Moldovan 59'; Carrière 88'

Stade Olympique de la Pontaise, Lausanne
Attendance: 14,200
Referee: Roelof Luinge (Netherlands)

Nantes won 7–4 on aggregate.

23 November 2000
21:00

Bordeaux (France)	4–1	(Germany) Werder Bremen
Dugarry 23'; Batlles 39'; Wilmots 66', 75'	Report	Pizarro 16'

Parc Lescure, Bordeaux
Attendance: 16,000
Referee: Valentin Ivanov (Russia)
7 December 2000
18:00

Werder Bremen (Germany)	0–0	(France) Bordeaux
	Report

Weserstadion, Bremen
Attendance: 16,166
Referee: Oğuz Sarvan (Turkey)

Bordeaux won 4–1 on aggregate.

23 November 2000
20:05

Olympiacos (Greece)	2–2	(England) Liverpool
Alexandris 65', 90'	Report	Barmby 38'; Gerrard 66'

Olympic Stadium, Athens
Attendance: 43,855
Referee: René Temmink (Netherlands)
7 December 2000
21:05

Liverpool (England)	2–0	(Greece) Olympiacos
Heskey 28'; Barmby 60'	Report

Anfield, Liverpool
Attendance: 35,484
Referee: Vítor Melo Pereira (Portugal)

Liverpool won 4–2 on aggregate.

23 November 2000
19:15

Bayer Leverkusen (Germany)	4–4	(Greece) AEK Athens
Kirsten 24', 43'; Kovač 48'; Ramelow 90'	Report	Lakis 5'; Navas 46', 79'; Tsiartas 55' (pen.)

BayArena, Leverkusen
Attendance: 22,500
Referee: Terje Hauge (Norway)
7 December 2000
14:00

AEK Athens (Greece)	2–0	(Germany) Bayer Leverkusen
Navas 16'; Tsiartas 50'	Report

Nikos Goumas Stadium, Nea Filadelfeia
Attendance: 20,700
Referee: Arturo Daudén Ibáñez (Spain)

AEK Athens won 6–4 on aggregate.

23 November 2000
19:30

Shakhtar Donetsk (Ukraine)	0–0	(Spain) Celta Vigo
	Report

Shakhtar Stadium, Donetsk
Attendance: 29,054
Referee: Rune Pedersen (Norway)
7 December 2000
21:45

Celta Vigo (Spain)	1–0	(Ukraine) Shakhtar Donetsk
Catanha 28'	Report

Balaídos, Vigo
Attendance: 15,000
Referee: Günter Benkö (Austria)

Celta Vigo won 1–0 on aggregate.

23 November 2000
20:30

Alavés (Spain)	1–1	(Norway) Rosenborg
Javi Moreno 56'	Report	Johnsen 79'

Mendizorrotza Stadium, Vitoria-Gasteiz
Attendance: 9,920
Referee: Hartmut Strampe (Germany)
7 December 2000
19:00

Rosenborg (Norway)	1–3	(Spain) Alavés
Skammelsrud 89' (pen.)	Report	B. Johnsen 20' (o.g.); Vučko 37'; Javi Moreno 61'

Lerkendal Stadion, Trondheim
Attendance: 9,560
Referee: Stéphane Bré (France)

Alavés won 4–2 on aggregate.

23 November 2000
21:15

Espanyol (Spain)	0–2	(Portugal) Porto
	Report	Drulović 47'; Pena 71'

Estadi Olímpic de Montjuïc, Barcelona
Attendance: 15,800
Referee: Kyros Vassaras (Greece)
7 December 2000
22:30

Porto (Portugal)	0–0	(Spain) Espanyol
	Report

Estádio das Antas, Porto
Attendance: 9,500
Referee: Karl-Erik Nilsson (Sweden)

Porto won 2–0 on aggregate.

23 November 2000
17:30

Osijek (Croatia)	2–0	(Czech Republic) Slavia Prague
Turković 33'; Neretljak 82'	Report

Stadion Gradski vrt, Osijek
Attendance: 15,270
Referee: Michel Piraux (Belgium)
7 December 2000
19:00

Slavia Prague (Czech Republic)	5–1	(Croatia) Osijek
Došek 15', 53'; Zelenka 29'; Švancara 90'; Kuchař 90'	Report	Turković 45'

Strahov Stadium, Prague
Attendance: 4,215
Referee: Dermot Gallagher (England)

Slavia Prague won 5–3 on aggregate.

23 November 2000
20:30

Club Brugge (Belgium)	0–2	(Spain) Barcelona
	Report	Rivaldo 24'; Kluivert 30'

Jan Breydel Stadium, Bruges
Attendance: 27,624
Referee: Konrad Plautz (Austria)
7 December 2000
20:45

Barcelona (Spain)	1–1	(Belgium) Club Brugge
Rivaldo 17' (pen.)	Report	Verheyen 26'

Camp Nou, Barcelona
Attendance: 35,000
Referee: Herbert Fandel (Germany)

Barcelona won 3–1 on aggregate.

30 November 2000
20:30

Rangers (Scotland)	1–0	(Germany) 1. FC Kaiserslautern
Albertz 88'	Report

Ibrox Stadium, Glasgow
Attendance: 47,279
Referee: Gilles Veissière (France)
7 December 2000
16:00

1. FC Kaiserslautern (Germany)	3–0	(Scotland) Rangers
Klose 8'; Buck 65'; Lokvenc 79'	Report

Fritz-Walter-Stadion, Kaiserslautern
Attendance: 28,757
Referee: Knud Erik Fisker (Denmark)

1. FC Kaiserslautern won 3–1 on aggregate.

== Fourth round ==
=== Seeding ===
UEFA allocated the teams into two groups, each with four seeded and four unseeded teams.

Group 1		Group 2	
Seeded	Unseeded	Seeded	Unseeded
(Spain) Barcelona; (Italy) Roma; (Portugal) Porto; (Spain) Celta Vigo	(England) Liverpool; (France) Nantes; (Greece) AEK Athens; (Germany) VfB Stuttgart	(Italy) Internazionale; (Italy) Parma; (France) Bordeaux; (Czech Republic) Slavia Prague	(Netherlands) PSV Eindhoven; (Germany) 1. FC Kaiserslautern; (Spain) Alavés; (Spain) Rayo Vallecano

=== Summary ===
Team 1	Agg.	Team 2	1st leg	2nd leg
Slavia Prague (Czech Republic)	0–1	(Germany) 1. FC Kaiserslautern	0–0	0–1
VfB Stuttgart (Germany)	1–2	(Spain) Celta Vigo	0–0	1–2
PSV Eindhoven (Netherlands)	4–4 (a)	(Italy) Parma	2–1	2–3
AEK Athens (Greece)	0–6	(Spain) Barcelona	0–1	0–5
Alavés (Spain)	5–3	(Italy) Internazionale	3–3	2–0
Porto (Portugal)	4–3	(France) Nantes	3–1	1–2
Rayo Vallecano (Spain)	6–2	(France) Bordeaux	4–1	2–1
Roma (Italy)	1–2	(England) Liverpool	0–2	1–0

=== Matches ===
15 February 2001
18:15

Slavia Prague (Czech Republic)	0–0	(Germany) 1. FC Kaiserslautern
	Report

Strahov Stadium, Prague
Attendance: 17,840
Referee: Eric Romain (France)
22 February 2001
20:30

1. FC Kaiserslautern (Germany)	1–0	(Czech Republic) Slavia Prague
Lokvenc 59'	Report

Fritz-Walter-Stadion, Kaiserslautern
Attendance: 23,596
Referee: Valentin Ivanov (Russia)

1. FC Kaiserslautern won 1–0 on aggregate.

15 February 2001
20:30

VfB Stuttgart (Germany)	0–0	(Spain) Celta Vigo
	Report

Gottlieb-Daimler-Stadion, Stuttgart
Attendance: 18,000
Referee: Hugh Dallas (Scotland)
22 February 2001
22:00

Celta Vigo (Spain)	2–1	(Germany) VfB Stuttgart
Karpin 6'; Mostovoi 85'	Report	Blank 45'

Balaídos, Vigo
Attendance: 19,000
Referee: Pierluigi Collina (Italy)

Celta Vigo won 2–1 on aggregate.

15 February 2001
20:00

PSV Eindhoven (Netherlands)	2–1	(Italy) Parma
Ooijer 24'; Rommedahl 73'	Report	Mboma 67'

Philips Stadion, Eindhoven
Attendance: 31,000
Referee: Kyros Vassaras (Greece)
22 February 2001
19:15

Parma (Italy)	3–2	(Netherlands) PSV Eindhoven
Milošević 64' (pen.), 69'; Montaño 90'	Report	Rommedahl 32'; Kežman 45'

Stadio Ennio Tardini, Parma
Attendance: 11,883
Referee: Claude Colombo (France)

4–4 on aggregate; PSV Eindhoven won on away goals.

15 February 2001
20:30

AEK Athens (Greece)	0–1	(Spain) Barcelona
	Report	Luis Enrique 41'

Nikos Goumas Stadium, Nea Filadelfeia
Attendance: 24,404
Referee: Graham Poll (England)
22 February 2001
21:00

Barcelona (Spain)	5–0	(Greece) AEK Athens
Luis Enrique 22', 31', 60'; Rivaldo 57'; Gerard 87' (pen.)	Report

Camp Nou, Barcelona
Attendance: 33,623
Referee: Stefano Braschi (Italy)

Barcelona won 6–0 on aggregate.

15 February 2001
19:30

Alavés (Spain)	3–3	(Italy) Internazionale
Moreno 44'; Téllez 70'; Alonso 73'	Report	Recoba 45+1', 51'; Vieri 65'

Estadio Mendizorrotza, Vitoria
Attendance: 17,307
Referee: Alain Hamer (Luxembourg)
22 February 2001
21:00

Internazionale (Italy)	0–2	(Spain) Alavés
	Report	Cruyff 78'; Tomić 83'

San Siro, Milan
Attendance: 9,845
Referee: Graham Barber (England)

Alavés won 5–3 on aggregate.

15 February 2001
22:30

Porto (Portugal)	3–1	(France) Nantes
Esquerdinha 16' (pen.); Gillet 59' (o.g.); Secretário 85'	Report	Ahamada 14'

Estádio das Antas, Porto
Attendance: 22,100
Referee: Konrad Plautz (Austria)
22 February 2001
20:45

Nantes (France)	2–1	(Portugal) Porto
Vahirua 69'; Armand 74'	Report	Pena 35'

Stade de la Beaujoire, Nantes
Attendance: 29,000
Referee: Juan Fernández Marín (Spain)

Porto won 4–3 on aggregate.

15 February 2001
20:45

Rayo Vallecano (Spain)	4–1	(France) Bordeaux
De Quintana 19'; Bolić 73'; Quevedo 82'; Míchel 90'	Report	Laslandes 2'

Estadio Teresa Rivero, Madrid
Attendance: 5,468
Referee: Domenico Messina (Italy)
22 February 2001
19:00

Bordeaux (France)	1–2	(Spain) Rayo Vallecano
Mingo 24' (o.g.)	Report	Cembranos 20' (pen.); Bolo 50'

Parc Lescure, Bordeaux
Attendance: 16,017
Referee: Stuart Dougal (Scotland)

Rayo Vallecano won 6–2 on aggregate.

15 February 2001
21:00

Roma (Italy)	0–2	(England) Liverpool
	Report	Owen 46', 72'

Stadio Olimpico, Rome
Attendance: 59,718
Referee: Markus Merk (Germany)
22 February 2001
21:05

Liverpool (England)	0–1	(Italy) Roma
	Report	Guigou 70'

Anfield, Liverpool
Attendance: 43,688
Referee: José María García-Aranda (Spain)

Liverpool won 2–1 on aggregate.

== Quarter-finals ==
=== Summary ===
Team 1	Agg.	Team 2	1st leg	2nd leg
Barcelona (Spain)	4–4 (a)	(Spain) Celta Vigo	2–1	2–3
Porto (Portugal)	0–2	(England) Liverpool	0–0	0–2
Alavés (Spain)	4–2	(Spain) Rayo Vallecano	3–0	1–2
1. FC Kaiserslautern (Germany)	2–0	(Netherlands) PSV Eindhoven	1–0	1–0

=== Matches ===
8 March 2001
21:00

Barcelona (Spain)	2–1	(Spain) Celta Vigo
Kluivert 13', 56'	Report	Coira 69'

Camp Nou, Barcelona
Attendance: 42,593
Referee: Graham Barber (England)
15 March 2001
21:00

Celta Vigo (Spain)	3–2	(Spain) Barcelona
Catanha 34'; López 64' (pen.); Mostovoi 90'	Report	Rivaldo 29', 44'

Balaídos, Vigo
Attendance: 25,500
Referee: Markus Merk (Germany)

4–4 on aggregate; Barcelona won on away goals.

8 March 2001
21:05

Porto (Portugal)	0–0	(England) Liverpool
	Report

Estádio das Antas, Porto
Attendance: 21,502
Referee: Pierluigi Collina (Italy)
15 March 2001
21:05

Liverpool (England)	2–0	(Portugal) Porto
Murphy 32'; Owen 38'	Report

Anfield, Liverpool
Attendance: 40,052
Referee: Kim Milton Nielsen (Denmark)

Liverpool won 2–0 on aggregate.

8 March 2001
21:00

Alavés (Spain)	3–0	(Spain) Rayo Vallecano
Azkoitia 30'; Eggen 79'; Vučko 80'	Report

Mendizorrotza Stadium, Vitoria-Gasteiz
Attendance: 12,352
Referee: Jan Wegereef (Netherlands)
15 March 2001
21:00

Rayo Vallecano (Spain)	2–1	(Spain) Alavés
Quevedo 41'; Cembranos 80'	Report	Cruyff 19'

Estadio Teresa Rivero, Madrid
Attendance: 7,100
Referee: Claude Colombo (France)

Alavés won 4–2 on aggregate.

8 March 2001
20:30

1. FC Kaiserslautern (Germany)	1–0	(Netherlands) PSV Eindhoven
Koch 31' (pen.)	Report

Fritz-Walter-Stadion, Kaiserslautern
Attendance: 23,851
Referee: Graham Poll (England)
15 March 2001
20:30 (Note: The PSV Eindhoven v 1. FC Kaiserslautern match was interrupted for 16 minutes due to supporter disturbances.)

PSV Eindhoven (Netherlands)	0–1	(Germany) 1. FC Kaiserslautern
	Report	Basler 71' (pen.)

Philips Stadion, Eindhoven
Attendance: 31,000
Referee: Antonio Jesús López Nieto (Spain)

1. FC Kaiserslautern won 2–0 on aggregate.

== Semi-finals ==
=== Summary ===
Team 1	Agg.	Team 2	1st leg	2nd leg
Alavés (Spain)	9–2	(Germany) 1. FC Kaiserslautern	5–1	4–1
Barcelona (Spain)	0–1	(England) Liverpool	0–0	0–1

=== Matches ===
5 April 2001
21:15

Alavés (Spain)	5–1	(Germany) 1. FC Kaiserslautern
Contra 20' (pen.), 31' (pen.); Cruyff 42'; Alonso 57' (pen.); Mocelin 81'	Report	Koch 68' (pen.)

Mendizorrotza Stadium, Vitoria-Gasteiz
Attendance: 15,157
Referee: Rune Pedersen (Norway)
19 April 2001
20:30

1. FC Kaiserslautern (Germany)	1–4	(Spain) Alavés
Djorkaeff 7'	Report	Alonso 23'; Vučko 64', 86'; Gañán 88'

Fritz-Walter-Stadion, Kaiserslautern
Attendance: 29,800
Referee: Hugh Dallas (Scotland)

Alavés won 9–2 on aggregate.

5 April 2001
21:15

Barcelona (Spain)	0–0	(England) Liverpool
	Report

Camp Nou, Barcelona
Attendance: 90,832
Referee: Hellmut Krug (Germany)
19 April 2001
20:05

Liverpool (England)	1–0	(Spain) Barcelona
McAllister 44' (pen.)	Report

Anfield, Liverpool
Attendance: 44,203
Referee: Urs Meier (Switzerland)

Liverpool won 1–0 on aggregate.

== Final ==
The final was played on 16 May 2001 at the Westfalenstadion in Dortmund, Germany.

16 May 2001
20:45 UTC+2

Liverpool (England)	5–4 (a.e.t./g.g.)	(Spain) Alavés
Babbel 3'; Gerrard 16'; McAllister 40' (pen.); Fowler 72'; Geli 116' (o.g.)	Report	Alonso 26'; Moreno 47', 49'; Cruyff 88'

Westfalenstadion, Dortmund
Attendance: 48,050
Referee: Gilles Veissière (France)
