= Cupák =

Cupák (feminine: Cupáková) is a Czech surname. Notable people with the surname include:

- David Cupák (born 1989), Czech futsal and football player
- Marcel Cupák (1973–2025), Czech football player
- Miriam Bobková, married Cupáková (born 1979), Slovak athlete
