= 2000–01 UEFA Cup =

30th season of Europe's secondary club football tournament organised by UEFA

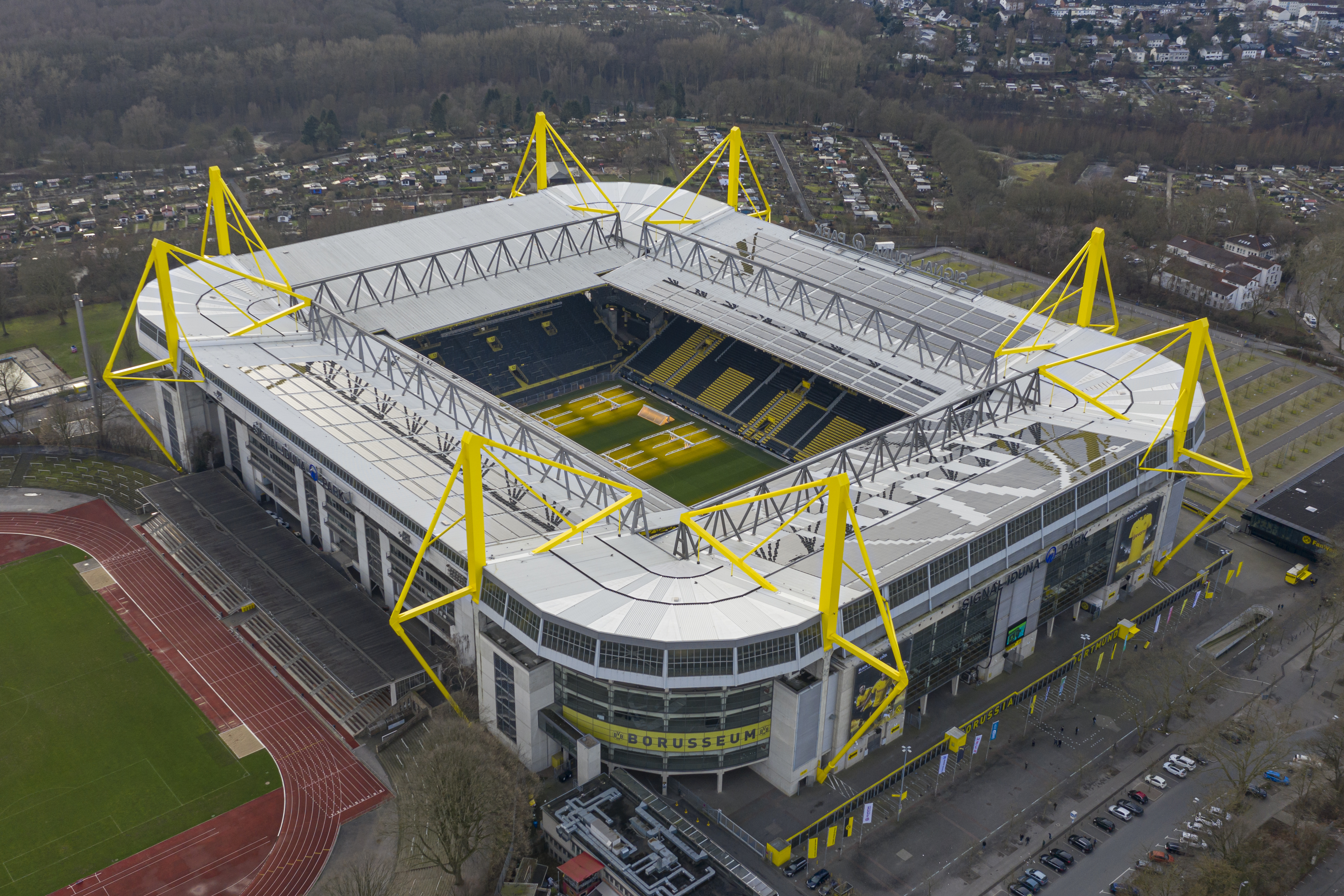
- Westfalenstadion in Dortmund hosted the final.
- Dates: 8 August 2000 – 16 May 2001

Final positions
- Champions: (England) Liverpool (3rd title)
- Runners-up: (Spain) Alavés

Tournament statistics
- Matches played: 205
- Goals scored: 566 (2.76 per match)
- Top scorer(s): Goran Drulić (Red Star Belgrade); Javi Moreno (Alavés); Marcin Kuźba (Lausanne-Sports); Demis Nikolaidis (AEK Athens); 6 goals each

The 2000–01 UEFA Cup was the 30th edition of the UEFA Cup competition. Liverpool won the final with a golden goal in extra-time against Alavés for their third title in the competition. It completed a cup treble for the club, as they also won the FA Cup and the League Cup that season. The conclusion of the tournament by a golden goal is the only instance in any of the major European club cup competitions until the abolition of the rule in 2002.

Galatasaray could not defend their title as they automatically qualified for the 2000–01 UEFA Champions League and also reached the knockout stage.

English clubs had been banned from European competitions between 1985 and 1990 as a result of the Heysel disaster, and Liverpool were the first English side of the post-Heysel era to win the trophy. The previous English winners were Tottenham Hotspur in 1984. It was also Liverpool's first European trophy of the post-Heysel era.

== Association team allocation ==
A total of 145 teams from 51 UEFA associations participated in the 2000–01 UEFA Cup. Associations are allocated places according to their 1999 UEFA league coefficient.

Below is the qualification scheme for the 2000–01 UEFA Cup:

- Associations 1–6 each enter three teams
- Associations 7–8 each enter four teams
- Associations 9–15 each enter two teams
- Associations 16–21 each enter three teams
- Associations 22–49 each enter two teams, with the exception of Liechtenstein who enter one.
- Associations 50-51 each enter one team
- The top three associations of the 1999–2000 UEFA Fair Play ranking each gain an additional berth
- 16 teams eliminated from the 2000–01 UEFA Champions League are transferred to the UEFA Cup
- 8 teams eliminated from the group stage of the 2000–01 UEFA Champions League are transferred to the UEFA Cup
- 3 winners of the Intertoto Cup
- The winner of the 1999–2000 UEFA Cup (not used due to Galatasaray's qualification to Champions League)

=== Association ranking ===
Rank	Association	Coeff.	Teams	Notes
1	Italy	57.212	3	+1(UCL) +1(IT)
2	Spain	49.628	3	+1(UCL) +1(FP) +1(IT)
3	Germany	45.498	3	+3(UCL) +1(IT)
4	France	41.442	3	
5	Netherlands	37.816	3	+2(UCL)
6	England	34.288	3	
7	Russia	27.825	4	+1(UCL)
8	Greece	26.950	4	+1(UCL)
9	Portugal	24.716	2	+1(UCL)
10	Czech Republic	23.624	2	+1(UCL)
11	Austria	22.375	2	+1(UCL)
12	Denmark	21.050	2	+2(UCL)
13	Croatia	20.374	2	+1(UCL)
14	Turkey	20.350	2	
15	Ukraine	20.291	2	+1(UCL)
16	Switzerland	20.000	3	+1(UCL)
17	Norway	19.733	3	+1(UCL)
18	Belgium	19.600	3	+1(FP)

Rank	Association	Coeff.	Teams	Notes
19	Sweden	17.325	3	+1(FP)
20	Poland	17.250	3	+1(UCL)
21	Scotland	16.625	3	+1(UCL)
22	Romania	16.200	2	
23	Hungary	15.666	2	+1(UCL)
24	Slovakia	14.332	2	+1(UCL)
25	Cyprus	12.665	2	
26	Georgia	12.166	2	
27	Israel	11.541	2	
28	Slovenia	10.831	2	
29	Belarus	9.083	2	
30	Finland	9.041	2	
31	FR Yugoslavia	8.249	2	+1(UCL)
32	Bulgaria	7.582	2	
33	Latvia	6.582	2	
34	Iceland	6.332	2	
35	Macedonia	4.915	2	
36	Lithuania	4.832	2	

Rank	Association	Coeff.	Teams	Notes
37	Moldova	4.333	2	+1(UCL)
38	Estonia	2.582	2	
39	Armenia	2.416	2	
40	Northern Ireland	1.998	2	
41	Republic of Ireland	1.832	2	
42	Wales	1.832	2	
43	Malta	1.498	2	
44	Faroe Islands	1.249	2	
45	Albania	1.166	2	
46	Luxembourg	1.166	2	
47	Liechtenstein	1.000	1	
48	Azerbaijan	0.916	2	
49	Bosnia and Herzegovina	0.500	2	
50	Andorra	0.000	1	
51	San Marino	0.000	1	

Notes

- (FP): Additional fair play berth (Norway, Denmark, Scotland)
- (UCL): Additional teams transferred from the UEFA Champions League
- (IT): Additional teams from Intertoto Cup

=== Distribution ===
	Teams entering in this round	Teams advancing from previous round	Teams transferred from Champions League
Qualifying round (82 teams)	31 domestic cup winners from associations 19–49; 33 domestic league runners-up from associations 16–49; 13 domestic league third-placed teams from associations 9–21; 3 teams from the Fair Play rankings; 2 domestic league champions teams from Andorra and San Marino		
First round (96 teams)	18 domestic cup winners from associations 1–18; 2 domestic league third-placed teams from associations 7–8; 5 domestic league fourth-placed teams from associations 4–8; 8 domestic league fifth-placed teams from associations 1–8; 3 domestic league sixth-placed teams from associations 1–3; 3 winners of the Intertoto Cup	41 winners from the qualifying round	16 losing teams from Champions League qualifying
Second round (48 teams)		48 winners from the first round	
Third round (32 teams)		24 winners from the second round	8 third placed teams from the Champions League first group stage
Fourth round (16 teams)		16 winners from the third round	
Play-offs (8 teams)		8 winners from the fourth round play the quarter-finals, semi-finals and final	

=== Redistribution rules ===
A UEFA Cup place is vacated when a team qualify for both the Champions League and the UEFA Cup, or qualify for the UEFA Cup by more than one method. When a place is vacated, it is redistributed within the national association by the following rules:

- When the domestic cup winners (considered as the "highest-placed" qualifier within the national association) also qualify for the Champions League, their UEFA Cup place is vacated, and the remaining UEFA Cup qualifiers are moved up one place, with the final place (with the earliest starting round) taken by the domestic cup runners-up, provided they do not already qualify for the Champions League or the UEFA Cup. Otherwise, this place is taken by the highest-placed league finisher which do not qualify for the UEFA Cup yet.
- When the domestic cup winners also qualify for the UEFA Cup through league position, their place through the league position is vacated, and the UEFA Cup qualifiers which finish lower in the league are moved up one place, with the final place taken by the highest-placed league finisher which do not qualify for the UEFA Cup yet.
- A place vacated by the League Cup winners is taken by the highest-placed league finisher which do not qualify for the UEFA Cup yet.
- A Fair Play place is taken by the highest-ranked team in the domestic Fair Play table which do not qualify for the Champions League or UEFA Cup yet.

=== Teams ===
The labels in the parentheses show how each team qualified for the place of its starting round:

- CW: Cup winners
- CR: Cup runners-up
- LC: League Cup winners
- Nth: League position
- FP: Fair play
- IC: Intertoto Cup winners
- CL: Relegated from the Champions League
  - GS: Third-placed teams from the group stage
  - Q3: Losers from the third qualifying round

Third round
(Spain) Barcelona (CL GS)	(Germany) Hamburger SV (CL GS)	(Greece) Olympiacos (CL GS)	(Norway) Rosenborg (CL GS)
(Germany) Bayer Leverkusen (CL GS)	(Netherlands) PSV Eindhoven (CL GS)	(Ukraine) Shakhtar Donetsk (CL GS)	(Scotland) Rangers (CL GS)
First round
(Italy) Parma (5th)	(Netherlands) Ajax (5th)	(Austria) GAK (CW)	(Austria) Tirol Innsbruck (CL Q3)
(Italy) Roma (6th)	(England) Chelsea (CW)	(Denmark) Viborg (CW)	(Denmark) Herfølge (CL Q3)
(Italy) Fiorentina (7th)	(England) Liverpool (4th)	(Croatia) Osijek (3rd)	(Denmark) Brøndby (CL Q3)
(Spain) Espanyol (CW)	(England) Leicester City (LC)	(Turkey) Gaziantepspor (3rd)	(Croatia) Dinamo Zagreb (CL Q3)
(Spain) Zaragoza (4th)	(Russia) CSKA Moscow (3rd)	(Ukraine) Kryvbas Kryvyi Rih (3rd)	(Switzerland) St. Gallen (CL Q3)
(Spain) Alavés (6th)	(Russia) Torpedo Moscow (4th)	(Switzerland) Zürich (CW)	(Poland) Polonia Warsaw (CL Q3)
(Germany) 1. FC Kaiserslautern (5th)	(Russia) Dynamo Moscow (5th)	(Norway) Molde (2nd)	(Hungary) Dunaferr (CL Q3)
(Germany) Hertha BSC (6th)	(Russia) Alania Vladikavkaz (6th)	(Belgium) Genk (CW)	(Slovakia) Inter Slovnaft Bratislava (CL Q3)
(Germany) Werder Bremen (CR)	(Greece) AEK Athens (CW)	(Italy) Internazionale (CL Q3)	(Federal Republic of Yugoslavia) Red Star Belgrade (CL Q3)
(France) Nantes (CW)	(Greece) OFI (4th)	(Germany) 1860 Munich (CL Q3)	(Moldova) Zimbru Chișinău (CL Q3)
(France) Bordeaux (4th)	(Greece) PAOK (5th)	(Netherlands) Feyenoord (CL Q3)	(Italy) Udinese (IC)
(France) Gueugnon (LC)	(Greece) Iraklis (6th)	(Russia) Lokomotiv Moscow (CL Q3)	(Spain) Celta Vigo (IC)
(Netherlands) Roda JC (CW)	(Portugal) Benfica (3rd)	(Portugal) Porto (CL Q3)	(Germany) VfB Stuttgart (IC)
(Netherlands) Vitesse (4th)	(Czech Republic) Slovan Liberec (CW)	(Czech Republic) Slavia Prague (CL Q3)	
Qualifying round
(Portugal) Boavista (4th)	(Scotland) Aberdeen (CR)	(Bulgaria) CSKA Sofia (2nd)	(Wales) Bangor City (CW)
(Czech Republic) Drnovice (3rd)	(Romania) Rapid București (2nd)	(Bulgaria) Neftochimic Burgas (CR)	(Wales) Barry Town (2nd)
(Austria) Rapid Wien (3rd)	(Romania) Universitatea Craiova (CR)	(Latvia) Liepājas Metalurgs (2nd)	(Malta) Sliema Wanderers (CW)
(Denmark) AB (3rd)	(Hungary) MTK Hungária (CW)	(Latvia) Ventspils (3rd)	(Malta) Valletta (3rd)
(Croatia) Rijeka (4th)	(Hungary) Vasas (3rd)	(Iceland) ÍBV (2nd)	(Faroe Islands) GÍ (2nd)
(Turkey) Antalyaspor (CR)	(Slovakia) Košice (2nd)	(Iceland) ÍA (CR)	(Faroe Islands) B36 (CR)
(Ukraine) Vorskla Poltava (4th)	(Slovakia) Slovan Bratislava (3rd)	(North Macedonia) Pobeda (2nd)	(Albania) Teuta (CW)
(Switzerland) Lausanne-Sports (2nd)	(Cyprus) Omonia (CW)	(North Macedonia) Rabotnicki (3rd)	(Albania) Tomori (2nd)
(Switzerland) Basel (3rd)	(Cyprus) APOEL (3rd)	(Lithuania) Ekranas (CW)	(Luxembourg) Jeunesse Esch (CW)
(Norway) Brann (3rd)	(Georgia (country)) Locomotive Tbilisi (CW)	(Lithuania) Žalgiris (2nd)	(Luxembourg) Grevenmacher (2nd)
(Norway) Lillestrøm (4th)	(Georgia (country)) WIT Georgia (2nd)	(Moldova) Constructorul Chișinău (CW)	(Liechtenstein) Vaduz (CW)
(Belgium) Club Brugge (2nd)	(Israel) Maccabi Haifa (2nd)	(Moldova) Sheriff Tiraspol (2nd)	(Azerbaijan) Kapaz (CW)
(Belgium) Gent (3rd)	(Israel) Beitar Jerusalem (CR)	(Estonia) Viljandi Tulevik (2nd)	(Azerbaijan) Neftçi (3rd)
(Sweden) Örgryte IS (CW)	(Slovenia) Olimpija Ljubljana (CW)	(Estonia) Flora (3rd)	(Bosnia and Herzegovina) Željezničar (CW)
(Sweden) AIK (2nd)	(Slovenia) HIT Gorica (2nd)	(Armenia) Mika (CW)	(Bosnia and Herzegovina) Budućnost Banovići (2nd)
(Sweden) Halmstads BK (3rd)	(Belarus) Slavia Mozyr (CW)	(Armenia) Ararat Yerevan (2nd)	(Andorra) Constel·lació (1st)
(Poland) Amica Wronki (CW)	(Belarus) Gomel (3rd)	(Northern Ireland) Glentoran (CW)	(San Marino) Folgore (1st)
(Poland) Wisła Kraków (2nd)	(Finland) Jokerit (CW)	(Northern Ireland) Coleraine (2nd)	(Sweden) IFK Norrköping (FP)
(Poland) Ruch Chorzów (3rd)	(Finland) HJK (2nd)	(Republic of Ireland) Cork City (2nd)	(Spain) Rayo Vallecano (FP)
(Scotland) Celtic (2nd)	(Federal Republic of Yugoslavia) Partizan (2nd)	(Republic of Ireland) Bohemians (3rd)	(Belgium) Lierse (FP)
(Scotland) Heart of Midlothian (3rd)	(Federal Republic of Yugoslavia) Napredak Kruševac (CR)		

== Round and draw dates ==
The schedule of the competition was as follows. Matches were generally scheduled for Thursdays apart from the final, which took place on a Wednesday, though exceptionally could take place on Tuesdays or Wednesdays due to scheduling conflicts.

Schedule for 2000–01 UEFA Cup
Round	Draw date	First leg	Second leg
Qualifying round	23 June 2000	10 August 2000	24 August 2000
First round	25 August 2000	14 September 2000	28 September 2000
Second round	29 September 2000	26 October 2000	9 November 2000
Third round	10 November 2000	23 November 2000	7 December 2000
Fourth round	13 December 2000	15 February 2001	22 February 2001
Quarter-finals	13 December 2000	8 March 2001	15 March 2001
Semi-finals	16 March 2001	5 April 2001	19 April 2001
Final	16 March 2001	16 May 2001 at Westfalenstadion, Dortmund	

== Qualifying round ==
Team 1	Agg.	Team 2	1st leg	2nd leg
Universitatea Craiova (Romania)	1–2	(North Macedonia) Pobeda	1–1	0–1
Folgore (San Marino)	1–12	(Switzerland) Basel	1–5	0–7
Neftçi (Azerbaijan)	2–3	(Slovenia) HIT Gorica	1–0	1–3
Rapid Wien (Austria)	6–0	(Albania) Teuta	2–0	4–0
Club Brugge (Belgium)	6–1	(Estonia) Flora	4–1	2–0
ÍBV (Iceland)	0–5	(Scotland) Heart of Midlothian	0–2	0–3
AB (Denmark)	9–0	(Faroe Islands) B36	8–0	1–0
Coleraine (Northern Ireland)	1–3	(Sweden) Örgryte IS	1–2	0–1
Ararat Yerevan (Armenia)	3–4	(Slovakia) Košice	2–3	1–1
Napredak Kruševac (Federal Republic of Yugoslavia)	6–2	(Estonia) Viljandi Tulevik	5–1	1–1
MTK Hungária (Hungary)	5–2	(Finland) Jokerit	1–0	4–2
Vorskla Poltava (Ukraine)	4–0	(North Macedonia) Rabotnicki	2–0	2–0
ÍA (Iceland)	2–6	(Belgium) Gent	2–3	0–3
Bangor City (Wales)	0–11	(Sweden) Halmstads BK	0–7	0–4
Ventspils (Latvia)	3–4	(Hungary) Vasas	2–1	1–3 (a.e.t.)
Jeunesse Esch (Luxembourg)	0–11	(Scotland) Celtic	0–4	0–7
Drnovice (Czech Republic)	4–0	(Bosnia and Herzegovina) Budućnost Banovići	3–0	1–0
Tomori (Albania)	2–5	(Cyprus) APOEL	2–3	0–2
Rapid București (Romania)	3–1	(Armenia) Mika	3–0	0–1
WIT Georgia (Georgia (country))	1–4	(Israel) Beitar Jerusalem	0–3	1–1
Omonia (Cyprus)	1–2	(Bulgaria) Neftochimic Burgas	0–0	1–2
Željezničar (Bosnia and Herzegovina)	1–3	(Poland) Wisła Kraków	0–0	1–3
Sheriff Tiraspol (Moldova)	0–3	(Slovenia) Olimpija Ljubljana	0–0	0–3
Kapaz (Azerbaijan)	0–7	(Turkey) Antalyaspor	0–2	0–5
Žalgiris (Lithuania)	2–7	(Poland) Ruch Chorzów	2–1	0–6
Aberdeen (Scotland)	2–2 (a)	(Republic of Ireland) Bohemians	1–2	1–0
GÍ (Faroe Islands)	1–4	(Sweden) IFK Norrköping	0–2	1–2
Liepājas Metalurgs (Latvia)	1–2	(Norway) Brann	1–1	0–1
Slavia Mozyr (Belarus)	1–1 (a)	(Israel) Maccabi Haifa	1–1	0–0
Slovan Bratislava (Slovakia)	4–0	(Georgia (country)) Locomotive Tbilisi	2–0	2–0
Sliema Wanderers (Malta)	3–5	(Federal Republic of Yugoslavia) Partizan	2–1	1–4
Constructorul Chișinău (Moldova)	2–11	(Bulgaria) CSKA Sofia	2–3	0–8
AIK (Sweden)	3–0	(Belarus) Gomel	1–0	2–0
HJK (Finland)	4–3	(Luxembourg) Grevenmacher	4–1	0–2
Glentoran (Northern Ireland)	0–4	(Norway) Lillestrøm	0–3	0–1
Ekranas (Lithuania)	0–7	(Belgium) Lierse	0–3	0–4
Boavista (Portugal)	5–0	(Wales) Barry Town	2–0	3–0
Constel·lació (Andorra)	0–16	(Spain) Rayo Vallecano	0–10	0–6
Lausanne-Sports (Switzerland)	2–0	(Republic of Ireland) Cork City	1–0	1–0
Rijeka (Croatia)	8–6	(Malta) Valletta	3–2	5–4 (a.e.t.)
Amica Wronki (Poland)	6–3	(Liechtenstein) Vaduz	3–0	3–3

== First round ==
Team 1	Agg.	Team 2	1st leg	2nd leg
Zimbru Chișinău (Moldova)	1–4	(Germany) Hertha BSC	1–2	0–2
Antalyaspor (Turkey)	2–6	(Germany) Werder Bremen	2–0	0–6
Bohemians (Republic of Ireland)	2–3	(Germany) 1. FC Kaiserslautern	1–3	1–0
VfB Stuttgart (Germany)	3–3 (a)	(Scotland) Heart of Midlothian	1–0	2–3
Drnovice (Czech Republic)	0–1	(Germany) 1860 Munich	0–0	0–1
Lokomotiv Moscow (Russia)	4–2	(Bulgaria) Neftochimic Burgas	4–2	0–0
IFK Norrköping (Sweden)	3–4	(Czech Republic) Slovan Liberec	2–2	1–2
Rapid București (Romania)	0–1	(England) Liverpool	0–1	0–0
Zürich (Switzerland)	1–4	(Belgium) Genk	1–2	0–2
Olimpija Ljubljana (Slovenia)	2–3	(Spain) Espanyol	2–1	0–2
Vorskla Poltava (Ukraine)	2–4	(Portugal) Boavista	1–2	1–2
Brøndby (Denmark)	1–2	(Croatia) Osijek	1–2	0–0
Ruch Chorzów (Poland)	1–7	(Italy) Internazionale	0–3	1–4
Pobeda (North Macedonia)	0–6	(Italy) Parma	0–2	0–4
Lausanne-Sports (Switzerland)	5–2	(Russia) Torpedo Moscow	3–2	2–0
Celta Vigo (Spain)	1–0	(Croatia) Rijeka	0–0	1–0 (a.e.t.)
Leicester City (England)	2–4	(Federal Republic of Yugoslavia) Red Star Belgrade	1–1	1–3
Roda JC (Netherlands)	1–4	(Slovakia) Inter Slovnaft Bratislava	0–2	1–2
Kryvbas Kryvyi Rih (Ukraine)	0–6	(France) Nantes	0–1	0–5
PAOK (Greece)	6–4	(Israel) Beitar Jerusalem	3–1	3–3
Slavia Prague (Czech Republic)	5–0	(Denmark) AB	3–0	2–0
Rapid Wien (Austria)	4–1	(Sweden) Örgryte IS	3–0	1–1
Gent (Belgium)	0–9	(Netherlands) Ajax	0–6	0–3
Lillestrøm (Norway)	4–3	(Russia) Dynamo Moscow	3–1	1–2
Košice (Slovakia)	2–3	(Austria) GAK	2–3	0–0
CSKA Sofia (Bulgaria)	2–2 (a)	(Hungary) MTK Hungária	1–2	1–0
Alavés (Spain)	4–3	(Turkey) Gaziantepspor	0–0	4–3
Tirol Innsbruck (Austria)	5–3	(Italy) Fiorentina	3–1	2–2
Club Brugge (Belgium)	3–0	(Cyprus) APOEL	2–0	1–0
CSKA Moscow (Russia)	0–1	(Denmark) Viborg	0–0	0–1 (a.e.t.)
Celtic (Scotland)	3–2	(Finland) HJK	2–0	1–2 (a.e.t.)
Gueugnon (France)	0–1	(Greece) Iraklis	0–0	0–1
Chelsea (England)	1–2	(Switzerland) St. Gallen	1–0	0–2
Zaragoza (Spain)	5–5 (3–4 p)	(Poland) Wisła Kraków	4–1	1–4 (a.e.t.)
Molde (Norway)	1–2	(Spain) Rayo Vallecano	0–1	1–1
HIT Gorica (Slovenia)	1–11	(Italy) Roma	1–4	0–7
AIK (Sweden)	1–2	(Denmark) Herfølge	0–1	1–1 (a.e.t.)
Vitesse (Netherlands)	4–2	(Israel) Maccabi Haifa	3–0	1–2
Vasas (Hungary)	2–4	(Greece) AEK Athens	2–2	0–2
Partizan (Federal Republic of Yugoslavia)	1–2	(Portugal) Porto	1–1	0–1
Alania Vladikavkaz (Russia)	0–5	(Poland) Amica Wronki	0–3	0–2
Halmstads BK (Sweden)	4–3	(Portugal) Benfica	2–1	2–2
Dunaferr (Hungary)	1–4	(Netherlands) Feyenoord	0–1	1–3
Lierse (Belgium)	1–5	(France) Bordeaux	0–0	1–5
Polonia Warsaw (Poland)	0–3	(Italy) Udinese	0–1	0–2
Basel (Switzerland)	7–6	(Norway) Brann	3–2	4–4
Napredak Kruševac (Federal Republic of Yugoslavia)	0–6	(Greece) OFI	0–0	0–6
Slovan Bratislava (Slovakia)	1–4	(Croatia) Dinamo Zagreb	0–3	1–1

== Second round ==
Team 1	Agg.	Team 2	1st leg	2nd leg
Iraklis (Greece)	4–5	(Germany) 1. FC Kaiserslautern	1–3	3–2
Osijek (Croatia)	4–1	(Austria) Rapid Wien	2–1	2–0
Udinese (Italy)	1–3	(Greece) PAOK	1–0	0–3 (a.e.t.)
Werder Bremen (Germany)	9–3	(Belgium) Genk	4–1	5–2
Halmstads BK (Sweden)	4–5	(Germany) 1860 Munich	3–2	1–3
AEK Athens (Greece)	6–2	(Denmark) Herfølge	5–0	1–2
Hertha BSC (Germany)	4–2	(Poland) Amica Wronki	3–1	1–1
Lillestrøm (Norway)	3–5	(Spain) Alavés	1–3	2–2
Internazionale (Italy)	1–1 (a)	(Netherlands) Vitesse	0–0	1–1
Bordeaux (France)	3–2	(Scotland) Celtic	1–1	2–1 (a.e.t.)
Espanyol (Spain)	4–1	(Austria) GAK	4–0	0–1
Boavista (Portugal)	1–2	(Italy) Roma	0–1	1–1
Tirol Innsbruck (Austria)	2–3	(Germany) VfB Stuttgart	1–0	1–3
Red Star Belgrade (Federal Republic of Yugoslavia)	1–3	(Spain) Celta Vigo	1–0	0–3 (Note: This 2nd leg match in Vigo actually ended with the score 5–3 for the hosts Celta, but was later awarded as 3–0 win for Celta Vigo since it was discovered that Red Star fielded two suspended players.)
Lokomotiv Moscow (Russia)	3–1	(Slovakia) Inter Slovnaft Bratislava	1–0	2–1
Basel (Switzerland)	1–3	(Netherlands) Feyenoord	1–2	0–1
Liverpool (England)	4–2	(Czech Republic) Slovan Liberec	1–0	3–2
Rayo Vallecano (Spain)	2–2 (a)	(Denmark) Viborg	1–0	1–2
Lausanne-Sports (Switzerland)	3–2	(Netherlands) Ajax	1–0	2–2
Nantes (France)	3–1	(Hungary) MTK Hungária	2–1	1–0
Club Brugge (Belgium)	3–2	(Switzerland) St. Gallen	2–1	1–1
Parma (Italy)	2–1	(Croatia) Dinamo Zagreb	2–0	0–1
OFI (Greece)	3–6	(Czech Republic) Slavia Prague	2–2	1–4
Wisła Kraków (Poland)	0–3	(Portugal) Porto	0–0	0–3

== Final phase ==
In the final phase, teams played against each other over two legs on a home-and-away basis, except for the one-match final. The mechanism of the draws for each round was as follows:

- In the draws for the third and fourth rounds, teams were seeded and divided into groups containing an equal number of seeded and unseeded teams. In each group, the seeded teams were drawn against the unseeded teams, with the first team drawn hosting the first leg. Teams from the same association could not be drawn against each other.
- In the draws for the quarter-finals onwards, there were no seedings and teams from the same association could be drawn against each other.

=== Bracket ===
Third round
(Germany) Bayer Leverkusen	4	0	4
(Greece) AEK Athens	4	2	6
(Belgium) Club Brugge	0	1	1
(Spain) Barcelona	2	1	3
(Netherlands) Feyenoord	2	1	3
(Germany) VfB Stuttgart	2	2	4
(Ukraine) Shakhtar Donetsk	0	0	0
(Spain) Celta Vigo	0	1	1
(Spain) Espanyol	0	0	0
(Portugal) Porto	2	0	2
(France) Nantes	4	3	7
(Switzerland) Lausanne-Sports	3	1	4
(Italy) Roma	1	3	4
(Germany) Hamburger SV	0	0	0
(Greece) Olympiacos	2	0	2
(England) Liverpool	2	2	4
(Spain) Alavés	1	3	4
(Norway) Rosenborg	1	1	2
(Germany) Hertha BSC	0	1	1
(Italy) Internazionale	0	2	2
(Russia) Lokomotiv Moscow	0	0	0
(Spain) Rayo Vallecano	0	2	2
(France) Bordeaux	4	0	4
(Germany) Werder Bremen	1	0	1
(Croatia) Osijek	2	1	3
(Czech Republic) Slavia Prague	0	5	5
(Scotland) Rangers	1	0	1
(Germany) 1. FC Kaiserslautern	0	3	3
(Netherlands) PSV Eindhoven	3	1	4
(Greece) PAOK	0	0	0
(Italy) Parma	2	2	4
(Germany) 1860 Munich	2	0	2

Fourth round
(Greece) AEK Athens	0	0	0
(Spain) Barcelona	1	5	6
(Germany) VfB Stuttgart	0	1	1
(Spain) Celta Vigo	0	2	2
(Portugal) Porto	3	1	4
(France) Nantes	1	2	3
(Italy) Roma	0	1	1
(England) Liverpool	2	0	2
(Spain) Alavés	3	2	5
(Italy) Internazionale	3	0	3
(Spain) Rayo Vallecano	4	2	6
(France) Bordeaux	1	1	2
(Czech Republic) Slavia Prague	0	0	0
(Germany) 1. FC Kaiserslautern	0	1	1
(Netherlands) PSV Eindhoven (a)	2	2	4
(Italy) Parma	1	3	4

Quarter-finals
(Spain) Barcelona (a)	2	2	4
(Spain) Celta Vigo	1	3	4
(Portugal) Porto	0	0	0
(England) Liverpool	0	2	2
(Spain) Alavés	3	1	4
(Spain) Rayo Vallecano	0	2	2
(Germany) 1. FC Kaiserslautern	1	1	2
(Netherlands) PSV Eindhoven	0	0	0

Semi-finals
(Spain) Barcelona	0	0	0
(England) Liverpool	0	1	1
(Spain) Alavés	5	4	9
(Germany) 1. FC Kaiserslautern	1	1	2

Final
16 May – Dortmund
(England) Liverpool (g.g.)	5
(Spain) Alavés	4

=== Third round ===
Team 1	Agg.	Team 2	1st leg	2nd leg
Hertha BSC (Germany)	1–2	(Italy) Internazionale	0–0	1–2
Parma (Italy)	4–2	(Germany) 1860 Munich	2–2	2–0
Feyenoord (Netherlands)	3–4	(Germany) VfB Stuttgart	2–2	1–2
Lokomotiv Moscow (Russia)	0–2	(Spain) Rayo Vallecano	0–0	0–2
PSV Eindhoven (Netherlands)	4–0	(Greece) PAOK	3–0	1–0
Roma (Italy)	4–0	(Germany) Hamburger SV	1–0	3–0
Nantes (France)	7–4	(Switzerland) Lausanne-Sports	4–3	3–1
Bordeaux (France)	4–1	(Germany) Werder Bremen	4–1	0–0
Olympiacos (Greece)	2–4	(England) Liverpool	2–2	0–2
Bayer Leverkusen (Germany)	4–6	(Greece) AEK Athens	4–4	0–2
Shakhtar Donetsk (Ukraine)	0–1	(Spain) Celta Vigo	0–0	0–1
Alavés (Spain)	4–2	(Norway) Rosenborg	1–1	3–1
Espanyol (Spain)	0–2	(Portugal) Porto	0–2	0–0
Osijek (Croatia)	3–5	(Czech Republic) Slavia Prague	2–0	1–5
Club Brugge (Belgium)	1–3	(Spain) Barcelona	0–2	1–1
Rangers (Scotland)	1–3	(Germany) 1. FC Kaiserslautern	1–0	0–3

=== Fourth round ===
Team 1	Agg.	Team 2	1st leg	2nd leg
Slavia Prague (Czech Republic)	0–1	(Germany) 1. FC Kaiserslautern	0–0	0–1
VfB Stuttgart (Germany)	1–2	(Spain) Celta Vigo	0–0	1–2
PSV Eindhoven (Netherlands)	4–4 (a)	(Italy) Parma	2–1	2–3
AEK Athens (Greece)	0–6	(Spain) Barcelona	0–1	0–5
Alavés (Spain)	5–3	(Italy) Internazionale	3–3	2–0
Porto (Portugal)	4–3	(France) Nantes	3–1	1–2
Rayo Vallecano (Spain)	6–2	(France) Bordeaux	4–1	2–1
Roma (Italy)	1–2	(England) Liverpool	0–2	1–0

=== Quarter-finals ===
Team 1	Agg.	Team 2	1st leg	2nd leg
Barcelona (Spain)	4–4 (a)	(Spain) Celta Vigo	2–1	2–3
Porto (Portugal)	0–2	(England) Liverpool	0–0	0–2
Alavés (Spain)	4–2	(Spain) Rayo Vallecano	3–0	1–2
1. FC Kaiserslautern (Germany)	2–0	(Netherlands) PSV Eindhoven	1–0	1–0

=== Semi-finals ===
Team 1	Agg.	Team 2	1st leg	2nd leg
Alavés (Spain)	9–2	(Germany) 1. FC Kaiserslautern	5–1	4–1
Barcelona (Spain)	0–1	(England) Liverpool	0–0	0–1

=== Final ===
The final was played on 16 May 2001 at the Westfalenstadion in Dortmund, Germany.

16 May 2001
20:45 UTC+2

Liverpool (England)	5–4 (a.e.t./g.g.)	(Spain) Alavés
Babbel 3'; Gerrard 16'; McAllister 40' (pen.); Fowler 72'; Geli 116' (o.g.)	Report	Alonso 26'; Moreno 47', 49'; Cruyff 88'

Westfalenstadion, Dortmund
Attendance: 48,050
Referee: Gilles Veissière (France)

== Statistics ==
Statistics exclude qualifying round.

=== Top goalscorers ===
Rank	Player	Team	Goals	Minutes played
1	(Federal Republic of Yugoslavia) Goran Drulić	(Federal Republic of Yugoslavia) Red Star Belgrade	6	340
1	(Poland) Marcin Kuźba	(Switzerland) Lausanne-Sports	6	527
1	(Spain) Javi Moreno	(Spain) Alavés	6	530
1	(Greece) Demis Nikolaidis	(Greece) AEK Athens	6	703
5	(Romania) Viorel Moldovan	(France) Nantes	5	391
5	(Uruguay) Álvaro Recoba	(Italy) Internazionale	5	575
5	(Italy) Marco Delvecchio	(Italy) Roma	5	586
5	(Brazil) Rivaldo	(Spain) Barcelona	5	595
5	(Uruguay) Iván Alonso	(Spain) Alavés	5	774
5	(Brazil) Pena	(Portugal) Porto	5	888

== See also ==
- 2000–01 UEFA Champions League
- 2000 UEFA Intertoto Cup
