= CD Huracán Z =

Spanish football team

Huracán Z
- Full name: Club Deportivo Huracán Z
- Founded: 1954
- Dissolved: 2016
- Ground: Rafa Tejerina, Trobajo del Camino, Castile and León, Spain
- Capacity: 500
- Chairman: (Spain) María Teresa Lage
- Manager: (Spain) José Ángel Aláez
- 2015–16: Segunda Provincial – León, 7th of 15
Home colours	Away colours

Club Deportivo Huracán Z was a Spanish football team based in Trobajo del Camino, town belonging to San Andrés del Rabanedo municipality, in the autonomous community of Castile and León. Founded in 1954 and dissolved in 2016, it last played in Segunda Provincial – León, holding home games at Estadio Municipal Rafa Tejerina, with a capacity of 500 seats.

== Season to season ==
Season	Tier	Division	Place	Copa del Rey
1979–80	7	2ª Reg.	6th	
1980–81	6	1ª Reg.	4th	
1981–82	6	1ª Reg.	1st	
1982–83	5	Reg. Pref.	10th	
1983–84	5	Reg. Pref.	8th	
1984–85	5	Reg. Pref.	17th	
1985–86	6	1ª Reg.	2nd	
1986–87	6	1ª Reg.	3rd	
1987–88	5	Reg. Pref.	13th	
1988–89	5	Reg. Pref.	8th	
1989–90	5	Reg. Pref.	14th	
1990–91	6	1ª Reg.	1st	
1991–92	5	Reg. Pref.	4th	
1992–93	DNP			
1993–94	DNP			
1994–95	DNP			
1995–96	6	1ª Reg.	3rd	
1996–97	6	1ª Reg.	17th	
1997–98	6	1ª Reg.	4th	

Season	Tier	Division	Place	Copa del Rey
1998–99	6	1ª Reg.	4th	
1999–2000	6	1ª Prov.	4th	
2000–01	6	1ª Prov.	2nd	
2001–02	6	1ª Prov.	1st	
2002–03	5	1ª Reg.	10th	
2003–04	5	1ª Reg.	2nd	
2004–05	4	3ª	10th	
2005–06	4	3ª	4th	
2006–07	4	3ª	5th	
2007–08	4	3ª	8th	
2008–09	4	3ª	7th	
2009–10	4	3ª	5th	
2010–11	4	3ª	11th	
2011–12	4	3ª	18th	
2012–13	5	1ª Reg.	4th	
2013–14	5	1ª Reg.	(R)	
2014–15	7	2ª Prov.	13th	
2015–16	7	2ª Prov.	7th	

- 8 seasons in Tercera División

== Notable former players ==
- (Brazil) Addison Alves

== Notable former managers ==
- (Spain) Luis Cembranos
