= Krzysztof Piskuła =

Polish footballer

Personal information
- Date of birth: 19 August 1973 (age 53)
- Place of birth: Poznań, Poland
- Height: 1.81 m (5 ft 11 in)
- Position: Midfielder

Senior career*
Years	Team	Apps	(Gls)
1992–1999	Lech Poznań	174	(35)
2000–2002	Amica Wronki	46	(3)
2002–2004	Lech Poznań	35	(5)
2004–2005	Arka Gdynia	31	(8)
2005–2007	Mieszko Gniezno		
2008	Warta Poznań	20	(1)
2009	Polonia Słubice	12	(2)
2009–2011	Stella Luboń		
2011	Fogo Luboń		
2011–2012	Las Puszczykowo		
2012–2015	Lech Poznań (oldboys)		
2015–2017	Patria Buk		
2017	Luboński KS		
2018	Lech Poznań (oldboys)		

International career
1999	Poland	1	(0)
- * Club domestic league appearances and goals

Krzysztof Piskuła (born 19 August 1973) is a Polish former professional footballer who played as a midfielder.

Piskuła played several seasons in the Polish Ekstraklasa with Lech Poznań and Amica Wronki. He also made one appearance for the Poland national team in a friendly against New Zealand in 1999.

== Honours ==
Lech Poznań

- Ekstraklasa: 1992–93
- Polish Cup: 2003–04
- Polish Super Cup: 2004

Amica Wronki

- Polish Cup: 1999–2000
