= Rafał Andraszak =

Polish footballer (born 1978)

Personal information
- Date of birth: 5 February 1978 (age 48)
- Place of birth: Słupsk, Poland
- Height: 1.79 m (5 ft 10 in)
- Position: Striker

Senior career*
Years	Team	Apps	(Gls)
–1997	Jantar Ustka		
1997–2002	Amica Wronki	19	(1)
2002	Polonia Bydgoszcz		
2003–2004	Piast Gliwice		
2004	Górnik Zabrze	8	(0)
2005	Podbeskidzie Bielsko-Biała	17	(2)
2005–2007	Górnik Zabrze	41	(3)
2007–2009	Piast Gliwice	23	(1)
2009	Flota Świnoujście	28	(2)
2010	Ruch Zdzieszowice	12	(1)
2010–2012	Energetyk ROW Rybnik	52	(6)
2012–2014	Fortuna Gliwice		
- * Club domestic league appearances and goals

Rafał Andraszak (born 5 February 1978) is a Polish former professional footballer who played as a striker.

== Honours ==
Amica Wronki

- Polish Cup: 1999–2000
- Polish Super Cup: 1999

Ruch Zdzieszowice

- III liga Opole-Silesian: 2009–10

Energetyk ROW Rybnik

- III liga Opole-Silesian: 2010–11
