= Kobi Ganon =

Israeli footballer

Kobi Ganon קובי גנון
Personal information
- Full name: Kobi Ganon
- Date of birth: May 17, 1976 (age 50)
- Place of birth: Haifa, Israel
- Height: 1.87 m (6 ft 1 1/2 in)
- Position: Left back

Youth career
- 1985–1996: Maccabi Haifa

Senior career*
Years	Team	Apps	(Gls)
1996–1999	Maccabi Haifa	26	(0)
1997–1998	→ Hapoel Beit She'an	35	(1)
1998–1999	→ Hapoel Kfar Saba	20	(0)
2009–2011	Beitar Jerusalem	63	(4)
2001–2012	Maccabi Petah Tikva	285	(11)
- * Club domestic league appearances and goals

Kobi Ganon (Hebrew: קובי גנון; born 17 May 1976) is an Israeli footballer.

== Career ==
Ganon started his career in Maccabi Haifa's youth team as striker. In 1996 joined the senior team moved to be a left back.

In August 2001 signed for Maccabi Petah Tikva, there played 11 seasons. In summer 2012 retired.
