= Sławomir Paluch =

Polish footballer (born 1975)

Personal information
- Full name: Sławomir Andrzej Paluch
- Date of birth: 27 November 1975 (age 50)
- Place of birth: Knurów, Poland
- Height: 1.77 m (5 ft 10 in)
- Position: Midfielder

Team information
- Current team: Borowik Szczejkowice
- Number: 21

Youth career
- –1990: Górnik Czerwionka

Senior career*
Years	Team	Apps	(Gls)
1990–1993	Odra Wodzisław Śląski		
1993–1994	Ruch Chorzów	9	(0)
1994–1995	Górnik Zabrze		
1995–1998	Odra Wodzisław Śląski		
1998–2000	Wisła Kraków	17	(1)
2000–2003	Ruch Chorzów	58	(8)
2006–2007	Polonia Łaziska Górne		
2007–2010	Sokół Zabrzeg		
2010	LKS Bestwina		
2011–2014	Fortuna Wyry		
2015–2021	LKS Bełk		
2022	KS Pietraszyn	14	(8)
2022–2023	LKS Bełk II	24	(3)
2023	Unia Książenice	9	(1)
2024–	Borowik Szczejkowice	3	(0)

International career
1997	Poland	2	(0)
- * Club domestic league appearances and goals

Sławomir Andrzej Paluch (born 27 November 1975) is a Polish footballer who plays as a midfielder for Borowik Szczejkowice.

He made two appearances for the Poland national team in 1997.

== Honours ==
Wisła Kraków

- Ekstraklasa: 1998–99
