= Ara Nigoyan =

Armenian footballer

Personal information
- Full name: Ara Nigoyan
- Date of birth: 27 October 1968 (age 57)
- Place of birth: Soviet Armenia
- Positions: Defender; midfielder

Senior career*
Years	Team	Apps	(Gls)
1995 –1996	F.C. Ararat Tehran		
1996 –1998	F.C. Zob Ahan		
1998 –2001	FC Ararat Yerevan		

International career
1992 – 1998	Armenia	3	(0)
- * Club domestic league appearances and goals

Ara Nigoyan (born 27 October 1968) is a retired football defender and midfielder from Armenia. He obtained a total number of three caps for the national team. Nigoyan made his debut on 14 October 1992 against Moldova (0–0).
