= Mamia Jikia =

Georgian footballer (born 1975)

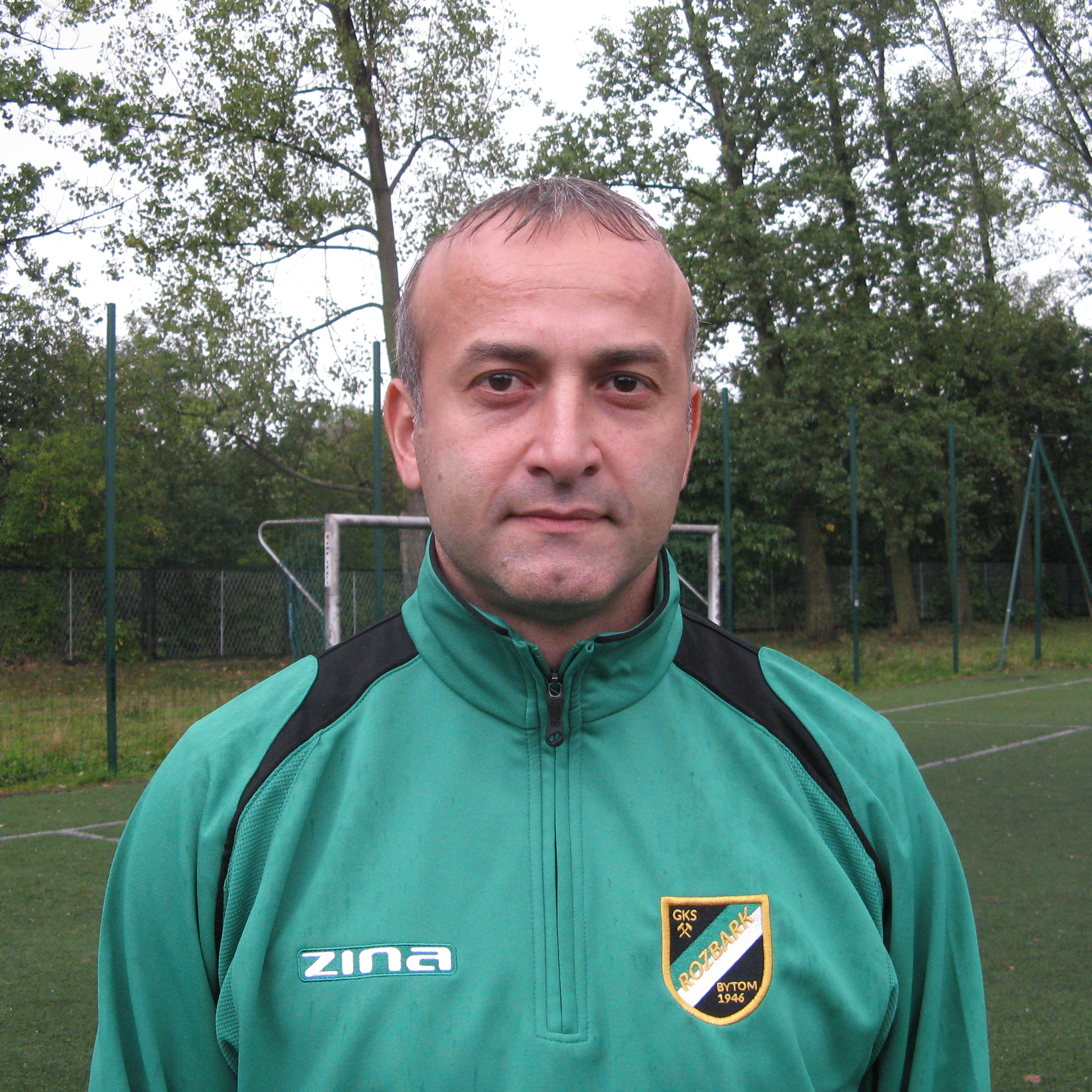
- Jikia in 2018

Personal information
- Date of birth: 11 December 1975 (age 50)
- Place of birth: Poti, Georgian SSR
- Height: 1.81 m (5 ft 11 in)
- Position: Midfielder

Senior career*
Years	Team	Apps	(Gls)
1991	Zugdidi-91	8	(3)
1991–1992	Odishi Zugdidi	17	(1)
1992–1994	Shevardeni-1906 Tbilisi	45	(10)
1995	LASK	0	(0)
1996	Shevardeni-1906 Tbilisi	14	(3)
1996	Odishi Zugdidi	14	(4)
1997–2002	Ruch Chorzów	127	(8)
2002–2004	Amica Wronki	33	(2)
2004–2005	Wisła Płock	26	(1)
2006	ŁKS Łódź	27	(0)
2007–2008	Ruch Chorzów	1	(0)
2016–2018	Unia Kosztowy	68	(5)
2018–2019	Rozbark Bytom	20	(0)
Total		400	(37)

International career
2002–2004	Georgia	3	(0)

Managerial career
- 2018–2020: Rozbark Bytom
- 2021: Urania Ruda Śląska
- 2021–2022: Śląsk Świętochłowice
- * Club domestic league appearances and goals

Mamia Jikia (Georgian: მამია ჯიქია; born 11 December 1975) is a Georgian professional football manager and former player who played as a midfielder.

He started his career in native Georgia and had a short stint with Austrian side LASK, later spending most of his life in Poland, where he stayed from 1997 until 2008, before returning in 2016. Since 2018, he also holds Polish citizenship.

== Honours ==
Ruch Chorzów

- II liga: 2006–07

Unia Kosztowy

- Regional league Katowice I: 2017–18
