= Hannu Haarala =

Finnish footballer (born 1981)

Personal information
- Date of birth: 15 August 1981 (age 45)
- Place of birth: Helsinki, Finland
- Height: 1.75 m (5 ft 9 in)
- Position: Right back

Team information
- Current team: Honka
- Number: 11

Youth career
- HJK

Senior career*
Years	Team	Apps	(Gls)
1999–2002	HJK	66	(5)
2002–2005	Heerenveen	24	(0)
2005–2011	Honka	68	(2)

International career
2005	Finland	2	(0)
- * Club domestic league appearances and goals

Hannu Haarala (born 15 August 1981) is a Finnish former footballer who played as a defender.

== Career statistics ==
As of 1 September 2024.

Appearances and goals by club, season and competition
Club	Season	League			Cup (Note: Includes Suomen Cup)		League cup		Europe		Total	
Club	Season	Division	Apps	Goals	Apps	Goals	Apps	Goals	Apps	Goals	Apps	Goals
KäPa	1999	Kakkonen	16	7	–		–		–		16	7
HJK	2000	Veikkausliiga	22	0	1	0	–		4 (Note: Appearances in UEFA Cup)	1	27	1
HJK	2001	Veikkausliiga	20	0	–		–		1	0	21	0
HJK	2002	Veikkausliiga	24	4	–		–		2	0	26	4
HJK	Total		66	4	1	0	0	0	7	1	74	5
Heerenveen	2002–03	Eredivisie	0	0	0	0	–		–		0	0
Heerenveen	2003–04	Eredivisie	9	0	–		–		–		9	0
Heerenveen	2003–04	Eredivisie	15	0	–		–		4	0	19	0
Heerenveen	Total		24	0	0	0	0	0	4	0	28	0
Honka	2005	Ykkönen	4	0	–		–		–		4	0
Honka	2007	Veikkausliiga	15	0	–		–		1 (Note: Appearance(s) in UEFA Intertoto Cup)	0	16	0
Honka	2008	Veikkausliiga	24	2	–		–		6	0	30	2
Honka	2009	Veikkausliiga	17	0	1	0	6	0	3 (Note: Appearances in UEFA Europa League)	0	27	0
Honka	2010	Veikkausliiga	12	0	0	0	2	0	–		14	0
Honka	Total		72	2	1	0	8	0	10	0	74	5
Career total			178	13	2	0	8	0	21	1	219	14
