= Luis Cembranos =

Spanish footballer & manager (born 1972)

Personal information
- Full name: Luis Cembranos Martínez
- Date of birth: 6 June 1972 (age 54)
- Place of birth: Lucerne, Switzerland
- Height: 1.76 m (5 ft 9 in)
- Position: Midfielder

Youth career
- Puente Castro
- 1990–1991: Barcelona

Senior career*
Years	Team	Apps	(Gls)
1991–1993	Barcelona C		
1993	→ Figueres (loan)	10	(6)
1993–1995	Barcelona B	39	(10)
1994–1995	Barcelona	3	(0)
1995–1998	Espanyol	70	(5)
1999–2004	Rayo Vallecano	124	(24)
2004–2005	Promesas Ponferrada	16	(10)
Total		262	(55)

International career
2000	Spain	1	(0)

Managerial career
- 2007–2009: Huracán Z
- 2011–2014: Cultural Leonesa
- 2015–2016: Lugo (assistant)
- 2016–2017: Zaragoza (assistant)
- 2017–2019: Rayo Vallecano B
- 2019–2020: Leganés B
- 2019: Leganés (caretaker)
- * Club domestic league appearances and goals

Luis Cembranos Martínez (born 6 June 1972) is a Spanish former professional footballer who played as a right midfielder. He is currently a manager.

He amassed La Liga totals of 155 games and 22 goals over the course of nine seasons, mainly with Espanyol and Rayo Vallecano. He also represented Barcelona in the competition.

Cembranos began working as a manager in 2007, with Huracán Z. He went on to be in charge of a host of clubs, as head coach as well as an assistant.

== Playing career ==
=== Club ===
Born in Lucerne, Switzerland, Cembranos was the son of Spanish emigrants and returned to that country in his teens, moving to León. Having signed for FC Barcelona as a teenager, his professional career began in Catalonia at age 20, on loan with UE Figueres in the Segunda División. After a good handful of games he returned to the parent club, being assigned to the reserve side and going on to be deployed in several positions.

After having totalled 177 minutes in La Liga with Barça (his debut came against Racing de Santander on 10 September 1994, courtesy of manager Johan Cruyff) and having made his only UEFA Champions League appearance, away to Manchester United the following month– he also played with the B's that campaign – in early 1995 Cembranos moved to another team in the league and the region, RCD Espanyol. There, he first began to be regularly featured in the top division.

In another January transfer window move, Cembranos joined Madrid's Rayo Vallecano in 1999, being an important member in his first months as they eventually returned to the top flight, scoring six goals during the (half)season. Both player and club continued to consolidate, and Rayo obtained their best-ever classification in 1999–2000, qualifying for the UEFA Cup via fair play.

Cembranos appeared very irregularly in his final three seasons, troubled by constant injuries that had already made him miss a good number of matches at Barcelona and Espanyol, mainly in the right knee. He was forced to retire in 2005 at age 33, and a couple of years after that had his first coaching experience with amateurs CD Huracán Z in Castile and León.

=== International ===
Courtesy of the best season of his career with Rayo (36 appearances, four goals), Cembranos earned his sole cap for Spain on 26 January 2000, when he came on as a substitute for Juan Carlos Valerón in the 76th minute of a 3–0 friendly win over Poland in Cartagena.

== Coaching career ==
In the summer of 2011, Cembranos was appointed manager of Cultural y Deportiva Leonesa, promoting to Segunda División B at the end of his second season. On 19 June 2017, following two assistant spells, he returned to head coaching duties with Rayo Vallecano B.

Cembranos left for CD Leganés on 5 July 2019, taking over their reserves also in the Tercera División. On 21 October, after the departure of Mauricio Pellegrino, he was appointed at the first team in an interim manner. His first match in charge occurred five days later, a 1–0 home victory over RCD Mallorca which was their first of the campaign.

== Managerial statistics ==
As of 8 March 2020

Managerial record by team and tenure
Team	Nat	From	To	Record								Ref
Team	Nat	From	To	G	W	D	L	GF	GA	GD	Win %	Ref
Huracán Z	(Spain)	18 July 2007	1 December 2009	91	37	29	25	127	97	+30	40.66	
Cultural Leonesa	(Spain)	27 July 2011	20 May 2014	122	63	32	27	199	114	+85	51.64	
Rayo Vallecano B	(Spain)	19 June 2017	21 May 2019	78	39	19	20	122	80	+42	50.00	
Leganés B	(Spain)	5 July 2019	21 May 2020	26	10	8	8	46	39	+7	38.46	
Leganés (caretaker)	(Spain)	21 October 2019	4 November 2019	3	1	0	2	2	7	−5	33.33	
Total				320	150	88	82	496	337	+159	46.88	—

== See also ==
- List of Spain international footballers born outside Spain
