= Robert Andersson (footballer) =

Swedish footballer

Personal information
- Date of birth: 22 August 1971 (age 55)
- Place of birth: Sweden
- Height: 1.73 m (5 ft 8 in)
- Position: Forward

Senior career*
Years	Team	Apps	(Gls)
1990–1997	Halmstad	97	(36)
1997–1998	IFK Göteborg	18	(3)
1998	Iraklis	7	(0)
1999–2003	Halmstad	108	(30)
2004–2006	BK Astrio		
Total		230	(69)

International career
1995	Sweden	1	(0)
- * Club domestic league appearances and goals

Robert Andersson (born 22 August 1971) is a Swedish former professional footballer who played as a forward for Halmstad, IFK Göteborg, Iraklis, and BK Astrio.

Andersson became the most expensive national transfer in Sweden in 1997 when IFK Göteborg paid 7.5 million SEK to Halmstads BK for him.

== Honours ==
Halmstad

- Allsvenskan: 2000
