= Marcel Cupák =

Czech footballer (1973–2025)

Personal information
- Date of birth: 19 December 1973
- Place of birth: Brno, Czechoslovakia
- Date of death: 7 April 2025 (aged 51)
- Place of death: Brno, Czech Republic
- Height: 1.86 m (6 ft 1 in)
- Position: Forward

Senior career*
Years	Team	Apps	(Gls)
1993	Svit Zlín	13	(4)
1994–1997	Boby Brno	88	(16)
1998–1999	Sigma Olomouc	23	(1)
1999	České Budějovice		
1999–2001	Drnovice	56	(12)
2001–2003	Brno	19	(1)

International career
1994	Czech Republic U21	3	(1)
- * Club domestic league appearances and goals

Marcel Cupák (19 December 1973 – 7 April 2025) was a Czech professional footballer who played as a forward. He played 199 matches in the Czech First League between 1993 and 2003. He also spent time at the second level of Czech football with České Budějovice in the spring of 1999. During his time at Drnovice, he played in the UEFA Cup in matches against 1860 Munich. Following his professional career, he played non-league football for TJ Sokol Křoví.

Cupák died on 7 April 2025, at the age of 51.
