= Tomáš Kuchař =

Czech footballer

Personal information
- Date of birth: 25 August 1976 (age 50)
- Place of birth: Pečky, Czechoslovakia
- Height: 1.79 m (5 ft 10 in)
- Position: Midfielder

Senior career*
Years	Team	Apps	(Gls)
1994–1997	Bohemians Praha	79	(9)
1997–2003	Slavia Prague	137	(12)
2003	Shinnik	16	(2)
2004	Teplice	10	(1)
2005	Pogoń Szczecin	7	(0)
2005	Bohemians Praha	2	(0)
2006–2007	Aris Limassol		
2008	Bohemians Praha	1	(0)
2008–2009	FC Vítkovice	19	(3)

International career
1996–1997	Czech Republic U21	3	(0)
- * Club domestic league appearances and goals

Tomáš Kuchař (born 25 August 1976) is a Czech former professional footballer who played as a midfielder.

== Career ==
Kuchař signed for Shinnik Yaroslavl in Russia in 2003.

== Honours ==
Slavia Prague

- Czech Cup: 1998–99, 2001–02
