= Goran Drulić =

Serbian footballer

Personal information
- Date of birth: 17 April 1977 (age 49)
- Place of birth: Negotin, SFR Yugoslavia
- Height: 1.84 m (6 ft 0 in)
- Position: Striker

Youth career
- Dunav Prahovo
- Hajduk Veljko
- 1992–1995: Red Star Belgrade

Senior career*
Years	Team	Apps	(Gls)
1995–2001	Red Star Belgrade	65	(25)
1995–1996	→ Voždovac (loan)		
1996	→ Radnički Kragujevac (loan)		
1997	→ Barcelona B (loan)	14	(0)
2001–2005	Zaragoza	39	(3)
2005	Lokeren	13	(4)
2006–2008	OFI	41	(13)
2008–2009	Kavala	10	(0)
2009–2010	La Muela	29	(7)
2010–2011	Andorra CF	43	(9)
2012	Sariñena	13	(9)
Total		267	(70)

International career
2000–2001	FR Yugoslavia	4	(0)
- * Club domestic league appearances and goals

Goran Drulić (Serbian Cyrillic: Горан Друлић; born 17 April 1977) is a Serbian former footballer who played as a striker.

== Club career ==
Born in Negotin, Socialist Federal Republic of Yugoslavia, Drulić joined Red Star Belgrade's youth system at the age of 15, first attracting attention when he scored 51 goals in one season for the club's under-18 side. Before becoming a regular with the first team, he was loaned to FK Voždovac (1995–96), FK Radnički Kragujevac (1996), and FC Barcelona B (1997).

In the summer of 2001, Drulić was sold to Spain's Real Zaragoza for €13 million. Injured, he could only make his La Liga debut on 6 February 2002, playing 29 minutes in a 1–1 home draw against CD Tenerife.

In four seasons with the Aragonese club, Drulić only managed to appear in an average of ten league games, scoring just three goals (he played the 2002–03 campaign in Segunda División, netting twice in 12 matches as the club promoted one year after being relegated). He then switched to K.S.C. Lokeren Oost-Vlaanderen in the Belgian Pro League, moving in January 2006 to Greece's OFI.

In 2008–09, Drulić stayed in the country but dropped down to the second level, joining Kavala. In the following season he returned to Spain, signing for amateurs CD La Muela also in Aragon and helping the club achieve a first-ever promotion to Segunda División B.

== International career ==
Drulić made his debut for FR Yugoslavia on 15 November 2000, in a 1–2 friendly loss in Romania. In total he had four full caps, two in exhibition games and two in the 2002 FIFA World Cup qualification stage.
