= 1998 UEFA Intertoto Cup =

Tournament details
- Dates: 20 June 1998 – 25 August 1998
- Teams: 60

Final positions
- Champions: (Spain) Valencia (Germany) Werder Bremen (Italy) Bologna

Tournament statistics
- Matches played: 114
- Goals scored: 329 (2.89 per match)

The 1998 UEFA Intertoto Cup finals were won by Valencia, Werder Bremen, and Bologna. All three teams advanced to the UEFA Cup. The 1998 tournament saw Spanish clubs debut in the competition and also the return of English clubs, since the controversy surrounding its participants in 1995.

== Qualified teams ==
Qualified teams for 1998 UEFA Intertoto Cup
Entry round	Teams			
Third round	(Belgium) Harelbeke (5th)	(England) Crystal Palace (20th)	(France) Auxerre (7th)	(Germany) Hansa Rostock (6th)
Third round	(Italy) Bologna (8th)	(Netherlands) Fortuna Sittard (7th)	(Portugal) Estrela da Amadora (7th)	(Spain) Valencia (9th)
Second round	Austria Salzburg (4th)	(Belgium) Lommel (11th)	(Denmark) Akademisk Boldklub (5th)	(France) Bastia (9th)
Second round	(Germany) Werder Bremen (7th)	(Greece) Iraklis (6th)	(Italy) Sampdoria (9th)	(Netherlands) Twente (9th)
Second round	(Russia) Shinnik Yaroslavl (4th)	(Spain) Espanyol (10th)	(Sweden) Örebro (4th)	(Turkey) Samsunspor (5th)
First round	(Armenia) Erebuni-Homenmen (3rd)	Austria Wien (7th)	(Azerbaijan) Baki Fahlasi (5th)	(Belarus) Dnepr-Transmash Mogilev (4th)
First round	(Bulgaria) Spartak Varna (7th)	(Croatia) Hrvatski Dragovoljac (4th)	(Cyprus) Ethnikos Achna (4th)	(Czech Republic) Brno (10th)
First round	(Czech Republic) Hradec Králové (11th)	(Denmark) Lyngby (6th)	(Estonia) Tulevik Viljandi (5th)	(Faroe Islands) Vágs Bóltfelag (4th)
First round	(Finland) TPS (4th)	(Georgia (country)) Torpedo Kutaisi (4th)	(Hungary) Debrecen (9th)	(Hungary) Diósgyőri (11th)
First round	(Iceland) Leiftur (3rd)	(Israel) Hapoel Haifa (3rd)	(Latvia) Dinaburg (3rd)	(Lithuania) Inkaras Kaunas (4th)
First round	(Luxembourg) Hobscheid (6th)	(Malta) Sliema Wanderers (3rd)	(Northern Ireland) Omagh Town (9th)	(North Macedonia) Makedonija GP (3rd)
First round	(Norway) Stabæk (5th)	(Norway) Kongsvinger (6th)	(Poland) Ruch Chorzów (6th)	(Republic of Ireland) Shamrock Rovers (4th)
First round	(Romania) Naţional București (5th)	(Russia) Baltika Kaliningrad (9th)	(Slovakia) OD Trenčín (4th)	(Slovakia) Rimavská Sobota (6th)
First round	(Slovenia) Olimpija Ljubljana (5th)	(Sweden) Örgryte (5th)	(Switzerland) Sion (5th)	(Switzerland) St. Gallen (6th)
First round	(Turkey) Altay (7th)	(Ukraine) Vorskla Poltava (5th)	(Wales) Ebbw Vale (3rd)	(Federal Republic of Yugoslavia) Vojvodina (4th)

== First round ==
Team 1	Agg.	Team 2	1st leg	2nd leg
Altay (Turkey)	5–4	(Republic of Ireland) Shamrock Rovers	3–1	2–3
Ethnikos Achna (Cyprus)	2–5	(Sweden) Örgryte	2–1	0–4
Dnepr-Transmash Mogilev (Belarus)	2–10	(Hungary) Debrecen	2–4	0–6
Leiftur (Iceland)	0–6	(Ukraine) Vorskla Poltava	0–3	0–3
Ebbw Vale (Wales)	1–9	(Norway) Kongsvinger	1–6	0–3
Naţional București (Romania)	5–2	(Israel) Hapoel Haifa	3–1	2–1
Austria Wien	2–3	(Poland) Ruch Chorzów	0–1	2–2
Baltika Kaliningrad (Russia)	5–1	(Bulgaria) Spartak Varna	4–0	1–1
Stabæk (Norway)	3–5	(Federal Republic of Yugoslavia) Vojvodina	1–2	2–3
Hrvatski Dragovoljac (Croatia)	2–4	(Denmark) Lyngby	1–4	1–0
Rimavská Sobota (Slovakia)	3–2	(Northern Ireland) Omagh Town	1–0	2–2
Hobscheid (Luxembourg)	1–2	(Czech Republic) Hradec Králové	0–0	1–2
Diósgyőri (Hungary)	5–2	(Malta) Sliema Wanderers	2–0	3–2
TPS (Finland)	3–3 (a)	(Switzerland) Sion	0–1	3–2
Vágs Bóltfelag (Faroe Islands)	1–6	(Czech Republic) Brno	0–3	1–3
St. Gallen (Switzerland)	9–3	(Estonia) Tulevik Viljandi	3–2	6–1
Dinaburg (Latvia)	2–5	(Slovakia) OD Trenčín	1–1	1–4
Inkaras Kaunas (Lithuania)	1–1 (5–4 p)	(Azerbaijan) Baki Fahlasi	1–0	0–1
Torpedo Kutaisi (Georgia (country))	7–1	(Armenia) Erebuni-Homenmen	6–0	1–1
Makedonija GP (North Macedonia)	5–3	(Slovenia) Olimpija Ljubljana	4–2	1–1

=== First leg ===
20 June 1998

Baltika Kaliningrad (Russia)	4–0	(Bulgaria) Spartak Varna
Kastornyi 32'; R. Adzhindzhal 46'; Silin 59'; Vizyonok 71'	Report

Baltika Stadium, Kaliningrad
Attendance: 18,000
Referee: Jonny Ditlefsen (Norway)

20 June 1998

Ebbw Vale (Wales)	1–6	(Norway) Kongsvinger
Perry 18'	Report	Evensen 19'; Ernstsson 35'; Berg 55'; Solberg 71'; Alm 75'; Dybendal 79'

Eugene Cross Park, Ebbw Vale
Attendance: 520
Referee: Costas Kapitanis (Cyprus)

20 June 1998

Leiftur (Iceland)	0–3	(Ukraine) Vorskla Poltava
Nielsen 26'	Report

Ólafsfjarðarvöllur, Ólafsfjörður
Attendance: 350
Referee: Philippe Kalt (France)

Match awarded because Leiftur fielded an ineligible player.

20 June 1998

Naţional București (Romania)	3–1	(Israel) Hapoel Haifa
Vochin 18'; Liţă 63', 87'	Report	Tal 51'

Stadionul Cotroceni, Bucharest
Attendance: 200
Referee: Vančo Kocev (Macedonia)

20 June 1998

Diósgyőr (Hungary)	2–0	(Malta) Sliema Wanderers
Domokos 19'; Kulcsár 89' (pen.)

Diósgyőri Stadion, Miskolc
Attendance: 3,485
Referee: Yevi Kollari (Albania)

20 June 1998

Dnepr-Transmash Mogilev (Belarus)	2–4	(Hungary) Debrecen
Aharodnik 45'; Kazlow 80'	Report	Kiss 35'; Csehi 45', 63', 76'

Spartak Stadium, Mogilev
Attendance: 5,300
Referee: Hubert Byrne (Republic of Ireland)

20 June 1998

Ethnikos Achna (Cyprus)	2–1	(Sweden) Örgryte
Engomitis 37' (pen.); Neokleous 52'		Sjöstedt 17'

Antonis Papadopoulos Stadium, Larnaca
Attendance: 111
Referee: Lubomír Puček (Czech Republic)

20 June 1998

Hobscheid (Luxembourg)	0–0	(Czech Republic) Hradec Králové
	Report

Stade Koericherberg, Hobscheid
Attendance: 177
Referee: Džemal Čalija (Bosnia and Herzegovina)

20 June 1998

Stabæk (Norway)	1–2	(Federal Republic of Yugoslavia) Vojvodina
Belsvik 34'	Report	Lerinc 43', 52'

Nadderud Stadion, Bærum
Attendance: 162
Referee: Luc Huyghe (Belgium)

20 June 1998

VB Vágur (Faroe Islands)	0–3	(Czech Republic) Brno
		Kolomazník 11'; Valnoha 13'; Palínek 82'

Á Skørðunum, Hvalba
Attendance: 549
Referee: Brian Lawlor (Wales)

20 June 1998

St. Gallen (Switzerland)	3–2	(Estonia) Tulevik Viljandi
Yakin 31', 58'; Hellinga 38' (pen.)		Lell 4'; Pari 88'

Espenmoos, St. Gallen
Attendance: 717
Referee: Bujar Pregja (Albania)

20 June 1998

Hrvatski Dragovoljac (Croatia)	1–4	(Denmark) Lyngby
Bazina 14'	Report	Jensen 39', 89'; Hindsberg 50'; Havlykke 85'

ŠRC Stanko Vlainić-Dida, Slavonski Brod
Attendance: 700
Referee: Tomasz Mikulski (Poland)

20 June 1998

Austria Wien	0–1	(Poland) Ruch Chorzów
		Śrutwa 63'

Franz Horr Stadium, Vienna
Attendance: 1,500
Referee: Sten Kaldma (Estonia)

21 June 1998

Altay (Turkey)	3–1	(Republic of Ireland) Shamrock Rovers
Arayici 31'; Brkić 42'; Üstündağ 54'	Report	Tracey 10'

İzmir Alsancak Stadium, İzmir
Attendance: 10,000
Referee: Florin Chivulete (Romania)

21 June 1998

Dinaburg (Latvia)	1–1	(Slovakia) OD Trenčín
Fedotovs 44'	Report	Fabuš 10'

Tselnieks, Daugavpils
Attendance: 2,000
Referee: Mirosław Milewski (Poland)

21 June 1998

TPS (Finland)	0–1	(Switzerland) Sion
	Report	Pascale 72'

Veritas Stadion, Turku
Attendance: 400
Referee: Kristinn Jakobsson (Iceland)

21 June 1998

Inkaras Kaunas (Lithuania)	1–0	(Azerbaijan) Baki Fahlasi
Dunauskas 20'	Report

Inkaras Stadium, Kaunas
Attendance: 500
Referee: Lassin Isaksen (Faroe Islands)

21 June 1998

Makedonija GP (North Macedonia)	4–2	(Slovenia) Olimpija Ljubljana
Trifunov 11'; Naumoski 28'; Ivanov 75'; Janevski 85'	Report	Bozgo 44', 67'

Gjorče Petrov Stadium, Skopje
Attendance: 300
Referee: Dominique Tavel (Switzerland)

21 June 1998

Torpedo Kutaisi (Georgia (country))	6–0	(Armenia) Erebuni-Homenmen
Megreladze 2', 27'; Vachiberadze 30'; Janashia 43', 81'; Kvetenadze 84'	Report

Givi Kiladze Stadium, Kutaisi
Attendance: 4,000
Referee: Haim Yaacov (Israel)

21 June 1998

Rimavská Sobota (Slovakia)	1–0	(Northern Ireland) Omagh Town
Vilím 81'	Report

Na Zahradkach Stadium, Rimavská Sobota
Attendance: 5,537
Referee: Marcel Lică (Romania)

=== Second leg ===
27 June 1998

Spartak Varna (Bulgaria)	1–1	(Russia) Baltika Kaliningrad
Filipov 70'	Report	Vizyonok 71'

Spartak Stadium, Varna
Attendance: 200
Referee: Erol Ersoy (Turkey)

Baltika Kaliningrad won 5–1 on aggregate.

27 June 1998

Örgryte (Sweden)	4–0	(Cyprus) Ethnikos Achna
Corneliusson 7'; Källander 51', 73'; Karlsson 53'

Ullevi, Gothenburg
Attendance: 243
Referee: Sergejs Braga (Latvia)

Örgryte won 5–2 on aggregate.

27 June 1998

Hapoel Haifa (Israel)	1–2	(Romania) Naţional București
Tal 10'	Report	Pogăcean 22'; Axinia 52'

Kiryat Eliezer Stadium, Haifa
Attendance: 2,000
Referee: Khagani Mammadov (Azerbaijan)

National București won 5–2 on aggregate.

27 June 1998

Debrecen (Hungary)	6–0	(Belarus) Dnepr-Transmash Mogilev
Ilea 28', 44', 67'; Kiss 32', 54'; Pető 85'	Report

Stadion Oláh Gábor Út, Debrecen
Attendance: 4,000
Referee: Sten Johanzon (Sweden)

Debrecen won 10–2 on aggregate.

27 June 1998

Brno (Czech Republic)	3–1	(Faroe Islands) VB Vágur
Švancara 10', 22'; Pacanda 72'		Jørgensen 74'

Stadion Za Lužánkami, Brno
Attendance: 1,495
Referee: Sergo Kvaratskhelia (Georgia)

Brno won 6–1 on aggregate.

27 June 1998

Vojvodina (Federal Republic of Yugoslavia)	3–2	(Norway) Stabæk
Drinčić 4'; Bratić 43'; Lerinc 45'	Report	Belsvik 38'; Flem 69'

Karađorđe Stadium, Novi Sad
Attendance: 1,500
Referee: Ferenc Bede (Hungary)

Vojvodina won 5–3 on aggregate.

27 June 1998

Tulevik Viljandi (Estonia)	1–6	(Switzerland) St. Gallen
Arbeiter 10'		Contini 7'; Tsawa 42'; Yakin 43'; Vurens 60' dal Santo 79', 87'

Linnastaadion, Viljandi
Attendance: 185
Referee: Eyjölfur Ólafsson (Iceland)

St. Gallen won 9–3 on aggregate.

27 June 1998

OD Trenčín (Slovakia)	4–1	(Latvia) Dinaburg
Kulla 10'; Valachovič 42'; Ševela 65'; Hanko 85'	Report	Hryhorchuk 48'

Štadión na Sihoti, Trenčín
Attendance: 3,211
Referee: Anton Getzov (Bulgaria)

OD Trenčín won 5–2 on aggregate.

27 June 1998

Vorskla Poltava (Ukraine)	3–0	(Iceland) Leiftur
Chuichenko 8'; Hurka 49', 81'	Report

Vorskla Stadium, Poltava
Attendance: 3,500
Referee: Genadz Yakubovskiy (Belarus)

Vorskla Poltava won 6–0 on aggregate.

27 June 1998

Olimpija Ljubljana (Slovenia)	1–1	(North Macedonia) Makedonija GP
Ekmečić 2'	Report	Janevski 89'

Bežigrad Stadium, Ljubljana
Attendance: 150
Referee: Vladimir Antonov (Moldova)

Makedonija GP won 5–3 on aggregate.

27 June 1998

Erebuni-Homenmen (Armenia)	1–1	(Georgia (country)) Torpedo Kutaisi
Hovanisyan 23'	Report	Khujadze 30'

Hrazdan Stadium, Yerevan
Attendance: 100
Referee: Richard O'Hanlon (Republic of Ireland)

Torpedo Kutaisi won 7–1 on aggregate.

27 June 1998

Ruch Chorzów (Poland)	2–2	Austria Wien
Śrutwa 58' (pen.); Bizacki 73'		Weiss 68'; Schreiber 79'

Stadion Miejski, Chorzów
Attendance: 2,500
Referee: Jouni Hyytiä (Finland)

Ruch Chorzów won 3–2 on aggregate.

27 June 1998

Omagh Town (Northern Ireland)	2–2	(Slovakia) Rimavská Sobota
Kavanagh 30'; Crilly 89'	Report	Ungvölgyi 43'; Přibyl 58'

Na Zahradkach Stadium, Rimavská Sobota
Attendance: 2,000
Referee: Henri Diederich (Luxembourg)

Rimavská Sobota won 3–2 on aggregate.

28 June 1998

Kongsvinger (Norway)	3–0	(Wales) Ebbw Vale
Ernstsson 69', 79'; Dybendal 74'	Report

Gjemselund Stadion, Kongsvinger
Attendance: 214
Referee: Oleg Timofejev (Estonia)

Kongsvinger won 9–1 on aggregate.

28 June 1998

Lyngby (Denmark)	0–1	(Croatia) Hrvatski Dragovoljac
	Report	Bazina 78'

Lyngby Stadion, Lyngby
Attendance: 650
Referee: Georgios Psychomanis (Greece)

Lyngby won 4–2 on aggregate.

28 June 1998

Sliema Wanderers (Malta)	2–3	(Hungary) Diósgyőr
Mráz 30', 55'		Kulcsár 43'; Domokos 75'; Kotula 89'

Hibernians Ground, Paola
Attendance: 179
Referee: Herbie Barr (Northern Ireland)

Diósgyőr won 5–2 on aggregate.

28 June 1998

Hradec Králové (Czech Republic)	2–1	(Luxembourg) Hobscheid
Černý 33'; Koubek 89'	Report	Delazzer 88'

Všesportovní stadion, Hradec Králové
Attendance: 1,218
Referee: Igor Horozhankin (Ukraine)

Hradec Králové won 2–1 on aggregate.

28 June 1998

Shamrock Rovers (Republic of Ireland)	3–2	(Turkey) Altay
Purdy 6'; Cousins 80'; Whelan 89'	Report	Alaçayır 75'; Brkić 90'

Tolka Park, Dublin
Attendance: 550
Referee: Bohdan Benedik (Slovakia)

Altay won 5–4 on aggregate.

28 June 1998

Sion (Switzerland)	2–3	(Finland) TPS
Derivaz 41'; Ouattara 85'	Report	Kaijasilta 10', 89'; Puhakainen 75'

Stade Tourbillon, Sion
Attendance: 1,350
Referee: Slavik Kazaryan (Armenia)

TPS 3–3 Sion on aggregate. TPS won on away goals rule.

28 June 1998

Baki Fahlasi (Azerbaijan)	1–0	(Lithuania) Inkaras Kaunas
Aliev 34'	Report
Penalties
Yagubaliev (penalty scored); Farzaliev (penalty scored); M. Aliev (penalty scored); Musatkin (penalty scored)	4–5	(penalty scored) Poškus; (penalty scored) Maciulevičius; (penalty scored) Butkus; (penalty scored) Puotkalis; (penalty scored) Rudžionis

Ismat Gayibov Stadium, Baku
Attendance: 3,000
Referee: Drago Kos (Slovenia)

Inkaras Kaunas 1–1 Baki Fahlasi on aggregate. Inkaras Kaunas won 5–4 on penalties.

== Second round ==
Team 1	Agg.	Team 2	1st leg	2nd leg
Werder Bremen (Germany)	5–1	(Lithuania) Inkaras Kaunas	4–1	1–0
TPS (Finland)	2–5	(Russia) Shinnik Yaroslavl	0–2	2–3
Boby Brno (Czech Republic)	5–5 (a)	(Spain) Espanyol	5–3	0–2
Akademisk Boldklub (Denmark)	3–3 (a)	(Ukraine) Vorskla Poltava	2–2	1–1
Austria Salzburg	3–2	(Switzerland) St. Gallen	3–1	0–1
Iraklis (Greece)	3–4	(Romania) Naţional București	3–1	0–3
Lommel (Belgium)	2–2 (a)	(Georgia (country)) Torpedo Kutaisi	0–1	2–1
Vojvodina (Federal Republic of Yugoslavia)	4–0	(Sweden) Örebro	2–0	2–0
Makedonija GP (North Macedonia)	1–7	(France) Bastia	1–0	0–7
Twente (Netherlands)	2–0	(Norway) Kongsvinger	2–0	0–0
Sampdoria (Italy)	2–1	(Slovakia) Rimavská Sobota	2–0	0–1
Samsunspor (Turkey)	4–3	(Denmark) Lyngby	3–0	1–3
Debrecen (Hungary)	(a)1–1	(Czech Republic) SK Hradec Králové	0–0	1–1
Altay (Turkey)	2–1	(Hungary) Diósgyőri FC	1–1	1–0
Örgryte (Sweden)	2–2 (a)	(Poland) Ruch Chorzów	2–1	0–1
OD Trenčín (Slovakia)	0–1	(Russia) Baltika	0–1	0–0

=== First leg ===
4 July 1998

Werder Bremen (Germany)	4–1	(Lithuania) Inkaras Kaunas
Bode 14', 43'; Skripnik 36'; Frings 69'	Report	Puotkalis 53'

Marschweg-Stadion, Oldenburg
Attendance: 2,400
Referee: Željko Širić (Croatia)

4 July 1998

Sampdoria (Italy)	2–0	(Slovakia) Rimavská Sobota
Palmieri 37'; Catê 67'	Report

Stadio Luigi Ferraris, Genoa
Attendance: 15,000
Referee: Stéphane Bre (France)

4 July 1998

Iraklis (Greece)	3–1	(Romania) Naţional București
Karadžov 2'; Konstantinou 71'; Kostis 88'	Report	Pogăcean 43'

Kaftanzoglio Stadium, Thessaloniki
Attendance: 1,000
Referee: Dieter Schoch (Switzerland)

4 July 1998

Vojvodina (Federal Republic of Yugoslavia)	2–0	(Sweden) Örebro
Drinčić 40' (pen.); Predić 48'	Report UEFA Report 2

Karađorđe Stadium, Novi Sad
Attendance: 1,500
Referee: Fritz Stuchlik (Austria)

4 July 1998

Makedonija GP (North Macedonia)	1–0	(France) Bastia
Naumoski 37'	Report

Gjorče Petrov Stadium, Skopje
Attendance: 2,000
Referee: İlhami Kaplan (Turkey)

4 July 1998

Altay (Turkey)	1–1	(Hungary) Diósgyőr
Sancak 30'		Jakab 51'

İzmir Alsancak Stadium, İzmir
Attendance: 3,880
Referee: Zdravko Savić (FR Yugoslavia)

4 July 1998

OD Trenčín (Slovakia)	0–1	(Russia) Baltika Kaliningrad
	Report	Vizyonok 57'

Štadión na Sihoti, Trenčín
Attendance: 2,384
Referee: Eduardo Iturralde González (Spain)

5 July 1998

Akademisk Boldklub (Denmark)	2–2	(Ukraine) Vorskla Poltava
Hermansen 65'; Schønnemann 78'	Report	Melashchenko 58'; Bohatyr 84'

Akademisk Skovdiget, Copenhagen
Attendance: 600
Referee: Michal Beneš (Czech Republic)

5 July 1998

Lommel (Belgium)	0–1	(Georgia (country)) Torpedo Kutaisi
	Report	Vachiberadze 30'

Soevereinstadion, Lommel
Attendance: 672
Referee: Jørn West Larsen (Denmark)

5 July 1998

Samsunspor (Turkey)	3–0	(Denmark) Lyngby
Dağdelen 35'; Mansız 48'; Aykut 90'

19 Mayıs Stadium, Samsun
Attendance: 5,011
Referee: Edgar Steinborn (Germany)

5 July 1998

Austria Salzburg	3–1	(Switzerland) St. Gallen
Kitzbichler 44'; Glieder 53', 61' (pen.)	Report	Vurens 84'

Stadion Lehen, Salzburg
Attendance: 1,500
Referee: Pasquale Rodomonti (Italy)

5 July 1998

Brno (Czech Republic)	5–3	(Spain) Espanyol
Siegl 30', 65'; Holomek 69', 76'; Švancara 85'		Răducioiu 44'; Nieto 51'; García 58'

Stadion Za Lužánkami, Brno
Attendance: 4,800
Referee: Jon Skjervold (Norway)

5 July 1998

TPS (Finland)	0–2	(Russia) Shinnik Yaroslavl
	Report	Leonchenko 27' (pen.); Vyazmikin 86'

Kupittaan jalkapallostadion, Turku
Attendance: 720
Referee: Kjell Alseth (Norway)

5 July 1998

Örgryte (Sweden)	2–1	(Poland) Ruch Chorzów
Sjöstedt 36', 83'		Śrutwa 75'

Ullevi, Gothenburg
Attendance: 418
Referee: Claus Bo Larsen (Denmark)

5 July 1998

Twente (Netherlands)	2–0	(Norway) Kongsvinger
ter Avest 21'; De Witte 51'	Report

Arke Stadion, Enschede
Attendance: 5,800
Referee: José Mendes Pratas (Portugal)

5 July 1998

Debrecen (Hungary)	0–0	(Czech Republic) Hradec Králové

Stadion Oláh Gábor Út, Debrecen
Attendance: 4,280
Referee: Mustafa Çulcu (Turkey)

=== Second leg ===
11 July 1998

Inkaras Kaunas (Lithuania)	0–1	(Germany) Werder Bremen
	Report UEFA Report 2	Herzog 88'

Inkaras Stadium, Kaunas
Attendance: 1,100
Referee: Kostadin Gerginov (Bulgaria)

Werder Bremen won 5–1 on aggregate.

11 July 1998

Rimavská Sobota (Slovakia)	1–0	(Italy) Sampdoria
Orabinec 2'	Report

Na Zahradkach Stadium, Rimavská Sobota
Attendance: 6,223
Referee: Steve Dunn (England)

Sampdoria won 2–1 on aggregate.

11 July 1998

Naţional București (Romania)	3–0	(Greece) Iraklis
Pigulea 55'; Savu 64'; Liţă 90'	Report

Stadionul Cotroceni, Bucharest
Attendance: 4,000
Referee: Frank De Bleeckere (Belgium)

Naţional București won 4–3 on aggregate.

11 July 1998

Örebro (Sweden)	0–2	(Federal Republic of Yugoslavia) Vojvodina
	Report	Janković 79', 89'

Eyravallen, Örebro
Attendance: 1,500
Referee: Yuri Baskakov (Russia)

Vojvodina won 4–0 on aggregate.

11 July 1998

Bastia (France)	7–0	(North Macedonia) Makedonija GP
André 9'; Née 13'; Laurent 50', 82' (pen.); Prince 62', 77'; Soumah 86'	Report

Stade Armand Cesari, Furiani
Attendance: 2,500
Referee: Paulo Paraty (Portugal)

Bastia won 7–1 on aggregate.

11 July 1998

Diósgyőr (Hungary)	0–1	(Turkey) Altay
		Dökme 55'

Diósgyőri Stadion, Miskolc
Attendance: 3,880
Referee: Per-Olof Ståhl (Sweden)

Altay won 2–1 on aggregate.

11 July 1998

Baltika Kaliningrad (Russia)	0–0	(Slovakia) OD Trenčín
	Report

Baltika Stadium, Kaliningrad
Attendance: 7,000
Referee: Lutz Michael Fröhlich (Germany)

Baltika Kaliningrad won 1–0 on aggregate.

11 July 1998

Vorskla Poltava (Ukraine)	1–1	(Denmark) Akademisk Boldklub
Musolitin 12'	Report	Nielsen 78'

Vorskla Stadium, Poltava
Attendance: 3,500
Referee: Attila Hanacsek (Hungary)

Akademisk Boldklub 3–3 Vorskla Poltava on aggregate. Vorskla Poltava won on away goals rule.

11 July 1998

Torpedo Kutaisi (Georgia (country))	1–2	(Belgium) Lommel
Kvetenadze 4'	Report	Szubert 8'; Cannaerts 17'

Givi Kiladze Stadium, Kutaisi
Attendance: 6,500
Referee: Andrei Butenko (Russia)

Lommel 2–2 Torpedo Kutaisi on aggregate. Lommel won on away goals rule.

11 July 1998

Lyngby (Denmark)	3–1	(Turkey) Samsunspor
Christensen 2'; Magleby 60'; Havlykke 90'		Aykut 61'

Lyngby Stadium, Lyngby
Attendance: 993
Referee: Dietmar Drabek (Austria)

Samsunspor won 4–3 on aggregate.

11 July 1998

St. Gallen (Switzerland)	1–0	Austria Salzburg
Zwyssig 90'	Report

Espenmoos, St. Gallen
Attendance: 1,700
Referee: Edo Trivković (Croatia)

Austria Salzburg won 3–2 on aggregate.

11 July 1998

Espanyol (Spain)	2–0	(Czech Republic) Brno
Fernández 51' (pen.); Tamudo 82'

Estadi de la Nova Creu Alta, Sabadell
Attendance: 3,250
Referee: Lawrence Sammut (Malta)

Brno 5–5 Espanyol on aggregate. Espanyol won on away goals rule.

11 July 1998

Shinnik Yaroslavl (Russia)	3–2	(Finland) TPS
Kazalov 42'; Yuminov 56'; Putilin 66'	Report	Puhakainen 11'; Kaijasilta 85'

Shinnik Stadium, Yaroslavl
Attendance: 5,800
Referee: Eyal Zur (Israel)

Shinnik Yaroslavl won 5–2 on aggregate.

11 July 1998

Ruch Chorzów (Poland)	1–0	(Sweden) Örgryte
Śrutwa 81'

Stadion Miejski, Chorzów
Attendance: 2,792
Referee: Zoran Arsić (FR Yugoslavia)

Örgryte 2–2 Ruch Chorzów on aggregate. Ruch Chorzów won on away goals rule.

12 July 1998

Kongsvinger (Norway)	0–0	(Netherlands) Twente
	Report

Gjemselund Stadion, Kongsvinger
Attendance: 356
Referee: Graham Barber (England)

Twente won 2–0 on aggregate.

12 July 1998

Hradec Králové (Czech Republic)	1–1	(Hungary) Debrecen
Jukl 21'		Csehi 62'

Všesportovní stadion, Hradec Králové
Attendance: 1,447
Referee: Mika Peltola (Finland)

Debrecen 1–1 Hradec Králové on aggregate. Debrecen won on away goals rule.

== Third round ==
Team 1	Agg.	Team 2	1st leg	2nd leg
Debrecen (Hungary)	3–2	(Germany) Hansa Rostock	1–1	2–1
Harelbeke (Belgium)	0–4	(Italy) Sampdoria	0–1	0–3
Auxerre (France)	1–2	(Spain) Espanyol	1–1	0–1
Ruch Chorzów (Poland)	2–2 (4–2 p)	(Portugal) Estrela da Amadora	1–1	1–1
Valencia (Spain)	4–2	(Russia) Shinnik Yaroslavl	4–1	0–1
Crystal Palace (England)	0–4	(Turkey) Samsunspor	0–2	0–2
Fortuna Sittard (Netherlands)	5–2	(Ukraine) Vorskla Poltava	3–0	2–2
Bologna (Italy)	3–3 (a)	(Romania) Naţional București	2–0	1–3
Bastia (France)	4–3	(Turkey) Altay	2–0	2–3 (aet)
Lommel (Belgium)	2–5	(Germany) Werder Bremen	1–3	1–2
Twente (Netherlands)	3–5	Austria Salzburg	2–2	1–3
Vojvodina (Federal Republic of Yugoslavia)	4–2	(Russia) Baltika	4–1	0–1

=== First leg ===
18 July 1998

Debrecen (Hungary)	1–1	(Germany) Hansa Rostock
Vadicska 50'	Report	Agali 85'

Stadion Oláh Gábor Út, Debrecen
Attendance: 5,000
Referee: Fiorenzo Treossi (Italy)

19 July 1998

Harelbeke (Belgium)	0–1	(Italy) Sampdoria
	Report	Montella 89' (pen.)

Forestierstadion, Harelbeke
Attendance: 4,000
Referee: Arturo Daudén Ibáñez (Spain)

18 July 1998

Auxerre (France)	1–1	(Spain) Espanyol
Carnot 79'	Report	Tamudo 60'

Stade de l'Abbé-Deschamps, Auxerre
Attendance: 5,000
Referee: Dermot Gallagher (England)

18 July 1998

Ruch Chorzów (Poland)	1–1	(Portugal) Estrela da Amadora
Bizacki 54'	Report	Nawrocki 60' (o.g.)

Stadion Miejski, Chorzów
Attendance: 2,000
Referee: Vladimír Hriňák (Slovakia)

18 July 1998

Bologna (Italy)	2–0	(Romania) Naţional București
Paramatti 4'; Ingesson 38'	Report

Stadio Renato Dall'Ara, Bologna
Attendance: 10,000
Referee: Sándor Piller (Hungary)

18 July 1998

Valencia (Spain)	4–1	(Russia) Shinnik Yaroslavl
Farinós 11'; Roche 25'; C. López 48', 87'	Report	Serebrennikov 50'

Mestalla Stadium, Valencia
Attendance: 3,500
Referee: Domenico Messina (Italy)

19 July 1998

Crystal Palace (England)	0–2	(Turkey) Samsunspor
	Report	Dağdelen 14'; Metin 56'

Selhurst Park, London
Attendance: 11,758
Referee: Roelof Luinge (Netherlands)

18 July 1998

Fortuna Sittard (Netherlands)	3–0	(Ukraine) Vorskla Poltava
Hamming 55', 68'; Paauwe 58'	Report

De Baandert, Sittard
Attendance: 1,786
Referee: Kyros Vassaras (Greece)

18 July 1998

Bastia (France)	2–0	(Turkey) Altay
Née 38'; Prince 61'	Report UEFA

Stade Armand Cesari, Furiani
Attendance: 2,500
Referee: Victor José Esquinas Torres (Spain)

18 July 1998

Lommel (Belgium)	1–3	(Germany) Werder Bremen
Mennes 44'	Report	Kunz 52', 73'; Bode 79'

Soevereinstadion, Lommel
Attendance: 6,000
Referee: Morgan Norman (Sweden)

18 July 1998

Twente (Netherlands)	2–2	Austria Salzburg
ten Caat 27'; Bosman 66'	Report	Laessig 12', 68'

De Grolsch Veste, Enschede
Attendance: 3,250
Referee: Vasily Melnichuk (Ukraine)

18 July 1998

Vojvodina (Federal Republic of Yugoslavia)	4–1	(Russia) Baltika Kaliningrad
Cilinšek 13'; Drinčić 50', 61', 89' (pen.)	Report	Fedkov 77'

Karađorđe Stadium, Novi Sad
Attendance: 3,500
Referee: Andreas Schluchter (Switzerland)

=== Second leg ===
25 July 1998

Hansa Rostock (Germany)	1–2	(Hungary) Debrecen
Pamić 83' (pen.)	Report	Dowe 50' (o.g.); Ilea 90+3' (pen.)

Ostseestadion, Rostock
Attendance: 4,500
Referee: Mike McCurry (Scotland)

Debrecen won 3–2 on aggregate.

25 July 1998

Sampdoria (Italy)	3–0	(Belgium) Harelbeke
Palmieri 32'; Montella 36', 84' (pen.)	Report

Stadio Luigi Ferraris, Genoa
Attendance: 10,500
Referee: Hermann Albrecht (Germany)

Sampdoria won 4–0 on aggregate.

25 July 1998

Espanyol (Spain)	1–0	(France) Auxerre
Nan Ribera 59'	Report

Estadi de la Nova Creu Alta, Sabadell
Attendance: 6,750
Referee: William Young (Scotland)

Espanyol won 2–1 on aggregate.

25 July 1998

Estrela da Amadora (Portugal)	1–1 (a.e.t.)	(Poland) Ruch Chorzów
Rui Neves 62'	Report	Bizacki 76'
Penalties
Leal (penalty scored); Carlitos (penalty scored); Gaúcho (penalty missed); Rui Neves (penalty missed)	2–4	Nawrocki (penalty scored); Surma (penalty scored); Mizia (penalty scored); Bizacki (penalty scored)

Estádio José Gomes, Amadora
Attendance: 3,000
Referee: Dick J.H. Van Egmond (Netherlands)

Ruch Chorzów 2–2 Estrela da Amadora on aggregate. Ruch Chorzów won 4–2 on penalties.

25 July 1998

Naţional București (Romania)	3–1	(Italy) Bologna
Pigulea 28', 71'; Pârlog 45'	Report	Kolyvanov 15' (pen.)

Stadionul Cotroceni, Bucharest
Attendance: 5,000
Referee: Rémi Harrel (France)

Bologna 3–3 Naţional București on aggregate. Bologna won on away goals rule.

25 July 1998

Shinnik Yaroslavl (Russia)	1–0	(Spain) Valencia
Yuminov 12'	Report

Shinnik Stadium, Yaroslavl
Attendance: 8,000
Referee: Knud Erik Fisker (Denmark)

Valencia won 4–2 on aggregate.

25 July 1998

Samsunspor (Turkey)	2–0	(England) Crystal Palace
Aykut 2', 89'	Report

19 Mayıs Stadium, Samsun
Attendance: 6,000
Referee: Gerd Grabher (Austria)

Samsunspor won 4–0 on aggregate.

25 July 1998

Vorskla Poltava (Ukraine)	2–2	(Netherlands) Fortuna Sittard
Musolitin 52'; Kobzar 89'	Report	Jeffrey 49'; Hamming 84'

Vorskla Stadium, Poltava
Attendance: 1,322
Referee: Fernand Meese (Belgium)

Fortuna Sittard won 5–2 on aggregate.

25 July 1998

Altay (Turkey)	3–2 (a.e.t.)	(France) Bastia
Akgül 66', 77'; Yis 107'	Report	Jurietti 92' (pen.), 103' (pen.)

İzmir Alsancak Stadium, İzmir
Attendance: 5,000
Referee: Alan Freeland (Scotland)

Bastia won 4–3 on aggregate.

25 July 1998

Werder Bremen (Germany)	2–1	(Belgium) Lommel
Frings 45'; Flo 60'	Report	Dekelver 72'

Marschweg-Stadion, Oldenburg
Attendance: 2,340
Referee: Livio Bazzoli (Italy)

Werder Bremen won 5–2 on aggregate.

25 July 1998

Austria Salzburg	3–1	(Netherlands) Twente
Szewczyk 2'; Glieder 6'; Hutter 58'	Report	ten Caat 49'

Stadion Lehen, Salzburg
Attendance: 3,500
Referee: Georg Dardenne (Germany)

Austria Salzburg won 5–3 on aggregate.

25 July 1998

Baltika Kaliningrad (Russia)	1–0	(Federal Republic of Yugoslavia) Vojvodina
R. Adzhindzhal 80'	Report

Baltika Stadium, Kaliningrad
Attendance: 5,000
Referee: René Temmink (Netherlands)

Vojvodina won 4–2 on aggregate.

== Semi-finals ==
Team 1	Agg.	Team 2	1st leg	2nd leg
Bastia (France)	2–4	(Federal Republic of Yugoslavia) Vojvodina	2–0	0–4
Bologna (Italy)	3–2	(Italy) Sampdoria	3–1	0–1
Fortuna Sittard (Netherlands)	3–4	Austria Salzburg	2–1	1–3
Ruch Chorzów (Poland)	4–0	(Hungary) Debrecen	1–0	3–0
Werder Bremen (Germany)	6–0	(Turkey) Samsunspor	3–0	3–0
Espanyol (Spain)	0–3	(Spain) Valencia	0–1	0–2

=== First leg ===
29 July 1998
21:00

Bastia (France)	2–0	(Federal Republic of Yugoslavia) Vojvodina
Née 15'; Laurent 42' (pen.)	Report

Stade Armand Cesari, Furiani
Attendance: 5,000
Referee: Jorge Coroado (Portugal)

29 July 1998
20:35

Bologna (Italy)	3–1	(Italy) Sampdoria
Andersson 1'; Paramatti 31'; Kolyvanov 90'	Report	Palmieri 17'

Stadio Renato Dall'Ara, Bologna
Attendance: 8,000
Referee: Juan Fernández Marin (Spain)

29 July 1998
20:00

Fortuna Sittard (Netherlands)	2–1	Austria Salzburg
Dirkx 15'; Hamming 45'	Report	Glieder 20' (pen.)

De Baandert, Sittard
Attendance: 3,000
Referee: Jacek Granat (Poland)

29 July 1998
17:30

Ruch Chorzów (Poland)	1–0	(Hungary) Debrecen
Surma 70'	Report

Stadion Ruchu, Chorzów
Attendance: 1,000
Referee: Alain Hamer (Luxembourg)

29 July 1998
18:15

Werder Bremen (Germany)	3–0	(Turkey) Samsunspor
Todt 25'; Bode 74'; Seidel 90'	Report

Marschweg-Stadion, Oldenburg
Attendance: 4,000
Referee: Claude Colombo (France)

29 July 1998
21:30

Espanyol (Spain)	0–1	(Spain) Valencia
	Report	C. López 44'

Estadi Olímpic de Montjuïc, Barcelona
Attendance: 15,200
Referee: Lutz Michael Fröhlich (Germany)

=== Second leg ===
5 August 1998
20:00

Vojvodina (Federal Republic of Yugoslavia)	4–0	(France) Bastia
Drinčić 45', 80'; Janković 73'; Dragić 90'	Report

Karađorđe Stadium, Novi Sad
Attendance: 10,000
Referee: Ľuboš Micheľ (Slovakia)

Vojvodina won 4–2 on aggregate.

5 August 1998
20:45

Sampdoria (Italy)	1–0	(Italy) Bologna
Palmieri 27'	Report UEFA Report 2

Stadio Luigi Ferraris, Genoa
Attendance: 14,000
Referee: Atanas Uzunov (Bulgaria)

Bologna won 3–2 on aggregate.

5 August 1998
18:00

Austria Salzburg	3–1	(Netherlands) Fortuna Sittard
Koejoe 15'; Sabitzer 62'; Glieder 76' (pen.)	Report	Burke 52'

Stadion Lehen, Salzburg
Attendance: 3,500
Referee: Charles Agius (Malta)

Austria Salzburg won 4–3 on aggregate.

5 August 1998
17:00

Debrecen (Hungary)	0–3	(Poland) Ruch Chorzów
	Report	Bizacki 22', 25'; Śrutwa 50'

Stadion Oláh Gábor Út, Debrecen
Attendance: 6,000
Referee: Alain Hamer (Luxembourg)

Ruch Chorzów won 4–0 on aggregate.

5 August 1998
20:00

Samsunspor (Turkey)	0–3	(Germany) Werder Bremen
	Report	Flo 45'; Wicky 77'; Frings 79'

19 Mayıs Stadium, Samsun
Attendance: 15,000
Referee: Terje Hauge (Norway)

Werder Bremen won 6–0 on aggregate.

5 August 1998
21:30

Valencia (Spain)	2–0	(Spain) Espanyol
C. López 40', 79'	Report

Mestalla Stadium, Valencia
Attendance: 40,000
Referee: Graham Poll (England)

Valencia won 3–0 on aggregate.

== Finals ==
Team 1	Agg.	Team 2	1st leg	2nd leg
Austria Salzburg	1–4	(Spain) Valencia	0–2	1–2
Werder Bremen (Germany)	2–1	(Federal Republic of Yugoslavia) Vojvodina	1–0	1–1
Bologna (Italy)	3–0	(Poland) Ruch Chorzów	1–0	2–0

=== First leg ===
11 August 1998
19:00

Austria Salzburg	0–2	(Spain) Valencia
	Report	Angulo 6'; Schwarz 44'

Stadion Lehen, Salzburg
Attendance: 6,000
Referee: Metin Tokat (Turkey)

11 August 1998
20:15

Werder Bremen (Germany)	1–0	(Federal Republic of Yugoslavia) Vojvodina
Frey 75'	Report UEFA Report 2

Weserstadion, Bremen
Attendance: 15,276
Referee: Leslie Irvine (Northern Ireland)

11 August 1998
20:45

Bologna (Italy)	1–0	(Poland) Ruch Chorzów
Kolyvanov 45'	Report

Stadio Renato Dall'Ara, Bologna
Attendance: 5,866
Referee: Hartmut Strampe (Germany)

=== Second leg ===
25 August 1998
22:00

Valencia (Spain)	2–1	Austria Salzburg
Lucarelli 17'; Roche 36'	Report	Hütter 84'

Mestalla Stadium, Valencia
Attendance: 40,000
Referee: Karl-Erik Nilsson (Sweden)

Valencia won 4–1 on aggregate.

25 August 1998
20:30

Vojvodina (Federal Republic of Yugoslavia)	1–1	(Germany) Werder Bremen
Bratić 23'	Report	Frings 61'

Karađorđe Stadium, Novi Sad
Attendance: 16,000
Referee: Juan Manuel Brito Arceo (Spain)

Werder Bremen won 2–1 on aggregate.

25 August 1998
16:00

Ruch Chorzów (Poland)	0–2	(Italy) Bologna
	Report	Kolyvanov 60' (pen.); Signori 90'

Stadion Ruchu, Chorzów
Attendance: 5,000
Referee: Claude Colombo (France)

Bologna won 3–0 on aggregate.

== See also ==
- 1998–99 UEFA Champions League
- 1998–99 UEFA Cup Winners' Cup
