= 1997–98 Galatasaray S.K. season =

Galatasaray
1997–98 season
- President: Faruk Süren
- Head coach: Fatih Terim
- Stadium: Ali Sami Yen Stadı
- 1. Lig: 1st
- Turkish Cup: Runners-up
- UEFA Champions League: Group stage
- Turkish Super Cup: Runners-up
- Top goalscorer: League: Hakan Şükür (32); All: Hakan Şükür (34)
- Highest home attendance: 30,482 vs İstanbulspor (1. Lig, 3 May 1998)
- Lowest home attendance: 14,000 vs Parma (CL, 10 December 1997)
- Average home league attendance: 26,330
Home colours	Away colours

The 1997–98 season was Galatasaray's 94th in existence and its 40th consecutive season in the 1. Lig. This article shows statistics of the club's players in the season, and also lists all matches that the club have played in the season.

== Squad statistics ==
No.	Pos.	Name	1. Lig		Türkiye Kupası		CL		Süper Kupa		Total	
No.	Pos.	Name	Apps	Goals	Apps	Goals	Apps	Goals	Apps	Goals	Apps	Goals
-	GK	(Turkey) Volkan Kilimci	20	0	2	0	8	0	0	0	30	0
-	GK	(Turkey) Mehmet Bölükbaşi	15	0	6	0	0	0	1	0	22	0
-	GK	(Ghana) Richard Kingson	0	0	0	0	0	0	0	0	0	0
-	DF	(Turkey) Adnan İlgin	1	0	0	0	1	0	0	0	2	0
-	DF	(Turkey) Feti Okuroğlu	5	0	2	0	1	0	1	0	9	0
-	DF	(Romania) Iulian Filipescu	24	1	5	0	5	0	0	0	34	1
4	DF	(Romania) Gheorghe Popescu	32	2	8	2	8	0	0	0	48	4
3	DF	(Turkey) Bülent Korkmaz (C)	29	1	7	0	8	0	0	0	44	1
-	DF	(Turkey) Fatih Akyel	31	5	8	0	8	1	1	0	48	6
-	DF	(Turkey) Vedat İnceefe	8	0	1	0	3	0	1	0	13	0
11	DF	(Turkey) Hakan Ünsal	27	3	5	0	5	0	1	0	38	3
67	MF	(Turkey) Ergün Penbe	27	1	5	0	8	1	1	0	41	2
7	MF	(Turkey) Okan Buruk	24	5	8	1	2	0	1	0	35	6
-	MF	(Turkey) Mehmet Gönülaçar	11	1	2	1	1	0	1	1	15	3
-	MF	(Turkey) Osman Coşkun	14	1	5	0	4	0	1	0	24	1
-	MF	(Turkey) Tugay Kerimoğlu	30	2	7	1	8	2	1	0	46	5
-	MF	(Turkey) Suat Kaya	21	2	5	1	2	1	1	0	29	3
-	MF	(Turkey) Emre Belözoğlu	23	2	8	0	2	0	1	0	34	2
22	MF	(Turkey) Ümit Davala	15	3	3	0	6	0	0	0	24	3
10	MF	(Romania) Gheorghe Hagi	30	8	6	0	6	0	0	0	42	8
-	FW	(Turkey) Ceyhun Eriş	1	0	0	0	0	0	0	0	1	0
6	FW	(Turkey) Arif Erdem	33	9	7	2	8	1	1	0	49	12
-	FW	(Romania) Adrian Ilie	12	6	0	0	7	5	0	0	19	11
-	FW	(Romania) Ionuț Luțu	3	0	2	0	0	0	0	0	5	0
9	FW	(Turkey) Hakan Şükür	34	32	8	2	7	0	1	0	50	34

=== Players in / out ===
==== In ====
Pos.	Nat.	Name	Age	Moving from
DF	(Romania)	Gheorghe Popescu	30	Barcelona
MF	(Turkey)	Mehmet Gönülaçar	25	Gaziantepspor
MF	(Turkey)	Adnan İlgin	24	Adıyamanspor
MF	(Turkey)	Osman Coşkun	25	Gençlerbirliği
MF	(Turkey)	Emre Belözoğlu	17	Galatasaray A2
FW	(Romania)	Ionuț Luțu	22	Universitatea Craiova
GK	(Turkey)	Mehmet Bölükbaşi	19	Akçaabat Sebatspor
GK	(Ghana)	Richard Kingson	19	Galatasaray A2

==== Out ====
Pos.	Nat.	Name	Age	Moving to
DF	(Turkey)	Cihat Arslan	27	Gaziantepspor
FW	(Turkey)	Alp Küçükvardar	21	Gaziantepspor
MF	(Turkey)	İlyas Kahraman	21	Gaziantepspor
MF	(Turkey)	Ceyhun Eriş	20	Göztepe on loan
MF	(Turkey)	Ufuk Talay	20	Kardemir Karabükspor on loan
DF	(Turkey)	Mert Korkmaz	26	Kocaelispor
DF	(Turkey)	Bekir Gür	25	Çanakkale Dardanel
FW	(Romania)	Adrian Ilie	23	Valencia

== 1. Lig ==
=== Standings ===
Pos	Team	Pld	W	D	L	GF	GA	GD	Pts	Qualification or relegation
1	Galatasaray (C)	34	23	6	5	86	43	+43	75	Qualification to Champions League second qualifying round
2	Fenerbahçe	34	21	8	5	61	25	+36	71	Qualification to UEFA Cup second qualifying round
3	Trabzonspor	34	19	9	6	68	42	+26	66	Qualification to UEFA Cup second qualifying round
4	İstanbulspor	34	14	12	8	60	42	+18	54	Qualification to UEFA Cup second qualifying round
5	Samsunspor	34	14	7	13	42	42	0	49	Qualification to Intertoto Cup second round

Rules for classification: 1) points; 2) goal difference; 3) number of goals scored.
(C) Champions

=== Matches ===
1 August 1997 1	Ankaragücü	0–0	Galatasaray	Ankara
20:00 EET		Report		Stadium: Ankara 19 Mayıs Stadium; Referee: İlhami Kaplan

9 August 1997 2	Galatasaray	4–0	Bursaspor	Istanbul
20:00 EET	Ilie 23', 38', 89'; Şükür 73'	Report		Stadium: Ali Sami Yen Stadı; Attendance: ? Referee: Erol Ersoy

24 August 1997 3	Kocaelispor	1–1	Galatasaray	İzmit
19:00 EET	Dąbrowski 65'	Report	Filipescu 73'	Stadium: İsmet Paşa Stadium; Referee: Ahmet Çakar

31 August 1997 4	Galatasaray	6–2	Vanspor	Istanbul
19:00 EET	Akyel 3'; Şükür 13', 21'; Ilie 37', 49'; Erdem 83'	Report	Karaca 78', 85'	Stadium: Ali Sami Yen Stadı; Attendance: 22,337; Referee: Yılnur Önen

5 September 1997 5	Fenerbahçe	3–1	Galatasaray	Istanbul
20:00 EET	Korkut 13'; Bolić 69' (pen.); Okocha 70'	Report	Kerimoğlu 60'	Stadium: Şükrü Saracoğlu Stadium; Attendance: 26,000; Referee: Muhittin Boşat

14 September 1997 6	Galatasaray	2–1	Antalyaspor	Istanbul
19:00 EET	Korkmaz 52'; Erdem 58'	Report	N'Gole 46'	Stadium: Ali Sami Yen Stadı; Attendance: 23,152; Referee: Metin Tokat

21 September 1997 7	Beşiktaş	2–1	Galatasaray	Istanbul
19:00 EET	Özdilek 3'; Amokachi 71'	Report	Şükür 78'	Stadium: İnönü Stadium; Attendance: 31,600; Referee: Mustafa Çulcu

27 September 1997 8	Galatasaray	4–1	Çamlıdere Şekerspor	Istanbul
19:00 EET	Popescu 27'; Akyel 43'; Hagi 79'; Buruk 87'	Report	Moukhar 69'	Stadium: Ali Sami Yen Stadı; Attendance: ? Referee: Sadık İlhan

5 October 1997 9	Gençlerbirliği	3–2	Galatasaray	Ankara
19:00 EET	Sözeri 37'; Karan 40'; Geremi 64'	Report	Şükür 26', 53'	Stadium: Ankara 19 Mayıs Stadium; Referee: İbrahim Aksoy

18 October 1997 10	Galatasaray	1–0	Gaziantepspor	Istanbul
19:00 EET	Hagi 30'	Report		Stadium: Ali Sami Yen Stadı; Attendance: ? Referee: Oğuz Sarvan

1 November 1997 11	Samsunspor	0–2	Galatasaray	Samsun
19:00 EET		Report	Şükür 15'; Ilie 55'	Stadium: Samsun 19 Mayıs Stadium; Referee: Erol Ersoy

8 November 1997 12	Galatasaray	2–2	Trabzonspor	Istanbul
19:00 EET	Ünsal 72'; Coşkun 78'	(Report)	Mandıralı 32', 66'	Stadium: Ali Sami Yen Stadı; Attendance: 30,000; Referee: İlhami Kaplan

16 November 1997 13	Altay	4–5	Galatasaray	İzmir
19:00 EET	Dökme 49'; Tekke 54', 68', 72'	Report	Şükür 15', 48' (pen.), 50', 70'; Erdem 25'	Stadium: İzmir Atatürk Stadium; Referee: Ayhan Yücebilgiç

23 November 1997 14	Galatasaray	1–0	Çanakkale Dardanelspor	Istanbul
19:00 EET	Hagi 68'	(Report)		Stadium: Ali Sami Yen Stadı; Attendance: 30,000; Referee: Metin Tokat

6 December 1997 15	Kayserispor	1–2	Galatasaray	Adana
19:00 EET	Dağdelen 65' (pen.)	Report	Davala 18'; Şükür 43'	Stadium: Adana 5 Ocak Stadium; Referee: Murat Ilgaz

13 December 1997 16	Istanbulspor	2–1	Galatasaray	Istanbul
19:00 EET	Akyüz 51'; Hamzaoğlu 60'	(Report)	Buruk 44'	Stadium: İnönü Stadium; Attendance: 12,563; Referee: Erol Ersoy

21 December 1997 17	Galatasaray	3–0	KDÇ Karabükspor	Istanbul
19:00 EET	Şükür 19', 78', 85'	(Report)		Stadium: Ali Sami Yen Stadı; Attendance: 20,000; Referee: Serdar Tatlı

18 January 1998 18	Galatasaray	2–1	Ankaragücü	Istanbul
19:00 EET	Şükür 38'; Kaya 63'	Report	Coulibaly 40'	Stadium: Ali Sami Yen Stadı; Attendance: ? Referee: Ayhan Yücebilgiç

25 January 1998 19	Bursaspor	3–2	Galatasaray	Bursa
19:00 EET	Vidolov 33'; Kolgu 52'; Baljić 89'	(Report)	Şükür 42'; Davala 81'	Stadium: Bursa Atatürk Stadı; Referee: İlhami Kaplan

1 February 1998 20	Galatasaray	2–0	Kocaelispor	Istanbul
19:00 EET	Şükür 77'; Davala 81'	Report		Stadium: Ali Sami Yen Stadı; Attendance: 30,358; Referee: Metin Tokat

7 February 1998 21	Vanspor	0–3	Galatasaray	Van
12:30 EET		(Report)	Erdem 4', 75'; Popescu 38'	Stadium: Atatürk Stadı; Referee: Ayhan Yücebilgiç

15 February 1998 22	Galatasaray	2–2	Fenerbahçe	Istanbul
19:00 EET	Hagi 42' (pen.); Ünsal 52'	Report	Okocha 32'; Bolić 86'	Stadium: Ali Sami Yen Stadı; Attendance: 30,000; Referee: Oğuz Sarvan

22 February 1998 23	Antalyaspor	1–3	Galatasaray	Antalya
19:00 EET	N'Gole 4'	(Report)	Şükür 40', 70'; Hagi 44'	Stadium: Atatürk Stadı; Referee: Sadık İlhan

1 March 1998 24	Galatasaray	3–2	Beşiktaş	Istanbul
19:00 EET	Hagi 20'; Ünsal 47'; Belözoğlu 79'	Report	Özdilek 30', 54'	Stadium: Ali Sami Yen Stadı; Attendance: 26,860; Referee: Erol Ersoy

7 March 1998 25	Çamlıdere Şekerspor	2–4	Galatasaray	Ankara
19:00 EET	Özer 2'; Aydın 42' (pen.)	Report	Kerimoğlu 24'; Akyel 62'; Şükür 66'; Belözoğlu 83'	Stadium: Ankara 19 Mayıs Stadium; Referee: Ünsal Çimen

15 March 1997 26	Galatasaray	3–1	Gençlerbirliği	Istanbul
19:00 EET	Şükür 45', 69'; Erdem 63'	Report	Özat 81'	Stadium: Ali Sami Yen Stadı; Attendance: 25,000; Referee: Kadir Tozlu

21 March 1998 27	Gaziantepspor	1–1	Galatasaray	Gaziantep
19:00 EET	Sarman 82'	Report	Şükür 54'	Stadium: Kamil Ocak Stadium; Referee: Murat Ilgaz

29 March 1998 28	Galatasaray	2–1	Samsunspor	Istanbul
19:00 EET	Erdem 13'; Kaya 48'	Report	Aykut 65'	Stadium: Ali Sami Yen Stadı; Attendance: ? Referee: Metin Tokat

4 April 1998 29	Trabzonspor	1–1	Galatasaray	Trabzon
19:00 EET	Mandıralı 35'	Report	Buruk 32'	Stadium: Hüseyin Avni Aker Stadium; Referee: Oğuz Sarvan

12 April 1998 30	Galatasaray	6–1	Altay	Istanbul
19:00 EET	Hagi 34'; Şükür 41', 65', 85'; Arayıcı 48' (o.g.); Gönülaçar 89'	Report	Ateş 63'	Stadium: Ali Sami Yen Stadı; Attendance: ? Referee: Ali Aydın

18 April 1998 31	Çanakkale Dardanelspor	1–2	Galatasaray	Çanakkale
15:30 EET	Musisi 36'	(Report)	Hagi 41'; Şükür 81'	Stadium: 18 Mart Stadı; Referee: Erol Ersoy

26 April 1998 32	Galatasaray	5–1	Kayserispor	Istanbul
19:00 EET	Şükür 21'; Akyel 59'; Penbe 63'; Buruk 68'; Doğan 89' (o.g.)	Report	Mkhalele 62'	Stadium: Ali Sami Yen Stadı; Attendance: 21,441; Referee: Ali Uluyol

3 May 1998 33	Galatasaray	4–1	Istanbulspor	Istanbul
16:30 EET	Buruk 55'; Şükür 60', 78'; Erdem 72'	Report	Özdemir 43' (pen.)	Stadium: Ali Sami Yen Stadı; Attendance: 30,482; Referee: Muhittin Boşat

9 May 1998 34	KDÇ Karabükspor	2–3	Galatasaray	İzmir
19:00 EET	Repuh 24'; Haşlak 74'	Report	Şükür 29'; Akyel 61'; Erdem 64'	Stadium: İzmir Atatürk Stadium; Attendance: 60,000; Referee: İbrahim Aksoy

== Türkiye Kupası ==
Kick-off listed in local time (EET)

=== Sixth round ===
3 December 1997 1	Galatasaray	2–1	Vanspor	Istanbul
20:00 EET	Gönülaçar 83'; Şükür 87'	(Report)	Phiri 36'	Stadium: Ali Sami Yen Stadı; Referee: Ali Uluyol

17 December 1997 2	Vanspor	0–0	Galatasaray	Van
12:30 EET		(Report)		Stadium: Van Atatürk Stadı; Referee: Bülent Uzun

=== Quarter-final ===
28 January 1998 1	Galatasaray	2–0	Gaziantepspor	Istanbul
21:00 EET	Kerimoğlu 35'; Popescu 70'	(Report)		Stadium: Ali Sami Yen Stadı; Referee: Ali Uluyol

11 February 1998 2	Gaziantepspor	1–0	Galatasaray	Gaziantep
21:00 EET	Kahraman 20'	(Report)		Stadium: Kamil Ocak Stadı; Referee: İbrahim Aksoy

=== Semi-final ===
25 February 1998 1	Trabzonspor	0–0	Galatasaray	Trabzon
19:00 EET		(Report)		Stadium: Hüseyin Avni Aker Stadı; Referee: Kadir Tozlu

11 March 1998 2	Galatasaray	4–2	Trabzonspor	Istanbul
14:00 EET	Popescu 38'; Erdem 49'; Şükür 61'; Kaya 87'	(Report)	Mandıralı 11', 22'	Stadium: Ali Sami Yen Stadı; Referee: Sadık İlhan

=== Final ===
25 March 1998 1	Beşiktaş	1–1	Galatasaray	Istanbul
20:30 EET	Sağlam 85'	(Report)	Buruk 61'	Stadium: İnönü Stadı; Referee: Orhan Erdemir

8 April 1998 2	Galatasaray	1–1	Beşiktaş	Istanbul
19:00 EET	Erdem 71'	(Report)	Özdilek 44'	Stadium: Ali Sami Yen Stadı; Attendance: 26,000; Referee: Erol Ersoy

== UEFA Champions League ==
=== Second qualifying round ===
13 August 1997 1	Sion	1–4	Galatasaray	Sion
	Lonfat 32'	(Report)	Luiz de Sousa Milton 4'; Erdem 9'; Ilie 60'; Kaya 85'	Stadium: Stade Tourbillon; Referee: (Russia) Nikolay Levnikov

27 August 1997 2	Galatasaray	4–1	Sion	Istanbul
	Ilie 40', 52', 56'; Akyel 62'	(Report)	Ouattara 70'	Stadium: Ali Sami Yen Stadı; Referee: (Netherlands) Mario Van Der Ende

=== Group stage ===
Pos	Team	Pld	W	D	L	GF	GA	GD	Pts	Qualification
1	(Germany) Borussia Dortmund	6	5	0	1	14	3	+11	15	Advance to knockout stage
2	(Italy) Parma	6	2	3	1	6	5	+1	9	
3	(Czech Republic) Sparta Prague	6	1	2	3	6	11	−5	5	
4	(Turkey) Galatasaray	6	1	1	4	4	11	−7	4	

Source: UEFA

17 September 1997 1	Galatasaray	0–1	Borussia Dortmund	Istanbul
21:45 EET		(Report)	Chapuisat 73'	Stadium: Ali Sami Yen Stadı; Attendance: 23,000; Referee: (Spain) José María García-Aranda

1 October 1997 2	Parma	2–0	Galatasaray	Parma
21:45 EET	Sensini 24'; Crespo 39'	(Report)		Stadium: Stadio Ennio Tardini; Attendance: 5,922; Referee: (Switzerland) Serge Muhmenthaler

22 October 1997 3	Sparta Prague	3–0	Galatasaray	Prague
21:45 EET	Siegl 34'; Gabriel 66'; Obajdin 87'	(Report)		Stadium: Stadion Letná; Attendance: 11,100; Referee: (England) David Roland Elleray

5 November 1997 4	Galatasaray	2–0	Sparta Prague	Istanbul
21:45 EET	Kerimoğlu 58', 86'	(Report)		Stadium: Ali Sami Yen Stadı; Attendance: 15,000; Referee: (Belgium) Michel Piraux

26 November 1997 5	Borussia Dortmund	4–1	Galatasaray	Dortmund
21:45 EET	But 22'; Herrlich 34'; Zorc 48', 86' (pen.)	(Report)	Penbe 87'	Stadium: Westfalenstadion; Attendance: 45,000; Referee: (Norway) Rune Pedersen

10 December 1997 6	Galatasaray	1–1	Parma	Istanbul
21:45 EET	Ilie 52'	(Report)	Chiesa 47'	Stadium: Ali Sami Yen Stadı; Attendance: 14,000; Referee: (Hungary) László Vágner

== Süper Kupa-Cumhurbaşkanlığı Kupası ==
Kick-off listed in local time (EET)

15 May 1998	Galatasaray	1–2	Beşiktaş	Ankara
20:00 EET	Gönülaçar 67'	(Report)	Amokachi 17'; Kahveci 113'	Stadium: 19 Mayıs Stadı; Attendance: 11,962; Referee: Erol Ersoy

== Friendly matches ==
Kick-off listed in local time (EET)

=== TSYD Kupası ===
18 July 1997 1	Beşiktaş	0–6	Galatasaray	Istanbul
20:30 EET		(Report)	Ilie 18', 20', 51'; Kaya 63', 89'; Ünsal 83'	Stadium: İnönü Stadı; Attendance: 7,164; Referee: Orhan Erdemir

20 July 1997 2	Galatasaray	4–2	Fenerbahçe	Istanbul
20:00 EET	Hagi 26'; Davala 39'; Penbe 53'; Ünsal 83'	(Report)	Bolić 69'; Sancaklı 90' (pen.)	Stadium: Ali Sami Yen Stadı; Attendance: 32,615; Referee: Serdar Çakır

== Attendance ==
Competition	Av. Att.	Total Att.
1. Lig	26,330	289,630
Türkiye Kupası	26,000	26,000
Champions League	17,333	52,000
Total	24,509	367,630
