= Putilin =

Putilin (Russian: Путилин) is a Russian masculine surname, its feminine counterpart is Putilina. It may refer to

- Maksim Putilin (born 1966), Russian football player
- Roman Putilin (born 1990), Russian football player
- Sergei Putilin (born 1986), Russian football player
