= Přibyl =

Přibyl (feminine: Přibylová) is a Czech surname. It may refer to:

- Daniel Přibyl (born 1992), Czech ice hockey player
- Josef Přibyl (1904–1968), Czech wrestler
- Josef Přibyl (1947–2026), Czech chess master
- Karel Přibyl (1899–1968), Czech athlete
- Luboš Přibyl (born 1964), Czech football player
- Miroslava Pribylova (born 1970), Canadian volleyball player
- Roman Přibyl (born 1973), Czech football player
- Stanislav Přibyl (born 1971), Czech Catholic clergyman
- Vendula Přibylová (born 1996), Czech ice hockey player
- Vilém Přibyl (1925–1990), Czech operatic tenor
