= Christian Schreiber =

Christian Schreiber may refer to:

- Christian Schreiber (philosopher) (1781–1857)
- Christian Schreiber (footballer) (born 1977), Austrian footballer
- Christian Schreiber (rower) (born 1980), German rower
