= Drinčić =

Drinčić (Serbian Cyrillic: Дринчић, pronounced [drîːntʃitɕ]) is a Serbo-Croatian surname. Notable people with the surname include:

- Milić Drinčić (1775 - 1815), Serbian nobleman and revolutionary
- Miloš Drinčić (born 1999), Montenegrin footballer
- Nikola Drinčić (born 1984), Montenegrin footballer
- Zdravko Drinčić (born 1972), Montenegrin footballer
