= Leo Lerinc =

Serbian footballer

Personal information
- Full name: Leo Lerinc
- Date of birth: 30 December 1975 (age 50)
- Place of birth: Novi Sad, SFR Yugoslavia
- Height: 1.89 m (6 ft 2 in)
- Position: Midfielder

Youth career
- Vojvodina

Senior career*
Years	Team	Apps	(Gls)
1994–1998	Vojvodina	47	(11)
1999–2002	Red Star Belgrade	85	(9)
2002–2003	St. Gallen	13	(1)
2004	Ciudad Murcia	6	(1)
2005	Ethnikos Achna	5	(1)
2006	Dinamo București	1	(0)
2007	Vojvodina	2	(0)
Total		159	(23)
- * Club domestic league appearances and goals

Leo Lerinc (Serbian Cyrillic: Лео Леринц; born 30 December 1975) is a Serbian former footballer who played as a midfielder.

== Career ==
A graduate of the youth system at his hometown club Vojvodina, Lerinc made his first-team debut in 1994. He was a regular member of the team that reached the finals of the 1998 UEFA Intertoto Cup. During the 1999 winter transfer window, Lerinc signed with Red Star Belgrade. He spent three and a half seasons at Marakana, winning two championship titles and three national cup trophies.

In August 2002, Lerinc moved abroad and joined Swiss side St. Gallen. He made 13 league appearances and scored one goal in the 2002–03 season, as the club suffered relegation from the top flight. After six months without competitive football, Lerinc signed with Spanish side Ciudad Murcia in January 2004.

In October 2007, just four months upon his return to Vojvodina, Lerinc announced his retirement from football due to chronic injuries.

== Personal life ==
Lerinc is the son of a former professional footballer Laslo Lerinc.

== Honours ==
Red Star Belgrade

- First League of FR Yugoslavia: 1999–2000, 2000–01
- FR Yugoslavia Cup: 1998–99, 1999–2000, 2001–02

Dinamo București

- Liga I: 2006–07
