= Oleh Kastornyi =

Ukrainian footballer

Personal information
- Full name: Oleh Viktorovych Kastornyi
- Date of birth: 29 August 1970 (age 56)
- Place of birth: Kharkiv, Ukrainian SSR
- Height: 1.78 m (5 ft 10 in)
- Position: Defender

Youth career
- FC Metalist Kharkiv

Senior career*
Years	Team	Apps	(Gls)
1987–1995	FC Metalist Kharkiv	105	(2)
1995–1996	FC Shakhtar Donetsk	2	(0)
1995	→ FC Shakhtar-2 Donetsk	9	(0)
1996–1997	FC Metallurg Lipetsk	78	(2)
1998	FC Baltika Kaliningrad	10	(0)
1999–2001	FC Fakel Voronezh	72	(0)
2002	FC Metallurg Krasnoyarsk	27	(0)
2003–2004	FC Hazovyk-KhGV Kharkiv	26	(0)
- * Club domestic league appearances and goals

Oleh Viktorovych Kastornyi (Ukrainian: Олег Вікторович Касторний; born 29 August 1970) is a Ukrainian former professional footballer.

== Club career ==
He made his professional debut in the Soviet Top League in 1990 for FC Metalist Kharkiv. He played 3 games and scored 1 goal in the 1998 UEFA Intertoto Cup for FC Baltika Kaliningrad.
