= Aleksei Kazalov =

Russian footballer and coach

Personal information
- Full name: Aleksei Nikolayevich Kazalov
- Date of birth: 3 February 1967 (age 59)
- Place of birth: Yaroslavl, Russian SFSR
- Height: 1.75 m (5 ft 9 in)
- Position: Midfielder

Team information
- Current team: FC Shinnik Yaroslavl (asst manager)

Senior career*
Years	Team	Apps	(Gls)
1992–1994	FC Vympel Rybinsk	101	(13)
1995–1999	FC Shinnik Yaroslavl	144	(8)
2000	FC Arsenal Tula	5	(0)
2000	FC Amkar Perm	9	(0)

Managerial career
- 2003: FSC Rybinsk
- 2007: FSC Rybinsk
- 2012–2022: FC Shinnik Yaroslavl (assistant)
- 2020: FC Shinnik Yaroslavl (caretaker)
- 2023–: FC Shinnik Yaroslavl (assistant)
- * Club domestic league appearances and goals

Aleksei Nikolayevich Kazalov (Russian: Алексей Николаевич Казалов; born 3 February 1967) is a Russian professional football coach and a former player who works as an assistant manager with FC Shinnik Yaroslavl.

He made his professional debut in the Russian Second Division in 1992 for FC Vympel Rybinsk. He played 4 games and scored 1 goal in the UEFA Intertoto Cup 1998 for FC Shinnik Yaroslavl.
