= Sergei Yuminov =

Russian footballer

Personal information
- Full name: Sergei Nikolayevich Yuminov
- Date of birth: 27 June 1970 (age 56)
- Place of birth: Izhevsk, Russian SFSR
- Height: 1.80 m (5 ft 11 in)
- Position: Forward

Youth career
- Izhplaneta Izhevsk

Senior career*
Years	Team	Apps	(Gls)
1992	FC Energiya Chaykovsky	10	(0)
1992–1993	FC Zenit Izhevsk	39	(4)
1994–1997	FC Gazovik-Gazprom Izhevsk	110	(37)
1998	FC Shinnik Yaroslavl	22	(3)
1999	FC Uralan Elista	0	(0)
2000	FC Fakel Voronezh	27	(5)
2001	FC Sokol Saratov	4	(0)

Managerial career
- 2006: FC Soyuz-Gazprom Izhevsk (administrator)
- * Club domestic league appearances and goals

Sergei Nikolayevich Yuminov (Russian: Серге́й Николаевич Юминов; born 27 June 1970) is a former Russian professional footballer.

== Club career ==
He made his professional debut in the Russian Second Division in 1992 for FC Energiya Chaykovsky. He played 4 games and scored 2 goals in the UEFA Intertoto Cup 1998 with FC Shinnik Yaroslavl.
