= Za Lužánkami Stadium =

Football stadium in Czech Republic

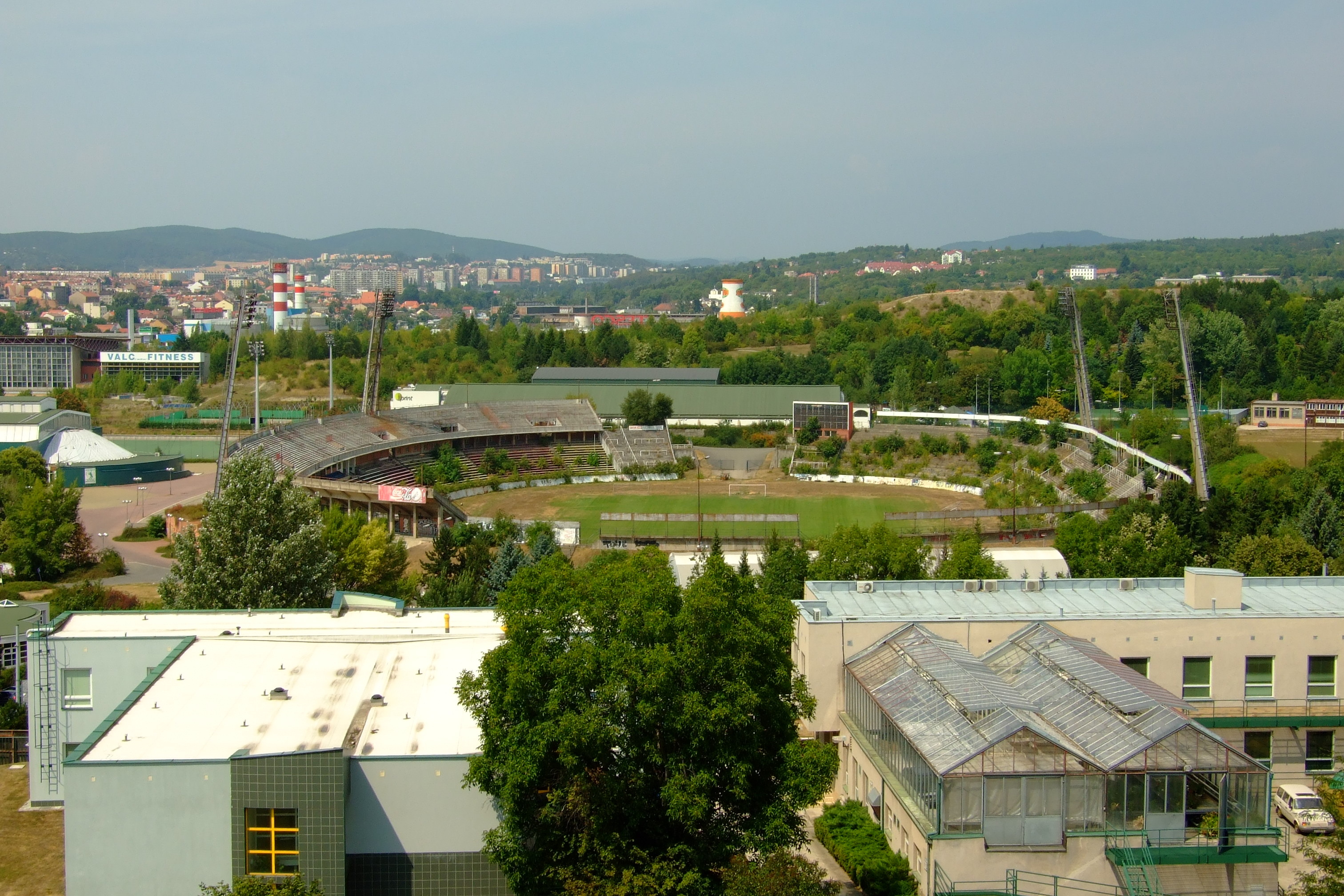
- Interactive map of Za Lužánkami Stadium
- Location: Brno, Czech Republic
- Coordinates: 49°12′46″N 16°36′42″E
- Owner: The city of Brno
- Capacity: 50,000
- Surface: Grass
- Field size: 105m x 68m

Construction
- Opened: 1953
- Closed: 2001

Tenants
- FC Zbrojovka Brno (until 2001)

The Za Lužánkami Stadium (Czech: Stadion Za Lužánkami) is a closed stadium in Brno, Czech Republic. It was primarily used for football, and was the home ground of FC Zbrojovka Brno. It held up to 50,000 people.

The stadium was constructed between 1949 and 1953 and was the biggest stadium in Czechoslovakia during the 1960s and 1970s. Za Lužánkami holds the record for the highest attendance in the Czech First League, set in a match between Brno and Slavia Prague during the 1996–97 Czech First League season. It was closed in 2001 after Zbrojovka Brno moved to Městský fotbalový stadion Srbská. The club was forced to move, since the stadium did not meet the football association and FIFA criteria.

Plans for a reconstruction of the stadium, whereby the team of FC Zbrojovka Brno would return, were made, but in June 2012 it was announced that, due to financial concerns, the proposed reconstruction was on hold.

The stadium fell into disrepair, with trees and bushes growing within it and homeless people living in the stands. FC Zbrojovka Brno captain, Petr Švancara, took it upon himself to try to restore the stadium in order that he could play a farewell game at Za Lužánkami. This effort expanded into a volunteer campaign, back by crowdfunding, to have the stadium ready to host a final game for Švancara. The project was a success, and on 27 June 2015 approximately 35,000 spectators watched two teams composed largely of former FC Zbrojovka Brno players play a match at Za Lužánkami.

FC Zbrojovka Brno's youth team currently train near the stadium, which is rented out to supporters group Verime Zbrojovce, and plans have been unveiled for a £40 million overhaul. However, it has since returned to its abandoned and overgrown state.

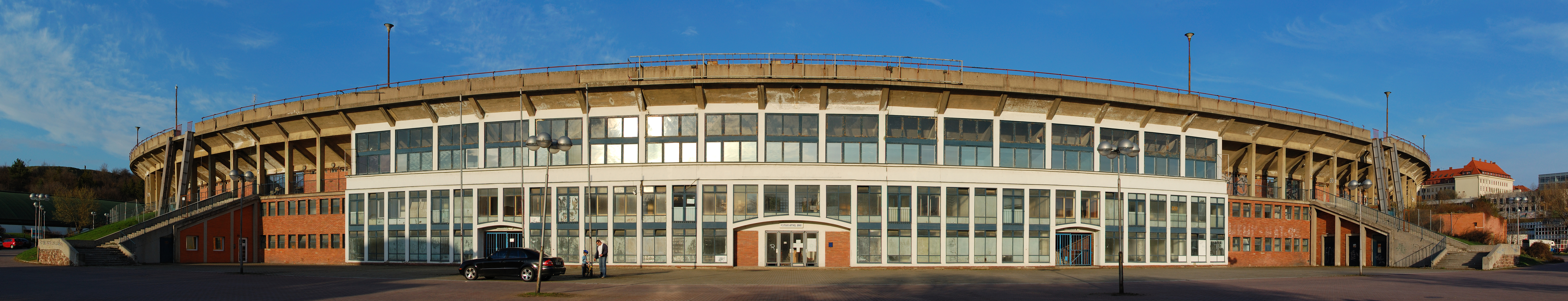
Panorama of Stadion Za Lužánkami in Brno, Czech Republic. Taken in April 2010.

== International matches ==
Stadion Za Lužánkami has hosted one friendly match of the Czech Republic national football team

8 March 1995 International Friendly	Czech Republic	4–1	Finland	Brno, Czech Republic
Match 517/9	Berger 8' (pen.), 45'; Samec 56', 88'	Report	Hjelm 71'	Stadium: Za Lužánkami Stadium; Attendance: 7,745; Referee: Benedik (Slovakia)
