= 1997–98 1.Lig =

40th season of top-tier Turkish football

1.Lig
- Season: 1997–98
- Champions: Galatasaray; 12th title
- Relegated: Kayserispor; Şekerspor; Vanspor
- Champions League: Galatasaray
- Cup Winners' Cup: Beşiktaş
- UEFA Cup: Fenerbahçe; Trabzonspor; İstanbulspor
- Intertoto Cup: Samsunspor; Altay
- Matches: 306
- Goals: 861 (2.81 per match)
- Top goalscorer: Hakan Şükür (32 goals)

Statistics of Turkish First Football League in the 1997–98 season.

== Overview ==
It was contested by 18 teams, and Galatasaray S.K. won the championship. And demotion of Kayserispor, Şekerspor, Vanspor was decided.

== League table ==
Pos	Team	Pld	W	D	L	GF	GA	GD	Pts	Qualification or relegation
1	Galatasaray (C)	34	23	6	5	86	43	+43	75	Qualification to Champions League second qualifying round
2	Fenerbahçe	34	21	8	5	61	25	+36	71	Qualification to UEFA Cup second qualifying round
3	Trabzonspor	34	19	9	6	68	42	+26	66	Qualification to UEFA Cup second qualifying round
4	İstanbulspor	34	14	12	8	60	42	+18	54	Qualification to UEFA Cup second qualifying round
5	Samsunspor	34	14	7	13	42	42	0	49	Qualification to Intertoto Cup second round
6	Beşiktaş	34	13	9	12	56	40	+16	48	Qualification to Cup Winners' Cup first round
7	Altay	34	12	11	11	45	52	−7	47	Qualification to Intertoto Cup first round
8	Bursaspor	34	12	9	13	46	50	−4	45	
9	Kardemir Karabükspor	34	13	5	16	34	50	−16	44	
10	Kocaelispor	34	12	7	15	46	46	0	43	
11	Çanakkale Dardanelspor	34	10	11	13	37	40	−3	41	
12	Antalyaspor	34	10	11	13	51	55	−4	41	
13	MKE Ankaragücü	34	11	8	15	40	47	−7	41	
14	Gençlerbirliği	34	9	11	14	41	46	−5	38	
15	Gaziantepspor	34	9	11	14	39	44	−5	38	
16	Kayserispor (R)	34	11	5	18	42	60	−18	38	Relegation to Turkish Second Football League
17	Şekerspor (R)	34	9	9	16	41	67	−26	36	Relegation to Turkish Second Football League
18	Vanspor (R)	34	5	9	20	26	70	−44	24	Relegation to Turkish Second Football League

Rules for classification: 1) points; 2) goal difference; 3) number of goals scored.
(C) Champions; (R) Relegated

== Results ==
Home \ Away	ALT	ANT	BJK	BUR	ÇDA	FNB	GAL	GAZ	GEN	İST	KRB	KAY	KOC	AGÜ	SAM	ŞKR	TRA	VAN
Altay		0–3	1–2	2–1	1–0	0–2	4–5	0–0	0–0	1–3	5–1	1–1	1–0	3–0	2–5	2–0	1–1	3–2
Antalyaspor	0–0		3–3	2–2	0–0	1–1	1–3	2–1	2–1	1–3	4–0	2–1	2–0	1–1	1–2	3–3	1–1	2–0
Beşiktaş	0–1	0–1		1–1	1–2	2–2	2–1	2–1	3–0	0–0	1–0	4–1	1–1	1–0	0–1	2–1	3–0	4–0
Bursaspor	1–0	4–1	2–1		0–0	1–1	3–2	1–2	2–1	1–1	4–0	1–0	1–2	1–0	2–3	0–6	1–2	6–0
Çanakkale Dardanelspor	2–2	3–1	0–0	0–0		0–1	1–2	1–0	1–2	1–1	1–1	3–0	2–0	1–1	0–0	4–1	2–1	2–0
Fenerbahçe	2–0	2–1	2–0	3–0	2–1		3–1	3–0	2–1	3–0	2–0	1–2	2–0	0–0	0–0	7–0	1–3	4–1
Galatasaray	6–1	2–1	3–2	4–0	1–0	2–2		1–0	3–1	4–1	3–0	5–1	2–0	2–1	2–1	4–1	2–2	6–2
Gaziantepspor	3–0	1–3	1–1	1–2	2–2	2–0	1–1		1–1	0–0	2–2	3–2	3–0	4–2	2–0	1–1	1–3	0–0
Gençlerbirliği	1–3	0–0	2–2	1–1	3–0	3–0	3–2	0–1		1–0	2–0	2–1	0–0	1–2	1–1	3–0	0–1	1–2
İstanbulspor	2–2	5–2	1–2	1–1	3–1	0–1	2–1	4–1	3–3		2–1	1–3	0–1	1–1	4–2	4–1	0–0	6–3
Kardemir Karabükspor	1–1	3–0	0–5	2–0	0–0	1–2	2–3	0–1	1–0	0–1		3–0	1–0	1–0	2–1	1–0	1–1	2–1
Kayserispor	1–1	3–1	1–0	2–1	3–0	0–3	1–2	1–0	2–0	0–0	0–1		2–1	1–1	0–1	0–1	5–6	1–1
Kocaelispor	0–1	2–1	3–2	1–2	3–1	2–1	1–1	1–1	1–1	3–0	2–3	3–1		2–0	4–0	3–0	1–3	4–2
MKE Ankaragücü	2–3	2–0	2–1	1–2	1–0	0–2	0–0	2–0	2–0	0–5	3–2	6–3	2–0		0–1	1–1	1–3	2–0
Samsunspor	2–3	2–2	0–0	2–0	3–0	0–2	0–2	1–0	3–1	0–0	0–1	2–0	1–1	0–2		3–0	2–1	2–0
Şekerspor	0–0	2–1	2–0	3–1	1–4	1–1	2–4	4–3	0–0	0–2	1–0	0–1	2–1	1–1	2–1		0–2	1–1
Trabzonspor	3–0	2–2	3–1	1–0	0–2	0–0	1–1	1–0	4–5	0–3	2–0	2–0	2–2	3–1	4–0	6–3		2–0
Vanspor	0–0	0–3	1–7	1–1	3–0	0–1	0–3	0–0	0–0	1–1	0–1	1–2	2–1	1–0	1–0	0–0	0–2	

Source: TFF, Mackolik
Legend: Blue = home team win; Yellow = draw; Red = away team win.

== Top scorers ==
Rank	Player	Club	Goals
1	(Turkey) Hakan Şükür	Galatasaray	32
2	(Turkey) Hami Mandıralı	Trabzonspor	20
3	(Turkey) Serkan Aykut	Samsunspor	18
4	(Turkey) Aykut Kocaman	İstanbulspor	16
4	(Turkey) Mehmet Özdilek	Beşiktaş	16
6	(Uganda) Majid Musisi	Çanakkale Dardanelspor	15
7	(Democratic Republic of the Congo) Andre Kona N'Gole	Antalyaspor	14
7	(Turkey) Erdoğan Yılmaz	Karabükspor	14
7	(Nigeria) Jay-Jay Okocha	Fenerbahçe	14
7	(Turkey) Uğur Dağdelen	Kayseri Erciyesspor	14

Milliyet report: Şekerspor goalkeeper Murat Akarsu alleged that he had been offered a bribe to fix a match in Fenerbahçe's favour. Following his report to club officials, a police operation resulted in the detention of Özcan Üstündaş and Ufuk Gezeroğlu.

== Controversies ==
In 2020, former Kocaelispor goalkeeper Dumitru Stângaciu stated in an interview that Kocaelispor players had received incentive bonuses (teşvik primler) after their 2–1 victory over Fenerbahçe during the 1997–98 title race. Stângaciu claimed that he personally received US$20,000 and alleged that the money came through Romanian players associated with Galatasaray. In the interview, he described the events as taking place "shortly before the 1998 FIFA World Cup", although the match was played on 27 March 1998 and the tournament began on 10 June 1998.

Following the Şekerspor–Fenerbahçe match played on 3 May 1998, which ended in a draw, Şekerspor goalkeeper Murat Akarsu alleged that he had been offered US$100,000 intermediaries to fix the match in Fenerbahçe's favour. An investigation was subsequently launched. Football manager Özcan Üstündaş and Ufuk Gezeroğlu were detained by police in Ankara in connection with the allegations. According to later reports, the suspects were released pending trial.

Years later, Üstündaş was also mentioned in media coverage of the 2011 Turkish football match-fixing scandal involving Fenerbahçe president Aziz Yıldırım and other club officials.

== Weblinks ==
- Turkey - List of final tables (RSSSF)
