= Kakhaber Kvetenadze =

Georgian footballer

Personal information
- Date of birth: 3 June 1970 (age 56)
- Height: 1.76 m (5 ft 9 1/2 in)
- Position: Midfielder

Senior career*
Years	Team	Apps	(Gls)
1988–1989	Lokomotiv Samtredia	41	(0)
1990–1992	Pizkulturis Instituti Tbilisi	80	(7)
1992–1993	FC Samgurali Tskaltubo	16	(1)
1993–2001	FC Torpedo Kutaisi	206	(26)
2001–2002	FC Kolkheti-1913 Poti	25	(0)
2002–2003	FC Torpedo Kutaisi	45	(4)
2004	FC Ordabasy	26	(0)
2004–2005	FC Sahdag Qusar	12	(1)
2005–2007	FC Torpedo Kutaisi	10	(0)

International career
1998	Georgia	2	(0)
- * Club domestic league appearances and goals

Kakhaber Kvetenadze (born 3 June 1970) is a retired Georgian professional football player.
