= Toni Naumoski =

Macedonian footballer

Personal information
- Date of birth: 2 August 1968 (age 58)
- Place of birth: Prilep, SFR Yugoslavia
- Position: Midfielder

Senior career*
Years	Team	Apps	(Gls)
–1992	FK Pelister		
1992–1993?	FK Pobeda		
–1996	FK Makedonija Gjorče Petrov		
1996–1998	FK Pobeda		
1998–1999	FK Makedonija Gjorče Petrov		
1999–2003	FK Pobeda		

International career
1996–1997	Macedonia	6	(0)

Managerial career
- 2011–2012: FK 11 Oktomvri
- * Club domestic league appearances and goals

Toni Naumoski (born 2 August 1968) is a retired Macedonian football midfielder.
