= Andreas Havlykke =

Danish footballer (born 1975)

Personal information
- Date of birth: 27 September 1975 (age 51)
- Height: 1.80 m (5 ft 11 in)
- Position: Forward

Senior career*
Years	Team	Apps	(Gls)
1997–2001	Lyngby		
2002–2003	Nordsjælland		
2003–2004	Nykøbing Falster		
2004–2005	Lyngby		
- * Club domestic league appearances and goals

Andreas Havlykke (born 27 September 1975) is a Danish retired football striker.
