= Zdravko Drinčić =

Footballer (born 1972)

Personal information
- Date of birth: 1 May 1972 (age 54)
- Place of birth: Nikšić, SFR Yugoslavia
- Height: 1.85 m (6 ft 1 in)
- Position: Forward

Senior career*
Years	Team	Apps	(Gls)
1989–1990	Sutjeska	8	(0)
1990–1995	Rad	91	(24)
1991	→ Sutjeska (loan)	10	(1)
1995	Neuchâtel Xamax	1	(0)
1995	Osasuna	6	(0)
1996–1998	Vojvodina	46	(11)
1998–2001	VfL Bochum	37	(4)
2001	Waldhof Mannheim	4	(0)
2002–2004	Vojvodina	33	(8)
2004	Panachaiki	7	(0)
Total		243	(48)
- * Club domestic league appearances and goals

Zdravko Drinčić (Cyrillic: Здравко Дринчић; born 1 May 1972) is a Montenegrin former professional footballer who played as a forward. He represented VfL Bochum for three seasons, including two in the Bundesliga.

== Career ==
Drinčić made his debut with hometown club Sutjeska Nikšić in the 1989–90 Yugoslav Second League. He then moved to Rad and scored once in the first half of the 1990–91 Yugoslav First League. In early 1991, Drinčić rejoined Sutjeska Nikšić and scored once in the second half of the 1990–91 Yugoslav Second League. He later returned to Rad and played regularly in the First League of FR Yugoslavia, scoring 23 more goals (1992–1995).

In July 1995, Drinčić moved abroad and joined Swiss club Neuchâtel Xamax, appearing in one league game. He subsequently switched to Spanish side Osasuna and played there until the end of the year. In early 1996, Drinčić returned to FR Yugoslavia and joined Vojvodina. He spent two and a half years at the club, helping them reach the 1998 UEFA Intertoto Cup finals.
