= Maksim Putilin =

Russian footballer

Personal information
- Full name: Maksim Yuryevich Putilin
- Date of birth: June 11, 1966 (age 60)
- Place of birth: Vladimir, Russian SFSR
- Height: 1.95 m (6 ft 5 in)
- Positions: Defender; midfielder

Senior career*
Years	Team	Apps	(Gls)
1984	FC Torpedo Vladimir	28	(4)
1987–1989	FC Torpedo Vladimir	109	(6)
1990	FC Fakel Voronezh	0	(0)
1990–1991	FC Torpedo Vladimir	77	(12)
1992	FC Asmaral Moscow	23	(4)
1993	FC Torpedo Moscow	19	(0)
1994–1995	FC Lokomotiv Nizhny Novgorod	46	(3)
1996–1998	FC Shinnik Yaroslavl	100	(4)
1999	FC Kristall Smolensk	37	(3)
2000–2001	FC Amkar Perm	67	(7)
2002	FC Chkalovets-1936 Novosibirsk	24	(1)
- * Club domestic league appearances and goals

Maksim Yuryevich Putilin (Russian: Максим Юрьевич Путилин; born 11 June 1966) is a Russian former professional footballer.

== Career ==
He made his professional debut in the Soviet Second League in 1984 for FC Torpedo Vladimir. He played 3 games and scored 1 goal in the UEFA Intertoto Cup 1998 for FC Shinnik Yaroslavl.

His son Roman Putilin is a professional footballer.

== Honours ==
- Russian Cup winner: 1993.
