= Roman Putilin =

Russian footballer (born 1990)

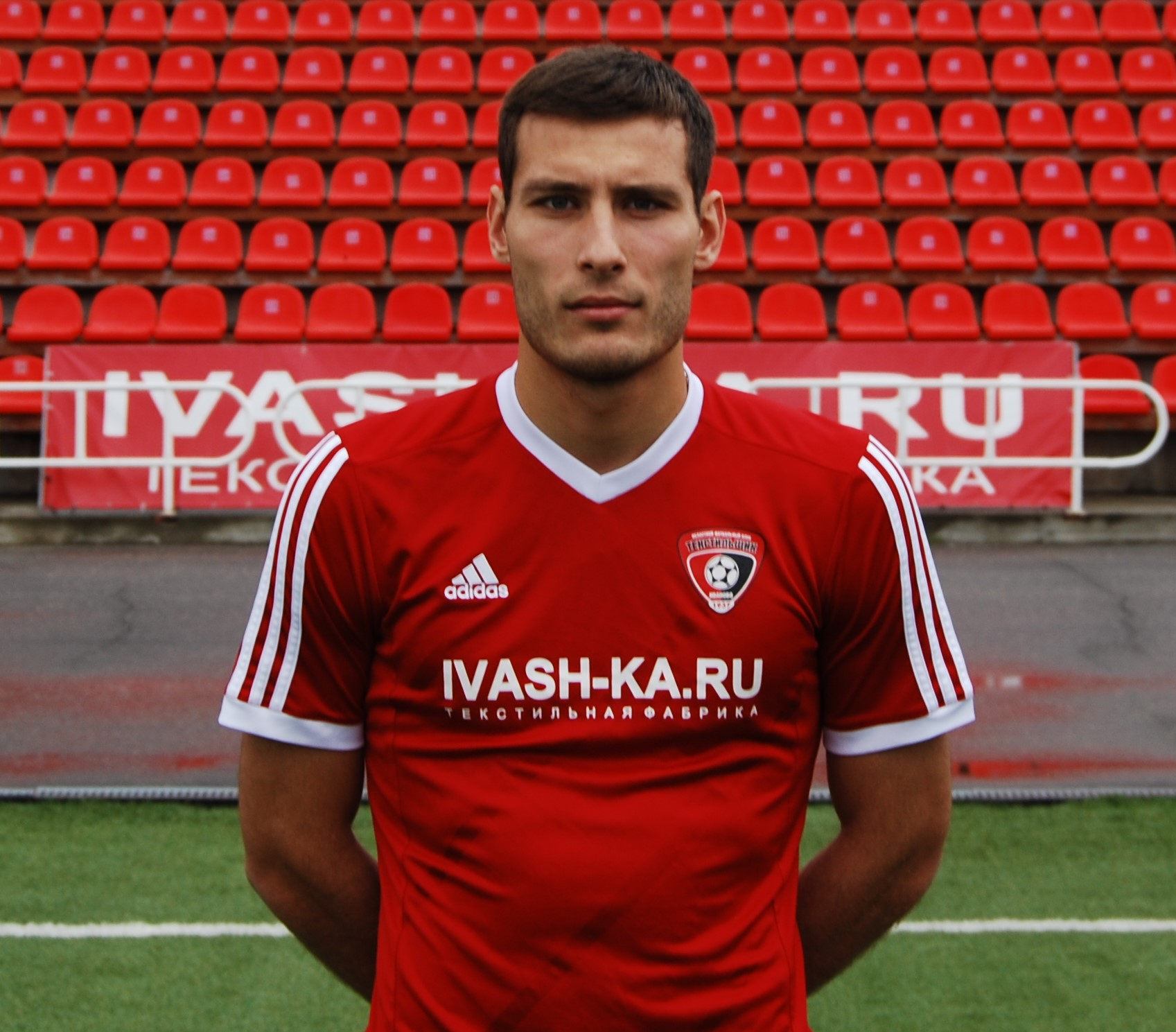

Personal information
- Full name: Roman Maksimovich Putilin
- Date of birth: 4 December 1990 (age 35)
- Place of birth: Vladimir, Russian SFSR
- Height: 1.89 m (6 ft 2 in)
- Position: Defender

Senior career*
Years	Team	Apps	(Gls)
2008–2015	FC Torpedo Vladimir	64	(4)
2015–2019	FC Tekstilshchik Ivanovo	68	(3)
2020	FC Luki-Energiya Velikiye Luki	9	(0)
2021	FC Murom	2	(1)
- * Club domestic league appearances and goals

Roman Maksimovich Putilin (Russian: Роман Максимович Путилин; born 4 December 1990) is a Russian former professional football player.

== Club career ==
He made his Russian Football National League debut for FC Torpedo Vladimir on 7 April 2012 in a game against FC KAMAZ Naberezhnye Chelny.

== Personal ==
Putilin was born on December 4, 1990, in Vladimir, Russia. He is a son of Maksim Putilin.
