= Krzysztof Bizacki =

Polish footballer

Personal information
- Date of birth: 7 April 1973 (age 53)
- Place of birth: Tychy, Poland
- Height: 1.69 m (5 ft 6 1/2 in)
- Position: Striker

Senior career*
Years	Team	Apps	(Gls)
1990–1993	GKS Tychy		
1993–1995	Ruch Chorzów	37	(8)
1995–1996	Sokół Tychy	51	(8)
1997–2003	Ruch Chorzów	190	(49)
2003–2004	Odra Wodzisław Śląski	11	(0)
2004–2006	Ruch Chorzów	55	(15)
2006–2008	Koszarawa Żywiec		
2008–2013	GKS Tychy	104	(21)

International career
2000	Poland	2	(0)
- * Club domestic league appearances and goals

Krzysztof Bizacki (born 7 April 1973) is a Polish former professional footballer who played as a striker.

== Career ==
Bizacki began his career in the 1990–91 season, when he played for GKS Tychy.

He moved to Ruch Chorzów during the following season. His most notable moments include his participation for the team in the Intertoto Cup in 1998. He has played more than 300 games for Ruch, scoring more than eighty goals.
