= Flavius Pogăcean =

Romanian footballer

Personal information
- Full name: Florin Flavius Pogăcean
- Date of birth: 6 October 1974 (age 52)
- Position: Midfielder

Senior career*
Years	Team	Apps	(Gls)
1992–1998	Inter Sibiu		
1998–1999	National București		
1998-1999	CSM Reșița (loan)		
1999–2000	Gloria Bistrița		
1999-2000	Astra Giurgiu (loan)		
2000–2001	Gaz Metan Mediaș		
2001-2002	Gaz Metan Mediaş		
- * Club domestic league appearances and goals

Flavius Pogăcean (born 6 October 1974) is a retired Romanian football midfielder.
