= Mariusz Śrutwa =

Polish footballer

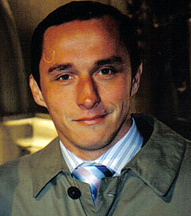
- Śrutwa in 2007

Personal information
- Date of birth: 15 July 1971 (age 55)
- Place of birth: Bytom, Poland
- Height: 1.83 m (6 ft 0 in)
- Position: Striker

Senior career*
Years	Team	Apps	(Gls)
1989–1991	Polonia Bytom		
1991–1999	Ruch Chorzów	199	(86)
1999	Legia Warsaw	24	(7)
2000–2006	Ruch Chorzów	176	(66)
2007	Rozwój Katowice		

International career
1996–1998	Poland	5	(0)
- * Club domestic league appearances and goals

Mariusz Śrutwa (born 15 July 1971) is a Polish former professional footballer who played as a striker.

== Honours ==
Ruch Chorzów

- Polish Cup: 1995–96

Individual

- Ekstraklasa top scorer: 1997–98
- II liga top scorer: 1995–96
