= Maciej Mizia =

Polish footballer

Personal information
- Date of birth: 20 November 1965 (age 60)
- Place of birth: Bielsko-Biała, Poland
- Height: 1.81 m (5 ft 11 in)
- Position: Midfielder

Youth career
- LZS Komorowice

Senior career*
Years	Team	Apps	(Gls)
1981–1982	BBTS Bielsko-Biała		
1982–1988	BKS Stal Bielsko-Biała		
1988–1990	Zagłębie Sosnowiec		
1990–1993	Ruch Chorzów	25	(8)
1993	Korona Kielce		
1993	Szombierki Bytom		
1993	Kremser SC		
1994–1996	Zawisza Bydgoszcz		
1996	Intrat Wałcz		
1996–2001	Ruch Chorzów	127	(10)
2001	Jersey Falcons		
2002	Czarni-Góral Żywiec		
2002	Zagłębie Sosnowiec		
2002	A.A.C. Eagles		
2003–2004	Ruch Chorzów	9	(0)
2005	Zagłębiak Dąbrowa Górnicza		
2006	Czarni-Góral Żywiec		
2006	Unia Ząbkowice		
2007	Strumyk Zarzecze		
2010	Górnik Sosnowiec		

Managerial career
- 2011: GKS Tychy (caretaker)
- * Club domestic league appearances and goals

Maciej Mizia (born 20 November 1965) is a Polish former professional footballer who played as a midfielder.

== Honours ==
Zagłębie Sosnowiec

- II liga, group II: 1988–89
