= Sergei Putilin =

Russian footballer

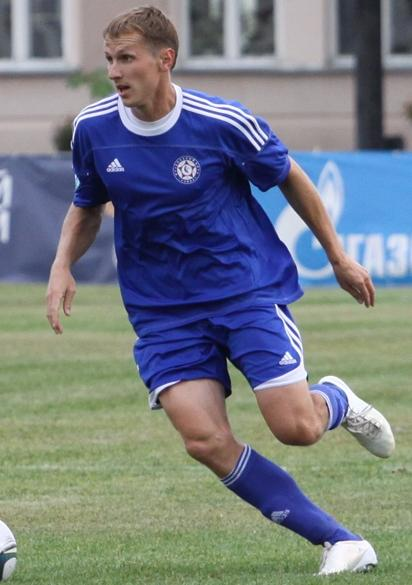

Personal information
- Full name: Sergei Nikolayevich Putilin
- Date of birth: 13 November 1986 (age 39)
- Place of birth: Tikhoretsk, Krasnodar Krai, Russian SFSR
- Height: 1.88 m (6 ft 2 in)
- Positions: Midfielder; defender

Senior career*
Years	Team	Apps	(Gls)
2006	FC Sochi-04	13	(0)
2006–2007	FC Kuban Krasnodar	0	(0)
2007–2008	FC Sochi-04	39	(1)
2009–2010	FC Torpedo Armavir	49	(2)
2011–2012	FC KAMAZ Naberezhnye Chelny	17	(1)
2012	FC Ufa	10	(2)
2013	FC Luch-Energiya Vladivostok	9	(1)
2013–2014	FC Angusht Nazran	30	(1)
2014	FC Avangard Kursk	18	(1)
2015	FC Torpedo Armavir	14	(1)
2016	FC SKA Rostov-on-Don	4	(0)
2016–2017	FC Chernomorets Novorossiysk	8	(0)
2017–2018	FC Torpedo Moscow	13	(1)
2018	FC Veles Moscow	3	(0)
- * Club domestic league appearances and goals

Sergei Nikolayevich Putilin (Russian: Серге́й Николаевич Путилин; born 13 November 1986) is a Russian former professional football player.

== Club career ==
He made his Russian Football National League debut for FC KAMAZ Naberezhnye Chelny on 18 April 2011 in a game against FC Torpedo Vladimir. He played 4 seasons in the FNL for Torpedo Vladimir, FC Ufa, FC Angusht Nazran and FC Torpedo Armavir.
