= İlhan Akgül =

Turkish footballer

Personal information
- Date of birth: 2 November 1970 (age 55)
- Place of birth: Istanbul, Turkey
- Position: Midfielder

Senior career*
Years	Team	Apps	(Gls)
1990–1993	Gaziosmanpaşaspor		
1993–1994	Aydinspor		
1996–1997	Karşıyaka		
1996–2003	Altay		
2003	Şekerspor		
2003–2004	Zonguldakspor		
2004–2005	Adanaspor		
2005–2006	Yıldırım Bosnaspor		
2006–2007	Alibeyköy		
- * Club domestic league appearances and goals

İlhan Akgül (born 2 November 1970) is a retired Turkish football midfielder.
