= Petteri Kaijasilta =

Finnish footballer (born 1974)

Personal information
- Date of birth: 3 August 1974 (age 52)
- Place of birth: Turku, Finland
- Height: 1.82 m (6 ft 0 in)
- Position: Forward

Senior career*
Years	Team	Apps	(Gls)
1995–1999	TPS	72	(17)
1996	→ Falkirk (loan)	1	(0)
1999	VPS	10	(5)
2000–2001	Jokerit	33	(4)
2001	Atlantis	9	(3)
2002–2003	AC Allianssi	38	(15)
2004–2005	PK-35	37	(37)
2005	MyPa	7	(1)
2006–2010	PK-35 Vantaa	119	(71)

International career
1998–1999	Finland	4	(1)
- * Club domestic league appearances and goals

Petteri Kaijasilta (born 3 August 1974) is a retired Finnish football striker.

== Personal life ==
His son Noah Kaijasilta is a footballer for Ykkösliiga club SalPa.

== Career statistics ==
=== Club ===
Appearances and goals by club, season and competition
Club	Season	League			Europe		Total	
Club	Season	Division	Apps	Goals	Apps	Goals	Apps	Goals
TPS	1995	Veikkausliiga	2	0	–		2	0
TPS	1996	Veikkausliiga	5	2	–		5	2
TPS	1997	Veikkausliiga	26	9	4 (Note: Appearances in UEFA Intertoto Cup)	0	30	9
TPS	1998	Veikkausliiga	23	3	4	3	27	6
TPS	1999	Veikkausliiga	16	3	–		16	3
TPS	Total		72	17	8	3	80	20
Turun Weikot (loan)	1995	Kakkonen	11	3	–		11	3
Pargas IF (loan)	1995	Kakkonen	1	0	–		1	0
Falkirk (loan)	1996–97	Scottish First Division	1	0	–		1	0
VPS	1999	Veikkausliiga	10	5	2 (Note: Appearances in UEFA Cup)	0	12	5
Jokerit	2000	Veikkausliiga	18	2	0	0	18	2
Jokerit	2001	Veikkausliiga	15	2	0	0	15	2
Jokerit	Total		33	4	0	0	33	4
Hangö IK (loan)	2001	Ykkönen	2	2	–		2	2
Atlantis	2001	Veikkausliiga	9	3	–		9	3
AC Allianssi	2002	Veikkausliiga	24	13	–		24	13
AC Allianssi	2003	Veikkausliiga	14	2	5	0	19	2
AC Allianssi	Total		38	15	5	0	43	15
PK-35	2004	Kakkonen	23	26	–		23	26
PK-35	2005	Ykkönen	14	11	–		14	11
PK-35	Total		37	37	0	0	37	37
MYPA	2005	Veikkausliiga	7	1	3	0	10	1
PK-35	2006	Ykkönen		19	–			19
PK-35	2007	Ykkönen	3	5	–		3	5
PK-35	2008	Ykkönen	26	17	–		26	17
PK-35	Total		29	41	0	0	29	41
PK-35 Vantaa	2009	Ykkönen	20	9	–		20	9
PK-35 Vantaa	2010	Ykkönen	23	8	–		23	8
PK-35 Vantaa	2011	Ykkönen			–			0
PK-35 Vantaa	Total		43	17	0	0	43	17
Career total			293	145	18	3	311	148

=== International ===
As of 10 February 1999

Appearances and goals by national team and year
National team	Year	Apps	Goals
Finland	1998	1	0
Finland	1999	3	1
Total		4	1

Scores and results list Finland's goal tally first, score column indicates score after each Hartikainen goal.

List of international goals scored by Anni Hartikainen
No.	Date	Venue	Opponent	Score	Result	Competition
1.	3 February 1999	GSZ Stadium, Larnaca, Cyprus	Greece	1–0	1–2	Friendly

== Honours ==
MYPA

- Veikkausliiga: 2005

Individual

- Ykkönen Top scorer: 2006
- Kakkonen Top scorer: 2004
