= Justin Perry =

American vigilante

- Born: 1985 or 1986 (age 39–40)
- Other name: Mr. 17540
- Years active: 2018–present
- Known for: Vigilante activities

Justin Perry, also known as Mr. 17540, is an American vigilante based in Pennsylvania.

== History ==
Perry began carrying out his vigilante activities in 2018. His operations consist of posing as a female teenager on the internet and setting up real life meetings with those who solicit him. The meetings are broadcast on social media. On multiple occasions, such operations have culminated into fights, and Perry's followers have been reported to hound his targets on social media after being made aware of their identities.

He was briefly featured in the first episode of the HBO series How To with John Wilson, titled "How To Make Small Talk."

He has used the online moniker Mr. 17540, a reference to the ZIP code of his hometown Leola. Perry has conducted about 36 sting operations up to December 2019.

== Legal cases ==
Perry was convicted of harassment in September 2024. His female victim told police that Perry grabbed her and caused her to fall into a table, resulting in a laceration in the back of her head. The woman also said that he head-butted and blocked her from leaving the room multiple times. According to police reports, Perry fled the scene after another household member confronted him. As part of his plea bargain, his other charges of simple assault and false imprisonment were dropped. Perry has been convicted for theft and forgery.

Perry was charged with a crime related to child pornography in 2018. The incident came after his phone was examined by police following one of his sting operations in Lancaster. The charge was eventually dropped and his seized phone and computer were returned. The prosecutors declined to comment on the matter and described the case as an open investigation.

== Personal life ==
Perry is a single father. He has worked part-time as a line cook.
