= Magnus Källander =

Swedish footballer and coach

Personal information
- Full name: Magnus Källander
- Date of birth: 6 February 1969 (age 57)
- Place of birth: Sweden
- Height: 1.76 m (5 ft 9 in)
- Position: Midfielder

Youth career
- –1988: Västra Frölunda IF

Senior career*
Years	Team	Apps	(Gls)
1989–1995	Västra Frölunda IF		
1996–2002	Örgryte IS		
2003	Aris	28	(1)
2004	Iraklis	10	(1)
2004–2009	Örgryte IS	138	(10)
2010–2014	Stenungsunds IF	96	(4)

Managerial career
- 2011–2014: Stenungsunds IF (assistant manager)
- * Club domestic league appearances and goals as of 11 October 2014

Magnus Källander (born 6 February 1969) is a Swedish football coach and former footballer. His last club was Stenungsunds IF.

== Honours ==
=== Club ===
Västra Frölunda IF

- Division 1 Västra: 1991

Örgryte IS

- Svenska Cupen: 1999–2000
- Superettan: 2008

Stenungsunds IF

- Division 4 Bohuslän/Dalsland: 2011

=== Individual ===
- Swedish Goal of the Year: 2000
