= Murat Alaçayır =

Turkish footballer

Personal information
- Date of birth: 1 August 1973 (age 53)
- Place of birth: Ankara, Turkey
- Height: 1.75 m (5 ft 9 in)
- Position: Midfielder

Youth career
- Bursaspor
- Kocaelispor

Senior career*
Years	Team	Apps	(Gls)
1993–1994	Mustafakemalpaşa Spor		
1994–1996	Bandırmaspor		
1996–1997	Kartalspor		
1997–1999	Altay		
1999–2001	Beşiktaş		
2001–2003	Diyarbakırspor		
2002–2003	→ Sakaryaspor (loan)		
2003–2005	Altay		
2005–2007	İzmirspor		

Managerial career
- 2010: Bucaspor (youth)
- 2011–2013: Altay (youth)
- 2014–2015: Bergama Belediyespor
- 2015: Serhat Ardahan Spor
- 2015–2016: Sandiklispor (assistant)
- 2016–2017: Sandiklispor
- * Club domestic league appearances and goals

Murat Alaçayır (born 1 August 1973) is a retired Turkish football midfielder and later manager.
