= Thomas Schønnemann =

Danish footballer (born 1970)

Personal information
- Date of birth: 16 April 1970 (age 56)
- Place of birth: Hvidovre
- Position: Defender

Senior career*
Years	Team	Apps	(Gls)
1990–1993	Hvidovre IF		
1994–1995	AB		
1995–1996	FC København		
1996–1999	AB		
- * Club domestic league appearances and goals

Thomas Schønnemann (born 16 April 1970) is a Danish retired football defender.
