= Eirik Dybendal =

Norwegian footballer (born 1978)

Personal information
- Full name: Ralf Eirik Dybendal
- Date of birth: 28 April 1978 (age 48)
- Place of birth: Norway
- Position: Midfielder

Senior career*
Years	Team	Apps	(Gls)
1996–2000	Kongsvinger	77	(16)
2000–2002	Bodø/Glimt	35	(1)
2003–2005	Häcken	64	(17)
2006–2010	Norrköping	78	(5)
2010–2012	Oddevold	22	(2)
- * Club domestic league appearances and goals

Ralf Eirik Dybendal (born 28 April 1978) is a Norwegian former footballer who played as a midfielder.

== Early life ==
Dybendal started his career with Norwegian side Kongsvinger. He is a native of Flisa, Norway.

== Career ==
In 2003, Dybendal signed for Swedish side Häcken. He helped the club achieve promotion. In 2006, he signed for Swedish side Norrköping. He was regarded as one of the club's most important players.

== Style of play ==
Dybendal mainly operated as a midfielder. He is left-footed.

== Personal life ==
Dybendal was born in 1978 in Norway. He has served in the Norwegian military.
