= Øivind Berg =

Norwegian ice hockey player

Personal information
- Born: 23 March 1946 (age 80) Oslo, Norway

Sport
- Sport: Ice hockey

Øivind Berg (born 23 March 1946) is a Norwegian ice hockey player. He was born in Oslo and represented the club IF Frisk Asker. He played for the Norwegian national ice hockey team, and participated at the Winter Olympics in Sapporo in 1972, where the Norwegian team placed 8th.
