= Pavel Mráz (footballer) =

Czech footballer (born 1968)

Personal information
- Date of birth: 31 August 1968 (age 58)
- Place of birth: Prague, Czechoslovakia
- Height: 1.76 m (5 ft 9 in)
- Position: Forward

Senior career*
| Years | Team | Apps | (Gls) |
| 1991–1993 | LASK | | |
| 1993–1997 | SV Ried | | |
| 1997–1998 | Sliema Wanderers | | |
| 1998–1999 | Hibernians | | |
| 1999–2001 | Valletta | | |
| 2001–2002 | Nadur Youngsters | | |
| 2002 | Sliema Wanderers | | |
- * Club domestic league appearances and goals

Pavel Mráz (born 31 August 1968) is a Czech former professional footballer who played as a forward.

== Career ==
Born in Prague, Mráz spent his early career with LASK, SV Ried, Sliema Wanderers and Hibernians.

After falling out of favour at Valletta, Mráz spent time with Nadur Youngsters and Sliema Wanderers.
