= Janusz Nawrocki =

Polish footballer (born 1961)

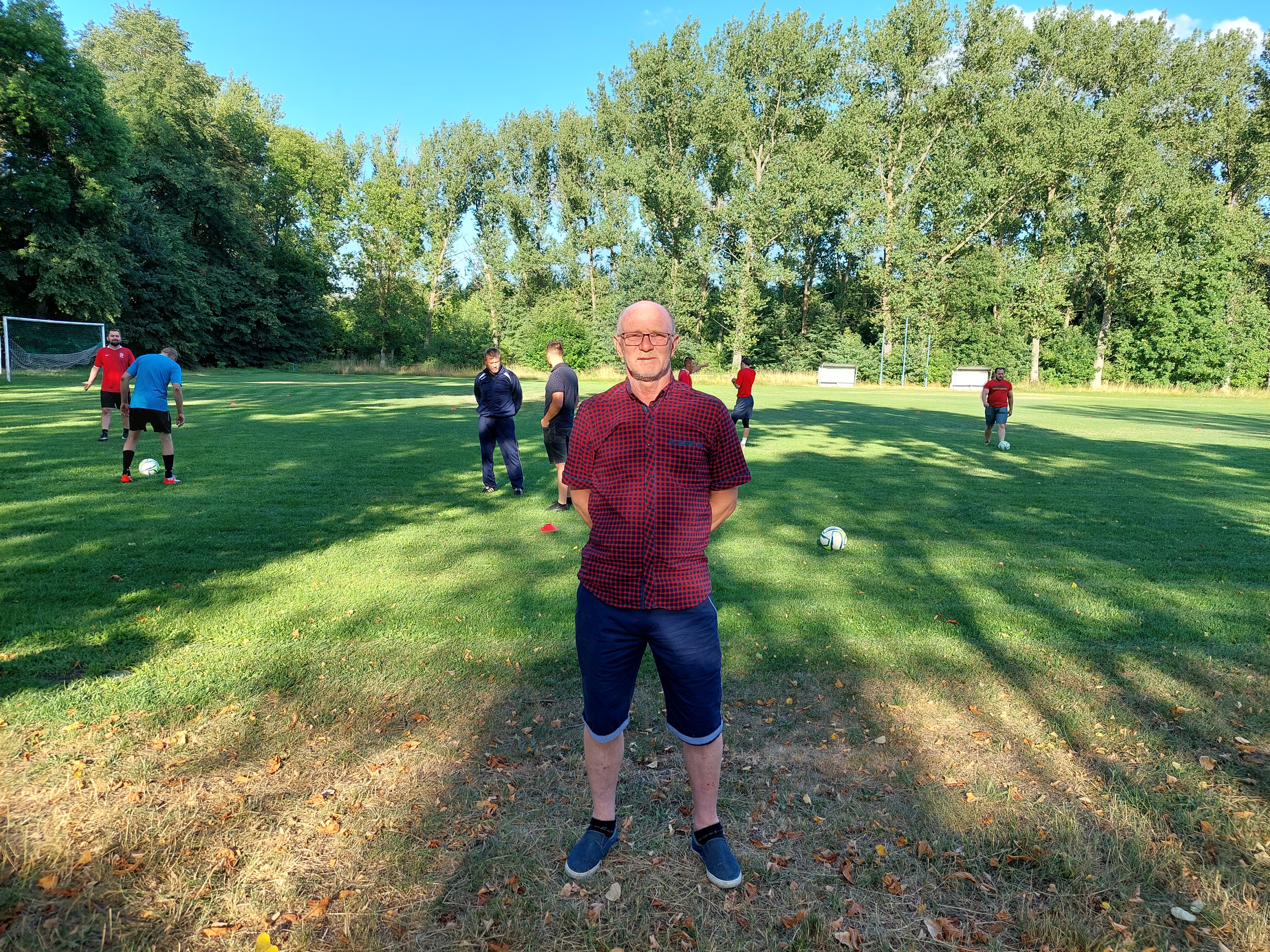

Personal information
- Date of birth: 8 July 1961 (age 65)
- Place of birth: Kraków, Poland
- Height: 1.73 m (5 ft 8 in)
- Position: Defender

Senior career*
Years	Team	Apps	(Gls)
1979–1986	Wisła Kraków		
1986–1991	GKS Katowice	134	(10)
1991–1995	VfB Mödling	94	(1)
1995–1997	Sokół Tychy	56	(0)
1997–1998	Ruch Chorzów	52	(0)
1999–2000	Grunwald Ruda Śląska		
2000–2001	Unia Jaroszowiec		
2001–2003	Tempo Rzeszotary		
2003–2004	Niegoszowianka Niegoszowice		
2004–2005	Wróblowianka Wróblowice		
2005–2007	Lotnik Kryspinów		
2007	Tempo Rzeszotary		
2008	LKS Szaflary		

International career
1989–1991	Poland	23	(0)
- * Club domestic league appearances and goals

Janusz Nawrocki (born 8 July 1961) is a Polish former professional footballer who played as a defender. Besides Poland, he has played in Austria.

== Honours ==
GKS Katowice

- Polish Cup: 1990–91
- Polish Super Cup: 1991
