= Önder Deniz Kolgu =

Turkish footballer (born 1974)

Deniz Kolgu
Personal information
- Full name: Önder Deniz Kolgu
- Date of birth: 28 January 1974 (age 52)
- Place of birth: Istanbul, Turkey
- Height: 1.80 m (5 ft 11 in)
- Position: Midfielder

Senior career*
Years	Team	Apps	(Gls)
1991–1994	Çengelköyspor		
1994–1995	Orduspor		
1995–2001	Bursaspor		
1995–2001	→ Ankaragücü (loan)		
1995–2001	→ Göztepe (loan)		
2001–2003	Diyarbakırspor		
2003–2004	Manisaspor		
2004–2005	Khazar Lankaran		
2005–2006	Ankaragücü		
2006	Sakaryaspor		
2006–2007	Kocaelispor		
2007	İstanbulspor		
2007–2008	Dardanelspor		
2008–2009	Alibeyköyspor		
2009	Bozüyükspor		

Managerial career
- 2012: Cekmeköyspor (assistant)
- 2012–2014: Balıkesirspor (assistant)
- 2015: Kocaeli Birlikspor (assistant)
- 2015: Sakaryaspor
- 2016: Dardanelspor
- 2016–2017: Kartalspor
- 2017–2018: Erbaaspor
- 2018–2019: Alibeyköyspor
- * Club domestic league appearances and goals

Önder Deniz Kolgu (born 28 January 1974) is a Turkish football manager and former player who played as a midfielder.
