= Christian Schreiber (footballer) =

Austrian footballer and coach

Personal information
- Date of birth: 25 November 1977 (age 48)
- Position: Midfielder

Senior career*
Years	Team	Apps	(Gls)
- VST Völkermarkt
1998–2001	Austria Wien	7	(0)
2001–2002	WSG Wattens		
2002–2003	SVG Bleiburg		
2003–2004	SV Spittal/Drau		
- VST Völkermarkt

Managerial career
- 2018–2019: SK Austria Klagenfurt
- * Club domestic league appearances and goals

Christian Schreiber (born 25 November 1977) is an Austrian football coach and former professional player.

== Career ==
Born in Spittal an der Drau, Schreiber played as a midfielder for VST Völkermarkt, Austria Wien, WSG Wattens, SVG Bleiburg and SV Spittal/Drau.

He managed SK Austria Klagenfurt between 2018 and 2019.
