= Petr Švancara =

Czech footballer

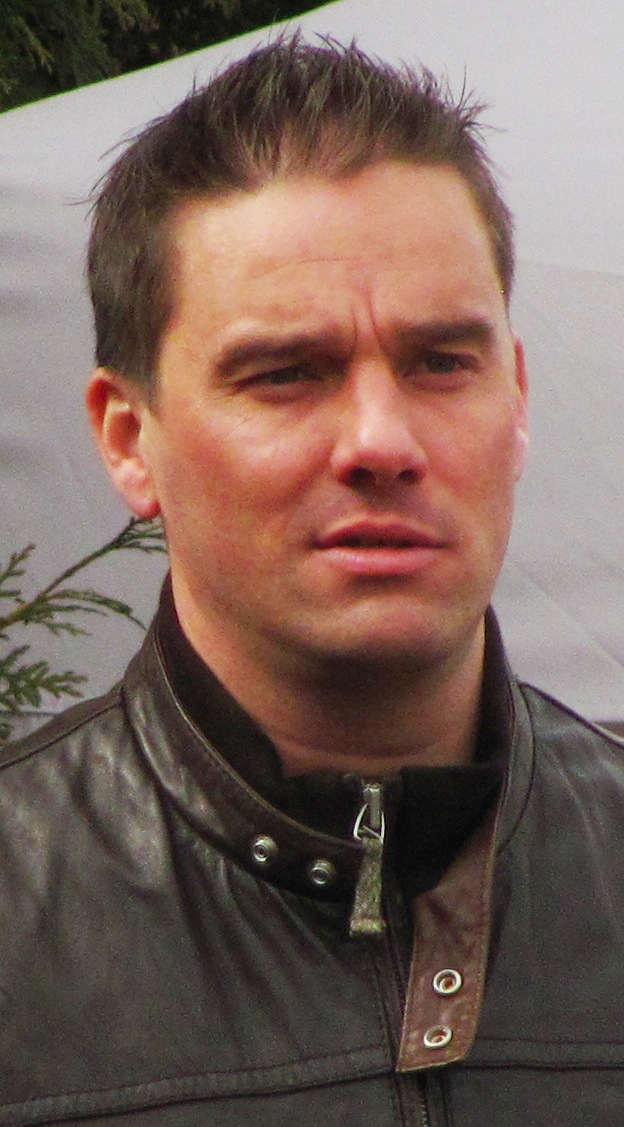

Personal information
- Date of birth: 5 November 1977 (age 48)
- Place of birth: Brno, Czechoslovakia
- Height: 1.84 m (6 ft 1/2 in)
- Position: Forward

Youth career
- 1983–1987: Zetor Brno
- 1987–1997: Boby Brno

Senior career*
Years	Team	Apps	(Gls)
1997	Slovácká Slavia Uherské Hradiště	14	(1)
1997–1998	Synot Staré Město	27	(10)
1998–2000	Boby Brno	55	(10)
2000–2002	Slavia Praha	44	(3)
2002–2003	→ SFC Opava (loan)	27	(20)
2003–2006	1. FC Brno	70	(14)
2006–2007	Inter Bratislava	15	(3)
2007–2009	Viktoria Žižkov	65	(18)
2009–2011	1. FC Slovácko	48	(14)
2011–2015	Zbrojovka Brno	47	(15)
2013–2014	→ 1. FK Příbram (loan)	20	(3)
Total		432	(111)

International career^{‡}
1999	Czech Republic U21	1	(0)
- * Club domestic league appearances and goals as of 20 October 2016 ‡ National team caps and goals as of 22 December 2014

Petr Švancara (born 5 November 1977) is a former Czech football player.

Švancara started his football career in his native Brno, eventually playing for the local side 1. FC Brno, and, later, for several other Czech First League clubs. In 2008, his goal for FK Viktoria Žižkov in a match against Bohemians Prague was voted Czech First League goal of the year.

In June 2012, Švancara, the captain of Brno, signed a two-year extension to his contract to keep him at the club until 2014.

== Controversy ==
On 22 March 2025, Švancara shouted in the home match of the 8th tier league Říčany - Cézava B to Ukrainian players from Cézava B "Táhněte zpátky na Ukrajinu čuráci" ("Go back to Ukraine, you dickheads"). Švancara later apologized on his social media. According to Cézava team manager, Švancara in the second half encouraged his teammates to play hard on Ukrainian players. Švancara was banned by the Disciplinary commission FAČR for two mateches and fined 150,000 Czech crowns.
