= Serkan Dökme =

Turkish footballer

Personal information
- Date of birth: 18 July 1977 (age 49)
- Place of birth: Akhisar, Turkey
- Height: 1.74 m (5 ft 9 in)
- Position: Midfielder

Senior career*
| Years | Team | Apps | (Gls) |
| 1994–2000 | Altay | | |
| 2000–2004 | Samsunspor | | |
| 2004–2006 | Manisaspor | | |
| 2006–2007 | Samsunspor | | |
| 2007–2009 | Malatyaspor | | |
| 2009 | Altay | | |
| 2010 | Tokatspor | | |

International career
- Turkey U21
- * Club domestic league appearances and goals

Serkan Dökme (born 18 July 1977) is a retired Turkish football midfielder.
