= Roman Přibyl =

Czech footballer

Personal information
- Date of birth: 16 August 1973 (age 53)
- Position: Forward

Senior career*
Years	Team	Apps	(Gls)
1992–1995	Znojmo		
–1997	Petra Drnovice		
1997–1998	Rimavská Sobota		
1998–1999	Karviná		
2000	PSJ Jihlava		
2000–2004	Znojmo		
- * Club domestic league appearances and goals

Roman Přibyl (born 16 August 1973) is a retired Czech football striker.
