= Uğur Dağdelen =

Turkish footballer

Personal information
- Date of birth: 3 October 1973
- Place of birth: Amasya, Turkey]
- Date of death: 24 September 2015 (aged 41)
- Place of death: Merzifon, Amasya, Turkey
- Position: Striker

Senior career*
Years	Team	Apps	(Gls)
1990–1993	Merzifonspor	78	(33)
1993–1995	Karabükspor	40	(11)
1994–1995	→ Bursaspor (loan)	10	(2)
1995–2001	Samsunspor	80	(32)
1997–1998	→ Kayserispor (loan)	28	(14)
Total		236	(92)

International career
1998	Turkey	1	(0)
- * Club domestic league appearances and goals

Uğur Dağdelen (3 October 1973 – 24 September 2015) was a Turkish professional footballer from Amasya. He played for several clubs in Turkey in addition to the Turkey national team.

== Club career ==
Dağdelen played for Karabükspor, Bursaspor and Samsunspor in the Turkish Süper Lig, appearing in more than 140 league matches and scoring more than 30 goals.

== International career ==
Dağdelen made one appearance for the full Turkey national team in a friendly against Russia on 22 April 1998.
