= 2000–01 Deportivo de La Coruña season =

Deportivo de La Coruña
2000–01 season
- President: Augusto César Lendoiro
- Manager: Javier Irureta
- Stadium: Estadio Riazor
- La Liga: 2nd
- Copa del Rey: Round of 32
- UEFA Champions League: Quarter-finals
- Supercopa de España: Winners
- Top goalscorer: League: Diego Tristán (19); All: Diego Tristán (23)
Home colours	Away colours	Third colours

The 2000–01 season was Deportivo de La Coruña's 30th season in La Liga, the top division of Spanish football. They also competed in the Copa del Rey, the UEFA Champions League and the Supercopa de España.

== Season review ==
Deportivo, in their third season under coach Javier Irureta, began 2000–01 as defending La Liga champions, having won their first ever top flight title the previous year. This achievement qualified them for the 2000 Supercopa de España, where the faced 1999–2000 Copa del Rey winners Espanyol. After a goalless first leg at Estadi Olímpic de Montjuïc, Depor scored twice in three minutes through Djalminha and Diego Tristán at Estadio Riazor to claim the trophy with a 2–0 win. This was their second Supercopa title, having also won the competition in 1995.

Deportivo's league title also qualified them for the 2000–01 UEFA Champions League, the first time in their history they had entered Europe's elite competition. Their debut began well, as they went undefeated in their six first group stage matches to progress as group winners, ahead of Hamburg, Juventus and Panathinaikos. In the second group stage, they were drawn against Galatasaray, Milan and Paris Saint-Germain, and once again progressed as group winners. They came up against English side Leeds United in the quarter-finals, and gave themselves an uphill task by losing the first leg 3–0 at Elland Road. Despite a 2–0 victory in the second leg, Depor were eliminated 3–2 on aggregate.

The champions couldn't quite match their previous performance in La Liga, although they were still able to finish as runners-up, seven points behind Real Madrid. The real disappointment of the season was saved for the Copa del Rey, where Deportivo were beaten 3–2 by Segunda División side Tenerife in the round of 32, marking their earliest exit from the competition since 1992–93.

== Players ==
=== Squad ===
Note: Flags indicate national team as defined under FIFA eligibility rules; some limited exceptions apply. Players may hold more than one non-FIFA nationality.

No.	Pos.	Nation	Player
1	GK	CMR	Jacques Songo'o
2	DF	ESP	Manuel Pablo
3	DF	ESP	Enrique Romero
4	DF	MAR	Noureddine Naybet
5	DF	ESP	César Martín
6	MF	BRA	Mauro Silva
7	FW	NED	Roy Makaay
8	MF	BRA	Djalminha
9	FW	ESP	Diego Tristán
10	MF	ESP	Fran (captain)
11	FW	ARG	Turu Flores
12	MF	ARG	Lionel Scaloni
13	GK	ESP	José Francisco Molina

No.	Pos.	Nation	Player
14	MF	BRA	Emerson
15	DF	ESP	Joan Capdevila
16	MF	BRA	César Sampaio
17	FW	URU	Walter Pandiani
18	MF	ESP	Víctor Sánchez
19	FW	MAR	Salaheddine Bassir
20	MF	ESP	Donato
21	MF	ESP	Juan Carlos Valerón
22	DF	POR	Hélder
23	MF	ARG	Aldo Duscher
25	MF	ESP	Fernando
28	GK	ESP	Dani Mallo
31	GK	CZE	Petr Kouba

==== Left club during season ====
Note: Flags indicate national team as defined under FIFA eligibility rules; some limited exceptions apply. Players may hold more than one non-FIFA nationality.

No.	Pos.	Nation	Player
9	FW	POR	Pauleta (to Bordeaux)
24	MF	YUG	Slaviša Jokanović (to Chelsea)
—	DF	ESP	Luis Miguel Ramis (on loan to Racing Santander)

No.	Pos.	Nation	Player
—	FW	ESP	Iván Pérez (on loan to Numancia)
—	FW	BRA	Renaldo (to Lleida)

==== Out on loan for the full season ====
Note: Flags indicate national team as defined under FIFA eligibility rules; some limited exceptions apply. Players may hold more than one non-FIFA nationality.

No.	Pos.	Nation	Player
—	GK	POR	Nuno Espírito Santo (on loan at Osasuna)
—	DF	ESP	Manel (on loan at Numancia)
—	MF	ESP	Jaime (on loan at Racing Santander)

No.	Pos.	Nation	Player
—	MF	ESP	José Manuel (on loan at Numancia)
—	FW	ESP	Changui (on loan at Elche)
—	FW	URU	Sebastian Abreu (on loan at San Lorenzo)

=== Transfers ===
==== In ====
#	Pos	Player	From	Notes
Summer
9	FW	(Spain) Diego Tristán	(Spain) Mallorca	
13	GK	(Spain) José Francisco Molina	(Spain) Atlético Madrid	
14	MF	(Brazil) Emerson	(Spain) Tenerife	
15	DF	(Spain) Joan Capdevila	(Spain) Atlético Madrid	
16	MF	(Brazil) César Sampaio	(Brazil) Palmeiras	
17	FW	(Uruguay) Walter Pandiani	(Uruguay) Peñarol	
21	MF	(Spain) Juan Carlos Valerón	(Spain) Atlético Madrid	
22	DF	(Portugal) Hélder	(England) Newcastle United	Loan return
23	MF	(Argentina) Aldo Duscher	(Portugal) Sporting CP	€13 million
	GK	(Portugal) Nuno Espírito Santo	(Spain) Mérida	Loan return
	MF	(Spain) José Manuel	(Spain) Compostela	Loan return
	FW	(Spain) Changui	(Spain) Compostela	
	FW	(Brazil) Renaldo	(Spain) Las Palmas	Loan return

==== Out ====
#	Pos	Player	To	Notes
Summer
5	DF	(Argentina) Gabriel Schürrer	(Spain) Las Palmas	
9	FW	(Portugal) Pauleta	(France) Bordeaux	
16	MF	(Brazil) Flávio Conceição	(Spain) Real Madrid	€26 million
17	DF	(Spain) Manel	(Spain) Numancia	Loan
21	MF	(Spain) Jaime	(Spain) Racing Santander	Loan
24	MF	(Federal Republic of Yugoslavia) Slaviša Jokanović	(England) Chelsea	£1.7 million
	GK	(Portugal) Nuno Espírito Santo	(Spain) Osasuna	Loan
	MF	(Spain) José Manuel	(Spain) Numancia	Loan
	FW	(Spain) Changui	(Spain) Elche	Loan
	FW	(Spain) David Fernández	(Scotland) Airdrieonians	
Winter
	DF	(Spain) Luis Miguel Ramis	(Spain) Racing Santander	Loan
	FW	(Spain) Iván Pérez	(Spain) Numancia	Loan
	FW	(Brazil) Renaldo	(Spain) Lleida	

=== Squad stats ===
==== Appearances and goals ====
Last updated on 7 April 2021.

No.	Pos	Nat	Player	Total		La Liga		Copa del Rey		Champ League	
No.	Pos	Nat	Player	Apps	Goals	Apps	Goals	Apps	Goals	Apps	Goals
13	GK	(Spain) ESP	José Francisco Molina	45	0	32	0	0	0	13	0
2	DF	(Spain) ESP	Manuel Pablo	53	1	37	1	2	0	14	0
4	DF	(Morocco) MAR	Noureddine Naybet	39	3	25+1	1	0	0	13	2
3	DF	(Spain) ESP	Enrique Romero	41	0	28+1	0	0	0	12	0
18	MF	(Spain) ESP	Víctor Sánchez	46	7	26+6	5	0+2	0	10+2	2
6	MF	(Brazil) BRA	Mauro Silva	41	0	31	0	0	0	10	0
20	MF	(Spain) ESP	Donato	43	3	28+1	3	1	0	13	0
14	MF	(Brazil) BRA	Emerson	39	0	20+8	0	0	0	10+1	0
10	MF	(Spain) ESP	Fran	38	2	26+1	2	2	0	9	0
7	FW	(Netherlands) NED	Roy Makaay	38	18	21+8	16	0	0	4+5	2
9	FW	(Spain) ESP	Diego Tristán	41	22	22+7	19	1	1	6+5	2
1	GK	(Cameroon) CMR	Jacques Songo'o	12	0	6+3	0	2	0	1	0
21	MF	(Spain) ESP	Juan Carlos Valerón	41	4	20+11	4	1+1	0	4+4	0
22	DF	(Portugal) POR	Hélder	25	0	18+3	0	1	0	1+2	0
8	MF	(Brazil) BRA	Djalminha	31	12	17+4	9	0+1	0	9	3
12	MF	(Argentina) ARG	Lionel Scaloni	39	5	11+14	3	2	1	4+8	1
15	DF	(Spain) ESP	Joan Capdevila	21	0	11+5	0	2	0	2+1	0
5	DF	(Spain) ESP	César Martín	14	0	8+3	0	1	0	2	0
16	MF	(Brazil) BRA	César Sampaio	16	0	8+2	0	1	0	3+2	0
17	FW	(Uruguay) URU	Walter Pandiani	39	13	7+18	7	2	1	7+5	5
25	MF	(Spain) ESP	Fernando	20	3	7+7	3	0+1	0	1+4	0
11	FW	(Argentina) ARG	Turu Flores	21	1	7+7	0	0	0	5+2	1
23	MF	(Argentina) ARG	Aldo Duscher	8	0	1+4	0	2	0	1	0
19	FW	(Morocco) MAR	Salaheddine Bassir	0	0	0	0	0	0	0	0
28	GK	(Spain) ESP	Dani Mallo	0	0	0	0	0	0	0	0
31	GK	(Czech Republic) CZE	Petr Kouba	0	0	0	0	0	0	0	0
Players who have left the club after the start of the season:
9	FW	(Portugal) POR	Pauleta	0	0	0	0	0	0	0	0
24	MF	(Federal Republic of Yugoslavia) YUG	Slaviša Jokanović	0	0	0	0	0	0	0	0
	DF	(Spain) ESP	Luis Miguel Ramis	4	0	1	0	2	0	0+1	0
	FW	(Spain) ESP	Iván Pérez	0	0	0	0	0	0	0	0
	FW	(Brazil) BRA	Renaldo	0	0	0	0	0	0	0	0

==== Disciplinary record ====
Updated on 7 April 2021

Number	Nation	Position	Name	La Liga		Copa del Rey		Champ League		Supercopa		Total	
Number	Nation	Position	Name	Booked	Sent off (straight red)	Booked	Sent off (straight red)	Booked	Sent off (straight red)	Booked	Sent off (straight red)	Booked	Sent off (straight red)
20	(Spain)	MF	Donato	10	1	0	0	2	0	0	0	12	1
14	(Brazil)	MF	Emerson	8	0	0	0	3	0	0	0	11	0
22	(Portugal)	DF	Hélder	10	0	0	0	1	0	0	0	11	0
12	(Argentina)	MF	Lionel Scaloni	9	0	0	0	1	0	0	0	10	0
8	(Brazil)	MF	Djalminha	6	2	0	0	1	0	0	0	7	2
18	(Spain)	MF	Víctor Sánchez	7	0	0	0	1	0	1	0	9	0
4	(Morocco)	DF	Noureddine Naybet	5	1	0	0	2	0	0	0	7	1
5	(Spain)	DF	César Martín	5	0	1	0	0	0	0	0	6	0
6	(Brazil)	MF	Mauro Silva	4	0	0	0	2	0	0	0	6	0
13	(Spain)	GK	José Francisco Molina	4	1	0	0	0	0	0	0	4	1
2	(Spain)	DF	Manuel Pablo	4	0	0	0	1	0	0	0	5	0
9	(Spain)	FW	Diego Tristán	5	0	0	0	0	0	0	0	5	0
16	(Brazil)	MF	César Sampaio	5	0	0	0	0	0	0	0	5	0
17	(Uruguay)	FW	Walter Pandiani	2	1	0	0	1	0	0	0	3	1
10	(Spain)	MF	Fran	1	0	0	0	2	0	0	0	3	0
15	(Spain)	DF	Joan Capdevila	2	0	1	0	0	0	0	0	3	0
21	(Spain)	MF	Juan Carlos Valerón	2	0	1	0	0	0	0	0	3	0
3	(Spain)	DF	Enrique Romero	2	0	0	0	0	0	0	0	2	0
7	(Netherlands)	FW	Roy Makaay	2	0	0	0	0	0	0	0	2	0
23	(Argentina)	MF	Aldo Duscher	1	0	1	0	0	0	0	0	2	0
25	(Spain)	MF	Fernando Sánchez Cipitria	0	1	0	0	0	0	0	0	0	1
11	(Argentina)	FW	Turu Flores	1	0	0	0	0	0	0	0	1	0
24	(Federal Republic of Yugoslavia)	MF	Slaviša Jokanović	0	0	0	0	0	0	1	0	1	0
	(Spain)	DF	Luis Miguel Ramis	1	0	0	0	0	0	0	0	1	0
			TOTALS	96	7	4	0	17	0	2	0	119	7

== Competitions ==
=== La Liga ===
==== League table ====
Pos	Team	Pld	W	D	L	GF	GA	GD	Pts	Qualification or relegation
1	Real Madrid (C)	38	24	8	6	81	40	+41	80	Qualification for the Champions League group stage
2	Deportivo La Coruña	38	22	7	9	73	44	+29	73	Qualification for the Champions League group stage
3	Mallorca	38	20	11	7	61	43	+18	71	Qualification for the Champions League third qualifying round
4	Barcelona	38	17	12	9	80	57	+23	63 (Note: VAL 0–1 BAR; BAR 3–2 VAL)	Qualification for the Champions League third qualifying round
5	Valencia	38	18	9	11	55	34	+21	63	Qualification for the UEFA Cup first round

Source: LFP
Rules for classification: 1st points; 2nd head-to-head points; 3rd head-to-head goal difference; 4th head-to-head goals scored; 5th goal difference; 6th number of goals scored; 7th Fair-play points
(C) Champions

==== Matches ====
9 September 2000 1	Deportivo La Coruña	2 – 0	Athletic Bilbao	A Coruña, Spain
	Víctor Sánchez 53' (pen.); Pandiani 89'	Report		Stadium: Estadio Riazor; Referee: José Manuel Andradas Asurmendi

16 September 2000 2	Racing Santander	0 – 3	Deportivo La Coruña	Santander, Spain
		Report	34' Valerón; 58' Manuel Pablo; 83' Fran	Stadium: El Sardinero; Referee: Rafael Ramírez Domínguez

23 September 2000 3	Real Sociedad	1 – 1	Deportivo La Coruña	San Sebastián, Spain
	Jankauskas 5'	Report	57' Pandiani	Stadium: Anoeta; Referee: Antonio López Nieto

1 October 2000 4	Deportivo La Coruña	2 – 0	Barcelona	A Coruña, Spain
	Donato 64'; Tristán 76'	Report		Stadium: Estadio Riazor; Referee: Miguel Pérez Lasa

14 October 2000 5	Real Madrid	3 – 0	Deportivo La Coruña	Madrid, Spain
	Raúl 18'; Hierro 44' (pen.); Guti 88'	Report		Stadium: Santiago Bernabéu Stadium; Referee: Javier Turienzo Álvarez

21 October 2000 6	Deportivo La Coruña	1 – 1	Mallorca	A Coruña, Spain
	Valerón 77'	Report	85' Luque	Stadium: Estadio Riazor; Referee: Julián Rodríguez Santiago

28 October 2000 7	Numancia	1 – 2	Deportivo La Coruña	Soria, Spain
	Navarro 62'	Report	14' Donato; 29' Fernando	Stadium: Los Pajaritos; Referee: Arturo Daudén Ibáñez

31 October 2000 8	Deportivo La Coruña	4 – 0	Las Palmas	A Coruña, Spain
	Tristán 31', 47', 60'; Makaay 80'	Report		Stadium: Estadio Riazor; Referee: Juan Ansuátegui Roca

4 November 2000 9	Villarreal	3 – 2	Deportivo La Coruña	Villarreal, Spain
	Víctor 42', 83'; Moisés García 89'	Report	11' Djalminha; 68' Pandiani	Stadium: Estadio El Madrigal; Referee: Antonio Llonch Andreu

11 November 2000 10	Deportivo La Coruña	2 – 0	Real Zaragoza	A Coruña, Spain
	Tristán 41', 57'	Report		Stadium: Estadio Riazor; Referee: José Victor Esquinas Torres

18 November 2000 11	Osasuna	1 – 1	Deportivo La Coruña	Pamplona, Spain
	Cruchaga 15'	Report	1' Scaloni	Stadium: El Sadar; Referee: Alfonso Pérez

26 November 2000 12	Deportivo La Coruña	1 – 0	Celta Vigo	A Coruña, Spain
	Djalminha 75'	Report		Stadium: Estadio Riazor; Referee: Eduardo Iturralde González

2 December 2000 13	Espanyol	0 – 2	Deportivo La Coruña	Barcelona, Spain
		Report	47' Fernando; 54' Makaay	Stadium: Estadi Olímpic de Montjuïc; Referee: Manuel Mejuto González

10 December 2000 14	Deportivo La Coruña	1 – 1	Rayo Vallecano	A Coruña, Spain
	Makaay 34'	Report	71' Bolić	Stadium: Estadio Riazor; Referee: José Losantos Omar

16 December 2000 15	Deportivo Alavés	3 – 1	Deportivo La Coruña	Vitoria-Gasteiz, Spain
	Moreno 21', 26' (pen.); Alonso 72'	Report	17' Víctor Sánchez	Stadium: Mendizorrotza; Referee: Juan Fernández Marín

20 December 2000 16	Deportivo La Coruña	3 – 0	Real Oviedo	A Coruña, Spain
	Djalminha 10', 73'; Makaay 52'	Report		Stadium: Estadio Riazor; Referee: José Luis Prados García

7 January 2001 17	Real Valladolid	3 – 1	Deportivo La Coruña	Valladolid, Spain
	Pachón 75', 89'; Eusebio 89'	Report	79' Pandiani	Stadium: José Zorrilla; Referee: Alberto Undiano

13 January 2001 18	Deportivo La Coruña	2 – 0	Valencia	A Coruña, Spain
	Pandiani 87'; Makaay 89'	Report		Stadium: Estadio Riazor; Referee: Javier Turienzo Álvarez

21 January 2001 19	Málaga	1 – 3	Deportivo La Coruña	Málaga, Spain
	Silva 3'	Report	32' Makaay; 84', 89' Scaloni	Stadium: La Rosaleda; Referee: Fernando Carmona Méndez

27 January 2001 20	Athletic Bilbao	2 – 2	Deportivo La Coruña	Bilbao, Spain
	Larrainzar 7'; Larrazábal 73' (pen.)	Report	36', 39' Makaay	Stadium: San Mamés; Referee: Arturo Daudén Ibáñez

4 February 2001 21	Deportivo La Coruña	2 – 1	Racing Santander	A Coruña, Spain
	Makaay 3', 33'	Report	31' Colsa	Stadium: Estadio Riazor; Referee: Carlos Megía Dávila

10 February 2001 22	Deportivo La Coruña	4 – 1	Real Sociedad	A Coruña, Spain
	Tristán 4', 41', 62'; Donato 25'	Report	67' de Pedro	Stadium: Estadio Riazor; Referee: Alfonso Pérez

17 February 2001 23	Barcelona	2 – 3	Deportivo La Coruña	Barcelona, Spain
	Rivaldo 14' (pen.); Enrique 34'	Report	5' Djalminha; 76', 89' Víctor Sánchez	Stadium: Camp Nou; Referee: Luis Medina Cantalejo

24 February 2001 24	Deportivo La Coruña	2 – 2	Real Madrid	A Coruña, Spain
	Djalminha 47' (pen.); Tristán 85'	Report	6' (o.g.) Hélder; 44' (pen.) Figo	Stadium: Estadio Riazor; Referee: José Manuel Andradas Asurmendi

3 March 2001 25	Mallorca	2 – 1	Deportivo La Coruña	Palma de Mallorca, Spain
	Eto'o 2'; Ibagaza 62'	Report	78' Makaay	Stadium: Estadi de Son Moix; Referee: José María García-Aranda

10 March 2001 26	Deportivo La Coruña	4 – 1	Numancia	A Coruña, Spain
	Pandiani 49', 59'; Tristán 57', 89'	Report	62' Jaume	Stadium: Estadio Riazor; Referee: Eduardo Iturralde González

17 March 2001 27	Las Palmas	2 – 0	Deportivo La Coruña	Las Palmas, Spain
	Josico 4'; Álvaro 46'	Report		Stadium: Estadio Insular; Referee: César Muñiz Fernández

31 March 2001 28	Deportivo La Coruña	4 – 2	Villarreal	A Coruña, Spain
	Djalminha 19'; Tristán 41', 84'; Makaay 88'	Report	66' (pen.) Víctor; 89' Gracia	Stadium: Estadio Riazor; Referee: José Bueno Grimal

8 April 2001 29	Real Zaragoza	2 – 1	Deportivo La Coruña	Zaragoza, Spain
	Jamelli 41'; Esnáider 81'	Report	86' Naybet	Stadium: La Romareda; Referee: Miguel Pérez Lasa

14 April 2001 30	Deportivo La Coruña	2 – 1	Osasuna	A Coruña, Spain
	Makaay 51'; Fernando 86'	Report	24' Rosado	Stadium: Estadio Riazor; Referee: Juan Fernández Marín

21 April 2001 31	Celta Vigo	2 – 1	Deportivo La Coruña	Vigo, Spain
	Đorović 57'; Mostovoi 69'	Report	54' Valerón	Stadium: Balaídos; Referee: Manuel Mejuto González

29 April 2001 32	Deportivo La Coruña	1 – 0	Espanyol	A Coruña, Spain
	Fran 19'	Report		Stadium: Estadio Riazor; Referee: Arturo Daudén Ibáñez

6 May 2001 33	Rayo Vallecano	1 – 1	Deportivo La Coruña	Madrid, Spain
	Bolo 56'	Report	70' Valerón	Stadium: Estadio Teresa Rivero; Referee: Antonio López Nieto

11 May 2001 34	Deportivo La Coruña	2 – 1	Deportivo Alavés	A Coruña, Spain
	Tristán 45' (pen.), 53' (pen.)	Report	14' (pen.) Moreno	Stadium: Estadio Riazor; Referee: Rafael Ramírez Domínguez

20 May 2001 35	Real Oviedo	2 – 3	Deportivo La Coruña	Oviedo, Spain
	Jaime 54'; Paunović 70'	Report	16', 21', 58' Tristán	Stadium: Carlos Tartiere; Referee: Juan Fernández Marín

27 May 2001 36	Deportivo La Coruña	1 – 2	Real Valladolid	A Coruña, Spain
	Makaay 75'	Report	44' Kaviedes; 63' Sales	Stadium: Estadio Riazor; Referee: Antonio Llonch Andreu

10 June 2001 37	Valencia	0 – 1	Deportivo La Coruña	Valencia, Spain
		Report	68' Makaay	Stadium: Mestalla Stadium; Referee: Fernando Carmona Méndez

17 June 2001 38	Deportivo La Coruña	4 – 0	Málaga	A Coruña, Spain
	Djalminha 8', 48'; Makaay 58'; Víctor Sánchez 79'	Report		Stadium: Estadio Riazor; Referee: Miguel Pérez Lasa

=== Copa del Rey ===
Win Draw Loss

Round	Opponent	Venue	Result	Goals	Ref
Round of 64	Universidad Las Palmas	A	1–0	1–0 77' Tristán	
Round of 32	Tenerife	A	2–3	1–0 27' Scaloni; 1–1 56' Morales; 1–2 79' Simutenkov; 1–3 84' Simutenkov; 2–3 90' Pandiani	

=== UEFA Champions League ===
==== First group stage ====
Pos	Team	Pld	W	D	L	GF	GA	GD	Pts	Qualification
1	(Spain) Deportivo La Coruña	6	2	4	0	6	4	+2	10	Advance to second group stage
2	(Greece) Panathinaikos	6	2	2	2	6	5	+1	8	Advance to second group stage
3	(Germany) Hamburg	6	1	3	2	9	9	0	6	Transfer to UEFA Cup
4	(Italy) Juventus	6	1	3	2	9	12	−3	6	

Source: UEFA

13 September 2000 1	Panathinaikos (Greece)	1 – 1	(Spain) Deportivo La Coruña	Athens, Greece
20:45	Warzycha 29'	Report	84' Naybet	Stadium: Olympic Stadium; Attendance: 48,050; Referee: Hugh Dallas (Scotland)

19 September 2000 2	Deportivo La Coruña (Spain)	2 – 1	(Germany) Hamburg	A Coruña, Spain
20:45	Pandiani 44'; Scaloni 90+4'	Report	53' Barbarez	Stadium: Estadio Riazor; Attendance: 20,050; Referee: Dick Jol (Netherlands)

26 September 2000 3	Juventus (Italy)	0 – 0	(Spain) Deportivo La Coruña	Turin, Italy
20:45		Report		Stadium: Stadio delle Alpi; Attendance: 35,425; Referee: Rune Pedersen (Norway)

18 October 2000 4	Deportivo La Coruña (Spain)	1 – 1	(Italy) Juventus	A Coruña, Spain
20:45	Víctor Sánchez 11'	Report	10' Inzaghi	Stadium: Estadio Riazor; Attendance: 25,800; Referee: Gilles Veissière (France)

24 October 2000 5	Deportivo La Coruña (Spain)	1 – 0	(Greece) Panathinaikos	A Coruña, Spain
20:45	Pandiani 82'	Report		Stadium: Estadio Riazor; Attendance: 22,325; Referee: Kim Milton Nielsen (Denmark)

8 November 2000 6	Hamburg (Germany)	1 – 1	(Spain) Deportivo La Coruña	Hamburg, Germany
20:45	Mahdavikia 10'	Report	58' Makaay	Stadium: Volksparkstadion; Attendance: 48,500; Referee: Alain Hamer (Luxembourg)

==== Second group stage ====
Pos	Team	Pld	W	D	L	GF	GA	GD	Pts	Qualification
1	(Spain) Deportivo La Coruña	6	3	1	2	10	7	+3	10	Advance to knockout stage
2	(Turkey) Galatasaray	6	3	1	2	6	6	0	10	Advance to knockout stage
3	(Italy) Milan	6	1	4	1	6	7	−1	7	
4	(France) Paris Saint-Germain	6	1	2	3	8	10	−2	5	

Source: UEFA

21 November 2000 1	Paris Saint-Germain (France)	1 – 3	(Spain) Deportivo La Coruña	Paris, France
20:45	Algerino 37'	Report	64' Naybet; 70' Flores; 90+2' Makaay	Stadium: Parc des Princes; Attendance: 31,900; Referee: Hellmut Krug (Germany)

6 December 2000 2	Deportivo La Coruña (Spain)	0 – 1	(Italy) Milan	A Coruña, Spain
20:45		Report	45+1' Helveg	Stadium: Estadio Riazor; Attendance: 34,775; Referee: Graham Poll (England)

14 February 2001 3	Galatasaray (Turkey)	1 – 0	(Spain) Deportivo La Coruña	Istanbul, Turkey
20:45	Kaya 11'	Report		Stadium: Ali Sami Yen Stadium; Attendance: 20,150; Referee: Kim Milton Nielsen (Denmark)

20 February 2001 4	Deportivo La Coruña (Spain)	2 – 0	(Turkey) Galatasaray	A Coruña, Spain
20:45	Víctor Sánchez 40'; Djalminha 73' (pen.)	Report		Stadium: Estadio Riazor; Attendance: 24,050; Referee: Hartmut Strampe (Germany)

7 March 2001 5	Deportivo La Coruña (Spain)	4 – 3	(France) Paris Saint-Germain	A Coruña, Spain
20:45	Pandiani 57', 76', 84'; Tristán 60'	Report	29' Okocha; 43', 55' Leroy	Stadium: Estadio Riazor; Attendance: 35,000; Referee: Urs Meier (Switzerland)

13 March 2001 6	Milan (Italy)	1 – 1	(Spain) Deportivo La Coruña	Milan, Italy
20:45	Shevchenko 86' (pen.)	Report	74' (pen.) Djalminha	Stadium: San Siro; Attendance: 70,103; Referee: Hugh Dallas (Scotland)

==== Knockout stage ====
4 April 2001 Quarter-finals; First leg	Leeds United (England)	3 – 0	(Spain) Deportivo La Coruña	Leeds, England
20:45 CET	Harte 26'; Smith 51'; Ferdinand 66'	Report		Stadium: Elland Road; Attendance: 35,508; Referee: Gilles Veissière (France)

17 April 2001 Quarter-finals; Second leg	Deportivo La Coruña (Spain)	2 – 0	(England) Leeds United	A Coruña, Spain
20:45 CET	Djalminha 9' (pen.); Tristán 73'	Report		Stadium: Estadio Riazor; Attendance: 35,600; Referee: Stefano Braschi (Italy)

Leeds United won 3–2 on aggregate

=== Supercopa de España ===
Win Draw Loss

Round	Opponent	Aggregate	First leg				Second leg			
Round	Opponent	Aggregate	Venue	Result	Goals	Ref	Venue	Result	Goals	Ref
Final	Espanyol	2–0	A	0–0			H	2–0	1–0 57' Djalminha; 2–0 60' Tristán	
