= 2001–02 Deportivo de La Coruña season =

Deportivo de La Coruña
2001–02 season
- President: Augusto César Lendoiro
- Manager: Javier Irureta
- Stadium: Estadio Riazor
- La Liga: 2nd
- Copa del Rey: Winners
- UEFA Champions League: Quarter-finals
- FIFA Club World Championship: Cancelled
- Top goalscorer: League: Diego Tristán (20); All: Diego Tristán (31)
- Average home league attendance: 29,368
Home colours	Away colours	Third colours

The 2001–02 season was Deportivo de La Coruña's 31st season in La Liga, the top division of Spanish football. They also competed in the Copa del Rey and the UEFA Champions League.

== Season summary ==
Javier Irureta's fourth season in charge of Deportivo was another successful one, as they finished as La Liga runners-up for the second consecutive year, seven points behind champions Valencia. Diego Tristán's 20 league goals saw him become the first Depor player to win the Pichichi Trophy since Bebeto in 1992–93. Deportivo also tasted success in the Copa del Rey, beating Real Madrid in the final to lift the trophy for the second time in their history, and the first since 1994–95.

In the UEFA Champions League, they progressed as group winners from the first group stage. They were undefeated in their six matches, which included a fine 3–2 win over Manchester United at Old Trafford. They received a tough draw in the second group stage, where they faced Arsenal, Bayer Leverkusen and Juventus. Despite two defeats by the German side, they progressed as runners-up, level on points with group winners Leverkusen. They once again faced Manchester United in the quarter-finals, but couldn't repeat the success of the group stages as the English side won 5–2 on aggregate. Depor's quarter-final exit matched their performance from the previous year.

== Players ==
=== Squad ===
Note: Flags indicate national team as defined under FIFA eligibility rules; some limited exceptions apply. Players may hold more than one non-FIFA nationality.

No.	Pos.	Nation	Player
1	GK	ESP	José Francisco Molina
2	DF	ESP	Manuel Pablo
3	DF	ESP	Enrique Romero
4	DF	MAR	Noureddine Naybet
5	DF	ESP	César Martín
6	MF	BRA	Mauro Silva
7	FW	NED	Roy Makaay
8	MF	BRA	Djalminha
9	FW	ESP	Diego Tristán
10	MF	ESP	Fran (captain)
11	MF	ESP	José Amavisca
12	MF	ARG	Lionel Scaloni
13	GK	POR	Nuno Espírito Santo

No.	Pos.	Nation	Player
14	MF	BRA	Emerson
15	DF	ESP	Joan Capdevila
16	MF	ESP	Sergio
17	FW	URU	Walter Pandiani
18	MF	ESP	Víctor Sánchez
19	DF	YUG	Goran Đorović
20	MF	ESP	Donato
21	MF	ESP	Juan Carlos Valerón
22	DF	POR	Hélder
23	MF	ARG	Aldo Duscher
24	DF	ESP	Héctor
25	MF	ESP	José Manuel
26	GK	ESP	Dani Mallo

==== Left club during season ====
Note: Flags indicate national team as defined under FIFA eligibility rules; some limited exceptions apply. Players may hold more than one non-FIFA nationality.

No.	Pos.	Nation	Player
—	MF	BRA	César Sampaio (to Corinthians)

No.	Pos.	Nation	Player
—	FW	ESP	Changui (on loan to Polideportivo Ejido)
—	FW	URU	Sebastian Abreu (on loan at Nacional)

==== Out on loan for the full season ====
Note: Flags indicate national team as defined under FIFA eligibility rules; some limited exceptions apply. Players may hold more than one non-FIFA nationality.

No.	Pos.	Nation	Player
—	DF	ESP	Manel (on loan at Tenerife)
—	MF	ESP	Fernando (on loan at Osasuna)
—	MF	ESP	Jaime (on loan at Tenerife)

No.	Pos.	Nation	Player
—	FW	ARG	Turu Flores (on loan at Real Valladolid)
—	FW	ESP	Iván Pérez (on loan at Leganés)
—	FW	URU	Sebastian Abreu (on loan at Cruz Azul) (January)

=== Transfers ===
==== In ====
#	Pos	Player	From	Notes
Summer
11	MF	(Spain) José Amavisca	(Spain) Racing Santander	300 million Pta
13	GK	(Portugal) Nuno Espírito Santo	(Spain) Osasuna	Loan return
16	MF	(Spain) Sergio	(Spain) Espanyol	
19	DF	(Federal Republic of Yugoslavia) Goran Đorović	(Spain) Celta Vigo	
24	DF	(Spain) Héctor	(Spain) Sevilla	Free
25	MF	(Spain) José Manuel	(Spain) Numancia	Loan return
	DF	(Spain) Manel	(Spain) Numancia	Loan return
	DF	(Spain) Luis Miguel Ramis	(Spain) Racing Santander	Loan return
	MF	(Spain) Jaime	(Spain) Racing Santander	Loan return
	FW	(Spain) Changui	(Spain) Elche	Loan return
	FW	(Spain) Iván Pérez	(Spain) Numancia	Loan return
	MF	(Brazil) Cesar Sampaio	(Brazil) Palmeiras	

==== Out ====
#	Pos	Player	To	Notes
Summer
1	GK	(Cameroon) Jacques Songo'o	(France) Metz	
11	FW	(Argentina) Turu Flores	(Spain) Real Valladolid	Loan
19	FW	(Morocco) Salaheddine Bassir	(France) Lille	
25	MF	(Spain) Fernando	(Spain) Osasuna	Loan
31	GK	(Czech Republic) Petr Kouba	(Czech Republic) Jablonec	
	DF	(Spain) Manel	(Spain) Tenerife	Loan
	DF	(Spain) Luis Miguel Ramis	(Spain) Gimnàstic de Tarragona	
	MF	(Spain) Jaime	(Spain) Tenerife	Loan
	FW	(Spain) Iván Pérez	(Spain) Leganés	Loan
Winter
	MF	(Brazil) César Sampaio	(Brazil) Corinthians	
	FW	(Spain) Changui	(Spain) Polideportivo Ejido	Loan

=== Squad stats ===
==== Appearances and goals ====
Last updated on 7 April 2021.

No.	Pos	Nat	Player	Total		La Liga		Copa del Rey		Champ League	
No.	Pos	Nat	Player	Apps	Goals	Apps	Goals	Apps	Goals	Apps	Goals
1	GK	(Spain) ESP	Molina	50	0	36	0	3	0	11	0
12	MF	(Argentina) ARG	Lionel Scaloni	42	2	21+4	2	5+1	0	8+3	0
4	DF	(Morocco) MAR	Naybet	38	4	24	2	2	0	12	2
3	DF	(Spain) ESP	Romero	38	0	23+1	0	3	0	11	0
18	MF	(Spain) ESP	Víctor Sánchez	40	4	25+4	3	2	1	9	0
6	MF	(Brazil) BRA	Mauro Silva	42	0	25+2	0	5	0	10	0
10	MF	(Spain) ESP	Fran	36	5	22+2	4	4	0	8	1
16	MF	(Spain) ESP	Sergio	52	6	28+10	4	2+2	1	7+3	1
21	AM	(Spain) ESP	Valeron	53	6	32+4	3	3+1	0	10+3	3
7	FW	(Netherlands) NED	Makaay	41	14	22+8	12	1+1	1	5+4	1
9	FW	(Spain) ESP	Tristan	52	31	25+9	20	5+1	5	10+2	6
13	GK	(Portugal) POR	Nuno	10	0	2	0	4	0	3+1	0
2	DF	(Spain) ESP	Manuel Pablo	7	0	5	0	0	0	2	0
5	DF	(Spain) ESP	Cesar	29	1	15+2	0	6	1	6	0
8	MF	(Brazil) BRA	Djalminha	32	3	5+13	1	4+2	0	3+5	2
11	MF	(Spain) ESP	José Amavisca	38	3	16+12	3	1+1	0	4+4	0
14	MF	(Brazil) BRA	Emerson	25	0	3+12	0	4	0	6	0
15	DF	(Spain) ESP	Capdevila	35	2	18+2	0	4+3	1	3+5	1
17	FW	(Uruguay) URU	Pandiani	33	8	3+15	5	3+2	2	3+7	1
19	DF	(Federal Republic of Yugoslavia) YUG	Goran Đorović	12	0	8+2	0	2	0	0	0
20	MF	(Brazil) BRA	Donato	28	2	17	2	3	0	7+1	0
22	DF	(Portugal) POR	Hélder	13	0	7+2	0	1+1	0	2	0
23	MF	(Argentina) ARG	Duscher	35	0	18+3	0	3+2	0	5+4	0
24	DF	(Spain) ESP	Héctor	34	0	18+3	0	5	0	8	0
25	MF	(Spain) ESP	José Manuel	9	1	0+4	0	2+2	1	1	0
26	GK	(Spain) ESP	Mallo	1	0	0	0	0+1	0	0	0
Players who have left the club after the start of the season:
	MF	(Brazil) BRA	César Sampaio	0	0	0	0	0	0	0	0
	FW	(Spain) ESP	Changui	0	0	0	0	0	0	0	0

==== Goal scorers ====
Place	Position	Nation	Number	Name	La Liga	Copa del Rey	Champ League	Total
1	FW	(Spain)	9	Diego Tristán	20	5	6	31
2	FW	(Netherlands)	7	Roy Makaay	12	1	1	14
3	FW	(Uruguay)	17	Walter Pandiani	5	2	1	8
4	MF	(Spain)	16	Sergio	4	1	1	6
4	MF	(Spain)	21	Juan Carlos Valerón	3	0	3	6
6	MF	(Spain)	10	Fran	4	0	1	5
7	DF	(Morocco)	4	Noureddine Naybet	2	0	2	4
7	MF	(Spain)	18	Víctor Sánchez	3	1	0	4
9	MF	(Brazil)	8	Djalminha	1	0	2	3
9	MF	(Spain)	11	José Amavisca	3	0	0	3
11	MF	(Argentina)	12	Lionel Scaloni	2	0	0	2
11	DF	(Spain)	15	Joan Capdevila	0	1	1	2
11	MF	(Spain)	20	Donato	2	0	0	2
14	DF	(Spain)	5	César Martín	0	1	0	1
14	MF	(Spain)	25	José Manuel	0	1	0	1
				Own goals	4	0	1	5
				TOTALS	65	13	19	97

==== Disciplinary record ====
Updated on 7 April 2021

Number	Nation	Position	Name	La Liga		Copa del Rey		Champ League		Total	
Number	Nation	Position	Name	Booked	Sent off (straight red)	Booked	Sent off (straight red)	Booked	Sent off (straight red)	Booked	Sent off (straight red)
12	(Argentina)	MF	Lionel Scaloni	7	0	2	0	3	1	12	1
23	(Argentina)	MF	Aldo Duscher	10	0	1	0	1	1	12	1
5	(Spain)	DF	César Martín	5	2	2	0	0	0	7	2
6	(Brazil)	MF	Mauro Silva	5	1	1	0	1	0	7	1
18	(Spain)	MF	Víctor Sánchez	4	0	1	0	3	0	8	0
4	(Morocco)	DF	Noureddine Naybet	5	1	1	0	0	0	6	1
9	(Spain)	FW	Diego Tristán	5	0	0	0	2	0	7	0
15	(Spain)	DF	Joan Capdevila	4	0	1	0	2	0	7	0
16	(Spain)	MF	Sergio	4	0	1	0	1	0	6	0
24	(Spain)	DF	Héctor	3	0	1	0	2	0	6	0
17	(Uruguay)	FW	Walter Pandiani	3	0	1	1	0	0	4	1
14	(Brazil)	MF	Emerson	2	0	2	0	1	0	5	0
3	(Spain)	DF	Enrique Romero	1	0	0	1	2	0	3	1
1	(Spain)	GK	José Francisco Molina	2	0	1	0	1	0	4	0
11	(Spain)	MF	José Amavisca	4	0	0	0	0	0	4	0
20	(Spain)	MF	Donato	3	0	0	0	1	0	4	0
8	(Brazil)	MF	Djalminha	2	0	0	0	1	0	3	0
10	(Spain)	MF	Fran	1	0	2	0	0	0	3	0
21	(Spain)	MF	Juan Carlos Valerón	2	0	0	0	0	0	2	0
25	(Spain)	MF	José Manuel	1	0	1	0	0	0	2	0
19	(Federal Republic of Yugoslavia)	DF	Goran Đorović	0	0	1	0	0	0	1	0
22	(Portugal)	DF	Hélder	1	0	0	0	0	0	1	0
			TOTALS	74	4	19	2	21	2	114	8

== Competitions ==
=== La Liga ===
==== League table ====
Pos	Team	Pld	W	D	L	GF	GA	GD	Pts	Qualification or relegation
1	Valencia (C)	38	21	12	5	51	27	+24	75	Qualification for the Champions League group stage
2	Deportivo La Coruña	38	20	8	10	65	41	+24	68	Qualification for the Champions League group stage
3	Real Madrid (Note: Real Madrid qualified directly for the 2002–03 UEFA Champions League as holders.)	38	19	9	10	69	44	+25	66	Qualification for the Champions League group stage
4	Barcelona	38	18	10	10	65	37	+28	64	Qualification for the Champions League third qualifying round
5	Celta Vigo	38	16	12	10	64	46	+18	60	Qualification for the UEFA Cup first round

Source: LFP
Rules for classification: 1st points; 2nd head-to-head points; 3rd head-to-head goal difference; 4th head-to-head goals scored; 5th goal difference; 6th number of goals scored; 7th Fair-play points
(C) Champions

==== Matches ====
26 August 2001 1	Deportivo La Coruña	4 – 0	Real Valladolid	A Coruña, Spain
	Víctor Sánchez 45'; Valerón 61'; Makaay 66'; Tristán 68'	Report		Stadium: Estadio Riazor; Referee: César Muñiz Fernández

8 September 2001 2	Las Palmas	0 – 1	Deportivo La Coruña	Las Palmas, Spain
		Report	88' Fran	Stadium: Estadio Insular; Referee: Alfonso Pérez

15 September 2001 3	Deportivo La Coruña	1 – 2	Athletic Bilbao	A Coruña, Spain
	Tristán 61'	Report	35' Guerrero; 52' Urzaiz	Stadium: Estadio Riazor; Referee: Julián Rodríguez Santiago

22 September 2001 4	Alavés	2 – 3	Deportivo La Coruña	Vitoria-Gasteiz, Spain
	Llorens 62'; Coloccini 84'	Report	24', 49' Amavisca	Stadium: Mendizorrotza; Referee: Juan Fernández Marín

30 September 2001 5	Deportivo La Coruña	2 – 2	Celta Vigo	A Coruña, Spain
	Juanfran 70' (o.g.); Pandiani 80' (pen.)	Report	22' Berizzo; 67' Edu	Stadium: Estadio Riazor; Referee: Alberto Undiano

3 October 2001 6	Villarreal	1 – 1	Deportivo La Coruña	Villarreal, Spain
	Víctor 2'	Report	64' Donato	Stadium: Estadio El Madrigal; Referee: Antonio López Nieto

6 October 2001 7	Deportivo La Coruña	2 – 1	Barcelona	A Coruña, Spain
	Fran 51', 67'	Report	37' Kluivert	Stadium: Estadio Riazor; Referee: José Victor Esquinas Torres

13 October 2001 8	Real Zaragoza	1 – 2	Deportivo La Coruña	Zaragoza, Spain
	Yordi 69'	Report	14', 58' Tristán	Stadium: La Romareda; Referee: Alexis Pérez Pérez

20 October 2001 9	Deportivo La Coruña	1 – 0	Sevilla	A Coruña, Spain
	Tristán 25'	Report		Stadium: Estadio Riazor; Referee: Manuel Mejuto González

27 October 2001 10	Rayo Vallecano	2 – 1	Deportivo La Coruña	Madrid, Spain
	Bolić 48'; Gláucio 71'	Report	65' Pandiani	Stadium: Estadio Teresa Rivero; Referee: Luis Medina Cantalejo

4 November 2001 11	Deportivo La Coruña	5 – 1	Osasuna	A Coruña, Spain
	Tristán 18', 26'; Donato 36'; Amavisca 38'; Makaay 66'	Report	8' Aloisi	Stadium: Estadio Riazor; Referee: Carlos Megía Dávila

11 November 2001 12	Tenerife	3 – 1	Deportivo La Coruña	Santa Cruz de Tenerife, Spain
	Marioni 15', 47'; Morales 71'	Report	40' Víctor Sánchez	Stadium: Heliodoro Rodríguez López; Referee: Juan Ansuátegui Roca

17 November 2001 13	Deportivo La Coruña	3 – 1	Real Sociedad	A Coruña, Spain
	Makaay 35', 56', 75'	Report	7' Alonso	Stadium: Estadio Riazor; Referee: Arturo Daudén Ibáñez

25 November 2001 14	Mallorca	4 – 1	Deportivo La Coruña	Palma de Mallorca, Spain
	Luque 7', 27'; Paunović 51'; Campano 79'	Report	29' Pandiani	Stadium: Estadi de San Moix; Referee: José Losantos Omar

1 December 2001 15	Espanyol	1 – 0	Deportivo La Coruña	Barcelona, Spain
	Tamudo 49'	Report		Stadium: Estadi Olímpic Lluís Companys; Referee: Miguel Pérez Lasa

9 December 2001 16	Deportivo La Coruña	1 – 0	Valencia	A Coruña, Spain
	Tristán 59' (pen.)	Report		Stadium: Estadio Riazor; Referee: Rafael Ramírez Domínguez

16 December 2001 17	Málaga	1 – 1	Deportivo La Coruña	Málaga, Spain
	Silva 31'	Report	78' Naybet	Stadium: La Rosaleda; Referee: Jesús Téllez Sánchez

22 December 2001 18	Deportivo La Coruña	2 – 0	Real Betis	A Coruña, Spain
	Makaay 8'; Sergio 72'	Report		Stadium: Estadio Riazor; Referee: Fernando Carmona Méndez

5 January 2002 19	Real Madrid	3 – 1	Deportivo La Coruña	Madrid, Spain
	Morientes 5'; Zidane 9'; Raúl 64'	Report	7' (pen.) Makaay	Stadium: Santiago Bernabéu Stadium; Referee: Alberto Undiano

13 January 2002 20	Real Valladolid	3 – 0	Deportivo La Coruña	Valladolid, Spain
	Marcos 30'; Fernando 31', 57'	Report		Stadium: José Zorrilla; Referee: Alfonso Pino Zamorano

20 January 2002 21	Deportivo La Coruña	1 – 0	Las Palmas	A Coruña, Spain
	González 64' (o.g.)	Report		Stadium: Estadio Riazor; Referee: José Victor Esquinas Torres

27 January 2002 22	Athletic Bilbao	1 – 1	Deportivo La Coruña	Bilbao, Spain
	Ezquerro 65'	Report	63' Djalminha	Stadium: San Mamés; Referee: Carlos Megía Dávila

2 February 2002 23	Deportivo La Coruña	0 – 1	Alavés	A Coruña, Spain
		Report	41' Astudillo	Stadium: Estadio Riazor; Referee: Javier Turienzo Álvarez

5 February 2002 24	Celta Vigo	0 – 2	Deportivo La Coruña	Vigo, Spain
		Report	31', 64' Tristán	Stadium: Balaídos; Referee: Luis Medina Cantalejo

10 February 2002 25	Deportivo La Coruña	0 – 0	Villarreal	A Coruña, Spain
		Report		Stadium: Estadio Riazor; Referee: Alberto Undiano

16 February 2002 26	Barcelona	3 – 2	Deportivo La Coruña	Barcelona, Spain
	Martín 16' (o.g.); Saviola 73'; Kluivert 88'	Report	10' Tristán; 66' Sergio	Stadium: Camp Nou; Referee: Miguel Pérez Lasa

23 February 2002 27	Deportivo La Coruña	1 – 0	Real Zaragoza	A Coruña, Spain
	Tristán 20'	Report		Stadium: Estadio Riazor; Referee: Alexis Pérez Pérez

2 March 2002 28	Sevilla	0 – 1	Deportivo La Coruña	Seville, Spain
		Report	53' Makaay	Stadium: Ramón Sánchez Pizjuán; Referee: Eduardo Iturralde González

9 March 2002 29	Deportivo La Coruña	1 – 1	Rayo Vallecano	A Coruña, Spain
	Pandiani 8'	Report	34' Bolić	Stadium: Estadio Riazor; Referee: Antonio López Nieto

16 March 2002 30	Osasuna	1 – 3	Deportivo La Coruña	Pamplona, Spain
	Aloisi 90' (pen.)	Report	5', 32' (pen.) Tristán; 18' (o.g.) Unzué	Stadium: El Sadar; Referee: Luis Medina Cantalejo

24 March 2002 31	Deportivo La Coruña	3 – 1	Tenerife	A Coruña, Spain
	Scaloni 74', 82'; Makaay 85'	Report	29' Lussenhoff	Stadium: Estadio Riazor; Referee: Alberto Undiano

30 March 2002 32	Real Sociedad	1 – 1	Deportivo La Coruña	San Sebastián, Spain
	Idiakez 34'	Report	53' Valerón	Stadium: Anoeta; Referee: Alfonso Pérez

6 April 2002 33	Deportivo La Coruña	5 – 0	Mallorca	A Coruña, Spain
	Tristán 21', 27', 33'; Víctor Sánchez 39'; Sergio 62'	Report		Stadium: Estadio Riazor; Referee: Juan Ansuátegui Roca

14 April 2002 34	Deportivo La Coruña	3 – 1	Espanyol	A Coruña, Spain
	Makaay 1', 33'; Tristán 6'	Report	68' Rotchen	Stadium: Estadio Riazor; Referee: Carlos Megía Dávila

21 April 2002 35	Valencia	1 – 0	Deportivo La Coruña	Valencia, Spain
	Duscher 70' (o.g.)	Report		Stadium: Mestalla Stadium; Referee: Manuel Mejuto González

28 April 2002 36	Deportivo La Coruña	2 – 2	Málaga	A Coruña, Spain
	Naybet 37'; Contreras 77' (o.g.)	Report	28' Silva; 80' (pen.) Dely Valdés	Stadium: Estadio Riazor; Referee: Jesús Téllez Sánchez

5 May 2002 37	Real Betis	0 – 3	Deportivo La Coruña	Seville, Spain
		Report	18', 58' Tristán; 60' Valerón	Stadium: Estadio Manuel Ruiz de Lopera; Referee: Julián Rodríguez Santiago

10 May 2002 38	Deportivo La Coruña	3 – 0	Real Madrid	A Coruña, Spain
	Makaay 45'; Fran 73'; Pandiani 89'	Report		Stadium: Estadio Riazor; Referee: Antonio López Nieto

=== Copa del Rey ===
Win Draw Loss

Round	Opponent	Venue	Result	Goals	Ref
Round of 64	Marino	A	4–1	0–1 13' Benéitez; 1–1 36' Martín; 2–1 39' Pandiani; 3–1 43' Víctor Sánchez; 4–1 54' Pandiani	
Round of 32	Cultural Leonesa	A	2–1	0–1 70' Ibáñez; 1–1 75' Tristán; 2–1 80' Tristán	

Round	Opponent	Aggregate	First leg				Second leg			
Round	Opponent	Aggregate	Venue	Result	Goals	Ref	Venue	Result	Goals	Ref
Round of 16	L'Hospitalet	–	N	–			H	–		
Quarter-finals	Real Valladolid	3–2	H	2–0	1–0 46' Capdevila; 2–0 61' Makaay		A	1–2 (a.e.t.)	0–1 3' Fernando; 0–2 34' Mario Abrante; 1–2 110' (pen.) Tristán	
Semi-finals	Figueres	2–1	A	1–0	1–0 5' Tristán		H	1–1	1–0 6' José Manuel; 1–1 90' (pen.) Piti	

1. Deportivo La Coruña successfully appealed against the first leg of their round of 16 tie being played at Estadi Municipal in L'Hospitalet de Llobregat due to its artificial pitch. When told to move the match to Mini Estadi in Barcelona, L'Hospitalet forfeited the tie.

==== Final ====
6 March 2002	Real Madrid	1 – 2	Deportivo La Coruña	Madrid, Spain
21:00 CET	Raúl 58'	Report	6' Sergio; 37' Tristán	Stadium: Santiago Bernabéu Stadium; Attendance: 75,000; Referee: Manuel Mejuto González

=== UEFA Champions League ===
==== First group stage ====
Pos	Team	Pld	W	D	L	GF	GA	GD	Pts	Qualification
1	(Spain) Deportivo La Coruña	6	2	4	0	10	8	+2	10	Advance to second group stage
2	(England) Manchester United	6	3	1	2	10	6	+4	10	Advance to second group stage
3	(France) Lille	6	1	3	2	7	7	0	6	Transfer to UEFA Cup
4	(Greece) Olympiacos	6	1	2	3	6	12	−6	5	

Source: RSSSF

18 September 2001 1	Deportivo La Coruña (Spain)	2 – 2	(Greece) Olympiacos	A Coruña, Spain
20:45	Fran 22'; Valerón 90+4'	Report	80' Giannakopoulos; 83' Ofori-Quaye	Stadium: Estadio Riazor; Attendance: 20,873; Referee: Jan Wegereef (Netherlands)

25 September 2001 2	Deportivo La Coruña (Spain)	2 – 1	(England) Manchester United	A Coruña, Spain
20:45	Pandiani 86'; Naybet 90'	Report	40' Scholes	Stadium: Estadio Riazor; Attendance: 33,108; Referee: Stefano Braschi (Italy)

10 October 2001 3	Lille (France)	1 – 1	(Spain) Deportivo La Coruña	Lens, France
20:45	Olufade 87'	Report	49' Valerón	Stadium: Stade Félix-Bollaert; Attendance: 37,020; Referee: Claus Bo Larsen (Denmark)

17 October 2001 4	Manchester United (England)	2 – 3	(Spain) Deportivo La Coruña	Manchester, England
20:45	van Nistelrooy 7', 40'	Report	37' Sergio; 39', 60' Tristán	Stadium: Old Trafford; Attendance: 65,585; Referee: Herbert Fandel (Germany)

23 October 2001 5	Deportivo La Coruña (Spain)	1 – 1	(France) Lille	A Coruña, Spain
20:45	Valerón 14' (pen.)	Report	20' (pen.) Cheyrou	Stadium: Estadio Riazor; Attendance: 22,983; Referee: Ľuboš Micheľ (Slovakia)

31 October 2001 6	Olympiacos (Greece)	1 – 1	(Spain) Deportivo La Coruña	Athens, Greece
20:45	Alexandris 51'	Report	84' Capdevila	Stadium: Olympic Stadium; Attendance: 20,293; Referee: Markus Merk (Germany)

==== Second group stage ====
Pos	Team	Pld	W	D	L	GF	GA	GD	Pts	Qualification
1	(Germany) Bayer Leverkusen	6	3	1	2	11	11	0	10	Advance to knockout stage
2	(Spain) Deportivo La Coruña	6	3	1	2	7	6	+1	10	Advance to knockout stage
3	(England) Arsenal	6	2	1	3	8	8	0	7	
4	(Italy) Juventus	6	2	1	3	7	8	−1	7	

Source: RSSSF

21 November 2001 1	Deportivo La Coruña (Spain)	2 – 0	(England) Arsenal	A Coruña, Spain
20:45	Makaay 9'; Tristán 25'	Report		Stadium: Estadio Riazor; Attendance: 25,864; Referee: Terje Hauge (Norway)

4 December 2001 2	Bayer Leverkusen (Germany)	3 – 0	(Spain) Deportivo La Coruña	Leverkusen, Germany
20:45	Zé Roberto 64'; Neuville 67'; Ballack 79'	Report		Stadium: BayArena; Attendance: 22,500; Referee: Kyros Vassaras (Greece)

19 February 2002 3	Juventus (Italy)	0 – 0	(Spain) Deportivo La Coruña	Turin, Italy
20:45		Report		Stadium: Stadio delle Alpi; Attendance: 9,836; Referee: Hugh Dallas (Scotland)

27 February 2002 4	Deportivo La Coruña (Spain)	2 – 0	(Italy) Juventus	A Coruña, Spain
20:45	Tristán 8'; Djalminha 77'	Report		Stadium: Estadio Riazor; Attendance: 24,885; Referee: Anders Frisk (Sweden)

12 March 2002 5	Arsenal (England)	0 – 2	(Spain) Deportivo La Coruña	London, England
20:45		Report	30' Valerón; 40' Naybet	Stadium: Arsenal Stadium; Attendance: 35,392; Referee: Urs Meier (Switzerland)

20 March 2002 6	Deportivo La Coruña (Spain)	1 – 3	(Germany) Bayer Leverkusen	A Coruña, Spain
20:45	Tristán 75'	Report	34' Ballack; 54' Schneider; 86' Neuville	Stadium: Estadio Riazor; Attendance: 23,532; Referee: Valentin Ivanov (Russia)

==== Knockout stage ====
2 April 2002 Quarter-finals; First leg	Deportivo La Coruña (Spain)	0 – 2	(England) Manchester United	A Coruña, Spain
20:45		Report	15' Beckham; 41' van Nistelrooy	Stadium: Estadio Riazor; Attendance: 35,400; Referee: Kyros Vassaras (Greece)

10 April 2002 Quarter-finals; Second leg	Manchester United (England)	3 – 2 (5–2 agg.)	(Spain) Deportivo La Coruña	Manchester, England
21:45	Solskjær 23', 56'; Giggs 69'	Report	45' (o.g.) Blanc; 90+1' Djalminha	Stadium: Old Trafford; Attendance: 66,500; Referee: Markus Merk (Germany)

=== FIFA Club World Championship ===
As winners of the 1999–2000 La Liga, Deportivo La Coruña was one of the 12 teams that were invited to the 2001 FIFA Club World Championship, which would be hosted in Spain from 28 July to 12 August 2001. However, the tournament was cancelled, primarily due to the collapse of ISL, which was marketing partner of FIFA at the time.

28 July 2001 1	Boca Juniors (Argentina)	Cancelled	(Spain) Deportivo La Coruña	A Coruña, Spain
				Stadium: Riazor

1 August 2001 2	Deportivo La Coruña (Spain)	Cancelled	(Australia) Wollongong Wolves	A Coruña, Spain
				Stadium: Riazor

4 August 2001 3	Deportivo La Coruña (Spain)	Cancelled	(Egypt) Zamalek	A Coruña, Spain
				Stadium: Riazor
