= 1999–2000 Deportivo de La Coruña season =

Deportivo de La Coruña
1999–2000 season
- President: Augusto César Lendoiro
- Manager: Javier Irureta
- Stadium: Estadio Riazor
- La Liga: 1st
- UEFA Cup: Fourth round
- Copa del Rey: Round of 16
- Top goalscorer: League: Roy Makaay (22); All: Roy Makaay (26)
Home colours	Away colours	Third colours

The 1999–2000 season was Deportivo de La Coruña's 71st in existence, and 30th in La Liga.

== Season review ==
Deportivo won their first ever Spanish league title with 69 points, five points ahead of Barcelona and Valencia, even after losing eleven matches.

In the UEFA Cup, Deportivo were eliminated in the quarterfinals by Arsenal, and in the Copa del Rey in the round of 16 by Osasuna.

Deportivo began the season well, leading the league table by the 12th matchday and only losing three league matches by the midway point of the season in December, but lost form by the new year, only winning two of the following seven matches. However they regained form, winning seven of the next ten matches, and although Deportivo only won once out of the last four matches, they won on the last matchday against Espanyol to secure the league title, as Barcelona had dropped points by drawing their last two matches.

== Squad ==
Squad at end of season

Note: Flags indicate national team as defined under FIFA eligibility rules; some limited exceptions apply. Players may hold more than one non-FIFA nationality.

No.	Pos.	Nation	Player
1	GK	CMR	Jacques Songo'o
2	DF	ESP	Manuel Pablo
3	DF	ESP	Enrique Romero
4	DF	MAR	Noureddine Naybet
5	DF	ARG	Gabriel Schürrer
6	MF	BRA	Mauro Silva
7	FW	NED	Roy Makaay
8	MF	BRA	Djalminha
9	FW	POR	Pauleta
10	MF	ESP	Fran
11	FW	ARG	Turu Flores
12	MF	ARG	Lionel Scaloni
13	GK	CZE	Petr Kouba

No.	Pos.	Nation	Player
14	DF	ESP	César
15	FW	ESP	Iván Pérez
16	MF	BRA	Flávio Conceição
17	MF	ESP	Manel
18	MF	ESP	Víctor
19	DF	ESP	Luis Ramis
20	MF	BRA	Donato
21	MF	ESP	Jaime
23	FW	MAR	Salaheddine Bassir
24	MF	YUG	Slaviša Jokanović
25	MF	ESP	Fernando
26	GK	ESP	Dani Mallo
28	DF	POR	Hugo Carreira

== Transfers ==
=== Summer ===
In: Note: Flags indicate national team as defined under FIFA eligibility rules; some limited exceptions apply. Players may hold more than one non-FIFA nationality.

No.	Pos.	Nation	Player
7	FW	NED	Roy Makaay (from (Spain) Tenerife)
13	GK	CZE	Petr Kouba (from (Czech Republic) Viktoria Žižkov)
15	FW	ESP	Iván Pérez (from (France) Bordeaux)
18	MF	ESP	Víctor (from (Spain) Racing Santander)
21	MF	ESP	Jaime (from (Spain) Real Madrid)
24	MF	YUG	Slaviša Jokanović (from (Spain) Tenerife)
25	MF	ESP	Fernando (from (Spain) Real Betis)

Out: Note: Flags indicate national team as defined under FIFA eligibility rules; some limited exceptions apply. Players may hold more than one non-FIFA nationality.

No.	Pos.	Nation	Player
2	DF	ESP	Armando Álvarez (to Mallorca)
7	DF	ESP	Javier Manjarín (to Racing Santander)
15	MF	MAR	Mustapha Hadji (to Coventry City)
18	MF	FRA	Stéphane Ziani (to Bordeaux)
21	DF	FRA	Jérôme Bonnissel (to Bordeaux)
22	DF	POR	Hélder Cristóvão (to Newcastle United)
13	GK	POR	Nuno Espírito Santo (to Mérida)
9	FW	RUS	Dmitri Radchenko (to Júbilo Iwata)
25	GK	NGA	Peter Rufai (to Gil Vicente)
26	MF	SUI	Gerardo Seoane (to Bellinzona)
27	DF	ESP	José Manuel Aira (to Tenerife)
23	MF	ESP	José Ramón González (to)
24	DF	ESP	Javi López (to Tenerife)
29	FW	URU	Sebastian Abreu (to Tecos UAG)

=== Winter ===
In: Note: Flags indicate national team as defined under FIFA eligibility rules; some limited exceptions apply. Players may hold more than one non-FIFA nationality.

No.	Pos.	Nation	Player

Out: Note: Flags indicate national team as defined under FIFA eligibility rules; some limited exceptions apply. Players may hold more than one non-FIFA nationality.

No.	Pos.	Nation	Player
22	MF	ESP	José Manuel (loan to (Spain) Compostela)

== Competitions ==
=== La Liga ===
Pos	Team	Pld	W	D	L	GF	GA	GD	Pts	Qualification or relegation
1	Deportivo La Coruña (C)	38	21	6	11	66	44	+22	69	Qualification for the Club World Cup and Champions League group stage
2	Barcelona	38	19	7	12	70	46	+24	64 (Note: VAL 3–1 BAR; BAR 3–0 VAL)	Qualification for the Champions League group stage
3	Valencia	38	18	10	10	59	39	+20	64	Qualification for the Champions League third qualifying round
4	Zaragoza	38	16	15	7	60	40	+20	63	Qualification for the UEFA Cup first round (Note: Real Madrid qualified directly for the 2000–01 UEFA Champions League as holders. As a result, Zaragoza lost their spot in the UEFA Champions League and had to participate in the UEFA Cup.)
5	Real Madrid	38	16	14	8	58	48	+10	62	Qualification for the Champions League group stage

Source: LFP
Rules for classification: 1) points; 2) head-to-head points; 3) head-to-head goal difference; 4) head-to-head goals scored; 5) goal difference; 6) number of goals scored.
(C) Champions

==== Results by round ====
Round	1	2	3	4	5	6	7	8	9	10	11	12	13	14	15	16	17	18	19	20	21	22	23	24	25	26	27	28	29	30	31	32	33	34	35	36	37	38
Ground	H	A	H	A	H	A	A	H	A	H	A	H	A	H	A	H	A	H	A	A	H	A	H	A	H	H	A	H	A	H	A	H	A	H	A	H	A	H
Result	W	D	W	D	L	W	D	W	L	W	W	W	W	W	W	W	L	L	D	L	W	L	W	L	W	W	L	W	L	W	W	W	L	W	L	D	D	W
Position	1	5	3	4	7	6	4	3	5	4	3	1	1	1	1	1	1	1	1	1	1	1	1	1	1	1	1	1	1	1	1	1	1	1	1	1	1	1

Source: https://www.worldfootball.net/competition/ro11027/md38/results-and-standings/
A = Away; H = Home; W = Win; D = Draw; L = Loss; = Leader, 2000–01 UEFA Champions League group stage; = 2000–01 UEFA Champions League group stage; = 2000–01 UEFA Champions League qualifying round; = 2000–01 UEFA Cup; = 2000–01 Segunda División

==== Matches ====
22 August 1999 1	Deportivo	4–1	Alavés	La Coruña
		Report		Stadium: Riazor

29 August 1999 2	Real Betis	0–0	Deportivo	Sevilla
		Report		Stadium: Benito Villamarin

11 September 1999 3	Deportivo	2–0	Real Valladolid	La Coruña
		Report		Stadium: Riazor

18 September 1999 4	Real Madrid	1–1	Deportivo	Madrid
CET (UTC+1)	Raúl 82'	Report	Djalminha 47'	Stadium: Santiago Bernabéu

26 September 1999 5	Deportivo	0–2	Numancia	La Coruña
		Report		Stadium: Riazor

3 October 1999 6	Athletic Bilbao	2–3	Deportivo	Bilbao
		Report		Stadium: San Mamés

12 October 1999 7	Mallorca	2–2	Deportivo	Palma de Mallorca
		Report		Stadium: Son Moix

16 October 1999 8	Deportivo	4–1	Málaga	La Coruña
		Report		Stadium: Riazor

23 October 1999 9	Valencia	2–0	Deportivo	Valencia
		Report		Stadium: Mestalla

30 October 1999 10	Deportivo	2–1	Barcelona	La Coruña
		Report		Stadium: Riazor

7 November 1999 11	Real Oviedo	0–1	Deportivo	Oviedo
		Report		Stadium: Carlos Tartiere

21 November 1999 12	Deportivo	5–2	Sevilla	La Coruña
		Report		Stadium: Riazor

28 November 1999 13	Atlético Madrid	1–3	Deportivo	Madrid
				Stadium: Vicente Calderón

5 December 1999 14	Deportivo	3–2	Rayo Vallecano	La Coruña
		Report		Stadium: Riazor

12 December 1999 15	Real Sociedad	1–1	Deportivo	San Sebastián
		Report		Stadium: Anoeta

18 December 1999 16	Deportivo	1–0	Celta Vigo	A Coruña
CET (UTC+1)	Flores 65'	Report		Stadium: Estadio Riazor

22 December 1999 17	Real Zaragoza	2–1	Deportivo	Zaragoza
		Report		Stadium: La Romareda

5 January 2000 18	Deportivo	0–3	Racing Santander	La Coruña
		Report		Stadium: Riazor

8 January 2000 19	Espanyol	0–0	Deportivo	Barcelona
		Report		Stadium: Olímpic Lluís Companys

16 January 2000 20	Alavés	2–1	Deportivo	Vitoria
		Report		Stadium: Mendizorroza

22 January 2000 21	Deportivo	2–0	Real Betis	La Coruña
		Report		Stadium: Riazor

30 January 2000 22	Real Valladolid	4–1	Deportivo	Valladolid
		Report		Stadium: José Zorrilla

6 February 2000 23	Deportivo	5–2	Real Madrid	A Coruña
CET (UTC+1)	Makaay 7'; Djalminha 18'; Víctor 48'; Flores 74', 84'	Report	Morientes 36'; Hierro 89'	Stadium: Estadio Riazor

13 February 2000 24	Numancia	1–0	Deportivo	Soria
		Report		Stadium: Los Pajaritos

19 February 2000 25	Deportivo	2–0	Athletic Bilbao	La Coruña
		Report		Stadium: Riazor

27 February 2000 26	Deportivo	2–1	Mallorca	La Coruña
		Report		Stadium: Riazor

5 March 2000 27	Málaga	1–0	Deportivo	Málaga
		Report		Stadium: La Rosaleda

12 March 2000 28	Deportivo	2–0	Valencia	La Coruña
		Report		Stadium: Riazor

18 March 2000 29	Barcelona	2–1	Deportivo	Barcelona
		Report		Stadium: Camp Nou

26 March 2000 30	Deportivo	3–1	Real Oviedo	La Coruña
		Report		Stadium: Riazor

2 April 2000 31	Sevilla	1–3	Deportivo	Sevilla
		Report		Stadium: Sánchez Pizjuán

8 April 2000 32	Deportivo	4–1	Atlético Madrid	La Coruña
		Report		Stadium: Riazor

16 April 2000 33	Rayo Vallecano	2–0	Deportivo	Madrid
		Report		Stadium: Vallecas

23 April 2000 34	Deportivo	2–0	Real Sociedad	La Coruña
		Report		Stadium: Riazor

30 April 2000 35	Celta Vigo	2–1	Deportivo	Vigo
CET (UTC+1)	McCarthy 4'; G. López 75'	Report	Flores 46'	Stadium: Balaídos

7 May 2000 36	Deportivo	2–2	Real Zaragoza	La Coruña
		Report		Stadium: Riazor

14 May 2000 37	Racing Santander	0–0	Deportivo	Santander
		Report		Stadium: El Sardinero

19 May 2000 38	Deportivo	2–0	Espanyol	La Coruña
		Report		Stadium: Riazor

=== UEFA Cup ===
==== First Round ====
14 September 1999 First Round 1st leg	Stabæk (Norway)	1 – 0	(Spain) Deportivo La Coruña	Oslo, Norway
18:00 CEST (UTC+2)	Flem (yellow card) 39'; Finstad 57'; Stenersen (yellow card) 59'; Holter (yellow card) 64'	Report	Djalminha (yellow card) 31'; Jokanović (yellow card) 54'	Stadium: Ullevaal Stadion; Referee: Romāns Lajuks (Latvia)

30 September 1999 First Round 2nd leg	Deportivo La Coruña (Spain)	2 – 0 (2 – 1 agg.)	(Norway) Stabæk	A Coruña, Spain
21:30 CEST (UTC+2)	Jokanović 37'; Conceição 63'; Djalminha (yellow card) 75'	Report	Stenersen (yellow card) 21'; Linderoth (yellow card) 49'; Flem (yellow card) (yellow-red card) 78'; Stenvoll (yellow card) 79'	Stadium: Estadio Riazor; Referee: Kenny Clark (Scotland)

==== Second Round ====
19 October 1999 Second Round 1st leg	Deportivo La Coruña (Spain)	3 – 1	(France) Montpellier	A Coruña, Spain
18:00 CEST (UTC+2)	Pauleta 17'; Djalminha 51' (pen.); Makaay 53'; Silva (yellow card) 82'	Report	Delaye 6' (yellow card) 20'; Silvestre (yellow card) 50' dos Santos (yellow card) 90'	Stadium: Estadio Riazor; Referee: Kyros Vassaras (Greece)

4 November 1999 Second Round 2nd leg	Montpellier (France)	0 – 2 (1 – 5 agg.)	(Spain) Deportivo La Coruña	Montpellier, France
18:00 CET (UTC+1)	Rodriguez (yellow card) 2'; Gourvennec (yellow card) 29'	Report	Naybet (yellow card) 38'; Jokanović (yellow card) 43'; Makaay 45'; Pablo (yellow card) 79'; Pauleta 82'	Stadium: La Mosson; Referee: Herbert Fandel (Germany)

==== Third Round ====
25 November 1999 Third Round 1st leg	Deportivo La Coruña (Spain)	4 – 2	(Greece) Panathinaikos	A Coruña, Spain
CET (UTC+1)	Olivares 7' (o.g.); Pauleta 11'; Djalminha 13'; Donato 30' (yellow card) 56'	Report	Goumas (yellow card) 7'; Warzycha 29'; Galetto 66'; Mykland (yellow card) 78'	Stadium: Estadio Riazor; Referee: Terje Hauge (Norway)

9 December 1999 Third Round 2nd leg	Panathinaikos (Greece)	1 – 1 (3 – 5 agg.)	(Spain) Deportivo La Coruña	Athens, Greece
19:30 CET (UTC+1)	Olivares (yellow card) 7'; Asanović 78' (pen.); Karagounis (yellow card) 79'	Report	Conceição (yellow card) 22'; Silva (yellow card) 30'; Songo'o (yellow card) 64'; Pablo (yellow card) 82'; Víctor (yellow card) 87'; Makaay 90'	Stadium: Olympic Stadium; Referee: Alain Sars (France)

==== Quarter-finals ====
2 March 2000 1	Arsenal (England)	5 – 1	(Spain) Deportivo La Coruña	London, England
21:00 CET (UTC+1)	Dixon 5'; Henry 30', 67'; Keown (yellow card) 51'; Ljungberg (yellow card) 55'; Grimandi (yellow card) 60'; Kanu 78'; Bergkamp 83'	Report	Conceição (yellow card) 17'; Djalminha 55' (yellow card) 57' (yellow-red card) 60'; Fernando (yellow card) 90'	Stadium: Highbury; Referee: Atanas Uzunov (Bulgaria)

9 March 2000 2	Deportivo La Coruña (Spain)	2 – 1 (3 – 6 agg.)	(England) Arsenal	A Coruña, Spain
21:00 CET (UTC+1)	Víctor 68'; Pérez 90'	Report	Henry 63' (yellow card) 74'; Dixon (yellow card) 86'	Stadium: Estadio Riazor; Referee: Oğuz Sarvan (Turkey)

== Statistics ==
=== Player statistics ===
No.	Pos	Nat	Player	Total		La Liga		Copa del Rey		UEFA Cup	
No.	Pos	Nat	Player	Apps	Goals	Apps	Goals	Apps	Goals	Apps	Goals
1	GK	(Cameroon) CMR	Songo'o	44	-52	36	-40	1	-2	7	-10
2	DF	(Spain) ESP	Manuel Pablo	45	0	33+4	0	2	0	6	0
4	DF	(Morocco) MAR	Naybet	34	0	25	0	1	0	8	0
20	DF	(Brazil) BRA	Donato	38	4	27+2	3	2+2	0	5	1
3	DF	(Spain) ESP	Romero	44	1	32+2	1	3	0	7	0
18	MF	(Spain) ESP	Víctor	47	6	34+3	4	2+1	1	5+2	1
6	MF	(Brazil) BRA	Mauro Silva	43	0	33	0	1+1	0	8	0
24	MF	(Federal Republic of Yugoslavia) YUG	Jokanović	31	3	20+3	2	3	0	5	1
16	MF	(Brazil) BRA	Conceição	34	5	25+2	4	2	0	3+2	1
8	AM	(Brazil) BRA	Djalminha	39	13	29+2	10	0+1	0	7	3
7	FW	(Netherlands) NED	Makaay	46	26	34+2	22	0+2	1	8	3
13	GK	(Czech Republic) CZE	Kouba	6	-6	2	-3	3	-2	1	-1
5	DF	(Argentina) ARG	Schürrer	22	0	18+1	0	3	0	0	0
10	MF	(Spain) ESP	Fran	28	1	16+6	1	2+1	0	0+3	0
11	FW	(Argentina) ARG	Turu Flores	42	8	15+19	8	2+1	0	3+2	0
9	FW	(Portugal) POR	Pauleta	40	11	12+18	8	2+1	0	4+3	3
14	DF	(Spain) ESP	César	13	1	10+1	1	2	0		
21	MF	(Spain) ESP	Jaime	28	0	7+14	0	3+1	0	1+2	0
12	MF	(Argentina) ARG	Scaloni	24	0	4+14	0	1	0	2+3	0
25	MF	(Spain) ESP	Fernando	29	0	3+16	0	3	0	4+3	0
19	DF	(Spain) ESP	Ramis	6	0	2+1	0	2	0	1	0
17	MF	(Spain) ESP	Manel	11	0	1+5	0	2+1	0	1+1	0
15	FW	(Spain) ESP	Pérez	8	1	0+3	0	3	0	0+2	1
26	GK	(Spain) ESP	Dani Mallo	0	0	0	0				
22	MF	(Spain) ESP	José Manuel	1	0	0	0	1	0		
23	FW	(Morocco) MAR	Bassir	1	0	0	0	0	0	0+1	0
28	DF	(Portugal) POR	Carreira	0	0	0	0				

- Source: https://www.bdfutbol.com/en/t/t1999-0013.html

=== Goal scorers ===
Place	Position	Nation	Number	Name	La Liga	Copa del Rey	UEFA Cup	Total
1	FW	(Netherlands)	7	Roy Makaay	22	1	3	26
2	MF	(Brazil)	8	Djalminha	10	0	3	13
3	FW	(Portugal)	9	Pauleta	8	0	3	11
4	FW	(Argentina)	11	Turu Flores	8	0	0	8
5	MF	(Spain)	18	Víctor	4	1	1	6
6	MF	(Brazil)	16	Flávio Conceição	4	0	1	5
7	MF	(Spain)	20	Donato	3	0	1	4
8	MF	(Federal Republic of Yugoslavia)	24	Slaviša Jokanović	2	0	1	3
9	FW	(Spain)	15	Iván Pérez	0	0	1	1
10	DF	(Spain)	14	César	1	0	0	1
11	MF	(Spain)	10	Fran	1	0	0	1
12	DF	(Spain)	3	Enrique Romero	1	0	0	1
				Own goal	0	0	1	1
				TOTALS	64	2	15	81
