= Juan Carlos Valerón =

Spanish footballer (born 1975)

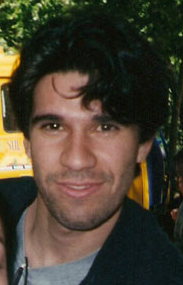
- Valerón in the 2000s

Personal information
- Full name: Juan Carlos Valerón Santana
- Date of birth: 17 June 1975 (age 51)
- Place of birth: Arguineguín, Spain
- Height: 1.80 m (5 ft 11 in)
- Position: Attacking midfielder

Youth career
- 1987–1990: Arguineguín
- 1990–1994: Las Palmas

Senior career*
Years	Team	Apps	(Gls)
1994–1995	Las Palmas B	25	(7)
1995–1997	Las Palmas	54	(5)
1997–1998	Mallorca	36	(3)
1998–2000	Atlético Madrid	65	(7)
2000–2013	Deportivo La Coruña	328	(24)
2013–2016	Las Palmas	82	(3)
Total		590	(49)

International career
1997–1998	Spain U21	4	(0)
1997	Spain U23	4	(0)
1998–2005	Spain	46	(5)

Managerial career
- 2016–2019: Las Palmas (youth)
- 2017: Las Palmas (assistant)
- 2018: Las Palmas B (assistant)
- 2019: Las Palmas B (assistant)
- 2020–2021: Deportivo B
Medal record
Men's football
Representing Spain
UEFA European Under-21 Championship
Winner	1998 Romania
- * Club domestic league appearances and goals

Juan Carlos Valerón Santana (born 17 June 1975) is a Spanish former professional footballer who played as an attacking midfielder.

Over 15 seasons, he amassed La Liga totals of 390 matches and 29 goals with Mallorca, Atlético Madrid and Deportivo, spending 13 years with the latter club. He started and finished his 22-year senior career with Las Palmas.

Valerón represented Spain in the 2002 World Cup and two European Championships, earning 46 caps.

== Club career ==
=== Early years ===
Born in Arguineguín, Gran Canaria, Valerón started playing with hometown's Las Palmas, but switched to the Balearic Islands in the 1997–98 season, representing Mallorca and making his La Liga debut on 31 August 1997 by playing ten minutes in a 2–1 home win over Valencia.

He was an instrumental figure in the club's qualification for the UEFA Cup Winners' Cup, with the team also finishing fifth in the league and reaching the final of the Copa del Rey, lost to eventual champions Barcelona in a penalty shoot-out.

=== Atlético and Deportivo ===
In the next two years, Valerón played for Atlético Madrid where he was an undisputed starter but, following the side's relegation in 2000, he joined Deportivo de La Coruña, sharing club and position with equally talented Brazilian Djalminha. He gradually would become first choice, signing a contract to eventually see off the remainder of his career with the Galicians in February 2004.

In January 2006, however, Valerón started a bad run with injuries. He suffered a knee injury which relapsed in July and early 2007 (with him only managing two league appearances in the process), leading to another surgery. Consequently, he did not reappear until midway through the 2007–08 campaign.

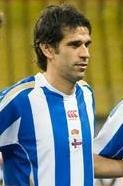
Valerón with Deportivo in 2008

On 27 January 2008, Valerón returned to the bench in Deportivo's 3–1 home win against Real Valladolid, coming on as a substitute for Andrés Guardado for the final 15 minutes – his first match for over a year. In 2008–09, aged 33, he eventually became an important first-team fixture again, both on domestic and European fronts.

The 36-year-old Valerón was an undisputed starter for Depor in the 2011–12 season, scoring a career-best five goals in nearly 3,000 minutes of action in Segunda División as his team returned to the top flight after one year out, as champions. Even though he had a contract until 2015, he chose to leave in June 2013, having taken part in 422 games in all competitions (32 goals).

=== Return to Las Palmas ===
On 14 July 2013, following another Deportivo relegation, Valerón returned to his first club Las Palmas after 16 years, signing a one-year contract with an option for a second. He continued to be an important first-team member during his tenure, achieving promotion to the top flight in 2015.

In summer 2015, Valerón renewed his contract with the Amarillos for a further year. On 26 September, he first appeared with the club in the top flight, featuring 22 minutes in a 1–2 away loss to Barcelona in what was his first game in the competition in 847 days, and becoming the fifth oldest player to play there at the age of 40 years and 101 days; he climbed one position on 12 December after coming on as substitute against Real Betis, surpassing former Deportivo teammate Donato.

On 1 March 2016, after being featured in a 4–0 home win against Getafe, Valerón appeared in his 400th game in the Spanish top tier. On 7 May, he announced his retirement.

== International career ==
A Spain international since 18 November 1998 in a 2–2 friendly draw with Italy in Salerno, Valerón appeared with the national side at UEFA Euro 2000, the 2002 FIFA World Cup (where he scored in a 3–1 win against Slovenia) and Euro 2004, netting immediately after coming from the bench in a 1–0 victory over Russia in the latter competition.

He made his last appearance for his country on 26 March 2005, a 3–0 defeat of China. In late July 2019, he was hired by the Canarian Football Federation to be responsible for the several teams in the region that took part in the corresponding competitions.

== Coaching career ==
Shortly after retiring, Valerón began working as a manager after completing the UEFA B course. He was appointed youth coach at Las Palmas and, ahead of the 2017–18 season, was named assistant to Manolo Márquez in the first team; the latter left his position three months later, however, and the former returned to the academy.

On 24 January 2018, Valerón agreed to join Juan Manuel Rodríguez's staff at Las Palmas B, the reserve team. He resigned from his post in June for personal reasons, but the following January resumed his work with the youth sides.

Valerón returned to his former club Deportivo in June 2020, being appointed manager of the reserves in the Tercera División.

== Player profile ==
=== Style of play ===
Valerón was known for his passing skills and ball control while also having the ability to score goals. However, he was also injury-prone and inconsistent.

=== Reception ===
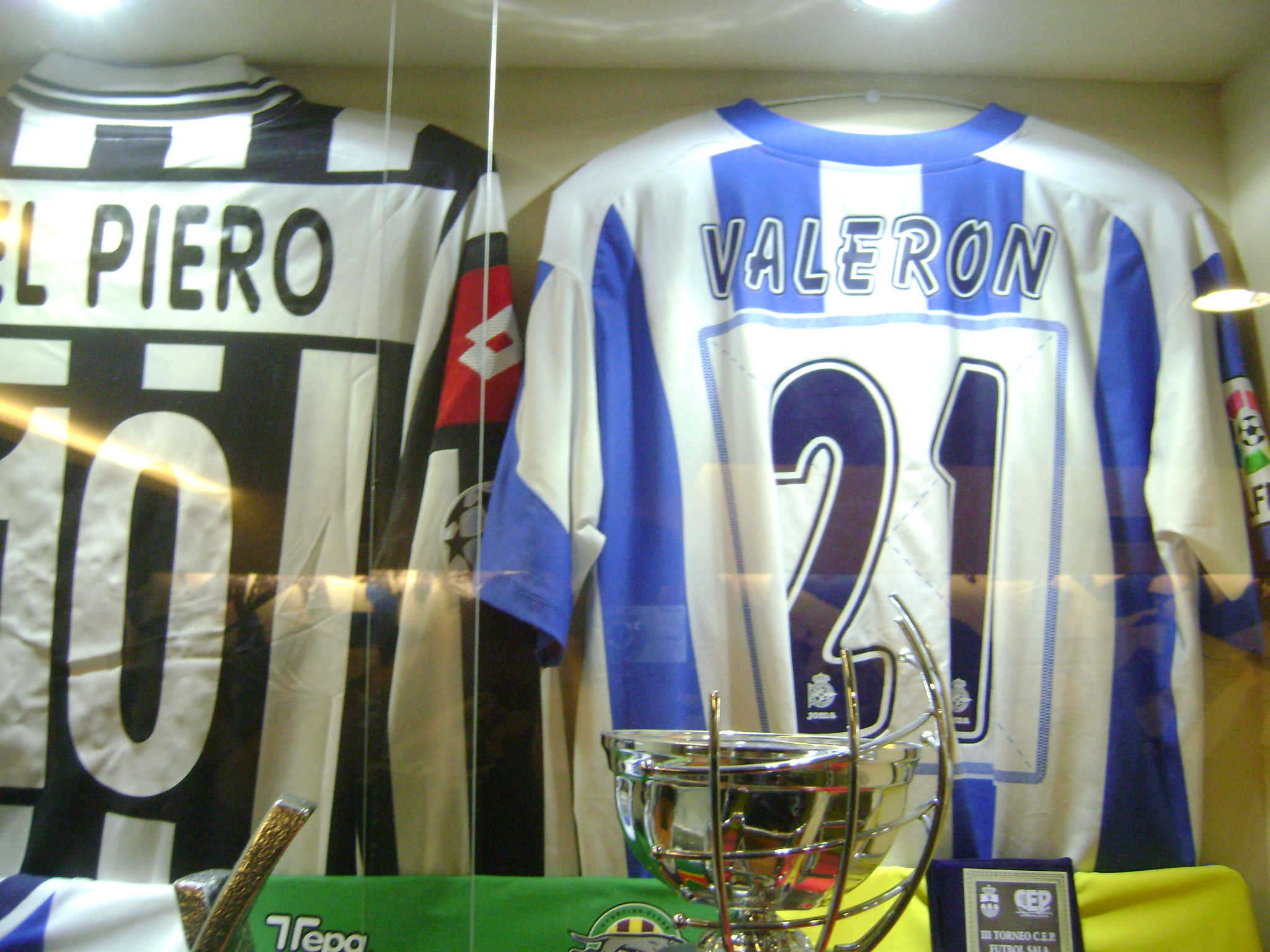
A shirt worn by Valerón for Deportivo.

Valerón was widely regarded as one of the most respected players in Spain, and as an important figure for Deportivo. Andrés Iniesta said he would pay to watch him play, whilst manager Juan Antonio Anquela called him a reference for Spanish football and fellow coach Vicente del Bosque admitted that he would always fit in the national team. His Las Palmas teammate, Javi Castellano, praised him for his honesty and modesty.

Miguel Ángel Ramírez, Las Palmas president, said in 2015 he was trying to persuade Valerón to play another season so that he would be able to say goodbye to all the stadia in Spain where he was consistently cheered– this was exemplified by his last game at the Camp Nou, with former national teammate Luis Enrique and coach of the opposing team applauding as he took the pitch. Former Dutch internationals Jimmy Floyd Hasselbaink and Roy Makaay claimed he was the best player they had ever played with.

Ahead of his return to the Estadio Riazor in April 2016, Deportivo manager Víctor Sánchez said that Valerón would have won the Ballon d'Or had he played for a more fashionable club.

== Personal life ==
Valerón's older brother, Miguel Ángel, was also a footballer and a midfielder; having represented Las Palmas and Mallorca B, his career was also curtailed by injuries. Later, together with another sibling, Pedro, they created a football club/school named Abrisajac, from biblical characters Abraham, Isaac and Jacob, and Juan Carlos still played there one year before retiring for good.

Valerón was a close friend of fellow Canarian Manuel Pablo, who also played for Las Palmas, Deportivo and Spain. He was also known for his devotion to God, but admitted that he and his family did not follow any religion.

Valerón's nephew, Manu, also played youth football for Las Palmas.

== Career statistics ==
=== Club ===
Appearances and goals by club, season and competition
Club	Season	League			Cup		Super Cup		Continental		Total	
Club	Season	Division	Apps	Goals	Apps	Goals	Apps	Goals	Apps	Goals	Apps	Goals
Las Palmas B	1994–95	Tercera División	25	7	–		–		–		25	7
Las Palmas	1995–96	Segunda División B	27	0	2	1	–		–		29	1
Las Palmas	1996–97	Segunda División	27	2	7	0	–		–		34	2
Las Palmas	Total		54	2	9	1	—		—		63	3
Mallorca	1997–98	La Liga	36	3	11	1	–		–		47	4
Atlético Madrid	1998–99	La Liga	30	3	5	0	–		5	0	40	3
Atlético Madrid	1999–2000	La Liga	35	4	6	0	–		6	0	47	4
Atlético Madrid	Total		65	7	11	0	—		11	0	87	7
Deportivo	2000–01	La Liga	31	4	2	0	0	0	8	0	41	4
Deportivo	2001–02	La Liga	36	3	4	0	–		13	3	53	6
Deportivo	2002–03	La Liga	23	2	1	0	2	1	5	0	31	3
Deportivo	2003–04	La Liga	34	3	1	0	–		14	2	49	5
Deportivo	2004–05	La Liga	38	1	1	0	–		8	0	47	1
Deportivo	2005–06	La Liga	20	4	3	1	–		6	0	29	5
Deportivo	2006–07	La Liga	2	0	1	0	–		–		3	0
Deportivo	2007–08	La Liga	5	0	0	0	–		–		5	0
Deportivo	2008–09	La Liga	22	0	3	0	–		12	1	37	1
Deportivo	2009–10	La Liga	24	1	3	0	–		–		27	1
Deportivo	2010–11	La Liga	21	0	5	0	–		–		26	0
Deportivo	2011–12	Segunda División	39	5	1	0	–		–		40	5
Deportivo	2012–13	La Liga	33	1	1	0	–		–		34	1
Deportivo	Total		328	24	26	1	2	1	66	6	422	32
Las Palmas	2013–14	Segunda División	45	3	1	0	–		–		46	3
Las Palmas	2014–15	Segunda División	24	0	3	0	–		–		27	0
Las Palmas	2015–16	La Liga	13	0	5	0	–		–		18	0
Las Palmas	Total		82	3	9	0	—		—		91	3
Career total			577	46	61	3	2	1	77	6	717	56

=== International ===
Appearances and goals by national team and year
National team	Year	Apps	Goals
Spain	1998	1	0
Spain	1999	6	0
Spain	2000	7	0
Spain	2001	4	0
Spain	2002	9	2
Spain	2003	10	1
Spain	2004	8	2
Spain	2005	1	0
Total		46	5

Scores and results list Spain's goal tally first, score column indicates score after each Valerón goal.

List of international goals scored by Juan Carlos Valerón
No.	Date	Venue	Opponent	Score	Result	Competition
1	2 June 2002	Gwangju World Cup Stadium, Gwangju, South Korea	Slovenia	2–0	3–1	2002 FIFA World Cup
2	7 September 2002	Leoforos Alexandras Stadium, Athens, Greece	Greece	2–0	2–0	UEFA Euro 2004 qualifying
3	11 October 2003	Republican Stadium, Yerevan, Armenia	Armenia	1–0	4–0	UEFA Euro 2004 qualifying
4	5 June 2004	Coliseum Alfonso Pérez, Getafe, Spain	Andorra	4–0	4–0	Friendly
5	12 June 2004	Estádio Algarve, Faro, Portugal	Russia	1–0	1–0	UEFA Euro 2004

== Honours ==
Deportivo

- Copa del Rey: 2001–02
- Supercopa de España: 2002
- UEFA Intertoto Cup: 2008
- Segunda División: 2011–12

Spain U21

- UEFA European Under-21 Championship: 1998

Individual

- LFP Awards Fair Play: 2008–09
- Diario AS Fair Play: 2015

== See also ==
- List of La Liga players (400+ appearances)
