= Goran Đorović =

Serbian footballer and manager

Personal information
- Date of birth: 11 November 1971 (age 54)
- Place of birth: Pristina, SFR Yugoslavia
- Height: 1.83 m (6 ft 0 in)
- Position: Defender

Youth career
- Priština

Senior career*
| Years | Team | Apps | (Gls) |
| 1989–1993 | Priština | 97 | (4) |
| 1993–1997 | Red Star Belgrade | 101 | (2) |
| 1997–2001 | Celta | 100 | (5) |
| 2001–2004 | Deportivo La Coruña | 11 | (0) |
| 2003–2004 | → Elche (loan) | 15 | (0) |
| Total | | 324 | (11) |

International career
| 1994–2001 | FR Yugoslavia | 49 | (0) |

Managerial career
- 2017–2019: Serbia U21
- 2021–2025: Serbia (assistant)
- * Club domestic league appearances and goals

Goran Đorović (Serbian Cyrillic: Горан Ђopoвић; born 11 November 1971) is a Serbian former professional footballer who played mainly a central defender but also as a left-back.

In his country, he played for Priština and Red Star. He spent the rest of his career in Spain after arriving there in 1997, representing Celta, Deportivo and Elche.

Đorović went into coaching upon retiring, serving as the manager of the Serbian national under-21 team.

== Club career ==
Đorović was born in Pristina, Socialist Federal Republic of Yugoslavia. Having initially played for his hometown club FK Priština, he joined Red Star Belgrade in 1993. He went on to appear in exactly 100 league matches and, aged almost 26, moved abroad after signing with Spanish club RC Celta de Vigo.

Soon, interest arose from major teams, such as UC Sampdoria and Arsenal. However, he decided to stay at least for the 1998–99 season at Celta, where he would eventually share teams with his brother Zoran (who had absolutely no impact for the Galicians) and play 126 competitive games, his La Liga debut coming on 31 August 1997 in a 2–1 home win against Real Zaragoza.

Having had one attempt to sign the player previously rebuffed, Deportivo de La Coruña manager Javier Irureta signed Đorović in 2001, having already bought him from Red Star four years earlier. However, the player's career at Depor would be constantly marred by injuries as he earned over €2 million per season, one of the highest in the squad.

For 2003–04, Đorović was loaned alongside Dani Mallo, Roberto Acuña and José Manuel, to Elche CF in the second division. After featuring rarely throughout the campaign he returned to Deportivo, and was immediately released despite still having one year in his contract. He retired shortly after.

== International career ==
Đorović made his debut for the Serbia and Montenegro national team on 23 December 1994, playing the second half of a 0–2 friendly loss in Brazil in Porto Alegre. He won 48 caps more in the next seven years, being part of the setups at the 1998 FIFA World Cup (playing in all the matches and minutes during the tournament, as the nation bowed out in the round-of-16) and UEFA Euro 2000.

== Career statistics ==
Appearances and goals by national team and year
| National team | Year | Apps | Goals |
|---|---|---|---|
| FR Yugoslavia | 1994 | 2 | 0 |
| FR Yugoslavia | 1995 | 6 | 0 |
| FR Yugoslavia | 1996 | 9 | 0 |
| FR Yugoslavia | 1997 | 7 | 0 |
| FR Yugoslavia | 1998 | 10 | 0 |
| FR Yugoslavia | 1999 | 4 | 0 |
| FR Yugoslavia | 2000 | 6 | 0 |
| FR Yugoslavia | 2001 | 5 | 0 |
| Total | | 49 | 0 |

== Managerial statistics ==
As of match played 23 June 2019

Managerial record by team and tenure
| Team | From | To | Record | | | | |
| Team | From | To | P | W | D | L | Win % |
|---|---|---|---|---|---|---|---|
| Serbia U21 | 18 August 2017 | 2019 | 17 | 10 | 2 | 5 | 58.82 |
| Total | | | 17 | 10 | 2 | 5 | 58.82 |
