= Djalminha =

Brazilian footballer (born 1970)

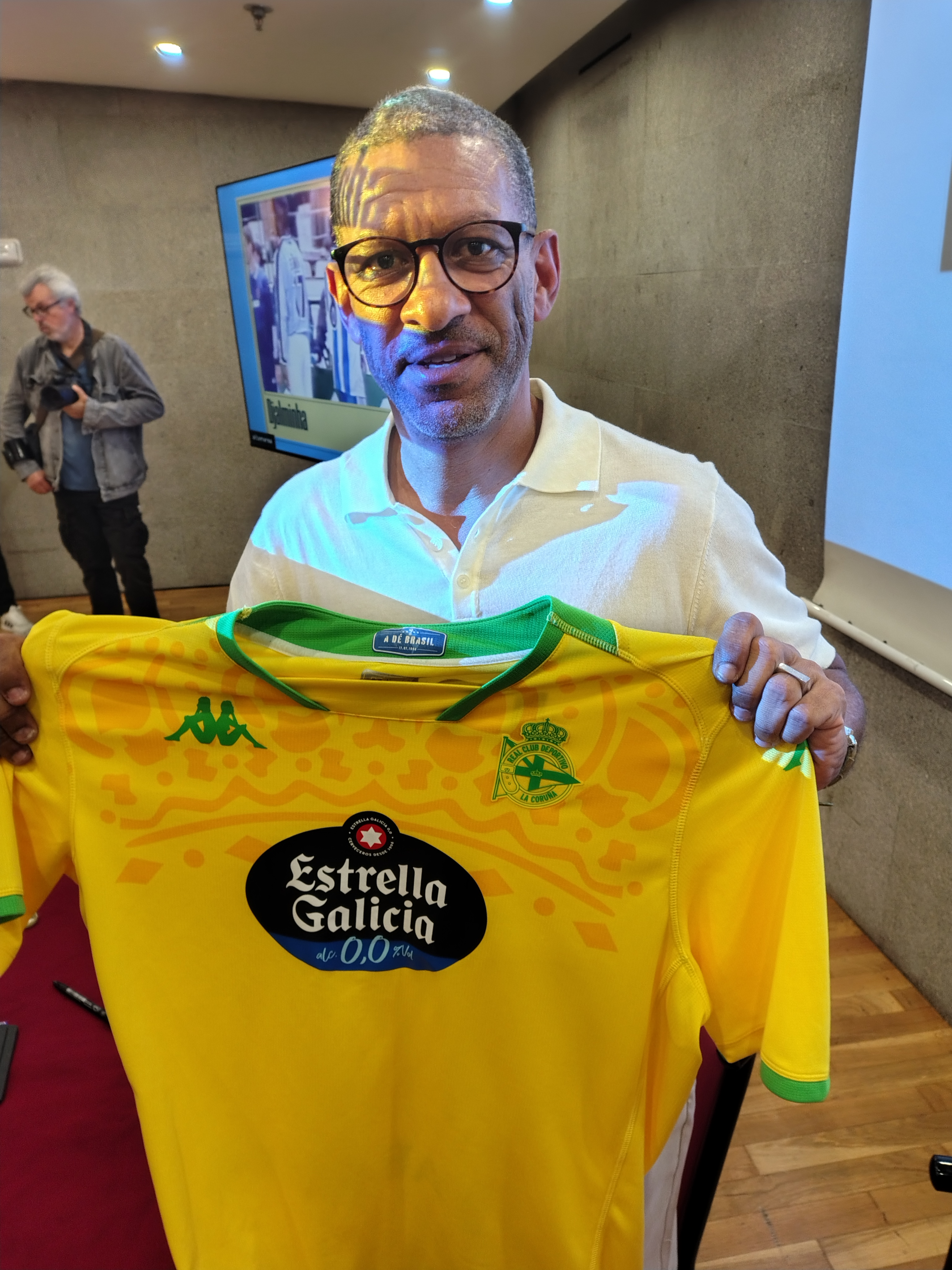

Personal information
- Full name: Djalma Feitosa Dias
- Date of birth: 9 December 1970 (age 55)
- Place of birth: Santos, Brazil
- Height: 1.76 m (5 ft 9 in)
- Position: Attacking midfielder

Youth career
- 1976–1988: Flamengo

Senior career*
Years	Team	Apps	(Gls)
1988–1993	Flamengo	22	(2)
1993–1995	Guarani	33	(15)
1994	→ Shimizu S-Pulse (loan)	11	(4)
1996–1997	Palmeiras	22	(12)
1997–2004	Deportivo La Coruña	137	(38)
2002–2003	→ Austria Wien (loan)	10	(2)
2004	Club América	5	(1)
Total		240	(74)

International career
1996–2002	Brazil	14	(5)
- * Club domestic league appearances and goals

Djalma Feitosa Dias (born 9 December 1970), commonly known as Djalminha ([diʒawˈmĩɲɐ]), is a Brazilian football pundit and former professional player who played as an attacking midfielder. Regarded as a highly gifted and creative playmaker, he was known for his technical ability, close control, vision and flamboyant style of play.

Djalminha represented several clubs in Brazil and Europe, most notably Flamengo, Palmeiras and Deportivo de La Coruña. He was a prominent member of the Deportivo side that won the club's first La Liga title in the 1999–2000 season. At international level, he represented the Brazil national team and was part of the squad that won the 1997 Copa América. Despite his ability, his career was also marked by an unpredictable temperament and a number of disciplinary incidents.

== Club career ==
=== Brazil ===
Son of former footballer Djalma Dias, Djalminha (Little Djalma) was born in Santos, São Paulo, while his father was playing for Santos. He started his career at Flamengo, based in Rio de Janeiro.

Afterwards, Djalminha played for Guarani (being briefly loaned, in 1994, to Shimizu S-Pulse in Japan) and then Palmeiras, where he received the Bola de Ouro (Brazilian Golden Ball) award in 1996.

=== Deportivo de La Coruña ===
In July 1997, Djalminha joined Spanish club Deportivo de La Coruña, where he scored 26 La Liga goals in 87 appearances in his first three seasons there, playing a significant role in the club's first (and, to date, only) La Liga conquest in 1999–2000. After that, however, the emergence of Juan Carlos Valerón, signed upon Atlético Madrid's relegation, meant less playing time for Djalminha. This was followed by a May 2002 heated confrontation during training with Depor manager Javier Irureta, prompted his loan to Austrian Football Bundesliga side FK Austria Wien in the summer of 2002.

After just 11 appearances for Deportivo in the 2003–04 campaign, Djalminha finished his career with Mexico's Club América, retiring at 34.

=== Indoor football ===
In 2008, Djalminha returned to Depor, joining its indoor football team alongside club greats Donato, Fran, Noureddine Naybet and Jacques Songo'o.

== International career ==
The stiff competition in Brazil in Djalminha's position of attacking midfielder, combined with his somewhat difficult temperament, limited him to just 14 full international caps in six years, the vast majority coming while at Deportivo. He was part of the squad that won the 1997 Copa América, and of the Brazil team that played in Le Tournoi, also in 1997.

Djalminha was due to be called to the 2002 FIFA World Cup, but was finally not chosen by Luiz Felipe Scolari after his incident with Irureta days before the announcement of the final squad, losing his place to Kaká.

== Style of play ==
Djalminha was a creative attacking midfielder and playmaker, noted for his technical ability, close control, vision, passing and capacity to improvise in possession. La Liga described him as a midfielder of "enormous technical quality" who was capable of opening up opposing defences with "impossible passes". Palmeiras similarly characterised him as a classic, elegant and skilful midfielder whose precise passing made him the creative force behind much of the club's attack during the 1996 season. Former opponents also highlighted his ability in one-on-one situations, his final ball, late runs into attacking positions, free-kick taking and goalscoring.

An unpredictable and flamboyant player, Djalminha frequently used feints, flicks and improvised skills to evade opponents and create chances. Former teammates described him as an imaginative and technically exceptional player who was given considerable freedom on the pitch. He became particularly associated with the lambreta, a variation of the rainbow flick which he famously performed against four Real Madrid players in 2000.

His former Deportivo teammate Víctor Sánchez described him as a player who demanded possession during difficult matches and attempted to find solutions for the team. Former Brazil teammate Juninho Paulista stated that Djalminha was most effective when surrounded by players who could provide running and defensive cover, allowing him greater freedom to influence the game in possession.

== Career statistics ==
=== Club ===
Appearances and goals by club, season and competition
Club	Season	League			Cup		Continental		Total	
Club	Season	Division	Apps	Goals	Apps	Goals	Apps	Goals	Apps	Goals
Flamengo	1989	Série A	1	0	0	0			1	0
Flamengo	1990	Série A	11	1	7	1			18	2
Flamengo	1991	Série A	4	1					4	1
Flamengo	1992	Série A	7	0					7	0
Flamengo	1993	Série A			6	3			6	3
Flamengo	Total		23	2	13	4			36	6
Guarani	1993	Série A	19	6					19	6
Guarani	1994	Série A	3	3					3	3
Guarani	1995	Série A	11	6					11	6
Guarani	Total		33	15					33	15
Shimizu S-Pulse (loan)	1994	J1 League	11	4	0	0			11	4
Palmeiras	1996	Série A	22	12	7	5			29	17
Palmeiras	1997	Série A	0	0	5	1			5	1
Palmeiras	Total		22	12	12	6			34	18
Deportivo	1997–98	La Liga	26	8	3	1	2	1	31	10
Deportivo	1998–99	La Liga	30	8	5	1			35	9
Deportivo	1999–00	La Liga	31	10	1	0	7	3	39	13
Deportivo	2000–01	La Liga	21	9	3	1	9	3	33	13
Deportivo	2001–02	La Liga	18	1	6	0	8	2	32	3
Deportivo	2003–04	La Liga	11	2	3	0	1	0	15	2
Deportivo	Total		137	38	21	3	27	9	185	50
Austria Wien (loan)	2002–03	Austrian Bundesliga	10	2	0	0	2	1	12	3
Club América	Apertura 2004	Liga MX	5	1					5	1
Career total			241	74	46	13	29	10	316	97

=== International ===
Appearances and goals by national team and year
National team	Year	Apps	Goals
Brazil	1996	3	1
Brazil	1997	7	3
Brazil	2000	2	0
Brazil	2002	2	1
Total		14	5

Scores and results list Brazil's goal tally first, score column indicates score after each Djalminha goal.

List of international goals scored by Djalminha
No.	Date	Venue	Opponent	Score	Result	Competition	Ref.
1	13 November 1996	Estádio Couto Pereira, Curitiba, Brazil	Cameroon	2–0	2–0	Friendly	
2	30 May 1997	Ullevaal Stadion, Oslo, Norway	Norway	1–2	2–4	Friendly	
3	13 June 1997	Estadio Ramón Tahuichi Aguilera, Santa Cruz, Bolivia	Costa Rica	1–0	5–0	1997 Copa América	
4	26 June 1997	Estadio Ramón Tahuichi Aguilera, Santa Cruz, Bolivia	Peru	7–0	7–0	1997 Copa América	
5	6 February 2002	King Fahd International Stadium, Riyadh, Saudi Arabia	Saudi Arabia	1–0	1–0	Friendly	

== Honours ==
=== Football ===
Flamengo

- Copa do Brasil: 1990
- Campeonato Carioca: 1991
- Campeonato Brasileiro Série A: 1992

Palmeiras

- Campeonato Paulista: 1996
- Copa do Brasil runner-up: 1996

Deportivo

- La Liga: 1999–2000
- Copa del Rey: 2001–02
- Supercopa de España: 2000, 2002

Austria Wien

- Austrian Football Bundesliga: 2002–03

Brazil

- Copa América: 1997

Individual

- Bola de Prata: 1993, 1996
- Bola de Ouro: 1996

=== Indoor football ===
Deportivo

- Spanish League: 2007–08, 2009–10
- Spanish Cup: 2007–08, 2009–10

Flamengo

- Brazilian Championship: 2009

Brazil

- Indoor Football World Cup: 2006

Individual

- Indoor Football World Cup MVP: 2006
- Brazilian Championship Top Scorer: 2009
