= Héctor Berenguel =

Spanish footballer and manager

Personal information
- Full name: Héctor Berenguel del Pino
- Date of birth: 11 October 1974 (age 52)
- Place of birth: Almería, Spain
- Height: 1.82 m (6 ft 0 in)
- Position: Defender

Youth career
- Poli Almería

Senior career*
Years	Team	Apps	(Gls)
1992–1995	Poli Almería	34	(3)
1995–1998	Elche	107	(2)
1998–2001	Sevilla	103	(8)
2001–2006	Deportivo La Coruña	81	(0)
2006–2008	Mallorca	50	(0)
Total		375	(13)

Managerial career
- 2011–2012: Poli Ejido
- 2013–2016: Comarca del Mármol
- 2019–2020: Alcorcón (assistant)
- 2020: Tenerife (assistant)
- 2021–2023: Alcorcón (assistant)
- 2023: San Fernando
- * Club domestic league appearances and goals

Héctor Berenguel del Pino (born 11 October 1974), known simply as Héctor as a player, is a Spanish former professional footballer who played as a right-back or a central defender, currently a manager.

He appeared in 162 La Liga matches in a 16-year senior career, mainly in representation of Deportivo (five seasons). He added 111 games and nine goals in the Segunda División.

== Playing career ==
Héctor was born in Almería, Andalusia, and started playing with local Polideportivo Almería in the Segunda División B. In 1995 he signed with another side in that tier, Elche CF, achieving promotion to Segunda División two years later.

After Elche were relegated the immediate season after, Héctor returned to his native region and joined Sevilla FC. Ever-present during his three-year tenure, he won two promotions to La Liga, scoring a career-high five goals in 2000–01 but also experiencing relegation the previous campaign; his first match in the competition came on 22 August 1999, in a 2–2 home draw against Real Sociedad.

Free agent Héctor signed for Deportivo de La Coruña following the Galicians' league conquest, and proceeded to be relatively used, notably helping them to the 2002 edition of the Copa del Rey. In summer 2006 he moved to RCD Mallorca of the same league on a two-year contract, where he managed 29 league appearances in his second year, retiring aged 33 after helping the Balearic Islands team to a final seventh place.

== Coaching career ==
Berenguel went back to Andalusia in the 2009 off-season, taking charge of CD Roquetas' youth academy. In 2011–12 he had his first senior coaching experience, starting the third-tier campaign with local Polideportivo Ejido, with the club folding after a couple of months.

Berenguel then signed for amateurs CD Comarca del Mármol, overseeing two consecutive promotions to reach Tercera División in 2015. Following three years of inactivity, he was then part of Fran Fernández's staff at AD Alcorcón (twice) and CD Tenerife.

On 3 July 2023, Berenguel returned to managerial duties after being appointed at Primera Federación side San Fernando CD. On 16 October, having collected two wins in eight matches, he was dismissed.

== Honours ==
Sevilla

- Segunda División: 2000–01

Deportivo

- Copa del Rey: 2001–02
