= Diego Tristán =

Spanish footballer (born 1976)

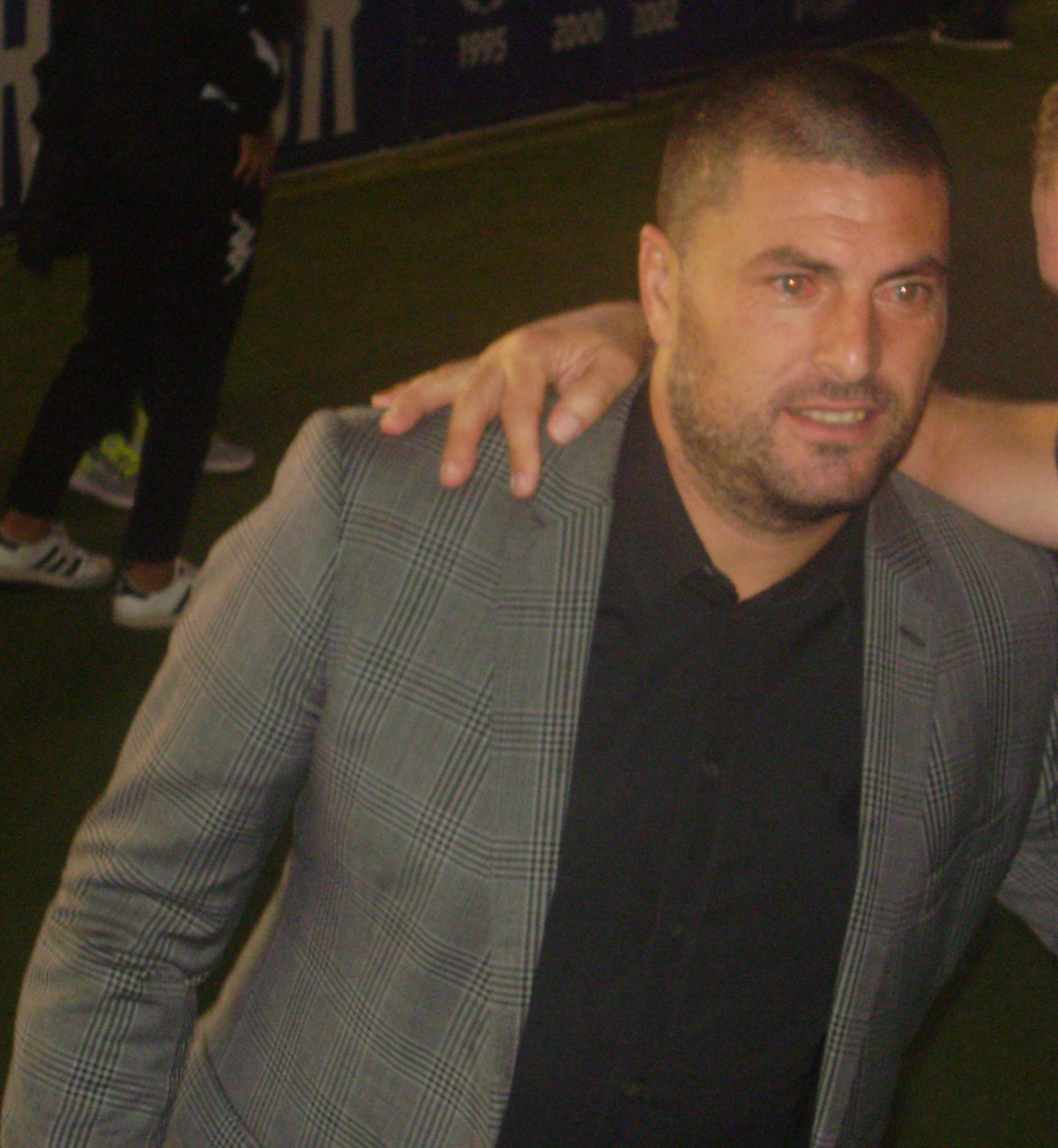
- Tristán in 2016

Personal information
- Full name: Diego Tristán Herrera
- Date of birth: 5 January 1976 (age 50)
- Place of birth: La Algaba, Spain
- Height: 1.86 m (6 ft 1 in)
- Position: Striker

Youth career
- Betis

Senior career*
Years	Team	Apps	(Gls)
1995–1998	Betis B	94	(33)
1998–1999	Mallorca B	39	(15)
1999–2000	Mallorca	35	(18)
2000–2006	Deportivo La Coruña	179	(77)
2006–2007	Mallorca	13	(0)
2007–2008	Livorno	21	(1)
2008–2009	West Ham United	14	(3)
2009–2010	Cádiz	29	(8)
Total		424	(155)

International career
2001–2003	Spain	15	(4)
- * Club domestic league appearances and goals

Diego Tristán Herrera (born 5 January 1976) is a Spanish former professional footballer who played as a striker.

At his peak, he was considered amongst the best players in his position in Europe, displaying a vast array of skills: dribbling, shot accuracy, aerial ability and off-the-ball movements. He was best known for his Deportivo de La Coruña spell, where he spent six years, often overshadowed by physical and personal problems.

Over eight La Liga seasons, Tristán amassed totals of 227 matches and 95 goals, being top scorer in 2001–02. He appeared with the Spain national team at the 2002 World Cup.

== Club career ==
=== Early years ===
Born in La Algaba, Province of Seville, Tristán came through the youth ranks of local Real Betis, going on to finish his sporting development with the reserves of Mallorca.

After one season in the Segunda División, he made his La Liga debut in 1999–2000, scoring against Numancia on 12 September 1999. He ended his first top-flight campaign with 18 goals.

=== Deportivo ===
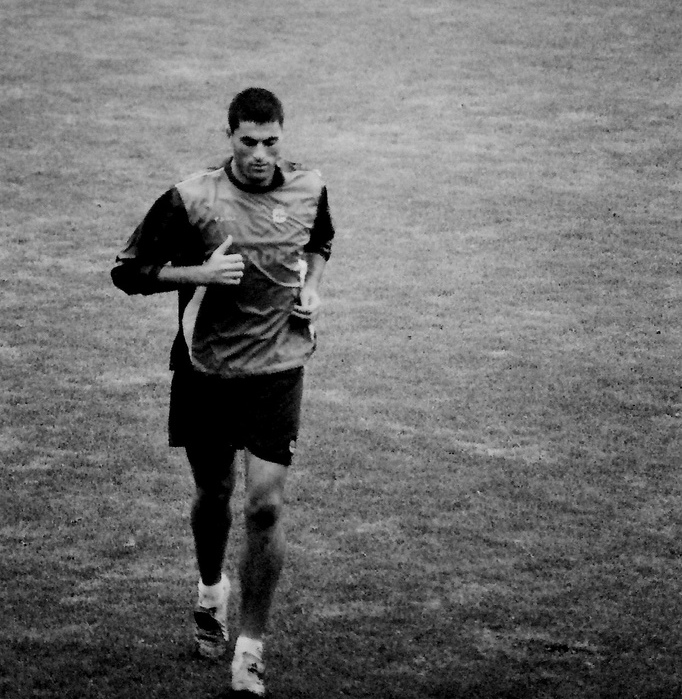
Tristán with Deportivo in 2009

After nearly moving to league powerhouse Real Madrid in the summer of 2000, a deal barred by Lorenzo Sanz's exit from the club's presidency, Tristán joined Deportivo de La Coruña. He formed a dreaded attacking partnership – on occasions, as Depor mainly operated in a 4–5–1 formation under Javier Irureta – with Dutchman Roy Makaay.

As Makaay was first-choice in 2000–01, Tristán threatened to quit Deportivo when he found himself in and out of the side, but became an undisputed starter the following season and responded, netting 21 league goals and taking home the Pichichi Trophy, which included a hat-trick in a 5–0 win over former club Mallorca. He added six in that campaign's UEFA Champions League and five in the Copa del Rey, which his team won after beating Real Madrid at the Santiago Bernabéu Stadium, for a total of 32 goals.

Tristán injured his ankle on international duty in 2002, losing again the starting berth to Makaay who even won the European Golden Boot for his performances. The former could not adapt to his secondary role, but still scored 19 overall goals for the Galicians during that season.

Even when Makaay left Deportivo for Bayern Munich, Tristán never regained his form and confidence: in the 2003–04 campaign he played just ten complete matches and was taken off in 20. He only produced 13 goals (eight in the league, two in the domestic cup and three in the Champions League, including one in a 8–3 away defeat to Monaco on 5 November 2003).

=== Journeyman ===
In total, Tristán scored 111 goals in a Deportivo shirt, leaving in July 2006 along with teammate Lionel Scaloni. After being linked with several clubs in Spain and overseas, including Bolton Wanderers, he agreed to rejoin Mallorca after a six-year hiatus. He left in June 2007, having featured rarely for the Gregorio Manzano-led side.

Tristán signed a one-year contract with Serie A's Livorno in July 2007, as the Italians searched for a replacement for Shakhtar Donetsk-bound Cristiano Lucarelli. He failed to impress during his stint in Tuscany, scoring only once during the campaign and eventually dropping down to the Serie B.

On 29 September 2008, it was confirmed Tristán was undergoing a trial at West Ham United of the Premier League. On 14 October he agreed to a deal, making his debut on 8 December as a late substitute in the 0–2 home defeat against Tottenham Hotspur. He scored his first goal for the club in the 2–1 home victory over Stoke City later that month, also coming from the bench.

=== Cádiz ===
On 24 July 2009, Tristán joined second division club Cádiz after having been released by West Ham at the end of the season, thus returning to his native Andalusia after 14 years. He regained some of his scoring form in his only campaign, but his team was relegated after finishing in 19th position; although he himself grabbed a brace in the last league match, a 4–2 home win against Numancia on 19 June 2010, it eventually proved insufficient.

== International career ==
On 2 June 2001, courtesy of his stellar Deportivo performances, Tristán earned a debut for Spain, scoring in a 4–1 home win against Bosnia and Herzegovina in a 2002 FIFA World Cup qualifier in Oviedo. In the finals in South Korea and Japan he appeared sparingly for the quarter-finalists after picking up an injury, and did not manage to find the net.

Tristán scored on the last of his 15 caps, a 3–0 friendly victory in Portugal on 6 September 2003.

== Career statistics ==
=== Club ===
Appearances and goals by club, season and competition
Club	Season	League			Cup		Continental		Total	
Club	Season	Division	Apps	Goals	Apps	Goals	Apps	Goals	Apps	Goals
Betis B	1995–96	Segunda División B	38	11	–		–		38	11
Betis B	1996–97	Segunda División B	32	11	–		–		32	11
Betis B	1997–98	Segunda División B	24	11	–		–		24	11
Betis B	Total		94	33	0	0	0	0	94	33
Mallorca B	1998–99	Segunda División	39	15	–		–		39	15
Mallorca	1999–2000	La Liga	35	18	0	0	11	5	46	23
Deportivo	2000–01	La Liga	29	19	3	2	11	2	43	23
Deportivo	2001–02	La Liga	34	21	6	5	12	6	52	32
Deportivo	2002–03	La Liga	23	9	8	6	10	4	41	19
Deportivo	2003–04	La Liga	34	8	3	2	11	4	48	14
Deportivo	2004–05	La Liga	23	9	2	2	1	0	26	11
Deportivo	2005–06	La Liga	36	11	3	0	5	1	44	12
Deportivo	Total		179	77	25	17	50	17	254	111
Mallorca	2006–07	La Liga	13	0	3	0	–		16	0
Livorno	2007–08	Serie A	21	1	1	0	–		22	1
West Ham United	2008–09	Premier League	14	3	3	0	–		17	3
Cádiz	2009–10	Segunda División	29	8	1	0	–		30	8
Career total			424	155	33	17	61	22	518	194

=== International ===
Appearances and goals by national team and year
National team	Year	Apps	Goals
Spain	2001	5	2
Spain	2002	6	0
Spain	2003	4	2
Total		15	4

Scores and results list Spain's goal tally first, score column indicates score after each Tristán goal.

List of international goals scored by Diego Tristán
#	Date	Venue	Opponent	Score	Result	Competition
1.	2 June 2001	Carlos Tartiere, Oviedo, Spain	Bosnia and Herzegovina	4–1	4–1	2002 FIFA World Cup qualification
2.	1 September 2001	Mestalla, Valencia, Spain	Austria	1–0	4–0	2002 FIFA World Cup qualification
3.	2 April 2003	Antonio Amilivia, León, Spain	Armenia	1–0	3–0	UEFA Euro 2004 qualifying
4.	6 September 2003	D. Afonso Henriques, Guimarães, Portugal	Portugal	3–0	3–0	Friendly

== Honours ==
Deportivo

- Copa del Rey: 2001–02
- Supercopa de España: 2000

Individual

- Pichichi Trophy: 2001–02
