= Changui (footballer) =

Spanish footballer

Personal information
- Full name: Marcos Javier Yáñez Fernández
- Date of birth: 10 April 1977 (age 49)
- Place of birth: Boiro, Spain
- Height: 1.82 m (6 ft 0 in)
- Position: Striker

Youth career
- Boiro
- 1993–1996: Compostela

Senior career*
| Years | Team | Apps | (Gls) |
| 1996–1997 | Vista Alegre | 34 | (27) |
| 1997–2000 | Compostela | 48 | (20) |
| 1998–1999 | → Pontevedra (loan) | 28 | (21) |
| 2000–2006 | Deportivo La Coruña | 2 | (0) |
| 2000–2001 | → Elche (loan) | 28 | (6) |
| 2001–2002 | → Poli Ejido (loan) | 11 | (1) |
| 2003–2004 | → Las Palmas (loan) | 34 | (3) |
| 2005 | → Pontevedra (loan) | 15 | (3) |
| 2005–2006 | → Skoda Xanthi (loan) | 1 | (0) |
| 2006–2007 | Extremadura | 30 | (8) |
| 2007–2009 | Ciudad Santiago | 20 | (4) |
| 2009–2011 | Boiro | | |
| 2011–2012 | Estradense | 31 | (9) |
| 2012–2013 | Atlético Riveira | | |
| 2013–2017 | Ribadumia | 132 | (98) |
| 2017–2018 | Puebla | 33 | (17) |
| 2018–2020 | Boiro | 50 | (13) |
| Total | | 497 | (230) |
- * Club domestic league appearances and goals

Marcos Javier Yáñez Fernández (born 10 April 1977), known as Changui, is a Spanish former footballer who played as a striker.

He spent most of his career with Galician teams, appearing for Compostela and Deportivo de La Coruña in La Liga.

== Club career ==
Born in Boiro, A Coruña, Changui's beginnings as a professional were with SD Compostela, appearing in La Liga during the 1997–98 season by playing six matches and scoring one goal, against Racing de Santander in a 1–1 away draw. He went on to represent several Segunda División teams before being purchased by Deportivo de La Coruña in 2000, although he would play almost no part during his tenure (two league appearances in 2004–05, 13 minutes played), also serving a loan to UD Las Palmas.

Changui was again loaned in August 2005, this time to Greek side Skoda Xanthi FC. Months later, he came back to Spain without his parent club's permission, facing the subsequent and pertinent disciplinary proceedings; the player was summoned by Deportivo on 8 March 2006 but did not appear, sending instead his agent, who stated that he did not know about the player's departure from Xanthi until the Spaniards took action.

Finally, Deportivo cancelled Changui's contract on 9 June 2006. The latter reacted demanding the former for unpaid wages, after having signed for CF Extremadura.

After being released by Extremadura, Changui joined SD Ciudad de Santiago of the Tercera División. He helped them to achieve promotion to Segunda División B in the 2007–08 campaign and, in 2009, resumed his career in the amateur leagues in his native region.

Changui became president of fourth-tier CD Boiro in 2018. At the same time, he was the team's top scorer and also worked as a security guard.

== Personal life ==
In October 2016, the 39-year-old Changui was placed in an induced coma after being admitted to the Conxo Hospital in Santiago de Compostela with an extremely high temperature. He eventually recovered fully after being diagnosed with sepsis, and returned to playing football with his team Ribadumia CF.
