= Fernando Sánchez (footballer) =

Spanish footballer and manager

Fernando
Personal information
- Full name: Fernando Sánchez Cipitria
- Date of birth: 12 September 1971 (age 55)
- Place of birth: Madrid, Spain
- Height: 1.85 m (6 ft 1 in)
- Position: Midfielder

Team information
- Current team: Xinjiang Silk Road Eagle (manager)

Youth career
- Real Madrid

Senior career*
Years	Team	Apps	(Gls)
1990–1992	Real Madrid C		
1992–1995	Real Madrid B	68	(2)
1992–1993	→ Leganés (loan)	26	(3)
1995–1997	Valladolid	78	(18)
1997–1999	Betis	60	(4)
1999–2003	Deportivo La Coruña	33	(3)
2001–2002	→ Osasuna (loan)	30	(2)
2002	→ Hannover 96 (loan)	2	(0)
2003	→ Córdoba (loan)	6	(1)
Total		303	(33)

International career
1998	Spain	2	(0)

Managerial career
- 2007: Laguna
- 2008–2009: Collado Villalba
- 2019–2020: Xinjiang Tianshan Leopard
- 2024–: Xinjiang Silk Road Eagle
- * Club domestic league appearances and goals

Fernando Sánchez Cipitria (born 12 September 1971), known simply as Fernando, is a Spanish former professional footballer who played mostly as a left midfielder, currently manager of Chinese Champions League club Xinjiang Silk Road Eagle.

He appeared in 201 La Liga matches over seven seasons (27 goals), for four clubs.

== Club career ==
Fernando was born in Madrid. An unsuccessful youth graduate from Real Madrid, he made his La Liga debut with Real Valladolid in the 1995–96 season, with the side being coached by a young Rafael Benítez and also featuring former Real Madrid Castilla teammates José Luis Santamaría and Alberto Marcos.

In the following campaign, with Fernando scoring a career-best 11 goals, the Castile and León team qualified for the UEFA Cup after finishing seventh. Subsequently, he signed with Real Betis, posting two respectable top-flight seasons and netting his only goal in the UEFA Cup on 3 November 1998 in a 3–0 second-round home win over Willem II.

Fernando joined Deportivo de La Coruña for 1999–2000, and appeared in 19 games for the Galicians in their first-ever championship title. He would, however, soon be deemed surplus to requirements, and served three consecutive loans until his retirement at 32: he played the first part of the 2002–03 campaign at Hannover 96 in Germany alongside teammates Jaime (also with him at Real Madrid) and José Manuel, but soon grew unsettled and returned to Spain.

== International career ==
Fernando earned two caps for the Spain national team over the course of two months. His first arrived on 28 January 1998, as he came on as an 82nd-minute substitute for Guillermo Amor in a 1–0 away friendly loss against France.

== Coaching career ==
After retiring, Fernando focused on youth training. In 2012, he joined Evergrande Football School founded by Guangzhou Evergrande, where he worked as technical director and head coach.

Fernando joined Xinjiang Tianshan Leopard's youth side in the 2018 season, and was promoted to the first team on 1 January 2019. On 8 February 2024, he took on the role as manager of Chinese Champions League club Xinjiang Silk Road Eagle.
