= 2000–01 La Liga =

70th season of La Liga

La Liga
- Season: 2000–01
- Dates: 9 September 2000 – 17 June 2001
- Champions: Real Madrid; 28th title
- Relegated: Real Oviedo; Racing Santander; Numancia
- Champions League: Real Madrid; Deportivo La Coruña; Mallorca; Barcelona
- UEFA Cup: Valencia; Celta Vigo; Zaragoza (as Copa del Rey winners)
- Matches: 380
- Goals: 1,095 (2.88 per match)
- Top goalscorer: Raúl (24 goals)
- Biggest home win: Barcelona 7–0 Athletic Bilbao (3 February 2001)
- Biggest away win: Real Sociedad 0–6 Barcelona (14 October 2000)
- Highest scoring: Barcelona 4–4 Zaragoza (14 April 2001); Villarreal 4–4 Barcelona (8 April 2001)

The 2000–01 La Liga season was the 70th since its establishment. It began on 9 September 2000, and concluded on 17 June 2001.

== Teams ==
Twenty teams competed in the league – the top seventeen teams from the previous season and the three teams promoted from the Segunda División. The promoted teams were Las Palmas, Osasuna and Villarreal, returning to the top flight after an absence of twelve, six and one years respectively. They replaced Betis, Atlético Madrid and Sevilla, ending their top flight spells of six, sixty six and one year respectively. For the first time in 26 years, there was no team from Seville.

== Team information ==
=== Clubs and locations ===
Location of teams in La Liga 2000–01

2000–01 season was composed of the following clubs:

Team	Stadium	Capacity
Barcelona	Camp Nou	98,772
Real Madrid	Santiago Bernabéu	80,354
Espanyol	Estadi Olímpic de Montjuïc	55,926
Valencia	Mestalla	55,000
Athletic Bilbao	San Mamés	39,750
Deportivo de La Coruña	Riazor	34,600
Real Zaragoza	La Romareda	34,596
Celta de Vigo	Estadio Balaídos	32,500
Real Sociedad	Anoeta	32,200
Real Oviedo	Carlos Tartiere	30,500
Málaga	La Rosaleda	30,044
Valladolid	José Zorrilla	27,846
Mallorca	Son Moix	23,142
Villarreal*	El Madrigal	23,000
Racing de Santander	El Sardinero	22,222
Las Palmas*	Insular	21,000
Alavés	Mendizorrotza	19,840
Osasuna*	El Sadar	19,553
Rayo Vallecano	Campo de Fútbol de Vallecas	14,505
Numancia	Los Pajaritos	8,261

(*) Promoted from Segunda División

== League table ==
Pos	Team	Pld	W	D	L	GF	GA	GD	Pts	Qualification or relegation
1	Real Madrid (C)	38	24	8	6	81	40	+41	80	Qualification for the Champions League group stage
2	Deportivo La Coruña	38	22	7	9	73	44	+29	73	Qualification for the Champions League group stage
3	Mallorca	38	20	11	7	61	43	+18	71	Qualification for the Champions League third qualifying round
4	Barcelona	38	17	12	9	80	57	+23	63 (Note: VAL 0–1 BAR; BAR 3–2 VAL)	Qualification for the Champions League third qualifying round
5	Valencia	38	18	9	11	55	34	+21	63	Qualification for the UEFA Cup first round
6	Celta Vigo	38	16	11	11	51	49	+2	59	Qualification for the UEFA Cup first round
7	Villarreal	38	16	9	13	58	52	+6	57	
8	Málaga	38	16	8	14	60	61	−1	56	
9	Espanyol	38	15	7	16	46	44	+2	52	
10	Alavés	38	14	7	17	58	59	−1	49	
11	Las Palmas	38	13	7	18	42	62	−20	46	
12	Athletic Bilbao	38	11	10	17	44	60	−16	43 (Note: ATH: 9 pts; RSO: 6 pts; RVA: 3 pts)	
13	Real Sociedad	38	11	10	17	52	68	−16	43	
14	Rayo Vallecano	38	10	13	15	56	68	−12	43	
15	Osasuna	38	10	12	16	43	54	−11	42 (Note: OSA: 7 pts; VLD: 5 pts; ZAR: 4 pts)	
16	Valladolid	38	9	15	14	42	50	−8	42	
17	Zaragoza	38	9	15	14	54	57	−3	42	Qualification for the UEFA Cup first round (Note: Zaragoza entered UEFA Cup as winners of 2000–01 Copa del Rey.)
18	Oviedo (R)	38	11	8	19	51	67	−16	41	Relegation to the Segunda División
19	Racing Santander (R)	38	10	9	19	48	62	−14	39 (Note: RAC 4–2 NUM; NUM 1–0 RAC)	Relegation to the Segunda División
20	Numancia (R)	38	10	9	19	40	64	−24	39	Relegation to the Segunda División

Source: LFP
Rules for classification: 1st points; 2nd head-to-head points; 3rd head-to-head goal difference; 4th head-to-head goals scored; 5th goal difference; 6th number of goals scored; 7th Fair-play points
(C) Champions; (R) Relegated

== Results ==
Home \ Away	ATH	FCB	CEL	ALV	RCD	ESP	LPA	MCF	MLL	NUM	OSA	RAC	RVA	RMA	ROV	RSO	VCF	VLD	VIL	ZAR
Athletic Bilbao		3–1	2–1	2–0	2–2	0–1	0–3	1–3	2–1	3–1	0–1	3–1	4–2	1–0	4–0	1–3	1–1	1–1	1–1	1–2
Barcelona	7–0		1–1	3–2	2–3	4–2	4–1	2–1	1–1	1–1	2–0	3–1	5–1	2–0	0–1	3–0	3–2	3–1	1–2	4–4
Celta de Vigo	2–1	3–3		1–1	2–1	1–0	0–1	1–0	2–2	1–1	1–0	1–1	1–1	3–0	1–0	4–1	3–2	2–1	1–0	1–1
Alavés	2–1	0–1	2–2		3–1	1–0	1–0	1–2	2–4	0–2	2–0	5–1	4–2	1–3	4–0	0–1	1–1	4–2	0–1	1–0
Deportivo La Coruña	2–0	2–0	1–0	2–1		1–0	4–0	4–0	1–1	4–1	2–1	2–1	1–1	2–2	3–0	4–1	2–0	1–2	4–2	2–0
Espanyol	2–1	0–0	0–1	0–0	0–2		3–2	1–2	0–1	2–0	1–2	3–0	0–0	1–2	2–0	1–2	1–0	1–0	2–1	5–0
Las Palmas	0–0	0–1	0–1	0–3	2–0	1–0		2–1	1–0	1–1	3–2	2–1	1–0	0–1	1–0	2–1	0–2	1–1	1–5	2–1
Málaga	2–1	0–0	1–4	3–1	1–3	0–0	2–1		0–1	1–3	3–1	2–1	1–1	3–3	2–2	3–0	3–0	3–1	2–1	2–0
Mallorca	1–0	2–0	2–0	4–3	2–1	3–2	2–1	0–1		2–1	1–1	2–1	4–0	1–0	4–2	1–1	2–2	1–1	2–1	2–1
Numancia	0–0	1–1	4–2	2–1	1–2	2–1	0–1	3–2	0–2		1–0	1–0	0–2	3–1	1–0	3–3	0–3	0–0	1–3	1–1
Osasuna	1–1	3–1	0–2	0–1	1–1	1–3	3–3	3–3	1–0	2–0		1–1	2–2	2–3	0–0	1–1	1–2	2–1	1–0	1–0
Racing Santander	3–0	4–0	3–0	2–1	0–3	1–2	2–1	0–1	2–1	4–2	0–0		1–1	0–0	2–0	1–4	1–1	2–2	3–1	2–1
Rayo Vallecano	1–2	2–2	3–0	0–1	1–1	1–1	1–1	4–2	2–2	2–1	2–1	4–1		0–1	0–2	4–1	1–4	2–1	0–1	0–0
Real Madrid	4–1	2–2	3–0	5–0	3–0	2–2	5–1	4–3	0–2	1–0	1–1	1–0	3–1		4–0	4–0	2–1	2–1	4–0	3–0
Oviedo	5–0	2–3	3–1	3–3	2–3	2–2	2–2	3–2	1–1	3–0	2–3	1–0	4–1	1–1		1–0	0–0	4–1	1–3	2–1
Real Sociedad	0–2	0–6	2–2	1–1	1–1	2–1	1–1	4–0	0–1	4–1	0–1	2–2	2–0	1–4	3–0		1–2	3–1	0–2	1–1
Valencia	1–0	0–1	1–0	1–2	0–1	0–1	5–1	2–0	4–0	3–0	1–0	1–0	2–2	0–1	2–0	2–0		1–0	3–1	1–0
Valladolid	0–0	2–2	1–2	2–1	3–1	1–1	1–0	0–0	2–0	2–0	1–1	1–1	1–3	2–2	1–0	2–1	0–0		0–0	2–0
Villarreal	0–0	4–4	2–0	2–0	3–2	4–0	2–1	1–2	2–2	0–0	2–0	4–2	1–5	0–1	1–0	1–3	1–1	2–1		1–1
Zaragoza	2–2	3–1	1–1	2–2	2–1	1–2	3–1	1–1	1–1	3–1	4–2	2–0	6–1	2–3	5–2	1–1	1–1	0–0	0–0	

Source: LFP (in Spanish)
Legend: Blue = home team win; Yellow = draw; Red = away team win.

== Overall ==
- Most wins – Real Madrid (24)
- Fewest wins – Valladolid and Zaragoza (9)
- Most draws – Valladolid and Zaragoza (15)
- Fewest draws – Deportivo La Coruña, Alavés and Las Palmas (7)
- Most losses – Real Oviedo, Racing Santander and Numancia (19)
- Fewest losses – Real Madrid (6)
- Most goals scored – Real Madrid (81)
- Fewest goals scored – Numancia (40)
- Most goals conceded – Real Sociedad and Rayo Vallecano (68)
- Fewest goals conceded – Valencia (34)

== Awards ==
=== Pichichi Trophy ===
The Pichichi Trophy is awarded to the player who scores the most goals in a season.

Rank	Player	Club	Goals
1	(Spain) Raúl	Real Madrid	24
2	(Brazil) Rivaldo	Barcelona	23
3	(Spain) Javi Moreno	Alavés	22
4	(Spain) Diego Tristán	Deportivo La Coruña	19
5	(Netherlands) Patrick Kluivert	Barcelona	18

=== Fair Play award ===
Real Madrid was the winner of the Fair-play award with 86 points, second was Espanyol and third Zaragoza.

=== Pedro Zaballa award ===
Manolo Hidalgo, Atlético Madrid footballer, making the same action as Pedro Zaballa

== Attendances ==
#	Club	Avg. attendance	% change	Highest
1	Real Madrid	64,475	8.7%	76,300
2	FC Barcelona	62,632	-4.4%	98,000
3	Valencia CF	42,737	5.9%	50,000
4	Athletic Club	32,105	-6.9%	39,000
5	Deportivo de La Coruña	28,921	6.3%	35,500
6	Real Zaragoza	25,053	13.9%	32,000
7	Real Sociedad	25,000	-0.9%	30,000
8	Real Oviedo	23,421	100.1%	29,000
9	Celta de Vigo	21,684	-4.5%	30,000
10	RCD Espanyol	18,500	-2.1%	31,800
11	CA Osasuna	17,260	67.4%	19,533
12	UD Las Palmas	17,235	9.2%	20,000
13	RCD Mallorca	16,637	1.5%	23,000
14	Málaga CF	15,789	-42.6%	28,000
15	Racing de Santander	15,684	-0.9%	22,000
16	Villarreal CF	15,368	73.4%	17,000
17	Deportivo Alavés	13,984	-18.5%	18,137
18	Real Valladolid	13,253	-0.5%	23,000
19	CD Numancia	9,337	3.3%	13,000
20	Rayo Vallecano	9,079	-6.8%	15,000

== See also ==
- 2000–01 Segunda División
- 2000–01 Copa del Rey
