= Manel (footballer, born 1971) =

Spanish footballer

Personal information
- Full name: José Manuel Menéndez Erimia
- Date of birth: 7 January 1971 (age 55)
- Place of birth: Avilés, Spain
- Height: 1.70 m (5 ft 7 in)
- Position: Midfielder

Youth career
- Avilés

Senior career*
Years	Team	Apps	(Gls)
1989–1992	Avilés	60	(0)
1992–1994	Oviedo B	42	(5)
1994–1999	Oviedo	172	(4)
1999–2003	Deportivo La Coruña	6	(0)
2000–2001	→ Numancia (loan)	33	(0)
2001–2002	→ Tenerife (loan)	23	(0)
2003	→ Oviedo (loan)	12	(0)
2003–2004	Ciudad Murcia	31	(0)
2004–2008	Eibar	114	(1)
Total		493	(10)

International career
2000–2002	Asturias	3	(0)

Managerial career
- 2010–2011: Avilés (youth)
- 2012–2013: Avilés (youth)
- 2013–2015: Astur (youth)
- 2015: Avilés B
- 2017–2018: Marino Luanco (assistant)
- 2018–2020: Praviano
- 2020–2021: Mosconia
- 2021–2023: Marino Luanco
- 2023: Compostela
- * Club domestic league appearances and goals

José Manuel Menéndez Erimia (born 7 January 1971 in Avilés, Asturias), commonly known as Manel, is a Spanish former professional footballer who played as a midfielder. He is currently a manager.

== Honours ==
Avilés

- Segunda División B: 1989–90

Deportivo

- La Liga: 1999–2000

Eibar

- Segunda División B: 2006–07
