= José Manuel (footballer, born 1973) =

Spanish footballer

Personal information
- Full name: José Manuel Colmenero Crespo
- Date of birth: 29 November 1973 (age 52)
- Place of birth: Gijón, Spain
- Height: 1.75 m (5 ft 9 in)
- Position: Midfielder

Youth career
- Llano 2000
- Sporting Gijón

Senior career*
Years	Team	Apps	(Gls)
1992–1996	Sporting Gijón B	84	(13)
1992–1993	→ Ribadesella (loan)	21	(3)
1994–1999	Sporting Gijón	63	(1)
1996–1997	→ Mallorca (loan)	34	(0)
1999–2003	Deportivo La Coruña	4	(0)
2000	→ Compostela (loan)	12	(1)
2000–2001	→ Numancia (loan)	28	(5)
2002	→ Hannover 96 (loan)	1	(0)
2003	→ Poli Ejido (loan)	14	(0)
2003–2004	Elche	18	(0)
2004–2005	Pontevedra	5	(0)
2005–2006	Marbella	27	(1)
2006–2009	Roquetas	50	(1)
2009–2010	Marino	10	(1)
Total		371	(26)
- * Club domestic league appearances and goals

José Manuel Colmenero Crespo (born 29 November 1973), known as José Manuel, is a Spanish former professional footballer who played as a right midfielder.

== Club career ==
José Manuel was born in Gijón, Asturias. A product of hometown's Sporting de Gijón youth academy, he was not very successful in his first stint with the club (only 14 first-team appearances over his first three seasons) but, after a loan spell with RCD Mallorca of Segunda División in the 1996–97 campaign, with promotion, he returned as a full member of the main squad, but Sporting were relegated from La Liga in his first year back.

Having attracted attention from Deportivo de La Coruña in 1999 and subsequently purchased for €300.000, José Manuel would then begin a series of loan spells in the first and second divisions. To this, he added a very short experience with Germany's Hannover 96 in the Bundesliga (also on loan, alongside compatriots – in the same situation – Fernando and Jaime).

Finally released in June 2003, José Manuel resumed his career mainly in the Segunda División B, retiring well into his 30s. During this timeframe he played mainly for CD Roquetas, in the third tier but also in the Tercera División.
