= Víctor Sánchez (footballer, born 1976) =

Spanish footballer and manager

Personal information
- Full name: Víctor Sánchez del Amo
- Date of birth: 23 February 1976 (age 50)
- Place of birth: Madrid, Spain
- Height: 1.83 m (6 ft 0 in)
- Position: Right midfielder

Team information
- Current team: Kalba (manager)

Youth career
- 1987–1994: Real Madrid

Senior career*
Years	Team	Apps	(Gls)
1994–1995	Real Madrid C	17	(3)
1995–1996	Real Madrid B	37	(1)
1996–1998	Real Madrid	65	(7)
1998–1999	Racing Santander	35	(12)
1999–2006	Deportivo La Coruña	210	(30)
2006–2007	Panathinaikos	12	(0)
2007–2008	Elche	17	(2)
Total		393	(55)

International career
1996–1998	Spain U21	12	(3)
2000–2004	Spain	8	(0)

Managerial career
- 2010–2011: Getafe (assistant)
- 2012–2013: Sevilla (assistant)
- 2013–2015: Olympiacos (assistant)
- 2015–2016: Deportivo La Coruña
- 2016: Olympiacos
- 2016–2017: Betis
- 2019–2020: Málaga
- 2023: Cartagena
- 2024–2025: Olimpija Ljubljana
- 2025–2026: Rijeka
- 2026–: Kalba
- * Club domestic league appearances and goals

Víctor Sánchez del Amo (born 23 February 1976) is a Spanish football manager and former professional player who played as a right midfielder. He is the current manager of UAE Pro League club Kalba FC.

His crossing ability was among the qualities that brought him international recognition with Spain, and especially Deportivo. He started his career with Real Madrid and went on to win a total of seven major titles between the two clubs; over 11 seasons in La Liga, where he also represented Racing de Santander, he amassed totals of 310 matches and 49 goals.

After five years as an assistant, Sánchez began working as a manager in 2015. He notably won the 2024–25 Slovenian PrvaLiga with Olimpija Ljubljana.

== Club career ==
=== Real Madrid ===
Sánchez was born in Madrid. Being a product of the famous Real Madrid youth system, he made his first-team debut on 25 May 1996 in the season's last matchday, a 1–0 away win against Real Zaragoza.

Almost never a starter during his spell in the capital, Sánchez did appear in 36 La Liga games in 1996–97 (25 starts, five goals) as the Fabio Capello-led side won the national championship. He also played a supporting role in Madrid's conquest of the following campaign's UEFA Champions League.

=== Deportivo ===
For 1998–99, Sánchez had to leave his hometown club as he faced stiff competition, and his first stop was Racing de Santander where he scored 12 top-division goals to earn a move to Deportivo de La Coruña. In the 1999–2000 season, he missed just one league match as they won the league – their first – netting four times.

It was as a creator rather than scorer, however, that Sánchez impressed in the 2001–02 edition of the Champions League, a season which saw the Galicians win the Copa del Rey. He helped Depor to a third-place finish in 2002–03 with four goals in 30 games, adding a couple in the Champions League prior to the team's second group stage elimination.

Sánchez enjoyed his best return in front of goal in 2003–04, scoring seven from 31 appearances, including a hat-trick on 3 January 2004 against neighbours Celta de Vigo (5–0 victory), as Deportivo finished third behind Valencia and Barcelona; he failed to find the net, though, in a Champions League campaign which concluded with a semi-final loss to Porto. In his last year, they would finish eighth in the league and the player was not offered a new contract, a decision helped by the fact he had recently been injured.

=== Later career ===
On 3 August 2006, Sánchez signed a two-year contract with Super League Greece giants Panathinaikos for about €1.5 million per year. He appeared sparingly throughout a sole season and, in October 2007, returned to Spain, penning a one-year deal with Segunda División club Elche; he had spent the previous weeks training on his own.

At the end of the campaign, Sánchez renewed his link for a further year, only to back down immediately on his original decision, leaving in July 2008. He retired at the age of 32 due to several injury problems, with nearly 500 competitive matches to his credit.

== International career ==
Sánchez made his debut with Spain in a friendly with Germany on 16 August 2000 (4–1 away loss), and went on to receive eight caps in a four-year span. He had previously participated in the 1998 UEFA European Under-21 Championship, in which the nation emerged victorious 1–0 against Greece.

== Coaching career ==
On 22 December 2010, Sánchez was named Getafe's assistant manager, replacing former Real Madrid teammate Juan Esnáider as sidekick of Míchel – another player with whom he shared teams at the club. On 9 April 2015 he returned to Deportivo, taking over from the sacked Víctor Fernández.

Sánchez was dismissed after the team finished 15th in his only full season, winning just twice in his last 22 games, including an 0–8 home defeat to Barcelona. On 23 June 2016, he succeeded Marco Silva at the helm of Olympiacos. Less than two months later, after being ousted from the Champions League by Hapoel Be'er Sheva, he was relieved of his duties.

On 12 November 2016, Sánchez replaced the fired Gus Poyet at Real Betis. The following 9 May, he was himself shown the door.

On 15 April 2019, after almost two years without a club, Sánchez took the place of the dismissed Juan Muñiz at Málaga. In early January 2020, with the side still in the second tier, the board of directors decided to suspend him indefinitely after a sex video featuring him leaked to the internet; shortly after, he was fired.

On 6 June 2023, having been unemployed for three years, Sánchez was named manager of second-division Cartagena. He was sacked three months later, after winning one of his seven matches in charge.

Sánchez went abroad again in June 2024, being appointed by Slovenian PrvaLiga side Olimpija Ljubljana on a one-year contract with the possibility of a one-year extension. At the end of his only season, he was crowned national champion for his first title as a manager; he left in spite of this, and was replaced by Portugal's Jorge Simão.

On 3 September 2025, Sánchez was named head coach of Rijeka, seventh in the Croatian Football League; he signed a two-year deal. He left by mutual consent the following May, after finishing the league in fourth position and losing the final of the domestic cup to Dinamo Zagreb.

== Managerial statistics ==
As of match played 15 November 2026

Managerial record by team and tenure
Team	Nat	From	To	Record								Ref
Team	Nat	From	To	G	W	D	L	GF	GA	GD	Win %	Ref
Deportivo La Coruña	(Spain)	9 April 2015	30 May 2016	50	10	25	15	59	80	−21	20.00	
Olympiacos	(Greece)	23 June 2016	9 August 2016	2	0	1	1	0	1	−1	0.00	
Betis	(Spain)	12 November 2016	9 May 2017	27	8	5	14	29	42	−13	29.63	
Málaga	(Spain)	15 April 2019	11 January 2020	33	10	12	11	37	32	+5	30.30	
Cartagena	(Spain)	6 June 2023	23 September 2023	7	1	0	6	6	12	−6	14.29	
Olimpija Ljubljana	(Slovenia)	6 June 2024	3 June 2025	56	34	14	8	103	34	+69	60.71	
Rijeka	(Croatia)	3 September 2025	27 May 2026	46	21	13	12	68	41	+27	45.65	
Kalba	(United Arab Emirates)	24 June 2026	Present	12	3	5	4	18	26	−8	25.00	
Total				233	87	75	71	320	268	+52	37.34	—

== Honours ==
=== Player ===
Real Madrid

- La Liga: 1996–97
- Supercopa de España: 1997
- UEFA Champions League: 1997–98

Deportivo

- La Liga: 1999–2000
- Copa del Rey: 2001–02
- Supercopa de España: 2000, 2002

Spain U21

- UEFA European Under-21 Championship: 1998

=== Manager ===
Olimpija Ljubljana

- Slovenian PrvaLiga: 2024–25
