= 2002–03 Deportivo de La Coruña season =

Deportivo de La Coruña
2002–03 season
- President: Augusto César Lendoiro
- Manager: Javier Irureta
- Stadium: Estadio Riazor
- La Liga: 3rd
- Copa del Rey: Semi-finals
- UEFA Champions League: Second group stage
- Supercopa de España: Winners
- Top goalscorer: League: Roy Makaay (29); All: Roy Makaay (39)
Home colours	Away colours	Third colours

The 2002–03 season was Deportivo de La Coruña's 32nd season in La Liga, the top division of Spanish football. They also competed in the Copa del Rey, the UEFA Champions League and the Supercopa de España.

== Season summary ==
The 2002–03 season, Javier Irureta's fifth in charge, started in style for Deportivo. As defending Copa del Rey champions, they qualified for the 2002 Supercopa de España, where they faced Valencia. Three first half goals from Juan Carlos Valerón, Víctor Sánchez and Noureddine Naybet gave them a big advantage after the first leg at Estadio Riazor, and a further goal from Víctor at the Mestalla ensured a 4–0 aggregate victory. Depor therefore claimed the Supercopa trophy for the second time in three seasons.

In La Liga, they just failed to match their top two finishes of the past three years, ending up 3rd, although they still qualified for the 2003–04 UEFA Champions League. In the 2002–03 edition of that tournament, they made it through a tough first round group in which they faced Bayern Munich, Lens and Milan. Their progress was assured after an excellent 2–1 win against the Italians at San Siro on the final matchday. Another tough draw awaited in the second group stage, where they faced Basel, Juventus and Manchester United. Despite finishing level on points with the Swiss and Italian sides, they were eliminated bottom of the group on goal difference, failing to match their quarter-final exploits of the previous two seasons.

In the Copa del Rey, too, they just fell short of their previous high standards. The defending champions were eliminated at the semi-final stage by eventual winners Mallorca. It was a great season for striker Roy Makaay, whose 29 league goals won him both the Pichichi Trophy and the European Golden Shoe.

== Players ==
=== Squad ===
Note: Flags indicate national team as defined under FIFA eligibility rules; some limited exceptions apply. Players may hold more than one non-FIFA nationality.

No.	Pos.	Nation	Player
1	GK	ESP	José Francisco Molina
2	DF	ESP	Manuel Pablo
3	DF	ESP	Enrique Romero
4	DF	MAR	Noureddine Naybet
5	DF	ESP	César Martín
6	MF	BRA	Mauro Silva
7	FW	NED	Roy Makaay
8	DF	ESP	Pablo Amo
9	FW	ESP	Diego Tristán
10	MF	ESP	Fran (captain)
11	MF	ESP	José Amavisca
12	MF	ARG	Lionel Scaloni
13	GK	ESP	Dani Mallo
14	DF	POR	Jorge Andrade
15	DF	ESP	Joan Capdevila

No.	Pos.	Nation	Player
16	MF	ESP	Sergio
17	DF	SCG	Goran Đorović
18	MF	ESP	Víctor Sánchez
19	FW	ESP	Albert Luque
20	MF	ESP	Donato
21	MF	ESP	Juan Carlos Valerón
22	MF	PAR	Roberto Acuña
22	FW	ESP	Iván Pérez
23	MF	ARG	Aldo Duscher
24	DF	ESP	Héctor
25	GK	ESP	Juanmi
32	MF	ESP	Javi Angeriz
33	DF	ESP	Antonio
—	FW	ESP	Changui

==== Left club during season ====
Note: Flags indicate national team as defined under FIFA eligibility rules; some limited exceptions apply. Players may hold more than one non-FIFA nationality.

No.	Pos.	Nation	Player
—	DF	ESP	Manel (on loan to Real Oviedo)
—	MF	BRA	Djalminha (on loan to Austrian Wien)
—	MF	ESP	Jaime (on loan to Hannover 96)

No.	Pos.	Nation	Player
—	MF	ESP	José Manuel (on loan to Hannover 96/Polideportivo Ejido)
—	FW	URU	Walter Pandiani (on loan to Mallorca)
—	FW	URU	Sebastian Abreu (on loan at Cruz Azul)

=== Squad stats ===
Last updated on 2 April 2021.

No.	Pos	Nat	Player	Total		La Liga		Copa del Rey		Champ League		Supercopa	
No.	Pos	Nat	Player	Apps	Goals	Apps	Goals	Apps	Goals	Apps	Goals	Apps	Goals
1	GK	(Spain) ESP	José Francisco Molina	13	0	10	0	0	0	1	0	2	0
2	DF	(Spain) ESP	Manuel Pablo	19	1	7+3	0	8	1	1	0	0	0
3	DF	(Spain) ESP	Enrique Romero	45	1	31	1	1	0	11	0	2	0
4	DF	(Morocco) MAR	Noureddine Naybet	36	2	25	1	1	0	8	0	2	1
5	DF	(Spain) ESP	César Martín	32	2	20	0	2+1	1	7	1	2	0
6	MF	(Brazil) BRA	Mauro Silva	48	0	32	0	4+1	0	9	0	2	0
7	FW	(Netherlands) NED	Roy Makaay	56	39	38	29	2+3	1	11	9	2	0
8	DF	(Spain) ESP	Pablo Amo	6	0	0	0	5+1	0	0	0	0	0
9	FW	(Spain) ESP	Diego Tristán	41	19	16+7	9	8	6	5+5	4	0	0
10	MF	(Spain) ESP	Fran	43	2	26+2	1	2+1	1	10	0	2	0
11	MF	(Spain) ESP	José Amavisca	29	1	11+8	0	4+1	1	1+4	0	0	0
12	MF	(Argentina) ARG	Lionel Scaloni	49	3	25+7	3	2+2	0	9+2	0	2	0
13	GK	(Spain) ESP	Dani Mallo	6	0	1+1	0	3	0	1	0	0	0
14	DF	(Portugal) POR	Jorge Andrade	22	0	11	0	5+1	0	3+1	0	0+1	0
15	DF	(Spain) ESP	Joan Capdevila	42	4	12+13	3	7	0	6+3	1	0+1	0
16	MF	(Spain) ESP	Sergio	55	4	34+3	3	4+2	1	9+1	0	2	0
17	DF	(Serbia and Montenegro) SCG	Goran Đorović	3	0	0+1	0	0+1	0	0+1	0	0	0
18	MF	(Spain) ESP	Víctor Sánchez	42	8	25+5	4	3	0	6+1	2	2	2
19	FW	(Spain) ESP	Albert Luque	49	11	5+27	7	7+1	4	3+6	0	0	0
20	MF	(Spain) ESP	Donato	23	2	14+2	2	2	0	3+2	0	0	0
21	MF	(Spain) ESP	Juan Carlos Valerón	31	3	14+9	2	0+1	0	3+2	0	2	1
22	MF	(Paraguay) PAR	Roberto Acuña	21	1	0+7	0	5+2	1	2+5	0	0	0
22	FW	(Spain) ESP	Iván Pérez	0	0	0	0	0	0	0	0	0	0
23	MF	(Argentina) ARG	Aldo Duscher	47	1	16+15	0	5+1	1	6+2	0	0+2	0
24	DF	(Spain) ESP	Héctor	36	0	18+4	0	3+3	0	7+1	0	0	0
25	GK	(Spain) ESP	Juanmi	42	0	27	0	5	0	10	0	0	0
32	MF	(Spain) ESP	Javi Angeriz	0	0	0	0	0	0	0	0	0	0
33	DF	(Spain) ESP	Antonio	0	0	0	0	0	0	0	0	0	0
	FW	(Spain) ESP	Changui	0	0	0	0	0	0	0	0	0	0
Players who have left the club after the start of the season:
	DF	(Spain) ESP	Manel	0	0	0	0	0	0	0	0	0	0
	MF	(Brazil) BRA	Djalminha	1	0	0	0	0	0	0	0	0+1	0
	MF	(Spain) ESP	Jaime	0	0	0	0	0	0	0	0	0	0
	MF	(Spain) ESP	José Manuel	0	0	0	0	0	0	0	0	0	0
	FW	(Uruguay) URU	Walter Pandiani	1	0	0	0	0	0	0	0	0+1	0

== Competitions ==
=== La Liga ===
==== League table ====
Pos	Team	Pld	W	D	L	GF	GA	GD	Pts	Qualification or relegation
1	Real Madrid (C)	38	22	12	4	86	42	+44	78	Qualification for the Champions League group stage
2	Real Sociedad	38	22	10	6	71	45	+26	76	Qualification for the Champions League group stage
3	Deportivo La Coruña	38	22	6	10	67	47	+20	72	Qualification for the Champions League third qualifying round
4	Celta Vigo	38	17	10	11	45	36	+9	61	Qualification for the Champions League third qualifying round
5	Valencia	38	17	9	12	56	35	+21	60	Qualification for the UEFA Cup first round

Source: LFP
Rules for classification: 1st points; 2nd head-to-head points; 3rd head-to-head goal difference; 4th head-to-head away goals scored; 5th goal difference; 6th number of goals scored; 7th Fair-play points
(C) Champions

==== Matches ====
Win Draw Loss

Match	Opponent	Venue	Result	Goals	Ref
1	Real Betis	H	2–4	0–1 17' Assunção; 0–2 24' (pen.) Alfonso Pérez; 1–2 30' Makaay; 1–3 39' Arzu; 1–4 53' Joaquín; 2–4 75' (pen.) Tristán	
2	Osasuna	A	2–1	0–1 12' Vidrio; 1–1 73' Makaay; 2–1 74' Makaay	
3	Real Valladolid	H	2–0	1–0 12' Makaay; 2–0 28' Makaay	
4	Alavés	A	2–1	0–1 52' Alonso; 1–1 69' Tristán; 2–1 89' Capdevila	
5	Racing Santander	H	0–2	0–1 26' Guerrero; 0–2 70' Guerrero	
6	Villarreal	A	1–3	1–0 7' Víctor Sánchez; 1–1 48' (o.g.) Martín; 1–2 61' (pen.) Víctor; 1–3 87' Belletti	
7	Rayo Vallecano	A	2–1	1–0 24' Makaay; 2–0 49' Makaay; 2–1 90' Corino	
8	Real Madrid	H	0–0		
9	Real Sociedad	A	1–1	0–1 27' Kovačević; 1–1 40' Luque	
10	Barcelona	H	2–0	1–0 82' Scaloni; 2–0 85' Luque	
11	Sevilla	A	1–1	0–1 3' Antoñito; 1–1 48' Makaay	
12	Mallorca	H	2–2	1–0 14' Makaay; 1–1 31' Pandiani; 1–2 45' (pen.) Eto'o; 2–2 71' Makaay	
13	Recreativo	A	1–1	0–1 24' Molina; 1–1 27' Tristán	
14	Málaga	H	1–0	1–0 86' Luque	
15	Valencia	A	1–0	1–0 21' Makaay	
16	Celta Vigo	H	3–0	1–0 42' Tristán; 2–0 48' Sergio; 3–0 89' Luque	
17	Atlético Madrid	A	1–3	0–1 1' Mari; 1–1 5' Makaay; 1–2 77' Torres; 1–3 79' Correa	
18	Athletic Bilbao	H	2–1	0–1 48' (o.g.) Héctor; 1–1 50' Donato; 2–1 84' (o.g.) Karanka	
19	Espanyol	A	1–3	1–0 2' Makaay; 1–1 8' Soldevilla; 1–2 21' Roger; 1–3 26' Morales	
20	Real Betis	A	2–0	1–0 60' Tristán; 2–0 73' Makaay	
21	Osasuna	H	1–1	0–1 46' Muñoz; 1–1 63' Makaay	
22	Real Valladolid	A	1–0	1–0 57' Makaay	
23	Alavés	H	6–0	1–0 15' Tristán; 2–0 19' Tristán; 3–0 34' Makaay; 4–0 52' Makaay; 5–0 59' Tristán; 6–0 62' Luque	
24	Racing Santander	A	2–1	1–0 4' Makaay; 1–1 46' Bodipo; 2–1 81' Luque	
25	Villarreal	H	2–1	0–1 11' (pen.) López; 1–1 30' (pen.) Tristán; 2–1 40' Víctor Sánchez	
26	Rayo Vallecano	H	2–0	1–0 17' (pen.) Makaay; 2–0 85' Naybet	
27	Real Madrid	A	0–2	0–1 44' Zidane; 0–2 49' Ronaldo	
28	Real Sociedad	H	2–1	0–1 15' Kahveci; 1–1 44' Capdevila; 2–1 83' Fran	
29	Barcelona	A	4–2	0–1 2' Saviola; 1–1 16' Scaloni; 1–2 25' Motta; 2–2 49' Makaay; 3–2 64' Makaay; 4–2 74' Sergio	
30	Sevilla	H	3–1	1–0 40' Víctor Sánchez; 2–0 44' (pen.) Makaay; 2–1 50' Antoñito; 3–1 67' Makaay	
31	Mallorca	A	0–3	0–1 3' Eto'o; 0–2 13' Riera; 0–3 63' Eto'o	
32	Recreativo	H	5–0	1–0 25' Valerón; 2–0 26' Víctor Sánchez; 3–0 32' (pen.) Makaay; 4–0 36' Makaay; 5–0 59' Makaay	
33	Málaga	A	2–0	1–0 13' (o.g.) Sanz; 2–0 90' Scaloni	
34	Valencia	H	1–2	0–1 13' Aurélio; 1–1 49' Donato; 1–2 63' Aurélio	
35	Celta Vigo	A	0–3	0–1 57' Jesuli; 0–2 62' Edu; 0–3 78' Edu	
36	Atlético Madrid	H	3–2	0–1 6' (pen.) Albertini; 1–1 13' Romero; 1–2 75' Correa; 2–2 77' Makaay; 3–2 84' Valerón	
37	Athletic Bilbao	A	2–3	0–1 14' del Horno; 0–2 42' Yeste; 1–2 65' Capdevila; 2–2 67' Sergio; 2–3 70' Urzaiz	
38	Espanyol	H	2–1	0–1 12' Roger; 1–1 74' Makaay; 2–1 75' Luque	

=== Copa del Rey ===
Win Draw Loss

Round	Opponent	Venue	Result	Goals	Ref
Round of 64	Corralejo	A	2–1	1–0 12' Luque; 1–1 28' (pen.) Simón; 2–1 75' Martín	
Round of 32	Racing de Ferrol	A	4–3	1–0 20' Tristán; 1–1 31' Cuéllar; 1–2 55' Cuéllar; 2–2 58' Tristán; 3–2 74' Luque; 3–3 82' Yasunaga; 4–3 90' Luque	

Round	Opponent	Aggregate	First leg				Second leg			
Round	Opponent	Aggregate	Venue	Result	Goals	Ref	Venue	Result	Goals	Ref
Round of 16	Alicante	5–2	A	1–1	0–1 38' Morante; 1–1 79' Sergio		H	4–1	1–0 4' Acuña; 1–1 34' Pérez; 2–1 45' Amavisca; 3–1 57' (pen.) Tristán; 4–1 83' Luque	
Quarter-finals	Real Murcia	(a) 4–4	H	1–0	1–0 84' Duscher		A	3–4	1–0 24' Tristán; 2–0 28' Tristán; 2–1 44' Karanka; 2–2 46' Juanma; 2–3 52' (pen.) Tito; 3–3 57' Pablo; 3–4 83' Albiol	
Semi-finals	Mallorca	3–4	H	2–3	0–1 38' Pandiani; 0–2 80' Pandiani; 0–3 81' Eto'o; 1–3 89' (pen.) Tristán; 2–3 90+' Makaay		A	1–1	1–0 20' Fran; 1–1 83' Ibagaza	

=== UEFA Champions League ===
==== First group stage ====
Pos	Team	Pld	W	D	L	GF	GA	GD	Pts	Qualification
1	(Italy) Milan	6	4	0	2	12	7	+5	12	Advance to second group stage
2	(Spain) Deportivo La Coruña	6	4	0	2	11	12	−1	12	Advance to second group stage
3	(France) Lens	6	2	2	2	11	11	0	8	Transfer to UEFA Cup
4	(Germany) Bayern Munich	6	0	2	4	9	13	−4	2	

Source: RSSSF

18 September 2002 1	Bayern Munich (Germany)	2 – 3	(Spain) Deportivo La Coruña	Munich, Germany
20:45 CEST	Salihamidžić 57'; Élber 64'	Report	12', 45+1', 77' Makaay	Stadium: Olympiastadion; Attendance: 40,000; Referee: Graham Poll (England)

24 September 2002 2	Deportivo La Coruña (Spain)	0 – 4	(Italy) Milan	A Coruña, Spain
20:45 CEST		Report	17' Seedorf; 33', 55', 62' Inzaghi	Stadium: Estadio Riazor; Attendance: 27,614; Referee: Kim Milton Nielsen (Denmark)

1 October 2002 3	Deportivo La Coruña (Spain)	3 – 1	(France) Lens	A Coruña, Spain
20:45 CEST	Makaay 41'; Capdevila 79'; Martín 84'	Report	10' Moreira	Stadium: Estadio Riazor; Attendance: 24,734; Referee: Rune Pedersen (Norway)

23 October 2002 4	Lens (France)	3 – 1	(Spain) Deportivo La Coruña	Lens, France
20:45 CEST	Coulibaly 61'; Moreira 79'; Thomert 84'	Report	15' Makaay	Stadium: Stade Félix-Bollaert; Attendance: 37,982; Referee: Valentin Ivanov (Russia)

29 October 2002 5	Deportivo La Coruña (Spain)	2 – 1	(Germany) Bayern Munich	A Coruña, Spain
20:45 CET	Víctor Sánchez 54'; Makaay 89'	Report	77' Santa Cruz	Stadium: Estadio Riazor; Attendance: 26,948; Referee: Anders Frisk (Sweden)

13 November 2002 6	Milan (Italy)	1 – 2	(Spain) Deportivo La Coruña	Milan, Italy
20:45 CET	Tomasson 34'	Report	58' Tristán; 70' Makaay	Stadium: San Siro; Attendance: 56,000; Referee: Mike Riley (England)

==== Second group stage ====
Pos	Team	Pld	W	D	L	GF	GA	GD	Pts	Qualification
1	(England) Manchester United	6	4	1	1	11	5	+6	13	Advance to knockout stage
2	(Italy) Juventus	6	2	1	3	11	11	0	7	Advance to knockout stage
3	(Switzerland) Basel	6	2	1	3	5	10	−5	7	
4	(Spain) Deportivo La Coruña	6	2	1	3	7	8	−1	7	

Source: RSSSF

26 November 2002 1	Deportivo La Coruña (Spain)	2 – 2	(Italy) Juventus	A Coruña, Spain
20:45 CET	Tristán 9'; Makaay 11'	Report	38' Birindelli; 57' Nedvěd	Stadium: Estadio Riazor; Attendance: 27,019; Referee: Herbert Fandel (Germany)

11 December 2002 2	Manchester United (England)	2 – 0	(Spain) Deportivo La Coruña	Manchester, England
19:45 GMT	van Nistelrooy 7', 55'	Report		Stadium: Old Trafford; Attendance: 67,014; Referee: Terje Hauge (Norway)

19 February 2003 3	Basel (Switzerland)	1 – 0	(Spain) Deportivo La Coruña	Basel, Switzerland
20:45 CET	H. Yakin 30'	Report		Stadium: St. Jakob-Park; Attendance: 29,031; Referee: René Temmink (Netherlands)

25 February 2003 4	Deportivo La Coruña (Spain)	1 – 0	(Switzerland) Basel	A Coruña, Spain
20:45 CET	Tristán 4'	Report		Stadium: Estadio Riazor; Attendance: 24,462; Referee: Stéphane Bré (France)

12 March 2003 5	Juventus (Italy)	3 – 2	(Spain) Deportivo La Coruña	Turin, Italy
20:45 CET	Ferrara 13'; Trezeguet 63'; Tudor 90+3'	Report	34' Tristán; 52' Makaay	Stadium: Stadio delle Alpi; Attendance: 25,070; Referee: Anders Frisk (Sweden)

18 March 2003 6	Deportivo La Coruña (Spain)	2 – 0	(England) Manchester United	A Coruña, Spain
20:45 CET	Víctor Sánchez 32'; Lynch 47' (o.g.)	Report		Stadium: Estadio Riazor; Attendance: 25,984; Referee: Vladimír Hriňák (Slovakia)

=== Supercopa de España ===
Win Draw Loss

Round	Opponent	Aggregate	First leg				Second leg			
Round	Opponent	Aggregate	Venue	Result	Goals	Ref	Venue	Result	Goals	Ref
Final	Valencia	4–0	H	3–0	1–0 12' Valerón; 2–0 21' Víctor Sánchez; 3–0 31' Naybet		A	1–0	1–0 90' Víctor Sánchez	
