= 2003–04 Deportivo de La Coruña season =

Deportivo de La Coruña
2003–04 season
- Manager: Javier Irureta
- Stadium: Estadio Riazor
- La Liga: 3rd
- Champions League: Semi-finals
- Copa del Rey: Round of 16
Home colours	Away colours	Third colours

During the 2003–04 Spanish football season, Deportivo de La Coruña competed in La Liga.

== Season summary ==
Deportivo reached the semi-finals of the UEFA Champions League, being knocked out by eventual champions Porto 1–0 on aggregate, Porto's goal coming from a Derlei penalty in the second leg at Estadio Riazor.

== Squad ==
Squad at end of season

Note: Flags indicate national team as defined under FIFA eligibility rules; some limited exceptions apply. Players may hold more than one non-FIFA nationality.

No.	Pos.	Nation	Player
1	GK	ESP	José Molina
2	DF	ESP	Manuel Pablo
3	DF	ESP	Enrique Romero
4	DF	MAR	Noureddine Naybet
5	DF	ESP	César
6	MF	BRA	Mauro Silva
7	FW	URU	Walter Pandiani
8	MF	ESP	Sergio
9	FW	ESP	Diego Tristán
10	MF	ESP	Fran
11	MF	ESP	José Amavisca
12	MF	ARG	Lionel Scaloni
13	GK	URU	Gustavo Munúa

No.	Pos.	Nation	Player
14	DF	POR	Jorge Andrade
15	DF	ESP	Joan Capdevila
16	MF	BRA	Djalminha
17	FW	ESP	Pedro Munitis
18	FW	ESP	Víctor
19	FW	ESP	Albert Luque
20	DF	ESP	Pablo Amo
21	MF	ESP	Juan Carlos Valerón
22	FW	ESP	Iván Pérez
23	MF	ARG	Aldo Duscher
24	DF	ESP	Héctor
25	GK	CMR	Jacques Songo'o

=== Left club during season ===
Note: Flags indicate national team as defined under FIFA eligibility rules; some limited exceptions apply. Players may hold more than one non-FIFA nationality.

No.	Pos.	Nation	Player
22	MF	ESP	Jaime (on loan to Hannover 96)
27	FW	ESP	Changui (on loan to Las Palmas)

No.	Pos.	Nation	Player
—	GK	ESP	Dani Mallo (on loan to Elche)
—	FW	URU	Sebastian Abreu (on loan at Club America)
—	FW	URU	Sebastian Abreu (on loan at Tecos UAG) (January)

== Competitions ==
=== La Liga ===
==== League table ====
Pos	Team	Pld	W	D	L	GF	GA	GD	Pts	Qualification or relegation
1	Valencia (C)	38	23	8	7	71	27	+44	77	Qualification for the Champions League group stage
2	Barcelona	38	21	9	8	63	39	+24	72	Qualification for the Champions League group stage
3	Deportivo La Coruña	38	21	8	9	60	34	+26	71	Qualification for the Champions League third qualifying round
4	Real Madrid	38	21	7	10	72	54	+18	70	Qualification for the Champions League third qualifying round
5	Athletic Bilbao	38	15	11	12	53	49	+4	56	Qualification for the UEFA Cup first round

Source: LFP
Rules for classification: 1st points; 2nd head-to-head points; 3rd head-to-head goal difference; 4th head-to-head goals scored; 5th goal difference; 6th number of goals scored; 7th Fair-play points
(C) Champions

Round 6

Deportivo-Atlético Madrid 5-1

1-0 Fran 6'

1-1 Matías Lequi 11'

2-1 Enrique Romero 31'

3-1 Sergio 50'

4-1 Walter Pandiani 55'

5-1 Lionel Scaloni 90'

=== UEFA Champions League ===
==== Third qualifying round ====
- Deportivo La Coruña 0–0 Rosenborg
- Rosenborg 0–1 Deportivo La Coruña

==== Group stage ====
17 September 2003	AEK Athens (Greece)	1–1	(Spain) Deportivo La Coruña	Athens, Greece
20:45	Tsiartas 86'		Pandiani 12'	Stadium: Leoforos Alexandras Stadium

30 September 2003	Deportivo La Coruña (Spain)	2–0	(Netherlands) PSV Eindhoven	A Coruña, Spain
20:45	Sergio 20'; Pandiani 51' (pen.)			Stadium: Estadio Riazor

21 October 2003	Deportivo La Coruña (Spain)	1–0	(France) AS Monaco	A Coruña, Spain
20:45	Tristán 83'			Stadium: Estadio Riazor

5 November 2003	AS Monaco (France)	8–3	(Spain) Deportivo La Coruña	Monaco
20:45	Rothen 2'; Giuly 11'; Pršo 26', 30', 45+2', 49'; Plašil 47'; Cissé 67'		Tristán 39', 52'; Scaloni 45'	Stadium: Stade Louis II

25 November 2003	Deportivo La Coruña (Spain)	3–0	(Greece) AEK Athens	A Coruña, Spain
20:45	Héctor 22'; Valerón 51'; Luque 71'			Stadium: Estadio Riazor

10 December 2003	PSV Eindhoven (Netherlands)	3–2	(Spain) Deportivo La Coruña	Eindhoven, Netherlands
20:45	De Jong 14', 90+4'; Robben 48'		Luque 59'; Pandiani 83'	Stadium: Philips Stadion

=== First knockout round ===
25 February 2004	Deportivo La Coruña (Spain)	1–0	(Italy) Juventus	A Coruña, Spain
20:45	Luque 37'	Report		Stadium: Estadio Riazor; Attendance: 28,000; Referee: Gilles Veissiere (France)

9 March 2004	Juventus (Italy)	0–1	(Spain) Deportivo La Coruña	Turin, Italy
20:45		Report	Pandiani 12'	Stadium: Stadio Delle Alpi; Attendance: 24,680; Referee: Ľuboš Micheľ (Slovakia)

==== Quarter-final ====
23 March 2004	Milan (Italy)	4–1	(Spain) Deportivo La Coruña	Milan, Italy
20:45 CET (UTC+1)	Kaká 45', 49'; Shevchenko 46'; Pirlo 53'	Report	Pandiani 11'	Stadium: San Siro; Attendance: 60,335; Referee: Valentin Ivanov (Russia)

7 April 2004	Deportivo La Coruña (Spain)	4–0	(Italy) Milan	A Coruña, Spain
20:45 CET (UTC+1)	Pandiani 5'; Valerón 35'; Luque 44'; Fran 76'	Report		Stadium: Estadio Riazor; Attendance: 29,000; Referee: Urs Meier (Switzerland)

==== Semi-final ====
21 April 2004	Porto (Portugal)	0–0	(Spain) Deportivo La Coruña	Porto, Portugal
20:45 CEST (UTC+2)		Report		Stadium: Estádio do Dragão; Attendance: 50,818; Referee: Markus Merk (Germany)

4 May 2004	Deportivo La Coruña (Spain)	0–1	(Portugal) Porto	A Coruña, Spain
20:45 CEST (UTC+2)		Report	Derlei 60' (pen.)	Stadium: Estadio Riazor; Attendance: 34,600; Referee: Pierluigi Collina (Italy)
