= 2002 Copa del Rey final =

2002 Copa del Rey final El Centenariazo
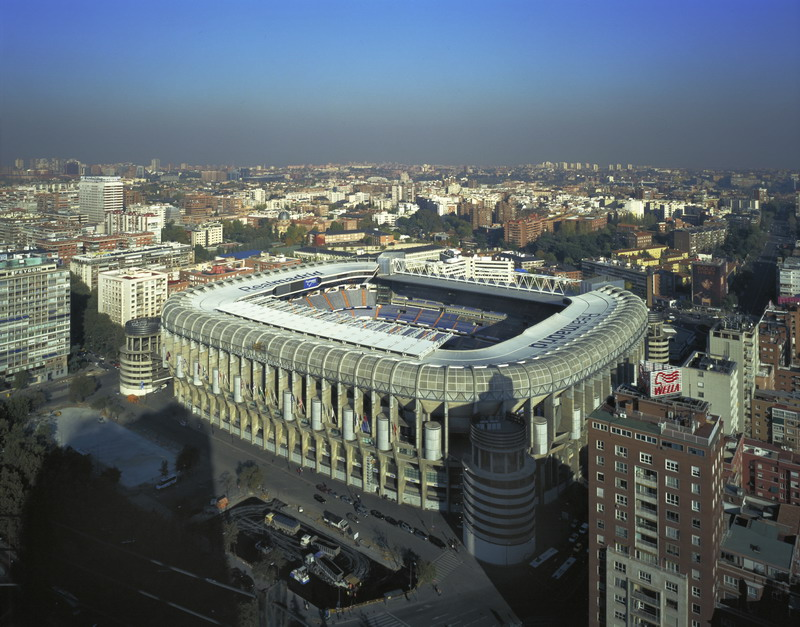
- The final was played at the Santiago Bernabéu Stadium and was on the day of Real Madrid's 100th Anniversary.
- Event: 2001–02 Copa del Rey
| Real Madrid | Deportivo La Coruña |
| 1 | 2 |
- Date: 6 March 2002
- Venue: Santiago Bernabéu Stadium, Madrid
- Referee: Manuel Mejuto González (Spain)
- Attendance: 75,000
- Weather: Clear; 7 °C (45 °F)

The 2002 Copa del Rey final was the 100th final since its establishment. The match took place on 6 March 2002 at the Santiago Bernabéu Stadium, Madrid. The match was contested by Real Madrid and Deportivo de La Coruña, and it was refereed by Manuel Mejuto González. Deportivo lifted the trophy for the second time in their history with a 2–1 victory over Real Madrid. The match is often referred to as El Centenariazo (roughly, 'the centenary blow'), since Real Madrid was celebrating its 100th anniversary as a club on that day.

== Match details ==
6 March 2002
21:00 CET

| Real Madrid | 1–2 | Deportivo La Coruña |
|---|---|---|
| Raúl 58' | Report | Sergio 6'; Tristán 37' |

Santiago Bernabéu, Madrid
Attendance: 75,000
Referee: Manuel Mejuto González

| Real Madrid | Deportivo |

(4-4-2)
| GK | 13 | (Spain) César |
| DF | 2 | (Spain) Míchel Salgado |
| DF | 4 | (Spain) Fernando Hierro (c) | (yellow card) 25' |
| DF | 22 | (Spain) Francisco Pavón | | (substituted off) 46' |
| DF | 3 | (Brazil) Roberto Carlos |
| MF | 10 | (Portugal) Luís Figo | | (substituted off) 83' |
| MF | 24 | (France) Claude Makélélé |
| MF | 6 | (Spain) Iván Helguera | (yellow card) 81' |
| MF | 5 | (France) Zinedine Zidane |
| FW | 7 | (Spain) Raúl |
| FW | 9 | (Spain) Fernando Morientes | | (substituted off) 67' |
Substitutes:
| GK | 1 | (Spain) Iker Casillas |
| MF | 8 | (England) Steve McManaman | | (substituted on) 83' |
| MF | 14 | (Spain) Guti | | (substituted on) 67' |
| MF | 16 | (Brazil) Flávio Conceição |
| MF | 21 | (Argentina) Santiago Solari | (yellow card) 65' | (substituted on) 46' |
Manager:
(Spain) Vicente del Bosque

(4-2-3-1)
| GK | 1 | (Spain) José Francisco Molina | (yellow card) 90' |
| DF | 12 | (Argentina) Lionel Scaloni |
| DF | 5 | (Spain) César |
| DF | 4 | (Morocco) Noureddine Naybet |
| DF | 3 | (Spain) Enrique Romero |
| MF | 16 | (Spain) Sergio |
| MF | 6 | (Brazil) Mauro Silva | (yellow card) 10' |
| MF | 18 | (Spain) Víctor | (yellow card) 31' | (substituted off) 88' |
| MF | 21 | (Spain) Juan Carlos Valerón | | (substituted off) 62' |
| MF | 10 | (Spain) Fran (c) | (yellow card) 70' | (substituted off) 83' |
| FW | 9 | (Spain) Diego Tristán |
Substitutes
| GK | 13 | (Portugal) Nuno |
| DF | 15 | (Spain) Joan Capdevila | | (substituted on) 83' |
| MF | 8 | (Brazil) Djalminha | | (substituted on) 88' |
| MF | 23 | (Argentina) Aldo Duscher | | (substituted on) 62' |
| FW | 7 | (Netherlands) Roy Makaay |
Manager:
(Spain) Javier Irureta
