= Juanmi (footballer, born 1971) =

Spanish footballer (born 1971)

Personal information
- Full name: Juan Miguel García Inglés
- Date of birth: 9 March 1971 (age 55)
- Place of birth: Cartagena, Spain
- Height: 1.81 m (5 ft 11 in)
- Position: Goalkeeper

Youth career
- Cartagena

Senior career*
| Years | Team | Apps | (Gls) |
| 1988 | Cartagena | 2 | (0) |
| 1990–1992 | Real Madrid B | 51 | (0) |
| 1992–1994 | Real Madrid | 0 | (0) |
| 1993–1994 | → Zaragoza (loan) | 15 | (0) |
| 1994–2002 | Zaragoza | 207 | (0) |
| 2002–2003 | Deportivo La Coruña | 27 | (0) |
| 2003–2007 | Murcia | 94 | (0) |
| 2007–2008 | Gimnàstic | 4 | (0) |
| Total | | 400 | (0) |

International career
| 1990 | Spain U20 | 1 | (0) |
| 1992 | Spain U21 | 1 | (0) |
| 1992 | Spain U23 | 1 | (0) |
| 2000 | Spain | 1 | (0) |
- * Club domestic league appearances and goals

Juan Miguel García Inglés (born 9 March 1971), known as Juanmi, is a Spanish former professional footballer who played as a goalkeeper.

He appeared in 267 La Liga matches over 12 seasons, mainly in representation of Zaragoza (nine years).

== Club career ==
Juanmi was born in Cartagena, Region of Murcia. He began his career with local Cartagena FC, playing two Segunda División games in 1987–88 – still a junior – in a relegation-ending campaign. In summer 1990 he signed for Real Madrid, going on to spend two full seasons with the reserves; in 1992–93, he was third-choice for the main squad behind Francisco Buyo and Pedro Jaro.

In the 1993 off-season, Juanmi moved to Real Zaragoza as backup to veteran Andoni Cedrún. After two years as second-choice (although he did manage to total 27 La Liga appearances), he went on to become the Aragonese side's undisputed starter, being instrumental in their 2001 conquest of the Copa del Rey.

In July 2002, following Zaragoza's top-flight relegation, Juanmi signed for Deportivo de La Coruña on a free transfer, initially backing up José Francisco Molina. However, a testicular cancer to the latter made him the starter, and he performed well enough to help the Galicians to eventually finish third.

Subsequently, Juanmi joined Real Murcia CF, alternating between the posts and the bench in four years. After only six games in the 2006–07 season, in a final promotion, he moved to Gimnàstic de Tarragona also of the second division for one year.

Juanmi retired in January 2008 at the age of 36, being immediately named his hometown club's FC Cartagena's goalkeeping coach.

== International career ==
Juanmi earned one cap for Spain, on 26 January 2000, in a match played in his city of birth. He replaced Molina for the final six minutes against Poland in a 3–0 friendly win.

== Career statistics ==
Appearances and goals by club, season and competition
| Club | Season | League | | | National cup | | Europe | | Other | | Total | |
| Club | Season | Division | Apps | Goals | Apps | Goals | Apps | Goals | Apps | Goals | Apps | Goals |
|---|---|---|---|---|---|---|---|---|---|---|---|---|
| Cartagena | 1987–88 | Segunda División | 2 | 0 | 0 | 0 | — | | — | | 2 | 0 |
| Real Madrid B | 1990–91 | Segunda División B | 18 | 0 | — | | — | | 6 (Note: Appearances in Segunda División B play-offs) | 0 | 24 | 0 |
| Real Madrid B | 1991–92 | Segunda División | 33 | 0 | — | | — | | — | | 33 | 0 |
| Real Madrid B | Total | | 51 | 0 | — | | — | | 6 | 0 | 57 | 0 |
| Real Madrid | 1992–93 | La Liga | 0 | 0 | 0 | 0 | 0 | 0 | — | | 0 | 0 |
| Zaragoza (loan) | 1993–94 | La Liga | 15 | 0 | 5 | 0 | — | | — | | 20 | 0 |
| Zaragoza | 1994–95 | La Liga | 12 | 0 | 1 | 0 | 4 (Note: Appearances in UEFA Cup Winners' Cup) | 0 | 0 | 0 | 17 | 0 |
| Zaragoza | 1995–96 | La Liga | 31 | 0 | 3 | 0 | 4 | 0 | 1 (Note: Appearance in UEFA Super Cup) | 0 | 39 | 0 |
| Zaragoza | 1996–97 | La Liga | 27 | 0 | 1 | 0 | — | | — | | 28 | 0 |
| Zaragoza | 1997–98 | La Liga | 31 | 0 | 5 | 0 | — | | — | | 36 | 0 |
| Zaragoza | 1998–99 | La Liga | 25 | 0 | 0 | 0 | — | | — | | 25 | 0 |
| Zaragoza | 1999–2000 | La Liga | 37 | 0 | 6 | 0 | — | | — | | 43 | 0 |
| Zaragoza | 2000–01 | La Liga | 35 | 0 | 6 | 0 | 2 (Note: Appearances in UEFA Cup) | 0 | — | | 43 | 0 |
| Zaragoza | 2001–02 | La Liga | 9 | 0 | 0 | 0 | 1 | 0 | 0 | 0 | 10 | 0 |
| Zaragoza | Total | | 222 | 0 | 27 | 0 | 11 | 0 | 1 | 0 | 261 | 0 |
| Deportivo La Coruña | 2002–03 | La Liga | 27 | 0 | 5 | 0 | 10 (Note: Appearances in UEFA Champions League) | 0 | 0 | 0 | 42 | 0 |
| Deportivo La Coruña | 2003–04 | La Liga | — | | — | | 0 | 0 | — | | 0 | 0 |
| Deportivo La Coruña | Total | | 27 | 0 | 5 | 0 | 10 | 0 | 0 | 0 | 42 | 0 |
| Murcia | 2003–04 | La Liga | 18 | 0 | 1 | 0 | — | | — | | 19 | 0 |
| Murcia | 2004–05 | Segunda División | 29 | 0 | 0 | 0 | — | | — | | 29 | 0 |
| Murcia | 2005–06 | Segunda División | 41 | 0 | 0 | 0 | — | | — | | 41 | 0 |
| Murcia | 2006–07 | Segunda División | 6 | 0 | 1 | 0 | — | | — | | 7 | 0 |
| Murcia | Total | | 94 | 0 | 2 | 0 | — | | — | | 96 | 0 |
| Gimnàstic | 2007–08 | Segunda División | 4 | 0 | 1 | 0 | — | | — | | 5 | 0 |
| Career total | | | 400 | 0 | 35 | 0 | 21 | 0 | 7 | 0 | 463 | 0 |

== Honours ==
Zaragoza

- Copa del Rey: 1993–94, 2000–01
- UEFA Cup Winners' Cup: 1994–95

Deportivo

- Supercopa de España: 2002
