= Jorge Andrade =

Portuguese footballer (born 1978)

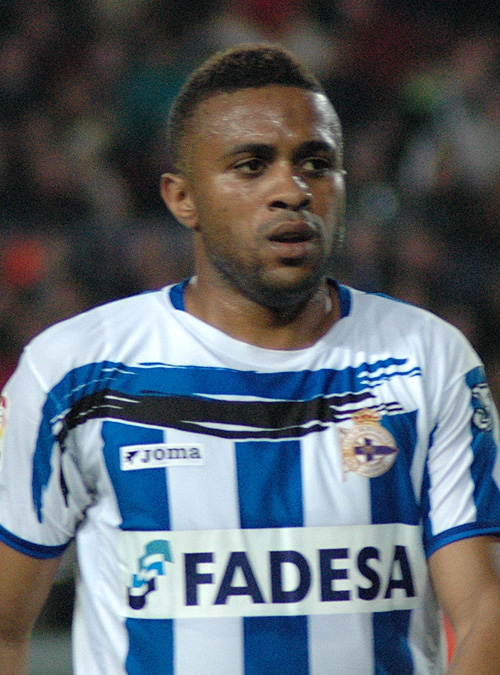
- Andrade with Deportivo La Coruña in 2007

Personal information
- Full name: Jorge Manuel Almeida Gomes de Andrade
- Date of birth: 9 April 1978 (age 48)
- Place of birth: Lisbon, Portugal
- Height: 1.84 m (6 ft 0 in)
- Position: Centre-back

Youth career
- 1986–1997: Estrela Amadora

Senior career*
Years	Team	Apps	(Gls)
1997–2000	Estrela Amadora	53	(3)
2000–2002	Porto	52	(3)
2002–2007	Deportivo La Coruña	123	(2)
2007–2009	Juventus	4	(0)
Total		232	(8)

International career
1998	Portugal U20	1	(0)
1999	Portugal U21	1	(0)
2000	Portugal B	2	(0)
2001–2007	Portugal	51	(3)

Managerial career
- 2015–2016: Atlético (assistant)
- 2016: Atlético
- 2016: Oriental
- 2019: Vitória Setúbal (assistant)
Medal record
Men's football
Representing Portugal
UEFA European Championship
Runner-up	2004 Portugal
- * Club domestic league appearances and goals

Jorge Manuel Almeida Gomes de Andrade OIH (Portuguese pronunciation: [ˈʒɔɾʒɨ ɐ̃ˈdɾaðɨ]; born 9 April 1978) is a Portuguese former professional footballer who played as a centre-back.

After playing two years with Porto, he went on to represent Deportivo de La Coruña (169 official appearances in five seasons) and Juventus, appearing rarely for the latter club due to injury.

Andrade earned more than 50 caps for Portugal, representing the country at the 2002 World Cup and Euro 2004 and helping it finish second in the latter tournament.

== Club career ==
=== Early career ===
Andrade was born in Lisbon. He made his professional debut with his hometown club Estrela da Amadora in 1997, helping it to two consecutive eighth Primeira Liga places as well as participation in the 1998 UEFA Intertoto Cup. He immediately caught the eye, and after that was on the move north to Porto, being the team's most used player in the 2001–02 edition of the UEFA Champions League at 15 matches (of a possible 16) as they reached the second group phase in the competition.

=== Deportivo ===
After Portugal's unsuccessful 2002 World Cup campaign, Andrade joined Spain's Deportivo de La Coruña in a move that cost the Galician side €12 million with the possibility of being increased to €13 million (goalkeeper Nuno Espírito Santo was also part of the deal, for €3 million). He appeared in 11 La Liga games in his debut season, barred by César Martín and Noureddine Naybet, but was an undisputed first-choice when healthy in the following years.

On 21 April 2004, during a Champions League semi-finals fixture against his former team Porto, Andrade was sent off by Markus Merk for a kick on Deco; the gesture was of a friendly nature, but the referee was eluded by it, and immediately gave the defender his marching orders. He was forced to serve a one-match ban.

=== Juventus ===
Andrade signed for Juventus in summer 2007, for approximately €10 million. In a Serie A match against Roma on 23 September, he broke his left patella and missed the rest of the season.

In the team's 2008 pre-season, Andrade suffered the same injury and missed the entire 2008–09. In a press release dated 7 August, Juventus stated:

"On 9 July 2008, during a training session at Pinzolo, the player Jorge Manuel Almeida Gomes de Andrade was the victim of another serious injury to his left knee (relapse of the fracture of the rotula) operated twice in the past season. A new osteosynthesis operation was thus needed, with the post-surgery prognosis being a number of months. Given the impossibility for the player to recover to play professionally, the company has proceeded to fully write down the residual book value of the player's registration rights with a negative effect on the 2007–08 financial year for €6.8 million."

That was the third in a year and the fourth left knee surgery Andrade had in his career. The Turin-based club wrote off his salary as well as part of the transfer fee for the fiscal year, though he stated he hoped to return playing at the highest level.

On 8 April 2009, Juventus and Andrade reached an agreement and the player's remaining contract was cancelled, leaving him free to find another team. After being released he went on trial with Málaga, but was not offered a deal eventually; in early February 2010, he was scheduled to undergo a trial at Toronto FC in Canada, but failed to report.

== International career ==
Andrade made his debut for Portugal on 25 April 2001, playing the full 90 minutes in a 4–0 friendly defeat in France, and was part of the nation's squads at the 2002 FIFA World Cup and UEFA Euro 2004, partnering Ricardo Carvalho for the runners-up at the latter and eventually scoring three goals in 51 games, the first being in a 5–1 win against Angola on 14 November 2001, an exhibition game marred by violence. In Euro 2004, held on home soil, he also put one in his own net in a 2–1 victory over the Netherlands in the semi-finals.

Andrade missed Portugal's fourth-place finish at the 2006 FIFA World Cup, having had knee surgery in March that year. He appeared in five matches during the Euro 2008 qualifying campaign, his last international occurring on 22 August when he started in a 1–1 draw in Armenia.

== Coaching career ==
On 9 April 2015, Andrade was named assistant to Pedro Hipólito at hometown club Atlético Clube de Portugal, then struggling in the Segunda Liga. The following 21 February, he was interim manager for the match away to Porto B, losing by a single goal.

Andrade took his first outright job on 21 March 2016 at fellow capital team Oriental, occupying a precarious position in the same league. In May, four of his players were investigated for allegedly taking bribes to throw games, and the campaign ended with relegation.

In February 2019, Andrade was appointed assistant to Sandro Mendes at Vitória de Setúbal. He stood down in August, for family reasons.

Andrade returned to Estrela on 4 December 2021, as part of the club's football structure.

== Personal life ==
Andrade, along with fellow Portuguese internationals Miguel, Nani and Nélson, had descent from the Cape Verde islands, previously a Portuguese colony. He visited the archipelago in 2006, and did some work with grassroots football during his stay.

== Career statistics ==
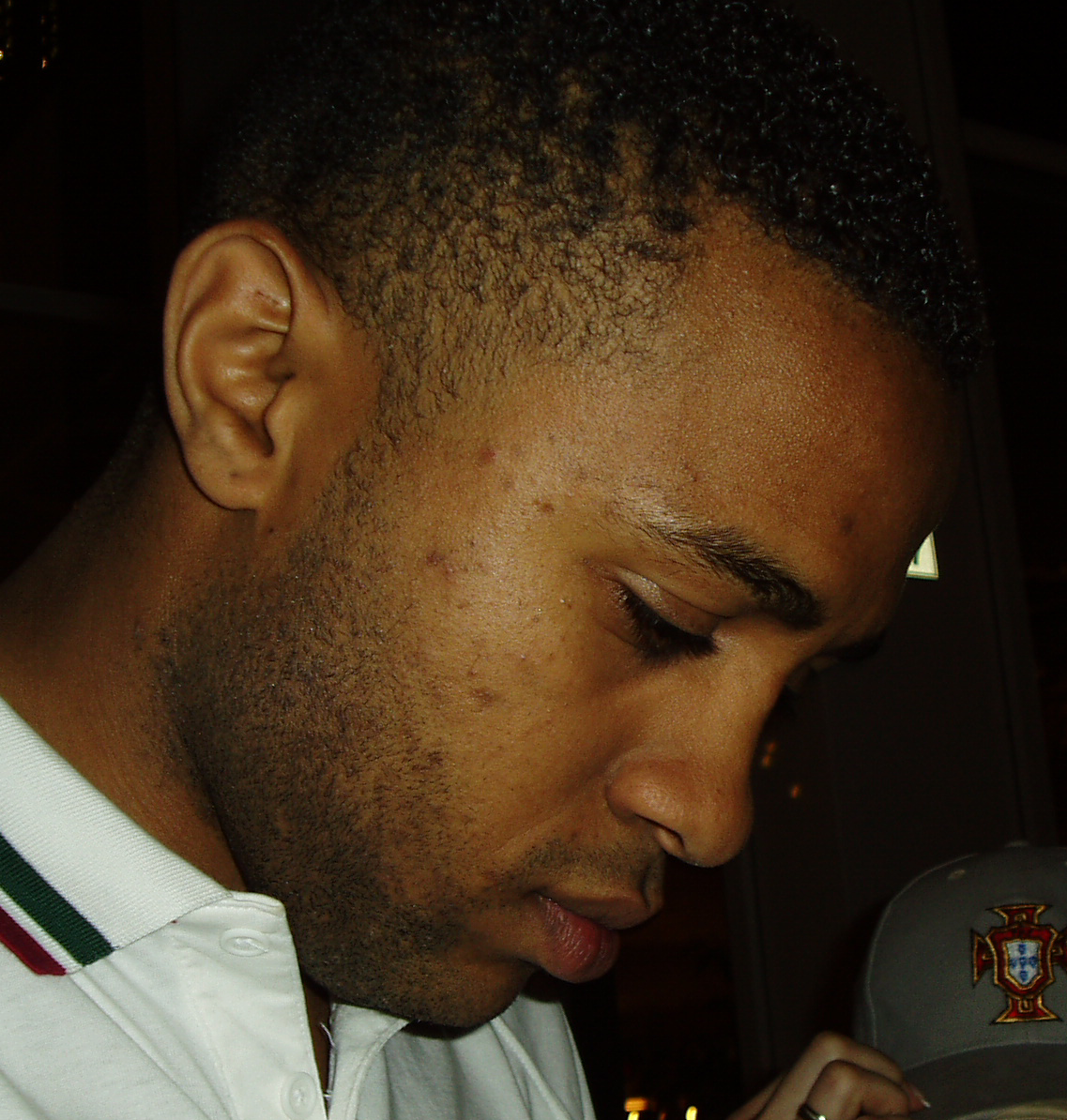
Andrade in 2006

=== Club ===
Appearances and goals by club, season and competition
Club	Season	League			Cup		Europe		Other		Total	
Club	Season	Division	Apps	Goals	Apps	Goals	Apps	Goals	Apps	Goals	Apps	Goals
Estrela Amadora	1997–98	Primeira Divisão	5	1	1	0	—		—		6	1
Estrela Amadora	1998–99	Primeira Divisão	17	2	2	0	2	0	0	0	21	2
Estrela Amadora	1999–00	Primeira Divisão	31	0	1	0	—		—		32	0
Estrela Amadora	Total		53	3	4	0	2	0	0	0	59	3
Porto	2000–01	Primeira Liga	20	1	6	0	4	0	2	0	32	1
Porto	2001–02	Primeira Liga	32	2	4	0	15	0	1	1	52	3
Porto	Total		52	3	10	0	19	0	3	1	84	4
Deportivo	2002–03	La Liga	11	0	5	0	4	0	1	0	21	0
Deportivo	2003–04	La Liga	37	0	2	0	13	0	0	0	52	0
Deportivo	2004–05	La Liga	35	1	—		7	0	—		42	1
Deportivo	2005–06	La Liga	18	1	4	0	6	3	—		28	4
Deportivo	2006–07	La Liga	22	0	4	0	—		—		26	0
Deportivo	Total		123	2	15	0	30	3	1	0	169	5
Juventus	2007–08	Serie A	4	0	1	0	—		—		5	0
Juventus	2008–09	Serie A	0	0	0	0	0	0	—		0	0
Juventus	Total		4	0	1	0	0	0	—		5	0
Career total			232	8	30	0	51	3	4	1	317	12

=== International ===
Appearances and goals by national team and year
National team	Year	Apps	Goals
Portugal	2001	2	1
Portugal	2002	6	0
Portugal	2003	9	1
Portugal	2004	16	0
Portugal	2005	10	1
Portugal	2006	2	0
Portugal	2007	6	0
Total		51	3

Scores and results list Portugal's goal tally first, score column indicates score after each Andrade goal.

List of international goals scored by Jorge Andrade
No.	Date	Venue	Opponent	Score	Result	Competition
1	14 November 2001	Estádio José Alvalade (1956), Lisbon, Portugal	Angola	3–1	5–1	Friendly
2	10 June 2003	Estádio Nacional, Lisbon, Portugal	Bolivia	1–0	4–0	Friendly
3	3 September 2005	Estádio do Algarve, Faro, Portugal	Luxembourg	1–0	6–0	2006 World Cup qualification

== Honours ==
Porto

- Taça de Portugal: 2000–01
- Supertaça Cândido de Oliveira: 2001; runner-up: 2000

Deportivo

- Supercopa de España: 2002

Portugal

- UEFA European Championship runner-up: 2004

Orders

- Medal of Merit, Order of the Immaculate Conception of Vila Viçosa (House of Braganza)
