= 2002 Supercopa de España =

| Deportivo La Coruña | Valencia |
| 4 | 0 |
- on aggregate

First leg
| Deportivo La Coruña | Valencia |
| 3 | 0 |
- Date: 18 August 2002
- Venue: Riazor, A Coruña
- Referee: Manuel Mejuto González
- Attendance: 28,000

Second leg
| Valencia | Deportivo La Coruña |
| 0 | 1 |
- Date: 25 August 2002
- Venue: Mestalla, Valencia
- Referee: Eduardo Iturralde González
- Attendance: 32,000

The 2002 Supercopa de España was two-leg Spanish football matches played on 18 August and 25 August 2002. It contested by Deportivo La Coruña, who were Spanish Cup winners in 2001–02, and Valencia, who won the 2001–02 Spanish League.

Deportivo La Coruña were the winners.

== Match details ==
=== First leg ===
18 August 2002
21:45 CET

| Deportivo La Coruña | 3–0 | Valencia |
|---|---|---|
| Valerón 12'; Víctor 21'; Naybet 31' |

Riazor, A Coruña
Attendance: 28,000
Referee: Mejuto González

| Deportivo | Valencia |

| GK | 1 | (Spain) José Molina |
| RB | 12 | (Argentina) Lionel Scaloni |
| CB | 5 | (Spain) César | | (substituted off) 71' |
| CB | 4 | (Morocco) Noureddine Naybet |
| LB | 3 | (Spain) Enrique Romero | (yellow card) 38' |
| DM | 6 | (Brazil) Mauro Silva | (yellow card) 8' |
| DM | 16 | (Spain) Sergio |
| RM | 18 | (Spain) Víctor | (yellow card) 90+2' |
| AM | 21 | (Spain) Juan Carlos Valerón | | (substituted off) 79' |
| LM | 10 | (Spain) Fran (c) | | (substituted off) 67' |
| CF | 7 | (Netherlands) Roy Makaay |
Substitutes:
| MF | 23 | (Argentina) Aldo Duscher | | (substituted on) 67' |
| DF | 14 | (Portugal) Jorge Andrade | | (substituted on) 71' |
| MF | 8 | (Brazil) Djalminha | | (substituted on) 79' |
Manager:
(Spain) Javier Irureta

| GK | 1 | (Spain) Santiago Cañizares (c) |
| RB | 23 | (Spain) Curro Torres | (yellow card) 90+2' |
| CB | 4 | (Argentina) Roberto Ayala |
| CB | 2 | (Argentina) Mauricio Pellegrino |
| LB | 15 | (Italy) Amedeo Carboni | (yellow card) 7' |
| DM | 22 | (Uruguay) Gonzalo de los Santos | (yellow card) 20' | (substituted off) 46' |
| DM | 12 | (Spain) Carlos Marchena | | (substituted off) 75' |
| RM | 19 | (Spain) Francisco Rufete | | (substituted off) 46' |
| AM | 21 | (Argentina) Pablo Aimar |
| LM | 14 | (Spain) Vicente |
| CF | 10 | (Spain) Miguel Ángel Angulo |
Substitutes:
| MF | 8 | (Spain) Rubén Baraja | (yellow card) 90+1' | (substituted on) 46' |
| FW | 7 | (Norway) John Carew | | (substituted on) 46' |
| FW | 11 | (Spain) Juan Sánchez | | (substituted on) 75' |
Manager:
(Spain) Rafael Benítez

=== Second leg ===
25 August 2002
22:00 CET

| Valencia | 0–1 | Deportivo La Coruña |
|---|---|---|
| | | Víctor 90' |

Mestalla, Valencia
Attendance: 32,000
Referee: Iturralde González

| Valencia | Deportivo |

| GK | 1 | (Spain) Santiago Cañizares (c) |
| RB | 23 | (Spain) Curro Torres |
| CB | 4 | (Argentina) Roberto Ayala | (red card) 2' |
| CB | 2 | (Argentina) Mauricio Pellegrino |
| LB | 3 | (Brazil) Fábio Aurélio | (yellow card) 30' |
| RM | 21 | (Argentina) Pablo Aimar | (yellow card) 48' | (substituted off) 75' |
| CM | 8 | (Spain) Rubén Baraja |
| CM | 12 | (Spain) Carlos Marchena | (yellow card) 35' | (substituted off) 46' |
| LM | 14 | (Spain) Vicente | | (substituted off) 70' |
| CF | 9 | (Spain) Salva |
| CF | 10 | (Spain) Miguel Ángel Angulo |
Substitutes:
| MF | 19 | (Spain) Francisco Rufete | | (substituted on) 46' |
| DF | 15 | (Italy) Amedeo Carboni | | (substituted on) 70' |
| FW | 11 | (Spain) Juan Sánchez | | (substituted on) 75' |
Manager:
(Spain) Rafael Benítez

| GK | 1 | (Spain) José Molina |
| RB | 12 | (Argentina) Lionel Scaloni |
| CB | 5 | (Spain) César |
| CB | 4 | (Morocco) Noureddine Naybet |
| LB | 3 | (Spain) Enrique Romero |
| DM | 6 | (Brazil) Mauro Silva | (yellow card) 34' |
| DM | 16 | (Spain) Sergio |
| RM | 18 | (Spain) Víctor |
| AM | 21 | (Spain) Juan Carlos Valerón | | (substituted off) 73' |
| LM | 10 | (Spain) Fran (c) | (yellow card) 12' | (substituted off) 70' |
| CF | 7 | (Netherlands) Roy Makaay | | (substituted off) 85' |
Substitutes:
| DF | 15 | (Spain) Joan Capdevila | | (substituted on) 70' |
| MF | 23 | (Argentina) Aldo Duscher | | (substituted on) 73' |
| FW | 17 | (Uruguay) Walter Pandiani | | (substituted on) 85' |
Manager:
(Spain) Javier Irureta

== See also ==
- 2002–03 La Liga
- 2002–03 Copa del Rey
- 2002–03 Deportivo de La Coruña season
- 2002–03 Valencia CF season
