= Roy Makaay =

Dutch footballer (born 1975)

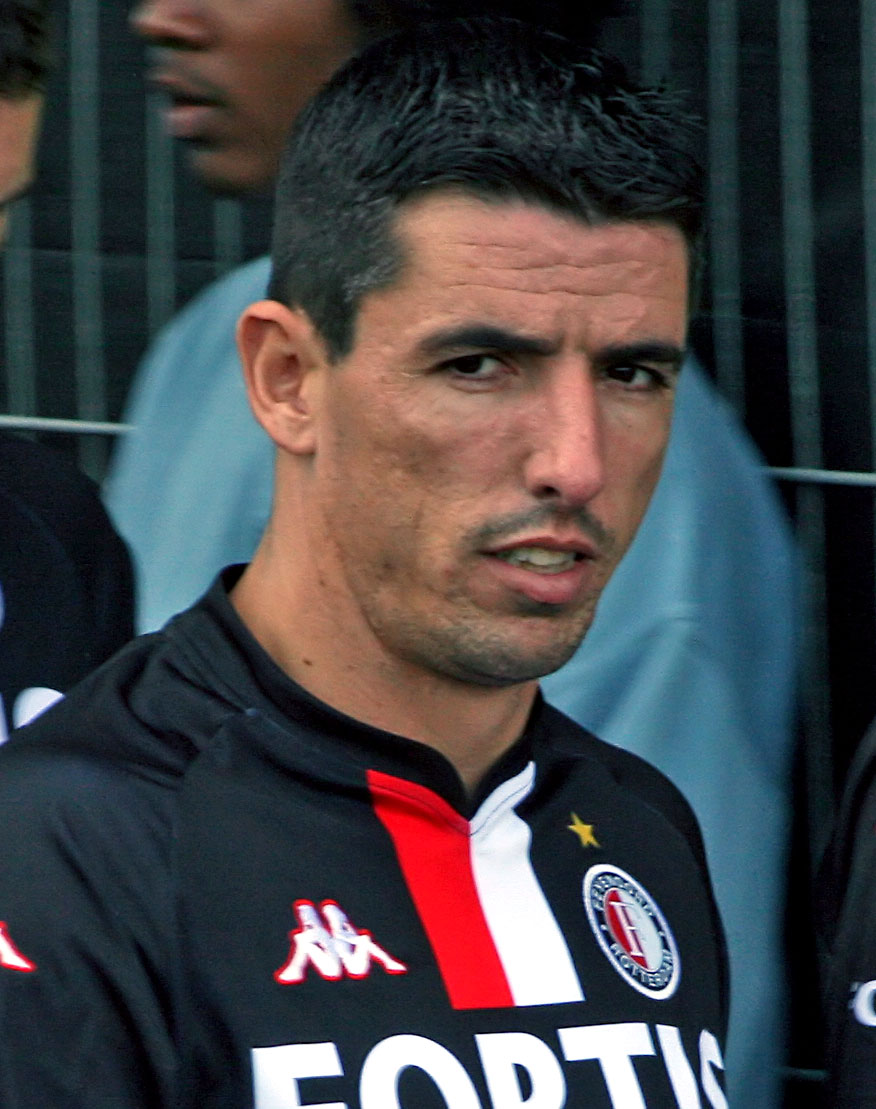
- Makaay with Feyenoord in 2007

Personal information
- Full name: Roy Rudolphus Antonius Makaay
- Date of birth: 9 March 1975 (age 51)
- Place of birth: Wijchen, Netherlands
- Height: 1.88 m (6 ft 2 in)
- Position: Forward

Youth career
- SC Woezik
- DIOSA
- Blauw Wit Nijmegen

Senior career*
Years	Team	Apps	(Gls)
1993–1997	Vitesse	109	(42)
1997–1999	Tenerife	72	(21)
1999–2003	Deportivo La Coruña	133	(79)
2003–2007	Bayern Munich	129	(78)
2007–2010	Feyenoord	83	(36)
Total		526	(256)

International career
1994–1998	Netherlands U21	27	(15)
1996–2005	Netherlands	43	(6)
2008	Netherlands Olympic (O.P.)	3	(2)
Medal record
Men's football
Representing Netherlands
UEFA European Championship
Bronze medal – third place	2004 Portugal
- * Club domestic league appearances and goals

Roy Rudolphus Antonius Makaay (born 9 March 1975) is a Dutch professional football coach and former player. As a forward, he was known for his goal-scoring ability as a result of his "aerial prowess and quick drives to the net where he can put the ball away with either foot."

He began his career at Vitesse and Tenerife before moving to Deportivo de La Coruña in 1999 and helping the side to their first La Liga title in his first season there. He also won the Copa del Rey in 2002 and the following season was given the European Golden Boot for a 29-goal haul. He remains the club's all-time leading goalscorer. He then moved to Bayern Munich for a then club record €18.75 million, where he picked up the nickname Das Phantom (The Phantom), for his ability to score out of nowhere, as well as Tormaschine (goal machine), for his consistent ability to find the back of the net. After winning two consecutive Bundesliga and DFB-Pokal doubles at Bayern, he returned to the Netherlands with Feyenoord in 2007.

A full international from 1996 to 2005, Makaay scored six international goals in 43 matches, despite competition for a place in the national team. He competed with the Dutch side at two UEFA European Championships and the 2008 Olympics.

== Club career ==
=== Early career ===
He was first recognized as a talented striker while playing for Vitesse in the mid-1990s and honed his skills in the Spanish First Division with Tenerife and later with Deportivo La Coruña.

=== Deportivo La Coruña ===
In July 1999, Makaay was signed by Deportivo La Coruña from Tenerife for a transfer fee of Pts 10 million. He made his league debut on 22 August 1999 in the opening game of the season, where he scored a hat-trick to give Deportivo a 4–1 home victory over Alavés. Makaay scored a total of 22 goals in 36 appearances in the 1999–2000 season, including braces against Barcelona, Real Oviedo, and Atlético Madrid, as well as adding one in their final match against Espanyol to inspire the Galician club to their first La Liga title.

Makaay was an unused substitute as Dépor reached the 2002 Copa del Rey Final on 6 March 2002; Deportivo lifted the trophy for the second time in their history with a 2–1 victory over Real Madrid.

He was the European Golden Boot winner for the 2002–03 season with his 29 goals making him the top scorer in Europe.

His first encounter with Bayern Munich came during the 2002–03 UEFA Champions League season when he scored a hat-trick at the Olympiastadion in Munich, in Deportivo's 3–2 win over the Bavarians on 19 September 2002.

=== Bayern Munich ===
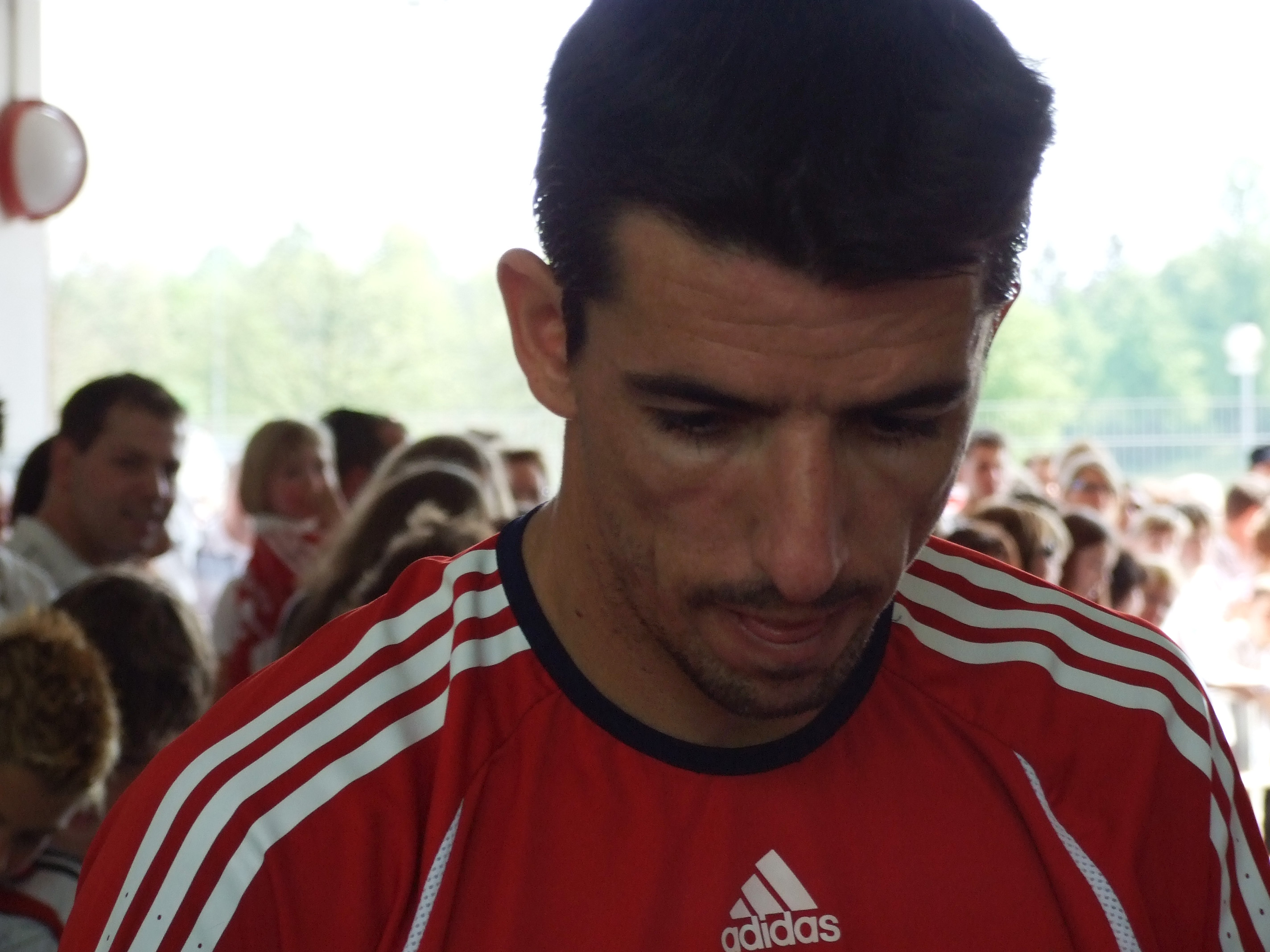
Makaay at Bayern Munich in April 2007

Bayern Munich kept a close eye on Makaay throughout the whole season and finally beat off stiff challenges from Manchester United and Chelsea to get their man. A then club record fee of €18.75 million was paid to Deportivo in the summer 2003 to sign him. He scored 78 Bundesliga and 17 UEFA Champions League goals during his four seasons at Bayern.

On 29 September 2004, he scored a hat-trick in a 4–0 Champions League group stage win over Ajax, putting him in a select group of players to have scored a Champions League hat-trick at two clubs.

On 21 August 2006, Makaay scored Bayern Munich's 3,000th Bundesliga goal. On 31 March 2007, he scored his 100th Bayern Munich goal in the game against Schalke 04. It was his 75th Bundesliga goal and 100th competitive goal since joining Bayern Munich in 2003.

On 7 March 2007, Makaay scored the quickest goal in Champions League history, finding the net after just 10.12 seconds to help Bayern overturn a first-leg deficit and put Real Madrid out of the competition at the round of sixteen. Madrid kicked off but Roberto Carlos failed to control the backpass, allowing Bayern's Hasan Salihamidžić to steal the ball and feed it to Makaay who tapped it past goalkeeper Iker Casillas.

=== Feyenoord ===
Makaay returned to the Netherlands for the 2007–08 season, when Feyenoord signed him to a three-year deal worth €5 million in June 2007. Makaay's decision to leave was influenced by Bayern Munich's decision to sign forwards Luca Toni and Miroslav Klose.

In his first season at Feyenoord, Makaay was instrumental in leading the club to their eleventh KNVB Cup title, scoring 7 goals in 5 matches.

Makaay retired at the end of the 2009–10 season, scoring a hat-trick in his last match against Heerenveen.

== International career ==
Makaay scored 15 times for the Dutch U-21 national team, which was a record shared with Arnold Bruggink, before Klaas-Jan Huntelaar eclipsed their tally in 2006.

His international caps for the Dutch national team were limited due to players such as Patrick Kluivert, Dennis Bergkamp and Ruud van Nistelrooy. Makaay was, however, capped for his country at Euro 2000 and Euro 2004. In the latter tournament, he scored against Latvia in the first round.

In 2008, Makaay was chosen as one of three overage players to represent the Netherlands at the Olympics, where he captained the side to a quarter-final defeat to eventual champions Argentina.

== Coaching career ==
After his retirement he was named as a youth coach for the academy of Feyenoord. Alongside this, he was also working as forward coach for the club, both with the first team and youth teams.

In May 2013, the club confirmed that – after as successful year with the C1 team – Makaay would take charge of the U19s for the upcoming season.

On 18 November 2021, he was named first-team coach to Giovanni van Bronckhorst at Rangers.

On 23 March 2023, he was named head coach of the Bayern Munich World Squad.

== Personal life ==
Makaay is of Indonesian descent.

== Career statistics ==
=== Club ===
Appearances and goals by club, season and competition
Club	Season	League			Cup		Europe		Total	
Club	Season	Division	Apps	Goals	Apps	Goals	Apps	Goals	Apps	Goals
Vitesse	1993–94	Eredivisie	10	1	0	0	0	0	10	1
Vitesse	1994–95	Eredivisie	34	11	0	0	–		34	11
Vitesse	1995–96	Eredivisie	31	11	4	1	–		35	12
Vitesse	1996–97	Eredivisie	34	19	5	3	–		39	22
Vitesse	Total		109	42	9	4	0	0	118	46
Tenerife	1997–98	La Liga	36	7	0	0	–		36	7
Tenerife	1998–99	La Liga	36	14	2	0	–		38	14
Tenerife	Total		72	21	2	0	0	0	74	21
Deportivo La Coruña	1999–2000	La Liga	36	22	2	1	3	3	41	26
Deportivo La Coruña	2000–01	La Liga	29	16	0	0	6	2	35	18
Deportivo La Coruña	2001–02	La Liga	30	12	2	1	9	1	41	14
Deportivo La Coruña	2002–03	La Liga	38	29	5	1	11	9	54	39
Deportivo La Coruña	Total		133	79	9	3	29	15	171	97
Bayern Munich	2003–04	Bundesliga	32	23	4	2	8	6	44	31
Bayern Munich	2004–05	Bundesliga	33	22	5	5	8	7	46	34
Bayern Munich	2005–06	Bundesliga	31	17	5	0	8	2	44	19
Bayern Munich	2006–07	Bundesliga	33	16	3	0	8	2	44	18
Bayern Munich	Total		129	78	17	7	32	17	178	102
Feyenoord	2007–08	Eredivisie	28	13	5	7	–		33	20
Feyenoord	2008–09	Eredivisie	31	16	3	4	6	0	40	20
Feyenoord	2009–10	Eredivisie	24	7	4	3	0	0	28	10
Feyenoord	Total		83	36	12	14	6	0	101	50
Career total			526	256	49	28	67	32	642	316

=== International ===
Appearances and goals by national team and year
National team	Year	Apps	Goals
Netherlands	1996	1	0
Netherlands	1997	1	0
Netherlands	1998	0	0
Netherlands	1999	0	0
Netherlands	2000	7	0
Netherlands	2001	6	0
Netherlands	2002	5	2
Netherlands	2003	6	1
Netherlands	2004	15	3
Netherlands	2005	2	0
Total		43	6

Scores and results list the Netherlands goal tally first, score column indicates score after each Makaay goal.

List of international goals scored by Roy Makaay
No.	Date	Venue	Opponent	Score	Result	Competition
1	19 May 2002	CMGI Field, Foxborough, United States	United States	1–0	2–0	Friendly
2	16 October 2002	Ernst-Happel-Stadion, Vienna, Austria	Austria	3–0	3–0	UEFA Euro 2004 qualifying
3	20 August 2003	King Baudouin Stadium, Brussels, Belgium	Belgium	1–1	1–1	Friendly
4	28 April 2004	Philips Stadion, Eindhoven, Netherlands	Greece	1–0	4–0	Friendly
5	1 June 2004	Stade Olympique de la Pontaise, Lausanne, Switzerland	Faroe Islands	2–0	3–0	Friendly
6	23 June 2004	Estádio Municipal de Braga, Braga, Portugal	Latvia	3–0	3–0	UEFA Euro 2004

=== Managerial ===
Team	From	To	Record				
Team	From	To	G	W	D	L	Win %
Feyenoord U19	1 July 2013	30 June 2015	52	28	11	13	53.85
Feyenoord U21	1 July 2016	30 October 2019	37	19	7	11	51.35
Total			89	47	18	24	52.81

== Honours ==
Deportivo La Coruña

- La Liga: 1999–2000
- Copa del Rey: 2001–02
- Supercopa de España: 2000, 2002

Bayern Munich

- Bundesliga: 2004–05, 2005–06
- DFB-Pokal: 2004–05, 2005–06
- DFB-Ligapokal: 2004

Feyenoord

- KNVB Cup: 2007–08

Individual

- Pichichi Trophy: 2002–03
- European Golden Shoe: 2002–03
- ESM Team of the Year: 2002–03
- FIFA XI (Reserve): 2002
