= Iván Pérez (footballer, born 1976) =

Spanish footballer

Personal information
- Full name: Iván Pérez Muñoz
- Date of birth: 29 January 1976 (age 50)
- Place of birth: Madrid, Spain
- Height: 1.73 m (5 ft 8 in)
- Position: Forward

Youth career
- Real Madrid

Senior career*
Years	Team	Apps	(Gls)
1993–1997	Real Madrid B	31	(7)
1996–1997	Real Madrid	3	(1)
1996–1997	→ Extremadura (loan)	16	(0)
1997–1999	Betis	27	(1)
1999	Bordeaux	10	(3)
1999–2004	Deportivo La Coruña	5	(0)
2001	→ Numancia (loan)	13	(2)
2001–2002	→ Leganés (loan)	32	(3)
2004–2005	Girona	20	(2)
Total		157	(19)

International career
1991–1992	Spain U16	18	(13)
1992	Spain U17	4	(2)
1993–1994	Spain U18	8	(1)
1996–1998	Spain U21	8	(5)
1997	Spain U23	2	(0)
Medal record
Representing Spain
UEFA European Under-21 Championship
Winner	1998 Romania
- * Club domestic league appearances and goals

Iván Pérez Muñoz (born 29 January 1976) is a Spanish former professional footballer who played as a forward.

He amassed La Liga totals of 64 games and four goals over seven seasons, representing five clubs including Real Madrid and Deportivo.

== Club career ==
Coming from Real Madrid's youth system, Madrid-born Pérez became a professional in 1994 with the reserves. He made his first appearance with the first team the next season.

Whilst under contract, Pérez had a loan spell with CF Extremadura, leaving in summer 1997 to sign for Real Betis. He later played briefly in the French Ligue 1 with FC Girondins de Bordeaux, before joining Deportivo de La Coruña on a five-year contract in 1999.

With the Galicians, Pérez was a member of the 1999–2000 championship-winning squad, but only featured in three La Liga matches throughout the campaign, totalling just ten appearances over the course of three seasons in spite of consistently being his side's top scorer in preseason. He scored his only goal on 9 March 2000, in a 2–1 home win against Arsenal in the round of 16 of the UEFA Cup after a 5–1 loss in England.

Following loan stints at CD Numancia and CD Leganés, Pérez retired aged 29 after one year with Segunda División B club Girona FC.

== International career ==
Pérez scored the only goal in the 1998 UEFA European Under-21 Championship final, as Spain beat Greece. He also found the net in the quarter-finals of the tournament.

== Personal life ==
Pérez was the younger brother of another footballer, Alfonso Pérez. Both began their careers with Real Madrid, and played together for two seasons at Betis.

== Honours ==
Deportivo

- La Liga: 1999–2000

Spain U21

- UEFA European Under-21 Championship: 1998
