= Joan Capdevila =

Spanish footballer (born 1978)

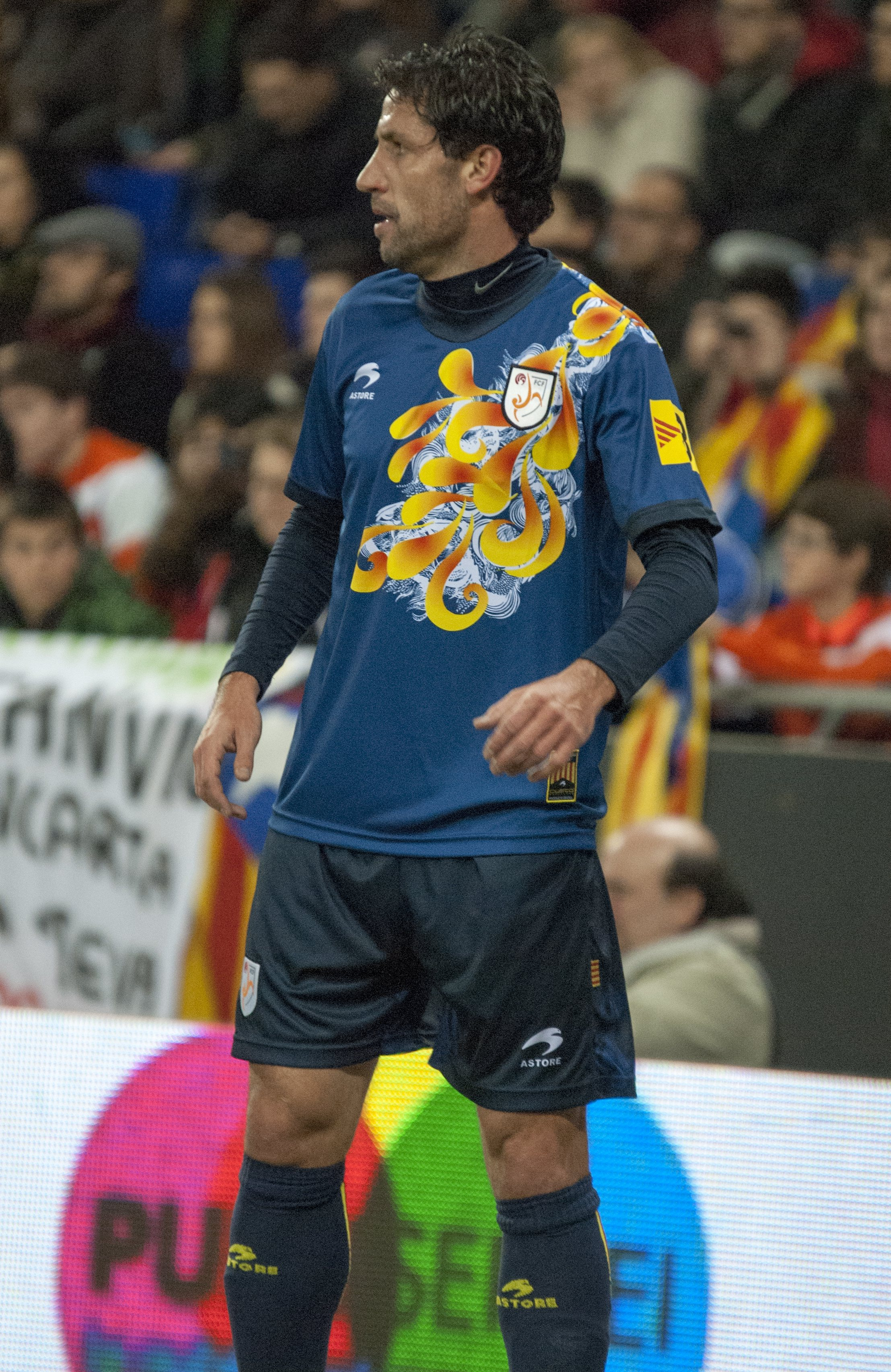
- Capdevila in action for Catalonia in 2013

Personal information
- Full name: Joan Capdevila Méndez
- Date of birth: 3 February 1978 (age 48)
- Place of birth: Tàrrega, Spain
- Height: 1.82 m (6 ft 0 in)
- Position: Left-back

Youth career
- Tàrrega
- 1996–1997: Espanyol

Senior career*
Years	Team	Apps	(Gls)
1995–1996	Tàrrega	33	(3)
1997–1998	Espanyol B	45	(4)
1998–1999	Espanyol	29	(4)
1999–2000	Atlético Madrid	31	(2)
2000–2007	Deportivo La Coruña	179	(15)
2007–2011	Villarreal	140	(15)
2011–2012	Benfica	5	(0)
2012–2014	Espanyol	31	(0)
2014	NorthEast United	12	(0)
2015	Lierse	4	(0)
2016–2017	Santa Coloma	2	(2)
Total		511	(45)

International career
1998–2000	Spain U21	13	(0)
2000	Spain U23	4	(0)
2002–2011	Spain	60	(4)
2002–2013	Catalonia	10	(0)
Medal record
Representing Spain
FIFA World Cup
Winner	2010 South Africa
UEFA European Championship
Winner	2008 Austria-Switzerland
Summer Olympics
Silver medal – second place	2000 Sydney	Team
- * Club domestic league appearances and goals

Joan Capdevila Méndez (Catalan pronunciation: [ʒuˈaŋ ˌkabdəˈβilə]; born 3 February 1978) is a Spanish former professional footballer who played as a left-back.

Over 15 seasons in La Liga, he amassed totals of 410 matches and 36 goals, mainly for Deportivo and Villarreal. In a 21-year senior career, he also played in Portugal, India, Belgium and Andorra.

Capdevila won 60 caps for Spain, being a member of the squads that won Euro 2008 and the 2010 World Cup.

== Club career ==
=== Early years and Deportivo ===
Born in Tàrrega, Lleida, Catalonia, and a product of Espanyol's youth system, Capdevila started playing football as a forward, and he made his debut for its first team during the 1998–99 season in a 2–2 La Liga draw at Athletic Bilbao. He joined Atlético Madrid the following year.

After the Colchoneros' relegation, Capdevila signed with Deportivo de La Coruña in the summer of 2000, and would be a regular fixture in the team as left-back, first competing with Enrique Romero then as the undisputed first choice. On 16 September 2006, he scored twice as the Galicians overcame Villarreal 2–0 at the Riazor Stadium.

=== Villarreal ===
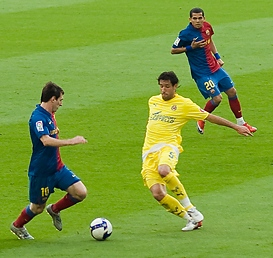
Capdevila (right) attempting a tackle on Lionel Messi

For the 2007–08 campaign, Capdevila moved to Villarreal on a three-year deal, and played in all the league games except two for a side that finished runners-up, achieving direct qualification for the UEFA Champions League. He produced similar numbers in his second year, bettering his goal total in the process (five).

In the 2009–10 season, with no real competition for his position, Capdevila continued to figure prominently, only missing one league match – the defender added another five goals, but his team could not qualify for the UEFA Europa League this time after finishing seventh. On 6 December 2009 he scored twice in a 3–2 home win against Getafe, precisely the side that prevented the Valencians from reaching that achievement, even though they were later reinstated at the expense of Mallorca.

Capdevila faced stiff competition from José Catalá midway through 2010–11, even being relegated to the bench on occasion. He did finish the campaign with more than 40 official appearances, including nine in Villarreal's Europa League semi-final run, where he scored in a 3–2 home victory over eventual winners Porto (7–4 aggregate loss).

=== Benfica ===
On 21 July 2011, aged 33, Capdevila moved abroad for the first time, joining Benfica of Portugal on a two-year contract. On 20 August, he made his official debut in a 3–1 Primeira Liga defeat of Feirense at the Estádio da Luz, but was not included in the squad for the group stages of the Champions League, which prompted rumours that he would seek to leave in the January transfer window. Manager Jorge Jesus confirmed that another newly signed, Brazilian Emerson, would start at left-back and that the Spaniard would find it difficult to be included in matchday squads.

However, during the final stages of the season, Jesus gave Capdevila a long run as a starter, and he made his Champions League debut for the Lisbon club on 4 April 2012, playing the second leg of the quarter-finals against Chelsea, a 2–1 loss at Stamford Bridge (3–1 on aggregate). He was also the habitual first-choice during the domestic League Cup, which Benfica won for the fourth time in a row, and finished the campaign with 12 competitive matches.

=== Later career ===
On 27 July 2012, Capdevila agreed on a return to his first professional club Espanyol. He was released alongside Simão Sabrosa on 22 May 2014, after only ten overall appearances in his second season.

On 16 July 2014, Capdevila signed for NorthEast United, as their marquee player ahead of the inaugural Indian Super League season. He said: “India is a huge country and it should be a privilege for me to be a small part in popularising this global game here and working with the young talented footballers of North East India”. He started in the franchise's first match, a 1–0 win over the Kerala Blasters at the Indira Gandhi Athletic Stadium, being deployed by manager Ricki Herbert as a central defender. On 27 November, in a 3–0 home victory against league leaders Chennaiyin, he was sent off after 72 minutes for a second yellow card, as his team went on to rank in last position.

Capdevila changed countries again on 21 January 2015, joining Belgian Pro League's Lierse. In May, he suffered a knee injury in training, ruling him out for six months. He returned to the Iberian Peninsula on 1 June 2016, signing for Santa Coloma, champions of Andorra's Primera Divisió.

On 5 July 2017, the 39-year-old Capdevila announced his retirement.

== International career ==
Capdevila played for Spain at the 2000 Summer Olympics, winning the silver medal and converting his penalty shootout attempt as his team lost the final to Cameroon. He made his debut for the full side on 16 October 2002 in a 0–0 friendly draw with Paraguay, scoring his first goal in an UEFA Euro 2008 qualifier against Sweden on 17 November 2007, a 3–0 win. Previously, he made the country's final squad for Euro 2004 as an injury replacement for Míchel Salgado, but did not leave the bench.

On 6 February 2008, Capdevila scored the winner in a 1–0 victory over France in a friendly in Málaga. He was subsequently called up to the squad for Euro 2008, where he featured in all the games save one for the eventual champions. During the tournament, he established himself as first choice, his clearance in the dying seconds against Sweden being a crucial part of David Villa's late winner to make the score 2–1; together with right-back Sergio Ramos and central defenders Carles Puyol and Carlos Marchena, he helped keep clean sheets during all three matches of the knock-out stages.

During the first game of the 2009 FIFA Confederations Cup on 14 June 2009, Capdevila set up Fernando Torres's third goal of his hat-trick, and also provided an assist for Cesc Fàbregas as Spain thrashed New Zealand 5–0, with all five goals being created from the left wing. In the second fixture against Iraq, three days later, he assisted Villa's on his 55th-minute goal (the match's only), which allowed for a run to the semi-finals of the competition. Eventually he, Puyol, Villa and Torres were named in the team of the tournament, as the national side finished third; in the competition's group stage, he provided the most assists (three) and made the joint second–highest number of solo runs (ten).

On 20 May 2010, after appearing in all the fixtures during the qualifying phase, contributing one goal to a 4–0 home defeat of Armenia, Capdevila was selected by manager Vicente del Bosque for the 2010 FIFA World Cup, where he played all the minutes for the champions, being the only member of the starting line-up for the final who was not of Real Madrid or FC Barcelona, considering Villa had been signed by the latter days before the tournament; he was among the top ten players of the competition in terms of distance covered, having run 71.79 km.

== Style of play ==
An attacking-minded left-sided full-back or wing-back, Capdevila was known for his speed and passing ability, which enabled him to get forward, make overlapping runs, provide width to his team and link-up with the attack. Regarded as one of the best left-backs in his prime, although he was not as flashy as other players in his position, he was also known for his leadership and consistency as well as his defensive ability, although he was stronger in the offensive aspect of his game.

== Career statistics ==
=== Club ===
Appearances and goals by club, season and competition
Club	Season	League			National cup		League cup		Continental		Other		Total	
Club	Season	Division	Apps	Goals	Apps	Goals	Apps	Goals	Apps	Goals	Apps	Goals	Apps	Goals
Tàrrega	1995–96	Tercera División	33	3	—		—		—		—		33	3
Espanyol B	1996–97	Segunda División B	10	1	—		—		—		—		10	1
Espanyol B	1997–98	Segunda División B	32	3	—		—		—		—		32	3
Espanyol B	1998–99	Segunda División B	3	0	—		—		—		—		3	0
Espanyol B	Total		45	4	—		—		—		—		45	4
Espanyol	1998–99	La Liga	29	4	4	0	—		5	0	—		38	4
Atlético Madrid	1999–2000	La Liga	31	2	4	0	—		5	1	—		40	3
Deportivo	2000–01	La Liga	16	0	2	0	—		3	0	—		21	0
Deportivo	2001–02	La Liga	20	0	7	1	—		8	1	—		35	2
Deportivo	2002–03	La Liga	25	3	7	0	—		9	1	1	0	42	4
Deportivo	2003–04	La Liga	27	3	4	0	—		6	0	—		37	3
Deportivo	2004–05	La Liga	21	1	1	0	—		3	0	—		25	1
Deportivo	2005–06	La Liga	36	4	6	0	—		7	0	—		49	4
Deportivo	2006–07	La Liga	34	4	4	0	—		—		—		38	4
Deportivo	Total		179	15	31	1	—		36	2	1	0	247	18
Villarreal	2007–08	La Liga	36	3	2	0	—		6	1	—		44	4
Villarreal	2008–09	La Liga	36	5	0	0	—		8	1	—		44	6
Villarreal	2009–10	La Liga	37	5	3	0	—		10	1	—		50	5
Villarreal	2010–11	La Liga	31	2	4	0	—		11	1	—		46	3
Villarreal	Total		140	15	9	0	—		35	4	—		184	19
Benfica	2011–12	Primeira Liga	5	0	1	0	4	0	1	0	—		11	0
Espanyol	2012–13	La Liga	26	0	1	0	—		—		—		27	0
Espanyol	2013–14	La Liga	5	0	5	0	—		—		—		10	0
Espanyol	Total		31	0	6	0	—		—		—		37	0
NorthEast United	2014	Indian Super League	12	0	—		—		—		—		12	0
Lierse	2014–15	Belgian Pro League	4	0	0	0	—		—		—		4	0
Santa Coloma	2016–17	Primera Divisió	2	2	0	0	—		2	0	—		4	2
Santa Coloma	2017–18	Primera Divisió	—		—		—		2	0	—		2	0
Santa Coloma	Total		2	2	0	0	—		4	0	—		6	2
Career total			511	45	55	1	4	0	86	7	1	0	657	53

=== International ===
Appearances and goals by national team and year
National team	Year	Apps	Goals
Spain	2002	2	0
Spain	2003	0	0
Spain	2004	3	0
Spain	2005	0	0
Spain	2006	2	0
Spain	2007	7	1
Spain	2008	15	3
Spain	2009	13	0
Spain	2010	14	0
Spain	2011	4	0
Total		60	4

Scores and results list Spain's goal tally first, score column indicates score after each Capdevila goal.

List of international goals scored by Joan Capdevila
No.	Date	Venue	Opponent	Score	Result	Competition
1	17 November 2007	Santiago Bernabéu, Madrid, Spain	Sweden	1–0	3–0	UEFA Euro 2008 qualifying
2	6 February 2008	La Rosaleda, Málaga, Spain	France	1–0	1–0	Friendly
3	31 May 2008	Nuevo Colombino, Huelva, Spain	Peru	2–1	2–1	Friendly
4	10 September 2008	Carlos Belmonte, Albacete, Spain	Armenia	1–0	4–0	2010 FIFA World Cup qualification

== Honours ==
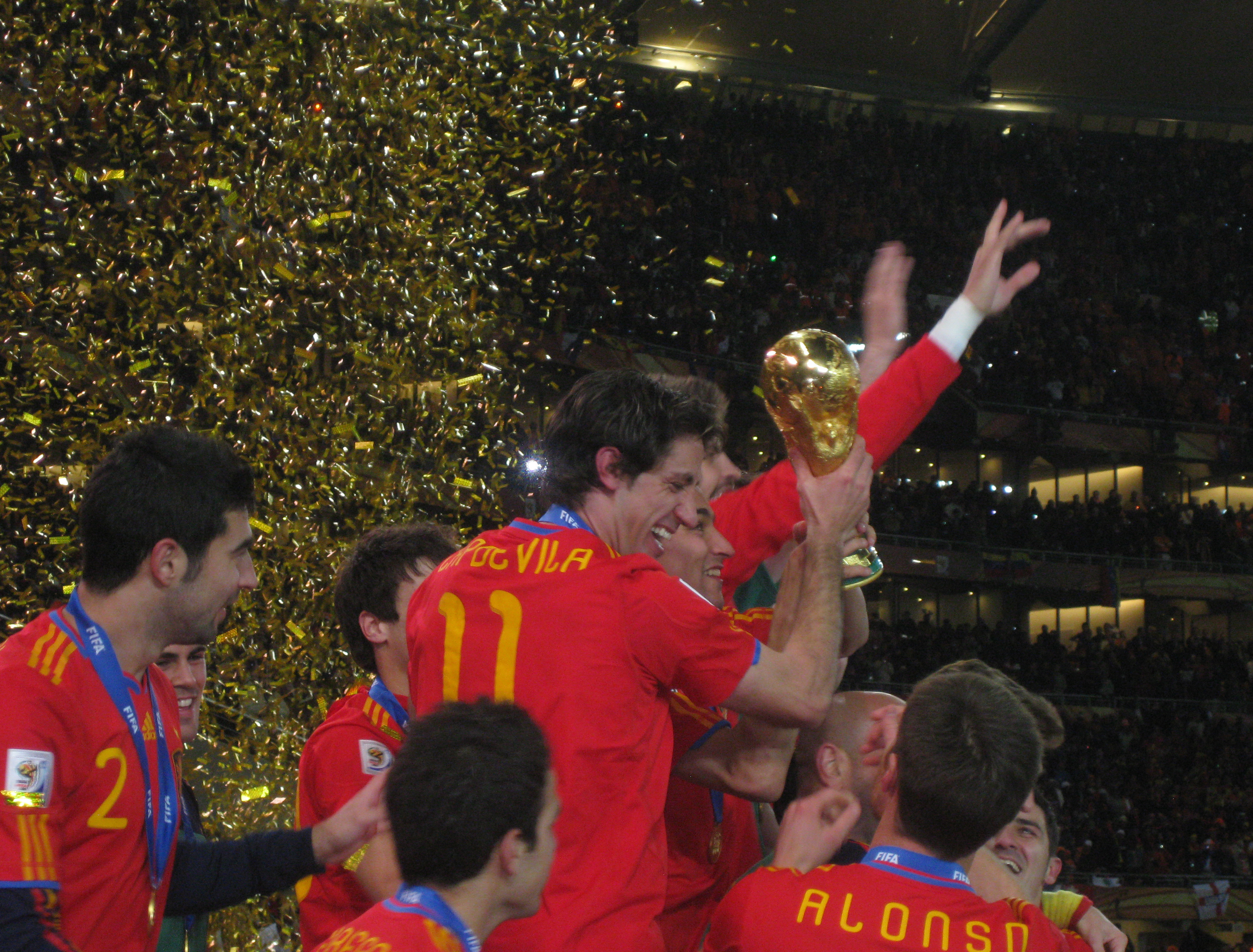
Capdevila holding the 2010 World Cup trophy

Deportivo

- Copa del Rey: 2001–02
- Supercopa de España: 2002

Benfica

- Taça da Liga: 2011–12

Santa Coloma

- Primera Divisió: 2016–17

Spain U23

- Summer Olympic silver medal: 2000

Spain

- FIFA World Cup: 2010
- UEFA European Championship: 2008
- FIFA Confederations Cup third place: 2009

Individual

- FIFA Confederations Cup FIFA.com Users' Top 11: 2009
- FIFA World Cup All-Star Team: 2010

Orders

- Gold Medal of the Royal Order of Sports Merit

== See also ==
- List of footballers with 400 or more La Liga appearances
