= Enrique Romero =

Spanish footballer (born 1971)

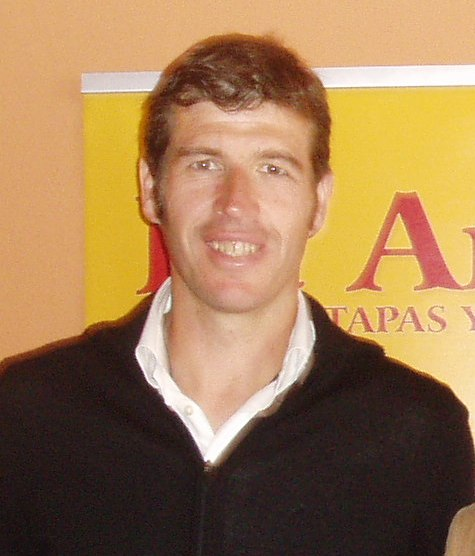
- Romero in 2009

Personal information
- Full name: Enrique Fernández Romero
- Date of birth: 23 June 1971 (age 55)
- Place of birth: Jerez de la Frontera, Spain
- Height: 1.83 m (6 ft 0 in)
- Position: Left-back

Youth career
- Flamenco Jerez

Senior career*
Years	Team	Apps	(Gls)
1989–1991	Sanluqueño	32	(0)
1991–1993	Logroñés B	65	(6)
1992–1994	Logroñés	32	(4)
1994–1997	Valencia	91	(5)
1997–1998	Mallorca	38	(3)
1998–2006	Deportivo La Coruña	218	(2)
2006–2007	Betis	17	(0)
Total		493	(20)

International career
2000–2004	Spain	10	(0)
- * Club domestic league appearances and goals

Enrique Fernández Romero (born 23 June 1971) is a Spanish former professional footballer who played as a left-back.

He played for four clubs during his professional career over 16 seasons – notably Deportivo which he helped win four major titles, including its only La Liga championship – amassing top-division totals of 396 games and 14 goals.

Romero represented Spain at the 2002 World Cup.

== Club career ==
Born in Jerez de la Frontera, Province of Cádiz, Romero started his professional career with La Rioja's CD Logroñés. He totalled only three La Liga games in his first two seasons but was first-choice in 1993–94, with the team again managing to retain their division status.

After having represented Valencia CF and RCD Mallorca, never appearing in less than 30 league matches during his spell at both clubs, Romero joined Deportivo de La Coruña in 1998. There, he blossomed into an attacking left-back, notably playing 50 UEFA Champions League matches for the Galicians and contributing 34 and one goal in the 1999–2000 campaign as Depor won its first national championship.

In summer 2006, after being ousted by younger Joan Capdevila – although he was a very reliable defensive unit, sometimes being deployed as central defender– Romero signed with Real Betis. After a sole season, which coincided with the emergence of new signing Fernando Vega, he opted to retire from professional football at the age of 36, having appeared in more than 500 competitive matches (nearly 400 in the Spanish top division).

== International career ==
Romero won ten caps for Spain, his first appearance coming on 23 February 2000 in a friendly with Croatia, in Split. He represented the nation at the 2002 FIFA World Cup in Japan and South Korea, playing three times for the eventual quarter-finalists.

== Honours ==
Deportivo

- La Liga: 1999–2000
- Copa del Rey: 2001–02
- Supercopa de España: 2000, 2002

Mallorca

- Copa del Rey runner-up: 1997–98
