= Sergio González (footballer, born 1976) =

Spanish footballer and manager

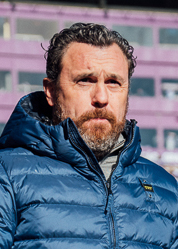
- González as Valladolid coach in 2019

Personal information
- Full name: Sergio González Soriano
- Date of birth: 10 November 1976 (age 49)
- Place of birth: L'Hospitalet, Spain
- Height: 1.82 m (6 ft 0 in)
- Position: Midfielder

Youth career
- Mercat Nou Magòria
- 1994–1995: Hospitalet

Senior career*
Years	Team	Apps	(Gls)
1995	Hospitalet	6	(2)
1995–1998	Espanyol B	100	(12)
1998–2001	Espanyol	110	(5)
2001–2010	Deportivo La Coruña	294	(27)
2010–2011	Levante	14	(2)
Total		524	(48)

International career
2001–2005	Spain	11	(0)
1999–2013	Catalonia	15	(2)

Managerial career
- 2013–2014: Espanyol B (assistant)
- 2014: Espanyol B
- 2014–2015: Espanyol
- 2015–2018: Catalonia
- 2018–2021: Valladolid
- 2022–2024: Cádiz
- 2026: Cádiz
- * Club domestic league appearances and goals

Sergio González Soriano (born 10 November 1976), known simply as Sergio as a player, is a Spanish football manager and former player.

A hard-working central midfielder, he was adept at both defence and playmaking, and spent nearly one decade as a professional at Deportivo de La Coruña after starting at Espanyol. Over 14 La Liga seasons, he amassed totals of 418 matches and 34 goals. He represented Spain in the 2002 World Cup.

González started working as a coach in 2014, also with Espanyol.

== Playing career ==
=== Club ===
Born in L'Hospitalet de Llobregat, Barcelona, Catalonia, Sergio started out at local CE L'Hospitalet, signing with neighbouring RCD Espanyol in 1995 and going on to spend nearly three years with its reserves in the Segunda División B. He made his La Liga debut on 10 April 1998 in a 2–0 home win against CD Tenerife, and was an undisputed starter the next three seasons, going on to total nearly 125 official appearances.

Looking for greater challenges, Sergio accepted a move to Deportivo de La Coruña in the summer of 2001. In his first year with the Galician team he played all 38 matches and scored four goals, as Depor finished runners-up and won the Copa del Rey – in the final, he opened the 2–1 victory over Real Madrid at their homeground as the opposing club was celebrating its 100th anniversary (the play was dubbed Centenariazo).

Sergio went on to only miss eight league matches over the following four seasons, making 383 competitive appearances during his stint. He only failed to find the net at least once in the 2009–10 campaign, in which he appeared in 24 games.

In mid-July 2010, after nearly one full decade with Deportivo, 33-year-old Sergio joined Levante UD, recently returned to the top flight. He was essential as the Valencians won in the fourth round of the season after three losses, scoring the only goal at UD Almería on 22 September. After several injury problems, he was released on 30 June 2011.

=== International ===
Sergio made his debut for Spain on 24 March 2001, coming on as a substitute for Pep Guardiola in a 5–0 win against Liechtenstein for the 2002 FIFA World Cup qualifiers. Selected for the finals in Japan and South Korea, he appeared in a 3–2 group stage defeat of South Africa, replacing David Albelda.

Since 1999, Sergio represented the Catalonia football team, making his debut on 23 December in a 1–0 friendly win with Yugoslavia and scoring his first goal nearly ten years later, in a 4–2 friendly against Argentina.

== Coaching career ==
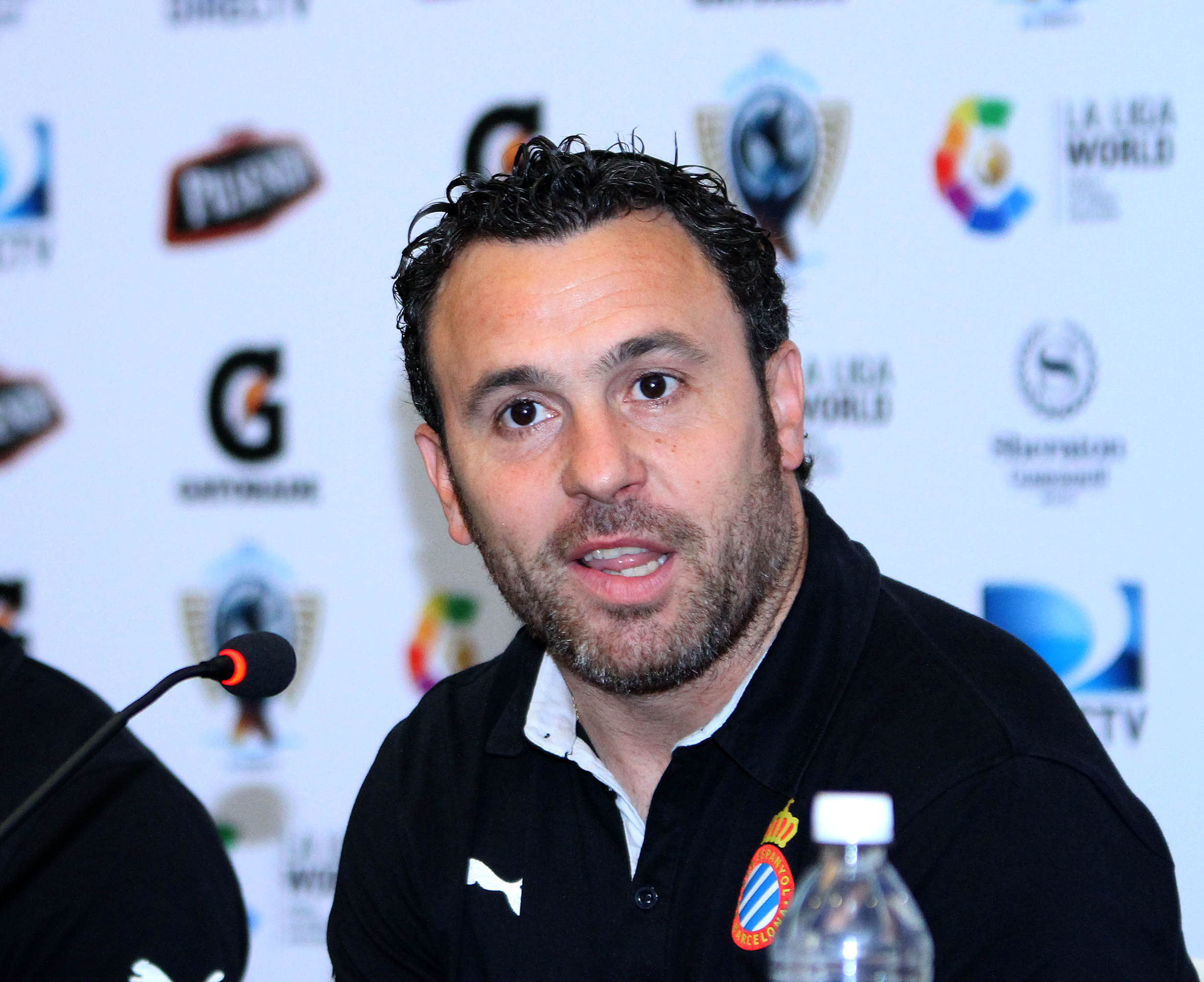
Sergio with Espanyol in 2015

=== Club ===
González started working as a manager in 2013, being in charge of Espanyol B. On 27 May 2014, he was named as the new coach of the first team, replacing Javier Aguirre after the latter's contract expired; sporting director Óscar Perarnau commented: "We are delighted with Sergio's personality and he knows the club perfectly. "He has little experience as a coach but everyone has to start one day and we believe he has what it takes".

On 14 December 2015, following a 1–0 away loss against RC Celta de Vigo, and even though the team was still several points clear of the relegation zone, González was relieved of his duties. In his 62 games in charge, he collected 22 wins, 14 draws and 26 losses.

On 10 April 2018, after more than two years without a club, González was appointed manager of Real Valladolid in the Segunda División. He managed to win eight of his first 12 matches, leading them to fifth place in the regular season and promotion in the play-offs.

In December 2019, with his contract due to expire the following summer, González signed a new deal to keep him at Pucela until 2022. When relegation was confirmed in May 2021, he was dismissed by chairman Ronaldo.

On 11 January 2022, González replaced Álvaro Cervera at top-flight side Cádiz CF. In his first game four days later, the team advanced on penalties after a goalless draw away to Sporting de Gijón in the domestic cup, making the quarter-finals for the fourth time in their history and first since 2006.

González was sacked on 20 January 2024, after four months without a win and with his side third-bottom. He returned to the club – back in the second division – in March 2026, taking over from Gaizka Garitano, but was once more dismissed in April after just one victory in seven matches.

=== International ===
González also managed the Catalan national team, being appointed alongside Gerard López by the Catalan Football Federation in October 2015. On his debut on 26 December, the team lost 1–0 to their Basque counterparts in the Centenary Trophy.

== Career statistics ==
=== Club ===
Appearances and goals by club, season and competition
Club	Season	League			Copa del Rey		Europe		Other		Total	
Club	Season	Division	Apps	Goals	Apps	Goals	Apps	Goals	Apps	Goals	Apps	Goals
Hospitalet	1994–95	Segunda División B	6	2	0	0	–		–		6	2
Espanyol B	1995–96	Segunda División B	36	5	0	0	–		–		36	4
Espanyol B	1996–97	Segunda División B	34	2	0	0	–		–		34	2
Espanyol B	1997–98	Segunda División B	30	5	0	0	–		4 (Note: Appearances in Segunda División B play-offs)	0	34	5
Espanyol B	Total		100	12	0	0	0	0	4	0	104	12
Espanyol	1996–97	La Liga	0	0	1	0	0	0	–		1	0
Espanyol	1997–98	La Liga	6	1	0	0	0	0	–		6	1
Espanyol	1998–99	La Liga	34	0	4	0	2 (Note: Appearances in UEFA Intertoto Cup)	0	–		40	0
Espanyol	1999–00	La Liga	32	0	9	1	0	0	–		41	1
Espanyol	2000–01	La Liga	38	4	6	0	6 (Note: Appearances in UEFA Cup)	0	2 (Note: Appearances in Supercopa de España)	0	52	6
Espanyol	Total		110	5	20	1	8	2	2	0	140	8
Deportivo	2001–02	La Liga	38	4	4	1	10 (Note: Appearances in UEFA Champions League)	1	–		52	6
Deportivo	2002–03	La Liga	37	3	6	1	10	0	2	0	55	4
Deportivo	2003–04	La Liga	37	3	3	0	14	1	–		54	4
Deportivo	2004–05	La Liga	34	3	2	0	5	0	–		41	3
Deportivo	2005–06	La Liga	36	3	6	1	6	0	–		48	4
Deportivo	2006–07	La Liga	28	2	5	1	0	0	–		33	3
Deportivo	2007–08	La Liga	32	5	2	2	0	0	–		34	7
Deportivo	2008–09	La Liga	28	4	1	0	10 (Note: One appearance in UEFA Intertoto Cup, nine appearances and one goal in UEFA Cup)	1	–		38	5
Deportivo	2009–10	La Liga	24	0	3	0	0	0	–		27	0
Deportivo	Total		294	27	32	6	55	3	2	0	383	36
Levante	2010–11	La Liga	14	2	2	1	0	0	–		16	3
Career total			524	48	54	8	63	5	8	0	649	61

=== International ===
Appearances and goals by national team and year
National team	Year	Apps	Goals
Spain	2001	3	0
Spain	2002	4	0
Spain	2003	3	0
Spain	2004	0	0
Spain	2005	1	0
Total		11	0
Catalonia	1999	1	0
Catalonia	2000	1	0
Catalonia	2001	1	0
Catalonia	2002	1	0
Catalonia	2003	1	0
Catalonia	2004	2	0
Catalonia	2005	1	0
Catalonia	2006	1	0
Catalonia	2007	1	0
Catalonia	2008	2	0
Catalonia	2009	1	1
Catalonia	2010	1	0
Catalonia	2011	0	0
Catalonia	2012	0	0
Catalonia	2013	1	1
Total		15	2

Scores and results list Catalonia's goal tally first, score column indicates score after each Sergio goal.

List of international goals scored by Sergio
No.	Date	Venue	Opponent	Score	Result	Competition
1	22 December 2009	Camp Nou, Barcelona, Spain	Argentina	3–1	4–2	Friendly
2	2 January 2013	Cornellà-El Prat, Barcelona, Spain	Nigeria	1–0	1–1	Friendly

== Managerial statistics ==
As of match played 19 April 2026

Managerial record by team and tenure
Team	Nat	From	To	Record								Ref
Team	Nat	From	To	G	W	D	L	GF	GA	GD	Win %	Ref
Espanyol B	(Spain)	22 January 2014	27 May 2014	21	11	7	3	32	25	+7	52.38	
Espanyol	(Spain)	27 May 2014	14 December 2015	62	22	14	26	73	85	−12	35.48	
Valladolid	(Spain)	10 April 2018	23 May 2021	137	38	46	53	147	177	−30	27.74	
Cádiz	(Spain)	11 January 2022	20 January 2024	82	18	30	34	69	108	−39	21.95	
Cádiz	(Spain)	9 March 2026	22 April 2026	7	1	0	6	4	15	−11	14.29	
Total				309	90	97	122	325	410	−85	29.13	—

== Honours ==
Espanyol

- Copa del Rey: 1999–2000

Deportivo

- Copa del Rey: 2001–02
- Supercopa de España: 2002
- UEFA Intertoto Cup: 2008

== See also ==
- List of La Liga players (400+ appearances)
