= Aldo Duscher =

Argentine footballer

Personal information
- Full name: Aldo Pedro Duscher
- Date of birth: 22 March 1979 (age 47)
- Place of birth: Esquel, Argentina
- Height: 1.80 m (5 ft 11 in)
- Position: Defensive midfielder

Youth career
- 1987–1991: Belgrano Esquel
- 1991–1993: Gualjaina
- 1993–1997: Newell's Old Boys

Senior career*
Years	Team	Apps	(Gls)
1996–1998	Newell's Old Boys	31	(1)
1998–2000	Sporting CP	55	(6)
2000–2007	Deportivo La Coruña	157	(0)
2007–2008	Racing Santander	34	(5)
2008–2010	Sevilla	37	(0)
2010–2012	Espanyol	19	(0)
2011–2012	→ Barcelona SC (loan)	7	(0)
2012	Enosis Neon	8	(0)
2013	Veria	0	(0)
Total		348	(12)

International career
1995	Argentina U17	6	(0)
1999	Argentina U20	4	(0)
2000	Argentina U23	7	(0)
2005	Argentina	3	(0)

Managerial career
- 2014–2015: Belgrano Esquel
- 2020–2021: Deportivo La Coruña (youth)
- 2024–2025: Paraguay U20
- 2025: Quilmes
- * Club domestic league appearances and goals

Aldo Pedro Duscher (born 22 March 1979) is an Argentine former professional footballer who played as a defensive midfielder. He is currently a manager.

He spent most of his career in Spain, playing 338 official matches for four clubs, most notably Deportivo de La Coruña. Over 11 seasons, he amassed La Liga totals of 247 games and five goals, and also had a two-year spell in Portugal with Sporting CP.

Duscher was an Argentina international in the 2000s.

== Club career ==
Born in Esquel, Chubut Province of Austrian descent, Duscher made his professional debut in 1996, with Newell's Old Boys. In 1998, the 19-year-old moved to Europe to play for Sporting CP, where he won the Primeira Liga in his second season.

Duscher was then signed by Deportivo de La Coruña, for a price of €13 million. After just five La Liga appearances in his first year, he featured more in the following years as a complement and future replacement to veteran Brazilian Mauro Silva; on 10 April 2002, his tackle in a game against Manchester United in the quarter-finals of the UEFA Champions League led to David Beckham breaking his metatarsal, almost ruling him out of the FIFA World Cup.

Although he fully established himself as first choice in midfield, Duscher's contract with Depor expired in June 2007, and he joined Racing de Santander the next month, where he was a key member on a side that achieved a first-ever qualification for the UEFA Cup in the 2007–08 campaign. On 9 December 2007, during a 3–1 home win over Mallorca, he scored his first goal in the Spanish top division in his eighth season.

Duscher agreed to a three-year deal at Sevilla on 8 August 2008. He scored his first goal for the Andalusians on 4 February 2009, in the first leg of the semi-finals of the Copa del Rey, a 2–1 home victory against Athletic Bilbao (eventual 4–2 aggregate loss).

In 2009–10, Sevilla finished fourth and returned to the Champions League, but Duscher only appeared in ten games (three complete). Subsequently, he terminated his contract and moved to fellow top-flight side Espanyol for one year.

On 27 July 2011, Duscher joined Barcelona S.C. from Ecuador on a one-year loan. The following summer, having been released by Espanyol, he signed for Enosis Neon of the Cypriot First Division.

In February 2013, Duscher joined Veria in Greece. He retired in March at the age of 34, however, after failing to appear officially for the club.

== International career ==
Duscher was capped three times by the Argentina national team, all appearances coming in 2005.

== Coaching career ==
Duscher started working as a manager in 2014, with Belgrano Esquel in the amateur Torneo Argentino B. He returned to Deportivo on 3 September 2020 as part of the youth structure.

From 6 June 2024 until 29 January 2025, Duscher was in charge of the Paraguay under-20 national team. He was dismissed following a 6–0 loss against Uruguay in the South American Youth Football Championship, even though the main reason for this was allegedly a post-match radio interview he gave.

Duscher was appointed at Primera Nacional club on 20 June 2025. He resigned two months later; shortly after, however, he returned to the training grounds with the intention of running a training session, being involved in a heated argument with president Mateo Magadán.

== Honours ==
Sporting CP

- Primeira Liga: 1999–2000

Deportivo

- Copa del Rey: 2001–02
- Supercopa de España: 2000, 2002

Sevilla

- Copa del Rey: 2009–10
