= José Francisco Molina =

Spanish footballer (born 1970)

José Molina
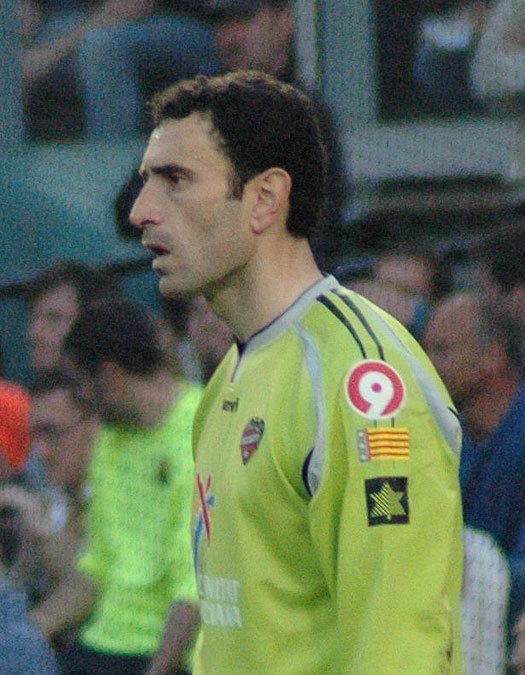
- Molina with Levante in 2007

Personal information
- Full name: José Francisco Molina Jiménez
- Date of birth: 8 August 1970 (age 56)
- Place of birth: Valencia, Spain
- Height: 1.85 m (6 ft 1 in)
- Position: Goalkeeper

Team information
- Current team: Honduras (manager)

Youth career
- Benimar
- Valencia

Senior career*
| Years | Team | Apps | (Gls) |
| 1989–1993 | Valencia B | 37 | (0) |
| 1990–1991 | → Alzira (loan) | 29 | (0) |
| 1993–1994 | Valencia | 0 | (0) |
| 1994 | → Villarreal (loan) | 18 | (0) |
| 1994–1995 | Albacete | 23 | (0) |
| 1995–2000 | Atlético Madrid | 189 | (0) |
| 2000–2006 | Deportivo La Coruña | 169 | (0) |
| 2006–2007 | Levante | 34 | (0) |
| Total | | 499 | (0) |

International career
| 1996–2000 | Spain | 9 | (0) |

Managerial career
- 2009–2011: Villarreal C
- 2011: Villarreal B
- 2011–2012: Villarreal
- 2013–2014: Getafe B
- 2014–2015: Kitchee
- 2016: ATK
- 2017–2018: Atlético San Luis
- 2024–2025: Mohun Bagan
- 2026–: Honduras
- * Club domestic league appearances and goals

José Francisco Molina Jiménez (born 8 August 1970) is a Spanish former professional footballer who played as a goalkeeper. He is currently manager of the Honduras national team.

Eleven years of his 18-year senior career were spent at Atlético Madrid and Deportivo de La Coruña, where he won a total of five titles. Over 14 seasons, he appeared in 415 La Liga matches.

A Spain international for four years, Molina represented the nation at the 1998 World Cup and two European Championships.

== Club career ==
Born in Valencia, Valencian Community, Molina started playing professionally with modest UD Alzira, being purchased in 1991 by local giants Valencia CF. After a loan stint with neighbours Villarreal CF he was sold to Albacete Balompié, making his La Liga debut on 8 January 1995 in a 1–0 home win against Real Oviedo. Even though he conceded eight goals in the last matchday, a home loss against Deportivo de La Coruña, his team managed to escape relegation in the playoffs.

Molina's career was intimately related with Atlético Madrid, of which he claimed to be a fan. Signing in 1995, he helped the capital side win a double (league and Copa del Rey) in his first year, going on to miss only two league matches over four seasons.

Joining 2000 league champions Deportivo La Coruña after Atlético's relegation, Molina helped win a Spanish cup and two supercups, being an undisputed starter throughout his stint in Galicia. However, on 14 October 2002, he announced that he suffered from testicular cancer, and that he was forced to undergo treatment for his illness, thus missing most of the 2002–03 campaign (ten league appearances, as Depor finished third); he eventually recovered fully.

After his link expired, Molina returned home to Valencia for 2006–07, playing for top-division strugglers Levante UD, but did not renew his contract at the season's end, retiring subsequently as the club retained its league status.

== International career ==
Molina made his Spain national team debut as an outfield player against Norway on 24 April 1996 – a cameo appearance as a left winger, as all replacements had been made by coach Javier Clemente and Juan Manuel López retired injured.

He was then included in the squads for UEFA Euro 1996 and the 1998 FIFA World Cup, but had to wait until Euro 2000 for first-choice status, although he was dropped after a blunder in the opening 1–0 loss to Norway and did not play afterwards.

== Coaching career ==
In the 2009–10 campaign, Molina started a coaching career with Villarreal C of Tercera División. On 12 May 2011, he replaced the fired Javi Gracia at the helm of the reserves in the Segunda División as the team was seriously threatened with relegation.

Molina reached Villarreal's main squad on 22 December 2011, taking the place of sacked Juan Carlos Garrido. He was himself dismissed on 18 March of the following year after a 1–0 away loss against former club Levante, with the Yellow Submarine dangerously close to the relegation zone (17th).

In 2014, after leading Getafe CF B to the 14th place in the Segunda División B, Molina was appointed at Hong Kong's Kitchee SC. In his only season he managed win the domestic treble, also taking the team to the quarter-finals of the AFC Cup.

On 3 May 2016, Molina was announced as the head coach of Indian Super League side ATK, replacing countryman Antonio López Habas. On 14 November of the following year, he was appointed at Ascenso MX club Atlético San Luis ahead of the Clausura tournament. He was relieved of his duties by the latter on 18 February 2018 after just two wins in 11 matches in all competitions, with his side in last position in the league.

In July 2018, Molina was appointed as sporting director of the Royal Spanish Football Federation, replacing Fernando Hierro who had resigned in the aftermath of Spain's performance at the 2018 FIFA World Cup. In December 2022, he left his position following a last-16 elimination at the 2022 World Cup at the hands of Morocco.

Molina signed as manager of Indian top-tier Mohun Bagan Super Giant on 11 June 2024, again taking over from López Habas. He led the club to both the national championship and the League Shield on his debut campaign.

On 26 November 2025, Molina left by mutual consent. The following February, he became head coach of the Honduras national team.

== Career statistics ==
Appearances and goals by club, season and competition
| Club | Season | League | | | National cup | | Europe | | Other | | Total | |
| Club | Season | Division | Apps | Goals | Apps | Goals | Apps | Goals | Apps | Goals | Apps | Goals |
|---|---|---|---|---|---|---|---|---|---|---|---|---|
| Valencia B | 1992–93 | Segunda División B | 19 | 0 | — | | — | | — | | 19 | 0 |
| Valencia B | 1993–94 | Segunda División B | 18 | 0 | — | | — | | — | | 18 | 0 |
| Valencia B | Total | | 37 | 0 | — | | — | | — | | 37 | 0 |
| Alzira (loan) | 1990–91 | Segunda División B | 29 | 0 | 3 | 0 | — | | — | | 32 | 0 |
| Villarreal (loan) | 1993–94 | Segunda División | 18 | 0 | — | | — | | — | | 18 | 0 |
| Albacete | 1994–95 | La Liga | 23 | 0 | 9 | 0 | — | | 2 | 0 | 34 | 0 |
| Atlético Madrid | 1995–96 | La Liga | 42 | 0 | 11 | 0 | — | | — | | 53 | 0 |
| Atlético Madrid | 1996–97 | La Liga | 41 | 0 | 4 | 0 | 8 | 0 | 2 | 0 | 55 | 0 |
| Atlético Madrid | 1997–98 | La Liga | 37 | 0 | 0 | 0 | 10 | 0 | — | | 47 | 0 |
| Atlético Madrid | 1998–99 | La Liga | 38 | 0 | 7 | 0 | 8 | 0 | — | | 53 | 0 |
| Atlético Madrid | 1999–2000 | La Liga | 31 | 0 | 1 | 0 | 8 | 0 | — | | 40 | 0 |
| Atlético Madrid | Total | | 189 | 0 | 23 | 0 | 34 | 0 | 2 | 0 | 248 | 0 |
| Deportivo La Coruña | 2000–01 | La Liga | 32 | 0 | 0 | 0 | 13 | 0 | 1 | 0 | 46 | 0 |
| Deportivo La Coruña | 2001–02 | La Liga | 36 | 0 | 3 | 0 | 11 | 0 | — | | 50 | 0 |
| Deportivo La Coruña | 2002–03 | La Liga | 10 | 0 | 0 | 0 | 1 | 0 | 2 | 0 | 13 | 0 |
| Deportivo La Coruña | 2003–04 | La Liga | 33 | 0 | 0 | 0 | 14 | 0 | — | | 47 | 0 |
| Deportivo La Coruña | 2004–05 | La Liga | 20 | 0 | 0 | 0 | 7 | 0 | — | | 27 | 0 |
| Deportivo La Coruña | 2005–06 | La Liga | 38 | 0 | 6 | 0 | 8 | 0 | — | | 52 | 0 |
| Deportivo La Coruña | Total | | 169 | 0 | 9 | 0 | 54 | 0 | 3 | 0 | 235 | 0 |
| Levante | 2006–07 | La Liga | 34 | 0 | 0 | 0 | — | | — | | 34 | 0 |
| Career total | | | 499 | 0 | 41 | 0 | 88 | 0 | 7 | 0 | 635 | 0 |

== Managerial statistics ==
As of 31 October 2025

Managerial record by team and tenure
| Team | From | To | Record | | | | | Ref. |
| Team | From | To | P | W | D | L | Win % | Ref. |
|---|---|---|---|---|---|---|---|---|
| Villarreal C | 1 July 2009 | 12 April 2011 | 73 | 34 | 16 | 23 | 46.58 | |
| Villarreal B | 12 May 2011 | 22 December 2011 | 22 | 5 | 7 | 10 | 22.73 | |
| Villarreal | 22 December 2011 | 18 March 2012 | 11 | 3 | 3 | 5 | 27.27 | |
| Getafe B | 18 June 2013 | 18 March 2014 | 30 | 9 | 5 | 16 | 30.00 | |
| Kitchee | 24 May 2014 | 31 May 2015 | 38 | 24 | 7 | 7 | 63.16 | |
| ATK | 5 May 2016 | 18 December 2016 | 17 | 5 | 10 | 2 | 29.41 | |
| Atlético San Luis | 14 November 2017 | 18 February 2018 | 11 | 2 | 1 | 8 | 18.18 | |
| Mohun Bagan | 11 June 2024 | 26 November 2025 | 42 | 28 | 8 | 6 | 66.67 | |
| Career total | | | 244 | 108 | 60 | 76 | 44.26 | — |

== Honours ==
=== Player ===
Atlético Madrid

- La Liga: 1995–96
- Copa del Rey: 1995–96

Deportivo

- Copa del Rey: 2001–02
- Supercopa de España: 2000, 2002

Individual

- Ricardo Zamora Trophy: 1995–96

=== Manager ===
Kitchee

- Hong Kong Premier League: 2014–15
- Hong Kong FA Cup: 2014–15
- Hong Kong League Cup: 2014–15

Atlético Kolkata

- Indian Super League: 2016

Mohun Bagan

- Indian Super League: 2024–25
- Indian Super League Winners Shield: 2024–25
- IFA Shield: 2025

== See also ==
- List of Atlético Madrid players (+100)
- List of La Liga players (400+ appearances)
