= César Martín =

Spanish footballer

Personal information
- Full name: César Martín Villar
- Date of birth: 3 April 1977 (age 49)
- Place of birth: Oviedo, Spain
- Height: 1.85 m (6 ft 1 in)
- Position: Centre back

Youth career
- Oviedo

Senior career*
Years	Team	Apps	(Gls)
1994–1995	Oviedo B	32	(3)
1995–1999	Oviedo	101	(6)
1999–2006	Deportivo La Coruña	96	(1)
2006–2007	Levante	3	(0)
2007	Bolton Wanderers	1	(0)
2007–2009	Hércules	39	(5)
2009–2010	Castellón	20	(0)
Total		292	(15)

International career
1994–1995	Spain U18	19	(1)
1995	Spain U19	1	(0)
1995	Spain U20	5	(0)
1996–2000	Spain U21	8	(2)
1999–2004	Spain	12	(3)
2000–2002	Asturias	3	(1)

Managerial career
- 2012–2013: Covadonga
- * Club domestic league appearances and goals

César Martín Villar (born 3 April 1977) is a Spanish retired professional footballer who played as a central defender.

Over the course of 13 seasons he appeared in 200 La Liga games, mostly in representation of Oviedo and Deportivo, after which he had a six-month spell in England with Bolton.

A Spanish international during five years, César appeared in Euro 2004.

== Club career ==
Born in Oviedo, César started his professional career in 1994 playing for local Real Oviedo. In his debut season he helped with 17 La Liga matches as the Asturias side, which also featured Croatian Nikola Jerkan in the defensive sector, finished ninth.

After being instrumental in Oviedo's 1998–99 league campaign by playing 31 games and scoring four goals, César moved to Deportivo de La Coruña for approximately €7 million. With the Galicians he won one league, one Copa del Rey and two Supercopa de España trophies, but appeared sparingly during his seven-year stay (maximum 20 matches in 2002–03) mainly due to injuries.

César fell out of favour when Joaquín Caparrós took over as manager of Deportivo, and eventually moved to Levante UD on 18 July 2006. Things did not improve at his new team where he only played five times all competitions comprised, also getting sent off in a 3–0 league home loss to Atlético Madrid; on 31 January 2007, he cancelled his contract by mutual consent.

César joined Bolton Wanderers on a short-term contract until the end of the season, in February 2007. He made his Premier League debut as an injury-time substitute for Nicolas Anelka on 28 April, in a 2–2 draw against Chelsea; on 18 May, after failing to feature in any more matches, it was revealed that he would leave the club after the new manager Sammy Lee decided not to extend his contract, and he subsequently returned to his homeland, signing with Hércules CF in Segunda División.

For the 2009–10 campaign, veteran César continued in the second level, agreeing to a 2+1 contract with CD Castellón. However, after the Valencian Community team's relegation, the 33-year-old was one of the many players released from contract, retiring shortly afterwards.

César returned to Oviedo in summer 2015, in directorial capacities.

== International career ==
César made his first appearance for Spain on 18 August 1999, playing the entire 2–1 friendly win over Poland in Warsaw. He scored twice in his first two caps, both in UEFA Euro 2000 qualifiers and both through headers.

César was included in the Euro 2004 squad, but did not play. Despite showing early promise, his international career never fully took off, mostly because of injury troubles and the emergence of players like Carles Puyol and Pablo Ibáñez; he also found the net in his last match, a 4–0 friendly victory with Andorra in the week prior to the continental competition.

=== International goals ===
Scores and results list Spain's goal tally first, score column indicates score after each Martín goal.

List of international goals scored by César Martín
No.	Date	Venue	Opponent	Score	Result	Competition
1	8 September 1999	Vivero, Badajoz, Spain	Cyprus	7–0	8–0	Euro 2000 qualifying
2	10 October 1999	Carlos Belmonte, Albacete, Spain	Israel	2–0	3–0	Euro 2000 qualifying
3	5 June 2004	Alfonso Pérez, Getafe, Spain	Andorra	3–0	4–0	Friendly

== Honours ==
Deportivo

- La Liga: 1999–2000
- Copa del Rey: 2001–02
- Supercopa de España: 2002

Spain U18

- UEFA European Under-18 Championship: 1995
