= 1999–2000 La Liga =

69th season of La Liga

La Liga
- Season: 1999–2000
- Dates: 21 August 1999 – 20 May 2000
- Champions: Deportivo La Coruña; 1st title
- Relegated: Real Betis; Atlético Madrid; Sevilla
- Champions League: Real Madrid (as Champions League winners); Deportivo La Coruña; Barcelona; Valencia
- UEFA Cup: Zaragoza; Alavés; Espanyol (as Copa del Rey winners); Rayo Vallecano (via Fair Play)
- Intertoto Cup: Celta Vigo; Mallorca
- Matches: 380
- Goals: 999 (2.63 per match)
- Top goalscorer: Salva (27 goals)
- Biggest home win: Atlético Madrid 5–0 Real Oviedo (22 December 1999)
- Biggest away win: Real Madrid 1–5 Zaragoza (4 December 1999); Athletic Bilbao 0–4 Barcelona (11 March 2000); Sevilla 0–4 Mallorca (7 May 2000)
- Highest scoring: Valencia 6–2 Real Oviedo (9 April 2000); Celta Vigo 5–3 Real Oviedo (16 January 2000)

The 1999–2000 La Liga season, the 69th since its establishment. It began on 21 August 1999, and concluded on 20 May 2000. Deportivo La Coruña won a first La Liga title with 69 points, the lowest for a champion since the three points for a win rule was introduced in 1995.

== Promotion and relegation ==
Twenty teams competed in the league – the top sixteen teams from the previous season and the four teams promoted from the Segunda División. The promoted teams were Málaga, Numancia, Sevilla and Rayo Vallecano. Sevilla and Rayo Vallecano returned to the top flight after an absence of two years while Málaga CF and Numancia were promoted for the first time. However, since CD Málaga played in the 1989–90 La Liga, the city of Málaga returned to the top fight after an absence of nine years. They replaced Extremadura, Villarreal (both teams relegated after a season's presence), Tenerife (ending their top flight spell of eleven years) and Salamanca (ending their top flight spell of two years).

== Team information ==
=== Personnel and kits ===
Team	Chairman	Manager	Captain	Kit manufacturer	Shirt sponsor
Alavés	(Spain) Gonzalo Antón	(Spain) José Manuel Esnal		Luanvi	Guascor
Athletic Bilbao	(Spain) José María Arrate	(France) Luis Fernández		Adidas	none
Atlético Madrid	(Spain) Jesús Gil	(Italy) Claudio Ranieri		Reebok	none
Barcelona	(Spain) Josep Lluís Núñez	(Netherlands) Louis van Gaal		Nike	none
Betis	(Spain) Manuel Ruiz de Lopera	(Argentina) Carlos Griguol		Kappa	none
Celta	(Spain) Horacio Gómez Araujo	(Spain) Víctor Fernández		Umbro	Citroën
Deportivo	(Spain) Augusto César Lendoiro	(Spain) Javier Irureta		Adidas	Feiraco
Espanyol	(Spain) Daniel Sánchez Llibre	(Argentina) Miguel Ángel Brindisi		John Smith	none
Málaga	(Spain) Fernando Puche	(Spain) Joaquín Peiró		Kelme	Unicaja
Mallorca	(Spain) Guillem Reynés	(Spain) Fernando Vázquez		Kelme	Spanair
Numancia	(Spain) Francisco Rubio	(Spain) Andoni Goikoetxea		Joma	Caja Duero
Oviedo	(Spain) Eugenio Prieto Álvarez	(Spain) Luis Aragonés		Erima	Asturias
Racing	(Spain) Miguel Ángel Díaz Díaz	(Paraguay) Gustavo Benítez		Austral	Cantabria
Rayo Vallecano	(Spain) Teresa Rivero	(Spain) Juande Ramos		Joma	Rumasa
Real Madrid	(Spain) Lorenzo Sanz	(Wales) John Toshack		Adidas	Teka
Real Sociedad	(Spain) Luis Uranga	(Austria) Bernd Krauss		Astore	Krafft
Sevilla	(Spain) Rafael Carrión	(Spain) Marcos Alonso		Umbro	SuperCable
Valencia	(Spain) Pedro Cortés	(Argentina) Héctor Cúper		Luanvi	Terra Mítica
Valladolid	(Spain) Marcos Fernández	(Spain) Gregorio Manzano		Kelme	Caja España
Zaragoza	(Spain) Alfonso Soláns	(Spain) Chechu Rojo		Luanvi	Pikolin

=== Clubs and locations ===
Location of teams in La Liga 1999–2000

1999–2000 season was composed of the following clubs:

Team	Stadium	Capacity
Barcelona	Camp Nou	98,772
Real Madrid	Santiago Bernabéu	80,354
Espanyol	Estadi Olímpic de Montjuïc	55,926
Atlético Madrid	Vicente Calderón	55,005
Valencia	Mestalla	55,000
Real Betis	Manuel Ruiz de Lopera	52,132
Sevilla	Ramón Sánchez Pizjuán	45,500
Athletic Bilbao	San Mamés	39,750
Deportivo de La Coruña	Riazor	34,600
Real Zaragoza	La Romareda	34,596
Celta de Vigo	Estadio Balaídos	32,500
Real Sociedad	Anoeta	32,200
Real Oviedo	Carlos Tartiere	30,500
Málaga	La Rosaleda	30,044
Valladolid	José Zorrilla	27,846
Mallorca	Son Moix	23,142
Racing de Santander	El Sardinero	22,222
Alavés	Mendizorrotza	19,840
Rayo Vallecano	Campo de Fútbol de Vallecas	14,505
Numancia	Los Pajaritos	8,261

=== Managerial changes ===
Team	Outgoing manager	Manner of departure	Date of vacancy	Incoming manager	Date of appointment	Position in table
Mallorca	(Argentina) Mario Gómez		August 1999	(Spain) Fernando Vázquez	September 1999	19th
Real Sociedad	(Germany) Bernd Krauss	Sacked	25 October 1999	(Spain) Javier Clemente	26 October 1999	17th
Real Madrid	(Wales) John Toshack	Sacked	17 November 1999	(Spain) Vicente del Bosque	18 November 1999	8th
Espanyol	(Argentina) Miguel Ángel Brindisi	Sacked	17 January 2000	(Spain) Paco Flores	January 2000	17th
Betis	(Argentina) Carlos Griguol	Sacked	January 2000	(Netherlands) Guus Hiddink	February 2000	16th
Atlético Madrid	(Italy) Claudio Ranieri	Sacked	February 2000	(Serbia and Montenegro) Radomir Antić	March 2000	17th
Sevilla	(Spain) Marcos Alonso Peña	Sacked	March 2000	(Spain) Juan Carlos Álvarez	March 2000	20th
Betis	(Netherlands) Guus Hiddink	Sacked	2 May 2000	(Bosnia and Herzegovina) Faruk Hadžibegić	May 2000	18th
Atlético Madrid	(Serbia and Montenegro) Radomir Antić	Sacked	May 2000	(Spain) Fernando Zambrano	May 2000	19th

== League table ==
Pos	Team	Pld	W	D	L	GF	GA	GD	Pts	Qualification or relegation
1	Deportivo La Coruña (C)	38	21	6	11	66	44	+22	69	Qualification for the Club World Cup and Champions League group stage
2	Barcelona	38	19	7	12	70	46	+24	64 (Note: VAL 3–1 BAR; BAR 3–0 VAL)	Qualification for the Champions League group stage
3	Valencia	38	18	10	10	59	39	+20	64	Qualification for the Champions League third qualifying round
4	Zaragoza	38	16	15	7	60	40	+20	63	Qualification for the UEFA Cup first round (Note: Real Madrid qualified directly for the 2000–01 UEFA Champions League as holders. As a result, Zaragoza lost their spot in the UEFA Champions League and had to participate in the UEFA Cup.)
5	Real Madrid	38	16	14	8	58	48	+10	62	Qualification for the Champions League group stage
6	Alavés	38	17	10	11	41	37	+4	61	Qualification for the UEFA Cup first round
7	Celta Vigo	38	15	8	15	45	43	+2	53 (Note: VLD 3–3 CEL; CEL 1–1 VLD)	Qualification for the Intertoto Cup third round
8	Valladolid	38	14	11	13	36	44	−8	53	
9	Rayo Vallecano	38	15	7	16	51	53	−2	52	Qualification for the UEFA Cup qualifying round (Note: Rayo Vallecano earned a spot in the qualifying round of the 2000–01 UEFA Cup as being elected by UEFA as one of the two best entries of UEFA Fair play.)
10	Mallorca	38	14	9	15	52	45	+7	51	Qualification for the Intertoto Cup second round
11	Athletic Bilbao	38	12	14	12	47	57	−10	50	
12	Málaga	38	11	15	12	55	50	+5	48	
13	Real Sociedad	38	11	14	13	42	49	−7	47 (Note: ESP 0–0 RSO; RSO 1–0 ESP)	
14	Espanyol	38	12	11	15	51	48	+3	47	Qualification for the UEFA Cup first round (Note: Espanyol entered UEFA Cup as winners of 1999–2000 Copa del Rey.)
15	Racing Santander	38	10	16	12	52	50	+2	46	
16	Oviedo	38	11	12	15	44	60	−16	45 (Note: ROV 1–0 NUM; NUM 1–1 ROV)	
17	Numancia	38	11	12	15	47	59	−12	45	
18	Real Betis (R)	38	11	9	18	33	56	−23	42	Relegation to the Segunda División
19	Atlético Madrid (R)	38	9	11	18	48	64	−16	38	Relegation to the Segunda División
20	Sevilla (R)	38	5	13	20	42	67	−25	28	Relegation to the Segunda División

Source: LFP
Rules for classification: 1) points; 2) head-to-head points; 3) head-to-head goal difference; 4) head-to-head goals scored; 5) goal difference; 6) number of goals scored.
(C) Champions; (R) Relegated

== Results ==
The season results are as follows:

Home \ Away	ATH	ATM	FCB	BET	CEL	ALV	RCD	ESP	MCF	MLL	NUM	RAC	RVA	RMA	ROV	RSO	SFC	VCF	VLD	ZAR
Athletic Bilbao		4–2	0–4	1–0	1–0	2–1	2–3	2–1	2–2	1–1	2–1	2–2	1–2	2–2	1–1	1–1	1–1	1–0	1–0	2–2
Atlético Madrid	1–2		0–3	0–0	1–2	1–0	1–3	1–1	2–2	1–0	2–2	2–0	0–2	1–1	5–0	1–1	1–1	1–2	3–1	2–2
Barcelona	4–0	2–1		4–1	2–2	0–1	2–1	3–0	1–2	0–3	4–0	1–0	0–2	2–2	3–2	3–1	2–0	3–0	4–0	2–0
Betis	2–1	2–1	2–1		0–0	0–1	0–0	2–5	0–0	1–0	1–2	2–2	1–1	0–2	1–0	1–0	1–1	1–0	0–1	2–0
Celta de Vigo	1–1	0–1	0–2	5–1		1–1	2–1	2–1	2–4	1–0	0–0	2–0	0–1	1–0	5–3	4–1	2–1	0–0	1–1	2–1
Alavés	1–2	2–0	2–3	2–0	1–0		2–1	0–0	2–1	2–2	2–2	2–1	0–1	1–3	1–0	2–1	0–0	0–1	1–0	0–2
Deportivo La Coruña	2–0	4–1	2–1	2–0	1–0	4–1		2–0	4–1	2–1	0–2	0–3	3–2	5–2	3–1	2–0	5–2	2–0	2–0	2–2
Espanyol	0–0	3–1	1–1	3–0	3–0	2–3	0–0		0–2	1–2	3–1	1–0	5–1	0–2	2–1	0–0	2–2	3–2	1–1	1–1
Málaga	3–4	2–3	1–2	3–0	0–1	0–1	1–0	1–0		0–0	3–1	0–0	2–0	1–1	4–0	0–0	3–0	1–1	0–0	0–0
Mallorca	2–1	1–2	3–2	4–0	1–0	2–0	2–2	1–3	2–1		3–0	1–2	2–1	1–2	1–1	2–1	3–1	1–0	0–0	1–1
Numancia	1–1	3–0	3–3	1–2	3–1	0–0	1–0	2–0	1–1	3–1		2–1	3–1	0–0	1–1	1–2	2–0	1–2	1–0	1–2
Racing Santander	2–2	2–1	1–2	1–1	3–0	0–0	0–0	2–2	2–3	1–1	1–1		1–1	1–1	3–1	0–0	2–2	1–1	1–1	1–2
Rayo Vallecano	1–2	1–1	1–1	1–3	1–0	0–1	2–0	2–1	4–1	2–1	0–0	1–2		2–3	1–2	2–1	2–0	1–3	4–1	0–1
Real Madrid	3–1	1–3	3–0	2–1	1–0	0–1	1–1	2–1	1–0	2–1	4–1	2–4	0–0		2–2	1–1	3–1	2–3	0–1	1–5
Oviedo	1–0	2–2	3–0	1–1	1–0	1–0	0–1	1–0	2–2	0–0	1–0	1–2	2–0	1–1		0–1	4–2	0–0	1–1	1–0
Real Sociedad	4–1	4–1	0–0	1–0	0–2	1–1	0–1	1–3	2–2	2–1	2–1	2–5	2–1	1–1	0–0		1–1	0–0	3–0	2–1
Sevilla	0–0	2–1	3–2	3–0	0–1	2–2	1–3	1–2	0–0	0–4	4–0	1–0	2–3	1–1	2–3	2–2		1–2	0–1	0–0
Valencia	2–0	2–0	3–1	3–1	1–1	0–2	2–0	1–2	2–2	1–0	4–0	1–2	3–1	1–1	6–2	4–0	2–0		0–0	2–1
Valladolid	1–0	1–0	0–2	0–3	1–3	1–1	4–1	1–0	4–2	2–1	2–0	1–0	1–2	0–1	2–1	2–1	2–1	0–0		1–1
Zaragoza	0–0	1–1	0–0	1–0	2–1	2–1	2–1	1–1	3–2	3–0	3–3	4–1	1–1	0–1	4–0	2–0	2–1	4–2	1–1	

Source: LFP (in Spanish)
Legend: Blue = home team win; Yellow = draw; Red = away team win.

== Overall ==
- Most wins – Deportivo La Coruña (21)
- Fewest wins – Sevilla (5)
- Most draws – Racing Santander (16)
- Fewest draws – Deportivo La Coruña (6)
- Most losses – Sevilla (20)
- Fewest losses – Zaragoza (7)
- Most goals scored – Barcelona (70)
- Fewest goals scored – Betis (33)
- Most goals conceded – Sevilla (67)
- Fewest goals conceded – Alavés (37)

== Awards and season statistics ==
=== Top goalscorers ===
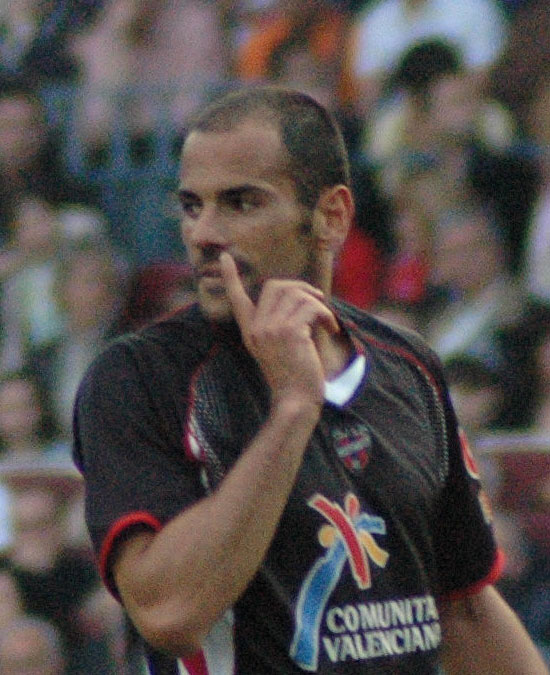
Salva was the top goalscorer of the 1999–2000 season

Rank	Player	Club	Goals
1	(Spain) Salva	Racing Santander	27
2	(Brazil) Catanha	Málaga	24
2	(Netherlands) Jimmy Floyd Hasselbaink	Atlético Madrid	24
4	(Netherlands) Roy Makaay	Deportivo La Coruña	22
5	(Federal Republic of Yugoslavia) Savo Milošević	Zaragoza	21
6	(Spain) Diego Tristán	Mallorca	18
7	(Spain) Raúl	Real Madrid	17
8	(Netherlands) Patrick Kluivert	Barcelona	15
9	(Spain) Gaizka Mendieta	Valencia	13
9	(Spain) Víctor	Valladolid	13

Source: BDFutbol

=== Zamora Trophy ===
Player	Club	Goals against	Matches	Average
(Argentina) Martín Herrera	Alavés	37	38	0.97

=== Fair Play award ===
Rayo Vallecano was the winner of the Fair-play award with 102 points; moreover, it was elected on 8 June 2000 in Brussels as one of the three entries by UEFA to enter UEFA Cup in the qualifying round by the same condition of Fair Play.

- Source: El Mundo Deportivo (newspaper archive, web)

=== Pedro Zaballa award ===
Alfonso Pérez, footballer

== Attendances ==
#	Club	Avg. attendance	Highest
1	FC Barcelona	65,526	100,000
2	Real Madrid	59,316	80,000
3	Valencia CF	40,368	50,000
4	Real Betis	38,684	45,000
5	Atlético de Madrid	35,211	55,000
6	Athletic Club	34,474	40,000
7	Sevilla FC	29,353	43,000
8	Málaga CF	27,526	37,000
9	Deportivo de La Coruña	27,211	36,000
10	Real Sociedad	25,221	30,000
11	Celta de Vigo	22,711	30,000
12	Real Zaragoza	22,000	33,000
13	RCD Espanyol	18,900	33,400
14	Deportivo Alavés	17,158	19,000
15	RCD Mallorca	16,384	23,000
16	Racing de Santander	15,820	22,000
17	Real Valladolid	13,326	21,000
18	Real Oviedo	11,705	15,024
19	Rayo Vallecano	9,737	14,500
20	CD Numancia	9,042	10,000

== See also ==
- 1999–2000 Segunda División
- 1999–2000 Copa del Rey
