= History of Club Atlético River Plate =

The first known logo of River Plate, dated 1914. It follows an Art Nouveau style.

The history of Club Atlético River Plate covers over 120 years of the professional Argentine sports club based in the Belgrano barrio of Buenos Aires. River Plate is best known for its professional association football department, which has won Argentina's Primera División championship a record 38 times, most recently in the 2023 campaign. They have also won 16 national cups, making River Argentina's most successful team in domestic competitions with 54 titles in total. At international level, River have won 18 titles, including four Copa Libertadores, one Intercontinental Cup, one Supercopa Sudamericana, one Copa Sudamericana, three Recopa Sudamericanas, one Copa Interamericana, one Suruga Bank Championship, a record five Copa Aldaos, and one Tie Cup.

Founded in 1901 or 1904 (Note: See the second paragraph of the "Foundation" section for more information.) in the times of the Amateur era, the club was promoted to the first division 1909, where they managed to finish as runners-up as underdogs. In the next decade, River Plate consolidated themselves as a competitor for the league titles as they never exited the top five and won their first two trophies: the Copa Competencia and the Tie Cup. In the first years of the professional era, started in 1931, they won three league championships and signed Bernabé Ferreyra for a then world record transfer fee. The 1940s saw "La Máquina", a ten title winning squad including the likes of Juan Carlos Muñoz, José Manuel Moreno, Adolfo Pedernera, Ángel Labruna, Félix Loustau, Alfredo Di Stefano, and Omar Sivori; considered one of the best of all times. A great drought of titles occurred between 1957 and 1975, until it was cut by Labruna, now the head coach, in which his team won the 1975 Metropolitano championship along with five more titles in the years that followed. The 1980s to 1990s saw great periods of international and domestic success as they won the 1986 Copa Libertadores, the 1986 Intercontinental Cup versus Steaua București, the 1996 Copa Libertadores, and three straight champions between 1996 and 1998. Nevertheless, troubled times came in the 2000s and early 2010s; in 2011, River Plate was relegated to the second division for their first and only time in their history after failing to win a relegation play-off against CA Belgrano. The club only remained in the lower leagues for a year; the appointment of Marcelo Gallardo saw a new period of great success as he became the manager with the most trophies won in the club's history, with fourteen.

== Amateur era (1901–1931) ==
=== Foundation ===
The Wilson, Sons coal yard in Buenos Aires, where Santa Rosa originated. Highlighted in a red circle is La Rosales's field, these two clubs merged to found River Plate in 1901 or 1904.

In the early months of 1901, in the barrio of La Boca, groups of adolescents started playing football as a social activity and forming two clubs: Santa Rosa and La Rosales. Santa Rosa originated with three boys, Leopoldo Bard; Enrique Salvarezza and Enrique Balza, who used to meet each other in the deposit of the Wilson, Sons' deputy manager, Alberto Jacobs, in the Dársanera Sur to learn English and socialise. Bard suggested playing football to the group, attracting several local youth and leading to the club's formal establishment. Only a hundred meters from Santa Rosa was Club La Rosales, founded by fourteen boys who socialised at a residence on Almirante Brown Street. Many of the members of both clubs were sons of immigrants or middle-class; Santa Rosa included Bard, an Austro-Hungarian Jew, and Isidoro Kitzler, an Indian born in Mumbai during the times of the British Raj. Meanwhile, almost all members in La Rosales were sons of immigrants from the Italian or Spanish diaspora.

As a friendship of both teams grew, Kitzler proposed to merge the both teams, which resulted in the foundation of Club Atlético River Plate. Its foundation date remains disputed; the date of 25 May 1901 is sustained by River Plate since 1912, while in 2004, the Centro para la Investigación de la Historia del Fútbol (CIHF) proposed 15 May 1904 as the true date of foundation following an investigation of a variety of secondary and primary contemporary sources that repudiated the official date. The new club was chose its name following a collective vote where "River Plate" came out victorious after beating the other candidates of "Forward" and "Juventud Boquense". Pedro Martínez, one of the founding members, came up with the name after he had seen boxes in the Dique 3 dock in Buenos Aires, listed as "The River Plate", an alternative name for Río de la Plata, while construction workers of the place were playing a football match in their spare time. Bard was chosen to serve as the club's first president. He would later become a congressman for the Unión Cívica Radical (UCR). La Rosales' field was used as the club's first ground, designed by founding member Bernardo Messina, which was located on Dársena Sud of the Port of Buenos Aires, just behind the Wilson, Sons' coal yards. Managers of the yard and family members of the team's players helped to maintain the stadium by adding goals, posts and wire fencing. According to Bard, the red stripe on River's shirt was made from left-overs of red fabric found in a cart belonging to the coal yard, which was then made into stripes and added on top of white shirts that the club was using to play their matches. Following match reports from El Diario and La Argeñtina, presented by the CIHF, River Plate played its first game on 28 May 1904, thirteen days after its foundation, against General Mitre in 1–0 victory. On 11 June, a 3–0 defeat versus Racing Club would become the club's second match.

=== Amateur competitions ===
==== Years in the lower leagues (1905–1908) ====
River Plate players training in the club's first field in their first competitive season in 1905.

In 1905, River Plate became affiliated to the Argentine Football Association (AFA) and inscribed itself to play in zone A of the third division in the same year. On 30 April, they debuted against Asociación de Medicina in a 2–3 loss with the following line-up: S. Zanni; Ceballos and Tarrico; Bard, Moltedo and Juanich; Kitzler, Martínez, Rolón, Flores and Enrique Zanni. The team finished second to last in their zone, with Colegio Militar being behind them with zero points. In the following year, the Minister of Agriculture of Argentina ordered the eviction of the stadium's land. This was a common occurrence for amateur teams founded by young men at the time, as a great part of them had difficulties obtaining their own lands to dispute their matches in. José Bernasconi, director of the Naval storage company "Dresco", gave the club land near the bridge of Sarandí in Greater Buenos Aires, therefore River Plate moved there to play its home games. River Plate registered a team to play in the second division for their second campaign in the AFA, where it had another poor performance, losing 7 of the 12 matches featured across the season. By that time, members of the club proposed to return to the same field in Dársena Sud because the field had not been replaced by the Government. As a result, River Plate returned to its first field.

After gaining promotion, Nacional de Floresta made their debut in the top fight in the 1908 season; however, after disputing two matches, the AFA decided to revoke the team's affiliation to the organisation. This was consequential to a tree near the stadium's regulatory boundaries, deemed as a possible danger to players, that couldn't be removed due to Nacional not owning the landmass where their games where they played in. The final decision would be taken on 2 June, and as multiple of Nacional's players wanted to continue playing the sport, River Plate decided to take advantage of this by incorporating the club's best players for their second division campaign of 1908. River, that had already commenced its season, had four wins in a row before the incorporation of Nacional's players and were on top of its group with eight points. Their following league match was against Estudiantil Porteño's B team, marking Nacional's players debut in the league season after the players had lost to Quilmes' secondary team in the Copa Bullrich. They went on to win with a shattering 5–0 and continued to win across the season, qualifying for the promotion play-offs and topping group B with 33 points and one loss.

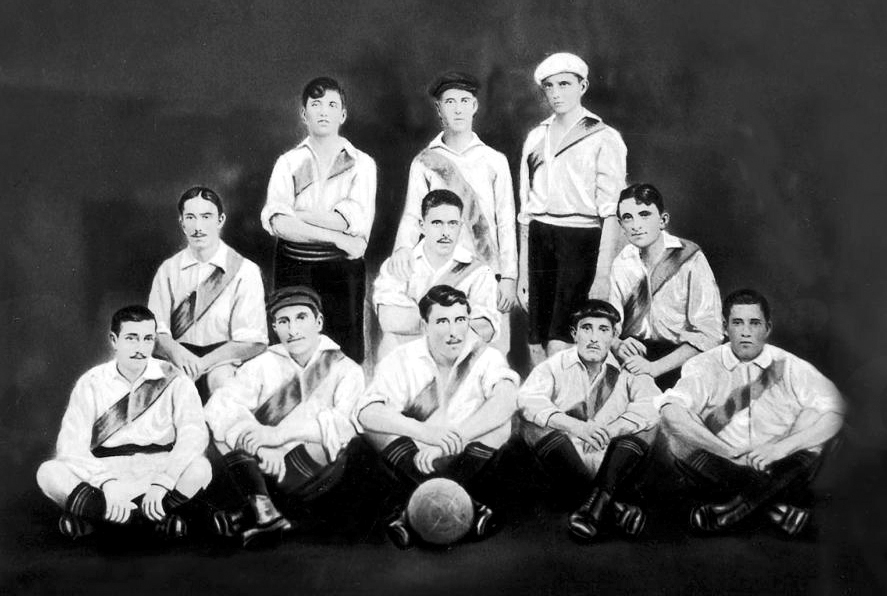
The team that achieved the promotion to first division in 1908.

For the play-off semifinal, River Plate confronted Ferro Carril Oeste and exited with a 5–1 victory over the opposing team. The final was played on December 13, 1908, at GEBA Stadium, where River defeated Racing Club by 2–1 after extra time. However, the match was declared null due to River supporters jumped onto the field to celebrate with the players, so a new match had to be played. In the second game (held on December 27), River Plate defeated Racing Club again with a hammering 7–0, therefore promoting to Primera División. The line-up for that game was Luraschi; Chiappe, Politano; Messina, Morroni, Chagneaud; Anempodisto García, Griffero, Abaca Gómez, Elías Fernández, Priano.

==== Ups and downs during first years in the top flight (1909–1913) ====
As underdogs, River Plate kicked off their debut season in the top flight with four wins and two draws, only losing their unbeaten run against Alumni Athletic Club. Nevertheless, this loss briefly engulfed the team's morale, which led River to be successively thrashed by Belgrano Athletic Club in 6–0 and 1–4 losses. In spite of the heavy losses, River Plate bounced back and continued to gain positive results across the season. Although they suffered two more losses against San Isidro and Porteño, the club would go on to finish second with twenty-four points, eight points behind Alumni, the league's champion. However, in national cups, the team gave disappointing performances, exiting the Copa de Honor in the first round and the Copa Competencia in the round of 16. For the following sixteen game season, higher expectations were met due to the club's notable debut in the first division. River Plate delivered during the first half of its campaign; however, poor results during the later half the team a poor result on the table, finishing the league season third to last and exiting the Copa de Honor and Copa Competencia early on. The 1911 season gave similar results, although they responded to the previous season with a midtable finish.

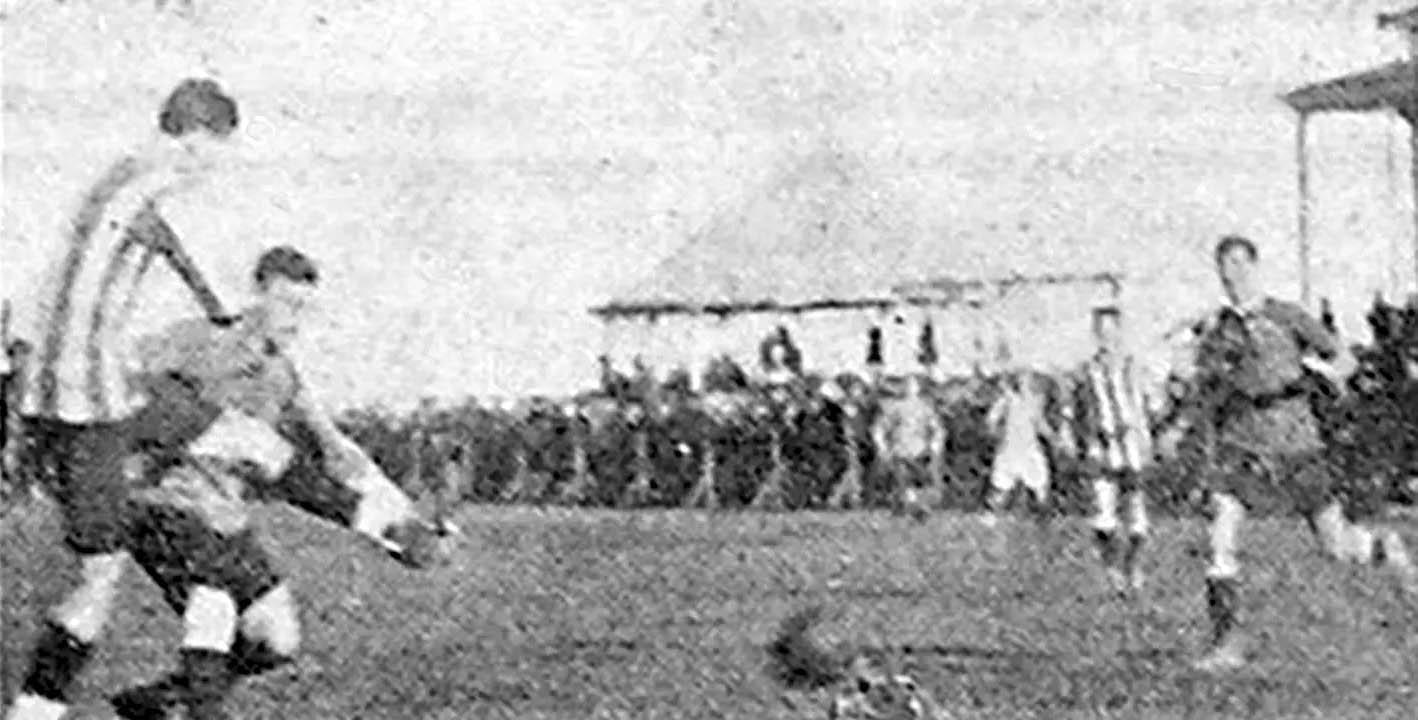
River Plate (white and red) disputing the first official Superclásico against rivals Boca Juniors (blue and yellow), 1913.

Subsequent to the 1911 season, the 1912 campaign, followed the first breakup in Argentine football, that founded the Federación Argentina de Football, splitting from the AFA. The league was formed of only six teams, playing only ten matches and had no promotion or relegation system. River Plate had a dreadful campaign, winning only three matches, suffering a humiliating 10–1 defeat against Belgrano AC and were knocked out of both Copa de Honor and Copa Competición in the first round. The stadium of the club was expanded in the year as president Antonio Zolezzi requested m$n3,000 from the municipal government of La Boca to build stands. In the 1913 season, the AFA, now called the Asociación Argentina de Football (AAF), incorporated nine more teams for the league. However, this strained organization, so the collective decided to divide the league mid-season into two groups that would fight to qualify for a final that would decide the season's winner and a group that would fight for relegation. River Plate's stadium was severely damaged by a cyclone on 13 March 1913; the local government ordered the eviction from the lands and the club was forced to play in Ferro Carril Oeste's stadium. Nonetheless, the season had already started and the squad went unbeaten in their matches previous to the organization of groups, in these results are included a 2–1 win against Boca Juniors in the first official Superclásico and two 4–0 wins along with a 5–0 victory against Estudiantes de Buenos Aires, Riachuelo, and Olivos respectably were included. The darsaneros (Note: This is an old nickname for the club used until 1931, in reference to their first stadium.), placed in group A, won their two following matches against Belgrano AC and Platense and tied against Racing Club on the final matchday. However, River Plate was tied on points with the latter team and thus had to play a rematch to decide who would qualify for the final; River Plate lost the match 3–0, and their dreams of a championship were lost. In all domestic cups, they were eliminated early on by Estudiantes de Buenos Aires.

===== Consolidation (1914–1923) =====
During the remaining years of the decade, Racing Club would dominate the domestic league, winning seven straight championships (including the 1913 season). On the other hand, River Plate's campaign of 1913 helped the team to establish themselves consistently in the top of the league; finishing runners-up twice in 1917 and 1918, never exiting the top five. During this time, both in 1914, they had won their first trophies, the Copa Competencia and the Tie Cup after beating Newell's Old Boys 4–0 and Uruguayan team Bristol F.C respectably. River Plate constructed a new stadium in La Boca in 1915, where they would play here until the early 1920s.

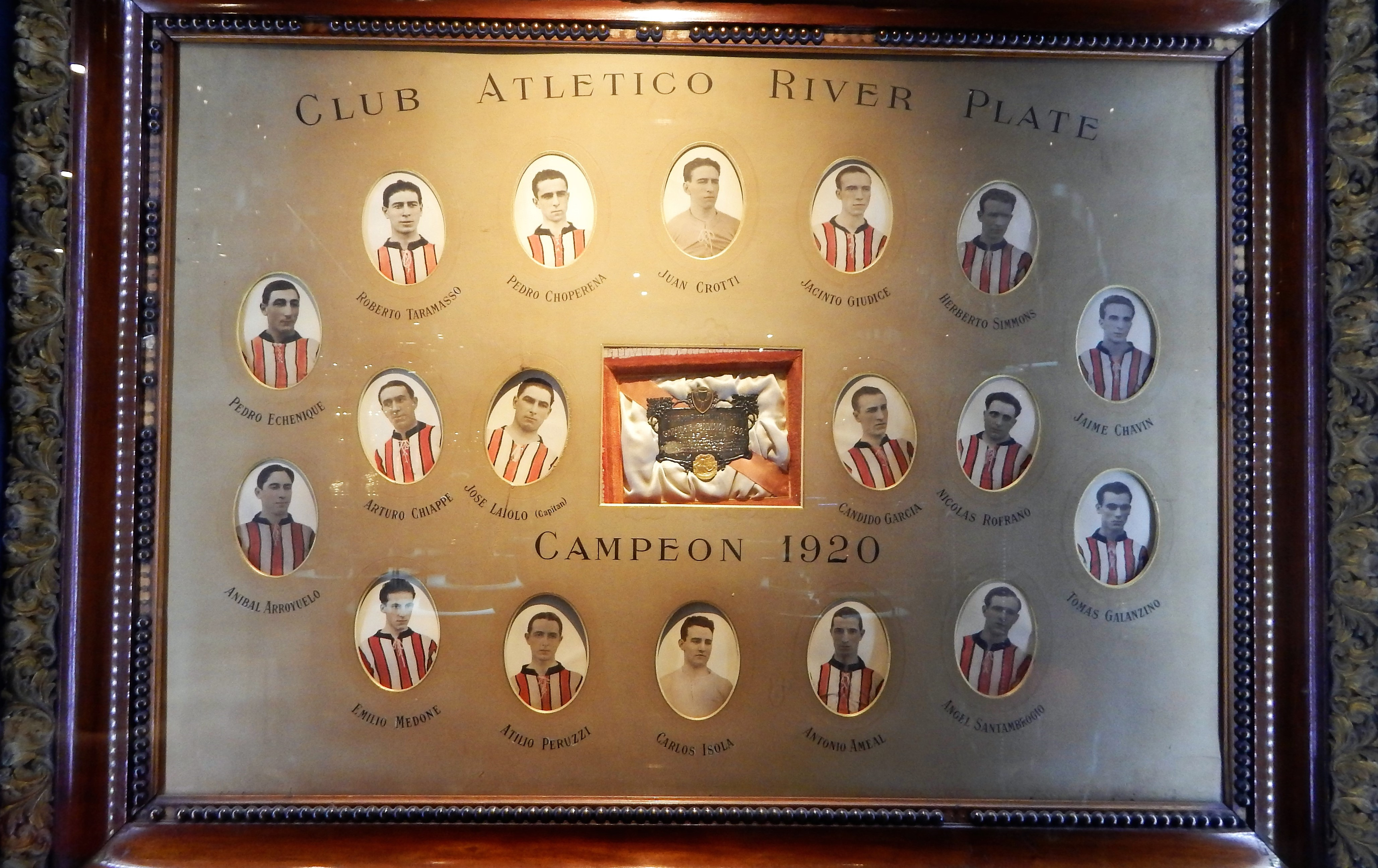
A frame picturing the River Plate squad that won the 1920 league championship, the first in the club's history.

Following a fourth-place finish in 1919, River Plate started the thirty-four game season with a ten-match unbeaten streak, which was eventually snapped by a 0–3 home defeat to San Isidro. The next following seven matches were marked with a quivering form; nonetheless, in the second half of the campaign the team maintained strong performance and entered a tight title race versus Racing Club. Near the end of the season, the darsaneros performed consistently well, as they went unbeaten in their last twelve games. The championship had to be decided in the last fixture, where River Plate became league champions for the first time in their history, following a 1–0 win against Quilmes. The league winners accumulated fifty-six points, concluding the season with three losses (San Isidro, Gimnasia (LP), and Racing Club), six draws, and twenty-five wins. Racing Club, the runners-up, finished their campaign with fifty-four points, two points below the league winner. Despite this successful year, River Plate was eliminated early on in the Round of 32 of the 1920 Copa Competencia by Rosario Central. After this successful campaign, River Plate arrived in a comfortable manner for the 1921 Argentine Primera División. Various changes were made to the structure of the league: a system round-robin format with two rounds of fixtures, along with an expansion to twenty teams, was implemented. Their 1921 campaign was marked by a second place finish, twelve points behind league champions Racing Club. A similar campaign was made in the following season where River Plate finished as runners-ups with a four point difference between first time champions Independiente.

In the first years of the 1920s, River Plate started to grow in popularity; 3,493 people had signed up to become members in 1922, a then all-time peak and 2,413 more than the previous year. On 20 May 1923, River Plate inaugurated a new stadium in the Recoleta barrio of Buenos Aires, at the intersection of the Alvear and Tagle avenues, on rented lands owned by the Buenos Aires and Pacific Railway company. The Alvear y Tagle, as colloquially known, started construction in 1922 and offered a capacity of 58,000 along with exclusive services for members, such as a basketball court, four tennis and three bocce courts, a swimming pool, an equipped gymnasium, a playground, and classes of foreign languages.

==== Last years of the amateur era (1924–1931) ====
In the previous seasons, River Plate had maintained great performances; however, this changed during the 1925 campaign. They free-falled to a seventeenth place finish and wasn't able to enter the top five until 1929, where they finished as runners-up with only one point behind champions Gimnasia (LP). The following year they made a third place finish.

== Early professionalism and "Los Millonarios" (1931–1939) ==
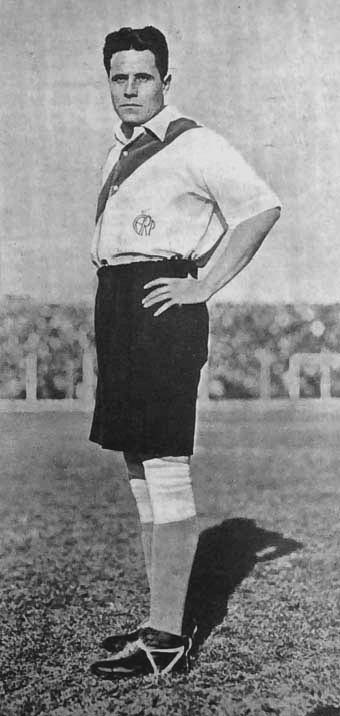
River Plate were nicknamed Los Millonarios for its spending power during the first years of professionalism. Among the notable purchases was the signing of Bernabé Ferreyra (pictured), which at the time broke the world transfer record.

With the establishment of the professionalism in 1931, River Plate started its first season under the new with the signing right winger Carlos Peucelle in for m$n10,000 from Sportivo Buenos Aires, an extraordinary sum at the time. Meanwhile, Víctor Caamaño was hired to be the club's first official head coach. The new darsanero team started the season with a great start; winning their first four matches. Still, upset defeats against Chacarita Juniors, and Quilmes, and Platense shortly after the winning streak occurred along with the loss of three points due to incidents in the Superclásico, led the way to a fourth place. Six points behind bitter-rivals Boca Juniors, who became the league's champions.

For the following campaign, River Plate brought six players into the squad, these were the likes of Alberto Cuello, Juan Arrillaga, Carlos Santamaría, Roberto Basílico, Oscar Sciarra, and Bernabé Ferreyra. This last m$n35,000 transfer of Tigre's centre-forward broke the world record of most expensive football transfer, it would take twenty years for this fee to be reached again in Argentine football. This new buying power early in the professional era gained them the nickname "Los Millonarios" ("The Millionaires") from journalist Hugo Marini, which has remained ever since. The River Plate campaign of 1932 started with an unbeaten streak of fifteen matches, including twelve wins and three draws, with Ferreyra's twenty-two goals as the team's haulier. Following a 5–0 defeat by Independiente, Caamaño's squad started to drop points versus mediocre teams and went on to lose the year's Superclásico versus Boca Juniors. The club's hope of a second championship seemed unlikely, but Independiente lost two straight matches and River Plate was able to catch them. Both teams finished the season with fifty points, meaning that a play-off match had to be played to decide the league's champions. After goals from Ferreyra, Peucelle, and Ricardo Zatelli, River Plate became champions following a 3–0 victory against the Avellaneda team. Ferreyra received the title of the league's top goalscorer, with forty-three goals. In domestic cups, Los Millonarios were able to replicate this success as they won the Copa de Competencia following a 3–1 triumph Estudiantes de La Plata in the final, played at the Viejo Gasometro.

River obtained two championships in the 1936 season, the "Copa Campeonato" (regular season) and the "Copa de Oro" after defeating San Lorenzo in the final game. That same year River Plate won its first Copa Aldao (played between the Argentine and Uruguay champions) after thrashing Peñarol by 5–1 in Montevideo.

The following year River won the league title again, totalling 58 points in 34 matches, having scored 106 goals and only conceding 43. José Manuel Moreno was the top scorer with 37 goals. Other notable players were Adolfo Pedernera, Renato Cesarini and José María Minella. The team not only won the league but the Copa Aldao, defeating Peñarol again by 5–2 in Estadio Gasómetro of Buenos Aires. That same year the club also won the Copa Ibarguren in 1937, with a large victory of 5–0 over Rosario Central at Estadio Gasómetro.

On 25 May 1938, the Estadio Monumental is officially opened, with a match between River and Peñarol, which River won 3–1.

== "La Máquina" (1940s) ==
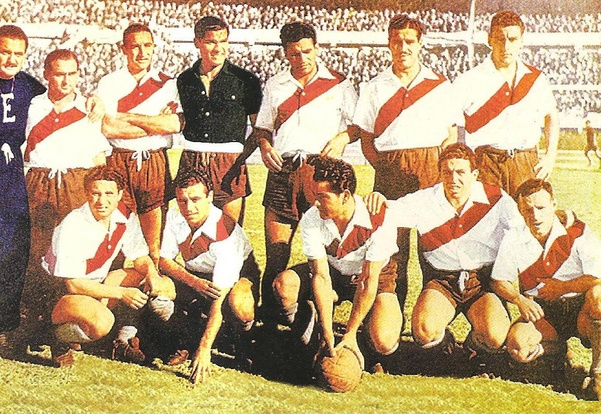
In 1945 River won a league title and the Copa Aldao.

The decade of the 1940s is considered as one of the best eras in the history of the club, having won the league titles of 1941 (44 points, 19 wins, 6 draws and 5 losses; 75 goals scored) and 1942 (46 points, 20–6–4, 79 goals), national cups Carlos Ibarguren (1941–42) and Adrián Escobar (1941) and the international Copa Aldao in 1941, 1945 and 1947.

1941 was one of the most successful years in club's history, so River Plate won four titles, the local championship, its third Copa Aldao defining the series against Nacional in two matches (with a thrashing 6–1 in the first game) and the Copa Ibarguren defeating Newell's Old Boys by 3–0 and the Copa Adrián C. Escobar beating Huracán. Four years later, River won two titles else, the 1945 league championship and another Copa Aldao defeating Peñarol for the third consecutive time (the squad won both games, in Montevideo and Buenos Aires).

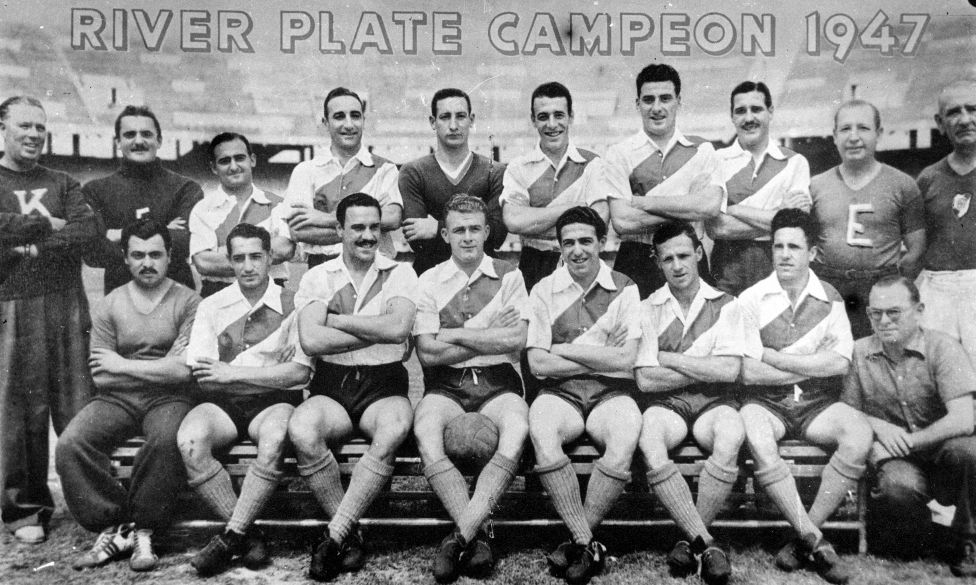
In 1947 River repeated the league title and the Copa Aldao. Alfredo Di Stéfano was the top scorer.

River would win its third Copa Ibarguren the following year, thrashing a Córdoba Province representative team by 7–0 in the final game.

The team were also runners-up in 1943 and 1944. River had a powerful attack nicknamed "La Máquina" ("The Machine"). The forwards were Juan Carlos Muñoz, José Manuel Moreno, Adolfo Pedernera, Ángel Labruna and Félix Loustau. That offensive line became a legend despite only playing 18 matches together. In 1945 River won another title, with Labruna being the top scorer with 25 goals. Moreno had left the club but other players (such as center-midfielder Néstor Rossi) had arrived.

In 1947 River won a new league championship with 48 points, totaling 90 goals scored and only conceding 30. Some emerging players were goalkeeper Amadeo Carrizo and center-forward Alfredo Di Stéfano, which came from the youth categories. Di Stéfano was River top-scorer with 27 goals. The squad also won its 5th. Copa Aldao after defeating Nacional at the finals.

After a footballers strike in 1948 many footballers went to Colombia, "Pipo" Rossi and Di Stefano were among them. River finished the 1948 and 1949 tournaments in 2nd position.

== First treble (1950s) ==
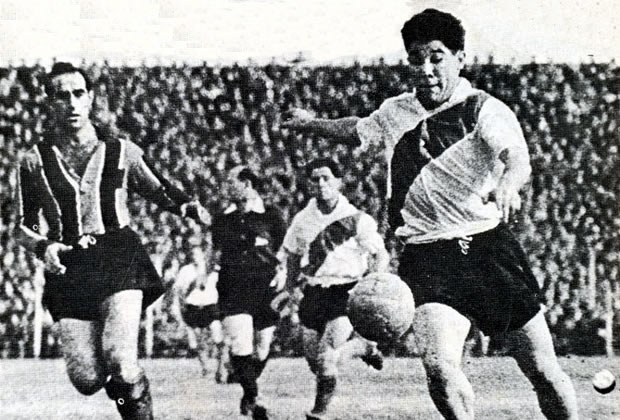
Omar Sívori won 3 league titles with River Plate. His transfer to Juventus gave River enough money to finish the Estadio Monumental grandstands.

River went to a European tour in 1951 and the next year the team became the champion. River totalized 40 points, with 17 matches won, 6 draws and 7 losses. That team was nicknamed "La Máquina" ("The Machine") and had Labruna, Uruguayan Walter Gómez, Santiago Vernazza, Eliseo Prado, Lousteau and goalkeeper Carrizo as some of its most relevant players. In 1953 River won another title, with 60 goals scored and only conceding 36.

With the addition of "Pipo" Rossi (returned from Millonarios of Colombia), Federico Vairo (traded from Rosario Central) and the rise of Enrique Omar Sívori from the youth categories River won the 1955, 1956 and 1957 titles consecutively for the first time in the history of the club. River Plate would also win its sixth Copa Aldao in 1955 against Nacional, achieving a record for the tournament so this was the last year it was held.

After the 1957 South American Championship held in Lima, Peru, Sívori was acquired by Juventus FC paying $10 million. That amount of money was used by the club to finish the Estadio Monumental grandstands.

After the demise of the Argentina national team in the 1958 World Cup (where Labruna also played with #10 replacing Sívori) River would spend a long time without obtaining any title. On 12 October 1959, Angel Labruna retired from football at the age of 41. Labruna is still the all-time Argentine football top scorer (along with Independiente forward Arsenio Erico with 293 goals over 514 matches played). Moreover, Labruna was one of the greatest idols in River Plate's history.

== A decade without titles (1960s) ==
Scenes before the 1966 Copa Libertadores finals between River Plate and Peñarol. The Argentines lost the game 2–4 and the Uruguayans became champions.

River could not win any championship during the 1960s, although the team had many talented players such as Ermindo Onega, José Ramos Delgado, scorer Luis Artime, Vladislao Cap and Oscar Más. This is considered the worst club's age ever, which would last until 1975, totaling 18 years with no titles for the club.

River's best position during those years was the 2nd place. In 1962 the team lost the title at the hands of arch-rival Boca Juniors, with the famous penalty-shot stopped by Antonio Roma to Delem. Another chance lost was in 1968 when Vélez Sársfield finally won the championship in a mini-tournament organised in order to declare a champion (due to River, Vélez and Racing finished in equal first position at the end of the season). Another domestic title lost was the 1969 final against Chacarita Juniors, which beat River 4–1. River had left behind Boca Juniors in the semifinals by goal average after a 0–0 draw.

In 1966 River played the Copa Libertadores final against Uruguayan team Peñarol. River had finished the first half leading 2–0, but Peñarol scored two goals in the 2nd half so an extra time had to be played. Peñarol scored two goals more winning 4–2 and becoming the new South American champion. The team's performance in that match originated the pejorative nickname Gallinas ("Chicken") which has been used by rivals to refer to River's players and supporters and has remained since.

== Return to greatness (1970s) ==
Celebrations after River Plate's victory of the 1975 Torneo Metropolitano

In 1975 Angel Labruna became the team's coach. Under his command, River won a championship after 18 years without obtaining any title (in fact, River won two titles: 1975 Metropolitano and Nacional tournaments). Some of the most important players of that squad were goalkeeper Ubaldo Fillol, backs Roberto Perfumo and Daniel Passarella, midfielders Juan José López, Reinaldo "Mostaza" Merlo and Norberto Alonso and strikers Carlos Morete and Oscar Más.

In 1976 River reached the Copa Libertadores finals, where the squad faced Brazilian team Cruzeiro. After two matches ended with a victory per team, a third game had to be played in Santiago, Chile, and Cruzeiro beat River by 3–2.

River Plate also won the 1977 Metropolitano championship, with the same player structure than earlier years with the addition of striker Leopoldo Luque and left wing Oscar Ortiz. For the 1978 World Cup hosted in Argentina, River gave 5 players to the national team that would win the championship: Fillol, Luque, Passarella, Ortiz and Alonso.

In 1979 River achieved another treble, when winning the 1979 Metropolitano and Nacional and the 1980 Metropolitano tournaments. Some notable players during those seasons were Fillol, Alberto Tarantini, Luque, and Emilio Commisso.

Angel Labruna was not only River's all-time top scorer but he won 6 titles as coach of the first division team.

== First Copa Libertadores (1980s) ==
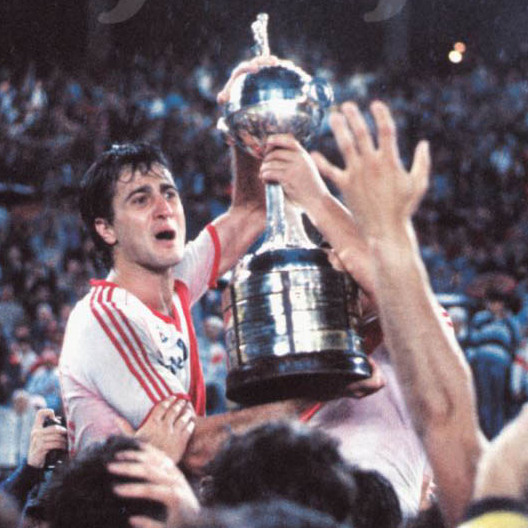
Norberto Alonso lifting the first Copa Libertadores in 1986.

By 1981 Alfredo Di Stéfano replaced Labruna as the coach, Boca Juniors acquired Diego Maradona, which caused a huge impact in Argentine football. To mitigate the effects of Boca's signing of Maradona, River hired national team top scorer and superstar Mario Kempes, apart from other players such as defender Julio Olarticoechea and Américo Gallego. With the addition of those players and based on a strong defensive line and an effective offensive with Kempes and a youth Ramón Díaz, River became 1981 Torneo Nacional champion, defeating Ferro Carril Oeste in the finals with the same score in both matches: 1–0. Norberto Alonso, one of the greatest idols in the history of the club, did not take part of the first team because he had left behind by Di Stefano.

In 1982 some of River players that had contributed to the recent championship, left the club: Alonso was traded to Vélez Sarsfield due to his conflicts with Di Stefano and Kempes returned to Valencia CF. Moreover, Ramón Díaz and Daniel Passarella were sold to Napoli and Fiorentina respectively. River Plate was eliminated from the Copa Libertadores at the hands of Flamengo and Peñarol (which would be the champion). In 1983 Fillol left the club because of an economic conflict with the institution.

With the sale of Alonso, River acquired Uruguayan midfielder Enzo Francescoli to replace him as playmaker. 1983 would be one of the worst in club's history, finishing 18th of 19. Rules indicated that the two teams that finished the season in the last position would be relegated to Primera B, but a restructure of the Argentine football league system introduced at the beginning of the season saved River from being relegated to the second division.

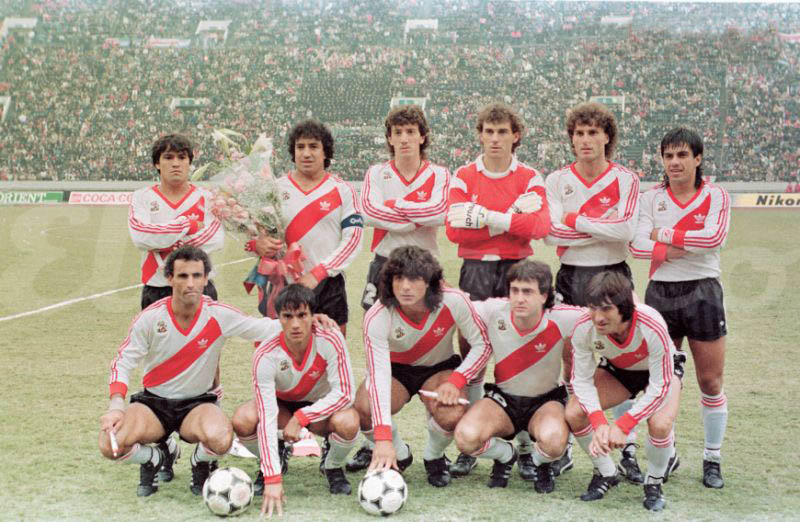
The team that won the Intercontinental Cup.

In 1984 Héctor Veira was hired as coach, with River finishing as the runner-up of the 1984 Torneo Nacional losing the final against Ferro Carril Oeste. In 1985 there was a restructure of the league system, and a new tournament was created, with a format similar to the European system. River won the first tournament, the 1985–86, being declared champion six games before the end of the season. The team won 23 games, with 10 draws and only 3 losses. Enzo Francescoli was the top-scorer.

In 1986 River won its first Copa Libertadores, defeating América de Cali in the finals (2–1 in Cali and 1–0 in Buenos Aires). River achieved its second international title, obtaining the Intercontinental Cup against Steaua București, which beat 1–0 in Tokyo. The team would close its most successful era in club's history winning the 1986 Copa Interamericana (played in 1987) against Costa Rica's L.D. Alajuelense. After Veira's departure, River appointed Carlos Griguol for the 1987–88 season, and César Menotti for the 1988–89 season as coaches. Although River acquired many renowned players such as Ángel Comizzo, Omar Palma, Claudio Borghi, Abel Balbo, Jorge da Silva and Daniel Passarella (who had returned from Italy), the team did not make a good performance.

== The success continues (1990s) ==
In 1990 Daniel Passarella is named coach, winning the 1989–90 tournament and reaching the Copa Libertadores semi-finals, being eliminated against Barcelona de Guayaquil. 1991 was the year which started the longest period of no victories against Boca Juniors: 13 matches. That year Ramón Díaz returned to the club, after his career in Europe, and River obtained the 1991 Apertura with Díaz as top scorer with 14 goals.

But Ramón Díaz emigrated again (this time to Yokohama Marinos) in 1993, nevertheless River won the 1993 Apertura with a team formed by youth promises such as Ariel Ortega, Marcelo Gallardo and Hernán Crespo.

In 1994 Enzo Francescoli returned to the club, winning another title that year with River Plate (the 1994 Apertura), along with Roberto Ayala and goalkeeper Germán Burgos (both acquired to Ferro) and being coached by former player Américo Gallego. River also remained unbeaten that season, for the first time in club's history.

After the brief Carlos Babington's run as coach, Ramón Díaz came to be his replacement in 1995. The following year River won its second Copa Libertadores, defeating América de Cali in the finals again ten years after. América won the first game 1–0 but River overcome 2–0 in Buenos Aires, winning the Cup by goal average. Hernán Crespo scored the two goals in the decisive match.

River would later win its third treble, obtaining the 1996 Apertura and 1997 Clausura and the 1997 Apertura. Internationally, River won (also for the first time in club's history) the 1997 Supercopa Sudamericana defeating São Paulo in the finals, with great performances of Marcelo Salas and Marcelo Gallardo. After the three championships and the Supercopa, Enzo Francéscoli retires, and River would overcome his missing two years later. The 1996/1997 River Plate team is considered among the best teams in South American football history, with stars like Francéscoli, Salas, Julio Cruz, Ariel Ortega, Marcelo Gallardo, Juan Pablo Sorín, Germán Burgos, Celso Ayala, Matías Almeyda, Sergio Berti or Santiago Solari.

In 1999 River won the last title under the coaching of Ramón Díaz, the Apertura tournament, with Javier Saviola as top-scorer with 15 goals. Saviola is also the youngest player to debut for River Plate, playing at the age of 16. Pablo Aimar also was a key player and vital playmaker.

That same year, Argentine sports magazine El Gráfico #4172 named River Plate as "Champions of the Century" ("Campeón Del Siglo"), noting the club's achievements, especially its then 30 Primera División titles against Boca Juniors' 24 and Independiente's 15.

== Ups and downs (2000s) ==
On 25 May 2001 River Plate celebrated its 100 years of existence with a march, called "Monumental Caravan" and a friendly match against Peñarol of Uruguay. This was a year without a title for River, being eliminated in the quarter-finals of the Libertadores against Cruz Azul of Mexico. That year were transferred Pablo Aimar and Javier Saviola to Valencia and Barcelona respectively.

In 2002, Ramón Díaz returned to the club to replace Gallego as coach. River also brought back Ariel Ortega and promoted to Primera youthful players such as Andrés D'Alessandro and Fernando Cavenaghi, winning the Clausura tournament and earning his seventh title with Ramón Díaz as coach, which included a 3:0 victory against Boca at the Bombonera. Ramón Díaz left River at the end of that year due to differences between him and the President José María Aguilar.

In 2003 River won the Clausura tournament, led by Chilean coach Manuel Pellegrini and a team of players like Leonardo Astrada (who retired at the end of the tournament), D'Alessandro, Fernando Cavenaghi, Javier Mascherano and Martín Demichelis.

In 2004, with Leonardo Astrada as manager, River achieved the Clausura tournament, this was its thirty-second domestic championship. The team also returned to the semi-finals of Copa Libertadores facing Boca Juniors. Boca won 1–0 the first game, where there were incidents between players from both clubs, and River won 2–1 in the Monumental although the team left out in the penalty shootout. After the Copa América and Olympic Games (where Argentina national team won its first gold medal with Mascherano and Lucho González as part of the team), River sold most of its figures, so Cavenaghi, Lucho González, Javier Mascherano, Marcelo Salas and Maximiliano López left the club that same year.

In 2008, Diego Simeone was appointed manager of the club, in his first season he led them to their first league title in four years, winning the Clausura championship. The following season the club suffered a poor run of form resulting in Simeone's resignation mid-season. The club went on to finish in last place in the Apertura 2008, the first time River had ever finished bottom of a league in 107 years.

== Relegation and promotion (2011–2012) ==
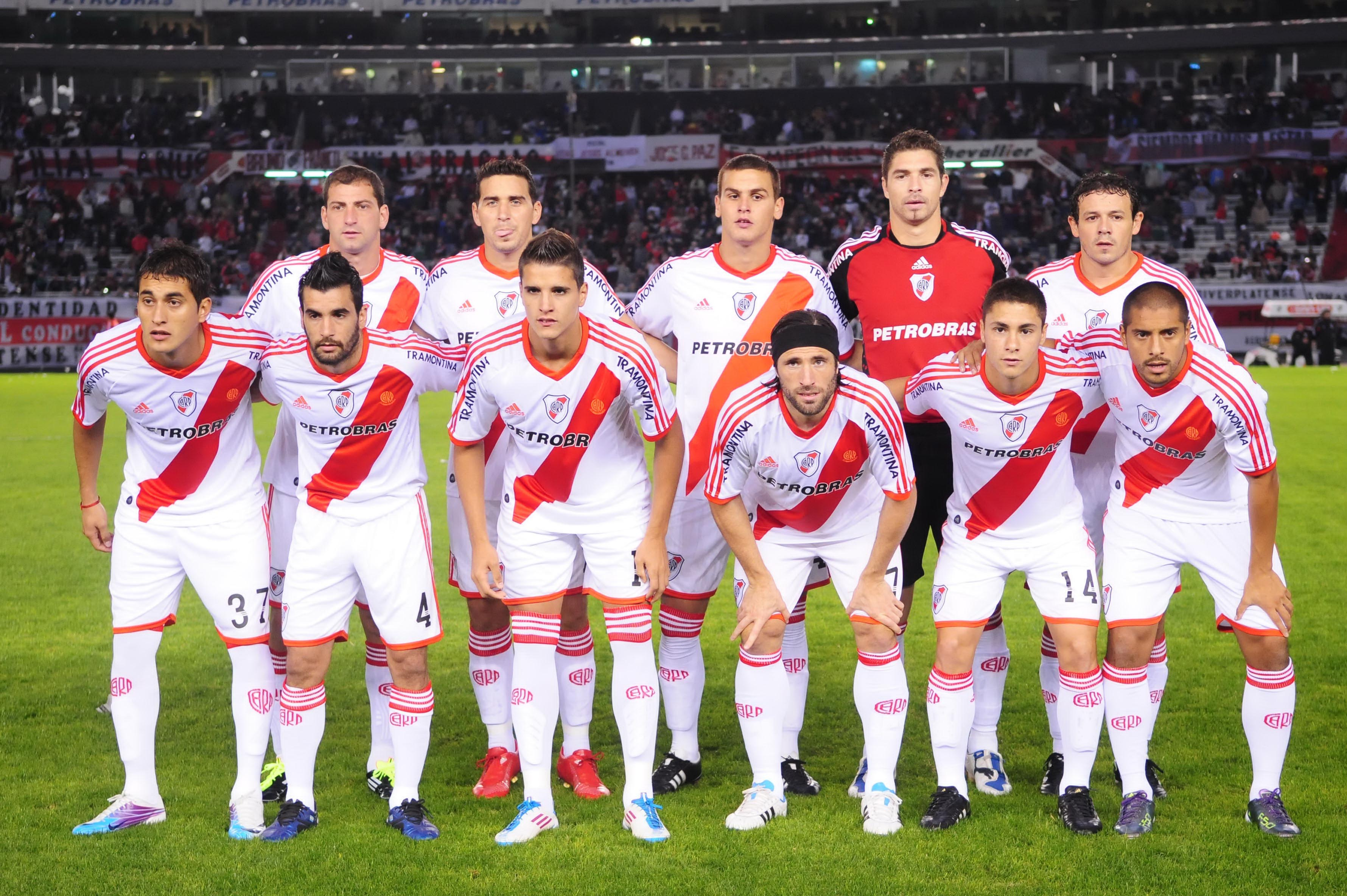
River in 2011, the year that the club was relegated to Primera B Nacional.

In 2011, River Plate was facing both an institutional and sports crisis. José María Aguilar left the presidency of the club with a debt of over 75 million dollars, being replaced by Daniel Passarella. The team ended the 2008 Apertura tournament at the bottom of the table, and River's poor form followed through the 2011 Clausura tournament. As a result, River played the Promoción, a two-legged play-off against Belgrano de Córdoba, the fourth placed team of the 2010–11 Primera B Nacional. Belgrano won the first leg 2–0 at Córdoba, and held on for a 1–1 draw at El Monumental. With the defeat, River Plate was relegated to Nacional B for the first time in its history. The second match was interrupted during injury time by rioting in the stadium and its surroundings which continued after the match was called, despite a substantial police presence. Almost immediately following River's relegation, Juan José López resigned as manager.

=== Back to Primera División ===
Matías Almeyda retired as player when River was relegated to become the team's coach, while Fernando Cavenaghi and Alejandro Domínguez returned to the club to play at the second division. In January 2012, David Trezeguet and Leonardo Ponzio arrived to the club to play the second half of Nacional. In June 2012, River won the title after defeating Almirante Brown by 2–0 in the last fixture and therefore returned to Primera División to play the 2012–13 season. Just a week later, the reserve team of River coached by Cesar Laraignee won the U-20 Copa Libertadores in Lima, Peru, after defeating Defensor Sporting of Uruguay 1–0 in the final.

After some conflicts with the President, manager Almeyda was eventually fired by the club on 28 November 2012, only two rounds before the end of the Torneo Inicial. The following day it was announced that Ramón Díaz would become River's coach for third time in history.

== Success after the dark years (2012–present) ==
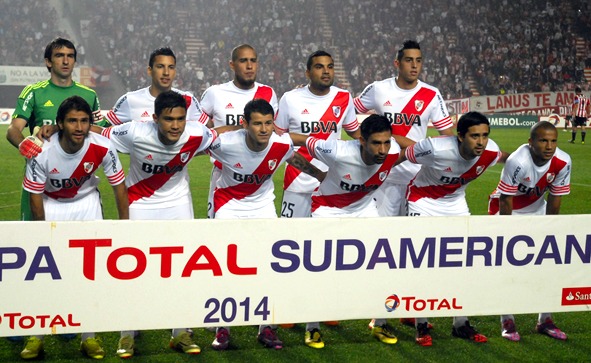
River Plate's first squad won the 2014 Copa Sudamericana after 17 years without Conmebol titles.

On 18 May 2014, River won their 36th national league title when the team clinched the 2014 Torneo Final, beating Quilmes by 5–0. A week later River won the 2013–14 Superfinal against 2013 Torneo Inicial champion, San Lorenzo de Almagro. Ramón Díaz immediately resigned and left River amid the celebrations for both championships. Several days later it was confirmed that Marcelo Gallardo would be the new coach for River. His team was highly praised during the beginnings of the semester due to the good level of its game style, but competing in three different tournaments took its toll.

However, the first team won its first CONMEBOL tournament in 17 years on December 10, the 2014 Copa Sudamericana. River Plate beat Colombian team Atlético Nacional at the finals, winning 3–1 on aggregate (1–1 on the first leg away and 2–0 on the second leg at home). Previously, River Plate had beaten Godoy Cruz, Club Libertad, Estudiantes (LP) and arch-rival Boca Juniors.

As 2014 Copa Sudamericana champions, River contested the 2015 Recopa Sudamericana against 2014 Copa Libertadores champions San Lorenzo. They won both legs 1–0 to win their first Recopa Sudamericana. River went on an unbeaten streak in the 2015 Argentine Primera División first 10 matches that ended in a 2–0 loss to Boca Juniors at La Bombonera. Also, they competed in the 2014–15 Copa Argentina and they were knocked out 0–2 by Rosario Central in the round of 32. Meanwhile, River started their 2015 Copa Libertadores campaign in a poor way, with a 2–0 away defeat to Bolivian side San José. Next, they played UANL from Mexico at El Monumental to a 1–1 draw. Consequently, they met Peruvian club Juan Aurich and drew 1–1 both away and at home, thus putting their qualification hopes in danger. After trailing 2–0 to UANL in Mexico, River produced a remarkable comeback in the last 5 minutes to earn a 2–2 draw and stay alive in the competition. In their last group stage match, they defeated San José 3–0 at home, while simultaneously UANL visited and beat Juan Aurich 5–4, thus River advanced to the knockout stage (Juan Aurich had a 2-point advantage over River before the last matchday).

As the worst second-placed team in the group stage, River were drawn with Boca Juniors, the best group-winners, in the round of 16. River beat Boca 1–0 in the first leg at El Monumental. In the second leg at La Bombonera, River players were attacked with pepper spray while returning to the field at halftime. The match was suspended with a 0–0 score, and Boca were disqualified from the tournament. River met Brazilian side Cruzeiro in the quarterfinals, losing 0–1 in at home, but ultimately advancing to the semifinals for the first time in 9 years after a 3–0 away victory. They played Guaraní from Paraguay, winning 2–0 at home and drawing 1–1 away, hence qualifying for their first Copa Libertadores finals since 1996. River Plate won the final and the 2015 Copa Libertadores after defeating Tigres UANL by 3–0. Meanwhile, River's domestical form dropped, with 3 draws and 6 losses on their last 12 matches, and eventually finished in ninth place.

On November 11, 2018, River drew 2–2 with Boca Juniors in the first leg of the 2018 Copa Libertadores final, before winning the second leg 3–1 at the Santiago Bernabéu, home of Real Madrid, to win the competition for the fourth time.
