= 1997–98 Valencia CF season =

Valencia
1997–98 season
- President: Francisco Roig (until 30 November 1997); Pedro Cortes
- Manager: Jorge Valdano (until 14 September 1997); Claudio Ranieri
- Stadium: Mestalla
- La Liga: 9th (in UEFA Intertoto Cup)
- Copa del Rey: Round of 16
- Top goalscorer: League: Claudio Löpez; Adrian Ilie (12 each); All: Adrian Ilie (13 goals)
Home colours	Away colours

During the 1997–98 Spanish football season, Valencia competed in La Liga and Copa del Rey.

== Summary ==
During the summer, the club transferred out 13 players and bought several players, such as right back Defender Jocelyn Angloma from Internazionale, centre-back Defender Miroslav Đukić from Deportivo La Coruña, left back Defender Amedeo Carboni, midfielder Marcelinho Carioca (lasting just six months) and Romário returned from Flamengo, only to be injured in pre-season and left the team in December. The squad started poorly with three consecutive losses; Jorge Valdano was sacked and was replaced by Claudio Ranieri as the club's new manager in October. Meanwhile, the bad streak of results prompted President Paco Roig to quit the job after three years in charge, and later the shareholders appointed Pedro Cortes (former President in 1986) as its new chairman. After a chaotic first half of the campaign, the squad improved its performance in the second part of the campaign, thanks to the boost Ranieri's team received from the upcoming midfield youngsters Gaizka Mendieta, Miguel Angulo, Francisco Javier Farinos, as well as forward Adrian Ilie, who arrived to the club in late December and scored 12 goals.

The team finished in a disappointing ninth place in league, qualifying for the next season's UEFA Intertoto Cup. Also, in the Copa del Rey, the squad was defeated in two legs by Barcelona, being eliminated in the eighth-finals.

== Squad ==
Squad at end of season

Note: Flags indicate national team as defined under FIFA eligibility rules; some limited exceptions apply. Players may hold more than one non-FIFA nationality.

No.	Pos.	Nation	Player
1	GK	ESP	Andoni Zubizarreta
2	DF	ESP	Javi Navarro
3	DF	ESP	Juanfran
4	DF	ESP	Francisco José Camarasa
5	DF	YUG	Miroslav Đukić
6	MF	ESP	Gaizka Mendieta
7	FW	ARG	Claudio López
8	MF	ESP	Francisco Javier Farinos
9	FW	ARG	Ariel Ortega
10	MF	ESP	Fernando
11	FW	BRA	Romário
12	MF	ARG	Guillermo Morigi
13	GK	ARG	Gustavo Campagnuolo
14	MF	ESP	Gerard López

No.	Pos.	Nation	Player
15	DF	ITA	Amedeo Carboni
16	MF	PER	José del Solar
17	MF	BRA	Marcelinho Carioca
18	DF	ALG	Moussa Saib
19	FW	CRO	Goran Vlaović
20	DF	FRA	Jocelyn Angloma
21	MF	ESP	Luis Milla
22	MF	ESP	David Albelda
23	MF	ESP	Miguel Angulo
24	DF	ARG	Fernando Cáceres
25	GK	ESP	Jorge Bartual
28	MF	ESP	Miguel Ángel Soria
11	FW	ROU	Adrian Ilie
17	FW	URU	Nicolás Olivera

=== Transfers ===
In
Pos.	Name	from	Type
FW	Romário	Flamengo	
FW	Marcelinho Carioca	Corinthians	€5.20 million
DF	Moussa Saib	Auxerre	€4.30 million
DF	Amedeo Carboni	Roma	€4.00 million
GK	Gustavo Campagnuolo	Deportivo Español	
MF	José del Solar	Celta Vigo	
DF	Jocelyn Angloma	Internazionale	
DF	Miroslav Đukić	Deportivo La Coruña	
MF	Luis Milla	Real Madrid	
FW	Miguel Angulo	Villarreal	
DF	Juanfran	Levante	
MF	Guillermo Morigi	Velez Sarsfield	
MF	Gerard López	Barcelona B	
MF	David Albelda	Villarreal	
FW	Nicolás Olivera	Defensor Sporting	

Out
Pos.	Name	To	Type
DF	Enrique Romero	Mallorca	
DF	Iván Campo	Mallorca	€1.0 million
FW	Gabriel Moya	Mallorca	
MF	Vicente Engonga	Mallorca	
FW	Jose Galvez	Mallorca	
MF	Xabier Eskurza	Mallorca	
MF	Leandro Machado	Sporting CP	€1.0 million
DF	Jorge Otero	Real Betis	
MF	Valeri Karpin	Celta Vigo	
DF	Patxi Ferreira	Athletic Bilbao	
MF	José Ignacio	Real Zaragoza	
GK	Andrés Palop	Villarreal	
MF	Antonio Poyatos	Sporting Gijón	
DF	Sietes	Racing Santander	

==== Winter ====
In
Pos.	Name	from	Type
FW	Adrian Ilie	Galatasaray	€3.76 million

Out
Pos.	Name	To	Type
FW	Romário	Flamengo	
FW	Marcelinho Carioca	Corinthians	€5.20 million

Source: BDFutbol.com

== Competitions ==
=== La Liga ===
==== League table ====
Pos	Team	Pld	W	D	L	GF	GA	GD	Pts	Qualification or relegation
7	Atlético Madrid	38	16	12	10	79	56	+23	60 (Note: MLL: 9 pts; CEL: 5 pts; ATM: 2 pts)	Qualification for the UEFA Cup first round
8	Real Betis	38	17	8	13	49	50	−1	59	Qualification for the UEFA Cup first round
9	Valencia	38	16	7	15	58	52	+6	55	Qualification for the Intertoto Cup third round
10	Espanyol	38	12	17	9	44	31	+13	53	Qualification for the Intertoto Cup second round
11	Valladolid	38	13	11	14	36	47	−11	50	

Source: LFP
Rules for classification: 1) points; 2) head-to-head points; 3) head-to-head goal difference; 4) head-to-head goals scored; 5) goal difference; 6) number of goals scored.

==== Position by round ====
Round	1	2	3	4	5	6	7	8	9	10	11	12	13	14	15	16	17	18	19	20	21	22	23	24	25	26	27	28	29	30	31	32	33	34	35	36	37	38
Ground	A	H	A	H	A	H	A	H	A	H	A	H	A	H	A	H	H	A	H	H	A	H	A	H	A	H	A	H	A	H	A	H	A	H	A	A	H	A
Result	L	L	L	L	W	D	L	D	L	W	L	W	L	L	D	W	W	W	L	D	W	W	W	L	W	W	D	W	W	D	L	W	L	W	L	W	D	L
Position	14	18	18	18	17	16	17	16	17	17	18	17	17	18	19	16	13	13	13	15	13	11	10	11	11	9	10	9	8	9	9	8	9	9	9	8	9	9

Source: Competitive matches
A = Away; H = Home; W = Win; D = Draw; L = Loss; = Leader, 1998–99 UEFA Champions League Group stage; = 1998–99 UEFA Champions League Qualifying round; = 1998–99 UEFA Cup First round; = 1998 UEFA Intertoto Cup; = 1998–99 Segunda División

==== Matches ====
31 August 1997 1	Mallorca	2-1	Valencia	Palma de Mallorca
18:15	Amato 5'; Olaizola (yellow card) 66'; Eskurza (yellow card) 68'; Djukic 88' (o.g.); Eskurza (yellow card) 88' (yellow-red card); Moya (yellow card) 90'	Report	(yellow card) 16' Djukic; (yellow card) 33' Saïb; 55'Djukic; (yellow card) 57' Juanfran; (yellow card) 91' (yellow-red card) Djukic	Stadium: Lluis Sitjar; Referee: Megia Davila

8 September 1997 2	Valencia	0-3	Barcelona	Valencia
	Carboni (yellow card) 44' (yellow-red card)		1' Anderson; 38' (pen.) Rivaldo; 78' De La Peña	Stadium: Mestalla; Referee: Puentes Leira

14 September 1997 3	Racing Santander	2-1	Valencia	Santander
	Javi Lopez 25'; Correa 32'; Porfirio (yellow card) 49' (yellow-red card)	Report	19' Vlaovic	Referee: Losantos Omar

27 September 1997 4	Valencia	0-2	Real Madrid	Valencia
20:30	Javi Navarro (yellow card) 64' (yellow-red card)	Report	72' Raul; 79' Mijatovic	Stadium: Mestalla; Referee: Perez Lasa

5 October 1997 5	Real Valladolid	0-3	Valencia	Valladolid
17:00		Report	7' Vlaovic; 45' Vlaovic; 57' (o.g.) Julio Cesar	Stadium: Jose Zorrilla; Referee: Brito Arceo

15 October 1997 6	Valencia	1-1	Athletic Bilbao	Valencia
21:30	Claudio Lopez 10'	Report	74' (pen.) Javi Gonzalez	Stadium: Mestalla; Referee: Rodriguez Martel

19 October 1997 7	Celta Vigo	1-0	Valencia	Vigo
17:00	Mostovoi 10' (pen.)		(yellow card) 13' (yellow-red card) Carboni	Stadium: Balaidos; Referee: Dauden Ibañez

26 October 1997 8	Valencia	1-1	Real Oviedo	Valencia
17:00	Romario 8'		85' Dely Valdes	Stadium: Mestalla; Referee: Lopez de la Fuente

3 November 1997 9	Mérida	1-0	Valencia	Mérida
21:30	Marcos 5' (pen.)	Report		Stadium: Romano Jose Fouto; Referee: Garcia Aranda

9 November 1997 10	Valencia	2-1	Real Zaragoza	Valencia
17:00	Angloma 26'; Claudio Lopez 63'	Report	88' Kily Gonzalez	Stadium: Mestalla; Referee: Carmona Mendez

12 November 1997 11	Espanyol	3-0	Valencia	Barcelona
20:45	Arteaga 14'; Pocchettino 20'; Galca 65'	Report		Stadium: Montjuic; Referee: Puentes Leira

16 November 1997 12	Valencia	1-0	Real Betis	Valencia
19:30	Djukic 1'	Report		Stadium: Mestalla; Referee: Diaz Vega

22 November 1997 13	Atlético Madrid	3-1	Valencia	Madrid
20:30	Bogdanovic 24'; Juninho 60' (pen.); Pantic 85'	Report	50' Vlaovic	Stadium: Vicente Calderón; Referee: Japon Sevilla

30 November 1997 14	Valencia	0-1	Salamanca	Valencia
17:00		Report	59' Pauleta	Stadium: Mestalla; Referee: Javega Jimenez

7 December 1997 15	Real Sociedad	1-1	Valencia	San Sebastián
17:30	Antia 58'	Report	79'Mendieta	Stadium: Anoeta; Referee: Andradas Asurmendi

14 December 1997 16	Valencia	4-1	Compostela	Valencia
17:00	Claudio Lopez 11'; Vlaovic 62'; Angulo 64'; Ortega 86'	Report	87' Bellido	Stadium: Mestalla; Referee: Dauden Ibañez

18 December 1997 17	Valencia	1-0	Deportivo La Coruña	Valencia
21:30	Vlaovic 53'	Report		Stadium: Mestalla; Referee: Mejuto Gonzalez

21 December 1997 18	Sporting Gijón	0-3	Valencia	Gijón
17:00			9' Farinos; 42' Claudio Lopez; 66' Claudio Lopez	Stadium: El Molinon; Referee: Lopez Nieto

4 January 1998 19	Valencia	1-2	Tenerife	Valencia
19:00	Angloma 42'	Report	50' (pen.) Kodro; 79' Domingos	Stadium: Mestalla; Referee: Esquinas Torres

12 January 1998 20	Valencia	0-0	Mallorca	Valencia
		Report		Stadium: Mestalla

19 January 1998 21	Barcelona	3-4	Valencia	Barcelona
	Luis Enrique 32'; Rivaldo 49' (yellow card); Fernando Cáceres 54' (own goal); Ferrer (yellow card)	Report	69' Morigi; 75' Claudio Lopez; 87' Claudio Lopez; 88' (yellow card) 89' (yellow-red card) Ortega; (yellow card) Carboni; (yellow card) Djukic	Stadium: Camp Nou; Referee: Perez Burrull

25 January 1998 22	Valencia	6-1	Racing Santander	Valencia
17:00	Ilie 3'; Ilie 29'; Angloma 51'; Ilie 71'; Claudio Lopez 75'; Claudio Lopez 77'	Report	(yellow card) 84' (yellow-red card) Schürrer; 86' Abeijon	Stadium: Mestalla; Referee: Iturralde Gonzalez

2 February 1998 23	Real Madrid	1-2	Valencia	Madrid
21:30	Mijatovic (penalty missed) 12'; Suker 67' (pen.)	Report	3' (pen.) Mendieta; 17' Ilie	Stadium: Santiago Bernabéu; Referee: Lopez de La Fuente

8 February 1998 24	Valencia	1-2	Real Valladolid	Valencia
	Djukic 45'; Juanfran (yellow card) 58' (yellow-red card); Ortega (yellow card) 92' (yellow-red card)	Report	14' Benjamin; 42' Victor	Stadium: Mestalla; Referee: Esquinas Torres

15 February 1998 25	Athletic Bilbao	0-3	Valencia	Bilbao
19:30	Roberto Rios (yellow card) 77' (yellow-red card)	Report	38' Ilie; 58' Ilie; 75' Mendieta	Stadium: San Mamés; Referee: Carmona Mendez

22 February 1998 26	Valencia	2-1	Celta Vigo	Valencia
17:00	Farinos 43'; Mendieta 53'	Report	65' Cadete	Stadium: Mestalla; Referee: Andradas Asurmendi

1 March 1998 27	Real Oviedo	0-0	Valencia	Oviedo
		Report		Stadium: Carlos Tartiere

9 March 1998 28	Valencia	3-0	Mérida	Valencia
21:30	Vlaovic 6'; Ilie 46'; Mendieta 68'	Report		Stadium: Mestalla; Referee: Dauden Ibañez

15 March 1998 29	Real Zaragoza	0-2	Valencia	Zaragoza
17:00		Report	72' Ilie; 90' Claudio Lopez	Stadium: La Romareda; Referee: Diaz Vega

22 March 1998 30	Valencia	0-0	Espanyol	Valencia
		Report		Stadium: Mestalla; Referee: Brito Arceo

28 March 1998 31	Real Betis	1-0	Valencia	Sevilla
20:30	Oli 79'	Report		Stadium: Benito Villamarin; Referee: LosantosOmar

5 April 1998 32	Valencia	4-1	Atlético Madrid	Valencia
19:30	Ilie 47'; Mendieta 68' (pen.); Mendieta 70' (pen.); Claudio Lopez 79'	Report	74' Kiko	Stadium: Mestalla; Referee: Perez Lasa

12 April 1998 33	Salamanca	6-0	Valencia	Villares de la Reina
17:00	Rogerio 5'; Lanna 25'; Pauleta 42'; Pauleta 76' (pen.); Silvani 79'; Sito 89'	Report	(penalty missed) 58' Mendieta; (yellow card) 63' (yellow-red card) Carboni	Stadium: Helmantico Stadium; Referee: Puentes Leira

18 April 1998 34	Valencia	3-2	Real Sociedad	Valencia
20:30	Angulo 22'; Angulo 68'; Ilie 77'; Juanfran (yellow card) 90' (yellow-red card)	Report	31' Loren; (yellow card) 80' (yellow-red card) Gomez; 83' (pen.) Craioveanu	Stadium: Mestalla; Referee: Mejuto Gonzalez

26 April 1998 35	Compostela	3-1	Valencia	Santiago de Compostela
17:00	Chiba 4'; Bellido 32'; Penev 45'	Report	40' (pen.) Mendieta	Referee: Esquinas Torres

2 May 1998 36	Deportivo La Coruña	1-2	Valencia	La Coruña
21:00	Scaloni 81'	Report	65' (pen.) Mendieta; 91' Mendieta	Stadium: Riazor; Referee: Garcia Aranda

9 May 1998 37	Valencia	2-2	Sporting Gijón	Gijón
21:00	Ilie 26'; Claudio Lopez 69'; Claudio Lopez (yellow card) 87' (yellow-red card)	Report	40' Miguel; 41' Cano	Referee: Gracia Redondo

15 May 1998 38	Tenerife	3-2	Valencia	Santa Cruz de Tenerife
22:00	Felipe 28'; Domingos 80'; Jokanovic 82' (pen.); Dani (yellow card) 85' (yellow-red card)	Report	17' Ilie; 79' Fernando Gomez; (yellow card) 87' (yellow-red card) Djukic	Stadium: Heliodoro Rodriguez Lopez; Referee: Dauden Ibañez

Source: Competitive Matches

=== Copa del Rey ===
==== Eight-finals ====
15 January 1998	Barcelona	2-1	Valencia	Barcelona
20:30	Luis Enrique 4'; Rivaldo 66'		Gómez 37' (pen.)	Stadium: Camp Nou; Attendance: 55,000; Referee: Manuel Mejuto González

22 January 1998	Valencia	1-3	Barcelona	Valencia
20:30	Angloma 68'		Rivaldo 26' (pen.) 79'; Giovanni 90'	Stadium: Mestalla; Attendance: 48,000; Referee: Antonio López Nieto

== Statistics ==
=== Players statistics ===
No.	Pos	Nat	Player	Total		La Liga		Copa del Rey	
No.	Pos	Nat	Player	Apps	Goals	Apps	Goals	Apps	Goals
1	GK	(Spain) ESP	Andoni Zubizarreta	40	-47	34	-40	6	-7
20	DF	(France) FRA	Jocelyn Angloma	37	4	32	3	5	1
5	DF	(Federal Republic of Yugoslavia) YUG	Miroslav Đukić	36	3	33	3	3	0
28	DF	(Spain) ESP	Miguel Ángel Soria	26	0	23	0	3	0
24	DF	(Argentina) ARG	Fernando Cáceres	35	0	29	0	6	0
15	DF	(Italy) ITA	Amedeo Carboni	35	1	29	0	6	1
6	MF	(Spain) ESP	Gaizka Mendieta	35	10	30	10	5	0
21	MF	(Spain) ESP	Luis Milla	35	0	28+2	0	4+1	0
8	MF	(Spain) ESP	Javier Farinós	37	2	26+5	2	4+2	0
19	FW	(Croatia) CRO	Goran Vlaović	27	7	21+5	7	0+1	0
7	FW	(Argentina) ARG	Claudio Lopez	37	12	26+6	12	3+2	0
13	GK	(Argentina) ARG	Gustavo Campagnuolo	2	-8	2	-8	0	0
23	MF	(Spain) ESP	Miguel Angulo	31	6	14+14	3	3	3
11	FW	(Romania) ROU	Adrian Ilie	20	13	15+2	12	2+1	1
3	DF	(Spain) ESP	Juanfran	24	0	11+9	0	1+3	0
18	DF	(Algeria) ALG	Moussa Saib	16	0	11+3	0	2	0
9	FW	(Argentina) ARG	Ariel Ortega	23	2	10+10	2	3	0
10	MF	(Spain) ESP	Fernando Gomez	25	3	9+12	1	4	2
16	MF	(Peru) PER	José del Solar	13	0	9+3	0	0+1	0
14	MF	(Spain) ESP	Gerard López	14	0	6+5	0	2+1	0
11	FW	(Brazil) BRA	Romário	7	2	6	1	1	1
12	MF	(Argentina) ARG	Guillermo Morigi	20	1	4+11	1	0+5	0
2	DF	(Spain) ESP	Javi Navarro	8	0	4+2	0	2	0
25	GK	(Spain) ESP	Jorge Bartual	2	-4	2	-4	0	0
17	MF	(Brazil) BRA	Marcelinho Carioca	6	0	2+3	0	1	0
4	DF	(Spain) ESP	Paco Camarasa	3	0	2+1	0		
22	MF	(Spain) ESP	David Albelda	5	0	0+5	0		
17	FW	(Uruguay) URU	Nicolás Olivera	3	0	0+2	0	0+1	0

- Source: https://www.bdfutbol.com/en/t/t1997-9836.html

== See also ==
- Valencia CF
- 1997–98 La Liga
- 1997–98 Copa del Rey
