= 1996–97 Valencia CF season =

Valencia CF
1996–97 season
- President: Francisco Roig
- Manager: Luis Aragonés (until 19 November 1996); José Manuel Rielo (until 24 November 1996); Jorge Valdano
- Stadium: Mestalla
- La Liga: 10th
- Copa del Rey: Round of 16
- UEFA Cup: Quarter-finals
- Top goalscorer: League: Leandro; Goran Vlaović (8 each); All: Goran Vlaović (10 goals)
Home colours	Away colours

During the 1996–97 season Valencia CF competed in La Liga, Copa del Rey and UEFA Cup.

== Summary ==
During summer the club transferred in several players such as 1994 FIFA World Cup Winner Romário on loan from FC Barcelona, Forward Claudio López, centre back Defender Fernando Cáceres, Brazilian midfielder Leandro Machado and Croatian Striker Goran Vlaović from Padova Calcio in an attempt to replace the sale of Predrag Mijatović to Real Madrid. The purchase of Romário was controversial after several disputes between the Brazilian star and Luis Aragonés upon October when the forward finished his agreement and left the club to return to Flamengo. On 19 November 1996 after a bad streak of results and controversies with President, Luis Aragonés renounces as coach. Then, the club appointed Jorge Valdano as its new manager for the rest of the season.

In League, the team collapsed to the 10th spot getting out of the Continental competitions next year. Also, in Copa del Rey the squad was eliminated in Eightfinals by underdogs Segunda División team UD Las Palmas after two legs and a penalties series. Finally, the club was defeated by Schalke 04 in UEFA Cup Quarterfinals stage with a 1–3 score.

== Squad ==
Squad at end of season

Note: Flags indicate national team as defined under FIFA eligibility rules; some limited exceptions apply. Players may hold more than one non-FIFA nationality.

No.	Pos.	Nation	Player
1	GK	ESP	Andoni Zubizarreta
2	DF	ESP	Javi Navarro
3	DF	ESP	Jorge Otero
4	DF	ESP	Francisco José Camarasa
5	MF	ESP	Antonio Poyatos
6	MF	ESP	Gaizka Mendieta
7	FW	ESP	Sietes
8	FW	ESP	Gabriel Moya
9	MF	BRA	Leandro Machado
10	MF	ESP	Fernando Gomez
11	FW	BRA	Romário
12	DF	ESP	Iván Campo
13	GK	ESP	Jorge Bartual
14	MF	ESP	Jose Ignacio Saenz

No.	Pos.	Nation	Player
15	MF	ESP	Patxi Ferreira
16	FW	ARG	Claudio López
17	FW	ESP	Iñaki Hurtado
18	MF	RUS	Valeri Karpin
19	FW	CRO	Goran Vlaović
20	MF	ESP	Xabier Eskurza
21	DF	ESP	Enrique Romero
22	FW	ESP	Pepe Gálvez
23	DF	ESP	Vicente Engonga
24	DF	ARG	Fernando Cáceres
25	FW	ARG	Ariel Ortega
27	FW	ESP	Rubén Navarro
31	MF	ESP	Javier Farinós

=== Transfers ===
In
Pos.	Name	from	Type
FW	Romário	FC Barcelona	loan
FW	Claudio López	Racing Club	
MF	Valeri Karpin	Real Sociedad	
FW	Gabriel Moya	Sevilla CF	
FW	Goran Vlaović	Padova Calcio	
DF	Iván Campo	Real Valladolid	loan ended

Out
Pos.	Name	To	Type
FW	Predrag Mijatović	Real Madrid	
MF	Mazinho	Celta Vigo	€0.811 million
FW	Viola	Palmeiras	
MF	Carlos Arroyo	Villarreal CF	
FW	Serer	Villarreal CF	
FW	José Gálvez Estévez	RCD Mallorca	loan

==== Winter ====
In
Pos.	Name	from	Type
DF	Fernando Cáceres	Real Zaragoza	
MF	Leandro	SC Internacional	
MF	Ariel Ortega	River Plate	

Out
Pos.	Name	To	Type
FW	Romário	CR Flamengo	loan

Source: BDFutbol.com

== Competitions ==
=== La Liga ===
==== League table ====
Pos	Team	Pld	W	D	L	GF	GA	GD	Pts
8	Real Sociedad	42	18	9	15	50	47	+3	63
9	Tenerife	42	15	11	16	69	57	+12	56 (Note: VAL 2–1 TEN; TEN 2–1 VAL)
10	Valencia	42	15	11	16	63	59	+4	56
11	Compostela	42	13	14	15	52	65	−13	53
12	Espanyol	42	14	9	19	51	57	−6	51

Source: LFP
Rules for classification: 1) points; 2) head-to-head points; 3) head-to-head goal difference; 4) head-to-head goals scored; 5) goal difference; 6) number of goals scored.

==== Position by round ====
Round	1	2	3	4	5	6	7	8	9	10	11	12	13	14	15	16	17	18	19	20	21	22	23	24	25	26	27	28	29	30	31	32	33	34	35	36	37	38	39	40	41	42
Ground	A	H	A	H	A	H	A	H	A	H	H	A	H	A	H	A	H	A	H	A	H	H	A	H	A	H	A	H	A	H	A	A	H	A	H	A	H	A	H	A	H	A
Result	L	L	D	W	W	L	W	W	W	L	L	L	D	L	W	L	W	D	W	L	D	D	W	D	L	W	L	W	W	L	D	L	W	L	D	D	D	W	D	L	W	L
Position	14	20	21	15	10	15	12	7	6	7	9	12	11	13	11	13	11	12	10	11	11	11	11	11	11	11	11	10	9	10	10	10	10	10	10	10	10	9	9	9	9	10

Source: Competitive matches
A = Away; H = Home; W = Win; D = Draw; L = Loss; = Leader, 1997–98 UEFA Champions League Group stage; = 1997–98 UEFA Cup First round; = 1996–97 La Liga#Relegation playoff; = 1997–98 Segunda División; R = 1997–98 UEFA Cup Winners' Cup

==== Matches ====
1 September 1996 1	Racing Santander	3-2	Valencia	Santander
	P. Ferreira (og) 45' (o.g.); Alvaro 48'; Zalazar 80'		33' Vlaovic; 41' Romario	Stadium: El Sardinero; Attendance: 16,000

7 September 1996 2	Valencia	0-1	Real Sociedad	Valencia
			Kovacevic 19'	Stadium: Mestalla; Attendance: 42,000

14 September 1996 3	Real Zaragoza	1-1	Valencia	Zaragoza
	Aguado 9'		Moya 44'	Stadium: La Romareda; Attendance: 18,000

21 September 1996 4	Valencia	2-1	CD Tenerife	Valencia
	Romero 68'; Romario 71'		Kodro 73'	Stadium: Mestalla; Attendance: 45,000

29 September 1996 5	SD Compostela	0-3	Valencia	Santiago de Compostela
			Moya 46'; Romario 84', 90'	Stadium: San Lázaro; Attendance: 9,000

2 October 1996 6	Valencia	0-1	CD Logroñés	Valencia
			Morales 26'	Stadium: Mestalla; Attendance: 45,000

12 October 1996 7	Sevilla CF	0-2	Valencia	Seville
			Fernando 16'; Moya 73'	Stadium: Sanchez Pizjuan; Attendance: 41,400

20 October 1996 8	Valencia	3-1	Atlético Madrid	Valencia
	Poyatos 37'; Vlaovic 50'; Claudio Lopez 90'		88' Esnaider	Stadium: Mestalla; Attendance: 45,000

23 October 1996 9	Valencia	2-1	Sporting Gijón	Valencia
	Moya 14'; Karpin 65'		36' Bango	Stadium: Mestalla; Attendance: 45,000

26 October 1996 10	FC Barcelona	3-2	Valencia	Barcelona
	Ronaldo 15', 35', 74'		Ferreira 53'; Karpin 58'	Stadium: Camp Nou; Attendance: 90,000

10 November 1996 11	Valencia	2-4	Real Valladolid	Valencia
	Romero 20'; Galvez 71'		6' Victor; 43', 69'Fernando; 48'Quevedo	Stadium: Mestalla; Attendance: 45,000

16 November 1996 12	Athletic Bilbao	2-0	Valencia	Bilbao
	Ziganda 16'; Etxeberria 77'			Stadium: San Mamés; Attendance: 40,000

19 November 1996 13	Valencia	0-0	Extremadura CF	Valencia
				Stadium: Mestalla; Attendance: 30,000

24 November 1996 14	Real Madrid	4-2	Valencia	Madrid
	Suker 15', 21', 60'; Raul 75'		Karpin 10'; Mendieta 90' (pen.)	Stadium: Santiago Bernabéu

30 November 1996 15	Valencia	2-0	Celta Vigo	Valencia
	Karpin 22'; Iñaki 90'			Stadium: Mestalla; Attendance: 40,000

8 December 1996 16	Deportivo La Coruña	1-0	Valencia	La Coruña
	Martins 6'			Stadium: Riazor; Attendance: 22,000

23 December 1996 17	Valencia	3-0	Hércules CF	Valencia
	Vlaovic; Patxi Ferreira; Claudio Lopez			Stadium: Mestalla; Attendance: 45,000

6 January 1997 18	Real Betis	1-1	Valencia	Seville
	Alexis 72' (pen.)		80' Moya	Stadium: Benito Villamarín; Attendance: 35,000

12 January 1997 19	Valencia	1-0	Rayo Vallecano	Valencia
	Galvez 90'			Stadium: Mestalla

19 January 1997 20	Real Oviedo	3-0	Valencia	Oviedo
	Maqueda 19', 67'; Rivas 59'			Stadium: Carlos Tartiere; Attendance: 11,660

25 January 1997 21	Valencia	1-1	RCD Espanyol	Valencia
	Moya 70'		84' Luis	Stadium: Mestalla; Attendance: 45,000

2 February 1997 22	Valencia	1-1	Racing Santander	Valencia
	83' (pen.) Engonga		Schurrer 85'	Stadium: Mestalla; Attendance: 45,000

8 February 1997 23	Real Sociedad	0-1	Valencia	San Sebastián
			6' Karpin	Stadium: Anoeta; Attendance: 20,000

15 February 1997 24	Valencia	1-1	Real Zaragoza	Valencia
	13' Claudio Lopez		Kily Gonzalez 81'	Stadium: Mestalla; Attendance: 45,000

19 February 1997 25	CD Tenerife	2-1	Valencia	Santa Cruz de Tenerife
	Felipe 62'; Neuville 75'		72' Patxi Ferreira	Stadium: Heliodoro Rodríguez; Attendance: 15,000

24 February 1997 26	Valencia	2-1	SD Compostela	Valencia
	Leandro 15'; Engonga 65'		11' (pen.) Penev	Stadium: Mestalla; Attendance: 40,000

1 March 1997 27	CD Logroñés	2-1	Valencia	Logroño
	Castano 48'; Abadia 71'		12' Galvez	Stadium: Las Gaunas

8 March 1997 28	Valencia	4-2	Sevilla CF	Valencia
	Galvez 4'; Ortega 45', 90' (pen.); Leandro 90'		33' Tsartas; 68' Galvan	Stadium: Mestalla

15 March 1997 29	Atlético Madrid	1-4	Valencia	Madrid
	Caminero 51'		Ortega 8'; Eskurza 26'; Jose Ignacio 35'; Leandro 90'	Stadium: Vicente Calderón; Attendance: 40,000

24 March 1997 30	Sporting Gijón	2-1	Valencia	Gijón
	Tomas 42'; Luna 47'		85' Vlaovic	Stadium: El Molinón; Attendance: 14,000

30 March 1997 31	Valencia	1-1	FC Barcelona	Valencia
	40' Leandro		Ronaldo 69'	Stadium: Mestalla; Attendance: 45,000

6 April 1997 32	Real Valladolid	4-1	Valencia	Valladolid
	Benjamin 12', 38'; Fernando 15'; Quevedo 68'		76' Vlaovic	Stadium: José Zorrilla; Attendance: 24,000

12 April 1997 33	Valencia	5-2	Athletic Bilbao	Valencia
	Ortega 2', 26' (pen.); Moya 29'; Leandro 3', 34'		43', 65' Urzaiz	Stadium: Mestalla; Attendance: 40,000

15 April 1997 34	Extremadura CF	1-0	Valencia	Almendralejo
	Juanito 24' (pen.)			Stadium: Francisco de la Hera; Attendance: 10,740

21 April 1997 35	Valencia	1-1	Real Madrid	Valencia
	Ortega 88' (pen.)		63' Raul	Stadium: Mestalla; Attendance: 45,000

4 May 1997 36	Celta Vigo	1-1	Valencia	Vigo
	Gudelj 2'		49' Leandro	Stadium: Balaídos; Attendance: 20,000

12 May 1997 37	Valencia	1-1	Deportivo La Coruña	Valencia
	Ortega 30' (pen.)		17' Renaldo	Stadium: Mestalla

18 May 1997 38	Hércules CF	0-2	Valencia	Alicante
			65' Farinos; 73'Vlaovic	Stadium: José Rico Pérez; Attendance: 9,000

26 May 1997 39	Valencia	1-1	Real Betis	Valencia
	Vlaovic 69'		9' Cañas	Stadium: Mestalla; Attendance: 40,000

31 May 1997 40	Rayo Vallecano	3-1	Valencia	Madrid
	Klimowicz; Jose Maria		89' Patxi Ferreira	Stadium: Vallecas

15 June 1997 41	Valencia	2-1	Real Oviedo	Valencia
	Leandro 12'; Karpin 70'		33' Oli	Stadium: Mestalla; Attendance: 40,000

21 June 1997 42	RCD Espanyol	3-2	Valencia	Barcelona
	Ouedec 52'; Pralija 56'; Cobos 58'		27' (pen.) Vlaovic; 77'Ivan Campo	Stadium: Sarrià; Attendance: 30,000

Source: Competitive Matches

=== Copa del Rey ===
==== First round ====
29 January 1997	UD Las Palmas	0-2	Valencia	Palma de Mallorca

5 February 1997	Valencia	0-2	UD Las Palmas	Valencia
				Stadium: Mestalla

=== UEFA Cup ===
==== Round of 64 ====
10 September 1996	Valencia (Spain)	3-0	(Germany) Bayern München	Valencia
				Stadium: Mestalla

24 September 1996	Bayern München (Germany)	1-0	(Spain) Valencia	München
				Stadium: Olympiastadion

==== Round of 32 ====
15 October 1996	Slavia Prague (Czech Republic)	0-1	(Spain) Valencia	Prague

29 October 1996	Valencia (Spain)	0-0	(Czech Republic) Slavia Prague	Valencia
				Stadium: Mestalla

==== Eightfinals ====
19 November 1996	Valencia (Spain)	3-1	(Turkey) Beşiktaş	Valencia

3 December 1996	Beşiktaş (Turkey)	2-2	(Spain) Valencia	Istanbul

==== Quarterfinals ====
4 March 1997	Schalke 04 (Germany)	2-0	(Spain) Valencia	Gelsenkirchen

4 March 1997	Valencia (Spain)	1-1	(Germany) Schalke 04	Valencia
				Stadium: Mestalla

== Statistics ==
=== Players statistics ===
No.	Pos	Nat	Player	Total		La Liga		Copa del Rey		UEFA Cup	
No.	Pos	Nat	Player	Apps	Goals	Apps	Goals	Apps	Goals	Apps	Goals
1	GK	(Spain) ESP	Zubizarreta	49	-62	41	-56	2	-2	6	-4
3	DF	(Spain) ESP	Otero	30	0	22	0	2	0	6	0
15	DF	(Spain) ESP	Ferreira	44	5	36	4	0+1	0	7	1
2	DF	(Spain) ESP	Engonga	44	3	35	2	2	0	7	1
21	DF	(Spain) ESP	Romero	40	2	31	2	1	0	8	0
6	MF	(Spain) ESP	Mendieta	36	1	22+8	1	0	0	5+1	0
18	MF	(Russia) RUS	Karpin	46	6	35+1	6	2	0	8	0
14	MF	(Spain) ESP	José Ignacio	42	1	27+7	1	2	0	2+4	0
10	MF	(Spain) ESP	Fernando	36	1	21+8	1	0+1	0	6	0
8	FW	(Spain) ESP	Moya	44	9	30+5	7	1+1	0	5+2	2
16	FW	(Argentina) ARG	Claudio	40	5	23+9	3	2	0	6	2
13	GK	(Spain) ESP	Bartual	5	-6	1+1	-3	0	0	2+1	-3
24	DF	(Argentina) ARG	Cáceres	26	0	22	0	2	0	2	0
12	MF	(Spain) ESP	Eskurza	28	1	16+9	1	0	0	3	0
19	FW	(Croatia) CRO	Vlaović	31	10	16+8	8	0	0	2+5	2
9	MF	(Brazil) BRA	Leandro	27	10	16+7	8	1+1	2	2	0
31	MF	(Spain) ESP	Farinos	19	1	15+3	1	0+1	0		
5	MF	(Spain) ESP	Poyatos	27	2	10+10	1	0	0	6+1	1
	FW	(Argentina) ARG	Ortega	12	7	12	7				
22	MF	(Spain) ESP	Gálvez	25	4	5+14	4	1	0	1+4	0
2	DF	(Spain) ESP	Javi Navarro	14	0	5+7	0	0	0	1+1	0
17	FW	(Spain) ESP	Hurtado	18	1	0+14	1	1+1	0	0+2	0
7	FW	(Spain) ESP	Sietes	11	0	4+5	0	0	0	0+2	0
12	DF	(Spain) ESP	Iván Campo	9	1	2+5	1	1	0	0+1	0
11	FW	(Brazil) BRA	Romário	5	4	5	4				
4	DF	(Spain) ESP	Camarasa	7	0	5	0	2	0		
30	FW	(Spain) ESP	Navarro	2	0	0+2	0				
33	DF	(Spain) ESP	Lopez	1	0	0+1	0				
26	FW	(Spain) ESP	Raúl Martínez	0	0	0	0				

- Source: https://www.bdfutbol.com/en/t/t1996-9736.html

== See also ==
- Valencia CF
- 1996–97 La Liga
- 1996–97 Copa del Rey
