= Marcelinho Carioca =

Brazilian footballer

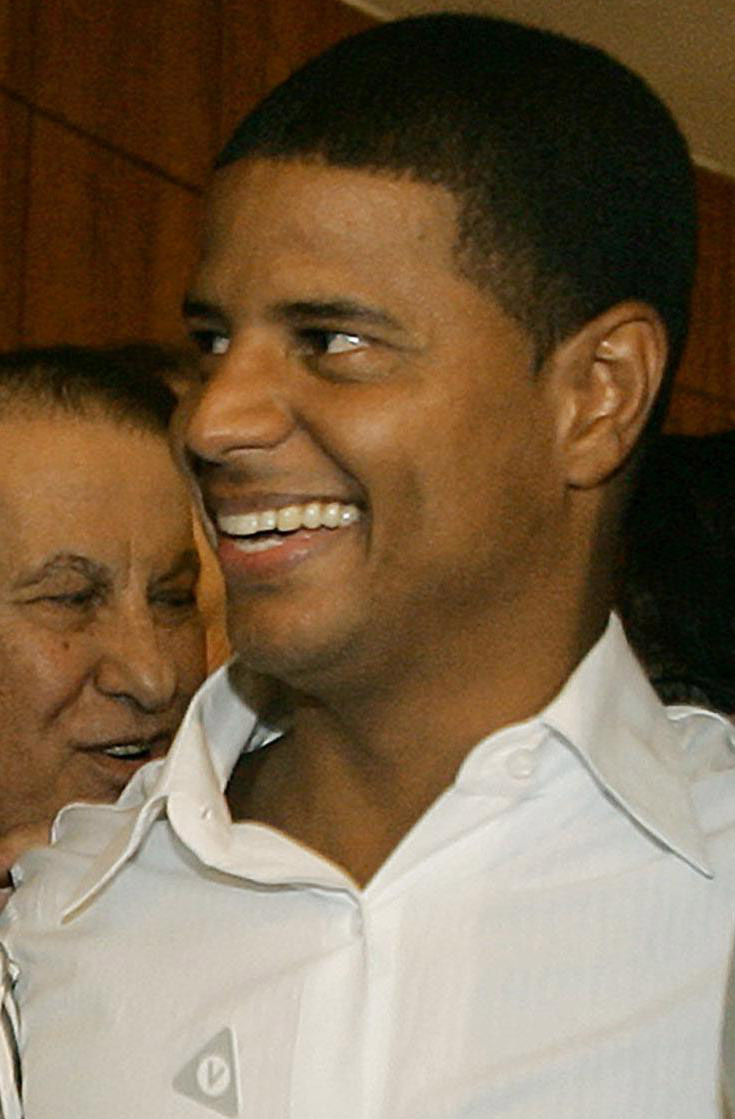

Personal information
- Full name: Marcelo Pereira Surcin
- Date of birth: 1 February 1971 (age 55)
- Place of birth: Rio de Janeiro, Brazil
- Height: 1.68 m (5 ft 6 in)
- Position: Attacking midfielder

Senior career*
Years	Team	Apps	(Gls)
1988–1993	Flamengo	122	(26)
1994–1997	Corinthians	154	(70)
1997	Valencia	5	(0)
1998–2001	Corinthians	131	(73)
2001	Santos	15	(5)
2002	Gamba Osaka	21	(3)
2003	Vasco da Gama	31	(16)
2003	Al Nassr	6	(3)
2004	Vasco da Gama	3	(1)
2004	Ajaccio	10	(2)
2005	Brasiliense	26	(9)
2006	Corinthians	5	(0)
2007–2009	Santo André	97	(17)
Total		632	(228)

International career
1994–2001	Brazil	4	(2)
- * Club domestic league appearances and goals

Marcelo Pereira Surcin (born 1 February 1971), known as Marcelinho Carioca, is a Brazilian former professional footballer who played as an attacking midfielder. A technically gifted and prolific goalscoring midfielder, he was known for his vision, passing range, accurate crossing, long-range shooting and ability to find space in attacking positions. He was also noted for his confidence, leadership and capacity to influence decisive moments in matches.

Widely regarded as one of the greatest free-kick takers of all time, Marcelinho was nicknamed Pé de Anjo ("Angel's Foot") for the accuracy and variety of his set-piece deliveries.

Marcelinho had four separate spells at Corinthians, scoring 206 goals in 420 matches for the Timão from 1994 to 2001 and winning eight trophies, including two consecutive national titles and the inaugural FIFA Club World Cup in 2000, but never succeeded internationally due to his difficult character and falling-outs with national team coaches.

== Club career ==
=== Corinthians ===
After winning 1990 Brazilian Cup, 1991 Rio de Janeiro State Championship and 1992 Brazilian National Championship as a Flamengo player, Marcelinho Carioca signed his first contract with Corinthians—who bought him from Flamengo for US$500.000,00 in December 1993. In mid-1997, after winning the Brazilian Cup (Copa do Brasil) and the São Paulo State Championship (Campeonato Paulista), he was sold to Valencia (ESP) for US$7,000,000 where he would become a teammate of Romário. With the Mestalla side he would play 11 games, of which five would be on La Liga, and scored one single goal, against Hércules in the Copa Generalitat.

After this spell, unsuccessfully came back to Corinthians in the end of the year. Back to "Parque São Jorge" he was two times champion of the national championship (Campeonato Brasileiro, 98 and 99), one time state champion (2001), and raised the trophy of the first FIFA world club championship in 2000.

The second time he left the team seemed to be for good. After a few conflicts with teammates in mid-2001, he was accused of denigrating the clubs image, and left the squad. After training alone for some time in the club, he won in justice the opportunity to play for Santos FC, where he stayed for six months. In a legal dispute (for the 2001 incident), Corinthians won in first instance, obliging the player to pay R$9.000.000.

In February 2006, as part of a deal, he signed his third contract with Corinthians but only six months later, as of the arrival and request of manager Émerson Leão, Marcelinho Carioca was released. He was signed by Santo André the following year, where he stayed until 2009 winning promotion to Brazilian First Division in 2008 but being relegated the following year. He played a farewell match for Corinthians early in 2010 in a friendly against Huracán.

In 2012, he played four games for the Corinthians beach soccer team.

== International career ==
Marcelinho made four appearances and scored two goals for the Brazil national football team between 1994 and 2002. He made his senior debut in a friendly victory over Yugoslavia in December 1994, while his final appearance came against Peru during the 2002 World Cup qualifiers.

== Career statistics ==
=== Club ===
Appearances and goals by club, season and competition
Club	Season	League			State league		Cup		Continental		Other		Total	
Club	Season	Division	Apps	Goals	Apps	Goals	Apps	Goals	Apps	Goals	Apps	Goals	Apps	Goals
Flamengo	1988	Série A	5	0	–		–		–		–		5	0
Flamengo	1989	Série A	8	1	–		4	0	–		7	0	19	1
Flamengo	1990	Série A	9	0	9	3	5	1	–		12	2	35	6
Flamengo	1991	Série A	17	3	18	5	–		9	5	27	5	71	18
Flamengo	1992	Série A	5	1	17	3	–		–		14	2	36	6
Flamengo	1993	Série A	19	5	15	5	5	0	8	2	29	6	76	18
Flamengo	Total		63	10	59	16	14	1	17	7	89	15	242	49
Corinthians	1994	Série A	25	8	26	12	4	2	4	4	7	5	66	31
Corinthians	1995	Série A	16	5	32	14	8	6	4	1	–		60	26
Corinthians	1996	Série A	12	1	22	19	4	1	10	4	–		48	25
Corinthians	1997	Série A	–		21	11	2	1	–		2	0	25	12
Corinthians	Total		53	14	101	56	18	10	18	9	9	5	199	94
Valencia	1997–98	La Liga	5	0	–		1	0	–		–		6	0
Corinthians	1998	Série A	28	19	13	3	3	3	4	2	4	1	52	28
Corinthians	1999	Série A	26	15	16	8	5	2	16	4	6	2	69	31
Corinthians	2000	Série A	15	4	15	13	–		15	4	4	0	49	21
Corinthians	2001	Série A	–		18	11	9	6	–		4	0	31	17
Corinthians	Total		69	38	62	35	17	11	35	10	18	3	201	97
Santos	2001	Série A	15	5	–		–		–		–		15	5
Gamba Osaka	2002	J. League Division 1	21	3	–		–		–		6	4	27	7
Vasco da Gama	2003	Série A	18	9	13	7	5	0	–		–		36	16
Al-Nassr	2003–04	Saudi Premier League	12	6	–		–		–		–		12	6
Vasco da Gama	2004	Série A	1	0	2	1	2	1	–		–		5	2
Ajaccio	2004–05	Ligue 1	10	2	–		–		–		–		10	2
Brasiliense	2005	Série A	26	9	–		–		–		–		26	9
Corinthians	2006	Série A	5	0	–		–		–		–		5	0
Santo André	2007	Série B	8	0	–		–		–		–		8	0
Santo André	2008	Série B	31	8	13	3	–		–		–		44	11
Santo André	2009	Série A	32	5	13	1	–		–		–		45	6
Santo André	Total		71	13	26	4	–		–		–		97	17
Career total			369	109	263	119	57	23	70	26	122	27	881	304

=== International ===
Appearances and goals by national team and year
National team	Year	Apps	Goals
Brazil	1994	1	0
Brazil	1995	0	0
Brazil	1996	0	0
Brazil	1997	0	0
Brazil	1998	2	2
Brazil	1999	0	0
Brazil	2000	0	0
Brazil	2001	1	0
Total		4	2

== Honours ==
Flamengo

- Série A: 1992
- Copa do Brasil: 1990
- Campeonato Carioca: 1991

Corinthians

- Série A: 1998, 1999
- Copa do Brasil: 1995
- Campeonato Paulista: 1995, 1997, 1999, 2001
- Copa Bandeirantes: 1994
- Troféu Ramón de Carranza: 1996
- FIFA Club World Cup: 2000

Vasco da Gama

- Campeonato Carioca: 2003

Brasiliense

- Campeonato Brasiliense: 2005

Santo André

- Campeonato Paulista Serie A2: 2008

Individual

- Bola de Ouro: 1999
- Bola de Prata: 1994, 1999, 2003
- South American Team of the Year: 1998
- All-time official free-kick top goalscorer in football history: 78 goals
