= Ariel Ortega =

Argentine footballer

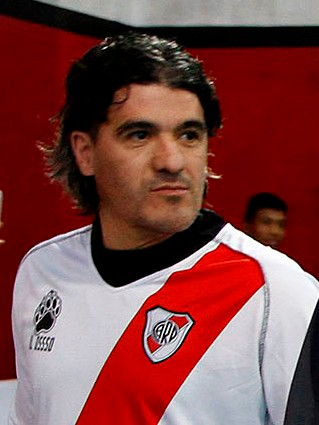
- Ortega in 2013

Personal information
- Full name: Arnaldo Ariel Ortega
- Date of birth: 4 March 1974 (age 52)
- Place of birth: Ledesma, Jujuy, Argentina
- Height: 1.70 m (5 ft 7 in)
- Positions: Attacking midfielder; forward

Youth career
- 1988–1990: Atlético Ledesma

Senior career*
Years	Team	Apps	(Gls)
1991–1996	River Plate	134	(30)
1997–1998	Valencia	32	(9)
1998–1999	Sampdoria	27	(8)
1999–2000	Parma	18	(3)
2000–2002	River Plate	56	(23)
2002–2003	Fenerbahçe	14	(5)
2004–2006	Newell's Old Boys	53	(11)
2006–2012	River Plate	82	(12)
2008–2009	→ CSIR (loan)	25	(4)
2011	→ All Boys (loan)	12	(0)
2011–2012	→ Def. Belgrano (loan)	27	(4)
Total		480	(109)

International career
1993–2010	Argentina	88	(17)
Medal record
Men's football
Representing Argentina
Pan American Games
Gold medal – first place	1995 Mar del Plata	Team
Olympic Games
Silver medal – second place	1996 Atlanta	Team
- * Club domestic league appearances and goals

Arnaldo Ariel Ortega (born 4 March 1974) is an Argentine former professional footballer who played as an attacking midfielder. His nickname is "El Burrito" (The Little Donkey), thus he is called Burrito Ortega. After his breakthrough alongside coach Ramón Díaz in the mid-90s, he came to be considered at his peak as one of the best dribblers in the world, to the point that he is the fourth player in World Cup history with more successful dribbles in a single World Cup according to FIFA.

Ortega began his career with River Plate and played most of his career there during four separate spells between 1991 and 1996, 2000–02, 2006–08 and 2009–11. With the team, he played 359 competitive matches, scored 81 goals, and won several trophies, including the 1996 Copa Libertadores. In Europe, Ortega played for Valencia in Spain, Parma and Sampdoria in Italy, and Fenerbahçe in Turkey. He also had a two-year period with Newell's Old Boys, as well as three short loans from River Plate at other Argentinian teams towards the end of his career. He retired from professional football in 2012.

An Argentina international, Ortega played 88 times and scored 17 goals for his country between 1993 and 2010. He represented them at the 1994, 1998, and 2002 World Cups. He also appeared at the 1995 and 1999 Copa Américas, and was a member of the team that won the silver medal at the 1996 Summer Olympics.

== Club career ==
=== Beginnings in Argentina ===
Ortega began his professional football career in 1991 with Argentine club River Plate. With the club, he won the Primera División in 1991, 1993, 1994 and 1996, as well as the Copa Libertadores in 1996. He lost out on the 1996 Intercontinental Cup final to Juventus.

=== Europe ===
Ortega left Argentina in 1996. He played 1 1/2 seasons for Valencia before being signed by Sampdoria in 1998 for 23 billion Italian lire (£8 million), replacing Juan Sebastián Verón. After the club was relegated to Serie B, Ortega joined Parma, rejoining national and former club teammate Hernán Crespo, replacing Verón again who left for Lazio. Parma paid Sampdoria 28 billion lire (£9.4 million). However, in the following season he returned to Argentina with River Plate, to compensate the unpaid 12 billion lire transfer fees of Crespo (the 10% of the transfer fees to Lazio). Claudio Husaín also joined the club. River Plate acquired 50% registration rights of Ortega for a reported 5.5 million dollars. While, in Parma annual filing to Italian government, Ortega was sold for eleven billion lire.

=== Fenerbahçe and ban ===
In May 2002, Fenerbahçe signed Ortega from River Plate for a fee of US$7,500,000 (US$2,500,000 of which was paid to Parma). Fenerbahçe also bought his image rights for a further US$1,500,000. Ortega signed a 4-year contract. He was one of the key players of the team, scoring 5 goals in 14 matches.

Fenerbahçe were forced to file a complaint to FIFA in April 2003 as Ortega had failed to return from international duty since 12 February 2003. In June 2003 the FIFA Dispute Resolution Committee (DRC) ordered Ortega to pay Fenerbahçe USD 11,000,000 as compensation for breach of an employment contract and suspended him until 30 December 2003. Ortega appealed to the Court of Arbitration for Sport in July 2003 but the case was dismissed on 5 November. Ortega served a 4-month suspension from that day. After the ban he was without a club.

=== Return to Argentina ===
In 2004, when he could finally come back to football, he joined Newell's Old Boys after he was called by his friend Américo Gallego, who at the time was Newell's' coach. Newell paid an unknown sum to Fenerbahçe as part compensation for what Ortega owed the club. They won the Apertura 2004.

In June 2006, he went back to his first team River Plate, where he played for about half of the Apertura 2006, before he stopped to begin treatment for alcoholism. In January 2007, during River's pre-season in Mar del Plata, and one day after playing an excellent game in which he scored, he surprised everyone with another alcoholic episode, after which River Plate's doctors suggested to the coach that Ortega should go back to Buenos Aires to resume treatment for his problem.

Coach Daniel Passarella later brought Ortega back, stating he was ready for a comeback. On 15 March 2007, in a Copa Libertadores 2007 match against LDU Quito, Ortega formed part of River's bench but was not given a chance to play. However, three days later, in a league match versus Quilmes, he came on during the second half to help break the opposing team's defense in a tight 0–0 up to that point. Ortega scored a controversial goal with his hand, in the 93rd minute, to give River the victory and himself a great comeback.

Upon the arrival of Diego Simeone as head coach of River, Ortega allegedly lost some "protections" he was rumoured to have and, despite being an important part of the team that achieved the Clausura 2008 title, Simeone left him out of the squad for the upcoming season, reasoning his decision on Ortega having several times not come to train as well as some episodes of alcoholism. After some controversy and rumours in the winter window of Argentine market, he was loaned to Nacional B side Independiente Rivadavia, signing a one-year contract where a twice a week trip to a Chilean Special Treatment Center for alcoholics is one of the clauses. On 1 May 2009 he was let go by Independiente officials. The club decided to terminate his contract in advance. Ortega was on loan from River Plate. On his first game back in River Plate, 25 July 2009, he scored an outstanding chip shot goal to give River a 1–0 victory over Everton of England in Edmonton, Canada during the pre-season. In the 2009 Apertura, Ortega scored a wonder lobbed goal against Chacarita Juniors to give River Plate a 4–3 victory. Later in the tournament, he scored a last minute equalizer against Estudiantes.

In the 2010 Clausura, Ortega started River's first two matches, but suffered another alcoholic relapse and missed the next ten games before returning against Newell's Old Boys in the 13th round of matches.

In 2011, he was loaned to Defensores de Belgrano.

On 8 April 2012, Fox Sports Argentina journalist Juan José Buscalia, confirmed that Ortega would join Chilean Primera División club Unión San Felipe in June 2012.

== International career ==
Ortega was included in the squad for the 1994 World Cup. His debut in the starting eleven occurred on 3 July 1994 when Argentina was knocked out of the competition by Romania. He also reached the final of the 1995 King Fahd Cup with Argentina, and he won a Silver Olympic medal at the 1996 Olympics in Atlanta.

Ortega was handed the number 10 shirt for the 1998 FIFA World Cup, where he was expected to carry the mantle of the team's playmaker, and it was his first World Cup as an established star. Despite impressing in the early rounds to be considered a favorite as player of the tournament, Ortega was most notable for his sending-off in the quarter-finals against the Netherlands. Ortega received a second yellow card for head-butting Dutch goalkeeper Edwin van der Sar when van der Sar confronted him after a dive in the penalty area, for which Ortega was just getting his first yellow card. Shortly after Ortega's sending-off, Dennis Bergkamp scored the winning goal to make it 2–1, eliminating Argentina.

Ortega was also a member of the squad for the 2002 World Cup. Ortega missed a penalty in the last match against Sweden, which was then followed up and converted into the back of the net by Hernan Crespo, nonetheless the result meant that Argentina was knocked out in the first round.

On 24 September 2009, he was recalled to the Argentina national first-team squad, but had to miss the friendly match against Ghana due to an injury he picked up during the weekend in the Argentine Domestic League.

In April 2010, 17 years after his Argentina debut, Ortega received a call-up again, this time against Haiti. All the players in Diego Maradona's squad were from the Primera División Argentina. He played the match as starting XI on 5 May.

== Style of play ==
Ortega's gymnastic dribbling mesmerised the Monumental faithful, as he tricked and feinted past defences like an antelope evading a pride of lions. Countless defenders were left embarrassed in his wake as his stocky legs twisted one way before carrying the ball in another. For vast swathes of those early years, he was simply unplayable, a fireball of talent and machismo streaking easily past powerless opponents.

— Christopher Weir, These Football Times

Ortega was known for his pace, mobility, dribbling ability, set-piece delivery, ball control, body feints, and chipped finishes. During his prime, he was widely regarded as one of the world's finest dribblers, and was described by FIFA as "the king of the dribble". A classic Argentine enganche, he was primarily deployed as an attacking midfielder, but he also operated effectively as a right winger during his early career and as a supporting forward. He was recognized for his vision and passing range, which led to early comparisons with Diego Maradona.

Revered by River Plate fans who nicknamed him El Mas Grande (The Greatest), his playing style was characterized by a combination of spectacular skill, creativity, and a combative nature on the pitch. However, Ortega's career was also marked by disciplinary issues and inconsistency, and some commentators felt that he did not fully realize the potential he had displayed early in his career.

== Career statistics ==
=== Club ===
Appearances and goals by club, season and competition
Club	Season	League			National cup (Note: Includes Copa Argentina, Copa del Rey, Coppa Italia)		Continental		Other		Total	
Club	Season	Division	Apps	Goals	Apps	Goals	Apps	Goals	Apps	Goals	Apps	Goals
River Plate	1991–92	Primera División	14	1	–		–		–		14	1
River Plate	1992–93	Primera División	27	5	–		7	1	–		34	6
River Plate	1993–94	Primera División	29	4	–		4	0	7 (Note: Appearance in Copa Centenario de la AFA)	3 (Note: Goals in Copa Centenario de la AFA)	40	8
River Plate	1994–95	Primera División	25	7	–		8	1	–		33	8
River Plate	1995–96	Primera División	23	7	–		22	3	–		45	10
River Plate	1996–97	Primera División	16	6	–		3	0	–		19	6
River Plate	Total		134	30	—		44	5	7	3	185	39
Valencia	1996–97	La Liga	12	7	–		–		–		12	7
Valencia	1997–98	La Liga	20	2	3	0	–		–		23	2
Valencia	Total		32	9	3	0	–		–		35	9
Sampdoria	1998–99	Serie A	27	8	4	1	–		–		31	9
Parma	1999–2000	Serie A	18	3	1	0	7 (Note: Two appearances in UEFA Champions League, five appearances in UEFA Cup)	0	1 (Note: Appearance in Supercoppa Italiana)	0	27	3
River Plate	2000–01	Primera División	27	9	–		12	3	–		39	12
River Plate	2001–02	Primera División	29	14	–		10	2	–		39	16
River Plate	Total		56	23	—		22	5	–		78	28
Fenerbahçe	2002–03	Süper Lig	14	5	–		6 (Note: Two appearances in UEFA Champions League, four appearances in UEFA Cup)	0	–		20	5
Newell's Old Boys	2004–05	Primera División	24	5	—		–		–		24	5
Newell's Old Boys	2005–06	Primera División	29	6	—		7	0	–		36	6
Newell's Old Boys	Total		53	11	—		7	0	–		60	11
River Plate	2006–07	Primera División	18	4	—		3	0	–		21	4
River Plate	2007–08	Primera División	26	4	—		9	2	–		35	6
Independiente Rivadavia (loan)	2008–09	Primera B Nacional	25	4	—		–		–		25	4
River Plate	2009–10	Primera División	22	3	—		2	0	–		24	3
River Plate	2010–11	Primera División	16	1	—		–		—		16	1
River Plate	Total		82	12	—		14	2	–		96	14
All Boys (loan)	2010–11	Primera División	12	0	—		–		–		12	0
Def. Belgrano (loan)	2011–12	Primera B Metropolitana	27	4	1	0	–		–		28	4
Career total			480	109	9	1	100	12	8	3	597	126

=== International ===
Appearances and goals by national team and year
National team	Year	Apps	Goals
Argentina	1993	1	0
Argentina	1994	10 (Note: Three appearances in 1994 FIFA World Cup)	1
Argentina	1995	16 (Note: Four appearances in 1995 Copa América)	2
Argentina	1996	7	3
Argentina	1997	9	1
Argentina	1998	13 (Note: Five appearances and 2 goals in 1998 FIFA World Cup)	5
Argentina	1999	8 (Note: One appearance in 1999 Copa América)	2
Argentina	2000	11	3
Argentina	2001	7	0
Argentina	2002	4 (Note: Three appearances in 2002 FIFA World Cup)	0
Argentina	2003	1	0
Argentina	2004	0	0
Argentina	2005	0	0
Argentina	2006	0	0
Argentina	2007	0	0
Argentina	2008	0	0
Argentina	2009	0	0
Argentina	2010	1	0
Total		88	17

Scores and results list Argentina's goal tally first, score column indicates score after each Ortega goal.

List of international goals scored by Ariel Ortega
No.	Date	Venue	Opponent	Score	Result	Competition
1	27 December 1994	Buenos Aires, Argentina	Yugoslavia	1–0	1–0	Friendly
2	8 January 1995	Riyadh, Saudi Arabia	Japan	2–0	5–1	1995 King Fahd Cup
3	20 September 1995	Madrid, Spain	Spain	1–2	1–2	Friendly
4	24 April 1996	Buenos Aires, Argentina	Bolivia	1–0	3–1	1998 FIFA World Cup qualification
5	24 April 1996	Buenos Aires, Argentina	Bolivia	2–0	3–1	1998 FIFA World Cup qualification
6	9 October 1996	San Cristóbal, Venezuela	Venezuela	1–1	5–2	1998 FIFA World Cup qualification
7	30 April 1997	Buenos Aires, Argentina	Ecuador	1–0	2–1	1998 FIFA World Cup qualification
8	22 April 1998	Dublin, Ireland	Republic of Ireland	2–0	2–0	Friendly
9	14 May 1998	La Plata, Argentina	Bosnia and Herzegovina	4–0	5–0	Friendly
10	25 May 1998	Buenos Aires, Argentina	South Africa	2–0	2–0	Friendly
11	21 June 1998	Paris, France	Jamaica	1–0	5–0	1998 FIFA World Cup
12	21 June 1998	Paris, France	Jamaica	2–0	5–0	1998 FIFA World Cup
13	7 September 1999	Porto Alegre, Brazil	Brazil	2–4	2–4	Friendly
14	13 October 1999	La Plata, Argentina	Colombia	2–1	2–1	Friendly
15	26 April 2000	Maracaibo, Venezuela	Venezuela	2–0	4–0	2002 FIFA World Cup qualification
16	26 April 2000	Maracaibo, Venezuela	Venezuela	3–0	4–0	2002 FIFA World Cup qualification
17	15 November 2000	Santiago, Chile	Chile	1–0	2–0	2002 FIFA World Cup qualification

== Honours ==
River Plate

- Primera División: 1991 Apertura, 1993 Apertura, 1994 Apertura, 1996 Apertura, 2002 Clausura, 2008 Clausura
- Copa Libertadores: 1996
- Intercontinental Cup runner-up: 1996

Parma

- Supercoppa Italiana: 1999

Newell's Old Boys

- Primera División: 2004 Apertura

Argentina

- Pan American Games gold medal 1995
- Summer Olympics silver medal: 1996

Individual

- South American Team of the Year: 1994, 1996, 2001
