= Claudio López (footballer) =

Argentine footballer (born 1974)

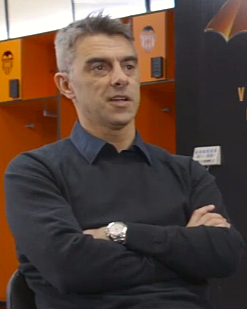
- López in 2019

Personal information
- Full name: Claudio Javier López
- Date of birth: 17 July 1974 (age 52)
- Place of birth: Río Tercero, Argentina
- Height: 1.78 m (5 ft 10 in)
- Position: Forward

Senior career*
Years	Team	Apps	(Gls)
1992–1996	Racing Club	116	(24)
1996–2000	Valencia	130	(47)
2000–2004	Lazio	106	(29)
2004–2007	América	75	(21)
2007–2008	Racing Club	34	(10)
2008–2009	Kansas City Wizards	57	(13)
2010	Colorado Rapids	11	(0)
Total		529	(144)

International career
1996	Argentina Olympic	17	(7)
1995–2003	Argentina	55	(10)
Medal record
Representing Argentina
Men's Football
Silver medal – second place	1996 Atlanta	Team
- * Club domestic league appearances and goals

Claudio Javier López (Spanish pronunciation: [ˈklawðjo ˈlopes], born 17 July 1974) is an Argentine former professional footballer, who played as a forward. Nicknamed Piojo (louse), he is best known for his spells with Valencia in Spain and Lazio in Italy. López also had a notable impact in the Argentina national team, participating in two World Cups.

== Club career ==
=== Early career ===
López began his professional career with Estudiantes de La Plata in his native Argentina in 1990 as a 16-year-old. However, he moved to Racing the next year, where he would remain until he transferred in 1996 to Spanish club Valencia.

=== Europe ===
After a slow start in 1996–97, Claudio López would enjoy a prolific spell with Valencia over the 3 years that followed, averaging 20 goals each season between 1997–98 and 1999–2000. That included a season best in 1998–99 which saw him find the net on 30 occasions across competitions to become the club's top scorer (3rd best in la Liga behind Raul and Rivaldo, despite taking fewer penalties than his rivals).

Valencia entrenched their status as one of Spain's emerging clubs throughout the late 1990s, rising from their usual mid-table position to 4th in 1998–99 and 3rd in 1999–2000, which was Lopez's last season with the club. The Argentine formed a devastating partnership with Romanian Adrian Ilie and played alongside such stars as Jocelyn Angloma, Santiago Cañizares and Gaizka Mendieta, who would later be his teammate at Lazio as well.

López remained with Valencia for four years, helping the team to the final of the UEFA Champions League in the 1999–2000 season, when he was transferred to Lazio of Serie A for €35 million. During the first half of his spell in Italy's capital, he was partnered with compatriot Hernán Crespo in the front-line. However, López suffered from injury problems during his time at Lazio. During the 2000–01 UEFA Champions League, he scored a direct goal from a corner kick against Anderlecht in the Stadio Olimpico.

After Crespo left for Inter Milan in the summer of 2002, López was partnered with newcomer Bernardo Corradi. They formed a solid partnership that yielded a combined 25 Serie A goals as Lazio finished 4th to qualify for the Champions League under new coach Roberto Mancini. The Argentine scored 15 of those goals, his best league tally during his years in Italy; the 4th-place finish for Lazio was also the best the club would achieve until 2011–12.

In December 2002 he made headlines during a Serie A clash with Inter that ended 3–3: after netting a hat-trick that gave his side a 3–0 lead, Claudio López improvised an "Aserejé" goal celebration with teammate Bernardo Corradi, inspired by the dance routine of Spanish band Las Ketchup. In an interview 13 years later, he explained that the unexpected celebration had happened because "crazy Corradi enjoyed doing such things!"

In the UEFA Cup, López found the net twice to help his team reach the semi-finals, where they would be knocked out by the eventual winners, Jose Mourinho's FC Porto. The following season was less successful for Lazio as they only finished 6th in Serie A and crashed out of the Champions League at the group stage. Claudio López only found the net 4 times in 36 appearances. He did manage, however, to win his second piece of silverware with the Roman club as they overcame Juventus in the two-legged Coppa Italia final.

=== Mexico, return to Racing ===
López joined Club América for the 2004 Apertura, where he played in 17 games, scoring four goals. The following season, Clausura 2005 brought better results, with López scoring a total of 14 goals overall and helping the team to its tenth League championship in its history. It was his first and only league championship with any team. Claudio was instrumental to the team's success, also helping them win the CONCACAF Champions' Cup by scoring two goals in the Final over Tecos UAG. He played the 2006 FIFA Club World Cup.

In 2007 López returned to Racing, 11 years after his departure from the club, and the country. In most of those games, usually coming in as a late sub, López scored several important goals.

=== Major League Soccer ===
On 7 March 2008, it was announced López had signed with the Kansas City Wizards on a free transfer. López fell under the league's designated player qualification, which means only the first $415,000 of his salary counted against Kansas City Wizards’ team salary cap. He later had his contract restructured to take him below designated player status. He scored on his debut for Kansas City against D.C. United on 29 March 2008.

On 23 February 2010, the Argentine striker left after two seasons Kansas City Wizards. "We would have liked to have Claudio back in 2010, but unfortunately it became clear early in the contract negotiations that we could not give him what he desired," Wizards Manager Peter Vermes said.

López was later signed by league rivals Colorado Rapids on 2 April 2010.

After the 2010 MLS season Colorado declined López's contract option and Lopez elected to participate in the 2010 MLS Re-Entry Draft. López became a free agent in Major League Soccer when he was not selected in the Re-Entry draft.

== International career ==
López had a distinguished career with Argentina. After winning a silver medal with the Under-23 team during the 1996 Summer Olympics, López made appearances in both the 1998 and 2002 World Cups. He scored a goal against the Netherlands in the 1998 FIFA World Cup quarter-final, when he kicked the ball between Edwin van der Sar's legs to tie the match temporarily, although Argentina were ultimately defeated 2–1.

== Style of play ==
According to media López was capable of playing anywhere along the front-line, as a striker, in a supporting role, and on the wing. He was highly regarded for his pace, technique, and dribbling skills, as well as his powerful striking ability with his left foot. He was also an effective set-piece and penalty taker. Throughout his career, he was known by the nickname "El Piojo", meaning "the louse".

== Media ==
López was sponsored by sportswear company Nike and appeared in Nike commercials. In a global Nike advertising campaign in the run-up to the 2002 World Cup in Korea and Japan, he starred in a "Secret Tournament" commercial (branded "Scopion KO") directed by Terry Gilliam, appearing alongside football players such as Thierry Henry, Ronaldo, Edgar Davids, Fabio Cannavaro, Francesco Totti, Ronaldinho, Luís Figo and Hidetoshi Nakata, with former player Eric Cantona the tournament "referee".

== Career statistics ==
=== Club ===
Appearances and goals by club, season and competition
Club	Season	League			Cup (Note: Includes Copa del Rey, Coppa Italia, Open Cup.)		Continental		Total	
Club	Season	Division	Apps	Goals	Apps	Goals	Apps	Goals	Apps	Goals
Racing	1992–93	Argentine Primera División	19	1	–		1	0	20	1
Racing	1993–94	Argentine Primera División	36	3	6	5	1	0	43	8
Racing	1994–95	Argentine Primera División	26	3	–		2	0	28	3
Racing	1995–96	Argentine Primera División	35	17	–		2	2	37	19
Racing	Total		116	24	6	5	6	2	128	31
Valencia	1996–97	La Liga	32	3	2	0	6	2	40	5
Valencia	1997–98	La Liga	32	12	5	0	–		37	12
Valencia	1998–99	La Liga	32	21	6	8	4	3	42	32
Valencia	1999–2000	La Liga	34	11	2	0	18	6	54	17
Valencia	Total		130	47	15	8	28	11	173	66
Lazio	2000–01 (Note: Stats do not include 1/2 in Supercoppa Italiana.)	Serie A	16	0	0	0	6	5	22	5
Lazio	2001–02	Serie A	29	10	1	0	8	2	38	12
Lazio	2002–03	Serie A	34	15	4	0	9	2	47	17
Lazio	2003–04	Serie A	27	4	5	0	4	0	36	4
Lazio	Total		106	29	10	0	27	9	143	38
América	2004–05	Mexican Primera División	33	13						
América	2005–06	Mexican Primera División	30	5						
América	2006–07	Mexican Primera División	12	3						
América	Total		75	21						
Racing	2006–07	Argentine Primera División	18	5						
Racing	2007–08	Argentine Primera División	16	5						
Racing	Total		34	10						
Kansas City Wizards	2008	Major League Soccer	28	6	2	1			30	7
Kansas City Wizards	2009	Major League Soccer	29	7	2	0			31	7
Kansas City Wizards	Total		57	13	4	1			61	14
Colorado Rapids	2010	Major League Soccer	11	0	2	0			13	0
Career total			529	144						

=== International ===
Appearances and goals by national team and year
National team	Year	Apps	Goals
Argentina	1995	2	0
Argentina	1996	4	0
Argentina	1997	8	2
Argentina	1998	12	3
Argentina	1999	4	0
Argentina	2000	8	2
Argentina	2001	8	3
Argentina	2002	6	0
Argentina	2003	2	0
Total		54	10

Scores and results list Argentina's goal tally first, score column indicates score after each López goal.

List of international goals scored by Claudio López
No.	Date	Venue	Opponent	Score	Result	Competition	Ref.
1	12 February 1997	Estadio Metropolitano, Barranquilla, Colombia	Colombia	1–0	1–0	1998 FIFA World Cup qualification	
2	10 September 1997	Estadio Nacional, Santiago, Chile	Chile	2–1	2–1	1998 FIFA World Cup qualification	
3	10 March 1998	José Amalfitani Stadium, Buenos Aires, Argentina	Bulgaria	2–0	2–0	Friendly	
4	29 April 1998	Maracanã Stadium, Rio de Janeiro, Brazil	Brazil	1–0	1–0	Friendly	
5	4 July 1998	Stade Vélodrome, Marseille, France	Netherlands	1–1	1–2	1998 FIFA World Cup	
6	29 March 2000	Estadio Monumental, Buenos Aires, Argentina	Chile	4–1	4–1	2002 FIFA World Cup qualification	
7	19 July 2000	Estadio Monumental, Buenos Aires, Argentina	Ecuador	2–0	2–0	2002 FIFA World Cup qualification	
8	3 June 2001	Estadio Monumental, Buenos Aires, Argentina	Colombia	2–0	3–0	2002 FIFA World Cup qualification	
9	8 November 2001	Estadio Monumental, Buenos Aires, Argentina	Peru	2–0	2–0	2002 FIFA World Cup qualification	
10	14 November 2001	Estadio Centenario, Montevideo, Uruguay	Uruguay	1–1	1–1	2002 FIFA World Cup qualification	

== Honours ==
Valencia

- Copa del Rey: 1998–99
- Supercopa de España: 1999
- UEFA Intertoto Cup: 1998
- UEFA Champions League runner-up: 1999–2000,

Lazio

- Coppa Italia: 2003–04
- Supercoppa Italiana: 2000

América

- Primera División de México: Clausura 2005
- Campeón de Campeones: 2005
- CONCACAF Champions' Cup: 2006

Colorado Rapids

- MLS Cup: 2010
- MLS Eastern Conference: 2010

Argentina

- Summer Olympics Silver Medal: 1996

== See also ==
- List of current MLS players with national team caps
