= Roberto Basílico =

Argentine footballer

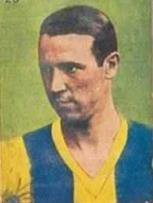

Personal information
- Date of birth: ?
- Place of birth: Buenos Aires, Argentina
- Place of death: Buenos Aires, Argentina
- Position: Defender

Youth career
- 1920s–1931: Club Atlético Atlanta

Senior career*
Years	Team	Apps	(Gls)
1931–1933	Club Atlético River Plate		
- * Club domestic league appearances and goals

Roberto Basílico was an Argentine footballer, who played in Atlanta and River Plate. He served as defender in the River team that won the first title of professionalism in 1932.

== Biography ==
Roberto Basílico was born in Buenos Aires. He began his career in Club Atlético Atlanta. In 1931 Basílico was hired by River team, who began incorporating several reinforcements overlooking the championship. On March 13, 1932, Basilico debuted as defender in a win over Chacarita Juniors 3–1. That same year River Plate played the championship game against Club Atlético Independiente. The match was played at the Gasómetro with a score of 3–0 in favor of River, with goals by Ferreyra, Peucelle, and Zatelli.

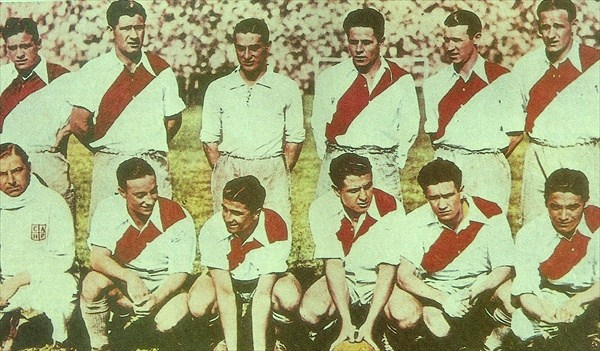
River Plate champion of 1932
