= Gustavo Campagnuolo =

Argentine footballer (born 1973)

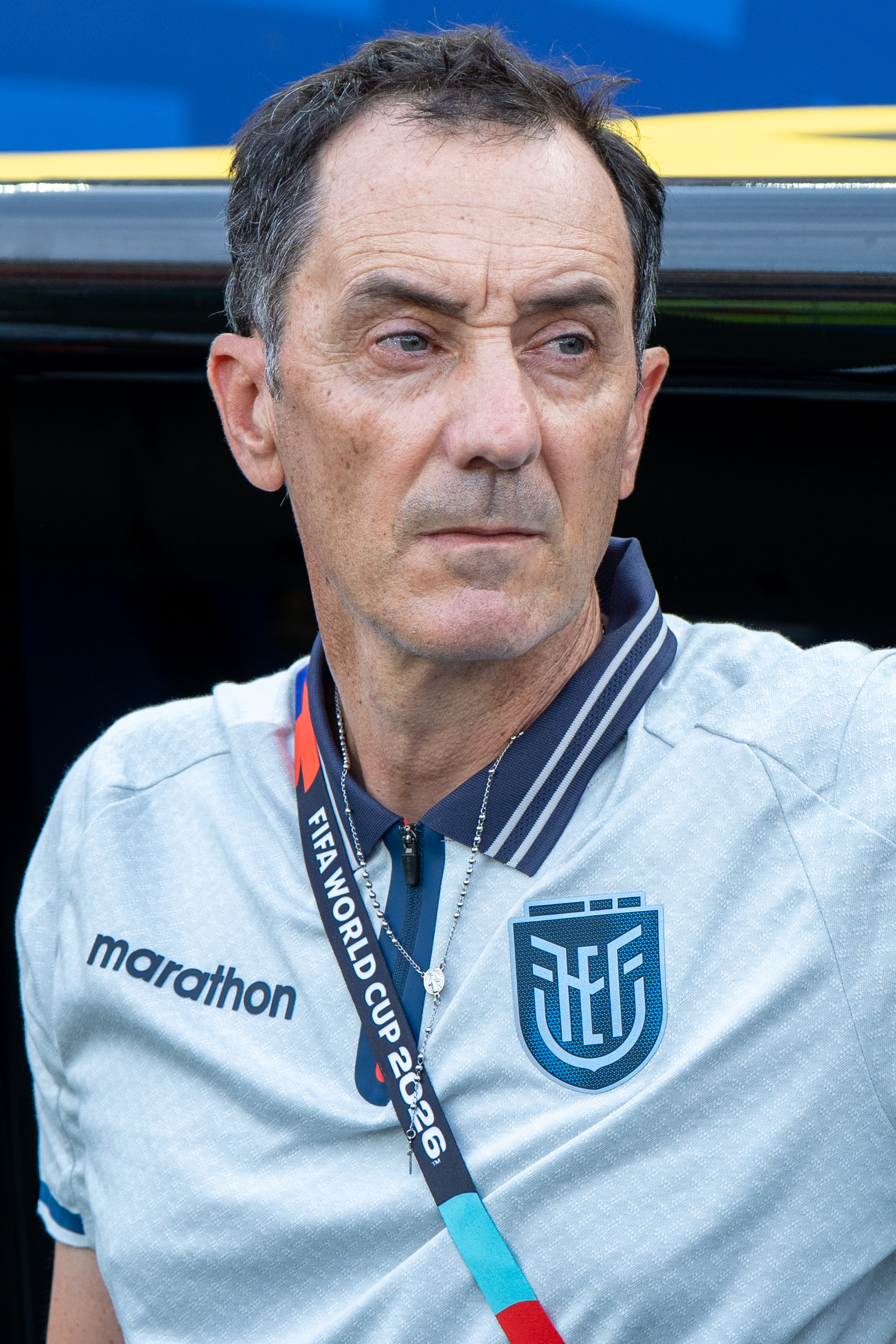

Personal information
- Full name: Gustavo Jorge Campagnuolo
- Date of birth: June 27, 1973 (age 53)
- Place of birth: Buenos Aires, Argentina
- Height: 1.89 m (6 ft 2 in)
- Position: Goalkeeper

Senior career*
Years	Team	Apps	(Gls)
1994–1997	Deportivo Español	75	(0)
1997–1998	Valencia	2	(0)
1998–2001	San Lorenzo	51	(0)
2001–2003	Racing Club	71	(0)
2003–2005	Tigres	47	(0)
2005–2009	Racing Club	79	(0)
2009–2010	San Lorenzo	0	(0)

Managerial career
- 2011–2012: Banfield (gk coach)
- 2012–2015: San Lorenzo (gk coach)
- 2016–2017: Argentina (gk coach)
- 2019: Huracán (gk coach)
- 2020–2022: Vélez Sarsfield (gk coach)
- * Club domestic league appearances and goals

Gustavo Jorge Campagnuolo (born June 27, 1973) is an Argentine former professional footballer who played as a goalkeeper, spending much of his career with Racing Club.

== Playing career ==
Born in Buenos Aires, Campagnuolo started his playing career in 1994 for Deportivo Español. During the 1997–98 season he played for Valencia of Spain, but returned to Argentina after only making two league appearances for the club. His spell at Valencia was unsuccessful, and he is remembered for being the team's goalkeeper in a 6–0 defeat to Salamanca at El Helmántico.

Between 1998 and 2001, Campagnuolo played for San Lorenzo where he was part of the team that won the Clausura 2001 tournament. After this success, he joined Racing Club, where he was part of the team that won the Apertura 2001, which was the first league title for Racing in 35 years.

Between 2003 and 2005, he played in Mexico for Tigres, before returning to Racing Club. In 2009, he returned to San Lorenzo, where he played until his retirement in 2010.

== Coaching career ==
After retiring at the end of the 2009–10 season, Campagnuolo started working as a goalkeeper coach for Banfield. In 2012, he returned to his former club San Lorenzo, still as a goalkeeper coach. In 2016, he worked under manager Edgardo Bauza with the Argentina national football team as goalkeeper coach until April 2017, when Bauza was sacked. He then moved to Huracán, where he served for a few months.

Ahead of the 2019–20 season, he returned to San Lorenzo as a goalkeeper coach under the staff of Juan Antonio Pizzi. Pizzi and his staff, including Campagnuolo, was fired on 31 October 2019.

On 17 April 2020, Campagnuolo was appointed goalkeeper coach of Vélez Sarsfield under manager Mauricio Pellegrino. Pellegrino and his staff, including Campagnuolo, was fired in March 2022.

== Honours ==
Season	Team	Title
1998	Valencia CF	UEFA Intertoto Cup
Clausura 2001	San Lorenzo	Primera División Argentina
Apertura 2001	Racing Club	Primera División Argentina
2005	Tigres UANL	Interliga
