= 1908 in Argentine football =

Football in Argentina
- Season: 1908

Men's football
- Primera División: Belgrano A.C.
- Segunda División: River Plate
- Tercera División: Banfield
- Copa de Honor: Quilmes
- Copa de Competencia: Alumni

1908 in Argentine football saw Belgrano AC win its 3rd. title, ending a run of three consecutive championships for Alumni.

In International football, Argentina won Copa Newton and Copa Lipton. On 13 September 1908, in the Copa Newton game against Uruguay Argentina wore the light blue and white stripes ("Albiceleste") for the first time.

== Primera División ==
The 1908 championship was reduced from 11 to 10 teams, with each team playing the other twice.

=== Final standings ===
Pos	Team	Pts	G	W	D	L	Gf	Ga	Gd
1	Belgrano AC	31	18	15	1	2	49	20	+29
2	Alumni	27	18	13	1	4	74	18	+56
3	Argentino de Quilmes	25	18	12	1	5	44	26	+18
4	San Isidro	23	18	11	1	6	36	26	+10
5	Estudiantes (BA)	22	18	11	2	5	37	20	+17
6	Quilmes	17	18	8	1	9	46	54	-8
7	Porteño	13	18	6	1	11	23	41	-18
8	Reformer	8	18	3	2	13	10	57	-47
9	Lomas AC	7	18	3	1	14	19	50	-31
10	San Martín AC (San Martín)	3	18	2	1	15	16	42	-26

- Estudiantes (BA) was docked 2 points.
- San Martín was docked 2 points and was relegated at the end of the tournament.
- Nacional (Floresta) was disaffiliated by the Association due to the poor conditions of its stadium, according to the rules. The team had played only 2 matches.

== Lower divisions ==
=== Primera B ===
- Champion: River Plate

=== Primera C ===
- Champion: Banfield

== Domestic cups ==
=== Copa de Honor Municipalidad de Buenos Aires ===
- Champion: Quilmes

==== Final ====
Quilmes	2-1	Porteño

Quilmes

=== Copa de Competencia Jockey Club ===
Champion: Alumni

==== Final ====
2 August 1908

Alumni	5-0	Argentino de Quilmes

Belgrano AC

== International cups ==
=== Tie Cup ===
- Champion: (Argentina) Alumni

==== Final ====
6 September 1908

Alumni (Argentina)	4-0	(Uruguay) Wanderers
	Report

Belgrano AC

=== Copa de Honor Cousenier ===
- Champions: (Uruguay) Wanderers

==== Final ====
11 October 1908

Wanderers (Uruguay)	2-0	(Argentina) Quilmes
	Report

Montevideo

== Argentina national team ==
Argentina retained both Copa Lipton and Copa Newton in 1908, although the squad was later beaten by Uruguay in the inaugural Copa Premier Honor Argentino. Argentina also embarked on a tour of Brazil in August 1908 where the team won six and drew one of the seven games played in 13 days.

=== Copa Lipton ===
15 August 1908

Argentina	2-2	Uruguay
	Report

Montevideo

=== Copa Newton ===
13 September 1908

Argentina	2-1	Uruguay
	Report

Buenos Aires

=== Copa Premier Honor Argentino ===
4 October 1908

Argentina	0-1	Uruguay
	Report

Buenos Aires

=== Friendly matches ===
Date	Venue/City	Rival	Score	Report
2 July 1908	São Paulo	Foreigners of São Paulo	2-2	
5 July 1908	São Paulo	Foreigners of São Paulo	6–0	
7 July 1908	São Paulo	São Paulo State team	4–0	
9 July 1908	Rio de Janeiro	Guanabara State team	3–2	
11 July 1908	Rio de Janeiro	English of Rio de Janeiro	7–1	
12 July 1908	Rio de Janeiro	Rio de Janeiro League	3–0	
14 July 1908	Santos	São Paulo/Santos Combined	6–1	
