= Jorge Bartual =

Spanish footballer (born 1971)

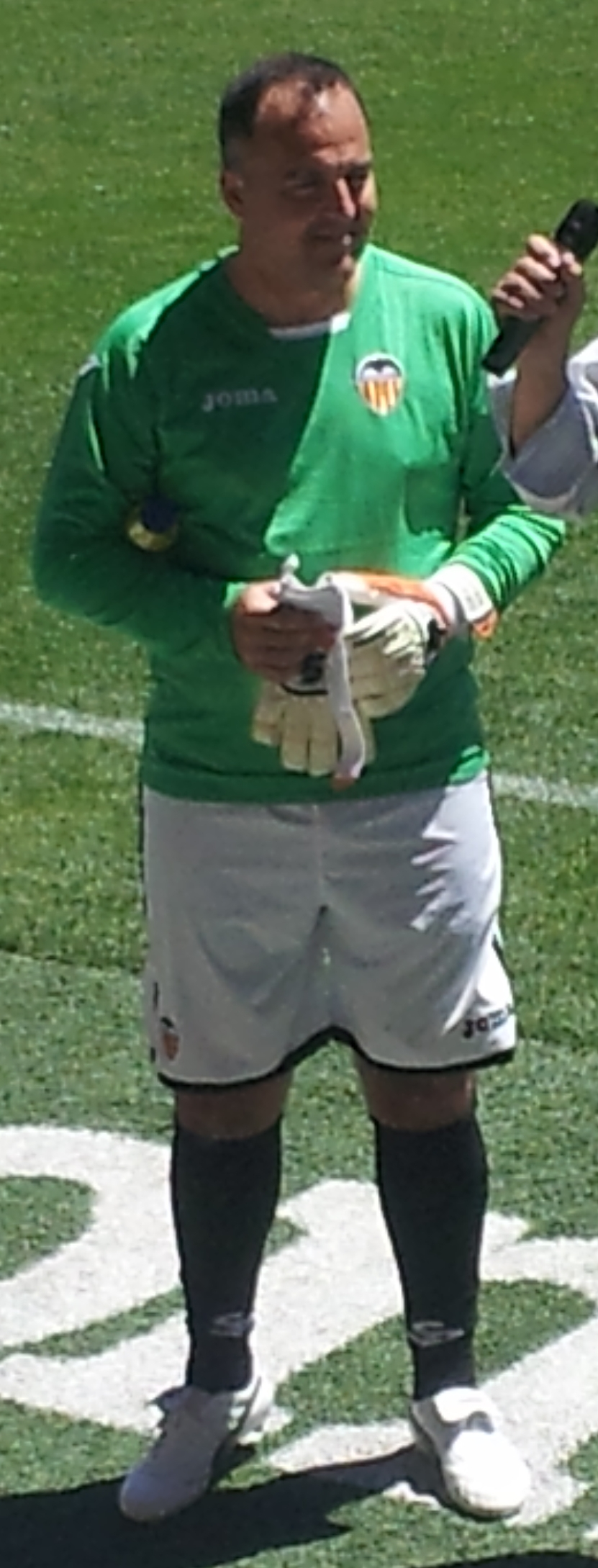
- Bartual in 2013

Personal information
- Full name: Jorge Bartual Molina
- Date of birth: 18 August 1971 (age 55)
- Place of birth: Valencia, Spain
- Height: 1.82 m (6 ft 0 in)
- Position: Goalkeeper

Youth career
- Valencia

Senior career*
Years	Team	Apps	(Gls)
1990–1995	Valencia B	30	(0)
1995–2000	Valencia	8	(0)
2001	Tenerife	0	(0)
2001–2002	Quintanar Rey		
- * Club domestic league appearances and goals

Jorge Bartual Molina (born 18 August 1971) is a Spanish retired footballer who played as a goalkeeper.

== Club career ==
Born in Valencia, Bartual spent most of his career with local Valencia, playing his first five years as a senior with the B-team, the last three in Segunda División B. He was definitely promoted to the main squad for the 1995–96 season, making his La Liga debut on 24 January 1996 in a 5–2 away win against Real Valladolid, after Andoni Zubizarreta injured himself in the warmup.

During his spell with the Che, however, Bartual never managed to be more than second or third-choice, successively being understudy to Zubizarreta, Santiago Cañizares and Andrés Palop and conceding 14 goals in his league appearances. He was on the substitutes bench for the 1999–2000 UEFA Champions League final, against Real Madrid.

In the 2001 winter transfer window, Bartual left Valencia and signed with Tenerife in Segunda División, where he failed to appear. He retired in June of the following year at not yet 31 after one season with Tercera División side Quintanar Rey, and later rejoined his main club as goalkeeper coach for the youth teams.

== Honours ==
Valencia

- Copa del Rey: 1998–99
- UEFA Champions League: Runner-up 1999–2000
- UEFA Intertoto Cup: 1998
