= 1999–2000 Atlético Madrid season =

94th season in existence of Atlético Madrid

Atlético Madrid
1999–2000 season
- President: Jesús Gil (until 21 December 1999); Luis Manuel Rubí (Official receiver) (until 12 April 2000); Jesús Gil
- Head coach: Claudio Ranieri (until 3 March); Radomir Antić (until 15 May); Fernando Zambrano (from 15 May)
- Stadium: Vicente Calderón
- La Liga: 19th (relegated to Segunda División)
- Copa del Rey: Runners-up
- UEFA Cup: Fourth round
- Top goalscorer: League: Hasselbaink (24); All: Hasselbaink (35)
Home colours	Away colours

The 1999–2000 campaign was the 94th season in Atlético Madrid's history and their 65th season in La Liga, the top division of Spanish football. It covers a period from 1 July 1999 to 30 June 2000.

== First-team squad ==
Squad at end of season

Note: Flags indicate national team as defined under FIFA eligibility rules; some limited exceptions apply. Players may hold more than one non-FIFA nationality.

No.	Pos.	Nation	Player
1	GK	ESP	José Molina
3	DF	ESP	Toni Muñoz
4	DF	PAR	Carlos Gamarra
5	DF	ESP	Juanma López
6	DF	ESP	Santi
7	MF	YUG	Veljko Paunović
8	MF	ESP	Rubén Baraja
9	MF	ARG	Santiago Solari
10	DF	PAR	Celso Ayala
11	MF	ESP	Jordi Lardín
12	MF	POR	Hugo Leal
13	GK	ESP	Toni Jiménez
14	MF	ARG	Óscar Mena
15	DF	ESP	Carlos Aguilera
16	MF	ESP	Juan Carlos Valerón

No.	Pos.	Nation	Player
17	FW	NED	Jimmy Floyd Hasselbaink
18	MF	ESP	Roberto
19	FW	ESP	Kiko
20	FW	URU	Fernando Correa
21	DF	ESP	Gustavo
22	DF	ESP	Joan Capdevila
23	DF	YUG	Zoran Njeguš
24	MF	CZE	Radek Bejbl
25	MF	URU	Leonel Pilipauskas
26	DF	ESP	Gaspar
27	DF	ESP	Juanma Delgado
28	FW	ESP	Marcos Márquez
29	FW	ESP	Pepe Domingo
30	MF	ESP	José Juan Luque

=== Transfers ===
In
Pos.	Name	from	Type
GK	Toni Jiménez	Espanyol	
DF	Celso Ayala	Betis	
DF	Joan Capdevila	Espanyol	
DF	Juanma Delgado	Recreativo	
DF	Carlos Gamarra	Corinthians	
DF	Gustavo	Atlético Madrid B	
MF	Hugo Leal	Benfica	
MF	José Juan Luque	Albacete	loan ended
MF	Veljko Paunović	Mallorca	loan ended
MF	Leonel Pilipauskas	Bella Vista	
FW	Jimmy Floyd Hasselbaink	Leeds United	
FW	Marcos Márquez	Sevilla B	

Out
Pos.	Name	To	Type
GK	Pedro Jaro		Retired
DF	Delfí Geli	Albacete	
DF	Ramón	Las Palmas	
DF	Michele Serena	Parma	
DF	Stefano Torrisi	Parma	
MF	Quinton Fortune	Manchester United	
MF	Vladimir Jugović	Internazionale	
FW	Juan González	Oviedo	loan ended
FW	Loren	Sevilla	
FW	Luis Tevenet	Las Palmas	

==== Winter ====
In
Pos.	Name	from	Type

Out
Pos.	Name	To	Type
DF	José Chamot	Milan	
FW	José Mari	Milan	
MF	Giorgio Venturin		released

== Competitions ==
=== La Liga ===
==== League table ====
Pos	Team	Pld	W	D	L	GF	GA	GD	Pts	Qualification or relegation
16	Oviedo	38	11	12	15	44	60	−16	45 (Note: ROV 1–0 NUM; NUM 1–1 ROV)	
17	Numancia	38	11	12	15	47	59	−12	45	
18	Real Betis (R)	38	11	9	18	33	56	−23	42	Relegation to the Segunda División
19	Atlético Madrid (R)	38	9	11	18	48	64	−16	38	Relegation to the Segunda División
20	Sevilla (R)	38	5	13	20	42	67	−25	28	Relegation to the Segunda División

Source: LFP
Rules for classification: 1) points; 2) head-to-head points; 3) head-to-head goal difference; 4) head-to-head goals scored; 5) goal difference; 6) number of goals scored.
(R) Relegated

==== Results by round ====
Round	1	2	3	4	5	6	7	8	9	10	11	12	13	14	15	16	17	18	19	20	21	22	23	24	25	26	27	28	29	30	31	32	33	34	35	36	37	38
Ground	H	A	H	A	H	A	H	A	H	A	A	H	A	H	A	H	A	H	A	A	H	A	H	A	H	A	H	A	H	H	A	H	A	H	A	H	A	H
Result	L	L	L	D	W	L	W	L	W	W	D	L	L	W	L	L	W	L	W	D	D	W	D	L	D	L	D	L	D	L	L	L	D	L	L	D	D	W
Position	18	20	20	19	17	20	18	20	16	10	11	16	17	15	16	17	15	17	14	14	15	13	13	15	15	17	18	18	19	19	19	19	19	19	19	19	19	19

Source: Competitive Matches
A = Away; H = Home; W = Win; D = Draw; L = Loss; = 2000-01 UEFA Champions League group stage; = 2000–01 UEFA Champions League qualifying round; = 2000-01 UEFA Cup; = 2000 UEFA Intertoto Cup; = 2000-01 Segunda Division

==== Matches ====
22 August 1999 1	Atlético Madrid	0–2	Rayo Vallecano	Madrid
		Report	40' Hernandez; 50' Ferrón	Stadium: Estadio Vicente Calderón; Attendance: 35,000; Referee: Juan Ansuátegui Roca

28 August 1999 2	Real Sociedad	2–1	Atlético Madrid	San Sebastián
	de Paula 61', 89'; Bonilla 66', 75'	Report	9' Solari	Stadium: Estadio Anoeta; Attendance: 25,000; Referee: Alfonso Pérez Burrull

12 September 1999 3	Atlético Madrid	1–2	Celta de Vigo	Madrid
	Valerón 36'	Report	31' (rig) Karpin; 86' Juanfran	Stadium: Estadio Vicente Calderón; Attendance: 45,000; Referee: José Manuel Andradas Asurmendi

19 September 1999 4	Real Zaragoza	1–1	Atlético Madrid	Zaragoza
	Milošević 18'	Report	26' Hasselbaink	Stadium: Estadio La Romareda; Attendance: 18,000; Referee: Miguel Ángel Pérez Lasa

26 September 1999 5	Atlético Madrid	2–0	Racing de Santander	Madrid
	Hasselbaink 67'; Baraja 87'	Report		Stadium: Estadio Vicente Calderón; Attendance: 35,000; Referee: Arturo Daudén Ibáñez

3 October 1999 6	RCD Espanyol	3–1	Atlético Madrid	Barcelona
	Tamudo 41'; Benítez 45'; Rotchen 68'	Report	15' Hasselbaink	Stadium: Estadio Olímpico Lluís Companys; Attendance: 27,200; Referee: Julián Rodríguez Santiago

12 October 1999 7	Atlético Madrid	1–0	Deportivo Alavés	Madrid
	Hasselbaink 76'	Report		Stadium: Estadio Vicente Calderón; Attendance: 25,000; Referee: Juan Antonio Fernández Marín

17 October 1999 8	Real Betis	2–1	Atlético Madrid	Sevilla
	Toni Prats 29'; Finidi 55'	Report	15' Solari	Stadium: Manuel Ruiz de Lopera; Attendance: 30,000; Referee: Julián Rodríguez Santiago

24 October 1999 9	Atlético Madrid	3–1	Real Valladolid	Madrid
	Capdevila 27'; Solari 69'; Hasselbaink 89'	Report	62' Víctor	Stadium: Estadio Vicente Calderón; Attendance: 25,000; Referee: Juan Manuel Brito Arceo

30 October 1999 10	Real Madrid	1–3	Atlético Madrid	Madrid
	Morientes 8'	Report	12', 38' Hasselbaink; 30' José Mari	Stadium: Santiago Bernabéu; Attendance: 75,000; Referee: Antonio López Nieto

7 November 1999 11	Atlético Madrid	2–2	CD Numancia	Madrid
	Baraja 25'; Hasselbaink 43'	Report	57' Castaño; 89' Nagore	Stadium: Estadio Vicente Calderón; Attendance: 40,000; Referee: José Luis Prados García

20 November 1999 12	Athletic Bilbao	4–2	Atlético Madrid	Bilbao
	J. Etxeberria 14'; J. Guerrero 21'; C. García 47'; Ezquerro 57' (rig)	Report	28' (rig) Hasselbaink; 75' Paunović	Stadium: San Mamés; Attendance: 30,000; Referee: Fernando Carmona Méndez

28 November 1999 13	Atlético Madrid	1–3	Deportivo La Coruña	Madrid
	Baraja 55'	Report	23', 26' Makaay; 43' Víctor	Stadium: Estadio Vicente Calderón; Attendance: 40,000; Referee: José Ignacio Bueno Grimal

5 December 1999 14	Málaga CF	2–3	Atlético Madrid	Málaga
	Luque 21', 61'	Report	5', 42' Hasselbaink; 49' José Mari	Stadium: La Rosaleda; Attendance: 35,000; Referee: Antoni Llonch Andreu

12 December 1999 15	Atlético Madrid	1–2	Valencia CF	Madrid
	Hasselbaink 28'	Report	16' Mendieta; 53' J. Sánchez	Stadium: Estadio Vicente Calderón; Attendance: 30,000; Referee: José Ignacio Bueno Grimal

19 December 1999 16	FC Barcelona	2–1	Atlético Madrid	Barcelona
	Luis Enrique 34'; Zenden 85'	Report	43' (rig) Hasselbaink	Stadium: Camp Nou; Attendance: 60,000; Referee: Luis Medina Cantalejo

22 December 1999 17	Atlético Madrid	5–0	Real Oviedo	Madrid
	Valerón 2'; Ayala 9'; Hasselbaink 43', 69'; Correa 61'	Report		Stadium: Estadio Vicente Calderón; Attendance: 20,000; Referee: Eduardo Iturralde González

5 January 2000 18	Sevilla CF	2–1	Atlético Madrid	Sevilla
	Juan Carlos 24'; Zalayeta 34'	Report	72' Hasselbaink	Stadium: Ramón Sánchez-Pizjuán; Attendance: 22,000; Referee: Manuel Enrique Mejuto González

9 January 2000 19	Atlético Madrid	1–0	RCD Mallorca	Madrid
	Hasselbaink 47' (rig)	Report		Stadium: Estadio Vicente Calderón; Attendance: 22,000; Referee: Manuel Enrique Mejuto González

15 January 2000 20	Rayo Vallecano	1–1	Atlético Madrid	Madrid
	Llorens 31' (rig)	Report	27' Aguilera	Stadium: Teresa Riviero; Attendance: 9,000; Referee: José Javier Losantos Omar

23 January 2000 21	Atlético Madrid	1–1	Real Sociedad	Madrid
	Hasselbaink 17'	Report	61' Jankauskas	Stadium: Estadio Vicente Calderón; Attendance: 30,000; Referee: Manuel Díaz Vega

29 January 2000 22	Celta de Vigo	0–1	Atlético Madrid	Vigo
		Report	26' Valerón	Stadium: Balaídos; Attendance: 20,000; Referee: Alfonso Pérez Burrull

6 February 2000 23	Atlético Madrid	2–2	Real Zaragoza	Madrid
	Hasselbaink 19' (rig), 54'	Report	80' Yordi; 82' Garitano	Stadium: Estadio Vicente Calderón; Attendance: 35,000; Referee: Juan Antonio Fernández Marín

13 February 2000 24	Racing de Santander	2–1	Atlético Madrid	Santander
	V. Dorado 36', 51'	Report	6' Roberto F.	Stadium: El Sardinero; Attendance: 14,000; Referee: Javier Turienzo Álvarez

20 February 2000 25	Atlético Madrid	1–1	RCD Espanyol	Madrid
	Hasselbaink 40'	Report	53' Tamudo	Stadium: Estadio Vicente Calderón; Attendance: 30,000; Referee: José Luis Prados García

27 February 2000 26	Deportivo Alavés	2–0	Atlético Madrid	Vitoria-Gasteiz
	Magno 81'; Bejbl 85' (aut)	Report		Stadium: Mendizorrotza; Attendance: 17,000; Referee: Luis Medina Cantalejo

5 March 2000 27	Atlético Madrid	0–0	Real Betis	Madrid
		Report		Stadium: Estadio Vicente Calderón; Attendance: 40,000; Referee: José Ignacio Bueno Grimal

27 February 2000 28	Real Valladolid	1–0	Atlético Madrid	Valladolid
	Javi Jiménez 25'	Report		Stadium: José Zorrilla; Attendance: 14,000; Referee: Manuel Enrique Mejuto González

18 March 2000 29	Atlético Madrid	1–1	Real Madrid	Madrid
	Solari 44'	Report	33' Morientes	Stadium: Estadio Vicente Calderón; Attendance: 54,800; Referee: Antonio López Nieto

25 March 2000 30	CD Numancia	3–0	Atlético Madrid	Soria
	Delgado 10', 55'; Barbu 83'	Report		Stadium: Los Pajaritos; Attendance: 9,500; Referee: José Japón Sevilla

2 April 2000 31	Atlético Madrid	1–2	Athletic Bilbao	Madrid
	Hasselbaink 36'	Report	30' Etxeberria; 30' Guerrero	Stadium: Estadio Vicente Calderón; Attendance: 40,000; Referee: Juan Ansuátegui Roca

8 April 2000 32	Deportivo La Coruña	4–1	Atlético Madrid	La Coruña
	Turu Flores 19'; Makaay 40', 43', 85'	Report	53' Hasselbaink	Stadium: Riazor; Attendance: 30,000; Referee: José Manuel Andradas Asurmendi

15 April 2000 33	Atlético Madrid	2–2	Málaga CF	Madrid
	Valerón 4'; Solari 80'	Report	35' Rufete; 50' Catanha	Stadium: Estadio Vicente Calderón; Attendance: 45,000; Referee: Alfonso Pérez Burrull

22 April 2000 34	Valencia CF	2–0	Atlético Madrid	Valencia
	Claudio López 23'; Angulo 89'	Report		Stadium: Mestalla; Attendance: 40,000; Referee: Antoni Llonch Andreu

29 April 2000 35	Atlético Madrid	0–3	FC Barcelona	Madrid
		Report	40' Sergi; 63' Dani; 89' Gabri	Stadium: Estadio Vicente Calderón; Attendance: 54,000; Referee: José Javier Losantos Omar

7 May 2000 36	Real Oviedo	2–2	Atlético Madrid	Oviedo
	Losada 25'; Paulo Bento 63' (rig)	Report	72' Capdevilla; 77' Hasselbaink	Stadium: Carlos Tartiere; Attendance: 14,200; Referee: José Luis Prados García

13 May 2000 37	Atlético Madrid	1–1	Sevilla CF	Madrid
	Hugo Leal 32'	Report	44' Tsiartas	Stadium: Estadio Vicente Calderón; Attendance: 10,000; Referee: Arturo Daudén Ibáñez

19 May 2000 38	RCD Mallorca	1–2	Atlético Madrid	Palma de Mallorca
	Eto'o 14'	Report	5' Paunović; 31' Solari	Stadium: Son Moix; Attendance: 10,000; Referee: Antoni Llonch Andreu

=== Copa del Rey ===
Third round

15 December 1999	UD Las Palmas	2–2	Atlético Madrid	Las Palmas de Gran Canaria
	P. Lago 3'; Tevenet 78'	Report	7' Hasselbaink; 47' José Mari	Stadium: Estadio Insular; Attendance: 13,300; Referee: Juan Fernández Marín

12 January 2000	Atlético Madrid	1–0	UD Las Palmas	Madrid
	Roberto F. 88'	Report		Stadium: Vicente Calderón; Attendance: 7,000; Referee: Arturo Daudén Ibáñez

Eightfinals

19 January 2000	Real Unión	0–3	Atlético Madrid	Irún
		Report	21' Roberto F. 55' Paunović; 60' Njegus	Stadium: Gal; Attendance: 4,000; Referee: José Andradas Asurmendi

2 February 2000	Atlético Madrid	2–0	Real Unión	Madrid
	Njegus 9'; Marcos 70'	Report		Stadium: Vicente Calderón; Attendance: 3,000; Referee: Fernando Carmona Méndez

Quarterfinals

9 February 2000	Atlético Madrid	0–0	Rayo Vallecano	Madrid
		Report		Stadium: Vicente Calderón; Attendance: 20,000; Referee: Antonio López Nieto

16 February 2000	Rayo Vallecano	2–2	Atlético Madrid	Madrid
	Míchel 27', 51'	Report	3' Hasselbaink; 88' Baraja	Stadium: Teresa Rivero; Attendance: 11,000; Referee: Manuel Díaz Vega

Semifinals

12 April 2000	Atlético Madrid	3–0	FC Barcelona	Madrid
	Hasselbaink 29'; Baraja 47'; Hugo Leal 53'	Report		Stadium: Vicente Calderón; Attendance: 54,000; Referee: Fernando Carmona Méndez

26 April 2000	FC Barcelona		Atlético Madrid	Barcelona
		Report		Stadium: Camp Nou

==== Final ====
27 May 2000	RCD Espanyol	2–1	Atlético Madrid	Valencia
21:00 CEST	Tamudo 2'; Sergio 85'	Report	90' Hasselbaink	Stadium: Mestalla; Attendance: 53,000; Referee: Antonio López Nieto

=== UEFA Cup ===
First round

16 September 1999	Atlético Madrid	3–0	(Turkey) Ankaragucu	Madrid
21:30 CEST	Gamarra 43'; Hasselbaink 45'; Paunović 58'	Report		Stadium: Vicente Calderón; Attendance: 19,000; Referee: (Germany) Georg Dardenne

30 September 1999	(Turkey) Ankaragucu	1–0	Atlético Madrid	Ankara
18:30 CEST	Aksancak 85'	Report		Stadium: 19 Mayis; Attendance: 5,000; Referee: (Denmark) Claus Bo Larsen

Second round

21 October 1999	Atlético Madrid	1–0	(Poland) Amica Wronki	Madrid
21:30 CEST	Baraja 79'	Report		Stadium: Vicente Calderón; Attendance: 8,000; Referee: (Austria) Konrad Plaut

4 November 1999	(Poland) Amica Wronki	1–4	Atlético Madrid	Wronki
19:55 CET	Jackiewicz 34'	Report	31' Hasselbaink; 45' Capdevilla; 52' Baraja; 84' Correa	Stadium: Stadion Amica; Attendance: 6,000; Referee: (Hungary) Sándor Puhl

Third round

23 November 1999	(Germany) Wolfsburg	2–3	Atlético Madrid	Wolfsburg
18:00 CET	Juskowiak 21'; Akonnor 83' (rig)	Report	6', 58' Aguilera; 37' Hasselbaink	Stadium: VfL-Stadion; Attendance: 10,700; Referee: (Belgium) Luc Huyghe

9 December 1999	Atlético Madrid	2–1	(Germany) Wolfsburg	Madrid
21:45 CET	Hasselbaink 4'; Correa 86'	Report	56' (pen.) Akonnor	Stadium: Vicente Calderón; Attendance: 5,000; Referee: (Northern Ireland) Leslie Irvine

==== Quarter-finals ====
2 March 2000	Atlético Madrid	2–2	(France) RC Lens	Madrid
20:15 CET	Hasselbaink 24', 79'	Report	15', 78' Dacourt	Stadium: Vicente Calderón; Attendance: 15,000; Referee: (Greece) Kyros Vassaras

9 March 2000	(France) RC Lens	4–2	Atlético Madrid	Lens
21:00 CET	Nouma 29', 37', 53'; Brunel 72'	Report	45' Hasselbaink; 65' Kiko	Stadium: Bollaert-Delelis; Attendance: 37,229; Referee: (Russia) Nikolay Levnikov

== Statistics ==
=== Players statistics ===
No.	Pos	Nat	Player	Total		La Liga		Copa del Rey		UEFA Cup	
No.	Pos	Nat	Player	Apps	Goals	Apps	Goals	Apps	Goals	Apps	Goals
1	GK	(Spain) ESP	Molina	40	-64	31	-51	1	-2	8	-11
15	DF	(Spain) ESP	Carlos Aguilera	40	3	25+4	1	4	0	5+2	2
26	DF	(Spain) ESP	Gaspar	34	0	25+2	0	3	0	4	0
4	DF	(Paraguay) PAR	Gamarra	43	1	32	0	5	0	6	1
6	DF	(Spain) ESP	Santi	40	0	25+3	0	6+1	0	4+1	0
22	DF	(Spain) ESP	Capdevila	40	3	31	2	4	0	5	1
16	MF	(Spain) ESP	Valerón	47	6	26+9	4	5+1	0	4+2	2
8	MF	(Spain) ESP	Baraja	37	7	17+9	3	3+2	2	4+2	2
24	MF	(Czech Republic) CZE	Bejbl	42	0	28+3	0	3	0	8	0
9	MF	(Argentina) ARG	Solari	45	6	28+6	6	3+1	0	6+1	0
17	FW	(Netherlands) NED	Hasselbaink	47	35	34	24	6	4	7	7
13	GK	(Spain) ESP	Toni	14	-17	7	-13	7	-4	0	0
19	FW	(Spain) ESP	Kiko	27	1	17+3	0	3+2	0	1+1	1
12	MF	(Portugal) POR	Hugo Leal	34	2	16+7	1	5+1	1	2+3	0
2	DF	(Argentina) ARG	Chamot	17	0	12	0	0	0	4+1	0
14	FW	(Spain) ESP	Jose Mari	16	3	11+1	2	1	1	3	0
10	DF	(Paraguay) PAR	Ayala	15	1	9	1	4	0	2	0
20	FW	(Uruguay) URU	Correa	31	3	8+12	1	3+1	0	4+3	2
7	MF	(Federal Republic of Yugoslavia) YUG	Paunovic	24	4	6+11	2	3+1	1	1+2	1
3	DF	(Spain) ESP	Toni Muñoz	13	0	5+2	0	3	0	2+1	0
23	DF	(Federal Republic of Yugoslavia) YUG	Njegus	16	2	4+7	0	4	2	1	0
23	MF	(Italy) ITA	Venturin	6	0	4+2	0	0	0	0	0
21	DF	(Spain) ESP	Gustavo	10	0	4	0	3	0	3	0
25	MF	(Uruguay) URU	Pilipauskas	10	0	4	0	3+1	0	1+1	0
18	MF	(Spain) ESP	Roberto	22	3	3+12	1	2+2	2	2+1	0
11	MF	(Spain) ESP	Jordi Lardín	10	0	2+5	0	1+1	0	1	0
30	MF	(Spain) ESP	Luque	8	0	2+4	0	1+1	0	0	0
14	MF	(Argentina) ARG	Oscar Mena	8	0	2+4	0	1+1	0	0	0
5	DF	(Spain) ESP	Juanma López	5	0	2	0	1+2	0	0	0
27	DF	(Spain) ESP	Juanma Delgado	1	0	0	0	0+1	0	0	0
28	FW	(Spain) ESP	Marquez	1	1	0	0	0+1	1	0	0
29	FW	(Spain) ESP	Domingo	1	0	0	0	0+1	0	0	0
5	MF	(Uruguay) URU	Pablo García	2	0	0	0	0	0	0+2	0
