= 1998–99 Atlético Madrid season =

93rd season in existence of Atlético Madrid

Atlético Madrid
1998–99 season
- President: Jesús Gil
- Head coach: Arrigo Sacchi (until 14 February); Carlos Sánchez Aguiar (from 15 February to 23 March); Radomir Antić
- La Liga: 13th
- Copa del Rey: Runners-up
- UEFA Cup: Semi-final
Home colours	Away colours

The 1998–1999 campaign was the 93rd season in Atlético Madrid's history and their 64th season in La Liga, the top division of Spanish football.

== Season summary ==
Arrigo Sacchi was sacked in February with Atlético in the UEFA Cup quarter-finals but also mired in the bottom half of the table. B-team manager Carlos Sánchez Aguiar took charge for the next month, guiding Atlético to the UEFA Cup semi-finals, before handing the reins to Radomir Antić. Antić had guided the club to the title three years previously, but ultimately the high point of his second spell in charge would be reaching the Copa del Rey final, only to be thrashed 3–0 by Valencia. The league form under Antić continued to be mediocre and Atlético were also knocked out of the UEFA Cup in the semi-finals for the second season running, by eventual champions Parma. Although Atlético qualified for the UEFA Cup due to their domestic cup run, this season would prove to be the beginning of the end for Atlético's status as one of Spain's top clubs for most of the next decade; it would be five more years until Atlético recorded their next top-half finish, and another three before their return to European competition.

== First-team squad ==
Squad at end of season

Note: Flags indicate national team as defined under FIFA eligibility rules; some limited exceptions apply. Players may hold more than one non-FIFA nationality.

No.	Pos.	Nation	Player
1	GK	ESP	José Molina
2	DF	ARG	José Chamot
3	DF	ESP	Toni
4	DF	YUG	Zoran Njegus
5	DF	ESP	Juanma López
6	DF	ESP	Santi
7	MF	YUG	Vladimir Jugović
8	MF	ITA	Giorgio Venturin
9	MF	ARG	Santiago Solari
10	MF	BRA	Juninho
11	MF	ESP	Jordi Lardín
12	MF	RSA	Quinton Fortune
13	GK	ESP	Pedro Luis Jaro
14	FW	ESP	José Mari
15	DF	ESP	Carlos Aguilera

No.	Pos.	Nation	Player
16	MF	ESP	Juan Carlos Valerón
17	FW	URU	Juan González
18	MF	ESP	Roberto
19	FW	ESP	Kiko
20	DF	ESP	Delfí Geli
21	DF	ITA	Stefano Torrisi
22	MF	ARG	Óscar Mena
23	DF	ITA	Michele Serena
24	MF	CZE	Radek Bejbl
25	FW	URU	Fernando Correa
27	DF	ESP	Ramón
28	FW	ESP	Luis Tevenet
29	MF	ESP	Rubén Baraja
30	DF	ESP	Gaspar
31	FW	ESP	Loren

=== Transfers ===
In
Pos.	Name	from	Type
DF	José Chamot	SS Lazio	
MF	Vladimir Jugović	SS Lazio	
DF	Michele Serena	Fiorentina	
DF	Stefano Torrisi	Bologna FC	
DF	Zoran Njegus	Crvena Zvezda	
MF	Juan Carlos Valerón	RCD Mallorca	
MF	Oscar Mena	RCD Mallorca	
MF	Roberto	RCD Espanyol	loan ended
MF	Cristian Díaz	Platense	
MF	Santiago Solari	River Plate	
FW	Fernando Correa	Racing Santander	loan ended
FW	Luis Tevenet	Sevilla FC	
MF	Rubén Baraja	Real Valladolid	
DF	Gaspar Gálvez Burgos		
MF	Loren del Pino		

Out
Pos.	Name	To	Type
FW	Christian Vieri	SS Lazio	
MF	José Luis Caminero	Real Valladolid	
DF	Andrei Frascarelli	Real Betis	
FW	Paulo Futre		retired
MF	Juan Vizcaíno	Real Valladolid	
MF	Milinko Pantic	Le Havre AC	
MF	Veljko Paunovic	RCD Mallorca	loan
DF	Daniel Prodan	Glasgow Rangers	

==== Winter ====
In
Pos.	Name	from	Type
MF	Giorgio Venturin	SS Lazio	
FW	Juan Gonzalez	Real Oviedo	loan

Out
Pos.	Name	To	Type
MF	Cristian Díaz	Málaga	loan

== Competitions ==
=== La Liga ===
==== League table ====
Pos	Team	Pld	W	D	L	GF	GA	GD	Pts	Qualification or relegation
11	Real Betis	38	14	7	17	47	58	−11	49	
12	Valladolid	38	13	9	16	35	44	−9	48	
13	Atlético Madrid	38	12	10	16	54	50	+4	46	Qualification for the UEFA Cup first round (Note: Since Valencia, winners of 1998–99 Copa del Rey, was qualified for the 1999–2000 UEFA Champions League, losing cup finalists Atlético Madrid earned a spot in the first round of the 1999–2000 UEFA Cup.)
14	Oviedo	38	11	12	15	41	57	−16	45	
15	Racing Santander	38	10	12	16	41	53	−12	42	

Source: LFP
Rules for classification: 1) points; 2) head-to-head points; 3) head-to-head goal difference; 4) head-to-head goals scored; 5) goal difference; 6) number of goals scored.

==== Results by round ====
Round	1	2	3	4	5	6	7	8	9	10	11	12	13	14	15	16	17	18	19	20	21	22	23	24	25	26	27	28	29	30	31	32	33	34	35	36	37	38
Ground	A	H	A	H	A	H	A	H	A	H	A	H	A	H	A	H	H	A	H	H	A	H	A	H	A	H	A	H	A	H	A	H	A	H	A	A	H	A
Result	L	W	D	W	L	W	L	W	D	L	W	W	D	D	D	W	W	L	W	L	L	L	L	D	L	L	L	D	D	L	D	W	L	L	D	L	W	W
Position	18	7	7	4	6	4	9	5	7	10	6	4	6	6	7	5	3	6	4	8	8	9	11	12	12	12	13	14	14	14	14	13	14	15	15	15	14	13

Source: https://www.worldfootball.net/competition/ro11027/md38/results-and-standings/
A = Away; H = Home; W = Win; D = Draw; L = Loss; = Leader, 1999–2000 UEFA Champions League group stage; = 1999–2000 UEFA Champions League group stage; = 1999–2000 UEFA Champions League qualifying round; = 1999–2000 UEFA Cup; = 1999 UEFA Intertoto Cup; = 1999–2000 Segunda División

==== Matches ====
28 August 1998 1	Valencia CF	1–0	Atlético de Madrid	Valencia
		Report		Stadium: Estadio Mestalla

11 September 1998 2	Atlético de Madrid	2–0	UD Salamanca	Madrid
		Report		Stadium: Estadio Vicente Calderón

September 1998 3	RCD Espanyol	1–1	Atlético de Madrid	Barcelona
		Report		Stadium: Olímpic Lluís Companys

25 September 1998 4	Atlético de Madrid	4–1	Real Sociedad	Madrid
		Report		Stadium: Estadio Vicente Calderón

3 October 1998 5	Real Oviedo	3–1	Atlético de Madrid	Oviedo
		Report		Stadium: Estadio Carlos Tartiere

16 October 1998 6	Atlético de Madrid	2–0	CD Tenerife	Madrid
		Report		Stadium: Estadio Vicente Calderón

24 October 1998 7	RCD Mallorca	4–0	Atlético de Madrid	Mallorca
		Report		Stadium: Estadio Lluis Sitjar

30 October 1998 8	Atlético de Madrid	3–0	CD Alaves	Madrid
		Report		Stadium: Estadio Vicente Calderón

7 November 1998 9	Atlético de Madrid	1–1	Deportivo La Coruña	Madrid
		Report		Stadium: Estadio Vicente Calderón

14 November 1998 10	Villarreal CF	2–1	Atlético de Madrid	Villarreal
		Report		Stadium: Estadio de la Ceramica

20 November 1998 11	Atlético de Madrid	6–1	Real Valladolid	Madrid
		Report		Stadium: Estadio Vicente Calderón

27 November 1998 12	FC Barcelona	0–1	Atlético de Madrid	Barcelona
		Report		Stadium: Camp Nou

4 December 1998 13	Atlético de Madrid	0–0	Athletic de Bilbao	Madrid
		Report		Stadium: Estadio Vicente Calderón

11 December 1998 14	Real Betis	0–0	Atlético de Madrid	Sevilla
		Report		Stadium: Estadio Benito Villamarin

19 December 1998 15	Atlético de Madrid	0–0	Real Zaragoza	Madrid
		Report		Stadium: Estadio Vicente Calderón

2 January 1999 16	Racing de Santander	2–3	Atlético de Madrid	Santander
		Report		Stadium: Estadio El Sardinero

9 January 1999 17	Atlético de Madrid	5–0	CF Extremadura	Madrid
		Report		Stadium: Estadio Vicente Calderón

16 January 1999 18	Real Madrid	4–2	Atlético de Madrid	Madrid
		Report		Stadium: Estadio Santiago Bernabéu

23 January 1999 19	Atlético de Madrid	2–1	Celta de Vigo	Madrid
		Report		Stadium: Estadio Vicente Calderón

29 January 1999 20	Atlético de Madrid	1–2	Valencia CF	Madrid
		Report		Stadium: Estadio Vicente Calderón

6 February 1999 21	UD Salamanca	2–1	Atlético de Madrid	Villares de la Reina
		Report		Stadium: Estadio Helmántico

12 February 1999 22	Atlético de Madrid	1–2	RCD Espanyol	Madrid
		Report		Stadium: Estadio Vicente Calderón

20 February 1999 23	Real Sociedad	3–2	Atlético de Madrid	San Sebastián
		Report		Stadium: Estadio Anoeta

26 February 1999 24	Atlético de Madrid	0–0	Real Oviedo	Madrid
		Report		Stadium: Estadio Vicente Calderón

6 March 1999 25	CD Tenerife	1–0	Atlético de Madrid	Santa Cruz de Tenerife
		Report		Stadium: Estadio Heliodoro Rodriguez

12 March 1999 26	Atlético de Madrid	1–2	RCD Mallorca	Madrid
		Report		Stadium: Estadio Vicente Calderón

20 March 1999 27	CD Alaves	2–0	Atlético de Madrid	Vitoria
		Report		Stadium: Mendizorroza

2 April 1999 28	Deportivo La Coruña	1–1	Atlético de Madrid	La Coruña
		Report		Stadium: Estadio Riazor

10 April 1999 29	Atlético de Madrid	2–2	Villarreal CF	Madrid
		Report		Stadium: Estadio Vicente Calderón

16 April 1999 30	Real Valladolid	1–0	Atlético de Madrid	Valladolid
		Report		Stadium: Estadio Jose Zorrilla

24 April 1999 31	Atlético de Madrid	1–1	FC Barcelona	Madrid
		Report		Stadium: Estadio Vicente Calderón

1 May 1999 32	Athletic de Bilbao	1–2	Atlético de Madrid	Bilbao
		Report		Stadium: Estadio San Mames

8 May 1999 33	Atlético de Madrid	2–3	Real Betis	Madrid
		Report		Stadium: Estadio Vicente Calderón

15 May 1999 34	Real Zaragoza	2–0	Atlético de Madrid	Zaragoza
		Report		Stadium: Estadio La Romareda

22 May 1999 35	Atlético de Madrid	1–1	Racing de Santander	Madrid
		Report		Stadium: Estadio Vicente Calderón

29 May 1999 36	CF Extremadura	2–1	Atlético de Madrid	Almendralejo
		Report		Stadium: Francisco de la Hera

11 June 1999 37	Atlético de Madrid	3–1	Real Madrid	Madrid
		Report		Stadium: Estadio Vicente Calderón

19 June 1999 38	Celta de Vigo	0–1	Atlético de Madrid	Vigo
		Report		Stadium: Estadio Balaídos

=== Copa del Rey ===
Eightfinals

19 January 1999	Real Sociedad	1–2	Atlético de Madrid	San Sebastián
		Report		Stadium: Estadio Anoeta

1 February 1999	Atlético de Madrid	0–1	Real Sociedad	Madrid
		Report		Stadium: Estadio Vicente Calderón

Quarterfinals

16 February 1999	Atlético de Madrid	2–1	RCD Espanyol	Madrid
		Report		Stadium: Estadio Vicente Calderón

23 February 1999	RCD Espanyol	1–4	Atlético de Madrid	Barcelona
		Report		Stadium: Estadi Olímpic Lluís Companys

Semifinals

7 June 1999	Atlético de Madrid	0–0	Deportivo La Coruña	Madrid
				Stadium: Estadio Vicente Calderón

14 June 1999	Deportivo La Coruña	0–1	Atlético de Madrid	La Coruña
		Report		Stadium: Estadio Riazor

==== Final ====
26 June 1999	Atlético Madrid	0–3	Valencia	Sevilla
21:30 CEST		Copa del Rey 1999	López 22', 81'; Mendieta 33'	Stadium: La Cartuja; Attendance: 45,000; Referee: Manuel Díaz Vega

=== UEFA Cup ===
==== First round ====
15 September 1998	Atlético Madrid (Spain)	2–0	(Federal Republic of Yugoslavia) Obilić	Madrid
21:30 (CET)	Juninho 15'; José Mari 53'	Report		Stadium: Vicente Calderón Stadium; Attendance: 20,000; Referee: (Germany) Edgar Steinborn

29 September 1998	Obilić (Federal Republic of Yugoslavia)	0–1	(Spain) Atlético Madrid	Belgrade
20:30 (CET)		Report	Kiko 55'	Stadium: Partizan Stadium; Attendance: 10,000; Referee: (Netherlands) Jan Wegereef

Atlético Madrid won 3–0 on aggregate.

==== Second round ====
20 October 1998	CSKA Sofia (Bulgaria)	2–4	(Spain) Atlético Madrid	Sofia
19:15 (CET)	Genchev 53'; Naydenov 88'	Report	Torrisi 41'; Kiko 43', 87'; Roberto 75'	Stadium: Balgarska Armia Stadium; Attendance: 22,000; Referee: (Germany) Georg Dardenne

3 November 1998	Atlético Madrid (Spain)	1–0	(Bulgaria) CSKA Sofia	Madrid
21:30 (CET)	Juninho 45' (pen.)	Report		Stadium: Vicente Calderón; Attendance: 28,000; Referee: (Belgium) Luc Huyghe

Atlético Madrid won 5–2 on aggregate.

==== Third round ====
24 November 1998	Real Sociedad (Spain)	2–1	(Spain) Atlético Madrid	San Sebastián
19:45 (CET)	Kovačević 45'; Roberto 85' (o.g.)	Report	Juninho 3'	Stadium: Anoeta; Attendance: 24,431; Referee: (England) Graham Poll

8 December 1998	Atlético Madrid (Spain)	4–1 (a.e.t.)	(Spain) Real Sociedad	Madrid
21:30 (CET)	Jugović 16', 45' (pen.); Santi 96'; José Mari 98'	Report	Gracia 51'	Stadium: Vicente Calderón Stadium; Attendance: 37,000; Referee: (Portugal) Vítor Melo Pereira

Atlético Madrid won 5–3 on aggregate.

==== Quarter-finals ====
2 March 1999	Atlético Madrid (Spain)	2–1	(Italy) Roma	Madrid
21:30 (CET)	José Mari 13'; Roberto 46'	Report	Di Biagio 75'	Stadium: Vicente Calderón Stadium; Attendance: 40,000; Referee: (France) Alain Sars

16 March 1999	Roma (Italy)	1–2	(Spain) Atlético Madrid	Roma
21:30 (CET)	Delvecchio 32'	Report	Aguilera 58'; Roberto 89'	Stadium: Stadio Olimpico; Attendance: 64,485; Referee: (Netherlands) Mario van der Ende

Atlético Madrid won 4–2 on aggregate.

==== Semi-finals ====
6 April 1999	Atlético Madrid (Spain)	1–3	(Italy) Parma	Madrid
21:30 (CET)	Juninho 21' (pen.)	Report	Chiesa 13', 40'; Crespo 62'	Stadium: Vicente Calderón Stadium; Attendance: 57,000; Referee: (Russia) Nikolai Levnikov

20 April 1999	Parma (Italy)	2–1	(Spain) Atlético Madrid	Parma
21:30 (CET)	Balbo 35'; Chiesa 83'	Report	Roberto 63'	Stadium: Stadio Ennio Tardini; Attendance: 9,872; Referee: (England) Paul Durkin

Parma won 5–2 on aggregate.

== Statistics ==
=== Players statistics ===
No.	Pos	Nat	Player	Total		La Liga		Copa del Rey		UEFA Cup	
No.	Pos	Nat	Player	Apps	Goals	Apps	Goals	Apps	Goals	Apps	Goals
1	GK	(Spain) ESP	Molina	53	-66	38	-49	7	-7	8	-10
15	DF	(Spain) ESP	Carlos Aguilera	42	2	27+1	1	7	0	5+2	1
2	DF	(Argentina) ARG	Chamot	47	1	33	1	5	0	9	0
6	DF	(Spain) ESP	Santi	44	1	29+1	0	5+1	0	8	1
23	DF	(Italy) ITA	Serena	51	4	35	3	6	1	9+1	0
16	MF	(Spain) ESP	Valeron	40	3	26+4	3	4+1	0	5	0
18	MF	(Spain) ESP	Roberto	46	9	19+11	4	2+4	1	7+3	4
22	MF	(Argentina) ARG	Óscar Mena	40	2	19+10	2	2+2	0	6+1	0
10	MF	(Brazil) BRA	Juninho	47	13	20+12	8	5+1	1	9	4
14	FW	(Spain) ESP	José Mari	51	16	33+4	9	7	4	6+1	3
11	FW	(Spain) ESP	Jordi Lardín	33	2	18+3	2	4+2	0	5+1	0
13	GK	(Spain) ESP	Jaro	5	-3	0+2	-1	0	0	2+1	-2
3	DF	(Spain) ESP	Toni	33	0	16+6	0	1+2	0	6+2	0
7	MF	(Federal Republic of Yugoslavia) YUG	Jugovic	27	5	15+2	3	2	0	8	2
21	DF	(Italy) ITA	Torrisi	27	2	15+2	1	5	0	4+1	1
25	FW	(Uruguay) URU	Correa	26	10	11+9	8	1+2	2	0+3	0
24	MF	(Czech Republic) CZE	Bejbl	21	0	10+4	0	3	0	1+3	0
19	FW	(Spain) ESP	Kiko	15	7	10+1	4	0	0	4	3
4	DF	(Federal Republic of Yugoslavia) YUG	Njegus	22	1	8+7	1	1	0	3+3	0
8	MF	(Italy) ITA	Venturin	13	0	7+4	0	1+1	0	0	0
17	FW	(Uruguay) URU	Juan González	9	2	7+1	2	1	0	0	0
28	MF	(Spain) ESP	Baraja	14	1	7+1	1	3+1	0	2	0
9	MF	(Argentina) ARG	Solari	16	1	5+7	1	0+3	0	1	0
20	DF	(Spain) ESP	Delfí Geli	11	0	4+2	0	3	0	1+1	0
27	DF	(Spain) ESP	Ramón	11	0	3+3	0	2	0	0+3	0
12	MF	(South Africa) RSA	Fortune	2	0	2	0	0	0	0	0
31	FW	(Spain) ESP	Loren	2	0	1+1	0	0	0	0	0
29	MF	(Spain) ESP	Tevenet	7	0	0+5	0	0	0	1+1	0
30	DF	(Spain) ESP	Gaspar	2	0	0+2	0	0	0	0	0
5	DF	(Spain) ESP	Juanma López	0	0	0	0	0	0	0	0
26	FW	(Spain) ESP	Rubio	0	0	0	0	0	0	0	0
17	DF	(Argentina) ARG	Cristian Díaz	0	0	0	0	0	0	0	0

- Source: https://www.bdfutbol.com/es/t/t1998-997.html

=== Top scorers ===
Rank	Position	Number	Player	La Liga	Copa del Rey	UEFA Cup	Total
1	FW	14	(Spain) José Mari	9	4	3	16
2	MF	10	(Brazil) Juninho Paulista	8	1	4	13
3	FW	25	(Uruguay) Fernando Correa	8	2	0	10
4	MF	18	(Spain) Roberto Fresnedoso	4	1	4	9
5	FW	19	(Spain) Kiko	4	0	3	7
6	MF	7	(Federal Republic of Yugoslavia) Vladimir Jugović	3	0	2	5
7	DF	23	(Italy) Michele Serena	3	1	0	4
8	MF	16	(Spain) Juan Carlos Valerón	3	0	0	3
9	FW	11	(Spain) Jordi Lardín	2	0	0	0
9	DF	15	(Spain) Aguilera	1	0	1	2
9	FW	17	(Uruguay) Juan González	2	0	0	2
9	DF	21	(Italy) Stefano Torrisi	1	0	1	2
9	MF	22	(Argentina) Oscar Mena	2	0	0	2
14	DF	2	(Argentina) José Chamot	1	0	0	1
14	DF	4	(Federal Republic of Yugoslavia) Zoran Njeguš	1	0	0	1
14	DF	6	(Spain) Santi Denia	0	0	1	1
14	MF	9	(Argentina) Santiago Solari	1	0	0	1
14	MF	28	(Spain) Rubén Baraja	1	0	0	1
Own goals				0	0	0	0
Totals				54	9	19	82
