= 1993–94 Real Madrid CF season =

92nd season in existence of Real Madrid CF

Real Madrid C.F.
1993–94 season
- President: Ramón Mendoza
- Head coach: Benito Floro (until 6 March 1994); Vicente del Bosque
- Stadium: Santiago Bernabéu
- La Liga: 4th (in UEFA Cup)
- Copa del Rey: Quarter-finals
- Supercopa de España: Winners
- European Cup Winners' Cup: Quarter-finals
- Copa Iberoamericana: Winners
- Top goalscorer: League: Iván Zamorano; Míchel (11 goals each); All: Iván Zamorano (17)
Home colours	Away colours

The 1993–94 season was the 63rd season for Real Madrid CF in La Liga.

== Summary ==
Real Madrid endured a turbulent season, finishing fourth in La Liga. The team extended its increasingly frustrating run of failing to win the league title to four years. Early in the season, Madrid was nearly sunk to the relegation zone after three straight defeats in four league matches. In March, Benito Floro was fired after a 2-1 defeat against UE Lleida, with the club hiring Vicente del Bosque as an interim manager until 30 June 1994 before former Real Madrid legend Jorge Valdano taking over in July.

Real also suffered a nasty Copa del Rey exit after a 1–5 aggregate loss to Tenerife in the quarter-finals and a European Cup Winners' Cup elimination as a result of a 1–2 aggregate defeat against Paris Saint-Germain in the quarter-finals.

The only trophies won during the season were the 1993 Supercopa de España and 1994 Copa Iberoamericana.

== Squad ==
Note: Flags indicate national team as defined under FIFA eligibility rules; some limited exceptions apply. Players may hold more than one non-FIFA nationality.

No.	Pos.	Nation	Player
-	GK	ESP	Francisco Buyo
-	GK	ESP	Pedro Luis Jaro
-	GK	ESP	Carlos Cano
-	DF	ESP	Manolo Sanchís
-	DF	ESP	Chendo
-	DF	BRA	Vítor
-	DF	ESP	Rafael Alkorta
-	DF	ESP	Fernando Hierro
-	DF	ESP	Luis Miguel Ramis
-	DF	ESP	Nando
-	DF	ESP	Jesús Velasco
-	DF	ESP	Francisco Villarroya
-	DF	ESP	Alberto Marcos Rey
-	DF	ESP	Mikel Lasa

No.	Pos.	Nation	Player
-	MF	CRO	Robert Prosinečki
-	MF	ESP	Martín Vázquez
-	MF	ESP	Alberto Toril
-	MF	ESP	Luis Milla
-	MF	ESP	Paco Llorente
-	MF	ESP	Míchel
-	MF	ESP	Luis Enrique
-	FW	CHI	Iván Zamorano
-	FW	ESP	Emilio Butragueño
-	FW	SVK	Peter Dubovský
-	FW	ESP	Alfonso Pérez
-	FW	ESP	José Luis Morales
-	FW	ESP	Dani

=== Transfers ===
In
Pos.	Name	from	Type
DF	Rafael Alkorta	Athletic Bilbao	€2,4 million
DF	Carlos Cano	Castilla	
MF	Peter Dubovský	Slovan Bratislava	
DF	Vítor	São Paulo FC	
MF	Luiz Fernando Gomes	S.C. Braga	loan ended

Out
Pos.	Name	To	Type
FW	Juan Esnaider	Real Zaragoza	loan
GK	Juanmi	Real Zaragoza	
DF	Maqueda	Castilla	
DF	Ricardo Rocha	Santos FC	
MF	Luiz Fernando Gomes	Real Madrid Castilla	loan

==== Winter ====
In
Pos.	Name	from	Type

Out
Pos.	Name	To	Type
DF	Vítor	São Paulo FC	

== Competitions ==
=== Friendlies ===
Pre-season

20 August 1993	Universidad de Chile	2–2	Real Madrid	Santiago, Chile
20:00 UTC−4	Guevara 49'; Estay 89'	Report	Míchel 45+1'; Ramis 78'	Stadium: Nacional; Attendance: 50,000; Referee: Enrique Marín

22 August 1993	Colo-Colo	2–0	Real Madrid	Santiago, Chile
16:00 UTC−4	Pizarro 23' (pen.); Rubio 66'	Report		Stadium: Monumental; Attendance: 67,743; Referee: Carlos Robles

25 August 1993	Nacional	2–2	Real Madrid	Montevideo, Uruguay
13:00 UTC−3	Minguta 33'; Vidal González 87'	Report	Alfonso 9'; Hierro 74'	Stadium: Centenario; Attendance: 13,405; Referee: Julio Matto

1 September 1993 Trofeo Santiago Bernabéu	Real Madrid	2–2 (9–10 p)	Inter Milan	Madrid, Spain
21:15 UTC+2	Butragueño 42'; Sanchís 46'	Report; Highlights	Schillaci 70'; Pančev 83'	Stadium: Santiago Bernabéu; Referee: Manuel Díaz Vega (Spain)
	Penalties
	Hierro (penalty scored); Míchel (penalty scored); Ramis (penalty scored); Milla (penalty scored); Dubovský (penalty scored); Dani (penalty scored); Alfonso (penalty scored); Llorente (penalty scored); Sanchís (penalty missed); Buyo (penalty scored); Hierro (penalty missed)		(penalty scored) Schillaci; (penalty scored) Fontolan; (penalty scored) A. Paganin; (penalty scored) Jonk; (penalty scored) Pančev; (penalty scored) M. Paganin; (penalty scored) Bergomi; (penalty scored) Festa; (penalty missed) Tramezzani; (penalty scored) Zenga; (penalty scored) Schillaci

Post-season

22 May 1994	Unión Española	1–0	Real Madrid	Santiago, Chile
	Ruiz	Report		Stadium: Santa Laura; Attendance: 25,000

=== La Liga ===
==== League table ====
Pos	Team	Pld	W	D	L	GF	GA	GD	Pts	Qualification or relegation
2	Deportivo La Coruña	38	22	12	4	54	18	+36	56 (Note: DEP 1–0 BAR; BAR 3–0 DEP)	Qualification for the UEFA Cup first round
3	Zaragoza	38	19	8	11	71	47	+24	46	Qualification for the Cup Winners' Cup first round (Note: Zaragoza entered UEFA Cup Winners' Cup as winners of 1993–94 Copa del Rey.)
4	Real Madrid	38	19	7	12	61	50	+11	45	Qualification for the UEFA Cup first round
5	Athletic Bilbao	38	16	11	11	61	47	+14	43	Qualification for the UEFA Cup first round
6	Sevilla	38	15	12	11	56	42	+14	42	

Source: LFP
Rules for classification: 1) points; 2) head-to-head points; 3) head-to-head goal difference; 4) head-to-head goals scored; 5) goal difference; 6) number of goals scored.

==== Results by round ====
Round	1	2	3	4	5	6	7	8	9	10	11	12	13	14	15	16	17	18	19	20	21	22	23	24	25	26	27	28	29	30	31	32	33	34	35	36	37	38
Ground	A	H	A	H	A	H	A	H	A	H	A	H	A	H	H	A	H	A	H	H	A	H	A	H	A	H	A	H	A	H	A	H	A	A	H	A	H	A
Result	W	L	L	L	D	W	D	W	W	W	W	W	L	W	D	L	W	L	W	D	D	W	W	W	W	D	L	W	W	W	L	D	L	W	L	W	L	L
Position	1	8	15	17	15	13	14	9	7	6	3	4	6	3	4	5	5	5	4	4	4	4	2	2	2	3	3	3	3	3	3	3	3	3	3	3	3	4

Source: https://www.bdfutbol.com/en/t/t1992-9339.html?tab=partits
A = Away; H = Home; W = Win; D = Draw; L = Loss; = Leader, 1993–94 UEFA Champions League Group stage; = 1994–95 UEFA Cup First round; = 1993–94 Relegation playoff to 1994–95 Segunda Division; = 1994–95 Segunda Division; R = 1994–95 UEFA Cup Winners' Cup

==== Matches ====
3 September 1993 1	CA Osasuna	1–4	Real Madrid	Pamplona
	Spasić 86'; Perin (yellow card) 84' (yellow-red card); González (yellow card); Larrainzar (yellow card) (yellow card) Bustingorri (yellow card)	Report	Alfonso 43' 45' (yellow card); Butragueño 70'; Míchel 83' (pen.) (yellow card); Sanchís (yellow card); Vítor (yellow card)	Stadium: Estadio El Sadar; Referee: Antonio Navarrete

11 September 1993 2	Real Madrid	1–3	Real Valladolid	Madrid
	Alfonso 75'	Report	Alberto 29' 48'; Cuaresma 49'	Stadium: Estadio Santiago Bernabéu; Referee: José Sanchez

17 September 1993 3	Deportivo La Coruña	4–0	Real Madrid	A Coruña
	Claudio 32' 57'; Manjarín 83'; Fran 89'	Report		Stadium: Estadio Riazor

25 September 1993 4	Real Madrid	0–1	Real Oviedo	Madrid
		Report	Janković 77'	Stadium: Estadio Santiago Bernabéu

2 October 1993 5	Atlético Madrid	0–0	Real Madrid	Madrid
		Report	Martín Vázquez (yellow card) 47' (yellow-red card)	Stadium: Estadio Vicente Calderón; Referee: Joaquín Velázquez

6 October 1993 6	Real Madrid	2–1	Racing Santander	Madrid
	Butragueño 80'; Míchel 88' (pen.)	Report	Radchenko 39'	Stadium: Estadio Santiago Bernabéu

16 October 1993 7	CD Tenerife	0–0	Real Madrid	Santa Cruz de Tenerife
		Report		Stadium: Estadio Heliodoro Rodríguez

24 October 1993 8	Real Madrid	5–0	UE Lleida	Madrid
	Alfonso 15'; Zamorano 46'; Zamorano 54'; Butrageño 87'; Míchel 89' (pen.) (yellow card)	Report		Stadium: Estadio Santiago Bernabéu; Referee: Segundo Blanco

30 October 1993 9	Rayo Vallecano	0–2	Real Madrid	Madrid
		Report	Zamorano 26'; Zamorano 76'	Stadium: Nuevo Estadio de Vallecas; Referee: Antonio Navarrente

6 November 1993 10	Real Madrid	2–1	CD Logroñés	Madrid
	Hierro 4'; Hierro 34'	Report	Iturrino 40'	Stadium: Estadio Santiago Bernabéu; Referee: Francisco Uzqueda

10 November 1993 11	Valencia CF	0–3	Real Madrid	Valencia
	Penev (yellow card); Cervera (yellow card); Giner (yellow card); Belodedici (yellow card)	Report	Alfonso 22'; Hierro 58' (yellow card); Zamorano 83'; Luis Enrique (yellow card)	Stadium: Estadio Mestalla; Referee: Miguel Lopez

20 November 1993 12	Real Madrid	2–1	Celta Vigo	Madrid
	Zamorano 9'; Luis Milla (yellow card) 70' (yellow-red card); Ramis 72' (own goal); Míchel (yellow card)	Report	Losada 47'; Ratkovic (yellow card); Indias (yellow card); Salinas (yellow card)	Stadium: Estadio Santiago Bernabéu; Referee: Juan Archeo

27 November 1993 13	Sporting Gijón	2–1	Real Madrid	Gijón
	Óscar 62'; Juanele 83' (pen.)	Report	Prosinecki 56'; Hierro (yellow card); Sanchís (yellow card); Lasa (yellow card)	Stadium: Estadio El Molinón; Referee: Juan Oliver

4 December 1993 14	Real Madrid	2–1	Athletic Bilbao	Madrid
	Zamorano 58'; Zamorano 74'; Lasa (yellow card)	Report	Garitano 76' (pen.) (yellow card); Lacabeg (yellow card); Tabuenka (yellow card)	Stadium: Estadio Santiago Bernabéu; Referee: Manuel Díaz Vega

11 December 1993 15	Real Madrid	0–0	Sevilla FC	Madrid
	Luis Enrique (yellow card)	Report	Simeone (yellow card); Martín (yellow card); Del Campo (yellow card)	Stadium: Estadio Santiago Bernabéu; Referee: Joaquin Velázquez

18 December 1993 16	Real Sociedad	2–0	Real Madrid	San Sebastián
	Pérez 2'; Kodro 64'; Alkiza (yellow card) Imaz (yellow card); Fuentes (yellow card) Lauren (yellow card)	Report	Alfonso (yellow card); Hierro (yellow card) 33' (yellow-red card)	Stadium: Estadio Anoeta; Referee: Celino Redondo

1 January 1994 17	Real Madrid	2–0	Albacete	Madrid
	Butrageño 51'; Santi Denia 56' (own goal); Prosinecki (yellow card); Luis Enrique (yellow card)	Report	Delfi Geli (yellow card); Santi Denia (yellow card)	Stadium: Estadio Santiago Bernabéu; Referee: José Sánchez

7 January 1994 18	FC Barcelona	5–0	Real Madrid	Barcelona
	Romario 24'; Koeman 47'; Romario 56'; Romario 81' iglesias 86'; Stoichkov (yellow card)	Report		Stadium: Camp Nou; Referee: Joaquín Velázquez

15 January 1994 19	Real Madrid	3–2	Real Zaragoza	Madrid
	Butrageño 11'; Míchel 75' (pen.); Míchel 83' (pen.); Luis Enrique (yellow card); Sanchis (yellow card); Milla (yellow card); Dubovsky (yellow card)	Report	Higuera 9'; Higuera 89'; Belsué (yellow card) 14' (yellow-red card); Cáceres (yellow card) 81' (yellow-red card); Lizzaralda (yellow card); Aragón (yellow card); Aguado (yellow card)	Stadium: Estadio Santiago Bernabéu; Referee: Jose Valdiveso

22 January 1994 20	Real Madrid	0–0	CA Osasuna	Madrid
		Report	Jara (yellow card); Arosarena (yellow card); Mari (yellow card)	Stadium: Estadio Santiago Bernabéu; Referee: Francisco Uzqueda

29 January 1994 21	Real Valladolid	0–0	Real Madrid	Valladolid
	Baraja (yellow card); Hurtado (yellow card); Ramon (yellow card); Naidoski (yellow card); Alberto (yellow card); Migelo (yellow card); Damian (yellow card)	Report	Lasa (yellow card)	Stadium: Estadio José Zorrilla; Referee: Raul De Losa

4 February 1994 22	Real Madrid	2–0	Deportivo La Coruña	Madrid
	Morales 56'; Míchel 71'; Chendo (yellow card); Sanchís (yellow card)	Report	Djukic (yellow card); Hoyas (yellow card)	Stadium: Estadio Santiago Bernabéu; Referee: Antonio Nieto

12 February 1994 23	Real Oviedo	0–1	Real Madrid	Oviedo
	Armando (yellow card); Suárez (yellow card)	Report	Hierro 45'; Alkorta (yellow card); Milla (yellow card)	Stadium: Carlos Tartiere; Referee: Juan Oliver

18 February 1994 24	Real Madrid	1–0	Atlético Madrid	Madrid
	Morales 83'; Buyo (yellow card)	Report	Maury (yellow card); Thomas (yellow card); Ramis (yellow card)	Stadium: Estadio Santiago Bernabéu; Referee: Juan Archeo

22 February 1994 25	Racing Santander	1–3	Real Madrid	Santander
	Gel 6' (yellow card); Alfaro (yellow card)	Report	Zigmantovic 19' (own goal); Hierro 27'; Luis Enrique 79'; Luis Milla (yellow card)	Stadium: Estadio El Sardinero; Referee: Joaquin Velazquez

26 February 1994 26	Real Madrid	1–1	CD Tenerife	Madrid
	Míchel 73' (pen.); Hierro (yellow card); Luis Enrique (yellow card); Alkorta (yellow card); Chendo (yellow card); Sanchís (yellow card); Lasa (yellow card)	Report	Redondo (red card) 37'; Dertycia 66' (yellow card); Paqui (yellow card); Latorre (yellow card) 89' (yellow-red card); Toño (yellow card); Manolo (yellow card)	Stadium: Estadio Santiago Bernabéu; Referee: Juan Marin

5 March 1994 27	UE Lleida	2–1	Real Madrid	Lleida
	Pares 19'; Andersen 29'; Arguniano (yellow card); Urbano (yellow card)	Report	Hierro 21'; Luis Enrique (yellow card); Luis Milla (yellow card)	Stadium: Estadio Camp d'Esports; Referee: Jose Valdivieso

11 March 1994 28	Real Madrid	5–2	Rayo Vallecano	Madrid
	Prosinecki 5' (pen.); Prosinecki 87' Hierro 40'; Hierro 89'; Butragueño 50'; Velasco (yellow card)	Report	Onesimo 45'; Onesimo 86'; Lema (yellow card); Calderón (yellow card)	Stadium: Estadio Santiago Bernabéu; Referee: José Sánchez

19 March 1994 29	CD Logroñés	3–4	Real Madrid	Logroño
	Romero 57'; Suárez 78'; Suárez 82' (yellow card); Antón (yellow card); Dulque (yellow card)	Report	Prosinecki 21'; Martín Vázquez 41'; Hierro 63'; Sanchís 72'	Stadium: Las Gaunas; Referee: Manuel Vega

25 March 1994 30	Real Madrid	3–2	Valencia CF	Madrid
	Dubovsky 35'; Prosinecki 47'; Butrageño 86'; Luis Enrique (yellow card); Míchel (yellow card); Hierro (yellow card)	Report	Mendieta 7'; Servidor 55'; Eloy (yellow card); González (yellow card)	Stadium: Estadio Santiago Bernabéu; Referee: Jose Gonzalez

1 April 1994 31	Celta Vigo	3–2	Real Madrid	Vigo
	Ratkovic 48'; Andriajevic 59'; Gudelj 69'	Report	Butrageño 83' (pen.); Hierro 86'	Stadium: Estadio Balaídos; Referee: Selino Redondo

5 April 1994 32	Real Madrid	2–2	Sporting Gijón	Madrid
	Prosinecki 7'; Michel 63' (pen.); Hierro (yellow card) 81' (yellow-red card)	Report	Saric 25'; Fernández 76'	Stadium: Estadio Santiago Bernabéu; Referee: Jose Paz

8 April 1994 33	Athletic Bilbao	2–1	Real Madrid	Bilbao
	Larrazabal 5' (pen.); Ziganda 22' (yellow card); Lakabeg (yellow card); Urrutia (yellow card)	Report	Míchel 89' (yellow card); Luis Enrique (yellow card); Prosinecki (yellow card); Lasa (yellow card)	Stadium: San Mamés; Referee: Antonio López Nieto

16 April 1994 34	Sevilla FC	0–1	Real Madrid	Seville
	Ricardo Bango (yellow card)	Report	Zamorano 73' (yellow card); Chendo (yellow card) 81' (yellow-red card)	Stadium: Estadio Sánchez Pizjuán; Referee: Juan Arqueo

23 April 1994 35	Real Madrid	0–2	Real Sociedad	Madrid
	Kodro 47'; Imanol 88'; Cruz (yellow card)	Report		Stadium: Estadio Santiago Bernabéu; Referee: Juan Oliver

30 April 1994 36	Albacete Balompié	1–4	Real Madrid	Albacete
	Menéndez 9'; Denia (yellow card)	Report	Zamorano 11'; Zamorano 81'; Luis Enrique 63'; Míchel 85'	Stadium: Estadio Carlos Belmonte; Referee: Juan Marin

6 May 1994 37	Real Madrid	0–1	FC Barcelona	Madrid
	Hierro (yellow card); Luis Milla (yellow card)	Report	Amor 77'; Ferrer (yellow card); Sergi (yellow card)	Stadium: Estadio Santiago Bernabéu

14 May 1994 38	Real Zaragoza	4–1	Real Madrid	Zaragoza
	Moisés 49'; Aguado 69'; Higuera 73'; Poyet 87'; Solana (yellow card); Aragón (yellow card); Franco (yellow card)	Report	Míchel 29' (pen.); Martín Vázquez (yellow card); Alkorta (yellow card); Zamorano (yellow card)	Stadium: Estadio La Romareda; Referee: José Sánchez

=== Copa del Rey ===
==== Round of 16 ====
4 January 1994 1	Real Madrid	2–2	Atlético Madrid	Madrid
20:00	Zamorano 10'; Míchel 82' (pen.)	Report	34', 53' Caminero	Stadium: Santiago Bernabéu; Attendance: 80,000; Referee: Juan Fernández Marín

13 January 1994 2	Atlético Madrid	2–3 (4–5 agg.)	Real Madrid	Madrid
20:30	Juanito 42'; Pedro 80' (pen.)	Report	Butragueño 40'; Luis Enrique 48'; Lasa 65'	Stadium: Vicente Calderón; Attendance: 50,000; Referee: Antonio López Nieto

==== Quarter-finals ====
25 January 1994 1	CD Tenerife	2–1	Real Madrid	Santa Cruz de Tenerife
21:00	Latorre 29'; Dertycia 42'	Report	Zamorano 55'	Stadium: Heliodoro Rodríguez López; Referee: Joaquín Urío Velázquez

1 February 1994 2	Real Madrid	0–3 (1–5 agg.)	CD Tenerife	Madrid
20:00		Report	Aguilera 44'; Latorre 54', 79'	Stadium: Santiago Bernabéu; Attendance: 50,000; Referee: Antonio Martín Navarrete

=== European Cup Winners' Cup ===
==== First round ====
14 September 1993 1	Real Madrid (Spain)	3–0	(Switzerland) FC Lugano	Madrid, Spain
	Dubovský 44'; Míchel 67' (pen.); Fernandez 71' (o.g.)	Report		Stadium: Santiago Bernabéu; Attendance: 37,600; Referee: Dick Jol (Netherlands)

29 September 1993 2	FC Lugano (Switzerland)	1–3 (1–6 agg.)	(Spain) Real Madrid	Zürich, Switzerland
	Subiat 61'	Report	Hierro 41'; Zamorano 77', 88'	Stadium: Letzigrund; Attendance: 8,000; Referee: Gerald Ashby (England)

==== Second round ====
20 October 1993 1	Tirol Innsbruck (Austria)	1–1	(Spain) Real Madrid	Innsbruck, Austria
	Streiter 69' (pen.)	Report	Alfonso 14'	Stadium: Tivoli; Attendance: 10,000; Referee: Ryszard Wójcik (Poland)

2 November 1993 2	Real Madrid (Spain)	3–0 (4–1 agg.)	(Austria) Tirol Innsbruck	Madrid, Spain
	Míchel 6'; Butrageño 46'; Alfonso 65'	Report		Stadium: Santiago Bernabéu; Attendance: 19,000; Referee: Vassilios Nikakis (Greece)

==== Quarter-finals ====
2 March 1994 1	Real Madrid (Spain)	0–1	(France) Paris Saint-Germain	Madrid, Spain
		Report	Weah 32'	Stadium: Santiago Bernabéu; Attendance: 64,000; Referee: Bernd Heynemann (Germany)

14 March 1994 2	Paris Saint-Germain (France)	1–1 (2–1 agg.)	(Spain) Real Madrid	Paris, France
	Gomes 51'	Report	20' Butrageño	Stadium: Parc des Princes; Attendance: 45,000; Referee: Vadim Zhuk (Belarus)

=== Supercopa ===
2 December 1993 1	Real Madrid	3–1	FC Barcelona	Madrid
21:00 CET	Alfonso 35', 89'; Zamorano 55'	Report	Stoichkov 17'	Stadium: Santiago Bernabéu; Attendance: 45,000; Referee: Ansuátegui Roca

16 December 1993 2	FC Barcelona	1–1 (2–4 agg.)	Real Madrid	Barcelona
21:15 CET	Bakero 65'	Report	Zamorano 21'	Stadium: Camp Nou; Attendance: 65,000; Referee: Díaz Vega

=== Copa Iberoamericana ===
19 May 1994 1	Real Madrid (Spain)	3–1	(Argentina) Boca Juniors	Madrid, Spain
21:00 UTC+1	Hierro 34'; Morales 70', 79'	Report	Navarro Montoya (red card) 3'; Mac Allister 85'	Stadium: Santiago Bernabéu; Attendance: 10,000; Referee: Piero Ceccarini (Italy)

25 May 1994 2	Boca Juniors (Argentina)	2–1 (3–4 agg.)	(Spain) Real Madrid	Buenos Aires, Argentina
17:00 UTC−3	da Silva 40'; Naveda 73'	Report	74' Milla	Stadium: La Bombonera; Attendance: 35,000; Referee: Jorge Nieves (Uruguay)

== Statistics ==
=== Squad statistics ===
No.	Pos	Nat	Player	Total		La Liga		Copa del Rey		Cup Winners' Cup	
No.	Pos	Nat	Player	Apps	Goals	Apps	Goals	Apps	Goals	Apps	Goals
	GK	(Spain) ESP	Buyo	48	-63	38	-50	4	-9	6	-4
	DF	(Spain) ESP	Sanchis	42	1	32	1	4	0	6	0
	DF	(Spain) ESP	Alkorta	41	0	32	0	4	0	5	0
	DF	(Spain) ESP	Hierro	41	11	33+1	10	3	0	4	1
	DF	(Spain) ESP	Mikel Lasa	37	1	26+4	0	3	1	3+1	0
	MF	(Croatia) CRO	Robert Prosinečki	30	6	18+5	6	1+1	0	3+2	0
	MF	(Spain) ESP	Míchel	47	14	37	11	4	1	6	2
	MF	(Spain) ESP	Luis Milla	38	0	28+3	0	3+1	0	2+1	0
	MF	(Spain) ESP	Luis Enrique	38	3	27+1	2	4	1	6	0
	FW	(Spain) ESP	Butragueño	33	11	22+5	8	2	1	4	2
	FW	(Chile) CHI	Iván Zamorano	44	15	33+3	11	4	2	4	2
	GK	(Spain) ESP	Pedro Jaro	0	0	0	0	0	0	0	0
	MF	(Spain) ESP	Martin Vázquez	28	1	16+7	1	1+1	0	3	0
	FW	(Spain) ESP	Alfonso Pérez	23	7	15+3	5	1	0	3+1	2
	FW	(Slovakia) SVK	Peter Dubovský	35	2	14+12	1	2+1	0	4+2	1
	DF	(Spain) ESP	Chendo	13	0	12	0	0	0	1	0
	DF	(Spain) ESP	Nando	18	0	8+6	0	0+1	0	3	0
	DF	(Spain) ESP	Ramis	21	1	7+10	1	2	0	1+1	0
	MF	(Spain) ESP	Velasco	9	0	7+1	0	0	0	1	0
	FW	(Brazil) BRA	Vitor	3	0	3	0				
	MF	(Spain) ESP	Morales	9	2	2+5	2	0+1	0	0+1	0
	MF	(Spain) ESP	Paco Llorente	7	0	2+2	0	2+1	0		
	DF	(Spain) ESP	Villarroya	7	0	1+3	0	0+1	0	1+1	0
	FW	(Spain) ESP	Dani Garcia	1	0	1	0				
	MF	(Spain) ESP	Toril	1	0	0	0	0	0	0+1	0

- Source: https://www.bdfutbol.com/en/t/t1993-942.html
