= Grégory González =

Ecuadorian footballer (born 1987)

Personal information
- Full name: Grégory González
- Date of birth: August 16, 1987 (age 39)
- Place of birth: Guayaquil, Ecuador
- Position: Defender

Team information
- Current team: Barcelona
- Number: 24

Youth career
- 2006–2008: Barcelona Sporting Club

Senior career*
Years	Team	Apps	(Gls)
2009–	Barcelona	16	(0)
- * Club domestic league appearances and goals as of 27 September 2009

Grégory González (born August 16, 1987) is an Ecuadorian footballer. He currently plays for Barcelona SC. A defender, he is a regular starter for his club.

== Club career ==
González began his career as a professional footballer at Barcelona SC. The new head coach of Barcelona SC Benito Floro requested his presence for the motivated project called La Renovacion.
