= Carlos Cano (footballer) =

Spanish footballer and goalkeeping coach

Personal information
- Full name: Carlos David Cano Marín
- Date of birth: 17 December 1969 (age 56)
- Place of birth: Berja, Spain
- Height: 1.85 m (6 ft 1 in)
- Position: Goalkeeper

Team information
- Current team: Albacete (goalkeeping coach)

Youth career
- 1984–1987: Real Madrid

Senior career*
Years	Team	Apps	(Gls)
1987–1993	Real Madrid B	60	(0)
1993–1994	Real Madrid	0	(0)
1994–1995	Celta	11	(0)
1995–1997	Oviedo	7	(0)
1998–2003	Albacete	68	(0)
2003–2005	Almería	35	(0)
Total		181	(0)

Managerial career
- 2007–: Albacete (goalkeeping coach)
- * Club domestic league appearances and goals

Carlos David Cano Marín (born 17 December 1969), is a Spanish retired footballer who played as a goalkeeper, and is currently the goalkeeping coach of Albacete Balompié. He made 18 appearances in La Liga in the 1990s for Celta Vigo and Real Oviedo.

== Club career ==
Cano was born in Berja in Almería province, in the autonomous community of Andalusia, but began his career in the youth teams of Real Madrid, who he joined in 1984. He joined the squad of the B team, Castilla, in 1987, but didn't play until after their relegation to Segunda División B in 1990. However, he was a key part of the team, newly renamed Real Madrid Deportivo, that won their 1990–91 Segunda División B group, earning promotion back to the Segunda División at the first attempt. He was promoted into the first-team squad for the 1993–94 season, but was the third choice behind Paco Buyo and Pedro Jaro and didn't play any matches.

In 1994, Real signed promising goalkeeper Santiago Cañizares from Celta Vigo, and part of the deal involved Cano moving in the opposite direction. Cano made his La Liga debut in the first match of the season as Celta, coached by Carlos Aimar, travelled to face Albacete Balompié at Estadio Carlos Belmonte. Cano conceded his first top flight goal to José Luis Zalazar, and the match ended as a 1–1 draw. Cano started the first seven games of the season, but then lost his place to Patxi Villanueva, and didn't regain it until the last four matches of the campaign. He left the club after just one season, with his final game being on 18 June 1995, away to Logroñés at Estadio Las Gaunas. Cano kept a clean sheet as Los Celestes won 3–0.

His next club was Real Oviedo, where he also struggled to establish himself, with Juan Luis Mora preferred as starting goalkeeper. He made his debut in a 1–0 home loss to Valencia at Estadio Carlos Tartiere on 8 October 1995, but played only seven league matches, conceding 17 times, in two and a half seasons before joining Albacete Balompié in January 1998.

His first match for the Segunda División club came on 7 February 1998, in a 1–0 home loss to Rayo Vallecano at Estadio Carlos Belmonte, and he appeared in every match bar one for the rest of that season. He remained at Albacete for five and a half years, racking up 76 appearances in all competitions, although the only season he was the first choice was 2000–01. In his final season at the club, 2002–03, he played a small part as they earned a promotion to the top flight, but he would not play in the first division again, as he left the club that summer.

He returned to his native province in 2003, joining Almería in the Segunda División. He was first choice in his first season, and made his debut Almería's first match, a 3–2 home win over Málaga B at Estadio Juan Rojas on 30 August. He slipped behind Joaquín Valerio in the pecking order in 2004–05, and retired at the end of that season at the age of 35, having made 36 appearances in his two seasons at Almería.

== International career ==
Cano was called up to the Spain Under-21 squad during the 1990–91 seasons, but didn't play any matches. He was never called up to the senior national side.

== Coaching career ==
After his retirement in 2005, Cano returned to the former club Albacete Balompié to become a goalkeeping coach in their youth team. In 2007, he was promoted to the same role with the senior side, a position he continues to hold.

== Honours ==
Castilla

- Segunda División B: 1990–91

Real Madrid

- Supercopa de España: 1993

== Career statistics ==
As of 1 March 2021

Club	Season	League			Cup		Total	
Club	Season	Division	Apps	Goals	Apps	Goals	Apps	Goals
Castilla (1987–90); Real Madrid Deportivo (1990–91); Real Madrid B (1991–93)	1987–88	Segunda División	0	0	0	0	0	0
Castilla (1987–90); Real Madrid Deportivo (1990–91); Real Madrid B (1991–93)	1988–89	Segunda División	0	0	0	0	0	0
Castilla (1987–90); Real Madrid Deportivo (1990–91); Real Madrid B (1991–93)	1989–90	Segunda División	0	0	0	0	0	0
Castilla (1987–90); Real Madrid Deportivo (1990–91); Real Madrid B (1991–93)	1990–91	Segunda División B	21	0	–		21	0
Castilla (1987–90); Real Madrid Deportivo (1990–91); Real Madrid B (1991–93)	1991–92	Segunda División	5	0	–		5	0
Castilla (1987–90); Real Madrid Deportivo (1990–91); Real Madrid B (1991–93)	1992–93	Segunda División	34	0	–		34	0
Castilla (1987–90); Real Madrid Deportivo (1990–91); Real Madrid B (1991–93)	Total		60	0	0	0	60	0
Real Madrid	1993–94	La Liga	0	0	0	0	0	0
Celta Vigo	1994–95	La Liga	11	0	1	0	12	0
Real Oviedo	1995–96	La Liga	3	0	0	0	3	0
Real Oviedo	1996–97	La Liga	4	0	4	0	8	0
Real Oviedo	1997–98	La Liga	0	0	0	0	0	0
Real Oviedo	Total		7	0	4	0	11	0
Albacete Balompié	1997–98	Segunda División	13	0	0	0	13	0
Albacete Balompié	1998–99	Segunda División	11	0	1	0	12	0
Albacete Balompié	1999–2000	Segunda División	6	0	4	0	10	0
Albacete Balompié	2000–01	Segunda División	29	0	0	0	29	0
Albacete Balompié	2001–02	Segunda División	5	0	2	0	7	0
Albacete Balompié	2002–03	Segunda División	4	0	1	0	5	0
Albacete Balompié	Total		68	0	8	0	76	0
Almería	2003–04	Segunda División	29	0	0	0	29	0
Almería	2004–05	Segunda División	6	0	1	0	7	0
Almería	Total		35	0	1	0	36	0
Career total			181	0	14	0	195	0
