= 1999 Copa del Rey final =

- Event: 1998–99 Copa del Rey
Atlético Madrid	Valencia
0	3
- Date: 26 June 1999
- Venue: La Cartuja, Seville
- Referee: Manuel Díaz Vega
- Attendance: 45,000
- Weather: Clear; 23 °C (73 °F)

The 1999 Copa del Rey final was the 97th final of the Spanish cup competition, the Copa del Rey. The final was played at Estadio Olímpico de Sevilla in Seville on 26 June 1999. Valencia won the cup for the sixth time by beating Atlético Madrid 3–0.

== Road to the final ==
Atlético			Round	Valencia
Opponent	Result	Legs		Opponent	Result	Legs
Real Sociedad	2–2	1–2 away; 0–1 home	Round of 16	Levante	4–0	0–3 away; 1–0 home
Espanyol	6–2	2–1 home; 1–4 away	Quarter-finals	Barcelona	7–5	2–3 away; 4–3 home
Deportivo La Coruña	1–0	0–0 home; 0–1 away	Semi-finals	Real Madrid	7–2	6–0 home; 2-1 away

== Match details ==
26 June 1999
21:30 CEST

Atlético Madrid	0–3	Valencia
	Report	López 22', 81'; Mendieta 33'

La Cartuja, Sevilla
Attendance: 45,000
Referee: Manuel Díaz Vega

Atlético Madrid	Valencia

GK	1	(Spain) José Molina
RB	20	(Spain) Delfi Geli		(substituted off) 65'
CB	6	(Spain) Santi	(c) (yellow card) 12'
CB	2	(Argentina) José Chamot	(yellow card) 75'
LB	23	(Italy) Michele Serena	(yellow card) 34'
RM	15	(Spain) Carlos Aguilera
CM	24	(Czech Republic) Radek Bejbl		(substituted off) 82'
CM	16	(Spain) Juan Carlos Valerón
LM	10	(Brazil) Juninho	(yellow card) 65'
RF	14	(Spain) José Mari	(yellow card) 50'
LF	11	(Spain) Jordi Lardín		(substituted off) 46'
Substitutes:
GK	13	(Spain) Pedro Jaro
LB	3	(Spain) Toni
LM	9	(Argentina) Santiago Solari		(substituted in) 46'
CM	18	(Spain) Roberto Fresnedoso		(substituted in) 65'
RM	22	(Argentina) Óscar Mena	(yellow card) 88'	(substituted in) 82'
Manager:
(Federal Republic of Yugoslavia) Radomir Antić

GK	1	(Spain) Santiago Cañizares
RB	20	(France) Jocelyn Angloma	(yellow card) 29'
CB	16	(France) Alain Roche
CB	5	(Federal Republic of Yugoslavia) Miroslav Đukić
LB	15	(Italy) Amedeo Carboni	(yellow card) 39'	(substituted off) 89'
RM	6	(Spain) Gaizka Mendieta (c)
CM	21	(Spain) Luis Milla
LM	8	(Spain) Javier Farinós
RF	19	(Croatia) Goran Vlaović		(substituted off) 62'
CF	11	(Romania) Adrian Ilie
LF	7	(Argentina) Claudio López		(substituted off) 87'
Substitutes:
GK	13	(Spain) Jorge Bartual
DF	3	(Spain) Juanfran		(substituted in) 89'
DF	14	(Sweden) Joachim Björklund		(substituted in) 87'
MF	10	(Sweden) Stefan Schwarz
MF	23	(Spain) Miguel Ángel Angulo		(substituted in) 62'
Manager:
(Italy) Claudio Ranieri

Copa del Rey
1998–99 Winners
Valencia
6th title
