= Riccardo Serena =

Italian footballer

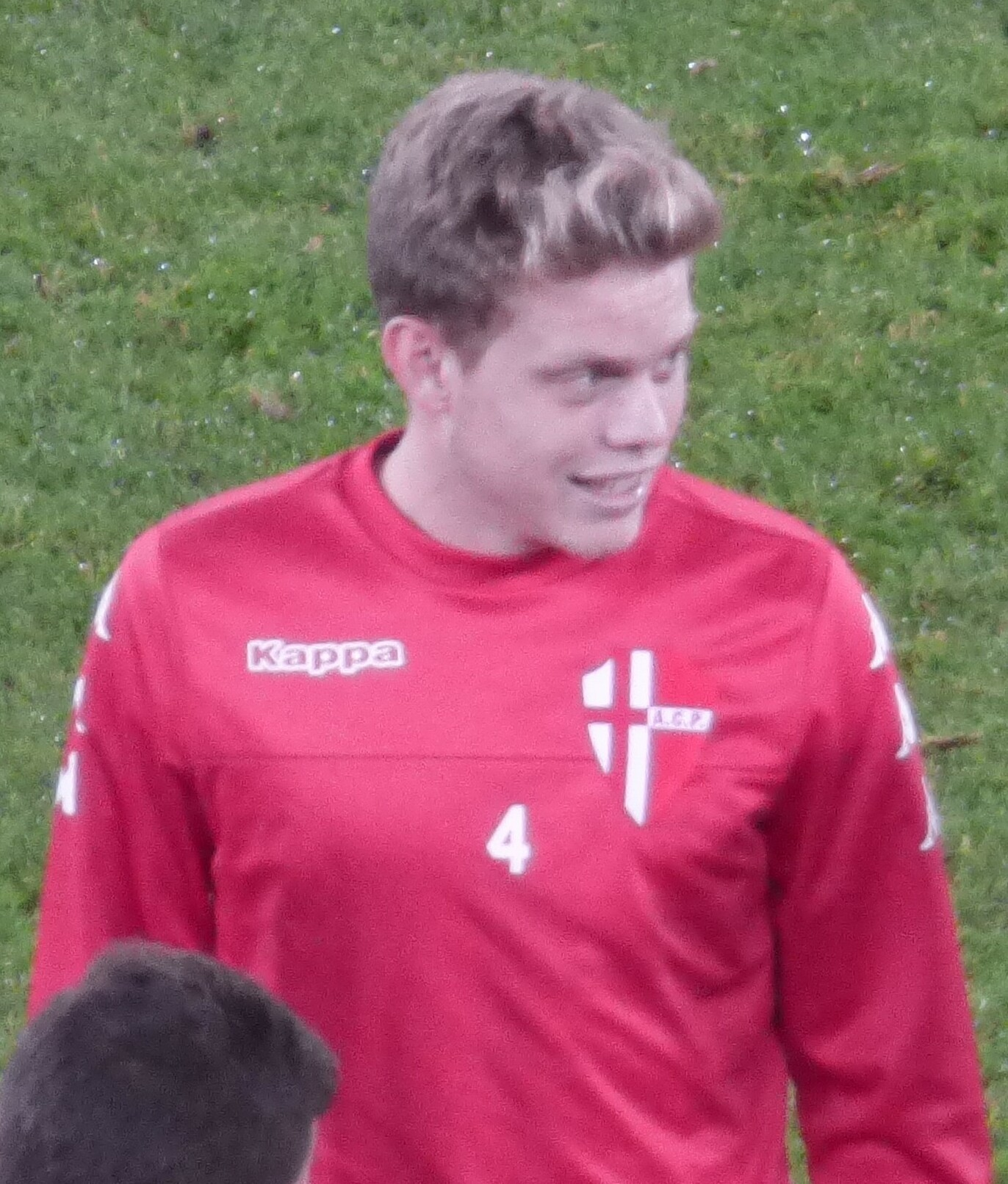
- Serena with Padova in 2018

Personal information
- Date of birth: 29 September 1996 (age 30)
- Place of birth: Florence, Italy
- Height: 1.75 m (5 ft 9 in)
- Position: Midfielder

Team information
- Current team: Adriese

Senior career*
Years	Team	Apps	(Gls)
2013–2014	Favaro		(2)
2014–2015	Union Pro	31	(1)
2015–2016	Mestre	31	(0)
2016–2017	Abano	31	(5)
2017–2020	Padova	30	(0)
2020	→ Rieti (loan)	9	(0)
2020–2021	Union San Giorgio-Sedico	26	(3)
2021–2024	Clodiense	92	(3)
2024–	Adriese	0	(0)
- * Club domestic league appearances and goals as of 5 May 2024

Riccardo Serena (born 29 September 1996) is an Italian footballer who plays as a midfielder for Serie D side Adriese.

== Club career ==
Serena played the first four seasons of his senior career in Serie D and Eccellenza (fourth- and fifth-tier).

On 12 July 2017, he signed a one-year contract with Serie C club Padova. He made his Serie C debut for Padova on 24 September 2017 in a game against Sambenedettese as an added-time substitute for Nico Pulzetti. His contract was extended for two additional seasons on 28 February 2018, as Padova advanced to Serie B at the end of the season.

On 9 January 2020, he joined Rieti on loan.

On 5 October 2020, his contract with Padova was terminated by mutual consent.

== Personal life ==
His father Michele Serena is a football coach and a former player who appeared for Italy national football team and played for Juventus, Sampdoria, Fiorentina and Atlético Madrid, among others. His younger brother Filippo Serena is also a footballer.
