= Antonio Floro =

Spanish football coach

Personal information
- Full name: Antonio Floro Esteve

Managerial career
- Years: Team
- 2013–2015: Canada U23

Antonio Floro is a Spanish football coach. He was in charge of the Canada men's national under-23 soccer team from July 2013. He is the son of Benito Floro.

In June 2015, he was named in charge of the Canadian representative team for the men's soccer tournament at the 2015 Pan American Games.
