= Filippo Serena =

Italian footballer

Personal information
- Date of birth: 12 October 1999 (age 27)
- Place of birth: Parma, Italy
- Height: 1.80 m (5 ft 11 in)
- Position: Midfielder

Team information
- Current team: Cjarlins Muzane

Youth career
- Venezia

Senior career*
Years	Team	Apps	(Gls)
2016–2022	Venezia	2	(0)
2018–2020	→ Pontedera (loan)	57	(3)
2021	→ Gubbio (loan)	6	(0)
2021–2022	→ Grosseto (loan)	18	(0)
2022	→ Pontedera (loan)	16	(0)
2022–2025	Union Clodiense Chioggia	94	(8)
2025–2026	Treviso	25	(3)
2026–	Cjarlins Muzane	0	(0)
- * Club domestic league appearances and goals as of 30 June 2026

Filippo Serena (born 12 October 1999) is an Italian professional footballer who plays as a midfielder for Serie D club Cjarlins Muzane.

== Club career ==
He made his Serie C debut for Venezia on 7 May 2017 in a game against Maceratese.

On 12 January 2021, he joined Gubbio on loan.

On 15 July 2021, he moved on loan to Grosseto. On 29 January 2022, he returned to Pontedera on loan.

On 29 August 2022, Serena's contract with Venezia was terminated by mutual consent. On 30 August 2022, Serena signed for Serie D side Clodiense.

== Personal life ==
His father Michele Serena is a football coach and a former player who appeared for Italy national football team and played for Juventus, Sampdoria, Fiorentina and Atlético Madrid, among others. His older brother Riccardo Serena is also a footballer.
