= Pablo Lago =

Spanish footballer and manager

Personal information
- Full name: Pablo Ballesteros Lago
- Date of birth: 31 August 1974 (age 52)
- Place of birth: Vegadeo, Spain
- Height: 1.77 m (5 ft 10 in)
- Position: Winger

Youth career
- 1991–1992: Oviedo

Senior career*
Years	Team	Apps	(Gls)
1990–1991	Astur Vegadense		
1992–1995	Oviedo B	26	(0)
1995–1997	Lugo	48	(15)
1997–1998	Atlético Madrid B	30	(3)
1998–2001	Mallorca	0	(0)
1998–1999	→ Rayo Vallecano (loan)	34	(1)
1999–2001	→ Las Palmas (loan)	55	(8)
2001–2002	Las Palmas	36	(4)
2002–2004	Racing Santander	18	(0)
2004–2006	Sporting Gijón	57	(2)
2006–2007	Numancia	24	(1)
2007–2009	Marino Luanco	44	(3)
Total		372	(37)

International career
2000–2001	Asturias	2	(1)

Managerial career
- 2009–2011: Astur (youth)
- 2011–2013: Luarca
- 2013–2014: Langreo
- 2014–2015: Caudal
- 2015–2017: Avilés
- 2017–2019: Gimnástica
- 2020: Sporting Gijón (youth)
- 2020–2022: Ponferradina (assistant)
- * Club domestic league appearances and goals

Pablo Ballesteros Lago (born 31 August 1974) is a Spanish retired footballer who played as a winger, and a current manager.

He amassed La Liga totals of 74 matches and seven goals over four seasons, in representation of Las Palmas and Racing de Santander (two years apiece). He added 180 appearances and 12 goals in Segunda División, in a 14-year professional career.

In 2011, Lago started working as a manager.

== Playing career ==
Lago was born in Vegadeo, Asturias, and played amateur football well into his 20s. In 1997, after scoring a career-best 15 goals with CD Lugo, he joined Segunda División side Atlético Madrid B.

Lago made his professional debut on 31 August 1997, starting in a 1–1 home draw against UD Las Palmas. He scored his first goal in the second level the following 15 February, netting his team's second in a 3–0 home win over Elche CF.

In 1998, Lago moved to La Liga club RCD Mallorca, being immediately loaned to division two's Rayo Vallecano. He achieved promotion at the end of the season during his spell at the latter, being a regular starter and being sent off for the first time (of only two) in his career.

Lago subsequently enjoyed a two-season loan deal at Las Palmas, before signing permanently for them in 2001. His maiden appearance in the top tier took place on 10 September 2000 when he started in a 0–3 home defeat to Deportivo Alavés, and scored his first goal in the competition seven days later in a 2–2 away draw against Real Oviedo.

Lago agreed to a four-year contract at Racing de Santander in late July 2002 after Las Palmas' relegation, but featured sparingly during his two-year stint. He then signed a deal with second division side Sporting de Gijón, being mainly used as a substitute.

After one second-tier season with CD Numancia, Lago moved to the lower leagues with Marino de Luanco in 2007, retiring two years later at the age of 34.

== Coaching career ==
Lago began working as a manager immediately after retiring, being in charge of Astur CF's youth teams before being appointed at the helm of Luarca CF in 2011. He remained at the latter club for two seasons, before being named UP Langreo coach on 4 June 2013.

On 26 June 2014, four days after achieving promotion to the third division with Langreo, Lago signed with Caudal Deportivo. He left the following 2 June as his contract was due to expire, and joined Real Avilés on 6 July.

Lago was sacked by Avilés on 25 April 2017, and took over Gimnástica de Torrelavega on 16 October.
