= Juanma (footballer, born 1977) =

Spanish footballer

Personal information
- Full name: Juan Manuel Delgado Moreno
- Date of birth: 13 January 1977 (age 49)
- Place of birth: Huelva, Spain
- Height: 1.81 m (5 ft 11 in)
- Position: Centre-back

Senior career*
Years	Team	Apps	(Gls)
1995–1996	San Roque	19	(0)
1996–1997	Ayamonte	40	(2)
1997–1999	Recreativo	51	(0)
1999–2000	Atlético Madrid B	32	(2)
2000	Salamanca	18	(0)
2001–2005	Racing Santander	131	(6)
2005–2007	Deportivo La Coruña	30	(4)
2007–2008	Tenerife	31	(0)
2009	Cádiz	15	(1)
Total		367	(15)
- * Club domestic league appearances and goals

Juan Manuel Delgado Moreno (born 13 January 1977), known as Juanma, is a Spanish former professional footballer who played as a central defender.

He amassed La Liga totals of 138 games and seven goals over the course of six seasons, representing in the competition Racing de Santander and Deportivo de La Coruña.

== Career ==
Born in Huelva, Andalusia, Juanma started his professional career with local Recreativo de Huelva in 1997. He signed for Atlético Madrid two years later, but spent the vast majority of his stint with the B team and left after one season for UD Salamanca, also in the Segunda División; however, in January 2001, he moved to Racing de Santander, making his debut in La Liga on the 14th in a 0–1 home defeat against Málaga CF.

Juanma achieved top-flight promotion in 2002. He scored his first goal in the competition on 26 January 2003, but in a 3–1 loss away to CA Osasuna.

Juanma was manager Joaquín Caparrós' first signing for Deportivo de La Coruña when he joined in July 2005 from Racing on a free transfer. On 26 October, in a home fixture against Real Madrid, he scored twice as Depor won 3–1, and netted four goals in 23 games during the campaign.

In 2006–07, however, after Portuguese Jorge Andrade fully recovered from injury, Juanma would be virtually absent from the team's starting eleven. He subsequently joined second-tier club CD Tenerife ahead of the following season.

On 12 January 2009, the free agent Juanma agreed to a contract at Cádiz CF in the Segunda División B. He scored on his debut, a 2–1 away victory over Granada 74 CF, in an eventual promotion; he was released in September.

== Post-retirement ==
After retiring, Juanma opened a gymnasium and worked as a personal trainer.
