= Marcos Márquez =

Spanish footballer

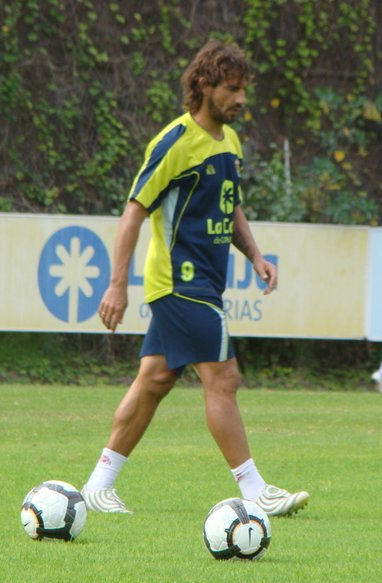
- Márquez in training with Las Palmas

Personal information
- Full name: Marcos Márquez Lebrero
- Date of birth: 23 July 1977 (age 49)
- Place of birth: Seville, Spain
- Height: 1.85 m (6 ft 1 in)
- Position: Striker

Youth career
- Sevilla

Senior career*
Years	Team	Apps	(Gls)
1995–1997	Utrera	28	(3)
1997–1999	Sevilla B	43	(15)
1999–2000	Atlético Madrid B	47	(12)
2001–2002	Córdoba	42	(6)
2003–2004	Ceuta	45	(13)
2004–2005	Leganés	27	(14)
2005–2010	Las Palmas	178	(73)
2010–2012	Salamanca	59	(15)
Total		469	(151)

Managerial career
- 2012–2013: AD Nervión (youth)
- 2013–2015: Soleá San Pablo
- * Club domestic league appearances and goals

Marcos Márquez Lebrero (born 23 July 1977) is a Spanish former professional footballer who played as a striker.

Over nine seasons, he amassed Segunda División totals of 249 matches and 78 goals, mainly at the service of Las Palmas.

== Club career ==
Born in Seville, Andalusia, and raised in the youth academy of local Sevilla FC, Márquez left in 1999 and signed for Atlético Madrid B, playing one season with the club in the Segunda División. In July 2000, he returned to his native region by joining Córdoba CF, where he underperformed.

Following stints with AD Ceuta and CD Leganés, both from Segunda División B, Márquez moved to UD Las Palmas on 15 June 2005. From then onwards, he became one of the most consistent players of the team, while also captaining them on various occasions; El Matador (nickname he received whilst in the Canary Islands) went down in the history of the club on 24 June 2006 as he scored the goal that meant its return to the second division, the game's only at CD Linares after a pass from Nauzet Alemán.

Márquez continued to feature heavily in the subsequent years: in the 2006–07 campaign, he won both the Pichichi Trophy and the Zarra Trophy after scoring 21 times. Forming an efficient attacking partnership with Adrián Colunga in 2007–08 (29 goals between the pair) he was again the main striker the following season and added 21 more, good enough for third in the individual chart although his side barely avoided a drop.

After a poor 2009–10 campaign – 34 matches, three goals – Márquez left Las Palmas and signed for another club in the second tier, UD Salamanca, suffering relegation in his first year. In August 2012, aged 35, he announced his retirement.
