= Benito Floro =

Spanish football manager

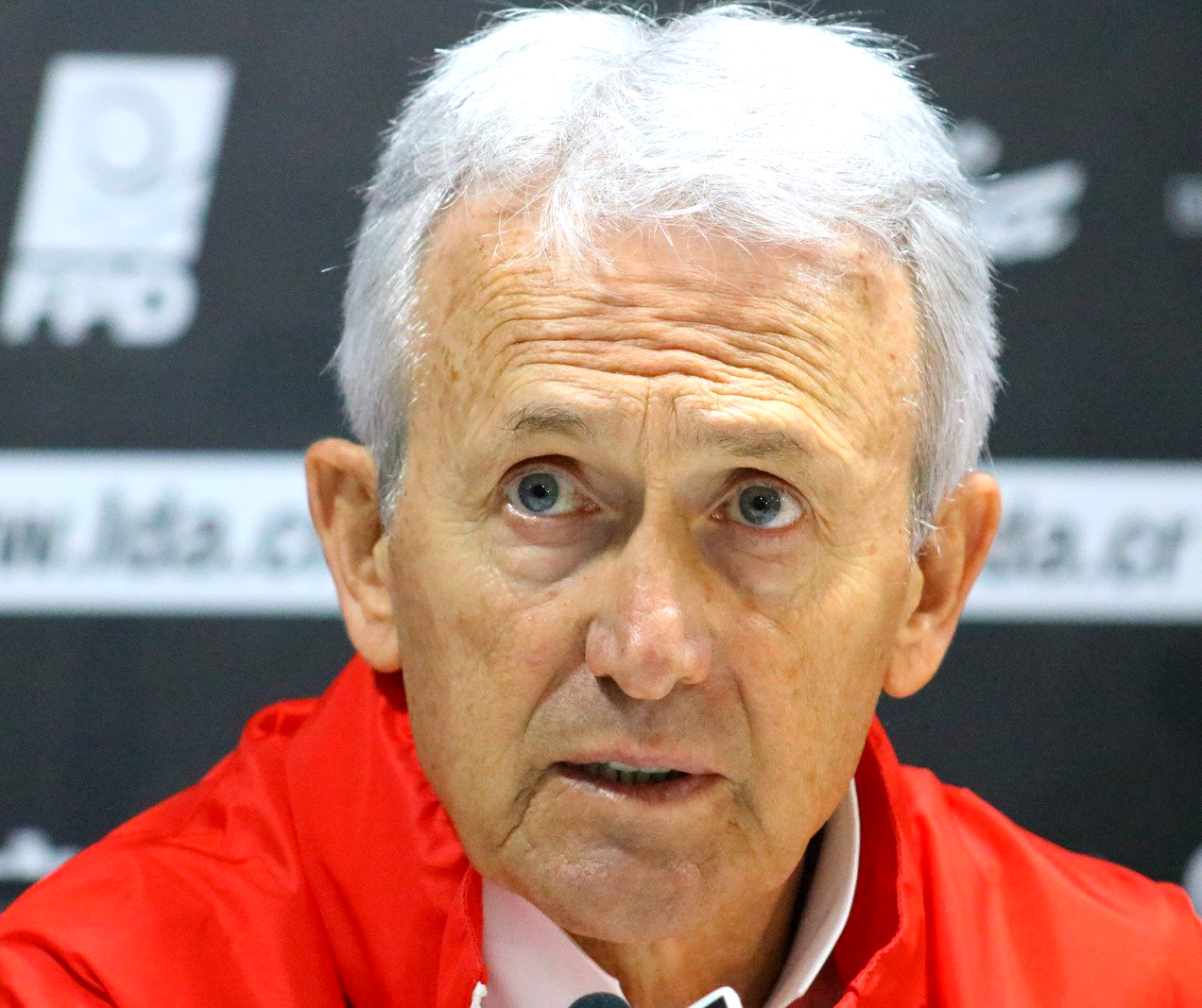
- Floro with Alajuelense in 2017

Personal information
- Full name: Benito Floro Sanz
- Date of birth: 2 June 1952 (age 74)
- Place of birth: Gijón, Spain

Managerial career
- Years: Team
- 1978–1980: Silla
- 1980–1983: Torrent
- 1983–1984: Dénia
- 1984–1985: Gandía
- 1985–1986: Alzira
- 1986–1987: Ontinyent
- 1987–1988: Olímpic Xàtiva
- 1988–1989: Villarreal
- 1989–1992: Albacete
- 1992–1994: Real Madrid
- 1994–1996: Albacete
- 1996–1997: Sporting Gijón
- 1998: Vissel Kobe
- 1999–2001: Monterrey
- 2002–2004: Villarreal
- 2004: Mallorca
- 2009: Barcelona SC
- 2012: WAC
- 2013–2016: Canada
- 2016–2017: Alajuelense

Benito Floro Sanz (born 2 June 1952) is a Spanish football manager.

== Football career ==
Floro was born in Gijón, Asturias. During his professional career he managed Albacete (two spells, starting off in 1989 in Segunda División B and leading the club to a first-ever La Liga promotion in just two years), Real Madrid (winning the Copa del Rey in his first season), Sporting de Gijón, Vissel Kobe, Monterrey, Villarreal– he had already coached the Valencians in the third tier – Mallorca (leaving the Balearic Islands side after just a few months after being appointed in the summer of 2004) and Barcelona SC.

Starting in 2005, Floro briefly worked for former club Real Madrid as director of football, then switched to sports commentator with Telecinco. On 5 July 2013, the Canadian Soccer Association announced him as the new manager of the national team, taking over from interim coach Colin Miller on 1 August.

On 14 September 2016, Floro's contract was not renewed after failing to qualify the team for the 2018 FIFA World Cup. On 23 December, he was appointed at Alajuelense in the Costa Rican Liga FPD.

== Personal life ==
Floro's son, Antonio, was also a football coach. He worked in Canada too.

== Honours ==
=== Manager ===
Albacete

- Segunda División: 1990–91
- Segunda División B: 1989–90

Real Madrid

- Copa del Rey: 1992–93
- Supercopa de España: 1993

Villarreal

- UEFA Intertoto Cup: 2003

== Career ==
In December 2008, he signed a two-year contract with Barcelona S.C. of Guayaquil, Ecuador, and was scheduled to begin coaching the club in January 2009. Under his direction, the team played 17 matches, winning five, drawing five, and losing seven, leaving it tenth and third from bottom in Ecuador's Primera División. Club president Eduardo Maruri dismissed him on June 1, 2009, citing the team's poor results.
