= Juan González (footballer, born 1972) =

Uruguayan footballer (born 1972)

Personal information
- Full name: Juan Antonio González Crespo
- Date of birth: 27 May 1972 (age 54)
- Place of birth: Montevideo, Uruguay
- Height: 1.78 m (5 ft 10 in)
- Position: Forward

Senior career*
Years	Team	Apps	(Gls)
1991–1993	Basañez		
1994–1997	Nacional	49	(28)
1997–2001	Oviedo	61	(12)
1999	→ Atlético Madrid (loan)	8	(2)
2002	Granada	16	(3)
2002	Fénix	2	(0)
2003	Cerro	3	(0)
2004	River Plate (UY)		
2004–2005	Oviedo	32	(8)
2006	Fénix	8	(0)
Total		179	(53)

International career
1995–1999	Uruguay	4	(0)
- * Club domestic league appearances and goals

Juan Antonio González Crespo (born 27 May 1972) is a Uruguayan retired footballer who played as a forward.

== Club career ==
González was born in Montevideo. During his 15-year professional career, he represented Basañez, Club Nacional de Football, Centro Atlético Fénix, C.A. Cerro and River Plate de Montevideo in his homeland, also having abroad stints with Real Oviedo, Atlético Madrid – being loaned by the Asturias club in January 1999, he was highly unsuccessful – and Granada CF, all in Spain (the first two in La Liga).

In the 2004–05 season, González made a brief return to Oviedo, with the team then in the fourth division, wrapping up his career two years later with another former side, Fénix. In early 2008, González began a new career in his country as a bus driver.

== International career ==
González made four appearances for Uruguay, during as many years. His first came on 11 October 1995, in a friendly with Brazil (0–1 loss, in Bahia).
