= Zoran Njeguš =

Serbian footballer and manager

Personal information
- Date of birth: 25 June 1973 (age 53)
- Place of birth: Titovo Užice, SFR Yugoslavia
- Height: 1.83 m (6 ft 0 in)
- Positions: Defender; midfielder

Senior career*
Years	Team	Apps	(Gls)
1993–1995	Sloboda Užice	57	(8)
1995–1998	Red Star Belgrade	63	(7)
1998–2001	Atlético Madrid	52	(3)
2001–2004	Sevilla	57	(1)
Total		229	(19)

International career
1996–2003	Serbia and Montenegro	7	(0)

Managerial career
- 2009–2010: Sloboda Užice
- 2010–2011: Javor Ivanjica
- 2011–2012: Spartak Subotica
- 2012–2013: Borac Čačak
- 2013–2014: Novi Pazar
- 2020: Rad
- 2020–2021: Zlatibor Čajetina
- * Club domestic league appearances and goals

Zoran Njeguš (Serbian Cyrillic: Зоран Његуш; born 25 June 1973) is a Serbian former professional football player and a former manager. Over the course of his career, he played for Sloboda Užice, Red Star Belgrade, Atlético Madrid, and Sevilla. He played for Yugoslavia's national football team seven times, although his last international appearance was after Yugoslavia's name was changed to Serbia and Montenegro.

== Club career ==
=== Red Star Belgrade ===
Njeguš joined Red Star Belgrade in the summer of 1995. Over the course of three seasons at Red Star, Njeguš played a total of 103 matches. He played in every match of Red Star's 1996–97 UEFA Cup Winners' Cup campaign up to their elimination against Barcelona in the second round.

=== Atlético Madrid ===
On 8 May 1998, Njeguš joined Spanish club Atlético Madrid in a 7.5 million DM transfer from Red Star Belgrade. He was coach Arrigo Sacchi's first pick of that year's summer transfer window. He played for three seasons at Atlético Madrid, playing a total of 52 matches.

=== Sevilla ===
On 30 July 2001, Sevilla officially announced the loaning of Njeguš from Atlético Madrid. His loan to Sevilla was renewed for a season on 27 July 2002. After almost three seasons with Sevilla, a bitter dispute occurred from a drastic punishment given to him after he returned late from the 2003-2004 winter break. During court proceedings on settling the contract dispute between Sevilla and himself, a jurist stated that Njeguš was "depressed, eating compulsively, and gained 8 kilograms" as a result of Sevilla sanctioning him. Njeguš subsequently retired.

== International career ==
Although Njeguš was not called up for a major international competition, he made his debut under for the Yugoslavia national team under coach Slobodan Santrač on 28 December 1996 in a 3–2 away win against Argentina. Santrač ultimately preferred Albert Nađ and Branko Brnović as his defensive midfield picks, with the latter being called up to the 1998 FIFA World Cup. Although Njeguš was not called up for that World Cup, he started under coach Milan "Bard" Živadinović in Yugoslavia's first post-World Cup friendly at the Castelão in front of approximately 70,000 people against Brazil on 23 September 1998, which Yugoslavia tied 1–1. His final international was a June 2003 European Championship qualification match away against Azerbaijan.

== Personal life ==
In March 2016, Njeguš was arrested for allegedly being involved in real estate fraud in the Zlatibor region. He was released from custody 10 days later.

== Notes ==
Known as FR Yugoslavia until 4 February 2003.
