= José Chamot =

Argentine footballer and manager

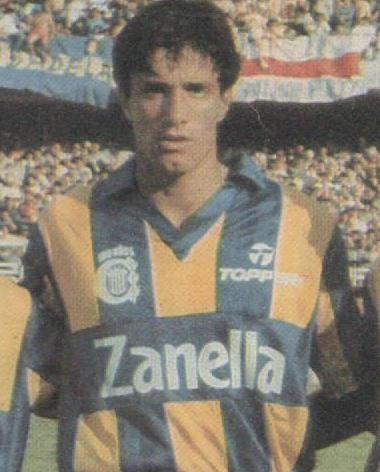
- Chamot in 1989

Personal information
- Full name: José Antonio Chamot
- Date of birth: 17 May 1969 (age 57)
- Place of birth: Concepción del Uruguay, Argentina
- Height: 1.85 m (6 ft 1 in)
- Position: Left-back

Senior career*
Years	Team	Apps	(Gls)
1988–1990	Rosario Central	48	(2)
1990–1993	Pisa	87	(1)
1993–1994	Foggia	30	(0)
1994–1998	Lazio	100	(1)
1998–2000	Atlético Madrid	45	(1)
2000–2003	Milan	49	(0)
2003–2004	Leganés	1	(0)
2004–2006	Rosario Central	4	(0)
Total		364	(5)

International career
1996	Argentina Olympic (O.P.)	5	(0)
1993–2002	Argentina	43	(2)

Managerial career
- 2009–2010: Rosario Central (assistant)
- 2011–2012: River Plate (assistant)
- 2017–2019: Rosario Central B
- 2019: Libertad
Medal record
Men's Football
Representing Argentina
Olympic Games
Silver medal – second place	1996 Atlanta	Team Competition
- * Club domestic league appearances and goals

José Antonio Chamot (born 17 May 1969) is an Argentine football manager and former player. He played as a full-back, mainly on the left flank but occasionally also on the right and, very rarely, as a centre-back.

== Club career ==
Born in Concepción del Uruguay, Chamot began his career with Rosario Central in his native Argentina, and then moved to Italy, where he played for Pisa (1990–93), Foggia (1993–94) and Lazio (1994–98). His spell at Lazio cemented him as one of the top full-backs in the Serie A; during his last season with the Roman club, he won the 1997–98 Coppa Italia. While playing for Lazio, he deliberately shook referee Pierluigi Collina's hand too firmly post match, and earned a one-game ban for dissent.

Chamot then moved to Spain, where he spent one and a half seasons with Atlético Madrid, before returning to Italy (in the January 2000 transfer window) in order to join giants A.C. Milan, for whom he played until 2003, winning the 2002–03 UEFA Champions League and the 2002–03 Coppa Italia. He left Milan during the summer of 2003 (by that time he had lost his place in the starting eleven) and signed for Spanish side Leganés. After an injury-plagued season there, Chamot returned to Argentina to spend the final years of his career (2004–06) with Rosario Central, the club where he had started as a professional footballer; again, however, he was troubled by injuries, and announced his retirement at the end of 2006.

== International career ==
Chamot earned 43 caps for Argentina over the course of 9 years (1993–2002), and played in three FIFA World Cups (1994, 1998 and 2002). He was Argentina's starting left-back during both the 1994 and 1998 World Cups, and also played one match in 2002 against Sweden, where he was employed as right-back.

He was also part of the Argentina Argentina under-23 squad that won the silver medal at the 1996 Summer Olympics in Atlanta, Georgia, as one of the three overage players (older than 23) allowed for every squad.

== Coaching career ==
From July 2009 to March 2010, Chamot was the assistant manager of Rosario Central. In June 2011, be was appointed as assistant manager under Matías Almeyda at River Plate. The left in November 2012 after 18 months.

At the end of December 2015, he was appointed as coordinator for the youth sector of Rosario Central. One year later it was reported, that Chamot couldn't agree with the club on a new contract, and decided to leave his position. He returned to the club on 19 December 2017, where he was appointed as manager for the reserve team of Rosario. He held the position until 7 March 2019, where he was appointed as manager of Club Libertad. Chamot was released on 12 December 2019.

== Honours ==
Lazio

- Coppa Italia: 1997–98

Atlético Madrid

- Copa del Rey runner-up: 1998–99, 1999–2000

AC Milan

- UEFA Champions League: 2002–03
- Coppa Italia: 2002–03

Argentina

- Olympic Silver Medal: 1996
