= Michele Serena =

Italian footballer (born 1970)

Personal information
- Date of birth: 10 March 1970 (age 56)
- Place of birth: Venice, Italy
- Height: 1.78 m (5 ft 10 in)
- Position: Right-back

Senior career*
Years	Team	Apps	(Gls)
1986–1987	Mestre	1	(0)
1987–1989	Venezia	44	(0)
1989–1990	Juventus	4	(0)
1990–1991	Monza	24	(2)
1991–1992	Verona	26	(3)
1992–1995	Sampdoria	92	(1)
1995–1998	Fiorentina	69	(3)
1998–1999	Atlético Madrid	35	(3)
1999–2000	Parma	15	(0)
2000–2003	Inter Milan	25	(0)
Total		335	(12)

International career
1990	Italy U21	1	(0)
1998	Italy	1	(0)

Managerial career
- 2008: Venezia
- 2009: Venezia
- 2009–2010: Mantova
- 2011: Grosseto
- 2011–2013: Spezia
- 2014: Padova
- 2014–2015: Venezia
- 2015: FeralpiSalò
- 2017–2018: FeralpiSalò
- 2018–2019: Vicenza
- 2021–2022: Legnago
- * Club domestic league appearances and goals

Michele Serena (Italian pronunciation: [miˈkɛːle seˈreːna]; born 10 March 1970) is an Italian football manager, and former football defender, most recently in charge as manager of Serie C club Legnago. He usually played as a right-back, although he was capable of playing on either flank.

== Playing career ==
Serena started his playing career with Mestre of Serie C2, then become Venezia following a merger. He was signed by Juventus in 1989, and made four league appearances with the bianconeri. He then played for Monza and Verona on single season loans, before signing for Sampdoria in 1992, where he played for three years. In 1995, he was signed by Fiorentina, and in 1998 by La Liga club Atlético Madrid, where he made 35 appearances with 3 goals during his only season with the club. During his time with the Spanish club, he gained a spot in the Italy national team, making his one and only appearance with the azzurri on 5 September 1998, in a 2–0 away win to Wales, under Dino Zoff. He then returned to Italy the following season to play for Parma, making 15 league appearances, but moved on to Inter Milan soon after, during the winter transfer market (in an exchange with Paulo Sousa). With the nerazzurri jersey, he made only 25 appearances in three seasons, mainly because of the several injuries he experienced during his years at Inter, which forced him to retire in 2003.

== Coaching career ==
=== Venezia ===
In 2007, he became the Venezia youth team coach, also getting involved in obtaining a coaching licence. On 11 March 2008, he was unveiled as new Venezia head coach, replacing Salvo D'Adderio. He was sacked a few months later, on 11 November, due to poor results. He was recalled in February 2009, with Venezia placed in the league bottom, and managed to bring his club out of the relegation zone.

=== Mantova ===
This attracted interest from Serie B club Mantova, who appointed him as new boss for the 2009–10 season. Mantova finished third bottom of Serie B and were relegated. However, due to financial difficulties, their entry to Lega Pro Prima Divisione was rejected and the club folded.

=== Grosseto ===
On 13 January 2011, Serena was appointed the manager's job at Serie B side, Grosseto, until the end of the 2010–11 season.

=== Spezia ===
On 5 October 2011, he became the new coach of Spezia in Lega Pro Prima Divisione group A, in place of the sacked Elio Gustinetti, but on 4 January 2013 he was sacked.

=== Padova ===
On 2 February 2014, Serena became the new coach of Padova in Serie B, in place of the sacked Bortolo Mutti.

=== Vicenza ===
On 27 December 2018, he was appointed head coach of Vicenza in Serie C. He resigned on 24 February 2019.

=== Legnago ===
On 27 December 2021, Serena returned into management after almost three years without a club, as the new head coach of Serie C club Legnago. He was dismissed on 28 March 2022 following a string of negative results.

== Personal life ==
His sons Riccardo Serena and Filippo Serena are professional footballers as well.

== Honours ==
=== Player ===
Juventus

- Coppa Italia: 1989–90
- UEFA Cup: 1989–90

Sampdoria

- Coppa Italia: 1993–94

Fiorentina

- Coppa Italia: 1995–96
- Supercoppa Italiana: 1996

Parma

- Supercoppa Italiana: 1999
