= 1993 Supercopa de España =

Real Madrid	Barcelona
4	2
- on aggregate

First leg
Real Madrid	Barcelona
3	1
- Date: 2 December 1993
- Venue: Santiago Bernabéu, Madrid
- Referee: Ansuátegui Roca

Second leg
Barcelona	Real Madrid
1	1
- Date: 16 December 1993
- Venue: Camp Nou, Barcelona
- Referee: Díaz Vega

The 1993 Supercopa de España was a two-leg Spanish football fixture played on 2 December and 16 December 1993. It was contested by Real Madrid, who were Spanish Cup winners in 1992–93, and FC Barcelona, who won the 1992–93 Spanish League. Real Madrid won 4–2 on aggregate.

== Match details ==
=== First leg ===
2 December 1993
21:00 CET

Real Madrid	3–1	Barcelona
Alfonso 35', 89'; Zamorano 55'		Stoichkov 17'

Santiago Bernabéu, Madrid
Attendance: 45,000
Referee: Ansuátegui Roca

=== Second leg ===
16 December 1993
21:15 CET

Barcelona	1–1	Real Madrid
Bakero 65'		Zamorano 21'

Camp Nou, Barcelona
Attendance: 65,000
Referee: Díaz Vega

Supercopa de España
1993 Winners
Real Madrid
Fourth Title

== See also ==
- El Clásico
- 1993–94 La Liga
- 1993–94 Copa del Rey
- 1993–94 FC Barcelona season
- 1993–94 Real Madrid CF season
