= Pedro Jaro =

Spanish footballer

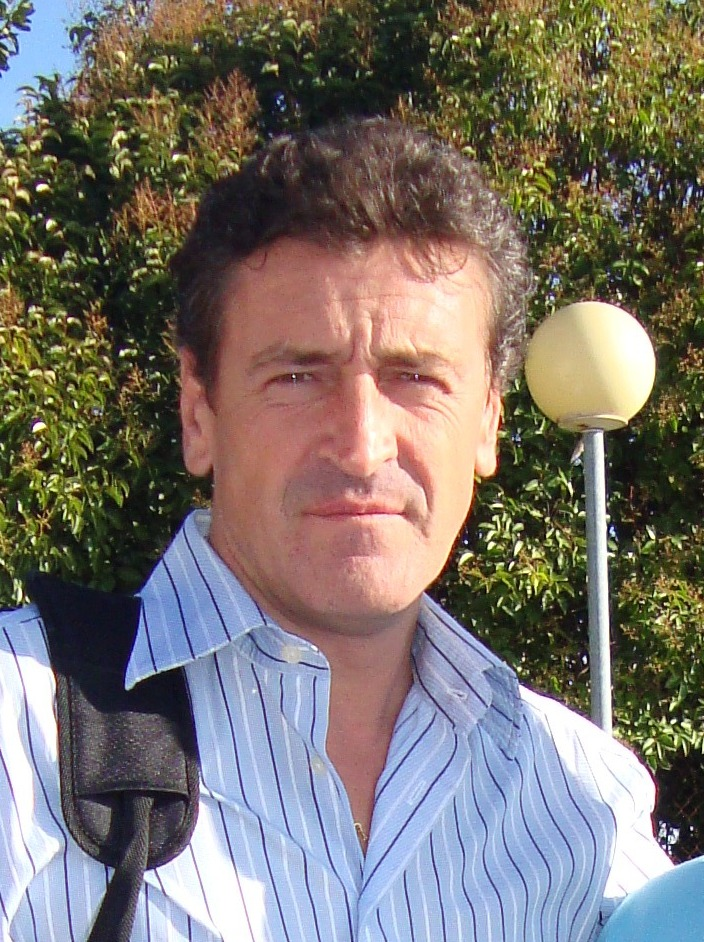
- Jaro in 2009

Personal information
- Full name: Pedro Luis Jaro Reguero
- Date of birth: 22 February 1963 (age 63)
- Place of birth: Madrid, Spain
- Height: 1.86 m (6 ft 1 in)
- Position: Goalkeeper

Youth career
- Moscardó

Senior career*
Years	Team	Apps	(Gls)
1982–1988	Cádiz	69	(0)
1988–1990	Málaga	73	(0)
1990–1994	Real Madrid	23	(0)
1994–1997	Betis	80	(0)
1997–1999	Atlético Madrid	3	(0)
Total		248	(0)
- * Club domestic league appearances and goals

Pedro Luis Jaro Reguero (born 22 February 1963) is a Spanish former professional footballer who played as a goalkeeper.

== Playing career ==
After emerging through local CDC Moscardó's youth ranks, Madrid-born Jaro started his professional career with Cádiz CF in the 1983–84 season, playing once in an eventual La Liga relegation. In 1988 he moved to neighbours CD Málaga, who were also relegated at the end of his second year.

Subsequently, Jaro spent four years at national powerhouse Real Madrid, where he could only appear in 23 league games, barred by legendary Francisco Buyo. In the 1994–95 campaign, he helped Real Betis overachieve for a final third place in the top division immediately after having promoted; he took part in all 38 matches and only conceded 25 goals, good enough for the Ricardo Zamora Trophy.

== Coaching career ==
After two years at Atlético Madrid, playing second-fiddle to another Spanish international, José Francisco Molina, Jaro retired at 36 with 237 appearances in the top flight. He went on to serve as goalkeeping coach for Atlético, the Spain youth national team and Real Madrid, moving to the latter in 1995 and remaining there for over a decade; in the same capacity, he also worked under Juande Ramos at FC Dnipro Dnipropetrovsk and Málaga CF.

== Honours ==
Real Madrid

- Copa del Rey: 1992–93
- Supercopa de España: 1990, 1993
- Copa Iberoamericana: 1994

Individual

- Ricardo Zamora Trophy: 1994–95
