= 1999–2000 Valencia CF season =

Valencia
1999–00 season
- Chairman: Pedro Cortés
- Manager: Héctor Cúper
- Stadium: Mestalla
- La Liga: 3rd (in UEFA Champions League)
- Copa del Rey: Round of 32
- Champions League: Runners-up
- Supercopa de España: Winners
- Top goalscorer: League: Gaizka Mendieta (13); All: Mendieta (19)
Home colours	Away colours	Third colours

During the 1999–2000 Spanish football season, Valencia competed in La Liga.

== Season summary ==
During Spring of 1999, after rumours of Claudio Ranieri being linked to Atlético Madrid the club agreed to replace the Italian head coach for the upcoming season, the final choices were Radomir Antić from Atlético Madrid with a contract until 2000 with colchoneros and Argentine Héctor Cúper from Mallorca for free in June and whom, finally, was appointed as new manager. Valencia emerged as a world football heavyweight after reaching the Champions League final. New coach Héctor Cúper focused heavily on making the defence invincible, although, despite the general perception of a much more defensive Valencia, they actually conceded the same number of league goals as they had under previous coach Claudio Ranieri. Among the key players were playmaker Gaizka Mendieta (voted as the best midfielder in the Champions League), fellow midfielder Gerard, goalkeeper Santiago Cañizares, winger Javier Farinós and striker Claudio López, who was sold to Lazio at the end of the season. Lazio had been Valencia's opponents in the quarter-final of the Champions League, which resulted in a 5–2 victory for Valencia against the eventual Italian champions. Gerard was also sold to the team that had nurtured him, Barcelona, for £15 million. Barcelona had been Valencia's opponents in the semi-finals, and had been crushed 4–1 away. A 2–1 defeat at the Camp Nou still saw Valencia progress to the final at the Stade de France, where they came up against Real Madrid in the first ever all-Spanish final of the competition. Valencia's dreams were shattered by a clear 3–0 defeat.

== Squad ==
Note: Flags indicate national team as defined under FIFA eligibility rules; some limited exceptions apply. Players may hold more than one non-FIFA nationality.

No.	Pos.	Nation	Player
1	GK	ESP	Santiago Cañizares
2	DF	ARG	Mauricio Pellegrino
3	DF	SWE	Joachim Björklund
4	DF	ESP	Javier Navarro
5	DF	YUG	Miroslav Đukić
6	MF	ESP	Gaizka Mendieta
7	FW	ARG	Claudio López
8	MF	ESP	Javier Farinós
9	MF	ESP	Óscar
10	MF	ESP	Angulo
11	FW	ROU	Adrian Ilie
12	MF	ESP	Jandro
13	GK	ESP	Jorge Bartual
14	MF	ESP	Gerard

No.	Pos.	Nation	Player
15	DF	ITA	Amedeo Carboni
16	DF	FRA	Alain Roche
17	FW	ESP	Juan Sánchez
18	FW	ARG	Kily González
19	FW	CRO	Goran Vlaović
20	DF	FRA	Jocelyn Angloma
21	MF	ESP	Luis Milla
22	DF	ESP	Gerardo
23	MF	ESP	David Albelda
24	DF	ARG	Daniel Fagiani
25	GK	ESP	Andrés Palop
27	MF	ESP	Curro Torres
29	GK	ESP	Jonathan López
37	MF	ESP	Alex Pascual

=== Transfers ===
In
Pos.	Name	from	Type
FW	Juan Sánchez	Celta Vigo	€4.2 million
DF	Mauricio Pellegrino	Velez Sarsfield	€1.2 million
MF	Kily González	Real Zaragoza	€2.5 million
MF	Gerard López	Alavés	loan ended
GK	Andrés Palop	Villarreal	Free
MF	David Albelda	Villarreal	loan ended
FW	Óscar	Barcelona	Free
MF	Gerardo	Villarreal	
DF	Fagiani	Newell's Old Boys	€1.8 million

Out
Pos.	Name	To	Type
MF	Stefan Schwarz	Sunderland	€6.0 million
DF	Juanfran	Celta Vigo	€2.0 million
MF	Gabriel Popescu	Numancia	
FW	Cristiano Lucarelli	Lecce	
FW	Rubén Navarro	Numancia	
DF	Óscar Téllez	Alavés	
FW	Sabin Ilie	National Bucuresti	loan
FW	Nicolás Olivera	Sevilla	
DF	Curro Torres	Recreativo	loan

==== Winter ====
In
Pos.	Name	from	Type

Out
Pos.	Name	To	Type
DF	Francisco Camarasa	Valencia B	
DF	Miguel Ángel Soria	Numancia	loan
MF	Dennis Serban	Villarreal	loan

== Competitions ==
=== La Liga ===
==== League table ====
Pos	Team	Pld	W	D	L	GF	GA	GD	Pts	Qualification or relegation
1	Deportivo La Coruña (C)	38	21	6	11	66	44	+22	69	Qualification for the Club World Cup and Champions League group stage
2	Barcelona	38	19	7	12	70	46	+24	64 (Note: VAL 3–1 BAR; BAR 3–0 VAL)	Qualification for the Champions League group stage
3	Valencia	38	18	10	10	59	39	+20	64	Qualification for the Champions League third qualifying round
4	Zaragoza	38	16	15	7	60	40	+20	63	Qualification for the UEFA Cup first round (Note: Real Madrid qualified directly for the 2000–01 UEFA Champions League as holders. As a result, Zaragoza lost their spot in the UEFA Champions League and had to participate in the UEFA Cup.)
5	Real Madrid	38	16	14	8	58	48	+10	62	Qualification for the Champions League group stage

Source: LFP
Rules for classification: 1) points; 2) head-to-head points; 3) head-to-head goal difference; 4) head-to-head goals scored; 5) goal difference; 6) number of goals scored.
(C) Champions

==== Results by round ====
Round	1	2	3	4	5	6	7	8	9	10	11	12	13	14	15	16	17	18	19	20	21	22	23	24	25	26	27	28	29	30	31	32	33	34	35	36	37	38
Ground	H	A	H	A	H	A	H	A	H	A	A	H	A	H	A	H	A	H	A	A	H	A	H	A	H	A	H	A	H	H	A	H	A	H	A	H	A	H
Result	L	L	L	L	D	W	W	L	W	D	L	W	D	W	W	W	D	D	L	D	L	W	W	D	D	W	W	L	D	W	L	W	W	W	W	W	D	W
Position	13	18	19	20	20	19	16	18	14	15	18	15	15	11	8	7	6	5	9	9	11	9	8	8	9	6	6	6	6	6	6	6	5	5	5	4	5	3

Source: Competitive Matches
A = Away; H = Home; W = Win; D = Draw; L = Loss; = 2000-01 UEFA Champions League group stage; = 2000-01 UEFA Champions League qualifying round; = 2000-01 UEFA Cup; = 2000 UEFA Intertoto Cup; = 2000-01 Segunda Division

==== Matches ====
20 August 1999 1	Valencia	1–2	Racing Santander	Valencia
	Gaizka Mendieta 75'	Report	22' (o.g.) Miroslav Đukić; 65' Salva	Stadium: Estadio Mestalla

28 August 1999 2	Espanyol	3–2	Valencia	Barcelona
	Benítez 10'; Enrique de Lucas 13'; Martín Posse 52'	Report	46' (pen.)Gaizka Mendieta; 90'Juan Sánchez	Stadium: Estadio Olímpico de Montjuic

10 September 1999 3	Valencia	0–2	Alavés	Valencia
		Report	84'Magno; 90'Martín Astudillo	Stadium: Estadio Mestalla

17 September 1999 4	Betis	1–0	Valencia	Sevilla
	Oli 26'	Report		Stadium: Estadio Benito Villamarin

24 September 1999 5	Valencia	0–0	Valladolid	Valencia
		Report		Stadium: Estadio Mestalla

2 October 1999 6	Real Madrid	2–3	Valencia	Madrid
	Fernando Morientes 46'; Fernando Morientes 65'	Report	11' (pen.)Gaizka Mendieta; 23'Gerard; 39'Claudio López	Stadium: Estadio Santiago Bernabéu

12 October 1999 7	Valencia	4–0	Numancia	Valencia
	Adrian Ilie 30'; Adrian Ilie 51'; Javier Farinós 68'; Javier Farinós 89'	Report		Stadium: Estadio Mestalla

15 October 1999 8	Athletic Bilbao	1–0	Valencia	Bilbao
	Ismael Urzaiz 9'	Report		Stadium: San Mamés

22 October 1999 9	Valencia	2–0	Deportivo	Valencia
	Kily González 27'; Gerard 86'	Report		Stadium: Mestalla

29 October 1999 10	Málaga	1–1	Valencia	Málaga
	Edgar 27'	Report	67' Claudio López	Stadium: La Rosaleda

6 November 1999 11	Mallorca	1–0	Valencia	Palma de Mallorca
	Diego Tristán 50'	Report	(yellow card) 65' Albelda; (yellow card) 69' Claudio López; (red card) Carboni	Stadium: Estadio Son Moix

19 November 1999 12	Valencia	3–1	Barcelona	Valencia
	Claudio López 32'; Adrian Ilie 36'; Gerard 90'	Report	45' Boudewijn Zenden	Stadium: Estadio Mestalla

27 November 1999 13	Real Oviedo	0–0	Valencia	Oviedo
		Report		Stadium: Carlos Tartiere

3 December 1999 14	Valencia	2–0	Sevilla	Valencia
	Juan Sánchez 6'; Claudio López 70'	Report		Stadium: Estadio Mestalla

11 December 1999 15	Atlético Madrid	1–2	Valencia	Madrid
	Jimmy Floyd Hasselbaink 28'	Report	16' Gaizka Mendieta; 54' Juan Sánchez	Stadium: Estadio Vicente Calderón

18 December 1999 16	Valencia	3–1	Rayo Vallecano	Valencia
	Juan Sánchez 12'; Juan Sánchez 75'; Gaizka Mendieta 90'	Report	70' Luis Cembranos	Stadium: Estadio Mestalla

21 December 1999 17	Real Sociedad	0–0	Valencia	San Sebastián
		Report		Stadium: Estadio Anoeta

3 January 2000 18	Valencia	1–1	Celta Vigo	Valencia
	Gerard 6'	Report	49' Velasco	Stadium: Estadio Mestalla

8 January 2000 19	Real Zaragoza	4–2	Valencia	Zaragoza
	Juanele 26'; Savo Milošević 32'; Vladislav Radimov 58'; Juanele 68'	Report	24' (pen.)Gaizka Mendieta; 66'Gaizka Mendieta	Stadium: Estadio La Romareda

15 January 2000 20	Racing Santander	1–1	Valencia	Santander
	Salva 90' (pen.)	Report	34' (pen.) Gaizka Mendieta	Stadium: El Sardinero

22 January 2000 21	Valencia	1–2	Espanyol	Valencia
	Kily González 29'	Report	15'Benítez; 52'Arteaga	Stadium: Mestalla

29 January 2000 22	Alavés	0–1	Valencia	Vitoria
		Report	70' (pen.) Javier Farinós	Stadium: Mendizorroza

4 February 2000 23	Valencia	3–1	Betis	Valencia
	Adrian Ilie 2'; Gaizka Mendieta 82' (pen.); Javier Farinós 83'	Report	60' Iulian Filipescu	Stadium: Estadio Mestalla

11 February 2000 24	Valladolid	0–0	Valencia	Valladolid
		Report		Stadium: Estadio Jose Zorrilla

19 February 2000 25	Valencia	1–1	Real Madrid	Valencia
	Adrian Ilie 35'	Report	59' Guti	Stadium: Estadio Mestalla

25 February 2000 26	Numancia	1–2	Valencia	Soria
	Miguel Ángel Soria 77'	Report	4' Gaizka Mendieta; 60' Claudio López	Stadium: Los Pajaritos

3 March 2000 27	Valencia	2–0	Athletic Bilbao	Valencia
	Óscar 83'; Claudio López 86'	Report		Stadium: Estadio Mestalla

11 March 2000 28	Deportivo	2–0	Valencia	La Coruña
	Fran 24'; Flávio Conceição 50'	Report		Stadium: Estadio Riazor

17 March 2000 29	Valencia	2–2	Málaga	Valencia
	Angulo 51'; Angulo 67'	Report	62' Catanha; 90' (pen.) Catanha	Stadium: Mestalla

24 March 2000 30	Valencia	1–0	Mallorca	Valencia
	Jocelyn Angloma 49'	Report		Stadium: Estadio Mestalla

1 April 2000 31	Barcelona	3–0	Valencia	Barcelona
	Winston Bogarde 63'; Patrick Kluivert 68'; Patrick Kluivert 90'	Report		Stadium: Camp Nou

8 April 2000 32	Valencia	6–2	Real Oviedo	Valencia
	Claudio López 18'; Frédéric Danjou 30' (o.g.); Claudio López 50'; Angulo 58'; Javier Farinós 61' (pen.); Óscar 83'	Report	65' Viktor Onopko; 85' Roberto Pompei	Stadium: Mestalla

14 April 2000 33	Sevilla	1–2	Valencia	Sevilla
	Jesuli 78'	Report	70'Gaizka Mendieta; 90' (o.g.) Marcelo Zalayeta	Stadium: Estadio Sanchez Pizjuan

21 April 2000 34	Valencia	2–0	Atlético Madrid	Valencia
	Claudio López 23'; Angulo 88'	Report		Stadium: Mestalla

28 April 2000 35	Rayo Vallecano	1–3	Valencia	Madrid
	Bolo 86'	Report	11'Javier Farinós; 36'Gaizka Mendieta; 82'Óscar	Stadium: Estadio Campo Vallecas

5 May 2000 36	Valencia	4–0	Real Sociedad	Valencia
	Angulo 18'; Claudio López 52'; Amedeo Carboni 79'; Gaizka Mendieta 89'	Report		Stadium: Estadio Mestalla

13 May 2000 37	Celta Vigo	0–0	Valencia	Vigo
		Report		Stadium: Estadio Balaídos

18 May 2000 38	Valencia	2–1	Real Zaragoza	Valencia
	Gary Sundgren 59' (o.g.); Claudio López 70'	Report	5' Savo Milošević	Stadium: Estadio Mestalla

=== Copa del Rey ===
Second round

14 December 1999	Osasuna	3–0	Valencia	Pamplona

11 January 2000	Valencia	2–0	Osasuna	Valencia
				Stadium: Estadio Mestalla

=== UEFA Champions League ===
==== Third qualifying round ====
11 August 1999	Valencia (Spain)	2–0	(Israel) Hapoel Haifa	Valencia
				Stadium: Mestalla

28 August 1999	Hapoel Haifa (Israel)	0–2	(Spain) Valencia	Haifa

==== First Group Stage ====
===== Group F =====
Pos	Team	Pld	W	D	L	GF	GA	GD	Pts	Qualification	VAL	BAY	RAN	PSV
1	(Spain) Valencia	6	3	3	0	8	4	+4	12	Advance to second group stage	—	1–1	2–0	1–0
2	(Germany) Bayern Munich	6	2	3	1	7	6	+1	9	Advance to second group stage	1–1	—	1–0	2–1
3	(Scotland) Rangers	6	2	1	3	7	7	0	7	Transfer to UEFA Cup	1–2	1–1	—	4–1
4	(Netherlands) PSV Eindhoven	6	1	1	4	5	10	−5	4		1–1	2–1	0–1	—

Source: UEFA

14 September 1999 1	Valencia (Spain)	2–0	(Scotland) Rangers	Valencia
	Moore 55' (o.g.); Kily González 76'	Report		Stadium: Mestalla; Attendance: 31,524; Referee: (Slovakia) Ľuboš Micheľ

22 September 1999 2	PSV Eindhoven (Netherlands)	1–1	(Spain) Valencia	Eindhoven
	van Nistelrooy 72' (pen.)	Report	4' C. López	Stadium: Philips Stadion; Attendance: 26,500; Referee: (Norway) Rune Pedersen

29 September 1999 3	Bayern Munich (Germany)	1–1	(Spain) Valencia	Munich
	Élber 6'	Report	80' G. López	Stadium: Olympic Stadium; Attendance: 31,000; Referee: (Italy) Graziano Cesari

20 October 1999 4	Valencia (Spain)	1–1	(Germany) Bayern Munich	Valencia
	Ilie 11'	Report	18' (pen.) Effenberg	Stadium: Mestalla; Attendance: 45,000; Referee: (Sweden) Anders Frisk

26 October 1999 5	Rangers (Scotland)	1–2	(Spain) Valencia	Glasgow
	Moore 60'	Report	35' Mendieta; 45' C. López	Stadium: Ibrox Stadium; Attendance: 50,063; Referee: (Austria) Günter Benkö

2 November 1999 6	Valencia (Spain)	1–0	(Netherlands) PSV Eindhoven	Valencia
	López 70'	Report		Stadium: Mestalla; Attendance: 26,266; Referee: (England) Graham Barber

==== Second Group Stage ====
===== Group B =====
Pos	Team	Pld	W	D	L	GF	GA	GD	Pts	Qualification	MUN	VAL	FIO	BOR
1	(England) Manchester United	6	4	1	1	10	4	+6	13	Advance to knockout stage	—	3–0	3–1	2–0
2	(Spain) Valencia	6	3	1	2	9	5	+4	10	Advance to knockout stage	0–0	—	2–0	3–0
3	(Italy) Fiorentina	6	2	2	2	7	8	−1	8		2–0	1–0	—	3–3
4	(France) Bordeaux	6	0	2	4	5	14	−9	2		1–2	1–4	0–0	—

Source: UEFA

23 November 1999 1	Valencia (Spain)	3–0	(France) Bordeaux	Valencia
	Farinós 60'; Ilie 68'; Kily González 90'			Stadium: Mestalla; Attendance: 35,000; Referee: (Netherlands) Dick Jol

8 December 1999 2	Manchester United (England)	3–0	(Spain) Valencia	Manchester
	Keane 38'; Solskjær 47'; Scholes 70'			Stadium: Old Trafford; Attendance: 54,606; Referee: (Denmark) Kim Milton Nielsen

1 March 2000 3	Fiorentina (Italy)	1–0	(Spain) Valencia	Florence
	Mijatović 20' (pen.)			Stadium: Stadio Artemio Franchi; Attendance: 30,000; Referee: (Germany) Markus Merk

7 March 2000 4	Valencia (Spain)	2–0	(Italy) Fiorentina	Valencia
	Ilie 35'; Mendieta 90+' (pen.)			Stadium: Mestalla; Attendance: 45,000; Referee: (Germany) Hellmut Krug

15 March 2000 5	Bordeaux (France)	1–4	(Spain) Valencia	Bordeaux
	Wiltord 54'		41' Đukić; 47' (pen.) Mendieta; 72' Kily González; 90+' Sánchez	Stadium: Parc Lescure; Attendance: 22,000; Referee: (Austria) Fritz Stuchlik

21 March 2000 6	Valencia (Spain)	0–0	(England) Manchester United	Valencia
				Stadium: Estadio Mestalla; Attendance: 40,419; Referee: (Slovakia) Ľuboš Micheľ

==== Knockout stage ====
===== Quarter-final =====
5 April 2000 1	Valencia (Spain)	5–2	(Italy) Lazio	Valencia
	Angulo 2'; G. López 4', 40', 80'; C. López 90+1'		28' Inzaghi; 87' Salas	Stadium: Estadio Mestalla; Attendance: 48,000; Referee: (Denmark) Kim Milton Nielsen

18 April 2000 2	Lazio (Italy)	1–0	(Spain) Valencia	Rome
	Verón 52'			Stadium: Stadio Olimpico; Attendance: 57,000; Referee: (Netherlands) Dick Jol

===== Semi-final =====
2 May 2000	Valencia (Spain)	4–1	(Spain) Barcelona	Valencia
	Angulo 10', 43'; Mendieta 47' (pen.); C. López 90+2'		Pellegrino 27' (o.g.)	Stadium: Estadio Mestalla; Attendance: 48,000; Referee: Urs Meier (Switzerland)

10 May 2000	Barcelona (Spain)	2–1	(Spain) Valencia	Barcelona
	F. de Boer 78'; Cocu 90+2'		Mendieta 69'	Stadium: Camp Nou; Attendance: 65,000; Referee: Vítor Melo Pereira (Portugal)

===== Final =====
24 May 2000	Real Madrid (Spain)	3–0	(Spain) Valencia	Saint-Denis
20:45	Morientes 39'; McManaman 67'; Raúl 75'			Stadium: Stade de France; Attendance: 78,759; Referee: Stefano Braschi (Italy)

== Statistics ==
=== Player statistics ===
No.	Pos	Nat	Player	Total		La Liga		Copa del Rey		Champions League	
No.	Pos	Nat	Player	Apps	Goals	Apps	Goals	Apps	Goals	Apps	Goals
1	GK	(Spain) ESP	Santiago Cañizares	38	-40	23	-26	2	-3	13	-11
20	DF	(France) FRA	Jocelyn Angloma	46	1	30	1	0	0	16	0
5	DF	(Federal Republic of Yugoslavia) YUG	Miroslav Đukić	51	1	33	0	2	0	15+1	1
2	DF	(Argentina) ARG	Mauricio Pellegrino	50	1	33	1	0	0	17	0
15	DF	(Italy) ITA	Amedeo Carboni	44	1	27+1	1	1	0	15	0
6	MF	(Spain) ESP	Gaizka Mendieta	51	19	31+2	13	2	1	16	5
8	MF	(Spain) ESP	Javier Farinós	53	8	25+9	5	2	1	14+3	2
14	MF	(Spain) ESP	Gerard López	52	8	32+1	4	1	0	16+2	4
18	MF	(Argentina) ARG	Kily González	49	6	28+3	2	1	0	16+1	4
17	FW	(Spain) ESP	Juan Sánchez	49	8	23+9	5	1+1	0	8+7	3
7	FW	(Argentina) ARG	Claudio López	54	17	32+2	11	2	0	18	6
25	GK	(Spain) ESP	Andrés Palop	22	-20	15	-13	0	0	6+1	-7
10	MF	(Spain) ESP	Miguel Angulo	48	8	19+10	5	1	0	11+7	3
11	FW	(Romania) ROU	Adrian Ilie	35	8	15+7	5	1	0	7+5	3
3	DF	(Sweden) SWE	Joachim Björklund	34	0	14+9	0	2	0	8+1	0
23	MF	(Spain) ESP	David Albelda	33	0	14+7	0	1	0	7+4	0
21	MF	(Spain) ESP	Luis Milla	14	0	9+3	0	0	0	2	0
22	DF	(Spain) ESP	Gerardo	13	0	5+5	0	1	0	1+1	0
24	DF	(Argentina) ARG	Daniel Fagiani	11	0	5+3	0	1	0	2	0
9	AM	(Spain) ESP	Óscar	29	4	3+17	4	1	0	1+7	0
12	DF	(Spain) ESP	Soria	4	0	1+2	0	0+1	0		
16	DF	(France) FRA	Alain Roche	2	0	1+1	0				
19	FW	(Croatia) CRO	Goran Vlaović	7	0	0+4	0	0+2	0	0+1	0
22	FW	(Romania) ROU	Dennis Serban	1	0	0+1	0				
13	GK	(Spain) ESP	Jorge Bartual	0	0	0	0	0	0	0	0
27	MF	(Spain) ESP	Curro Montoya								

- Source: https://www.bdfutbol.com/en/t/t1999-0036.html
