= 2000–01 Valencia CF season =

Valencia CF
2000–01 season
- President: Pedro Cortés
- Manager: Héctor Cúper
- Stadium: Mestalla
- La Liga: 5th
- Copa del Rey: Second round
- Champions League: Runners-up
- Top goalscorer: Juan Sánchez (12)
Home colours	Away colours	Third colours

Valencia CF once again reached the Champions League final. They finished 5th in La Liga, due to a 3-2 defeat to Barcelona courtesy of a hat trick from Rivaldo, and missed out on the Champions League for the following season. Valencia focused most of its resources on the international competition, a late goal from new signing John Carew helping them knock Arsenal out of the tournament in the quarter finals. The semis consisted of going against Leeds United, not present at that level for more than 25 years. Winning 3–0 at home following the goalless draw in the first match, Los Che became one of the relatively few clubs reaching consecutive finals, facing Bayern Munich.

In the final itself, Valencia got a penalty kick straightaway, which was converted by captain Gaizka Mendieta. A few minutes later Mehmet Scholl failed to convert a penalty, which Santiago Cañizares saved, but Stefan Effenberg later scored from a second penalty kick. The penalty taking was not over, since the result was 1-1 after extra time, and Bayern got the upper hand in the shootout, with Valencia coming agonizingly close to becoming the third Spanish club to win the Champions League.

Following the end of the season, Gaizka Mendieta was sold to Lazio for a club-record fee. Coach Héctor Cúper was recruited by Inter to break their title drought, being replaced by surprise choice Rafael Benítez.

== Players ==
=== Squad information ===
Note: Flags indicate national team as defined under FIFA eligibility rules; some limited exceptions apply. Players may hold more than one non-FIFA nationality.

No.	Pos.	Nation	Player
1	GK	ESP	Santiago Cañizares
2	DF	ARG	Mauricio Pellegrino
3	DF	SWE	Joachim Björklund
4	MF	FRA	Didier Deschamps
5	MF	YUG	Miroslav Đukić
6	MF	ESP	Gaizka Mendieta (captain)
7	FW	NOR	John Carew
8	MF	SVN	Zlatko Zahovic
9	FW	URU	Diego Alonso
10	MF	ESP	Angulo
11	FW	ROU	Adrian Ilie
12	DF	ARG	Roberto Ayala
13	GK	ESP	Jorge Bartual

No.	Pos.	Nation	Player
14	MF	ESP	Vicente
15	DF	ITA	Amedeo Carboni
16	DF	BRA	Fábio Aurélio
17	FW	ESP	Juan Sánchez
18	MF	ARG	Kily González
19	MF	ESP	Rubén Baraja
20	DF	FRA	Jocelyn Angloma
21	MF	ESP	Luis Milla
22	MF	ARG	Pablo Aimar
23	MF	ESP	David Albelda
25	GK	ESP	Andrés Palop
29	GK	ESP	Jonathan

=== Transfers ===
In
Pos.	Name	from	Type
MF	Ruben Baraja	Atletico Madrid	€ 10.8 million
FW	John Carew	Rosenborg BK	€ 8.5 million
MF	Didier Deschamps	Chelsea F.C.	€3.50 million
MF	Zlatko Zahovic	Olympiacos	€ 8.0 million
FW	Diego Alonso	Gimnasia y Esgrima	€7.65 million
DF	Roberto Ayala	AC Milan	€ 5.00 million
MF	Vicente	Levante UD	€ 4.80 million
MF	Pablo Aimar	River Plate	€ 21.25 million
DF	Fabio Aurelio	São Paulo FC	
FW	Mista	CD Tenerife	Free
DF	Curro Torres	Recreativo Huelva	loan ended

Out
Pos.	Name	To	Type
MF	Gerard	FC Barcelona	€ 21.60 million
MF	Francisco Javier Farinós	Internazionale	€ 16.25 million
FW	Claudio Lopez	SS Lazio	€ 23.0 million
FW	Oscar Garcia	RCD Espanyol	
DF	Daniel Fagiani	Boca Juniors	
FW	Goran Vlaovic	Panathinaikos	
DF	Soria	CD Numancia	
DF	Dennis Serban	Elche CF	
DF	Camarasa		
FW	Mista	CD Tenerife	loan
DF	Curro Torres	CD Tenerife	loan
DF	Alain Roche	Girondins Bordeaux	

=== Left club during season ===
Note: Flags indicate national team as defined under FIFA eligibility rules; some limited exceptions apply. Players may hold more than one non-FIFA nationality.

No.	Pos.	Nation	Player
13	GK	ESP	Jorge Bartual (to Tenerife)
16	DF	PAR	Ángel Amarilla (on loan to Getafe)
22	MF	ESP	Líbero Parri (on loan to Elche)

No.	Pos.	Nation	Player
24	MF	ESP	Gerardo (on loan to Osasuna)
27	DF	ESP	Curro Montoya (to Numancia)

== Competitions ==
=== La Liga ===
==== League table ====
Pos	Team	Pld	W	D	L	GF	GA	GD	Pts	Qualification or relegation
3	Mallorca	38	20	11	7	61	43	+18	71	Qualification for the Champions League third qualifying round
4	Barcelona	38	17	12	9	80	57	+23	63 (Note: VAL 0–1 BAR; BAR 3–2 VAL)	Qualification for the Champions League third qualifying round
5	Valencia	38	18	9	11	55	34	+21	63	Qualification for the UEFA Cup first round
6	Celta Vigo	38	16	11	11	51	49	+2	59	Qualification for the UEFA Cup first round
7	Villarreal	38	16	9	13	58	52	+6	57	

Source: LFP
Rules for classification: 1st points; 2nd head-to-head points; 3rd head-to-head goal difference; 4th head-to-head goals scored; 5th goal difference; 6th number of goals scored; 7th Fair-play points

==== Results by round ====
Round	1	2	3	4	5	6	7	8	9	10	11	12	13	14	15	16	17	18	19	20	21	22	23	24	25	26	27	28	29	30	31	32	33	34	35	36	37	38
Ground	A	H	A	H	A	H	A	H	A	H	A	H	A	H	H	A	H	A	H	H	A	H	A	H	A	H	A	H	A	H	A	H	A	A	H	A	H	A
Result	L	W	W	W	D	W	W	W	L	D	D	W	D	W	W	D	W	L	L	L	D	W	W	W	D	W	L	L	W	L	D	W	W	L	W	D	L	L
Position	15	6	4	2	2	1	1	1	1	1	1	1	3	2	2	2	2	2	4	4	4	4	3	3	3	3	3	3	3	3	3	3	3	3	3	4	4	5

Source: Competitive Matches
A = Away; H = Home; W = Win; D = Draw; L = Loss; = 2001-02 UEFA Champions League group stage; = 2001-02 UEFA Champions League qualifying round; = 2001-02 UEFA Cup; = 2001-02 Segunda Division

==== Matches ====
8 September 2000 1	Real Madrid	2–1	Valencia	Madrid
	Raúl 78'; Luís Figo 85'	Report	Gaizka Mendieta 76' (pen.)	Stadium: Estadio Santiago Bernabéu

15 September 2000 2	Valencia	4–0	Mallorca	Valencia
	Gaizka Mendieta 30'; Gaizka Mendieta 50'; Vicente 63'; Juan Sánchez 69'	Report		Stadium: Estadio Mestalla

23 September 2000 3	Numancia	0–3	Valencia	Soria
		Report	Juan Sánchez 76'; Juan Sánchez 83'; Vicente 85'	Stadium: Los Pajaritos

30 September 2000 4	Valencia	5–1	Las Palmas	Valencia
	Juan Sánchez 22'; Zlatko Zahovič 25'; Juan Sánchez 60'; John Carew 64'; Vicente 90'	Report	Thordur Gudjonsson 83'	Stadium: Estadio Mestalla

13 October 2000 5	Villarreal	1–1	Valencia	Villarreal
	Moisés 65'	Report	Juan Sánchez 59'	Stadium: El Madrigal

20 October 2000 6	Valencia	1–0	Real Zaragoza	Valencia
	Gaizka Mendieta 84'	Report		Stadium: Estadio Mestalla

28 October 2000 7	Osasuna	1–2	Valencia	Pamplona
	José Manuel Mateo 6'	Report	César Cruchaga 18' (o.g.); John Carew 85'	Stadium: El Sadar

31 October 2000 8	Valencia	1–0	Celta Vigo	Valencia
	John Carew 66'	Report		Stadium: Estadio Mestalla

3 November 2000 9	Espanyol	1–0	Valencia	Barcelona
	José Manuel Serrano 87'	Report		Stadium: Estadi Olímpic Lluís Companys

11 November 2000 10	Valencia	2–2	Rayo Vallecano	Valencia
	Gaizka Mendieta 62'; Diego Alonso 90'	Report	Elvir Bolić 24'; Míchel 53'	Stadium: Estadio Mestalla

17 November 2000 11	Alavés	1–1	Valencia	Vitoria
	Iván Alonso 67'	Report	John Carew 78'	Stadium: Mendizorroza

25 November 2000 12	Valencia	2–0	Real Oviedo	Valencia
	Gaizka Mendieta 51' (pen.); Kily González 64'	Report		Stadium: Estadio Mestalla

1 December 2000 13	Valladolid	0–0	Valencia	Valladolid
		Report		Stadium: Estadio Jose Zorrilla

8 December 2000 14	Valencia	2–0	Real Sociedad	Valencia
	John Carew 67'; Juan Sánchez 88'	Report		Stadium: Estadio Mestalla

16 December 2000 15	Valencia	2–0	Málaga	Valencia
	John Carew 42'; Rubén Baraja 73'	Report		Stadium: Estadio Mestalla

19 December 2000 16	Athletic Bilbao	1–1	Valencia	Bilbao
	Josu Urrutia 14'	Report	John Carew 85'	Stadium: San Mamés

6 January 2001 17	Valencia	1–0	Racing Santander	Valencia
	John Carew 45'	Report		Stadium: Estadio Mestalla

12 January 2001 18	Deportivo	2–0	Valencia	La Coruña
	Walter Pandiani 89'; Roy Makaay 90'	Report		Stadium: Estadio Riazor

19 January 2001 19	Valencia	0–1	Barcelona	Valencia
		Report	Frank de Boer 7'	Stadium: Estadio Mestalla

27 January 2001 20	Valencia	0–1	Real Madrid	Valencia
		Report	Raúl 82'	Stadium: Estadio Mestalla

3 February 2001 21	Mallorca	2–2	Valencia	Palma de Mallorca
	Samuel Eto'o 17'; Albert Luque 90'	Report	Rubén Baraja 68'; Gaizka Mendieta 75'	Stadium: Estadio Son Moix

9 February 2001 22	Valencia	3–0	Numancia	Valencia
	Juan Sánchez 17'; Gaizka Mendieta 41'; Diego Alonso 80'	Report		Stadium: Estadio Mestalla

16 February 2001 23	Las Palmas	0–2	Valencia	Las Palmas de Gran Canaria
		Report	Juan Sánchez 18'; Pablo Aimar 88'	Stadium: Estadio Insular

24 February 2001 24	Valencia	3–1	Villarreal	Valencia
	Carew 18'; Carew 47'; Carew 84'	Report	Quique Álvarez 35'	Stadium: Estadio Mestalla

2 March 2001 25	Real Zaragoza	1–1	Valencia	Zaragoza
	Esnaider 5'	Report	Mendieta 70' (pen.)	Stadium: La Romareda

9 March 2001 26	Valencia	1–0	Osasuna	Valencia
	Kily González 78'	Report		Stadium: Mestalla

17 March 2001 27	Celta Vigo	3–2	Valencia	Vigo
	Valery Karpin 51' (pen.); Valery Karpin 60' (pen.); Valery Karpin 65'	Report	Juan Sánchez 31'; Vágner 89' (o.g.)	Stadium: Estadio Balaídos

30 March 2001 28	Valencia	0–1	Espanyol	Valencia
		Report	Raúl Tamudo 52'	Stadium: Estadio Mestalla

6 April 2001 29	Rayo Vallecano	1–4	Valencia	Madrid
	Luis Cembranos 77'	Report	Roberto Ayala 43'; Kily González 49'; Vicente 73'; Juan Sánchez 85'	Stadium: Vallecas

13 April 2001 30	Valencia	1–2	Alavés	Valencia
	Vicente 15'	Report	Gaizka Mendieta 7' (o.g.); Dan Eggen 74'	Stadium: Estadio Mestalla

21 April 2001 31	Real Oviedo	0–0	Valencia	Oviedo
		Report		Stadium: Estadio Carlos Tartiere

27 April 2001 32	Valencia	1–0	Valladolid	Valencia
	Juan Sánchez 64'	Report		Stadium: Estadio Mestalla

4 May 2001 33	Real Sociedad	1–2	Valencia	San Sebastián
	Aranzábal 75' (pen.)	Report	Zlatko Zahovič 67'; Pablo Aimar 83'	Stadium: Estadio Anoeta

12 May 2001 34	Málaga	3–0	Valencia	Málaga
	Julio Dely Valdés 22'; Julio Dely Valdés 39'; Julio Dely Valdés 77' (pen.)	Report		Stadium: La Rosaleda

17 May 2001 35	Valencia	1–0	Athletic Bilbao	Valencia
	Zlatko Zahovič 90'	Report		Stadium: Estadio Mestalla

26 May 2001 36	Racing Santander	1–1	Valencia	Santander
	Javier Mazzoni 49'	Report	Gaizka Mendieta 90'	Stadium: Estadio El Sardinero

9 June 2001 37	Valencia	0–1	Deportivo	Valencia
		Report	Roy Makaay 69'	Stadium: Estadio Mestalla

16 June 2001 38	Barcelona	3–2	Valencia	Barcelona
	Rivaldo 4'; Rivaldo 45'; Rivaldo 89'	Report	Rubén Baraja 25'; Rubén Baraja 47'	Stadium: Camp Nou

=== Copa del Rey ===
==== Round of 64 ====
12 December 2000	UDA Gramenet	0–1	Valencia	Barcelona
		Report	Angulo 7'	Stadium: Estadio Narcís Sala; Attendance: 10 500

==== Round of 32 ====
3 January 2001	Guadix CF	4–4 (6-5 p)	Valencia CF	Guadix
	Carlos Pollo 19'; Pichi 31'; Samuel 40'; Samuel 62'	Report	Vicente 45'; Ruben Baraja 46'; Zahovic 87'; Zahovic 92' (pen.)	Stadium: Municipal de Guadix; Referee: Carmona Mendez

=== UEFA Champions League ===
==== Qualifying ====
9 August 2000	Tirol Innsbruck (Austria)	0–0	(Spain) Valencia	Tivoli, Innsbruck
20:30 (CET)		Report		Attendance: 6,615; Referee: Mike Riley (England)

23 August 2000	Valencia (Spain)	4–1	(Austria) Tirol Innsbruck	Mestalla Stadium, Valencia
22:00 (CET)	Mendieta 23' (pen.), 52'; Diego Alonso 44', 62'	Report	Gilewicz 66'	Attendance: 43,700; Referee: Domenico Messina (Italy)

==== 1st Group Stage ====
Pos	Team	Pld	W	D	L	GF	GA	GD	Pts	Qualification	VAL	LYO	OLY	HVN
1	(Spain) Valencia	6	4	1	1	7	4	+3	13	Advance to second group stage	—	1–0	2–1	1–1
2	(France) Lyon	6	3	0	3	8	6	+2	9	Advance to second group stage	1–2	—	1–0	3–1
3	(Greece) Olympiacos	6	3	0	3	6	5	+1	9	Transfer to UEFA Cup	1–0	2–1	—	2–0
4	(Netherlands) Heerenveen	6	1	1	4	3	9	−6	4		0–1	0–2	1–0	—

Source: UEFA

12 September 2000 1	Valencia (Spain)	2–1	(Greece) Olympiacos	Mestalla Stadium, Valencia
20:45	Baraja 36'; Diego Alonso 45'	Report	Đorđević 74'	Attendance: 30,725; Referee: Anders Frisk (Sweden)

20 September 2000 2	Heerenveen (Netherlands)	0–1	(Spain) Valencia	Abe Lenstra Stadion, Heerenveen
20:45		Report	González 38'	Attendance: 14,300; Referee: Valentin Ivanov (Russia)

27 September 2000 3	Valencia (Spain)	1–0	(France) Lyon	Mestalla Stadium, Valencia
20:45	Zahovič 78'	Report		Attendance: 30,525; Referee: Stefano Braschi (Italy)

17 October 2000 4	Lyon (France)	1–2	(Spain) Valencia	Stade de Gerland, Lyon
20:45	Marlet 90'	Report	Juan Sánchez 45+1'; Baraja 86'	Attendance: 38,950; Referee: Paul Durkin (England)

25 October 2000 5	Olympiacos (Greece)	1–0	(Spain) Valencia	Spiros Louis Olympic Stadium, Athens
20:45	Đorđević 65' (pen.)	Report		Attendance: 50,350; Referee: Alfredo Trentalange (Italy)

7 November 2000 6	Valencia (Spain)	1–1	(Netherlands) Heerenveen	Mestalla Stadium, Valencia
20:45	Diego Alonso 10'	Report	Venema 37'	Attendance: 19,075; Referee: Michel Piraux (Belgium)

==== 2nd Group Stage ====
Pos	Team	Pld	W	D	L	GF	GA	GD	Pts	Qualification	VAL	MUN	STM	PAN
1	(Spain) Valencia	6	3	3	0	10	2	+8	12	Advance to knockout stage	—	0–0	2–0	2–1
2	(England) Manchester United	6	3	3	0	10	3	+7	12	Advance to knockout stage	1–1	—	3–0	3–1
3	(Austria) Sturm Graz	6	2	0	4	4	13	−9	6		0–5	0–2	—	2–0
4	(Greece) Panathinaikos	6	0	2	4	4	10	−6	2		0–0	1–1	1–2	—

Source: UEFA

21 November 2000 1	Valencia (Spain)	2–0	(Austria) Sturm Graz	Valencia
20:45	Carew 45'; Juan Sánchez 47'	Report		Stadium: Mestalla Stadium; Attendance: 26,150; Referee: (Denmark) Kim Milton Nielsen

6 December 2000 2	Panathinaikos (Greece)	0–0	(Spain) Valencia	Athens
20:45		Report		Stadium: Spiros Louis Olympic Stadium; Attendance: 42,050; Referee: (Germany) Markus Merk

14 February 2001 3	Valencia (Spain)	0–0	(England) Manchester United	Valencia
20:45		Report		Stadium: Mestalla Stadium; Attendance: 49,450; Referee: (Netherlands) Dick Jol

20 February 2001 4	Manchester United (England)	1–1	(Spain) Valencia	Manchester
20:45	Cole 12'	Report	Brown 87' (o.g.)	Stadium: Old Trafford; Attendance: 66,715; Referee: (Germany) Hellmut Krug

7 March 2001 5	Sturm Graz (Austria)	0–5	(Spain) Valencia	Graz
20:45		Report	Ayala 5'; Carew 50'; Kily González 60'; Diego Alonso 88', 90+1'	Stadium: Arnold-Schwarzenegger-Stadion; Attendance: 16,200; Referee: (Italy) Stefano Braschi

13 March 2001 6	Valencia (Spain)	2–1	(Greece) Panathinaikos	Valencia
20:45	Juan Sánchez 39'; Angloma 75'	Report	Basinas 28' (pen.)	Stadium: Mestalla Stadium; Attendance: 40,000; Referee: (Denmark) Knud Erik Fisker

==== Quarter-final ====
4 April 2001	Arsenal (England)	2–1	(Spain) Valencia	London
20:45	Henry 58'; Parlour 60'	Report	Ayala 41'	Stadium: Highbury; Attendance: 35,104; Referee: (Netherlands) Dick Jol

17 April 2001	Valencia (Spain)	1–0 (2 (a) –2 agg.)	(England) Arsenal	Valencia
20:45	Carew 75'	Report		Stadium: Mestalla Stadium; Attendance: 47,700; Referee: (Denmark) Kim Milton Nielsen

==== Semi-finals ====
2 May 2001	Leeds United (England)	0–0	(Spain) Valencia	Leeds
20:45 CET (UTC+1)		Report		Stadium: Elland Road; Attendance: 36,437; Referee: (Italy) Pierluigi Collina

8 May 2001	Valencia (Spain)	3–0 (3–0 agg.)	(England) Leeds United	Valencia
20:45 CET (UTC+1)	Juan Sánchez 16', 47'; Mendieta 52'	Report		Stadium: Mestalla Stadium, Attendance: 53,200; Referee: (Switzerland) Urs Meier

==== Final ====
23 May 2001	Bayern Munich (Germany)	1–1 (a.e.t.) (5–4 p)	(Spain) Valencia	Milan
20:45 CEST	Effenberg 50' (pen.)	Report	Mendieta 3' (pen.)	Stadium: San Siro; Attendance: 79,000; Referee: (Netherlands) Dick Jol
	Penalties
	Paulo Sérgio (penalty missed); Salihamidžić (penalty scored); Zickler (penalty scored); Andersson (penalty missed); Effenberg (penalty scored); Lizarazu (penalty scored); Linke (penalty scored)		(penalty scored) Mendieta; (penalty scored) Carew; (penalty missed) Zahovič; (penalty missed) Carboni; (penalty scored) Baraja; (penalty scored) Kily González; (penalty missed) Pellegrino

== Statistics ==
=== Players statistics ===
No.	Pos	Nat	Player	Total		La Liga		Copa del Rey		Champions League	
No.	Pos	Nat	Player	Apps	Goals	Apps	Goals	Apps	Goals	Apps	Goals
1	GK	(Spain) ESP	Cañizares	55	-43	37	-34	0	0	18	-9
20	DF	(France) FRA	Angloma	46	1	27	0	1	0	17+1	1
5	DF	(Federal Republic of Yugoslavia) YUG	Djukic	47	0	29+5	0	1	0	10+2	0
12	DF	(Argentina) ARG	Ayala	39	3	27+1	1	2	0	9	2
2	DF	(Argentina) ARG	Pellegrino	46	0	24+3	0	1	0	18	0
15	DF	(Italy) ITA	Carboni	39	0	24	0	1	0	14	0
6	MF	(Spain) ESP	Mendieta	47	14	31	10	0	0	16	4
19	MF	(Spain) ESP	Baraja	52	7	34+1	4	2	1	15	2
18	MF	(Argentina) ARG	Kily González	36	5	19+3	3	0	0	14	2
7	FW	(Norway) NOR	Carew	57	14	32+5	11	2	0	11+7	3
17	FW	(Spain) ESP	Sánchez	49	17	26+6	12	2	0	11+4	5
25	GK	(Spain) ESP	Palop	4	-5	1	0	2	-4	1	-1
14	MF	(Spain) ESP	Vicente	49	6	20+13	5	2	1	5+9	0
10	MF	(Spain) ESP	Angulo	40	1	20+8	0	2	1	7+3	0
23	MF	(Spain) ESP	Albelda	34	0	15+6	0	0	0	8+5	0
3	DF	(Sweden) SWE	Björklund	16	0	9+1	0	1	0	4+1	0
8	MF	(Slovenia) SVN	Zahovic	31	6	8+12	3	1	2	5+5	1
22	MF	(Argentina) ARG	Aimar	18	2	8+2	2	0	0	6+2	0
4	MF	(France) FRA	Deschamps	21	0	7+6	0	1	0	6+1	0
16	DF	(Brazil) BRA	Fábio Aurélio	9	0	7	0	1	0	1	0
9	FW	(Uruguay) URU	Alonso	33	8	6+14	2	1	0	8+4	6
11	FW	(Romania) ROU	Ilie	13	0	4+6	0	1	0	1+1	0
21	MF	(Spain) ESP	Milla	12	0	3+3	0	2	0	1+3	0
24	DF	(Spain) ESP	Gerardo	2	0	1	0	0	0	1	0
13	GK	(Spain) ESP	Bartual	0	0	0	0	0	0	0	0

== Sources ==
- Soccerbase - Valencia CF
