= 1998–99 Valencia CF season =

Valencia
1998–99 season
- President: Pedro Cortés
- Manager: Claudio Ranieri
- Stadium: Mestalla
- La Liga: 4th
- Copa del Rey: Winners
- UEFA Cup: Second round
- Top goalscorer: Claudio López (21)
Home colours	Away colours

Valencia had a successful season, finishing in the top four of La Liga, and thus qualifying for the UEFA Champions League for the first time in almost thirty years, thanks to the extension of the competition to include more teams from the top leagues. Valencia also won the Copa del Rey, ending a long trophy drought and marking a successful end to Italian coach Claudio Ranieri's first spell at the club. Among the main players behind the success included Gaizka Mendieta, Javier Farinós and lethal striker Claudio López.

At the end of the season, Ranieri left to manage Atlético Madrid; he was replaced by Argentine Héctor Cúper, who had led Mallorca to third place and the Cup Winners' Cup final.

== Squad ==
Squad at end of season

Note: Flags indicate national team as defined under FIFA eligibility rules; some limited exceptions apply. Players may hold more than one non-FIFA nationality.

No.	Pos.	Nation	Player
1	GK	ESP	Santiago Cañizares
2	DF	ESP	Javi Navarro
3	DF	ESP	Juanfran
4	DF	ESP	Paco Camarasa
5	DF	YUG	Miroslav Đukić
6	MF	ESP	Gaizka Mendieta
7	FW	ARG	Claudio López
8	MF	ESP	Javier Farinós
9	FW	ITA	Cristiano Lucarelli
10	MF	SWE	Stefan Schwarz
11	FW	ROU	Adrian Ilie
12	FW	ARG	Guillermo Morigi
13	GK	ESP	Jorge Bartual
14	DF	SWE	Joachim Björklund
15	DF	ITA	Amedeo Carboni
16	DF	FRA	Alain Roche

No.	Pos.	Nation	Player
17	DF	ROU	Sabin Ilie
18	MF	ROU	Gabriel Popescu
19	FW	CRO	Goran Vlaović
20	DF	FRA	Jocelyn Angloma
21	MF	ESP	Luis Milla
22	MF	ROU	Dennis Şerban
23	MF	ESP	Angulo
24	MF	ESP	Oscar Tellez
25	DF	ESP	Miguel Ángel Soria
26	GK	ESP	Jonathan
27	MF	ESP	Curro Torres
28	MF	ESP	Porras
29	FW	ESP	Pérez
30	FW	ESP	Rubén Navarro
31	FW	ESP	Jandro
32	MF	ESP	Soto

=== Transfers ===
In
Pos.	Name	from	Type
GK	Santiago Cañizares	Real Madrid	
DF	Alain Roche	Paris Saint-Germain	
DF	Joachim Björklund	Rangers	
MF	Stefan Schwarz	Fiorentina	
MF	Gabriel Popescu	Salamanca	
FW	Cristiano Lucarelli	Atalanta	
MF	Dennis Serban	Steaua București	
DF	Oscar Tellez	Alavés	
MF	Sabin Ilie	Kocaelispor	

Out
Pos.	Name	To	Type
GK	Andoni Zubizarreta		retired
MF	Fernando	Wolverhampton	
FW	Ariel Ortega	Sampdoria	€2.60 million
DF	Fernando Cáceres	Celta Vigo	
GK	Gustavo Campagnuolo	San Lorenzo	
DF	Moussa Saib	Tottenham Hotspur	€4.00 million
MF	José del Solar	Beşiktaş	
MF	Gerard López	Alavés	loan
MF	Marcelinho Carioca	Corinthians	
MF	David Albelda	Villarreal	loan
DF	Oscar Tellez	Villarreal	loan
FW	Nicolás Olivera	Sevilla	
MF	Sabin Ilie	Lleida	loan

=== Left club during season ===
Note: Flags indicate national team as defined under FIFA eligibility rules; some limited exceptions apply. Players may hold more than one non-FIFA nationality.

No.	Pos.	Nation	Player
12	MF	ARG	Guillermo Morigi (to Vélez Sársfield)
17	FW	ROU	Sabin Ilie (on loan to Lleida)

No.	Pos.	Nation	Player
24	DF	ESP	Óscar Téllez (to Villarreal)

== Competitions ==
=== La Liga ===
==== League table ====
Pos	Team	Pld	W	D	L	GF	GA	GD	Pts	Qualification or relegation
2	Real Madrid	38	21	5	12	77	62	+15	68	Qualification for the Champions League group stage
3	Mallorca	38	20	6	12	48	31	+17	66	Qualification for the Champions League third qualifying round
4	Valencia	38	19	8	11	63	39	+24	65	Qualification for the Champions League third qualifying round
5	Celta Vigo	38	17	13	8	69	41	+28	64	Qualification for the UEFA Cup first round
6	Deportivo La Coruña	38	17	12	9	55	43	+12	63	Qualification for the UEFA Cup first round

Source: LFP
Rules for classification: 1) points; 2) head-to-head points; 3) head-to-head goal difference; 4) head-to-head goals scored; 5) goal difference; 6) number of goals scored.

==== Results by round ====
Round	1	2	3	4	5	6	7	8	9	10	11	12	13	14	15	16	17	18	19	20	21	22	23	24	25	26	27	28	29	30	31	32	33	34	35	36	37	38
Ground	A	H	A	H	A	H	A	H	A	H	A	H	A	H	A	H	H	A	H	H	A	H	A	H	A	H	A	H	A	H	A	H	A	H	A	A	H	A
Result	W	L	W	L	L	L	W	W	W	L	W	D	W	W	L	W	D	D	W	W	D	L	L	W	W	W	D	W	D	W	D	W	W	L	D	W	L	W
Position	4	9	6	9	13	16	12	6	5	5	5	7	5	4	4	4	4	5	3	2	4	4	5	3	2	2	3	2	3	4	6	5	3	5	6	5	6	4

Source: https://www.worldfootball.net/competition/ro11027/md38/results-and-standings/
A = Away; H = Home; W = Win; D = Draw; L = Loss; = Leader, 1999–2000 UEFA Champions League group stage; = 1999–2000 UEFA Champions League group stage; = 1999–2000 UEFA Champions League qualifying round; = 1999–2000 UEFA Cup; = 1999 UEFA Intertoto Cup; = 1999–2000 Segunda División

==== Matches ====
28 August 1998 1	Valencia	1-0	Atlético Madrid	Valencia
	Angulo 65'	Report		Stadium: Mestalla

11 September 1998 2	Deportivo	1-0	Valencia	La Coruña
	Schürrer 4'	Report		Stadium: Riazor

19 September 1998 3	Valencia	1-0	Villarreal	Valencia
	Angulo 45'	Report		Stadium: Mestalla

25 September 1998 4	Valladolid	3-1	Valencia	Valladolid
	Peternac 35'; Javi Torres 37'; Alberto Marcos 88'	Report	Angulo 31'	Stadium: Estadio Jose Zorrilla

2 October 1998 5	Valencia	1-3	Barcelona	Valencia
	Piojo López 14'	Report	Kluivert 55'; Rivaldo 73'; Anderson 90'	Stadium: Mestalla

16 October 1998 6	Athletic Bilbao	2-0	Valencia	Bilbao
	Urzaiz 27'; Guerrero 51'	Report		Stadium: San Mamés

24 October 1998 7	Valencia	5-1	Betis	Valencia
	Piojo López 29'; Ilie 42'; Schwarz 67'; Piojo López 73'; Ilie 82'	Report	Alexis 33'	Stadium: Mestalla

30 October 1998 8	Real Zaragoza	1-4	Valencia	Zaragoza
	Kily González 24'	Report	Ilie 3'; Lucarelli 68'; Schwarz 78'; Mendieta 85'	Stadium: La Romareda

7 November 1998 9	Valencia	3-0	Racing Santander	Valencia
	Djukic 46'; Schwarz 47'; Piojo López 62'	Report		Stadium: Mestalla

14 November 1998 10	Extremadura	1-0	Valencia	Almendralejo
	Toril 60'	Report		Stadium: Francisco de la Hera

20 November 1998 11	Valencia	3-1	Real Madrid	Valencia
	Angulo 35'; Claudio López 62'; Claudio López 74'	Report	Sávio 57'	Stadium: Mestalla

28 November 1998 12	Celta Vigo	2-2	Valencia	Vigo
	Mostovoi 34'; Adrian Ilie 66'	Report	Popescu 23'; Juan Sánchez 56'	Stadium: Balaídos

5 December 1998 13	Alavés	0-1	Valencia	Vitoria
		Report	Claudio López 65'	Stadium: Mendizorroza

12 December 1998 14	Valencia	1-0	Salamanca	Valencia
	Angulo 76'	Report		Stadium: Mestalla

19 December 1998 15	Espanyol	2-1	Valencia	Barcelona
	Joan Capdevila 35'; Cristóbal 75'	Report	Javier Farinós 42'	Stadium: Estadi Olímpic Lluís Companys

1 January 1999 16	Valencia	2-0	Real Sociedad	Valencia
	Stefan Schwarz 19'; Claudio López 60'	Report		Stadium: Mestalla

9 January 1999 17	Real Oviedo	2-2	Valencia	Oviedo
	Julio Dely Valdés 9'; Julio Dely Valdés 33'	Report	Joyce Moreno 22' (o.g.); Luis Milla 90'	Stadium: Carlos Tartiere

16 January 1999 18	Valencia	1-1	Tenerife	Valencia
	Claudio López 37' (pen.)	Report	Juanele 68' (pen.)	Stadium: Mestalla

23 January 1999 19	Mallorca	0-1	Valencia	Palma de Mallorca
		Report	Claudio López 49'	Stadium: Lluís Sitjar

29 January 1999 20	Atlético Madrid	1-2	Valencia	Madrid
	José Mari 18'	Report	Piojo López 12'; Angulo 27'	Stadium: Estadio Vicente Calderón

5 February 1999 21	Valencia	0-0	Deportivo	Valencia
		Report		Stadium: Mestalla

13 February 1999 22	Villarreal	1-0	Valencia	Villarreal
	Gheorghe Craioveanu 90'	Report		Stadium: El Madrigal

20 February 1999 23	Valencia	0-1	Valladolid	Valencia
		Report	Alen Peternac 80'	Stadium: Mestalla

26 February 1999 24	Barcelona	2-4	Valencia	Barcelona
	Patrick Kluivert 30'; Patrick Kluivert 78'	Report	Ilie 4'; Piojo López 37'; Angulo 82'; Piojo López 87'	Stadium: Camp Nou

6 March 1999 25	Valencia	4-1	Athletic Bilbao	Valencia
	Ilie 53'; Angloma 67'; Ilie 73' (pen.); Claudio Piojo López 85'	Report	Ismael Urzaiz 36'	Stadium: Mestalla

12 March 1999 26	Betis	0-1	Valencia	Sevilla
		Report	Gaizka Mendieta 43'	Stadium: Estadio Benito Villamarin

20 March 1999 27	Valencia	1-1	Real Zaragoza	Valencia
	Adrian Ilie 48'	Report	Gustavo López 18'	Stadium: Mestalla

2 April 1999 28	Racing Santander	0-1	Valencia	Santander
		Report	Björklund 80'	Stadium: El Sardinero

10 April 1999 29	Valencia	1-1	Extremadura	Valencia
	Serban 64'	Report	Esposito 62'	Stadium: Mestalla

17 April 1999 30	Real Madrid	3-1	Valencia	Madrid
	Morientes 11'; Raúl 30'; Raúl 70'	Report	Mendieta 69'	Stadium: Santiago Bernabéu

23 April 1999 31	Valencia	2-2	Celta Vigo	Valencia
	Vlaovic 12'; Farinos 90'	Report	Juan Sánchez 41'; Karpin 90'	Stadium: Mestalla

30 April 1999 32	Valencia	5-0	Alavés	Valencia
	Piojo López 19'; Mendieta 33'; Piojo López 56'; Piojo López 71'; Mendieta 81'	Report		Stadium: Mestalla

8 May 1999 33	Salamanca	0-1	Valencia	Villares de la Reina
		Report	Vlaovic 23'	Stadium: El Helmántico

15 May 1999 34	Valencia	1-2	Espanyol	Valencia
	Piojo López 90'	Report	Tamudo 71'; Posse 90'	Stadium: Mestalla

22 May 1999 35	Real Sociedad	1-1	Valencia	San Sebastián
	Kovacevic 74'	Report	Ilie 90'	Stadium: Anoeta

28 May 1999 36	Valencia	3-0	Real Oviedo	Valencia
	Mendieta 44' (pen.); Piojo López 60'; Piojo López 76' (pen.)	Report		Stadium: Mestalla

12 June 1999 37	Tenerife	3-2	Valencia	Santa Cruz de Tenerife
	Pier 32'; Makaay 59'; Pier 70'	Report	Angulo 3'; Piojo López 87'	Stadium: Estadio Heliodoro Rodríguez

19 June 1999 38	Valencia	3-0	Mallorca	Valencia
	Ilie 12'; Mendieta 51'; Ilie 66'	Report		Stadium: Mestalla

==== Top scorers ====
- (Argentina) Claudio López 21
- (Romania) Adrian Ilie 11
- (Spain) Angulo 8
- (Spain) Gaizka Mendieta 7
- (Sweden) Stefan Schwarz 4

=== Copa del Rey ===
Eightfinals

19 January 1999	Levante	0-3	Valencia	Valencia
		Report	Navarro 5'; Navarro 63'; Mendieta 85'	Stadium: Estadio Ciudad de Valencia

2 February 1999	Valencia	1-0	Levante	Valencia
	Angloma 86'	Report		Stadium: Mestalla

==== Quarterfinals ====
17 February 1999	Barcelona	2-3	Valencia	Barcelona
	Kluivert 47'; Rivaldo 60'	Report	Piojo Lopez 51'; Piojo Lopez 56'; Mendieta 80'	Stadium: Camp Nou

23 February 1999	Valencia	4-3	Barcelona	Valencia
	Piojo Lopez 23'; Piojo Lopez 35'; Angulo 42'; Mendieta 69'	Report	Rivaldo 57'; Óscar 63' de Boer 81'	Stadium: Mestalla

==== Semifinals ====
9 June 1999	Valencia	6–0	Real Madrid	Valencia
	Piojo Lopez 19'; Roche 31'; Vlaović 34'; Roche 42'; Piojo Lopez 54'; Mendieta 72'	Report		Stadium: Mestalla; Referee: Antonio Jesús López Nieto

16 June 1999	Real Madrid	2–1	Valencia	Madrid
	Sávio 7'; Predrag Mijatović 53'	Report	Piojo Lopez 85'	Stadium: Santiago Bernabéu; Referee: Manuel Díaz Vega

==== Final ====
26 June 1999	Atlético Madrid	0 – 3	Valencia	Sevilla
21:30 CEST		Copa del Rey 1999	Piojo López 22', 81'; Mendieta 33'	Stadium: La Cartuja; Attendance: 45,000; Referee: Manuel Díaz Vega

=== UEFA Intertoto Cup ===
==== Quarter-finals ====
18 July 1998	Valencia (Spain)	4–1	(Russia) Shinnik Yaroslavl	Mestalla, Valencia
	Farinós 11'; Roche 25'; C. López 48', 87'	Report	Serebrennikov 50'	Attendance: 3,500; Referee: Domenico Messina (Italy)

25 July 1998	Shinnik Yaroslavl (Russia)	1–0	(Spain) Valencia	Shinnik Stadium, Yaroslavl
	Yuminov 12'	Report		Attendance: 8,000; Referee: Knud Erik Fisker (Denmark)

==== Semi-finals ====
29 July 1998	Espanyol (Spain)	0–1	(Spain) Valencia	Estadi Olímpic de Montjuïc, Barcelona
21:30		Report	C. López 44'	Attendance: 15,200; Referee: Lutz Michael Fröhlich (Germany)

5 August 1998	Valencia (Spain)	2–0	(Spain) Espanyol	Mestalla, Valencia
21:30	C. López 40', 79'	Report		Attendance: 40,000; Referee: Graham Poll (England)

==== Finals ====
11 August 1998	Austria Salzburg	0–2	(Spain) Valencia	Stadion Lehen, Salzburg
19:00		Report	Angulo 6'; Schwarz 44'	Attendance: 6,000; Referee: Metin Tokat (Turkey)

25 August 1998	Valencia (Spain)	2–1	Austria Salzburg	Mestalla, Valencia
22:00	Lucarelli 17'; Roche 36'	Report	Hütter 84'	Attendance: 40,000; Referee: Karl-Erik Nilsson (Sweden)

=== UEFA Cup ===
==== First round ====
15 September 1998	Steaua Bucharest (Romania)	3–4	(Spain) Valencia	Bucharest
20:30 (CET)	Lincar 30'; Roşu 60'; Dumitrescu 84'	Report	Ilie 11', 24'; Angulo 78', 86'	Stadium: Stadionul Steaua; Attendance: 12,000; Referee: (Switzerland) Urs Meier

29 September 1998	Valencia (Spain)	3–0	(Romania) Steaua Bucharest	Valencia
21:30 (CET)	Roche 52'; López 56'; Lucarelli 89'	Report		Stadium: Mestalla; Attendance: 15,000; Referee: (Poland) Ryszard Wójcik

==== Second round ====
20 October 1998	Liverpool (England)	0–0	(Spain) Valencia	Liverpool
20:45 (CET)		Report		Stadium: Anfield; Attendance: 26,004; Referee: (Italy) Livio Bazzoli

3 November 1998	Valencia (Spain)	2–2 (2-2a agg.)	(England) Liverpool	Valencia
21:30 (CET)	López 45', 90'	Report	McManaman 80'; Berger 85'	Stadium: Mestalla; Attendance: 53,000; Referee: (France) Gilles Veissière

== Statistics ==
=== Players statistics ===
No.	Pos	Nat	Player	Total		La Liga		Copa del Rey		UEFA Cup	
No.	Pos	Nat	Player	Apps	Goals	Apps	Goals	Apps	Goals	Apps	Goals
1	GK	(Spain) ESP	Cañizares	48	-51	38	-39	6	-7	4	-5
20	DF	(France) FRA	Angloma	36	2	22+7	1	5+1	1	0+1	0
16	DF	(France) FRA	Roche	37	3	25+4	0	5	2	3	1
5	DF	(Federal Republic of Yugoslavia) YUG	Djukic	41	1	32	1	5	0	4	0
15	DF	(Italy) ITA	Carboni	46	0	36	0	6	0	4	0
6	MF	(Spain) ESP	Mendieta	48	12	36+1	7	6+1	5	4	0
8	MF	(Spain) ESP	Farinos	41	2	28+4	2	6	0	0+3	0
21	MF	(Spain) ESP	Luis Milla	39	1	28+3	1	5	0	3	0
23	FW	(Spain) ESP	Angulo	46	12	31+5	8	5+1	2	4	2
11	FW	(Romania) ROU	Ilie	32	12	22+2	10	2+2	0	4	2
7	FW	(Argentina) ARG	Claudio López	42	32	31+1	21	5+1	8	4	3
13	GK	(Spain) ESP	Bartual	1	0	0	0	1	0	0	0
10	MF	(Sweden) SWE	Schwarz	33	4	22+8	4	1	0	2	0
14	DF	(Sweden) SWE	Bjorklund	33	1	23+1	1	4+1	0	4	0
3	DF	(Spain) ESP	Juanfran	27	0	15+6	0	3+2	0	0+1	0
18	MF	(Romania) ROU	Popescu	35	1	5+20	1	2+4	0	3+1	0
19	FW	(Croatia) CRO	Vlaovic	23	3	11+9	2	3	1		
25	DF	(Spain) ESP	Soria	17	0	6+4	0	2+3	0	1+1	0
9	FW	(Italy) ITA	Lucarelli	15	1	4+8	1	0	0	0+3	0
22	MF	(Romania) ROU	Serban	10	1	0+10	1				
4	DF	(Spain) ESP	Camarasa	5	0	2+1	0	1+1	0		
30	FW	(Spain) ESP	Navarro	6	2	0+4	0	2	2		
31	FW	(Spain) ESP	Jandro	4	0	0+2	0	1+1	0		
2	DF	(Spain) ESP	Navarro	0	0	0	0				
12	MF	(Argentina) ARG	Morigi								
17	DF	(Romania) ROU	Ilie	0	0	0	0				
24	DF	(Spain) ESP	Tellez	1	0	1	0				
26	GK	(Spain) ESP	Jonathan								
27	DF	(Spain) ESP	Curro Torres	2	0	0	0	1+1	0		
28	MF	(Spain) ESP	Porras								
29	DF	(Spain) ESP	Perez								
32	MF	(Spain) ESP	Soto								
