= 1999–2000 FC Barcelona season =

101st season in existence of FC Barcelona

Barcelona
1999–2000 season
- President: Josep Lluís Núñez
- Head Coach: Louis van Gaal
- Stadium: Camp Nou
- La Liga: 2nd
- Copa del Rey: Semi-finals
- Supercopa de España: Runners-up
- UEFA Champions League: Semi-finals
- Top goalscorer: League: Patrick Kluivert (15); All: Patrick Kluivert; Rivaldo (23)
Home colours	Away colours

Barcelona did not repeat its successful season in 1999–2000, and fell back to second in La Liga, as well as knocked out of the Champions League in the semi-finals.

Barcelona did not perform well in the mid season and lost the league title to Deportivo La Coruña just 5 points behind and Louis van Gaal was let go by the club, with former Real Betis coach Lorenzo Serra Ferrer taking over after 1999–2000 season.

Despite the trophyless season, the side managed to reach the semi-finals of the UEFA Champions League, where it lost to eventual competition runners up Valencia.

== Squad ==
Squad at end of season

Note: Flags indicate national team as defined under FIFA eligibility rules; some limited exceptions apply. Players may hold more than one non-FIFA nationality.

No.	Pos.	Nation	Player
1	GK	NED	Ruud Hesp
2	DF	NED	Michael Reiziger
3	DF	FRA	Frédéric Déhu
4	MF	ESP	Pep Guardiola (captain)
5	DF	ESP	Abelardo Fernández
6	MF	NED	Ronald de Boer
7	MF	POR	Luís Figo
8	MF	NED	Phillip Cocu
9	FW	NED	Patrick Kluivert
10	FW	FIN	Jari Litmanen
11	MF	BRA	Rivaldo
12	DF	ESP	Sergi Barjuán
14	MF	NGR	Emmanuel Amunike

No.	Pos.	Nation	Player
17	DF	NED	Winston Bogarde
19	FW	ESP	Dani García
20	MF	POR	Simão Sabrosa
21	MF	ESP	Luis Enrique
22	DF	NED	Frank de Boer
23	MF	NED	Boudewijn Zenden
25	GK	ESP	Francesc Arnau
26	MF	ESP	Xavi Hernández
28	MF	ESP	Gabri García
29	MF	ESP	Mario Rosas
31	MF	ESP	Nano
32	DF	ESP	Carles Puyol
37	FW	ESP	Sergio Santamaría

=== Transfers ===
==== In ====
- (Finland) Jari Litmanen – (Netherlands) Ajax
- (Portugal) Simão – (Portugal) Sporting CP
- (Spain) Dani – (Spain) Mallorca
- (France) Frédéric Déhu – (France) Lens

==== Out ====
- (Spain) Miguel Ángel Nadal – (Spain) Mallorca
- (Brazil) Sonny Anderson – (France) Lyon
- (Brazil) Giovanni – (Greece) Olympiacos
- (Argentina) (Italy) Mauricio Pellegrino – (Spain) Valencia
- (Spain) Albert Celades – (Spain) Celta Vigo
- (Spain) Roger García – (Spain) Espanyol
- (Spain) Óscar García – (Spain) Valencia (loan)
- (Federal Republic of Yugoslavia) Dragan Ćirić – (Greece) AEK Athens (loan)
- (Nigeria) Samuel Okunowo – (Portugal) Benfica (loan)

== Competitions ==
=== La Liga ===
==== League table ====
Pos	Team	Pld	W	D	L	GF	GA	GD	Pts	Qualification or relegation
1	Deportivo La Coruña (C)	38	21	6	11	66	44	+22	69	Qualification for the Club World Cup and Champions League group stage
2	Barcelona	38	19	7	12	70	46	+24	64 (Note: VAL 3–1 BAR; BAR 3–0 VAL)	Qualification for the Champions League group stage
3	Valencia	38	18	10	10	59	39	+20	64	Qualification for the Champions League third qualifying round
4	Zaragoza	38	16	15	7	60	40	+20	63	Qualification for the UEFA Cup first round (Note: Real Madrid qualified directly for the 2000–01 UEFA Champions League as holders. As a result, Zaragoza lost their spot in the UEFA Champions League and had to participate in the UEFA Cup.)
5	Real Madrid	38	16	14	8	58	48	+10	62	Qualification for the Champions League group stage

Source: LFP
Rules for classification: 1) points; 2) head-to-head points; 3) head-to-head goal difference; 4) head-to-head goals scored; 5) goal difference; 6) number of goals scored.
(C) Champions

==== Results by round ====
Round	1	2	3	4	5	6	7	8	9	10	11	12	13	14	15	16	17	18	19	20	21	22	23	24	25	26	27	28	29	30	31	32	33	34	35	36	37	38
Ground	H	A	H	A	H	A	H	A	H	A	H	A	A	H	A	H	A	H	A	A	H	A	H	A	H	A	H	A	H	A	H	H	A	H	A	H	A	H
Result	W	W	W	L	W	W	D	D	W	L	L	L	L	W	L	W	D	W	W	D	W	D	L	L	W	L	W	W	W	W	W	L	L	W	W	L	D	D
Position	2	2	1	2	1	1	1	2	1	3	5	5	5	4	6	4	4	3	3	3	2	3	3	4	2	5	3	3	2	2	2	2	2	2	2	2	2	2

Updated to match(es) played on 2008-07-16. Source: LFP.com
A = Away; H = Home; W = Win; D = Draw; L = Loss; = Leader, 2000–01 UEFA Champions League Group stage; = 2000–01 UEFA Champions League Group stage; = 2000–01 UEFA Champions League Qualifying round; = 2000–01 UEFA Cup; = 2000–01 Segunda División

==== Matches ====
22 August 1999 1	Barcelona	2–0	Real Zaragoza	Barcelona
	Figo 75'; Dani 77'	Report		Stadium: Camp Nou

29 August 1999 2	Racing Santander	1–2	Barcelona	Santander
	Ballesta 78' (pen.)	Report	Rivaldo 40'; Cocu 44'	Stadium: Estadio El Sardinero

11 September 1999 3	Barcelona	3–0	Espanyol	Barcelona
	Rivaldo 74' 85'; Kluivert 83'	Report		Stadium: Camp Nou

18 September 1999 4	Alavés	2–1	Barcelona	Vitoria, Spain
	Astudillo 43'; Ribera 70'	Report	Dani 22'

25 September 1999 5	Barcelona	4–1	Real Betis	Barcelona
	Dani 43' 44' 51'; Luis Enrique 50'	Report	Miroslav Karhan 37'	Stadium: Camp Nou

2 October 1999 6	Real Valladolid	0–2	Barcelona	Valladolid
		Report	Kluivert 30'; Rivaldo 71'	Stadium: Estadio Jose Zorrilla

13 October 1999 7	Barcelona	2–2	Real Madrid	Barcelona
	Rivaldo 28'; Figo 49'	Report	Raúl 26' 86'	Stadium: Camp Nou

16 October 1999 8	Numancia	3–3	Barcelona	Soria
	Ojeda 83' (pen.); Navarro 87'; Pacheta 95'	Report	Figo 5'; Litmanen 69'; Dani 88'

23 October 1999 9	Barcelona	4–0	Athletic Bilbao	Barcelona
	Cocu 38'; Rivaldo 60'; Figo 77' (pen.); Dani 89'	Report		Stadium: Camp Nou

30 October 1999 10	Deportivo La Coruña	2–1	Barcelona	La Coruña
	Makaay 1' 15'	Report	Rivaldo 66'	Stadium: Estadio Riazor

7 November 1999 11	Barcelona	1–2	Málaga	Barcelona
	Bogarde 28'	Report	Agostinho 8'; Valcarce 13'	Stadium: Camp Nou

20 November 1999 12	Valencia	3–1	Barcelona	Valencia
	López 31'; Ilie 35'; Gerard 89'	Report	Zenden 44'	Stadium: Estadio Mestalla

28 November 1999 13	Mallorca	3–2	Barcelona	Palma de Mallorca
	Tristán 33' 83' (pen.); Stanković 37'	Report	Kluivert 2' 63'	Stadium: Estadio Son Moix

4 December 1999 14	Barcelona	3–2	Real Oviedo	Barcelona
	Cocu 16' 26'; Kluivert 27'	Report	Losada 73'; González 89'	Stadium: Camp Nou

11 December 1999 15	Sevilla	3–2	Barcelona	Sevilla
	Juan Carlos 12' 79'; Salas 86'	Report	Dani 29'; Luis Enrique 59'	Stadium: Estadio Sanchez Pizjuan

19 December 1999 16	Barcelona	2–1	Atlético Madrid	Barcelona
	Luis Enrique 34'; Zenden 85'	Report	Hasselbaink 43' (pen.)	Stadium: Camp Nou

22 December 1999 17	Rayo Vallecano	1–1	Barcelona	Madrid
	Cembranos 25'	Report	Simão 54'	Stadium: Campo Deportivo Vallecas

5 January 2000 18	Barcelona	3–1	Real Sociedad	Barcelona
	Figo 26' 62'; Litmanen 36'	Report	Guardiola 91' (o.g.)	Stadium: Camp Nou

9 January 2000 19	Celta Vigo	0–2	Barcelona	Vigo
		Report	Figo 2'; Rivaldo 89'	Stadium: Estadio Balaídos

16 January 2000 20	Real Zaragoza	0–0	Barcelona	Zaragoza
		Report		Stadium: Estadio La Romareda

23 January 2000 21	Barcelona	1–0	Racing Santander	Barcelona
	Rivaldo 18'	Report		Stadium: Camp Nou

29 January 2000 22	Espanyol	1–1	Barcelona	Barcelona
	Benitez 21'	Report	Kluivert 44'	Stadium: Estadio Lluys Company

6 February 2000 23	Barcelona	0–1	Alavés	Barcelona
		Report	Nan Ribera 15'	Stadium: Camp Nou

13 February 2000 24	Real Betis	2–1	Barcelona	Sevilla
	Ito 7'; Alfonso 78'	Report	Kluivert 85'	Stadium: Estadio Benito Villamarin

20 February 2000 25	Barcelona	4–0	Real Valladolid	Barcelona
	de Boer 34'; Heinze 43' (o.g.); Rivaldo 49' 69'	Report		Stadium: Camp Nou

26 February 2000 26	Real Madrid	3–0	Barcelona	Madrid
	Roberto Carlos 5'; Anelka 19'; Morientes 52'	Report		Stadium: Estadio Santiago Bernabéu

4 March 2000 27	Barcelona	4–0	Numancia	Barcelona
	Gabri 28'; Dani 62' 77'; Figo 85'	Report		Stadium: Camp Nou

11 March 2000 28	Athletic Bilbao	0–4	Barcelona	Bilbao
		Report	Cocu 7' 74'; Kluivert 29'; Figo 89'	Stadium: Estadio San Mames

18 March 2000 29	Barcelona	2–1	Deportivo La Coruña	Barcelona
	Kluivert 23'; Rivaldo 32'	Report	Conceição 46'	Stadium: Camp Nou

25 March 2000 30	Málaga	1–2	Barcelona	Málaga
	Catanha 33'	Report	Abelardo 79'; Kluivert 85' (pen.)

2 April 2000 31	Barcelona	3–0	Valencia	Barcelona
	Bogarde 63'; Kluivert 68' 91'	Report		Stadium: Camp Nou

9 April 2000 32	Barcelona	0–3	Mallorca	Barcelona
		Report	Eto'o 14' 73'; Carreras 75'	Stadium: Camp Nou

15 April 2000 33	Real Oviedo	3–0	Barcelona	Oviedo
	Valdés 32' 80'; Roberto Pompei 55'	Report		Stadium: Estadio Carlos Tartiere

22 April 2000 34	Barcelona	2–0	Sevilla	Barcelona
	Kluivert 19'; Litmanen 89'	Report		Stadium: Camp Nou

29 April 2000 35	Atlético Madrid	0–3	Barcelona	Madrid
		Report	Sergi Barjuan 40'; Dani 63'; Gabri 89'	Stadium: Estadio Vicente Calderón

6 May 2000 36	Barcelona	0–2	Rayo Vallecano	Barcelona
		Report	Bolo 9' 86'	Stadium: Camp Nou

14 May 2000 37	Real Sociedad	0–0	Barcelona	San Sebastián
		Report		Stadium: Estadio Anoeta

19 May 2000 38	Barcelona	2–2	Celta Vigo	Barcelona
	Kluivert 46' (pen.) 51'	Report	Tomás 29'; Turdó 34'	Stadium: Camp Nou

=== Copa del Rey ===
==== Second round ====
15 December 1999	Almería	0–0	Barcelona	Almería
		Report

12 January 2000	Barcelona	2–0	Almería	Barcelona
	Xavi 88'; Rivaldo 90'			Stadium: Camp Nou

==== Eight-finals ====
20 January 2000	Ourense	1–2	Barcelona
	Martínez 61'	Report	Enrique 43'; Dani 50'

2 February 2000	Barcelona	0–0	Ourense	Barcelona
				Stadium: Camp Nou

==== Quarter-finals ====
10 February 2000	Osasuna	0–4	Barcelona	Pamplona
		Report	Enrique 35' 60'; Dani 75'; Kluivert 90'	Stadium: Estadio Reyno de Navarra

16 February 2000	Barcelona	2–0	Osasuna	Barcelona
	Litmanen 2'; Dani 68'			Stadium: Camp Nou

==== Semi-finals ====
12 April 2000	Atlético Madrid	3–0	Barcelona	Madrid
	Hasselbaink 29'; Baraja 47'; Leal 52'	Report		Stadium: Estadio Vicente Calderón

24 April 2000	Barcelona	0–3	Atlético Madrid	Barcelona
		Report		Stadium: Camp Nou

=== UEFA Champions League ===
==== First group stage ====
===== Group B =====
Team	Pld	W	D	L	GF	GA	GD	Pts	BAR	FIO	ARS	AIK
(Spain) Barcelona	6	4	2	0	19	9	+10	14	—	4–2	1–1	5–0
(Italy) Fiorentina	6	2	3	1	9	7	+2	9	3–3	—	0–0	3–0
(England) Arsenal	6	2	2	2	9	9	0	8	2–4	0–1	—	3–1
(Sweden) AIK	6	0	1	5	4	16	−12	1	1–2	0–0	2–3	—

Legend: Blue = home team win; Yellow = draw; Red = away team win.

14 September 1999	AIK (Sweden)	1–2	(Spain) Barcelona	Solna
20:45	Novaković 72'	Report	Abelardo 86'; Dani 90+3'	Stadium: Råsunda Stadium; Attendance: 30,543; Referee: (France) Alain Sars

22 September 1999	Barcelona (Spain)	4–2	(Italy) Fiorentina	Barcelona
20:45	Figo 7'; Luis Enrique 10'; Rivaldo 68' (pen.), 70'	Report	Batistuta 50'; Chiesa 79'	Stadium: Camp Nou; Attendance: 90,000; Referee: (Denmark) Kim Milton Nielsen

29 September 1999	Barcelona (Spain)	1–1	(England) Arsenal	Barcelona
20:45	Luis Enrique 16'	Report	Kanu 81'	Stadium: Camp Nou; Attendance: 87,574; Referee: (Germany) Markus Merk

19 October 1999	Arsenal (England)	2–4	(Spain) Barcelona	London
20:45	Bergkamp 44'; Overmars 85'	Report	Rivaldo 15' (pen.); Luis Enrique 16'; Figo 56'; Cocu 70'	Stadium: Wembley Stadium; Attendance: 73,091; Referee: (Switzerland) Urs Meier

27 October 1999	Barcelona (Spain)	5–0	(Sweden) AIK	Barcelona
20:45	Kluivert 15', 33'; Zenden 43'; Gabri 53'; Déhu 56'	Report		Stadium: Camp Nou; Attendance: 60,000; Referee: (Northern Ireland) Leslie Irvine

2 November 1999	Fiorentina (Italy)	3–3	(Spain) Barcelona	Florence
20:45	Bressan 14'; Balbo 56', 69'	Report	Figo 20'; Rivaldo 43', 74'	Stadium: Stadio Artemio Franchi; Attendance: 28,000; Referee: (Scotland) Hugh Dallas

==== Second group stage ====
===== Group A =====
Team	Pld	W	D	L	GF	GA	GD	Pts	BAR	POR	SPP	HRT
(Spain) Barcelona	6	5	1	0	17	5	+12	16	—	4–2	5–0	3–1
(Portugal) Porto	6	3	1	2	8	8	0	10	0–2	—	2–2	1–0
(Czech Republic) Sparta Prague	6	1	2	3	5	12	−7	5	1–2	0–2	—	1–0
(Germany) Hertha BSC	6	0	2	4	3	8	−5	2	1–1	0–1	1–1	—

Legend: Blue = home team win; Yellow = draw; Red = away team win.

23 November 1999	Hertha BSC (Germany)	1–1	(Spain) Barcelona	Berlin
	Michalke 33'		Luis Enrique 13'	Stadium: Olympiastadion; Attendance: 60,530; Referee: (Russia) Nikolay Levnikov

8 December 1999	Barcelona (Spain)	5–0	(Czech Republic) Sparta Prague	Barcelona
	Kluivert 44', 63'; Luis Enrique 45', 76'; Guardiola 60'			Stadium: Camp Nou; Attendance: 45,000; Referee: (Italy) Pierluigi Collina

1 March 2000	Barcelona (Spain)	4–2	(Portugal) Porto	Barcelona
	Rivaldo 16', 89'; F. De Boer 22'; Kluivert 45'		Jardel 5', 79'	Stadium: Camp Nou; Attendance: 60,000; Referee: (England) Paul Durkin

7 March 2000	Porto (Portugal)	0–2	(Spain) Barcelona	Porto
			Abelardo 37'; Rivaldo 59'	Stadium: Estádio das Antas; Attendance: 50,000; Referee: (Italy) Stefano Braschi

15 March 2000	Barcelona (Spain)	3–1	(Germany) Hertha BSC	Barcelona
	Xavi 11'; Gabri 48'; Kluivert 83'		Alves 7'	Stadium: Camp Nou; Attendance: 50,000; Referee: (Belgium) Michel Piraux

21 March 2000	Sparta Prague (Czech Republic)	1–2	(Spain) Barcelona	Prague
	Svoboda 18'		Gabri 52', 89'	Stadium: Letná; Referee: (Norway) Rune Pedersen

==== Quarter-finals ====
5 April 2000	Chelsea (England)	3–1	(Spain) Barcelona	London
	Zola 30'; Flo 34', 38'	[ Report]	Figo 64'	Stadium: Stamford Bridge; Attendance: 34,000; Referee: (Germany) Markus Merk

18 April 2000	Barcelona (Spain)	5–1 (a.e.t.)	(England) Chelsea	Barcelona
	Rivaldo 24', 99' (pen.); Figo 45'; Dani 83'; Kluivert 104'	[ Report]	Flo 60'	Stadium: Camp Nou; Attendance: 80,000; Referee: (Sweden) Anders Frisk

==== Semi-finals ====
2 May 2000	Valencia (Spain)	4–1	(Spain) Barcelona	Valencia
	Angulo 10', 43'; Mendieta 47' (pen.); C. López 90+2'		Pellegrino 27' (o.g.)	Stadium: Estadio Mestalla; Attendance: 48,000; Referee: (Switzerland) Urs Meier

10 May 2000	Barcelona (Spain)	2–1	(Spain) Valencia	Barcelona
	F. De Boer 78'; Cocu 90+2'		Mendieta 69'	Stadium: Camp Nou; Attendance: 65,000; Referee: (Portugal) Vítor Melo Pereira

=== Supercopa ===
8 August 1999	Valencia	1–0	Barcelona	Valencia
	López 86'	Report		Stadium: Estadio Mestalla

15 August 1999	Barcelona	3–3	Valencia	Barcelona
	Kluivert 13', 62' de Boer 21'	Report	Albelda 15'; Sánchez 54'; Farinós 65'	Stadium: Camp Nou

GAMES 1999–2000
24-07-1999 FRIENDLY. Koninklijke HFC-Barcelona 1–7

27-07-1999 FRIENDLY. FC Wageningen-Barcelona 0–12

29-07-1999 FRIENDLY. Amsterdamsche FC-Barcelona 2–10

31-07-1999 FRIENDLY. ADO Den Haag-Barcelona 0–4

04-08-1999 FRIENDLY. Waldhof Mannheim-Barcelona 0–1

06-08-1999 FRIENDLY. Hertha BSC-Barcelona 2–1

11-08-1999 Nike TROPHY. Barcelona-Boca Juniors 2–3

25-08-1999 Joan Gamper Trophy. Barcelona-Sporting CP 3–1

22-02-2000 Copa Catalunya. Balaguer-Barcelona 0–1

16-05-2000 Copa Catalunya Final. Barcelona-Mataró 3–0

== Statistics ==
=== Players statistics ===
No.	Pos	Nat	Player	Total		La Liga		Copa del Rey		UEFA Champions League	
No.	Pos	Nat	Player	Apps	Goals	Apps	Goals	Apps	Goals	Apps	Goals
1	GK	(Netherlands) NED	Hesp	40	-49	22	-27	6	-4	12	-18
2	DF	(Netherlands) NED	Reiziger	44	0	29	0	3+1	0	9+2	0
5	DF	(Spain) ESP	Abelardo	37	3	25	1	3	0	7+2	2
22	DF	(Netherlands) NED	Frank de Boer	40	2	20+2	0	6	0	12	2
32	DF	(Spain) ESP	Puyol	37	0	18+6	0	5	0	7+1	0
7	MF	(Portugal) POR	Figo	49	14	32	9	4	0	13	5
8	MF	(Netherlands) NED	Cocu	51	8	34+1	6	2	0	14	2
4	MF	(Spain) ESP	Guardiola	39	1	22+3	0	2	0	12	1
23	MF	(Netherlands) NED	Zenden	43	3	21+8	2	4	0	8+2	1
9	FW	(Netherlands) NED	Kluivert	42	23	24+2	15	2	1	14	7
11	FW	(Brazil) BRA	Rivaldo	50	23	30+1	12	5	1	14	10
25	GK	(Spain) ESP	Arnau	21	-24	16	-19	1	0	4	-5
19	FW	(Spain) ESP	Dani García	43	16	15+12	11	6+1	3	3+6	2
26	MF	(Spain) ESP	Xavi	38	2	15+9	0	3+1	1	5+5	1
21	MF	(Spain) ESP	Luis Enrique	31	12	15+4	3	4+1	3	7	6
10	FW	(Finland) FIN	Litmanen	31	4	14+7	3	1+1	1	2+6	0
17	DF	(Netherlands) NED	Bogarde	35	2	14+7	2	4	0	9+1	0
12	DF	(Spain) ESP	Sergi	29	1	14+5	1	4	0	4+2	0
6	MF	(Netherlands) NED	Ronald de Boer	37	1	10+10	1	6	0	7+4	0
28	MF	(Spain) ESP	Gabri	30	6	10+7	2	1+3	0	6+3	4
20	MF	(Portugal) POR	Simao	31	1	9+12	1	3	0	2+5	0
3	DF	(France) FRA	Déhu	22	1	9+2	0	2+1	0	5+3	1
31	MF	(Spain) ESP	Nano	2	0	0+1	0	0	0	0+1	0
37	FW	(Spain) ESP	Santamaria	1	0	0+1	0	0	0	0	0
29	MF	(Spain) ESP	Mario Rosas	4	0	0	0	0+3	0	0+1	0
14	MF	(Nigeria) NGR	Amunike	0	0	0	0	0	0	0	0
