= Curro Montoya =

Spanish footballer

Personal information
- Full name: Francisco José Montoya Gómez
- Date of birth: 13 February 1977 (age 49)
- Place of birth: Alicante, Spain
- Height: 1.82 m (6 ft 0 in)
- Position: Midfielder

Youth career
- 1990–1994: Hércules
- 1994–1995: Valencia

Senior career*
Years	Team	Apps	(Gls)
1995–2000	Valencia B	133	(5)
2000–2001	Numancia	6	(0)
2001–2002	Jaén	26	(0)
2002–2004	Elche	60	(1)
2004–2007	Ciudad Murcia	74	(0)
2007–2009	Granada 74	17	(0)
2009	Orihuela	1	(0)
2010	Atlético Ciudad	5	(0)
2010–2011	La Nucía		
Total		322	(6)

International career
1992–1993	Spain U16	20	(2)
1993–1995	Spain U18	17	(1)
1997	Spain U20	6	(0)
- * Club domestic league appearances and goals

Francisco José "Curro" Montoya Gómez (born 13 February 1977) is a Spanish retired footballer who played as a defensive midfielder.

== Club career ==
Montoya was born in Alicante, Valencian Community. After starting his development at Hércules CF he finished it with neighbouring Valencia CF, going on to spend five years with their reserves in the third division. In 2000–01 he made his La Liga debut, appearing rarely for CD Numancia in a relegation-ending season.

Subsequently, Montoya played seven years in the second level, with Real Jaén, Elche CF, Ciudad de Murcia and Granada 74 CF. In his debut campaign at the latter club he suffered a serious injury which sidelined him for several months, as the team suffered relegation.

In 2009–10, Montoya represented Atlético Ciudad and Orihuela CF, both in division three and both undergoing institutional and economic problems. For the following season, he joined CF La Nucía of the fourth tier.

== International career ==
Montoya represented Spain at the 1997 FIFA World Youth Championship in Malaysia, playing four games for the eventual quarter-finalists in a squad which also featured Valencia youth graduates David Albelda, Miguel Ángel Angulo and Javier Farinós.

== Honours ==
Spain U18

- UEFA European Under-18 Championship: 1995
