= 1999 Supercopa de España =

Valencia
Barcelona
	3
- on aggregate

First leg
Valencia
1	0
- Date: 8 August 1999
- Venue: Mestalla, Valencia
- Referee: José María García-Aranda
- Attendance: 45,000

Second leg
	Valencia
3	3
- Date: 15 August 1999
- Venue: Camp Nou, Barcelona
- Referee: Antonio Jesús López Nieto
- Attendance: 50,000

The 1999 Supercopa de España was a Spanish football competition, played over two legs on 8 August and 15 August 1999. It was contested by Valencia, who were Spanish Cup winners in 1998–99, and Barcelona, who won the 1998–99 Spanish League.

Valencia were the winners.

== Match details ==
=== First leg ===
8 August 1999
21:45 CET

Valencia	1–0	Barcelona
López 86'

Mestalla, Valencia
Attendance: 45,000
Referee: García-Aranda

Valencia	Barcelona

GK	1	(Spain) Santiago Cañizares	(yellow card) 15'
RB	20	(France) Jocelyn Angloma
CB	3	(Sweden) Joachim Björklund
CB	5	(Federal Republic of Yugoslavia) Miroslav Đukić
LB	15	(Italy) Amedeo Carboni		(substituted off) 80'
RM	6	(Spain) Gaizka Mendieta (c)
CM	8	(Spain) Javier Farinós		(substituted off) 78'
CM	23	(Spain) David Albelda
LM	7	(Argentina) Claudio López
CF	10	(Spain) Miguel Ángel Angulo
CF	11	(Romania) Adrian Ilie		(substituted off) 68'
Substitutes:
FW	17	(Spain) Juan Sánchez		(substituted on) 68'
MF	9	(Spain) Óscar		(substituted on) 78'
DF	24	(Argentina) Daniel Fagiani		(substituted on) 80'
Manager:
(Argentina) Héctor Cúper

GK	1	(Netherlands) Ruud Hesp
RB	2	(Netherlands) Michael Reiziger	(yellow card) 18'
CB	22	(Netherlands) Frank de Boer
LB	12	(Spain) Sergi
DM	4	(Spain) Pep Guardiola (c)		(substituted off) 50'
RM	21	(Spain) Luis Enrique
LM	8	(Netherlands) Phillip Cocu	(yellow card) 72'	(substituted off) 77'
AM	10	(Finland) Jari Litmanen
RW	7	(Portugal) Luís Figo
CF	9	(Netherlands) Patrick Kluivert
LW	23	(Netherlands) Boudewijn Zenden		(substituted off) 58'
Substitutes:
DF	3	(France) Frédéric Déhu		(substituted on) 50'
FW	20	(Portugal) Simão		(substituted on) 58'
MF	28	(Spain) Gabri		(substituted on) 77'
Manager:
(Netherlands) Louis van Gaal

=== Second leg ===
15 August 1999
21:45 CET

Barcelona	3–3	Valencia
Kluivert 13', 62'; R. De Boer 21'		Albelda 15'; Sánchez 54'; Farinós 65'

Camp Nou, Barcelona
Attendance: 50,000
Referee: López Nieto

Barcelona	Valencia

GK	1	(Netherlands) Ruud Hesp
RB	2	(Netherlands) Michael Reiziger
CB	22	(Netherlands) Frank de Boer
LB	12	(Spain) Sergi
DM	4	(Spain) Pep Guardiola (c)		(substituted off) 75'
RM	21	(Spain) Luis Enrique	(yellow card) 24'	(substituted off) 73'
LM	8	(Netherlands) Phillip Cocu
AM	6	(Netherlands) Ronald de Boer		(substituted off) 71'
RW	7	(Portugal) Luís Figo	(yellow card) 62'
CF	9	(Netherlands) Patrick Kluivert
LW	31	(Spain) Nano
Substitutes:
MF	28	(Spain) Gabri		(substituted on) 71'
FW	19	(Spain) Dani		(substituted on) 73'
FW	23	(Netherlands) Boudewijn Zenden		(substituted on) 75'
Manager:
(Netherlands) Louis van Gaal

GK	1	(Spain) Santiago Cañizares	(yellow card) 62'
RB	20	(France) Jocelyn Angloma
CB	3	(Sweden) Joachim Björklund
CB	5	(Federal Republic of Yugoslavia) Miroslav Đukić
LB	15	(Italy) Amedeo Carboni	(yellow card) 49'
RM	6	(Spain) Gaizka Mendieta (c)
CM	8	(Spain) Javier Farinós
CM	23	(Spain) David Albelda	(yellow card) 37' (yellow-red card) 83'
LM	7	(Argentina) Claudio López
CF	10	(Spain) Miguel Ángel Angulo		(substituted off) 78'
CF	17	(Spain) Juan Sánchez		(substituted off) 64'
Substitutes:
MF	18	(Argentina) Kily González		(substituted on) 64'
MF	14	(Spain) Gerard		(substituted on) 78'
Manager:
(Argentina) Héctor Cúper

== See also ==
- 1999–2000 La Liga
- 1999–2000 Copa del Rey
- 1999–2000 FC Barcelona season
- 1999–2000 Valencia CF season
