= Miguel Ángel Angulo =

Spanish footballer (born 1977)

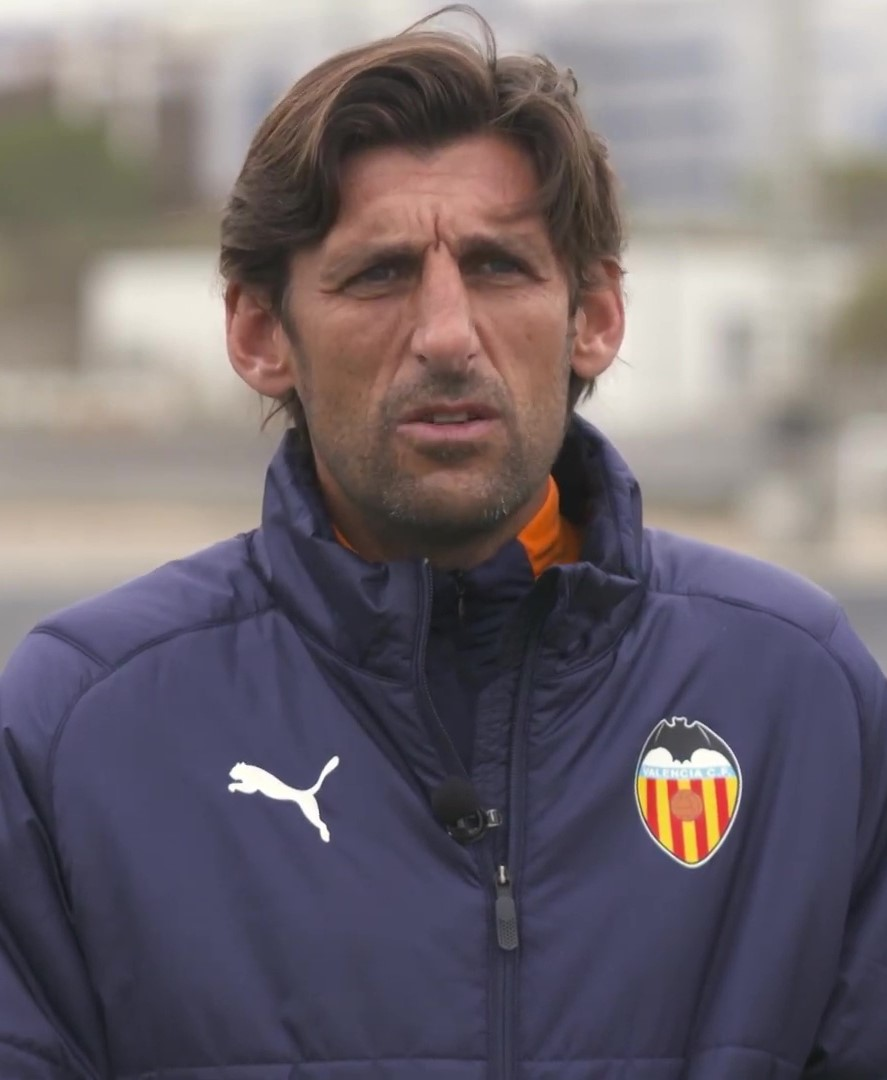
- Angulo in 2021

Personal information
- Full name: Miguel Ángel Angulo Valderrey
- Date of birth: 23 June 1977 (age 49)
- Place of birth: Oviedo, Spain
- Height: 1.80 m (5 ft 11 in)
- Positions: Midfielder; forward; defender

Youth career
- Avilés
- 1994–1995: Sporting Gijón

Senior career*
Years	Team	Apps	(Gls)
1995	Sporting Gijón B	14	(4)
1996	Valencia B	15	(2)
1996–2009	Valencia	313	(43)
1996–1997	→ Villarreal (loan)	32	(9)
2009	Sporting CP	4	(0)
Total		378	(58)

International career
1994–1995	Spain U18	7	(4)
1997	Spain U20	7	(2)
1998–2000	Spain U21	14	(3)
2000	Spain U23	5	(1)
2004–2007	Spain	11	(0)
2000	Asturias	1	(0)

Managerial career
- 2014–2015: Valencia (youth)
- 2015–2016: Valencia (assistant)
- 2018–2021: Valencia (youth)
- 2021–2026: Valencia B
Medal record
Representing Spain
Men's Football
Silver medal – second place	2000 Sydney	Team competition
- * Club domestic league appearances and goals

Miguel Ángel Angulo Valderrey (Spanish pronunciation: [miˈɣel ˈaŋxel aŋˈɡulo]; born 23 June 1977) is a Spanish former professional footballer, currently a manager. Predominantly an attacking midfielder, he was also able to play as a right winger and even as a right-back or a forward.

Basing his football on inexhaustible physical display, Angulo was much appreciated by trainers because of his versatility, and spent most of his career at Valencia where he won a total of seven trophies, including two La Liga championships and the 2004 UEFA Cup.

== Club career ==
=== Valencia ===
Born in Oviedo, Asturias, Angulo began his football career with local Sporting de Gijón, joining Valencia CF in January 1996 at the age of 18. After spending some time with the reserves he was loaned in the 1996–97 campaign to Segunda División club Villarreal CF, before returning to Valencia the following summer.

Angulo made 434 competitive appearances and scored 67 goals during his spell at the Mestalla Stadium, being a very important element in the Che's La Liga conquest in 2002 and 2004 (totalling six goals in 48 games), while also starting in the 2004 UEFA Cup final which they won after defeating Olympique de Marseille; he scored as a substitute in wins at Maccabi Haifa F.C. and Beşiktaş J.K. in earlier rounds. Due to the ageing of the previous starter, Frenchman Jocelyn Angloma, he played several matches as an attacking right-back, as the team operated mainly in a 5–3–2 formation.

In summer 2004, Angulo pulled out of a transfer to Arsenal after a last-minute change of heart. His agent claimed this was due to the player's anxiety at moving to London; he had already completed part of his medical. He continued to be heavily played by Valencia in the following three seasons, netting 15 times in 93 league games. On 15 December 2004, he was handed a seven-match ban by UEFA after being sent off in a UEFA Cup tie against SV Werder Bremen where he kicked Nelson Valdez and subsequently spat on Tim Borowski.

On 20 December 2007, Angulo, along with Santiago Cañizares and David Albelda, was axed from the squad by new coach Ronald Koeman. In late April of the following year, however, with Koeman's sacking, all three were reinstated by new manager Voro in a squad seriously threatened with relegation, with five remaining fixtures. On 27 April he returned to action, playing five minutes in a 3–0 home win over CA Osasuna after having come on as a substitute for David Villa. He started his first post-reinstatement match two weeks later, scoring in a 5–1 away rout of already relegated Levante UD.

=== Sporting CP ===
In August 2009, after a mediocre campaign individually, Angulo was released by Valencia, thus ending a 14-year relationship. Late in the same month he agreed to a one-year contract with Sporting CP, but after just four months, he was released by the Lisbon club, grossly unsettled, and pondered his retirement, which was confirmed the following week.

=== Coaching ===
Angulo returned to Valencia as a coach, being hired at the Infantil B team in 2014. The following December, he moved up from the under-19s to be assistant to Gary Neville in the main squad, alongside the Englishman's brother Phil. He was dismissed alongside the head coach in late March 2016.

After three years back in the youth ranks, Angulo was hired as manager of the reserve side on 17 June 2021. In his first season, he won promotion from the fifth-tier Tercera División RFEF as group champions. After missing out on a second consecutive promotion by a late single-goal defeat to CP Cacereño in the 2023 Segunda Federación play-offs, he extended his contract to 2025.

== International career ==
Angulo made his debut for Spain on 17 November 2004, in a 1–0 friendly win against England played in Madrid. Going on to collect 11 caps, he never took part in any major tournament, however.

Angulo also represented the nation at the 1997 FIFA World Youth Championship (five appearances) and the 2000 Summer Olympics (five), helping to a runner-up finish in the latter competition. He also played in Asturias' first representative game since 1936 the same year, a 1–0 victory over Macedonia in his hometown.

== Career statistics ==
=== Club ===
Appearances and goals by club, season and competition
Club	Season	League			Cup		Continental		Total	
Club	Season	Division	Apps	Goals	Apps	Goals	Apps	Goals	Apps	Goals
Sporting Gijón B	1995–96	Segunda División B	14	4	—				14	4
Valencia B	1995–96	Segunda División B	15	2	—				15	2
Villarreal (loan)	1996–97	Segunda División	32	9	5	1	—		33	10
Valencia	1997–98	La Liga	28	3	3	3	–	–	31	6
Valencia	1998–99	La Liga	36	8	6	2	10	3	52	13
Valencia	1999–00	La Liga	29	5	3	0	18	3	50	8
Valencia	2000–01	La Liga	28	0	2	1	10	0	40	1
Valencia	2001–02	La Liga	26	4	0	0	5	2	31	6
Valencia	2002–03	La Liga	24	4	4	0	11	2	39	6
Valencia	2003–04	La Liga	22	2	5	1	9	2	36	5
Valencia	2004–05	La Liga	25	3	3	0	5	0	33	3
Valencia	2005–06	La Liga	32	6	4	0	1	0	37	6
Valencia	2006–07	La Liga	36	6	3	2	10	2	49	10
Valencia	2007–08	La Liga	16	2	0	0	4	0	20	2
Valencia	2008–09	La Liga	11	0	3	1	2	0	16	1
Valencia	Total		313	43	36	10	85	14	434	67
Sporting CP	2009–10	Primeira Liga	4	0	2	0	3	0	9	0
Career total			378	58	43	11	86	14	505	83

=== International ===
Spain
Year	Apps	Goals
2004	1	0
2005	0	0
2006	3	0
2007	7	0
Total	11	0

== Managerial statistics ==
As of 22 March 2025

Managerial record by team and tenure
Team	Nat	From	To	Record								Ref
Team	Nat	From	To	G	W	D	L	GF	GA	GD	Win %	Ref
Valencia B	(Spain)	17 June 2021	24 March 2026	168	69	55	44	239	171	+68	41.07	
Total				168	69	55	44	239	171	+68	41.07	—

== Honours ==
Valencia

- La Liga: 2001–02, 2003–04
- Copa del Rey: 1998–99
- Supercopa de España: 1999
- UEFA Cup: 2003–04
- UEFA Super Cup: 2004
- UEFA Intertoto Cup: 1998
- UEFA Champions League runner-up: 1999–2000

Spain U18

- UEFA European Under-18 Championship: 1995

Spain U21

- UEFA European Under-21 Championship: 1998

Spain U23

- Summer Olympics silver medal: 2000
