= Daniel Fagiani =

Argentine footballer

Personal information
- Full name: Daniel Fernando Fagiani
- Date of birth: 22 January 1974 (age 52)
- Place of birth: Argentina
- Height: 1.74 m (5 ft 9 in)
- Positions: Left-back; left midfielder

Team information
- Current team: Sportivo Las Parejas (manager)

Senior career*
Years	Team	Apps	(Gls)
–1999	Newell's Old Boys	115	(12)
1999–2000	Valencia	8	(0)
2000	Boca Juniors	16	(0)
2000–2001	Atlético Madrid	22	(0)
2001	San Lorenzo	4	(0)
2002	Gimnasia y Esgrima La Plata	0	(0)
2002–2004	Numancia	62	(9)
2004–2006	Tenerife	61	(2)
2007	Argentino de Rosario	11	(2)

Managerial career
- 2026–: Sportivo Las Parejas
- * Club domestic league appearances and goals

Daniel Fagiani (born 22 January 1974) is an Argentine former professional footballer who played as a left-back or left midfielder. He manages Sportivo Las Parejas.

== Career ==
Fagiani started his senior career with Newell's Old Boys. In 1999, he signed for Valencia in La Liga, where he made twelve appearances and scored zero goals. In July 2001 he moved to San Lorenzo. He was set to make his debut for Gimnasia y Esgrima La Plata in January 2002.

Fagiani joined Primera C side Argentino de Rosario in August 2007 on a contract until December, having been without a club for year after leaving Tenerife.

== Honours ==
Valencia

- Supercopa de España: 1999
