= Miguel Ángel Soria =

Spanish footballer

Personal information
- Full name: Miguel Ángel Soria López
- Date of birth: 26 March 1974 (age 52)
- Place of birth: Valencia, Spain
- Height: 1.86 m (6 ft 1 in)
- Position: Centre-back

Youth career
- Valencia

Senior career*
Years	Team	Apps	(Gls)
1994–1997	Valencia Mestalla	70	(4)
1997–2000	Valencia	36	(0)
1996–1997	→ Levante (loan	26	(0)
2000–2001	Numancia	32	(1)
2001–2004	Córdoba	50	(0)
2004–2006	Almería	39	(1)
Total		253	(6)
- * Club domestic league appearances and goals

Miguel Ángel Soria López (born 26 March 1974) is a Spanish former professional footballer who played as a centre-back.

== Career ==
Soria joined Levante UD on loan from Valencia CF for the 1996–97 season.
