= Juan Sánchez (footballer, born 1972) =

Spanish former professional footballer (born 1972)

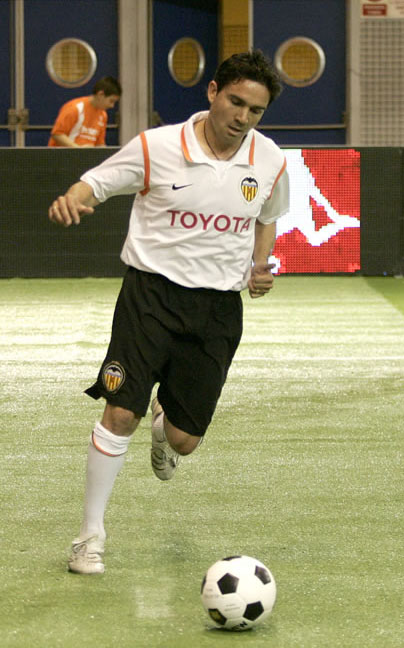
- Sánchez in 2009

Personal information
- Full name: Juan Ginés Sánchez Moreno
- Date of birth: 15 May 1972 (age 54)
- Place of birth: Aldaia, Spain
- Height: 1.72 m (5 ft 8 in)
- Position: Striker

Youth career
- Valencia

Senior career*
Years	Team	Apps	(Gls)
1991–1993	Valencia B	20	(5)
1992–1994	Valencia	17	(3)
1993–1994	→ Mallorca (loan)	37	(16)
1994–1999	Celta	159	(38)
1999–2004	Valencia	125	(27)
2004–2006	Celta	23	(5)
Total		381	(94)

International career
1992–1993	Spain U21	5	(0)
1998	Spain	1	(0)
- * Club domestic league appearances and goals

Juan Ginés Sánchez Moreno (born 15 May 1972) is a Spanish former professional footballer who played as a striker.

In a career almost entirely associated to Valencia – which he helped to two La Liga titles – and Celta, he scored 89 goals as a professional in 361 games.

== Club career ==
Born in Aldaia, Valencian Community, Sánchez started playing professionally for Valencia CF, and his first La Liga appearance was on 25 October 1992 in a 3–0 loss at FC Barcelona. In the season's closing stages he scored his first goal(s) for the Che, having come on as a late substitute in a 2–0 home win over RCD Español.

After a successful loan stint in the Segunda División with RCD Mallorca, Sánchez signed with RC Celta de Vigo, becoming an important attacking element in the Galicians' domestic and European consolidation. In his last two seasons, as they finished respectively sixth and fifth, he totalled 22 goals, eventually returning to his first club.

Sánchez scored 12 times in the league in the 2000–01 campaign, notably back-to-back braces against CD Numancia (3–0) and UD Las Palmas (5–1). He added a further two in the UEFA Champions League semi-final second leg against Leeds United for a 3–0 home victory, being replaced in the final loss to FC Bayern Munich.

Subsequently, after appearing in 25 games in the team's 2001–02 league conquest, Sánchez's importance lessened dramatically in his final season, where he played only ten matches for the champions, no complete ones. He retired aged 34 following a second stint at Celta, which he helped achieve a return to the top tier.

Sánchez became Valencia's sporting director in April 2008, succeeding Miguel Ángel Ruiz and leaving the post in August. In June 2009 he moved to R.E. Mouscron from Belgium in the same capacity, rejoining former Valencia teammates Amedeo Carboni and Miroslav Đukić – the latter being signed as head coach.

== International career ==
Sánchez earned one cap for Spain, playing 12 minutes in a 2–2 friendly against Italy on 18 November 1998 in Salerno.

== Honours ==
Valencia

- La Liga: 2001–02, 2003–04
- Supercopa de España: 1999
- UEFA Cup: 2003–04
- UEFA Champions League runner-up: 1999–2000, 2000–01
