= Amedeo Carboni =

Italian footballer (born 1965)

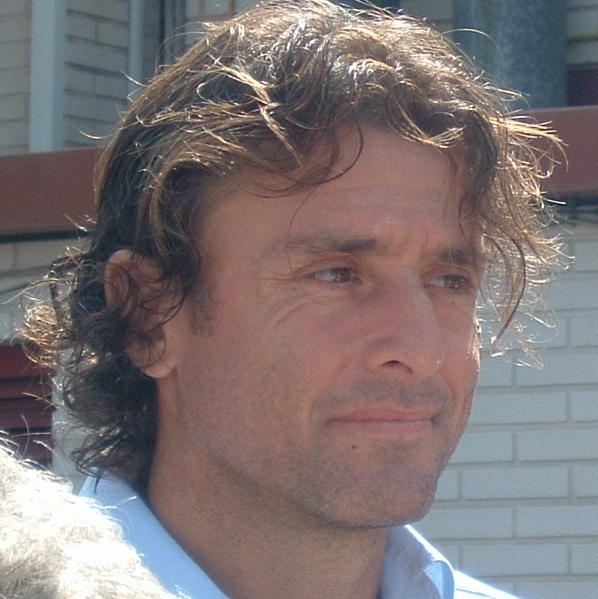
- Carboni with Valencia in 2005

Personal information
- Full name: Amedeo Carboni
- Date of birth: 6 April 1965 (age 61)
- Place of birth: Arezzo, Italy
- Height: 1.79 m (5 ft 10 in)
- Position: Left-back

Youth career
- 1975–1983: Arezzo

Senior career*
Years	Team	Apps	(Gls)
1983–1986	Arezzo	22	(1)
1983–1984	→ Fiorentina (loan)	0	(0)
1985–1986	→ Bari (loan)	10	(0)
1986–1987	Empoli	11	(0)
1987–1988	Parma	28	(1)
1988–1990	Sampdoria	60	(2)
1990–1997	Roma	186	(3)
1997–2006	Valencia	245	(1)
Total		562	(8)

International career
1992–1997	Italy	18	(0)
- * Club domestic league appearances and goals

Amedeo Carboni (Italian pronunciation: [ameˈdɛːo karˈboːni]; born 6 April 1965) is an Italian former footballer who played as a left-back.

In a professional career which spanned 22 years and saw him appear in nearly 700 official games, he played mainly for Roma (seven seasons) and Valencia (nine), winning a combined eight major titles for the two clubs.

Carboni was capped 18 times for the Italy national team, representing them at Euro 1996.

== Club career ==
=== Early years ===
Born in Arezzo, Tuscany, Carboni started playing professionally for local Arezzo, in Serie B. During his spell with the club he was also loaned twice, including a stint at Bari with which he made his Serie A debut, in a relegation-ending season.

After nearly meeting the same fate with Empoli FC, Carboni spent one season with Parma in the second division, following which he returned to the top level with UC Sampdoria, being first-choice and helping the Genoa team to win the Coppa Italia during his first season and also the UEFA Cup Winners' Cup in his second, playing the full 120 minutes in the final against R.S.C. Anderlecht (2–0 win).

=== Roma ===
In the summer of 1990, Carboni joined AS Roma, being an undisputed starter during his seven-year spell, with the exception of the 1992–93 campaign due to a serious injury. Under manager Ottavio Bianchi, he won the Italian Cup in 1991 in a 4–2 aggregate victory over former club Sampdoria; he also appeared in the first leg of the UEFA Cup final that year, which ended in a 2–0 defeat to Inter Milan.

Carboni spent his final season as team captain, inheriting the armband from Giuseppe Giannini.

=== Valencia ===
Aged already 32, Carboni moved abroad for the first time, signing for Spanish side Valencia CF in July 1997. Both he and Roma were initially reluctant to the move, with the player having recently overcome a major Achilles heel injury. Carboni was approached by Roberto Baggio's agent, Antonio Caliendo. Carboni assured Caliendo that he was not prepared for the move, but was eventually convinced to join after meeting with Valencia president Paco Roig, and ended up signing for the club on the back of a napkin. Initially, Valencia were criticised for spending 2 million euros on a player who was expected to retire within a few years. On 7 September 1997 he became only the seventh Italian to ever play in La Liga (with four of the last seven having come within the past year following a 46 year absence), and was sent off in his first game against FC Barcelona. He appeared in 29 La Liga games in his first season, receiving nine yellow cards and three red as they finished in ninth position, in a campaign which saw manager Jorge Valdano being fired after only three rounds, with the player's countryman Claudio Ranieri taking his place.

Carboni formed an efficient full back partnership with Jocelyn Angloma (born in the same year) in his first years with the Che, eventually helping the team to the 2001-02 and 2003-04 Spanish national championships and five other trophies, with Angloma having already left the club in the 2003–04 conquest. He also helped Valencia to their second consecutive UEFA Champions League final against FC Bayern Munich in 2001, but missed his penalty in an eventual shootout loss; during the first 120 minutes, he also committed the penalty that led to the Stefan Effenberg 1–1 equaliser.

The 38-year-old Carboni played 44 competitive matches as Valencia won the league/UEFA Cup double in 2003–04. On 23 October 2005 he became the oldest player at the age of 40 years, six months and 17 days to take the field in the Spanish league, a record previously held by Deportivo de La Coruña's Donato – he had already achieved the feat of being the oldest winner of any European club competition when he won the UEFA Cup. Due to his age, Carboni became known in Valencia's dressing rooms as Yayo, meaning Grandpa in Spanish.

The 2004-05 season saw the return of Claudio Ranieri, who replaced Rafael Benítez after he signed to manage Liverpool. Under Ranieri's second spell, Valencia began recruiting a number of Italian players, including Bernardo Corradi, Marco Di Vaio, Stefano Fiore and Emiliano Moretti. Ranieri was sacked following a seventh place finish in La Liga, with Moretti being the only of the Italian signings who was still at the club by the end of 2006. After the emergence of Moretti, Carboni only played five times in 2005–06, and retired from football at the age of 41, having appeared in 346 official games for Valencia. His last game was away against CA Osasuna on 16 May 2006. Ten days earlier against Atlético Madrid, he received a large ovation from the crowd when playing his last game at Valencia's home ground, the Mestalla. At the time of his retirement, he was just two months younger than Valencia's manager Quique Sánchez Flores, who was also 41 years old. Three days after playing his final game, he became the club's director of football.

On 19 June 2007, Carboni was sacked by Valencia as the working relationship between him and Quique Sánchez Flores was strained after several disputes. The manager was dismissed himself only four months later.

=== Late career ===
On 10 June 2009, Carboni became the new sporting director at Mouscron in Belgium, teaming up with former Valencia teammate Miroslav Đukić, who acted as the manager. In early June of the following year he reunited with former Valencia boss Rafael Benítez at Inter Milan, working with the Nerazzurri as technical consultant.

== International career ==
On 21 December 1988, Carboni earned his only cap for the Italy under-21 side, scoring in an 8–0 home rout of Malta. He made his full debut on 25 March 1992 – two weeks shy of his 27th birthday – in a 1–0 friendly home win over Germany. He missed the 1990 and 1994 FIFA World Cups due to injury.

Carboni was selected by manager Arrigo Sacchi for the squad that appeared at UEFA Euro 1996, playing against the Czech Republic (1–2 loss) and Germany (0–0) in an eventual group stage exit. On 2 April 1997 he made his eighteenth and final appearance, coming on as a substitute in a 0–0 away draw with Poland for the 1998 FIFA World Cup qualifiers as Cesare Maldini was in charge.

== Style of play ==
Carboni was an athletic and hard-working attacking full back, who was known for his surging runs along the left flank as well as his longevity, stamina and defensive consistency.

== Personal life ==
Carboni's older brother, Guido, was also a footballer and later a manager.

== Career statistics ==
=== Club ===
Appearances and goals by club, season and competition
Club	Season	League		
Club	Season	Division	Apps	Goals
Arezzo	1984–85		22	1
Bari (loan)	1985–86		10	0
Empoli	1986–87		11	0
Parma	1987–88		28	1
Sampdoria	1988–89		31	1
Sampdoria	1989–90		29	1
Roma	1990–91		30	1
Roma	1991–92		33	0
Roma	1992–93		9	0
Roma	1993–94		32	1
Roma	1994–95		30	0
Roma	1995–96		29	0
Roma	1996–97		23	1
Valencia	1997–98		29	0
Valencia	1998–99		36	0
Valencia	1999–2000		28	1
Valencia	2000–01		24	0
Valencia	2001–02		33	0
Valencia	2002–03		29	0
Valencia	2003–04		33	0
Valencia	2004–05		28	0
Valencia	2005–06		5	0

=== International ===
Appearances and goals by national team and year
National team	Year	Apps	Goals
Italy	1992	2	0
Italy	1994	1	0
Italy	1995	6	0
Italy	1996	7	0
Italy	1997	2	0
Total		18	0

== Honours ==
Sampdoria

- Coppa Italia: 1988–89
- UEFA Cup Winners' Cup: 1989–90

Roma

- Coppa Italia: 1990–91

Valencia

- La Liga: 2001–02, 2003–04
- Copa del Rey: 1998–99
- Supercopa de España: 1999
- UEFA Cup: 2003–04
- UEFA Super Cup: 2004
- UEFA Intertoto Cup: 1998

Preceded by Giuseppe Giannini	AS Roma captain 1997–1998	Succeeded by Abel Balbo
