= Luis Milla (footballer, born 1966) =

Spanish footballer and manager

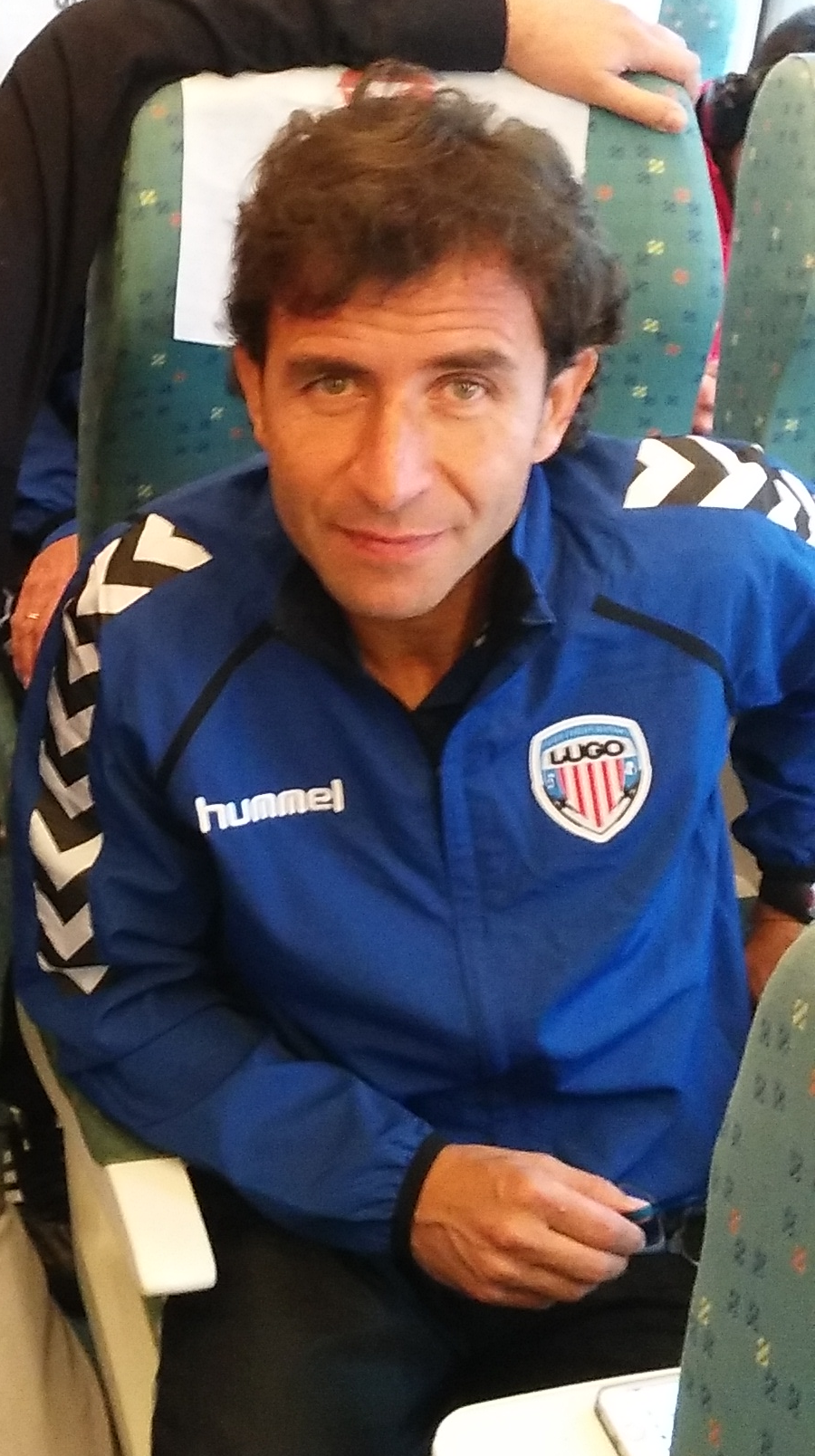
- Milla as Lugo manager in 2015

Personal information
- Full name: Luis Milla Aspas
- Date of birth: 12 March 1966 (age 60)
- Place of birth: Teruel, Spain
- Height: 1.73 m (5 ft 8 in)
- Position: Defensive midfielder

Youth career
- 1979–1981: Colegio La Salle
- 1981–1982: Las Viñas Teruel
- 1982–1983: Teruel
- 1983–1984: Barcelona

Senior career*
Years	Team	Apps	(Gls)
1984–1986	Barcelona C	52	(2)
1984–1990	Barcelona	54	(2)
1986–1988	Barcelona B	40	(5)
1990–1997	Real Madrid	165	(3)
1997–2001	Valencia	79	(1)
Total		390	(13)

International career
1989–1990	Spain	3	(0)

Managerial career
- 2006–2007: Puçol
- 2007–2008: Getafe (assistant)
- 2008–2009: Spain U17
- 2009–2010: Spain U19
- 2009: Spain U20
- 2010–2012: Spain U21
- 2012: Spain U23
- 2013: Al Jazira
- 2015–2016: Lugo
- 2016: Zaragoza
- 2017–2018: Indonesia
- 2017–2018: Indonesia U23
- 2022–2023: Persib Bandung
Medal record
Men's football
Representing Spain (as manager)
UEFA European Under-19 Championship
Runner-up	2010
UEFA European Under-21 Championship
Winner	2011
- * Club domestic league appearances and goals

Luis Milla Aspas (born 12 March 1966) is a Spanish former footballer who played as a defensive midfielder, currently a manager.

He represented three clubs – including Barcelona and Real Madrid – in a 16-year-professional career, where he won three La Liga titles (one with the former and two with the latter) and amassed totals of 298 matches and six goals.

Milla later worked as a manager, being in charge of Spain's youth teams for several years.

== Playing career ==
Milla was born in Teruel, Aragon. After finishing his development with Barcelona, he made his La Liga debut in 1984–85, scoring in his only appearance of the season against Real Zaragoza as Barça pitched in a team majorly composed of youth players due to a general professional's strike.

Definitely promoted to the first team in 1988, Milla would be involved two years later in a sour contract renewal dispute with the board of directors and manager Johan Cruyff, which eventually finished with his free transfer to Real Madrid. He was seriously injured in his debut campaign, but bounced to back to be an important first-team element in the claiming of two leagues and one Copa del Rey, being fairly utilised even after the 1994 purchase of Fernando Redondo.

Milla finished his career in June 2001 after four years at Valencia, with more than 400 official appearances as a professional. Over a three-month period beginning in late 1989, he earned himself three caps for the Spain national team, the first against Hungary in a 1990 FIFA World Cup qualifier.

== Coaching career ==
Milla was first involved in professional coaching in 2007–08, assisting former Barcelona and Madrid teammate Michael Laudrup at Getafe. In the ensuing summer, he was named the national under-17's manager after Vicente del Bosque's appointment at the senior side.

At the 2009 UEFA European Under-19 Championship, Milla's team did not progress through the group stage. In the 2010 edition in France, however, he led Spain to the final, which ended in defeat to the hosts.

Later that year, Milla replaced Juan Ramón López Caro at the helm of the under-21 side. Despite finding a delicate situation upon his arrival, he managed to qualify for the 2011 European championship after defeating Croatia in a two-legged play-off.

In the final stages in Denmark, Milla led the Spanish under-21s to their third title, after only conceding two goals in five games (four wins and one draw). He was sacked after his team failed to qualify from the group phase at the 2012 Summer Olympics.

In February 2013, Milla was appointed at UAE Pro League's Al Jazira. His first match in charge was a 3–1 loss at Tractor in the group stage of the AFC Champions League.

Milla returned to Spain in the 2015 off-season, signing as Segunda División club Lugo head coach and resigning in late February 2016 in unclear circumstances. The following season, in the same capacity, he joined Zaragoza also at that level, being dismissed after only four months in charge and six matches without a win.

On 21 January 2017, Milla succeeded Alfred Riedl at the helm of the Indonesia national team by signing a two-year deal. In October 2018, he had his contract terminated by the Football Association of Indonesia.

On 19 August 2022, Milla was announced as the new manager of Persib Bandung. On 15 July 2023, he left for personal reasons.

== Personal life ==
Milla's son, also named Luis, is also a footballer and a midfielder. On 28 November 2017, the latter scored in a 2–2 draw at Real Madrid in the round of 32 of the Copa del Rey, achieving this feat at the Santiago Bernabéu Stadium 24 years after his father.

== Managerial statistics ==
As of match played 14 July 2023

Managerial record by team and tenure
Team	From	To	Record					Ref
Team	From	To	P	W	D	L	Win %	Ref
Puçol	1 July 2006	30 June 2007	42	14	9	19	33.3	
Spain U19	1 August 2008	5 July 2010	17	11	1	5	64.7	
Spain U20	25 September 2009	5 October 2009	4	3	0	1	75.0	
Spain U21	1 August 2010	7 August 2012	20	15	4	1	75.0	
Spain U23	1 July 2012	7 August 2012	3	0	1	2	0.0	
Al Jazira	23 February 2013	25 October 2013	6	1	2	3	16.7	
Lugo	1 July 2015	24 February 2016	28	9	12	7	32.1	
Zaragoza	1 July 2016	23 October 2016	12	3	4	5	25.0	
Indonesia	20 January 2017	24 August 2018	8	3	2	3	37.5	
Indonesia U23	20 January 2017	24 August 2018	30	13	7	10	43.3	
Persib Bandung	19 August 2022	15 July 2023	30	17	7	6	56.7	
Total			200	89	49	62	44.5	—

== Honours ==
=== Player ===
Barcelona

- La Liga: 1984–85
- Copa del Rey: 1989–90
- European Cup Winners' Cup: 1988–89

Real Madrid

- La Liga: 1994–95, 1996–97
- Copa del Rey: 1992–93
- Supercopa de España: 1993

Valencia

- Copa del Rey: 1998–99
- UEFA Intertoto Cup: 1998
- UEFA Champions League runner-up: 1999–2000, 2000–01

=== Manager ===
Spain U21

- UEFA European Under-21 Championship: 2011

Spain U19

- UEFA European Under-19 Championship runner-up: 2010
