= Gerard López =

Spanish footballer and manager

Gerard
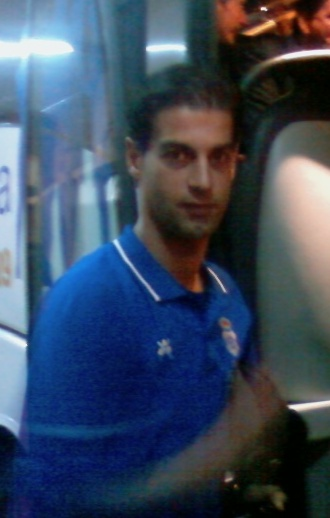
- Gerard as a Recreativo player in 2008

Personal information
- Full name: Gerard López Segú
- Date of birth: 12 March 1979 (age 47)
- Place of birth: Granollers, Spain
- Height: 1.82 m (6 ft 0 in)
- Position: Midfielder

Team information
- Current team: Catalonia (manager)

Youth career
- 1989–1993: Granollers
- 1993–1996: Barcelona

Senior career*
| Years | Team | Apps | (Gls) |
| 1996–1997 | Barcelona B | 32 | (10) |
| 1997–2000 | Valencia | 45 | (4) |
| 1998–1999 | → Alavés (loan) | 29 | (7) |
| 2000–2005 | Barcelona | 91 | (5) |
| 2005–2007 | Monaco | 13 | (1) |
| 2007–2008 | Recreativo | 18 | (0) |
| 2009–2011 | Girona | 31 | (4) |
| Total | | 259 | (31) |

International career
| 1996–1998 | Spain U18 | 9 | (5) |
| 1997 | Spain U20 | 4 | (0) |
| 1998–2000 | Spain U21 | 10 | (5) |
| 2000 | Spain | 6 | (2) |
| 1998–2008 | Catalonia | 6 | (2) |

Managerial career
- 2013–2016: Catalonia
- 2015–2018: Barcelona B
- 2018–: Catalonia
- * Club domestic league appearances and goals

Gerard López Segú (Catalan pronunciation: [ʒəˈɾaɾt ˈlɔpəθ səˈɣu]; born 12 March 1979), usually known as just Gerard, is a Spanish former professional footballer, currently manager of the Catalonia national team. An all-around midfielder, he was known for precision passes and ball control skills. During his career, he played for several clubs, including Barcelona and Valencia, helping the latter to reach the 2000 Champions League final.

Over nine seasons, Gerard amassed La Liga totals of 183 matches and 16 goals. He participated with Spain at Euro 2000.

== Club career ==
=== Barcelona and Valencia ===
Born in Granollers, Barcelona, Catalonia, Gerard began his career in the FC Barcelona youth system and, in the 1996–97 season, made his professional debut with its B team. As a 17-year-old he was signed by Valencia CF, making his La Liga debut on 31 August 1997 in a 2–1 away loss against RCD Mallorca (90 minutes played); for the 1998–99 campaign he was loaned to Deportivo Alavés, which had returned to the top flight after a four-decade absence.

After a breakout season with the Basque side, scoring a squad-best seven goals, Gerard returned to Valencia, helping them to reach the final of the UEFA Champions League. During this time with the Che, he came to be regarded as one of the top players in Spain and, after receiving interest from several top clubs in Europe, including Inter Milan, A.C. Milan and Manchester United, he decided to join his former club Barcelona in July 2000, in a deal worth €24 million; when he netted three times for Valencia against SS Lazio on 5 April 2000, he became the youngest player ever to achieve this feat in the knockout stages of the Champions League.

Gerard would go on to appear regularly for the team during his five-year second spell, although never an undisputed starter. Injuries also began to curtail his career.

=== Monaco and retirement ===
After leaving Barça with the 2005 national championship, Gerard moved abroad, spending two unassuming seasons with France's AS Monaco FC, also being severely injured. He returned to Spain for 2007–08, with top-division Recreativo de Huelva.

After rejecting a move to PAOK FC, Gerard trained for a few months with lowly EC Granollers, in Preferent Territorial de Catalunya. In mid-February 2009 he moved back to Catalonia, joining Girona FC until the end of the campaign; shortly after arriving he was injured again, but managed to score four goals in only six Segunda División games.

== International career ==
After a spectacular 1999–00 season with Valencia, on both fronts, Gerard earned his first cap for Spain on 3 June 2000, in a 1–1 friendly with Sweden in Gothenburg. He went on to play a further five matches, being selected for UEFA Euro 2000.

== Coaching career ==
In October 2013, Gerard replaced Johan Cruyff as manager of Catalonia. On 22 July 2015, he was appointed at Barcelona B after their relegation to Segunda División B.

At the end of the 2016–17 season, Gerard coached his team back to the second tier. Subsequently, he renewed his contract for another year.

On 25 April 2018, with the side placed inside the relegation zone, Gerard was relieved of his duties.

== Personal life ==
Gerard's older brothers, Sergi and Julià López Segú (commonly known as Juli, born 1969), were also footballers, and defenders. The former, who also represented Barcelona, died by suicide at 39.

The latter played almost exclusively for Barça B whilst they were in division two, also having a brief top-flight spell (13 matches) with Real Valladolid, in 1993–94.

== Career statistics ==
Scores and results list Spain's goal tally first, score column indicates score after each Gerard goal.

List of international goals scored by Gerard
| No. | Date | Venue | Opponent | Score | Result | Competition |
|---|---|---|---|---|---|---|
| 1 | 2 September 2000 | Koševo, Sarajevo, Bosnia and Herzegovina | Bosnia and Herzegovina | 1–0 | 2–1 | 2002 World Cup qualification |
| 2 | 7 October 2000 | Santiago Bernabéu, Madrid, Spain | Israel | 1–0 | 2–0 | 2002 World Cup qualification |

== Managerial statistics ==
As of 22 April 2018

Managerial record by team and tenure
| Team | Nat | From | To | Record | | | | | | | | Ref |
| Team | Nat | From | To | G | W | D | L | GF | GA | GD | Win % | Ref |
|---|---|---|---|---|---|---|---|---|---|---|---|---|
| Barcelona B | (Spain) | 22 July 2015 | 25 April 2018 | 118 | 49 | 31 | 38 | 169 | 122 | +47 | 41.53 | |
| Total | | | | 118 | 49 | 31 | 38 | 169 | 122 | +47 | 41.53 | — |

== Honours ==
Valencia

- Supercopa de España: 1999
- UEFA Champions League runner-up: 1999–2000

Barcelona

- La Liga: 2004–05
