= Jocelyn Angloma =

French football manager (born 1965)

Personal information
- Full name: Jocelyn Angloma
- Date of birth: 7 August 1965 (age 61)
- Place of birth: Les Abymes, Guadeloupe, France
- Height: 1.79 m (5 ft 10 in)
- Position: Right-back

Youth career
- 1978–1985: L'Etoile de Morne-à-l'Eau

Senior career*
Years	Team	Apps	(Gls)
1985–1987	Rennes	37	(1)
1987–1990	Lille	92	(13)
1990–1991	Paris Saint-Germain	35	(6)
1991–1994	Marseille	86	(3)
1994–1996	Torino	59	(7)
1996–1997	Inter Milan	30	(1)
1997–2002	Valencia	121	(5)
2003–2007	L'Etoile de Morne-à-l'Eau		
Total		460	(36)

International career
1985	Guadeloupe	2	(0)
1990–1996	France	37	(1)
2006–2007	Guadeloupe	14	(4)

Managerial career
- 2009–2015: L'Etoile de Morne-à-l'Eau
- 2017–: Guadeloupe
- * Club domestic league appearances and goals

Jocelyn Angloma (born 7 August 1965) is a French football manager and former professional player who played as a defender. Born in Guadeloupe, he represented both the France and Guadeloupe national teams.

== Club career ==
Angloma began his professional football career in France, and was a member of the Marseille team which won the 1992–93 UEFA Champions League. He played more than 400 games in European first divisions, including spells in Italy, and 120 appearances with Valencia in Spain, where he played until his retirement in 2002. He played in the UEFA Champions League Finals of 2000 and 2001 for the Spanish club, but was on the losing side on both occasions.

== International career ==
=== France ===
Angloma played 37 times for France between 1990 and 1996, scoring one goal. Angloma was part of the squad at Euro 92 and Euro 96.

=== Guadeloupe ===
As a native of Guadeloupe, Angloma was eligible to play for its national team, making his debut for them as a teenager in the mid-1980s, and being a member of the Guadeloupe team that participated in the 1985 CFU Championship, playing in the final match of the tournament against Suriname on 29 June 1985, aged 20, which ended in a 2–2 draw. It was not until 21 years later, in 2006, that Angloma played another match for Guadeloupe, which he helped qualify for the 2007 Caribbean Nations Cup. He was only allowed to represent them because Guadeloupe is not a FIFA member and only participates in regional competitions. After his return from retirement, Angloma moved from his natural position as a right-back and played as a midfield playmaker for Guadeloupe.

In total, Angloma played 14 matches for Guadeloupe in 2006 and 2007, scoring 4 goals, the last of which in a 2–1 win over Honduras on 17 June 2007, becoming, at the age of 41 years and 314 days, the second-oldest international goalscorer in world football, only behind Roger Milla, who had scored for Cameroon in 1994, at the age of 42.

In December 2017, he was appointed Guadeloupe's coach.

== Personal life ==
Jocelyn Angloma's son Johan plays in several youth teams of Guadeloupe and was a member of the Guadeloupe under-14 national football team at the Coupe National Under-14 2008.

== Career statistics ==
=== Club ===
Appearances and goals by club, season and competition
Club	Season	League			Cup (Note: Includes Coupe de France, Coppa Italia, Copa del Rey, Supercopa de España)		Continental (Note: Includes UEFA Champions League, UEFA Cup, UEFA Intertoto Cup)		Total	
Club	Season	Division	Apps	Goals	Apps	Goals	Apps	Goals	Apps	Goals
Rennes	1985–86	Division 1	6	0	–		–		6	0
Rennes	1986–87	Division 1	31	1	–		–		31	1
Rennes	Total		37	1	0	0	0	0	37	1
Lille	1987–88	Division 1	32	3	–		–		32	3
Lille	1988–89	Division 1	26	3	–		–		26	3
Lille	1989–90	Division 1	34	7	–		–		34	7
Lille	Total		92	13	0	0	0	0	92	13
Paris Saint-Germain	1990–91	Division 1	35	6	–		–		35	6
Marseille	1991–92	Division 1	32	2	–		4	1	36	1
Marseille	1992–93	Division 1	31	1	2	0	9	0	42	1
Marseille	1993–94	Division 1	23	0	2	0	–		25	0
Marseille	Total		86	3	4	0	13	1	103	4
Torino	1994–95	Serie A	28	4	1	1	–		29	5
Torino	1995–96	Serie A	31	3	1	0	–		32	3
Torino	Total		59	7	2	1	0	0	61	8
Inter Milan	1996–97	Serie A	30	1	6	0	10	2	46	3
Valencia	1997–98	Primera División	32	3	5	1	–		37	4
Valencia	1998–99	Primera División	29	1	6	1	7	0	42	2
Valencia	1999–00	Primera División	30	1	2	0	16	0	48	1
Valencia	2000–01	Primera División	27	0	1	0	18	1	46	1
Valencia	2001–02	Primera División	3	0	–		1	0	4	0
Valencia	Total		121	5	14	2	42	1	177	8
Career total			460	36	26	3	65	4	551	43

=== International ===
Appearances and goals by national team and year
National team	Year	Apps	Goals
Guadeloupe	1985	1	2
Guadeloupe	Total	1	2
France	1990	2	0
France	1991	4	0
France	1992	6	0
France	1993	2	0
France	1994	8	0
France	1995	7	0
France	1996	8	1
France	Total	37	1
Guadeloupe	2006	3	1
Guadeloupe	2007	11	3
Guadeloupe	Total	14	4
Career total		52	7

Angloma's team's score listed first, score column indicates score after each Angloma goal.

List of international goals scored by Jocelyn Angloma
No.	Team	Date	Venue	Opponent	Score	Result	Competition	Ref.
1	Guadeloupe	30 June 1985	Bridgetown, Barbados	Suriname	–	2–2	1985 CFU Championship	
2	Guadeloupe	30 June 1985	Bridgetown, Barbados	Suriname	–	2–2	1985 CFU Championship	
3	France	5 June 1996	Stade Grimonprez-Jooris, Lille, France	Armenia	1–0	2–0	Friendly	
4	Guadeloupe	24 November 2006	Bourda, Georgetown, Guyana	Dominican Republic	1–0	3–0	2007 Caribbean Cup	
5	Guadeloupe	14 January 2007	Manny Ramjohn Stadium, Marabella, Trinidad and Tobago	Cuba	2–1	2–1	2007 Caribbean Cup	
6	Guadeloupe	9 June 2007	Miami Orange Bowl, Miami, United States	Canada	1–0	2–1	2007 CONCACAF Gold Cup	
7	Guadeloupe	17 June 2007	Reliant Stadium, Houston, United States	Honduras	1–0	2–1	2007 CONCACAF Gold Cup	

== Managerial statistics ==
As of matches played 24 June 2025

Managerial record by team and tenure
Team	From	To	Record								Ref
Team	From	To	G	W	D	L	GF	GA	GD	Win %	Ref
L'Etoile de Morne-à-l'Eau	2009	2015	209	100	69	40	282	158	+124	47.85	
Guadeloupe	2017	2026	54	28	4	22	94	57	+37	51.85	
Career totals			263	128	73	62	376	215	+161	48.67	

== Honours ==
Marseille

- Division 1: 1991–92
- UEFA Champions League: 1992–93

Inter Milan

- UEFA Cup runner-up: 1996–97

Valencia

- La Liga: 2001–02
- Copa del Rey: 1998–99
- Supercopa de España: 1999
- UEFA Champions League runner-up: 1999–2000, 2000–01
- UEFA Intertoto Cup: 1998

France U21

- UEFA European Under-21 Championship: 1988

Individual

- UEFA European Championship Team of the Tournament: 1992
- ESM Team of the Year: 1996–97, 1999–2000, 2000–01
- CONCACAF Gold Cup All-Tournament team (Honorable Mention): 2007
