= Javier Farinós =

Spanish footballer (born 1978)

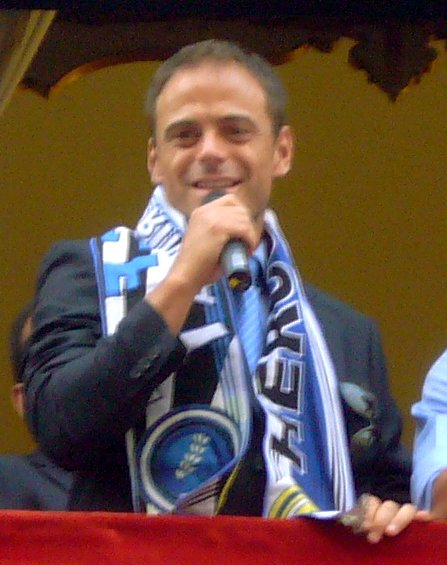
- Farinós celebrates promotion to La Liga in 2010

Personal information
- Full name: Francisco Javier Farinós Zapata
- Date of birth: 29 March 1978 (age 48)
- Place of birth: Valencia, Spain
- Height: 1.73 m (5 ft 8 in)
- Position: Midfielder

Youth career
- Valencia

Senior career*
Years	Team	Apps	(Gls)
1996–1997	Valencia B	17	(3)
1996–2000	Valencia	115	(10)
2000–2005	Inter Milan	49	(2)
2003	→ Villarreal (loan)	22	(2)
2004–2005	→ Mallorca (loan)	29	(3)
2005–2006	Mallorca	17	(1)
2006–2011	Hércules	146	(22)
2011–2012	Levante	30	(1)
2012–2014	Villarreal	11	(1)
Total		436	(45)

International career
1993–1994	Spain U16	12	(1)
1995–1996	Spain U18	15	(2)
1997	Spain U20	6	(2)
1998–2000	Spain U21	11	(3)
1999–2000	Spain	2	(0)
- * Club domestic league appearances and goals

Francisco Javier Farinós Zapata (born 29 March 1978) is a Spanish former professional footballer who played as a midfielder.

He amassed La Liga totals of 225 games and 18 goals over ten seasons, mainly in representation of Valencia (four years), Villarreal and Mallorca (two apiece). He added 145 matches and 22 goals in Segunda División almost exclusively with Hércules, and also spent several years under contract to Inter Milan, being often loaned.

== Club career ==
=== Valencia ===
A versatile midfielder, Farinós was born in Valencia and made his professional debut as an 18-year-old, with hometown's Valencia CF. He was an undisputed starter from 1997 to 2000, helping the Che to the 1999 Copa del Rey and Supercopa de España and scoring five La Liga goals in his final season; to finish his career with the club he appeared in the campaign's UEFA Champions League final, a 3–0 loss against Real Madrid.

=== Inter Milan ===
In the summer of 2000, Farinós caught the attention of Serie A's Inter Milan, where he would spend five years (with a Villarreal CF loan in between) without much success. He was out of action for 15 months due to injury, and was only able to pitch in ten league games as his team lost the 2001–02 league title in the last matchday; he did manage, however, to score in a 6–0 home rout of Reggina Calcio on 22 November 2003, under head coach Alberto Zaccheroni.

On 21 March 2002, Farinós returned to the Mestalla Stadium in the quarter-finals of the UEFA Cup: after Francesco Toldo was sent off, he was the player chosen to replace him in goal in an eventual 1–0 win (2–1 on aggregate).

Farinós returned to Spain for 2004–05, joining RCD Mallorca initially on loan. He was relatively used during two top flight seasons – mainly in the first, as the Balearic Islands side could only finish 17th.

=== Hércules ===
In 2006–07, after being released by Mallorca and having an unsuccessful trial with Charlton Athletic in England, Farinós joined Hércules CF in Segunda División. He was an undisputed starter when healthy, netting 15 times in the league alone in his three seasons combined; in his third year the Alicante club finished in fourth position with 78 points, all-time best without actually promoting.

Farinós played nearly 3,000 minutes in 2009–10, scoring six goals in 34 games as Hércules returned to the first division after 13 years. He spent the vast majority of the following campaign, however, sidelined due to injury; on 29 January 2011, in his return to action, as a second-half substitute in a 3–0 home loss against FC Barcelona, he was sent off shortly after two bookable offenses; in his second appearance, at home against Real Zaragoza, he helped the hosts come from behind to win it 2–1, scoring the equaliser ten minutes from time and assisting David Trezeguet in the 89th minute-winner.

=== Later career ===
In late June 2011, following Hércules' relegation, 33-year-old Farinós agreed to a one-year contract with Levante UD, making this the fourth major club he represented in the Valencian Community. In December of the following year he returned to Villarreal, with the team in the second level; he contributed with 11 appearances (eight starts, 695 minutes of action and a goal in a 1–1 draw at former club Hércules) to help the latter return to the top flight after one year out.

On 11 February 2014, after another lengthy spell on the sidelines due to injury, now in the Achilles tendon of his right leg Farinós announced his retirement from football.

== International career ==
Courtesy of his Valencia performances, Farinós earned his first cap for Spain on 18 August 1999, in a 2–1 friendly win against Poland in Warsaw, being replaced by teammate Gaizka Mendieta at half-time. He added a second a year later with the Netherlands, also in an exhibition game.

Previously, Farinós competed in the 1997 FIFA World Youth Championship.

== Honours ==
Valencia

- Copa del Rey: 1998–99
- Supercopa de España: 1999
- UEFA Intertoto Cup: 1998
- UEFA Champions League runner-up: 1999–2000

Inter

- Supercoppa Italiana runner-up: 2000
