= 2003–04 Valencia CF season =

Valencia
2003–04 season
- President: Jaume Orti
- Manager: Rafael Benítez
- Stadium: Mestalla
- La Liga: 1st
- Copa del Rey: Quarter-finals
- UEFA Cup: Winners
- Top goalscorer: League: Mista (19); All: Mista (24)
Home colours	Away colours

During the 2003–04 Spanish football season, Valencia won the double of La Liga and the UEFA Cup. At the end of the season, manager Rafael Benítez left to manage English side Liverpool and was succeeded by former Chelsea, Fiorentina and Valencia manager Claudio Ranieri.

Valencia CF enjoyed a marvellous season by winning the La Liga and UEFA Cup double. The key players of the squad were Mista, Vicente Rodríguez, Francisco Rufete, David Albelda, Roberto Ayala, Fábio Aurélio, Amedeo Carboni and Mauricio Pellegrino. Valencia started the league well in the early season, but slumped in the mid-season and later made a remarkable comeback (remontada) in April and May thanks to Real Madrid's several slips. Valencia were on course for their first-treble winning season, however, Valencia were eliminated by eventual Copa del Rey runners-up Real Madrid in the quarter-finals and thus denying them a season treble.

== Overview ==
Competition	Record								Result	Top Scorer
Competition	G	W	D	L	GF	GA	GD	Win %	Result	Top Scorer
La Liga	38	23	8	7	71	27	+44	60.53	Winners	(Spain) Mista, 19
Copa del Rey	6	3	1	2	10	8	+2	50.00	Quarter-finals	(Spain) Rubén Baraja, 3
UEFA Cup	13	10	2	1	20	5	+15	76.92	Winners	(Spain) Mista, 5
Total	57	36	11	10	101	40	+61	63.16		(Spain) Mista, 24

== Squad ==
Squad at end of season

Note: Flags indicate national team as defined under FIFA eligibility rules; some limited exceptions apply. Players may hold more than one non-FIFA nationality.

No.	Pos.	Nation	Player
1	GK	ESP	Santiago Cañizares
2	DF	ARG	Mauricio Pellegrino
3	DF	BRA	Fábio Aurélio
4	DF	ARG	Roberto Ayala
5	DF	ESP	Carlos Marchena
6	MF	ESP	David Albelda
7	FW	BRA	Ricardo Oliveira
8	MF	ESP	Rubén Baraja
10	FW	ESP	Miguel Ángel Angulo
11	FW	ESP	Juan Sánchez
12	DF	ESP	Javier Garrido
13	GK	ESP	Andrés Palop
14	MF	ESP	Vicente
15	DF	ITA	Amedeo Carboni
16	MF	URU	Fabián Canobbio
17	DF	ESP	David Navarro

No.	Pos.	Nation	Player
18	MF	ESP	Jorge López
19	MF	ESP	Francisco Rufete
20	FW	ESP	Mista
21	MF	ARG	Pablo Aimar
23	DF	ESP	Curro Torres
24	MF	ESP	Xisco
25	MF	MLI	Mohamed Sissoko
26	MF	ESP	Jaime Gavilán
28	GK	ESP	David Rangel
29	FW	ESP	Borja Criado
31	DF	ESP	Vicente Verdejo
33	GK	ESP	Jonathan
35	DF	PAR	Ángel Amarilla
36	DF	FRA	Jean-Félix Dorothée
38	MF	ESP	César Soriano
39	DF	ESP	Raúl Albiol

=== Transfers ===
In
Pos.	Name	from	Type
FW	Ricardo Oliveira	Santos	€3,50 million
MF	Jorge López	Villarreal	€4,00 million
MF	Mohamed Sissoko	Auxerre	€1,00 million
MF	Xisco	Recreativo	loan ended
AM	Fabián Canobbio	Peñarol	Free
DF	Raul Albiol	Valencia B	

Out
Pos.	Name	To	Type
FW	John Carew	Roma	loan
MF	Kily González	Internazionale	€2,5 million
FW	Salva	Málaga	loan
DF	Miroslav Đukić	Tenerife	Free
DF	Anthony Réveillère	Lyon	loan ended
DF	Jean-Félix Dorothée	Valencia B	
MF	Dennis Șerban	Poli Ejido	end of contract
MF	Gonzalo de los Santos	Atlético Madrid	loan
DF	Raul Albiol	Recreativo	loan

== Competitions ==
=== La Liga ===
==== League table ====
Pos	Team	Pld	W	D	L	GF	GA	GD	Pts	Qualification or relegation
1	Valencia (C)	38	23	8	7	71	27	+44	77	Qualification for the Champions League group stage
2	Barcelona	38	21	9	8	63	39	+24	72	Qualification for the Champions League group stage
3	Deportivo La Coruña	38	21	8	9	60	34	+26	71	Qualification for the Champions League third qualifying round
4	Real Madrid	38	21	7	10	72	54	+18	70	Qualification for the Champions League third qualifying round
5	Athletic Bilbao	38	15	11	12	53	49	+4	56	Qualification for the UEFA Cup first round

Source: LFP
Rules for classification: 1st points; 2nd head-to-head points; 3rd head-to-head goal difference; 4th head-to-head goals scored; 5th goal difference; 6th number of goals scored; 7th Fair-play points
(C) Champions

==== Results by round ====
Round	1	2	3	4	5	6	7	8	9	10	11	12	13	14	15	16	17	18	19	20	21	22	23	24	25	26	27	28	29	30	31	32	33	34	35	36	37	38
Ground	H	A	H	A	H	A	H	A	H	A	H	A	H	A	H	A	H	H	A	A	H	A	H	A	H	A	H	A	H	A	H	A	H	A	H	A	A	H
Result	D	W	W	W	W	W	W	L	D	W	L	D	W	D	W	W	W	W	W	D	L	W	W	D	L	L	W	W	W	W	W	W	D	D	W	W	L	L
Position	10	7	4	3	1	1	1	3	3	1	2	3	1	2	2	2	2	2	1	1	2	2	2	2	2	2	2	2	2	2	2	1	1	1	1	1	1	1

Updated to match(es) played on 2008-07-16. Source: LFP.com
A = Away; H = Home; W = Win; D = Draw; L = Loss; = Leader, 2004–05 UEFA Champions League Group stage; = 2004–05 UEFA Champions League Group stage; = 2004–05 UEFA Champions League Qualifying round; = 2004–05 UEFA Cup; = 2004–05 Segunda División

==== Matches ====
All kickoff times are in CET/CEST. Win Draw Loss

30 August 2003 1	Valencia	1–1	Real Valladolid	Valencia
21:30	Aimar 76'		Sousa 20'	Stadium: Mestalla; Attendance: 45,000; Referee: Rafael Ramírez Domínguez

2 September 2003 2	Osasuna	0–1	Valencia	Pamplona
21:30			Baraja 50'	Stadium: El Sadar; Attendance: 14,195; Referee: Julián Rodríguez Santiago

14 September 2003 3	Valencia	1–0	Málaga	Valencia
19:00	Marchena 43'			Stadium: Mestalla; Attendance: 45,000; Referee: Alfonso Pérez Burrull

20 September 2003 4	Atlético Madrid	0–3	Valencia	Madrid
21:30			Vicente 67'; Mista 75', 90'	Stadium: Vicente Calderón; Attendance: 53,000; Referee: Fernando Carmona Méndez

27 September 2003 5	Valencia	2–0	Real Madrid	Valencia
21:30	Mista 4'; Oliveira 71'			Stadium: Mestalla; Attendance: 50,000; Referee: Xavier Moreno Delgado

5 October 2003 6	Barcelona	0-1	Valencia	Barcelona
21:30			Oliveira 14'	Stadium: Camp Nou; Attendance: 78,019; Referee: César Muñiz Fernández

19 October 2003 7	Valencia	4–0	Espanyol	Valencia
17:30	Mista 7', 45'; Baraja 44'; Vicente 78'			Stadium: Mestalla; Attendance: 45,000; Referee: Luis Medina Cantalejo

25 October 2003 8	Deportivo La Coruña	2-1	Valencia	A Coruña
21:30	Valerón 16'; Tristán 80'		Mista 73'	Stadium: Riazor; Attendance: 27,500; Referee: Alberto Undiano Mallenco

29 October 2003 9	Valencia	2-2	Celta Vigo	Valencia
21:00	Aimar 41'; Canobbio 68'		Berizzo 56'; Jesuli 66'	Stadium: Mestalla; Attendance: 48,000; Referee: Alfonso Pino Zamorano

2 November 2003 10	Mallorca	0–5	Valencia	Palma
			Jorge López 2' (pen.); Oliveira 7', 45', 76'; Xisco 88'	Stadium: Son Moix; Attendance: 21,330; Referee: Eduardo Iturralde González

9 November 2003 11	Valencia	1–2	Racing Santander	Valencia
	Baraja 25'		Bodipo 23', 49'	Stadium: Mestalla; Attendance: 45,000; Referee: Miguel Pérez Lasa

23 November 2003 12	Murcia	2–2	Valencia	Murcia
	Richi 38'; Míchel 46'		Mista 12', 55'	Stadium: La Condomina; Attendance: 12,800; Referee: Víctor Esquinas Torres

29 November 2003 13	Valencia	3–2	Real Zaragoza	Valencia
	Jorge López 19'; Vicente 26'; Aimar 44'		Villa 49'; Cani 79'	Stadium: Mestalla; Attendance: 45,000; Referee: Antonio Rubinos Pérez

2 December 2003 14	Real Sociedad	0–0	Valencia	San Sebastián
				Stadium: Anoeta; Attendance: 22,000; Referee: Evaristo Puentes Leira

7 December 2003 15	Valencia	2–1	Athletic Bilbao	Valencia
	Vicente 17', 64'		Ezquerro 52'	Stadium: Mestalla; Attendance: 45,000; Referee: Arturo Daudén Ibáñez

14 December 2003 16	Real Betis	0–1	Valencia	Seville
			Juanito 18' (o.g.)	Stadium: Manuel Ruiz de Lopera; Attendance: 40,000; Referee: Fernando Teixeira Vitienes

20 December 2003 17	Valencia	1–0	Sevilla	Valencia
	Mista 61'			Stadium: Mestalla; Attendance: 47,700; Referee: José Losantos Omar

4 January 2004 18	Valencia	4–2	Villarreal	Valencia
	Baraja 60', 73'; Aimar 61'; Mista 87'		Riquelme 14'; Belletti 77'	Stadium: Mestalla; Attendance: 45,000; Referee: Pedro Tristante Oliva

10 January 2004 19	Albacete	0–1	Valencia	Albacete
			Jorge López 9' (pen.)	Stadium: Carlos Belmonte; Attendance: 17,300; Referee: Javier Moreno Delgado

17 January 2004 20	Valladolid	0–0	Valencia	Valladolid
				Stadium: José Zorrilla; Attendance: 13,200; Referee: Bernardino González Vázquez

25 January 2004 21	Valencia	0–1	Osasuna	Valencia
			Pellegrino 45' (o.g.)	Stadium: Mestalla; Attendance: 47,700; Referee: Carlos Megía Dávila

31 January 2004 22	Málaga	1–6	Valencia	Málaga
	Salva 73'		Mista 5'; Oliveira 15', 58', 65'; Marchena 48'; Albelda 72'	Stadium: La Rosaleda; Attendance: 21,000; Referee: Eduardo Iturralde González

7 February 2004 23	Valencia	3–0	Atlético Madrid	Valencia
19:30	Mista 30', 71'; Vicente 66'			Stadium: Mestalla; Attendance: 45,000; Referee: Javier Turienzo Álvarez

15 February 2004 24	Real Madrid	1–1	Valencia	Madrid
21:00	Figo 90' (pen.)		Ayala 74'	Stadium: Santiago Bernabéu; Attendance: 78,000; Referee: Pedro Tristante Oliva

21 February 2004 25	Valencia	0–1	Barcelona	Valencia
21:30			Gerard 77'	Stadium: Mestalla; Attendance: 53,000; Referee: Antonio Rubinos Pérez

29 February 2004 26	Espanyol	2–1	Valencia	Barcelona
	Tamudo 39', 75'		Mista 77'	Stadium: Estadi Olímpic Lluís Companys; Attendance: 18,900; Referee: Manuel Mejuto González

6 March 2004 27	Valencia	3–0	Deportivo La Coruña	Valencia
	Vicente 22' (pen.), 90'; Sánchez 90'			Stadium: Mestalla; Attendance: 52,000; Referee: José Pedro Mendoza Castellano

14 March 2004 28	Celta Vigo	0–2	Valencia	Vigo
			Rufete 39', 89'	Stadium: Estadio Balaídos; Attendance: 25,076; Referee: Rafael Ramírez Domínguez

21 March 2004 29	Valencia	5–1	Mallorca	Valencia
	Mista 44', 67', 68'; Baraja 56'; Angulo 60'		Eto'o 83' (pen.)	Stadium: Mestalla; Attendance: 47,700; Referee: Jesús Téllez Sánchez

28 March 2004 30	Racing Santander	0–3	Valencia	Santander
			Díaz 8' (o.g.); Vicente 45', 75'	Stadium: El Sardinero; Attendance: 13,781; Referee: César Muñiz Fernández

4 April 2004 31	Valencia	2–0	Murcia	Valencia
	Pellegrino 72'; Mista 82'			Stadium: Mestalla; Attendance: 40,000; Referee: Alberto Undiano Mallenco

11 April 2004 32	Real Zaragoza	0–1	Valencia	Zaragoza
			Angulo 69'	Stadium: La Romareda; Attendance: 35,000; Referee: Alfonso Pérez Burrull

18 April 2004 33	Valencia	2–2	Real Sociedad	Valencia
	Vicente 71'; Mista 86'		Alonso 65'; Karpin 69' (pen.)	Stadium: Mestalla; Attendance: 53,000; Referee: Fernando Teixeira Vitienes

25 April 2004 34	Athletic Bilbao	1–1	Valencia	Bilbao
	del Horno 30'		Jorge López 12' (pen.)	Stadium: San Mamés; Attendance: 36,000; Referee: Javier Turienzo Álvarez

2 May 2004 35	Valencia	2–0	Real Betis	Valencia
	Torres 35'; Baraja 48'			Stadium: Mestalla; Attendance: 45,000; Referee: Bernardino González Vázquez

9 May 2004 36	Sevilla	0–2	Valencia	Seville
			Vicente 11'; Baraja 90'	Stadium: Ramón Sánchez Pizjuán; Attendance: 45,000; Referee: Evaristo Puentes Leira

14 May 2004 37	Villarreal	2–1	Valencia	Villarreal
	Anderson 13'; Riquelme 25'		Pellegrino 35'	Stadium: El Madrigal; Attendance: 11,256; Referee: Luis Medina Cantalejo

23 May 2004 38	Valencia	0–1	Albacete	Valencia
			Aranda 60'	Stadium: Mestalla; Attendance: 50,000; Referee: Manuel Mejuto González

=== Copa del Rey ===
22 October 2003 Round of 64	Castellón	1–3	Valencia	Castellón de la Plana, Valencia
	Marcos 39'		Baraja 63', 81'; Canobbio 86'	Stadium: Nou Estadi Castàlia; Referee: Jesús Téllez Sánchez

17 December 2003 Round of 32	Valencia	2–0	Murcia	Valencia
	Xisco 12'; Garrido 69'			Stadium: Mestalla; Attendance: 15,000; Referee: Rafael Ramírez Domínguez

7 January 2004 Round of 16, First Leg	Valencia	2–2	Osasuna	Valencia
	Angulo 26'; Baraja 53' (pen.)		Webó 59'; Aloisi 89'	Stadium: Mestalla; Attendance: 23,000; Referee: Antonio Rubinos Pérez

14 January 2004 Round of 16, Second Leg	Osasuna	0–2 (2–4 agg.)	Valencia	Pamplona
			Vicente 26'; Rufete 59'	Stadium: El Sadar; Attendance: 14,103; Referee: Miguel Pérez Lasa

==== Quarter-finals ====
21 January 2004	Real Madrid	3-0	Valencia	Madrid
	Raúl 31'; Ronaldo 81'; Figo 86' (pen.)	(Report)		Stadium: Santiago Bernabéu; Attendance: 65,000; Referee: Luis Medina Cantalejo

28 January 2004	Valencia	1–2 (1–5 agg.)	Real Madrid	Valencia
	Xisco 73'	(Report)	Raúl 14'; Zidane 90'	Stadium: Mestalla; Attendance: 42,000; Referee: Fernando Carmona Méndez

=== UEFA Cup ===
==== First round ====
24 September 2003	AIK (Sweden)	0–1	(Spain) Valencia	Råsunda Stadium, Stockholm
20:30		Report	Oliveira 64'	Attendance: 25,433; Referee: Hermann Albrecht (Germany)

15 October 2003	Valencia (Spain)	1–0 (2–0 agg.)	(Sweden) AIK	Mestalla, Valencia
21:45	Mista 71'	Report		Attendance: 20,000; Referee: Johan Verbist (Belgium)

==== Second round ====
6 November 2003	Valencia (Spain)	0–0	(Israel) Maccabi Haifa	Mestalla, Valencia
22:00		Report		Referee: Kenny Clark (Scotland)

11 December 2003	Maccabi Haifa (Israel)	0–4 (0–4 agg.)	(Spain) Valencia	Sparta Stadion, Rotterdam
20:00		Report	Mista 11'; Baraja 24'; Albelda 90+1'; Angulo 90+2'	Referee: Eric Braamhaar (Netherlands)

==== Third round ====
26 February 2004	Valencia (Spain)	3–2	(Turkey) Beşiktaş	Mestalla, Valencia
21:30	Sissoko 25'; Canobbio 43'; Navarro 90+4'	Report	Pancu 17', 39'	Referee: Alain Sars (France)

3 March 2004	(Turkey) Beşiktaş	0–2 (2–5 agg.)	(Spain) Valencia	BJK İnönü Stadium, Istanbul
19:30		Report	Angulo 12'; Juan Sánchez 57'	Referee: Domenico Messina (Italy)

==== Fourth round ====
11 March 2004	Gençlerbirliği (Turkey)	1–0	(Spain) Valencia	Ankara 19 Mayıs Stadium, Ankara
19:30	Daems 12' (pen.)	Report		Attendance: 25,000; Referee: Tom Henning Øvrebø (Norway)

25 March 2004	Valencia (Spain)	2–0 (a.e.t.) (2–1 agg.)	Gençlerbirliği (Turkey)	Mestalla, Valencia
21:30	Mista 63'; Vicente 94'	Report		Attendance: 30,000; Referee: René Temmink (Netherlands)

==== Quarter-final ====
8 April 2004	Bordeaux (France)	1–2	(Spain) Valencia	Stade Chaban-Delmas, Bordeaux
19:15	Riera 18'	Report	Baraja 75'; Rufete 88'	Attendance: 29,108; Referee: Mike Riley (England)

14 April 2004	Valencia (Spain)	2–1 (4–2 agg.)	(France) Bordeaux	Mestalla, Valencia
21:45	Pellegrino 52'; Rufete 60'	Report	Eduardo 71'	Attendance: 32,000; Referee: Herbert Fandel (Germany)

==== Semi-final ====
22 April 2004	Villarreal (Spain)	0–0	(Spain) Valencia	Estadio El Madrigal, Villarreal
21:45		Report		Attendance: 23,000; Referee: Lucílio Batista (Portugal)

6 May 2004	Valencia (Spain)	1–0 (1–0 agg.)	(Spain) Villarreal	Mestalla, Valencia
21:45	Mista 16' (pen.)	Report		Attendance: 52,000; Referee: Terje Hauge (Norway)

==== Final ====
19 May 2004	Valencia (Spain)	2–0	(France) Marseille	Ullevi, Gothenburg
20:45 CEST	Vicente 45' (pen.); Mista 58'	Report		Attendance: 39,000; Referee: Pierluigi Collina (Italy)

== Statistics ==
=== Players statistics ===
No.	Pos	Nat	Player	Total		La Liga		Copa del Rey		UEFA Cup	
No.	Pos	Nat	Player	Apps	Goals	Apps	Goals	Apps	Goals	Apps	Goals
1	GK	(Spain) ESP	Cañizares	44	-27	37	-25	0	0	7	-2
23	DF	(Spain) ESP	Curro Torres	39	1	28+1	1	1+1	0	7+1	0
4	DF	(Argentina) ARG	Ayala	45	1	30	1	5	0	10	0
5	DF	(Spain) ESP	Marchena	44	2	28+3	2	4+1	0	6+2	0
15	DF	(Italy) ITA	Carboni	48	0	33	0	3+1	0	10+1	0
18	MF	(Spain) ESP	López	30	4	23+3	4	0+4	0	0	0
6	MF	(Spain) ESP	Albelda	44	2	32+1	1	2+1	0	8	1
8	MF	(Spain) ESP	Baraja	52	13	29+6	8	5+1	3	10+1	2
14	MF	(Spain) ESP	Vicente	44	15	32+1	12	4	1	4+3	2
20	FW	(Spain) ESP	Mista	46	24	29+4	19	3+1	0	6+3	5
7	FW	(Brazil) BRA	Oliveira	30	9	14+7	8	2+1	0	5+1	1
28	GK	(Spain) ESP	Rangel	1	-2	1	-2	0	0	0	0
21	MF	(Argentina) ARG	Aimar	38	4	18+7	4	3+2	0	5+3	0
19	MF	(Spain) ESP	Rufete	43	5	15+12	2	5	1	8+3	2
2	DF	(Argentina) ARG	Pellegrino	32	3	17+4	2	3	0	6+2	1
10	FW	(Spain) ESP	Angulo	36	5	12+10	2	4+1	1	7+2	2
25	MF	(Mali) MLI	Sissoko	34	1	9+12	0	3+1	0	7+2	1
12	DF	(Spain) ESP	Garrido	31	2	13+2	0	6	1	9+1	1
24	MF	(Spain) ESP	Xisco	33	3	5+17	1	1+2	2	6+2	0
17	DF	(Spain) ESP	Navarro	20	1	7+5	0	2	0	6	1
16	MF	(Uruguay) URU	Cannobio	23	3	3+8	1	2	1	6+4	1
11	FW	(Spain) ESP	Sánchez	17	2	3+7	1	1	0	4+2	1
3	DF	(Brazil) BRA	Fábio Aurélio	4	0	0+2	0	0	0	0+2	0
13	GK	(Spain) ESP	Palop	12	-11	0	0	6	-8	6	-3
26	MF	(Spain) ESP	Gavilan								
29	FW	(Spain) ESP	Criado								
31	DF	(Spain) ESP	Verdejo								
33	GK	(Spain) ESP	Jonathan								
35	DF	(Paraguay) PAR	Amarilla								
36	DF	(France) FRA	Dorothée								
38	MF	(Spain) ESP	Soriano	1	0	0	0	1	0		
39	DF	(Spain) ESP	Albiol	2	0	0	0	0	0	0+2	0

- Source: https://www.bdfutbol.com/en/t/t2003-0436.html?tab=partits
