= 2002–03 Valencia CF season =

Valencia
2002–03 season
- President: Jaime Ortí
- Manager: Rafael Benítez
- Stadium: Mestalla
- La Liga: 5th
- Copa del Rey: Second round
- Supercopa de España: Runners-up
- UEFA Champions League: Quarter-finals
- Top goalscorer: League: Pablo Aimar; Fábio Aurélio; John Carew (8 each); All: John Carew (13)
| Home colours | Away colours |

Valencia did not succeed in defending their La Liga title, slumping to a fifth place finish. Los Che also got to the quarter-finals of the UEFA Champions League, where former coach Héctor Cúper and Inter got the upper hand over Valencia and Rafael Benítez. The main player during the season was Pablo Aimar, who was the only player making waves in the season, where the previously solid defense did not perform as well as it did previously.

== Squad ==
Note: Flags indicate national team as defined under FIFA eligibility rules; some limited exceptions apply. Players may hold more than one non-FIFA nationality.

| No. | Pos. | Nation | Player |
|---|---|---|---|
| 1 | GK | ESP | Santiago Cañizares |
| 2 | DF | ARG | Mauricio Pellegrino |
| 3 | DF | BRA | Fábio Aurélio |
| 4 | DF | ARG | Roberto Ayala |
| 5 | DF | SCG | Miroslav Đukić |
| 6 | MF | ESP | David Albelda |
| 7 | FW | NOR | John Carew |
| 8 | MF | ESP | Rubén Baraja |
| 9 | FW | ESP | Salva |
| 10 | MF | ESP | Angulo |
| 11 | FW | ESP | Juan Sánchez |
| 12 | DF | ESP | Carlos Marchena |
| 13 | GK | ESP | Andrés Palop |
| 14 | MF | ESP | Vicente |
| 15 | DF | ITA | Amedeo Carboni |
| 16 | MF | ROU | Dennis Șerban |
| 17 | DF | FRA | Anthony Réveillère |

| No. | Pos. | Nation | Player |
|---|---|---|---|
| 18 | MF | ARG | Kily González |
| 19 | MF | ESP | Francisco Rufete |
| 20 | FW | ESP | Mista |
| 21 | MF | ARG | Pablo Aimar |
| 22 | MF | URU | Gonzalo de los Santos |
| 23 | DF | ESP | Curro Torres |
| 27 | DF | ESP | David Navarro |
| 28 | GK | ESP | David Rángel |
| 29 | MF | ESP | Ximo Enguix |
| 30 | FW | ESP | Borja Criado |
| 31 | DF | ESP | Miguel Albiol |
| 34 | MF | ESP | Javier Garrido |
| 36 | DF | FRA | Jean-Félix Dorothée |
| 37 | MF | ESP | Pablo Redondo |
| 39 | MF | ESP | Jaime Gavilán |
| 40 | DF | ESP | César Soriano |
| 24 | DF | PAR | Ángel Amarilla |

=== Transfers ===
In
| Pos. | Name | from | Type |
|---|---|---|---|
| DF | Anthony Réveillère | Rennes | loan |
| DF | Jean-Félix Dorothée | Rennes | Free |

Out
| Pos. | Name | To | Type |
|---|---|---|---|
| FW | Adrian Ilie | Alavés | |
| DF | Jocelyn Angloma | L'Étoile | |
| FW | Salva | Bolton Wanderers | |
| MF | Dennis Șerban | Córdoba | |
| DF | Ángel Amarilla | Racing Club | |

== Competitions ==
=== La Liga ===
==== League table ====
| Pos | Team | Pld | W | D | L | GF | GA | GD | Pts | Qualification or relegation |
|---|---|---|---|---|---|---|---|---|---|---|
| 3 | Deportivo La Coruña | 38 | 22 | 6 | 10 | 67 | 47 | +20 | 72 | Qualification for the Champions League third qualifying round |
| 4 | Celta Vigo | 38 | 17 | 10 | 11 | 45 | 36 | +9 | 61 | Qualification for the Champions League third qualifying round |
| 5 | Valencia | 38 | 17 | 9 | 12 | 56 | 35 | +21 | 60 | Qualification for the UEFA Cup first round |
| 6 | Barcelona | 38 | 15 | 11 | 12 | 63 | 47 | +16 | 56 | Qualification for the UEFA Cup first round |
| 7 | Athletic Bilbao | 38 | 15 | 10 | 13 | 63 | 61 | +2 | 55 | |

Source: LFP
Rules for classification: 1st points; 2nd head-to-head points; 3rd head-to-head goal difference; 4th head-to-head away goals scored; 5th goal difference; 6th number of goals scored; 7th Fair-play points

==== Results by round ====
| Round | 1 | 2 | 3 | 4 | 5 | 6 | 7 | 8 | 9 | 10 | 11 | 12 | 13 | 14 | 15 | 16 | 17 | 18 | 19 | 20 | 21 | 22 | 23 | 24 | 25 | 26 | 27 | 28 | 29 | 30 | 31 | 32 | 33 | 34 | 35 | 36 | 37 | 38 |
|---|---|---|---|---|---|---|---|---|---|---|---|---|---|---|---|---|---|---|---|---|---|---|---|---|---|---|---|---|---|---|---|---|---|---|---|---|---|---|
| Ground | A | H | A | H | A | H | A | H | A | H | A | H | A | H | H | A | H | A | H | H | A | H | A | H | A | H | A | H | A | H | A | H | A | A | H | A | H | A |
| Result | W | W | D | W | L | D | W | W | D | L | W | D | W | W | L | L | D | W | W | W | D | W | W | D | L | L | D | L | W | L | W | L | L | W | L | D | L | W |
| Position | 3 | 1 | 2 | 1 | 5 | 4 | 2 | 2 | 2 | 3 | 3 | 3 | 2 | 2 | 3 | 4 | 3 | 3 | 3 | 3 | 3 | 3 | 3 | 3 | 4 | 4 | 4 | 4 | 4 | 5 | 4 | 4 | 5 | 4 | 5 | 5 | 5 | 5 |

Source: Competitive Matches
A = Away; H = Home; W = Win; D = Draw; L = Loss; = Leader, 2003–04 UEFA Champions League group stage; = 2003–04 UEFA Champions League group stage; = 2003–04 UEFA Champions League qualifying round; = 2003–04 UEFA Cup; = 2003–04 Segunda División

==== Matches ====
| 1 September 2002 1 | Mallorca | 0-2 | Valencia |
| | | | Gonzalo de los Santos 11'; Rubén Baraja 57' |

| 14 September 2002 2 | Valencia | 3-0 | Recreativo | Valencia |
| | Vicente 10'; John Carew 88'; John Carew 90' | | | Stadium: Mestalla |

| 22 September 2002 3 | Málaga | 2-2 | Valencia |
| | Manu 26'; Mikel Roteta 30' | | Mista 47'; Angulo 90' |

| 29 September 2002 4 | Valencia | 3-0 | Rayo Vallecano | Valencia |
| | Mista 34'; Rubén Baraja 45' (pen.); Angulo 86' | | | Stadium: Mestalla |

| 6 October 2002 5 | Valencia | 0-1 | Celta Vigo | Valencia |
| | | | Vágner 90' | Stadium: Mestalla |

| 19 October 2002 6 | Atlético Madrid | 1-1 | Valencia |
| | Javi Moreno 75' | Report | Mauricio Pellegrino 40' |

| 26 October 2002 7 | Valencia | 5-1 | Athletic Bilbao | Valencia |
| | Pablo Aimar 5'; John Carew 7'; Pablo Aimar 28'; Pablo Aimar 43'; Fábio Aurélio 48' (pen.) | Report | Tiko 81' | Stadium: Mestalla |

| 3 November 2002 8 | Espanyol | 0-1 | Valencia |
| | | Report | Fábio Aurélio 74' |

| 9 November 2002 9 | Valencia | 1-1 | Betis | Valencia |
| | Pablo Aimar 81' | Report | Marcos Assunção 70' | Stadium: Mestalla |

| 17 November 2002 10 | Osasuna | 1-0 | Valencia | Pamplona |
| | Iván Rosado 6' | Report |

| 24 November 2002 11 | Valencia | 2-0 | Valladolid | Valencia |
| | Mista 10'; Mista 30' | Report | | Stadium: Mestalla |

| 1 December 2002 12 | Alavés | 0-0 | Valencia |
| | | Report |

| 7 December 2002 13 | Valencia | 2-0 | Racing Santander | Valencia |
| | | Report | | Stadium: Mestalla |

| 14 December 2002 14 | Villarreal | 0-2 | Valencia |
| | | Report |

| 22 December 2002 15 | Valencia | 0-1 | Deportivo La Coruña | Valencia |
| | | | | Stadium: Mestalla |

| 5 January 2003 16 | Real Madrid | 4-1 | Valencia | Madrid |
| | | | | Stadium: Santiago Bernabéu |

| 11 January 2003 17 | Valencia | 2-2 | Real Sociedad | Valencia |
| | | | | Stadium: Mestalla |

| 18 January 2003 18 | Barcelona | 2-4 | Valencia | Barcelona |
| | | | | Stadium: Camp Nou |

| 26 January 2003 19 | Valencia | 1-0 | Sevilla | Valencia |
| | | Report | | Stadium: Mestalla |

| 2 February 2003 20 | Valencia | 1-0 | Mallorca | Valencia |
| | | Report | | Stadium: Mestalla |

| 9 February 2003 21 | Recreativo | 1-1 | Valencia | Huelva |

| 15 February 2003 22 | Valencia | 2-0 | Málaga | Valencia |
| | | Report | | Stadium: Mestalla |

| 23 February 2003 23 | Rayo Vallecano | 0-4 | Valencia | Vallecas |

| 2 March 2003 24 | Celta Vigo | 1-1 | Valencia | Vigo |
| | | Report | | Stadium: Balaídos |

| 8 March 2003 25 | Valencia | 0-1 | Atlético Madrid | Valencia |
| | | Report | | Stadium: Mestalla |

| 16 March 2003 26 | Athletic Bilbao | 1-0 | Valencia | Bilbao |
| | | Report | | Stadium: San Mames |

| 23 March 2003 27 | Valencia | 1-1 | Espanyol | Valencia |
| | | Report | | Stadium: Mestalla |

| 5 April 2003 28 | Real Betis | 2-0 | Valencia | Sevilla |
| | | | | Stadium: Benito Villamarin |

| 13 April 2003 29 | Valencia | 1-0 | Osasuna | Valencia |
| | | Report | | Stadium: Mestalla |

| 19 April 2003 30 | Real Valladolid | 1-0 | Valencia | Valladolid |
| | | Report | | Stadium: Jose Zorrilla |

| 27 April 2003 31 | Valencia | 3-0 | Alavés | Valencia |
| | | | | Stadium: Mestalla |

| 4 May 2003 32 | Racing Santander | 2-1 | Valencia | Santander |
| | | Report | | Stadium: El Sardinero |

| 11 May 2003 33 | Valencia | 1-2 | Villarreal | Valencia |
| | | Report | | Stadium: Mestalla |

| 17 May 2003 34 | Deportivo La Coruña | 1-2 | Valencia | La Coruña |
| | | Report | | Stadium: Riazor |

| 24 May 2003 35 | Valencia | 1-2 | Real Madrid | Valencia |
| | | Report | | Stadium: Mestalla |

| 1 June 2003 36 | Real Sociedad | 1-1 | Valencia | San Sebastián |
| | | Report | | Stadium: Anoeta |

| 15 June 2003 37 | Valencia | 1-3 | Barcelona | Valencia |
| | | Report | | Stadium: Mestalla |

| 21 June 2003 38 | Sevilla | 0-3 | Valencia | Sevilla |
| | | Report | | Stadium: Sanchez Pizjuan |

=== Copa del Rey ===
==== Round of 64 ====
| 11 September 2002 | Gimnàstic | 0-0 (4-5 p) | Valencia |

==== Round of 32 ====
| 6 November 2002 | Alicante | 3-3 (5-4 p) | Valencia | Alicante |
| | | Report |

=== UEFA Champions League ===
==== First group stage ====
===== Group B =====
| Pos | Team | Pld | W | D | L | GF | GA | GD | Pts | Qualification |
|---|---|---|---|---|---|---|---|---|---|---|
| 1 | (Spain) Valencia | 6 | 5 | 1 | 0 | 17 | 4 | +13 | 16 | Advance to second group stage |
| 2 | (Switzerland) Basel | 6 | 2 | 3 | 1 | 12 | 12 | 0 | 9 | Advance to second group stage |
| 3 | (England) Liverpool | 6 | 2 | 2 | 2 | 12 | 8 | +4 | 8 | Transfer to UEFA Cup |
| 4 | (Russia) Spartak Moscow | 6 | 0 | 0 | 6 | 1 | 18 | −17 | 0 | |

Source: RSSSF

| 17 September 2002 | Valencia (Spain) | 2–0 | (England) Liverpool | Valencia |
| 20:45 (20:45 UTC+2) | Aimar 20'; Baraja 38' | Report | | Stadium: Mestalla; Attendance: 35,333; Referee: (Germany) Herbert Fandel |

| 25 September 2002 | Spartak Moscow (Russia) | 0–3 | (Spain) Valencia | Moscow |
| 18:00 (20:00 UTC+4) | | Report | Angulo 6'; Mista 71'; Juan Sánchez 85' | Stadium: Dynamo Stadium; Attendance: 10,500; Referee: (France) Stéphane Bré |

| 2 October 2002 | Valencia (Spain) | 6–2 | (Switzerland) Basel | Valencia |
| 20:45 (20:45 UTC+2) | Carew 10', 13'; Aurélio 17'; Baraja 28'; Aimar 58'; Mista 60' | Report | Rossi 46'; H. Yakin 90' | Stadium: Mestalla; Attendance: 27,394; Referee: (Italy) Cosimo Bolognino |

| 22 October 2002 | Basel (Switzerland) | 2–2 | (Spain) Valencia | Basel |
| 20:45 (20:45 UTC+2) | Ergić 32', 90' | Report | Baraja 36'; Curro Torres 72' | Stadium: St. Jakob-Park; Attendance: 29,500; Referee: (Germany) Helmut Fleischer |

| 30 October 2002 | Liverpool (England) | 0–1 | (Spain) Valencia | Liverpool |
| 20:45 (19:45 UTC±0) | | Report | Rufete 34' | Stadium: Anfield; Attendance: 41,831; Referee: (Norway) Terje Hauge |

| 12 November 2002 | Valencia (Spain) | 3–0 | (Russia) Spartak Moscow | Valencia |
| 20:45 (20:45 UTC+1) | Juan Sánchez 38', 46'; Aurélio 78' | Report | | Stadium: Mestalla; Attendance: 27,000; Referee: (Greece) Georgios Kasnaferis |

==== Second group stage ====
===== Group B =====
| Pos | Team | Pld | W | D | L | GF | GA | GD | Pts | Qualification |
|---|---|---|---|---|---|---|---|---|---|---|
| 1 | (Spain) Valencia | 6 | 2 | 3 | 1 | 5 | 6 | −1 | 9 | Advance to knockout stage |
| 2 | (Netherlands) Ajax | 6 | 1 | 5 | 0 | 6 | 5 | +1 | 8 | Advance to knockout stage |
| 3 | (England) Arsenal | 6 | 1 | 4 | 1 | 6 | 5 | +1 | 7 | |
| 4 | (Italy) Roma | 6 | 1 | 2 | 3 | 7 | 8 | −1 | 5 | |

Source: RSSSF

| 27 November 2002 | Valencia (Spain) | 1–1 | (Netherlands) Ajax | Valencia |
| 20:45 (20:45 UTC+1) | Angulo 90' | Report | Ibrahimović 89' | Stadium: Mestalla; Attendance: 32,164; Referee: Gilles Veissière (France) |

| 10 December 2002 | Arsenal (England) | 0–0 | (Spain) Valencia | London |
| 20:45 (19:45 UTC±0) | | Report | | Stadium: Highbury; Attendance: 34,793; Referee: (Denmark) Kim Milton Nielsen |

| 18 February 2003 | Roma (Italy) | 0–1 | (Spain) Valencia | Rome |
| 20:45 (20:45 UTC+1) | | Report | Carew 78' | Stadium: Stadio Olimpico; Attendance: 30,599; Referee: (Germany) Wolfgang Stark |

| 26 February 2003 | Valencia (Spain) | 0–3 | (Italy) Roma | Valencia |
| 20:45 (20:45 UTC+1) | | Report | Totti 24', 30'; Emerson 36' | Stadium: Mestalla; Attendance: 35,175; Referee: (Belgium) Frank De Bleeckere |

| 11 March 2003 | Ajax (Netherlands) | 1–1 | (Spain) Valencia | Amsterdam Arena, Amsterdam |
| 20:45 (20:45 UTC+1) | Pasanen 56' | Report | Kily González 28' (pen.) | Attendance: 48,633; Referee: Ľuboš Micheľ (Slovakia) |

| 19 March 2003 | Valencia (Spain) | 2–1 | (England) Arsenal | Valencia |
| 20:45 (20:45 UTC+1) | Carew 34', 57' | Report | Henry 49' | Stadium: Mestalla; Attendance: 44,151; Referee: (Greece) Kyros Vassaras |

==== Quarter-finals ====
| 9 April 2003 | Inter Milan (Italy) | 1–0 | (Spain) Valencia | Milan |
| 20:45 (20:45 UTC+2) | Vieri 14' | Report | | Stadium: San Siro; Attendance: 52,623; Referee: (Germany) Markus Merk |

| 22 April 2003 | Valencia (Spain) | 2–1 | (Italy) Inter Milan | Valencia |
| 20:45 (20:45 UTC+2) | Aimar 7'; Baraja 51' | Report | Vieri 5' | Stadium: Mestalla; Attendance: 43,802; Referee: (Denmark) Kim Milton Nielsen |

== Statistics ==
=== Players statistics ===
| No. | Pos | Nat | Player | Total | | La Liga | | Copa del Rey | | Champions League | |
| No. | Pos | Nat | Player | Apps | Goals | Apps | Goals | Apps | Goals | Apps | Goals |
|---|---|---|---|---|---|---|---|---|---|---|---|
| 1 | GK | (Spain) ESP | Cañizares | 43 | -39 | 31 | -27 | 0 | 0 | 12 | -12 |
| 15 | DF | (Italy) ITA | Carboni | 41 | 0 | 24+5 | 0 | 0+1 | 0 | 10+1 | 0 |
| 4 | DF | (Argentina) ARG | Ayala | 43 | 1 | 31 | 1 | 0 | 0 | 12 | 0 |
| 2 | DF | (Argentina) ARG | Pellegrino | 41 | 1 | 26+2 | 1 | 1+1 | 0 | 11 | 0 |
| 3 | DF | (Brazil) BRA | Fábio Aurélio | 37 | 10 | 23+4 | 8 | 2 | 0 | 4+4 | 2 |
| 8 | DM | (Spain) ESP | Baraja | 48 | 9 | 30+5 | 5 | 1 | 0 | 12 | 4 |
| 6 | DM | (Spain) ESP | Albelda | 37 | 0 | 23+3 | 0 | 0 | 0 | 11 | 0 |
| 19 | MF | (Spain) ESP | Rufete | 40 | 4 | 26+2 | 3 | 1 | 0 | 8+3 | 1 |
| 21 | AM | (Argentina) ARG | Aimar | 44 | 11 | 29+2 | 8 | 1+1 | 0 | 10+1 | 3 |
| 14 | MF | (Spain) ESP | Vicente | 39 | 1 | 26+2 | 1 | 0 | 0 | 10+1 | 0 |
| 7 | FW | (Norway) NOR | Carew | 46 | 13 | 25+7 | 8 | 1 | 0 | 12+1 | 5 |
| 13 | GK | (Spain) ESP | Palop | 14 | -11 | 7+2 | -8 | 2 | -3 | 2+1 | 0 |
| 12 | DF | (Spain) ESP | Marchena | 37 | 0 | 22+4 | 0 | 1+1 | 0 | 4+5 | 0 |
| 10 | FW | (Spain) ESP | Angulo | 37 | 6 | 15+9 | 4 | 1+1 | 0 | 6+5 | 2 |
| 20 | FW | (Spain) ESP | Mista | 39 | 11 | 10+17 | 7 | 1 | 2 | 3+8 | 2 |
| 11 | FW | (Spain) ESP | Juan Sánchez | 36 | 9 | 9+17 | 5 | 1 | 1 | 5+4 | 3 |
| 17 | DF | (France) FRA | Réveillère | 24 | 1 | 17+1 | 1 | 0 | 0 | 6 | 0 |
| 22 | MF | (Uruguay) URU | de los Santos | 23 | 1 | 11+6 | 1 | 2 | 0 | 2+2 | 0 |
| 23 | DF | (Spain) ESP | Curro Torres | 22 | 1 | 14 | 0 | 1 | 0 | 7 | 1 |
| 5 | DF | (Serbia and Montenegro) SCG | Djukic | 10 | 0 | 6+2 | 0 | 1 | 0 | 1 | 0 |
| 18 | MF | (Argentina) ARG | Kily González | 20 | 1 | 4+9 | 0 | 1 | 0 | 4+2 | 1 |
| 34 | MF | (Spain) ESP | Garrido | 9 | 0 | 5+1 | 0 | 1 | 0 | 1+1 | 0 |
| 27 | DF | (Spain) ESP | Navarro | 6 | 0 | 2+1 | 0 | 2 | 0 | 0+1 | 0 |
| 30 | FW | (Spain) ESP | Borja | 4 | 0 | 1+2 | 0 | 1 | 0 | | |
| 9 | FW | (Spain) ESP | Salva | 4 | 0 | 1+1 | 0 | 0+1 | 0 | 1 | 0 |
| 29 | MF | (Spain) ESP | Enguix | 2 | 0 | 0+2 | 0 | | | | |
| 39 | MF | (Spain) ESP | Gavilán | 2 | 0 | 0+2 | 0 | | | | |
| 36 | DF | (France) FRA | Dorothée | 1 | 0 | 0+1 | 0 | | | | |
| 31 | DF | (Spain) ESP | Albiol | 2 | 0 | 0+1 | 0 | 0 | 0 | 0+1 | 0 |
| 37 | MF | (Spain) ESP | Redondo | 1 | 0 | 0+1 | 0 | | | | |
| 40 | DF | (Spain) ESP | Soriano | 1 | 0 | 0+1 | 0 | | | | |
| 16 | MF | (Romania) ROU | Șerban | | | | | | | | |
| 28 | GK | (Spain) ESP | Rángel | | | | | | | | |
| 24 | DF | (Paraguay) PAR | Ángel Amarilla | | | | | | | | |

- Source: https://www.bdfutbol.com/en/t/t2002-0336.html
