= 2006–07 Valencia CF season =

Valencia CF
2006-07 season
- Manager: Quique Sánchez Flores
- Stadium: Mestalla Stadium
- La Liga: 4th
- Champions League: Quarter-finals
- Copa del Rey: Round of 16
- Top goalscorer: League: David Villa (16); All: David Villa (20)
Home colours	Away colours	Third colours

During the 2006–07 Spanish football season, Valencia CF competed in La Liga, the Copa del Rey and the UEFA Champions League.

== Overview ==
Valencia made significant changes for the season, with coach Quique Sánchez Flores and technical director Amedeo Carboni overhauling the squad. Players who did not fit in the current playing system, such as Marco Di Vaio, Bernardo Corradi, Pablo Aimar, Rufete, and Mista, were some of those who were sold, while Fábio Aurélio signed for Liverpool (reuniting with former Valencia manager Rafael Benítez) after refusing an extension to his contract. To strengthen the squad, Valencia signed Joaquin, Asier del Horno, Fernando Morientes and Francesco Tavano, as well as recalling David Silva and Jaime Gavilán from loan spells, and promoting several youngsters from the Valencia B squad. The club's transfer activity was not wholly successful, however: the club failed in an attempt to sign Benfica winger Simão, while veteran defender Roberto Ayala expressed his desire to sign for rivals Villarreal.

Valencia started the season strongly, winning their first three Champions League matches, against Olympiacos, Roma and Shakhtar Donetsk. The team qualified to pass on to the next round in a 2–2 draw against Shaktar on Matchday Four. On 15 December, Valencia were drawn to play against Italian champions Inter Milan in the last 16 of the Champions League, with the first leg scheduled to take place on 21 February. In La Liga, Valencia started the season with victories against Real Betis, Atlético Madrid, Getafe and Gimnàstic de Tarragona, along with a creditable draw with reigning Liga champions Barcelona. As of 1 October, Valencia were second, behind Barcelona on goal difference. However, they went through a slump in November which caused them to slip up in the league. The first of six winless matches started with a 1–0 defeat to Racing de Santander. This poor run was attributed to injuries to key players like captain David Albelda, midfielder Rubén Baraja, wingers Jaime Gavilán and Vicente, defenders Carlos Marchena and Asier del Horno and forward Francesco Tavano. Despite all these worries, the team is made a strong comeback, winning their last three matches before the winter break (against Deportivo de La Coruña, Real Zaragoza and Mallorca).

== Squad ==
Squad at end of season

Note: Flags indicate national team as defined under FIFA eligibility rules; some limited exceptions apply. Players may hold more than one non-FIFA nationality.

No.	Pos.	Nation	Player
1	GK	ESP	Santiago Cañizares
2	DF	POR	Miguel
3	DF	ESP	Asier del Horno
4	DF	ARG	Roberto Ayala
5	DF	ESP	Carlos Marchena
6	MF	ESP	David Albelda (captain)
7	FW	ESP	David Villa
8	MF	ESP	Rubén Baraja
9	FW	ESP	Fernando Morientes
10	FW	ESP	Miguel Ángel Angulo
11	MF	URU	Mario Regueiro
13	GK	ESP	Juan Luis Mora
14	MF	ESP	Vicente
15	MF	ESP	Joaquín
16	MF	POR	Hugo Viana
17	DF	ESP	David Navarro
18	MF	ESP	Jorge López
19	MF	ESP	Jaime Gavilán
20	DF	ESP	Raúl Albiol

No.	Pos.	Nation	Player
21	MF	ESP	David Silva
22	MF	BRA	Edu
23	DF	ESP	Curro Torres
24	DF	ITA	Emiliano Moretti
25	GK	FRA	Ludovic Butelle
26	DF	ESP	Cerra
27	MF	ESP	Pablo Hernández
28	MF	ESP	Natxo Insa
29	DF	ESP	David Córcoles
30	MF	ESP	Aarón
31	MF	ESP	Miguel Pallardó
32	DF	ESP	Cristian Castells
33	DF	ESP	Berna
34	FW	ESP	Javi Guerra
35	GK	ESP	Vicente Guaita
36	MF	ESP	Ángel Montoro
37	DF	ESP	Álex Vaquero
38	MF	ESP	Vicente Romero
39	MF	ESP	Carles

=== Left club during season ===
Note: Flags indicate national team as defined under FIFA eligibility rules; some limited exceptions apply. Players may hold more than one non-FIFA nationality.

No. / Pos. / Nation / Player; 12 / MF / ITA / Stefano Fiore (on loan to Torino)	No. / Pos. / Nation / Player; 12 / FW / ITA / Francesco Tavano (on loan to Roma)

== Transfers ==
=== In ===
- (Spain) Fernando Morientes – (England) Liverpool
- (Spain) David Silva – (Spain) Celta Vigo, loan return
- (Spain) Jaime Gavilán – (Spain) Getafe, loan return
- (Italy) Stefano Fiore – (Italy) Fiorentina, loan return
- (Spain) Javier Garrido Ramírez – (Spain) Albacete, loan return
- (Spain) Asier del Horno – (England) Chelsea
- (Italy) Francesco Tavano – (Italy) Empoli
- (Spain) Joaquín – (Spain) Real Betis

=== Out ===
- (Italy) Marco Di Vaio – (France) Monaco
- (Italy) Amedeo Carboni – retired
- (Brazil) Fábio Aurélio – (England) Liverpool
- (Spain) José Enrique – (Spain) Villarreal
- (Uruguay) Fabián Estoyanoff – (Spain) Deportivo, loan
- (Portugal) Marco Caneira – (Portugal) Sporting CP, loan
- (Italy) Bernardo Corradi – (England) Manchester City
- (Spain) Francisco Rufete – (Spain) Espanyol
- (Spain) Mista – (Spain) Atlético Madrid
- (Argentina) Pablo Aimar – (Spain) Real Zaragoza
- (Spain) Javier Garrido – (Spain) Lorca Deportiva
- (Netherlands) Patrick Kluivert – (Netherlands) PSV
- (Italy) Stefano Fiore – (Italy) Torino

== Results ==
=== La Liga ===
Pos	Team	Pld	W	D	L	GF	GA	GD	Pts	Qualification or relegation
2	Barcelona	38	22	10	6	78	33	+45	76 (Note: RMA 2–0 BAR; BAR 3–3 RMA)	Qualification for the Champions League group stage
3	Sevilla	38	21	8	9	64	35	+29	71	Qualification for the Champions League third qualifying round
4	Valencia	38	20	6	12	57	42	+15	66	Qualification for the Champions League third qualifying round
5	Villarreal	38	18	8	12	48	44	+4	62	Qualification for the UEFA Cup first round
6	Zaragoza	38	16	12	10	55	43	+12	60 (Note: ATM 0–1 ZAR; ZAR 1–0 ATM)	Qualification for the UEFA Cup first round

Source: LFP
Rules for classification: 1st points; 2nd head-to-head points; 3rd head-to-head goal difference; 4th head-to-head goals scored; 5th goal difference; 6th number of goals scored; 7th Fair-play points
