= 2008–09 Valencia CF season =

Valencia
2008–09 season
- Chairman: Vicente Soriano
- Manager: Unai Emery
- La Liga: 6th
- Copa del Rey: Quarter-finals
- UEFA Cup: Round of 32
- Top goalscorer: League: David Villa (28); All: David Villa (31)
Home colours	Away colours	Third colours

During the 2008–09 season, Spanish football club Valencia CF placed 6th in La Liga. The team also reached the quarter-final round of the Copa del Rey.

== Squad ==
Note: Flags indicate national team as defined under FIFA eligibility rules; some limited exceptions apply. Players may hold more than one non-FIFA nationality.

No.	Pos.	Nation	Player
1	GK	ESP	César Sánchez
2	DF	ESP	Curro Torres
3	MF	NED	Hedwiges Maduro
4	DF	ESP	Raúl Albiol (vice-captain)
5	DF	ESP	Carlos Marchena (captain)
6	MF	ESP	David Albelda
7	FW	ESP	David Villa
8	MF	ESP	Rubén Baraja
9	FW	ESP	Fernando Morientes
10	FW	ESP	Miguel Ángel Angulo
11	DF	ESP	Asier del Horno
13	GK	BRA	Renan Brito
14	MF	ESP	Vicente
15	DF	BRA	Carleto

No.	Pos.	Nation	Player
16	FW	ESP	Juan Mata
17	MF	ESP	Joaquín
18	MF	POR	Manuel Fernandes
19	MF	ESP	Pablo Hernández
20	DF	ESP	Alexis
21	MF	ESP	David Silva
22	MF	BRA	Edu
23	DF	POR	Miguel
24	DF	ITA	Emiliano Moretti
25	MF	POR	Hugo Viana
30	FW	ESP	Míchel
33	GK	ESP	Vicente Guaita
36	DF	ESP	Jaume Costa

== Transfers ==
=== In ===
#	Pos	Player	From	Fee	Date
19	MF	(Spain) Pablo Hernández	Getafe	€1,000,000	05-06-2008
	GK	(France) Ludovic Butelle	Real Valladolid	Loan return	01-07-2008
11	DF	(Spain) Asier del Horno	Athletic Bilbao	Loan return	01-07-2008
18	MF	(Portugal) Manuel Fernandes	Everton	Loan return	01-07-2008
	DF	(Spain) David Navarro	Mallorca	Loan return	01-07-2008
	MF	(Uruguay) Mario Regueiro	Real Murcia	Loan return	01-07-2008
2	DF	(Spain) Curro Torres	Real Murcia	Loan return	01-07-2008
25	MF	(Portugal) Hugo Viana	Osasuna	Loan return	01-07-2008
13	GK	(Brazil) Renan Brito	Internacional	€4,000,000	27-08-2008
	MF	(Uruguay) Ignacio María González	Danubio	Undisclosed	01-09-2008
15	DF	(Brazil) Carleto	Santos	€2,000,000	26-11-2008
1	GK	(Spain) César Sánchez	Tottenham Hotspur	Free	20-01-2009

=== Out ===
#	Pos	Player	To	Fee	Date
1	GK	(Spain) Santiago Cañizares	Unattatched	Released	19 May 2008
	DF	(Portugal) Marco Caneira	Sporting CP	€1,500,000	25 June 2008
	GK	(Spain) Juan Mora	Levante	Free	1 July 2008
	MF	(Spain) Jordi Alba (from Valencia B)	Gimnàstic Tarragona	Undisclosed	24 July 2008
	MF	(Spain) Sisi	Recreativo Huelva	Undisclosed	1 August 2008
	FW	(Spain) Javier Arizmendi	Real Zaragoza	€3,500,000	12 August 2008
1	GK	(Germany) Timo Hildebrand	1899 Hoffenheim	Free	10 December 2008

=== Loaned out ===
#	Pos	Player	To	Start	End
	MF	(Spain) Ángel Montoro (from Valencia B)	Real Murcia	17 June 2008	
	DF	(Spain) Lillo (from Valencia B)	Real Murcia	17 June 2008	
	MF	(Spain) Sunny	Osasuna	27-06-2008	1 July 2009
	DF	(Spain) David Navarro	Mallorca	20 July 2008	01-07-2009
	FW	(Venezuela) Miku (from Valencia B)	Salamanca	26 August 2008	
	DF	(Spain) Carlos Bellvís (from Valencia)	Numancia	28 August 2008	
	MF	(Argentina) Éver Banega	Atlético Madrid	28-08-2008	1 July 2009
	GK	(France) Ludovic Butelle	Lille	01-09-2008	1 July 2009
	MF	(Uruguay) Nacho González	Newcastle United	1 September 2008	1 July 2009
	MF	(Spain) Aarón	Rangers	13 August 2008	01-07-2010
12	FW	(Serbia) Nikola Žigić	Racing Santander	26 December 2008	

== Statistics ==
=== Appearances and goals ===
Last updated on 24 Jan 2009.

No.	Pos	Nat	Player	Total		La Liga		UEFA Cup		Copa del Rey	
No.	Pos	Nat	Player	Apps	Goals	Apps	Goals	Apps	Goals	Apps	Goals
1	GK	(Spain) ESP	César Sánchez	20	0	18+0	0	2+0	0	0+0	0
2	DF	(Spain) ESP	Curro Torres	3	0	0+1	0	2+0	0	0+0	0
3	MF	(Netherlands) NED	Hedwiges Maduro	32	1	18+4	1	5+1	0	3+1	0
4	DF	(Spain) ESP	Raúl Albiol	42	2	33+1	2	5+1	0	1+1	0
5	DF	(Spain) ESP	Carlos Marchena	36	1	24+2	1	7+0	0	3+0	0
6	MF	(Spain) ESP	David Albelda	37	0	26+4	0	4+1	0	2+0	0
7	FW	(Spain) ESP	David Villa	42	31	33+0	29	1+4	1	2+2	1
8	MF	(Spain) ESP	Rubén Baraja	34	5	22+6	3	1+3	1	2+0	1
9	FW	(Spain) ESP	Fernando Morientes	31	6	7+13	1	7+0	3	3+1	2
10	FW	(Spain) ESP	Miguel Ángel Angulo	15	1	5+6	0	2+0	0	2+0	1
11	DF	(Spain) ESP	Asier del Horno	20	2	6+3	0	8+0	2	3+0	0
12	FW	(Serbia) SRB	Nikola Žigić	3	2	0+0	0	0+0	0	2+1	2
13	GK	(Brazil) BRA	Renan Brito	24	0	19+0	0	3+0	0	2+0	0
14	MF	(Spain) ESP	Vicente	36	9	6+21	6	3+2	0	4+0	3
15	DF	(Spain) ESP	Iván Helguera	1	0	0+0	0	0+0	0	1+0	0
15	DF	(Brazil) BRA	Carleto	1	0	0+1	0	0+0	0	0+0	0
16	FW	(Spain) ESP	Juan Mata	44	12	35+2	10	3+3	1	0+1	1
17	MF	(Spain) ESP	Joaquín	37	6	26+5	4	1+3	1	1+1	1
18	MF	(Portugal) POR	Manuel Fernandes	37	2	20+7	2	5+3	0	1+1	0
19	MF	(Spain) ESP	Pablo Hernández	30	5	13+8	3	6+0	1	3+0	1
20	DF	(Spain) ESP	Alexis	26	1	24+0	1	2+0	0	0+0	0
21	MF	(Spain) ESP	David Silva	24	5	17+2	4	2+1	1	1+1	0
22	MF	(Brazil) BRA	Edu	27	1	9+12	1	3+0	0	2+1	0
23	DF	(Portugal) POR	Miguel	33	0	26+1	0	3+1	0	2+0	0
24	DF	(Italy) ITA	Emiliano Moretti	29	0	25+3	0	0+0	0	1+0	0
25	MF	(Portugal) POR	Hugo Viana	5	0	0+0	0	4+0	0	1+0	0
26	DF	(Spain) ESP	David Lombán (from B team)	0	0	0+0	0	0+0	0	0+0	0
27	MF	(Spain) ESP	Carles Martínez (from B team)	0	0	0+0	0	0+0	0	0+0	0
28	FW	(Spain) ESP	Daniel Olcina (from B team)	0	0	0+0	0	0+0	0	0+0	0
29	DF	(Spain) ESP	Arturo (from B team)	0	0	0+0	0	0+0	0	0+0	0
30	FW	(Spain) ESP	Míchel (from B team)	15	1	4+9	0	0+0	0	1+1	1
31	MF	(Spain) ESP	Ximo Navarro (from B team)	1	0	0+0	0	0+0	0	1+0	0
32	MF	(Spain) ESP	Tímor (from B team)	0	0	0+0	0	0+0	0	0+0	0
33	GK	(Spain) ESP	Vicente Guaita (from B team)	4	0	1+1	0	0+0	0	2+0	0
34	GK	(Spain) ESP	Sergio Garabato (from B team)	0	0	0+0	0	0+0	0	0+0	0
35	GK	(Spain) ESP	Salva (from B team)	0	0	0+0	0	0+0	0	0+0	0
36	DF	(Spain) ESP	Jaume (from B team)	0	0	0+0	0	0+0	0	0+0	0
37	DF	(Spain) ESP	Alexis Villar (from B team)	0	0	0+0	0	0+0	0	0+0	0
38	DF	(Spain) ESP	Castells (from B team)	0	0	0+0	0	0+0	0	0+0	0
39	FW	(Spain) ESP	Morgado (from B team)	0	0	0+0	0	0+0	0	0+0	0
40	MF	(Spain) ESP	Ximo (from B team)	0	0	0+0	0	0+0	0	0+0	0

=== Goal scorers ===
Position	Nation	Number	Name	La Liga	UEFA Cup	Copa del Rey	Total
1	(Spain)	7	David Villa	29	1	1	31
2	(Spain)	16	Juan Mata	10	1	1	12
3	(Spain)	14	Vicente	6	0	3	9
4	(Spain)	9	Joaquín	4	1	1	6
=	(Spain)	9	Fernando Morientes	1	3	2	6
6	(Spain)	21	David Silva	4	1	0	5
=	(Spain)	8	Rubén Baraja	3	1	1	5
=	(Spain)	19	Pablo Hernández	3	1	1	5
9	(Spain)	4	Raúl Albiol	2	0	0	2
=	(Portugal)	18	Manuel Fernandes	2	0	0	2
=	(Spain)	11	Asier del Horno	0	2	0	2
=	(Serbia)	12	Nikola Žigić	0	0	2	2
13	(Netherlands)	3	Hedwiges Maduro	1	0	0	1
=	(Spain)	5	Carlos Marchena	1	0	0	1
=	(Spain)	20	Alexis	1	0	0	1
=	(Brazil)	15	Edu	1	0	0	1
=	(Spain)	10	Miguel Ángel Angulo	0	0	1	1
=	(Spain)	30	Míchel	0	0	1	1
/	/	/	TOTALS	38	11	14	63

== Competitions ==
=== Overall ===
Competition	Started round	Final position / round	First match	Last match
La Liga	—	6th	30 August 2008	31 May 2009
UEFA Cup	First round	Round of 32	18 September 2008	26 February 2009
Copa del Rey	Round of 32	Quarter-finals	29 October 2008	28 January 2009

Updated to match played 24 Jan
Source: Competitions

=== La Liga ===
==== League table ====
Pos	Team	Pld	W	D	L	GF	GA	GD	Pts	Qualification or relegation
4	Atlético Madrid	38	20	7	11	80	57	+23	67	Qualification for the Champions League play-off round
5	Villarreal	38	18	11	9	61	54	+7	65	Qualification for the Europa League play-off round
6	Valencia	38	18	8	12	68	54	+14	62	Qualification for the Europa League play-off round
7	Deportivo La Coruña	38	16	10	12	48	47	+1	58	
8	Málaga	38	15	10	13	55	59	−4	55	

Source: LFP and Yahoo! Sport
Rules for classification: 1) points; 2) head-to-head points; 3) head-to-head goal difference; 4) head-to-head goals scored; 5) goal difference; 6) number of goals scored.

==== Results by round ====
Round	1	2	3	4	5	6	7	8	9	10	11	12	13	14	15	16	17	18	19	20	21	22	23	24	25	26	27	28	29	30	31	32	33	34	35	36	37	38
Ground	H	A	H	A	H	A	H	A	H	A	H	A	H	A	H	A	H	A	H	A	H	A	H	A	H	A	H	A	H	A	H	A	H	A	H	A	H	A
Result	W	D	W	W	W	W	W	D	L	W	L	D	W	L	W	L	W	D	L	L	W	L	D	D	L	L	D	W	W	W	W	W	D	L	W	L	L	W
Position	2	2	1	1	1	1	1	1	4	3	3	4	3	3	2	4	2	4	4	4	4	4	4	5	6	8	8	6	5	4	4	4	4	4	4	5	6	6

Leader
2009–10 UEFA Champions League Group stage
2009–10 UEFA Champions League Play-off round
2009–10 UEFA Europa League Play-off round
2009–10 UEFA Europa League Third qualifying round
Relegation to 2009–10 Segunda División

Source: kicker.de (in German) and juventus.com

==== Matches ====
30 August 2008	(Spain) Valencia	3–0	Mallorca (Spain)	Mestalla, Valencia
21:00	Silva (yellow card) 13'; Moretti (yellow card) 20'; Villa 34'; Mata 38'; Albelda (yellow card) 52'; Alexis (yellow card) 80'; Vicente 82'			Attendance: 45,000; Referee: Antonio Rubinos Pérez (Spain)

14 September 2008	(Spain) Almería	2–2	Valencia (Spain)	Estadio de los Juegos Mediterráneos, Almería
20:00	Piatti 20'; Corona (yellow card) 37'; Negredo 40'; Juanito (yellow card) 89'		(yellow card) 13' Helguera; 35', (yellow card) 61' Alexis; 69' Villa	Attendance: 10,000; Referee: Carlos Velasco Carballo (Spain)

21 September 2008	(Spain) Valencia	1–0	Osasuna (Spain)	Mestalla, Valencia
16:00	Edu (yellow card) 65'; Mata 84'		(yellow card) 54', (yellow card) 64' (red card) Azpilicueta; (yellow card) 66' Ricardo	Attendance: 37,000; Referee: David Fernández Borbalán (Spain)

25 September 2008	(Spain) Málaga	0–2	Valencia (Spain)	Estadio La Rosaleda, Málaga
19:00	Weligton (yellow card) 79'; Salva (red card) 88'		(yellow card) 18' Fernandes; (yellow card) 31' Del Horno; (yellow card) 45' Alexis; 71', 90' Villa; (yellow card) 90' Edu	Attendance: 15,960; Referee: Alfonso Alvarez Izquierdo (Spain)

28 September 2008	(Spain) Valencia	4–2	Deportivo La Coruña (Spain)	Mestalla, Valencia
18:00	Mata 35'; Villa 49', 82'; Joaquín 69'; Albelda (yellow card) 85'; Moretti (yellow card) 86'		11' (o.g.) Renan; (yellow card) 25' Filipe Luís; (yellow card) 72' Laure; 85' Lafita	Attendance: 40,000; Referee: Miguel Angel Pérez Lasa (Spain)

5 October 2008	(Spain) Real Valladolid	0–1	Valencia (Spain)	Estadio José Zorrilla, Valladolid
18:00	Pedro León (yellow card) 27'		(yellow card) 36' Miguel; (yellow card) 52' Villa; (yellow card) 53' Albelda; 54' Fernandes; (yellow card) 85' Renan	Attendance: 17,456; Referee: César Muñiz Fernández (Spain)

18 October 2008	(Spain) Valencia	4–0	Numancia (Spain)	Mestalla, Valencia
16:00	Villa 4', 89'; Mata 72'; Vicente 83'			Attendance: 7,000; Referee: Carlos Megía Dávila (Spain)

26 October 2008	(Spain) Recreativo de Huelva	1–1	Valencia (Spain)	Estadio Nuevo Colombino, Huelva
16:00	Arzo (yellow card) 45'; Camuñas 47'; Poli (yellow card) 76'; Martin (yellow card) 78'; Vázquez (yellow card) 90'		(yellow card) 45', (goal) 62' Villa; (yellow card) 85' Alexis	Attendance: 13,000; Referee: Eduardo Iturralde González (Spain)

1 November 2008	(Spain) Valencia	2–4	Racing de Santander (Spain)	Mestalla, Valencia
21:00	Villa 28' (pen.); Moretti (yellow card) 36'; Albelda (yellow card) 58'; Joaquín 70'		23', 49', 80' Tchité; (yellow card) 26' Pinillos; (yellow card) 28' Colsa; (yellow card) 60' Lacen; 84' (o.g.) Albelda	Attendance: 33,000; Referee: Javier Turienzo Álvarez (Spain)

9 November 2008	(Spain) Getafe	0–3	Valencia (Spain)	Coliseum Alfonso Pérez, Getafe
20:00	Licht (yellow card) 14'; Manu (yellow card) 39'; Polanski (yellow card) 44'; Soldado (red card) 45'; Díaz (yellow card) 51'; Contra (yellow card) 67'		29', (yellow card) 34' Fernandes; (yellow card) 38' Mata; (yellow card) 61' Moretti; (yellow card) 66' Marchena; 69' Joaquín; 81' Vicente	Attendance: 11,000; Referee: Alberto Undiano Mallenco (Spain)

15 November 2008	(Spain) Valencia	2–3	Sporting de Gijón (Spain)	Mestalla, Valencia
21:00	Albelda (yellow card) 58'; Villa 69' (pen.); Baraja (yellow card) 76'; Mata 90'		20' Morán; (yellow card) 39' Neru; 52', (yellow card) 55' Barral; 81' Castro; (yellow card) 84' Bilić	Attendance: 50,000; Referee: Jose Luis Paradas Romero (Spain)

22 November 2008	(Spain) Sevilla	0–0	Valencia (Spain)	Ramón Sánchez Pizjuán, Seville
19:30	Navas (yellow card) 5'; Luís Fabiano (yellow card) 59'		(yellow card) 55' Marchena; (yellow card) 65' Fernandes; (yellow card) 78' Baraja	Attendance: 43,000; Referee: Fernando Teixeira Vitienes (Spain)

30 November 2008	(Spain) Valencia	3–2	Real Betis (Spain)	Mestalla, Valencia
18:00	Villa 10' (pen.), (yellow card) 79'; Mata 20'; Marchena (red card) 64'; Baraja (yellow card) 69', (goal) 73'; Renan (yellow card) 90'		(yellow card) 28' Damià; 56' Juanma; 64' (pen.) Emana; (yellow card) 73' Nélson; (yellow card) 75' Juanito	Attendance: 35,000; Referee: Carlos Velasco Carballo (Spain)

6 December 2008	(Spain) Barcelona	4–0	Valencia (Spain)	Camp Nou, Barcelona
21:00	Henry 20', 28', 79'; Alves 46'		(yellow card) 6' Albiol; (yellow card) 38' Albelda; (yellow card) 67' Villa; (yellow card) 72' Miguel; (yellow card) 73' Del Horno	Attendance: 94,000; Referee: David Fernández Borbalán (Spain)

13 December 2008	(Spain) Valencia	2–1	Espanyol (Spain)	Valencia
19:00	Fernandes (yellow card) 33'; Albiol 58'; Moretti (yellow card) 67'; Vicente 81'; Albelda (yellow card) 90'; Miguel (yellow card) 90'		(yellow card) 10' Rufete; (yellow card) 21', (goal) 28' Román; (yellow card) 64' Lacruz; (yellow card) 79' Kameni; (yellow card) 80' Hurtado; (yellow card) 90' Béranger	Stadium: Mestalla; Attendance: 32,000; Referee: Eduardo Iturralde González (Spain)

20 December 2008	(Spain) Real Madrid	1–0	Valencia (Spain)	Santiago Bernabéu, Madrid
19:00	Higuaín 3'; Salgado (yellow card) 27'; Marcelo (yellow card) 31'; Robben (yellow card) 83'; Palanca (yellow card) 88'		(yellow card) 21' Del Horno; (yellow card) 29', (yellow card) 66' (red card) Marchena; (yellow card) 69' Albiol	Attendance: 75,000; Referee: Rafael Ramírez Domínguez (Spain)

3 January 2009	(Spain) Valencia	3–1	Atlético Madrid (Spain)	Mestalla, Valencia
21:00	Villa 34' (pen.); Silva 39', 69'; Baraja (yellow card) 45'; Albelda (yellow card) 72'		(yellow card) 33' García; 45' (pen.) Forlán; (yellow card) 75' Perea; (yellow card) 77' Heitinga; (yellow card) 87' Assunção	Attendance: 35,000; Referee: Julián Rodríguez Santiago (Spain)

10 January 2009	(Spain) Valencia	3–3	Villarreal (Spain)	Mestalla, Valencia
21:00	Baraja 1', (yellow card) 53'; Villa 10'; Edu 79'		(yellow card) 21' Eguren; 45' Fuentes; (yellow card) 49' Bruno; (yellow card) 60' Fuentes; 76' Llorente; 84' (pen.) Rossi	Attendance: 45,000; Referee: Luis Medina Cantalejo (Spain)

18 January 2009	(Spain) Athletic Bilbao	3–2	Valencia (Spain)	Estadio San Mamés, Bilbao
18:00	Gabilondo 18', (yellow card) 21'; Martínez 42', (yellow card) 69'; Ocio (yellow card) 80'; Koikili (yellow card) 85'; Llorente 90' (pen.)		2' Villa; 30', (yellow card) 36' Morientes; (yellow card) 33' Mata; (yellow card) 80', (yellow card) 90' (red card) Fernandes	Attendance: 39,000; Referee: Carlos Megía Dávila (Spain)

25 January 2009	(Spain) Mallorca	–	Valencia (Spain)	ONO Estadi, Palma
16:00				Referee: (Spain)

1 February 2009	(Spain) Valencia	–	Almería (Spain)	Mestalla, Valencia
16:00				Referee: (Spain)

8 January 2009	(Spain) Osasuna	–	Valencia (Spain)	Estadio Reyno de Navarra, Pamplona
16:00				Referee: (Spain)

15 January 2009	(Spain) Valencia	–	Málaga (Spain)	Mestalla, Valencia
16:00				Referee: (Spain)

22 January 2009	(Spain) Deportivo La Coruña	–	Valencia (Spain)	Estadio Riazor, A Coruña
16:00				Referee: (Spain)

1 March 2009	(Spain) Valencia	–	Real Valladolid (Spain)	Mestalla, Valencia
16:00				Referee: (Spain)

8 March 2009	(Spain) Numancia	–	Valencia (Spain)	Nuevo Estadio Los Pajaritos, Soria
16:00				Referee: (Spain)

15 March 2009	(Spain) Valencia	–	Recreativo de Huelva (Spain)	Mestalla, Valencia
16:00				Referee: (Spain)

22 March 2009	(Spain) Racing de Santander	–	Valencia (Spain)	Estadio El Sardinero, Santander
16:00				Referee: (Spain)

5 April 2009	(Spain) Valencia	–	Getafe (Spain)	Mestalla, Valencia
16:00				Referee: (Spain)

12 April 2009	(Spain) Sporting de Gijón	–	Valencia (Spain)	Estadio El Molinon, Gijón
16:00				Referee: (Spain)

19 April 2009	(Spain) Valencia	–	Sevilla (Spain)	Mestalla, Valencia
16:00				Referee: (Spain)

22 April 2009	(Spain) Real Betis	–	Valencia (Spain)	Estadio Manuel Ruiz de Lopera, Seville
16:00				Referee: (Spain)

26 April 2009	(Spain) Valencia	–	Barcelona (Spain)	Mestalla, Valencia
16:00				Referee: (Spain)

3 May 2009	(Spain) Espanyol	–	Valencia (Spain)	Estadi Olímpic Lluís Companys, Barcelona
16:00				Referee: (Spain)

10 May 2009	(Spain) Valencia	–	Real Madrid (Spain)	Mestalla, Valencia
16:00				Referee: (Spain)

17 May 2009	(Spain) Atlético Madrid	–	Valencia (Spain)	Estadio Vicente Calderón, Madrid
16:00				Referee: (Spain)

24 May 2009	(Spain) Villarreal	–	Valencia (Spain)	Estadio El Madrigal, Villarreal
16:00				Referee: (Spain)

31 May 2009	(Spain) Valencia	–	Athletic Bilbao (Spain)	Mestalla, Valencia
16:00				Referee: (Spain)

=== UEFA Cup ===
==== Overall ====
===== Results summary =====
Overall								Home						Away					
Pld	W	D	L	GF	GA	GD	Pts	W	D	L	GF	GA	GD	W	D	L	GF	GA	GD
6	3	3	0	11	5	+6	12	1	2	0	4	3	+1	2	1	0	7	2	+5

===== Results by round =====
Round	1	2	3	4	5	6	7	8	9	10	11	12	13	14	15	16	17	18	19	20	21	22	23	24	25	26	27	28	29	30
Ground	A	H	-	-	-	H	A	H	A	-	-	-	A	H	-	-	-	H	A	-	-	-			-	-	-		-	-
Result	W	W				D	W	D	D																					
Position	1	1				2	2	2	2																					

Updated to match(es) played on 24 Jan. Source: UEFA Cup 2008-09
A = Away; H = Home; W = Win; D = Draw; L = Loss

==== First round ====
===== First leg =====
18 September 2008	(Portugal) Marítimo	0–1	Valencia (Spain)	Estádio dos Barreiros, Funchal
21:00	Olberdam (yellow card) 30'		12' Morientes; (yellow card) 34' Edu; (yellow card) 54' Renan; (yellow card) 56' Helguera; (yellow card) 71' Albelda; (yellow card) 75' Hernández; (yellow card) 80' Villa	Attendance: 3,000; Referee: Claudio Circhetta (Switzerland)

===== Second leg =====
2 October 2008	(Spain) Valencia	2–1 (3–1 agg.)	Marítimo (Portugal)	Mestalla, Valencia
21:00	Helguera (yellow card) 38'; Albelda (yellow card) 73'; Del Horno 78', (yellow card) 83'; Villa 90' (pen.), (yellow card) 90'		(yellow card) 25' Bruno; 41' Marcinho; (yellow card) 89' Fogaça	Attendance: 28,000; Referee: Ivan Bebek (Croatia)

==== Group stage ====
Pos	Team	Pld	W	D	L	GF	GA	GD	Pts	Qualification	STE	VAL	FCK	BRU	ROS
1	(France) Saint-Étienne	4	2	2	0	9	4	+5	8	Advance to knockout stage	—	2–2	—	—	3–0
2	(Spain) Valencia	4	1	3	0	8	4	+4	6	Advance to knockout stage	—	—	1–1	1–1	—
3	(Denmark) Copenhagen	4	1	2	1	4	5	−1	5	Advance to knockout stage	1–3	—	—	—	1–1
4	(Belgium) Club Brugge	4	0	3	1	2	3	−1	3		1–1	—	0–1	—	—
5	(Norway) Rosenborg	4	0	2	2	1	8	−7	2		—	0–4	—	0–0	—

Source: RSSSF

===== Results summary =====
Overall								Home						Away					
Pld	W	D	L	GF	GA	GD	Pts	W	D	L	GF	GA	GD	W	D	L	GF	GA	GD
4	1	3	0	8	4	+4	6	0	2	0	2	2	0	1	1	0	6	2	+4

===== Matches =====
6 November 2008	(Spain) Valencia	1–1	Copenhagen (Denmark)	Mestalla, Valencia
20:30	Morientes 61'		85' Santín; (yellow card) 90' Pospěch	Attendance: 20,000; Referee: Knut Kircher (Germany)

27 November 2008	(Norway) Rosenborg	0–4	Valencia (Spain)	Lerkendal Stadion, Trondheim
19:45			21' Mata; 76' Hernández; 88' Baraja; 90' Joaquín	Attendance: 14,549; Referee: Kevin Blom (Netherlands)

4 December 2008	(Spain) Valencia	1–1	Club Brugge (Belgium)	Mestalla, Valencia
19:45	Žigić 60'; Del Horno (yellow card) 74'		18' Alcaraz; (yellow card) 49' Dirar	Attendance: 18,000; Referee: Martin Atkinson (England)

17 December 2008	(France) Saint-Étienne	2–2	Valencia (Spain)	Stade Geoffroy-Guichard, Saint-Étienne
19:45	Ilan 29', 44'; Sall (yellow card) 80'		33', (yellow card) 58' Morientes; 72' Žigić; (yellow card) 71' Viana; (yellow card) 81' Marchena	Attendance: 28,000; Referee: Alexandru Deaconu (Romania)

==== Round of 32 ====
===== First leg =====
18 February 2009	Dynamo Kyiv (Ukraine)	1–1	(Spain) Valencia	Lobanovsky Dynamo Stadium, Kyiv
18:00	Milevskyi 63'	Report	Silva 8'	Attendance: 16,800; Referee: Serge Gumienny (Belgium)

===== Second leg =====
26 February 2009	Valencia (Spain)	2–2 (3–3 (a) agg.)	(Ukraine) Dynamo Kyiv	Mestalla, Valencia
21:30	Marchena 45'; Del Horno 54'	Report	Kravets 34', 73'	Attendance: 30,000; Referee: Damir Skomina (Slovenia)

=== Copa del Rey ===
==== Overall ====
===== Results summary =====
Overall								Home						Away					
Pld	W	D	L	GF	GA	GD	Pts	W	D	L	GF	GA	GD	W	D	L	GF	GA	GD
6	4	1	1	15	7	+8	13	3	0	0	9	3	+6	1	1	1	6	4	+2

===== Results by round =====
Round	1	2	3	4	5	6	7	8	9	10	11	12	13	14	15	16	17	18
Ground	A	H	-	-	A	H	-	-	H	A	-	-	H	A	-	-	H	-
Result	W	W			D	W			W	L								
Position	1	1			1	1			1	2								

Updated to match(es) played on 30 Jan. Source: 2008–09 Copa del Rey Cup
A = Away; H = Home; W = Win; D = Draw; L = Loss

==== Round of 32 ====
===== First leg =====
29 October 2008	(Spain) Club Portugalete	1–4	Valencia (Spain)	Estadio La Florida, Basque Country
19:30	Vera 47'		11', 50' Morientes; 21' Vicente; 84' Žigić

===== Second leg =====
12 November 2008	(Spain) Valencia	3–0 (7–1 agg.)	Club Portugalete (Spain)	Mestalla, Valencia
20:00	Angulo 20'; Míchel 63'; Hernández 72'

==== Round of 16 ====
===== First leg =====
7 January 2009	(Spain) Racing de Santander	1–1	Valencia (Spain)	Estadio El Sardinero, Santander
20:00	Sepsi (yellow card) 40'; Munitis (yellow card) 45'; Lacen 54'; Oriol (yellow card) 89'		(yellow card) 30' Marchena; 36' (o.g.) Colsa; (yellow card) 55' Maduro; (yellow card) 70', (yellow card) 90' (red card) Miguel; (red card) 87' Vicente; (yellow card) 90' Del Horno	Attendance: 12,600

===== Second leg =====
14 January 2009	(Spain) Valencia	3–1 (a.e.t.) (4–2 agg.)	Racing de Santander (Spain)	Mestalla, Valencia
19:00	Vicente 18' (pen.), 102'; Del Horno (yellow card) 33'; Maduro (yellow card) 45'; Marchena (yellow card) 83'; Joaquín 117'		22' Colsa; (yellow card) 83' Lacen; (yellow card) 109' Oriol; (yellow card) 115' Munitis	Attendance: 30,000; Referee: Paradas Romero (Spain)

==== Quarter-final ====
===== First leg =====
21 January 2009	(Spain) Valencia	3–2	Sevilla (Spain)	Mestalla, Valencia
20:00	Villa 6'; Baraja 83'; Mata 86'; Silva (yellow card) 89'		(yellow card) 16' Escudé; 53' Fabiano; 68' Adriano	Attendance: 23,000; Referee: Alberto Undiano Mallenco (Spain)

===== Second leg =====
28 January 2009	(Spain) Sevilla	2–1 (4–4 (a) agg.)	Valencia (Spain)	Estadio Ramón Sánchez Pizjuán, Seville
19:00				Referee: (Spain)
