= David Rangel =

David Rangel may refer to:

- David Rangel (footballer, born 1969), Mexican footballer
- David Rangel (footballer, born 1979), Spanish footballer
