= Vicente Romero (footballer) =

Spanish footballer

Personal information
- Full name: Vicente Romero Romero
- Date of birth: 8 February 1987 (age 39)
- Place of birth: Valencia, Spain
- Height: 1.77 m (5 ft 10 in)
- Position: Midfielder

Youth career
- Valencia

Senior career*
Years	Team	Apps	(Gls)
2006–2008	Valencia B	27	(1)
2008	Ontinyent	0	(0)
2008–2009	Alzira	20	(1)
2009–2011	Burjassot	62	(6)
2011–2012	Catarroja	40	(9)
2012–2013	Ontinyent	2	(1)
2013–2015	Cullera	36	(1)
Total		187	(19)
- * Club domestic league appearances and goals

Vicente Romero Romero (born 8 February 1987) is a Spanish former footballer who played as a right midfielder.

== Career ==
Romero was born in Valencia. A product of local Valencia CF's youth academy, he only appeared once for the club's first team, when he played 15 minutes in a 1–0 away loss against AS Roma in the group stage of UEFA Champions League on 5 December 2006 after coming on as a substitute for Jorge López.

The vast majority of Romero's senior career was spent in the Valencian Community, in the Segunda División B or lower.
