= Burjassot CF =

Association football club in Spain

Burjassot
- Full name: Burjassot Club de Fútbol
- Founded: 1913; 113 years ago
- Ground: Los Silos, Burjassot, Valencia, Spain
- Capacity: 2,000
- President: Reinaldo Romero
- Head coach: Lucas Sánchez del Pino
- League: Segona FFCV – Group 3
- 2024–25: Segona FFCV – Group 3, 6th of 16
Home colours	Away colours

Burjassot Club de Futbol is a Spanish football team based in Burjassot, in the autonomous community of Valencia. Founded in 1913 as Club Verano Burjassot, it plays in Segona FFCV – Group 3 and holds its home games at Estadio Los Silos, with a capacity of 2,000 seats.

== History ==
In 1916, the club was registered in the Valencian Football Federation.

== Season to season ==
Season	Tier	Division	Place	Copa del Rey
1929–30	3	3ª	5th	
1930–31	5	2ª Reg.	1st	
1931–32	5	2ª Reg.		
1932–33	5	2ª Reg.		
1933–34	4	1ª Reg.	4th	
1934–35	5	2ª Reg.		
1935–36	5	2ª Reg.		
1939–40	2	2ª	6th	
1940–41	4	1ª Reg.	6th	
1941–42	4	1ª Reg.	8th	
1942–43	DNP			
1943–44	5	2ª Reg.	1st	
1944–45	5	2ª Reg.	2nd	
1945–46	4	1ª Reg.	4th	
1946–47	4	1ª Reg.	4th	
1947–48	4	1ª Reg.	10th	
1948–49	4	1ª Reg.	9th	
1949–50	4	1ª Reg.	4th	
1950–51	4	1ª Reg.	10th	
1951–52	4	1ª Reg.	11th	

Season	Tier	Division	Place	Copa del Rey
1952–53	4	1ª Reg.	13th	
1953–54	4	1ª Reg.	15th	
1954–55	4	1ª Reg.	3rd	
1955–56	4	1ª Reg.	3rd	
1956–57	3	3ª	15th	
1957–58	3	3ª	14th	
1958–59	3	3ª	18th	
1959–60	4	1ª Reg.	9th	
1960–61	4	1ª Reg.	5th	
1961–62	4	1ª Reg.	17th	
1962–63	4	1ª Reg.	6th	
1963–64	4	1ª Reg.	13th	
1964–65	4	1ª Reg.	11th	
1965–66	4	1ª Reg.	4th	
1966–67	4	1ª Reg.	4th	
1967–68	4	1ª Reg.	11th	
1968–69	5	2ª Reg.	1st	
1969–70	4	1ª Reg.	3rd	
1970–71	4	Reg. Pref.	18th	
1971–72	5	1ª Reg.	10th	

Season	Tier	Division	Place	Copa del Rey
1972–73	5	1ª Reg.	2nd	
1973–74	4	Reg. Pref.	4th	
1974–75	4	Reg. Pref.	19th	
1975–76	5	1ª Reg.	8th	
1976–77	5	1ª Reg.	4th	
1977–78	5	Reg. Pref.	11th	
1978–79	6	1ª Reg.	9th	
1979–80	6	1ª Reg.	9th	
1980–81	6	1ª Reg.	9th	
1981–82	6	1ª Reg.	7th	
1982–83	6	1ª Reg.	3rd	
1983–84	6	1ª Reg.	2nd	
1984–85	5	Reg. Pref.	10th	
1985–86	5	Reg. Pref.	14th	
1986–87	5	Reg. Pref.	9th	
1987–88	5	Reg. Pref.	11th	
1988–89	5	Reg. Pref.	10th	
1989–90	5	Reg. Pref.	13th	
1990–91	5	Reg. Pref.	12th	
1991–92	5	Reg. Pref.	11th	

Season	Tier	Division	Place	Copa del Rey
1992–93	5	Reg. Pref.	13th	
1993–94	5	Reg. Pref.	3rd	
1994–95	5	Reg. Pref.	1st	
1995–96	4	3ª	11th	
1996–97	4	3ª	9th	
1997–98	4	3ª	5th	
1998–99	4	3ª	7th	
1999–2000	4	3ª	8th	
2000–01	4	3ª	6th	
2001–02	4	3ª	2nd	
2002–03	4	3ª	12th	
2003–04	4	3ª	17th	
2004–05	4	3ª	11th	
2005–06	4	3ª	5th	
2006–07	4	3ª	6th	
2007–08	4	3ª	11th	
2008–09	4	3ª	7th	
2009–10	4	3ª	12th	
2010–11	4	3ª	18th	
2011–12	5	Reg. Pref.	13th	

Season	Tier	Division	Place	Copa del Rey
2012–13	5	Reg. Pref.	2nd	
2013–14	5	Reg. Pref.	8th	
2014–15	5	Reg. Pref.	16th	
2015–16	6	1ª Reg.	1st	
2016–17	5	Reg. Pref.	9th	
2017–18	5	Reg. Pref.	5th	
2018–19	5	Reg. Pref.	7th	
2019–20	5	Reg. Pref.	17th	
2020–21	5	Reg. Pref.	14th	
2021–22	7	1ª Reg.	11th	
2022–23	7	1ª Reg.	13th	
2023–24	8	2ª FFCV	3rd	
2024–25	8	2ª FFCV	6th	
2025–26	8	2ª FFCV	3rd	
2026–27	8	2ª FFCV		

- 1 season in Segunda División
- 20 seasons in Tercera División

== Notable former players ==
- (Equatorial Guinea) Sergio Hinestrosa
- (Paraguay) Ángel Amarilla
- (Spain) Fernando Marzal
- (Spain) Míchel
- (Spain) David Rangel
- (Spain) Vicente Romero
- (Spain) Vicente Asensi
- (Spain) Roger Martí
