= Renan (footballer, born January 1985) =

Brazilian footballer

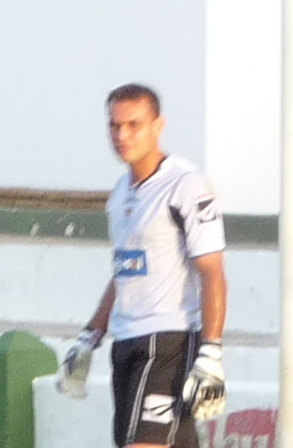
- Renan playing for Xerez in 2009

Personal information
- Full name: Renan Brito Soares
- Date of birth: 24 January 1985 (age 41)
- Place of birth: Viamão, Brazil
- Height: 1.85 m (6 ft 1 in)
- Position: Goalkeeper

Team information
- Current team: Atlético Goianiense (assistant)

Youth career
- 2004–2005: Internacional

Senior career*
Years	Team	Apps	(Gls)
2005–2008	Internacional	56	(0)
2008–2011	Valencia	19	(0)
2009–2010	→ Xerez (loan)	35	(0)
2010–2011	→ Internacional (loan)	32	(0)
2011–2012	Internacional	3	(0)
2013–2017	Goiás	176	(0)
2018	Ceará	2	(0)
2019	São Bento	4	(0)
2020	Esportivo	12	(0)
2020	Pelotas	14	(0)
2020–2021	Paraná	15	(0)
2021–2022	Marcílio Dias	13	(0)
Total		381	(0)

International career
2008	Brazil U23	8	(0)

Managerial career
- 2022–2023: Barra-SC U17
- 2023–2024: Barra-SC (assistant)
- 2024–2025: Barra-SC
- 2025: Internacional U20
- 2026: Aparecidense
- 2026–: Atlético Goianiense (assistant)
- 2026: Atlético Goianiense (interim)
Medal record
Representing Brazil
Men's Football
Bronze medal – third place	2008 Beijing	Team competition
- * Club domestic league appearances and goals

Renan Brito Soares (born 24 January 1985), simply known as Renan, is a Brazilian football coach and former player who played as a goalkeeper. He is the current assistant coach of Atlético Goianiense.

== Career ==
Born in Viamão, Rio Grande do Sul, Renan made his professional debut for Internacional against Juventude in the Campeonato Gaúcho in a 1–0 win on 3 April 2005.

=== Valencia ===
Renan joined Spanish club Valencia on 13 August 2008. He made his debut for Valencia CF in a 3–0 win against Real Mallorca. He made a great start to his Valencia CF career and was their number one keeper, but on 20 January 2009 he sustained a groin injury in a match against Athletic de Bilbao and was ruled out for six weeks, enabling veteran César Sánchez to step in. After recovering from his injury he remained on the bench till the end of the 2008–09 season owing to Cesar's fine form, and following the close season signing of Miguel Ángel Moyà from Real Mallorca he left the Mestalla.

=== Xerez ===
Xerez signed the Brazilian goalkeeper on loan from Valencia on 27 July 2009.

=== Internacional ===
On 4 June 2010, Sport Club Internacional signed him on loan from Valencia.

On 13 December 2018, Renan joined Campeonato Brasileiro Série B side São Bento on a one-year contract.

== International career ==
Renan was a member of Brazil's team for the 2008 Summer Olympics, he was the first-choice goalkeeper for the tournament, appearing in all matches as Brazil went on to get the bronze medal.

== Honours ==
=== Player ===
Internacional

- Campeonato Gaúcho: 2005, 2008, 2011, 2012
- Copa Libertadores: 2006, 2010
- FIFA Club World Cup: 2006
- Recopa Sudamericana: 2007, 2011

Goiás

- Campeonato Goiano: 2013, 2015, 2016, 2017

Ceará

- Campeonato Cearense: 2018

Brazil

- 2008 Summer Olympics: Bronze medal winner
