= Jean-Félix Dorothée =

French footballer (born 1981)

Personal information
- Date of birth: 2 October 1981 (age 45)
- Place of birth: Le Blanc-Mesnil, France
- Height: 1.79 m (5 ft 10 in)
- Position: Right back

Team information
- Current team: UJA Alfortville

Youth career
- 1995–1998: INF Clairefontaine

Senior career*
Years	Team	Apps	(Gls)
1999–2002	Rennes	2	(0)
2002–2004	Valencia	1	(0)
2005–2007	Mouscron		
2009–	UJA Alfortville		

International career
- France U-20
- * Club domestic league appearances and goals

Jean-Félix Dorothée (born 2 October 1981) is a French footballer. Currently, he plays in the Championnat de France amateur for UJA Alfortville.

== Club career ==
He joined Mouscron in January 2005 on free transfer, having signed a 3.5-year contract.

== International career ==
=== France youth ===
He was in the French squad of 2001 FIFA World Youth Championship.

=== Guadeloupe ===
In early 2008, he was asked to represent Guadeloupe, as he is part Guadeloupean. He agreed to play for his adopted nation, but never made his debut as he missed his chance through injury. He was promised a place in Guadeloupe's squad to face numerous other countries. Dorothée gave a press conference saying that he believed that Guadeloupe had what it took to qualify for the 2010 World Cup.
