= Javier Garrido (footballer) =

Spanish footballer (born 1979)

Javier Garrido Ramirez (born 1 July 1979) is a Spanish former professional footballer who played as a defender or winger.

== Early life ==
Garrido is a native of Valencia, Spain, and joined the youth academy of Spanish side Valencia as a youth player.

== Club career ==
Garrido started his senior career with La Liga side Valencia, and initially mainly played when defender Curro Torres was unable to play or was rested. During the 2002–03 season, despite being described as playing at a "good level" for Valencia, the winter signing of French defender Anthony Réveillère caused him to be sent on loan. He helped Valencia win the 2003–04 UEFA Cup, the 2003–04 Copa del Rey, and two league titles. In 2002, he was sent on loan to Spanish second tier side Córdoba. However, he suffered an ankle injury while playing for the club.

In 2004, he was sent on loan to Ligue 1 side Saint-Etienne. However, while playing for the club, he failed to adapt and was known for his poor performances and marking ability. That winter, without the club's permission, he played for a Spanish regional representative team and broke a ligament. In 2006, he almost signed for Spanish side Lorca, but the transfer never happened.

At the age of 27-seven, he retired from professional football due to a knee injury. In total, he made 22 appearances in the La Liga and ten appearances in the Ligue 1.

== International career ==
Garrido played for the Valencian Community autonomous football team.

== Style of play ==
Garrido mainly operated as a full-back or winger.

== Post-playing career ==
After retiring from professional football, Garrido worked as a football agent.
