= Borja Criado =

Spanish retired footballer

Personal information
- Full name: Borja Eduardo Criado Malagarriga
- Date of birth: 16 April 1982 (age 44)
- Place of birth: Barcelona, Spain
- Height: 1.75 m (5 ft 9 in)
- Position: Forward

Youth career
- Europa

Senior career*
Years	Team	Apps	(Gls)
2000–2001	Europa		
2001–2004	Valencia B	95	(12)
2002–2003	Valencia	3	(0)
2004–2006	Espanyol B	21	(1)
2006–2007	Ciudad Murcia	15	(0)
2007–2008	Granada 74	13	(1)
Total		147	(14)
- * Club domestic league appearances and goals

Borja Eduardo Criado Malagarriga (born 16 April 1982) is a Spanish former professional footballer who played as a forward.

== Club career ==
Criado was born in Barcelona, Catalonia. After signing in 2001 with Valencia CF from CE Europa in his native city, he spent the vast majority of his three-year spell with the former's reserves, appearing three times in La Liga for the first team precisely in the season where they failed to win the national championship during his stay; Rafael Benítez was in charge on his league debut on 1 December 2002, a 0–0 away draw against Deportivo Alavés (three minutes played).

In 2004, Criado joined another reserve team and also in the Segunda División B, RCD Espanyol B, suffering relegation in his first season. Subsequently, he moved to Segunda División with Ciudad de Murcia, appearing rarely (15 matches out of 42, no goals) in a near promotion to the top flight.

Criado was one of the players that remained with the club after it was relocated to Granada and renamed Granada 74 CF. In early January 2008, although initially acquitted by the Royal Spanish Football Federation's Competition Committee and Appeal Committee, he received a two-year ban for having tested positive for Finasteride in the previous year, whilst a Ciudad Murcia player. Since 2001, the player had been fighting against baldness with a product which contained the substance, interrupted the treatment for two years upon improving on his condition, then resumed it in 2005, the year when Finasteride was banned by the World Anti-Doping Agency due to the fact it could be used to mask other drugs, as steroids.

Upon appeal, Criado's sentence was reduced to nine months then three, but he eventually chose to retire after losing all motivation, aged just 26. Subsequently, he worked as a notary.
