= César Soriano =

Spanish footballer

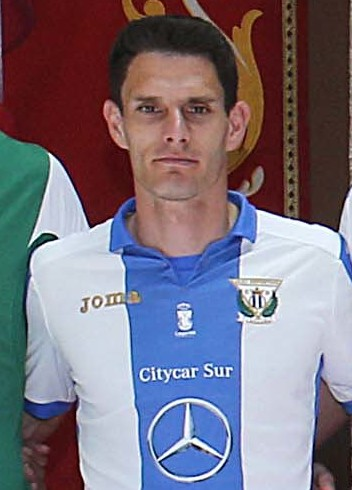
- Soriano with Leganés in 2016

Personal information
- Full name: César Soriano Ferrero
- Date of birth: 22 April 1983 (age 43)
- Place of birth: Ontinyent, Spain
- Height: 1.80 m (5 ft 11 in)
- Position: Left-back

Youth career
- Valencia

Senior career*
Years	Team	Apps	(Gls)
2002–2004	Valencia B	45	(0)
2003	Valencia	1	(0)
2004–2005	Castellón	5	(0)
2005–2006	Leganés	24	(0)
2006–2011	Ontinyent	92	(1)
2011–2012	Badalona	33	(0)
2012–2013	Guadalajara	39	(1)
2014	Avilés	10	(1)
2014–2016	Leganés	54	(0)
2016–2017	Huesca	25	(0)
2017–2018	Alcorcón	17	(0)
2018–2021	Lleida Esportiu	57	(0)
Total		402	(3)
- * Club domestic league appearances and goals

César Soriano Ferrero (born 22 April 1983) is a Spanish former professional footballer who played as a left-back.

== Club career ==
Born in Ontinyent, Valencian Community, Soriano finished his youth career at Valencia CF, and made his senior debut with their reserves in the Segunda División B. On 21 June 2003 he played his only La Liga game with the first team, coming on as a second-half substitute in a 3–0 away win against Sevilla FC.

Released by the Che in summer 2004, Soriano went on to spend seven of the following eight seasons in the third division, with CD Castellón, CD Leganés, Ontinyent CF and CF Badalona. On 4 July 2012, he joined Segunda División side CD Guadalajara.

Soriano appeared in his first competitive match for his new club on 19 August 2012, featuring the full 90 minutes of a 1–1 draw at AD Alcorcón. He scored his only goal as a professional the following 7 April, contributing to a 3–1 home victory over Córdoba CF.

On 2 March 2014, Soriano signed for Real Avilés CF until the end of the third-tier season. After impressing, he moved to Leganés one league above on 2 July.

Soriano agreed to a new one-year contract at the Estadio Municipal de Butarque in June 2015. He contributed 22 appearances during the campaign, as the team from the Madrid outskirts achieved promotion to the top flight for the first time ever.

On 7 July 2016, 33-year-old Soriano signed a one-year deal with SD Huesca as a free agent. A year later, he moved to fellow second-division club AD Alcorcón on a contract of the same duration.

On 23 July 2018, Soriano joined Lleida Esportiu in division three for two years.
