= Ángel Amarilla =

Paraguayan footballer (born 1981)

Personal information
- Full name: Ángel Roberto Amarilla Lezcano
- Date of birth: 27 July 1981 (age 45)
- Place of birth: Eusebio Ayala, Paraguay
- Height: 1.83 m (6 ft 0 in)
- Position: Centre back

Youth career
- Capitán Figari

Senior career*
Years	Team	Apps	(Gls)
1997–1998	Olimpia	4	(0)
1998–1999	Atlético Rafaela	27	(1)
1999–2000	Valencia B	16	(0)
2000–2005	Valencia	0	(0)
2001	→ Getafe (loan)	5	(0)
2001–2002	→ Badajoz (loan)	16	(1)
2003–2004	→ Racing Club (loan)	11	(2)
2004	→ Cerro Porteño (loan)	15	(3)
2005–2006	Valencia B		
2006–2007	Burjassot		
2007–2009	Alzira	49	(4)
2009–2010	Sant Andreu	30	(0)
2010–2011	Alzira	30	(0)
2011–2015	Huracán	134	(18)
2015–2016	Paterna	?	(3)
- * Club domestic league appearances and goals as of 25 October 2015

Ángel Roberto Amarilla Lezcano (born 27 July 1981) is a Paraguayan former professional footballer who played as a central defender.

== Football career ==
Born in Eusebio Ayala, Amarilla was signed by Valencia CF in the summer of 1999, being hailed as of one of the biggest promises in his country after playing as a 17-year-old for Atlético de Rafaela, which led his agent Eduardo Gamarnik trying to find a club for him in Europe. He was initially assigned to the B-team.

On 21 November 2000 Amarilla made his first – and only – official appearance for the main squad, with coach Héctor Cúper fielding him in a 2–0 home win against SK Sturm Graz for the season's UEFA Champions League second group stage. Released by the Che in June 2006 after several loans, he resumed his career in the Spanish lower leagues, mainly with UD Alzira and mostly in the Valencian Community.

== Honours ==
Cerro Porteño

- Paraguayan Primera División: 2004

Alzira

- Tercera División: 2007–08

Sant Andreu

- Segunda División B: 2009–10
