= Jorge López (footballer, born 1978) =

Spanish footballer

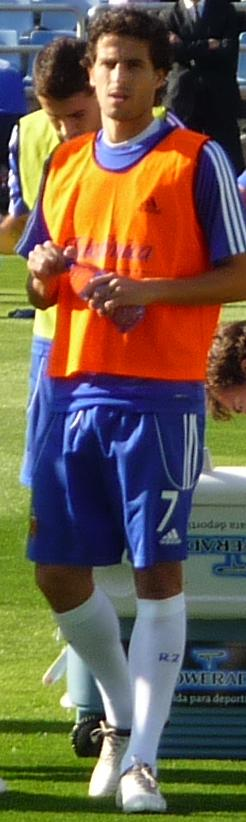
- López training with Zaragoza in 2009

Personal information
- Full name: Jorge López Montaña
- Date of birth: 19 September 1978 (age 48)
- Place of birth: Logroño, Spain
- Height: 1.82 m (5 ft 11 1/2 in)
- Position: Midfielder

Youth career
- Logroñés

Senior career*
Years	Team	Apps	(Gls)
1996–1997	Logroñés B	15	(4)
1997–1999	Logroñés	14	(2)
1998	→ Las Rozas (loan)		
1999–2003	Villarreal	134	(30)
2003–2007	Valencia	45	(4)
2004–2005	→ Mallorca (loan)	29	(1)
2007–2008	Racing Santander	36	(6)
2008–2011	Zaragoza	94	(9)
2011–2012	OFI	24	(1)
2013	Gent	15	(2)
2014	Cádiz	11	(1)
Total		417	(60)
- * Club domestic league appearances and goals

Jorge López Montaña (Spanish pronunciation: [ˈxoɾxe ˈlopeθ]; born 19 September 1978) is a Spanish former professional footballer who played as a right midfielder.

Over 11 seasons, he amassed La Liga totals of 271 matches and 36 goals, representing Villarreal, Valencia, Mallorca, Racing de Santander and Zaragoza in the competition and winning major titles with the second club, including the 2004 national championship.

== Club career ==
López was born in Logroño, La Rioja. A product of hometown CD Logroñés' youth system, he signed for Villarreal CF in summer 1999, with whom he achieved La Liga promotion at the end of the season. Making his top-flight debut on 10 September 2000 in a 1–5 home loss against Rayo Vallecano, he finished the campaign missing only three league matches and scoring eight goals, with the Valencians finishing seventh.

Joining neighbours Valencia CF for 2003–04 in a €4 million deal, López played 26 matches and netted four times as they were proclaimed national champions. After a loan to fellow top-division side RCD Mallorca, he would only total 19 league appearances the next two seasons, mainly due to injuries.

López was released by Valencia in 2007, and was signed by Racing de Santander on a free transfer, where he was a key element in their first-ever qualification for the UEFA Cup after a sixth-place finish. On 25 November 2007, he scored the game's only goal in a home victory over his previous club.

Having already played one game in the 2008–09 season with Racing, a 1–1 home draw to Sevilla FC, López was sold to Segunda División's Real Zaragoza on 1 September 2008, for €3 million. He scored seven goals in 38 matches as his new team immediately returned to the top tier, surpassing the 3,000-minute mark, but featured significantly less the following campaign although he began it in the starting XI.

López left Zaragoza in July 2011, after failing to negotiate a new contract. He had his first experience abroad at the age of 33, joining OFI Crete F.C. in Greece.

In January 2013 López, who had become a free player due to financial problems in his previous club, moved to Belgium and joined several compatriots (including manager Víctor Fernández) at K.A.A. Gent. Following a brief spell in his country's Segunda División B with Cádiz CF, he retired at the age of 36.

== Personal life ==
López's younger brother, Iñigo, was also a footballer.

== Honours ==
Villarreal

- UEFA Intertoto Cup: 2003

Valencia

- La Liga: 2003–04
