= David Rangel (footballer, born 1979) =

Spanish footballer

Personal information
- Full name: David Rangel Pastor
- Date of birth: 25 July 1979 (age 47)
- Place of birth: Valencia, Spain
- Height: 1.78 m (5 ft 10 in)
- Position: Goalkeeper

Youth career
- Valencia

Senior career*
Years	Team	Apps	(Gls)
1998–2003	Valencia B	71	(0)
1999–2001	→ Burjassot (loan)		
2003–2004	Valencia	1	(0)
2004–2006	Lleida	46	(0)
2006–2007	Hércules	0	(0)
2007–2008	Alzira	20	(0)
2008–2010	Ontinyent	81	(0)
2010–2011	Castellón	36	(0)
2011–2012	Alavés	36	(0)
2012–2013	Ontinyent	32	(0)
2013–2014	Alcoyano	27	(0)
2014–2015	Olímpic Xàtiva	31	(0)
Total		381	(0)
- * Club domestic league appearances and goals

David Rangel Pastor (born 25 July 1979) is a Spanish former professional footballer who played as a goalkeeper.

== Club career ==
Born in Valencia, Rangel graduated from his local club Valencia's youth system, going on to spend several years with their reserves and also being loaned to neighbouring side Burjassot. In the 2003–04 season, he backed up Santiago Cañizares and Andrés Palop in the main squad, making his only La Liga appearance on 14 May 2004 – as the Che were already champions – in a 2–1 away loss against Villarreal.

Rangel signed for Lleida of Segunda División in summer 2004, with the Catalonia team being relegated in his second season, where he played 27 of the 42 league matches. Subsequently, he resumed his career in the Segunda División B, playing mainly in his native region.

== Honours ==
Valencia

- La Liga: 2003–04
- UEFA Cup: 2003–04
