= David Navarro (footballer) =

Spanish retired footballer (born 1980)

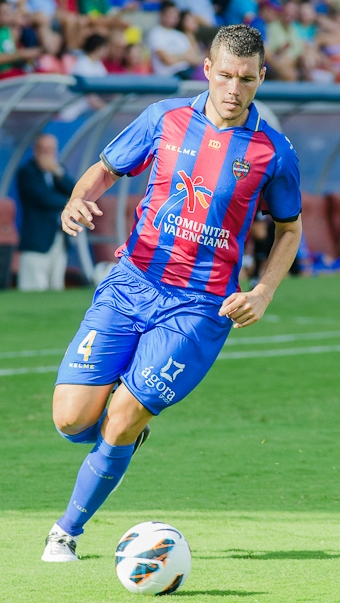
- Navarro in action for Levante in 2012

Personal information
- Full name: David Navarro Pedrós
- Date of birth: 25 May 1980 (age 46)
- Place of birth: Sagunto, Spain
- Height: 1.88 m (6 ft 2 in)
- Position: Centre-back

Youth career
- Acero
- 1997–1999: Valencia

Senior career*
Years	Team	Apps	(Gls)
1999–2003	Valencia B	56	(3)
2002–2011	Valencia	97	(7)
2007–2009	→ Mallorca (loan)	48	(1)
2011–2012	Neuchâtel Xamax	16	(0)
2012–2016	Levante	109	(2)
2016–2017	Alcorcón	38	(3)
Total		364	(16)

International career
2005	Spain	0	(0)
- * Club domestic league appearances and goals

David Navarro Pedrós (Valencian pronunciation: [daˈvit naˈvaro]; born 25 May 1980) is a Spanish retired professional footballer who played as a central defender.

He amassed La Liga totals of 254 matches and ten goals over 15 seasons, representing in the competition Valencia, Mallorca and Levante.

== Club career ==
=== Valencia ===
Born in Sagunto, Valencian Community, Navarro was a product of local Valencia CF's youth ranks. He appeared sporadically for the 2002 and 2004 champions of La Liga; he added a rare goal on 26 February 2004 in a UEFA Cup win over Beşiktaş JK (3–2 home win, achieved in the last minute), as the Che eventually emerged victorious in the tournament.

On 6 March 2007, Navarro sparked an on-pitch melee that occurred during a UEFA Champions League tie against Inter Milan. He had spent the match on the bench as an unused substitute, but ran onto the pitch as the brawl began with an exchange of words and what appeared to be a kick by fellow defender Carlos Marchena at Inter counterpart Nicolás Burdisso. Subsequently, he punched Burdisso in the face, breaking the Argentine's nose while he was being held back by his teammates, then proceeded to run away, chased by opposing players Iván Córdoba, Julio Cruz and Maicon all the way to the tunnel.

As the scuffles continued on the field, Navarro sought refuge in the Valencia dressing room. Inter goalkeeper Francesco Toldo entered the Valencia dressing room to confront the Spaniard, while Inter players Esteban Cambiasso and Luís Figo argued with the security personnel that tried to prevent them from entering the Valencia dressing room too. On 7 March 2007, UEFA charged Marchena and Navarro, as well as Burdisso, Córdoba and Maicon, with "gross unsporting conduct." Navarro later apologised for his involvement in the incident, stating he was "very sorry and ashamed" for his actions and also noted he would contact Burdisso to apologise; the following week, after reviewing video evidence of the brawl, UEFA suspended Navarro for seven months from European football (it was later reduced to six months); on the 20th, after several appeals to FIFA to allow the ban to cover both domestic and international games, he had his ban applied to all fixtures, ending with the closure of the 2006–07 campaign.

In 2007–08, Navarro spent one year on loan at RCD Mallorca, where he was used as a backup, appearing in 18 games and returning to the Mestalla Stadium in June 2008 only to be immediately loaned again to the Balearic Islands team until the end of the following season, where he now featured prominently – 29 matches – scoring in a 2–3 home loss to Recreativo de Huelva on 7 December 2008.

Navarro returned to Valencia for 2009–10, going on to serve as captain after replacing longtime incumbent David Albelda, but eventually being stripped of that honour by the same manager, Unai Emery. He contributed two goals in 19 games during the campaign, all as starter, as they finished third and qualified for the Champions League.

=== Later career ===
Navarro had his first abroad experience in summer 2011, joining his compatriots Javier Arizmendi, Joaquín Caparrós (coach) and Víctor Sánchez at Neuchâtel Xamax FCS and penning a 2+1 contract. He was released the following transfer window, however, due to the Swiss club's severe financial problems.

In early February 2012, Navarro returned to his homeland and signed with Levante UD from the top flight, until the end of the season. On 26 July 2016, after suffering relegation, the 36-year-old moved to second-tier side AD Alcorcón.

On 22 December 2017, Navarro announced his retirement from professional football, and was immediately included in Alcorcón's backroom staff. On 19 June 2019, he returned to former club Levante as coordinator of the sports management team, leaving two years later.

== International career ==
Navarro received his first call-up to the Spain senior squad in March 2005, when coach Luis Aragonés named him among five uncapped players for a friendly against China (26 March, Salamanca) and a 2006 FIFA World Cup qualification match away to Serbia and Montenegro (30 March, Belgrade). He later withdrew from the squad after suffering a left-leg muscle injury, and did not travel for the qualifier; no replacement was called up. As a result, he did not win a full international cap.

== Style of play ==
In December 2013, Spanish football website El Gol Digital ranked Navarro at third in its list of the world's dirtiest footballers.

== Honours ==
Valencia

- La Liga: 2001–02, 2003–04
- UEFA Cup: 2003–04
- UEFA Super Cup: 2004
