= Carlos Marchena =

Spanish footballer (born 1979)

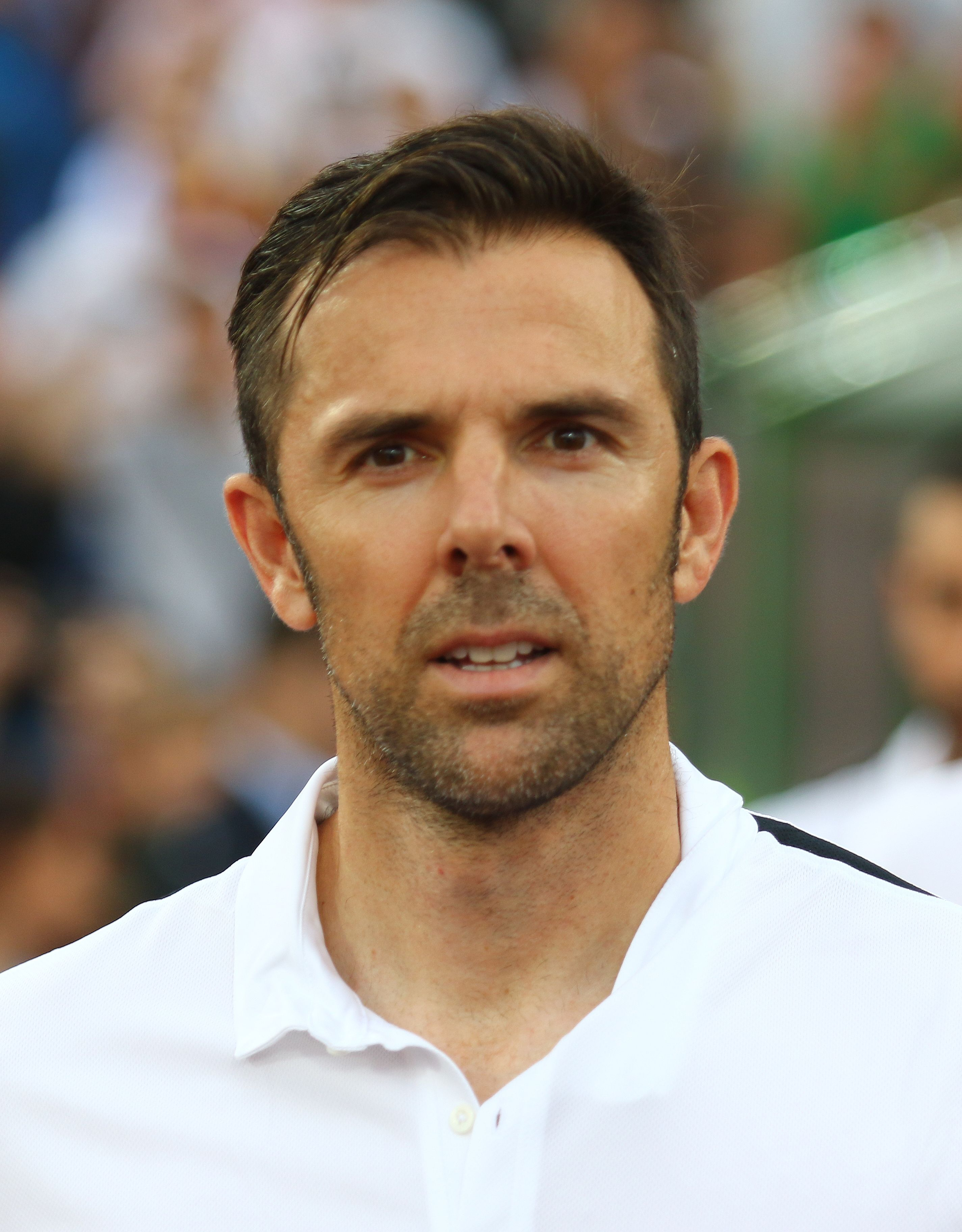
- Marchena in 2017

Personal information
- Full name: Carlos Marchena López
- Date of birth: 31 July 1979 (age 47)
- Place of birth: Las Cabezas, Spain
- Height: 1.82 m (6 ft 0 in)
- Positions: Centre-back; defensive midfielder

Youth career
- Cabecense
- 1990–1997: Sevilla

Senior career*
Years	Team	Apps	(Gls)
1997–2000	Sevilla	68	(1)
1998	Sevilla B	3	(0)
2000–2001	Benfica	20	(2)
2001–2010	Valencia	230	(8)
2010–2012	Villarreal	45	(1)
2012–2014	Deportivo La Coruña	44	(5)
2015	Kerala Blasters	1	(0)
Total		411	(17)

International career
1999	Spain U20	7	(0)
1999–2001	Spain U21	17	(0)
2000	Spain U23	5	(0)
2002–2011	Spain	69	(2)

Managerial career
- 2017–2018: Sevilla C (assistant)
- 2018: Spain (assistant)
- 2019–2020: Sevilla B (assistant)
- 2023: Valencia (assistant)
Medal record
Representing Spain
Men's Football
Summer Olympic Games
Silver medal – second place	2000 Sidney	Team
FIFA World Cup
Winner	2010 South Africa	Team
UEFA European Championship
Winner	2008 Austria – Switzerland	Team
FIFA World Youth Championship
Winner	1999 Nigeria
- * Club domestic league appearances and goals

Carlos Marchena López (Spanish pronunciation: [ˈkaɾlos maɾˈtʃena ˈlopeθ]; born 31 July 1979) is a Spanish former professional footballer. Mainly a central defender with an aggressive approach, he also played as a defensive midfielder.

Most of his career (nine years) was spent at Valencia, where he helped the club to win five major titles, including two La Liga championships. He amassed competition totals 330 matches and 11 goals over 13 seasons, also playing for Sevilla, Villarreal and Deportivo.

A Spain international for the better part of the 2000s, Marchena won 69 caps and represented the national team in two World Cups and two European Championships, winning each tournament once. Marchena holds the record for the longest unbeaten streak by a national team player after having a 57-matches unbeaten run with the Spain national football team.

== Club career ==
=== Early years ===
Born in Las Cabezas de San Juan, Province of Seville, Andalusia, Marchena started his professional career in hometown club Sevilla at the age of 18, when the club was in the Segunda División. He made his La Liga debut on 22 August 1999, playing the entire 2–2 home draw with Real Sociedad.

When Sevilla were relegated again at the end of the season, Marchena earned a transfer to Portugal's Benfica. During his spell in Lisbon he scored in two narrow wins, at home against Belenenses (1–0) and at Salgueiros (2–1), but almost left the Estádio da Luz in late 2000 due to lack of payment.

=== Valencia ===
Marchena returned to his country in summer 2001 as he signed a four-year contract with Valencia, with Zlatko Zahovič moving in the opposite direction. Having signed as a cover for ageing Miroslav Đukić, he took a while to impress in his first season (16 appearances), as Valencia clinched their first league title in 30 years, but gradually became first choice.

In the 2003–04 campaign, with the side capturing an historic league and UEFA Cup double, Marchena played a pivotal role in defence, teaming up with Roberto Ayala; the former played 44 games in all competitions, the latter 45.

2004–05 was not a very successful season for Valencia, as under new coach Claudio Ranieri the team struggled both domestically and in European tournaments. In a UEFA Champions League group-stage match against Werder Bremen at the Weser-Stadion, Marchena was also given his marching orders in the early minutes of the second half (2–1 defeat) and his team was eventually eliminated from the elite competition; he remained a regular at both defensive positions.

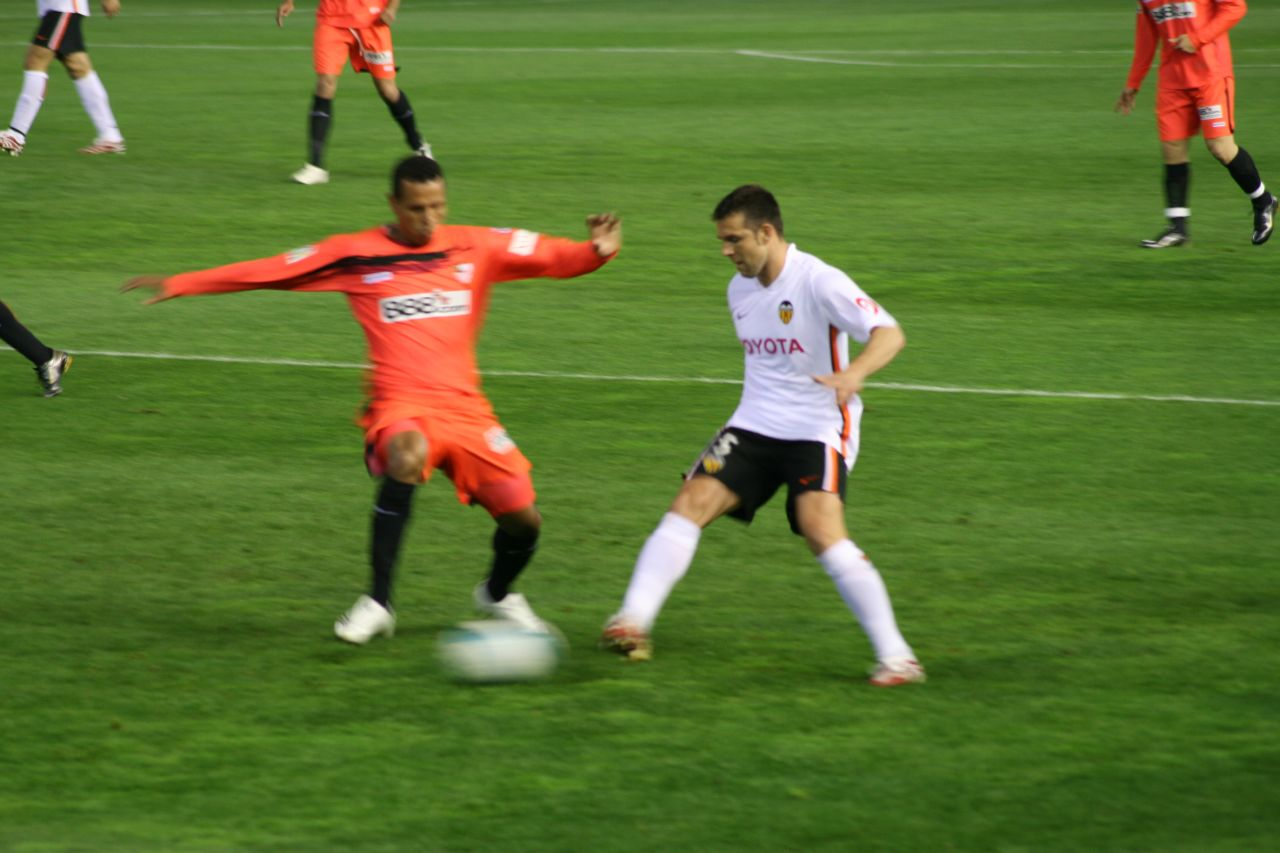
Marchena (right) tackling Sevilla's Luís Fabiano in 2007

During the Champions League match against Inter Milan on 6 March 2007, Marchena was involved in the on-pitch melee sparked by his teammate David Navarro: the former appeared to kick Inter defender Nicolás Burdisso after an angry exchange of words and, after the latter punched the Argentine's nose, a scuffle took place with several of Burdisso's teammates chasing Navarro all the way into the dressing room.

Consequently, Marchena, Navarro and several other Inter players involved were later charged with "gross unsporting conduct" by UEFA after the investigation. Both clubs were fined £106,000 while Marchena was banned for four games; after Euro 2008 he was selected by his teammates as the new captain, although he missed the first two months of the new season due to injury.

In the 2009–10 campaign, veteran Marchena contributed 24 appearances as the Che finished third and returned to the Champions League. He scored in two 3–1 away victories, over Osasuna and Xerez, only being booked seven times.

=== Villarreal ===
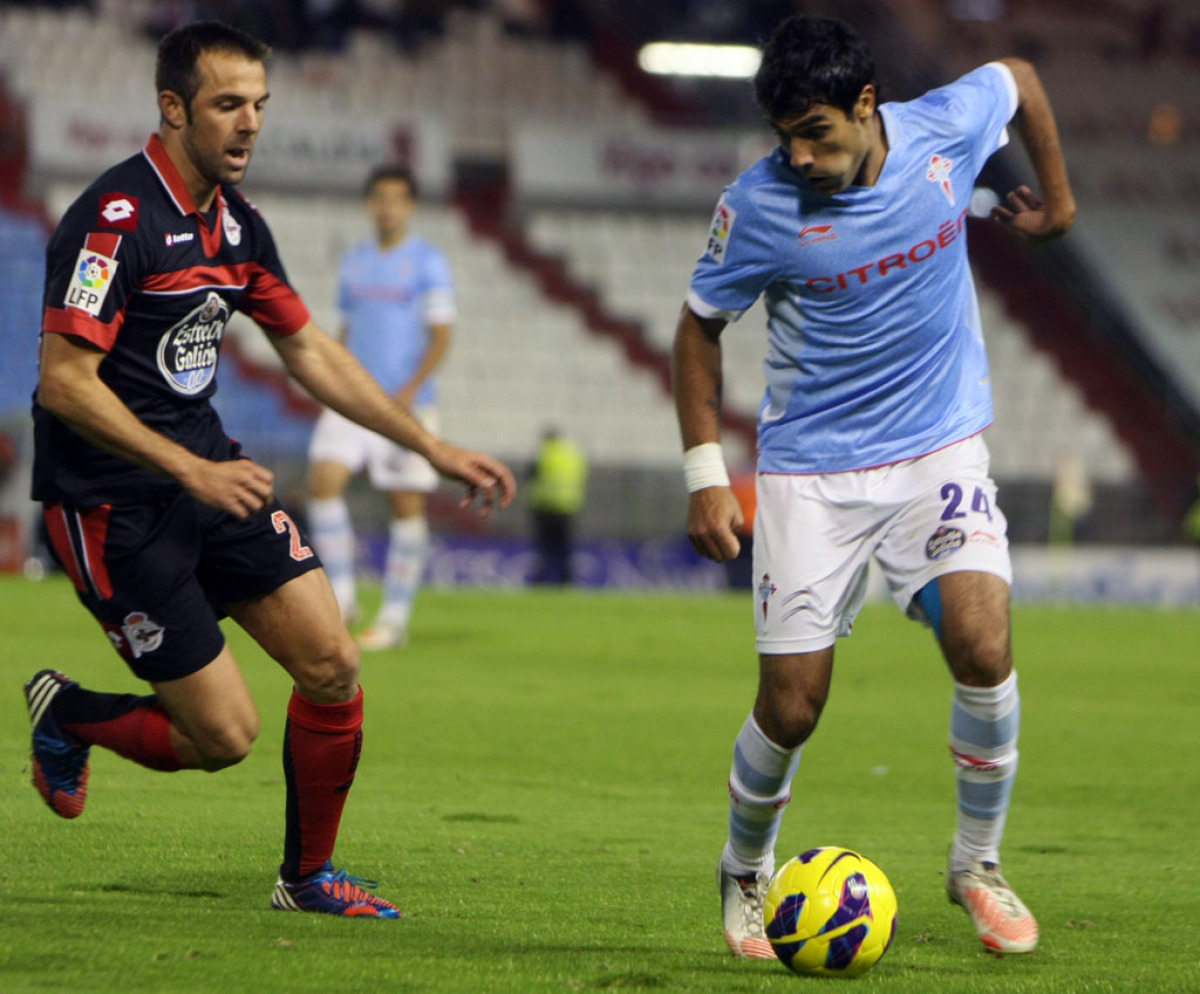
Marchena (left) challenging Augusto Fernández in the Galician derby in 2012

On 1 August 2010, the 31-year-old Marchena joined Villarreal for three years. He made his competitive debut for the Valencians 18 days later, opening the 5–0 home win against Dnepr Mogilev in that campaign's Europa League. Regularly used in both defensive positions again, he scored his second goal for the Yellow Submarine on 7 April 2011, in a 5–1 home rout of Twente in the first leg of the competition's quarter-finals.

Marchena left at the end of 2011–12 after being released from contract, and his team also suffered relegation.

=== Later career ===
In the 2012 off-season, Marchena initially moved to Deportivo de La Coruña on a one-year deal. The Galicians were eventually relegated, but he chose to remain for a further season in spite of more lucrative offers.

Following Deportivo's return to the top flight in 2014, Marchena left the club; he remained unemployed until 1 August 2015 when he signed for Indian Super League side Kerala Blasters as its marquee player. After missing the start of the season with injury, he made his debut on 18 October in a 0–1 home loss to Delhi Dynamos. On 4 November, he left for personal reasons.

After a period of training with amateurs Gerena, Marchena announced his retirement in January 2016. On 7 June of the following year he returned to his first club Sevilla, being appointed assistant manager of the C team.

Marchena then had assistant spells at Sevilla Atlético and Valencia, respectively under his former teammates Paco Gallardo and Rubén Baraja.

== International career ==
Marchena first appeared for Spain as part of the under-20 team alongside Iker Casillas and Xavi, finishing first at the 1999 FIFA World Youth Championship. He was also on the roster for the 2000 Summer Olympics, winning the silver medal.

Marchena made his senior debut on 21 August 2002, in a testimonial match for Hungarian legend Ferenc Puskás in Budapest just after the 2002 FIFA World Cup in South Korea and Japan. Subsequently, he was part of the squad at UEFA Euro 2004, where he was chosen at the last minute by coach Iñaki Sáez as a strategic move to bolster his side defensively; while Spain bowed out after the group phase, he did manage two appearances, but picked up two yellow cards in the process.

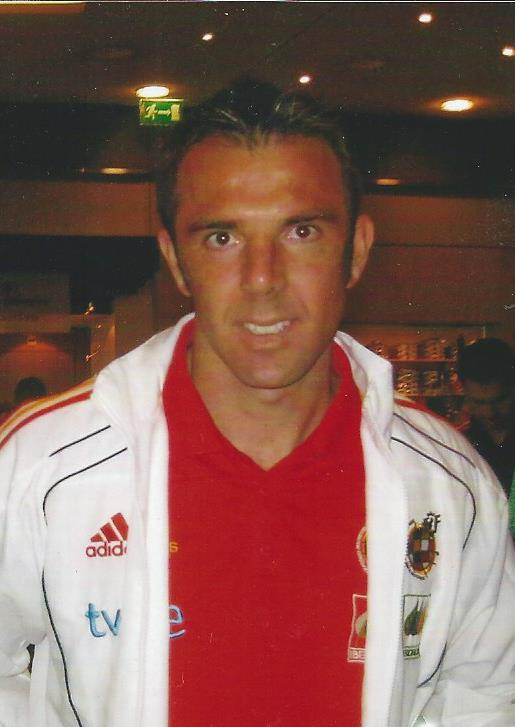
Marchena with Spain in 2010

On 8 June 2005, Marchena scored his first international goal, a last-minute equaliser in a 1–1 draw in Bosnia and Herzegovina for the 2006 World Cup qualifiers, played in Valencia. He was picked for the finals, but only played the last group fixture against Saudi Arabia.

Marchena was selected again by Luis Aragonés for Euro 2008, this time as undisputed starter, having also featured prominently in the qualifying stages. With Joan Capdevila, Carles Puyol and Sergio Ramos, he formed a rock-solid defense and conceded only two goals in five games, his hard work and man-marking skills earning him a spot in the team of the tournament.

Under new coach Vicente del Bosque, Marchena slowly lost his spot to Gerard Piqué, but was still included in the 2009 FIFA Confederations Cup and the 2010 World Cup squads. As Spain downed Saudi Arabia on 29 May 2010 in preparation for the latter competition (where he featured six minutes in the 1–0 quarter-final win over Paraguay, adding two injury-time appearances for the champions), he played his 50th consecutive undefeated match with the national team, surpassing previous holder Garrincha (49).

In June 2018, Marchena was allowed by Sevilla to join newly appointed Fernando Hierro's coaching staff for the upcoming World Cup in Russia.

== Career statistics ==
=== Club ===
Appearances and goals by club, season and competition
Club	Season	League			Cup (Note: Includes Copa del Rey and Supercopa de España)		Continental (Note: Includes UEFA Cup, UEFA Champions League, UEFA Super Cup and UEFA Intertoto Cup)		Total	
Club	Season	Division	Apps	Goals	Apps	Goals	Apps	Goals	Apps	Goals
Sevilla	1997–98	Segunda División	17	0	0	0	0	0	17	0
Sevilla	1998–99	Segunda División	18	1	8	0	0	0	26	0
Sevilla	1999–00	La Liga	33	0	0	0	0	0	33	0
Sevilla	Total		68	1	8	0	0	0	76	1
Benfica	2000–01	Primeira Liga	20	2	0	0	0	0	20	2
Valencia	2001–02	La Liga	16	1	1	0	5	0	22	1
Valencia	2002–03	La Liga	26	0	4	0	9	0	39	0
Valencia	2003–04	La Liga	31	2	5	0	8	0	44	2
Valencia	2004–05	La Liga	32	2	1	0	6	0	39	2
Valencia	2005–06	La Liga	25	0	4	0	3	0	32	0
Valencia	2006–07	La Liga	22	0	2	0	4	0	28	0
Valencia	2007–08	La Liga	28	0	8	0	7	0	43	0
Valencia	2008–09	La Liga	26	1	4	1	7	1	37	3
Valencia	2009–10	La Liga	24	2	3	1	8	0	35	3
Valencia	Total		230	8	32	2	57	1	319	11
Villarreal	2010–11	La Liga	28	1	0	0	12	2	40	3
Villarreal	2011–12	La Liga	17	0	1	0	6	1	24	1
Villarreal	Total		45	1	1	0	18	3	64	4
Deportivo	2012–13	La Liga	22	2	1	0	0	0	23	2
Deportivo	2013–14	Segunda División	22	3	1	0	0	0	23	3
Deportivo	Total		44	5	2	0	0	0	46	5
Kerala Blasters	2015	Indian Super League	1	0	0	0	0	0	1	0
Career total			408	17	43	2	75	4	526	23

=== International ===
Appearances and goals by national team and year
National team	Year	Apps	Goals
Spain	2002	3	0
Spain	2003	9	0
Spain	2004	9	0
Spain	2005	6	1
Spain	2006	1	0
Spain	2007	10	1
Spain	2008	10	0
Spain	2009	8	0
Spain	2010	11	0
Spain	2011	2	0
Total		69	2

Scores and results list Spain's goal tally first, score column indicates score after each Marchena goal.

List of international goals scored by Carlos Marchena
No.	Date	Venue	Opponent	Score	Result	Competition
1	8 June 2005	Mestalla, Valencia, Spain	Bosnia and Herzegovina	1–1	1–1	2006 FIFA World Cup qualification
2	22 August 2007	Toumba, Thessaloniki, Greece	Greece	1–1	3–2	Friendly

== Honours ==
Valencia

- La Liga: 2001–02, 2003–04
- Copa del Rey: 2007–08
- UEFA Cup: 2003–04
- UEFA Super Cup: 2004

Spain U20

- FIFA World Youth Championship: 1999

Spain U23

- Summer Olympic silver medal: 2000

Spain

- FIFA World Cup: 2010
- UEFA European Championship: 2008
- FIFA Confederations Cup third place: 2009

Individual

- UEFA Euro 2008: Team of the tournament
