= Vicente Rodríguez =

Spanish footballer

Vicente
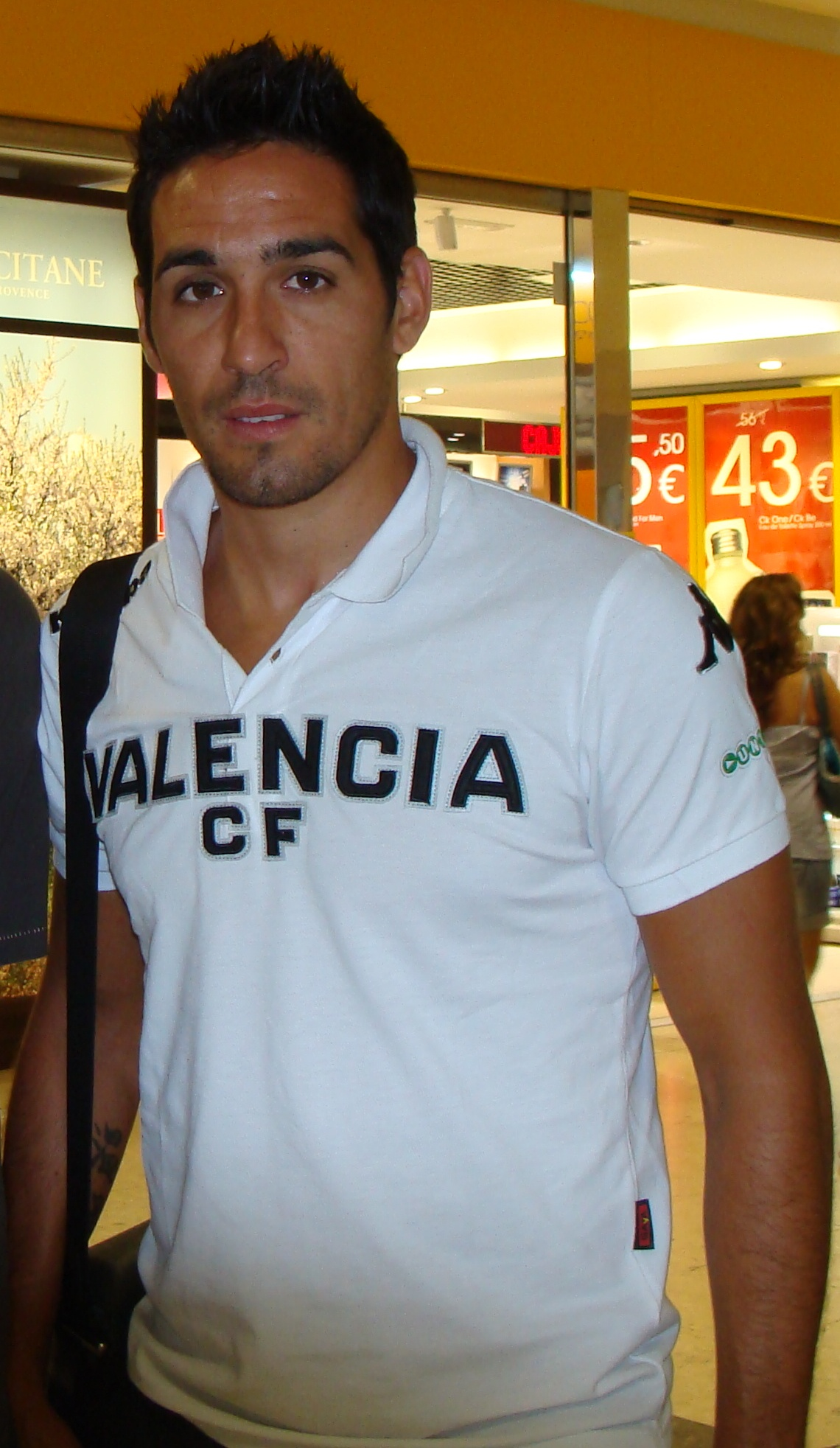
- Vicente with Valencia in 2010

Personal information
- Full name: Vicente Rodríguez Guillén
- Date of birth: 16 July 1981 (age 45)
- Place of birth: Valencia, Spain
- Height: 1.75 m (5 ft 9 in)
- Position: Winger

Youth career
- Benicalap
- Levante

Senior career*
Years	Team	Apps	(Gls)
1997–2000	Levante	60	(9)
2000–2011	Valencia	243	(36)
2011–2013	Brighton & Hove Albion	29	(5)
Total		332	(50)

International career
1997–1998	Spain U16	11	(1)
1998–1999	Spain U17	15	(6)
1999–2000	Spain U18	7	(1)
2000–2001	Spain U21	11	(1)
2001–2005	Spain	38	(3)
- * Club domestic league appearances and goals

Vicente Rodríguez Guillén (Spanish pronunciation: [biˈθente roˈðɾiɣeθ ɣiˈʎen]; born 16 July 1981), known simply as Vicente, nicknamed El puñal de Benicalap (The dagger of Benicalap), is a Spanish former professional footballer.

A left winger with outstanding technique, pace and scoring ability, his career, blighted by constant injuries, was mainly associated with Valencia with whom he appeared in 340 competitive matches over 11 seasons, winning five major titles including two La Liga championships.

Vicente represented Spain in the first half of the 2000s, and played at Euro 2004.

== Club career ==
=== Levante ===
A Valencia CF supporter since childhood, Valencia-born Vicente started his professional career in the community with Segunda División side Levante UD, making his professional debut on 23 November 1997 against CD Leganés aged only 16.

He immediately attracted attention of leading teams like Arsenal, Valencia CF and Real Madrid but, eventually, Valencia (and its sporting director Javier Subirats) convinced the youngster to sign for the club.

=== Valencia ===
Vicente joined Valencia in the summer of 2000. Initially, his favoured position of left winger was occupied by Argentine Kily González but, despite serious contention for a first-team place, he still managed to net five goals in 33 La Liga matches, adding 13 appearances in that season's UEFA Champions League although he was left on the bench for the final against FC Bayern Munich.

The arrival of Rafael Benítez as coach in 2001–02 would mark Vicente's opportunity to prove himself, and his progress coincided with the club's first league title in 31 years. While appearing in fewer games (31) he was already first-choice, and produced similar numbers the following campaign, his only goal coming in a 3–0 home win over Recreativo de Huelva.

2003–04 was Vicente's finest season as his efforts propelled the Che to their second league under Benítez, adding two goals in seven matches in the team's victorious run in the UEFA Cup, including one in the final where he also assisted Mista in the second (the pair combined for 30 league goals, 12 from Vicente, a career-best, with Francisco Rufete being deployed in the right flank).

After a productive year, Vicente agreed to a further four-year extension, stating: "I'm happy to remain at Valencia because I was born here and it's my home." In the 2004–05 season, however, under the management of Claudio Ranieri, the coach opted to favour fellow Italian Emiliano Moretti to provide support for him rather than to let him have a free role along the left; furthermore, ankle injuries hindered his campaign. As he returned, the manager had already been sacked, Valencia ranked seventh and he only made 12 league appearances. In the following year more of the same, as the side finished 11 points behind eventual champions FC Barcelona and he was again bothered by an ankle condition.

"It is clear that he is one of the best players. Some footballers are a little more than others and Vicente is one of them".

— Claudio Ranieri, former Valencia manager.

Vicente was again often injured in 2006–07, most notably in the first leg of a Champions League quarter-final tie with Chelsea which ended his campaign. The English won 3–2 on aggregate while the player only took part in 16 league matches, with his team ending fourth.

Vicente made an impressive comeback, opening the 3–0 victory against IF Elfsborg in the Champions League third qualifying round at the Mestalla Stadium. However, another injury occurred shortly after, this time during training, and he endured another large spell in the sidelines.

Disappointed, the player publicly blamed the medical staff for his continuing injuries:

"My morale is very low. I've lost all confidence in the medical staff, that's it. I've been defending them for the last two years, but I don't see any of this situation improving, when I'm still not recovered from one injury I get worse, or suffer from another one. They give me an injection and then I can't move myself for a week because of the pain".

"On top of this, then they tell me maybe my injury doesn't exist, and it is psychological. It's very hard, I can't stand it any longer. I've lost all confidence in the doctor, but I don't want to be bad to anyone, but the person who loses the most is me, because I can neither play football nor help my teammates. I only ask to play twenty minutes in one go.

"That is the worst part about it all, to know that when I have the opportunity to play with good health, things turn out well for me, and I play well, I can help the team," he concluded.

Valencia responded that they would open disciplinary proceedings against Vicente after these statements, citing: 'The club will take the necessary action against the player depending on whether his conduct is considered a 'serious' or 'very serious' offence under internal regulations'. The "injury saga" came to an end when the player was fined €1,200 following controversial remarks made regarding the club's medical staff.

In 2008–09, although playing fewer minutes, Vicente was able to contribute more regularly, while competing for first-choice status with young Juan Mata. He came from the bench in the season opener, a 3–0 home defeat of RCD Mallorca, and, majorly used as a substitute (usually for Mata) during the season, still contributed six league goals.

Vicente's fitness problems persisted the following campaign, as he only made his first appearance on 6 January 2010, replacing Mata for the final 15 minutes of the 1–2 home loss against Deportivo de La Coruña in the first leg of the Copa del Rey's round of 16. Aged 29, he was released after a link that lasted 11 years.

=== Brighton & Hove Albion ===
On 2 September 2011, Vicente signed a one-year deal with Football League Championship side Brighton & Hove Albion. He made his official debut on the 21st, in a 1–2 home loss against Liverpool in the third round of Football League Cup, winning a penalty which resulted in the Ashley Barnes goal.

Vicente scored his first goal for the club in a 3–1 defeat away to Ipswich Town on 1 October 2011. However, he was afflicted by injury soon after, and was out for over three months; he returned on 4 February 2012 to provide the assist for Will Buckley in the 1–0 victory over Leicester City. The following weekend, also from the bench, he set up two goals in a 2–1 win against Leeds United at Elland Road.

On 10 March 2012, Brighton beat Portsmouth 2–0 at home, with Vicente scoring a brace – including one from a low free kick – lifting his team into the play-off places and stretching their unbeaten run to 12 games. In May 2013, after only 13 appearances during the season, he was released alongside Gary Dicker and Marcos Painter; following his departure, he described his former boss Gus Poyet as "the worst person I've come across in football", "selfish" and "egocentric".

On 17 April 2014, Vicente announced his retirement from football. He returned to work with Valencia as a member of the technical staff from 2016 to 2018, before coming back once again to take on ambassadorial duties with the club in January 2023.

== International career ==
Vicente made his debut for Spain in a friendly against France on 28 March 2001, replacing Pedro Munitis in the 72nd minute of a 2–1 win at Mestalla. He was overlooked for the 2002 FIFA World Cup, co-hosted by South Korea and Japan.

Vicente appeared in his only international tournament at UEFA Euro 2004 in Portugal, playing three complete group-stage matches.

== Career statistics ==
=== Club ===
Appearances and goals by club, season and competition
Club	Season	League			Cup		Europe		Total	
Club	Season	Division	Apps	Goals	Apps	Goals	Apps	Goals	Apps	Goals
Levante	1997–98	Segunda División	3	1	0	0	—		3	1
Levante	1998–99	Segunda División B	21	2	3	0	—		24	2
Levante	1999–00	Segunda División	36	7	1	0	—		36	7
Levante	Total		60	9	4	0	—		64	9
Valencia	2000–01	La Liga	33	5	2	1	14	0	48	6
Valencia	2001–02	La Liga	31	2	1	0	8	1	39	3
Valencia	2002–03	La Liga	28	1	2	0	11	0	39	1
Valencia	2003–04	La Liga	33	12	4	1	7	2	42	14
Valencia	2004–05	La Liga	12	3	1	1	4	2	15	5
Valencia	2005–06	La Liga	21	3	1	0	5	0	22	3
Valencia	2006–07	La Liga	16	4	0	0	5	0	21	4
Valencia	2007–08	La Liga	17	0	6	1	4	1	25	2
Valencia	2008–09	La Liga	27	6	8	4	5	0	38	10
Valencia	2009–10	La Liga	11	0	2	0	2	0	13	0
Valencia	2010–11	La Liga	14	1	3	2	2	0	17	3
Valencia	Total		243	36	30	10	67	6	340	52
Brighton & Hove Albion	2011–12	Championship	17	3	2	0	0	0	19	3
Brighton & Hove Albion	2012–13	Championship	12	2	1	0	0	0	13	2
Brighton & Hove Albion	Total		29	5	3	0	0	0	32	5
Career total			332	50	37	10	67	6	436	66

=== International ===
Appearances and goals by national team and year
National team	Year	Apps	Goals
Spain	2001	3	0
Spain	2002	7	0
Spain	2003	10	1
Spain	2004	9	1
Spain	2005	9	1
Total		38	3

Scores and results list Spain's goal tally first, score column indicates score after each Vicente goal.

List of international goals scored by Vicente
No.	Date	Venue	Opponent	Score	Result	Competition
1	19 November 2003	Ullevaal Stadion, Oslo, Norway	Norway	2–0	3–0	UEFA Euro 2004 qualifying
2	8 September 2004	Bilino Polje Stadium, Zenica, Bosnia and Herzegovina	Bosnia and Herzegovina	1–0	1–1	2006 FIFA World Cup qualification
3	17 August 2005	El Molinón, Gijón, Spain	Uruguay	2–0	2–0	Friendly

== Honours ==
Valencia

- La Liga: 2001–02, 2003–04
- Copa del Rey: 2007–08
- UEFA Cup: 2003–04
- UEFA Super Cup: 2004

Individual

- Don Balón Award: 2003–04
