= 2000–01 UEFA Champions League qualifying rounds =

European football tournament

The qualifying rounds for the 2000–01 UEFA Champions League began on 12 July and ended on 23 August 2000. In total, there were three qualifying rounds which provided 16 clubs to join the group stage.

Times are CEST (UTC+2), as listed by UEFA.

== Teams ==
Key to colours
Qualify for the group stage
Eliminated in the Third qualifying round; Advanced to the UEFA Cup first round

Third qualifying round
Team	Coeff.
(Italy) Internazionale	79.964
(Spain) Valencia	69.799
(Portugal) Porto	61.275
(France) Lyon	60.364
(Netherlands) Feyenoord	60.333
(Italy) Milan	53.964
(Turkey) Galatasaray	51.925
(Ukraine) Dynamo Kyiv	51.583
(Russia) Lokomotiv Moscow	48.638
(Greece) Panathinaikos	44.433
(England) Leeds United	43.728
(Czech Republic) Sparta Prague	43.562
(Germany) Hamburger SV	30.201
(Germany) 1860 Munich	29.201
(Croatia) Dinamo Zagreb	26.062
(Austria) Tirol Innsbruck	11.250
(Switzerland) St. Gallen	10.500
(Denmark) Herfølge	9.087

Second qualifying round
Team	Coeff.
(Czech Republic) Slavia Prague	56.562
(Norway) Rosenborg	51.050
(Denmark) Brøndby	34.088
(Scotland) Rangers	32.250
(Belgium) Anderlecht	27.525
(Turkey) Beşiktaş	26.925
(Austria) Sturm Graz	26.250
(Sweden) Helsingborgs IF	16.766
(Ukraine) Shakhtar Donetsk	15.583
(Romania) Dinamo București	10.917
(Slovenia) Maribor	10.916
(Slovakia) Inter Slovnaft Bratislava	10.416
(Croatia) Hajduk Split	10.062
(Poland) Polonia Warsaw	9.000
(Cyprus) Anorthosis Famagusta	8.749
(Hungary) Dunaferr	7.708
(Israel) Hapoel Tel Aviv	6.771
(Georgia (country)) Torpedo Kutaisi	4.833

Team	Coeff.
First qualifying round
(Federal Republic of Yugoslavia) Red Star Belgrade	12.708
(Bulgaria) Levski Sofia	9.270
(Latvia) Skonto	9.166
(Moldova) Zimbru Chișinău	8.167
(Iceland) KR	4.166
(Finland) Haka	4.021
(Belarus) BATE Borisov	3.792
(North Macedonia) Sloga Jugomagnat	2.540
(Lithuania) Kaunas	2.332
(Estonia) Levadia Maardu	1.291
(Wales) Total Network Solutions	1.166
(Armenia) Shirak	1.125
(Republic of Ireland) Shelbourne	0.832
(Malta) Birkirkara	0.749
(Northern Ireland) Linfield	0.749
(Faroe Islands) KÍ	0.707
(Luxembourg) F91 Dudelange	0.666
(Azerbaijan) Shamkir	0.625
(Albania) Tirana	0.416
(Bosnia and Herzegovina) Brotnjo	0.250

== First qualifying round ==
The draw for this round was performed on 23 June 2000 in Geneva, Switzerland.

=== Seeding ===
Seeded	Unseeded
(Federal Republic of Yugoslavia) Red Star Belgrade (Bulgaria) Levski Sofia (Latvia) Skonto (Moldova) Zimbru Chișinău (Iceland) KR (Finland) Haka (Belarus) BATE Borisov (North Macedonia) Sloga Jugomagnat (Lithuania) Kaunas (Estonia) Levadia Maardu	(Wales) Total Network Solutions (Armenia) Shirak (Republic of Ireland) Shelbourne (Malta) Birkirkara (Northern Ireland) Linfield (Faroe Islands) KÍ (Luxembourg) F91 Dudelange (Azerbaijan) Shamkir (Albania) Tirana (Bosnia and Herzegovina) Brotnjo

=== Summary ===
Team 1	Agg.	Team 2	1st leg	2nd leg
Birkirkara (Malta)	2–6	(Iceland) KR	1–2	1–4
F91 Dudelange (Luxembourg)	0–6	(Bulgaria) Levski Sofia	0–4	0–2
Haka (Finland)	2–2 (a)	(Northern Ireland) Linfield	1–0	1–2
KÍ (Faroe Islands)	0–5	(Federal Republic of Yugoslavia) Red Star Belgrade	0–3	0–2
Total Network Solutions (Wales)	2–6	(Estonia) Levadia Maardu	2–2	0–4
Shirak (Armenia)	2–3	(Belarus) BATE Borisov	1–1	1–2
Skonto (Latvia)	3–5	(Azerbaijan) Shamkir	2–1	1–4 (a.e.t.)
Sloga Jugomagnat (North Macedonia)	1–2	(Republic of Ireland) Shelbourne	0–1	1–1
Tirana (Albania)	4–6	(Moldova) Zimbru Chișinău	2–3	2–3
Kaunas (Lithuania)	4–3	(Bosnia and Herzegovina) Brotnjo	4–0	0–3

=== Matches ===
12 July 2000
19:30

Birkirkara (Malta)	1–2	(Iceland) KR
Nwoko 45'	Report	Sigþórsson 47'; Júlíusson 72'

Ta' Qali National Stadium, Ta' Qali
Attendance: 848
Referee: Georgios Douros (Greece)
19 July 2000
22:00

KR (Iceland)	4–1	(Malta) Birkirkara
Winnie 16'; Benediktsson 45'; Sigþórsson 58', 63'	Report	Spiteri 52'

KR-völlur, Reykjavík
Attendance: 1,844
Referee: Simon Jones (Wales)

KR won 6–2 on aggregate.

12 July 2000
20:00

F91 Dudelange (Luxembourg)	0–4	(Bulgaria) Levski Sofia
	Report	Ivanov 11', 87'; Ivankov 16' (pen.); Tsykhmeystruk 68'

Stade Jos Nosbaum, Dudelange
Attendance: 1,121
Referee: Herbert Fandel (Germany)
19 July 2000
20:00

Levski Sofia (Bulgaria)	2–0	(Luxembourg) F91 Dudelange
Ivanov 35', 52' (pen.)	Report

Georgi Asparuhov Stadium, Sofia
Attendance: 5,284
Referee: Paul Allaerts (Belgium)

Levski Sofia won 6–0 on aggregate.

12 July 2000
19:00

Haka (Finland)	1–0	(Northern Ireland) Linfield
Wilson 56'	Report

Tehtaan kenttä, Valkeakoski
Attendance: 1,799
Referee: Nikolai Ivanov (Russia)
19 July 2000
20:45

Linfield (Northern Ireland)	2–1	(Finland) Haka
Ferguson 22' (pen.), 72'	Report	Kovács 85' (pen.)

Windsor Park, Belfast
Attendance: 3,587
Referee: Egill Mar Markusson (Iceland)

2–2 on aggregate; Haka won on away goals.

12 July 2000
19:00

KÍ (Faroe Islands)	0–3	(Federal Republic of Yugoslavia) Red Star Belgrade
	Report	Drulić 44'; Stevanović 68'; Mirković 90'

Svangaskarð, Toftir (Note: KÍ played their home match at Svangaskarð stadium in Toftir, instead of their regular home venue Við Djúpumýrar stadium in Klaksvík.)
Attendance: 950
Referee: Kjell Alseth (Norway)
19 July 2000
20:00

Red Star Belgrade (Federal Republic of Yugoslavia)	2–0	(Faroe Islands) KÍ
Bošković 10' (pen.); Drulić 17'	Report

Red Star Stadium, Belgrade
Attendance: 8,000
Referee: Zsolt Szabó (Hungary)

Red Star Belgrade won 5–0 on aggregate.

12 July 2000
20:30

Total Network Solutions (Wales)	2–2	(Estonia) Levadia Maardu
Wright 62'; Toner 89'	Report	Bragin 50'; Krasnopjorov 88'

Racecourse Ground, Wrexham (Note: Total Network Solutions played their home match at Racecourse Ground in Wrexham, instead of their regular home venue Recreation Ground stadium in Llansantffraid.)
Attendance: 1,432
Referee: Joseph Attard (Malta)
19 July 2000
17:00

Levadia Maardu (Estonia)	4–0	(Wales) Total Network Solutions
Krõm 49'; Fenin 58'; Tšelnokov 60'; Edwards 64' (o.g.)	Report

Kadriorg Stadium, Tallinn
Attendance: 2,000
Referee: Jørn West Larsen (Denmark)

Levadia Maardu won 6–2 on aggregate.

12 July 2000
15:00

Shirak (Armenia)	1–1	(Belarus) BATE Borisov
Tahmazyan 30'	Report	Kutuzov 24'

Gyumri City Stadium, Gyumri
Attendance: 1,500
Referee: Michal Beneš (Czech Republic)
19 July 2000
17:30

BATE Borisov (Belarus)	2–1	(Armenia) Shirak
Rahozhkin 17'; Lashankow 58'	Report	Tahmazyan 74'

City Stadium, Borisov
Attendance: 2,138
Referee: Ante Kulušić (Croatia)

BATE Borisov won 3–2 on aggregate.

12 July 2000
17:00

Skonto (Latvia)	2–1	(Azerbaijan) Shamkir
Koļesņičenko 57', 90' (pen.)	Report	Kulikov 82'

Skonto Stadium, Riga
Attendance: 3,200
Referee: Dougie McDonald (Scotland)
19 July 2000
15:30

Shamkir (Azerbaijan)	4–1 (a.e.t.)	(Latvia) Skonto
Kvaratskhelia 3', 90', 100'; Kulikov 110'	Report	Samusiovas 31'

Tofiq Bahramov Republican Stadium, Baku (Note: Shamkir played their home matches at Tofiq Bahramov Republican Stadium in Baku, instead of their regular venue Shamkir City Stadium in Şəmkir.)
Attendance: 10,500
Referee: Miroslaw Ryszka (Poland)

Shamkir won 5–3 on aggregate.

12 July 2000
20:00

Sloga Jugomagnat (North Macedonia)	0–1	(Republic of Ireland) Shelbourne
	Report	Baker 85'

Philip II Arena, Skopje (Note: Sloga Jugomagnat played their home match at Philip II Arena in Skopje, instead of their regular home venue Čair Stadium.)
Attendance: 6,000
Referee: Wolfgang Sowa (Austria)
19 July 2000
20:45

Shelbourne (Republic of Ireland)	1–1	(North Macedonia) Sloga Jugomagnat
Haylock 67'	Report	Nuhiji 81'

Tolka Park, Dublin
Attendance: 6,511
Referee: Bruno Derrien (France)

Shelbourne won 2–1 on aggregate.

12 July 2000
17:30

Tirana (Albania)	2–3	(Moldova) Zimbru Chișinău
Dede 14'; Fortuzi 16'	Report	Berco 28', 50'; Boreț 45'

Qemal Stafa Stadium, Tirana
Attendance: 4,200
Referee: Philippe Leuba (Switzerland)
19 July 2000
17:00

Zimbru Chișinău (Moldova)	3–2	(Albania) Tirana
Oprea 9', 34'; Boreț 85'	Report	Dabulla 11'; Kenesei 26'

Stadionul Moldova, Speia (Note: Zimbru Chișinău played their home matches at Stadionul Moldova in Speia, instead of their regular venue Stadionul Republican in Chișinău.)
Attendance: 3,000
Referee: Yiannakis Kyprianides (Cyprus)

Zimbru Chișinău won 6–4 on aggregate.

12 July 2000
18:30

Kaunas (Lithuania)	4–0	(Bosnia and Herzegovina) Brotnjo
Kšanavičius 11', 36'; Žuta 17'; Puotkalis 85'	Report

Darius and Girėnas Stadium, Kaunas
Attendance: 950
Referee: Jack van Hulten (Netherlands)
19 July 2000
17:30

Brotnjo (Bosnia and Herzegovina)	3–0	(Lithuania) Kaunas
Katić 32', 40'; Juričić 37'	Report

Stadion Bare, Čitluk
Attendance: 4,325
Referee: Jozef Kacenga (Slovakia)

Kaunas won 4–3 on aggregate.

== Second qualifying round ==
The draw for this round was performed on 23 June 2000 in Geneva, Switzerland.

=== Seeding ===
Seeded		Unseeded	
(Czech Republic) Slavia Prague (Norway) Rosenborg (Denmark) Brøndby (Scotland) Rangers (Belgium) Anderlecht (Turkey) Beşiktaş (Austria) Sturm Graz	(Sweden) Helsingborgs IF (Ukraine) Shakhtar Donetsk (Federal Republic of Yugoslavia) Red Star Belgrade (Romania) Dinamo București (Slovenia) Maribor (Slovakia) Inter Slovnaft Bratislava (Croatia) Hajduk Split	(Bulgaria) Levski Sofia (Azerbaijan) Shamkir (Poland) Polonia Warsaw (Cyprus) Anorthosis Famagusta (Moldova) Zimbru Chișinău (Hungary) Dunaferr (Israel) Hapoel Tel Aviv	(Georgia (country)) Torpedo Kutaisi (Iceland) KR (Finland) Haka (Belarus) BATE Borisov (Republic of Ireland) Shelbourne (Lithuania) Kaunas (Estonia) Levadia Maardu

Notes

1. ^{†} Winners of the previous qualifying round whose identity was not known at the time of the draw. Teams in italics defeated a team with a higher coefficient in the previous qualifying round, thus effectively taking the coefficient of their defeated opponent in the draw for this round.

=== Summary ===
Team 1	Agg.	Team 2	1st leg	2nd leg
Anderlecht (Belgium)	4–2	(Cyprus) Anorthosis Famagusta	4–2	0–0
Beşiktaş (Turkey)	2–1	(Bulgaria) Levski Sofia	1–0	1–1
Brøndby (Denmark)	3–1	(Iceland) KR	3–1	0–0
Dinamo București (Romania)	4–7	(Poland) Polonia Warsaw	3–4	1–3
Rangers (Scotland)	4–1	(Lithuania) Kaunas	4–1	0–0
Haka (Finland)	0–1	(Slovakia) Inter Slovnaft Bratislava	0–0	0–1 (a.e.t.)
Helsingborgs IF (Sweden)	3–0	(Belarus) BATE Borisov	0–0	3–0
Red Star Belgrade (Federal Republic of Yugoslavia)	4–2	(Georgia (country)) Torpedo Kutaisi	4–0	0–2
Shakhtar Donetsk (Ukraine)	9–2	(Estonia) Levadia Maardu	4–1	5–1
Slavia Prague (Czech Republic)	5–1	(Azerbaijan) Shamkir	1–0	4–1
Shelbourne (Republic of Ireland)	2–4	(Norway) Rosenborg	1–3	1–1
Sturm Graz (Austria)	5–1	(Israel) Hapoel Tel Aviv	3–0	2–1
Zimbru Chișinău (Moldova)	2–1	(Slovenia) Maribor	2–0	0–1
Hajduk Split (Croatia)	2–4	(Hungary) Dunaferr	0–2	2–2

=== Matches ===
26 July 2000
20:00

Anderlecht (Belgium)	4–2	(Cyprus) Anorthosis Famagusta
Baseggio 4'; Koller 15', 28', 59'	Report	Pavlovic 10'; Papavasiliou 90'

Constant Vanden Stock Stadium, Brussels
Attendance: 21,746
Referee: Knud Stadsgaard (Denmark)
2 August 2000
19:00

Anorthosis Famagusta (Cyprus)	0–0	(Belgium) Anderlecht
	Report

GSP Stadium, Nicosia (Note: Anorthosis Famagusta played their home match at GSP Stadium in Nicosia, instead of their regular venue Antonis Papadopoulos Stadium in Larnaca.)
Attendance: 5,652
Referee: Hermann Albrecht (Germany)

Anderlecht won 4–2 on aggregate.

26 July 2000
19:45

Beşiktaş (Turkey)	1–0	(Bulgaria) Levski Sofia
Nouma 81'	Report

BJK İnönü Stadium, Istanbul
Attendance: 20,800
Referee: Fiorenzo Treossi (Italy)
2 August 2000
19:30

Levski Sofia (Bulgaria)	1–1	(Turkey) Beşiktaş
Markov 64'	Report	Tayfur 35'

Georgi Asparuhov Stadium, Sofia
Attendance: 20,865
Referee: Martin Hansson (Sweden)

Beşiktaş won 2–1 on aggregate.

26 July 2000
18:30

Brøndby (Denmark)	3–1	(Iceland) KR
Bagger 14'; Lindrup 50'; Madsen 84'	Report	Daníelsson 18'

Brøndby Stadium, Brøndbyvester
Attendance: 8,567
Referee: John McDermott (Republic of Ireland)
2 August 2000
20:30

KR (Iceland)	0–0	(Denmark) Brøndby
	Report

Laugardalsvöllur, Reykjavík (Note: KR played their Second qualifying round home match at Laugardalsvöllur in Reykjavík, instead of their regular venue KR-völlur in Reykjavík.)
Attendance: 3,077
Referee: Dejan Delević (FR Yugoslavia)

Brøndby won 3–1 on aggregate.

26 July 2000
20:00

Dinamo București (Romania)	3–4	(Poland) Polonia Warsaw
Lupu 7'; Mihalcea 45'; Niculae 63'	Report	Wieszczycki 23', 58'; Olisadebe 35'; Gołaszewski 88'

Stadionul Național, Bucharest
Attendance: 18,500
Referee: José Victor Esquinas Torres (Spain)
2 August 2000
20:00

Polonia Warsaw (Poland)	3–1	(Romania) Dinamo București
Olisadebe 59', 61'; Gołaszewski 65'	Report	Tameș 43'

Stadion Wisły, Płock (Note: Polonia Warsaw played their home matches at Stadion Wisły in Płock, instead of their regular venue Stadion Polonii Warszawa in Warsaw.)
Attendance: 3,560
Referee: Jorge Monteiro Coroado (Portugal)

Polonia Warsaw won 7–4 on aggregate.

26 July 2000
20:45

Rangers (Scotland)	4–1	(Lithuania) Kaunas
Johnston 15'; Albertz 62'; Dodds 90', 90+4'	Report	Žuta 27'

Ibrox Stadium, Glasgow
Attendance: 45,974
Referee: Emanuel Zammit (Malta)
2 August 2000
16:30

Kaunas (Lithuania)	0–0	(Scotland) Rangers
	Report

Darius and Girėnas Stadium, Kaunas
Attendance: 4,000
Referee: Frank De Bleeckere (Belgium)

Rangers won 4–1 on aggregate.

26 July 2000
18:00

Haka (Finland)	0–0	(Slovakia) Inter Slovnaft Bratislava
	Report

Tehtaan kenttä, Valkeakoski
Attendance: 1,785
Referee: Laurent Duhamel (France)
2 August 2000
20:00

Inter Slovnaft Bratislava (Slovakia)	1–0 (a.e.t.)	(Finland) Haka
Németh 108'	Report

Štadión Pasienky, Bratislava
Attendance: 2,570
Referee: Helmut Fleischer (Germany)

Inter Slovnaft Bratislava won 1–0 on aggregate.

26 July 2000
19:00

Helsingborgs IF (Sweden)	0–0	(Belarus) BATE Borisov
	Report

Olympia, Helsingborg
Attendance: 4,417
Referee: Igor Ishchenko (Ukraine)
2 August 2000
19:00

BATE Borisov (Belarus)	0–3	(Sweden) Helsingborgs IF
	Report	Álvaro 11'; C. Andersson 24'; Wahlstedt 85'

Dinamo Stadium, Minsk (Note: BATE Borisov played their Second qualifying round home match at Dinamo Stadium in Minsk, as their regular venue City Stadium in Borisov did not meet UEFA criteria.)
Attendance: 7,540
Referee: Meir Levi (Israel)

Helsingborgs IF won 3–0 on aggregate.

26 July 2000
20:00

Red Star Belgrade (Federal Republic of Yugoslavia)	4–0	(Georgia (country)) Torpedo Kutaisi
Drulić 24', 90'; Bošković 37'; Pjanović 39'	Report

Red Star Stadium, Belgrade
Attendance: 14,636
Referee: Dietmar Drabek (Austria)
2 August 2000
17:00

Torpedo Kutaisi (Georgia (country))	2–0	(Federal Republic of Yugoslavia) Red Star Belgrade
Imedadze 41'; Janashia 90+2'	Report

Givi Kiladze Stadium, Kutaisi
Attendance: 3,200
Referee: Uriah Rennie (England)

Red Star Belgrade won 4–2 on aggregate.

26 July 2000
17:00

Shakhtar Donetsk (Ukraine)	4–1	(Estonia) Levadia Maardu
Atellkin 4', 16', 57'; Byelik 71'	Report	Rõtškov 80'

Shakhtar Stadium, Donetsk
Attendance: 30,000
Referee: Milan Mitrović (Slovenia)
2 August 2000
17:00

Levadia Maardu (Estonia)	1–5	(Ukraine) Shakhtar Donetsk
Bragin 48'	Report	Vorobey 26', 31', 79'; Atelkin 90+1'; Zubov 90+3'

Kadriorg Stadium, Tallinn
Attendance: 1,500
Referee: Martin Ingvarsson (Sweden)

Shakhtar Donetsk won 9–2 on aggregate.

26 July 2000
18:00

Slavia Prague (Czech Republic)	1–0	(Azerbaijan) Shamkir
Zelenka 38'	Report

Stadion Evžena Rošického, Prague
Attendance: 2,819
Referee: Emil Bozinovski (Macedonia)
2 August 2000
15:30

Shamkir (Azerbaijan)	1–4	(Czech Republic) Slavia Prague
Kvaratskhelia 49'	Report	Dostálek 38'; T. Došek 57', 60'; Švancara 69'

Tofiq Bahramov Republican Stadium, Baku
Attendance: 12,000
Referee: Roy Helge Olsen (Norway)

Slavia Prague won 5–1 on aggregate.

26 July 2000
21:00

Shelbourne (Republic of Ireland)	1–3	(Norway) Rosenborg
Foran 61'	Report	Berg 2'; Winsnes 14'; Belsvik 90'

Tolka Park, Dublin
Attendance: 8,642
Referee: Ivan Dobrinov (Bulgaria)
2 August 2000
20:45

Rosenborg (Norway)	1–1	(Republic of Ireland) Shelbourne
Berg 80'	Report	Foran 64'

Lerkendal Stadion, Trondheim
Attendance: 5,470
Referee: Massimo Busacca (Switzerland)

Rosenborg won 4–2 on aggregate.

26 July 2000
20:30

Sturm Graz (Austria)	3–0	(Israel) Hapoel Tel Aviv
Vastić 14'; Reinmayr 74'; Neukirchner 90'	Report

Arnold Schwarzenegger-Stadion, Graz
Attendance: 10,298
Referee: Metin Tokat (Turkey)
2 August 2000
19:00

Hapoel Tel Aviv (Israel)	1–2	(Austria) Sturm Graz
Balili 80'	Report	Korsós 71'; Kocijan 85'

Bloomfield Stadium, Tel Aviv
Attendance: 5,000
Referee: Sorin Carpodean (Romania)

Sturm Graz won 5–1 on aggregate.

26 July 2000
17:00

Zimbru Chișinău (Moldova)	2–0	(Slovenia) Maribor
Kulik 48' (pen.); Epureanu 66'	Report

Stadionul Moldova, Speia
Attendance: 3,000
Referee: Alan Snoddy (Northern Ireland)
2 August 2000
20:15

Maribor (Slovenia)	1–0	(Moldova) Zimbru Chișinău
Čeh 3'	Report

Ljudski vrt, Maribor
Attendance: 6,000
Referee: Mikko Vuorela (Finland)

Zimbru Chișinău won 2–1 on aggregate.

26 July 2000
20:15

Hajduk Split (Croatia)	0–2	(Hungary) Dunaferr
	Report	Tököli 57'; Éger 90'

Stadion Poljud, Split
Attendance: 16,000
Referee: Cosimo Bolognino (Italy)
2 August 2000
20:45

Dunaferr (Hungary)	2–2	(Croatia) Hajduk Split
Zavadszky 20'; Tököli 87'	Report	Bilić 9', 28'

Stadion ETO, Győr (Note: Dunaferr played their home matches at Stadion ETO in Győr, as their regular venue Dunaferr Aréna in Dunaújváros was closed for renovation.)
Attendance: 10,750
Referee: Dermot Gallagher (England)

Dunaferr won 4–2 on aggregate.

== Third qualifying round ==
The draw for this round was performed on 21 July 2000 in Nyon, Switzerland.

=== Seeding ===
Seeded		Unseeded	
(Italy) Internazionale (Spain) Valencia (Portugal) Porto (France) Lyon (Netherlands) Feyenoord (Czech Republic) Slavia Prague (Italy) Milan (Turkey) Galatasaray	(Ukraine) Dynamo Kyiv (Norway) Rosenborg (Russia) Lokomotiv Moscow (Greece) Panathinaikos (England) Leeds United (Czech Republic) Sparta Prague (Denmark) Brøndby (Scotland) Rangers	(Germany) Hamburger SV (Germany) 1860 Munich (Belgium) Anderlecht (Turkey) Beşiktaş (Austria) Sturm Graz (Croatia) Dinamo Zagreb (Sweden) Helsingborgs IF (Ukraine) Shakhtar Donetsk	(Federal Republic of Yugoslavia) Red Star Belgrade (Austria) Tirol Innsbruck (Poland) Polonia Warsaw (Moldova) Zimbru Chișinău (Switzerland) St. Gallen (Slovakia) Inter Slovnaft Bratislava (Hungary) Dunaferr (Denmark) Herfølge

Notes

1. ^{†} Winners of the previous qualifying round whose identity was not known at the time of the draw. Teams in italics defeated a team with a higher coefficient in the previous qualifying round, thus effectively taking the coefficient of their defeated opponent in the draw for this round.

=== Summary ===
The losing teams advanced to the first round of the 2000–01 UEFA Cup.

Team 1	Agg.	Team 2	1st leg	2nd leg
Tirol Innsbruck (Austria)	1–4	(Spain) Valencia	0–0	1–4
Zimbru Chișinău (Moldova)	0–2	(Czech Republic) Sparta Prague	0–1	0–1
Brøndby (Denmark)	0–2	(Germany) Hamburger SV	0–2	0–0
Helsingborgs IF (Sweden)	1–0	(Italy) Internazionale	1–0	0–0
Beşiktaş (Turkey)	6–1	(Russia) Lokomotiv Moscow	3–0	3–1
Inter Slovnaft Bratislava (Slovakia)	2–4	(France) Lyon	1–2	1–2
Anderlecht (Belgium)	1–0	(Portugal) Porto	1–0	0–0
Herfølge (Denmark)	0–6	(Scotland) Rangers	0–3	0–3
Dynamo Kyiv (Ukraine)	1–1 (a)	(Federal Republic of Yugoslavia) Red Star Belgrade	0–0	1–1
Polonia Warsaw (Poland)	3–4	(Greece) Panathinaikos	2–2	1–2
Leeds United (England)	3–1	(Germany) 1860 Munich	2–1	1–0
Sturm Graz (Austria)	3–2	(Netherlands) Feyenoord	2–1	1–1
Dunaferr (Hungary)	3–4	(Norway) Rosenborg	2–2	1–2
St. Gallen (Switzerland)	3–4	(Turkey) Galatasaray	1–2	2–2
Milan (Italy)	6–1	(Croatia) Dinamo Zagreb	3–1	3–0
Shakhtar Donetsk (Ukraine)	2–1	(Czech Republic) Slavia Prague	0–1	2–0 (a.e.t.)

=== Matches ===
9 August 2000
20:30

Tirol Innsbruck (Austria)	0–0	(Spain) Valencia
	Report

Tivoli, Innsbruck
Attendance: 6,615
Referee: Mike Riley (England)
23 August 2000
22:00

Valencia (Spain)	4–1	(Austria) Tirol Innsbruck
Mendieta 23' (pen.), 52'; Diego Alonso 44', 62'	Report	Gilewicz 66'

Mestalla, Valencia
Attendance: 43,700
Referee: Domenico Messina (Italy)

Valencia won 4–1 on aggregate.

8 August 2000
16:30

Zimbru Chișinău (Moldova)	0–1	(Czech Republic) Sparta Prague
	Report	Obajdin 61'

Stadionul Moldova, Speia
Attendance: 3,300
Referee: Jacek Granat (Poland)
23 August 2000
18:00

Sparta Prague (Czech Republic)	1–0	(Moldova) Zimbru Chișinău
Obajdin 57'	Report

Stadion Letná, Prague
Attendance: 8,588
Referee: Vasyl Melnychuk (Ukraine)

Sparta Prague won 2–0 on aggregate.

8 August 2000
19:00

Brøndby (Denmark)	0–2	(Germany) Hamburger SV
	Report	Barbarez 83'; Mahdavikia 85'

Brøndby Stadium, Brøndbyvester
Attendance: 11,682
Referee: Mike McCurry (Scotland)
22 August 2000
20:30

Hamburger SV (Germany)	0–0	(Denmark) Brøndby
	Report

Volksparkstadion, Hamburg
Attendance: 44,351
Referee: Željko Širić (Croatia)

Hamburger SV won 2–0 on aggregate.

9 August 2000
20:45

Helsingborgs IF (Sweden)	1–0	(Italy) Internazionale
Hansson 81'	Report

Olympia, Helsingborg
Attendance: 12,000
Referee: Zoran Arsić (FR Yugoslavia)
23 August 2000
21:00

Internazionale (Italy)	0–0	(Sweden) Helsingborgs IF
	Report

San Siro, Milan
Attendance: 49,949
Referee: Vladimír Hriňák (Slovakia)

Helsingborgs IF won 1–0 on aggregate.

8 August 2000
20:45

Beşiktaş (Turkey)	3–0	(Russia) Lokomotiv Moscow
Nihat Kahveci 10'; Nouma 80'; Karhan 90'	Report

BJK İnönü Stadium, Istanbul
Attendance: 14,000
Referee: Alfredo Trentalange (Italy)
23 August 2000
18:00

Lokomotiv Moscow (Russia)	1–3	(Turkey) Beşiktaş
Cherevchenko 50'	Report	Nouma 28'; Nihat Kahveci 73'; Tayfur 87'

Luzhniki Stadium, Moscow (Note: Lokomotiv Moscow played their home match at Luzhniki Stadium, as their regular home venue Lokomotiv Stadium in Moscow was closed for renovation.)
Attendance: 10,200
Referee: Lutz Michael Fröhlich (Germany)

Beşiktaş won 6–1 on aggregate.

7 August 2000
18:00

Inter Slovnaft Bratislava (Slovakia)	1–2	(France) Lyon
Németh 75'	Report	Anderson 50'; Delmotte 90'

Štadión Pasienky, Bratislava
Attendance: 3,540
Referee: Tomasz Mikulski (Poland)
23 August 2000
20:00

Lyon (France)	2–1	(Slovakia) Inter Slovnaft Bratislava
Marlet 55'; Malbranque 89'	Report	Pinte 36'

Stade de Gerland, Lyon
Attendance: 20,318
Referee: Roelof Luinge (Netherlands)

Lyon won 4–2 on aggregate.

9 August 2000
20:00

Anderlecht (Belgium)	1–0	(Portugal) Porto
Koller 38'	Report

Constant Vanden Stock Stadium, Brussels
Attendance: 14,263
Referee: Tom Henning Øvrebø (Norway)
23 August 2000
22:00

Porto (Portugal)	0–0	(Belgium) Anderlecht
	Report

Estádio das Antas, Porto
Attendance: 24,087
Referee: Cosimo Bolognino (Italy)

Anderlecht won 1–0 on aggregate.

9 August 2000
20:05

Herfølge (Denmark)	0–3	(Scotland) Rangers
	Report	Albertz 27'; Wallace 31'; Amoruso 60'

Herfølge Stadium, Herfølge
Attendance: 3,523
Referee: Lubomír Puček (Czech Republic)
23 August 2000
20:45

Rangers (Scotland)	3–0	(Denmark) Herfølge
Wallace 47'; Johnston 74'; Kanchelskis 90'	Report

Ibrox Stadium, Glasgow
Attendance: 34,141
Referee: Dani Koren (Israel)

Rangers won 6–0 on aggregate.

9 August 2000
18:00

Dynamo Kyiv (Ukraine)	0–0	(Federal Republic of Yugoslavia) Red Star Belgrade
	Report

Dynamo Stadium, Kyiv
Attendance: 17,000
Referee: Dermot Gallagher (England)
23 August 2000
20:15

Red Star Belgrade (Federal Republic of Yugoslavia)	1–1	(Ukraine) Dynamo Kyiv
Bošković 22'	Report	Byalkevich 33'

Red Star Stadium, Belgrade
Attendance: 52,000
Referee: Kyros Vassaras (Greece)

1–1 on aggregate; Dynamo Kyiv won on away goals.

9 August 2000
20:00

Polonia Warsaw (Poland)	2–2	(Greece) Panathinaikos
Kiełbowicz 45'; Kaliszan 68'	Report	Warzycha 11'; Fyssas 37'

Stadion Wisły, Płock
Attendance: 7,700
Referee: Paulo Paraty (Portugal)
23 August 2000
20:00

Panathinaikos (Greece)	2–1	(Poland) Polonia Warsaw
Liberopoulos 30'; Pfipsen 61' (pen.)	Report	Bąk 86'

Olympic Stadium, Athens
Attendance: 41,156
Referee: Edgar Steinborn (Germany)

Panathinaikos won 4–3 on aggregate.

9 August 2000
20:45

Leeds United (England)	2–1	(Germany) 1860 Munich
Smith 39'; Harte 71'	Report	Agostino 90'

Elland Road, Leeds
Attendance: 33,769
Referee: Costas Kapitanis (Cyprus)
23 August 2000
20:45

1860 Munich (Germany)	0–1	(England) Leeds United
	Report	Smith 46'

Olympiastadion, Munich
Attendance: 56,000
Referee: Claus Bo Larsen (Denmark)

Leeds United won 3–1 on aggregate.

8 August 2000
20:30

Sturm Graz (Austria)	2–1	(Netherlands) Feyenoord
Schopp 23' (pen.), 90' (pen.)	Report	Korneev 7'

Arnold Schwarzenegger-Stadion, Graz
Attendance: 15,100
Referee: Terje Hauge (Norway)
23 August 2000
20:00

Feyenoord (Netherlands)	1–1	(Austria) Sturm Graz
Jochemsen 87'	Report	Reinmayr 54'

De Kuip, Rotterdam
Attendance: 34,000
Referee: Victor Esquinas Torres (Spain)

Sturm Graz won 3–2 on aggregate.

9 August 2000
20:45

Dunaferr (Hungary)	2–2	(Norway) Rosenborg
Lengyel 80'; Tököli 87'	Report	Strand 51'; Knutsen 86'

Stadion ETO, Győr
Attendance: 14,000
Referee: Atanas Uzunov (Bulgaria)
23 August 2000
20:45

Rosenborg (Norway)	2–1	(Hungary) Dunaferr
Berg 4'; Belsvik 48'	Report	Tököli 17'

Lerkendal Stadion, Trondheim
Attendance: 9,424
Referee: Miroslav Liba (Czech Republic)

Rosenborg won 4–3 on aggregate.

9 August 2000
20:15

St. Gallen (Switzerland)	1–2	(Turkey) Galatasaray
Amoah 14'	Report	Jardel 39', 78'

Hardturm, Zürich (Note: St. Gallen played their home match at Hardturm stadium in Zürich, instead of their regular venue Espenmoos stadium in St. Gallen.)
Attendance: 16,066
Referee: Manuel Mejuto González (Spain)
22 August 2000
20:45

Galatasaray (Turkey)	2–2	(Switzerland) St. Gallen
Zellweger 22' (o.g.); Jardel 28' (pen.)	Report	Gane 30'; Amoah 85'

Ali Sami Yen Stadium, Istanbul
Attendance: 16,337
Referee: Knud Erik Fisker (Denmark)

Galatasaray won 4–3 on aggregate.

9 August 2000
20:45

Milan (Italy)	3–1	(Croatia) Dinamo Zagreb
Shevchenko 21', 59'; Comandini 90'	Report	Pilipović 19'

San Siro, Milan
Attendance: 37,323
Referee: Alain Hamer (Luxembourg)
22 August 2000
20:30

Dinamo Zagreb (Croatia)	0–3	(Italy) Milan
	Report	Shevchenko 23', 42'; José Mari 55'

Stadion Maksimir, Zagreb
Attendance: 26,500
Referee: Juan Ansuátegui Roca (Spain)

Milan won 6–1 on aggregate.

9 August 2000
18:00

Shakhtar Donetsk (Ukraine)	0–1	(Czech Republic) Slavia Prague
	Report	Ulich 89'

Shakhtar Stadium, Donetsk
Attendance: 31,547
Referee: Pascal Garibian (France)
22 August 2000
18:00

Slavia Prague (Czech Republic)	0–2 (a.e.t.)	(Ukraine) Shakhtar Donetsk
	Report	Vorobey 90'; Atelkin 97'

Stadion Evžena Rošického, Prague
Attendance: 8,578
Referee: Leslie Irvine (Northern Ireland)

Shakhtar Donetsk won 2–1 on aggregate.
