= 2001 UEFA Champions League final =

Association football match

- Match programme cover
- Event: 2000–01 UEFA Champions League
Bayern Munich	Valencia
(Germany)	(Spain)
1	1
- After golden goal extra time Bayern Munich won 5–4 on penalties
- Date: 23 May 2001
- Venue: San Siro, Milan
- Man of the Match: Oliver Kahn (Bayern Munich)
- Referee: Dick Jol (Netherlands)
- Attendance: 79,000
- Weather: Mostly cloudy 22 °C (72 °F); 64% humidity

The 2001 UEFA Champions League final was a football match that took place at San Siro in Milan, Italy, on 23 May 2001, to decide the winner of the 2000–01 UEFA Champions League. The match pitted German side Bayern Munich against Spanish side Valencia. The match finished in a 1–1 draw, but Bayern clinched their fourth title by winning 5–4 on penalties. This was also their first European Cup title in a quarter-century, while it was Valencia's second consecutive defeat in the only finals they had reached in the competition. Both goals scored in the match were from penalties, with Bayern Munich also missing a penalty in normal time, and a penalty shoot-out was required to decide the winner, with the match being referred to as an "all-penalty" final. The 2001 event was a meeting of the two previous seasons' losing finalists – Bayern Munich lost to Manchester United in 1999 and Valencia lost to Real Madrid in 2000.

This was the sixth European Cup final to be decided on penalties, and the second under the Champions League format. This was Ottmar Hitzfeld's second Champions League title after he won it with Borussia Dortmund in 1997, making him the second coach in European Cup history, after Ernst Happel, to win the competition with two clubs. Meanwhile, it was Héctor Cúper's third consecutive European final defeat; he lost the 1999 UEFA Cup Winners' Cup final with Mallorca before losing the 2000 Champions League final with Valencia.

== Teams ==
In the following table, finals until 1992 were in the European Cup era, since 1993 were in the UEFA Champions League era.

Team	Previous final appearances (bold indicates winners)
(Germany) Bayern Munich	6 (**1974**, **1975**, **1976**, 1982, 1987, 1999)
(Spain) Valencia	1 (2000)

== Route to the final ==
(Germany) Bayern Munich				Round	(Spain) Valencia			
Opponent	Agg.	1st leg	2nd leg	Qualifying phase	Opponent	Agg.	1st leg	2nd leg
Bye				Third qualifying round	(Austria) Tirol Innsbruck	4–1	0–0 (A)	4–1 (H)
Opponent	Result			First group stage	Opponent	Result		
(Sweden) Helsingborgs IF	3–1 (A)			Matchday 1	(Greece) Olympiacos	2–1 (H)		
(Norway) Rosenborg	3–1 (H)			Matchday 2	(Netherlands) Heerenveen	1–0 (A)		
(France) Paris Saint-Germain	0–1 (A)			Matchday 3	(France) Lyon	1–0 (H)		
(France) Paris Saint-Germain	2–0 (H)			Matchday 4	(France) Lyon	2–1 (A)		
(Sweden) Helsingborgs IF	0–0 (H)			Matchday 5	(Greece) Olympiacos	0–1 (A)		
(Norway) Rosenborg	1–1 (A)			Matchday 6	(Netherlands) Heerenveen	1–1 (H)		
**Group F winners**: Pos / Team / Pld / Pts; **1** / (Germany) Bayern Munich / **6** / **11**; 2 / (France) Paris Saint-Germain / 6 / **10**; 3 / (Norway) Rosenborg / 6 / **7**; 4 / (Sweden) Helsingborgs IF / 6 / **5**; Source: UEFA				Final standings	**Group C winners**: Pos / Team / Pld / Pts; **1** / (Spain) Valencia / **6** / **13**; 2 / (France) Lyon / 6 / **9**; 3 / (Greece) Olympiacos / 6 / **9**; 4 / (Netherlands) Heerenveen / 6 / **4**; Source: UEFA			
Opponent	Result			Second group stage	Opponent	Result		
(France) Lyon	1–0 (H)			Matchday 1	(Austria) Sturm Graz	2–0 (H)		
(England) Arsenal	2–2 (A)			Matchday 2	(Greece) Panathinaikos	0–0 (A)		
(Russia) Spartak Moscow	1–0 (H)			Matchday 3	(England) Manchester United	0–0 (H)		
(Russia) Spartak Moscow	3–0 (A)			Matchday 4	(England) Manchester United	1–1 (A)		
(France) Lyon	0–3 (A)			Matchday 5	(Austria) Sturm Graz	5–0 (A)		
(England) Arsenal	1–0 (H)			Matchday 6	(Greece) Panathinaikos	2–1 (H)		
**Group C winners**: Pos / Team / Pld / Pts; **1** / (Germany) Bayern Munich / **6** / **13**; 2 / (England) Arsenal / 6 / **8**; 3 / (France) Lyon / 6 / **8**; 4 / (Russia) Spartak Moscow / 6 / **4**; Source: UEFA				Final standings	**Group A winners**: Pos / Team / Pld / Pts; **1** / (Spain) Valencia / **6** / **12**; 2 / (England) Manchester United / 6 / **12**; 3 / (Austria) Sturm Graz / 6 / **6**; 4 / (Greece) Panathinaikos / 6 / **2**; Source: UEFA			
Opponent	Agg.	1st leg	2nd leg	Knockout phase	Opponent	Agg.	1st leg	2nd leg
(England) Manchester United	3–1	1–0 (A)	2–1 (H)	Quarter-finals	(England) Arsenal	2–2 (a)	1–2 (A)	1–0 (H)
(Spain) Real Madrid	3–1	1–0 (A)	2–1 (H)	Semi-finals	(England) Leeds United	3–0	0–0 (A)	3–0 (H)

== Match ==
=== Summary ===
This final would come to be known for the goalkeeping heroics of Bayern keeper Oliver Kahn.

Valencia opened the score early on with a Gaizka Mendieta penalty in the third minute after a prostrate Patrik Andersson was deemed to have handled the ball in the penalty area. Only a few minutes later, Bayern Munich were awarded a penalty after Jocelyn Angloma fouled Stefan Effenberg in the penalty box, but Santiago Cañizares saved Mehmet Scholl's kick with his legs. Bayern were awarded another penalty early in the second half, this time after Amedeo Carboni handled the ball while competing for a header with Carsten Jancker. This time, Effenberg took the penalty kick and sent Cañizares the wrong way to level the scores at 1–1. The scores remained level for the remainder of regulalation time and throughout the 30 minutes of extra time, thus sending the match to penalties.

Again, Valencia took the lead early on as Paulo Sérgio put the first kick of the shoot-out over the bar before Mendieta sent Oliver Kahn the wrong way. Hasan Salihamidžić, John Carew and Alexander Zickler then traded penalty goals before Kahn saved Zlatko Zahovič's kick to tie the scores at 2–2 after three kicks each. The next kick from Andersson was also saved by Cañizares, and then Kahn stretched out his hand to tip Carboni's shot onto the crossbar. Both Rubén Baraja and Effenberg then scored to take the shoot-out to sudden death. Bixente Lizarazu and Kily González both scored their clubs' sixth kicks and then Thomas Linke scored for Bayern to set Mauricio Pellegrino up for the game-deciding kick. Kahn guessed the right direction and saved, winning Bayern the trophy. He also won the UEFA Fair Play Award for consoling his heartbroken rival Cañizares after the penalty shoot-out.

This match along with the 2001 UEFA Cup final that Alaves lost to Liverpool one week earlier, was the last time a Spanish club lost a UEFA final against a team from another country until 2025 UEFA Conference League final, when Real Betis lost to Chelsea.

=== Details ===
23 May 2001
20:45 UTC+2

Bayern Munich (Germany)	1–1 (a.e.t.)	(Spain) Valencia
Effenberg 50' (pen.)	Report	Mendieta 3' (pen.)
Penalties
Paulo Sérgio (penalty missed); Salihamidžić (penalty scored); Zickler (penalty scored); Andersson (penalty missed); Effenberg (penalty scored); Lizarazu (penalty scored); Linke (penalty scored)	5–4	(penalty scored) Mendieta; (penalty scored) Carew; (penalty missed) Zahovič; (penalty missed) Carboni; (penalty scored) Baraja; (penalty scored) Kily; (penalty missed) Pellegrino

San Siro, Milan
Attendance: 79,000
Referee: Dick Jol (Netherlands)

**Bayern Munich**	**Valencia**

GK	1	(Germany) Oliver Kahn
CB	4	(Ghana) Samuel Kuffour
CB	5	(Sweden) Patrik Andersson	(yellow card) 38'
CB	25	(Germany) Thomas Linke
DM	23	(England) Owen Hargreaves
RM	2	(France) Willy Sagnol		(substituted off) 46'
CM	7	(Germany) Mehmet Scholl		(substituted off) 108'
CM	11	(Germany) Stefan Effenberg (c)
LM	3	(France) Bixente Lizarazu
SS	20	(Bosnia and Herzegovina) Hasan Salihamidžić
CF	9	(Brazil) Giovane Élber		(substituted off) 100'
Substitutes:
GK	22	(Germany) Bernd Dreher
DF	18	(Germany) Michael Tarnat
MF	10	(Switzerland) Ciriaco Sforza
FW	13	(Brazil) Paulo Sérgio		(substituted on) 108'
FW	19	(Germany) Carsten Jancker		(substituted on) 46'
FW	21	(Germany) Alexander Zickler		(substituted on) 100'
FW	24	(Paraguay) Roque Santa Cruz
Manager:
(Germany) Ottmar Hitzfeld

GK	1	(Spain) Santiago Cañizares	(yellow card) 120'
RB	20	(France) Jocelyn Angloma
CB	12	(Argentina) Roberto Ayala		(substituted off) 90'
CB	2	(Argentina) Mauricio Pellegrino
LB	15	(Italy) Amedeo Carboni	(yellow card) 26'
CM	6	(Spain) Gaizka Mendieta (c)
CM	19	(Spain) Rubén Baraja
CM	18	(Argentina) Kily González	(yellow card) 117'
AM	35	(Argentina) Pablo Aimar		(substituted off) 46'
CF	17	(Spain) Juan Ginés Sánchez		(substituted off) 66'
CF	7	(Norway) John Carew
Substitutes:
GK	25	(Spain) Andrés Palop
DF	5	(Federal Republic of Yugoslavia) Miroslav Đukić		(substituted on) 90'
DF	34	(Brazil) Fábio Aurélio
MF	4	(France) Didier Deschamps
MF	8	(Slovenia) Zlatko Zahovič		(substituted on) 66'
MF	23	(Spain) David Albelda		(substituted on) 46'
FW	14	(Spain) Vicente
Manager:
(Argentina) Héctor Cúper

Man of the Match:
Oliver Kahn (Bayern Munich)

Assistant referees:
Jaap Pool (Netherlands)
Jan-Willem van Veluwen (Netherlands)
Fourth official:
Jan Wegereef (Netherlands)

**Match rules**

- 90 minutes.
- 30 minutes of golden goal extra time if necessary.
- Penalty shoot-out if no goals occur in extra time.
- Seven named substitutes.
- Maximum of three substitutes.

=== Statistics ===
	Bayern Munich	Valencia
Goals scored	1	1
Total shots	19	9
Shots on target	5	4
Ball possession	64%	36%
Corner kicks	10	3
Fouls committed	24	23
Offsides	2	6
Yellow cards	1	3
Red cards	0	0

== See also ==
- 2001 UEFA Cup final
- 2001 UEFA Super Cup
- 2001 Intercontinental Cup
- 2000–01 FC Bayern Munich season
- 2000–01 Valencia CF season
- FC Bayern Munich in international football competitions
- Valencia CF in European football
