= Deportivo de A Coruña in European football =

Spanish club in European football

- Club: Deportivo de A Coruña
- Seasons played: 12
- First entry: 1993–94 UEFA Cup
- Latest entry: 2008–09 UEFA Cup

This is an article showing the matches of Deportivo de A Coruña in European competitions.

== Overall record ==
Accurate as of 8 August 2017

Competition	Pld	W	D	L	GF	GA	GD	Win%
UEFA Champions League	62	25	17	20	78	79	−1	40.32
UEFA Cup Winners' Cup	8	4	2	2	14	3	+11	50.00
UEFA Cup / UEFA Europa League	32	14	5	13	43	36	+7	43.75
UEFA Intertoto Cup	10	8	0	2	18	10	+8	80.00
Total	112	51	24	37	153	128	+25	45.54

Source: UEFA.com
Pld = Matches played; W = Matches won; D = Matches drawn; L = Matches lost; GF = Goals for; GA = Goals against; GD = Goal Difference.

== Results ==
Season	Competition	Round	Opponent	Home	Away	Aggregate
1993–94	UEFA Cup	First round	(Denmark) AaB	5–0	0–1	5–1
1993–94	UEFA Cup	Second round	(England) Aston Villa	1–1	1–0	2–1
1993–94	UEFA Cup	Third round	(Germany) Eintracht Frankfurt	0–1	0–1	0–2
1994–95	UEFA Cup	First round	(Norway) Rosenborg	4–1 (a.e.t.)	0–1	4–2
1994–95	UEFA Cup	Second round	(Austria) Tirol Innsbruck	4–0	0–2	4–2
1994–95	UEFA Cup	Third round	(Germany) Borussia Dortmund	1–0	1–3 (a.e.t.)	2–3
1995–96	UEFA Cup Winners' Cup	First round	(Cyprus) APOEL	8–0	0–0	8–0
1995–96	UEFA Cup Winners' Cup	Second round	(Turkey) Trabzonspor	3–0	1–0	4–0
1995–96	UEFA Cup Winners' Cup	Quarter-finals	(Spain) Zaragoza	1–0	1–1	2–1
1995–96	UEFA Cup Winners' Cup	Semi-finals	(France) Paris Saint-Germain	0–1	0–1	0–2
1997–98	UEFA Cup	First round	(France) Auxerre	1–2	0–0	1–2
1999–2000	UEFA Cup	First round	(Norway) Stabæk	2–0	0–1	2–1
1999–2000	UEFA Cup	Second round	(France) Montpellier	3–1	2–0	5–1
1999–2000	UEFA Cup	Third round	(Greece) Panathinaikos	4–2	1–1	5–3
1999–2000	UEFA Cup	Fourth round	(England) Arsenal	2–1	1–5	3–6
2000–01	UEFA Champions League	Group stage	(Greece) Panathinaikos	1–0	1–1	1st
2000–01	UEFA Champions League	Group stage	(Germany) Hamburger SV	2–1	1–1	1st
2000–01	UEFA Champions League	Group stage	(Italy) Juventus	1–1	0–0	1st
2000–01	UEFA Champions League	Second group stage	(France) Paris Saint-Germain	4–3	3–1	1st
2000–01	UEFA Champions League	Second group stage	(Italy) Milan	0–1	1–1	1st
2000–01	UEFA Champions League	Second group stage	(Turkey) Galatasaray	2–0	0–1	1st
2000–01	UEFA Champions League	Quarter-finals	(England) Leeds United	2–0	0–3	2–3
2001–02	UEFA Champions League	Group stage	(Greece) Olympiacos	2–2	1–1	1st
2001–02	UEFA Champions League	Group stage	(England) Manchester United	2–1	3–2	1st
2001–02	UEFA Champions League	Group stage	(France) Lille	1–1	1–1	1st
2001–02	UEFA Champions League	Second group stage	(England) Arsenal	2–0	2–0	2nd
2001–02	UEFA Champions League	Second group stage	(Germany) Bayer Leverkusen	1–3	0–3	2nd
2001–02	UEFA Champions League	Second group stage	(Italy) Juventus	2–0	0–0	2nd
2001–02	UEFA Champions League	Quarter-finals	(England) Manchester United	0–2	2–3	2–5
2002–03	UEFA Champions League	Group stage	(Germany) Bayern Munich	2–1	3–2	2nd
2002–03	UEFA Champions League	Group stage	(Italy) Milan	0–4	2–1	2nd
2002–03	UEFA Champions League	Group stage	(France) Lens	3–1	1–3	2nd
2002–03	UEFA Champions League	Second group stage	(Italy) Juventus	2–2	2–3	4th
2002–03	UEFA Champions League	Second group stage	(England) Manchester United	2–0	0–2	4th
2002–03	UEFA Champions League	Second group stage	(Switzerland) Basel	1–0	0–1	4th
2003–04	UEFA Champions League	Third qualifying round	(Norway) Rosenborg	1–0	0–0	1–0
2003–04	UEFA Champions League	Group stage	(Greece) AEK Athens	3–0	1–1	2nd
2003–04	UEFA Champions League	Group stage	(Netherlands) PSV Eindhoven	2–0	2–3	2nd
2003–04	UEFA Champions League	Group stage	(France) Monaco	1–0	3–8	2nd
2003–04	UEFA Champions League	Round of 16	(Italy) Juventus	1–0	1–0	2–0
2003–04	UEFA Champions League	Quarter-finals	(Italy) Milan	4–0	1–4	5–4
2003–04	UEFA Champions League	Semi-finals	(Portugal) Porto	0–1	0–0	0–1
2004–05	UEFA Champions League	Third qualifying round	(Republic of Ireland) Shelbourne	3–0	0–0	3–0
2004–05	UEFA Champions League	Group stage	(Greece) Olympiacos	0–0	0–1	4th
2004–05	UEFA Champions League	Group stage	(France) Monaco	0–5	0–2	4th
2004–05	UEFA Champions League	Group stage	(England) Liverpool	0–1	0–0	4th
2005	UEFA Intertoto Cup	Second round	(Serbia and Montenegro) Budućnost Podgorica	3–0	1–2	4–2
2005	UEFA Intertoto Cup	Third round	(Croatia) Slaven Belupo	1–0	3–0	4–0
2005	UEFA Intertoto Cup	Semi–finals	(England) Newcastle United	2–1	2–1	4–2
2005	UEFA Intertoto Cup	Finals	(France) Marseille	2–0	1–5	3–5
2008–09	UEFA Intertoto Cup	Third round	(Israel) Bnei Sakhnin	1–0	2–1	3–1
2008–09	UEFA Cup	Second qualifying round	(Croatia) Hajduk Split	0–0	2–0	2–0
2008–09	UEFA Cup	First round	(Norway) Brann	2–0 (a.e.t.)	0–2	2–2 (3–2 p)
2008–09	UEFA Cup	Group stage	(Russia) CSKA Moscow	—N/a	0–3	2nd
2008–09	UEFA Cup	Group stage	(Netherlands) Feyenoord	3–0	—N/a	2nd
2008–09	UEFA Cup	Group stage	(Poland) Lech Poznań	—N/a	1–1	2nd
2008–09	UEFA Cup	Group stage	(France) Nancy	1–0	—N/a	2nd
2008–09	UEFA Cup	Round of 32	(Denmark) AaB	1–3	0–3	1–6
