= 2000–01 UEFA Champions League knockout stage =

International football competition

The knockout stage of the 2000–01 UEFA Champions League featured the eight teams that had finished in the top two of each of the four groups in the second group stage and lasted from 3 April to 23 May 2001. The knockout stage followed a simple, single-elimination format, with the ties in each round (except for the final) being played over two legs, with whichever team scored the most goals over the course of the two legs progressing to the next round. In the case of both teams scoring the same number of goals over the two legs, the winner would be determined by whichever team scored more goals in their away leg. If the teams could still not be separated, a period of golden goal extra time lasting 30 minutes (split into two 15-minute halves) would be played. If no goals are scored after extra time, the winner would be decided by a penalty shoot-out. As in every season of the competition, the final was played as a single match at a neutral venue, which in 2001 was the San Siro in Milan, Italy.

The final pitted three-time winners Bayern Munich of Germany against Spanish club Valencia, who were appearing in their second consecutive final, with Bayern winning 5–4 on penalties after the two teams could not be separated through 90 minutes and extra time. Bayern reached the final by knocking out the competition's last two champions – Manchester United (who had beaten Bayern in the 1999 final) and Real Madrid, who beat Valencia in 2000. Valencia, meanwhile, had to play two English sides en route to the final, first beating Arsenal then Leeds United. The other teams involved in the knockout stage were Galatasaray of Turkey and Deportivo La Coruña of Spain.

Times are CEST, as listed by UEFA.

== Qualified teams ==
The knockout staged involved the eight teams which qualified as winners and runners-up of each of the four groups in the second group stage.

Group	Winners (seeded in round of 16 draw)	Runners-up (unseeded in round of 16 draw)
A	(Spain) Valencia	(England) Manchester United
B	(Spain) Deportivo La Coruña	(Turkey) Galatasaray
C	(Germany) Bayern Munich	(England) Arsenal
D	(Spain) Real Madrid	(England) Leeds United

== Bracket ==
Quarter-finals
(Turkey) Galatasaray	3	0	3
(Spain) Real Madrid	2	3	5
(England) Manchester United	0	1	1
(Germany) Bayern Munich	1	2	3
(England) Leeds United	3	0	3
(Spain) Deportivo La Coruña	0	2	2
(England) Arsenal	2	0	2
(Spain) Valencia (a)	1	1	2

Semi-finals
(Spain) Real Madrid	0	1	1
(Germany) Bayern Munich	1	2	3
(England) Leeds United	0	0	0
(Spain) Valencia	0	3	3

Final
23 May – Milan
(Germany) Bayern Munich (p)	1 (5)
(Spain) Valencia	1 (4)

== Quarter-finals ==
=== Summary ===
Team 1	Agg.	Team 2	1st leg	2nd leg
Leeds United (England)	3–2	(Spain) Deportivo La Coruña	3–0	0–2
Arsenal (England)	2–2 (a)	(Spain) Valencia	2–1	0–1
Galatasaray (Turkey)	3–5	(Spain) Real Madrid	3–2	0–3
Manchester United (England)	1–3	(Germany) Bayern Munich	0–1	1–2

=== Matches ===
4 April 2001
20:45

Leeds United (England)	3–0	(Spain) Deportivo La Coruña
Harte 26'; Smith 51'; Ferdinand 66'	Report

Elland Road, Leeds
Attendance: 35,508
Referee: Gilles Veissière (France)
17 April 2001
20:45

Deportivo La Coruña (Spain)	2–0	(England) Leeds United
Djalminha 9' (pen.); Tristán 73'	Report

Estadio Riazor, A Coruña
Attendance: 27,364
Referee: Stefano Braschi (Italy)

Leeds United won 3–2 on aggregate.

4 April 2001
20:45

Arsenal (England)	2–1	(Spain) Valencia
Henry 58'; Parlour 60'	Report	Ayala 41'

Highbury, London
Attendance: 35,104
Referee: Dick Jol (Netherlands)
17 April 2001
20:45

Valencia (Spain)	1–0	(England) Arsenal
Carew 75'	Report

Mestalla, Valencia
Attendance: 41,341
Referee: Kim Milton Nielsen (Denmark)

2–2 on aggregate; Valencia won on away goals.

3 April 2001
20:45 (Note: The match was interrupted for three minutes after Galatasaray's third goal due to floodlight failure in the stadium.)

Galatasaray (Turkey)	3–2	(Spain) Real Madrid
Ümit 47' (pen.); Hasan Şaş 66'; Jardel 75'	Report	Helguera 33'; Makélélé 43'

Ali Sami Yen Stadium, Istanbul
Attendance: 22,000
Referee: Pierluigi Collina (Italy)
18 April 2001
20:45

Real Madrid (Spain)	3–0	(Turkey) Galatasaray
Raúl 15', 37'; Helguera 28'	Report

Santiago Bernabéu, Madrid
Attendance: 74,922
Referee: Anders Frisk (Sweden)

Real Madrid won 5–3 on aggregate.

3 April 2001
20:45

Manchester United (England)	0–1	(Germany) Bayern Munich
	Report	Paulo Sérgio 86'

Old Trafford, Manchester
Attendance: 66,584
Referee: Antonio López Nieto (Spain)
18 April 2001
20:45

Bayern Munich (Germany)	2–1	(England) Manchester United
Élber 5'; Scholl 40'	Report	Giggs 49'

Olympiastadion, Munich
Attendance: 60,000
Referee: Vítor Melo Pereira (Portugal)

Bayern Munich won 3–1 on aggregate.

== Semi-finals ==
=== Summary ===
Team 1	Agg.	Team 2	1st leg	2nd leg
Leeds United (England)	0–3	(Spain) Valencia	0–0	0–3
Real Madrid (Spain)	1–3	(Germany) Bayern Munich	0–1	1–2

=== Matches ===
2 May 2001
20:45

Leeds United (England)	0–0	(Spain) Valencia
	Report

Elland Road, Leeds
Attendance: 36,437
Referee: Pierluigi Collina (Italy)
8 May 2001
20:45

Valencia (Spain)	3–0	(England) Leeds United
Juan Sánchez 16', 47'; Mendieta 52'	Report

Mestalla, Valencia
Attendance: 51,100
Referee: Urs Meier (Switzerland)

Valencia won 3–0 on aggregate.

1 May 2001
20:45

Real Madrid (Spain)	0–1	(Germany) Bayern Munich
	Report	Élber 55'

Santiago Bernabéu, Madrid
Attendance: 74,112
Referee: Hugh Dallas (Scotland)
9 May 2001
20:45

Bayern Munich (Germany)	2–1	(Spain) Real Madrid
Élber 8'; Jeremies 34'	Report	Figo 18'

Olympiastadion, Munich
Attendance: 62,500
Referee: Kim Milton Nielsen (Denmark)

Bayern Munich won 3–1 on aggregate.

== Final ==
The final was played on 23 May 2001 at the San Siro in Milan, Italy.

23 May 2001
20:45

Bayern Munich (Germany)	1–1 (a.e.t.)	(Spain) Valencia
Effenberg 50' (pen.)	Report	Mendieta 3' (pen.)
Penalties
Paulo Sérgio (penalty missed); Salihamidžić (penalty scored); Zickler (penalty scored); Andersson (penalty missed); Effenberg (penalty scored); Lizarazu (penalty scored); Linke (penalty scored)	5–4	(penalty scored) Mendieta; (penalty scored) Carew; (penalty missed) Zahovič; (penalty missed) Carboni; (penalty scored) Baraja; (penalty scored) Kily; (penalty missed) Pellegrino

San Siro, Milan
Attendance: 79,000
Referee: Dick Jol (Netherlands)
