= 2000–01 UEFA Champions League =

European football tournament

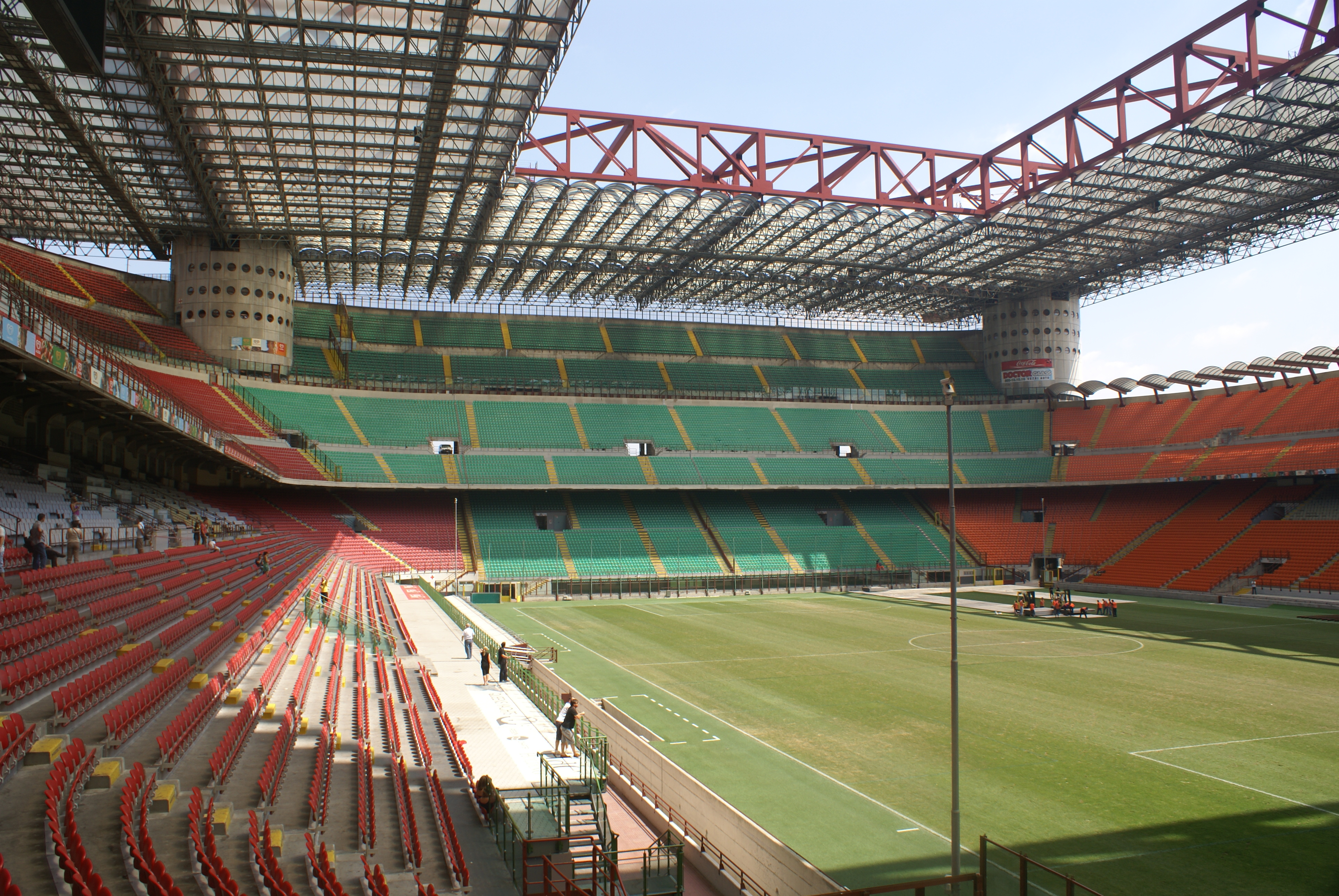
- The San Siro in Milan held the final

Tournament details
- Dates: Qualifying: 12 July – 23 August 2000; Competition proper: 12 September 2000 – 23 May 2001
- Teams: Competition proper: 32; Total: 72

Final positions
- Champions: (Germany) Bayern Munich (4th title)
- Runners-up: (Spain) Valencia

Tournament statistics
- Matches played: 157
- Goals scored: 449 (2.86 per match)
- Attendance: 5,688,155 (36,230 per match)
- Top scorer(s): Raúl (Real Madrid); 7 goals

The 2000–01 UEFA Champions League was the 46th season of the UEFA Champions League, UEFA's premier European club football tournament, and the ninth since it was rebranded from the "European Champion Clubs' Cup" or "European Cup". The competition was won by Bayern Munich for their first title since 1976, defeating Valencia 5–4 on penalties after a 1–1 draw after extra time. It was the German club's first UEFA Champions League title and their fourth European Cup overall; Valencia suffered their second consecutive final defeat, having lost to Real Madrid in the previous season. The knockout phase saw Bayern eliminate the preceding two Champions League winners, Manchester United and Real Madrid, winning all four games in the process. Valencia, meanwhile, defeated English sides Arsenal and Leeds United in the knockout phase en route to the final.

The 2001 final saw the two previous seasons' runners-up clash, Bayern Munich lost to Manchester United in the 1999 final and Valencia lost to Real Madrid in the 2000 final.

Real Madrid were the defending champions, but they were eliminated by eventual winners Bayern Munich in the semi-finals.

The 2001 final marked the first time a bespoke official match ball was used in the competition, introducing the Adidas Finale featuring the tournament's iconic starball design. Prior to this, home teams were responsible for providing the match balls, often using models from their own kit suppliers.

== Association team allocation ==
A total of 72 teams participated in the 2000–01 Champions League, from 48 of 51 UEFA associations. Liechtenstein (who don't have their own league) as well as Andorra and San Marino were not admitted.

Below is the qualification scheme for the 2000–01 UEFA Champions League:

- Associations 1–3 each have four teams qualify
- Associations 4–6 each have three teams qualify
- Associations 7–15 each have two teams qualify
- Associations 16–49 each have one team qualify (except Liechtenstein)

=== Association ranking ===
Countries are allocated places according to their 1999 UEFA league coefficient, which takes into account their performance in European competitions from 1994–95 to 1998–99.

Rank	Association	Coeff.	Teams
1	Italy	57.212	4
2	Spain	49.628	4
3	Germany	45.498	4
4	France	41.442	3
5	Netherlands	37.816	3
6	England	34.288	3
7	Russia	27.825	2
8	Greece	26.950	2
9	Portugal	24.716	2
10	Czech Republic	23.624	2
11	Austria	22.375	2
12	Denmark	21.050	2
13	Croatia	20.374	2
14	Turkey	20.350	2
15	Ukraine	20.291	2
16	Switzerland	20.000	1
17	Norway	19.733	1

Rank	Association	Coeff.	Teams
18	Belgium	19.600	1
19	Sweden	17.325	1
20	Poland	17.250	1
21	Scotland	16.625	1
22	Romania	16.200	1
23	Hungary	15.666	1
24	Slovakia	14.332	1
25	Cyprus	12.665	1
26	Georgia	12.166	1
27	Israel	11.541	1
28	Slovenia	10.831	1
29	Belarus	9.083	1
30	Finland	9.041	1
31	FR Yugoslavia	8.249	1
32	Bulgaria	7.582	1
33	Latvia	6.582	1
34	Iceland	6.332	1

Rank	Association	Coeff.	Teams
35	Macedonia	4.915	1
36	Lithuania	4.832	1
37	Moldova	4.333	1
38	Estonia	2.582	1
39	Armenia	2.416	1
40	Northern Ireland	1.998	1
41	Republic of Ireland	1.832	1
42	Wales	1.832	1
43	Malta	1.498	1
44	Faroe Islands	1.249	1
45	Albania	1.166	1
46	Luxembourg	1.166	1
47	Liechtenstein	1.000	0
48	Azerbaijan	0.916	1
49	Bosnia and Herzegovina	0.500	1
50	Andorra	0.000	0
51	San Marino	0.000	0

=== Distribution ===
The title holders Real Madrid finished 5th in domestic league. As a result, La Liga 4th-placed team Zaragoza were demoted to UEFA Cup and their Champions League Third qualifying round spot was vacated. The following changes to the default access list are made:

- The champions of association 16 (Switzerland) are promoted from the second qualifying round to the third qualifying round.
- The champions of associations 27 and 28 (Israel and Slovenia) are promoted from the first qualifying round to the second qualifying round.

	Teams entering in this round	Teams advancing from previous round
First qualifying round (20 teams)	20 champions from associations 29–49 (except Liechtenstein)	
Second qualifying round (28 teams)	12 champions from associations 17–28; 6 runners-up from associations 10–15	10 winners from the first qualifying round
Third qualifying round (32 teams)	7 champions from associations 10–16; 3 runners-up from associations 7–9; 6 third-place finishers from associations 1–6; 2 fourth-place finishers from associations 1–3 (except Spain)	14 winners from the second qualifying round
Group stage (32 teams)	1 Champions League title holder (Real Madrid); 9 champions from associations 1–9; 6 runners-up from associations 1–6	16 winners from the third qualifying round
Second group stage (16 teams)		8 group winners from the first group stage; 8 group runners-up from the first group stage
Knockout phase (8 teams)		4 group winners from the second group stage; 4 group runners-up from the second group stage

=== Teams ===
League positions of the previous season shown in parentheses (TH: Champions League title holders).

Group stage
(Italy) Lazio (1st)	(Spain) Real Madrid (5th)^{TH}	(France) Paris Saint-Germain (2nd)	(England) Arsenal (2nd)
(Italy) Juventus (2nd)	(Germany) Bayern Munich (1st)	(Netherlands) PSV Eindhoven (1st)	(Russia) Spartak Moscow (1st)
(Spain) Deportivo La Coruña (1st)	(Germany) Bayer Leverkusen (2nd)	(Netherlands) Heerenveen (2nd)	(Greece) Olympiacos (1st)
(Spain) Barcelona (2nd)	(France) Monaco (1st)	(England) Manchester United (1st)	(Portugal) Sporting CP (1st)
Third qualifying round
(Italy) Milan (3rd)	(France) Lyon (3rd)	(Portugal) Porto (2nd)	(Croatia) Dinamo Zagreb (1st)
(Italy) Internazionale (4th)	(Netherlands) Feyenoord (3rd)	(Czech Republic) Sparta Prague (1st)	(Turkey) Galatasaray (1st)
(Spain) Valencia (3rd)	(England) Leeds United (3rd)	(Austria) Tirol Innsbruck (1st)	(Ukraine) Dynamo Kyiv (1st)
(Germany) Hamburger SV (3rd)	(Russia) Lokomotiv Moscow (2nd)	(Denmark) Herfølge (1st)	(Switzerland) St. Gallen (1st)
(Germany) 1860 Munich (4th)	(Greece) Panathinaikos (2nd)		
Second qualifying round
(Czech Republic) Slavia Prague (2nd)	(Ukraine) Shakhtar Donetsk (2nd)	(Scotland) Rangers (1st)	(Cyprus) Anorthosis Famagusta (1st)
(Austria) Sturm Graz (2nd)	(Norway) Rosenborg (1st)	(Romania) Dinamo București (1st)	(Georgia (country)) Torpedo Kutaisi (1st)
(Denmark) Brøndby (2nd)	(Belgium) Anderlecht (1st)	(Hungary) Dunaferr (1st)	(Israel) Hapoel Tel Aviv (1st)
(Croatia) Hajduk Split (2nd)	(Sweden) Helsingborgs IF (1st)	(Slovakia) Inter Slovnaft Bratislava (1st)	(Slovenia) Maribor (1st)
(Turkey) Beşiktaş (2nd)	(Poland) Polonia Warsaw (1st)		
First qualifying round
(Belarus) BATE Borisov (1st)	(Iceland) KR (1st)	(Armenia) Shirak (1st)	(Faroe Islands) KÍ (1st)
(Finland) Haka (1st)	(North Macedonia) Sloga Jugomagnat (1st)	(Northern Ireland) Linfield (1st)	(Albania) Tirana (1st)
(Federal Republic of Yugoslavia) Red Star Belgrade (1st)	(Lithuania) Kaunas (1st)	(Republic of Ireland) Shelbourne (1st)	(Luxembourg) F91 Dudelange (1st)
(Bulgaria) Levski Sofia (1st)	(Moldova) Zimbru Chișinău (1st)	(Wales) Total Network Solutions (1st)	(Azerbaijan) Shamkir (1st)
(Latvia) Skonto (1st)	(Estonia) Levadia Maardu (1st)	(Malta) Birkirkara (1st)	(Bosnia and Herzegovina) Brotnjo (1st)

== Round and draw dates ==
The schedule of the competition was as follows (all draws were held in Geneva, Switzerland, unless stated otherwise).

Phase	Round	Draw date	First leg	Second leg
Qualifying	First qualifying round	23 June 2000	12 July 2000	19 July 2000
Qualifying	Second qualifying round	23 June 2000	26 July 2000	2 August 2000
Qualifying	Third qualifying round	21 July 2000 (Nyon)	8–9 August 2000	22–23 August 2000
First group stage	Matchday 1	25 August 2000 (Monaco)	12–13 September 2000	
First group stage	Matchday 2	25 August 2000 (Monaco)	19–20 September 2000	
First group stage	Matchday 3	25 August 2000 (Monaco)	26–27 September 2000	
First group stage	Matchday 4	25 August 2000 (Monaco)	17–18 October 2000	
First group stage	Matchday 5	25 August 2000 (Monaco)	24–25 October 2000	
First group stage	Matchday 6	25 August 2000 (Monaco)	7–8 November 2000	
Second group stage	Matchday 1	10 November 2000	21–22 November 2000	
Second group stage	Matchday 2	10 November 2000	5–6 December 2000	
Second group stage	Matchday 3	10 November 2000	13–14 February 2001	
Second group stage	Matchday 4	10 November 2000	20–21 February 2001	
Second group stage	Matchday 5	10 November 2000	6–7 March 2001	
Second group stage	Matchday 6	10 November 2000	13–14 March 2001	
Knockout phase	Quarter-finals	16 March 2001	3–4 April 2001	17–18 April 2001
Knockout phase	Semi-finals	16 March 2001	1–2 May 2001	8–9 May 2001
Knockout phase	Final	16 March 2001	23 May 2001 at San Siro, Milan	

== Qualifying rounds ==
=== First qualifying round ===
Team 1	Agg.	Team 2	1st leg	2nd leg
Birkirkara (Malta)	2–6	(Iceland) KR	1–2	1–4
F91 Dudelange (Luxembourg)	0–6	(Bulgaria) Levski Sofia	0–4	0–2
Haka (Finland)	2–2 (a)	(Northern Ireland) Linfield	1–0	1–2
KÍ (Faroe Islands)	0–5	(Federal Republic of Yugoslavia) Red Star Belgrade	0–3	0–2
Total Network Solutions (Wales)	2–6	(Estonia) Levadia Maardu	2–2	0–4
Shirak (Armenia)	2–3	(Belarus) BATE Borisov	1–1	1–2
Skonto (Latvia)	3–5	(Azerbaijan) Shamkir	2–1	1–4 (a.e.t.)
Sloga Jugomagnat (North Macedonia)	1–2	(Republic of Ireland) Shelbourne	0–1	1–1
Tirana (Albania)	4–6	(Moldova) Zimbru Chișinău	2–3	2–3
Kaunas (Lithuania)	4–3	(Bosnia and Herzegovina) Brotnjo	4–0	0–3

=== Second qualifying round ===
Team 1	Agg.	Team 2	1st leg	2nd leg
Anderlecht (Belgium)	4–2	(Cyprus) Anorthosis Famagusta	4–2	0–0
Beşiktaş (Turkey)	2–1	(Bulgaria) Levski Sofia	1–0	1–1
Brøndby (Denmark)	3–1	(Iceland) KR	3–1	0–0
Dinamo București (Romania)	4–7	(Poland) Polonia Warsaw	3–4	1–3
Rangers (Scotland)	4–1	(Lithuania) Kaunas	4–1	0–0
Haka (Finland)	0–1	(Slovakia) Inter Slovnaft Bratislava	0–0	0–1 (a.e.t.)
Helsingborgs IF (Sweden)	3–0	(Belarus) BATE Borisov	0–0	3–0
Red Star Belgrade (Federal Republic of Yugoslavia)	4–2	(Georgia (country)) Torpedo Kutaisi	4–0	0–2
Shakhtar Donetsk (Ukraine)	9–2	(Estonia) Levadia Maardu	4–1	5–1
Slavia Prague (Czech Republic)	5–1	(Azerbaijan) Shamkir	1–0	4–1
Shelbourne (Republic of Ireland)	2–4	(Norway) Rosenborg	1–3	1–1
Sturm Graz (Austria)	5–1	(Israel) Hapoel Tel Aviv	3–0	2–1
Zimbru Chișinău (Moldova)	2–1	(Slovenia) Maribor	2–0	0–1
Hajduk Split (Croatia)	2–4	(Hungary) Dunaferr	0–2	2–2

=== Third qualifying round ===
The losing teams advanced to the first round of the 2000–01 UEFA Cup.

Team 1	Agg.	Team 2	1st leg	2nd leg
Tirol Innsbruck (Austria)	1–4	(Spain) Valencia	0–0	1–4
Zimbru Chișinău (Moldova)	0–2	(Czech Republic) Sparta Prague	0–1	0–1
Brøndby (Denmark)	0–2	(Germany) Hamburger SV	0–2	0–0
Helsingborgs IF (Sweden)	1–0	(Italy) Internazionale	1–0	0–0
Beşiktaş (Turkey)	6–1	(Russia) Lokomotiv Moscow	3–0	3–1
Inter Slovnaft Bratislava (Slovakia)	2–4	(France) Lyon	1–2	1–2
Anderlecht (Belgium)	1–0	(Portugal) Porto	1–0	0–0
Herfølge (Denmark)	0–6	(Scotland) Rangers	0–3	0–3
Dynamo Kyiv (Ukraine)	1–1 (a)	(Federal Republic of Yugoslavia) Red Star Belgrade	0–0	1–1
Polonia Warsaw (Poland)	3–4	(Greece) Panathinaikos	2–2	1–2
Leeds United (England)	3–1	(Germany) 1860 Munich	2–1	1–0
Sturm Graz (Austria)	3–2	(Netherlands) Feyenoord	2–1	1–1
Dunaferr (Hungary)	3–4	(Norway) Rosenborg	2–2	1–2
St. Gallen (Switzerland)	3–4	(Turkey) Galatasaray	1–2	2–2
Milan (Italy)	6–1	(Croatia) Dinamo Zagreb	3–1	3–0
Shakhtar Donetsk (Ukraine)	2–1	(Czech Republic) Slavia Prague	0–1	2–0 (a.e.t.)

== First group stage ==
Location of teams of the 2000–01 UEFA Champions League first group stage.
Brown: Group A; Red: Group B; Orange: Group C; Yellow: Group D;
Green: Group E; Blue: Group F; Purple: Group G; Pink: Group H.

16 winners from the third qualifying round, 10 champions from countries ranked 1–10, and six second-placed teams from countries ranked 1–6 were drawn into eight groups of four teams each. The top two teams in each group advanced to the second group stage, and the third placed team in each group advanced to round 3 of the 2000–01 UEFA Cup.

Deportivo La Coruña, Hamburger SV, Heerenveen, Helsingborgs IF, Leeds United, Lyon and Shakhtar Donetsk made their debut in the group stage.

=== Group A ===
Pos	Team	Pld	W	D	L	GF	GA	GD	Pts	Qualification	RMA	SPM	LEV	SPO
1	(Spain) Real Madrid	6	4	1	1	15	8	+7	13	Advance to second group stage	—	1–0	5–3	4–0
2	(Russia) Spartak Moscow	6	4	0	2	9	3	+6	12	Advance to second group stage	1–0	—	2–0	3–1
3	(Germany) Bayer Leverkusen	6	2	1	3	9	12	−3	7	Transfer to UEFA Cup	2–3	1–0	—	3–2
4	(Portugal) Sporting CP	6	0	2	4	5	15	−10	2		2–2	0–3	0–0	—

Source: UEFA

=== Group B ===
Pos	Team	Pld	W	D	L	GF	GA	GD	Pts	Qualification	ARS	LAZ	SHK	SPP
1	(England) Arsenal	6	4	1	1	11	8	+3	13	Advance to second group stage	—	2–0	3–2	4–2
2	(Italy) Lazio	6	4	1	1	13	4	+9	13	Advance to second group stage	1–1	—	5–1	3–0
3	(Ukraine) Shakhtar Donetsk	6	2	0	4	10	15	−5	6	Transfer to UEFA Cup	3–0	0–3	—	2–1
4	(Czech Republic) Sparta Prague	6	1	0	5	6	13	−7	3		0–1	0–1	3–2	—

Source: UEFA

=== Group C ===
Pos	Team	Pld	W	D	L	GF	GA	GD	Pts	Qualification	VAL	LYO	OLY	HVN
1	(Spain) Valencia	6	4	1	1	7	4	+3	13	Advance to second group stage	—	1–0	2–1	1–1
2	(France) Lyon	6	3	0	3	8	6	+2	9	Advance to second group stage	1–2	—	1–0	3–1
3	(Greece) Olympiacos	6	3	0	3	6	5	+1	9	Transfer to UEFA Cup	1–0	2–1	—	2–0
4	(Netherlands) Heerenveen	6	1	1	4	3	9	−6	4		0–1	0–2	1–0	—

Source: UEFA

=== Group D ===
Pos	Team	Pld	W	D	L	GF	GA	GD	Pts	Qualification	STM	GAL	RAN	MON
1	(Austria) Sturm Graz	6	3	1	2	9	12	−3	10	Advance to second group stage	—	3–0	2–0	2–0
2	(Turkey) Galatasaray	6	2	2	2	10	13	−3	8	Advance to second group stage	2–2	—	3–2	3–2
3	(Scotland) Rangers	6	2	2	2	10	7	+3	8	Transfer to UEFA Cup	5–0	0–0	—	2–2
4	(France) Monaco	6	2	1	3	13	10	+3	7		5–0	4–2	0–1	—

Source: UEFA

=== Group E ===
Pos	Team	Pld	W	D	L	GF	GA	GD	Pts	Qualification	DEP	PAN	HAM	JUV
1	(Spain) Deportivo La Coruña	6	2	4	0	6	4	+2	10	Advance to second group stage	—	1–0	2–1	1–1
2	(Greece) Panathinaikos	6	2	2	2	6	5	+1	8	Advance to second group stage	1–1	—	0–0	3–1
3	(Germany) Hamburger SV	6	1	3	2	9	9	0	6	Transfer to UEFA Cup	1–1	0–1	—	4–4
4	(Italy) Juventus	6	1	3	2	9	12	−3	6		0–0	2–1	1–3	—

Source: UEFA

=== Group F ===
Pos	Team	Pld	W	D	L	GF	GA	GD	Pts	Qualification	BAY	PAR	ROS	HEL
1	(Germany) Bayern Munich	6	3	2	1	9	4	+5	11	Advance to second group stage	—	2–0	3–1	0–0
2	(France) Paris Saint-Germain	6	3	1	2	14	9	+5	10	Advance to second group stage	1–0	—	7–2	4–1
3	(Norway) Rosenborg	6	2	1	3	13	15	−2	7	Transfer to UEFA Cup	1–1	3–1	—	6–1
4	(Sweden) Helsingborgs IF	6	1	2	3	6	14	−8	5		1–3	1–1	2–0	—

Source: UEFA

=== Group G ===
Pos	Team	Pld	W	D	L	GF	GA	GD	Pts	Qualification	AND	MUN	PSV	DKV
1	(Belgium) Anderlecht	6	4	0	2	11	14	−3	12	Advance to second group stage	—	2–1	1–0	4–2
2	(England) Manchester United	6	3	1	2	11	7	+4	10	Advance to second group stage	5–1	—	3–1	1–0
3	(Netherlands) PSV Eindhoven	6	3	0	3	9	9	0	9	Transfer to UEFA Cup	2–3	3–1	—	2–1
4	(Ukraine) Dynamo Kyiv	6	1	1	4	7	8	−1	4		4–0	0–0	0–1	—

Source: UEFA

=== Group H ===
Pos	Team	Pld	W	D	L	GF	GA	GD	Pts	Qualification	MIL	LEE	BAR	BES
1	(Italy) Milan	6	3	2	1	12	6	+6	11	Advance to second group stage	—	1–1	3–3	4–1
2	(England) Leeds United	6	2	3	1	9	6	+3	9	Advance to second group stage	1–0	—	1–1	6–0
3	(Spain) Barcelona	6	2	2	2	13	9	+4	8	Transfer to UEFA Cup	0–2	4–0	—	5–0
4	(Turkey) Beşiktaş	6	1	1	4	4	17	−13	4		0–2	0–0	3–0	—

Source: UEFA

== Second group stage ==
Eight winners and eight runners-up from the first group stage were drawn into four groups of four teams each, each containing two group winners and two runners-up. Teams from the same country or from the same first-round group could not be drawn together. The top two teams in each group advanced to the quarter-finals.

=== Group A ===
Pos	Team	Pld	W	D	L	GF	GA	GD	Pts	Qualification	VAL	MUN	STM	PAN
1	(Spain) Valencia	6	3	3	0	10	2	+8	12	Advance to knockout stage	—	0–0	2–0	2–1
2	(England) Manchester United	6	3	3	0	10	3	+7	12	Advance to knockout stage	1–1	—	3–0	3–1
3	(Austria) Sturm Graz	6	2	0	4	4	13	−9	6		0–5	0–2	—	2–0
4	(Greece) Panathinaikos	6	0	2	4	4	10	−6	2		0–0	1–1	1–2	—

Source: UEFA

=== Group B ===
Pos	Team	Pld	W	D	L	GF	GA	GD	Pts	Qualification	DEP	GAL	MIL	PAR
1	(Spain) Deportivo La Coruña	6	3	1	2	10	7	+3	10	Advance to knockout stage	—	2–0	0–1	4–3
2	(Turkey) Galatasaray	6	3	1	2	6	6	0	10	Advance to knockout stage	1–0	—	2–0	1–0
3	(Italy) Milan	6	1	4	1	6	7	−1	7		1–1	2–2	—	1–1
4	(France) Paris Saint-Germain	6	1	2	3	8	10	−2	5		1–3	2–0	1–1	—

Source: UEFA

=== Group C ===
Pos	Team	Pld	W	D	L	GF	GA	GD	Pts	Qualification	BAY	ARS	LYO	SPM
1	(Germany) Bayern Munich	6	4	1	1	8	5	+3	13	Advance to knockout stage	—	1–0	1–0	1–0
2	(England) Arsenal	6	2	2	2	6	8	−2	8	Advance to knockout stage	2–2	—	1–1	1–0
3	(France) Lyon	6	2	2	2	8	4	+4	8		3–0	0–1	—	3–0
4	(Russia) Spartak Moscow	6	1	1	4	5	10	−5	4		0–3	4–1	1–1	—

Source: UEFA

=== Group D ===
Pos	Team	Pld	W	D	L	GF	GA	GD	Pts	Qualification	RMA	LEE	AND	LAZ
1	(Spain) Real Madrid	6	4	1	1	14	9	+5	13	Advance to knockout stage	—	3–2	4–1	3–2
2	(England) Leeds United	6	3	1	2	12	10	+2	10	Advance to knockout stage	0–2	—	2–1	3–3
3	(Belgium) Anderlecht	6	2	0	4	7	12	−5	6		2–0	1–4	—	1–0
4	(Italy) Lazio	6	1	2	3	9	11	−2	5		2–2	0–1	2–1	—

Source: UEFA

== Knockout phase ==
=== Bracket ===
Quarter-finals
(Turkey) Galatasaray	3	0	3
(Spain) Real Madrid	2	3	5
(England) Manchester United	0	1	1
(Germany) Bayern Munich	1	2	3
(England) Leeds United	3	0	3
(Spain) Deportivo La Coruña	0	2	2
(England) Arsenal	2	0	2
(Spain) Valencia (a)	1	1	2

Semi-finals
(Spain) Real Madrid	0	1	1
(Germany) Bayern Munich	1	2	3
(England) Leeds United	0	0	0
(Spain) Valencia	0	3	3

Final
23 May – Milan
(Germany) Bayern Munich (p)	1 (5)
(Spain) Valencia	1 (4)

=== Quarter-finals ===
Team 1	Agg.	Team 2	1st leg	2nd leg
Leeds United (England)	3–2	(Spain) Deportivo La Coruña	3–0	0–2
Arsenal (England)	2–2 (a)	(Spain) Valencia	2–1	0–1
Galatasaray (Turkey)	3–5	(Spain) Real Madrid	3–2	0–3
Manchester United (England)	1–3	(Germany) Bayern Munich	0–1	1–2

=== Semi-finals ===
Team 1	Agg.	Team 2	1st leg	2nd leg
Leeds United (England)	0–3	(Spain) Valencia	0–0	0–3
Real Madrid (Spain)	1–3	(Germany) Bayern Munich	0–1	1–2

=== Final ===
The final was played on 23 May 2001 at the San Siro in Milan, Italy.

23 May 2001
20:45 UTC+2

Bayern Munich (Germany)	1–1 (a.e.t.)	(Spain) Valencia
Effenberg 50' (pen.)	Report	Mendieta 3' (pen.)
Penalties
Paulo Sérgio (penalty missed); Salihamidžić (penalty scored); Zickler (penalty scored); Andersson (penalty missed); Effenberg (penalty scored); Lizarazu (penalty scored); Linke (penalty scored)	5–4	(penalty scored) Mendieta; (penalty scored) Carew; (penalty missed) Zahovič; (penalty missed) Carboni; (penalty scored) Baraja; (penalty scored) Kily; (penalty missed) Pellegrino

San Siro, Milan
Attendance: 79,000
Referee: Dick Jol (Netherlands)

== Statistics ==
Statistics exclude qualifying rounds.

=== Top goalscorers ===
Rank	Name	Team	Goals	Minutes played
1	(Spain) Raúl	(Spain) Real Madrid	7	995
2	(Italy) Marco Simone	(France) Monaco	6	505
2	(Brazil) Rivaldo	(Spain) Barcelona	6	523
2	(Brazil) Giovane Élber	(Germany) Bayern Munich	6	1034
2	(England) Paul Scholes	(England) Manchester United	6	1042
2	(England) Lee Bowyer	(England) Leeds United	6	1170
2	(Spain) Iván Helguera	(Spain) Real Madrid	6	1232
2	(Brazil) Mário Jardel	(Turkey) Galatasaray	6	1240
9	(Italy) Filippo Inzaghi	(Italy) Juventus	5	431
9	(Argentina) Claudio López	(Italy) Lazio	5	464
9	(Norway) Frode Johnsen	(Norway) Rosenborg	5	509
9	(Brazil) Christian	(France) Paris Saint-Germain	5	586
9	(Uruguay) Walter Pandiani	(Spain) Deportivo La Coruña	5	664
9	(England) Teddy Sheringham	(England) Manchester United	5	720
9	(France) Nicolas Anelka	(France) Paris Saint-Germain	5	734
9	(Spain) Juan Sánchez	(Spain) Valencia	5	1018
9	(Canada) Tomasz Radzinski	(Belgium) Anderlecht	5	1021
9	(Ukraine) Andriy Shevchenko	(Italy) Milan	5	1080
9	(Portugal) Luís Figo	(Spain) Real Madrid	5	1205
9	(Germany) Mehmet Scholl	(Germany) Bayern Munich	5	1207
9	(England) Alan Smith	(England) Leeds United	5	1248

== See also ==
- 2000–01 UEFA Cup
- 2001 UEFA Super Cup
- 2000 UEFA Intertoto Cup
