= Nikola Juričić =

Bosnian footballer (born 1970)

Personal information
- Date of birth: 5 August 1970 (age 56)
- Place of birth: Čitluk, SFR Yugoslavia
- Position: Forward

Senior career*
Years	Team	Apps	(Gls)
1990–1991	Velež Mostar	11	(1)
1992–1993	Osijek	10	(1)
1993–1994	Varteks	10	(0)
1994–1995	Neretva	16	(3)
1995–1996	HNK Dubrovnik		
1996–1998	Greuther Fürth	7	(1)
1999–2001	Brotnjo	37	(16)
2001–2006	Široki Brijeg	75+	(25+)

Managerial career
- 2016–2018: Brotnjo
- * Club domestic league appearances and goals

Nikola Juričić (born 5 August 1970) is a Bosnia and Herzegovina former professional footballer who played as a forward. His son is fellow football player Luka Juričić. He spent most of his career in Croatia and Bosnia-Herzegovina, but also had a spell in Germany.
