= Sigþór Júlíusson =

Icelandic footballer

Personal information
- Date of birth: 27 April 1975 (age 51)
- Height: 1.73 m (5 ft 8 in)
- Position: Defender

Senior career*
Years	Team	Apps	(Gls)
1992–1994	KA		
1995–1996	Valur		
1997–2004	KR		
2005	Valur		
2006	Völsungur		
2006–2007	KR		

International career
2000	Iceland	1	(0)
- * Club domestic league appearances and goals

Sigþór Júlíusson (born 27 April 1975) is a retired Icelandic football defender.
