= Miro Katić =

Bosnian-Herzegovinian retired footballer (born 1974)

Personal information
- Full name: Miro Katić
- Date of birth: 2 February 1974 (age 52)
- Place of birth: Split, SFR Yugoslavia
- Height: 1.78 m (5 ft 10 in)
- Position: Midfielder

Senior career*
Years	Team	Apps	(Gls)
1992	HAŠK Građanski	3	(0)
1993	Šibenik	15	(1)
1993–1994	Osijek	12	(2)
1994–1996	Croatia Zagreb		
1996–1998	Hrvatski Dragovoljac	29	(0)
2000	Brotnjo	7	(1)
2000–2003	Široki Brijeg	69	(26)
2003	Torpedo-Metallurg	7	(0)
2004–2006	Međimurje	14	(1)
2007	Posušje	15	(2)
2007	Solin	8	(1)
2008	RNK Split		

International career
2002	Bosnia and Herzegovina	1	(0)
- * Club domestic league appearances and goals

Miro Katić (born 2 February 1974) is a Bosnian-Herzegovinian retired footballer.

== Club career ==
Katić previously played for NK Međimurje in the Croatian Prva HNL.

== International career ==
He made his debut for Bosnia and Herzegovina in an April 2002 friendly match against Croatia, coming on as a second haf substitute for Sergej Barbarez. It remained his sole international appearance.
