= Thomas Lindrup =

Danish footballer (born 1976)

Personal information
- Date of birth: 21 May 1976 (age 50)
- Place of birth: Denmark
- Height: 1.83 m (6 ft 0 in)
- Position: Winger

Senior career*
Years	Team	Apps	(Gls)
1996–2002	Brøndby IF	128	(16)
2003–2004	Odense BK	55	(9)
2005–2006	Aarhus GF	28	(2)
2006–2007	FC Nordsjælland	23	(1)
2008	Hvidovre IF	8	(0)
2009	Boldklubben Frem	0	(0)
- * Club domestic league appearances and goals as of 16 January 2008

Thomas Lindrup (born 21 May 1976) is a Danish former professional football winger.

He previously played for Danish Superliga sides FC Nordsjælland, AGF, OB and Brøndby IF. He was capped twice for Denmark's U19 team.
