= 2000–01 UEFA Champions League second group stage =

International football competition

The second group stage of the 2000–01 UEFA Champions League was played from 21 November 2000 to 14 March 2001. Eight winners and eight runners up from the first group stage were drawn into four groups of four, each containing two group winners and two runners-up. Teams from the same country or from the same first round group cannot be drawn together. The top two teams from each group advanced to the quarter-finals.

== Teams ==
Seeding was determined by the UEFA coefficients and participants' first group stage positions. Four best-ranked group winners were seeded in Pot 1, the remaining four in Pot 2. Group runners-up were seeded to Pots 3 and 4 accordingly.

Key to colours in group tables
Group winners and runners-up advance to the knockout stage

Pot 1 (higher-coefficient group winners)
Team	Coeff.
(Spain) Real Madrid	99.799
(Germany) Bayern Munich	103.201
(Spain) Valencia	69.799
(Italy) Milan	53.964

Pot 2 (lower-coefficient group winners)
Team	Coeff.
(Spain) Deportivo La Coruña	53.799
(England) Arsenal	52.727
(Belgium) Anderlecht	27.525
(Austria) Sturm Graz	26.250

Pot 3 (higher-coefficient group runners-up)
Team	Coeff.
(Italy) Lazio	94.963
(England) Manchester United	89.727
(Russia) Spartak Moscow	65.637
(France) Paris Saint-Germain	64.363

Pot 4 (lower-coefficient group runners-up)
Team	Coeff.
(France) Lyon	60.364
(Turkey) Galatasaray	51.925
(Greece) Panathinaikos	44.433
(England) Leeds United	43.728

Notes

1. ^{TH} Champions League title holders

== Groups ==
=== Group A ===
Pos	Team	Pld	W	D	L	GF	GA	GD	Pts	Qualification	VAL	MUN	STM	PAN
1	(Spain) Valencia	6	3	3	0	10	2	+8	12	Advance to knockout stage	—	0–0	2–0	2–1
2	(England) Manchester United	6	3	3	0	10	3	+7	12	Advance to knockout stage	1–1	—	3–0	3–1
3	(Austria) Sturm Graz	6	2	0	4	4	13	−9	6		0–5	0–2	—	2–0
4	(Greece) Panathinaikos	6	0	2	4	4	10	−6	2		0–0	1–1	1–2	—

Source: UEFA
21 November 2000
20:45

Manchester United (England)	3–1	(Greece) Panathinaikos
Sheringham 48'; Scholes 81', 90'	Report	Karagounis 64'

Old Trafford, Manchester
Attendance: 65,024
Referee: Domenico Messina (Italy)
21 November 2000
20:45

Valencia (Spain)	2–0	(Austria) Sturm Graz
Carew 45'; Juan Sánchez 47'	Report

Mestalla, Valencia
Attendance: 26,142
Referee: Kim Milton Nielsen (Denmark)

6 December 2000
20:45

Sturm Graz (Austria)	0–2	(England) Manchester United
	Report	Scholes 18'; Giggs 89'

Arnold-Schwarzenegger-Stadion, Graz
Attendance: 16,500
Referee: Anders Frisk (Sweden)
6 December 2000
20:45

Panathinaikos (Greece)	0–0	(Spain) Valencia
	Report

Spiros Louis Olympic Stadium, Athens
Attendance: 42,068
Referee: Markus Merk (Germany)

14 February 2001
20:45

Valencia (Spain)	0–0	(England) Manchester United
	Report

Mestalla, Valencia
Attendance: 49,450
Referee: Dick Jol (Netherlands)
14 February 2001
20:45

Sturm Graz (Austria)	2–0	(Greece) Panathinaikos
Haas 60'; Kocijan 85'	Report

Arnold-Schwarzenegger-Stadion, Graz
Attendance: 16,500
Referee: Ryszard Wójcik (Poland)

20 February 2001
20:45

Manchester United (England)	1–1	(Spain) Valencia
Cole 12'	Report	Brown 87' (o.g.)

Old Trafford, Manchester
Attendance: 66,715
Referee: Hellmut Krug (Germany)
20 February 2001
20:45

Panathinaikos (Greece)	1–2	(Austria) Sturm Graz
Goumas 73'	Report	Schopp 25'; Haas 42'

Spiros Louis Olympic Stadium, Athens
Attendance: 14,413
Referee: Alain Sars (France)

7 March 2001
20:45

Panathinaikos (Greece)	1–1	(England) Manchester United
Seitaridis 25'	Report	Scholes 90+2'

Spiros Louis Olympic Stadium, Athens
Attendance: 27,231
Referee: Karl-Erik Nilsson (Sweden)
7 March 2001
20:45

Sturm Graz (Austria)	0–5	(Spain) Valencia
	Report	Ayala 5'; Carew 50'; Kily González 60'; Diego Alonso 88', 90+1'

Arnold-Schwarzenegger-Stadion, Graz
Attendance: 16,200
Referee: Stefano Braschi (Italy)

13 March 2001
20:45

Manchester United (England)	3–0	(Austria) Sturm Graz
Butt 5'; Sheringham 20'; Keane 86'	Report

Old Trafford, Manchester
Attendance: 66,404
Referee: Valentin Ivanov (Russia)
13 March 2001
20:45

Valencia (Spain)	2–1	(Greece) Panathinaikos
Juan Sánchez 39'; Angloma 75'	Report	Basinas 28' (pen.)

Mestalla, Valencia
Attendance: 28,700
Referee: Knud Erik Fisker (Denmark)

=== Group B ===
Pos	Team	Pld	W	D	L	GF	GA	GD	Pts	Qualification	DEP	GAL	MIL	PAR
1	(Spain) Deportivo La Coruña	6	3	1	2	10	7	+3	10	Advance to knockout stage	—	2–0	0–1	4–3
2	(Turkey) Galatasaray	6	3	1	2	6	6	0	10	Advance to knockout stage	1–0	—	2–0	1–0
3	(Italy) Milan	6	1	4	1	6	7	−1	7		1–1	2–2	—	1–1
4	(France) Paris Saint-Germain	6	1	2	3	8	10	−2	5		1–3	2–0	1–1	—

Source: UEFA
21 November 2000
20:45

Milan (Italy)	2–2	(Turkey) Galatasaray
José Mari 47'; Shevchenko 73' (pen.)	Report	Jardel 39'; Hasan Şaş 41'

San Siro, Milan
Attendance: 46,234
Referee: Urs Meier (Switzerland)
21 November 2000
20:45

Paris Saint-Germain (France)	1–3	(Spain) Deportivo La Coruña
Algerino 37'	Report	Naybet 64'; Turu Flores 70'; Makaay 90+2'

Parc des Princes, Paris
Attendance: 31,890
Referee: Hellmut Krug (Germany)

6 December 2000
20:45

Deportivo La Coruña (Spain)	0–1	(Italy) Milan
	Report	Helveg 45+1'

Estadio Riazor, A Coruña
Attendance: 30,135
Referee: Graham Poll (England)
6 December 2000
20:45

Galatasaray (Turkey)	1–0	(France) Paris Saint-Germain
Davala 51' (pen.)	Report

Ali Sami Yen Stadium, Istanbul
Attendance: 19,021
Referee: Ryszard Wójcik (Poland)

14 February 2001
20:45

Milan (Italy)	1–1	(France) Paris Saint-Germain
Leonardo 27'	Report	Anelka 30'

San Siro, Milan
Attendance: 50,043
Referee: Anders Frisk (Sweden)
14 February 2001
20:45

Galatasaray (Turkey)	1–0	(Spain) Deportivo La Coruña
Kaya 11'	Report

Ali Sami Yen Stadium, Istanbul
Attendance: 20,158
Referee: Kim Milton Nielsen (Denmark)

20 February 2001
20:45

Paris Saint-Germain (France)	1–1	(Italy) Milan
Robert 75'	Report	José Mari 90+1'

Parc des Princes, Paris
Attendance: 41,450
Referee: Jan Wegereef (Netherlands)
20 February 2001
20:45

Deportivo La Coruña (Spain)	2–0	(Turkey) Galatasaray
Víctor 40'; Djalminha 73' (pen.)	Report

Estadio Riazor, A Coruña
Attendance: 24,055
Referee: Hartmut Strampe (Germany)

7 March 2001
20:45

Galatasaray (Turkey)	2–0	(Italy) Milan
Hagi 20'; Jardel 86'	Report

Ali Sami Yen Stadium, Istanbul
Attendance: 20,950
Referee: Hellmut Krug (Germany)
7 March 2001
20:45

Deportivo La Coruña (Spain)	4–3	(France) Paris Saint-Germain
Pandiani 57', 76', 84'; Tristán 60'	Report	Okocha 29'; Leroy 43', 55'

Estadio Riazor, A Coruña
Attendance: 21,364
Referee: Urs Meier (Switzerland)

13 March 2001
20:45

Milan (Italy)	1–1	(Spain) Deportivo La Coruña
Shevchenko 86' (pen.)	Report	Djalminha 74' (pen.)

San Siro, Milan
Attendance: 70,103
Referee: Hugh Dallas (Scotland)
13 March 2001
20:45

Paris Saint-Germain (France)	2–0	(Turkey) Galatasaray
Christian 3', 27'	Report

Parc des Princes, Paris
Attendance: 31,254
Referee: Vítor Melo Pereira (Portugal)

=== Group C ===
Pos	Team	Pld	W	D	L	GF	GA	GD	Pts	Qualification	BAY	ARS	LYO	SPM
1	(Germany) Bayern Munich	6	4	1	1	8	5	+3	13	Advance to knockout stage	—	1–0	1–0	1–0
2	(England) Arsenal	6	2	2	2	6	8	−2	8	Advance to knockout stage	2–2	—	1–1	1–0
3	(France) Lyon	6	2	2	2	8	4	+4	8		3–0	0–1	—	3–0
4	(Russia) Spartak Moscow	6	1	1	4	5	10	−5	4		0–3	4–1	1–1	—

Source: UEFA
22 November 2000
18:00

Spartak Moscow (Russia)	4–1	(England) Arsenal
Marcão 29', 51'; Titov 77'; Robson 82'	Report	Sylvinho 2'

Luzhniki Stadium, Moscow
Attendance: 74,000
Referee: Pierluigi Collina (Italy)
22 November 2000
20:45

Bayern Munich (Germany)	1–0	(France) Lyon
Jeremies 55'	Report

Olympiastadion, Munich
Attendance: 18,000
Referee: José García-Aranda (Spain)

5 December 2000
20:45

Lyon (France)	3–0	(Russia) Spartak Moscow
Marlet 2'; Anderson 31', 42'	Report

Stade de Gerland, Lyon
Attendance: 38,404
Referee: Juan Fernández Marin (Spain)
5 December 2000
20:45

Arsenal (England)	2–2	(Germany) Bayern Munich
Henry 4'; Kanu 55'	Report	Tarnat 56'; Scholl 66'

Highbury, London
Attendance: 35,318
Referee: Stefano Braschi (Italy)

13 February 2001
20:45

Lyon (France)	0–1	(England) Arsenal
	Report	Henry 59'

Stade de Gerland, Lyon
Attendance: 39,514
Referee: Urs Meier (Switzerland)
13 February 2001
20:45

Bayern Munich (Germany)	1–0	(Russia) Spartak Moscow
Élber 79'	Report

Olympiastadion, Munich
Attendance: 31,000
Referee: Knud Erik Fisker (Denmark)

21 February 2001
18:00

Spartak Moscow (Russia)	0–3	(Germany) Bayern Munich
	Report	Scholl 17', 75' (pen.); Paulo Sérgio 87'

Luzhniki Stadium, Moscow
Attendance: 65,000
Referee: Antonio López Nieto (Spain)
21 February 2001
20:45

Arsenal (England)	1–1	(France) Lyon
Bergkamp 33'	Report	Edmílson 90'

Highbury, London
Attendance: 34,303
Referee: Ľuboš Micheľ (Slovakia)

6 March 2001
20:45

Lyon (France)	3–0	(Germany) Bayern Munich
Govou 13', 20'; Laigle 71'	Report

Stade de Gerland, Lyon
Attendance: 39,458
Referee: Dick Jol (Netherlands)
6 March 2001
20:45

Arsenal (England)	1–0	(Russia) Spartak Moscow
Henry 82'	Report

Highbury, London
Attendance: 35,196
Referee: Rune Pedersen (Norway)

14 March 2001
18:55

Spartak Moscow (Russia)	1–1	(France) Lyon
Parfenov 4' (pen.)	Report	Anderson 68' (pen.)

Luzhniki Stadium, Moscow
Attendance: 8,500
Referee: Kyros Vassaras (Greece)
14 March 2001
18:55

Bayern Munich (Germany)	1–0	(England) Arsenal
Élber 10'	Report

Olympiastadion, Munich
Attendance: 58,000
Referee: Anders Frisk (Sweden)

=== Group D ===
Pos	Team	Pld	W	D	L	GF	GA	GD	Pts	Qualification	RMA	LEE	AND	LAZ
1	(Spain) Real Madrid	6	4	1	1	14	9	+5	13	Advance to knockout stage	—	3–2	4–1	3–2
2	(England) Leeds United	6	3	1	2	12	10	+2	10	Advance to knockout stage	0–2	—	2–1	3–3
3	(Belgium) Anderlecht	6	2	0	4	7	12	−5	6		2–0	1–4	—	1–0
4	(Italy) Lazio	6	1	2	3	9	11	−2	5		2–2	0–1	2–1	—

Source: UEFA
22 November 2000
20:45

Anderlecht (Belgium)	1–0	(Italy) Lazio
Radzinski 83'	Report

Constant Vanden Stock Stadium, Brussels
Attendance: 21,631
Referee: Ľuboš Micheľ (Slovakia)
22 November 2000
20:45

Leeds United (England)	0–2	(Spain) Real Madrid
	Report	Hierro 66'; Raúl 68'

Elland Road, Leeds
Attendance: 36,794
Referee: Dick Jol (Netherlands)

5 December 2000
20:45

Lazio (Italy)	0–1	(England) Leeds United
	Report	Smith 80'

Stadio Olimpico, Rome
Attendance: 26,503
Referee: Claude Colombo (France)
5 December 2000
20:45

Real Madrid (Spain)	4–1	(Belgium) Anderlecht
Morientes 12'; Figo 23' (pen.); Helguera 44'; Roberto Carlos 73'	Report	Stoica 89'

Santiago Bernabéu, Madrid
Attendance: 54,700
Referee: Hugh Dallas (Scotland)

13 February 2001
20:45

Real Madrid (Spain)	3–2	(Italy) Lazio
Morientes 32'; Helguera 82'; Figo 89' (pen.)	Report	Crespo 4'; Gottardi 84'

Santiago Bernabéu, Madrid
Attendance: 72,500
Referee: Gilles Veissière (France)
13 February 2001
20:45

Leeds United (England)	2–1	(Belgium) Anderlecht
Harte 74'; Bowyer 87'	Report	Stoica 65'

Elland Road, Leeds
Attendance: 36,064
Referee: Karl-Erik Nilsson (Sweden)

21 February 2001
20:45

Lazio (Italy)	2–2	(Spain) Real Madrid
Nedvěd 4'; Crespo 53'	Report	Solari 32'; Raúl 73'

Stadio Olimpico, Rome
Attendance: 50,223
Referee: Vítor Melo Pereira (Portugal)
21 February 2001
20:45

Anderlecht (Belgium)	1–4	(England) Leeds United
Koller 76'	Report	Smith 13', 38'; Viduka 34'; Harte 81' (pen.)

Constant Vanden Stock Stadium, Brussels
Attendance: 22,630
Referee: Rune Pedersen (Norway)

6 March 2001
20:45

Lazio (Italy)	2–1	(Belgium) Anderlecht
López 40'; Baronio 77'	Report	Stoica 49'

Stadio Olimpico, Rome
Attendance: 8,368
Referee: Juan Fernández Marin (Spain)
6 March 2001
20:45

Real Madrid (Spain)	3–2	(England) Leeds United
Raúl 7', 60'; Figo 41'	Report	Smith 6'; Viduka 54'

Santiago Bernabéu, Madrid
Attendance: 52,000
Referee: Ryszard Wójcik (Poland)

14 March 2001
20:45

Leeds United (England)	3–3	(Italy) Lazio
Bowyer 28'; Wilcox 43'; Viduka 62'	Report	Ravanelli 21'; Mihajlović 29' (pen.), 90+3'

Elland Road, Leeds
Attendance: 36,741
Referee: Konrad Plautz (Austria)
14 March 2001
20:45

Anderlecht (Belgium)	2–0	(Spain) Real Madrid
Dindane 85'; Goor 90+3'	Report

Constant Vanden Stock Stadium, Brussels
Attendance: 22,000
Referee: Alain Sars (France)
