= Gaizka Mendieta =

Spanish footballer (born 1974)

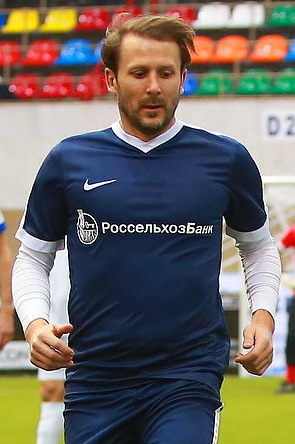
- Mendieta in a charity match in 2018

Personal information
- Full name: Gaizka Mendieta Zabala
- Date of birth: 27 March 1974 (age 52)
- Place of birth: Bilbao, Spain
- Height: 1.73 m (5 ft 8 in)
- Position: Midfielder

Youth career
- Castellón

Senior career*
Years	Team	Apps	(Gls)
1992	Castellón	16	(0)
1992–1994	Valencia B	34	(4)
1993–2001	Valencia	230	(44)
2001–2004	Lazio	20	(0)
2002–2003	→ Barcelona (loan)	33	(4)
2003–2004	→ Middlesbrough (loan)	31	(2)
2004–2008	Middlesbrough	31	(2)
Total		395	(56)

International career
1991	Spain U18	5	(0)
1993	Spain U20	3	(0)
1992–1996	Spain U21	13	(0)
1996	Spain U23	2	(0)
1999–2002	Spain	40	(8)
1998–2007	Basque Country	6	(1)
Medal record
Men's football
Representing Spain
UEFA European Under-21 Championship
Runner-up	1996 Spain
Bronze medal – third place	1994 France
- * Club domestic league appearances and goals

Gaizka Mendieta Zabala (Spanish pronunciation: [ˈgajθka menˈdjeta θaˈβala], Basque: [gais̻ka mendieta s̻aβala]; born 27 March 1974) is a Spanish former professional footballer who played as a midfielder.

A versatile player, with good technique, offensive capabilities and tackling skills, who was capable of creating goals both for his teammates and himself, he played mainly for Valencia, where he won three titles as well as reaching the final of the Champions League in 2000 and 2001 (being voted European Midfielder of the Season in both years), and finished his career with Middlesbrough in England. Over the course of ten seasons, he amassed La Liga totals of 263 games and 48 goals.

Mendieta played 40 times for Spain, appearing for the country at Euro 2000 and the 2002 World Cup.

== Club career ==
=== Valencia ===
Born in Bilbao, Basque Country, Mendieta made his professional debut at just 17 with CD Castellón in the Segunda División, featuring mostly as a full-back.

After just one season he moved to La Liga after signing with Valencia CF for 30 million pesetas, but spent the vast majority of his first year with the reserves, making his first-team debut on 13 June 1993 against Cádiz CF; he played 34 of 42 games during 1995–96 as the latter finished second, their best result since 1990.

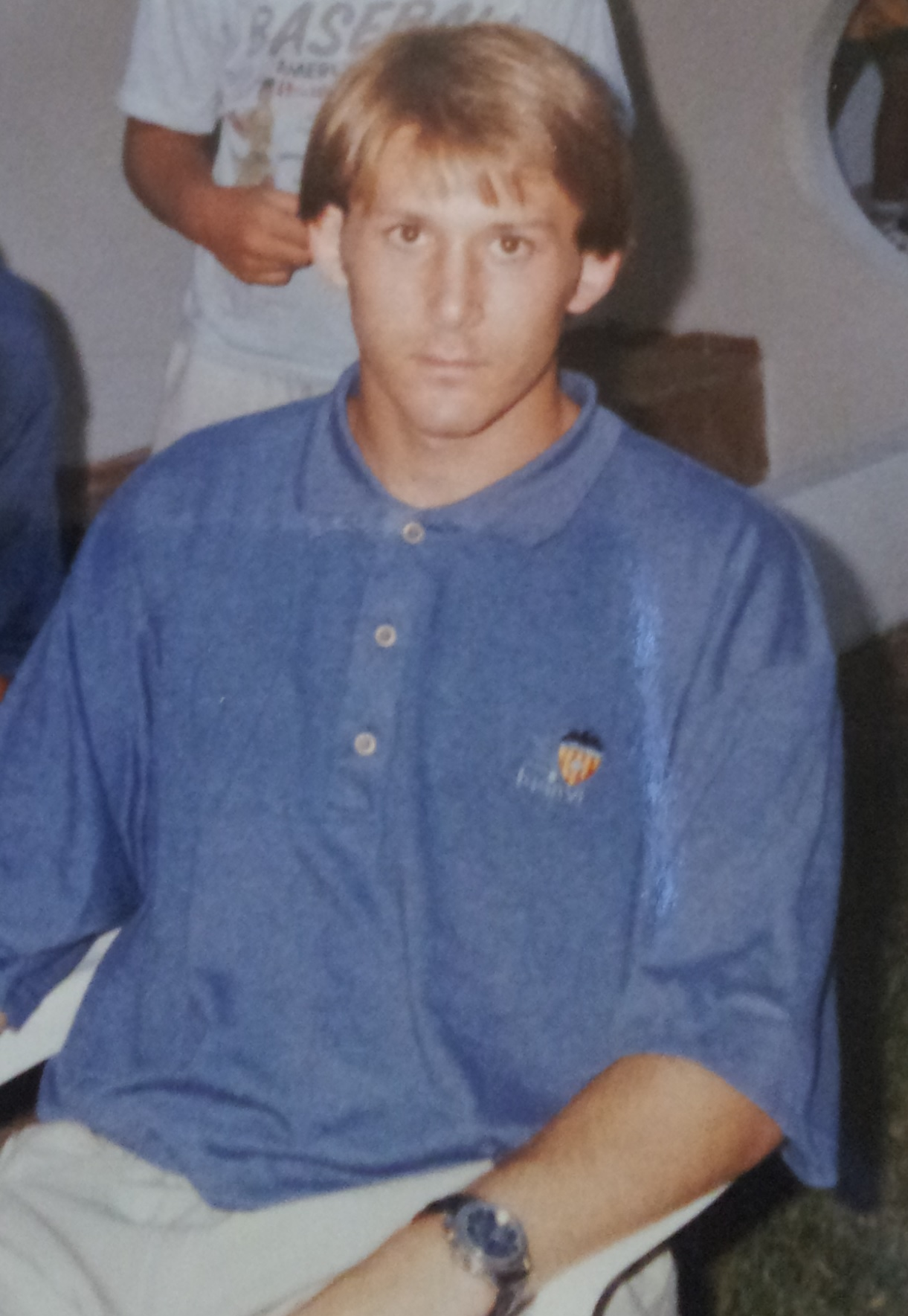
Mendieta in 1995

The 1997–98 campaign was Mendieta's breakthrough season, under new manager Claudio Ranieri. Moving to a central midfield role he played 30 league matches and scored ten goals, soon making his debut for the national team. In June 1999 he won his first trophy with the club, beating Atlético Madrid in the Copa del Rey; he found the net in wins over Levante UD, FC Barcelona (both legs) and Real Madrid during the run to the final, where he scored a memorable goal: controlling a cross on his chest, he flicked the ball over his own head and two defenders before turning to volley past the goalkeeper.

Mendieta had an even better year in 1999–2000, with Héctor Cúper now as the coach. He helped Valencia to beat Barcelona 4–3 on aggregate to win the Supercopa de España, and netted a career-best 13 goals on the domestic front as the Che finished third. However, their biggest triumph of the season was to reach the final of the UEFA Champions League, a 3–0 loss to fellow Spaniards Real Madrid; later, he was awarded the "European Midfielder of the Season" award.

Valencia went to the final of the Champions League the following year and lost it again, this time to FC Bayern Munich after a penalty shootout. Mendieta scored an early penalty in normal time to give his team a 1–0 lead, and also converted his attempt in the shootout, being again named "UEFA Best Midfielder of the Year".

=== Moving abroad ===
Mendieta was one of the most sought-after players in the 2001 off-season, eventually earning a €47.7 million transfer (or a reported 8 billion pesetas) to Italian club SS Lazio, being at the time the sixth most expensive player of all time. However, he disappointed in Serie A, spending only one year in Rome while failing to match the performances of departed playmakers Pavel Nedvěd and Juan Sebastián Verón.

Mendieta was loaned to Barcelona for the 2002–03 season– he started most of the fixtures, but the Catalans could only finish sixth– and subsequently he moved to Middlesbrough, choosing the Premier League club over offers from his homeland (Atlético Madrid and Athletic Bilbao) due to a desire to play in England.

=== Middlesbrough ===
In his first season at Middlesbrough, Mendieta was part of the side that won the Football League Cup, bringing the Teesside club its first ever silverware. In July 2004, the move was made permanent with no transfer fee involved.

In his last two years, a string of injuries (including one which caused him to miss the 2006 UEFA Cup final) and long spells of regaining match fitness relegated Mendieta to the substitutes bench. He fell out of favour with manager Gareth Southgate, who made it clear that the player no longer featured in his plans. Reports suggested that Real Sociedad, Athletic Bilbao and Málaga CF were interested in purchasing the midfielder in the January 2007 transfer window. However, no concrete agreement was ever made, and the transfer deadline passed amid speculation that the player was set for a move to Los Angeles Galaxy; towards its end, he was quoted to have said that he would fight for his place at Middlesbrough. A day later, Boro's chief executive Keith Lamb disregarded his comments saying that there was "no chance" of him featuring in the first team. He played his last game on 26 December 2006, against Everton.

On 5 December 2007, according to a Spanish newspaper, Mendieta announced his retirement from professional football when his Middlesbrough contract expired at the end of the 2007–08 campaign, He was finally released on 13 May 2008, ending a successful 17-year professional career.

Mendieta said in an interview with the BBC on 3 November 2009 that he might be interested in football management: "A part of me can see the excitement and challenge of being a manager, definitely". After retiring, he settled with his family near Middlesbrough, in Yarm.

== International career ==
In March/May 1996, Mendieta was part of the Spain under-21 team which were runners-up in the UEFA European Championship. He made his senior debut on 27 March 1999, coming on as a substitute for Juan Carlos Valerón in a 9–0 rout of Austria for UEFA Euro 2000's qualifying stages; he was included in the list of 22 for the competition in Belgium and the Netherlands, helping the national side to reach the last eight.

Despite his form slump at Lazio, Mendieta was picked for the squad at the 2002 FIFA World Cup, scoring one goal in three matches for the eventual quarter-finalists, against South Africa (3–2 win). The last of his 40 caps was earned in a friendly with Bulgaria in Granada, four months after the World Cup.

Mendieta also featured and scored for the unofficial Basque Country regional team.

== Media ==
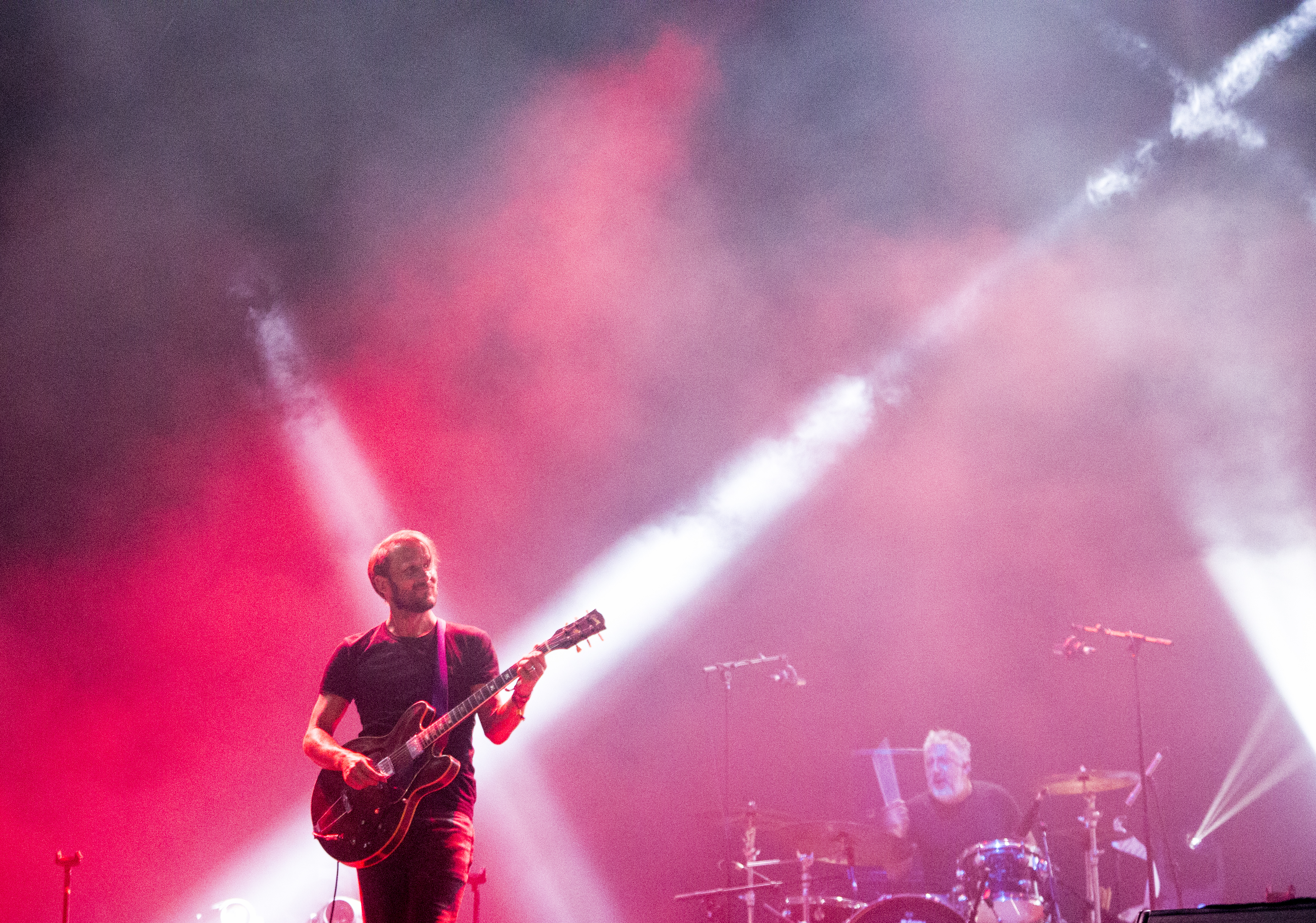
Mendieta at a concert (FIB, 2015)

Mendieta was sponsored by sportswear company Nike, and appeared in commercials for the brand. In a global advertising campaign in the run-up to the 2002 World Cup in South Korea and Japan, he starred in a "Secret Tournament" commercial (branded "Scorpion KO") directed by Terry Gilliam, appearing alongside footballers such as Luís Figo, Thierry Henry, Hidetoshi Nakata, Roberto Carlos, Ronaldinho, Ronaldo and Francesco Totti, with former player Eric Cantona the tournament "referee".

Mendieta also worked as a pundit on Premier Sports and Sky Sports' UK television coverage of Spanish football.

== Personal life ==
Mendieta's father Andrés was also a footballer who played as a goalkeeper. Originally from Lekeitio, Biscay, he spent his final years as a player at Castellón and later worked on the club's staff, raising his family in the region. Thus, Gaizka emerged through their youth system despite his Basque birthplace.

Fellow Bilbao-born Spain internationals Ander Herrera and Roberto Ríos had similar origins, learning their skills in the cities where their footballing fathers (Pedro and Eusebio respectively) were based professionally. However, both later signed for Athletic Bilbao, while Mendieta never featured for a Basque club; he and his father both represented Spain at the Olympic Games tournament, the latter in 1968 and the former in 1996.

Mendieta was a talented athlete as a youth and came close to pursuing middle-distance running as a career over football. He was a fan of music, and in particular had a passion for DJing; he also appeared on-stage at the Benicàssim festival in 2015 during a set by the band Los Planetas, whose song "Un buen día" referenced him in its lyrics.

Mendieta stated that Ruud Gullit was his footballing hero as an adolescent, due to the Dutchman's unconventional style.

== Career statistics ==
=== Club ===
Appearances and goals by club, season and competition
Club	Season	League			National cup		League cup		Continental		Total	
Club	Season	Division	Apps	Goals	Apps	Goals	Apps	Goals	Apps	Goals	Apps	Goals
Castellón	1991–92	Segunda División	16	0	0	0	—		0	0	16	0
Valencia	1992–93	La Liga	2	0	0	0	—		0	0	2	0
Valencia	1993–94	La Liga	20	2	0	0	—		0	0	20	2
Valencia	1994–95	La Liga	13	1	3	0	—		—		16	1
Valencia	1995–96	La Liga	34	0	8	0	—		—		42	0
Valencia	1996–97	La Liga	30	1	0	0	—		6	0	36	1
Valencia	1997–98	La Liga	30	10	5	0	—		—		35	10
Valencia	1998–99	La Liga	37	7	7	5	—		10	0	54	12
Valencia	1999–2000	La Liga	33	13	2	1	—		16	5	51	19
Valencia	2000–01	La Liga	31	10	0	0	—		16	4	47	14
Valencia	Total		230	44	25	6	0	0	48	9	303	59
Lazio	2001–02	Serie A	20	0	4	0	—		7	0	31	0
Barcelona (loan)	2002–03	La Liga	33	4	1	0	—		13	2	47	6
Middlesbrough (loan)	2003–04	Premier League	31	2	1	0	6	1	0	0	38	3
Middlesbrough	2004–05	Premier League	7	0	0	0	0	0	1	0	8	0
Middlesbrough	2005–06	Premier League	17	2	6	1	0	0	6	0	29	3
Middlesbrough	2006–07	Premier League	7	0	0	0	1	0	0	0	8	0
Middlesbrough	Total		31	2	6	1	1	0	7	0	45	3
Career total			361	52	37	7	7	1	75	11	480	71

=== International ===
Appearances and goals by national team and year
National team	Year	Apps	Goals
Spain	1999	9	1
Spain	2000	13	3
Spain	2001	8	3
Spain	2002	10	1
Total		40	8

Scores and results list Spain's goal tally first, score column indicates score after each Mendieta goal.

List of international goals scored by Gaizka Mendieta
No.	Date	Venue	Opponent	Score	Result	Competition
1	5 June 1999	El Madrigal, Villarreal, Spain	San Marino	9–0	9–0	UEFA Euro 2000 qualifying
2	7 June 2000	Josy Barthel, Luxembourg, Luxembourg	Luxembourg	1–0	1–0	Friendly
3	21 June 2000	Jan Breydel, Bruges, Belgium	FR Yugoslavia	3–3	4–3	UEFA Euro 2000
4	25 June 2000	Jan Breydel, Bruges, Belgium	France	1–1	1–2	UEFA Euro 2000
5	24 March 2001	José Rico Pérez, Alicante, Spain	Liechtenstein	4–0	5–0	2002 FIFA World Cup qualification
6	24 March 2001	José Rico Pérez, Alicante, Spain	Liechtenstein	5–0	5–0	2002 FIFA World Cup qualification
7	1 September 2001	Mestalla, Valencia, Spain	Austria	4–0	4–0	2002 FIFA World Cup qualification
8	12 June 2002	Daegu World Cup, Daegu, South Korea	South Africa	2–1	3–2	2002 FIFA World Cup

== Honours ==
Valencia

- Copa del Rey: 1998–99
- Supercopa de España: 1999
- UEFA Intertoto Cup: 1998
- UEFA Champions League runner-up: 1999–2000, 2000–01

Middlesbrough

- Football League Cup: 2003–04
- UEFA Cup runner-up: 2005–06

Spain U21

- UEFA European Under-21 Championship runner-up: 1996; third place: 1994

Individual

- UEFA Club Football Awards: Best Midfielder 1999–2000, 2000–01
- ESM Team of the Season: 2000–01
