= Dick Jol =

Dutch football referee (born 1956)

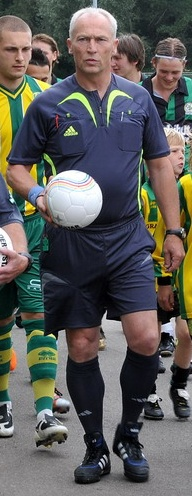
Dick Jol

Dick Jol (born 29 March 1956) is a Dutch former football referee, best known for supervising three matches during the 2000 UEFA European Football Championship held in Belgium and the Netherlands.

== Early life ==
Born in Scheveningen, South Holland, Jol started as a footballer. A forward, played several matches for NEC Nijmegen in the Dutch league, before moving on to Belgium where he played for the teams SC Menen, Berchem Sport and KV Kortrijk.

== Career ==
Jol was the referee of the 2000 FIFA Club World Championship final between Corinthians and Vasco da Gama. He was the referee in charge of the friendly International match between the Republic of Ireland and England at Lansdowne Road in 1995, which was abandoned due to violent disorder from England supporters. He officiated his first international A-match in 1993 and his last official match in 2001, when he reached the FIFA age limit of 45. Jol was assigned the 2001 UEFA Champions League Final between Bayern Munich and Valencia, in which he awarded three penalties during the 90 minutes before the outcome was eventually decided via a shootout.

Preceded by No previous competition	FIFA Club World Championship final match referees 2000 (Netherlands) Dick Jol	Succeeded by (Mexico) Benito Archundia
Preceded by UEFA Champions League Final 2000 (Italy) Stefano Braschi	UEFA Champions League Final Referees; 2001 (Netherlands) Dick Jol	Succeeded by UEFA Champions League Final 2002 (Switzerland) Urs Meier
