= 2001–02 Valencia CF season =

Valencia
2001–02 season
- President: Jaime Ortí
- Manager: Rafael Benítez
- Stadium: Mestalla
- La Liga: 1st (In 2002–03 UEFA Champions League)
- UEFA Cup: Quarter-final
- Copa del Rey: First round
- Top goalscorer: Rubén Baraja (7)
- Average home league attendance: 45,211
Home colours	Away colours	Third colours

During the 2001–02 season Valencia competed in La Liga, Copa del Rey and UEFA Cup.

== Summary ==
Valencia won their first La Liga title since the 1970–71 season, in the first campaign of new trainer Rafael Benítez. The Tenerife recruit had a tough start to his job, with several dropped points and a midfield slot in the beginning of the season, culminating in a disqualification from Copa del Rey for fielding too many non-EU players. Benítez was reported to be near the sack before an away game against Espanyol. With Valencia trailing 2–0 at halftime, the resurgence of the team in the second half allowed the inexperienced coach to keep the job, and it got to be a starting point for a winning streak that eventually saw Valencia claiming the entire league, despite taking only 75 points and scoring a mere 51 goals.

With the attacking play not flowing as it was previously, the all-conquering defence improved further conceded only 29 goals, much thanks to keeper Santiago Cañizares and centre halves Mauricio Pellegrino and Roberto Ayala. Defensively minded midfielder Rubén Baraja happened to be the club top scorer with a mere seven goals, forming an effective protecting block with David Albelda.

== Squad ==
Note: Flags indicate national team as defined under FIFA eligibility rules; some limited exceptions apply. Players may hold more than one non-FIFA nationality.

No.	Pos.	Nation	Player
1	GK	ESP	Santiago Cañizares
2	DF	ARG	Mauricio Pellegrino
3	DF	BRA	Fábio Aurélio
4	DF	ARG	Roberto Ayala
5	DF	YUG	Miroslav Đukić
6	MF	ESP	David Albelda
7	FW	NOR	John Carew
8	MF	ESP	Rubén Baraja
9	FW	ESP	Salva
10	MF	ESP	Angulo
11	FW	ROU	Adrian Ilie
12	DF	ESP	Carlos Marchena
13	GK	ESP	Andrés Palop
14	MF	ESP	Vicente
15	DF	ITA	Amedeo Carboni

No.	Pos.	Nation	Player
16	MF	ROU	Dennis Şerban
17	FW	ESP	Juan Sánchez
18	MF	ARG	Kily González
19	MF	ESP	Francisco Rufete
20	DF	FRA	Jocelyn Angloma
21	MF	ARG	Pablo Aimar
22	MF	URU	Gonzalo de los Santos
23	DF	ESP	Curro Torres
24	FW	ESP	Mista
25	GK	ESP	David Rángel
26	MF	ESP	Jandro
31	DF	ESP	David Navarro
34	DF	ESP	Javier Garrido Ramírez
27	MF	PAR	Ángel Amarilla

=== Transfers ===
In
Pos.	Name	from	Type
FW	Salva	Atletico Madrid	€10.80 million
DF	Curro Torres	Tenerife	loan ended
DF	Carlos Marchena	Benfica	Free
DF	David Navarro	Valencia Mestalla	
MF	Francisco Rufete	Malaga	€7.75 million
MF	Gonzalo de los Santos	Malaga	€15.00 million
MF	Dennis Șerban	Elche	
FW	Mista	Tenerife	loan ended

Out
Pos.	Name	To	Type
MF	Gaizka Mendieta	Lazio	€48.0 million
MF	Didier Deschamps		retired
DF	Joachim Björklund	Venezia	€4.0 million
MF	Luis Milla		retired
MF	Zlatko Zahovic	Benfica	Free
FW	Diego Alonso	Atletico Madrid	loan

== Competitions ==
=== La Liga ===
==== League table ====
Pos	Team	Pld	W	D	L	GF	GA	GD	Pts	Qualification or relegation
1	Valencia (C)	38	21	12	5	51	27	+24	75	Qualification for the Champions League group stage
2	Deportivo La Coruña	38	20	8	10	65	41	+24	68	Qualification for the Champions League group stage
3	Real Madrid (Note: Real Madrid qualified directly for the 2002–03 UEFA Champions League as holders.)	38	19	9	10	69	44	+25	66	Qualification for the Champions League group stage
4	Barcelona	38	18	10	10	65	37	+28	64	Qualification for the Champions League third qualifying round
5	Celta Vigo	38	16	12	10	64	46	+18	60	Qualification for the UEFA Cup first round

Source: LFP
Rules for classification: 1st points; 2nd head-to-head points; 3rd head-to-head goal difference; 4th head-to-head goals scored; 5th goal difference; 6th number of goals scored; 7th Fair-play points
(C) Champions

==== Results by round ====
Round	1	2	3	4	5	6	7	8	9	10	11	12	13	14	15	16	17	18	19	20	21	22	23	24	25	26	27	28	29	30	31	32	33	34	35	36	37	38
Ground	A	H	A	H	A	H	A	H	A	H	A	H	A	H	H	A	H	A	H	H	A	H	A	H	A	H	A	H	A	H	A	H	A	A	H	A	H	A
Result	W	D	W	D	D	D	W	D	W	D	W	D	D	L	D	L	W	W	W	L	L	W	W	W	D	D	W	W	W	L	W	W	W	D	W	W	W	W
Position	10	7	3	6	7	9	6	5	4	5	2	3	4	5	7	8	8	7	3	5	7	4	3	1	2	1	1	1	1	2	2	2	2	1	1	1	1	1

Source: Competitive Matches
A = Away; H = Home; W = Win; D = Draw; L = Loss; = Leader, 2002-03 UEFA Champions League group stage; = 2002-03 UEFA Champions League group stage; = 2002-03 UEFA Champions League qualifying round; = 2002-03 UEFA Cup; = 2002-03 Segunda Division

==== Matches ====
25 August 2001 1	Valencia	1–0	Real Madrid	Valencia
	Angulo 8'			Stadium: Mestalla; Referee: Antonio Jesús López Nieto

9 September 2001 2	Valladolid	1–1	Valencia
	Caminero 30'		Salva 90'	Referee: Miguel Ángel Pérez Lasa

16 September 2001 3	Valencia	1–0	Las Palmas	Valencia
	Albelda 62'			Stadium: Mestalla; Referee: Jesús Téllez Sánchez

23 September 2001 4	Athletic	2–2	Valencia
	Etxeberría 64'; Carlos García 90'		Ayala 44'; Aimar 47'	Referee: Manuel Mejuto González

30 September 2001 5	Valencia	0–0	Alavés	Valencia
				Stadium: Mestalla; Referee: Bernardino González Vázquez

4 October 2001 6	Celta	1–1	Valencia
	Maurice 48'		Juan Sánchez 6'	Referee: Fernando Carmona Méndez

7 October 2001 7	Valencia	1–0	Villarreal	Valencia
	Salva 45'			Stadium: Mestalla; Referee: Alfonso Pérez Burrull

14 October 2001 8	Barcelona	2–2	Valencia
	Saviola 43'; Gabri 74'		Salva 26'; Marchena 72'	Referee: Alberto Undiano Mallenco

21 October 2001 9	Valencia	2–0	Zaragoza	Valencia
	González 32', 80'			Stadium: Mestalla; Referee: Antonio Llonch Andreu

28 October 2001 10	Sevilla	1–1	Valencia
	Moisés 46'		Albelda 20'	Referee: Miguel Ángel Pérez Lasa

4 November 2001 11	Valencia	2–1	Rayo	Valencia
	Salva 22'; Juan Sánchez 88'		Peragón 40' (pen.)	Stadium: Mestalla; Referee: José Javier Losantos Omar

11 November 2001 12	Osasuna	0–0	Valencia
				Referee: Luis Medina Cantalejo

18 November 2001 13	Valencia	0–0	Tenerife	Valencia
				Stadium: Mestalla; Referee: Alfonso Pino Zamorano

25 November 2001 14	Real Sociedad	2–0	Valencia
	Jankauskas 38', 65' (pen.)			Referee: Javier Turienzo Álvarez

1 December 2001 15	Valencia	1–1	Mallorca	Valencia
	Mista 80'		Luque 13'	Stadium: Mestalla; Referee: César Muñiz Fernández

9 December 2001 16	Deportivo	1–0	Valencia
	Tristán 59'			Referee: Rafael Ramírez Domínguez

15 December 2001 17	Espanyol	2–3	Valencia
	Palencia 24'; Alex Fernández 44'		Rufete 59', 63'; Ilie 66'	Referee: Bernardino González Vázquez

22 December 2001 18	Valencia	2–1	Málaga	Valencia
	Vicente 25'; Mista 30'		Silva 14'	Stadium: Mestalla; Referee: Arturo Daudén Ibáñez

6 January 2002 19	Betis	1–3	Valencia
	Capi 43'		Salva 8'; Ilie 16'; Baraja 80' (pen.)	Referee: Carlos Megía Dávila

13 January 2002 20	Real Madrid	1–0	Valencia
	Morientes 72'			Referee: Alfonso Pérez Pérez

20 January 2002 21	Valencia	1–2	Valladolid	Valencia
	Pellegrino 26'		Luis García 20'; Sales 35'	Stadium: Mestalla; Referee: José Javier Losantos Omar

26 January 2002 22	Las Palmas	0–1	Valencia
			Mista 7'	Referee: Luis Medina Cantalejo

3 February 2002 23	Valencia	2–1	Athletic	Valencia
	Mista 14'; Rufete 66'		Etxeberría 73'	Stadium: Mestalla; Referee: Rafael Ramírez Domínguez

6 February 2002 24	Alavés	1–2	Valencia
	Astudillo 2'		de los Santos 3'; Carew 27'	Referee: Evaristo Puentes Leira

9 February 2002 25	Valencia	0–0	Celta	Valencia
				Stadium: Mestalla; Referee: Julián Rodríguez Santiago

16 February 2002 26	Villarreal	1–1	Valencia
	Arruabarrena 54'		Aimar 83'	Referee: Enrique Téllez Sánchez

23 February 2002 27	Valencia	2–0	Barcelona	Valencia
	Rufete 16'; Aimar 63'			Stadium: Mestalla; Referee: Antonio Jesús López Nieto

3 March 2002 28	Zaragoza	0–1	Valencia
			Rufete 24'	Referee: Miguel Ángel Pérez Lasa

10 March 2002 29	Valencia	2–0	Sevilla	Valencia
	Juan Sánchez 66'; Angulo 89'			Stadium: Mestalla; Referee: César Muñiz Fernández

17 March 2002 30	Rayo	2–1	Valencia
	Pellegrino 45' (o.g.); Corino 58'		Angulo 29'	Referee: Javier Turienzo Álvarez

24 March 2002 31	Valencia	2–1	Osasuna	Valencia
	Juan Sánchez 78'; Baraja 90'		Aloisi 85'	Stadium: Mestalla; Referee: Víctor Esquinas Torres

30 March 2002 32	Tenerife	0–1	Valencia
			Aimar 77'	Referee: Arturo Daudén Ibáñez

7 April 2002 33	Valencia	4–0	Real Sociedad	Valencia
	Baraja 12'; González 28'; Angulo 55'; Mista 89'			Stadium: Mestalla; Referee: Antonio Carmona Méndez

13 April 2002 34	Mallorca	1–1	Valencia
	Luque 45'		Baraja 63'	Referee: Rafael Ramírez Domínguez

21 April 2002 35	Valencia	1–0	Deportivo	Valencia
	Duscher 69' (o.g.)			Stadium: Mestalla; Referee: Manuel Mejuto González

27 April 2002 36	Valencia	2–1	Espanyol	Valencia
	Baraja 68', 79'		Tamudo 30' (pen.)	Stadium: Mestalla; Referee: Luis Medina Cantalejo

5 May 2002 37	Málaga	0–2	Valencia
			Ayala 35'; Fábio Aurélio 45'	Referee: Alfonso Pérez Burrull

11 May 2002 38	Valencia	2–0	Betis	Valencia
	Baraja 44'; Vicente 90'			Stadium: Mestalla; Referee: Jesús Téllez Sánchez

=== UEFA Cup ===
==== Quarter-finals ====
14 March 2002	Internazionale (Italy)	1–1	(Spain) Valencia	San Siro, Milan
21:00	Materazzi 50'	Report	Rufete 66'	Attendance: 24,184; Referee: Markus Merk (Germany)

21 March 2002	Valencia (Spain)	0–1	(Italy) Internazionale	Estadio Mestalla, Valencia
21:45		Report	Ventola 4'	Attendance: 50,000; Referee: Claude Colombo (France)

== Statistics ==
=== Players statistics ===
No.	Pos	Nat	Player	Total		La Liga		Copa del Rey		UEFA Cup	
No.	Pos	Nat	Player	Apps	Goals	Apps	Goals	Apps	Goals	Apps	Goals
1	GK	(Spain) ESP	Cañizares	40	-26	32	-23	1	0	7	-3
23	DF	(Spain) ESP	Curro Torres	45	0	34	0	1	0	10	0
2	DF	(Argentina) ARG	Pellegrino	38	1	30	1	1	0	7	0
4	DF	(Argentina) ARG	Ayala	37	2	29	2	0+1	0	7	0
15	DF	(Italy) ITA	Carboni	43	0	32+1	0	1	0	9	0
21	MF	(Argentina) ARG	Aimar	40	6	23+10	4	0+1	0	6	2
19	MF	(Spain) ESP	Rufete	41	8	27+6	5	1	1	6+1	2
6	MF	(Spain) ESP	Albelda	39	3	32	2	0	0	6+1	1
14	MF	(Spain) ESP	Vicente	40	3	22+9	2	1	0	5+3	1
10	FW	(Spain) ESP	Angulo	31	6	21+5	4	0	0	3+2	2
9	FW	(Spain) ESP	Salva	26	7	19+3	5	1	0	1+2	2
13	GK	(Spain) ESP	Palop	10	-8	6+1	-4	0	0	3	-4
18	MF	(Argentina) ARG	Kily González	32	3	15+11	3	0	0	5+1	0
8	MF	(Spain) ESP	Baraja	18	7	15+2	7	0	0	0+1	0
5	DF	(Federal Republic of Yugoslavia) YUG	Djukic	26	1	14+2	0	1	0	7+2	1
17	FW	(Spain) ESP	Sánchez	33	8	12+13	4	0	0	5+3	4
12	DF	(Spain) ESP	Marchena	22	1	12+4	1	1	0	3+2	0
22	MF	(Uruguay) URU	De los Santos	21	1	12+1	1	1	0	6+1	0
24	FW	(Spain) ESP	Mista	34	6	10+16	5	0	0	3+5	1
3	DF	(Brazil) BRA	Fábio Aurélio	19	1	6+9	1	0	0	2+2	0
7	FW	(Norway) NOR	Carew	24	1	6+9	1	1	0	6+2	0
11	FW	(Romania) ROU	Ilie	13	5	6+4	2	0	0	3	3
20	DF	(France) FRA	Angloma	4	0	2+1	0	0	0	0+1	0
31	DF	(Spain) ESP	Navarro	3	0	1+1	0	0	0	0+1	0
16	MF	(Romania) ROU	Serban	4	0	0+3	0	0+1	0		
26	MF	(Spain) ESP	Jandro	1	0	0+1	0				
25	GK	(Spain) ESP	David Rángel	0	0	0	0	0	0		
27	DF	(Paraguay) PAR	Amarilla								

- Source: https://www.bdfutbol.com/en/t/t2001-0236.html
