= 2004–05 Valencia CF season =

Valencia
2004–05 season
- President: Juan Bautista Soler
- Manager: Claudio Ranieri (from 8 June to 25 February); Antonio López (from 25 February)
- La Liga: 7th
- Copa del Rey: Round of 64
- Supercopa de España: Runners-up
- UEFA Champions League: Group stage
- UEFA Cup: Round of 32
- UEFA Super Cup: Winners
Home colours	Away colours	Third colours

The 2004–05 season was the 85th season of Valencia. The season ended with the club outside of the UEFA Cup spots. The club won the UEFA Super Cup towards the beginning of the season, but were out of the UEFA Cup spots at the end.

== Season summary ==
Popular manager Claudio Ranieri returned to Valencia for a second spell in charge after being dismissed by Chelsea. The team started well, winning the UEFA Super Cup and winning 14 points from their first six matches, but in October a strong start were cut short by heralded a run of only one win from seven games and elimination from the Champions League. Form failed to improve in 2005, with a six-match winless run and early elimination from the UEFA Cup. Ranieri was sacked in late February with the team in sixth place. Youth coach Antonio López took charge for the rest of the season, which saw Los Che finish in seventh place and thus qualifying for UEFA Intertoto Cup for next season. Getafe coach Quique Sánchez Flores was subsequently hired as the next permanent head coach.

== Players ==
=== First-team squad ===
Squad at end of season

Note: Flags indicate national team as defined under FIFA eligibility rules; some limited exceptions apply. Players may hold more than one non-FIFA nationality.

No.	Pos.	Nation	Player
1	GK	ESP	Santiago Cañizares
2	DF	PAR	Ángel Amarilla
3	DF	BRA	Fábio Aurélio
4	DF	ARG	Roberto Ayala
5	DF	ESP	Carlos Marchena
6	MF	ESP	David Albelda
7	MF	ITA	Stefano Fiore
8	MF	ESP	Rubén Baraja
9	FW	ITA	Bernardo Corradi
10	MF	ESP	Miguel Ángel Angulo
11	FW	ITA	Marco Di Vaio
12	DF	POR	Marco Caneira
13	GK	ESP	Andrés Palop
14	MF	ESP	Vicente
15	DF	ITA	Amedeo Carboni
16	MF	MLI	Mohamed Sissoko

No.	Pos.	Nation	Player
17	DF	ESP	David Navarro
18	MF	ESP	Xisco
19	MF	ESP	Francisco Rufete
20	FW	ESP	Mista
21	MF	ARG	Pablo Aimar
23	DF	ESP	Curro Torres
24	DF	ITA	Emiliano Moretti
25	GK	FRA	Ludovic Butelle
30	DF	ESP	Hector Pilán
31	MF	FRA	Nicolas Karlamoff
33	FW	ESP	Gio
34	MF	ESP	Juanlu
35	MF	ESP	Miguel Pallardó
36	DF	ESP	Santacruz
37	DF	ESP	Manuel Ruz

=== Left club during season ===
Note: Flags indicate national team as defined under FIFA eligibility rules; some limited exceptions apply. Players may hold more than one non-FIFA nationality.

No.	Pos.	Nation	Player
2	DF	ARG	Mauricio Pellegrino (to Liverpool)
22	MF	URU	Gonzalo de los Santos (on loan to Mallorca)

No.	Pos.	Nation	Player
32	MF	ESP	David Silva (on loan to Eibar)

== Competitions ==
=== La Liga ===
==== League table ====
Pos	Team	Pld	W	D	L	GF	GA	GD	Pts	Qualification or relegation
5	Espanyol	38	17	10	11	54	46	+8	61	Qualification for the UEFA Cup first round
6	Sevilla	38	17	9	12	44	41	+3	60	Qualification for the UEFA Cup first round
7	Valencia	38	14	16	8	54	39	+15	58	Qualification for the Intertoto Cup third round
8	Deportivo La Coruña	38	12	15	11	46	50	−4	51 (Note: DEP: 8 pts; ATH: 4 pts → ATH 1–0 MLG; MLG: 4 pts → MLG 1–0 ATH)	Qualification for the Intertoto Cup second round
9	Athletic Bilbao	38	14	9	15	59	54	+5	51	Qualification for the Intertoto Cup second round

Source: LFP
Rules for classification: 1st points; 2nd head-to-head points; 3rd head-to-head goal difference; 4th head-to-head goals scored; 5th goal difference; 6th number of goals scored; 7th Fair-play points

=== UEFA Super Cup ===
27 August 2004	Porto (Portugal)	1–2	(Spain) Valencia	Stade Louis II, Monaco
20:45 CEST	Quaresma 78'	Report 1 Report 2	Baraja 32'; Di Vaio 67'	Attendance: 17,292; Referee: Terje Hauge (Norway)

=== La Liga ===
==== Result round by round ====
Round	1	2	3	4	5	6	7	8	9	10	11	12	13	14	15	16	17	18	19	20	21	22	23	24	25	26	27	28	29	30	31	32	33	34	35	36	37	38
Ground	H	A	H	A	H	A	H	A	H	A	H	A	H	A	H	A	H	H	A	A	H	A	H	A	H	A	H	A	H	A	H	A	H	A	H	A	A	H
Result	W	D	W	W	W	D	L	L	D	L	D	W	W	W	W	W	W	W	D	L	D	D	L	L	W	D	L	L	W	D	D	D	W	D	L	D	D	W
Position	4	8	4	1	1	2	2	3	6	7	7	5	4	4	4	4	2	2	3	3	3	3	4	6	4	5	6	7	5	7	7	7	6	5	7	7	7	7

A = Away; H = Home; W = Win; D = Draw; L = Loss

=== UEFA Champions League ===
==== Group stage ====
14 September 2004	Valencia (Spain)	2–0	(Belgium) Anderlecht	Mestalla, Valencia
20:45	Vicente 16'; Baraja 45'	Report		Attendance: 39,000; Referee: Bertrand Layec (France)

29 September 2004	Werder Bremen (Germany)	2–1	(Spain) Valencia	Weserstadion, Bremen
20:45	Klose 60'; Charisteas 84'	Report	Vicente 2'	Referee: Mike Riley (England)

20 October 2004	Valencia (Spain)	1–5	(Italy) Internazionale	Mestalla, Valencia
20:45	Aimar 73'	Report	Stanković 47'; Vieri 49'; Van der Meyde 76'; Adriano 81'; Cruz 90+1'	Attendance: 40,000; Referee: Urs Meier (Switzerland)

2 November 2004	Internazionale (Italy)	0–0	(Spain) Valencia	San Siro, Milan
20:45		Report		Attendance: 40,000; Referee: Valentin Ivanov (Russia)

24 November 2004	Anderlecht (Belgium)	1–2	(Spain) Valencia	Constant Vanden Stock Stadium, Brussels
20:45	Wilhelmsson 24'	Report	Corradi 19'; Di Vaio 48'	Attendance: 25,866; Referee: Tom Henning Øvrebø (Norway)

7 December 2004	Valencia (Spain)	0–2	(Germany) Werder Bremen	Mestalla, Valencia
20:45		Report	Valdez 83', 90+2'	Attendance: 40,000; Referee: Anders Frisk (Sweden)

=== UEFA Cup ===
==== Round of 32 ====
16 February 2005	Valencia (Spain)	2–0	(Romania) Steaua București	Mestalla, Valencia
21:30 (CET)	Di Vaio 39'; Aimar 55'	Report		Referee: Domenico Messina (Italy)

24 February 2005	Steaua București (Romania)	2–0 (a.e.t.) (4–3 p)	(Spain) Valencia	Stadionul Steaua, Bucharest
19:00 (CET)	Cristea 50', 71'	Report		Referee: Johan Verbist (Belgium)
	Penalties
	Rădoi (penalty scored); Munteanu (penalty missed); Lovin (penalty scored); Boștină (penalty scored); Dică (penalty scored)		(penalty scored) Aimar; (penalty scored) Mista; (penalty scored) Rufete; (penalty missed) Baraja; (penalty missed) Di Vaio

2–2 on aggregate, Steaua București won 4–3 on penalty shootout.
