= 2005–06 Valencia CF season =

Valencia CF
2005-06 season
- Manager: Quique Sánchez Flores
- Stadium: Mestalla Stadium
- La Liga: 3rd
- Copa del Rey: Quarter-finals
- Intertoto Cup: Runners-up
- Top goalscorer: League: David Villa (25); All: David Villa (28)
Home colours	Away colours	Third colours

During the 2005–06 Spanish football season, Valencia CF competed in La Liga.

== Season summary ==
Valencia opened a new chapter in its history with the appointment of Spanish high-rated coach Quique Sánchez Flores, who had been successful managing Getafe. The most significant player during the season was new striker David Villa, signed from Real Zaragoza in the summer, who netted 25 goals over the full season but losing the topscoring battle of La Liga to Barcelona's Samuel Eto'o with 26 strikes, which was a near low-record. Valencia ended a league season finished 3rd place, just a single point behind Real Madrid and secured UEFA Champions League third qualifying round in the following season. To make matters worse, Valencia had endured a worst UEFA Intertoto Cup run, being beaten 1–0 later eliminated in the final UEFA Intertoto Cup by German club Hamburg and thus failed to qualify for UEFA Cup. This was only their earliest exit from European competitions for the first time.

Most notable new players also include Dutch veteran Patrick Kluivert, Spanish young defence starlet Raúl Albiol, Brazilian Edu and Juan Mora.

== First-team squad ==
Squad at end of season

Note: Flags indicate national team as defined under FIFA eligibility rules; some limited exceptions apply. Players may hold more than one non-FIFA nationality.

No.	Pos.	Nation	Player
1	GK	ESP	Santiago Cañizares
2	DF	POR	Miguel
3	DF	BRA	Fábio Aurélio
4	DF	ARG	Roberto Ayala
5	DF	ESP	Carlos Marchena
6	MF	ESP	David Albelda
7	FW	ESP	David Villa
8	MF	ESP	Rubén Baraja
9	FW	NED	Patrick Kluivert
10	MF	ESP	Miguel Ángel Angulo
11	MF	URU	Mario Regueiro
13	GK	ESP	Juan Mora
14	MF	ESP	Vicente

No.	Pos.	Nation	Player
15	DF	ITA	Amedeo Carboni
16	MF	POR	Hugo Viana
17	DF	ESP	David Navarro
18	MF	ESP	Jorge López
19	MF	ESP	Francisco Rufete
20	FW	ESP	Mista
21	MF	ARG	Pablo Aimar
22	MF	BRA	Edu (Note: Edu previously wore number 18 during the season.)
23	DF	ESP	Curro Torres
24	DF	ITA	Emiliano Moretti
25	GK	FRA	Ludovic Butelle
27	MF	ESP	Pablo Hernández
33	DF	ESP	Raúl Albiol

=== Left club during season ===
Note: Flags indicate national team as defined under FIFA eligibility rules; some limited exceptions apply. Players may hold more than one non-FIFA nationality.

No.	Pos.	Nation	Player
12	DF	POR	Marco Caneira (on loan to Sporting CP)
18	MF	URU	Gonzalo de los Santos (released)

No.	Pos.	Nation	Player
22	FW	ITA	Marco Di Vaio (on loan to AS Monaco)

== Results ==
=== La Liga ===
Pos	Team	Pld	W	D	L	GF	GA	GD	Pts	Qualification or relegation
1	Barcelona (C)	38	25	7	6	80	35	+45	82	Qualification for the Champions League group stage
2	Real Madrid	38	20	10	8	70	40	+30	70	Qualification for the Champions League group stage
3	Valencia	38	19	12	7	58	33	+25	69	Qualification for the Champions League third qualifying round
4	Osasuna	38	21	5	12	49	43	+6	68	Qualification for the Champions League third qualifying round
5	Sevilla	38	20	8	10	54	39	+15	68	Qualification for the UEFA Cup first round

Source: LFP
Rules for classification: 1st points; 2nd head-to-head points; 3rd head-to-head goal difference; 4th head-to-head goals scored; 5th goal difference; 6th number of goals scored; 7th Fair-play points
(C) Champions

=== Copa del Rey ===
==== Quarter-final ====
19 January 2006	Deportivo	1–0	Valencia	A Coruña
22:00 CET	Sergio 78' (pen.)	Report (in Spanish)		Stadium: Riazor; Attendance: 20,000; Referee: Eduardo Iturralde González (Basque Country (autonomous community))

25 January 2006; 1 February 2006	Valencia	1–1	Deportivo	Valencia
22:00 CET; 22:00 CET	Villa 43'	Report (in Spanish); Report (in Spanish)	Víctor 69' (pen.)	Stadium: Mestalla; Attendance: 32,000 / 0 Referee: Megía Dávila (Community of Madrid)

=== Intertoto Cup ===
==== Third round ====
17 July 2005	Gent (Belgium)	0–0	(Spain) Valencia	Jules Ottenstadion, Ghent
				Attendance: 9,000; Referee: Paolo Dondarini (Italy)

23 July 2005	Valencia (Spain)	2–0	(Belgium) Gent	Mestalla Stadium, Valencia
	Villa 6'; Kluivert 80'			Attendance: 17,000; Referee: Ruud Bossen (Netherlands)

Valencia won 2–0 on aggregate.

==== Semi-final ====
27 July 2005	Valencia (Spain)	4–0	(Netherlands) Roda	Mestalla Stadium, Valencia
22:00	Rufete 36', 41', 50'; Moretti 83'	Report		Attendance: 22,000; Referee: Markus Nobs (Switzerland)

3 August 2005	Roda (Netherlands)	0–0	(Spain) Valencia	Parkstad Limburg Stadion, Kerkrade
20:00		Report		Attendance: 5,000; Referee: Espen Berntsen (Norway)

Valencia won 4–0 on aggregate.

==== Final ====
9 August 2005	Hamburg (Germany)	1–0	(Spain) Valencia	AOL Arena, Hamburg
20:15	Barbarez 50'	Report		Attendance: 55,386; Referee: Stuart Dougal (Scotland)

23 August 2005	Valencia (Spain)	0–0	(Germany) Hamburg	Mestalla Stadium, Valencia
22:00		Report		Attendance: 40,000; Referee: Laurent Duhamel (France)

Hamburg won 1–0 on aggregate.
