= 2007–08 Valencia CF season =

Valencia CF
2007-08 season
- Manager: Quique Sánchez Flores until 29 October 2007; Óscar Fernández from 29 Oct. to 4 Nov.; Ronald Koeman from 5 Nov. to 21 April 2008; Voro from 21 April to end of season.
- Stadium: Mestalla Stadium
- La Liga: 10th
- Champions League: Group Stage
- Copa del Rey: Winners
- Top goalscorer: League: David Villa (18); All: David Villa (22)
Home colours	Away colours

During the 2007–08 Spanish football season, Valencia CF competed in La Liga, the Copa del Rey and the UEFA Champions League. Finally, Valencia won the Copa del Rey this season.

== Overview ==
Valencia started the season with coach Quique Sánchez Flores. Valencia's good start were cut short in early season due to slump and thus Sánchez Flores was fired for poor performance, however after his replacement, Ronald Koeman, became the new coach, the team turned to be worse. Koeman did not use Santiago Cañizares, Miguel Ángel Angulo nor David Albelda, which resulted into many affairs out of the playground. Although Valencia won Copa del Rey as a consolation prize, Koeman was fired for his bad performance in La Liga. Voro, who was born in Valencia and played for Valencia in his career, took the place of Koeman and helped the team to avoid relegation to the Second Division with four wins and one loss.

== Section by manager ==
=== Quique Sánchez Flores ===
On 29 October 2007, the Valencia board of directors fired Sánchez Flores after a string of average results with poor performances, including a 3–0 defeat at Sevilla followed by a second successive loss in the UEFA Champions League.

=== Óscar Fernández ===
In 2007, Valencia fired coach Sánchez Flores and replaced him with Fernández as interim head coach. After his last game with Valencia when the beat Mallorca 2–0 with 2 goals from Fernando Morientes, after the match he said, "I am very happy. I want to dedicate this victory to the fans of Valencia who have suffered, they deserves everything. Alexis also and above all to the team. They are football players committed to the cause and I thank them. As for the match, the team has been extraordinary and my defense has been composed by Morentin and Timo Hildebrand. Manuel Fernandes has helped the team, in defense and is the one to praise. As for Alexis, you may have some injury, but until Monday, we cannot say anything."

After that game Fernández was sacked and went to manage the B team for new first-team coach Ronald Koeman.

=== Ronald Koeman ===
On 31 October 2007, Koeman agreed to be the new coach of Valencia after the sacking of Sánchez Flores, effective 5 November 2007. With Valencia, he won the Copa del Rey, a tournament he previously won as a player with Barcelona. This was Valencia's first Copa del Rey title since 1999. However, the remainder of his tenure at Valencia would prove disappointing: the team would slump to 15th in the league, only two points above the relegation zone, as well as finishing bottom of their Champions League group. A 5–1 defeat by Athletic Bilbao would prove the final straw for Koeman's time with Valencia. He was sacked the following day, on 21 April 2008.

=== Voro ===
On 21 April 2008, after several years working with Valencia as match delegate, Voro became manager of his former team following the sacking of Koeman. After having guided his team to its Copa del Rey victory, however, he was replaced by Unai Emery for the 2008–09 season and reinstated in his previous post.

== Squad ==
Note: Flags indicate national team as defined under FIFA eligibility rules; some limited exceptions apply. Players may hold more than one non-FIFA nationality.

No.	Pos.	Nation	Player
1	GK	ESP	Santiago Cañizares
2	MF	NGA	Sunny
3	MF	NED	Hedwiges Maduro
4	DF	ESP	Raúl Albiol
5	DF	ESP	Carlos Marchena
6	MF	ESP	David Albelda (captain)
7	FW	ESP	David Villa
8	MF	ESP	Rubén Baraja
9	FW	ESP	Fernando Morientes
10	FW	ESP	Miguel Ángel Angulo
11	MF	ARG	Éver Banega
12	DF	POR	Marco Caneira
13	GK	GER	Timo Hildebrand

No.	Pos.	Nation	Player
14	MF	ESP	Vicente
15	MF	ESP	Iván Helguera
16	MF	ESP	Juan Mata
17	MF	ESP	Joaquín
18	FW	SRB	Nikola Žigić
19	FW	ESP	Javier Arizmendi
20	DF	ESP	Alexis
21	MF	ESP	David Silva
22	MF	BRA	Edu
23	DF	POR	Miguel Brito
24	DF	ITA	Emiliano Moretti
25	GK	ESP	Juan Mora
34	MF	ESP	Ángel Montoro

== Competitions ==
=== La Liga ===
==== Top goalscorers ====
David Villa scored 18 goals, two of which were penalties, and ranked fourth (tied with Real Madrid's Raúl with 18 goals) in La Liga's goalscoring table. (Daniel Güiza won the Pichichi Trophy with 27 goals.) Villa scored on hat-trick, on 11 May 2008 against Levante.

==== Matches ====
Match day 38, Valencia 3:1 Atlético Madrid
Georgios Seitaridis 11' 1:0
David Villa 40' 2:0
David Villa 55' 3:0
Sergio Agüero 76' 3:1

==== League table ====
Pos	Team	Pld	W	D	L	GF	GA	GD	Pts	Qualification or relegation
8	Almería	38	14	10	14	42	45	−3	52 (Note: DEP 0–3 ALM; ALM 1–0 DEP)	
9	Deportivo La Coruña	38	15	7	16	46	47	−1	52	Qualification for the Intertoto Cup third round
10	Valencia	38	15	6	17	48	62	−14	51	Qualification for the UEFA Cup first round (Note: Valencia entered UEFA Cup as winners of 2007–08 Copa del Rey.)
11	Athletic Bilbao	38	13	11	14	40	43	−3	50	
12	Espanyol	38	13	9	16	43	53	−10	48	

Source: LFP
Rules for classification: 1st points; 2nd head-to-head points; 3rd head-to-head goal difference; 4th head-to-head goals scored; 5th goal difference; 6th number of goals scored; 7th Fair-play points

=== Copa del Rey ===
The Final was held at the Estadio Vicente Calderón in Madrid, in which Valencia CF lifted the trophy for the seventh time in their history with a 3–1 victory over Getafe CF.

phrase	rival	results	scorer	match dates	other information
Round of 32	Real Unión	5:1	Joaquín * 2, Zigic; Zigic * 2	November 13, 2007; January 2, 2008	
Round of 16	Real Betis	4:2	Zigic, Vincent; Joaquín * 2	January 9, 2008; January 16, 2008	
Quarterfinals	Atlético Madrid	3:3(away goal 2:0)	Home: David Silva; Away: Juan Mata 35" 60"	January 23, 2008; January 30, 2008	Red card for Atletico's Thiago Motta in first leg match
Semifinals	Barcelona	4:3	Away(1:1): Villa 69'; Home(3:2): Baraja 17', Mata 44', Cléber Santana own goal	February 27/28 2008; March 19/20 2008	
Final	Getafe	3:1	Mata 4', Alexis 11', Morientes 84'	April 16, 2008	

This is the 7th title that Valencia won in Copa del Rey. Žigić, Joaquín and Mata are top goalscorers of the team in this Cup with 4 goals.

=== UEFA Champions League ===
==== Third qualifying round ====
Valencia beat Sweden's Elfsborg 5–1. The first leg result was 3–0 and the second leg 2–1. In the first leg at Mestalla, David Villa's shot was only parried by Johan Wiland and Vicente pounced on the rebound. The other goals were headers by David Silva and Fernando Morientes both from Joaquín's crosses. In the second leg, Helguera scored when unmarked with just five minutes on the clock. Elfsborg battled bravely, and Alexandersson found the net on half an hour. Villa scored for Valencia in the final seconds to win 5–1 on aggregate and qualify for the Champions League Group stage.

==== Group Stage in Group B ====
Pos	Team	Pld	W	D	L	GF	GA	GD	Pts	Qualification	CHE	SCH	ROS	VAL
1	(England) Chelsea	6	3	3	0	9	2	+7	12	Advance to knockout stage	—	2–0	1–1	0–0
2	(Germany) Schalke 04	6	2	2	2	5	4	+1	8	Advance to knockout stage	0–0	—	3–1	0–1
3	(Norway) Rosenborg	6	2	1	3	6	10	−4	7	Transfer to UEFA Cup	0–4	0–2	—	2–0
4	(Spain) Valencia	6	1	2	3	2	6	−4	5		1–2	0–0	0–2	—

Source: RSSSF

Only two goals in group stage. The away goal is by David Villa in the first match. Villa stole the ball in goalkeeper's hands with right foot against Schalke 04 and this match is the only victory in group stage. The only goal in Mestalla is by Villa as well. Villa scored early at about ten minutes of the Match against Chelsea. Valencia was reversed by Cole and Drogba's goals. Valencia scored no goals in four games later.
