= Juan Luis Mora (footballer, born 1973) =

Spanish footballer

Personal information
- Full name: Juan Luis Mora Palacios
- Date of birth: 12 July 1973 (age 53)
- Place of birth: Aranjuez, Spain
- Height: 1.85 m (6 ft 1 in)
- Position: Goalkeeper

Youth career
- Aranjuez

Senior career*
Years	Team	Apps	(Gls)
1992–1993	Aranjuez	19	(0)
1993–1994	Oviedo B	21	(0)
1994–1999	Oviedo	126	(0)
1999–2002	Espanyol	71	(0)
2002–2003	Xerez	41	(0)
2003–2005	Levante	78	(0)
2005–2008	Valencia	3	(0)
2008–2010	Levante	12	(0)
Total		371	(0)

International career
1994–1996	Spain U21	15	(0)
1996	Spain U23	4	(0)
Medal record
Men's football
Representing Spain
UEFA European Under-21 Championship
Runner-up	1996 Spain
- * Club domestic league appearances and goals

Juan Luis Mora Palacios (born 12 July 1973) is a Spanish former professional footballer who played as a goalkeeper.

He appeared in 238 La Liga games over 13 seasons, mostly with Oviedo. He represented Spain at youth level.

== Club career ==
Born in Aranjuez, Community of Madrid, Mora made his professional debut with Real Oviedo during 1993–94, and was the undisputed first-choice for the following three seasons. He signed for RCD Espanyol in 1999, then spent 2002–03 and the following campaign in Segunda División with Xerez CD and Levante UD respectively.

Mora played all 38 league matches in 2004–05's top flight with Levante, as his team was relegated in the last matchday. He subsequently joined Valencia CF on a three-year deal, being third choice behind Santiago Cañizares and Ludovic Butelle first and Cañizares and Timo Hildebrand afterwards (Cañizares was axed from the squad in December 2007, but reinstated in April following Ronald Koeman's firing), appearing in only three La Liga games during his spell; he left the Mestalla Stadium after his contract expired, at the end of the 2007–08 season.

On 15 August 2008, the 35-year-old Mora returned to Levante, recently relegated to the second division. He served as backup in his debut campaign, and took part in no competitive matches whatsoever in the second as the Valencian Community side returned to the top tier after a two-year absence; he retired shortly after, remaining with the club in directorial capacities.

== International career ==
Mora appeared for the Spanish under-21s in the 1996 UEFA European Championship, and played Olympic football the same year.

== Career statistics ==
Appearances and goals by club, season and competition
Club	Season	League			Cup		Europe		Other		Total	
Club	Season	Division	Apps	Goals	Apps	Goals	Apps	Goals	Apps	Goals	Apps	Goals
Aranjuez	1992–93	Segunda División B	19	0	6	0	—		—		25	0
Oviedo B	1993–94	Segunda División B	21	0	—		—		—		21	0
Oviedo	1993–94	La Liga	5	0	1	0	—		—		5	0
Oviedo	1994–95	La Liga	37	0	0	0	—		—		37	0
Oviedo	1995–96	La Liga	38	0	4	0	—		—		42	0
Oviedo	1996–97	La Liga	38	0	0	0	—		—		38	0
Oviedo	1997–98	La Liga	7	0	1	0	—		—		8	0
Oviedo	1998–99	La Liga	1	0	2	0	—		0	0	3	0
Oviedo	Total		126	0	8	0	—		0	0	134	0
Espanyol	1999–2000	La Liga	13	0	6	0	—		—		19	0
Espanyol	2000–01	La Liga	35	0	0	0	5	0	2	0	42	0
Espanyol	2001–02	La Liga	23	0	1	0	—		—		24	0
Espanyol	Total		71	0	7	0	5	0	2	0	85	0
Xerez	2002–03	Segunda División	41	0	3	0	—		—		44	0
Levante	2003–04	Segunda División	40	0	0	0	—		—		40	0
Levante	2004–05	La Liga	38	0	0	0	—		—		38	0
Levante	Total		78	0	0	0	—		—		78	0
Valencia	2005–06	La Liga	1	0	1	0	1	0	—		3	0
Valencia	2006–07	La Liga	0	0	0	0	0	0	—		0	0
Valencia	2007–08	La Liga	2	0	1	0	0	0	—		3	0
Valencia	Total		3	0	2	0	1	0	—		6	0
Levante	2008–09	Segunda División	12	0	0	0	—		—		12	0
Levante	2009–10	La Liga	0	0	0	0	—		—		0	0
Levante	Total		12	0	0	0	—		—		12	0
Career total			371	0	26	0	6	0	2	0	405	0

== Honours ==
Espanyol

- Copa del Rey: 1999–2000

Levante

- Segunda División: 2003–04

Valencia

- Copa del Rey: 2007–08

Spain U21

- UEFA European Under-21 Championship runner-up: 1996
