= Rubén Baraja =

Spanish football manager (born 1975)

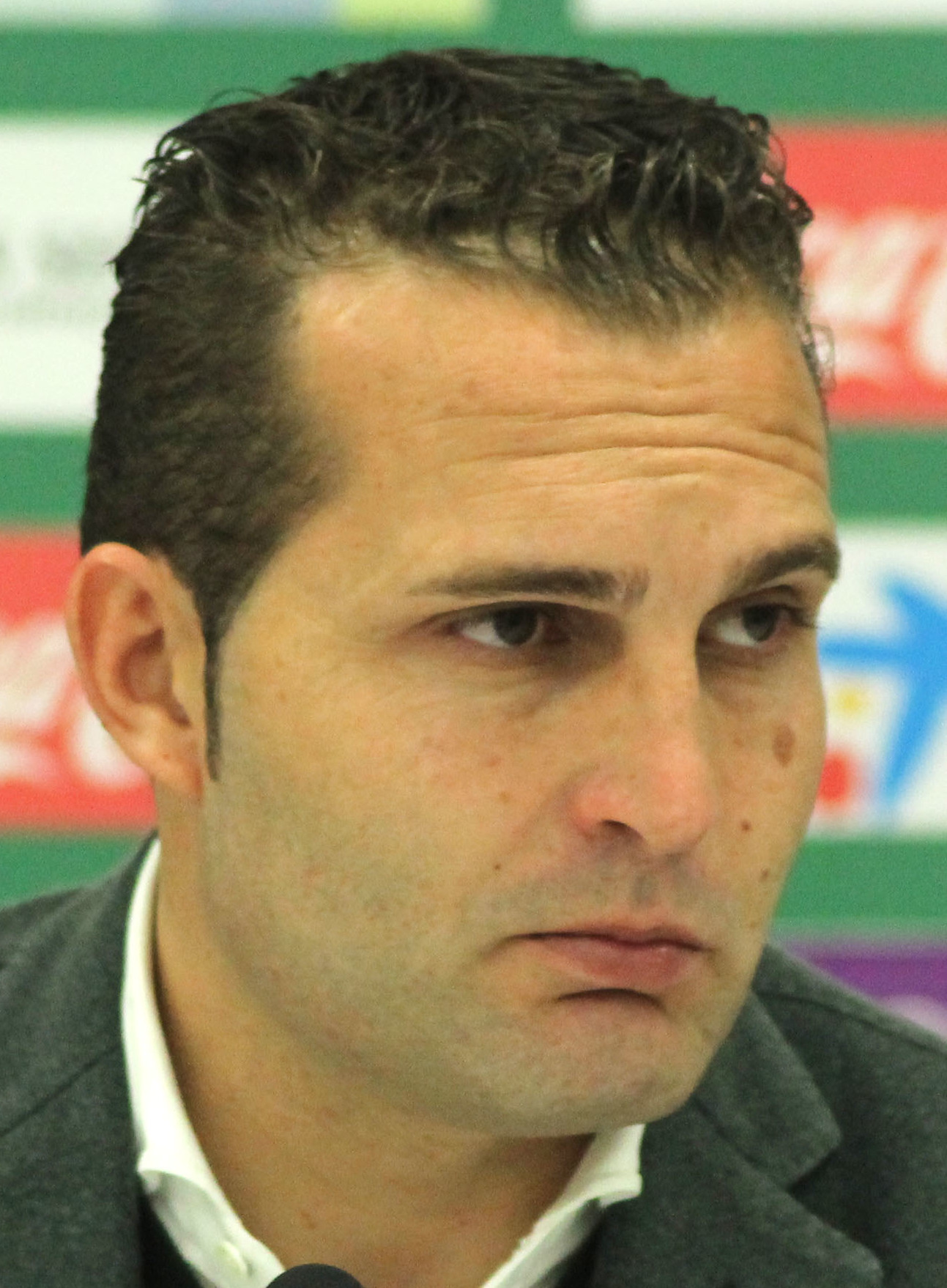
- Baraja as Elche manager in 2016

Personal information
- Full name: Rubén Baraja Vegas
- Date of birth: 11 July 1975 (age 51)
- Place of birth: Valladolid, Spain
- Height: 1.80 m (5 ft 11 in)
- Position: Central midfielder

Youth career
- Valladolid

Senior career*
Years	Team	Apps	(Gls)
1993–1995	Valladolid B	46	(11)
1993–1996	Valladolid	41	(2)
1996–1999	Atlético Madrid B	79	(20)
1999–2000	Atlético Madrid	34	(4)
2000–2010	Valencia	263	(41)
Total		463	(78)

International career
1993	Spain U18	3	(1)
2000–2005	Spain	43	(7)

Managerial career
- 2011: Atlético Madrid (assistant)
- 2013–2015: Valencia (youth)
- 2013: Valencia B (interim)
- 2015–2016: Elche
- 2016–2017: Rayo Vallecano
- 2017–2018: Sporting Gijón
- 2019–2020: Tenerife
- 2020: Zaragoza
- 2023–2024: Valencia
- * Club domestic league appearances and goals

Rubén Baraja Vegas (Spanish pronunciation: [ruˈβem baˈɾaxa]; born 11 July 1975) is a Spanish former professional footballer. He is currently a manager.

A complete central midfielder with tackling, passing and scoring ability, he played mostly for Valencia in a 17-year career. He won five major honours with the club, including two La Liga championships.

Baraja was also a consistent part of the Spain national team for five years, appearing for them at the 2002 World Cup and Euro 2004 and winning 43 caps. He began working as a head coach in 2015, being appointed by Valencia eight years later.

== Club career ==
Born in Valladolid, Castile and León, Baraja started his career at local Real Valladolid before moving to Atlético Madrid, where he would spend two and a half seasons with the reserves, first appearing with the first team on 7 February 1999 by playing the second half of a 2–1 away defeat against Salamanca. In 1998–99, with the B's in the Segunda División, he scored a career-best eleven goals.

When Atlético was relegated at the end of 1999–2000, Baraja left the club in a 2,000 million pesetas transfer to that year's UEFA Champions League finalists Valencia, who were looking to strengthen their central midfield following the sale of first-team players Gerard and Javier Farinós. In his first season, he was a key element in the Che's Champions League run, as they were beaten in the final for the second year running, this time losing in a penalty shootout to Bayern Munich, with the player scoring on his attempt.

2001–02 would see Baraja's first trophy win, where his goals late in the campaign helped Valencia to their first La Liga title in 31 years – he finished as team top scorer in the league, netting seven in only 17 league games after recovering from a knee injury. 2003–04 was another big year, winning both the domestic championship (with eight league goals from him) as well as the UEFA Cup, beating Marseille 2–0 in the final.

In 2006–07, Baraja only made 14 league appearances, as Valencia finished fourth, and continued to be constantly bothered by physical problems in the following years. After two respectable seasons, often partnering longtime central midfield partner David Albelda, he was again greatly troubled by injuries in the 2009–10 campaign, featuring in only 18 matches (two complete).

Baraja closed his chapter at the Mestalla Stadium after one full decade on 16 May 2010, receiving homages before and after the 1–0 home win over Tenerife and being replaced to a standing ovation in the 89th minute. The 35-year-old announced his retirement shortly after, having appeared in 338 top-flight games over 15 seasons and scored 47 goals.

== International career ==
Baraja made his debut for Spain on 7 October 2000, in the 2002 FIFA World Cup qualification 2–0 defeat of Israel. Consequently, he was picked for the final stages, where the team reached the quarter-finals before being sent out by co-hosts South Korea on penalties, though the player, as the year before with Valencia, once again scored on his attempt; he scored from a header during regulation time, but saw his goal disallowed for alleged shirt pulling and pushing in the Korean penalty area.

Baraja also took part in the disappointing UEFA Euro 2004 tournament, where Spain was eliminated in the group stage by eventual finalists Portugal and Greece. He was left out of the 2006 World Cup squad, as his club presence was also diminished due to recurrent injuries.

== Coaching career ==
=== Early years ===
In June 2011, Baraja returned to former team Atlético Madrid as part of newly appointed manager Gregorio Manzano's staff. In the summer of 2013, he returned to main club Valencia, first coaching the youths.

On 22 December 2013, Baraja took interim charge of the reserves in the Segunda División B, as Nico Estévez was doing the same for the first team, and achieved a 2–1 win at Sant Andreu.

=== Segunda División ===
Baraja was appointed manager of Elche, newly relegated to the second tier, on 12 July 2015. On 6 June of the following year, he resigned after failing to agree new terms.

On 8 November 2016, Baraja took the reins at fellow second-division Rayo Vallecano. After only three wins from 13 games, he was sacked on 20 February 2017, as they sat a point above the relegation places.

Baraja was appointed at Sporting de Gijón on 12 December 2017. Towards the end of the season, he received a four-match ban and a €3,005 fine for preventing Barcelona B's Sergi Palencia from taking a throw-in; this included the first game of the play-offs, in which eventual champions Valladolid eliminated the Asturians 5–2 on aggregate in the semi-finals.

On 18 November 2018, Baraja was dismissed after losing the Asturian derby against Real Oviedo, leaving the team in 14th position with a streak of only one win from 11 matches. In December of the following year, he became coach of Tenerife in the same league, managing to avoid relegation, but still left on 20 July 2020.

Baraja replaced Víctor Fernández at the helm of Real Zaragoza on 20 August 2020. He was relieved of his duties on 9 November, after a poor start to the season.

=== Valencia ===
On 14 February 2023, Baraja returned to his former club Valencia as head coach, taking over a team that had slipped from 14th to 18th since the dismissal of Gennaro Gattuso; long-time teammate Carlos Marchena was part of his coaching team. His first top-flight game as a manager came six days later, in a 1–0 loss at Getafe, and a 1–1 draw at Real Betis secured survival by a two-point margin on the final day. He then renewed his contract for two more years.

On 23 December 2024, having achieved only two wins during the season, Baraja was sacked.

== Personal life ==
Baraja's younger brother, Javier, was also a professional footballer. A defender, he too graduated at Valladolid, and went on to spend most of his senior career there.

== Career statistics ==
=== Club ===
Appearances and goals by club, season and competition
Club	Season	League			Cup		Continental		Other		Total	
Club	Season	Division	Apps	Goals	Apps	Goals	Apps	Goals	Apps	Goals	Apps	Goals
Valladolid B	1993–94	Segunda División B	20	8	—		—		—		20	8
Valladolid B	1994–95	Segunda División B	26	3	—		—		—		26	3
Valladolid B	Total		46	11	—		—		—		46	11
Valladolid	1993–94	La Liga	5	1	—		—		—		5	1
Valladolid	1994–95	La Liga	9	0	—		—		—		9	0
Valladolid	1995–96	La Liga	27	1	—		—		—		27	1
Valladolid	Total		41	2	—		—		—		41	2
Atlético Madrid B	1996–97	Segunda División	22	1	—		—		—		22	1
Atlético Madrid B	1997–98	Segunda División	32	8	—		—		—		32	8
Atlético Madrid B	1998–99	Segunda División	25	11	—		—		—		25	11
Atlético Madrid B	Total		79	20	—		—		—		79	20
Atlético Madrid	1998–99	La Liga	8	1	4	0	2 (Note: Appearances in UEFA Cup / UEFA Europa League)	0	—		14	1
Atlético Madrid	1999–2000	La Liga	26	3	5	2	6	2	—		37	7
Atlético Madrid	Total		34	4	9	2	8	2	—		51	8
Valencia	2000–01	La Liga	35	4	2	1	15 (Note: Appearances in UEFA Champions League)	2	—		52	7
Valencia	2001–02	La Liga	17	7	—		1	0	—		18	7
Valencia	2002–03	La Liga	35	5	1	0	12	4	2 (Note: Appearances in Supercopa de España)	0	50	9
Valencia	2003–04	La Liga	35	8	6	2	11	2	—		52	12
Valencia	2004–05	La Liga	25	7	2	0	8 (Note: Six appearances and one goal in UEFA Champions League, two appearances in UEFA Cup)	1	3 (Note: Two appearances in Supercopa de España, one appearance and one goal in UEFA Super Cup)	1	38	9
Valencia	2005–06	La Liga	31	4	2	0	1 (Note: Appearance in UEFA Intertoto Cup)	0	—		34	4
Valencia	2006–07	La Liga	14	1	1	0	3	0	—		18	1
Valencia	2007–08	La Liga	25	2	8	1	3	0	—		36	3
Valencia	2008–09	La Liga	28	3	4	1	4	1	2	0	38	5
Valencia	2009–10	La Liga	18	0	2	0	8	0	—		28	0
Valencia	Total		263	41	28	5	66	10	7	1	364	57
Career total			463	78	37	7	74	12	7	1	581	98

=== International ===
Appearances and goals by national team and year
National team	Year	Apps	Goals
Spain	2000	3	1
Spain	2001	5	1
Spain	2002	10	3
Spain	2003	10	0
Spain	2004	12	2
Spain	2005	3	0
Total		43	7

Scores and results list Spain's goal tally first, score column indicates score after each Baraja goal.

List of international goals scored by Rubén Baraja
No.	Date	Venue	Opponent	Score	Result	Competition
1	11 October 2000	Ernst Happel, Vienna, Austria	Austria	1–1	1–1	2002 World Cup qualification
2	25 April 2001	Nuevo Arcángel, Córdoba, Spain	Japan	1–0	1–0	Friendly
3	17 April 2002	Windsor Park, Belfast, Northern Ireland	Northern Ireland	2–0	5–0	Friendly
4	12 October 2002	Carlos Belmonte, Albacete, Spain	Northern Ireland	1–0	3–0	Euro 2004 qualification
5	12 October 2002	Carlos Belmonte, Albacete, Spain	Northern Ireland	3–0	3–0	Euro 2004 qualification
6	18 February 2004	Lluís Companys, Barcelona, Spain	Peru	2–1	2–1	Friendly
7	5 June 2004	Alfonso Pérez, Getafe, Spain	Andorra	2–0	4–0	Friendly

== Managerial statistics ==
As of 22 December 2024

Managerial record by team and tenure
Team	Nat	From	To	Record								Ref
Team	Nat	From	To	G	W	D	L	GF	GA	GD	Win %	Ref
Valencia B (interim)	(Spain)	15 December 2013	22 December 2013	1	1	0	0	2	1	+1	100.00	
Elche	(Spain)	12 July 2015	6 June 2016	43	13	19	11	43	49	−6	30.23	
Rayo Vallecano	(Spain)	8 November 2016	20 February 2017	13	3	4	6	12	14	−2	23.08	
Sporting Gijón	(Spain)	12 December 2017	18 November 2018	43	20	9	14	59	42	+17	46.51	
Tenerife	(Spain)	2 December 2019	20 July 2020	28	12	9	7	38	27	+11	42.86	
Zaragoza	(Spain)	20 August 2020	9 November 2020	10	2	4	4	9	9	+0	20.00	
Valencia	(Spain)	14 February 2023	23 December 2024	78	26	20	32	82	95	−13	33.33	
Total				216	77	65	74	245	237	+8	35.65	—

== Honours ==
Valencia

- La Liga: 2001–02, 2003–04
- Copa del Rey: 2007–08
- UEFA Cup: 2003–04
- UEFA Super Cup: 2004

Individual

- ESM Team of the Year: 2001–02
- UEFA Super Cup Man of the Match: 2004
