= John Carew =

Norwegian footballer (born 1979)

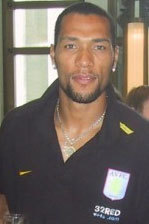
- Carew with Aston Villa in 2008

Personal information
- Full name: John Alieu Carew
- Date of birth: 5 September 1979 (age 47)
- Place of birth: Lørenskog, Akershus, Norway
- Height: 1.95 m (6 ft 5 in)
- Position: Striker

Youth career
- 1995–1997: Lørenskog

Senior career*
Years	Team	Apps	(Gls)
1997–1999	Vålerenga	43	(19)
1999–2000	Rosenborg	17	(19)
2000–2004	Valencia	84	(20)
2003–2004	→ Roma (loan)	20	(6)
2004–2005	Beşiktaş	24	(13)
2005–2007	Lyon	35	(9)
2007–2011	Aston Villa	113	(37)
2011	→ Stoke City (loan)	10	(1)
2011–2012	West Ham United	19	(2)
Total		365	(126)

International career
1995	Norway U15	7	(5)
1996	Norway U16	2	(2)
1996–1997	Norway U17	3	(1)
1997	Norway U18	5	(5)
1997–2000	Norway U21	24	(8)
1998–2011	Norway	91	(24)
- * Club domestic league appearances and goals

John Alieu Carew (born 5 September 1979) is a Norwegian actor and former professional footballer who played as a striker. He was capped 91 times and scored 24 goals for the Norway national team. At club level, he played professionally for football clubs in Norway, Spain, Italy, Turkey, France and England.

== Club career ==
=== Vålerenga ===
Carew began his career with his local club Lørenskog, a minor club in the Akershus region. He was already considered a highly talented youngster and had gained some media attention before he was acquired by Vålerenga in 1997, and in the same year Carew was a part of the team that gained promotion to Tippeligaen and won the Norwegian Football Cup. During his two-year period at the club he played 58 matches and scored 30 goals, while his profile rose even more due to his combination of strength and goal-scoring ability.

=== Rosenborg ===
During the summer of 1999, Carew joined Norwegian football's most successful club of the past decade and Champions League mainstays Rosenborg in a deal worth 23 000 000 kroner.

=== Transfer moves around Europe ===
After a string of impressive displays in the Champions League, Carew moved to Spanish club Valencia in an €8.5 million transfer, where he managed to win the La Liga title once in 2002. Carew was also part of the Valencia side that lost on penalties in the 2001 UEFA Champions League Final to Bayern Munich, though he scored his own penalty attempt. His goals in the campaign were crucial, including a 75th-minute header in a 1–0 home win against Arsenal in the second leg of the quarter-final, which saw Valencia advance to the semi-final. In the 2002–03 Champions League campaign, Carew was once again responsible for Arsenal's exit from the competition. With Valencia needing a win in their final game of the second group phase at home against Arsenal to progress to the quarter finals, Carew scored twice in a 2–1 victory. He then spent the 2003–04 season on loan at Italian side Roma where he scored 7 goals in 26 games. Carew then moved to Turkey in 2004 to play with Beşiktaş. After the 2004–05 season, he was snapped up by Lyon for €7.6 million. While Carew was playing in Europe he was constantly linked with a move to the English Premiership and several failed attempts were made to sign him. He failed a medical at Fulham in 2002 and West Bromwich Albion had a bid rejected by Valencia.

=== Aston Villa ===
==== 2006–07 season ====
On 22 January 2007, Carew signed for Aston Villa in an exchange deal with Lyon for Milan Baroš. Carew penned a three-and-a-half-year deal at the Birmingham-based club. Carew went on to receive the No. 10 jersey left vacant by Baroš' departure.

Carew made his debut in the 3–1 defeat to Newcastle United, but went on to score his first goal for the club in a 1–0 victory against West Ham United just three days later. Villa manager Martin O'Neill praised Carew's performance after the match.

==== 2007–08 season ====
Carew began the season as Villa's first-choice forward and much was expected of him by the Villa fans. However, despite some promising performances, it took Carew nearly two months to score his opener for the season against Everton in a 2–0 victory. He also suffered an injury in the same game and was out of action for six weeks with a hamstring problem. He scored on his second match back in the Villa side in a 3–0 away win against Middlesbrough in November. He then followed this up with a headed goal against Blackburn Rovers in a 4–0 victory as Aston Villa began to climb the Premiership table. December brought just one goal for Carew, a 30-yard run and shot against Manchester City, but he was instrumental in several of the goals Villa scored.

Carew scored two goals against Reading on 12 January and was unlucky not to be awarded Man of the Match which went to Martin Laursen. He scored his first hat-trick for seven years and his first ever for Aston Villa against Newcastle United on 9 February in a 4–1 win. Gareth Barry allowed him to do so by kindly relinquishing his usual penalty taking duties so Carew could score his third. On 12 April 2008, Carew scored for Aston Villa against Derby County at Pride Park in the Premier League, in the 26th minute and Villa went on to win the game 6–0. On 20 April 2008, Carew scored twice against Birmingham City in the Birmingham derby at Villa Park, which Villa went on to win 5–1. He continued his scoring run with a header the following week, in a crunch game at Everton's Goodison Park, which finished 2–2. It would be his 13th and final goal of the season, crowning him as Villa's top scorer for the 2007–08 season.

==== 2008–09 season ====
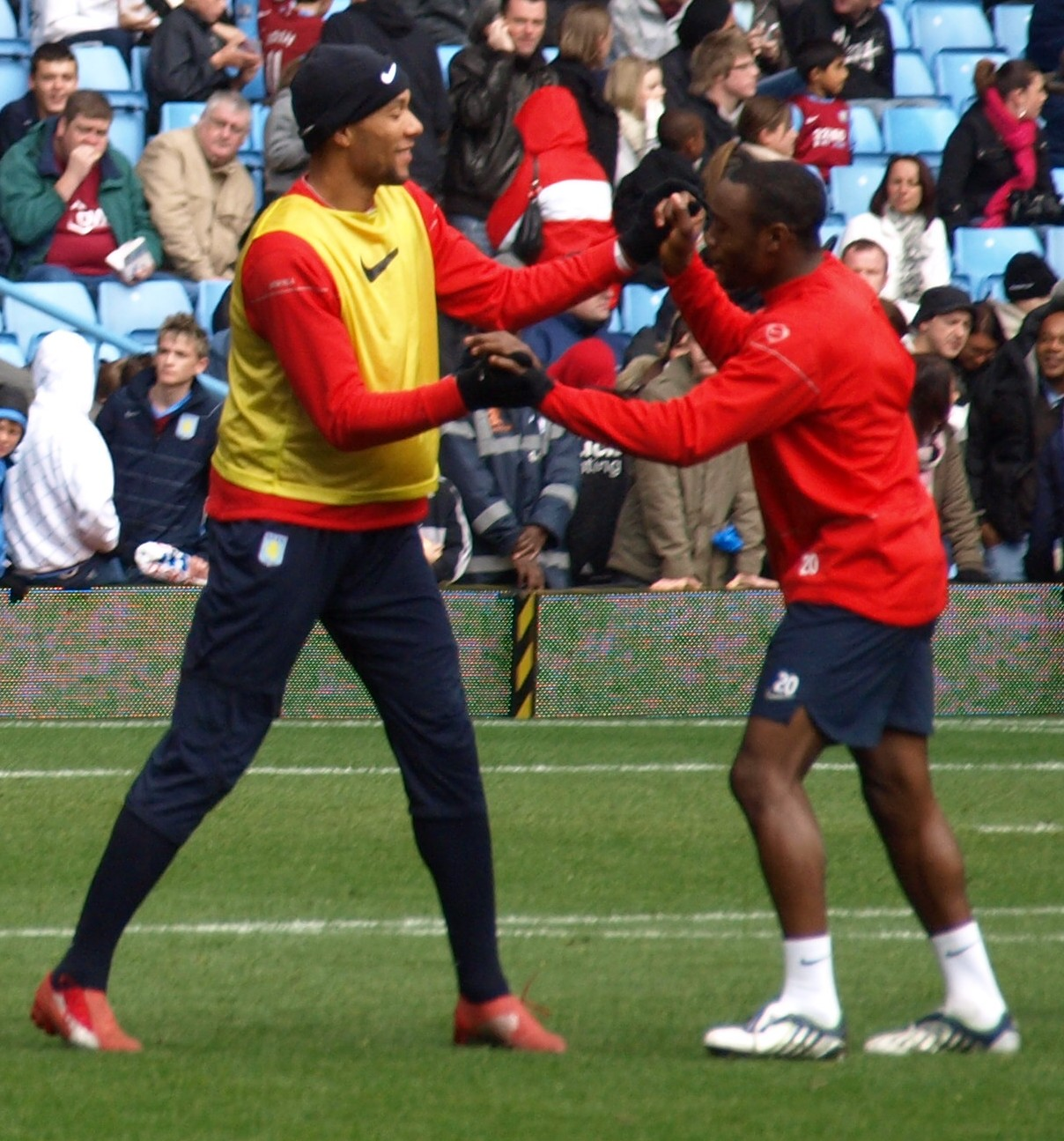
Carew at an open-training session at Villa Park with teammate Nigel Reo-Coker

Carew scored his first goal of the 2008–09 campaign by scoring the first goal in Aston Villa's 2–2 draw over Odense in the Intertoto Cup. On 14 August 2008, Carew signed a 12-month extension to his contract, thus taking him through to 2011 with his current deal.

Carew scored the opening goal in Villa's 4–2 win over Manchester City at Villa Park. He then scored his second league goal against Stoke City as they went on to lose the match 3–2 when Mamady Sidibe scored a late winner. He quickly added his 3rd of the season in the 2–1 defeat of local rivals West Bromwich Albion; and with Gabriel Agbonlahor on the scoresheet again the pair began to form a formidable partnership. They both scored again and assisted each other's goals in a 4–0 victory in the Premier League at Wigan Athletic on 26 October 2008. Carew scored the winning goal in the UEFA Cup for Villa in a Group F match away to Slavia Prague on 6 November 2008, Villa midfielder Steve Sidwell struck the ball towards goal but it hit Carew and went in, therefore the goal was credited to Carew; it turned out to be the winning goal and continued Villa's 100% record in the competition's group stages and the 1–0 victory saw Villa go to the top of the group. Carew made the headlines in late October due to his personal behaviour. He was fined two weeks wages by Martin O'Neill for being in a pub near a Birmingham lap dancing club the night before Villa's UEFA cup group stage match with Ajax.

Soon after the controversy, Carew sustained a back injury that kept him out of the side for several months. During this time, Villa boss Martin O'Neill signed England international striker Emile Heskey to fill the gap left by Carew's absence. Heskey appeared to have taken Carew's place in the starting line-up for a number of weeks. However, his own injury woes and Carew's good form on return meant the Norwegian regained his place in the side. Carew played his first game after his injury on 31 January 2009 in a goalless draw with Wigan Athletic. In the last 32 of the UEFA Cup, Carew earned Villa a first leg draw with CSKA Moscow, after going 1–0 down to Vágner Love's goal. On 1 March 2009, Carew came off the bench to score a lob-shot volley in the 2–2 draw against Stoke City in the Premier League, which was later voted the team's goal of the season. He scored an equalising goal in the away fixture against Manchester United at Old Trafford before also netting the first goal in the home tie against Everton as Villa fought back from 2–0 and 3–1 down to draw 3–3. Further goals against Hull City and Middlesbrough took his league total to an impressive 11 goals from just 25 appearances.

==== 2009–10 season ====
Due to the persistence of fellow strikers Heskey and Agbonlahor, Carew initially struggled to hold down a regular spot in the starting eleven at the beginning of the 2009–10 campaign. Nevertheless, while being used as a substitute Carew still managed to score several important goals for Aston Villa. On 7 March 2010, manager Martin O'Neill chose to include Carew in the starting eleven in an FA Cup game against Reading. He took the opportunity characteristically and scored a hat-trick as Aston Villa came from two goals behind to defeat Reading 4–2 in the FA Cup quarter final. This made Carew the competition's top scoring striker, raising questions as to why the Norwegian was rarely included in Villa's starting eleven. Carew began to feature in the Villa team once more as the season progressed; goals against Wolverhampton Wanderers, Sunderland and Chelsea helped the Norwegian go neck and neck with Gabriel Agbonlahor as the club's joint top scorers for 2009–10.

==== 2010–11 season ====
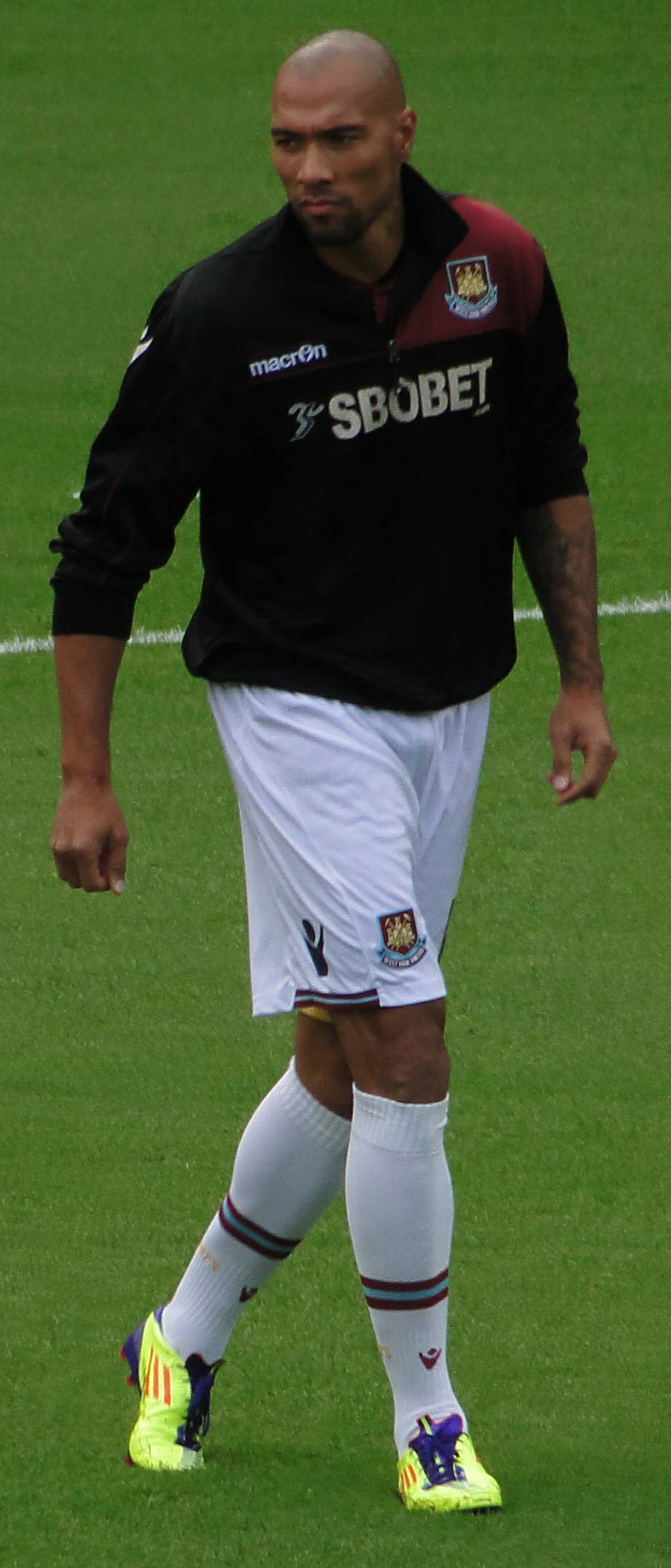
Carew warming-up for West Ham United

Due to an injury to Gabriel Agbonlahor, Carew started the new campaign upfront with support from Ashley Young. However, due to both injury concerns of his own and a loss of form, his place in the team was taken by Emile Heskey limiting him to cameo appearances from the bench. As the season progressed, Carew's first team appearances became less frequent. Later that month, he allegedly missed a Villa game due to heavy snow disrupting his travel.

Carew spoke out about his limited chances under the new system under manager Gérard Houllier to a Norwegian TV station. Despite ongoing rumors in the press about a dispute between the former Lyon pair, Houllier revealed that Carew had been left out of the Aston Villa squad to work on his fitness. However, when Villa signed Darren Bent for £18 million, Carew's first team opportunities were further reduced.

On 27 May 2011, Aston Villa announced that Carew was one of a number of players released by the club after their contracts expired.

=== Stoke City loan ===
Carew joined Stoke City on loan until the end of the 2010–11 season on 21 January 2011. Following his move Carew stated that he was looking forward to a new challenge and also revealed that he rejected offers from other clubs. His arrival was welcomed by the Stoke players including Andy Wilkinson.

"I'm looking forward to the challenge and I am happy to be here. Although I had other offers, I saw Stoke as the best team and the strongest team, so this is a great chance for me to join a side fighting in the top half of the table. The important thing now is to make the most of this opportunity"

— Carew on his decision to join Stoke on loan.

Carew made his debut for City the following day at Fulham where he came on as a substitute. He scored his first goal for Stoke in a 3–2 win against Sunderland on 5 February 2011. He followed this up by scoring in the FA Cup against Brighton & Hove Albion. However a back injury slowed his progress in a Stoke shirt. After his release from Villa, Tony Pulis did not offer Carew a contract with Stoke.

=== West Ham United ===
On 6 August 2011 Football League Championship side West Ham United announced the signing of Carew as a free agent. He scored his first goal for West Ham in a 2–2 draw with Crystal Palace on 1 October 2011. On 23 May 2012, Carew was released with five other players including Julien Faubert, Frank Nouble, Papa Bouba Diop, Abdoulaye Faye and Olly Lee. After the 2011–12 season, Carew did not get a new contract with West Ham.

In August 2012, Carew was in talks with his old club Vålerenga, but Vålerenga did not accept his demand of a wage of 600,000 kr per match. In connection with Carew's possible transfer to Vålerenga, Kjetil Siem told Dagbladet that he had signed an unofficial contract with Carew in 2005, when Siem was Director of Football in Vålerenga, that Carew would return to Vålerenga in 2012. He went on trial with Serie A team Internazionale in February 2013, but was not offered a contract as Inter were concerned over his fitness. In October 2013 Carew stated that he had retired.

== International career ==
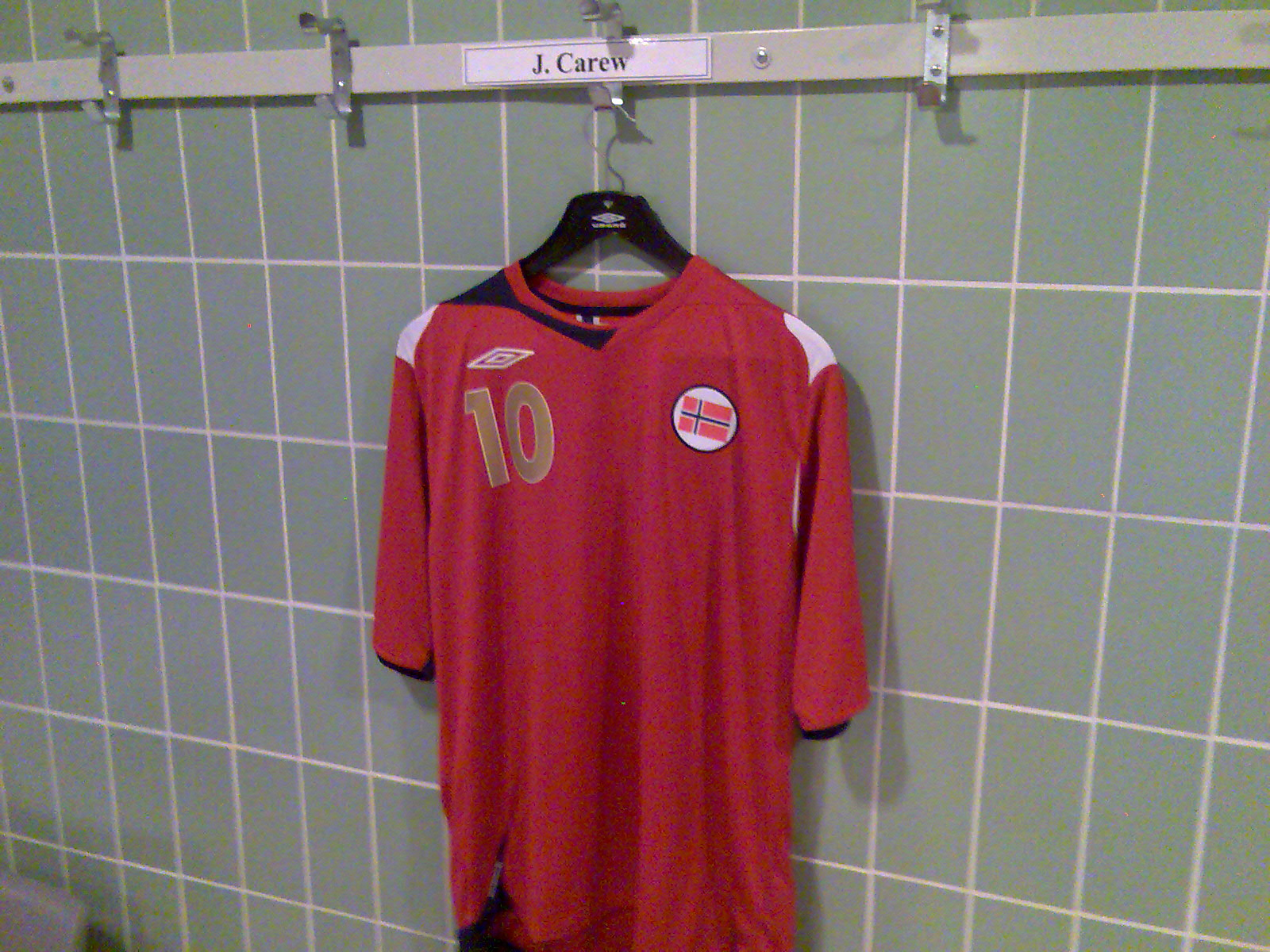
John Carew's kit at the Norway national team. From the changing room at Ullevaal Stadion

John Carew played 91 times for Norway, scoring 24 goals, and was part of their Euro 2000 squad. He made his full international debut on 18 November 1998, and was the first black player to represent Norway.

== Acting career ==
In 2014, Carew starred in his first feature film, a Canadian horror called Dead of Winter. His second film, a Norwegian-made thriller called Høvdinger, was released on 17 July 2015.

In 2018, Carew starred in the successful Norwegian TV-series, Heimebane, playing as Michael Ellingsen, an aging star footballer for a local Norwegian club.

In 2019, Carew played the role of Jungle Warrior in the Disney's dark fantasy adventure film, Maleficent: Mistress of Evil alongside Angelina Jolie, Elle Fanning and Chiwetel Ejiofor.

In 2023, Carew played the role of an early Spotify investor in the TV series The Playlist.

As of 2025, Carew stars in Netflix’s Home for Christmas as Adrian, a love interest of chief protagonist Johanne.

== Trial and conviction for tax evasion ==
In June 2020, Carew's apartment in Skillebekk, Norway was searched by the authorities investigating his tax arrangements. In 2021, Carew formally requested that the authorities register him as living in Norway; the tax authorities had requested his arrest a short time before that.

A lower court trial began in October 2022, with Carew accused of several counts of tax evasion amounting Norwegian kroner 5.4 million between 2014 and 2019. The trial lasted two weeks.

For the period of the alleged evasion, Carew claimed that he did not live in Norway (if one lives in Norway for more than 183 days in a year, then Norwegian law says that one has to pay taxes to Norway). The trial showed that Carew's debit card was, in 2014, used between 900 and 1000 times in Norway—mostly at golf courses. The prosecution showed spreadsheets which marked every day in which the government claimed that he had been in Norway, the spreadsheets indicated 259 days in 2015 and 299 days, 282 days and 289 days in other years. Further testimony showed that Carew, after his time playing for Lyon, told French tax authorities that in 2005 and 2006 he was living in Norway, when in fact he had moved from Norway in 2000 and not moved back. Carew's apartment in London was rented-out in the long-term in 2017, according to the prosecution. Furthermore, Carew's work that year was mainly in Norway.

Carew pleaded guilty to acting "grossly negligently" in regards to his taxes, but not with intent to defraud. On 16 November 2022, Carew was sentenced to 14 months in prison and a 537,268 Norwegian Kroner fine. (The maximum prison sentence for the tax evasion charges is six years—the prosecuting authority asked for two years.) In December 2022, media said that Carew will not appeal the verdict. In June 2023, media said that Carew is working as a permanent employee for the Norwegian Football Federation, or NFF; also, the justice system mandated that he [continue to] wear Electronic tagging [until his sentence has been served].

== Filmography ==
Year	Title	Role	Note	Ref
2014	Dead of Winter	Robert	Main role	
2015	Høvdinger	Igor	Main role	
2018–2019	Heimebane	Michael Ellingsen	TV series, 18 episodes	
2019	Maleficent: Mistress of Evil	Jungle Warrior Fey	Supporting role	
2022	Olsenbanden – Siste skrik!	Benny Fransen	Main role	
2022	The Playlist	Anton	TV miniseries, 1 episode	
2024	Purk	Marko	TV miniseries, 1 episode	
2024	Young Woman and the Sea	English Channel Swimmer #2	Supporting role	

== Personal life ==
Carew was born in Lørenskog, Norway to a Gambian Jola father and a Norwegian mother.

John Carew has a son born in 2004 who lives with his mother in Norway.

Carew is noted for being a practicing Christian and often makes donations to charity. He also contributes to organizations like Soccer Against Crime, MOT and Ungdom mot Vold (Youth Against Violence) and was awarded the Kniksen award as Kniksen of the year in both 2005 and 2007. Since joining Aston Villa, Carew is noted for visiting children in hospitals around Birmingham and supporting Villa's initiative to donate from the payroll towards hospital running costs.

Carew's sister, Elisabeth Carew, is an R&B singer.

In December 2010 Carew was a victim of fraud after he paid £100,000 for a Porsche Cayenne Gemballa which never arrived. In 2012 Carew was declared bankrupt following a petition by HM Revenue and Customs. The Bankruptcy Order was annulled on 4 July 2012.

== Career statistics ==
=== Club ===
Appearances and goals by club, season and competition
Club	Season	League			National cup (Note: Includes Norwegian Cup, Copa del Rey, Coppa Italia, Turkish Cup, Coupe de France, FA Cup)		League cup (Note: Includes Coupe de la Ligue, Football League Cup)		Europe		Other		Total	
Club	Season	Division	Apps	Goals	Apps	Goals	Apps	Goals	Apps	Goals	Apps	Goals	Apps	Goals
Vålerenga	1997	Norwegian First Division	10	5	4	5	—		—		—		14	10
Vålerenga	1998	Tippeligaen	18	7	0	0	—		4 (Note: Appearances in UEFA Cup Winners' Cup)	3	—		22	10
Vålerenga	1999	Tippeligaen	15	7	3	1	—		4	2	—		22	10
Vålerenga	Total		43	19	7	6	–		8	5	—		58	30
Rosenborg	1999	Tippeligaen	7	10	2	0	—		8	4	—		17	14
Rosenborg	2000	Tippeligaen	10	9	0	0	—		4	1	—		14	10
Rosenborg	Total		17	19	2	0	–		12	5	—		31	24
Valencia	2000–01	La Liga	37	11	2	0	—		18 (Note: Appearances in UEFA Champions League)	3	—		57	14
Valencia	2001–02	La Liga	15	1	1	0	—		8 (Note: Appearances in UEFA Cup)	0	—		24	1
Valencia	2002–03	La Liga	32	8	1	0	—		13	5	1 (Note: Appearance in Supercopa de España)	0	47	13
Valencia	Total		84	20	4	0	—		39	8	1	0	128	28
Roma (loan)	2003–04	Serie A	20	6	3	1	—		6	1	—		29	8
Beşiktaş	2004–05	Süper Lig	24	13	1	0	—		3	1	—		28	14
Lyon	2005–06	Ligue 1	26	8	2	0	1	0	10	4	1 (Note: Appearance in Trophée des Champions)	3	40	15
Lyon	2006–07	Ligue 1	9	1	0	0	1	0	2	1	1	0	13	2
Lyon	Total		35	9	2	0	2	0	12	5	2	3	53	17
Aston Villa	2006–07	Premier League	11	3	0	0	0	0	—		—		11	3
Aston Villa	2007–08	Premier League	32	13	1	0	0	0	—		—		33	13
Aston Villa	2008–09	Premier League	27	11	2	1	1	0	4	3	—		34	15
Aston Villa	2009–10	Premier League	33	10	5	6	3	0	1 (Note: Appearance in UEFA Europa League)	1	—		42	17
Aston Villa	2010–11	Premier League	10	0	0	0	1	0	0	0	—		11	0
Aston Villa	Total		113	37	8	7	5	0	5	4	—		131	48
Stoke City (loan)	2010–11	Premier League	10	1	3	1	0	0	—		—		13	2
West Ham United	2011–12	Championship	19	2	1	0	1	0	—		—		21	2
Career total			365	126	31	15	8	0	85	29	3	3	492	173

=== International ===
Appearances and goals by national team and year
National team	Year	Apps	Goals
Norway	1998	1	0
Norway	1999	5	1
Norway	2000	11	2
Norway	2001	9	6
Norway	2002	5	1
Norway	2003	5	0
Norway	2004	7	2
Norway	2005	9	1
Norway	2006	6	1
Norway	2007	10	6
Norway	2008	6	1
Norway	2009	8	1
Norway	2010	4	1
Norway	2011	5	1
Total		91	24

Scores and results list Norway's goal tally first, score column indicates score after each Carew goal.

List of international goals scored by John Carew
No.	Date	Venue	Opponent	Score	Result	Competition	Ref.
1	22 January 1999	HaShalom Stadium, Umm al-Fahm, Israel	Estonia	3–0	3–3	Friendly	
2	4 February 2000	La Manga Club Football Stadium, Cartagena, Spain	Sweden	1–0	1–1	Friendly	
3	3 June 2000	Ullevaal Stadion, Oslo, Norway	Italy	1–0	1–0	Friendly	
4	28 February 2001	Windsor Park, Belfast, Northern Ireland	Northern Ireland	2–0	4–0	Friendly	
5	24 March 2001	Ullevaal Stadion, Oslo, Norway	Poland	1–2	2–3	2002 FIFA World Cup qualification	
6	6 June 2001	Ullevaal Stadion, Oslo, Norway	Belarus	1–1	1–1	2002 FIFA World Cup qualification	
7	5 September 2001	Ullevaal Stadion, Oslo, Norway	Wales	2–2	3–2	2002 FIFA World Cup qualification	
8	6 October 2001	Vazgen Sargsyan Republican Stadium, Yerevan, Armenia	Armenia	2–0	4–1	2002 FIFA World Cup qualification	
9	6 October 2001	Vazgen Sargsyan Republican Stadium, Yerevan, Armenia	Armenia	4–1	4–1	2002 FIFA World Cup qualification	
10	7 September 2002	Ullevaal Stadion, Oslo, Norway	Denmark	2–2	2–2	UEFA Euro 2004 qualifying	
11	4 September 2004	Stadio Renzo Barbera, Palermo, Italy	Italy	1–0	1–2	2006 FIFA World Cup qualification	
12	13 October 2004	Ullevaal Stadion, Oslo, Norway	Slovenia	1–0	3–0	2006 FIFA World Cup qualification	
13	3 September 2005	Stadion Z'dežele, Celje, Slovenia	Slovenia	1–0	3–2	2006 FIFA World Cup qualification	
14	15 November 2006	Red Star Stadium, Belgrade, Serbia	Serbia	1–1	1–1	Friendly	
15	24 March 2007	Ullevaal Stadion, Oslo, Norway	Bosnia and Herzegovina	1–2	1–2	UEFA Euro 2008 qualifying	
16	6 June 2007	Ullevaal Stadion, Oslo, Norway	Hungary	3–0	4–0	UEFA Euro 2008 qualifying	
17	6 June 2007	Ullevaal Stadion, Oslo, Norway	Hungary	4–0	4–0	UEFA Euro 2008 qualifying	
18	22 August 2007	Ullevaal Stadion, Oslo, Norway	Argentina	1–0	2–1	Friendly	
19	22 August 2007	Ullevaal Stadion, Oslo, Norway	Argentina	2–0	2–1	Friendly	
20	12 September 2007	Ullevaal Stadion, Oslo, Norway	Greece	1–1	2–2	UEFA Euro 2008 qualifying	
21	26 March 2008	Podgorica City Stadium, Podgorica, Montenegro	Montenegro	1–3	1–3	Friendly	
22	14 November 2009	Stade de Genève, Lancy, Switzerland	Switzerland	1–0	1–0	Friendly	
23	8 October 2010	Larnaca, Cyprus	Cyprus	2–0	2–1	UEFA Euro 2012 qualifying	
24	11 October 2011	Ullevaal Stadion, Oslo, Norway	Cyprus	2–0	3–1	UEFA Euro 2012 qualifying	

== Honours ==
Vålerenga

- Norwegian Cup: 1997

Valencia

- La Liga: 2001–02
- UEFA Champions League runner-up: 2000–01

Lyon

- Ligue 1: 2005–06
- Trophée des Champions: 2005, 2006

Aston Villa

- Football League Cup runner-up: 2009–10

Stoke City

- FA Cup runner-up: 2010–11

West Ham United

- Football League Championship play-offs: 2012

Individual

- Kniksen of the Year: 2005, 2007, 2008
