= Gio (footballer, born 1984) =

Spanish footballer

Personal information
- Full name: Giovanni Pérez Rodríguez
- Date of birth: 26 May 1984 (age 42)
- Place of birth: El Cotillo, Spain
- Height: 1.71 m (5 ft 7 1/2 in)
- Position: Forward

Youth career
- Valencia

Senior career*
Years	Team	Apps	(Gls)
2003–2005	Valencia B	60	(11)
2005–2006	Alcoyano	17	(1)
2006–2007	Lleida	11	(0)
2007	Ceuta	18	(5)
2007–2008	Portuense	18	(3)
2008–2009	Fuerteventura	20	(0)
2009–2010	Manlleu	6	(3)
2010	Atlético Baleares	15	(2)
2010–2011	Burjassot	33	(8)
2011	St. Pölten	6	(0)
2012	Ontinyent	11	(1)
2012–2013	Acero	12	(0)
2013	Burjassot		
2013–2014	Pego	25	(8)
2014–2015	Gandía	31	(8)
- * Club domestic league appearances and goals

Giovanni Pérez Rodríguez (born 26 May 1984), commonly known as Gio, is a Spanish former footballer who played as a forward.

== Football career ==
Gio was born in El Cotillo, Fuerteventura, Canary Islands. After having unsuccessfully graduated from Valencia CF's youth system – he only appeared for the reserves – he went on to play the vast majority of his career in the lower leagues, representing CD Alcoyano, UE Lleida, AD Ceuta, Racing Club Portuense, UD Fuerteventura, AEC Manlleu, CD Atlético Baleares, Burjassot CF (two spells), Ontinyent CF, CD Acero, Pego CF and CF Gandía.

In the 2011 summer, Gio signed with Austrian club SKN St. Pölten for his first professional experience, but returned to his country in the immediately following transfer window.
