= David Albelda =

Spanish footballer

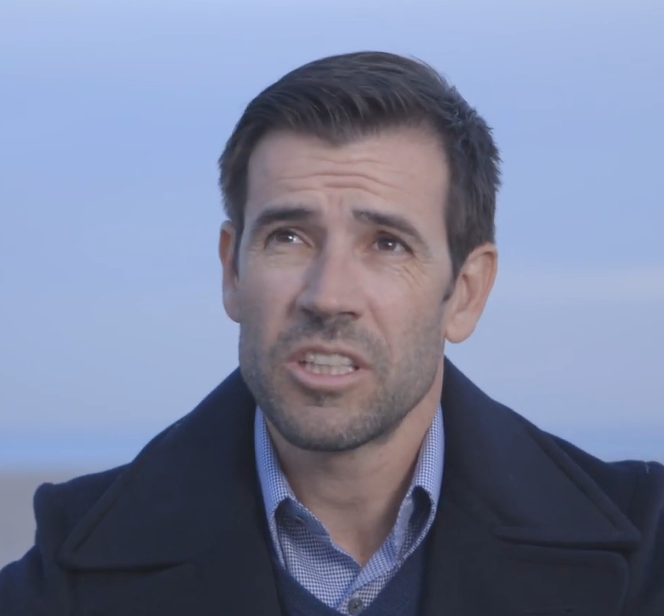
- Albelda in 2019

Personal information
- Full name: David Albelda Aliqués
- Date of birth: 1 September 1977 (age 49)
- Place of birth: La Pobla Llarga, Spain
- Height: 1.81 m (5 ft 11 in)
- Position: Defensive midfielder

Team information
- Current team: Villarreal B (manager)

Youth career
- 1992–1995: Alzira

Senior career*
Years	Team	Apps	(Gls)
1995–1996	Valencia B	31	(4)
1995–2013	Valencia	351	(6)
1996–1997	→ Villarreal (loan)	34	(0)
1998–1999	→ Villarreal (loan)	35	(2)
Total		451	(12)

International career
1996	Spain U18	8	(0)
1997	Spain U20	5	(1)
1998–2000	Spain U21	12	(1)
2000	Spain U23	6	(0)
2001–2008	Spain	51	(0)

Managerial career
- 2019–2021: Atzeneta
- 2023–2025: Villarreal C
- 2025–: Villarreal B
Medal record
Representing Spain
Men's Football
Silver medal – second place	2000 Sydney	Team competition
- * Club domestic league appearances and goals

David Albelda Aliqués (Spanish pronunciation: [daˈβið alˈβelda aliˈkes]; born 1 September 1977) is a Spanish former professional footballer who played as a defensive midfielder. He is the manager of Villarreal B.

He played mainly for Valencia during his 18-year senior career, being team captain for over a decade and appearing in 480 competitive matches. With his main club, he won five trophies including two La Liga championships and the 2004 UEFA Cup.

A Spain international in the 2000s, Albelda won 51 caps for the country, representing it in two World Cups and at Euro 2004. He later worked as a manager.

== Club career ==
Born in La Pobla Llarga, Valencian Community, Albelda started his career as a central defender with local UD Alzira and, after having served two separate loans with Villarreal CF, also in the region, returned for good to first professional club Valencia CF in the 1999–2000 season, playing a major role in a squad that was crowned La Liga champions in 2002 and 2004, adding to that the 2004 UEFA Cup; since summer 2001, with Gaizka Mendieta's departure, he was also awarded team captaincy.

Albelda, along with teammates Santiago Cañizares and Miguel Ángel Angulo was axed from the squad on 20 December 2007 by recently arrived coach Ronald Koeman; in the captain's case, he had ironically just renewed his link with the Che until 2011. In response, on 2 January 2008, Albelda's lawyer claimed that Valencia had ignored his client's plea for an amicable end to the player's contract, with legal recourse the only possible avenue left. With news of this hitting the media, several teams, although he would not be able to join any Spanish team for the remainder of the season, having played more than four league games, studied the possibility of signing him in the winter transfer window, with hopes of a free transfer.

In late April 2008, however, with Koeman's dismissal, all three were reinstated by new manager Voro in a squad seriously threatened with relegation, with five remaining rounds. He returned to action in the second half of the 6–0 away loss against FC Barcelona on 4 May, and received his first post-reinstatement start in a 5–1 victory in the derby away at Levante UD the following week, as the side mathematically retained top-flight status.

For 2008–09, Albelda remained a regular fixture alongside longtime central midfield teammate Rubén Baraja. On 10 January 2009 he delivered an outstanding performance at right-back, replacing suspended Miguel in a 3–3 home derby against Villarreal.

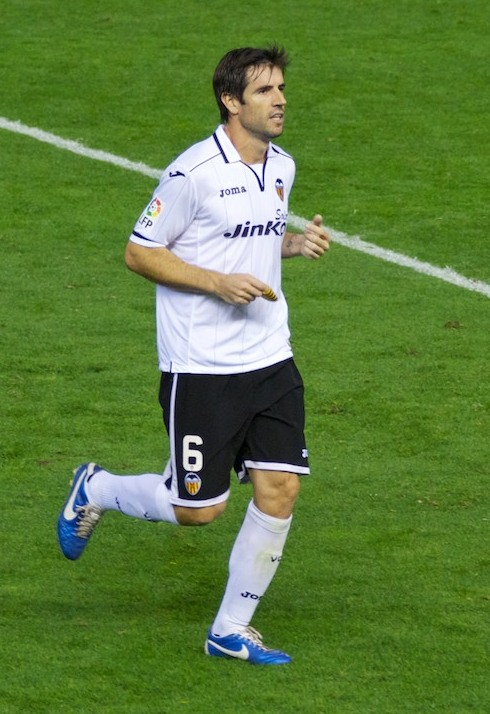
Albelda in action for Valencia in 2012

Albelda was played intermittently by Valencia from 2010 to 2013, also suffering several injury problems. On 10 June 2013, it was announced that the 35-year-old would not renew his contract with the club, leaving as a free agent; he announced his retirement two months later.

== International career ==
A Spanish international since 5 September 2001, in 2–0 away win against Liechtenstein for the 2002 FIFA World Cup qualifiers, Albelda was part of the Spanish squad in the 2002 and 2006 FIFA World Cups. He also played in UEFA Euro 2004.

After having been ousted from the Valencia squad, Albelda would still be called by national team boss Luis Aragonés to a 6 February 2008 friendly with France. He would eventually not make the final cut for Euro 2008, as Spain emerged victorious.

Albelda also won a silver medal at the 2000 Summer Olympics in Sydney, and represented his nation at the 1997 FIFA World Youth Championship.

== Coaching career ==
On 29 May 2019, Albelda was appointed manager of Tercera División side Atzeneta UE. He led them to their first-ever promotion to Segunda División B on 26 July 2020, after beating CD Alcoyano in the play-offs.

On 24 May 2021, after being immediately relegated, Albelda left the club. He returned to Villarreal in December 2023, being put in charge of the C team in the Tercera Federación.

On 29 May 2025, Albelda replaced longtime incumbent Miguel Álvarez at the helm of the reserves in Primera Federación.

== Personal life ==
Albelda married Spanish model and presenter Vicen Fernández in 2007.

== Career statistics ==
=== Club ===
Appearances and goals by club, season and competition
Club	Season	League			Cup		Europe		Other		Total	
Club	Season	Division	Apps	Goals	Apps	Goals	Apps	Goals	Apps	Goals	Apps	Goals
Valencia B	1995–96	Segunda División B	31	4	–		–		5 (Note: Appearances in Segunda División B play-offs)	1	36	5
Valencia	1997–98	La Liga	5	0	0	0	–		–		5	0
Valencia	1999–2000	La Liga	21	0	1	0	11	0	2 (Note: Appearances in Supercopa de España)	1	35	1
Valencia	2000–01	La Liga	21	0	0	0	13	0	–		34	0
Valencia	2001–02	La Liga	32	2	0	0	7	1	–		39	3
Valencia	2002–03	La Liga	26	0	0	0	11	0	–		37	0
Valencia	2003–04	La Liga	33	1	3	0	8	1	–		44	2
Valencia	2004–05	La Liga	28	0	1	0	6	0	3 (Note: Two appearances in Supercopa de España; one appearance in UEFA Super Cup)	0	38	0
Valencia	2005–06	La Liga	32	2	3	0	5	0	–		40	2
Valencia	2006–07	La Liga	25	0	2	0	7	0	–		34	0
Valencia	2007–08	La Liga	15	0	0	0	6	0	–		21	0
Valencia	2008–09	La Liga	30	0	3	0	5	0	2	0	40	0
Valencia	2009–10	La Liga	28	1	1	0	6	0	–		35	1
Valencia	2010–11	La Liga	16	0	2	0	4	0	–		22	0
Valencia	2011–12	La Liga	21	0	7	0	6	0	–		34	0
Valencia	2012–13	La Liga	18	0	4	0	5	0	–		27	0
Valencia	Total		346	6	27	0	100	2	7	1	480	9
Villarreal (loan)	1996–97	Segunda División	34	0	5	0	–		–		39	0
Villarreal (loan)	1998–99	La Liga	35	2	4	0	–		2 (Note: Appearances in La Liga promotion/relegation play-offs)	0	41	2
Career total			446	12	36	0	100	2	14	2	596	16

=== International ===
Appearances and goals by national team and year
National team	Year	Apps	Goals
Spain	2001	1	0
Spain	2002	5	0
Spain	2003	6	0
Spain	2004	11	0
Spain	2005	6	0
Spain	2006	11	0
Spain	2007	10	0
Spain	2008	1	0
Total		51	0

== Managerial statistics ==
As of 8 November 2026

Managerial record by team and tenure
Team	Nat	From	To	Record								Ref
Team	Nat	From	To	G	W	D	L	GF	GA	GD	Win %	Ref
Atzeneta	(Spain)	29 May 2019	24 May 2021	56	24	12	20	71	52	+19	42.86	
Villarreal C	(Spain)	20 December 2023	29 May 2025	55	21	19	15	91	62	+29	38.18	
Villarreal B	(Spain)	29 May 2025	Present	51	23	19	9	80	47	+33	45.10	
Total				162	68	50	44	242	161	+81	41.98	—

== Honours ==
Valencia

- La Liga: 2001–02, 2003–04
- Supercopa de España: 1999
- UEFA Cup: 2003–04
- UEFA Super Cup: 2004
- UEFA Champions League runner-up: 1999–2000, 2000–01

Spain U23

- Summer Olympics silver medal: 2000
