= Santiago Cañizares =

Spanish footballer

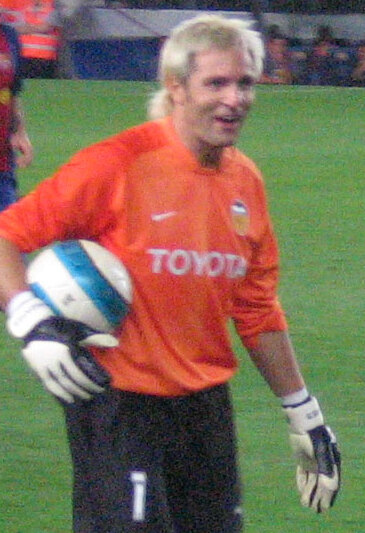
- Cañizares with Valencia in 2006

Personal information
- Full name: José Santiago Cañizares Ruiz
- Date of birth: 18 December 1969 (age 56)
- Place of birth: Madrid, Spain
- Height: 1.81 m (5 ft 11 in)
- Position: Goalkeeper

Youth career
- Calvo Sotelo
- 1985–1988: Real Madrid

Senior career*
Years	Team	Apps	(Gls)
1988–1989	Real Madrid C		
1989–1990	Real Madrid B	35	(0)
1988–1992	Real Madrid	0	(0)
1990–1991	→ Elche (loan)	7	(0)
1991–1992	→ Mérida (loan)	38	(0)
1992–1994	Celta	74	(0)
1994–1998	Real Madrid	41	(0)
1998–2008	Valencia	305	(0)
Total		500	(0)

International career
1985–1986	Spain U16	10	(0)
1987	Spain U17	1	(0)
1986–1988	Spain U18	8	(0)
1988–1989	Spain U19	5	(0)
1989–1990	Spain U20	6	(0)
1990–1991	Spain U21	3	(0)
1991–1992	Spain U23	6	(0)
1993–2006	Spain	46	(0)
Medal record
Representing Spain
Olympic Games
Gold medal – first place	1992
UEFA European Under-16 Championship
Winner	1986
- * Club domestic league appearances and goals

José Santiago Cañizares Ruiz (Spanish pronunciation: [xoˈse sanˈtjaɣo kaɲiˈθaɾes ˈrwiθ]; born 18 December 1969) is a Spanish former professional footballer who played as a goalkeeper.

A product of Real Madrid's youth academies, he eventually joined the first team but proved unable to establish himself there, being loaned out twice. He moved to Valencia in 1998, appearing in 416 official matches over the next decade and winning several major titles, including two La Liga championships and the 2004 UEFA Cup.

Cañizares represented Spain in three World Cups and as many European Championships, and won a gold medal at the 1992 Summer Olympics.

== Club career ==
Born in Madrid but raised in Puertollano, Castilla–La Mancha from where his parents hailed, Cañizares started his career with Real Madrid in 1988, playing initially with its C team. He started professionally with Elche, Mérida and Celta de Vigo, making his first La Liga appearance with the Galicians in the 1992–93 season, missing only two league games during his tenure and subsequently returning to Real Madrid.

Unable to cement a starting place, his best output being 26 matches during 1997–98 (but he lost his place in the final part of the year to Bodo Illgner, thus missing the 1998 Champions League final), Cañizares moved to Valencia in 1998 to replace the retired Andoni Zubizarreta. He helped the club to win the Copa del Rey and Supercopa de España in 1999, also reaching consecutive UEFA Champions League finals (2000 and 2001, saving a penalty from Bayern Munich's Mehmet Scholl in normal time of an eventual penalty shootout defeat in the latter edition) and winning national championships in 2002 and 2004, adding the 2004 UEFA and Super Cups; following the latter campaign, the 34-year-old renewed his contract with the Che for a further two years.

In December 2007, Cañizares, alongside teammates Miguel Ángel Angulo and David Albelda, was axed by manager Ronald Koeman, with all three players limited to training and unable to join another side in Spain, having already played four league games. In late April 2008, however, with Koeman's sacking, all three were reinstated by new coach Voro in a squad seriously threatened with relegation, with five rounds remaining; he returned to action on 27 April 2008 as Timo Hildebrand and Juan Luis Mora were injured, in a 3–0 home win against Osasuna.

On 16 May 2008, Cañizares agreed to end his contract with Valencia and leave the club. He played his final game two days later against Atlético Madrid, retiring shortly after at almost 39 years of age and having appeared in exactly 500 league matches – both major levels combined – during exactly two decades.

== International career ==
Cañizares earned 46 caps for Spain, debuting on 17 November 1993 in a 1994 FIFA World Cup qualifier against Denmark. As Zubizarreta was sent off in the tenth minute, he kept a clean sheet; the match ended in a 1–0 victory for the Spaniards.

However, Cañizares was often second choice, and only played five games in the major international scene, one in the 1994 World Cup against South Korea (as Zubizarreta served a one-match ban), three in UEFA Euro 2000 and one in the 2006 World Cup. He was also a squad member at the Euro 1996, 1998 World Cup, and Euro 2004; however, he did not take part in any of them, being behind by Zubizarreta in the 1990s and Iker Casillas in 2004. He was equally unused by the gold-winning team at the 1992 Summer Olympics in Barcelona, where Toni Jiménez appeared in all the matches.

Cañizares' club form ensured himself starter status in the 2002 World Cup, but he missed out on the tournament due to an accident with an aftershave bottle, which resulted in a severed tendon in his foot. He was also in Spain's squad at the following edition, making his only appearance in Germany and last in his international career in the last group match, a 1–0 victory over Saudi Arabia in Kaiserslautern.

== Style of play ==
Cañizares was considered to be one of the best goalkeepers of his generation, with Peter Schmeichel lauding him as the best goalkeeper in the world in 2004. Although he was a good shot-stopper who possessed good reflexes and penalty-stopping abilities, he was not known to be a spectacular goalkeeper, although he was capable of producing difficult saves when necessary. He was mainly known for his consistency, composure, outstanding positional, sense and reading of the game, as well as ability to organise the back-line, and was a vocal presence in goal.

== Motor racing career ==
In October 2010, Cañizares competed for the first time in a scoring event for the Spanish Rally Championship, driving a Suzuki Swift with co-driver Dani Cué in the Sierra Morena Rally. The following year, with the same car and the same partner, he was part of the Suzuki Ibérica Motor Sport team.

During a session in the 2016 Sierra Morena Rally, Cañizares crashed his vehicle after attempting to break coming into a bend. He eventually emerged unharmed from the accident.

On 17 June 2017, Cañizares earned his first victory by winning the Rally de la Cerámica with a Porsche 997. Later that year, he was crowned Valencian Community champion.

== Post-retirement and personal life ==
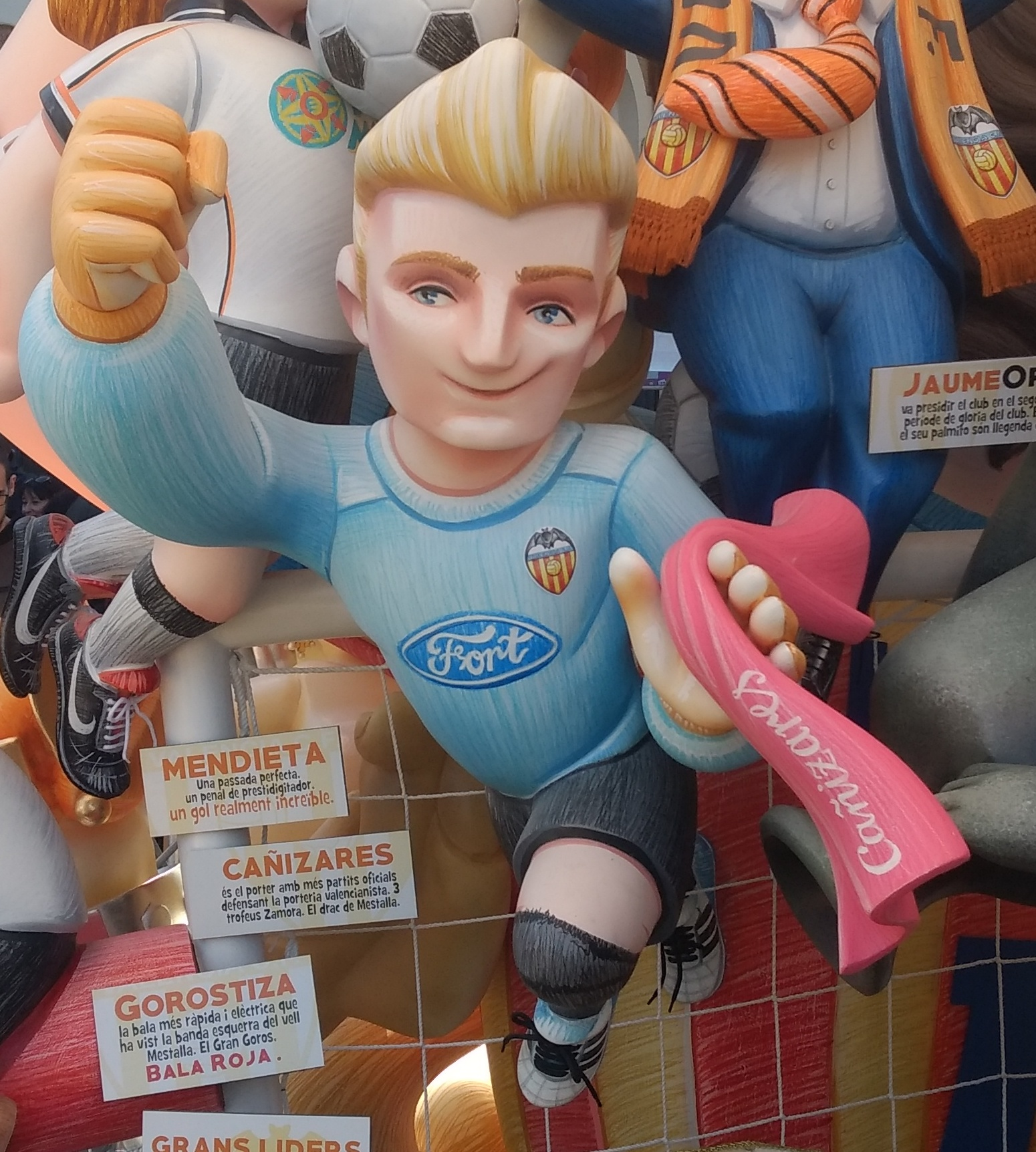
A representation of Cañizares at the 2019 Falles

After retiring, Cañizares worked as a commentator. He fathered seven children from his two marriages, including triplets with his second wife Mayte García.

On 23 March 2018, Cañizares announced the death of his five-year-old son Santi due to cancer. In 2019, he was subjected to controversy after making disapproving comments on the circumstances of José Antonio Reyes' death; following immediate social media backlash, he issued a more compassionate statement of clarification.

On 16 October 2020, it was reported that Cañizares' son Lucas would be included in the squad list of Real Madrid for a league match against Cádiz.

== Career statistics ==
=== Club ===
Appearances and goals by club, season and competition
Club	Season	League			Copa del Rey		Europe		Other (Note: Appearances in Supercopa de España)		Total	
Club	Season	Division	Apps	Goals	Apps	Goals	Apps	Goals	Apps	Goals	Apps	Goals
Real Madrid	1988–89	La Liga	0	0	0	0	0	0	—		0	0
Castilla	1989–90	Segunda División	35	0	2	0	—		—		37	0
Elche (loan)	1990–91	Segunda División	7	0	2	0	—		—		9	0
Mérida (loan)	1991–92	Segunda División	38	0	0	0	—		—		38	0
Celta	1992–93	La Liga	36	0	1	0	—		—		37	0
Celta	1993–94	La Liga	38	0	7	0	—		—		45	0
Celta	Total		74	0	8	0	—		—		82	0
Real Madrid	1994–95	La Liga	1	0	0	0	2	0	—		3	0
Real Madrid	1995–96	La Liga	12	0	1	0	1	0	2	0	16	0
Real Madrid	1996–97	La Liga	2	0	0	0	—		—		2	0
Real Madrid	1997–98	La Liga	26	0	0	0	6	0	2	0	34	0
Real Madrid	Total		41	0	1	0	9	0	4	0	55	0
Valencia	1998–99	La Liga	38	0	6	0	10	0	—		54	0
Valencia	1999–2000	La Liga	23	0	2	0	13	0	2	0	40	0
Valencia	2000–01	La Liga	37	0	0	0	18	0	—		55	0
Valencia	2001–02	La Liga	32	0	1	0	7	0	—		40	0
Valencia	2002–03	La Liga	31	0	0	0	12	0	2	0	45	0
Valencia	2003–04	La Liga	37	0	0	0	7	0	—		44	0
Valencia	2004–05	La Liga	29	0	0	0	7	0	2	0	38	0
Valencia	2005–06	La Liga	36	0	0	0	5	0	—		41	0
Valencia	2006–07	La Liga	32	0	1	0	11	0	—		44	0
Valencia	2007–08	La Liga	10	0	0	0	5	0	—		15	0
Valencia	Total		305	0	10	0	95	0	6	0	416	0
Career total			500	0	23	0	104	0	10	0	637	0

=== International ===
Appearances and goals by national team and year
National team	Year	Apps	Goals
Spain	1993	1	0
Spain	1994	5	0
Spain	1995	2	0
Spain	1996	1	0
Spain	1997	0	0
Spain	1998	5	0
Spain	1999	7	0
Spain	2000	5	0
Spain	2001	6	0
Spain	2002	4	0
Spain	2003	3	0
Spain	2004	5	0
Spain	2005	0	0
Spain	2006	2	0
Total		46	0

== Racing record ==
=== Career summary ===
Season	Series	Team	Races	Wins	Poles	F/Laps	Podiums	Points	Position
2015	NASCAR Whelen Euro Series	Dasi Racing Team	1	0	0	0	0	27	36th

=== Complete NASCAR Whelen Euro Series – Elite 2 ===
NASCAR Whelen Euro Series – Elite 2 results
Year	Team	No.	Make	1	2	3	4	5	6	7	8	9	10	11	12	NWESC	Pts
2015	Dasi Racing Team	4	Mustang	VAL; 17	VAL	VEN	VEN	BRH	BRH	TOU	TOU	UMB	UMB	ZOL	ZOL	36th	27

^{*} Season still in progress
^{1} Ineligible for series points

== Honours ==
Real Madrid

- La Liga: 1994–95, 1996–97
- Supercopa de España: 1997
- UEFA Champions League: 1997–98

Valencia

- La Liga: 2001–02, 2003–04
- Copa del Rey: 1998–99
- Supercopa de España: 1999; runner-up 2002, 2004
- UEFA Cup: 2003–04
- UEFA Super Cup: 2004
- UEFA Intertoto Cup: 1998
- UEFA Champions League runner-up: 1999–2000, 2000–01

Spain U16

- UEFA European Under-16 Championship: 1986

Spain U23

- Summer Olympic Games: 1992

Individual

- Ricardo Zamora Trophy: 1992–93 (shared), 2000–01, 2001–02, 2003–04
- UEFA Team of the Year: 2001

== See also ==
- List of La Liga players (400+ appearances)
- List of Valencia CF players (+100 appearances)
