= 2001–02 La Liga =

71st season of La Liga

La Liga
- Season: 2001–02
- Dates: 25 August 2001 – 11 May 2002
- Champions: Valencia; 5th title
- Relegated: Las Palmas; Tenerife; Zaragoza
- Champions League: Real Madrid (as Champions League winners); Valencia; Deportivo La Coruña; Barcelona
- UEFA Cup: Celta Vigo; Real Betis; Alavés
- Intertoto Cup: Málaga; Villarreal
- Matches: 380
- Goals: 961 (2.53 per match)
- Top goalscorer: Diego Tristán (21 goals)
- Biggest home win: Real Madrid 7–0 Las Palmas (10 February 2002)
- Biggest away win: Tenerife 0–6 Barcelona (2 February 2002)
- Highest scoring: Real Madrid 7–0 Las Palmas (10 February 2002); Athletic Bilbao 1–6 Celta Vigo (24 March 2002); Villarreal 5–2 Athletic Bilbao (31 March 2002)

The 2001–02 La Liga season was the 71st since its establishment. It began on 25 August 2001, and concluded on 11 May 2002.

== Teams ==
Twenty teams competed in the league – the top seventeen teams from the previous season and the three teams promoted from the Segunda División. The promoted teams were Sevilla, Betis and Tenerife. Both Sevilla and Betis returned to the top flight after a year absence while Tenerife returned to the top fight after a two-year absence. They replaced Oviedo, Racing Santander and Numancia, ending their top flight spells of thirteen, eight and two-year respectively.

▲ Promoted to 2001–02 La Liga	▼ Relegated from 2000–01 La Liga
Sevilla; Real Betis; Tenerife	Oviedo; Racing Santander; Numancia

== Team information ==
=== Clubs and locations ===
Location of teams in La Liga 2001–02

2001–02 season was composed of the following clubs:

Team	Stadium	Capacity
Barcelona	Camp Nou	98,772
Real Madrid	Santiago Bernabéu	80,354
Espanyol	Estadi Olímpic Lluís Companys	55,926
Valencia	Mestalla	55,000
Real Betis*	Manuel Ruiz de Lopera	52,132
Sevilla*	Ramón Sánchez Pizjuán	45,500
Athletic Bilbao	San Mamés	39,750
Deportivo de La Coruña	Riazor	34,600
Real Zaragoza	La Romareda	34,596
Celta de Vigo	Estadio Balaídos	32,500
Real Sociedad	Anoeta	32,200
Málaga	La Rosaleda	30,044
Valladolid	José Zorrilla	27,846
Mallorca	Son Moix	23,142
Villarreal	El Madrigal	23,000
Tenerife*	Heliodoro Rodríguez López	22,824
Las Palmas	Insular	21,000
Alavés	Mendizorrotza	19,840
Osasuna	El Sadar	19,553
Rayo Vallecano	Campo de Fútbol de Vallecas	14,505

(*) Promoted from Segunda División

== League table ==
Pos	Team	Pld	W	D	L	GF	GA	GD	Pts	Qualification or relegation
1	Valencia (C)	38	21	12	5	51	27	+24	75	Qualification for the Champions League group stage
2	Deportivo La Coruña	38	20	8	10	65	41	+24	68	Qualification for the Champions League group stage
3	Real Madrid (Note: Real Madrid qualified directly for the 2002–03 UEFA Champions League as holders.)	38	19	9	10	69	44	+25	66	Qualification for the Champions League group stage
4	Barcelona	38	18	10	10	65	37	+28	64	Qualification for the Champions League third qualifying round
5	Celta Vigo	38	16	12	10	64	46	+18	60	Qualification for the UEFA Cup first round
6	Real Betis	38	15	14	9	42	34	+8	59	Qualification for the UEFA Cup first round
7	Alavés (Note: Since Deportivo and Real Madrid, finalists of 2001–02 Copa del Rey, were qualified for the 2002–03 UEFA Champions League, Alavés entered UEFA Cup as best qualified in no european places (7th placed))	38	17	3	18	41	44	−3	54	Qualification for the UEFA Cup first round
8	Sevilla	38	14	11	13	51	40	+11	53 (Note: SEV: 7 pts → SEV 3–3 ATH; ATH: 7 pts → ATH 0–1 SEV; MLG: 3 pts)	
9	Athletic Bilbao	38	14	11	13	54	66	−12	53	
10	Málaga	38	13	14	11	44	44	0	53	Qualification for the Intertoto Cup third round
11	Rayo Vallecano	38	13	10	15	46	52	−6	49	
12	Valladolid	38	13	9	16	45	58	−13	48	
13	Real Sociedad	38	13	8	17	48	54	−6	47 (Note: ESP 1–2 RSO; RSO 1–0 ESP)	
14	Espanyol	38	13	8	17	47	56	−9	47	
15	Villarreal	38	11	10	17	46	55	−9	43 (Note: MLL 0–1 VIL; VIL 2–1 MLL)	Qualification for the Intertoto Cup second round
16	Mallorca	38	11	10	17	40	52	−12	43	
17	Osasuna	38	10	12	16	36	49	−13	42	
18	Las Palmas (R)	38	9	13	16	40	50	−10	40	Relegation to the Segunda División
19	Tenerife (R)	38	10	8	20	32	58	−26	38	Relegation to the Segunda División
20	Zaragoza (R)	38	9	10	19	35	54	−19	37	Relegation to the Segunda División

Source: LFP
Rules for classification: 1st points; 2nd head-to-head points; 3rd head-to-head goal difference; 4th head-to-head goals scored; 5th goal difference; 6th number of goals scored; 7th Fair-play points
(C) Champions; (R) Relegated

== Results ==
Home \ Away	ATH	FCB	BET	CEL	ALV	RCD	ESP	MCF	MLL	OSA	RVA	RMA	RSO	SFC	TEN	LPA	VCF	VLD	VIL	ZAR
Athletic Bilbao		0–2	0–0	1–6	2–1	1–1	1–1	3–2	0–1	1–1	1–1	2–1	2–1	0–1	1–2	3–1	2–2	1–4	0–0	2–1
Barcelona	1–2		3–0	2–2	3–2	3–2	2–0	5–1	3–0	0–1	1–1	1–1	2–0	3–1	2–0	1–1	2–2	4–0	4–1	2–0
Betis	1–1	2–1		4–1	1–0	0–3	2–0	1–1	1–0	0–0	2–0	3–1	3–0	0–0	1–0	1–0	1–3	2–0	1–1	0–1
Celta de Vigo	2–3	2–1	3–1		3–1	0–2	4–1	0–0	2–0	1–1	2–2	0–1	3–1	1–2	3–0	3–2	1–1	1–1	3–1	2–0
Alavés	2–3	2–0	0–1	1–0		2–3	2–1	1–0	0–4	0–2	0–1	0–0	2–0	0–1	1–0	1–0	1–2	3–1	2–1	2–1
Deportivo La Coruña	1–2	2–1	2–0	2–2	0–1		3–1	2–2	5–0	5–1	1–1	3–0	3–1	1–0	3–1	1–0	1–0	4–0	0–0	1–0
Espanyol	2–0	2–0	1–1	2–0	1–2	1–0		1–2	2–1	1–1	3–1	2–1	1–2	2–3	2–0	3–1	2–3	1–0	3–1	2–1
Málaga	1–2	1–1	3–2	2–2	1–0	1–1	2–0		0–0	2–1	0–0	1–1	1–0	1–3	2–0	1–1	0–2	1–2	2–1	2–1
Mallorca	3–0	0–0	1–3	0–1	0–0	4–1	2–1	1–1		4–2	3–0	1–1	0–2	0–4	2–0	0–3	1–1	2–1	0–1	0–1
Osasuna	0–1	0–0	1–2	0–3	0–1	1–3	1–1	0–2	4–0		1–0	3–1	1–1	1–0	0–2	3–2	0–0	1–0	2–2	0–0
Rayo Vallecano	4–2	2–1	0–0	1–0	2–0	2–1	2–2	3–0	0–2	0–1		0–3	2–1	2–1	2–0	0–0	2–1	1–0	1–2	1–2
Real Madrid	2–0	2–0	1–1	1–1	3–1	3–1	5–1	1–1	0–0	2–1	3–1		3–1	2–1	4–1	7–0	1–0	2–2	3–0	3–1
Real Sociedad	1–3	0–2	0–0	0–0	1–2	1–1	1–0	2–1	1–2	2–1	2–2	3–0		3–3	0–2	1–1	2–0	6–0	2–1	3–1
Sevilla	3–3	1–2	0–0	0–1	2–0	0–1	3–0	0–2	2–2	0–0	2–1	0–1	0–1		2–0	1–1	1–1	4–0	1–0	4–2
Tenerife	2–3	0–6	2–1	1–1	0–2	3–1	1–1	1–0	0–0	3–1	3–1	0–2	0–1	1–1		1–3	0–1	1–5	2–0	0–0
Las Palmas	1–1	0–0	0–0	4–2	2–1	0–1	2–0	0–0	3–1	1–1	0–2	4–2	0–0	1–0	0–1		0–1	1–1	3–2	1–1
Valencia	2–1	2–0	2–0	0–0	0–0	1–0	2–1	2–1	1–1	2–1	2–1	1–0	4–0	2–0	0–0	1–0		1–2	1–0	2–0
Valladolid	2–0	1–2	0–2	2–4	1–3	3–0	0–1	0–0	2–1	1–0	3–1	2–1	1–3	1–1	0–0	1–0	1–1		1–0	2–0
Villarreal	5–2	0–1	1–1	2–1	1–0	1–1	1–1	1–2	2–1	3–0	1–1	2–3	1–0	0–2	2–1	2–0	1–1	2–2		2–1
Zaragoza	2–2	1–1	1–1	0–1	0–2	1–2	0–0	0–2	1–0	0–1	3–2	2–1	3–2	1–1	1–1	2–1	0–1	0–0	3–2	

Source: LFP (in Spanish)
Legend: Blue = home team win; Yellow = draw; Red = away team win.

== Overall ==
- Most wins - Valencia (21)
- Fewest wins - UD Las Palmas and Real Zaragoza (9)
- Most draws - Málaga CF and Real Betis (14)
- Fewest draws - Deportivo Alavés (3)
- Most losses - Tenerife (20)
- Fewest losses - Valencia (5)
- Most goals scored - Real Madrid (69)
- Fewest goals scored - Tenerife (32)
- Most goals conceded - Athletic Bilbao (66)
- Fewest goals conceded - Valencia (27)

== Awards ==
=== Pichichi Trophy ===
The Pichichi Trophy is awarded to the player who scores the most goals in a season.

Rank	Player	Club	Goals
1	(Spain) Diego Tristán	Deportivo La Coruña	21
2	(Netherlands) Patrick Kluivert	Barcelona	18
2	(Spain) Fernando Morientes	Real Madrid	18
4	(Spain) Catanha	Celta Vigo	17
4	(Argentina) Javier Saviola	Barcelona	17
4	(Spain) Raúl Tamudo	Espanyol	17

=== Fair Play award ===
Rank	Club	Points
1	Deportivo La Coruña	88
2	Real Sociedad	97
3	Real Madrid	99
4	Barcelona	100
5	Valladolid	104
6	Mallorca	107
7	Valencia	121
8	Athletic Bilbao	125
8	Zaragoza	125
10	Espanyol	131
11	Rayo Vallecano	148
12	Celta Vigo	153
13	Tenerife	155
14	Alavés	159
15	Betis	162
15	Villarreal	162
17	Las Palmas	171
18	Málaga	173
19	Sevilla	175
20	Osasuna	180

- Source: Mundo Deportivo (newspaper archive, web) and CanalDeportivo

=== Pedro Zaballa award ===
Manuel Pablo (Deportivo de La Coruña) and Everton Giovanella (Celta Vigo) footballers

== See also ==
- 2001–02 Segunda División
- 2001–02 Copa del Rey

== Attendances ==
#	Club	Avg. attendance	% change	Highest
1	Real Madrid	63,645	-1.3%	71,529
2	FC Barcelona	54,211	-13.4%	95,000
3	Valencia CF	45,211	5.8%	54,000
4	Real Betis	36,842	25.4%	50,000
5	Athletic Club	33,211	3.4%	39,000
6	Sevilla FC	33,158	10.5%	45,000
7	Deportivo de La Coruña	29,368	1.5%	34,000
8	Real Zaragoza	25,013	-0.2%	34,000
9	Real Sociedad	24,885	-0.5%	30,000
10	Celta de Vigo	21,553	-0.6%	31,500
11	RCD Espanyol	19,984	8.0%	47,900
12	CA Osasuna	16,861	-2.3%	18,870
13	RCD Mallorca	16,726	0.5%	22,000
14	CD Tenerife	16,684	32.0%	24,000
15	UD Las Palmas	16,456	-4.5%	22,000
16	Villarreal CF	16,137	5.0%	22,700
17	Málaga CF	16,000	1.3%	30,000
18	Deportivo Alavés	13,740	-1.7%	16,124
19	Real Valladolid	13,116	-1.0%	18,000
20	Rayo Vallecano	11,061	21.8%	16,000
